= Armed struggle against the Brazilian military dictatorship =

Armed actions in Brazil

Armed struggle in Brazil
Date	1964–1985
Location	Brazil
Result	Government victory

Belligerents
Brazil; Brazilian Armed Forces; Army; Air Force; Navy	Communist guerrillas: Communist Party of Brazil (PCdoB); 8th October Revolutionary Movement ) (MR8); National Liberation Action (ALN); Palmares Revolutionary Armed Vanguard (VAR-Palmares); National Liberation Command (COLINA); Tiradentes Revolutionary Movement (MRT); Revolutionary Nationalist Movement (MNR)

Commanders and leaders
Pascoal Ranieri Mazzilli; Castelo Branco; Artur da Costa e Silva; Emílio Garrastazu Médici; Ernesto Geisel; João Figueiredo	João Amazonas; Maurício Grabois (executed); Vladimir Palmeira; Daniel Aarão Reis; Carlos Lamarca †; Carlos Marighella †; Boanerges Massa (MIA); Leonel Brizola

Different left-wing groups promoted an armed struggle against the Brazilian military dictatorship between 1968 and 1972, the most severe phase of the regime. Despite its resistance aspect, the majority of the groups that participated in the armed struggle aimed to achieve a socialist revolution in Brazil, inspired by the Chinese and Cuban Revolution. Although some actions were held between 1965 and 1967, the confrontations deepened after the enactment of Institutional Act Number Five (AI-5) in 1968. Many groups joined the armed struggle, including the National Liberation Action, the National Liberation Command, the 8th October Revolutionary Movement, the Communist Party of Brazil, the Popular Revolutionary Vanguard, and the Palmares Armed Revolutionary Vanguard.

The revolutionary organizations aimed to start rural guerrilla warfare, but were also notable for their urban actions. Considered acts of armed propaganda for the revolution, the operations helped raise funds to unleash guerrilla warfare in the countryside and sustain the clandestine infrastructure of the organizations. The urban guerrillas, classified as terrorism by the dictatorial government and the Brazilian press, initially surprised the state's repressive apparatus, which quickly perfected and professionalized its combat against the rebels. The military high command established a police and bureaucratic apparatus based on espionage, intelligence gathering and special operations aimed at capturing and interrogating political opponents of the regime through the systematic use of torture.

Despite their initial success, the revolutionary organizations faced social isolation, which worsened after the repression and disinformation campaign perpetrated by some sectors of the dictatorship. Paramilitaries linked to federal government authorities carried out false flag operations against civilians and the military with the aim of eroding popular support for the rebels and justifying the deepening of authoritarianism. The armed actions in the cities were short-lived. Among all the organizations involved in the armed struggle, only the Communist Party of Brazil managed to effectively promote rural guerrilla warfare. The dismantling of the Araguaia guerrillas in 1974 marked the total collapse of the armed struggle in Brazil at the cost of hundreds of deaths, exiles and disappearances during the dictatorship.

== Background ==
=== PCB hegemony ===
Until 1964, the Brazilian Communist Party (PCB) was the hegemonic force on the political left in Brazil. Although it was illegal, it experienced its peak during the democratic period from 1945 to 1964. At the time, the party had many members and its ideas influenced the political and trade union struggle and part of the intellectual elite. The PCB's program was reformist, as it intended to achieve a bourgeois revolution in Brazil. The communists considered that Brazilian society still had feudal characteristics in the countryside, which prevented the development of capitalist productive forces.

According to the PCB's assessment, the feudal sectors had the support of foreign imperialists, who had no interest in the autonomous development of the Brazilian economy. The communists proposed an alliance with the national bourgeoisie and other progressive sectors of society in order to implement a bourgeois-democratic revolution. Their program had many similar points to the proposals defended by the Brazilian Labour Party (PTB), headed by then-president João Goulart. At the time, both groups were committed to fighting for the implementation of the base reforms.

=== Impact of the Cuban and Chinese revolutions ===
The victory of the Cuban Revolution and the proclamation of its socialist identity challenged the ideas of the PCB. Fidel Castro's guerrilla movement attracted the support of a wide range of left-wing, nationalist and anti-imperialist groups and emerged as an alternative for those who opposed the directives of the Soviet Union. Inspired by the revolutionary successes in Cuba, two organizations emerged in opposition to the PCB: Popular Action (AP) and Revolutionary Marxist Organization Workers' Politics (POLOP). AP, created in 1962 as an autonomous organization influenced by the student movement, reached the directorate of the National Union of Students (UNE) and other student organizations during the 1960s.

Based on the Catholic University Youth (JUC), the AP defended the creation of a political alternative to capitalism and Soviet communism inspired by Christian humanism and with Castroist influences. POLOP, created in 1961, included elements from several small tendencies that opposed the PCB and were influential in university circles. It challenged the reformism of the PCB and defended the revolutionary armed struggle for socialism. Francisco Julião, leader of the Peasant Leagues, was also influenced by the Cuban Revolution. In 1961, he founded the Tiradentes Revolutionary Movement, which was intended to be the basis of a rural guerrilla movement. The MRT sent militants to conduct guerrilla training on farms throughout Brazil, but a training camp located in Dianópolis, in the state of Goiás, was discovered by the police in November 1962 and the guerrilla project was dismantled before it was actually launched.

The Sino-Soviet rupture in 1963 allowed Maoism to be perceived as an alternative to the international communist movement. In 1962, the PCB split, resulting in the formation of the Communist Party of Brazil (PCdoB). The new party embraced Maoist China, criticized the reformism of the PCB and defended armed struggle. However, armed conflict was not an immediate or consistent political option for most Brazilian leftists before 1964. Foquismo and Maoism offered new perspectives for the Brazilian left, since Foquismo "adapted" the revolution to the Latin American reality and Maoism legitimized the revolution in a country with strong rural traditions.

=== Military coup of 1964 and fragmentation of leftist groups ===
After the 1964 military coup and the defeat of the progressive forces, the traditional left-wing parties and movements collapsed and experienced a process of self-criticism. For many leftist groups, the 1964 defeat confirmed the mistakes of the pacifist and reformist political line adopted by the PCB, which was blamed for the demobilization of the workers and progressive forces at the time of the coup. The PCB leadership did not manage to accept defeat and was unable to conduct a self-criticism of its actions before 1964.

Between 1965 and 1968, the university bases broke with the PCB and formed local dissidents (DIs). In the state of Rio de Janeiro, the DI-RJ emerged; in Guanabara, the Communist Dissidence of Guanabara (both later called 8 October Revolutionary Movement); in Rio Grande do Sul, the DI-RS; in São Paulo, the University Dissidence of São Paulo; and in Minas Gerais, the Revolutionary Movement. There were divisions led by Carlos Marighella, who created the National Liberation Action (ALN), and by leader Mário Alves, who formed the Brazilian Revolutionary Communist Party (PCBR). The two organizations took PCB militants with them across Brazil, although the ALN concentrated its strength in São Paulo and the PCBR in Guanabara. It is estimated that by 1968, the PCB had lost at least half of its remaining members, who fled to organizations that proposed immediate armed resistance.

The alleged delay in preparing armed resistance to the military regime caused divisions within PCdoB. Between 1966 and 1967, it lost more than half of its members, who formed the Revolutionary Communist Party (PCR) in Northeastern Brazil and the Red Wing of the PCdoB (PCdoB-AV or ALA) in the Center-Southeast, which also divided and formed the Tiradentes Revolutionary Movement (MRT) in São Paulo and the Marxist Revolutionary Movement (MRM) in Minas Gerais.

AP adopted Maoism, which displeased its members and sectors of the organization that opted for a political line closer to Foquismo. Between 1968 and 1969, they joined other revolutionaries to establish the Revolutionary Workers' Party (PRT). During the armed struggle, there were also militants who left the AP for other guerrilla groups. POLOP also faced splits, which would later give rise to the National Liberation Command (COLINA), in Minas Gerais, and the Communist Workers' Party (POC) in Rio Grande do Sul. In São Paulo, a POLOP dissidence merged with a part of the Nationalist Revolutionary Movement (MNR) to give rise, in 1968, to the Revolutionary Popular Vanguard (VPR).

== Theoretical principles of the revolutionary groups ==
=== Convergences ===
==== Criticism of the PCB ====
The left-wing organizations, although fragmented, shared common theoretical principles: all of them severely criticized the political line and practice adopted by the PCB. They considered that the PCB's analysis of the Brazilian reality was incorrect and resulted in a wrong position in the political struggle. Instead of adopting a peaceful and reformist political line, they argued that armed confrontation was necessary and denied the revolutionary role of the national bourgeoisie. The experimental period before 1964 should be discarded and the mistakes made by the PCB and the reformist political leadership should not be repeated.

==== Brazilian reality ====
The organizations of the armed left analyzed the Brazilian reality in a similar way. They believed that the Brazilian economy was going through an irreversible process of stagnation and that there would be no alternative to development as long as the country was subject to imperialism, which was secured by the repressive force of the military regime. The central task of the revolutionaries was to overthrow the dictatorship and expel the imperialists, who, together with sectors of the local ruling classes, were preventing the development of productive forces. Based on this perception, historian Daniel Aarão Reis described it as a "utopia of impasse": the Brazilian situation already had "pre-revolutionary" traits, the government had no historical conditions to offer political and economic alternatives to the country, and the popular masses, disillusioned with the reformist programs, tended to adopt more radical positions and moved towards armed confrontation with the revolutionaries.

==== Anti-theoretical stance ====
Another important aspect of the armed organizations was their anti-theoretical stance. The revolutionaries believed that the revolution would start with the action itself, and there was no time to waste on theoretical discussions. This attitude represented a reaction to the traditional long debates carried out by the PCB and other left-wing organizations before the coup. According to the revolutionaries, this practice would lead to bureaucratism and political immobilism, which was responsible for the defeat of the leftist groups in 1964.

==== Rural guerrilla warfare as a goal ====
Even though they operated in the cities, all the armed organizations discussed rural guerrilla warfare. Urban guerrilla warfare was considered a form of armed propaganda and fundraising to start guerrilla warfare in the countryside and maintain the clandestine functioning of the organizations. In the future, the urban guerrillas were expected to have the secondary function of disorganizing the repressive forces, keeping them busy in the cities and preventing them from moving to repress the guerrillas who had started in the countryside. According to the groups' opinion, most of Brazil's population came from rural areas and were subjected to the most backward forms of oppression and exploitation, which would give them a revolutionary feeling.

The peasant was seen as the weakest link in the imperialist chain, which is why the revolution had to be initiated through rural guerrilla warfare. In the course of the revolutionary process, the peasant would find his natural ally in the urban worker. However, this analysis denounced the lack of a better understanding of labor relations in the countryside and the economic transformations that Brazil was undergoing, especially regarding the advance of capitalism in rural areas: during the 1960s, the penetration of capitalist labor relations in the countryside led to the transformation of the majority of settlers, partners and residents into "boias-frias", instead of permanent employees on the farms. This type of work was more convenient for capital appreciation and compatible with other forms of sociability, such as settlement and partnership.

=== Divergences ===
The main differences involved the character of the Brazilian revolution, the type of organization and the forms of combat to be conducted by the revolutionaries.

==== Method of action ====
Regarding the characteristics of the Brazilian revolution, the main divergence was between those who defended the PCB's step-by-step thesis and those who defended the immediate socialist character of the revolution. Groups like the ALN and the MNR adopted an analytical scheme similar to that of the PCB, which stated that the first stage of the revolution would be bourgeois-democratic or national liberation, overcoming the obstacles imposed on national development by feudal relations in the countryside and the presence of imperialism in the economy. Unlike the PCB, which implicitly proposed that the revolutionary process be led by the national bourgeoisie, the armed organizations aimed to bring together as many social forces as possible in the revolutionary process of national liberation, but under the leadership of guerrilla groups more identified with the oppressed classes, especially workers and peasants.

Groups like the ANL, MNR, PCBR and Red Wing wanted to overthrow the military dictatorship, expel the imperialists and create a revolutionary popular government. Groups like the PRT, POC, VPR, MR-8 and VAR-Palmares, influenced by the theses of POLOP prior to the 1964 coup and the dependency theory, advocated the immediate socialist character of the revolution. According to them, there would be an integration between the national bourgeoisie, the imperialists and the landowners, with capitalism fully constituted in Brazil and with the bourgeoisie established as a ruling class.

==== Organization ====
Regarding organization, the positions differed on whether or not it was necessary to structure a party along classical Marxist–Leninist lines to carry out the revolution, starting with guerrilla warfare in the countryside and armed actions in the cities. The PCdoB, the Red Wing, the PRT and the POC were among those who advocated a vanguard party to lead the armed struggle, which would be responsible for coordinating the rural guerrillas, the urban armed struggle and the actions of the masses in the cities and countryside, directing the revolutionary process. The ALN, VPR, MNR and COLINA did not consider the party to be essential for the outbreak of the revolution, although they did admit the emergence of a vanguard party at a later stage, as occurred in the Cuban Revolution. Carlos Marighella's ANL was notable for its radical opposition to the classic party structure.

Despite these organizational differences, the armed groups generally structured themselves in sectors of urban mass work, rural guerrilla preparation and logistics. Each sector had its representative in the regional leadership, which was often confused with the national leadership. For security reasons, the sectors of the organization were not supposed to know each other, and contacts between the parts of each organization were made through pre-arranged meeting "points" in several locations. If a militant was absent from a pre-arranged meeting point, it meant that he had been arrested. Most groups had organized groups of sympathizers who often provided aid to the guerrillas and were seen as possible candidates for militancy.

==== Foquismo versus Maoism ====
The forms of combat to be undertaken in the revolutionary process also caused disagreements between the armed groups. The organizations were divided between Foquismo and Maoism, although some groups adopted hybrid positions between them. Foquismo was based on the assertion that the objective conditions in Latin America were ripe for revolutionary triumph on the continent, imposing itself on secondary national differences. The subjective conditions for the revolution could be created or quickly completed by the action of a guerrilla focus, which would begin with a small group acting among the peasants in regions whose natural conditions favored defense against army attacks. In the second stage, the guerrillas spread out from the initial region, taking the armed struggle to other regions and forming a rebel army capable of defeating the enemy. In the Foquismo, the military factor took precedence over the political factor, given the priority of the guerrilla focus over the party. It inspired armed groups with a more "militaristic" tendency, such as the ANL and the VPR, which stood out for the volume of armed actions carried out during the period in which they were active.

Both emphasized the peasantry and rural guerrilla warfare, but Maoism stated that the guerrilla army should be under the direction of a vanguard party. The Maoists of the AP and the PCdoB refrained from armed actions in the cities, while the Red Wing took intermediate positions, without ruling out mass struggles in the cities and urban guerrilla actions.

== Development of the armed struggle ==
=== First actions ===
Despite being advocated by a very small group within the Brazilian political left, guerrilla warfare didn't break out until 1964. The purpose of the armed struggle was not the restoration of the pre-coup system, but the realization of a socialist revolution in Brazil.

The left-wing nationalist groups, composed mainly of former low-ranking military officers who had been dismissed in 1964 and gathered under the leadership of Leonel Brizola, were the first to launch an armed struggle. They organized the Nationalist Revolutionary Movement (MNR) and sent some of its members to establish contacts with Brizola, who was coordinating the opposition from his exile in Uruguay. Although he agreed with the guerrilla plan, he insisted on the idea of an insurrection in Rio Grande do Sul, convincing the emissaries of the ex-servicemen, who began to conspire for the insurrection and established links with the military.

Organizations such as POLOP and AP also participated in the insurrectionary plan, directly or indirectly. In April 1966, the army discovered connections to the project within the barracks, arrested officers and put an end to the conspiratorial plot. Another uprising, supposedly linked to Brizola's plan, was the Três Passos Guerrilla movement. In March 1965, Colonel Jefferson Cardim, in command of 22 men, crossed Rio Grande do Sul and Santa Catarina to Paraná to find the rebels, which didn't happen. The group was dispersed on March 27, after an exchange of fire with an army troop.

Once the insurrectionary attempts had failed, the nationalists and their former subordinates started the guerrilla project. They intended to launch five combat fronts: one on the border between Minas Gerais and Espírito Santo, in the Caparaó mountain range, which would have two commands at different points, in Mato Grosso, Rio de Janeiro, on the border between Rio Grande do Sul and Santa Catarina and in the south of Maranhão. According to the plan, Brizola would enter Brazil through Rio Grande do Sul with the outbreak of five guerrilla fronts. Due to different problems, only the Caparaó mountain front was prepared, and with a single command instead of the two planned. Groups of MNR militants, almost exclusively ex-subalterns from the Armed Forces, arrived in the region at the end of 1966 and formed a unit of 14 members led by Amadeu Felipe da Luz Ferreira. Between March and April 1967, the Caparaó Guerrilla movement ended without a shot being fired, with its members arrested by a police patrol from Minas Gerais.

According to archives of the Superior Military Court revealed after re-democratization, during this period, an extreme right-wing group linked to members of the armed forces began to carry out false flag operations with the aim of manipulating public opinion and justifying the intensification of authoritarianism and repression by the dictatorial regime.

The most impactful act related to the Brazilian armed struggle took place on July 25, 1966: a bomb was placed at Guararapes airport in Recife, aimed at the then Minister of War and presidential candidate, Artur da Costa e Silva. The bomb killed two people and injured more than ten, but missed its target. The attack, attributed to the PCBR at the time, was allegedly the work of Alípio de Freitas, a member of the AP, who was in Recife in mid-1966 when Costa e Silva's visit was announced, but denied any involvement in the case even after the amnesty. Admiral Nelson Gomes Fernandes and journalist Edson Régis de Carvalho died in the attack. The outcome of the action, which became known as the Guararapes Airport Attack, was the immediate suspension by the AP leadership of any involvement by the organization in acts of urban guerrilla warfare. Converted to Maoism, the AP began to defend guerrilla warfare in the countryside and stopped conducting actions in the cities.

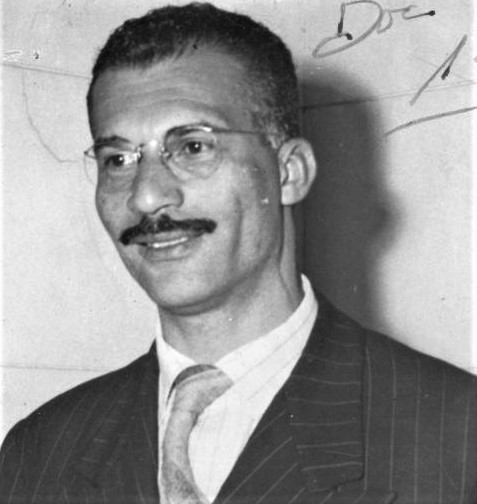
Marighella when he was a congressman, around 1946.

In December 1967, the first robbery by an armed group was carried out by the ALN, when they intercepted a car carrying money in the Santo Amaro neighborhood. In command of the action, Marighella collected the money from the robbery. Other thefts of bank branches and paying cars were committed, as well as the seizure of explosives used in construction. The heists were notable for their numbers and the robbers' modus operandi. Until 1967, bank robberies rarely exceeded two a year in São Paulo and the criminals robbed the tellers and the customers, while the guerrillas targeted the bank vaults.

Initially, the rebels didn't identify themselves in order to trick the police into thinking they were dealing with common criminals and the organizations could accumulate more firepower. On November 13, 1968, a paying car belonging to the Guanabara State Pension Institute (Instituto de Previdência do Estado do Rio de Janeiro - IPEG) was intercepted by three armed men, who took NCr$ 120,000. In the afternoon, a sergeant recognized the car in which the guerrillas had carried out the robbery at a gas station. Warned by the sergeant, the police arrested the driver, who underwent torture and provided information about the perpetrators, including the name of Marighella. From then on, newspapers and magazines published long articles about him. Before that, the ALN had already claimed a bomb attack in March 1968 on the US Consulate in São Paulo, revealing the existence of an armed struggle project to overthrow the regime.

By the end of 1968, other left-wing organizations had conducted armed actions. The Red Wing had organized three robberies, confiscated dynamite from a quarry and stole printing machines from the Kelmaq store in order to set up a clandestine workshop. On the night of July 1, 1968, COLINA murdered Edward Ernest Tito Otto Maximilian von Westernhagen, a major in the West German Army who had been mistaken for Gary Prado Salmón, one of Che Guevara's executioners. The most daring actions of the period were perpetrated by the VPR, including the theft of dynamite and FAL rifles from the guard at the Military Hospital in Cambuci on June 22; the attack on the 2nd Army Division's headquarters on June 26, which resulted in the death of Mário Kozel Filho; the murder of US Captain Charles Rodney Chandler, a Vietnam War veteran, on October 12; and the theft of a large stock of weapons from the Diana Store, in downtown São Paulo, on December 11.

=== Mass struggles, collapse of the regime and immersion in the armed struggle ===
When the military dictatorship was established in 1964, it attempted to purge political, trade union and military leaders who were committed to labour reformism, as well as cutting any organizational ties between these leaders and social movements. With the support of the urban middle classes and liberal civil sectors, anchored in the press and conservative parties, Castelo Branco's government acted to reorient the Brazilian economy and institutionalize the authoritarian regime. There was a consensus among the military leadership and the technocracy that the state and the economy needed to be modernized along capitalist lines in order to facilitate the entry of foreign capital. Castelo Branco's government also aimed to control inflation and restore Brazil's investment capacity. To achieve this, it applied a recessionary formula, controlling public spending and squeezing wages. Despite political support, the measures adopted by Castelo Branco's economic team did not have the desired effects. With the economy in crisis, part of the middle class and liberal sectors that had initially supported the coup soon became disillusioned with the new government.

After Institutional Act Number Two (AI-2), which consolidated the authoritarian and dictatorial nature of the regime, several political and social segments expanded the resistance movement. The main pre-coup political leaders (Carlos Lacerda, João Goulart and Juscelino Kubitschek) organized the Broad Front (Frente Ampla), the student movement reached the streets, attracted attention and earned sympathy from the liberal press and the Congress assembled several Parliamentary Inquiry Commission (CPIs), such as the one into the denationalization of land in the Amazon and the agreement between Time-Life and Rede Globo. Repression and recession made the government unpopular, especially in the big urban centers.

The student movement represented the most radicalized part of the opposition group. Since 1966, the students had held public protests against the dictatorship, clashing with the police and campaigning for a null vote. It assumed the task of criticizing the regime and taking the lead in the struggle for social change. In 1968, the death of high school student Edson Luís, shot by the police during a demonstration in Rio de Janeiro, sparked a series of protests across Brazil. More than 60,000 people attended his funeral and the seventh-day mass became a major conflict between students and the police. From the second half of 1968 onwards, influenced by the student uprisings in France in May 1968, the protests reached their peak in the March of the One Hundred Thousand (Passeata dos Cem Mil), on June 26, which was widely supported by society, artists and intellectuals.

During the demonstrations, the students managed to articulate the struggle for demands with the political fight, spreading slogans against the dictatorship based on specific student issues, such as the university reforms sought by the government. However, there were differences between the several branches of the student movement. While the AP and the PCdoB advocated strengthening the mass protests against the dictatorship, the groups represented by the university dissidents of the PCB were in favour of organizing an armed conflict. The clash between the various political orientations of the student movement marked the XXX UNE Congress, held clandestinely on a site in Ibiúna, in the interior of São Paulo, in October 1968. The event ended with the arrest of 920 students, including leaders such as Luís Travassos and José Dirceu. The repression, which had intensified in August with the military occupation of the University of Brasilia (UnB), led some students to see the armed struggle as an alternative to opposing the regime, as the large street demonstrations waned.

Also in 1968, the workers' movement returned to the political and social scene. Despite being harshly repressed and controlled from the beginning of the coup, the workers managed to regroup around new, younger and more radicalized leaders. The wage squeeze promoted by the regime began to be felt by the workers and, in April, 15,000 metalworkers went on strike for better salaries in Contagem, in the interior of Minas Gerais. In July, metalworkers in Osasco staged a radical strike and occupied the COBRASMA factory. The union was intervened and the army used repressive force to clear the factory. Both strikes were organized and led by groups of the revolutionary left, which branched out in the companies and dominated the metalworkers' unions. The actions of the left-wing organizations were centralized in the trade union apparatus, through which they prepared and led the strikes. Militants from AP, Corrente and COLINA played an important role in organizing the Contagem strike, while VPR militants were linked to the strike agitations in Osasco.

Besides the radicalization of students and workers, fed by the growing oppositionism of the middle class and the leftist preaching of artists and intellectuals, opposition politicians started pressuring the regime. In September, deputy Márcio Moreira Alves called the army a "torturers' cave" and recommended a boycott of the Independence Day military parades. The army claimed to be offended, and the government asked for Moreira Alves to leave to be prosecuted. On December 12, the Chamber of Deputies denied the request by 216 votes to 141. The decision was followed by the proclamation of Institutional Act Number Five (AI-5), which put the National Congress and the State Legislatures into recess, reopened restrictions on political rights and abolished habeas corpus for those who violated the National Security Law. Censorship became tougher and imposed total control over the press, opposition publications stopped circulating and artists were arrested and forced to leave the country.

Until the end of 1969, the armed left benefited from the clandestinity of members and sympathizers who had been active in the mass movements prior to AI-5. Since then, the pressure for armed struggle increased within the radical left organizations dedicated to working directly with social movements, in a process that Jacob Gorender called "general immersion in armed struggle". With the exception of the PCB, the Trotskyist Revolutionary Workers Party (Partido Operário Revolucionário Trotskista - PORT), the PCdoB, the AP and the short-lived Libertarian Student Movement (Movimento Estudantil Libertário - MEL), all of the left organizations of the period carried out urban armed action. Organizations that were involved in armed actions, such as ALN, COLINA and VPR, grew rapidly in number. COLINA and VPR, damaged by the repression resulting from their actions the previous year, recovered in the first half of 1969 through the merger that created VAR-Palmares. In July, they carried out the robbery of the safe of the former governor of São Paulo, Adhemar de Barros, in an action considered the most lucrative of the Brazilian armed struggle. The ALN grew in São Paulo, Guanabara and other states.

Non-armed organizations, such as the Communist Dissidence of Guanabara (DI-GB, later MR-8) and the PCBR, began organizing along these lines. The DI-GB created a special working group structured for urban guerrilla actions and began to carry out bank robberies and arms thefts. From the Pernambuco Regional Committee, the PCBR launched a number of actions in the Northeast, such as a robbery of the Banco da Lavoura in João Pessoa in May 1969, assaults on bank branches and gas stations in Recife and the destruction of a stage set up for the authorities at the Independence Day parade. The initiatives of the northeastern militants prompted activists in Rio de Janeiro and Guanabara, who quickly organized similar actions.

In 1969, two actions delayed and caused an attack on the island. The first was the invasion of the Rádio Nacional transmission station in Piraporinha on the morning of August 15 by twelve ALN guerrillas. They took control of the employees and broadcast a revolutionary manifesto read by Marighella. The Diário da Noite newspaper in São Paulo published the full text, which led to the arrest of the editor-in-chief, Hermínio Sacchetta, and the opening of an investigation.

On September 4, a joint command formed by ALN and DI-GB kidnapped the American ambassador Charles Burke Elbrick and demanded the release of fifteen political prisoners with safe transfer abroad, as well as the dissemination of a manifesto in newspapers and radio and television stations throughout Brazil. The military accepted the proposal, releasing political prisoners and providing flights to Mexico. The joint manifesto was disseminated by major newspapers and radio and television stations. After this action, DI-GB adopted the acronym 8 October Revolutionary Movement (MR-8), which had previously been used by University Dissidence of Niterói, dismantled by the repression in April.

The guerrilla actions aimed to raise funds to cover the clandestine structure of the organizations and to spread revolutionary propaganda to the masses. However, the long-term strategic plan was to launch rural guerrilla warfare, which was considered of fundamental importance in the fight against the dictatorship. In 1969, the ALN was preparing to transfer guerrillas from São Paulo to the southern region of Pará, which would be the convergence point for guerrillas simultaneously departing from rural areas in northern Paraná, Dourados, Chapada Diamantina, and Guapiaçu. Each guerrilla group would occupy villages and towns, burn registries, attack large estates, and distribute food to the poor population.

After splitting from VAR-Palmares, VPR established a guerrilla training camp in Ribeira Valley. In order to prepare future bases for the armed struggle in rural areas, the trained guerrillas were then sent to farms already purchased in Maranhão and Rio Grande do Sul. VAR also established a guerrilla training camp on a farm purchased in Pará, which was soon dismantled. The PCBR also acquired two sites in the interior of Paraná. They sent some militants to the region to organize local agricultural and peasant workers.

=== Repression and dismantling of the urban guerrillas ===
The urban armed actions, labeled as terrorism by the government and the mainstream media, caught the repressive apparatus of the state off guard. Until the end of the 1960s, state police forces, through the Departments of Political and Social Order (Departamentos de Ordem Política e Social - DOPS), were responsible for political repression operations. There was no national, militarized, and integrated system of police repression. The intelligence services of the Armed Forces were also highly fragmented, with functions divided among the Navy Information Center (Centro de Informações da Marinha - CENIMAR), Air Force Information Center (Centro de Informações da Aeronáutica - CISA), and Army Information Center (Centro de Informações do Exército - CIE).

The overlap of agencies and commands in the fight against urban guerrilla warfare, the lack of a nationally structured Federal Police and the inefficiency of DOPS hindered the fight against armed struggle. Fighting guerrillas required the existence of a centralized repressive apparatus. On June 29, 1969, Operation Bandeirantes (OBAN), a joint initiative of General José Canavarro Pereira, commander of the 2nd Army Division, and the São Paulo State Public Security Secretariat, was founded in São Paulo.

OBAN's staff was composed of officers and subordinates from the Armed Forces and the São Paulo Public Force, as well as delegates, investigators and bureaucrats linked to the Secretariat of Security. Its structure was financed by large Brazilian and multinational companies. Installed on the premises of the 36th Police District next to the Army Police Barracks in Rio de Janeiro, the site became one of the most famous torture centers in Brazil. Civil police chief Sérgio Paranhos Fleury occupied a prominent position in OBAN's structure, given the military's inexperience in proper police work, giving up systematic torture and extrajudicial executions during repressive activities.

Cautious of its commands and hierarchy, the military leadership included the police effort to combat guerrilla warfare and political repression. Inspired by OBAN's flexible model, the DOI-CODI system was created in September 1970. It was under the direct control of the commanders of each army or military region and could intercommunicate with the intelligence services of each force, which continued to exist and act. The Operations and Information Detachment (Departamento de Operações de Informações - DOI) was responsible for the practical actions of searching, seizing and interrogating suspects, while the functions of the Internal Defense Operations Center (Centro de Operações de Defesa Interna - CODI) covered the analysis of information, the coordination of the various military bodies and the strategic planning of the fight against left-wing groups. In all the capitals, the DOPS became annexes of the DOI-CODI, limited to the bureaucratic fulfillment required for the final formalization of the judicial processes to be submitted to the military audits (the only exception was the DOPS in São Paulo, which remained active as an autonomous body).

Torture was used systematically to dismantle revolutionary organizations. The military often used fabricated incidents and escapes to justify deaths under torture. From 1971 onwards, the repressive system developed a complex disappearance technique. The bodies of dead militants were incinerated, dismembered or buried as indigents or with changed names. A counter-information apparatus was organized to throw family members off the track. Several torture teams also maintained clandestine centers in order to circumvent the precarious control of the commanders and act without being accountable to the official repression system. In 1969, in direct response to the guerrilla groups, the regime proclaimed Institutional Acts 13 and 14, which instituted banishment and the death penalty, and reformulated the National Security Law, typifying new crimes and creating harsher penalties.

The repressive procedures involved a combination of military repression (interrogations based on torture and eventual summary executions) and legal procedures to impute guilt under the National Security Law. When a militant was arrested in police operations, he was not immediately placed under the tutelage of the judicial authority. Normally, the team that captured the militant was not the same team that interrogated him. These operations occurred without search or arrest warrants and during ambushes that resembled kidnappings. The heads of the interrogators were senior officers, while the heads of the captors were usually lower-ranking military officers. The interrogations were monitored, recorded and registered. If the prisoner survived, he was handed over to the police authorities for an investigation, which was followed by a trial by the military justice system.

As they engaged in armed struggle, left-wing organizations faced increasingly coordinated, equipped and informed repression, which brought a series of difficulties for their militants. Robberies of bank branches and paying cars brought in large sums of money, but quickly ran out to support the clandestine structure. Houses were rented to set up apparatuses to serve as homes for militants or as meeting places and weapons depots. The amount of money raised in robberies also decreased, as bank branches began to leave the bare minimum in their vaults and some actions yielded less than the cost of preparing and carrying them out. After a while, total commitment to the armed struggle alienated militants and sympathizers due to a lack of personal skills or ideological disposition. Especially from the end of 1969, the effects of the recovery of the national economy with the start of the Brazilian miracle became more clearly felt, which made it even more difficult to recruit militants willing to fight against a dictatorship that generated development and harshly repressed its opponents.

After the kidnapping of Charles Burke Elbrick, the repressive crisis caused severe casualties for the armed struggle. A series of arrests of militants led to the disappearance of important leaders of the revolutionary organizations. On November 4, 1969, Marighella was assassinated in an ambush and several contacts he had established were lost, as well as the resources for different actions that were supposed to be used in the preparation of rural guerrilla warfare. In early 1970, leaders of the MR-8, PCBR and VAR were also hit by repression. The Red Wing noticed that the money obtained from bank robberies did not compensate for the expenses and other problems they caused and proposed a retreat from the armed struggle and a rapprochement with the masses. The militants who were unhappy with the new approach formed the Tiradentes Revolutionary Movement (MRT) in São Paulo and the Marxist Revolutionary Movement (MRM) in Minas Gerais.

The groups that were not completely disbanded, reorganized. The PCBR established a new national leadership and launched actions in the Northeast. The MR-8 also reconstituted its national leadership and benefited from the incorporation of a group of high school students from Bahia led by Sérgio Landulfo Furtado and the entry of José Campos Barreto, or Zequinha, who was involved in the strike agitations in Osasco and had been active in the VPR and VAR. The VPR began guerrilla training in the Ribeira Valley under the leadership of Carlos Lamarca. After Marighella's death, the ALN was led by Joaquim Câmara Ferreira, who, seeking the unity of the revolutionary left, contacted other organizations to carry out armed actions together. Between the end of 1970 and the beginning of 1971, the ALN, MR-8, MRT and VPR carried out some joint actions, including kidnapping diplomats and successful robberies of paying cars and bank branches.

The last major actions carried out by the armed groups were the kidnappings of diplomats for the release of political prisoners. On March 12, the VPR, MRT and Democratic Resistance (Resistência Democrática - REDE) mobilized in an action to free Shizuo Ozawa, known as Mário Japa, a member of the VPR's Regional Coordination who knew the organization's guerrilla training camp and could reveal Lamarca's whereabouts. To free him, the group kidnapped Nobuo Okushi, the Japanese consul in São Paulo. The rescue list included only five names, including that of Mário Japa. The Médici government accepted the guerrillas' demands, releasing the political prisoners and sending them to Mexico. In April, the military discovered the location of the VPR's guerrilla training camp and Lamarca's whereabouts; on the 21st, the siege of the guerrillas in the Ribeira Valley began.

The rebels, successful in escaping the military's encirclement, winning battles and taking prisoners, reached the city of São Paulo on the night of the 31st. After his escape, Lamarca spent five months sheltering in an apparatus provided by Joaquim Alencar de Seixas, member of the MRT. On July 11, the ALN and VPR captured the German ambassador Ehrenfried von Holleben. During the action, security guard Irlando de Souza Régis was shot and lost his life. The Médici government quickly arranged for the publication of the revolutionaries' manifesto in the mainstream press and the release of forty political prisoners, who were sent to Algeria.

The last kidnapping was conducted by the VPR. On September 7, in an action commanded directly by Lamarca, the group kidnapped Swiss ambassador Giovanni Enrico Bucher and demanded the release of seventy political prisoners. On this occasion, the Médici government rejected several names from the original list, especially those arrested on charges or convicted of murder, sentenced to life imprisonment and who had taken part in the previous kidnappings. The unanticipated attitude forced the guerrillas to propose substitute names and some were also rejected. The negotiations lasted forty days and were conducted through secretive channels, while the police undertook a major investigation to locate Lamarca and the other guerrillas who were guarding Ambassador Bucher. In the end, an agreement was reached on the seventy political prisoners to be released, who were sent to Chile in exchange for Bucher's freedom.

After the kidnapping of Enrico Bucher, the armed organizations faced increasingly serious difficulties. In 1971, almost all the armed organizations were dismantled by the repression and their leaders arrested or killed. The ALN still managed to sustain the guerrilla war until 1973, going through splits that gave rise to the Popular Liberation Movement (Movimento de Libertação Popular - MOLIPO) and the Leninist Tendency (Tendência Leninista - TL). With the organizations shattered, militants imprisoned, killed, exiled or disappeared, and no prospect of recruiting new cadres, armed actions became a desperate means of survival for the militants and organizations still engaged in guerrilla warfare.

With the increasing social marginalization of the armed groups in the early 1970s, the militants were faced with a dilemma between abandoning their organizations and being branded "traitors" or remaining in the armed struggle and facing almost fatal imprisonment or death. In March 1974, when General Ernesto Geisel assumed the Presidency of the Republic, the urban guerrillas had already been extinguished at the cost of hundreds of prisoners, deaths, exiles and disappearances.

=== Araguaia Guerrilla and total dismantling of the armed struggle ===
An attempt to unleash rural guerrilla warfare was made before the armed struggle was completely dismantled. The PCdoB, which had chosen not to get involved in urban armed actions, was not affected by the repression and had better conditions to prepare and launch guerrilla warfare in the countryside. The Araguaia River region, in the south of Pará, was chosen by the party to start the armed struggle in the countryside; the PCdoB had militants living in the area since 1966. From 1967 onwards, new supporters arrived, usually party members who were wanted by the police because of their links to the student movement. By the beginning of 1972, over sixty PCdoB activists had settled in the region, including a large part of the party's Central Committee and Executive Commission.

The guerrillas were led by a military commission, which coordinated three detachments, each with its own commander and with around 21 members. Each section was subdivided into three groups of militants, including a chief and deputy chief for each group. The disciplinary and security rules were strict and the guerrillas only knew their comrades from their own detachment, ignoring the activities of the others. The preparation of the guerrillas was unknown to the population of Araguaia. The rebels settled as ordinary residents, who tried to be helpful and supportive of their neighbors. The low level of social conflict and the scant police presence facilitated the work of the militants, who integrated into the daily lives of the other rural workers without developing political activities. Occasionally, the militants carried out some assistance activities, such as medical and health care for the local residents.

The guerrilla war was about to begin when the presence of the PCdoB in that area was discovered by the repressive agencies, which forced them to accelerate their plans and launch the war immediately. The army spent almost two years and three military campaigns defeating the guerrillas. The first, from April to June 1972, involved thousands of men, mostly ordinary conscripts. The rebels inflicted some casualties on the military and caused panic among the troops, which won them a moral victory and forced the armed forces to retreat. A second campaign took place between September and October of the same year, but was also unsuccessful. Between April and October, the military inflicted only eighteen casualties among the guerrillas.

The military actions of the insurgents, who had few old weapons, were scarce and defensive. The guerrillas' political work only began at the end of 1972, after the defeat of the army's second campaign. They founded several sections of the Union for Freedom and People's Rights (União pela Liberdade e pelos Direitos do Povo - ULDP), which developed a moderate program proposing democratic social reforms to solve the problems faced by the local population. However, the guerrillas lacked sufficient time to deepen their political work, although they did achieve some popular participation in the ULDP and a few adherents to the movement.

After the defeat of the second campaign, the military tried to retreat tactically and devised a new strategy for the siege and definitive annihilation of the guerrillas, exchanging the large contingent of conscripts for a smaller and more effective number of experienced soldiers, armed and specially trained to fight the guerrillas, increasing the tactic of providing the population of the region with some assistance services in parallel with the repressive activity. Between the end of 1972 and the beginning of 1973, repression deeply affected the structure of the PCdoB in the cities, with several arrests and the deaths of four members of the Central Committee, three of them from the Executive Commission.

The guerrillas were isolated from their contacts in the city and became completely autonomous. In October 1973, the army launched the last military campaign to encircle and annihilate the guerrillas and won successive victories. By the end of the year, the army had destroyed the military commission, the organization that directed guerrilla activities in the middle of the forest. The survivors dispersed into the woods and formed five independent groups, who were hunted down and killed by the military. By mid-1974, all the guerrillas operating in Araguaia had been killed and disappeared. It was the definitive end of the armed struggle in Brazil.

The Araguaia guerrilla war was suppressed and hidden by the military and total censorship of the media prevented any news from being published about the events in the region. The only exceptions were the September 24, 1972 issue of the newspaper O Estado de São Paulo, and an article in Jornal da Tarde published the following day with extensive reports on the army's second campaign in Araguaia. Only in 1978, during the process of political reform, newspapers and magazines began to investigate the Araguaia guerrillas and reclaim them as historical facts.

=== External support ===
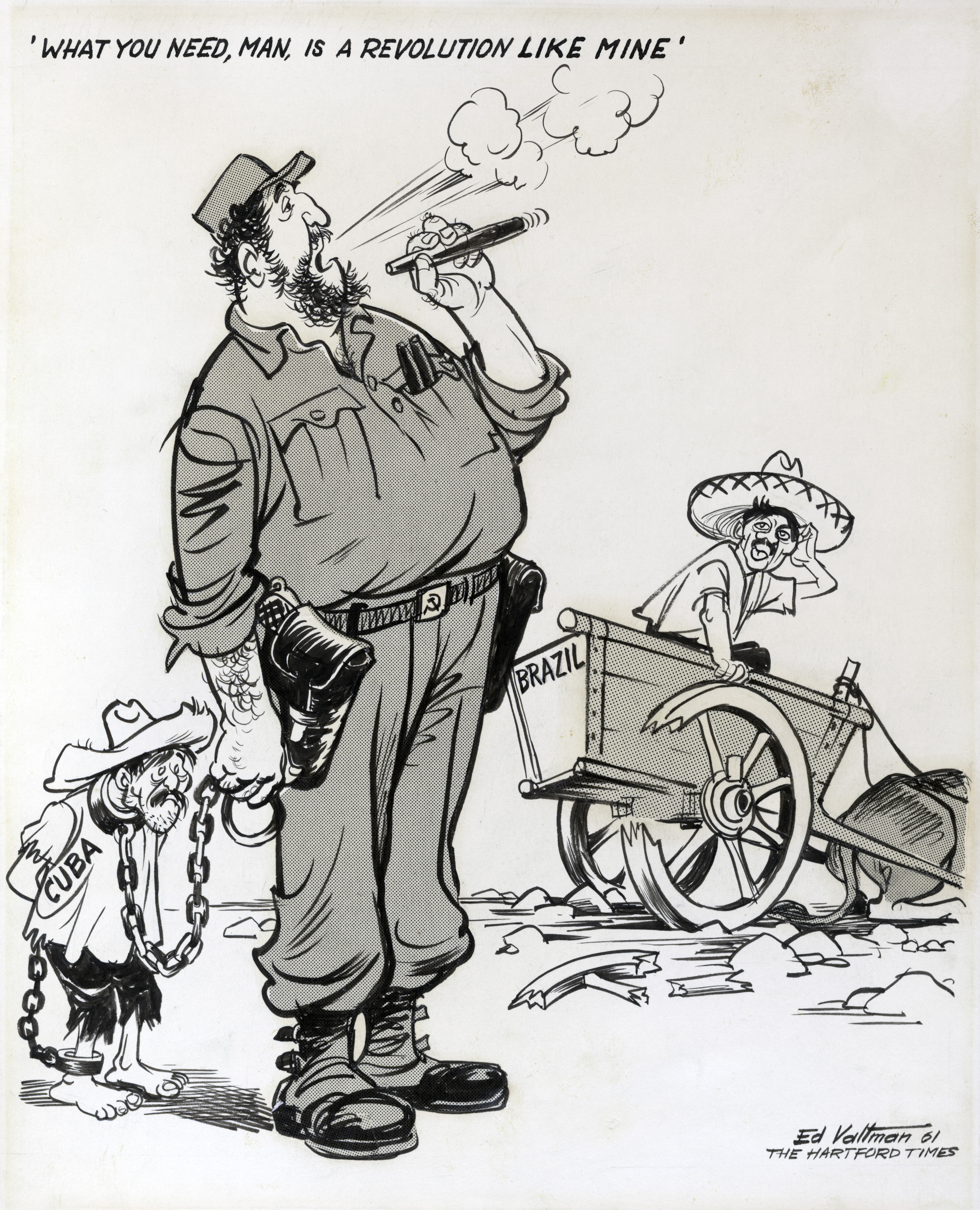
"What you need, man, is a revolution like mine." Valtman portrays Fidel Castro towering above small figures who represent Cuba and Brazil.

Some guerrilla groups received external support from China and Cuba. Before the coup, on March 29, 1964, ten PCdoB militants went to China for a political-military course. Among them were Osvaldo Orlando da Costa, João Carlos Haas Sobrinho, André Grabois, José Humberto Bronca and Paulo Mendes Rodrigues, who in 1967 settled on the banks of the Araguaia River to start rural guerrilla warfare. After abandoning Foquismo and joining Maoism in 1967, the AP also had militants undergoing political-military training in China.

Cuba supported the Brazilians at three different moments. The first was before the military coup, when Francisco Julião's Peasant Leagues received financial support from Cuba. After the dictatorship was established and the Leagues disbanded, Cuban support was transferred to the Nationalist Revolutionary Movement (MNR). After the dismantling of the Caparaó guerrillas, Cuban support shifted to the ANL. From 1967 onwards, Carlos Marighella became the main name of the Brazilian revolution for the Cubans. Until the beginning of 1970, Cuba trained guerrillas not only from the ALN, but also from the VPR and the MR-8, although it considered Marighella's organization to be the most suitable for unleashing the armed struggle in Brazil.

Between July 31 and August 10, 1967, Marighella attended the conference that founded the Latin American Solidarity Organization (OLAS), which signalled his rupture with the PCB. Soon after OLAS was formed, militants linked to Marighella arrived in Cuba to carry out political and military training. According to Marighella, the support did not justify the Cuban government interfering in the course of the Brazilian revolution. He believed that Cuban assistance should not lead to the loss of the organization's autonomy, the surrender of the guerrilla leadership or subservience.

For right-wing groups and the military, external support for the guerrillas was proof of international communism's interference in the direction of Brazil's internal politics. For the left-wing organizations aligned with Foquismo and Maoism, Cuban or Chinese support represented legitimacy and status.

== Amnesty, reparations and justice ==
During the political opening, revolutionaries who had not been killed or disappeared were scattered in prisons and exile. The isolated militants launched successive campaigns to denounce the dictatorship, exposing the systematic use of torture for repressive purposes and gaining the attention of international public opinion. At the time, most of the activists had already abandoned the prospect of armed confrontation. From 1975 onwards, a campaign for amnesty was launched by the Women's Movement for Amnesty (Movimento Feminino pela Anistia - MFPA) and led by Therezinha Zerbini, which found repercussions among Brazilians in exile abroad, where more than thirty committees were formed to fight for amnesty.

In February 1978, the movement acquired strength with the founding of the Brazilian Committee for Amnesty (Comitê Brasileiro pela Anistia - CBA), whose aim was to link the struggle for amnesty with the general democratization of society. In November, the Congress for Amnesty was held, which reinforced the campaign's demands for a "broad, general and unrestricted" amnesty, as well as punishment for torturers, information on the disappeared and the fight for democratic freedoms and social justice. The campaign succeeded in gathering together the opposition to the regime, including the former guerrillas.

In 1979, the campaign for amnesty held several rallies and gained space in the press. In June, in response to pressure from the streets, the government sent its project to Congress and launched the parliamentary debate to regulate an amnesty law. In July 1979, political prisoners began a hunger strike to denounce the exclusionary nature of the bill presented by the government and demand a broad and unrestricted amnesty. Once the bill was sent to Congress, a joint committee of parliamentarians was formed to discuss it. The president of the commission was Senator Teotônio Vilela, from the MDB of Alagoas, who was in favor of the prisoners.

The committee's rapporteur was Ernani Satyro, a deputy from ARENA in Paraíba, who drafted a substitute bill that endorsed the restricted and partial amnesty proposed by the government and rejected the broader alternatives. In an attempt to prevent the approval of this act, a large part of the MDB decided to support a substitute amendment by Djalma Marinho, from ARENA in Rio Grande do Norte, which extended the amnesty to torturers. In a roll-call vote in Congress, the amendment lost by four votes. The leadership vote confirmed Ernani Satyro's substitute, which was sanctioned by President João Figueiredo.

The Amnesty Law approved by the government announced amnesty for those who "committed political crimes or crimes related to political crimes", including torturers and agents of repression, but excluded armed struggle activists accused of murder, who were freed through other legal resources, such as sentence revisions and pardons. State violence during the military dictatorship caused traumas that penetrated society and left the tensions caused by the left-wing guerrillas in the background.

Since 1995, Brazil has adopted a policy of reparations for those affected by the repression, without deepening its policies on justice and memory. The Special Commission on the Dead and Disappeared (Comissão Especial sobre Mortos e Desaparecidos - CEMDP), created during Fernando Henrique Cardoso's government and subordinate to the Ministry of Justice, recognized the responsibility of the federal government in the arbitrary acts of repression that resulted in deaths and disappearances. Since then, amnesty processes have been widely reviewed to correct any injustices and omissions. By 2009, of the 62,000 requests for review, 38,000 had been judged, 23,000 were granted and 10,000 were entitled to economic reparations.

In April 2010, the Order of Attorneys of Brazil (Ordem dos Advogados do Brasil - OAB) filed a request for a review of the Amnesty Law, which was denied by the Supreme Federal Court (STF) based on the argument that this was a task for the legislature. In 2012, during Dilma Rousseff's government, the National Truth Commission (Comissão Nacional da Verdade - CNV) was instituted to clarify the whereabouts of the disappeared and the responsibility of those responsible for human rights violations between 1946 and 1988, although without the power to punish. Its work was accompanied by dozens of complementary regional and institutional commissions.

== Legacy and memory ==
In the second half of the 1970s, opposition movements increased. Liberal, political and business leaders developed an oppositionist narrative critical of the regime, including elements from the moderate political left, which did not advocate armed struggle or the radicalization of social movements. As a result of this convergence, a memory of the military dictatorship became hegemonic, incorporating ideas of liberalism and left-wing criticism. They blamed the radicalism of the left-wing reformists for the fall of João Goulart and condemned the military hard line and the left-wing guerrilla movements, blaming them for the crisis that plunged Brazil into the "Years of Lead".

By rejecting right-wing and left-wing radicalism, the memory attributed identical moral responsibilities to different agents motivated by different values, while creating a political space that incorporated everything from moderate sectors of the Armed Forces to militants from the non-armed left. This memory placed censorship, torture and the lack of civil liberties as consequences of the regime's closure after the pronouncement of AI-5 in 1968, considered to be a hard-line response to radicalized left-wing movements and which ended up victimizing civil society as a whole. The condemnation of the military hard line and the guerrillas formed the basis of this memory, which sought to reconcile post-dictatorship Brazil.

The hegemonic memory of the dictatorship was built fundamentally on liberal foundations, privileging institutional stability and criticizing radical and extra-institutional alternatives. While condemning the military hardliners and guerrillas politically for their "excesses", it also absolved them, in an attempt to placate ideological differences and erase the traumas created by political violence, leading to the reconstruction of a conciliatory and moderate political space. The memory was institutionalized by the 1979 Amnesty Law, which granted amnesty to political prisoners and their torturers. It was drafted by sectors of the liberal and moderate opposition, which neutralized the demands for justice from the leftist groups directly affected by the repression.

The literature of testimony, often written by former guerrillas and which abounded between the end of the 1970s and the beginning of the 1980s, served to solidify the memory. The books Em câmara lenta (1977), by Renato Tapajós, and O Que É Isso, Companheiro? (1979), by Fernando Gabeira, stand out. In these works, the denunciation of torture provides the foundation for the ex-guerrillas' memories of the military dictatorship. The subject of torture had a major impact on public opinion after the release of the book Brasil: Nunca Mais, coordinated by Cardinal Dom Paulo Evaristo Arns, which, for the first time, revealed in a systematic, detailed and documented way the mechanism of repression in Brazil and the forms of torture practiced against prisoners. These documents, which had been clandestinely removed from the archives of the Supreme Military Court (STM), corroborated the testimony of the tortured and were accepted by the judges to mitigate their sentences.

Faced with pressure to investigate the crimes of torture, kidnapping and murder, the military resorted to the Amnesty Law. For them, any effort to expose what happened during the repression of armed and moderate left-wing groups would represent a violation of the principle of amnesty, understood as reciprocal forgetfulness. In response to the left-wing activists' narrative, the military also launched its version of the events. After the release of Brasil: Nunca Mais, Leônidas Pires Gonçalves, then Minister of the Army, commissioned the Army Information Center (CIE) to prepare a response, which would originate the Orvil Project.

The project was finished at the end of 1987 and consisted of a work of more than 900 pages on the several "attempts to seize power" by the communists in Brazil. However, then-president José Sarney did not authorize its publication, and the project remained underground until some of its fragments were published on the internet by the right-wing group Terrorism Never Again (Terrorismo Nunca Mais - TERNUMA). Other responses to the leftist narratives were published by former agents of the repression, such as the books Brasil Sempre (1986), by Marco Pollo Giordani, and Rompendo o Silêncio (1987) by Carlos Alberto Brilhante Ustra. Almost twenty years after the release of his first book, Ustra published A Verdade Sufocada (2006), which provided a more detailed analysis of the actions of leftist groups, revisiting the Communist Intent of 1935, but focusing on the armed groups that operated in the 1960s and 1970s.

Overall, the military's narrative reproduced the official version of the existence of a supposed communist threat that surrounded Brazil between 1935 and 1974, reiterating elements of the National Security Doctrine and Cold War ideology. In some cases, as in Ustra's works, these descriptions are permeated by the notion that civil society lacked the necessary recognition of those who "fought terrorism", demonstrating the military's nonconformity with the memory of the victims and their families, which was gaining ground and demanding that the state recognize its responsibility for the disappearance and death of several people during the dictatorship. The use of torture, if not denied, was explained as necessary to combat the guerrillas, constituting individual "excesses" that were beyond the control of the hierarchies. In September 2014, in a document responding to the National Truth Commission (CMV), the Armed Forces officially admitted that torture and murders may have occurred during the dictatorship, but without admitting that torture may have been used systematically by the repressive apparatus.
