= List of rebellions and revolutions in Brazil =

This article lists major rebellions and revolutions that have taken place during Brazilian history.

== Colonial Brazil (1500–1822) ==
- Vila Rica Revolt (1720)
- Slave rebellions (peaked in the mid-17th century and persisted until abolition)
- Inconfidência Mineira (1789)
- Tailors' Conspiracy (1798)
- Pernambucan revolt (1817)

== Empire of Brazil (1822–1889) ==
- Confederation of the Equator (1824)
- Irish and German Mercenary Soldiers' Revolt (1828)
- Cabanada (1832–1835)
- Malê Revolt (1835)
- Cabanagem (1835–1840)
- Ragamuffin War (1835–1845)
- Sabinada (1837–1838)
- Balaiada (1838–1841)
- Liberal rebellions (1842)
- Praieira revolt (1848)
- Quebra–Quilos revolt (1874–1875)

== Republic (1889–present) ==
=== 1st Republican period (1889–1930) ===
- Naval Revolt (1891–1894)
- Federalist Revolution (1893–1895)
- War of Canudos (1896–97)
- Vaccine Revolt (1904)
- Revolt of the Lash (1910)
- Contestado War (1912–1916)
- Juazeiro Sedition (1913–1914)
- Xandoca's Revolt (1916)
- Anarchist general strikes (1917–1919)
- Tenente revolts (1922–1927)
- Revolution of 1930

=== Vargas era (1930–1945) ===
- Constitutionalist Revolution (July–October 1932)
- Communist uprising (November 1935)
- Integralist putsch (May 1938)

=== 2nd Republican period (1946–1964) ===
- 1964 Brazilian coup d'état

=== Military dictatorship (1964–1985) ===
- Urban guerrillas (1968–1971)
- Frente de Libertação do Nordeste (1971)
- Rural guerrillas
  - Caparaó Guerrilla (1967)
  - Araguaia Guerrilla War (1972–1974)

== See also ==
- Military history of Brazil
