= Caparaó Guerrilla =

Guerrilla conflict in Brazil in 1966–1967

- Part of armed struggle against the Brazilian military dictatorship
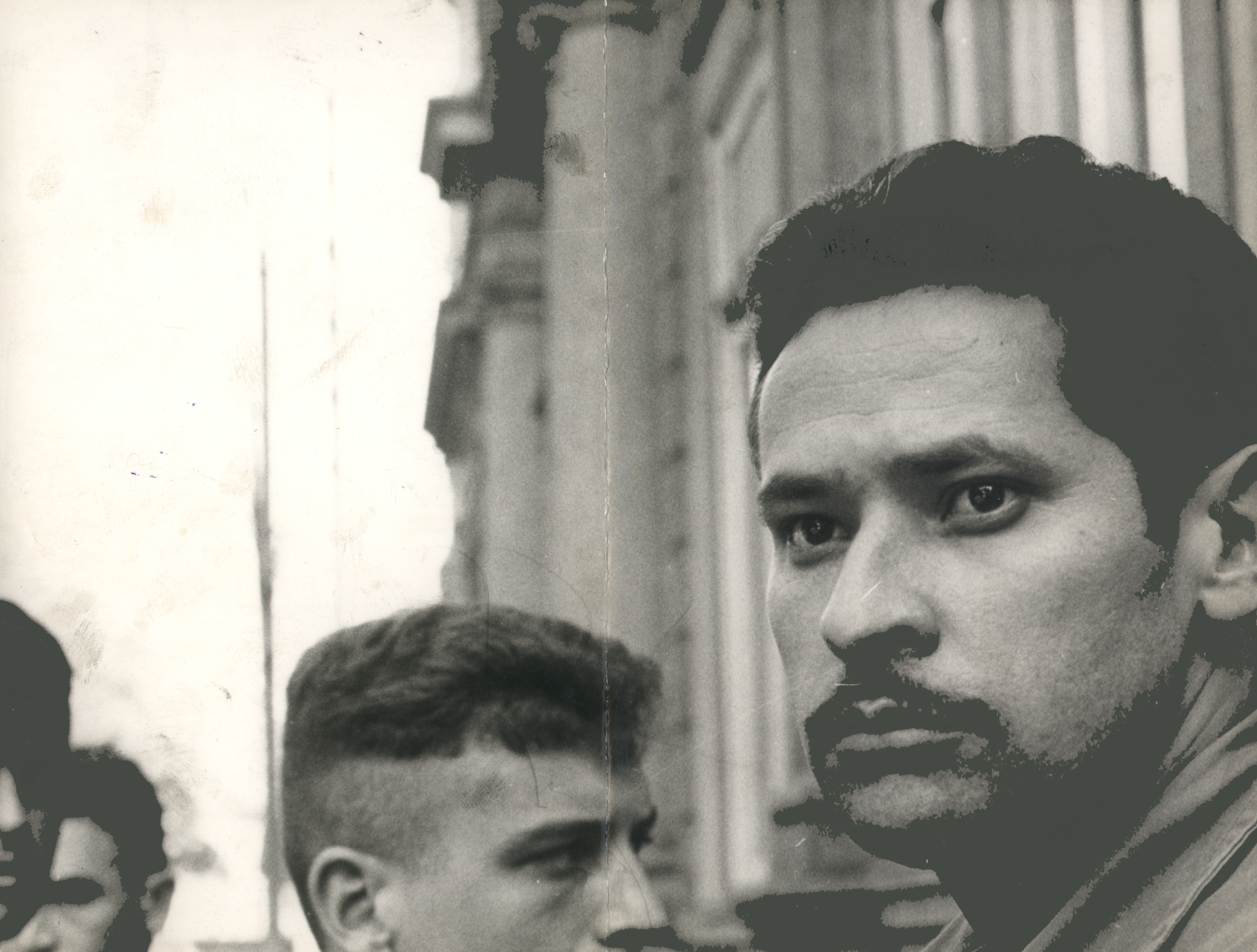
- Caparaó Guerrillas being extended to the Superior Military Court, April 20, 1967.
Date	June, 1966 – April, 1967
Location	Serra do Caparaó, Minas Gerais, Brazil.
Result	Brazilian Government Victory: All MNR members arrested.

Belligerents
Brazilian military government: Brazilian Armed Forces; Minas Gerais Military Police	MNR; Supported by: Cuba; AP

Strength
Unknown	17 militants

Casualties and losses
None	None

The Caparaó Guerrilla was the second armed insurgency attempt against the Brazilian military dictatorship made by impeached former soldiers. Inspired by the Sierra Maestra guerrilla, it took place in the Serra do Caparaó, on the border between the states of Espírito Santo and Minas Gerais, from 1966 to 1967. It was connected to the Três Passos Guerrilla, which occurred earlier.

== History ==
=== Background ===
In April 1964, a coup d'état overthrew João Goulart's Government, starting the Military Dictatorship in Brazil, Leonel Brizola was the only political leader to support the president, sheltering him in Porto Alegre and hoping a bid to rouse the local army units towards the restoration of the toppled regime could be made. But later, he was defeated and exiled in Uruguay. In March 1965, Leonel Brizola, would first try to form an insurrection in Porto Alegre, capital of Rio Grande do Sul state, with ex-military members, forming the Três Passos Guerrilla, making 2 attempts, but he later would be defeated again.

Later the Revolutionary Nationalist Movement (MNR), inspired by Brizola, would start a guerrilla in the Serra do Caparaó.

=== Guerrilla ===
Promoted by the Revolutionary Nationalist Movement (MNR), an organization initially based in Montevideo, the guerrilla had financial support from Cuba, obtained through negotiations between Leonel Brizola, assisted by the A.P (Popular Action), and the Cuban government. According to Denise Rollemberg, some members of the group - mostly made up of ex-soldiers, expelled from the armed forces - also received training in Cuba.

In June, 1966, the MNR establish themselves in the Sítio de Criação de Cabras ('Goat Breeding Site'), in São João do Principe, Iuna, Espirito Santo. Militants were slowly coming to the area. Operations in Serra do Caparaó started in November, when they started entering the interior of the mountain range.

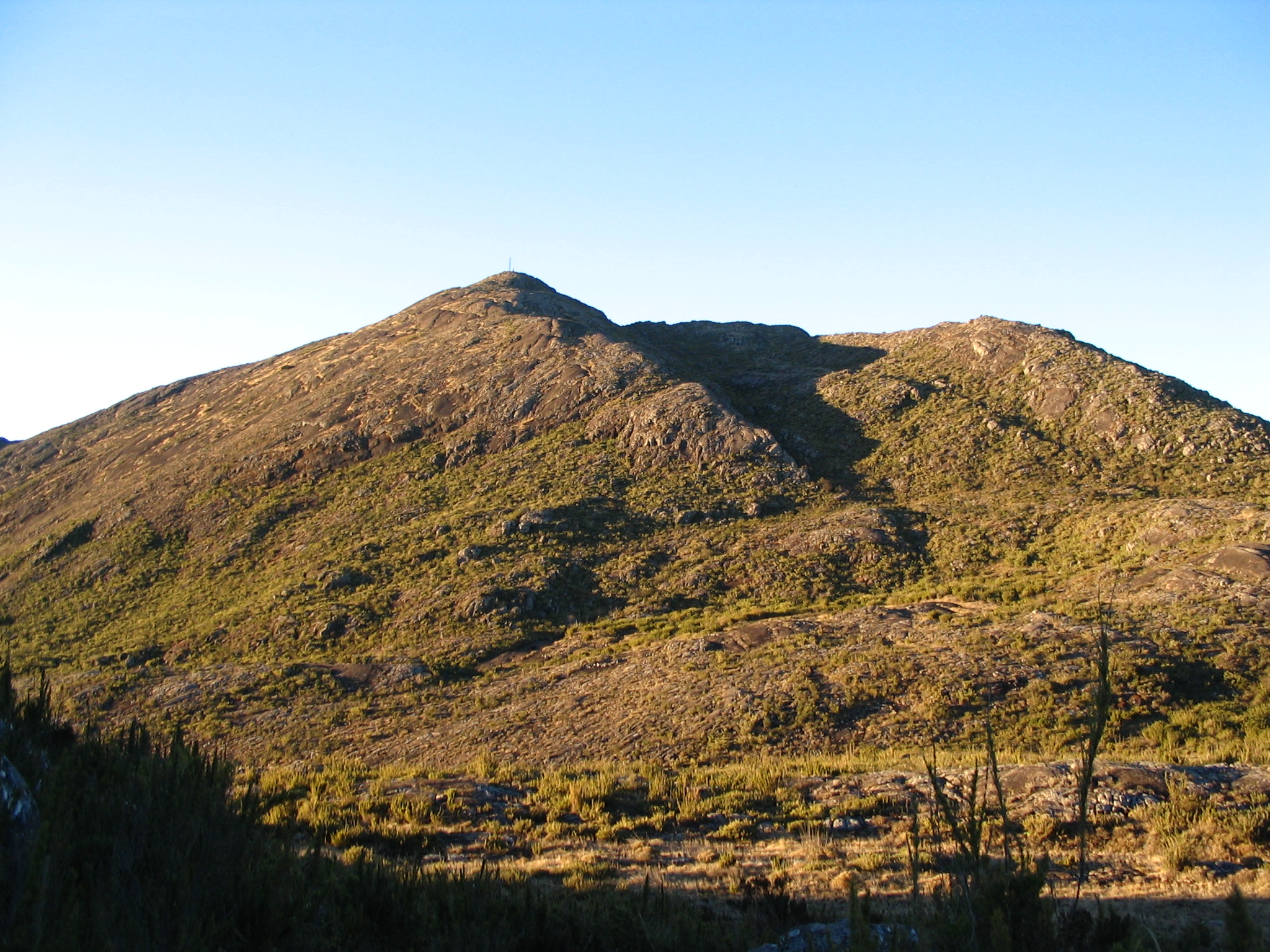
Pico da Bandeira, where the Caparaó Guerrilla took place.

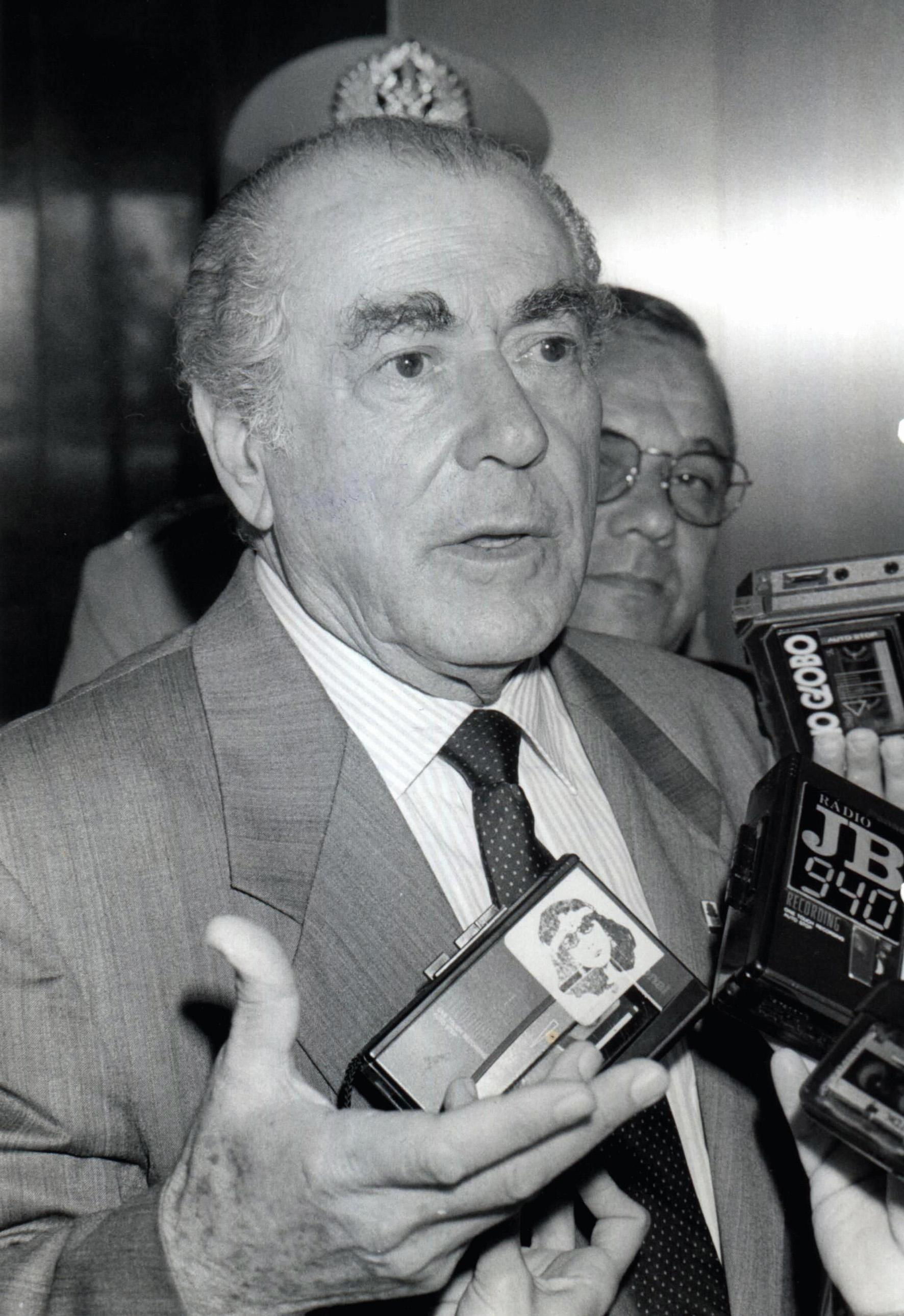
Leonel Brizola, political figure who stood out at this event.

Later, the Cuban government would have preferred to support Carlos Marighella's ALN. The movement lost its financial support and the guerrillas were practically abandoned at the top of the mountains.

The attempt to establish a guerrilla movement in the Caparaó mountain range was frustrated before the movement even took action. Its members remained there for a few months, carrying out training and reconnaissance of the region and were arrested by the Minas Gerais Military Police after being reported by the population themselves. Speak by one of the guerrilla members.

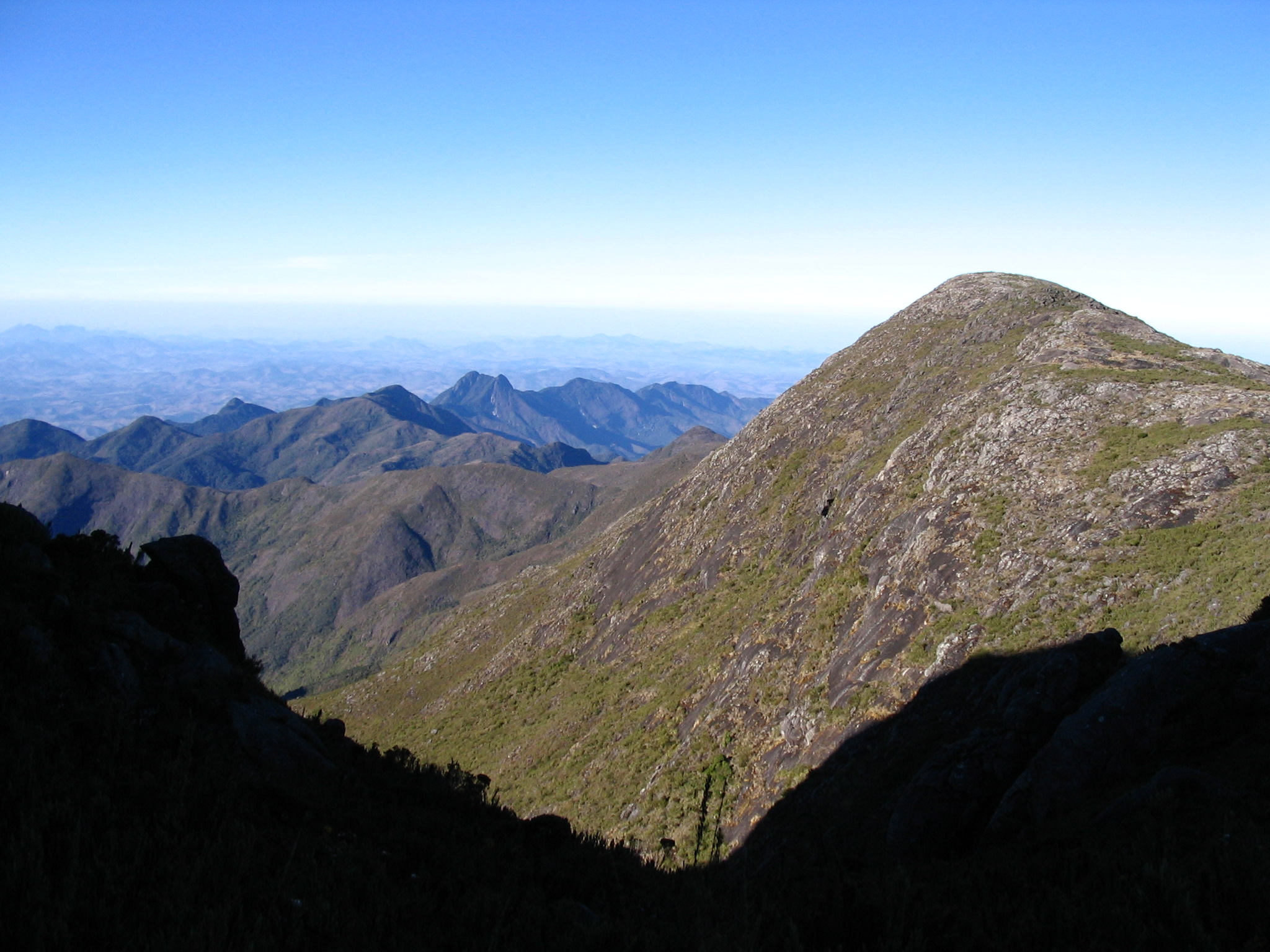
Caparaó National Park.

Discovered by the intelligence services, the movement was rejected in April 1967, by a group from the Military Police of the State of Minas Gerais. According to sources, there was practically no exchange of fire. The guerrillas, around twenty exhausted and hungry men - some seriously weakened by the bubonic plague - were arrested at the site where they were sheltering or in neighboring cities. Residents of the region were also detained for investigation.

Later, with all the guerrillas arrested, the armed forces began to question whether those men were really revolutionaries or just common criminals. Then, the Minas Gerais police photographed them and also photographed their documents, which proved that they were ex-military. A large joint operation between the Army and the Air Force was then set up, with support from the police, to eliminate other guerrillas who might be hiding in the mountains. However, there was no one else and the operation was nothing more than a show of force with the aim of discouraging other outbreaks of armed resistance across the country.

== See also ==
- Revolutionary Nationalist Movement (Brazil)

== Sources ==
- Boiteux, Bayard Demaria. A Guerrilha do Caparaó e outros relatos. Rio de Janeiro: Inverta, 1998. il.
- Botosso, Marcelo. A Guerrilha de Caparaó: A Sierra Maestra Tupiniquim. Ensaios de História (Franca), Franca-SP, v. 4, p. 131-137, 1999
- Costa, José Caldas da. Caparaó - a primeira guerrilha contra a ditadura. Prefácio de Carlos Heitor Cony. São Paulo: Boitempo, 2007. ISBN 978-85-7559-095-9
- Kuperman, Esther. A guerrilha do Caparaó (1966-1967). Rio de Janeiro, 1992. Dissertação (Mestrado em História) – Universidade Federal do Rio de Janeiro
- Rebello, Gilson. A Guerrilha de Caparaó. São Paulo: Alfa-Omega, 1980.
