= Revolutionary Nationalist Movement (Brazil) =

Guerrilla Movement in Brazil of 1966-1967

- Movimento Nacionalista Revolucionário
- Leader: Leonel Brizola
- Dates active: 1966 – 1967
- Country: Brazil
- Active regions: Serra do Caparaó, Minas Gerais, Brazil.
- Ideology: Socialism; Moreno Socialism; Labourism; Brizolism; Left-wing nationalism Foquism; Guevarism
- Status: extinct

The Revolutionary Nationalist Movement (Brazilian Portuguese: Movimento Nacionalista Revolucionário) (MNR) was an organization of Brazilians who opposed the military dictatorship, basically made up of soldiers impeached by the governments of the new regime that intended to defeat them by resorting to armed struggle. Initially influenced by Leonel Brizola who initially had support from Fidel Castro, the organization maintained its leadership in its beginnings in the city of Montevideo, Uruguay. With many disqualified ex-soldiers in its ranks, and some of its members having undergone military training in Cuba, the MNR would be inspired by Che Guevara's Foquism to establish a rural guerrilla focus in Brazil in 1966, first near Criciúma and later in the limits of the Caparaó National Park. Even though it was not the first organization to carry out an armed action against the military government, it would be the first to have a forceful action recognized by the press at the time, capable of reaching public opinion at a national level, when its members were arrested by the Military Police of Minas Gerais at Serra do Caparaó in 1967. Therefore, for a long time it was believed that they would be the first guerrilla focus against the military regime. His attempt to establish a guerrilla focus in the Caparaó National Park region was destroyed before it even began. The arrest effectively resulted in the end of the organization, which did not prevent some of its members from later joining other organizations fighting the military regime such as POLOP or VPR.

== History ==
In exile in Uruguay, first in Montevideo and later in the resort of Atlântida, Brizola coordinated the first attempts to organize the mass of purged ex-military and other political exiles who took refuge in the neighboring country. He obtained financial support from Cuba through his envoy, the former deputy Neiva Moreira and the help of AP (Popular Action) by Herbert de Souza, known as Betinho; thus becoming the main Brazilian political opposition figure in exile, outside the Communist Party. He grouped around him the sergeants and sailors expelled from the corporations and persecuted by the military and formed a kind of General Staff with the former deputy Neiva Moreira, his advisor in the government in Rio Grande do Sul, Paulo Schilling, the former deputy from PSB, Max da Costa Santos, and Colonel Dagoberto Rodrigues.

In Uruguay, Brizola was sought out by the group of ex-sergeants commanded by Amadeu Felipe da Luz Ferreira, a former army sergeant, born in Santa Catarina, member of the PC and political activist since the Legality Campaign in 1961 for Jango's inauguration. Amadeu was looking for support for something that several former sergeants had been planning since they were purged and arrested after the coup: rural guerrilla warfare. At first Brizola did not support the idea, but after the failures of the Rio Grande do Sul uprisings, he decided to support the initiative financially. Brizola joined his closest collaborators such as Paulo Schiling, Flavio Tavares and Neiva Moreira with a group of purged sailors, and created the MNR (Revolutionary Nationalist Movement), with a support base in Rio de Janeiro, commanded by professor Bayard De Marie Boiteaux, former leader of the Brazilian Socialist Party.

The first attempts at insurrection came from former military personnel (see Três Passos Guerrilla) and two attempted uprisings in Rio Grande do Sul organized by Leonel Brizola. At the beginning of 1965, former sergeants Amadeu Felipe and Araken Vaz Galvão, together with former sub-lieutenant Jelcy Rodrigues Corrêa, began to make arrangements, recruiting sergeants from Rio de Janeiro to Rio Grande do Sul and urging them on small groups through the various devices spread across Porto Alegre. It is estimated that 47 men were already in the capital of Rio Grande do Sul. In addition to housing the men, weapons (many from the mobilization of sergeants from Rio Grande do Sul, during the Legality Campaign) and uniforms were also divided among the devices. For security reasons, only Amadeu Felipe and Manoel Raymundo Soares knew their location. However, an unusual event meant that the first uprising operation was postponed, which brought great embarrassment to the group and left Brizola furious. After the two uprising attempts to take Porto Alegre were frustrated, and with no other apparent alternative, the Gaucho leader decided to support the theory of guerrilla outbreaks. Probably, the possibility of counting on the support of the Cuban government was decisive for Brizola's reorientation. Paulo Schilling believes that the Cuban experience has influenced its evolution, from a "typical Getulist position to a revolutionary position". The MNR planned the initial assembly of three guerrilla camps in Brazil: one would be in Serra do Caparaó, led by former sergeant Amadeu Felipe da Luz Ferreira; another would be implemented in the north of Mato Grosso, under the command of former Marine Marco Antônio da Silva Lima. The third, in Central Brazil. The latter, planned for the Goiás region, ended up being concentrated in Imperatriz, west of Maranhão, commanded by former sailor José Duarte. Brizola then made it possible to send 22 fighters for training in Cuba and after a failed attempt to install the guerrilla in Criciúma, he saw the first rural guerrilla focus in Brazil being established in Serra do Caparaó.

However, with the delay in defining an action, and with the rapprochement between Cuba and Mariguella (Fidel preferred to support the latter) the movement lost political strength and financial support, practically leaving the guerrillas abandoned to their own devices at the top of the mountains. When they were arrested by the Military Police of Minas Gerais, the guerrillas were in an internal crisis between army sergeants and sailors, hungry and sick. Through interrogations and the arrest of the Rio group, the base in Rio de Janeiro was quickly dismantled and, to protect Leonel Brizola, the late Professor Bayard Demarie Boiteaux confessed to being the leader of the movement.

== See also ==
- Jefferson Cardim de Alencar Osório
- Armed struggle against the Brazilian military dictatorship
- 8th October Revolutionary Movement
