= Communist Party of Brazil =

Political party in Brazil

Communist Party of Brazil Partido Comunista do Brasil
- Abbreviation: PCdoB
- President: Luciana de Oliveira Santos
- Founded: 25 March 1922; 104 years ago (official); 18 February 1962 (split from PCB)
- Registered: 23 June 1988
- Legalised: 10 May 1985; 41 years ago (Note: Communist Parties legalization in Brazil.)
- Banned: 27 October 1965 (Note: Via Institutional Act no. 2.)
- Split from: Brazilian Communist Party
- Headquarters: Brasília, Brazil
- Newspaper: Classe Operária
- Youth wing: Socialist Youth Union
- Membership (2024): 391,474
- Ideology: Communism (Brazilian); Developmentalism; Historical: Maoism; Hoxhaism
- Political position: Centre-left to left-wing; Historical: Far-left
- National affiliation: Brazil of Hope
- Regional affiliation: São Paulo Forum
- International affiliation: IMCWP
- Colours: Red; Yellow
- TSE Identification Number: 65
- Chamber of Deputies: 11 / 513
- Federal Senate: 0 / 81
- Governorships: 0 / 27
- Mayors: 19 / 5,569
- City Councillors: 354 / 58,026

Party flag

Website
- pcdob.org.br
- Politics of Brazil; Political parties; Elections; A: The PCdoB is a centre-left to left-wing developmentalist party, but has been described as "far-left" by some news outlets because it still de jure supports Marxist–Leninist theory.

The Communist Party of Brazil (Portuguese: Partido Comunista do Brasil, PCdoB) is a political party in Brazil. The PCdoB is a developmentalist party. It has national reach and deep penetration in the trade union and student movements.

PCdoB shares the disputed title of "oldest political party in Brazil" with the Brazilian Communist Party (PCB). The predecessor of both parties was the Brazilian Section of the Communist International, founded on 25 March 1922. The current PCdoB was launched on 18 February 1962, in the aftermath of the Sino-Soviet split, initially having a Maoist guideline, which would later substitute with Hoxhaism in 1978. Outlawed after the 1964 coup d'état, PCdoB supported the armed struggle against the regime before its legalization in 1988. Its most famous action in the period was the Araguaia guerrilla (1966–1974).

After the redemocratization in Brazil, the PCdoB was legalized and adopted a more moderate leftist stance. Since 1989, the party has been allied to the Workers' Party (PT) at the federal level, and, as such, it participated in the Luiz Inácio Lula da Silva administration and joined the "With the Strength of the People" coalition, which elected his successor, Dilma Rousseff. In 2018, the party again allied with PT and the candidacy of Fernando Haddad. Haddad's running mate was PCdoB member Manuela d'Ávila. In 2022 it joined the Brazil of Hope coalition with the PT and the Green Party.

In 2018, after falling to get enough votes to break through the electoral threshold and to keep receiving funds, the Free Fatherland Party (PPL) voted to merge into PCdoB.

PCdoB publishes the newspaper Working Class (Classe Operária) as well as the magazine Principles (Princípios), and is a member of the Foro de São Paulo. Its youth wing is the Union of the Socialist Youth (União da Juventude Socialista, UJS), launched in 1984, while its trade union wing is the Central of the Workers of Brazil (Central dos Trabalhadores e Trabalhadoras do Brasil, CTB), founded in 2007 as a dissidence from the Unified Workers' Central (Central Única dos Trabalhadores, CUT).

== History ==
The Communist Party – Brazilian Section of the Communist International (Partido Comunista – Seção Brasileira da Internacional Comunista, PC-SBIC) was founded on 25 March 1922, gathering Brazilian Communists under the same label until the international rupture in the movement that occurred after the 20th Congress of the Communist Party of the Soviet Union (CPSU) in 1956, and the 5th Congress of the PC-SBIC in 1960, when Brazilian Communists found themselves divided into two tendencies. At the 20th Congress of the CPSU, Nikita Khrushchev had delivered the so-called "Secret Speech", which denounced the abuses committed by the Soviet state under Joseph Stalin's rule. Khrushchev was considered a revisionist by supporters of the late Stalin, which led to a rupture in the Communist movement in various countries.

In Brazil, the rupture reached the party leadership, which had rebuilt PC-SBIC after the setbacks it suffered under the Estado Novo regime (1930–1945), which tried to pit workers against the party and violently repressed it. The party leadership prior to the rupture, primarily composed of revisionists, was formed in 1943 by João Amazonas, Maurício Grabois, Pedro Pomar, Diógenes Arruda Câmara, and Secretary General Luís Carlos Prestes, among others.

=== PC-SBIC (1922–1962) ===
The PC-SBIC was ideologically grounded in the writings of Karl Marx and Friedrich Engels, and in the actions of Vladimir Lenin in the aftermath of the October Revolution, advocating democratic centralism and Marxism–Leninism. It was launched on 25 March 1922 in Niterói, Rio de Janeiro, when members of the Brazilian working class took their first big step towards arranging themselves under a class organization; nine delegates, representing 50 workers, held a Congress and founded the PC-SBIC. On 4 April 1922, it was recognized as a political party by the federal government, with its manifesto being published in the Official Gazette. Following the international guidance, the party was given the name of Communist Party – Brazilian Section of the Communist International.

The nine delegates which attended the founding Congress of the PC-SBIC were Abílio de Nequete, a Lebanese Brazilian barber; Astrojildo Pereira, a journalist from Rio de Janeiro; Cristiano Cordeiro, an accountant from Recife; Hermogênio da Silva Fernandes, an electrician from Cruzeiro; João da Costa Pimenta, a linotype operator; Joaquim Barbosa, a tailor from Rio de Janeiro; José Elias da Silva, a shoemaker from Rio de Janeiro; Luís Peres, a broom seller from Rio de Janeiro; and Manuel Cendón, a Spanish-born tailor.

A series of influential parties in the Brazilian political scene emerged from the PC-SBIC, such as the Brazilian Communist Party (PCB) and the Revolutionary Communist Party (PCR), in addition to many Trotskyist and Stalinist groups. The international rupture that arose in the Communist movement after 1956 caused the PC-SBIC to split on 18 February 1962, during its 5th National Congress. At the occasion, the Manifesto – Program, which advocated the disassociation of the party with the Communist International, was approved, and the party took the name of Communist Party of Brazil (Partido Comunista do Brasil, PCdoB).

=== Schisms ===
The version of the Hammer and Sickle used as the logo of the Communist Party of Brazil (Red Fraction)

- The Trotskyist Dissence (1928): In mid-1928, PC-SBIC suffered its first schism, when a small group of Marxist intellectuals broke with the political theses of PC-SBIC influenced by Leon Trotsky's Left Opposition, and its criticism of Stalinism prevailing as the official ideology of the Communist International and the Communist Party of the Soviet Union.
- Brazilian Communist Party (1961): In 1961, the "revisionist" group held an Extraordinary National Conference, adopting a new program, a new statute, replacing the main body of the party (The Working Class), and adopting the name of Brazilian Communist Party, keeping the acronym of PCB, until then popularly used to identify PC-SBIC. The maneuver was led by Luís Carlos Prestes, which claimed that the move made it possible for PC-SBIC to regain its legal registration – which was ultimately not obtained. The Marxist–Leninist group claimed that Prestes' move broke PC-SBIC's statute and was, therefore, illegal according to the party rules. They launched a document called The Hundred Men Letter, claiming the implementation of an extraordinary congress to validate the changes. It also criticized the new party line, accusing it of being "right-wing and opportunistic." After that, the self called "anti-revisionist" group adopted the name of Communist Party of Brazil and the acronym of PCdoB to differentiate themselves from PCB.
- Communist Revolutionary Party (1968): The Revolutionary Communist Party (Partido Comunista Revolucionário, PCR) emerged as an internal split of PCdoB in 1966, four years after the split of PC-SBIC into two parties. It was formed by activists of the student movement and the peasant leagues (a pro-agrarian reform group, considered the predecessor of MST). Its party line was that of Mao Zedong's people's war, aiming to besiege the cities from the countryside, considering the Northeast Region the best area to trigger the revolution.
- PCdoB's Red Wing (1968)
- Revolutionary Communist Party (1979)
- Communist Party of Brazil (formerly Red Fraction) (1990s): The Partido Comunista do Brasil – Fração Vermelha originated as an anti-revisionist split of the Communist Party of Brazil in the 1990s. In late 2022 they began appearing as the "Communist Party of Brazil" on documents, removing "Red Fraction" from their name. They are a founding member of the International Communist League (ICL) and currently uphold an ideology they describe as "Marxism-Leninism-Maoism principally Maoism with the Contributions of Universal Validity of Chairman Gonzalo".

=== Reorganization ===
==== First reorganization (1943) ====
The National Party Conference (Conference of Mantiqueira) was held on 11 August 1943, in the era of Estado Novo, with delegates from Rio, São Paulo, Minas Gerais, Paraná, Rio Grande do Sul, Bahia, Sergipe, and Paraíba. This conference would play an enormous role in party life. The Conference reviewed the political situation and the tasks of the Party, politics, and tasks of construction and rebuilding to which it must attend. A new Central Committee was elected, for the old leadership and the party organization was almost torn apart due to arrests by the police. Defeated factions dissolved, and a need to reorganize the party was established, as well as an outlining the tasks of communists in the struggle against fascism, and a declaration of war on the Axis, sending an expeditionary force to fight in Europe. Many Communists marched willingly into the theater of operations in Italy, and the Party organized a broad movement in solidarity with the Brazilian Expeditionary Force (FEB). On 1 August 1950, the Manifesto of August, was released to the public from the Central Committee of Communist Party of Brazil. An attempt to break with the remnants of the "right-wing" and "opportunist" line of the period under review, the Manifesto presented, in essence, a revolutionary line, urging the people to overthrow the regime of landlords and capitalists in the service of American imperialism, and to provide for this a popular army.

==== Second reorganization (1962) ====
At the 5th National Conference Meetings, held on 18 February 1962, in São Paulo, with the dissent of Marxist-Leninist tendencies, the party was reorganized. Delegates from Guanabara, São Paulo, Rio, Rio Grande do Sul and Espirito Santo were in attendance. Embracing the acronym and symbol PCdoB, the party was proclaimed the legitimate successor of the Communist Party – Brazilian Section of the Communist International (PC-SBIC). This conference marked a break with Luís Carlos Prestes, who had usurped the party leadership in 1943 and reorganized it along a revisionist line. In opposition to the revisionist line of the 5th Congress, the Conference adopted the Manifesto-Program, which draws a revolutionary line, reintroduced the Statute adopted at the Fourth Congress, adopted a resolution on the unity of the Communists, signed the principle that each country can only exist a single Marxist–Leninist party, decided to reissue The Working Class, a former central organ of the Party, approved the break with the USSR, and, finally, elected a new Central Committee. These historic resolutions mark not only a decisive break with the revisionists, but also purposed the organization of a true Marxist–Leninist vanguard in this conference Brazil. These meetings were attended by Joao Amazonas, Mauricio Grabois, Camara Ferreira, Mário Alves, Jacob Gorender, Miguel Batista de Carvalho, and Apollonius.

=== Maoist guideline (1962–1969) ===
The crisis between the Soviet Union and China reached its peak when the Chinese leader Mao Zedong criticized the ongoing process of de-Stalinization in the USSR, and accused Khrushchev of "opportunistic" and "reformist" deviations. A division of Mao with the rest of the communist movement attracted the sympathy of the PCdoB, who sent emissaries to Beijing to formalize the ideological link with the new ideological guidelines of the Chinese Communist Party. Among these messengers was the party's exiled former president, Joao Amazonas, who was received by Mao Zedong. Subsequently, the party gravitated towards Maoism, considering only China and Albania socialist countries, and asserting that others were no longer revolutionary, but revisionist.

However, adherence to Maoism included a shift in the strategies of the PCdoB. Following the principle of protracted people's war, PCdoB undertook to transfer ideology to the field, initiating the formation of a peasant army. This conception of revolutionary struggle contrasted with both the traditional tactics of the PCB (which true to the "peaceful path" opposed the armed struggle against the dictatorship) and with Foco new forces such as the MR-8 and the ALN, which prioritized the urban guerrilla and focus as a way of fighting the military government established in 1964.

The final adoption of Maoism by the PCdoB was in 1966 at its 6th Congress. The following year, the party drew up a declaration in support of the Cultural Revolution underway in China. In 1968, PCdoB suffered two internal splits: the Red Wing of PCdoB (favorable to foquista tactics) and the Revolutionary Communist Party (PCR).

=== Araguaia guerrilla (1969–1976) ===
Forward from 1966, PCdoB sought to form a nucleus guerrilla camp. The area chosen for the irradiation of the future peasant army (along a Maoist line) was a region south of Para, near the border with Tocantins. It is estimated that the party met 70–80 guerrillas in the area under the military command of former military Osvaldo Orlando da Costa (Osvaldão) and under the command of Mauritius maximum Grabois (then commander in chief of the guerrillas).

The most effective guerrilla of the PCdoB column (under the name "Araguaia Guerrilla Force") was composed of high school and college students, organized around the Patriotic Union of Youth (UJP, youth wing of the party), professionals, and workers mainly from São Paulo and Minas Gerais. As there was originally little adhesion between locals, the party created the Freedom Union and the People's Rights (ULDP), whose manifesto contained the programmatic basis of the guerrillas.

In 1971, Army units discovered the location of the guerrilla nucleus and were deployed to cordon off the area, preventing it from spreading its operations to the north of the Amazon. The repression of guerrilla operations began in 1972, with three military expeditions that mobilized 25,000 soldiers. While the first two were repelled, the third expedition defeated the last pockets of resistance. Most of the guerillas died in clash with Army forces, including Osvaldão Grabois and Maurice, who died in confrontation with the Army on 25 December 1973. In the 3rd campaign of annihilation, the Army used "dirty tactics", including torture of civilians, and execution and beheading of prisoners, hiding the bodies where they would remain unknown for decades.

The defeat of the Araguaia would establish the ideal of the PCdoB guerrillas as the most effective and experienced of armed struggle the dictatorship. Most of the dead in the repression of the military regime between 1964 and 1979 would be PCdoB militants. The Araguaia Guerrilla redefined the dictatorship's plans for the Amazon region, whose repressions in the region were hidden long after the dictatorship's fall.

=== Abandonment of Maoism (1976–1979) ===
In the late 1960s, Marxist–Leninist Popular Action (APML), a group derived from the Catholic left, adopted a Maoist ideology and approached the PCdoB. The two groups were merged in 1975, after the end of armed struggle. PCdoB also attracted former members of Pcbr and MR-8.

On 16 December 1976, the DOI-Codi-SP invaded a house on Pius XI Street, São Paulo, killing Pedro Pomar and Ângelo Arroio, torturing João Batista Drumond to death, and taking prisoner Wladimir Pomar (son of Pedro), Aldo Arantes, Haroldo Lima, and Elza Monnerat (the latter two former members of the AP), in an episode that would become known as the Massacre or Slaughter of Lapa. In a climate where the opposition was beginning to gain strength, news coverage of the event resulted in shock and emotion within and outside Brazil. The party leadership, hit hard, began to operate with a core base in exile. Years later, it was discovered that the operation had the help of an informer arrested that year, the head of the PCdoB, Manoel Jover Teles (ex CC member of the PCB and former Pcbr), who was subsequently expelled from the party in 1983.

Shorn of its main cadres, PCdoB began to regroup with staff from the PA leadership and staff of João Amazonas, who, with Diógenes Arruda, were the last remnants of the group that rebuilt the party in 1962. Arruda's death (in 1979) left Amazonas as Secretary of the PCdoB until his death.

Observing the failure of the rural guerrilla and the new policy adopted by China since Mao's death in 1976, PCdoB decided to break with Maoism. In 1978, the party followed Enver Hoxha in his criticism of Chinese leaders, and considered Albania alone as a socialist country, the last bulwark of Marxism-Leninism.

During this period, an internal split in the PCdoB led to the formation of the Revolutionary Communist Party (PRC), led by José Genoíno and Tarso Genro, which would later join the Workers Party (PT) alongside the Ala Vermelha or Red Wing.

=== Path to legalization (1979–1987) ===
The adoption of the new Albanian line did not mean the political radicalization of the PCdoB. In 1978, the party had begun participating in institutional action through the MDB, the moderate opposition to the military government. PCdoB resumed its parliamentary activity and secretly elected its first MPs from within the MDB.

In 1979, with the granting of Amnesty, PCdoB found a favorable environment for their penetration of the unions and student organizations. John Amazonas returned from exile in 1979, and Diogenes Arruda died of a heart attack in the car on the way to a political act. The rebuilding of UNE (1979) with Aldo Rebelo marked the beginning of the hegemony of the party in university entity (continuing ever since, except for the biennium 1987–1988). In 1984, PCdoB founded the Union of Socialist Youth (UJS), its youth wing.

In unionism, PCdoB initially adopted a policy of alliance with trade unionists linked to the PCB, adhering to CONCLAT in 1983, which included moderates and non-Marxists. The party was opposed to the CUT (trade union arm of the PT). In 1984, PCdoB integrated into the Direct Elections Now movement (formed by all opposition parties). The following year, with the defeat of the Dante de Oliveira amendment which would have provided for the direct election of Presidents, the party nominated Tancredo Neves as their candidate in the Electoral College, with the joint support of the PCB and MR8, in application for the democratization and legalization of leftist parties, which would be obtained in 1985. In elections to the Constituent Assembly of 1986, PCdoB elected six deputies, including Haroldo Lima, and Aldo Arantes. Of these, three were originally elected as part of the PMDB, with which they remained an ally, as part of the base of support for the government of Jose Sarney.

=== A socialist program (1987–1995) ===
The social and economic crisis that followed the Cruzado Plan (1987) led PCdoB to break the PMDB. In its place, the party sought a broader alliance with the PT and the PSB. In 1988, trade unionists PCdoB broke with the General Workers Central and formed the current Class Union, which then became part of the CUT, currently connected to the CTB (see Recent Events).

In 1989, along with the PSB, PCdoB supported the candidacy of PT's Luiz Inácio Lula da Silva for the presidency. The alliance with the PT for the presidential elections was repeated in the elections of 1994, 1998, 2002, and 2006, achieving success in the last two, with the vice president of the ticket, the political and textile businessman José Alencar, from the PL.

Also with the PT, PCdoB also was in opposition to the government of Fernando Collor. PCdoB argued for his removal, which occurred in September 1992 with large student demonstrations, participated in by the UJS along with the UBEs and UNE. At that time, they noted the personal leadership of Lindberg Farias, then president of the UNE and militant member of the PCdoB. Alongside the adoption of a more radical stance internally, PCdoB began to lose its external references. In 1990, a year after the fall of the Berlin Wall, the Albanian regime also collapsed, and, with it, Stalinism was in crisis. The main impact of these changes was the decision of PCdoB at its 8th Congress in 1992, with the slogan Vive Socialism, that Stalinism had failed, and to move closer to "classical" Marxism.

That decision opened the party ideologically and allowed the incorporation of new members and alliances. PCdoB resumed ties with Cuba, and, in 1995, at its 8th conference, the party adopted its Socialist Programme. Several Communist intellectuals previously attached to the PCB (as Nelson Werneck Sodré and Edgard Carone) also approached the PCdoB.

During this period, with the fall of the socialist bloc in Eastern Europe, PCdoB regarded itself as in a phase of "strategic defensive", i.e. a period of the retraction of socialist ideas, motivating the need for an accumulation of forces to advance an offensive stage.

=== Lula administration and opposition to neoliberalism ===
In the late 1980s, PCdoB supported the formation of a popular front to launch Luiz Inácio Lula da Silva's candidacy for President. Since then, it has been a member of all electoral coalitions led by the Workers' Party (PT) at the federal level. It has also allied itself with the PT in most states and capitals.

The PCdoB has registered a generally steady increase in its number of seats in the National Congress since the 1986 elections, the first parliamentary elections which the party contested. It elected 3 deputies in 1986, 5 in 1990, 10 in 1994, 7 in 1998, 12 in 2002, 13 in 2006, and 15 in 2010. In 2000, PCdoB elected its first mayor, Luciana Santos (Olinda). In 2006, it elected its first Senator ever, Inácio Arruda (although the party considers Luís Carlos Prestes, from PC-SBIC, its first Senator.) He was joined by their second Senator, Vanessa Grazziotin, in 2010. Since 2001, the party is led by Renato Rabelo (a former member of the Popular Action guerrilla group), who succeeded João Amazonas who died in the following year.

With the victory of Lula in 2002, PCdoB became part of the federal government, occupying the Ministry of Sports; first with Agnelo Queiroz, and later with Orlando Silva. This was the first time that a Communist occupied a Ministry of the Brazilian state. PCdoB's influence over the federal government was expanded in 2004, with the appointment of deputy Aldo Rebelo as political coordinator for the government. The following year, he assumed the presidency of the Chamber of Deputies with the resignation of Severino Cavalcanti. On 16 November 2006, Aldo Rebelo took over the presidency for one day, making him the only Communist President of Brazil. PCdoB also managed to get some participation in the Senate for a brief period of time, when Senator Leomar Quintanilha (formerly a member of PMDB) switched parties.

Although critical of the economic policy of the Lula administration, PCdoB maintained its support to PT. In 2006, when Lula sought his re-election, the party formalized its participation in his alliance. That same year, PCdoB achieved its first municipal administration of a state capital when PT's Marcelo Déda resigned in order to run as Governor of Sergipe and Edvaldo Nogueira took office as mayor of Aracaju. At the end of 2007, its divergences with PT began to increase, and PCdoB abandoned the Central Única dos Trabalhadores (CUT) trade union organization, and, along with the Brazilian Socialist Party and other independent sections of the union movement, it founded the Central of Male and Female Workers of Brazil (CTB).

In 2005, the XI Party Congress was held and recast its status, and, among other innovations, admitted for the first time the distinction between "affiliated" and "militant" – this was for subsidiaries to help finance the party and fulfill its obligations. This move is seen as a step toward the massification of the Communist Party of Brazil.

On 21–23 November 2008, PCdoB hosted the 10th International Meeting of Communist and Workers Parties, which gathered 65 communist and labour parties from around the world, an event which had never been hosted in Latin America. That same year, it had its largest expansion of local representation, electing 40 mayors; some of them in big cities such as Aracaju, Olinda, Maranguape, and Juazeiro.

In 2009, at the 12th Congress, PCdoB adopted a new Socialist Program, entitled "Strengthening the Nation is the way, socialism is the way!" It covers only the initial phase of transition to socialism, determining the need for collective party action on some issues in the immediate to medium term.

== Structure ==
PCdoB was legally recognized as a political party by the Brazilian Electoral Supreme Court on 23 June 1988. Its current President is Luciana Santos. It has nearly 240,000 members.

== Ideology ==
PCdoB responded to the collapse of communist regimes in Eastern Europe and the dissolution of the Soviet Union better than most Western communist parties. PCdoB originally established itself as an organization historically linked to the Marxist-Leninist tradition of the Communist International. Its political and ideological identity was consolidated as opposing the so-called 1960s "revisionism", identified with the directions taken by the USSR after the 20th Congress of the Communist Party of the Soviet Union. PCdoB then aligned itself with Maoism. After the People's Republic of China began making economic reforms in 1979, PCdoB decided to align itself with the Socialist People's Republic of Albania, an example of consistency and fidelity to Marxism–Leninism in the opinion of its leaders.

In the 1980s, the Soviet crisis was assessed by PCdoB as the result of the growing integration of the USSR with capitalism and the "social-imperialistic" policies applied by it; the Soviet regime was characterized as a kind of state capitalism. In 1991, as the crisis had reached Albania, PCdoB decided to reassess its theoretical formulations about revisionism, and became nonaligned. At its 8th Congress in 1992, PCdoB innovated itself by criticizing the Bolshevik experience. The party reaffirmed its adherence to Marxism–Leninism and socialism, taking a different path from several other Communist organizations throughout the world.

During this process, PCdoB ranged from an approach that pointed to the class struggle as responsible for the fundamental changes that occurred in the Soviet regime, while on the other hand, it showed an economistic tendency, placing the problems of socialism around the development of productive forces. To some extent, it has shifted from debating these fundamental issues, and, when it did, it treated them marginally.

The party has also been marked by a growing institutionalization inside the political system. This can be perceived in a letter sent to the Communist Party USA on the occasion of its 29th National Convention in 2010. In it, PCdoB demonstrated its concern over the euro area crisis and blamed neoliberalism. The party lists its electoral goals for the 2010 general elections as being the "consolidation of Communist presence in the institutions", the "enlargement of influence on lower classes" and "maintaining the democratic and progressive forces at the head of the national government".

== Congresses of the Communist Party of Brazil ==
Name	Dates	Place
1st	25–27 March 1922	Niterói
2nd	16–18 May 1925	
3rd	December 1928 – January 1929	
4th	November 1954	
5th	August–September 1960	
6th (Note: Clandestine)	1983	
7th	May 1988	São Paulo
8th	3–8 February 1992	Brasília
9th	13–15 October 1997	São Paulo
10th	9–12 December 2001	Rio de Janeiro
11th	20–23 October 2005	Brasília
12th	5–8 November 2009	São Paulo
13th	14–16 November 2013	São Paulo
14th	17–19 November 2017	Brasilia
15th	15–17 October 2021	None (via videoconference)

== Election results ==
=== Presidential elections ===
Election	Candidate	Running mate	Coalition	First round		Second round		Result
Election	Candidate	Running mate	Coalition	Votes	%	Votes	%	Result
1989	Luiz Inácio Lula da Silva (PT)	José Paulo Bisol (PSB)	PT; PSB; PCdoB	11,622,673	17.2% (#2)	31,076,364	47.0% (#2)	Lost ✗
1994	Luiz Inácio Lula da Silva (PT)	Aloizio Mercadante (PT)	PT; PSB; PCdoB; PPS; PV; PSTU	17,122,127	27.0% (#2)	—	—	Lost ✗
1998	Luiz Inácio Lula da Silva (PT)	Leonel Brizola (PDT)	PT; PDT; PSB; PCdoB; PCB	21,475,211	31.7% (#2)	—	—	Lost ✗
2002	Luiz Inácio Lula da Silva (PT)	José Alencar (PL)	PT; PL; PCdoB; PMN; PCB	39,455,233	46.4% (#1)	52,793,364	61.3% (#1)	Elected ✓
2006	Luiz Inácio Lula da Silva (PT)	José Alencar (PRB)	PT; PRB; PCdoB	46,662,365	48.6% (#1)	58,295,042	60.8% (#1)	Elected ✓
2010	Dilma Rousseff (PT)	Michel Temer (PMDB)	PT; PMDB; PR; PSB; PDT; PCdoB; PSC; PRB; PTC; PTN	47,651,434	46.9% (#1)	55,752,529	56.1% (#1)	Elected ✓
2014	Dilma Rousseff (PT)	Michel Temer (PMDB)	PT; PMDB; PSD; PP; PR; PDT; PRB; PROS; PCdoB	43,267,668	41.6% (#1)	54,501,118	51.64% (#1)	Elected ✓
2018	Fernando Haddad (PT)	Manuela d'Ávila (PCdoB)	PT; PCdoB; PROS	31,341,997	29.3% (#2)	47,040,380	44.8% (#2)	Lost ✗
2022	Luiz Inácio Lula da Silva (PT)	Geraldo Alckmin (PSB)	PT; PCdoB; PV; PSOL; REDE; PSB; Solidariedade; Avante; Agir	57,295,504	48.4% (#1)	60,345,999	50.9% (#1)	Elected ✓
2026	Luiz Inácio Lula da Silva (PT)	Geraldo Alckmin (PSB)	PT; PCdoB; PV; PSOL; REDE; PSB; PDT	53,879,538	45.16% (#2)	64,256,232	51.79% (#1)	Elected ✓
Source: Election Resources: Federal Elections in Brazil – Results Lookup

=== Legislative elections ===
Election	Chamber of Deputies				Federal Senate				Role in government
Election	Votes	%	Seats	+/–	Votes	%	Seats	+/–	Role in government
1986	297,237	0.63%	3 / 487	New	N/A	N/A	0 / 49	New	Opposition
1990	352,049	0.87%	5 / 502	▲2	N/A	N/A	0 / 31	0	Opposition
1994	567,186	1.24%	10 / 513	▲5	751,428	0.78%	0 / 54	0	Opposition
1998	869,270	1.30%	7 / 513	▼3	559,218	0.90%	0 / 81	0	Opposition
2002	1,967,847	2.25%	12 / 513	▲5	6,199,237	4.03%	0 / 81	0	Coalition
2006	1,982,323	2.13%	13 / 513	▲1	6,364,019	7.54%	2 / 81	▲2	Coalition
2010	2,748,290	2.85%	15 / 513	▲2	12,561,716	7.37%	2 / 81	0	Coalition
2014	1,913,015	1.97%	10 / 513	▼5	803,144	0.90%	1 / 81	▼1	Coalition (2014–2016)
2014	1,913,015	1.97%	10 / 513	▼5	803,144	0.90%	1 / 81	▼1	Opposition (2016–2018)
2018	1,329,575	1.35%	9 / 513	▼1	24,785,670	14.5%	0 / 81	▼1	Opposition
2022	1,154,712	1.06%	6 / 513	▼3	299,013	0.29%	0 / 81	0	Coalition
2026	1,306,368	1.15%	11 / 513	▲5	Didn't contest		0 / 81	0	Coalition
Sources: Election Resources, Dados Eleitorais do Brasil (1982–2006)

== Famous members ==
- Jandira Feghali
- João Amazonas †
- Jorge Mautner
- Leci Brandão
- Daiana Santos
- Manuela d'Ávila
- Martinho da Vila
- Maurício Grabois †
- Nasi
- Vanessa Grazziotin
- Abílio de Nequete †
- Elias Jabbour

== See also ==
- List of political parties in Brazil
- List of communist parties
- Politics of Brazil

== Bibliography ==
- Fernandes, Sabrina (2019). Sintomas Mórbidos: A Encruzilhadada da Esquerda Brasileira (in Portuguese). São Paulo: Autonomia Literária. ISBN 978-8569536499.

Preceded by 55 – SDP (PSD)	Numbers of Brazilian Official Political Parties; 65 – CPofB (PCdoB)	Succeeded by 70 – AVANTE
