= Araguaia Guerrilla War =

Brazilian guerrilla movement

Araguaia guerrilla
- Part of the armed struggle against the Brazilian military dictatorship
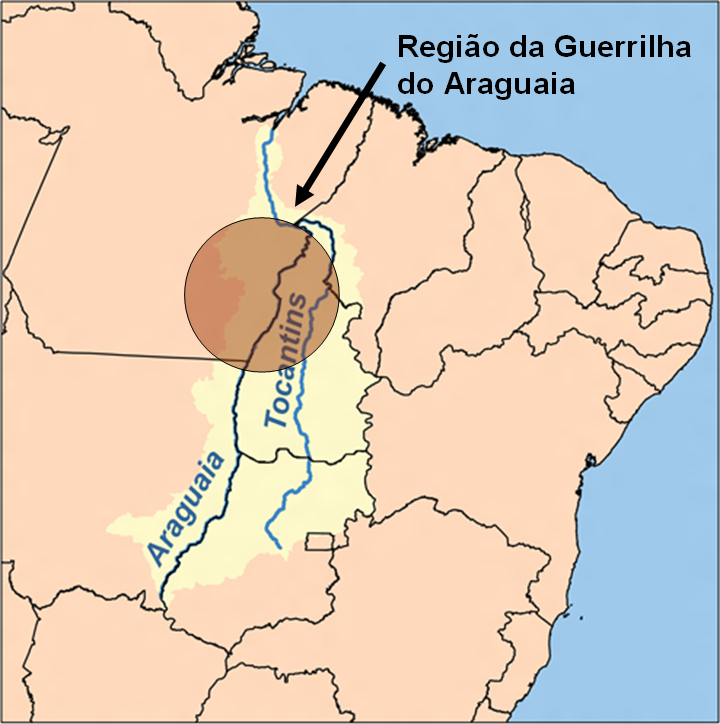
- Araguaia River banks, with the area of guerrilla activity
Date	1966–1975 (Main phase: 1972–1974)
Location	Araguaia River, State of Goiás (Current State of Tocantins), Brazil
Result	Government victory; Successful counter-insurgency operation; Guerrillas failed to gain popular support; Guerrilla forces exterminated

Belligerents
Brazilian military government; Brazilian Army; Brazilian Air Force; Brazilian Navy	Communist Party of Brazil; Supported by: People's Socialist Republic of Albania

Commanders and leaders
Emílio Garrastazu Médici; Ernesto Geisel; Orlando Geisel; Milton Tavares de Souza; Olavo Viana Moog; Hugo de Abreu; Antônio Bandeira	João Amazonas; Maurício Grabois (executed); Elza Monnerat; Ângelo Arroyo †; João Carlos Haas Sobrinho †; Dinalva Oliveira Teixeira (executed); Osvaldo Orlando da Costa †

Strength
5,000 army soldiers 300 marines	80–150 guerrillas

Casualties and losses
Unknown	90+ dead or missing

The Araguaia guerrilla (Portuguese: Guerrilha do Araguaia) was an armed movement in Brazil against its military government, active between 1967 and 1974 in the Araguaia river basin. It was founded by militants of the Communist Party of Brazil (PC do B), the then Maoist counterpart to the Brazilian Communist Party (PCB), which aimed at establishing a rural stronghold from whence to wage a "people's war" against the Brazilian military dictatorship, which had been in power since the 1964 coup d'état. Its projected activities were based on the successful experiences led by the 26th of July Movement in the Cuban Revolution, and by the Chinese Communist Party during the Chinese Civil War.

The Araguaia guerrilla remained virtually unknown to the broader Brazilian public during the military dictatorship, as strict censorship and official secrecy suppressed reporting on the conflict and evidence of the operations was systematically erased; details only began to emerge during the country's political liberalization and redemocratization period. The conflict also remained a taboo subject within the Brazilian Armed Forces, where it was seldom discussed publicly, even by veterans who had taken part in the campaign.

== Outset ==
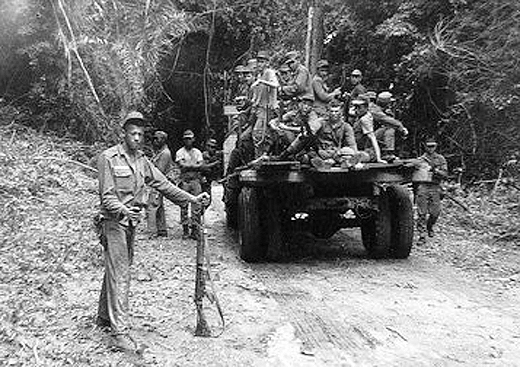
First Army troops to arrive in Araguaia, 1972.

The idea of setting up a focus of rural guerrilla that could function as a pole of attraction for all elements dissatisfied with the Brazilian military dictatorship in order to compensate for the smashing of urban opposition movements had been long nurtured among the Brazilian Left since 1964, but it was left to the PCdoB to be the only political organization that actually tried to build up such a focus.

The guerrilla was countered by the Brazilian Army from 1972, when several of its members had already been established in the region for at least six years. The stage of combat operations between the guerrillas and the Army took place in the border of the states of Goiás, Pará and Maranhão. The movement's name came from the fact that its fighters were established on the banks of the Araguaia river, near the towns of São Geraldo, Pará and Xambioá, in northern Goiás (currently located in northern Tocantins, at a region popularly known as Bico do Papagaio (Parrot's Beak). (Note: The Serra dos Martírios (Martyrs' Range) where the guerrillas made their base was renamed the Serra das Andorinhas (Swallows Range) after the guerrilha ended. Today it is protected by the Serra dos Martírios/Andorinhas State Park.) The region was chosen because it consisted of a hotspot of tension between peasants and developers (miners and public works contractors) attracted by the investment opportunities offered by the recent discovery of the nearby Carajás iron ore mine. The guerrillas hoped to gain support of such tensions by siding with the peasants.

It is estimated that the movement was composed of about 80 guerrillas. Of these, fewer than twenty survived - among them José Genoino, later president of the Workers' Party, who was arrested by the Army in 1972 during the first stage of military operations. The vast majority of combatants, primarily composed of former college students and self-employed workers, were killed in battle in the jungle or executed after arrest and torture during the final stages of military operations in 1973 and 1974. However, none of the individuals were acknowledged as dead, remaining in the status of persons who had disappeared for political reasons. Currently 60 of the combatants are still considered desaparecidos.

== Summary of military operations ==
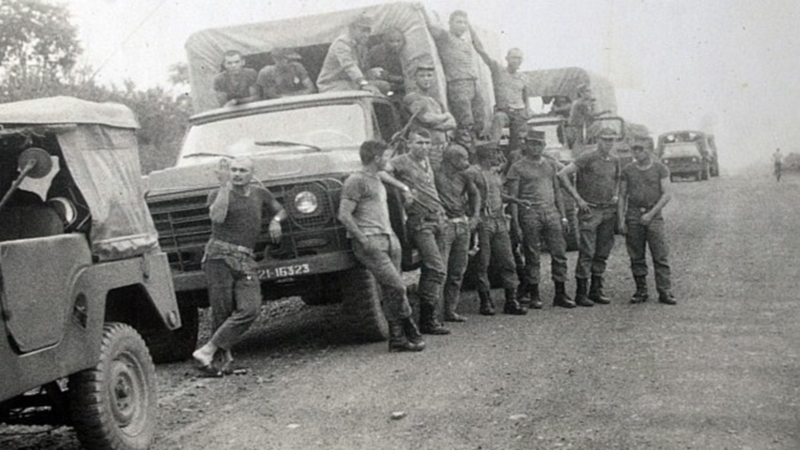
Soldiers from the Brazilian Army in the Marajoara Operation

The military intervention by the then military dictatorship to eliminate the guerrillas focus in the region, "the Araguaia guerrilla" can be divided into 4 phases:

- Operação Papagaio (Operation Parrot) - Apr./Oct. 1972; Conventional use of large regular military units in the first campaign against Araguaia guerrilla, ended with the departure of the troops due to the inefficiency of such approach. The saturation of the region by conventional troops led only to the disorganization of the force of intervention. Indecisive clashes with the guerrillas lowered morale among the military, especially amid marine units, which were therefore excused from further operations. However, this conventional operation already set a hallmark for the entire campaign in that it was waged in brutal fashion. Three areas were bombed with napalm by the military- something confirmed in a 2013 report by the National Truth Commission
- Operação Sucuri (Operation Anaconda) - Apr./Oct. 1973; aware of the inefficiency of the use of conventional war models' methods and resources against rural guerrilla warfare, and fearing that Araguaia could become in the long run a controlled or recurrently area used by guerrillas, like other regions in the globe, the military decided to change their mode of operation. Operation Anaconda was a military intelligence operation, which also used the same methods of guerrilla warfare, as for example the gradual infiltration among the civilian population of specially trained, supported and monitored agents, who had the same overall appearance of the local population- which was, at the same time, submitted to tight control of their movements and whereabouts.
- Operation Marajoara - Oct. 1973/Oct. 1974 - In this phase, with the information gathered during Operation Anaconda, about 400 operators specialized in counter-guerrilla and counter-insurgency were gradually spread out in the region, in same conditions as the agents of previous Operation Anaconda. Divided in small units, having also enlisted some locals who had previously collaborated with the guerrillas, the military proceeded to execute arrests (some 160 locals were detained) and then to search for the supply posts of the guerrillas, which were systematically destroyed, rendering the enemy fighters prone to contagium of tropical diseases such as yellow fever. This strategy of attrition succeeded to dismantle the guerrilla in Araguaia, before the movement could gain momentum. The disorganization of the guerrillas was followed by an extermination campaign, during which guerrillas were killed by the military.
- Cleansing Operation - In early 1975, with the guerrilla already wiped, the military began a concealment operation of all the facts happened in Araguaia, in the face of absolute secrecy determined by government policy of the then new president General Ernesto Geisel. The operation's goal was to erase the traces of the struggle, including the enemies' corpses left behind, buried in the forests. About 60 guerrillas had been killed, after captured.

Documents were burned, the camps dismantled and the enemies corpses taken out of their graves and burned. In the following years, surfaced records of successive masking operations in the region. Of the Brazilian military regime, Ernesto Geisel was the only president to officially talk about it, in a message to Congress on March 15, 1975, which said that there were attempts to organize "guerrilla bases on unprotected and far inland territories", and that they had been all "completely defeated".

== Aftermath ==
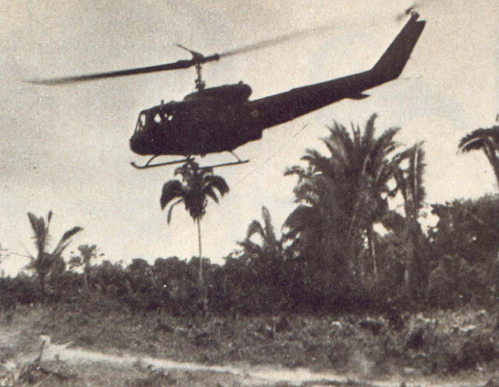
A Bell UH-1 Iroquois helicopter of the Brazilian Air Force on mission in Araguaia. This aircraft model was widely used in attack and transport missions.

When democracy was being restored, in 1982, family members of 22 of the disappeared persons brought proceedings in the Federal Court of Rio de Janeiro, asking for the whereabouts of the disappeared persons to be established and their remains located so that they could be given a decent burial and their death certificates could be registered. At first, the national courts processed the case in the usual way, requesting documents from Executive Branch officials, and summonsing witnesses. However, on March 27, 1989, after the judge responsible for the case was replaced, the Araguaia guerrilla case was dismissed without ruling on the merits, on the grounds that it was legally and physically impossible to comply with the request. Similarly, the judge considered that what the plaintiffs were requesting was covered by the Amnesty law and did not require a judicial action.

The plaintiffs appealed the decision to dismiss the case and, on August 17, 1993, obtained a ruling from the Federal Court of Appeals, which reversed the decision of the lower court, and returned the case to the same judge for finding of fact and a ruling on the merits. On March 24, 1994, the Federal Government filed requests for clarification against the Federal Court's ruling. The appeal was not heard by the Court, based on a unanimous decision of the Court of Appeals itself on March 12, 1996. The Government lodged a special appeal against this decision, which was also ruled inadmissible by the Court of Appeals.

On March 6, 2001, the plaintiffs appealed to the Inter-American Commission on Human Rights, which decided to declare the Araguaia guerrilla case admissible with regard to alleged violations of the American Declaration and the American Convention. On May 20–21, 2010, the case was heard at the Inter-American Court of Human Rights. On December 14, 2010, the Court ruled that Brazil has broken the American Convention on Human Rights by using its Amnesty law as a pretext for not punishing human rights violators of the military regime.

On April 29, 2010, the Supreme Federal Court decided, by a vote of 7 to 2, to uphold the 1979 Amnesty law, which prevents the trial of those accused of extrajudicial killings and torture during the military regime.

== Bibliography ==
- Gaspari, Elio (2002). A Ditadura Escancarada [The Dictatorship Revealed] (in Portuguese). Vol. II. As Ilusões Armadas [Armed Illusions]. Cia das Letras. ISBN 85-359-0299-6.

== See also ==
- Rebellions and revolutions in Brazil
- Brazilian Army
- Military history of Brazil
- Operation Independence
