= Maurício Grabois =

Brazilian politician killed by the Brazilian military dictatorship (1912–1973)

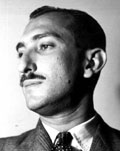
- Born: 2 October 1912; Salvador, Bahia, Brazil
- Died: 25 December 1973 (aged 61); Xambioá, Goiás, Brazil (Note: At the time, Xambioá was part of the state of Goiás, which was later divided for the creation of Tocantins.)
- Monuments: Maurício Grabois Institute
- Other names: Mário, Abel, Chico, Velho
- Education: Military School of Realengo; School of Agronomy of Rio de Janeiro
- Known for: Araguaia Guerrilla War
- Political party: PCB (1930–1962); PCdoB (1962–1973)
- Movement: Brazilian Communism

Maurício Grabois (2 October 1912 – 25 December 1973) was a Brazilian politician, founder of the modern Communist Party of Brazil and one of its leaders until his death in 1973.

== Biography ==
Maurício Grabois was born into a Jewish family in Salvador, Bahia, a city on the northeast coast of Brazil. His parents were Agustin and Dora Grabois. He graduated from the State Gymnasium of Salvador, an elementary school in his city. At the age of 19 he moved to Rio de Janeiro to study at the Military School of Realengo (which would later become the Academia Militar de Agulhas Negras). There he became a Marxist-Leninist and spread communism in the military college.

== Activism ==
In Rio de Janeiro, Grabois joined the Communist Youth of Brazil and at the age of twenty-two became its leader. After joining the National Liberation Alliance (Aliança Nacional Libertadora), an organization which gathered anti-fascist military officers he became one of the leaders of the unsuccessful Communist uprising of November, 1935 in Rio de Janeiro, Natal, and Recife.

After the failed uprising, he became the editor of an underground Communist newspaper, A Classe Operária (the Working Class). He was arrested in 1941 and released the following year. The overthrow of Getúlio Vargas resulted in the legalization of Communist organizations of Brazil. In 1945 Maurício Grabois was elected federal congressman and became a member of the Foreign Relations Committee of Brazil.

== Death ==
After the Brazilian coup d'état of 1964, Grabois became a proponent of armed struggle to overthrow the military regime. In 1966 the Communist Party of Brazil decided that urban guerrilla warfare tactics were necessary to establish a Communist regime in Brazil. In 1967 Grabois started recruiting guerilla combatants in Pará and after a series of clashes with government forces, Grabois had disappeared and later was revealed to have been killed in 1973. Contemporary reports claim he was executed by Major Sebastião Curió; a military report places the date of his death at December 25. His death has yet to be officially recognized by the government.

== See also ==
- List of solved missing person cases
