= Xandoca's Revolt =

Xandoca's Revolt was a conflict among rival oligarchs for control of the government of Espírito Santo, Brazil, from 26 May to 29 June 1916. Professor Alexandre Calmon, known as "Xandoca” established a parallel government in Colatina, in the interior of the state, contesting the election of Bernardino de Sousa Monteiro, successor to the state president Marcondes de Souza. The opposition was aligned with President Venceslau Brás, while the governing faction was associated with Francisco Sales, both prominent political leaders from Minas Gerais. Each municipality became divided between opposition and government supporters, and the police forces loyal to Marcondes de Souza confronted Calmon's armed supporters, resulting in at least twenty-two deaths. The crisis was debated in the National Congress, where the leader of the largest bloc, Antônio Carlos de Andrada, a member of the Mineiro Republican Party aligned with Sales, secured an outcome favorable to the Monteiro's faction. Those involved were subsequently granted amnesty. The Sousa Monteiro oligarchy remained the most influential political force in Vitória until the Revolution of 1930.
