= João Amazonas =

Brazilian theoretician, revolutionary, guerrilla member, and politician (1912–2002)

- Amazonas in 1957

Federal Deputy
- In office February 5, 1946 – January 10, 1947
- Constituency: Federal District

Personal details
- Born: João Amazonas de Souza Pedros; January 1, 1912 Belém, Pará, Brazil
- Died: May 27, 2002 (aged 90) São Paulo, Brazil
- Party: PCB (1935–1962); PCdoB (1962–2002)
- Occupation: Politician, guerrilla member

João Amazonas de Souza Pedroso (January 1, 1912 – May 27, 2002) was a Brazilian Marxist theoretician, revolutionary, guerrilla member and leader of the Communist Party of Brazil. He was born on January 1, 1912, in the Paraense capital, Belém, and died in São Paulo on May 27, 2002. Amazonas was national president of PCdoB from 1962 to 2001.

== Affiliation with the Communist Party ==
João Amazonas' involvement with the communist movement began in 1935, at age 23, when he learned of a rally of the National Liberating Alliance (ANL) at Largo da Pólvora square and joined the ANL. Invited to join the Communist Youth, he subsequently also joined the then–Communist Party of Brazil (PCB).

Soon after joining the Communist Party, João Amazonas organized a communist cell at the company where he worked and organized the union for his category. In the same year he began his political participation, he was arrested for 15 days for involvement with the Union of Proletarians of Belém.

In early 1936, João Amazonas was again arrested for being a former member of the ANL. During imprisonment, João Amazonas and Pedro Pomar staged a hunger strike against the terrible conditions and taught Marxist-Leninist classes to the other detainees. In June 1937, João Amazonas was acquitted for lack of evidence after a year and a half in prison.

== Reorganization of the Communist Party ==
With Getúlio Vargas's coup d'état, justified by the fake Cohen Plan and which established the Estado Novo regime, repression of communists increased. On September 10, 1940, João Amazonas, who was working on propaganda production and held a leadership position in the Communist Party of Brazil in Pará, was arrested again.

After his release, he dedicated his life to the legacy of the communist struggle. In 1943 he was elected a member of the Central Committee of the Communist Party of Brazil, joining the executive commission and secretariat, and in 1945 he was elected constituent federal deputy, receiving the highest vote total in the Federal District with 18,379 votes. His mandate was terminated on January 10, 1948, under Law No. 211 of January 7, 1948, due to the cancellation of the Communist Party of Brazil's (PCB) registration.

João Amazonas opposed the changes that occurred within the party after the 20th Congress of the Communist Party of the Soviet Union, which is why in 1957 he was removed from the executive commission and, at the end of 1961, he was expelled from the party along with other militants. The expelled members decided to reorganize the party, break with the reformist line, and adopted the name PCdoB, approving a programmatic manifesto in which they reaffirmed revolutionary theses and Marxist–Leninist principles.

He participated several times in congresses at colleges and educational institutions. He was secretary-general of the PCdoB for a long period and, between 1968 and 1972, actively participated in the Araguaia Guerrilla, which aimed to establish a dictatorship of the proletariat along Soviet and Chinese models.

Together with names such as José Dirceu, Olívio Dutra, and José Paulo Bisol, he managed to articulate the Brazil Popular Front (FBP) in the 1989 presidential elections, which secured Luiz Inácio Lula da Silva's candidacy for the presidency.

== Death ==
João Amazonas died at the age of ninety from respiratory failure, after spending six days in the intensive care unit (ICU) of the Nove de Julho Hospital in São Paulo. His body was laid to rest in the Legislative Assembly of São Paulo (ALESP) and was cremated at the Vila Alpina crematorium.

Then-president Fernando Henrique Cardoso mourned Amazonas's death through his spokesperson, Alexandre Parola, calling him "a man who fought (...) for his ideals and left his mark on popular struggles." Members of the Workers' Party (PT), such as Paul Singer and Antonio Palocci, also mourned the death of the communist leader.

== Works ==
An organic intellectual, João produced the following works:

- Chinese Revisionism of Mao Tsetung, Anita Garibaldi Publisher, 1981.
- For Freedom and Popular Democracy, Anita Garibaldi Publisher, 1982.
- Socialism: Ideal of the Working Class, Aspiration of All Peoples, Anita Garibaldi Publisher, 1983.
- 30 Years of Ideological Confrontation: Marxism vs. Revisionism, Anita Garibaldi Publisher, 1990.
- Epic for Freedom: Araguaia Guerrilla, 30 Years (1972-2002), Anita Garibaldi Publisher, 1992

== See also ==
- Araguaia Guerrilla War
- Communism in Brazil
- Carlos Marighella
- Luis Carlos Prestes
