= Frente de Libertação do Nordeste =

The Northeast Liberation Front (Portuguese: Frente de Libertação do Nordeste, FLNE or FLNe) was a Brazilian revolutionary group established in 1971 in Pernambuco and Ceará, uniting ex-members of the Aliança Libertadora Nacional (ALN) and the Vanguarda Armada Revolucionária Palmares (VAR-Palmares).
