= Jefferson Cardim de Alencar Osorio =

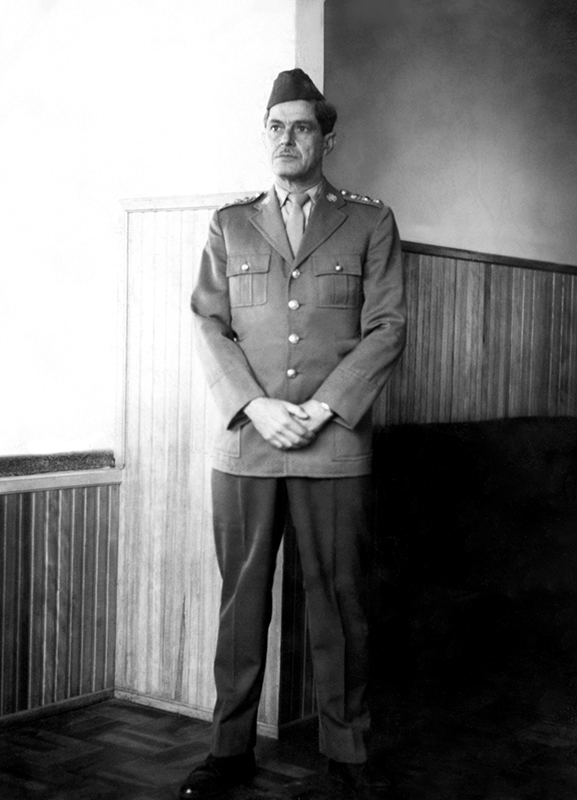
Colonel Jefferson Cardim in 1964.

Jefferson Cardim de Alencar Osório (17 January 1912 – 1995) was a Brazilian Army officer. He reached the rank of colonel and was purged from the army by AI-1 in the 1964 Brazilian coup d'état.

== Early life ==
He was the son of Brazilian Navy officer Roberto de Alencar Osório (born Robert Ernest Hoomenark) and Corina Cardim de Alencar Osório.

== Career ==
His political beliefs led to his oppression by his military superiors. One of his worst persecutors, Ernesto Geisel, eventually became the fourth general dictator of the Brazilian military government from 1974 to 1979.

Cardim was the initiator of the first armed response to the military regime, an episode known as the Três Passos guerrilla. He is considered to be one of the first victims, if not the first, of the joint repression made by two South American countries during the 1970s that would later be known as Operation Condor.

=== Três Passos Guerrilla ===
After he was kicked out of the Army, Cardim was determined to give a proper military response to the new government, before the coup could begin. He met Leonel Brizola in Uruguay, while trying to find support for a military action that would destabilize the government. He set his hopes on a network of Brizola supporters who would show him solidarity when his insurgency launched.

In Uruguay, he managed to find another army that supported his ideas. He brought some weapons and later entered Brazil with his comrades near the border cities of Rivera and Santana do Livramento. His plan was to visit several cities and military offices in the south of Brazil and inspire the population to revolt against the new government, overthrowing Castello Branco.

His first military action took place in the city of Três Passos in the northeast region of the Rio Grande do Sul state, together with 20 supporters he found along the way. On March 26, 1965, he took a military police barrack and invaded a local radio station, where a manifesto was read with live radio broadcasting.

Later, he headed to the North where he would encounter an army of 5001 men assigned to stop him.

Another confrontation occurred the next day, near the town of Medianeira at Parana state, where his group surrendered. He was tortured and imprisoned, accused of killing a sergeant during the confrontation in Mediadora. In 1968, he escaped from the prison with his 15-year-old son and became a political refugee, first in Mexico and later in Algeria.

=== Arrest and Extradition ===
With an Algerian passport, he started to live in Uruguay together with his Uruguayan wife. During an international conference, he presented to Salvador Allende, who, after being elected president of Chile, invited him to participate in his government.

Cardim accepted the offer and left Montevideo by car, heading to Chile with his son, who was then 18 and an Uruguayan nephew aged 20. On December 11, 1970, he landed in Argentina, after crossing the Uruguay–Argentina border in a ferry. He was arrested and imprisoned on a false drug trafficking accusation.

The operation was monitored by the Brazilian military attaché in Buenos Aires, Colonel Nile Caneppa da Silva. The three travellers were arrested by the Argentina Federal Police and remained incommunicado at police headquarters. They were interrogated and tortured, while the police were seeking opponents of Peron or Tupamaros guerrilla combatants. Two days later, the Uruguayan nephew was released, but Cardim and his son were returned to Brazil in an aircraft serving a Brazilian minister.

One of the flight members recognized Cardim and called his mother before getting on the plane, informing her that he is returning to Brazil. Some believe that this call prevented his "disappearance" on his way back to Brazil. On arrival in Brazil, he continued to be tortured along with his son, who was released on January 20, 1971. Cardim remained in prison until November 2, 1977.
