= Military Police of Minas Gerais State =

Brazilian state police

Minas Gerais Military Police Polícia Militar de Minas Gerais
- Abbreviation: PMMG
- Motto: "Our duty, your life" Nossa profissão, sua vida

Agency overview
- Formed: June 9, 1775

Jurisdictional structure
- Operations jurisdiction: Minas Gerais, Brazil
- Map of Minas Gerais Military Police's jurisdiction
- General nature: Gendarmerie

Operational structure
- Headquarters: Belo Horizonte

Website
- Polícia Militar de Minas Gerais

The Polícia Militar de Minas Gerais (PMMG; "Minas Gerais Military Police") is a military law-enforcement organization in the state of Minas Gerais, Brazil. It is both the oldest and the second largest state police force in all of Brazil, with approximately 48,000 officers under its command. As a gendarmerie, its duties largely consist of preventing crime and patrolling both the towns and countryside of Minas Gerais.

Originally formed in 1775 entirely from local volunteers, the force would eventually integrate military discipline and training while also adjusting its methods and organization to match changes in Brazilian law. A storied unit, the PMMG has counted several notable Brazilians in its ranks over the years.

== Mission and organization ==
The PMMG's primary mission is to deter and control crime throughout the state, often by patrolling streets or public facilities in cities, such as schools. However, it is also responsible for monitoring the open lands, forests, rivers, and highways of Minas Gerais, and will even carry out reconnaissance missions, referred to as P2.

The force is divided evenly between Belo Horizonte, the capital of Minas Gerais, and the remaining cities and districts. The PMMG's administrative structure consists of 15 regions, subdivided into large battalions down to individual detachments, which always consist of a minimum of 4 officers to a county.

== History ==
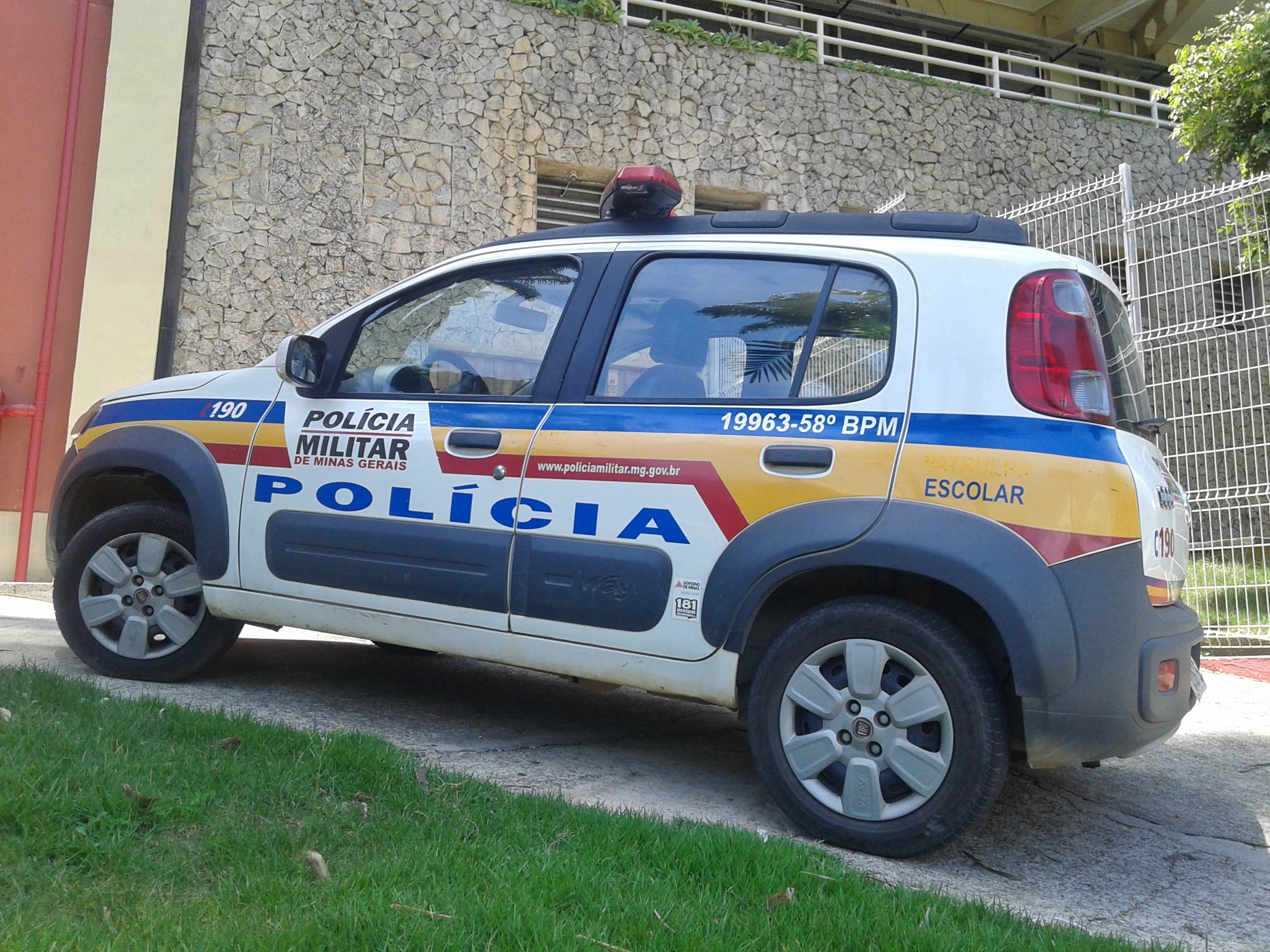
PMMG car in Coronel Fabriciano, Vale do Aço.

Towards the end of the seventeenth century, gold was discovered in Minas Gerais, and as miners began finding other ores and gems, waves of migrants from all over Brazil began a gold rush to the state. Within the chaotic mass of newcomers, violence and disorder became prevalent enough to worry colonial Portuguese authorities. At least as concerned about collecting taxes on the newfound mineral wealth as stopping the lawlessness, Governor Pedro Miguel de Almeida requested two companies of Portuguese dragoons from the King of Portugal.

However, discipline rapidly broke down among the Portuguese soldiers, and many deserted to become prospectors themselves. The people of Minas Gerais wanted a capable and loyal force to maintain order and punish wrongdoers, but not a heavy-handed unit focused on imposing Portuguese regulations. As a result, on June 9, 1775 the governor, Don Antonio de Noronha, would officially disband the Portuguese dragoons and replace them with the Regular Cavalry Regiment of Mines.

This new police force consisted entirely of Minas Gerais locals, or mineiros, who would be more passionate about protecting their own neighbors and lands. These new officers would also receive regular salaries from the treasury, in order to discourage taking bribes or deserting to pan and mine for gold. From the beginning of its existence, the regiment would engage in both normal police actions, like catching criminals, and military actions like putting down insurrections. Despite this, the regiment would not develop more military characteristics until after Brazilian Independence and the establishment of the Republic. With the help of Robert Drexler, a military advisor and colonel in the Swiss Army, the force would begin receiving full military training.

In the years since, legal and political changes have adjusted the powers and resources of the PMMG. Decree-Law 667 and its later amendments would give the PMMG the constitutional obligation to maintain the public peace, along with the power to independently plan and carry out civilian policing. The concept of "police authority" was also interpreted as substantially different from previous practice. In 1988, the Constituents of the Republic established a Public Safety System consisting of law enforcement agencies. By Article 144 of the Constitution, each agency retained its independence and structure, but with both more cooperation and checks on power. This reform was intended to help all agencies better fight crime while protecting citizens from abuses and rights violations.

== Special and elite forces ==
- ROTAM (Rondas Ostensivas Táticas Metropolitanas - Metropolitan Ostensive Tactics Patrol)
- Tático Móvel (Mobile Tactical Police)
- ROCCA (Rondas Ostensivas Com Cães - Ostensive Patrol With Dogs)
- GEPAR (Grupo Especializado de Policiamento em Áreas de Risco - Specialized Policing Group in Risk Areas);
- CHOQUE (Batalhão de Polícia de Eventos - Riot Police Battalion);
- BOPE (Batalhão de Operações Policiais Especiais - Battalion of Special Police Operations).

== Notable former officers ==
Brazilian former president Juscelino Kubitschek (1902–1976) was a medical doctor and commissioned as a captain in the PMMG.

The famed writer Guimarães Rosa (1908–1967) also served as a volunteer medical doctor in the PMMG, but he never held military rank.

The hero of the troop, Fulgêncio de Sousa Santos (1896–1932), also served in the PMMG, reaching the rank of colonel.
