= Serra do Caparaó =

Mountain range in Brazil

Coordinates: 20.4195597°S 41.8433836°W

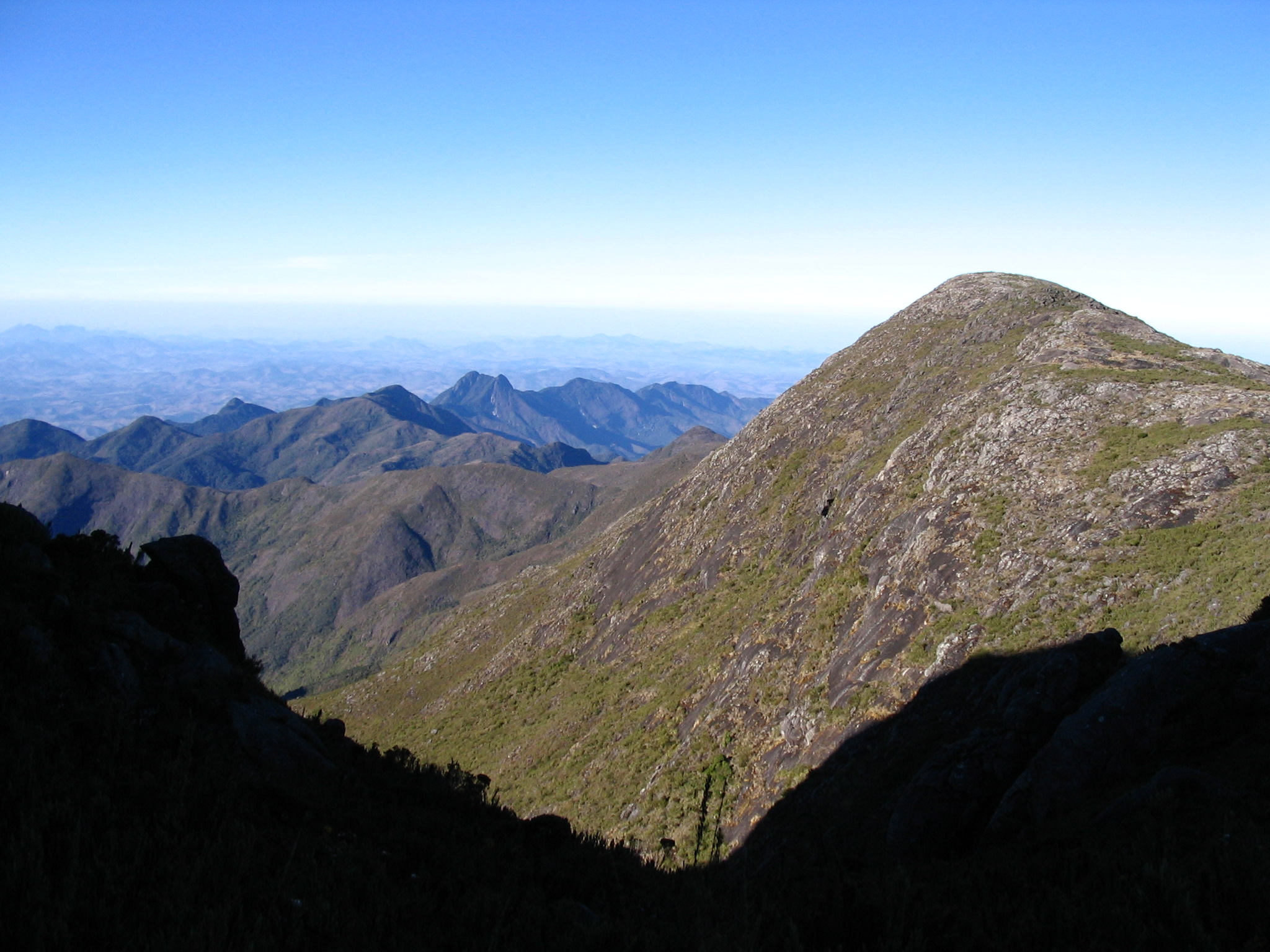
View of Serra do Caparaó, with Pico do Calçado in evidence. In the background can be seen the Serra dos Órgãos mountain range, distant almost 400 km.

Serra do Caparaó is a Brazilian mountain range located between the states of Espírito Santo and Minas Gerais.

== Toponym ==
"Caparaó" is a tupi word, the etymology of which is unclear: it may come from capara-oca (house made with capara, a twisted shrub) or from caá-apara-ó (trench made of twisted shrubs).

== Geography ==
Pico da Bandeira (2892 m) is the highest point in the region. Other peaks also worth mentioning are: Pico do Calçado ("Shoe Peak", 2849 m), Pico do Cristal ("Crystal Peak", 2770 m) and Morro da Cruz do Negro ("Blackman's Cross Mountain", 2658 m).

The region is place for Brazil's second largest altitude, after Serra do Imeri, and the largest gap or prominence (997 m).

The Caparaó Mountains are mostly covered with Atlantic Forest, the preservation of which was guaranteed with the creation in May 1961 of the Caparaó National Park.

== Climate ==
The lowest temperatures of both neighbouring states occur in this region; in Winter, frost occurs almost daily and the average low is −5 °C at Pico da Bandeira, dropping as low as −10 °C.

== History ==
In the years 1966–67, the region was the hiding place for the left-wing guerrilla group Guerrilha do Caparaó, who fought the Brazilian military government.
