= Tiradentes Revolutionary Movement (1969–1971) =

Armed struggle organization against the Military dictatorship in Brazil

- Some of MRT's prominent militants, killed and disappeared during the military dictatorship. From left to right, clockwise: Devanir José de Carvalho, Joaquim Alencar de Seixas, Dimas Antônio Casemiro, Aderval Alves Coqueiro.
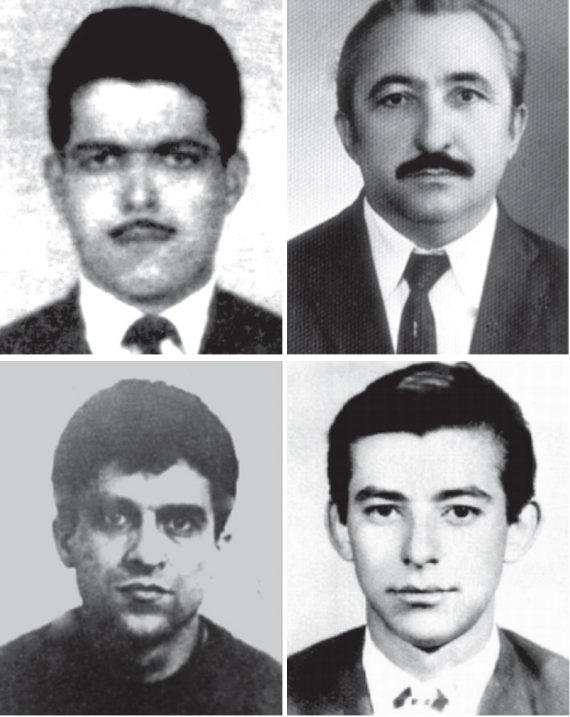
- Founded: 1969
- Dissolved: 1971
- Country: Brazil
- Ideology: Marxism-Leninism; Castroism; Anti-imperialism
- Political position: Far-left
- Status: Dismantled by repression in 1971

The Tiradentes Revolutionary Movement (MRT) was an organization that was active in the armed struggle against the Brazilian military dictatorship and existed between September 1969 and April 1971. During this period, it was responsible for a series of guerrilla actions that sought to destabilize the regime while reorganizing the working class to bring about a socialist revolution. Unlike the majority of guerrilla organizations of that period, formed mostly by students, the MRT had almost exclusively worker members in its composition.

The organization was formed from a meeting in Campos do Jordão, gathering the group that orbited around Devanir José de Carvalho and Plínio Petersen Pereira, former members of the Communist Party of Brazil Red Wing (PCdoB-AV). It was baptized as the Tiradentes Revolutionary Movement in honor of the group of the same name, linked to the Peasant Leagues, which operated between 1961 and 1962, as well as to confuse the repression. Acting in a period in which other organizations of the armed left went through difficulties, MRT tried to articulate itself with other revolutionary groups, such as Ação Libertadora Nacional (ALN) and Vanguarda Popular Revolucionária (VPR), to carry out actions of expropriation, sabotage, and propaganda.

Among its main actions were the assault on an armored car of the Brink's cash transportation company, considered one of the most profitable actions of the armed struggle in Brazil, and the murder of the businessman Henning Albert Boilesen, in reprisal for the murder of Devanir de Carvalho, when the organization was already very weakened. The MRT was dismantled by repression in April 1971, after a series of arrests of ex-militants, whose information extracted by repression, led to a domino effect that led the group to close its activities.

== History ==
=== Foundation ===
The Tiradentes Revolutionary Movement was founded by ex-militants of the Red Wing. The Red Wing, which emerged as a dissidence of the Communist Party of Brazil (PCdoB), had opted for the strategy of armed struggle in 1967, and in the following year carried out expropriations, which in principle were to take place only in the urban center of São Paulo and were to be used to finance the implantation of a revolutionary focus in the rural areas, with the objective of creating the conditions for a prolonged popular war. These actions were carried out by the National Special Group (GEN), the armed arm of the organization However, the Red Wing's leadership began to reevaluate these actions, and became critical of the guerrilla actions exclusively in the urban center of São Paulo, and disallowed new ventures by GEN. This position displeased some of the Wing militants, especially those who were part of the GEN.

In mid-1969, a meeting took place between members of the Red Wing's leadership, Derly José de Carvalho and Élio Cabral de Souza, with members of GEN, Aderval Alves Coqueiro, Devanir José de Carvalho, and a militant codenamed "Roberto". In this meeting, the members of GEN proposed the intensification of armed actions, which was not accepted by the members of the leadership, who announced that they intended to dissolve the group and integrate them into the political work with the popular classes. Not accepting the agreement, and faced with the refusal of their proposals, the GEN militants declared themselves estranged from the Red Wing, even though they did not definitively break with the organization. The dissidents made the GEN independent from the Red Wing national leadership and began to act as the Revolutionary National Special Group (GENR), acting without the authorization of the Wing's leaders. In response, the Red Wing dissolved the GEN, and established that armed actions in urban centers should only have political and fundraising aspects. No other branch of the Wing would be created to engage in these actions, which would be put into practice by militants determined by the organization's leadership. GENR, however, continued to carry out actions in the absence of the Red Wing, carrying out, in May 1969, an assault on the National Credit Bank, installed inside Mercedes-Benz, accused of financing the government's torture and repression organs. In April of the same year, the group carried out the expropriation of a van of valuables of the French and Italian Bank, after an intense exchange of fire that led to the death of Francisco Bento da Silva, employee of a bank security company, and Luiz Pereira da Silva, bank employee. Also in April, the organization carried out an attack on the Jurema bus company in response to the increase in public transportation fares.

Because of its armed actions, the Red Wing was strongly repressed by the military. The organization, understanding that the armed actions in the cities proved ineffective in their objectives of motivating the urban proletariat to rise up and to establish a real guerrilla warfare in the rural areas, started to change tactics, aiming at the education, preparation and organization of the popular classes for political and armed struggle. Those militants that sought to engage in more immediate revolutionary actions left the Red Wing after this change. Some of them joined the National Liberation Action (ALN), while the others, aggregated around the leaderships of Devanir José de Carvalho and Plínio Petersen Pereira, founded the Tiradentes Revolutionary Movement (MRT).

In September 1969, a meeting took place in Campos do Jordão, in the interior of São Paulo, attended by the groups aggregated around Devanir de Carvalho and Plínio Petersen, representatives of the Palmares Armed Revolutionary Vanguard (VAR-Palmares), the Communist Workers Party (POC), and the Democratic Network (REDE). After the initial discussions, the political lines of each organization seemed to be well defined, and the militants who attended the meeting were free to make the decision they liked best, and could choose to join any of the groupings represented there. Thus Devanir de Carvalho, Plínio Petersen, Waldemar Andrew, Armênio de Souza Rangel, Nelson Ferreira, João Moraes, Antônio André Camargo Guerra, Jorge Kurban Abraão, and other members of GENR decided to join a new grouping that resulted from that meeting, which was to be baptized as Tiradentes Revolutionary Movement (MRT). The others present decided to join the VAR-Palmares.

It was only a few days after this meeting that the organization was baptized. The choice of the name "Tiradentes Revolutionary Movement" alluded to the Red Wing's earliest origins, whose most prominent founding members, such as Diniz Cabral Filho, Élio Cabral de Souza, and Tarzan de Castro, were part of the movement of the same name linked to the Peasant Leagues. This name was also chosen to confuse the repression, in order to make the repressive organs think that it was in fact the organization that had acted in the beginning of the 1960s. In the same way, for the general public, the presence of MRT's actions, an acronym given as debunked by repression, could demoralize the military government, just as the militants of the Communist Dissidence of Guanabara (DI-GB) did when they assumed the acronym of the 8th October Revolutionary Movement (MR-8), another organization given as defeated by repression.

=== First actions ===
From the beginning, MRT sought to carry out as many armed actions as possible in the metropolitan region of São Paulo. For this, it sought to articulate with other leftist guerrilla organizations. Soon after the meeting in which MRT was founded, the militants decided to carry out an expropriation in a supermarket on Santo Amaro Avenue, together with REDE, but that ended up not happening because a Radio Patrol car intercepted the group formed by Devanir, Armênio, Waldemar and REDE militants, there was an exchange of fire and the death of a soldier.

Some time later, MRT carried out, together with REDE, an assault on an armored car of the National Institute of Social Security (INPS), an action in which an INPS employee was killed. Another expropriation together with REDE was carried out on September 8, at the Light agency, in the Belém district of São Paulo, commanded by Devanir de Carvalho and Eduardo Collen Leite. Also participating in this action were militants Gilberto Faria Lima, James Allen da Luz, Geraldo Virgílio Godoy and another identified only as Ismael.

In late 1969, after the successful kidnapping of U.S. ambassador Charles Burke Elbrick, repression fell even harder on the armed groups of the revolutionary left. Carlos Marighella, the main leader of the ANL, was assassinated, and several militants fell victim to the repression. The revolutionary organizations decided to create a front to articulate the armed actions among themselves, adding efforts and seeking unity, although without proposing a fusion into a single, large organization. MRT, ALN, VPR, POC and REDE participated in a meeting in December 1969 for the creation of a revolutionary armed front. Devanir de Carvalho, leader of the MRT, had an important role in the construction of this front. In the meeting a document entitled "Project of Declaration" was elaborated, with seven points that the organizations agreed upon to guarantee the objective of contributing to a "workers' revolution in Brazil", like a greater articulation among the actions of these revolutionary organizations; the realization of systematic meetings with one or two representatives of each of the groupings that composed the front; the decision that if the realization of the actions, the way and the participation of each organization were unanimously decided by the signatories, the action could be signed in the name of the front; The technical knowledge of the actions would be restricted to the participants of the preparatory meetings; the organizations should support each other logistically and financially; the organizations that made up the front would recognize each other as revolutionary organizations and the front would be open to other organizations that accepted such terms; and, finally, besides the systematic meetings and joint actions, the need to develop ideological discussions among the militants was recognized, by means of documents and within the norms of mutual respect. It was decided that Devanir de Carvalho and Plínio Petersen would be responsible for representing the MRT on this front.

=== Assaults, leafleting and sabotage ===
Right at the meeting that formed the armed front, a simultaneous expropriation of two banks located on Brigadeiro Luís Antônio Avenue was agreed upon. The action took place on December 29, 1969, in a joint action in which the militants robbed both the Banco Mercantil de São Paulo e o Banco Itaú. Devanir de Carvalho, Plinio Petersen and Waldemar Andrew participated in the action for MRT. The expropriated money remained with Guiomar Lopes, and was later shared among ALN, MRT and REDE. This action also had a symbolic character, since the guerrilla organizations intended to resume significant actions that would demonstrate their strength and organization after Marighella's assassination.

After that, a series of other actions articulated by the front occurred in São Paulo. These actions, for the most part, were aimed at raising funds to guarantee the maintenance of the guerrilla organizations and to enable their establishment in the countryside, to establish a rural guerrilla war.

In the beginning of May 1970, another action was taken, this time against Souza Cruz cigarette company, located at Lins Vasconcelos Avenue, in an action coordinated by Eduardo Leite, for REDE; Devanir de Carvalho, Antônio Guerra, Plínio Petersen, Waldermar Andrew and José Rodrigues Ângelo Junior, for MRT; and Fernando Sanna Pinto and Jayme de Almeida for the Revolutionary Marxist Movement (MRM), organization that started to act very close to MRT. At the end of the month there was a robbery at Banco do Brasil, in Jabaquara, in which there was an intense exchange of fire that resulted in casualties between the bank security guards and an ALN militant. Devanir de Carvalho and Antônio Guerra participated in the action.

On September 7, Independence Day, a propaganda action was planned to hurt the image built by the military dictatorship around the date. On that day, there was a leafleting with Yoshitane Fujimori, Ubiratan de Souza, José Raimundo da Costa and Delci Fensterseifer from the VPR; and Devanir de Carvalho, Joaquim Alencar de Seixas, who had joined the MRT in mid-1970, and another unidentified militant, also from the MRT. The pamphlets contained a text entitled "For a real independence", being signed by the MRT, ALN and VPR, whose content was the following:

The true independence of Brazil is still to come. First it was the Portuguese who were in charge here, then the English. Now the Americans are giving the orders. Tiradentes was killed and quartered because he fought for the independence of Brazil. Today the armed forces, instructed by the Americans, torture and kill those who fight for the Brazilian people and for the true independence of Brazil, like the worker Olavo Hansen, the student Edson Luís, Father Henrique Pereira, Sergeant Manoel Raimundo Soares, the patriot Carlos Marighella. The true independence of Brazil will only be achieved by the people in arms, expelling the Americans and establishing a regime that ends the hunger of the workers and the exploitation of the Brazilians. In the vote, in conversation or in shouting, it will not happen.

— "For a real independence". Pamphlet signed by the armed front, September 7, 1970.

Still in September, MRT participated in another action of the front, which produced a financial result smaller only than the assault on Adhemar de Barros' safe. On the 15th of that month, militants from ALN, MRT and VPR intercepted an armored car belonging to the Brink's cash-in-transit company, surrendering the staff of the transporting car and collecting around 460 thousand Brazilian cruzeiros. Antônio Guerra, Devanir de Carvalho, Joaquim Alencar de Seixas and José Rodrigues Ângelo Junior, of the MRT; Yoshitane Fujimore, Gregório Mendonça and José Maria Ferreira Araújo, of the VPR; and José Milton Barbosa and Carlos Eugênio Paz, of the ANL, were said to have participated in the action. The success of this expropriation encouraged new actions of this kind, but the two following attacks on Brink's cars failed. In one of them, in the Paraíso neighborhood, on December 14, the garrison retaliated and the shooting resulted in the death of one of the guards. From this frustrated assault, Devanir de Carvalho, Joaquim Alencar Seixas, Antônio Guerra, Gilberto Faria Lima and Dimas Antônio Casemiro participated in their first action for the MRT.

Still in 1970, the MRT sheltered in its "apparatus" the guerrilla Carlos Lamarca. When Lamarca left Vale do Ribeira, in the region of Registro, in the south of the state of São Paulo, where the VPR was setting up a guerrilla training scheme that was discovered by the repression, he was promptly received by the MRT leader Devanir de Carvalho. He then proceeded to Joaquim Alencar de Seixas' "apparatus", where discussions took place about the guerrilla and sabotage actions to be carried out, in addition to the production of documents and manifestos for the pamphlet actions. At the end of November, Lamarca was escorted by MRT cars towards the capital of Rio de Janeiro, where he was to command the kidnapping of the Swiss ambassador Giovanni Enrico Bucher.

During January 1971, MRT participated in another series of armed actions. Another attack on a armored car was carried out, but on that occasion the paying vehicle ended up breaking the siege made by the militants. Another action was carried out by MRT together with ALN, this time an assault on the van of Andrade Arnoud Bank, on Lavapés Street, in São Paulo, in which checks, a rifle and two revolvers were expropriated. Most of the militants who participated in this action were from the MRT: Antônio Guerra, Devanir de Carvalho, Dimas Casemiro, Gilberto Faria Lima and José Rodrigues Ângelo Junior. From the ALN, Carlos Eugênio Paz, Gregório Mendonça, Antônio Sérgio de Mattos and José Milton Barbosa participated. MRT also participated in three supermarket robberies during the month. The Pão de Açúcar supermarket on São Gabriel Street was the target of two robberies in a one-week interval. Guerra, Devanir, Casemiro, Joaquim Alencar Seixas and his son Ivan Seixas, who had recently joined the MRT; Fernando Sanna Pinto and Job Alves dos Santos, for the Revolutionary Working Class Party (OPCOR), the new nickname adopted by the former MRM; and Carlos Eugenio Paz, José Milton Barbosa, and Antônio Sérgio de Mattos, from the ALN, were said to have participated in these two robberies. The other robbery was carried out at the end of the month, at the Peg-Pag supermarket, in an action coordinated by Devanir de Carvalho.

In February the MRT took part in an expropriation carried out in Metalúrgica Mangels, then on Presidente Wilson Avenue, in the capital city of São Paulo, yielding around 270 thousand Brazilian cruzeiros and armaments belonging to the site's security. Later, an action was carried out against a firm of typographic machines, located on Vergueiro Street, when offset-type machines, accessories and some money were expropriated. This action was carried out exclusively by MRT militants, however these instruments would be used for the production of pamphlets for the entire front.

In March, a report from the Department of Political and Social Order (DOPS) reported an assault on a jewelry store on Amália de Noronha Street, in Sumaré, São Paulo, which was allegedly carried out by militants from the MRT, MR-8 and ALN, on the 29th. On the 30th, on the eve of the seventh anniversary of the military coup of 1964, the front tried to carry out a sabotage action, whose objective was to blow up the Jaguaré Bridge, over the Pinheiros River, in the São Paulo capital. The militants of MRT, MR-8 and ALN dynamited the bridge with homemade explosives and closed the traffic in both directions, even shooting a bus of the company Viação Nacional. At the site, the militants left lit oil cans and "plenty of subversive propaganda material."

The group also launched, in 1971, the newspaper Voz Guerrilheira, described as its official organ. The periodical circulated clandestinely and sought to disseminate MRT's ideological conceptions and political projects. Dimas Casemiro was responsible for the periodical, which had only two editions.

=== Kidnappings ===
MRT also planned, together with the front, some kidnappings, of which at least one was successful: that of Nobuo Okushi, Japanese consul in São Paulo, one of the main actions of the front in which MRT took part. This action contributed to the consolidation of a solidarity network among the guerrilla organizations that were articulating in the beginning of 1970.

Okushi's kidnapping was planned when Chizuo Osava, known as "Mario Japa" and one of the leaders of the VPR, was captured by government repression in early March 1970. On that occasion, Osava allegedly crashed the car he was driving, and was left unconscious. A traffic cop who was on the scene went to help him and found weapons, ammunition, and organization documents in the car. The guard then called the police, and Osava fell into the hands of Sergio Fleury's torture team. If Osava did not resist the torture, the risk of the VPR being disbanded was great. Thus, the militants articulated at the front began to plan a kidnapping to free Osava, deciding on the Japanese consul. The idea of kidnapping Nobuo Okushi was initially suggested in a joking tone, when the VPR militant José Raimundo da Costa proposed to exchange "one Japanese for another". As such action would have a certain impact, both internationally and among the Japanese community in the city of São Paulo, the militants decided to carry it out. Besides Osava, the militants asked for the freedom of Damaris Lucena, widow of Antônio Raymundo Lucena, a worker who had been murdered by repression, on February 20 of that year, both from the VPR, along with their three children; Otávio Ângelo, from the ANL; Diógenes Carvalho, from the VPR; and the nun Maurina Borges da Silveira, who had been arrested for lending a room to militants from the Armed Forces for National Liberation (FALN), from Ribeirão Preto.

Ladislau Dowbor of the VPR, Devanir de Carvalho of the MRT, and Eduardo Leite of REDE were responsible for the capture of the Japanese diplomat. Dowbor commanded the action, which took place on March 11. Devanir de Carvalho, of the MRT, blocked the street with his car during the kidnapping, while Eduardo Leite led the consul to his "apparatus", in which Okushi was confined during negotiations. Four days later, the military released the political prisoners, sending them to Mexico and conferring a victory to the guerrillas.

The MRT planned another kidnapping in 1970, this time unsuccessful. In November, Eduardo Leite, who by then had joined the ANL, fell into the hands of repression and was put under torture. The ALN and MRT sought to carry out a kidnapping to free Leite and other political prisoners. The chosen one was the commander of the II Army. The action was to take place when the commander was to enter a church on Joaquim Távora Street, in São Paulo. However, as soon as the militants captured him, army vans arrived on the scene. Faced with the inevitability of conflict between the guerrillas and the army forces, the commander himself started negotiations, to avoid casualties on both sides. The militants released the commander and left the site, without exchanging fire with the Army. The action ended without any militants being victimized by the repression, but there was no success in capturing the II Army commander and guaranteeing Eduardo Leite's freedom.

Reports state that there was also a plan by the front to carry out a multiple kidnapping to free all political prisoners in the country. The MRT and MR-8, however, argued that the plan would be carried out with precarious material resources, and would clash with the likely hardening of the government, resulting in greater repression. The ANL followed the same position. In fact, the armed left had been suffering several casualties that would make it impossible to carry out the plan. Originally, three consecutive kidnappings were planned, in São Paulo, Rio de Janeiro, and the Northeast, with the intention of freeing two hundred political prisoners. However, militants from the Revolutionary Brazilian Communist Party (PCBR) were arrested in the Northeast, making any action in that region impossible, and shortly before, Joaquim Câmara Ferreira, the ANL leader who had taken Marighella's place, was killed by repression. Isolated, the VPR decided to carry out on its own the kidnapping of Swiss diplomat Giovanni Enrico Bucher.

=== Repression, Henning Boilesen's murder and disarticulation ===
After the kidnapping of the Swiss diplomat by the VPR, the repression against the armed leftist organizations intensified even more. In the first semester of 1971, a series of arrests began that would disarticulate the MRT. On February 5, Aderval Alves Coqueiro was killed by repression. After his murder, Waldemar Andrew, a former MRT militant, was arrested, starting a domino effect that led to the fall of the organization. His arrest was a result of the dismantling of the Red Wing and the investigation into the history of the organization's actions, arriving at the information that the Wing had operated in Votuporanga, in the interior of São Paulo, where some of its militants, native of the region, began to military in the MRT. One of them was Waldemar Andrew, who had left the MRT in 1970, but was denounced by Edgard de Almeida Martins, leader of the Red Wing. Waldemar was arrested and tortured by the DOI-COIDI military, who sought information on the whereabouts of Carlos Lamarca. Not withstanding the torture, he denounced MRT militants.

In a confidential DOPS document, it is stated that during the interrogation of Waldemar on February 7, 1971, it was revealed that one of the individuals closest to Devanir de Carvalho was a militant known as "Márcio", whose identity was not yet known. However, Waldemar provided information that made it possible to identify "Márcio", and the repression learned that this militant was a bank clerk from the countryside, and that he had obtained his driver's license between September 1970 and February 1971. After twelve days of investigation, they discovered "Márcio's" real identity, Antônio André Camargo Guerra; his arrest was carried out on April 3, 1971. From his arrest, the location of Devanir de Carvalho's "apparatus" was facilitated.

On April 5, Devanir de Carvalho was to meet with Job Alves dos Santos of OPCOR. Job Alves dos Santos had been arrested on March 27 and informed the repression agents about the meeting, which was to take place at 10am on Alencar Araripe Street, near the building No. 1000. However, the information that OPCOR had been dismantled by the repression reached the MRT leader. Carlos Eugenio da Paz, of the ALN, warned Devanir not to attend the meeting. With this information, and knowing of some of the arrests of MRT militants, Devanir de Carvalho went to Domingos Quintino dos Santos' "apparatus" on the day that the meeting with Job Alves dos Santos was to take place. Devanir intended to transfer part of the organization's armament that was in that "apparatus" to another, safer location. Arriving there, upon spotting the police, he drew his machine gun and exchanged shots with the authorities, dying on the spot.

In reprisal, on April 15, a joint command of the MRT and the ALN murdered businessman Henning Albert Boilesen, president of Ultra company and an active collaborator of the DOI-CODI. Boilesen was driving his car along Barão de Capanema Street, being followed by militants in two blue Volkswagen. When he reached the intersection with Casa Branca Lane, sensing danger, Boilesen abandoned the car, tried to run, and was shot in the back, taking a few steps and falling behind a car that was parked on Barão de Capanema Street. At that moment, one of the militants shot the victim already fallen. During the action, the drivers threw a large quantity of pamphlets, informing that they had assassinated Boilesen to avenge the death of the MRT leader. Dimas Casemiro, Gilberto Faria Lima and Joaquim Alencar Seixas, of the MRT, and Carlos Eugênio Paz, José Milton Barbosa and Iuri Xavier Pereira, of the ALN, participated in the action.

After Devanir de Carvalho's death, Gilberto Faria de Lima and Dimas Casemiro took over as MRT commanders; however, after Boilesen's 'justification', the MRT would be totally disbanded. On April 16, Joaquim Alencar de Seixas and his son Ivan Seixas were arrested and taken to the DOI-CODI. Joaquim died as a result of the torture. After Seixas' arrest, Dimas Casemiro was killed by repression on the 17th. With most members of the organization arrested or killed, the MRT ceased to exist.

== Political line ==
MRT defined itself as a Marxist–Leninist, revolutionary and anti-imperialist organization. They emphasized guerrilla actions in the urban centers, but without losing sight of the establishment of a popular war in the rural areas of Brazil. Like other organizations of the armed left in that period, MRT understood that one of the reasons that had led to the inaction of the left in the face of the military coup of 1964, was the bureaucratism characteristic of the Brazilian Communist Party (PCB), the hegemonic left-wing force until then. The excessive theoretical discussions were criticized by MRT, prioritizing action over theory.

In its Charter of Principles, written in mid-1970, the MRT regarded the union of the revolutionary organizations as essential for the development of the revolutionary process, besides reinforcing the primacy of practice over theory, with the former as a ratifying or rectifying element of the latter. The idea of union among the revolutionary forces guided the MRT's actions with other armed organizations, aiming at a future fusion into a great revolutionary group in an advanced stage of struggle. The Charter of Principles further defined the political-ideological guidelines of the MRT, adopting a general Marxist–Leninist and anti-imperialist line; proposing an organization based on democratic centralism, in addition to the defense of revolutionary and internationalist solidarity; adoption of the strategy of the prolonged popular war developed within Brazilian conditions and realities, through the union between workers and peasants; and the implementation of the dictatorship of the proletariat to achieve socialism.

In a document dated February 7, 1971, entitled "Reflections on the development of the armed struggle in Brazil", a historical panorama was outlined that contextualized the armed actions and suggested a tactical path to be followed. The document, signed by Gilberto Faria Lima and Dimas Casemiro, was marked by a study of the beginning of the Brazilian military dictatorship and the armed struggle initiated by leftist organizations. Besides characterizing the dictatorship then in force as fascist, it reaffirmed the conviction in the conception of the prolonged popular war, revealing the influence that Maoism constituted on the organization, even though observing that the way to build such a goal had to be with the use of fighting techniques far from those advocated by the Chinese.

The document pointed out that, although revolutionary activity had reached its peak between 1968 and 1969, isolating the dictatorship at the internal political level, it was not able to capitalize on the discontent of the masses around political demands, nor even to attack its economic bases, considered by MRT as the main support of the system, which would guarantee the continuity of the military dictatorship in power. Considering that the left in general would not be able to count on massive participation of the popular classes in the revolutionary process in the short or medium term, due to the repressive escalation after the decree of AI-5, MRT suggested as a tactical solution the development of sabotage actions to undermine the economic base on which the military regime was based. With total political attrition and economic power constantly under threat, the organization's militants considered that the dictatorship would collapse. This document was approved by the MRT command and became the official political line of the organization, so that its actions became focused on urban guerrilla warfare, and the objective of establishing itself in the countryside was left in second place. The last two armed actions of the group, such as the attempt to blow up the Jaguaré Bridge and the assassination of Henning Boilesen, exemplified such methodology that prioritized sabotage and attacks against the economic bases of the regime. By inciting the military dictatorship in the urban centers, it was believed that the task of the organizations that were to install themselves in the rural areas would be facilitated.

== Organization ==
The MRT structured itself differently during the time it was active, the result of its internal contradictions and the flow of militants moving away from or towards the organization.

At the foundation of MRT, in September 1969, the structure of the organization had already been put on the agenda. On that occasion it was decided that the MRT would have a lifetime command, formed by the founding members that were present at the Campos de Jordão meeting: Devanir de Carvalho, Plinio Petersen, Waldemar Andrew, Armênio Souza, Nelson Ferreira, Jorge Kurban Abraaão, João Moraes and Antônio Guerra. The structure of the organization would be based on the molds of that of the PCdoB.

In May 1970, there was a meeting to rediscuss the issue of the organization's command, which implied a change in its structure, and also started a series of political divergences that drove some militants away from the organization. With the departure of militants who formed the lifetime command, an initial proposal was made that the command be integrated by Devanir and Plinio, an idea proposed by Devanir. Plinio, in turn, indicated that Devanir and Waldemar Andrew should be in charge of the organization, a proposal that was accepted after heated discussions. In later meetings, Devanir would have perceived that Plinio was "taking possession" of the actual command of the organization, since everything that he proposed was supported by Waldemar, determining the majority of votes and, consequently, the acceptance of the decisions. Devanir, who was in fact the founder of the organization and its boss, was losing his position and feared that the organization would deviate from its primary scope. Because of this, Devanir broke with Petersen, supported by Antônio Guerra and the other guerrilla organizations that made up the armed front. Petersen, Waldemar, and Armênio Souza then walked away from the MRT.

After the withdrawal of these militants, who had participated in the organization since its foundation, the family of Joaquim Alencar de Seixas, Dimas Casemiro and Gilberto Faria Lima joined MRT, remaining in the organization until the end. In mid 1970, then, the command of MRT was formed by Devanir de Carvalho, Antônio Guerra and Joaquim Seixas. At this time contacts with ex-militants of the Red Wing of Minas Gerais narrowed, and although a merger with this group was not effected, the militants from Minas Gerais founded the MRM, an organization that soon migrated to São Paulo and began to act together with the MRT, even counting on its support and logistical and financial support.

In March 1971, shortly before the disarticulation of the organization, the command of the MRT was changed, and Dimas Casemiro joined it in place of Joaquim Seixas. Joaquim Seixas had been removed due to factors that threatened the security of the militants, such as driving the organization's vehicles at high speed; showing little care as a driver; offending the drivers of the cars; and that by acting this way he put his own physical integrity and that of the militants being driven at risk. With this change, the MRT began to be structured by a command composed of three militants (Devanir, Casemiro, and Guerra), and by two bases. The first, called "Eduardo Leite Base", was formed by Devanir, who assumed its coordination, Guerra, Joaquim Seixas and Domingos Quintino dos Santos. The second, called the "Yoshitane Fujimori Base" consisted of Casemiro, its coordinator, Gilberto Faria Lima, José Rodrigues Ângelo Júnior and Ivan Seixas. Joaquim Seixas' two daughters, Iara and Ieda, were connected to the Eduardo Leite and Yoshitane Fujimore bases, respectively, but only those who participated in the armed actions were considered militants of the organization, which is why it is speculated that several people had orbited around the organization.

The organization established some guidelines for carrying out armed actions, seeking to know the objective of the action, the location where it would take place, the firepower and mobilization of the target to be hit, seeking to always be in numerical and fire superiority, and finally, the surprise factor. Besides carrying out armed actions, MRT sought to organize itself with bases that would express a legal façade to the organization. In this sense, the MRT's familiar "apparatuses" were fundamental in assisting militants articulated on the armed front, allowing a façade upon which the organizations could act with a certain amount of security and freedom.

MRT expressed great concern about the safety of its militants, establishing a series of guidelines for the holding of meetings with militants from other organizations and for the operation of its "apparatus". It recommended that before meeting with other militants, members of the organization should arrive fifteen minutes before the appointed time to check for abnormalities, to get to know the area of the meeting and not to schedule them in fixed places, such as bars, squares or bus stops. Their "apparatus" should be structured according to strict planning criteria. The militants' "apparatus" should be occupied by a maximum of two people, who would be restricted to knowing the place. Nothing was to be compromised in them, and conditions were to be created for them to be rented under false names, serving as a residence for clandestine militants, eventually being used for meetings or shelter for other militants sought by repression. It was recommended that at least one of the occupants of the "apparatus" knew how to drive, so that others could be driven to the place with their eyes closed, and thus not know its location. Base "apparatus" were to be the places used for meetings and were to store political documents, weapons and equipment necessary for the tasks of the organization. The organic "apparatus" were to be used for the organization's special needs, serving as printing presses, warehouses, shelters for highly sought-after militants, intermediate transportation network posts, and summit meetings between commanders and sub-commanders. Finally, the "apparatus" of allies were to be used in cases of emergency and on a temporary basis, belonging to individuals who were not officially militants but sympathetic to the organization. The "apparatus" were understood as central to the MRT organization, and fundamental to the development of the armed struggle. However, despite the different classification of "apparatuses" into four types, elaborated by the MRT, its most important "apparatuses" revolved around family nuclei, the families of the workers who composed the organization, blending many of the characteristics of the different "apparatuses" typified by the group.

The MRT valued the tightness between the leading sectors and the bases, based on the idea that the more compartmentalized the contacts and information between the different sectors of the organization, the more vulnerable the information and militants would become to repression. The less a militant knew, the less information he could reveal to the repressive organs, should he be arrested and exposed to torture. The only links between the different MRT sectors were to be made by their coordinators, and at the base, as much as possible, tightness was to be respected. Militants were to know only the comrades of the base in which they militated and others who acted together.

As for the organization's internal communication, the importance of political cohesion was emphasized for the organization's alliances, since this would imply greater discipline and a harmonious policy. The organization had to maintain this cohesion by creating functional organic channels to avoid the tendency for parallel contacts to solve certain differences. Internal debate was free and encouraged. Every document written by a militant should be discussed at the base or sector level before being printed. The accumulation of documents should be avoided, since they could make fruitful discussions impossible, and internal communication should be as fast and efficient as possible. Political information and that related to security should be carefully forwarded to the higher echelons who would be in charge of disseminating it throughout the organization.

== See also ==
- DOI-CODI
- Henning Albert Boilesen
- Charles Burke Elbrick
- Carlos Marighella
- 8th October Revolutionary Movement
- Communist Party of Brazil
- Ação Libertadora Nacional
- Military dictatorship in Brazil
- 1969 kidnapping of the United States Ambassador to Brazil
- List of people killed by and disappeared during the Brazilian military dictatorship

== Bibliography ==
- Carvalho, Yuri Rosa (2014). Se dez vidas tivesse, dez daria: o Movimento Revolucionário Tiradentes e a participação da classe trabalhadora na resistência (1964-1971) (Thesis). Universidade Federal de Santa Maria (UFSM).
- Gorender, Jacob (2014). Combate nas trevas. São Paulo: Expressão Popular.
- Paz, Carlos Eugênio (2008). Viagem à luta armada. Rio de Janeiro: Best Bolso.
- Silva, Tadeu Antonio Dix (2006). Ala vermelha: revolução, autocrítica e repressão judicial no Estado de São Paulo (1967-1974) (PhD thesis) (in Portuguese). São Paulo: Universidade de São Paulo. doi:10.11606/t.8.2007.tde-10072007-102720.
