= Franklin Martins =

Brazilian journalist

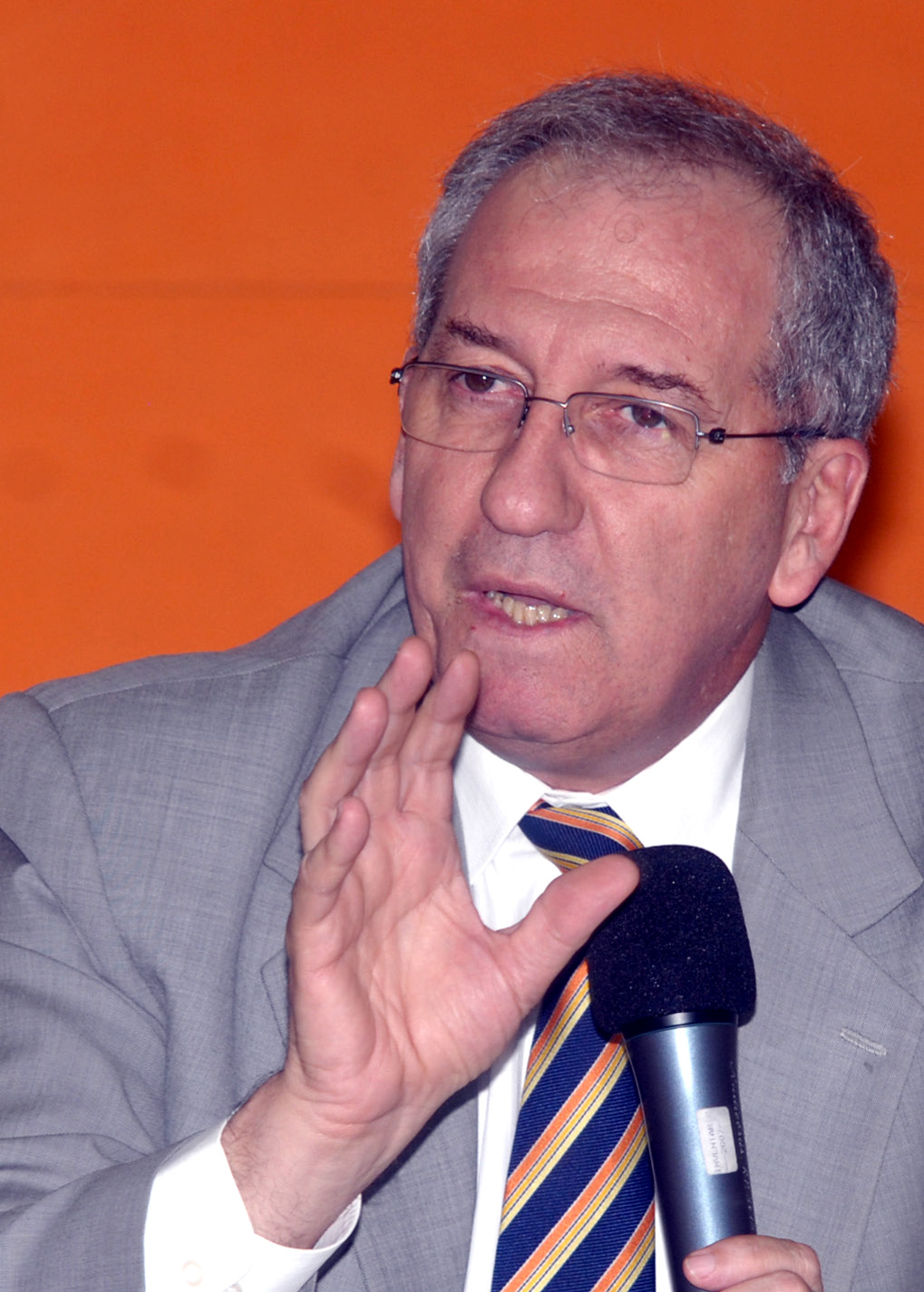
Franklin Martins

Franklin de Sousa Martins (born August 10, 1948) is a Brazilian journalist who served as Press Secretary for the government of President Luiz Inácio Lula da Silva of Brazil.

== Biography ==
Martins was born in Vitória.

He started working as a journalist at 15, as an intern in the pro-Vargas newspaper Última Hora.

At 20, as a student of Economical Sciences at the Federal University of Rio de Janeiro (then University of Guanabara), Franklin was elected chairman of the Student's Executive (DCE) and, soon after, vice-chairman of the Metropolitan Union of Students, in Rio de Janeiro. By then, Martins approached then fellow student leader José Dirceu, who was to become a founding member of the Workers Party and a grey eminence behind Luiz Inácio Lula da Silva.

As a youth, Martins was not only a student leader but after the 1964 coup d'état in Brazil, engaged in armed struggle and urban guerrilla. In the communist group MR-8, he was known as Valdir (codename). During the military dictatorship, he had a prominent role within the movements which fought against the regime. The acts included bank robbery (then called revolutionary expropriation by the guerrilla rhetorics) and assaults on police and military. The amount was used to buy weapons and bribe authorities to release fellow militants. Franklin Martins was held in prison between October and December 1968, being released on the eve of Institutional Act#5, which dissolved the Congress, and institutionalized censorship and torture in Brazil.

In September 1969, he joined and led the joint group of the MR-8 and the National Action for Liberation (ALN) which kidnapped the US ambassador Charles Burke Elbrick. The act was carried to force the junta to set free 15 political prisoners. For taking part in the kidnapping, Franklin Martins is still denied entrance in the United States, even in an official state position (along as Fernando Gabeira, who was also involved).

Martins lived in Cuba, Chile and France, where he graduated at the École de Sciences Sociales of the University of Paris. While in Cuba, in the Pinar del Río province, he attended guerrilla lessons, learning to operate weapons, explosives and military tactics.

After the general amnesty proclaimed in Brazil in 1979, Franklin Martins returned home and resumed work as a journalist. Ironically, he eventually went to work at the Globo TV network, one of the main supporters of the military regime. In 1996, he became political commentator of the broadcast news, Jornal Nacional and Jornal da Globo. In May 2006, he was suddenly dismissed by the news director, Ali Kamel.

After a brief stay at rival Bandeirantes network, Martins was called by president Lula to head the Department of Social Communication, a ministry-rank post equivalent to Press Secretary. One of his main projects developed in this position was the creation of TV Brasil, the first public TV network in the nation (although formally state-owned).
