= Boanerges de Souza Massa =

Brazilian physician

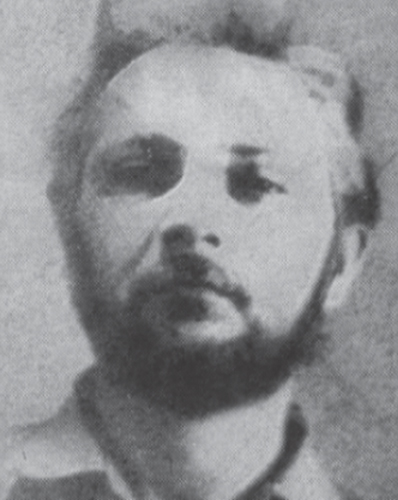
- At USP Faculty of Medicine, age 27
- Born: January 7, 1938; Avaré, São Paulo, Brazil
- Disappeared: June 21, 1972 (aged 34); Formosa, Goiás, Brazil
- Status: Missing for 54 years, 2 months and 11 days
- Education: University of São Paulo
- Organization(s): Ação Libertadora Nacional, MOLIPO

Boanerges de Souza Massa (born January 7, 1938 – disappeared June 21, 1972) was a Brazilian physician who joined the resistance against the military dictatorship. He was the field surgeon of the National Liberation Action (Portuguese: Ação Libertadora Nacional, ALN) founded by Carlos Marighella. After the police liquidated Marighella, he went to Cuba to take guerilla courses and co-founded the People's Liberation Movement (Portuguese: Movimento de Libertação Popular Brasileiro, MOLIPO). The army captured him in 1971 in Pindorama and he disappeared shortly thereafter. 25 years later, the Brazilian government officially acknowledged its responsibility.

== Biographical record ==
Boanerges de Souza Massa was born on January 7, 1938, in Avaré, São Paulo, to Francisco de Souza Massa and Laura Alves Massa. He married Maria Lucia Sant'Anna Saadi Kerbeg in São Paulo on January 9, 1969. In the 1980s the authorities granted her a divorce because her husband had disappeared for a decade. In the 1990s the authorities granted Boanerges' brother Cyro Massa a 100,000 reais compensation because his brother had disappeared for two decades after being in government custody.

== Early life and education ==
Boanerges de Souza Massa was born in a rural area and worked as teacher and accountant to pay for his studies. He was admitted to the Medicine School and the Law School of the University of São Paulo. He graduated from the former in December 1965 and the latter in June 1966. He interned at the University of São Paulo Faculty of Medicine Clinics Hospital. He is the co-author of a published academic research article on leptospirosis.

In July 1962, Boanerges was invited to speak to John F. Kennedy on the lawn of the White House as part of a delegation of the Alliance for Progress. A journalist reported: "Wagging his finger, the student from Avaré questioned the President of the United States on his interference in poor countries." In medical school he was designated as commencement speaker for the Class of 1965, but his speech was censored for being critical of the military dictatorship.

== Doctor of the ALN ==
Over the years, Boanerges de Souza Massa gravitated towards the militant group Ação Libertadora Nacional (ALN). On May 8, 1969, the ALN robbed a bank and killed a policeman, but one of their members, Takao Amano, was wounded. It was Boanerges who gave him emergency medical care and extracted the bullet.

On June 4, 1969, the ALM conducted another bank robbery, leaving one soldier dead. Two bullets wounded Francisco Gomes da Silva, the brother of ALN leader Virgilio Gomes da Silva (codename Jonas in the Oscar-nominated movie Four Days in September about the kidnapping of US ambassador Charles Burke Elbrick). Boanerges, along with the rest of the ALN commando, hijacked a hospital to treat the wounded. This 4-hour operation was medically successful, but Boanerges was recognized by the hospital staff and forced into clandestinity.

Over the course of 1969, the most actively sought-after opponents to the military dictatorship became known as the "Marighella 7", among which Boanerges. He escaped from Brazil thanks to false identity papers provided by Dominicans. Traveling through Uruguay, Boanerges linked up in Argentina with other ALN operatives, and they hijacked an airplane to fly to Cuba where they took refuge.

== MOLIPO ==
In Cuba, Boanerges de Souza Massa lived with other exiled Brazilians in a house provided by the Cuba. They took guerilla classes: physical training in the morning, political in the afternoon. Their goal was to return to Brazil and liberate their country from the military dictatorship. To this end they formed a new Marxist revolutionary organization, the MOLIPO, abbreviation of Movimento de Libertação Popular (in English: People's Liberation Movement).

Boanerges de Souza Massa was the first MOLIPO operative to be sent back to Brazil to establish a rural guerilla base in the Northeast region. But counter-insurgency forces were aware of his return. He was the first to be captured, in Pindorama, on December 21, 1971. According to the sociologist Renato Dias:

A document from the National Archive says that the capture of Boanerges de Souza Massa accelerated the dismantlement of the [MOLIPO] group...

== Disappearance ==
As for the fate of Boanerges himself, according to the Special Commission on Political Deaths and Disappearances:

Among all the Brazilian political disappearances, the case of Boanerges de Souza Massa is one of those most surrounded by doubts, mysteries and controversies.

He was seen in prison by other political prisoners, but his arrest was never officially registered by the security organs of the military regime. As late as 1995, his name was not on the official list of dead and missing political activists. A declassified Army document says that he was physically impaired to the point that his identification would be difficult. His body was never found. Yet for the family there is no doubt: he was murdered in prison. His brother, Cyro Massa, said:

At the time Boanerges disappeared, my family was not informed of his arrest. It is public that, in prison, torture was used so that prisoners would reveal what they knew. What I want to know is where the body of my brother is. This information will have to come out of the archives.

After a proof of his incarceration dated June 21, 1972, was produced, the Brazilian government officially acknowledged responsibility for his disappearance on September 5, 1997. Investigative journalist Taís Morais, based on her extensive interview with a member of the secret services codenamed Carioca, finally revealed in 2008 that Boanerges de Souza Massa had been killed and buried near the city of Formosa in the state of Goiás. On November 22, 2012, Victor Manoel Mariz, Public Prosecutor of the State of Tocantins, sued Lieutenant Colonel Lício Maciel for the unlawful arrest, torture and murder of Boanerges de Souza Massa.

== General sources ==
- Boanerges de Souza Massa article at Portuguese Wikipedia.

== See also ==
- List of people who disappeared mysteriously: 1910–1990
