= Four Days in September =

1997 film directed by Bruno Barreto

- Original film poster
- Directed by: Bruno Barreto
- Written by: Leopoldo Serran
- Based on: O Que É Isso, Companheiro? by Fernando Gabeira
- Produced by: Lucy Barreto; Luiz Carlos Barreto
- Starring: Alan Arkin; Pedro Cardoso; Fernanda Torres; Cláudia Abreu; Luiz Fernando Guimarães; Caroline Kava; Fisher Stevens
- Cinematography: Félix Monti
- Edited by: Isabelle Rathery
- Music by: Stewart Copeland
- Production companies: Filmes do Equador; Luiz Carlos Barreto Produções Cinematográficas
- Distributed by: RioFilme
- Release date: 19 April 1997
- Running time: 110 minutes
- Country: Brazil
- Languages: Portuguese; English
- Box office: R$1.8 million

Four Days in September (Portuguese: O Que É Isso, Companheiro?, lit. 'What Was That, Comrade?') is a 1997 Brazilian thriller film directed by Bruno Barreto and produced by his parents Lucy and Luiz Carlos Barreto. It is a dramatized version of the 1969 kidnapping of the United States Ambassador to Brazil, Charles Burke Elbrick, by members of Revolutionary Movement 8th October (MR-8) and Ação Libertadora Nacional (ALN).

It was nominated as Best Foreign Language Film at the 70th Academy Awards.

== Background ==
The film is "loosely based" on the 1979 memoir O Que É Isso, Companheiro? (in English: What Was That, Comrade?), written by politician Fernando Gabeira. In 1969, as a member of Revolutionary Movement 8th October (MR-8), a student guerrilla group, he participated in the abduction of the United States ambassador to Brazil, negotiating to gain release of leftist political prisoners. MR-8 was protesting the recent takeover of Brazil by a military government and seeking the release of political prisoners. But, the military further increased its repression of dissent, MR-8 and ALN members were tortured by the police, and democracy was not re-established in Brazil until 1985.

Gabeira later became a journalist and politician, elected as congressman from the Green Party.

== Plot ==
The film is a fictionalized version of the dramatic events of the abduction of the American ambassador Charles Burke Elbrick (played by Alan Arkin). Elbrick was kidnapped in Rio de Janeiro by the Revolutionary Movement 8th October (MR-8) with the help of the Ação Libertadora Nacional. Gabeira (played by Pedro Cardoso and named Paulo in the film) as a student joins the radical movement after Brazil's military overthrew its government in a 1964 coup. In 1969, he and his comrades decide to kidnap the American ambassador to protest the Brazilians' coup; the film busies itself with the group's conspiring and execution of the crime. Paulo is portrayed as "the most intelligent and uncertain of the kidnappers."

The film explores Paulo's love affair with Andréia, the guerrilla leader. It suggests a kind of friendship developing between Paulo and Elbrick. The ambassador is portrayed as a decent man who shares some of his kidnappers' frustrations regarding the Brazilian military dictatorship, and one who fulfills his duty to his own government.

== Cast ==
The main characters include:

- Paulo / Fernando Gabeira (Pedro Cardoso) - member of the MR-8 guerrilla group and one of the kidnappers.
- Andréia / Maria (Fernanda Torres) - the beautiful and tough MR-8 guerrilla-group leader who falls in love with Paulo/Fernando.
- Charles Burke Elbrick (Alan Arkin) - the American ambassador, who forms a bond with Paulo/Fernando.
- Jonas / Virgílio Gomes da Silva (Matheus Nachtergaele) - member of ALN guerrilla group
- Marcão / Franklin Martins (Luiz Fernando Guimarães) - second in command to the MR-8 guerrilla group and one of the kidnappers.
- Renée / Vera Sílvia Magalhães (Cláudia Abreu) - member of the MR-8 guerrilla group and one of the kidnappers.
- Toledo / Joaquim Câmara Ferreira (Nélson Dantas) - member of ALN guerrilla group. He's a Spanish expatriate in Brazil that fought the dictatorship of Francoist Spain
- Henrique (Marco Ricca) - former Navy enlistee and member of the National Intelligence Service of Brazil
- Brandão (Maurício Gonçalves) - member of the National Intelligence Service of Brazil
- Júlio / Cid Benjamin (Caio Junqueira) - member of the MR-8 guerrilla group and one of the kidnappers.
- César / Oswaldo (Selton Mello) - member of the MR-8 guerrilla group, arrested prior to the kidnapping of the Ambassador.
- Dona Margarida / Elba Souto-Maior (Fernanda Montenegro)
- Lília (Alessandra Negrini) - wife of Henrique
- Mowinkel (Fisher Stevens)
- Jorge Cherques

== Reception ==
=== Critical response ===
The film had mixed reviews. Four Days in September has an approval rating of 59% on review aggregator website Rotten Tomatoes, based on 17 reviews, and an average rating of 6.5/10.

Stephen Holden of The New York Times wrote, "Four Days in September is an uneasy hybrid of political thriller and high-minded meditation on terrorism, its psychology and its consequences." He noted that the film suggests the kidnapping was followed by worse political events, with increased repression, and torture of MR-8 members. He describes Cardoso as the most complex character.

Roger Ebert gave it two stars, saying the film was marked by a "quiet sadness" and the "film examines the way that naive idealists took on more than they could handle." He suggests that the film tries to humanize both sides but seems muddled. Ebert writes, "The point of view is that of a middle-age man who no longer quite understands why, as a youth, he was so sure of things that now seem so puzzling."

=== Awards ===
Internationally, the film was nominated for many awards, including Best Foreign Language Film by the Academy Awards. Brazil entered it into the 47th Berlin International Film Festival.

== See also ==
- List of submissions to the 70th Academy Awards for Best Foreign Language Film
- List of Brazilian submissions for the Academy Award for Best Foreign Language Film
