= José Mindlin =

Brazilian writer, lawyer, businessman and journalist

José Ephim Mindlin
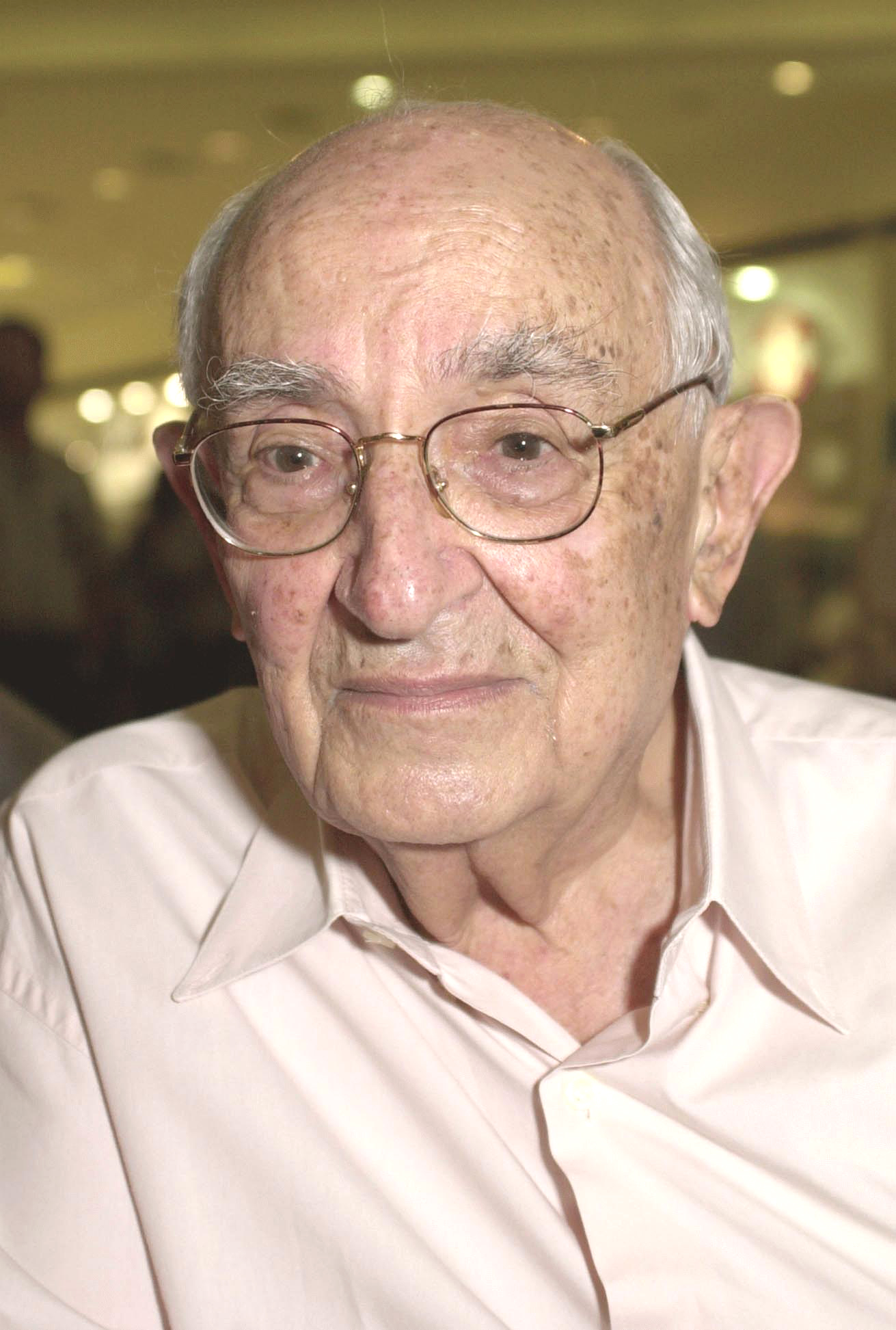
- José Mindlin
- Born: September 8, 1914; São Paulo, Brazil
- Died: February 28, 2010 (aged 95)
- Occupations: Lawyer, Businessperson
- Known for: Co-founder of car part supplier Metal Leve and book collector
- Spouse: Guita Mindlin (died 2006)
- Children: 4

José Ephim Mindlin (September 8, 1914 – February 28, 2010) was a Brazilian lawyer, businessperson and bibliophile, born to Ukrainian Jewish parents from Odessa.

== Early life and education ==
Son of dentist Ephim Mindlin and of Fanny Mindlin, both born in Odessa, he graduated from the University of São Paulo law school.

== Career ==
He worked as a lawyer for 15 years, until he founded with some friends Metal Leve, an automobile piston company, which went on to become a large international player in the automobile parts industry.

After years of successful management of the firm as a Director, the opening of the Brazilian markets in the 1990s reduced Metal Leve's profits, and he and his business associates sold the firm in 1996 to German firm Mahle GmbH.

Mindlin and Antônio Ermírio de Moraes were the only two Brazilian businessmen who refused cooperation with Henning Albert Boilesen in the sponsorship of the so-called Operação Bandeirante - a repressive structure to be created to cooperate with the military dictatorship in Brazil. Its main interface with the military regime and the business world was the businessman Henning Albert Boilesen. It is believed that Henning Albert Boilesen was supported by the CIA. The organization was responsible for torture, disappearance and extra judicial killings and kidnappings of numerous Brazilians who opposed the dictatorship.

== Personal life ==
Mindlin was married to Guita Mindlin, who died in 2006, and they had 4 children and 11 grandchildren.

After retiring from the business world, Mindlin began collecting and preserving rare books, beginning with a 1740 edition of Discours sur l'Histoire universelle (Discourse on Universal History) by Jacques-Bénigne Bossuet.

On 20 June 2006, Mindlin was elected member of the Academia Brasileira de Letras, occupying chair number 29, left open since the death of Brazilian author Josué Montello.

He was also a member of the Vitae Foundation and is the editor of Edusp publishing firm.

== Death and legacy ==
He died from a multiple organ failure at the age of 95 on February 28, 2010.

On his death he was the owner of the largest private library in Latin America, with more than 38,000 titles. A large number (about half) of the collection had been donated to the University of São Paulo in May 2006, mostly covering Brazilian studies. On March 23, 2013 a building was built in the university's campus specifically to maintain this massive library, named after the Guita and José Mindlin Foundation, who made the donation. Mindlin had said he wanted to keep the library alive through the continuous growth of the collection and scientific contributions by academics.

Preceded by Josué Montello	Brazilian Academy of Letters - Occupant of the 29th chair 2006–2010	Succeeded by Geraldo Holanda Cavalcanti
