= Paulo Costa Lima =

Brazilian composer and music theorist

Paulo Costa Lima (born 26 September 1954, in Salvador, Bahia) is a Brazilian composer and music theorist. A member of the Brazilian Academy of Music, his work focuses on the relationship between musical composition and cultural processes, including their political dimensions. His research addresses composition as a form of critical practice, particularly in relation to cultural asymmetries between centers and peripheries, and to the critique of what has been described as the “waste of experience.”

Within this perspective, Costa Lima’s work examines the traditional circulation of ideas in which theoretical frameworks are predominantly produced in central regions and subsequently absorbed by peripheral contexts, often disregarding the capacity of peripheral experiences to generate theory-based musical practices.

Since 2020, Costa Lima has also engaged in public dissemination through social media by publishing short video analyses of Brazilian popular songs. These videos, which frequently highlight structural, historical, or poetic aspects unfamiliar to the general audience, have attracted significant public interest, leading to an audience of more than 200,000 followers.

== Early life and education ==
Born in Salvador, Bahia, Brazil, in 1954, Paulo Costa Lima studied musical composition in Brazil with Lindembergue Cardoso and Ernst Widmer, and later in the United States with Ben Johnston and Herbert Brün at the University of Illinois.

He holds two doctoral degrees, awarded by the Federal University of Bahia (UFBA) and the University of São Paulo (USP). One of his doctoral dissertations focused on the pedagogy of music composition, while the other examined Ernst Widmer’s use of octatonic strategies in composition.

His first doctorate resulted in the Copene Prize in 1999 and in the publication of a book, while an abbreviated version of his second doctoral research was published in the Latin American Music Review in 2001.

== Career ==
Costa Lima became a professor at the Universidade Federal da Bahia in 1979, where he has held several academic and administrative positions, including Director of the School of Music (1988–1992) and Assistant Provost (1996–2002). As a teacher of composition, he has supervised and mentored several composers, including Paulo Rios Filho, Alex Pochat, Guilherme Bertissolo, Tulio Augusto, Vinicius Amaro, Paulo Cesar Santana, Pedro Amorim Filho, and Danniel Ferraz, among others.

Lima is associated with the second generation of the movement initiated by the Group of Composers of Bahia, which positioned itself against implicit adherence to established aesthetic standards. The group’s concise manifesto—“In principle, we are against all and every principle”—expresses an oppositional stance combined with an emphasis on inclusivity, suggesting that all compositional proposals should be considered valid and open to discussion.

Costa Lima’s compositions have been performed by numerous orchestras and ensembles in Brazil and abroad. These include the Orchestra of the Federal University of Bahia (1987, Ritorna Vivaldi; 2016, Cavalo Marinho; 2018, Alá, Reitoria da UFBA), the Bahia Ensemble (1993, Atotô do L'homme Armé), the American Conposers Orchestra (1996, L'homme Armé, Carnegie Hall), the Juilliard New Music Ensemble (2001, Atotô do L'homme Armé, Lincoln Center), the Los Angeles Philarmonic Orchestra (2003, Atotô do L'homme Armé, Benaroya Hall), and the Bahia State Orchestra (1986, Halley Ouverture; 2005, Eine Kleine Atotô Muisk; 2017, Tempuê; 2021, Alá and Atotô do L'homme Armé; 2022, Zaratempo, Teatro Castro Alves). His works have also been performed by the UFRJ Orchestra (2013, Bahia Concerto op. 98), the São Paulo State Symphony Orchestra (2000, Serenata Kabila; 2015 and 2019, Cabinda: We are black op. 104; 2021, Oji: Chegança e ìmpeto, all commissioned), the Neojibá Orchestra (2015, Seven arrows op. 102, Teatro Municipal Rio de Janeiro), São Paulo Chamber Soloists (2021, Concertino for Clarinet, New York, Americas Society at Park Avenue), the Utah Symphony Orchestra (2022, Oji, Abravanel Hall), the Campinas Symphonic Orchestra (2016 and 2024, several works), the Porto Alegre Symphonic Orchestra (2023, Alá), the USP Symphonic Orchestra (2023, Alá), the USP Chamber Orchestra (2024, Atotô, ECAM), GRUPU (2017, Chega de Caboclo, Universidade de Campinas and European tour), and the Essen Festival für Neue Musik (2017, Cauíza for ten percussionists).

Overall, his works have received more than 600 performances in over 25 countries, in venues such as Konzerthaus Berlin, Carnegie Hall, Lincoln Center, Benaroya Hall, De Rode Pomp, Sala Cecília Meireles, Sala São Paulo, and Teatro Castro Alves. In 2001, he was included in the New Grove Dictionary of Music and Musicians in an entry written by Gerard Béhague, and in 2016 the State University of Campinas organized a festival dedicated to his work.

In 2011, Costa Lima proposed the notion of compositionality, defined as the attributes of that which is composed. The concept encompasses at least five dimensions: the invention of worlds; commitment to critique; reciprocity; the continuous interaction between theory and practice; and the field of choices, understood as intrinsic to compositional decision-making. Musicologist Ilza Nogueira has observed in Costa Lima’s 1993 composition Atotô do L'homme armé (op. 39) “a procedure of fusion of the appropriated elements (the melodic line and the rhythmic pattern), which compromises their identities and displaces them from their original signifying contexts).”

Between 2005 and 2008, Costa Lima served as president of the Fundação Gregório de Mattos, the cultural agency of the city of Salvador. During this period, he created programs such as the Mestres Populares da Cultura (transl. Popular Masters of Culture), which recognized elderly individuals with extensive knowledge of ethnic-popular traditions. Other civic initiatives include the organization of a public event involving 456 capoeira practitioners, who walked and danced through the streets of Salvador in celebration of the city’s anniversary in 2005. He also coordinated the cultural program of the Sociedade Brasileira para o Progresso da Ciência meeting held in Salvador in 2001, with an emphasis on fostering dialogue between the arts and sciences.

In the last four years, Costa Lima has published online videos analyzing Brazilian popular songs. As of January 2026, he has nearly 200,000 followers on Instagram.

== Personal life ==
Paulo Costa Lima married violinist Ana Margarida de Almeida Cerqueira Lima in 1976; they have two sons, Cláudio and Maurício.

== Awards and honors ==
Paulo Costa Lima has received numerous awards and institutional distinctions as a composer from national and international organizations. These include prizes from the Goethe Institut in Salvador (1985, for Ritorna Vivaldi for strings), the Bienal de Música Brasileira Contemporânea in Rio de Janeiro (1985, for String Quartet II), the Max Feffer Prize (1992, for Ibejis), the Vitae Foundation (1995), the American Composers Orchestra (1996), the Secretary of Culture of the State of Bahia (2009), and the Fundação Nacional de Artes (2013, 2015, 2017, 2019, 2021, and 2023).

In addition to awards, Costa Lima has received several commissions that mark significant moments in his career. In 1995, the work Xiré was commissioned by the Secretary of Culture of the State of São Paulo. In 2014, Cabinda: nós somos pretos was commissioned by the State Orchestra of São Paulo, followed in 2020 by the commission of Oji: Chegança e Ímpeto. In 2017, Cauiza for percussion was commissioned by the Music Council of the City of Stuttgart, Germany. In 2022, ZARATEMPO was commissioned by the Bahia State Orchestra in celebration of its 40th anniversary. In 2024, Serenata Concertante for percussion was commissioned by the Orquestra Municipal de Campinas, and Soprei o mundo was commissioned by the Simpósio Ibero-Americano de Clarinete Bajo.

Costa Lima is a member of the Academia de Letras de Bahia and a founding member of the Academia de Ciências da Bahia, established in 2011. Since 2003, he has been recognized as a researcher by the National Council for Scientific and Technological Development.

In 2015, Costa Lima was awarded first place at the Bienal de Música Brasileira Contemporânea, following an indication by 85 Brazilian composers and conductors.

== Selected works ==
=== Books ===
- Seminários de Carnaval I. Salvador: EDUFBA, 1988. v. '. 209 p. (Org.)
- Seminários de Carnaval II. Salvador: EDUFBA, 1998. v. 1. 248 p. (Org.)
- O Ensino de Composição Musical na Bahia (1999)
- Ernst Widmer e o ensino de composição musical na Bahia. Salvador: Copene-Fazcultura, 1999, 358 p.
- Quem Faz Salvador? Salvador: UFBA; Pró-Reitoria de Extensão, 2002. v. 1. 348 p. (Org.)
- Invenção e Memória. Salvador: Edufba, 2005, 312 p. available at
- Musica Popular e Adjacências. Salvador: Edufba, 2010, available at
- Música Popular e outras Adjacências. Salvador: Edufba, 2012,
- Teoria e Prática do Compor I. Salvador: Edufba, 2012, available at:
- Teoria e Prática do Compor II. Salvador: Edufba, 2014, available at
- Teoria e Prática do Compor III: Lugar de fala e memória. Salvador, Edufba, 2016
- Teoria e Prática do Compor IV: Horizontes metodológicos. Edufba, 2016.
- Teoria e Prática do Compor V: Ensaios sobre composição e annálise. Edufba, 2021

=== Albums ===
- Outros Ritmos. Salvador, Prêmio Copene, 1996
- José Eduardo Martins 60 (Imikaiá e Ponteio-Estudo), 1998
- Impressionem (Kreuzberg Records), Matias de Oliveira Pinto (Corrente de Xangô), 1997
- Uma festa brasileira (Ed. Paulus 1998), José Ananias e Edelton Gloeden (Apanhe o Jegue e Lembrando e Esquecendo Pixinguinha)
- XI Festival de Música Instrumental da Bahia (Ibejis for flute and clarinet), 2003
- Bossa nova series (live) Antonio Eduardo Santos (Eis Aqui), 2003
