= 1969 kidnapping of the United States Ambassador to Brazil =

- Native name: Sequestro do embaixador dos Estados Unidos no Brasil em 1969
- Date: September 4–7, 1969
- Duration: 78 hours
- Organised by: National Liberation Action and October 8th Revolutionary Movement

In 1969, United States Ambassador to Brazil Charles Burke Elbrick was kidnapped by the National Liberation Action (ALN) and the 8th October Revolutionary Movement (MR8) in protest of the US-backed military dictatorship. Fernando Gabeira and Virgílio Gomes da Silva helped plan and execute the operation. In order to begin negotiations, the kidnappers demanded that their letter-manifesto be read and printed in the media, which was done. The ambassador was released after 78 hours in exchange for the release of 15 political prisoners imprisoned by the military dictatorship, who were exiled to Mexico. It was among the most high-profile guerrilla actions taken against the military dictatorship (1964–1985).

The 15 political prisoners left the Galeão Air Force Base for Mexico in a Lockheed C-130 Hercules belonging to the Brazilian Air Force.

Thirteen of the 15 political prisoners released in exchange for the release of Ambassador Elbrick appeared in a photo taken before their exile in Mexico: Luís Travassos, José Dirceu, José Ibraim, Onofre Pinto, Ricardo Vilasboas Sá Rego, Maria Augusta Carneiro, Ricardo Zarattini, and Rolando Fratti, standing up. João Leonardo da Silva Rocha, Agonalto Pacheco da Silva, Vladimir Palmeira, Ivens Marchetti and Flávio Tavares kneeling. Gregório Lourenço Bezerra and Mario Roberto Zanconato do not appear in the photo. Onofre Pinto and João Leonardo da Silva Rocha were assassinated by the dictatorship in 1974 and 1975, respectively.

Fernando Gabeira described his experience in the book O Que É Isso, Companheiro?. It was made into the film Four Days in September, directed by Bruno Barreto.

== See also ==
- Tiradentes Revolutionary Movement (1969–1971)
- Assassination of Charles Rodney Chandler
