= Yara Yavelberg =

Brazilian psychologist

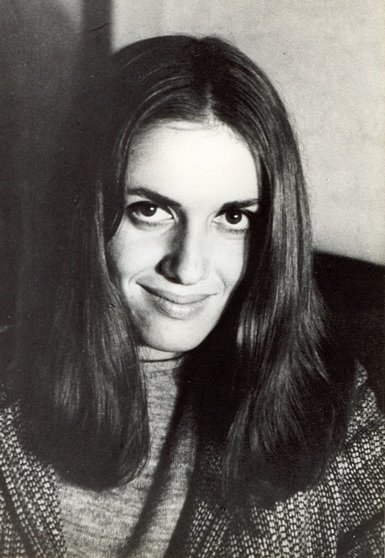
Yara Yavelberg

Yara Yavelberg (São Paulo, May 7, 1944 – Salvador, August 20, 1971) was a Marxist activist and a member of the armed resistance against Brazilian military dictatorship. A psychologist and professor, she joined the fight against the military regime, first as a member of the Marxist Revolutionary Organization Workers' Politics (Polop) and later the Revolutionary Movement of October 8 (MR-8). She became the partner of former army captain Carlos Lamarca, one of the key leaders of the armed opposition to Brazil's military government, until her death during a security forces raid in Salvador, Bahia, in August 1971. Her case was one of those investigated by the Truth Commission, which examined deaths and disappearances during Brazil's military dictatorship.

== Biography ==
Yara Yavelberg was born in São Paulo, daughter of David and Eva Yavelberg. She was initially a passive supporter of the resistance movement, but eventually became a member of MR-8. She had a relationship with Carlos Lamarca, a Brazilian Army officer who deserted and became one of the most important leaders of the guerrilla movement that opposed the dictatorship. With the collapse of the guerrilla movement, Yavelberg and Lamarca fled to Bahia.

Yavelberg and Lamarca were relentlessly persecuted by the military regime. They last saw each other in early 1971 when they had to split up. Over time, the army police began to close in on Lamarca and anyone associated with him, including Yavelberg. According to a report, during Operation Pajussara (which involved the participation of more than 200 police officers and aimed to capture Lamarca), Yara allegedly shot herself in an apartment in Pituba (Salvador, Bahia) on August 19, 1971. At first, the military prevented her body from being released for burial. The body was delivered to her family only a month after her death, in a sealed coffin, with an explicit prohibition to be opened. Yara was buried in the Jewish Cemetery of São Paulo.

In 2003, roughly 30 years after her death, after years of denials, Yara's family, dissatisfied with the official ruling of suicide, obtained a court order from the São Paulo State Court of Justice to have her body exhumed. The Federation of Jewish Communities of São Paulo carried out the exhumation, as her remains had originally been delivered to the family in a sealed coffin. More than thirty years later, her remains were finally relocated from the suicide section to a burial site near her parents' grave in another area of the Jewish cemetery.

== Homages ==
University of São Paulo's Psychology Institute paid a homage to Yavelberg, an alumnus of their Psychology School, by naming its academic center the Yara Yavelberg Academic Center.

She was a friend of the former Brazilian president Dilma Rousseff, who paid a tribute to her during the launch of Rousseff's candidacy.

== See also ==
- Em Busca de Iara, a 2013 documentary film
