= Tendência Leninista =

Leninist Tendency (Portuguese: Tendência Leninista) was a Brazilian organization which split from the Aliança Libertadora Nacional during its 1970-1971 exile, occurring along with other splits such at the Movimento de Libertação Popular (MOLIPO).
