= Carlos Lamarca =

Brazilian former military official (1937–1971)

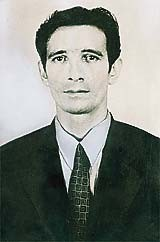
- Born: October 27, 1937; Rio de Janeiro, Federal District, Brazil
- Died: September 17, 1971 (aged 33); Ipupiara, Bahia, Brazil
- Military career
- Allegiance: Brazil
- Branch: Brazilian Army
- Service years: 1955–1969
- Rank: Colonel (Note: Initially ranked as Captain as of his desertion, Lamarca was posthumously promoted to Colonel by the Amnesty Commission in 2007.)
- Unit: United Nations Emergency Force (Suez Battalion)
- Conflicts: Suez Crisis

Carlos Lamarca (Portuguese: [ˈkaʁluz lɐ̃ˈmaʁkɐ, laˈmaʁkɐ]; October 27, 1937 – September 17, 1971) was a Brazilian Army Captain who deserted to join the armed struggle against the Brazilian military dictatorship. He was part of the Popular Revolutionary Vanguard (Vanguarda Popular Revolucionária – VPR) and became, along with Carlos Marighella, one of the leaders of the armed struggle. Such groups were armed chiefly for self-protection from the right-wing dictatorship that unleashed state terrorism against any who opposed their regime, including students, the clergy, and the children of those who called for democracy. The kidnappings by a few armed groups were conducted to free comrades suffering extremely brutal torture in Brazil's prisons.

== Early life ==
Carlos Lamarca was born on October 23, 1937, in the city of Rio de Janeiro. In 1955, he joined the Preparatory School of Military Cadets in Porto Alegre, Rio Grande do Sul. Two years later he was transferred to the Military Academy of Agulhas Negras in Resende, Rio de Janeiro, in which he graduated as one of the lower ranking cadets of his class, being the 46th placer out of a class of 57 cadets (1960).

Lamarca was a member of the United Nations Peacekeeping forces in Gaza during the Suez Crisis. He later returned to Brazil, where he supported the military coup. In 1967, he was promoted to Captain. In 1969, he deserted from the Army to join VPR, stealing in the process a truck full of military equipment with him.

The theft of the armaments was organized and carried out by him and by Sergeant Darcy Rodrigues, who supposedly convinced Lamarca to join VPR. Also participating in this operation were Corporal Mariani and Private Roberto Zanirato, later murdered under torture in DOI-CODI.

== Life in guerrilla warfare and death ==
Lamarca became one of the most active militants of the opposition to the 1964 regime. He participated in several operations, such as bank robberies and a guerrilla warfare camp in the extreme south of the state of São Paulo.

In 1970, the Army discovered the camp after the arrest of several VPR members in April of that same year. On May 10, 1970, he participated in the assassination of Military Police officer Alberto Mendes Júnior, who surrendered to Lamarca's group in order to prevent the death of two of his fellow soldiers, who were severely injured and needed medical assistance. Mendes was then executed by Lamarca with several blows to the head with the buttstock of a rifle.

In the same year, Lamarca commanded the kidnapping of the Swiss Ambassador Giovanni Enrico Bucher, with the purpose of exchanging him for political prisoners in Rio de Janeiro; in this kidnapping, the Federal Police Agent Hélio Carvalho de Araújo was shot to death by Lamarca. Araújo was in charge of the Swiss Ambassador's security.

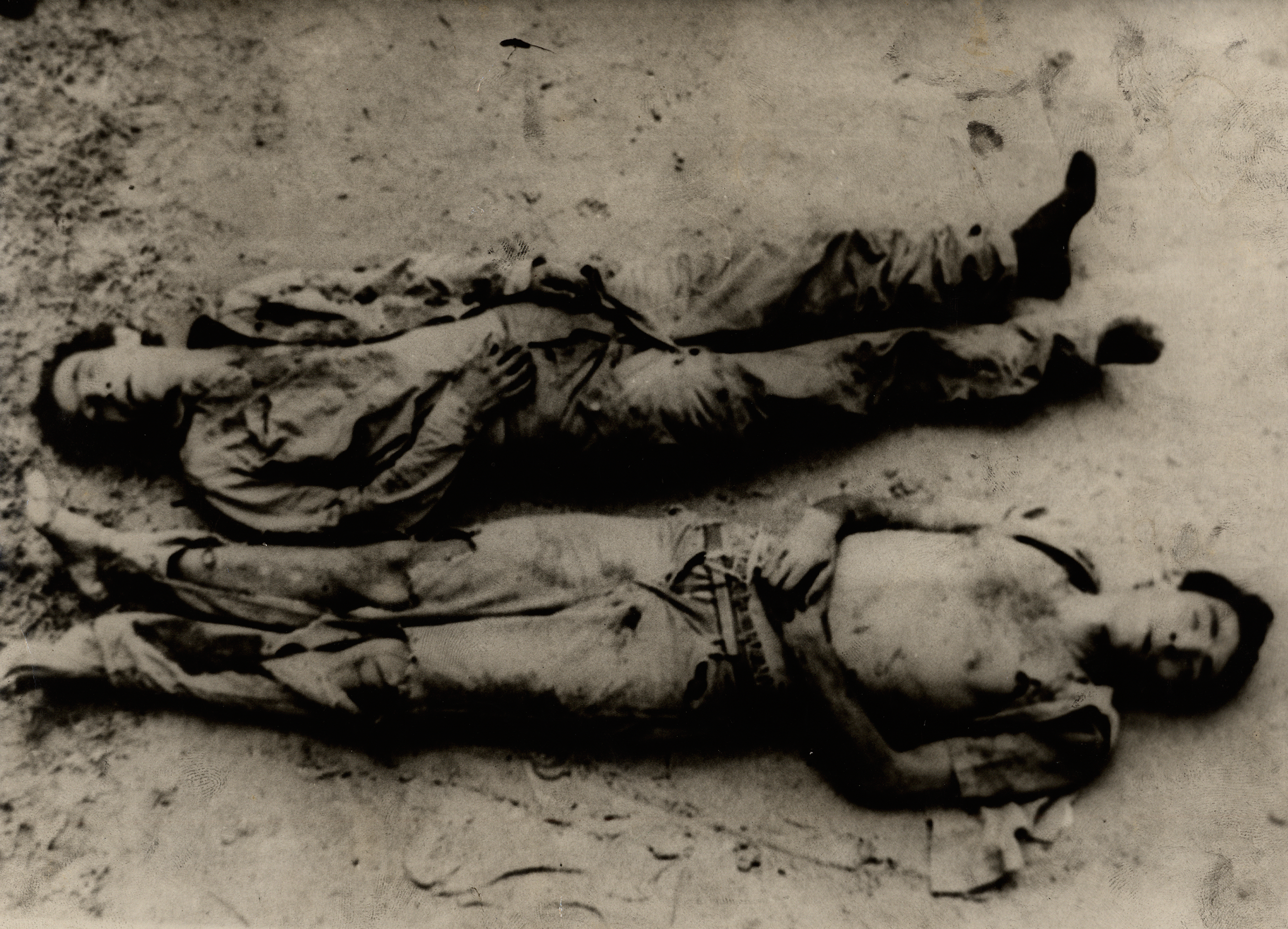
The bodies of Lamarca and Zequinha Barreto on the floor of the Salvador air base after their deaths in Pintada, a small town in the interior of Bahia.

Lamarca left VPR and joined the Revolutionary Movement 8th October. The new group sent him to Bahia, with the purpose of starting a Revolution in the countryside. On September 17, 1971, he was found by the Army in the small town of Pintada (currently Ipupiara), where he was killed while trying to resist arrest alongside VPR member José Campos Barreto (also known as Zequinha Barreto).

== Personal life ==
Lamarca was married to Maria Pavan, who was his foster sister, and had two children with her. His wife went into exile in Cuba because of the risks she was facing in Brazil. Lamarca also became romantically linked to Yara Yavelberg, a partner in his anti-dictatorship activities.

Yavelberg was killed two days before Lamarca, under suspicious circumstances in an apartment in Salvador, capital of Bahia.

== Amnesty and tributes ==
After several years and open opposition from the mass media, Lamarca's family successfully obtained indemnification for his death from the Amnesty Commission of the Ministry of Justice. His widow and children were granted 300,000 reais as a compensation for the time they lived in exile in Cuba. Lamarca's widow will also receive an allowance equivalent to a general's wage, according to the Amnesty Law of 1979.

The City Hall of Ipupiara built a public square in the location where Lamarca died. It is equipped with a playground, a fountain, a canteen, an amphitheatre and a statue of Lamarca. The Praça Capitão Carlos Lamarca (Captain Carlos Lamarca Public Square) was inaugurated on January 13, 2007. The city also paid a tribute to Lamarca by creating a law which added September 17, the day of his death, to the list of local holidays.

== Cultural references ==
Carlos Lamarca was interpreted by Paulo Betti in two films, both of them directed by Sérgio Rezende. The first was Lamarca's own biopic and the other was a movie about fashion designer Zuzu Angel Jones, whose Brazilian American son was a member of the Revolutionary Movement 8 October alongside Lamarca.

== See also ==
- Iara Iavelberg
- Armed struggle against the Brazilian military dictatorship
- Carlos Marighella
