= Fernando Gabeira =

Brazilian politician (born 1941)

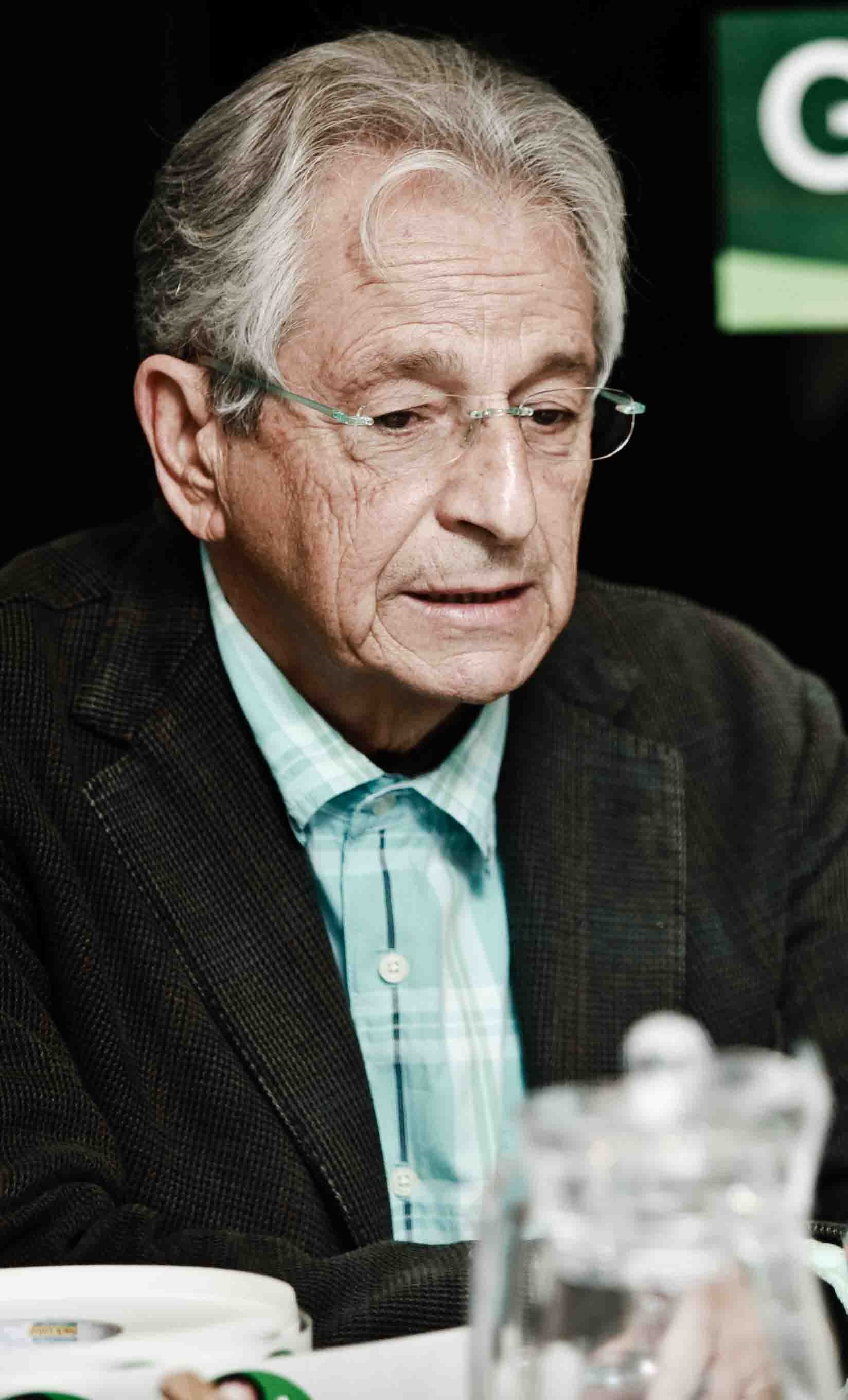

Member of the Chamber of Deputies
- In office 1 February 1995 – 1 February 2011
- Constituency: Rio de Janeiro

Personal details
- Born: Fernando Paulo Nagle Gabeira; 17 February 1941 (age 85) Juiz de Fora, Minas Gerais, Brazil
- Party: PV (1989–2002; 2003–present)
- Other political affiliations: PT (1986–1989; 2002–2003)
- Spouses: Yamê Reis (m. 1983; div. 1999) Neila Tavares (m. 2005)
- Children: 2, including Maya
- Relatives: Leda Nagle (cousin)
- Profession: Journalist
- Known for: Kidnapping of Charles Elbrik

Fernando Paulo Nagle Gabeira (Brazilian Portuguese: [feʁˈnɐ̃du ɡaˈbejɾɐ]; born 17 February 1941) is a Brazilian politician, author and journalist. He was a federal representative for the state of Rio de Janeiro from 1995 to 2011.

He is known for his 1979 book O Que É Isso, Companheiro? (loosely translated, What Was That, Man?). The book tells of the armed resistance to the military dictatorship in Brazil, and describes the 1969 kidnapping of American ambassador Charles Burke Elbrick, in which Gabeira took part as a member of MR8, an armed group fighting the military dictatorship then ruling Brazil.

The book was made into a movie in 1997, titled Four Days in September. The movie was nominated for many awards, including an Oscar as Best Foreign Language Film at the 70th Academy Awards. (Dutch film Karakter won the category.)

Because of his role in kidnapping its ambassador, the United States considered Gabeira to be a terrorist and refused him a visa to visit the United States. Over the years, Gabeira requested and was denied a visa three times. In 1998, he declared a visa denial would speak not of him, but as a U.S. act against Brazilian sovereignty. Folha de S.Paulo reported that Gabeira's lack of contrition may have contributed to the continuing refusals. Years later, in a 2009 Ragga interview, Gabeira called the kidnapping a mistake, and acknowledged positive views of the United States, saying Brazil had much it could learn from and admire about the U.S.

== Biography ==
Fernando Paulo Nagle Gabeira was born February 17, 1941, in Juiz de Fora, Minas Gerais, to Lebanese immigrant parents.

Gabeira started his journalism career young, contributing to magazines and newspapers in Juiz de Fora while still in high school. His interest in politics was evident from the start.

After a short stay in Belo Horizonte in the 1960s, Gabeira moved to Rio de Janeiro, where he worked for the Jornal do Brasil, a prominent carioca newspaper. With the military coup in April 1964, Gabeira got involved in the armed resistance to the new regime.

In 1969, the Ação Libertadora Nacional, the main armed leftwing organization in Brazil, and the MR8, to which Gabeira belonged, orchestrated the kidnapping of U.S. Ambassador Charles Burke Elbrick in Rio de Janeiro. Gabeira helped plan and execute the attack. To begin negotiations, the kidnappers demanded their manifesto be printed in local media, which was done. They also threatened to murder Elbrick if their demands were not met within 48 hours. Elbrick was released after 78 hours in exchange for the release of 15 political prisoners imprisoned by the military dictatorship, who were exiled to Mexico and then Cuba.

In 1970, Gabeira was jailed in São Paulo. He tried to escape but was shot in the attempt, striking his back and perforating a kidney as well as his stomach and liver. In June of that year, he and 39 others were released in exchange for the release of German ambassador Ehrenfried von Holleben, who had been kidnapped by terrorists just as Elbrick had been. The 40 were banned from Brazil and sent into exile.

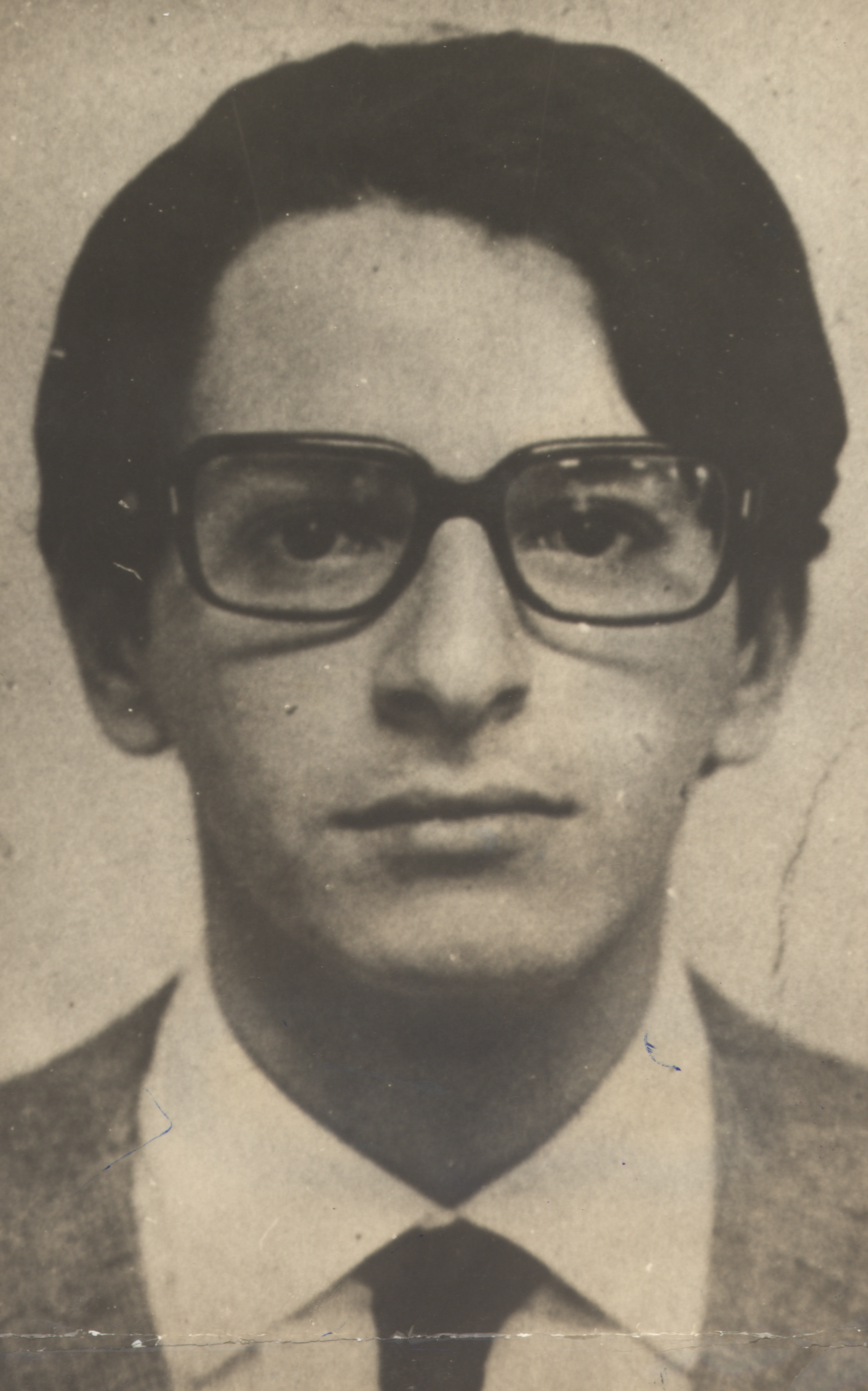
Fernando Gabeira, 1969.

During his exile in the 1970s, Gabeira lived in several countries including Chile, Sweden, and Italy. In Stockholm, where he spent most of his exile, he earned a degree in anthropology from Stockholm University and worked as a journalist as well as a train conductor.

After Brazil passed a general amnesty for those convicted of political crimes in 1979, Gabeira returned to Brazil. He worked as a journalist and writer, arguing for an end to the military dictatorship. In this period he wrote O Que É Isso, Companheiro?, describing the 1969 kidnapping of Ambassador Elbrick, as well as his role in it.

After 1985, Gabeira shifted his attention to minority rights and the environment. He was one of the founding members of the Green Party of Brazil, and repeatedly voiced his ideological support for progressive causes like the legalization of marijuana, marriage equality, and the legalization of abortion.

Gabeira left the Green Party in 2001 to join the Workers' Party. He remained affiliated with the Workers' Party for only two years, however, and later rejoined the Green Party in 2005. He ran for mayor of the city of Rio de Janeiro in 2008, but was narrowly defeated by Eduardo Paes in a runoff (49.3% – 50.7%). He lost a bid to become governor of the state of Rio de Janeiro in 2010.

=== The knitted swimsuit affair ===
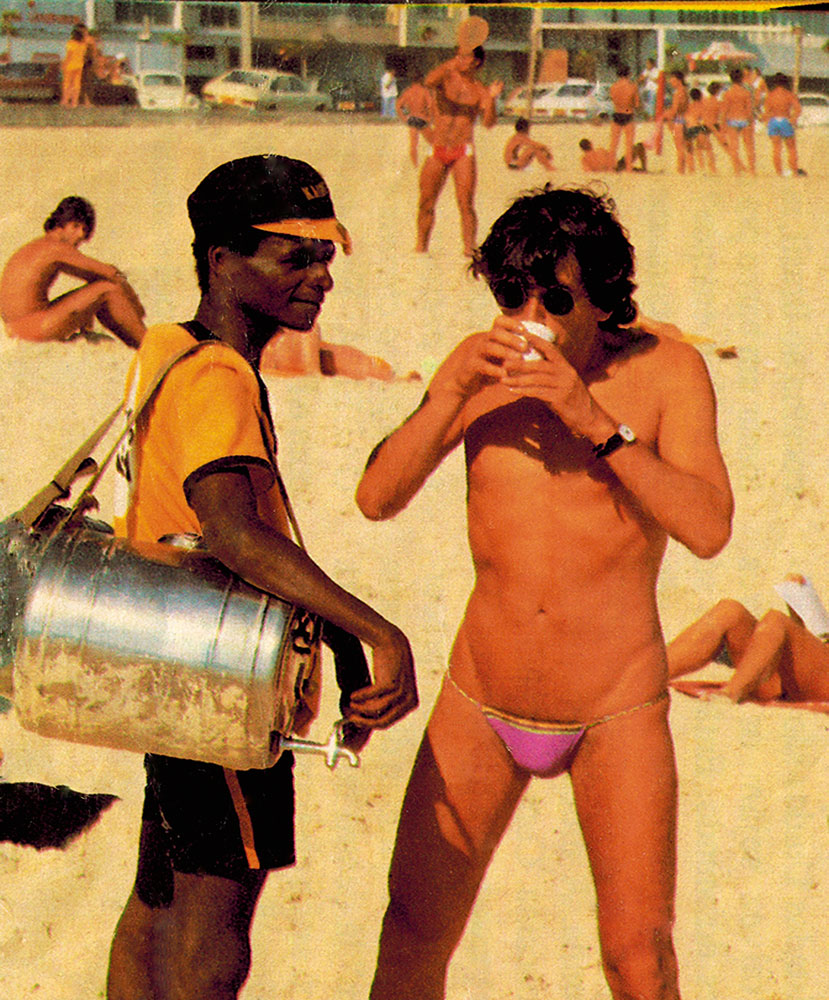
Gabeira's scandalous swimsuit

In 1980, after Gabeira's return from exile, a photo of him wearing a very small knitted swimsuit on Ipanema beach became a national scandal. Years later, Gabeira revealed that the suit was actually the bottom of one of his cousin Leda Nagle's bikinis.

== Literary career ==
In 1979, Gabeira wrote the book O Que É Isso, Companheiro?, about his participation in the armed struggle against the military regime in Brazil (1964–1985) and his subsequent exile in Europe. The book won the Jabuti Literature Prize in the biography/memoirs category in 1980 and was made into the film Four Days in September by filmmaker Bruno Barreto in 1997.

In 1980, he released O Crepúsculo do Macho, a continuation of O Que É Isso, Companheiro?.

In 1981, he launched Entradas e Bandeiras, a book in which he chronicles his return to Brazil and his abandonment of Marxist ideology, shifting to fight for issues such as ecology, pleasure, and sexual freedom. In the same year, he launched Hôte da utopia, in which he deepens his new ideological positioning.

In 1982, he launched Sinais de Vida on Planeta Minas, in which he chronicles feminist struggles against the conservative society of Brazil's Minas Gerais state, through the biographies of five mineiras, including Dona Beja and Ângela Diniz.

In 1987, he published Goiânia, Rua 57 — o Nuclear na Terra do Sol, in which he reported on a radiological accident that occurred in Goiânia.

In 2000, he launched A Maconha, in which he discussed the decriminalization of marijuana, its therapeutic functions, the societal role it plays, etc.

In 2006, he launched Navegação na Neblina, under a Creative Commons license, addressing the 2005 "Bloodsuckers Scandal," in which elected and governing officials stole money meant to buy ambulances.

In 2012, he released Onde Está Tudo Aquilo Agora.

In 2017, he released Democracia Tropical: Caderno de um Aprendiz, in which he recounted Dilma Rousseff's impeachment, as well as an overview of the prior thirty years of Brazilian democracy.

== Personal life ==
Gabeira is the son of Paulo Gabeira and Isabel Nagle, both Lebanese immigrants. His surname was adapted into Portuguese from the transliterations Jabara or Gebara (in Arabic: جبارة).

During his exile, Gabeira married his fellow militant Vera Sílvia Magalhães. They ended their relationship while living in Sweden.

After his return to Brazil, Gabeira married Yamê Reis, a fashion designer. He and Reis have two daughters, one of them being Maya Gabeira, a big wave surfer, who holds the world record for the largest wave ever surfed by a female. The couple divorced in 1999.

Currently, Gabeira is married to businesswoman Neila Tavares.
