= Em Busca de Iara =

2013 documentary film directed by Flavio Frederico

- Directed by: Flavio Frederico
- Written by: Mariana Pamplona
- Edited by: Vítor Alves Lopes; Flavio Frederico
- Music by: Jonas Tatit
- Production company: Kinoscópio
- Release dates: September 28, 2013 (Festival do Rio); March 27, 2014 (Brazil)
- Country: Brazil
- Language: Portuguese

Em Busca de Iara is a 2013 Brazilian documentary film directed by Flavio Frederico about the guerrilla Iara Iavelberg, a woman who participated in the armed struggle against the dictatorship in Brazil. With the research of documents, archive footage and interviews, the documentary reconstructs the life of Iara and disassembles the official version, which assigns her death to suicide.
