= Henning Albert Boilesen =

Danish business executive

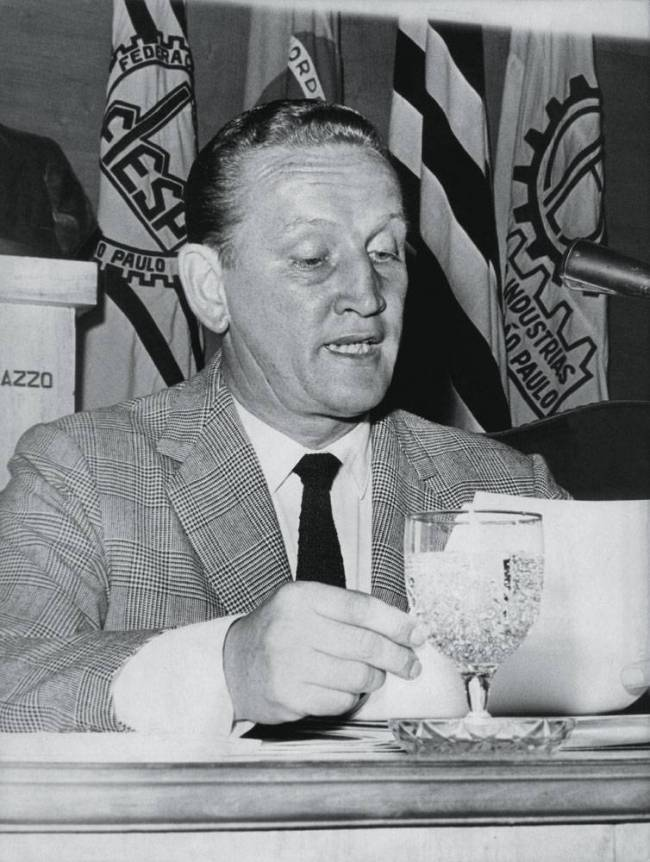
- Born: 15 February 1916; Copenhagen, Denmark
- Died: 15 April 1971 (aged 55); São Paulo, Brazil
- Occupation: Businessman

Henning Albert Boilesen (15 February 1916 – 15 April 1971) was a Danish business executive who lived in Brazil. He was the president of Ultragaz and founder of CIEE - Centro de Integração Empresa Escola.

He was a supporter of the governmental repression against leftist clandestine organizations during the Brazilian military dictatorship. Boilesen was killed by militants from Movimento Revolucionário Tiradentes (MRT) and Ação Libertadora Nacional (ALN) on April 15, 1971 in the city of São Paulo, in a planned reprisal for his involvement in the repression.

== Biography ==
Boilesen immigrated to Brazil in the 1930s. He participated in the founding of CIEE (Centro de Integração Empresa Escola) and was president of one of the Rotary Club’s sections.

He was one of the first executives to allegedly finance the Brazilian political-military apparatus through Operação Bandeirante (OBAN), which would become the forerunner for the modus operandi of the DOI-CODI (Destacamento de Operações de Informações-Coordenação de Defesa Interna).

Boilesen was killed with a shotgun by the militants of two leftist organizations, on the morning of April 15, 1971. He was killed on the Alameda Casa Branca, the same street on which one of the guerrilla leaders, Carlos Marighella, was killed two years earlier, in an operation led by Deputy Sérgio Fleury in São Paulo. The last shot was fired by Carlos Eugênio Paz, AKA “Clemente,” one of the commanders in the armed actions of the ALN (Aliança Libertadora Nacional).

The documentary Cidadão Boilesen, directed by Chaim Litewski, tells the Boilesens' life story. Interviews were given by Boilesen’s eldest son, his friends, colleagues, political opponents and personalities, such as the American Consul in São Paulo, and one of the militants who took part in Boilesen’s death. The film discusses Boilesen's habit of watching torture sessions, which was confirmed by testimonials given by militants from that time.
