= Ipupiara =

Municipality of Bahia, Brazil

Coordinates: 11°49′S 42°37′W

- Municipality
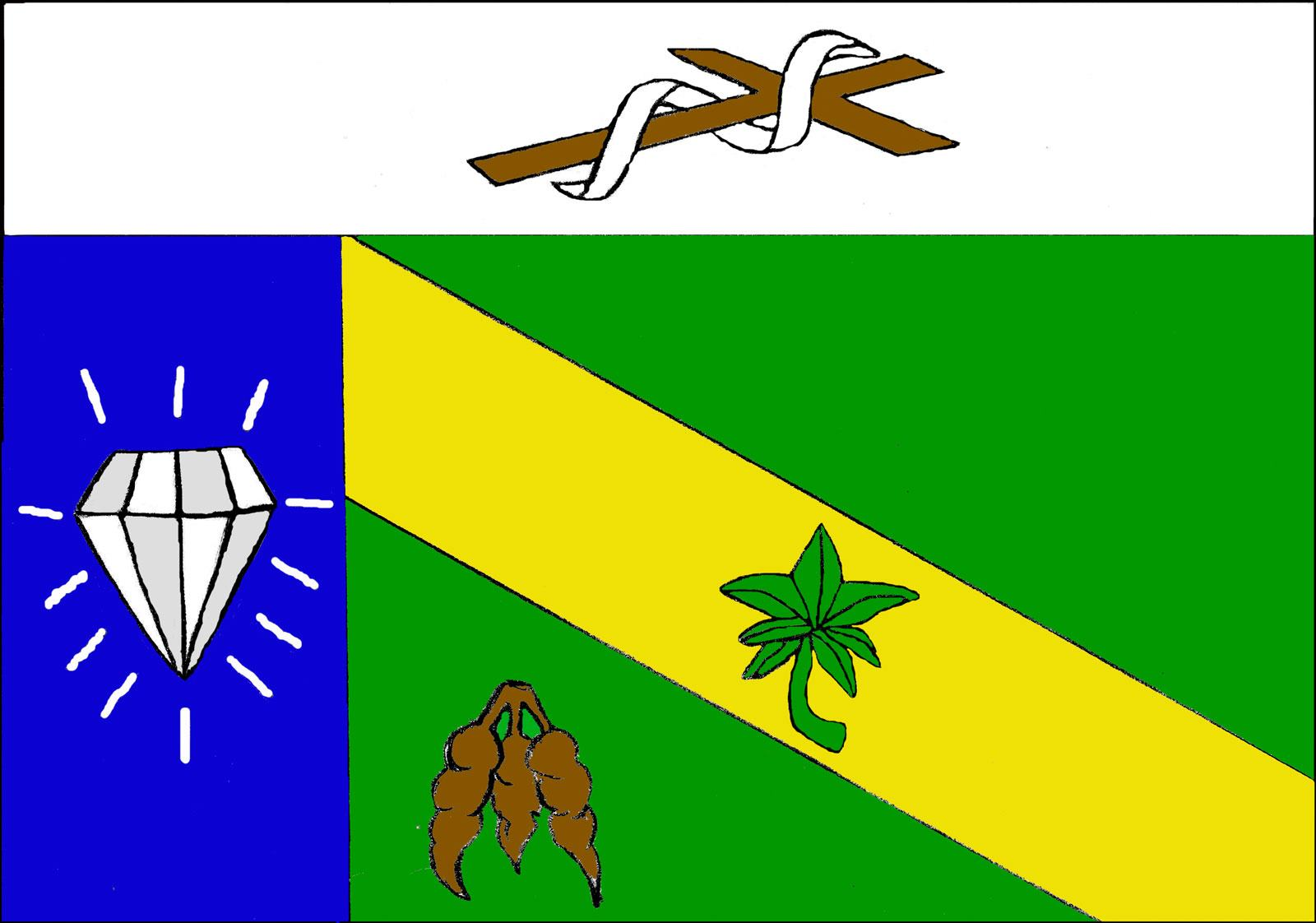
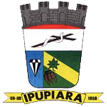
- Flag Coat of arms
- Interactive map of Ipupiara
- Country: Brazil
- Region: Nordeste
- State: Bahia

Population (2020)
  - Total: 9,911
- Time zone: UTC−3 (BRT)

Ipupiara is a municipality in the state of Bahia in the North-East region of Brazil.

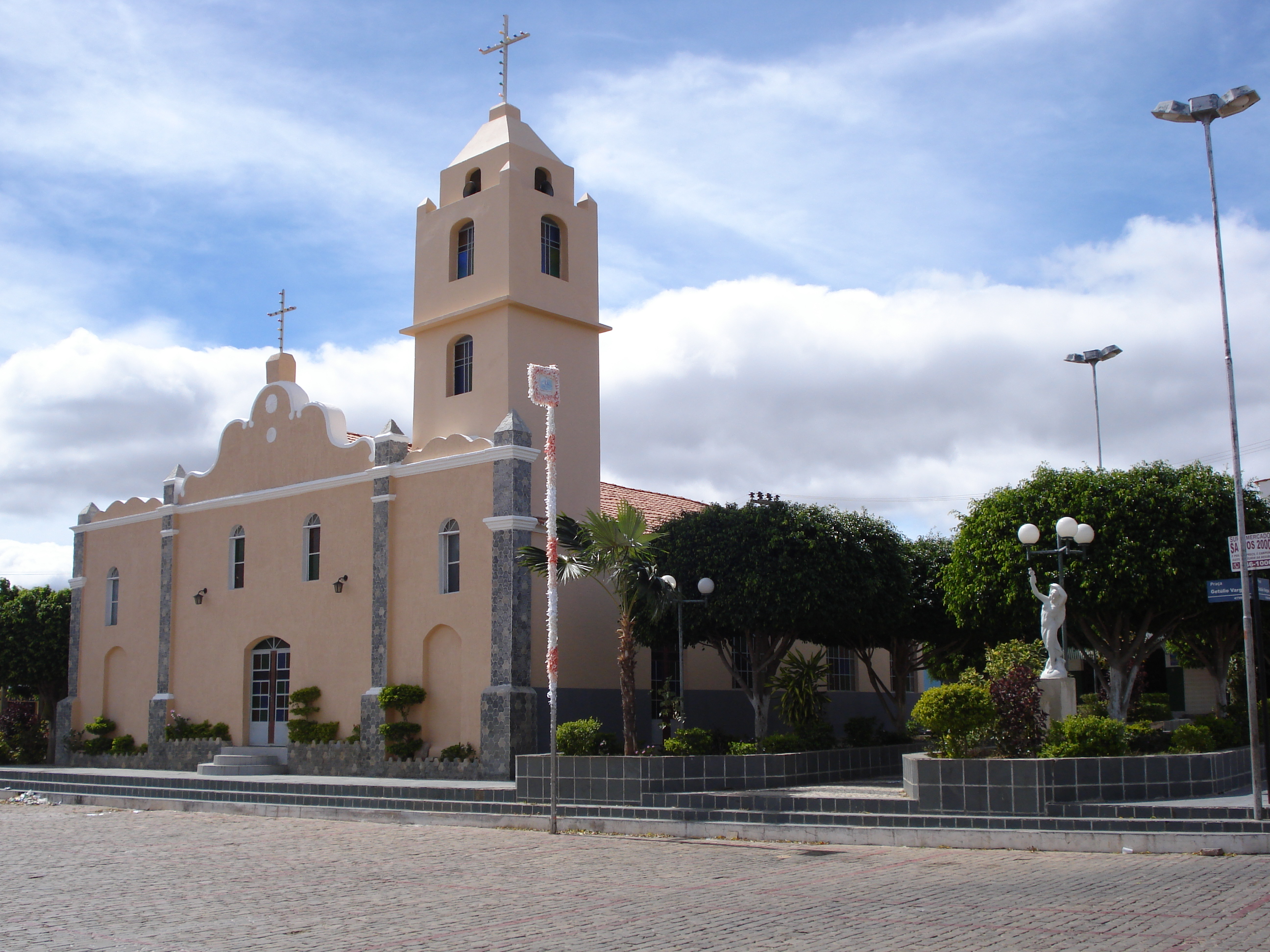
Church building in Ipupiara, Brazil

== See also ==
- List of municipalities in Bahia
