= Ação Libertadora Nacional =

Brazilian Marxist–Leninist guerilla group (1964–1974)

National Liberation Action
- Ação Libertadora Nacional
- Leaders: Carlos Marighella; Boanerges de Souza Massa
- Dates active: 1967–1974
- Split from: Brazilian Communist Party
- Country: Brazil
- Ideology: Communism; Marxism–Leninism; Guevarism; Foco theory; Left-wing nationalism; Revolutionary socialism
- Political position: Far-left

The National Liberation Action (Portuguese: Ação Libertadora Nacional, ALN) was a Marxist-Leninist urban guerrilla group in Brazil that opposed the Brazilian military dictatorship. The organization was founded by Carlos Marighella in 1967, following a split in the Brazilian Communist Party. It was the main left-wing armed organization in Brazil, standing out for the amount of militants it managed to attract. During its active years, the ALN was responsible for several notable acts, including bank robberies to finance guerilla warfare, the 1969 kidnapping of the United States Ambassador to Brazil, and taking other public figures hostage to be exchanged for jailed militants.

== History ==
=== Political context ===
After the Brazilian coup d'état in 1964, the instated military dictatorship repressed democratic political manifestation and frustrated the expectations of peaceful social transformation in Brazil, leading to the political radicalization of many left-wing militants. In May of that same year, Carlos Marighella was shot and arrested by agents of the Department of Political and Social Order (DOPS) inside a movie theater in Rio de Janeiro. By judicial decision, he was freed in the following year and decided to engage in armed resistance against the dictatorship. In his journal called The Brazilian Crisis, Marighella analyzes the national situation through the lens of class conflict and criticizes the peaceful party line of PCB, which at the time supported resistance by means of a general strike.

=== Formation ===
On the first of December 1966, Marighella wrote a letter renouncing his position at the Executive National Commission of PCB, in which he argues that "it's preferable to renounce a formal coexistence rather than live in shock with my own conscience". Because of these political differences, he led, alongside Joaquim Câmara Ferreira, the formation of the "São Paulo Dissidence", a wing of the PCB which advocated armed struggle. After the conference of the Latin American Solidarity Organization (OLAS) in Havana in 1967, the dissidents were finally expelled from PCB, resulting in the creation of the ALN.

=== Activity ===
Since its formation, the ALN acted several armed interventions in order to expropriate guns and money in order to better structure their guerilla. During this phase, several manifestos and pamphlets aiming to explain to the people the objectives of the military operations were produced by the group. Most of these pamphlets were spread in the same places where the acts were carried out. In one of these pamphlets from 1969, the ALN explains the necessity of these acts to create infrastructure and rejects the Leninist concept of democratic centralism, since the organization defined itself as "guerilla soldiers, terrorists and robbers, and not men who depend on the vote of other revolutionaries or whoever else to act on the duty to make the revolution". The political objective of such a procedure was to justify the robberies as not common criminals, but ones with a clear political objective, since by justifying those acts the militants sought to build a narrative in which they denounced the atrocities carried out by the dictatorship and argued their decision to take part in armed resistance. This tactic is showcased by the 1968 manifesto called "To the people of Brazil":

"The guerilla attacks all of those who oppress or collaborate with the regime's oppresion. [It] expropriates the big capitalists, attacks the police taking its weapons, justice agents and spies from the police, kidnaps public personalities to exchange them for jailed revolutionaries. The guerilla takes from the enemy all that is useful to the struggle of our people."

=== Kidnappings ===
Out of the four kidnappings of ambassadors in the history of Brazil, the ALN took part in two. The first one, in conjunction with the MR-8, was of the American ambassador Charles Burke Elbrick, in September 1969, which resulted in the liberation of 15 political prisoners and attracted significant media attention to the group. The second kidnapping was of the German ambassador Ehrefried Von Holleben, which resulted in the release of 44 political prisoners.

=== Repression ===
Marighella was shot down in an ambush led by coroner Sérgio Paranhos Fleury, one of the main torturers of the dictatorship, on the 4th of November 1969, in the Casa Branca avenue in São Paulo. Joaquim Câmara Ferreira ("Old man" or "Toledo"), a journalist and ex-member of the PCB since the 1940s, led the ALN from then until his death, on 23 October 1970, when he was reported by José Silva Tavares, "Severino", who was tortured after being arrested. Joaquim Câmara was tortured to death by Fleury and members of his team.

In 1971, Eduardo Collen Leite (codename Bacuri), an important member of the ALN, was arrested by Fleury's team and died after 109 days of confinement and torture. In 1972, a group of dissidents who had gone through guerilla training in Cuba created the Popular Liberation Movement (Molipo). Most of its frontline militants were killed by 1974, and afterwards the ALN only barely survived the siege by the military repression. The last military commander of the ALN after Marighella's death was Carlos Eugênio Paz, known by his nom de guerre Clemente during the guerilla. Being the most wanted man by the repression, he exiled in France in 1973 and lived there until 1981. He was also one of the few guerilla members who survived without having ever been imprisoned or tortured. He was one of the last Brazilians to receive amnesty, in May 1982. Until October 2009, he had published the books On the trail of the ALN and Travel to the Armed Struggle, and died on 29 June 2019.

=== Dissidencies ===
In 1972 two dissident factions, which had a shorter lifespan and few militants, split from the ALN: the Popular Liberation Movement (Molipo) and the Leninist Tendency (TL). Molipo went defunct after many of its members were imprisoned, tortured, or killed.
