= Vitae Foundation =

- Named after: Vitae, Latin for "lives"
- Formation: 1977
- Founder: Carl Landwehr
- Founded at: Jefferson City, Missouri
- Type: Nonprofit
- Tax ID no.: 43-1138252 (EIN)
- Legal status: Foundation
- Purpose: Anti-abortion support
- Headquarters: 1731 Southridge Drive, Suite D, Jefferson City Missouri 65109
- Location: Jefferson City, Missouri, United States
- Services: Messaging research, development, and dissemination
- Fields: Advertising research
- Official language: English
- President: Brandy Meeks
- Chief Operating Officer: Debbie Stokes
- Board of directors: Doug A. Bax, Larry M. Rohrbach, Kyle Menges, Jason Imlay, John Bruchalski, Melissa Ohden, John Sinclair
- Revenue: $3,398,540 (fiscal year 2022)
- Expenses: $3,447,608 (fiscal year 2022)
- Funding: Individual donations, fundraising events, grants
- Staff: 32 (fiscal year 2022)
- Website: vitaefoundation.org

The Vitae Foundation is an American 501(c)(3) nonprofit organization associated with the anti-abortion movement.

The group focuses on advertising research, developing more effective messaging, and communicating the results of this research to other anti-abortion organizations and persons, such as doctors and pastors, to provide them with more effective ways to persuade undecided women to forgo abortion.

== Funding ==
In addition to individual donations, the Foundation receives some support from organizations. In fiscal year 2022 its largest grantor was the Schwab Charitable Fund, giving $197,750. It also runs a number of fundraising events, such as golf tournaments and dinners. The Foundation hosts an annual convention in Jefferson City.

For 2022, the Charity Navigator gave Vitae Foundation a score of 99%, indicating an extremely high level of fiscal soundness and accountability, transparency, and leadership competence (although in the preceding six years it had scored in the 80-89% range).

== History ==
According to the organization, Carl Landwehr led the formation of what is now the Vitae Foundation in 1977.

He came to define his mission with the question "How would you market the product of life if that was your business?" In 1993 Landwehr commissioned Charles Kenny of The Right Brain People to develop anti-abortion messaging that was not politically charged, confrontational, nor accusatory. Kenny helped develop a more low-key approach while echoing female empowerment themes from anti-abortion feminism.

Starting in 2015, Vitae Foundation ads have been run in radio broadcasts of baseball games of the Kansas City Royals on KCSP, and the Foundation also has signs at their ballpark, Kauffman Stadium. A former Royals all-star, employed by the team, voiced the Vitae Foundation radio ads. The Royals also honored a seventh-grade student who won an essay contest run by the Foundation (with cooperation from the Archdiocese of Kansas City) on the subject of "Encouraging a Culture of Life" by inviting them to throw the honorary first pitch at a 2017 game. This prompted the abortion-rights organization UltraViolet to initiate an online petition demanding the Royals stop carrying Vitae Foundation messages and flew a banner, decrying the Royals' relationship with the Foundation, over the stadium during a game.

== Notes ==
1. Or 1974. 1977 was the Foundation's IRS ruling year, the year the IRS (Internal Revenue Service) recognized the Foundation as an organized non-taxable entity able to hire employees, which generally signifies that the non-profit organization has become a proper operating business.
