= 8th October Revolutionary Movement =

Brazilian communist group

8 October Revolutionary Movement
- Movimento Revolucionário 8 de Outubro
- Founder: Unknown
- Founded: 1964
- Dates active: 1964–1985 (urban guerrilla group); 1985–2009 (political party); 2009–present (activist group)
- Country: Brazil
- Ideology: Marxism-Leninism; Revolutionary socialism
- Political position: Far-left
- Status: Active

8th October Revolutionary Movement (Portuguese: Movimento Revolucionário 8 de Outubro, MR8) was a Marxist political organization that took part in armed struggle against the military dictatorship in Brazil. It was formed in 1964 among college students in the city of Niterói, in the state of Rio de Janeiro, originally being called Rio de Janeiro Dissidence (DI-RJ). It was later renamed in memory of the day in which Ernesto "Che" Guevara was captured in Bolivia, on 8 October 1967.

Today it takes part in popular political movements and publishes the newspaper Hora do Povo. It is also responsible for the Free Fatherland Party, founded in 2009 and integrated into the Communist Party of Brazil in 2019.

== History ==
Resulting from a split by college students from the Brazilian Communist Party, the DI-RJ (later renamed MR-8 in 1967) acted within student's movements, as well as in early armed resistance, in 1968. Broken up by the Brazilian army in early 1969, the remaining survivors who were still free joined the members of the Communist Dissidence of Guanabara (DI-GB), active since 1966 in political demonstrations under the leadership of Vladimir Palmeira, to form a "new" MR-8. The organization, by then already acting as an urban guerrilla, became nationally and internationally known through its central role in the kidnapping of the American ambassador in Brazil Charles Burke Elbrick, in September 1969. The kidnapping was a joint action with the National Liberation Action (ALN), from São Paulo, and was done primarily to negotiate the freedom of leader student activist Vladimir Palmeira, jailed since 1968.

On the trail of the ambassador's kidnapping, some members of the group were killed for not surrendering and resisting imminent arrest. Even so, in the following years, armed operations by MR-8 such as bank robberies followed in Rio de Janeiro. In 1971, after the near complete disintegration of the People's Revolutionary Vanguard (VPR), Carlos Lamarca, an ex-capitain who lead the VPR, joined the MR-8. His then partner, Iara Iavelberg, was already a militant within MR-8. Carlos Lamarca, however, was killed in the countryside of Bahia, following the death of Iara in Salvador.

Most of the militants exiled to Chile in 1972, and later on the group was restructured under a different orientation. The preference for armed action gave place to peaceful political action, and MR8 began acting within the MDB, having Orestes Quercia as their main leader. The group began publishing their Hora do Povo newspaper.

Besides Carlos Lamarca and Iara Iavelberg, Fernando Gabeira, Franklin Martins, Cid Benjamin, Cláudio Torres da Silva, Vera Silvia Magalhães (all of those participants in the kidnapping of Elbrick), César Benjamin, Stuart Angel Jones, Daniel Aarão Reis Filho, José Roberto Spiegner, Miguel Ferreira da Costa, João Lopes Salgado, Reinaldo Silveira Pimenta, Félix Escobar Sobrinho, Marilene Villas-Boas Pinto, Lucas Gregorio, Márcia Ferreira da Costa, Franklin de Mattos, Alfredo Iser, João Manoel Fernandes and others acted in MR-8, and many of them were killed in the fight against the military dictatorship. According to the National Truth Commission, between 1946 and 1988, 434 opponents of the military regime were either killed or "disappeared", the vast majority of them between 1964 and 1988.

The MR-8 is still active today, working with several political and social movements, for example as a current within MDB and, formerly, PSDB, as well as with trade unions and student's movements, in which several of their militants were part of different directories of UNE. Its youth wing is 8 October Revolutionary Youth. A significant number of its members founded the Free Fatherland Party in 2009.

== See also ==
- Tiradentes Revolutionary Movement (1969–1971)
