= Charles Burke Elbrick =

American diplomat (1908–1983)

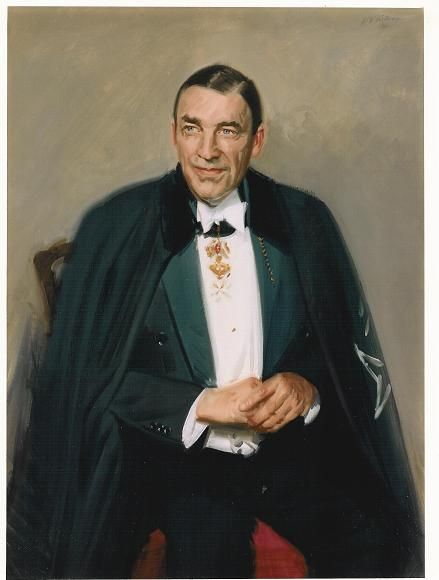
- Portrait of Elbrick by Andrew Festing

37th United States Ambassador to Brazil
- In office July 14, 1969 – May 7, 1970
- President: Richard Nixon
- Preceded by: John W. Tuthill
- Succeeded by: William M. Rountree

14th United States Ambassador to Yugoslavia
- In office March 17, 1964 – April 28, 1969
- President: Lyndon B. Johnson; Richard Nixon
- Preceded by: George F. Kennan
- Succeeded by: William K. Leonhart

53rd United States Ambassador to Portugal
- In office January 13, 1959 – August 31, 1963
- President: Dwight D. Eisenhower; John F. Kennedy
- Preceded by: James C. H. Bonbright
- Succeeded by: George W. Anderson, Jr.

3rd Assistant Secretary of State for European Affairs
- In office February 14, 1957 – November 16, 1958
- Preceded by: Livingston T. Merchant
- Succeeded by: Livingston T. Merchant

Personal details
- Born: March 25, 1908 Louisville, Kentucky, U.S.
- Died: April 12, 1983 (aged 75) Washington, D.C., U.S.
- Profession: Diplomat

Charles Burke Elbrick (March 25, 1908 – April 12, 1983) was an American diplomat and career foreign service officer. During his career, he served three ambassadorships: in Portugal, Yugoslavia and Brazil, in addition to numerous minor postings.

Elbrick spoke Portuguese, Spanish, French and German, and was regarded as an expert on Iberia and Eastern Europe after World War II.

== Early life and education ==
Elbrick was born in Louisville, Kentucky, the son of Charles Elbrick and his Irish wife Lillian Burke, and raised as a Roman Catholic. Transferring after a first year at the University of Notre Dame, he graduated with a Bachelor of Arts degree from Williams College in 1929, narrowly missing selection for a Rhodes Scholarship. He had aimed to begin a career in publishing in New York, but the Wall Street crash of 1929 persuaded him to work instead for the US Government. He therefore studied languages to prepare for a career with the United States Department of State.

== Foreign service career ==
Commissioned into the United States Foreign Service in 1931, Elbrick was initially appointed Vice Consul in Panama, and then Southampton, England. He next served as Third Secretary at Port-au-Prince, Haiti, before transferring in that rank to Warsaw, Poland in 1937. In 1939, Elbrick followed the Polish government into exile after the invasion by the German Nazi army. While leaving Warsaw in convoy, the diplomatic convoy was strafed by German planes, and Elbrick had to leap to cover in a roadside ditch. He joined the Polish government-in-exile at Angers, France. When the German blitzkrieg smashed into France in the spring of 1940, Elbrick had to flee again, this time to Spain. He spent most of World War II as an embassy official in Lisbon, and as consul in Tangier. During this time he added Portuguese to his other foreign languages, which were German, French and Spanish.

After the war, Elbrick returned to Poland in June 1945 to reopen the US Embassy, then went to the State Department as assistant chief of the Division of East European Affairs. He served as Counselor at the U.S. Embassy in Havana from 1949 to 1951. In 1951 and 1952, he served respectively as Counselor of the US Embassy in London and then in Paris and as a delegate to the North Atlantic Council.

From 1953 to 1957 Elbrick was deputy assistant secretary of State for European affairs, and was promoted to Assistant Secretary of State for European and Eurasian Affairs in 1957. Thereafter, Ambassador Elbrick was variously the representative of the United States to Portugal (1958), Yugoslavia (1964), and Brazil (1969).

In August 1968, when Soviet-led forces invaded Czechoslovakia, Elbrick, then Ambassador in Belgrade, was summoned by Marshal Tito and asked about United States policy toward Yugoslavia. "The same as always", Elbrick said. "To support Yugoslav independence and integrity. Do you need any help?" "Not now", said Tito, thanking Ambassador Elbrick for inquiring.

=== 1969 kidnapping in Brazil ===
A year later, while stationed in Brazil, Elbrick was kidnapped from a road-block on September 4, 1969, and held for 78 hours by the 8th October Revolutionary Movement (MR-8) in Rio de Janeiro. His driver was released unharmed with a note demanding the release of 15 unnamed political prisoners and the publication of a three-page manifesto from the 8th October Revolutionary Movement. If the demands were not met within 48 hours, MR-8 threatened to carry out 'revolutionary justice', by executing Elbrick. He was released in exchange for the government's release of fifteen political prisoners. The kidnapping occurred as a means to bring media attention to the repression, imprisonment and torture of Brazilian citizens by the Brazilian military regime. Elbrick remarked, "Being an ambassador is not always a bed of roses."

In 1969, Elbrick was honored by President Richard Nixon with the rank of Career Ambassador, the highest in the Foreign Service, in recognition of especially distinguished service over a sustained period. Following his retirement in 1973, Elbrick was awarded the Foreign Service Cup by his fellow Foreign Service officers. He resided in Washington, DC, and Gilbertsville, New York. Elbrick received an honorary doctorate from Hartwick College in Oneonta, New York.

== Family ==
Elbrick married Elvira Lindsay Johnson (1910–1990) at St. Matthew's Cathedral, Washington DC, on July 27, 1932. Elvira was the daughter of Hannah Cox Harris (descendant of Thomas Harris, addressee of the Rhode Island Royal Charter of 1663), and Alfred Wilkinson Johnson, later a Vice Admiral in the US Navy. Elvira's mother was a direct descendant of Abijah Gilbert, the founder of Gilbertsville, New York (1787). Her father was the son of Commodore Philip Carrigan Johnson, by her namesake Elvira Lindsay Acevedo of Talcahuano (Chile), and nephew of celebrated painter and co-founder of the Metropolitan Museum, Eastman Johnson.

Elbrick and Elvira had two children: Alfred (born 1938) and Valerie (born 1942). Elbrick was survived by his wife, children, and six grandchildren: Tristan, Sophie, Alexia, and Xanthe, and brothers Burke and Nicholas Hanlon.

== Honors ==
Elbrick was appointed a Knight Grand Cross of the Order of Prince Henry. He was knighted in the Sovereign Military and Hospitaller Order of St. John of Jerusalem of Rhodes and of Malta (Sovereign Military Order of Malta) by the Prince and Grand Master, Fra' Angelo de Mojana di Cologna. He was also knighted in the Equestrian Order of the Holy Sepulchre (Order of the Holy Sepulchre) by the Grand Master Maximilian, Cardinal de Furstenberg.

Elbrick's honors and decorations included:

Knight Grand Cross of the Order of Prince Henry	(Portugal)
Knight of the Order of Malta	Sovereign Military Order of Malta
Knight of the Holy Sepulchre	Holy See

== Representation in popular culture ==
- The events of Ambassador Elbrick's abduction in Brazil were recounted by Fernando Gabeira in his 1979 memoir, O Que É Isso Companheiro? (in English: What's This, Comrade?). The former member of revolutionary cell MR-8 had become a journalist and elected congressman in Brazil's Green Party.
- The 1997 Brazilian film, Four Days in September, was based on Gabeira's memoir. It was directed by Bruno Barreto, featuring Alan Arkin as Ambassador Elbrick, with Pedro Cardoso and Fisher Stevens.

== Death ==
Elbrick died April 15, 1983, aged 75, at Georgetown University Hospital in Washington, D.C. His funeral was held at St. Matthew's Cathedral, Washington D.C. His obituary in The New York Times described him as "a tall, slender man of suave demeanor in exquisite suits...[who]...showed dash and bravery in moments of crisis". The Washington Post recorded that "He was tall, meticulously dressed and soft-spoken. Colleagues said he looked like a diplomat, but one of them, the late ambassador James W. Riddleberger, was quick to add, [Elbrick] has plenty of guts. He is a very sturdy fellow."

== Notes ==
Government offices
Preceded by Livingston T. Merchant	Assistant Secretary of State for European Affairs; February 14, 1957 – November 16, 1958	Succeeded by Livingston T. Merchant
Diplomatic posts
Preceded by James C. H. Bonbright	United States Ambassador to Portugal; 1959–1963	Succeeded by George W. Anderson, Jr.
Preceded by John W. Tuthill	United States Ambassador to Brazil; 1969–1970	Succeeded by William M. Rountree
