= Antônio Calloni =

Brazilian actor (born 1961)

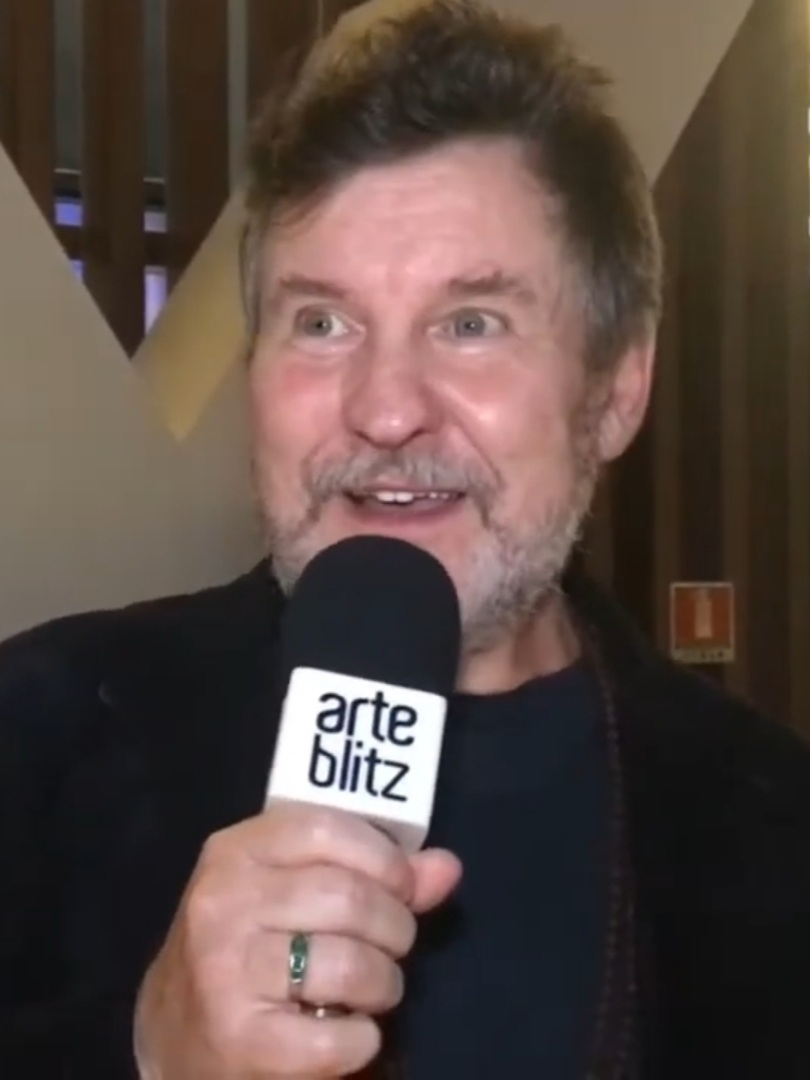
- Calloni in 2022
- Born: Egízio Antônio Calloni; 6 December 1961 (age 64); São Paulo, SP, Brazil
- Occupations: Actor; Poet; Singer; Writer; Producer; Voice actor
- Spouse: Ilse Rodrigues Garro (m. 1993)
- Children: 1
- Parent: Ennio Calloni
- Website: https://www.antoniocalloni.com/

Egízio Antônio Calloni (born 6 December 1961) is a Brazilian actor, best known for Os Dias Eram Assim (2017), Dois Irmãos (2017), Brazilian Western (2013) and he also dubbed Garfield in the first film and the second film.

== Filmography ==
=== Television ===
Year	Title	Role	Notes
1986	Anos Dourados	Claudionor Guedes "Clau-Clau"	
1986	Cida, a Gata Roqueira		Musical
1986	Hipertensão	Camilo Fratello	
1987	Bambolê	Augusto Lima "Pronto"	
1988	TV Pirata	Caveira	
1989	O Salvador da Pátria	Tomás Siqueira	
1990	Brasileiras e Brasileiros	Plínio Marcondes	
1991	O Dono do Mundo	William Camargo	
1992	Deus Nos Acuda	Promotor Braga	
1993	Olho no Olho	Bóris Pasternak	
1993	Contos de Verão	Thalles Pereira Leite	
1993	Terça Nobre	Porfírio Lafayete	Episode: "O Alienista"
1994	Terça Nobre		Episode: "Lúcia McCartney"
1994	74.5: Uma Onda no Ar	Delegado Mariano Peixoto	
1995	Decadência	Cleto	
1995	Você Decide	Arlindo / George	Episodes: "Perigo Ambulante" "O Sacrifício"
1996	Malhação de Verão	Leon Telles Correia	
1996	Sai de Baixo	Armando	Episode: "É Osso Aí, Bicho"
1996	A Vida como Ela É...	Various characters	
1997	Zazá	Milton Dumont	
1997	Você Decide	Agnaldo	Episode: "Norma"
1997	A Justiceira	Ezequiel Gomes	Episode: "Viver por Viver"
1998	Mulher	Francisco Menezes	Episode: "A Decisão Final"
1998	Era uma Vez...	Manuel Dionísio "Maneco"	
1999	Chiquinha Gonzaga	Lopes Trovão	
1999	Suave Veneno	Hanif Abdala	
1999	Você Decide	Guilherme	Episode: "É Assim se Lhe Parece"
1999	Terra Nostra	Bartolo Migliavacca	
2001	Os Maias	Palma Cavalão	
2001	Brava Gente	São Pedro	Episode: "Arioswaldo e Sua Mãe Centenária"
2001	O Clone	Mohamed Rachid	
2002	Os Normais	Heraldo	Episode: "Sensações Normais"
2002	Sítio do Picapau Amarelo	Conde Xis Parmesan	Episode: "O Menino Bruxo"
2004	Um Só Coração	Assis Chateaubriand	
2004	Começar de Novo	Olavo Bilac Borges "Olavinho"	
2005	A Grande Família	Aníbal	Episode: "Eu, Eu Mesma e Lineu"
2005	Linha Direta	Zé Arigó	Episode: "Zé Arigó"
2005	Retrato Falado	Adeneir	Episode: "25 September"
2006	JK	Augusto Frederico Schmidt	
2006	Páginas da Vida	Gustavo Pinheiro de Sousa	Episode: "10 July–22 August"
2007	Amazônia, de Galvez a Chico Mendes	Padre José Pereira	
2007	Linha Direta	Sérgio Fleury	Episode: "Cabo Anselmo"
2007	Casos e Acasos	Ernesto	Episode: "Piloto"
2008	Beleza Pura	Eduardo Passos	
2009	A Grande Família	Serjão	Episode: "O Grande Rolo"
2009	Caminho das Índias	César Gallo Goulart	
2010	Escrito nas Estrelas	Vicente de Miranda / Esteban López	
2011	O Astro	Natalino "Natal" Pimentel	
2012	Salve Jorge	Mustafá Ayata	
2013	Além do Horizonte	Luís Carlos Barcelos "L.C."	
2014	Eu Que Amo Tanto	Osório	Episode: "Zezé"
2016	Justiça	Antenor Ferraz	
2017	Dois Irmãos	Young Halim	
2017	Os Dias Eram Assim	Arnaldo Sampaio Pereira	Episodes: "17 April–26 May"
2018	O Sétimo Guardião	Egídio Arantes	Episodes: "12–30 November"
2018	Assédio	Roger Sadala	
2019	Tá no Ar: a TV na TV	Himself	Episode: "29 January"
2019	Éramos Seis	Júlio Abílio de Lemos	Episodes: "30 September–3 December"
2022	Além da Ilusão	Matias Tapajós	
2023	Vai na Fé	Stuart Phillips / Aristides Formiga	Episodes: "22 June–11 July"
2024	Renascer	Coronel Belarmino Ferreira	Episodes: "22–30 January"
2026	Coração Acelerado	Walmir Macedo	

=== Cinema ===
Year	Title	Role	Notes
1992	Modernismo: Os Anos 20	Oswald de Andrade	Short-film
1994	O Efeito Ilha	Armando Torres	
1995	16060	Vittorio	
1995	Esperando Roque	Teo	Short-film
1996	Sambólico	Rudi	Short-film
1997	Lápide	Marido	Short-film
1997	Happy Hours	Miranda	Short-film
1998	Policarpo Quaresma, Herói do Brasil	Genelício	
1999	Outras Estórias	Sorôco	
1999	Ano Novo	Fábio	Short-film
2002	A Paixão de Jacobina	Pastor Boeber	
2002	Poeta de Sete Faces		Documentary
2003	Pracinha	Homem	Short-film
2004	Garfield: The Movie	Garfield	Brazilian dubbed voice
2006	Garfield: A Tail of Two Kitties	Garfield	Brazilian dubbed voice
2006	Anjos do Sol	Saraiva	
2006	O Passageiro - Segredos de Adulto	Mauro Brandão	
2007	Os Porralokinhas	Beto	
2008	Dias e Noites	Pedro Ramão	
2010	O Primata Poliglota	Fausto	Short-film
2013	Brazilian Western	Marco Aurélio	
2014	Chess Game	Senator Franco	
2017	Polícia Federal: A Lei É para Todos	Delegado Ivan Romano	
2022	Minha Família Perfeita	Ícaro	
