= Coração Acelerado =

Brazilian telenovela

- Genre: Telenovela
- Created by: Izabel de Oliveira; Maria Helena Nascimento
- Written by: Dino Cantelli; Flávia Bessone; Daisy Chaves; Fabrício Santiago; Isabel Muniz
- Directed by: Carlos Araújo
- Starring: Isadora Cruz; Filipe Bragança; Isabelle Drummond; Gabz; Letícia Spiller; Leandra Leal; Daniel de Oliveira; Thomás Aquino
- Opening theme: "Olha Onde Eu Tô" by Ana Castela
- Country of origin: Brazil
- Original language: Portuguese
- No. of seasons: 1
- No. of episodes: 177

Production
- Production company: Estúdios Globo

Original release
- Network: TV Globo
- Release: 12 January – 14 August 2026

Coração Acelerado (English: Racing Heart) is a Brazilian telenovela created by Izabel de Oliveira and Maria Helena Nascimento. It aired on TV Globo from 12 January 2026 to 14 August 2026. The telenovela stars Isadora Cruz, Filipe Bragança, Isabelle Drummond, Gabz, Letícia Spiller, Leandra Leal, Daniel de Oliveira and Thomás Aquino.

== Plot ==
Young singer João Raul, idol of sertanejo universitário music and known as "Mozão do Brasil", breaks the internet with a social media post: "Where is the girl from my past?" The question comes with the revelation that his career had an inspiring muse, a girl he met at a talent show when he was 12 years old in Bom Retorno, a fictional city located on the outskirts of the state of Goiás. The girl is Agrado Garcia, a singer and songwriter with roots in sertanejo music who refuses to bow to the sexism of the music industry in pursuit of her dream of singing in front of large crowds.

Agrado was raised by her mother, Janete, and her godmother, Zuzu, in musical caravans, singing with them in modest performances from square to square. A fan of Marília Mendonça since she was a girl, she dreams of becoming a famous sertanejo singer, even though she has to deal with the schemes of Roney Soares, owner of an artist management agency and manager of João Raul, and Naiane, an influencer known as "Princesinha Country" (Country Princess) whose mother is powerful music entrepreneur Zilá Amaral. Naiane gets involved with João because of a marketing ploy, but she becomes genuinely interested in him and believes she can win him over, doing everything she can to get other women out of the way.

On her path to fame, Agrado meets the talented Eduarda Rasa, a diner employee who also dreams of a career in sertanejo music. Having been abandoned by her mother as a child, Duda, as she is called, refuses to be held back by her limitations. Duda and Agrado meet by chance at a music contest and decide to form the duo As Donas da Voz, facing prejudice and showing that women can go far in a musical genre dominated by men.

== Cast ==
- Isadora Cruz as Agrado Garcia / Diana
  - Rafa Justus as child Agrado
- Filipe Bragança as João Raul Macedo "Mozão do Brasil"
  - Rafael Rara as child João Raul
- Isabelle Drummond as Naiane Sampaio Amaral
  - Carolina Ferreira as child Naiane
- Gabz as Eduarda "Duda" Rasa
- David Junior as Leandro Brasil
- Leandra Leal as Zilá Garcia Sampaio Amaral
- Letícia Spiller as Janete Garcia
- Daniel de Oliveira as Alaor "Alaorzinho" Sampaio Amaral Filho
- Thomás Aquino as Ronei Soares
- Antônio Calloni as Walmir Macedo
- Elisa Lucinda as Zuleica "Zuzu" Miranda
- Marcos Caruso as Dr. Alaor Sampaio Amaral
- Ramille as Cinara Brito
- Guito Show as Malvino Boiadeiro
- Lucas Wickhaus as Luan Arreda-Boi
- Gabriel Godoy as Inácio Palhares Leite
- Luiz Henrique Nogueira as Zeca Barata
- Evaldo Macarrão as Agildo
- Diego Martins as Esteban Serran
- Kamila Amorim as Laura "Laurinha" Policarpo
- Luellem de Castro as Talita "Taly" Mendes
- Virgínia Rosa as Aldenora "Nora" Brito
- Luciana Souza as Rosalva Pinhal
- Cida Mendes as Leocádia Pinhal
- Cláudio Mendes as Agenor Policarpo
- Renata Caetano as Wilma Policarpo
- Victtor Hugo Maia as Tino Wagner
- Nina Baiocchi as Dr. Vânia
- Nathalia Cruz as Eva
- Fernanda Pimenta as Irene
- Yrla Braga as Rosinha
- Alexandre David as Claudio

=== Guest stars ===
- Paula Fernandes as Maria Cecília Garcia
- Stepan Nercessian as Eliomar Garcia
- Ricardo Pereira as Jean Carlos Garcia
- Ana Barroso as Branca Sampaio Amaral
- Bruno Mazzeo as Tom Bastos
- Ninah Sampaio as Giovana
- Vicente Tuchinski as Hugo
- Thaisa Santoth as Mari
- Michel Teló as himself
- Daniel as himself
- Maiara & Maraisa as themselves
- Ana Castela as herself
- Naiara Azevedo as herself
- Marília Mendonça as herself (archive images)

== Production ==
=== Development ===
In February 2024, TV Globo approved the return of Maria Helena Nascimento after shelving O Grande Golpe, a telenovela scheduled for the 9 PM slot, co-written with Ricardo Linhares. The network asked Nascimento to write a script for the 7PM slot, with the possibility of it replacing Volta por Cima in the second half of 2025. Nascimento's last telenovela was Rock Story (2016–17), and she was asked to write a musical-themed script for her next project, but different from her previous work.

With the cancellation of Conta Comigo, written by Mauro Wilson, which led to moving forward the production of Volta por Cima, and the approval of Dona de Mim, Maria Helena's telenovela remained scheduled for the second half of 2025. In May 2024, Globo announced the rehiring of Izabel de Oliveira, who had been dismissed in 2020 due to restructuring caused by the COVID-19 pandemic, with her last work at the network having been Verão 90 (2019), co-written with Paula Amaral. In June, the Globo decided that Nascimento and Oliveira would write the replacement for Dona de Mim together. The script was given the working title Donas da Voz, but to avoid confusion with its predecessor, the title was changed to Coração Acelerado. Carlos Araújo was chosen to direct the telenovela.

Initially scheduled to premiere on 17 November 2025, the telenovela was postponed to 12 January 2026, mainly to avoid the end-of-year holiday season, when audiences tend to drop.

=== Filming ===
Filming began in October 2025 and was divided into two phases. The first took place in Goiás, near Goiânia, to depict the fictional city of Bom Retorno. In addition, scenes were filmed in the cities of Alto Paraíso de Goiás, Pirenópolis, São Gabriel, Cidade de Goiás, Crixás, and Pires do Rio, where one of the scenes took place during a real performance by Maiara & Maraisa. The second phase would take place in Rio de Janeiro at Estúdios Globo.

== Ratings ==
Season	Episodes	First aired		Last aired		Avg. viewers (points)
Season	Episodes	Date	Viewers (points)	Date	Viewers (points)	Avg. viewers (points)
1	TBA	12 January 2026	19.3	14 August 2026	23.2	19.6
