= Maurina =

Maurina may refer to:

== People ==
- Maurina Borges da Silveira (1926–2011), Brazilian Roman Catholic Franciscan Sister
- Zenta Mauriņa (1897–1978), Latvian writer, essayist, translator, and researcher

== Other uses ==
- Maurina village in the Italian Alps, in the province of Trentino, several kilometers outside the municipality of Spormaggiore.
