= Baptism of Blood (film) =

2006 film directed by Helvécio Ratton

- Theatrical release poster
- Directed by: Helvécio Ratton
- Written by: Dani Patarra; Helvécio Ratton
- Based on: Batismo de Sangue by Frei Betto
- Produced by: Helvécio Ratton
- Starring: Caio Blat; Daniel de Oliveira; Cássio Gabus Mendes; Ângelo Antônio
- Cinematography: Lauro Escorel
- Edited by: Mair Tavares
- Music by: Marco Antônio Guimarães
- Production company: Quimera Filmes
- Distributed by: RioFilme
- Release dates: 2006 (Festival de Brasília); April 20, 2007 (theatrical release)
- Running time: 94 minutes
- Country: Brazil
- Language: Portuguese
- Budget: R$5 million
- Box office: R$402,345

Baptism of Blood (Portuguese: Batismo de Sangue) is a 2006 Brazilian film directed by Helvécio Ratton, based on Frei Betto's book of the same name. Starring Caio Blat and Daniel de Oliveira as Frei Tito and Betto respectively, it follows the Dominican friars' resistance against Brazilian military dictatorship.

== Plot ==
In 1968, the Dominican friars of São Paulo became part of the resistance against the military dictatorship in Brazil. Under the pseudonyms of "Tito", "Betto", "Oswaldo", "Fernando", and "Ivo", the friars join the Ação Libertadora Nacional, a communist guerrilla movement headed by Carlos Marighella. The friars' superior, Diogo, recommends them to be more careful, and they decide to disperse themselves.

Ivo and Fernando go to Rio de Janeiro but are intercepted and tortured by officers who accuse them for betraying the Church and Brazil. The officers ask about the place where they receive calls from their leader, and eventually they reveal it. After intercepting a conversation, the police headed by Sérgio Paranhos Fleury discover where Marighella will be and kill him. Meanwhile, Betto is captured in Rio Grande do Sul, and is arrested at the penitentiary Tiradentes in São Paulo along with the other friars.

The friars are later judged and sentenced to four years of imprisonment. Tito is the only who is released in exchange for the West German ambassador in Brazil, Ehrenfried von Holleben, being exiled in France. He is psychologically shaken by the fact that he was tortured, and also because his attempt of suicide during the torture sessions was labeled as a coward act by Fleury. In 1974, he commits suicide in Éveux.

== Cast ==
- Caio Blat as Frei Tito
- Daniel de Oliveira as Frei Betto
- Cássio Gabus Mendes as Sérgio Paranhos Fleury
- Ângelo Antônio as Frei Oswaldo
- Léo Quintão as Frei Fernando
- Odilon Esteves as Frei Ivo
- Marku Ribas as Carlos Marighella
- Marcélia Cartaxo as Nildes
- Murilo Grossi as Raul Careca
- Jorge Emil as Frei Diogo

== Production ==
Most of scenes of Baptism of Blood were shot in Belo Horizonte, Minas Gerais that simulated São Paulo. The friars' imprisonment was filmed in Rio de Janeiro, while Tito's exile was shot in France. Differently from other films about the period, the director wanted the torture scenes to be not be merely illustrative. The scenes were reimagined, and Ratton said "[I would] either do something shocking, as the story is, or I would not do the film." The friars Betto, Fernando and Ivo lectured the cast on Brazil in the 1960s and student activism.

== Reception ==
It was first screened at the 39th Festival de Brasília, where it won the Best Director and Best Cinematography awards.
