= Caio Blat =

Brazilian actor (born 1980)

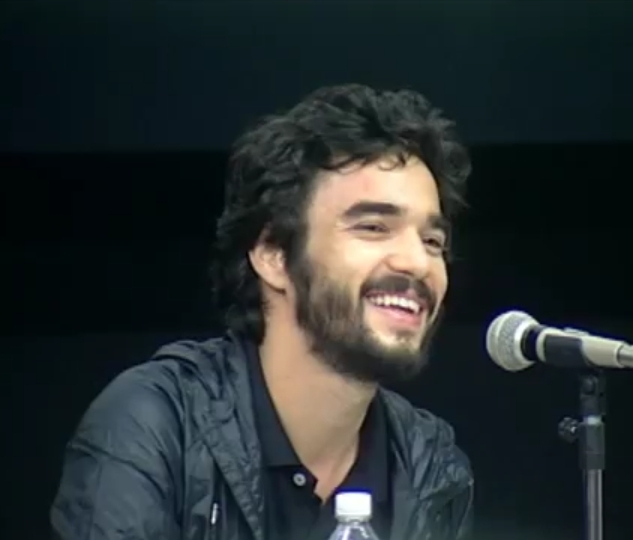
- Blat in 2018
- Born: 2 June 1980 (age 46); São Paulo, Brazil
- Occupation: Actor
- Years active: 1991–present
- Spouses: Ana Ariel (m. 2001; div. 2002) Maria Ribeiro (m. 2007; div. 2020)
- Children: 2
- Relatives: Ricardo Blat (cousin); Rogério Blat (cousin)

Caio Blat de Oliveira (born 2 June 1980) is a Brazilian actor.

== Biography ==
Blat was born in São Paulo, Brazil. He studied law at the University of São Paulo, the largest and one of the most prestigious universities in Brazil, but dropped out because of his acting career.

Caio is cousin of the playwright Rogério Blat and actor Ricardo Blat. The surname Blat is of Catalan origin and means 'wheat'.

== Career ==
Blat was discovered at the age of eight, when he accompanied his sisters to an audition at an advertising agency at their mother's suggestion. He was cast in a commercial and soon became a familiar face in advertising. Since then, he has appeared in over 200 productions across various media. A self-taught actor, Blat never completed a degree in Performing Arts nor the Law program he began. He has established a significant body of work in television, film, and theater.

In 2006, Blat joined the cast of the remake of the telenovela Sinhá Moça, as the abolitionist Mário, and also participated in two plays, Mordendo os Lábios and O Mundo é um Moinho. In 2007, he was in the TV production Amazônia, de Galvez a Chico Mendes, as the rubber tapper Xavier. He was also acting in the theater with the plays The Two Gentlemen of Verona and Chorin. In that year, he won the São Paulo Citizen of the Year Prize in the actor category, for his contribution to the city.

Blat never played a stereotypical lead role, yet he always played some important role in the telenovelas. He says he prefers to work on stage and film rather than on TV.

== Personal life ==
Blat also works as a volunteer in a charity which caters for 400 needy children in Campinas, São Paulo. It was there that he met his adopted son, Antônio.

In 2006, Blat began dating actress Maria Ribeiro, whom he married in November 2007. Their son Bento was born in January 2010. In 2015, the couple separated, but soon after reunited. In 2017, their ten-year marriage came to an end.

Caio Blat is a Spiritist.

== Filmography ==
=== Television ===
| Year | Title | Role | Notes |
|---|---|---|---|
| 1991 | Mundo da Lua | Big Bad Boy 2 | eps. "O Que Você Vai Ser", "Bye Bye Big Bad Boys" |
| 1992 | O Professor | Himself | |
| 1993 | Retrato de Mulher | | Cameo |
| 1994 | Éramos Seis | Carlos | |
| 1994 | As Pupilas do Senhor Reitor | Henrique | |
| 1996 | Você Decide | | ep. "Sangue no Araguaia" |
| 1998 | Fascinação | Gustavo | |
| 1999 | Chiquinha Gonzaga | João Batista Fernandes Lage | |
| 1999 | Andando nas Nuvens | Tiago San Marino | |
| 1999 | Terra Nostra | Pietro Riva | Cameo |
| 2000 | Esplendor | Bruno Sampaio | |
| 2001 | Um Anjo Caiu do Céu | Rafael | |
| 2001 | Brava Gente | Eufemia | ep. "Os Mistérios do Sexo" |
| 2002 | Coração de Estudante | Matheus | |
| 2004 | Da Cor do Pecado | Abelardo Sardinha | |
| 2005 | Carandiru, Outras Histórias | Deusdete | |
| 2005 | Sob Nova Direção | Waltinho | ep. "Como Eliminar seus Cheques" |
| 2006 | Sinhá Moça | Mário Mathias | |
| 2007 | Amazônia, de Galvez a Chico Mendes | Xavier | |
| 2007 | Linha Direta | Raimundo Lacerda Duque | ep. "Ana Lídia" |
| 2008 | Ciranda de Pedra | Afonso | |
| 2008 | Episódio Especial | Himself | Cameo |
| 2009 | India – A Love Story | Ravi | |
| 2009 | Episódio Especial | Himself | Cameo |
| 2011 | O Bem Amado | Neco Pedreira | |
| 2011 | Morde & Assopra | Leandro Pereira | |
| 2012 | Xingu | Leonardo Villas-Bôas | |
| 2012 | Lado a Lado | Fernando Lemos Vieira | |
| 2013 | Joia Rara | Sonan Gyatso | |
| 2014 | Império | José Pedro | |
| 2016 | Liberdade, Liberdade | André | |
| 2018 | Deus Salve o Rei | Cássio | |
| 2018 | Carcereiros | Samuel | |
| 2018 | McMafia | Antonio Méndez | Miniseries |
| 2022 | Mar do Sertão | Pajeú | |
| 2025 | Beleza Fatal | Dr. Benjamin Argento | |

=== Film ===
| Year | Title | Role | Notes |
|---|---|---|---|
| 1998 | Avocado Seed | Pedro Moraes | |
| 2001 | Lavoura Arcaica | Lula | |
| 2001 | Cats & Dogs | Lou | Brazilian voice dubbing |
| 2002 | Cat's Cradle | Cristiano | |
| 2003 | Carandiru | Deusdete | |
| 2005 | What Is It Worth? | | |
| 2005 | O Quintal dos Guerrilheiros | Toti | Short film |
| 2006 | The Year My Parents Went on Vacation | Ítalo | |
| 2006 | Bog of Beasts | Cícero | |
| 2006 | Forbidden to Forbid | Paulo | |
| 2007 | Baptism of Blood | Frei Tito | |
| 2008 | Bezerra de Menezes: O Diário de um Espírito | Military | |
| 2010 | Love Stories Only Last 90 minutes | Zeca | |
| 2010 | The Tenants (Don't Like It, Leave) | Evandro | |
| 2010 | O Bem Amado | Neco Pedreira | |
| 2010 | Bróder | Macú | |
| 2010 | The Best Things in the World | Artur | |
| 2011 | As Mães de Chico Xavier | Karl | |
| 2012 | Meus Dois Amores | Manuel | |
| 2012 | Xingu | Leonardo Villas-Bôas | |
| 2013 | Sheep's Clothing | Felipe | |
| 2014 | Alemão | Samuel | |
| 2019 | Spider | | |

Theater
| Year | Title |
|---|---|
| 1997 | O Homem das Galochas |
| 2000 | Macário |
| 2002 | Êxtase |
| 2003 | Karma |
| 2003 | Miranda |
| 2004 | Leve, o Próximo Nome da Terra |
| 2005 | Liberdade Para as Borboletas |
| 2006 | Mordendo os Lábios |
| 2006 | O Mundo é um Moinho |
| 2007 | Os Dois Cavalheiros de Verona |
| 2007 | O Chorinho |
