= O Rebu =

Brazilian telenovela

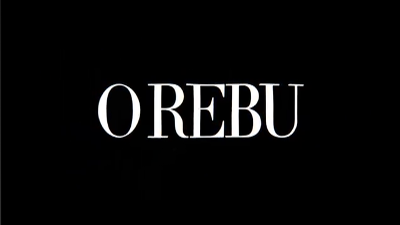
- Genre: Thriller
- Created by: Bráulio Pedroso
- Based on: O Rebu
- Written by: George Moura; Sérgio Goldenberg
- Directed by: José Luiz Villamarim
- Starring: Patrícia Pillar; Tony Ramos; Sophie Charlotte; Daniel de Oliveira; Dira Paes; Jose de Abreu
- Country of origin: Brazil
- Original language: Portuguese
- No. of episodes: 36 (original version); 20 (international version)

Production
- Production locations: Rio de Janeiro, Brazil
- Camera setup: Multi-camera
- Running time: Original run: 45-25 minutes Syndication: 45 minutes

Original release
- Network: TV Globo
- Release: 14 July – 12 September 2014

O Rebu (Literally English: The Fuss, International Title: The Party) is a Brazilian late night telenovela written by George Moura and Sérgio Goldenberg (based on Bráulio Pedroso's original story) and directed by José Luiz Villamarim. O Rebu's plot is loosely based on the 1974 telenovela of the same name, featuring an innovative narrative: the whole story takes place in 24 hours. In three different times, party, next day with the investigation and flashbacks with the suspects' past.

A total of 36 half-hour episodes were broadcast on TV Globo between 14 July to 12 September 2014. The international version contains 20 episodes.

The telenovela stars Patrícia Pillar, Tony Ramos, Sophie Charlotte and Daniel de Oliveira in lead roles, while the supporting cast includes Cássia Kis and José de Abreu.

== Plot ==
A luxurious reception is interrupted when a body is found floating in the pool. One thing is certain: the murderer is among the high society guests. The businesswoman Angela Mahler (Patrícia Pillar) is the party hostess celebrating her recent business success. She shares the spotlight with Duda (Sophie Charlotte), her “daughter at heart”, and the contractor Braga (Tony Ramos), her business partner and nemesis.

The celebratory mood is threatened by the arrival of Bruno (Daniel de Oliveira), an ambitious young man who became involved with Duda in order to gain access to confidential information from Angela's and Braga's companies—he knows he can use his power over her to achieve whatever he wants.

The guests have their own issues to solve as well such as betrayals, secrets, and cunning moves. The event ends up bringing enemies together under the same roof, like a powder keg ready to explode.

All of a sudden, Bruno's body is found, and what was once a party quickly becomes the scene of a despicable crime. Thus begins a frantic search for the murderer in an investigation led by the police officer Pedroso (Marcos Palmeira) and Rosa (Dira Paes), his right-hand woman. Trapped in the house and under the investigators’ crosshairs, all the guests are suspects. Who could be behind this mystery?

== Cast ==
Actor	Role
Patrícia Pillar	Angela Mahler
Tony Ramos	Carlos Braga Vidigal
Sophie Charlotte	Maria Eduarda Mahler (Duda)
Daniel de Oliveira	Bruno Ferraz
Cássia Kis Magro	Gilda Rezende
José de Abreu	Bernardo Rezende
Marcos Palmeira	Nuno Pedroso
Dira Paes	Rosa
Júlio Andrade	Oswaldo
Jesuíta Barbosa	Alain
Vera Holtz	Vic Garcez
Camila Morgado	Maria Angélica
Mariana Lima	Roberta Camargo
Maria Flor	Camila
Eucir de Souza	Brandão
Jean Pierre Noher	Pierre
Cláudio Jaborandy	Severino
César Ferrário	Adão
Laura Neiva	Betina
Val Perré	Zé Maria
Bianca Müller	Mirna
Anna Cotrim	Lourdes
Antônio Fábio	Nilo
Elea Mercúrio	Ludmila
Rodrigo Angel	Canetti
Níkolas Antunes	Fininho
Olívia Torres	Valentina Rezende
Luciana Brites	Ana Paula
Miguel Arraes	Michel Rezende
Nicola Lama	Stefano Giorgio
Hossen Minussi	Alfredo
Anna Tokiko	Magda
Marcelo Torreão	Antenor
Nando Brandão	H.D.
Bel Kowarick	Lídia Vidigal
Michel Noher	Antônio
Pablo Sanábio	Kiko
Vinícius de Oliveira	Eduardo
Bernadete Araújo	Júlia
Dyego Menezes	João
Rodrigo Angel	Canetti
Buza Ferraz	Cauê

== Ratings ==
Aired in the 11 p.m. slot in Brazil, The Party was seen by 24 million people in its premiere. During the last month on air, more than one million mentions were recorded on Twitter. The show had a huge audience in its broadcast on SIC, in Portugal, and was among the top 20 most watched programs in the country in that year.

== Broadcast ==
Country	TV network	Local title	Series premiere	Series finale	Weekly schedule	Timeslot
Brazil	TV Globo	O Rebu	July 14, 2014	September 12, 2014	Monday to Friday	23:15
Portugal	SIC	O Rebu	July 28, 2014	September 19, 2014	Monday to Friday	23:45
Ecuador	Ecuavisa	Party	2016	2016	Monday to Friday	22:45
