= Bruno Dubeux =

- Born: Bruno Dubeux de Andrade; February 8, 1981 (age 44); Bryan, Texas, U.S
- Occupations: Actor and doctor
- Years active: 2010–present

Bruno Dubeux de Andrade (born February 8, 1981), best known as Bruno Dubeux, is an American-born Brazilian actor and doctor.

== Biography ==
Bruno Dubeux was born in Bryan, Texas to Brazilian parents. He is a member of the traditional Burle Dubeux family, a Pernambucan family of French descent. When he was born, his parents were university students and they were in the United States. He left his hometown of Bryan, Texas, only 3 months old when his parents returned to Recife, Pernambuco.

He holds a degree in medicine from the Federal University of Pernambuco with a postgraduate degree in pediatrics at the University of Porto and a year of internship at the Harvard Medical School and a degree in Performing Arts from UniverCidade.

== Filmography ==
=== Television ===
Year	Title	Role	TV Channel
2022	Mar do Sertão	Savinho	Rede Globo
2021	Salve-se Quem Puder	Luciano	Rede Globo
2018	Orgulho e Paixão	Gerente de fábrica	Rede Globo
2017	Novo Mundo		Rede Globo
2015	Babilônia	João Paulo	Rede Globo
2014	Geração Brasil	Breno	Rede Globo
2014	Segredos Médicos	Dr. Marco Navarro	Multishow
2014	Em Família	Dr. Camargo	Rede Globo
2014	Amor à Vida	Samuel	Rede Globo
2012	Malhação	Michel	Rede Globo
2011	Alternativa Saúde	Presenter	GNT (Globosat)

=== Film ===
Year	Title	Role	Notes
2014	#Garotas	Ângelo	
2013	Para Sempre Nunca Mais	Joaquim	
2012	Estado de exceção		
2010	Rio Sex Comedy		
