= José de Abreu =

Brazilian actor (born 1946)

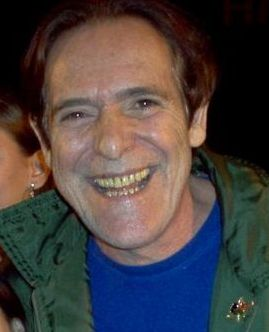
- Abreu in 2004
- Born: 24 May 1946 (age 80); Santa Rita do Passa Quatro, São Paulo, Brazil
- Occupation: Actor
- Years active: 1967–present
- Known for: Avenida Brasil
- Spouses: Nara Keiserman (m. 1974; div. 1990) Priscila Petit (m. 2015; div. 2016)
- Children: 5 (1 deceased)
- Relatives: Maria Bopp (great-niece)

José Pereira de Abreu Júnior (Brazilian Portuguese: [ʒuˈzɛ dʒi aˈbɾɛw]; born 24 May 1946) is a Brazilian actor.

== Biography ==
Born in the city of Santa Rita do Passa Quatro, in the state of São Paulo, at the age of fourteen he moved to the state's capital, São Paulo city, working as a lab assistant and office-boy for a law firm.

In 1967, while studying law at the Pontifícia Universidade Católica de São Paulo, he began his theatrical career at the Teatro da Pontifícia Universidade Católica de São Paulo, with the play Morte e Vida Severina by João Cabral de Melo Neto and Chico Buarque.

A year later, he was starring in movies, but his career came to a quick halt because of his political activism. Abreu was arrested during a meeting of the União Nacional dos Estudantes, belonged to the Ação Popular and gave logistical support to the Vanguarda Armada Revolucionária Palmares, a leftist group that fought against the military regime. He also joined the hippie movement during that time, in contrast with his militaristic actions.

Forced into exile in Europe in 1968, he returned in 1974 to live in Pelotas, state of Rio Grande do Sul, his wife's homeland. They both taught at the federal university in that city, but soon moved to Porto Alegre, where he produced musicals and starred in children's plays. With his wife, he produced the first staging of the musical Os Saltimbancos in that state.

Then, after the success of the movie A Intrusa (The Intruder) (1979), filmed in Uruguaiana, Rio Grande do Sul, he started work as an actor in TV Globo's soap-operas.

In 2006 he partnered with director Luiz Arthur Nunes to create Fala, Zé!, a theatrical monologue in which he critically reflects on his generation, crossing biography and fiction.

In 2011 he played Milton in the soap-opera Insensato Coração; in 2012, the character Nilo in Avenida Brasil; in 2013, the character Ernest in Joia Rara; and in 2015 the villain Gibson Stewart in A Regra do Jogo.

== Personal life ==
He has five children, with three different partners. His first child, Rodrigo, died in an accident in 1992, at age 21. He also has four grandchildren. In early 2013, he declared he is bisexual, then in a few days later he tweeted he is not bi but poly instead.

On March 8, 2019, he was jokingly proclaimed as "president" of the Federative Republic of Brazil in an act of protest at Galeao Airport near Rio.

He is the great-uncle of actress and screenwriter Maria Bopp, known for being the protagonist of the Fox Premium's TV series Me Chama de Bruna, where she plays the role of famous real-life sex worker Bruna Surfistinha.

== Career ==
Abreu performed in over 24 movies and 47 television shows, of which most are soap operas.

== Filmography ==
=== Television ===
| Year | Title | Role | Note |
|---|---|---|---|
| 1981 | Sítio do Picapau Amarelo | Rapunzel's Father | Episode: "Rapunzel" |
| 1984 | Sítio do Picapau Amarelo | Barba Azul | Episode: "Barba Azul, o Cara de Coruja" |
| 1987 | O Outro | Genésio | |
| 1988 | Bebê a Bordo | Antônio Barbirotto (Tonhão) | |
| 1990 | Pantanal | Gustavo | |
| 1993 | Renascer | Egberto Ramos | |
| 1993 | Sonho Meu | Geraldo | |
| 1995 | História de Amor | Daniel Veloso | |
| 1997 | A Indomada | Delegate Motinha | |
| 1998 | Corpo Dourado | Renato | |
| 1999 | Força de um Desejo | Pereira | Guest star |
| 2000 | Vila Madalena | Viriato | Guest star |
| 2001 | Porto dos Milagres | Eriberto | |
| 2002 | Desejos de Mulher | Bruno Vargas | |
| 2003 | A Casa das Sete Mulheres | Onofre Pires | |
| 2003 | Malhação | Paulo Viana | Season 10 |
| 2004 | Senhora do Destino | Josivaldo da Silva | |
| 2006 | JK | Carlos Frederico Werneck de Lacerda | |
| 2007 | Desejo Proibido | Francisco Fernandes | |
| 2009 | Caminho das Índias | Sacerdote Pandit | |
| 2009 | Malhação ID | Augusto Livramento | Season 17 |
| 2011 | Insensato Coração | Milton Castelani | |
| 2012 | Avenida Brasil | Nilo Oliveira | |
| 2013 | Joia Rara | Ernest Hauser | |
| 2014 | O Rebu | Bernardo Rezende | |
| 2015 | A Regra do Jogo | Gibson Stewart (DAD) | |
| 2018 | Segundo Sol | Dorival "Dodô" Falcão | |
| 2019 | A Dona do Pedaço | Otávio Guedes | |
| 2021 | Um Lugar ao Sol | Santiago | |
| 2022 | Mar do Sertão | Coronel Tertúlio | |
| 2025 | Guerreiros do Sol | Elói | |

==== Film ====
| Year | Title | Role | Note |
|---|---|---|---|
| 1979 | A Intrusa | Christian | |
| 1987 | Anjos do Arrabalde | Soares | |
| 2012 | My Sweet Orange Tree | Portuga | |
| 2013 | Time and the Wind | Ricardo Amaral | |
