= Isadora Cruz =

Brazilian actress (born 1998)

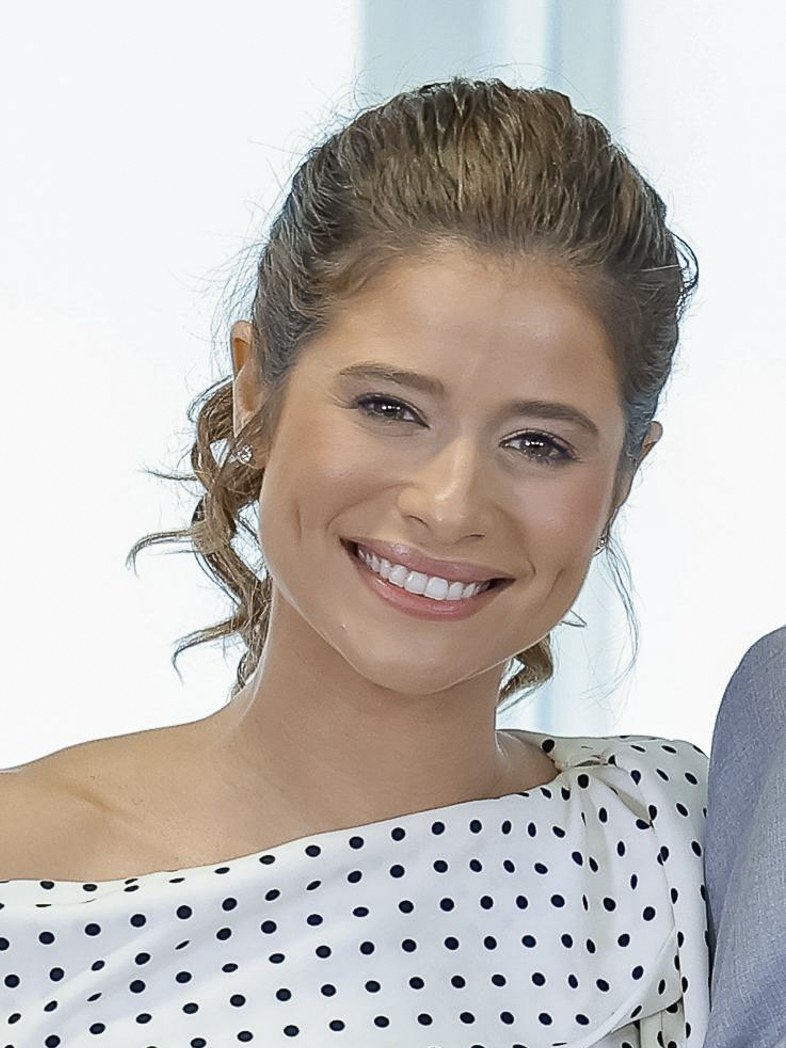
- Cruz at the Planalto Palace in 2026
- Born: Isadora Cruz Rocha; 4 February 1998 (age 28); João Pessoa, Paraíba, Brazil
- Occupation: Actress
- Years active: 2016–present

Isadora Cruz Rocha (Brazilian Portuguese: [izaˈdɔɾɐ ˈkɾuʃ]; born 4 February 1998) is a Brazilian actress. She gained national notoriety for her portrayal of the character Candoca, the protagonist of the telenovela Mar do Sertão.

== Early life ==
Isadora Cruz Rocha was born on February 4, 1998, in João Pessoa, Paraíba. She is the daughter of Victor Hugo Rocha and Rachel Cruz, and sister of Tercilio Cruz Neto and Sophia Cruz. As a child, Cruz lived in Miami, USA. Cruz first encountered the arts through ballet classes, and upon returning to her hometown of João Pessoa in 2002, she studied contemporary dance and jazz. At the age of 15, she passed the administration course at the Federal University of Paraíba (UFPB), but cancelled her degree: "I was getting straight A's, but I felt like I was wasting my time. I wanted to be an actress". At age 16, she moved to Paris, France, where she studied French at the Sorbonne University and theater at the Cours Florent.

== Career ==
=== 2016–present: National rise ===
In 2016, she made her debut in the telenovela Haja Coração, playing the sweet and gentle Cris, Felipe's (Marcos Pitombo) half-sister. In 2022, she was cast as Candoca, the protagonist of the telenovela Mar do Sertão, where she gained national recognition. In 2024, she was cast in the 7pm soap opera Volta por Cima as the slut Roxelle, Chico's (Amaury Lorenzo) lover; initially a mere rival of Madalena (Jéssica Ellen), Roxelle gains prominence in the plot after her breakup with Chico, largely due to her friendship with Gigi (Rodrigo Fagundes) and Neuza (Valdinéia Soriano) and her troubled relationship with the bookmaker Gerson (Enrique Díaz). Alongside Volta Por Cima, the actress participated in a new opening of Fantástico, as part of the celebrations for Rede Globo's 60th anniversary.

In June 2025, Love Is a Knife premiered on Globoplay, where Cruz starred as Rosa Pellegrino — a fearless woman from the Brazilian sertão during the 1920s and 1930s — the main character and narrator of the work created by George Moura and Sergio Goldenberg. She was chosen for the role in early 2023, following her success as Candoca in Mar do Sertão (2022).

In May 2025, she accepted director Carlos Araújo's invitation to play Agrado Garcia, one of the protagonists of Coração Acelerado, a telenovela written by Maria Helena Nascimento and Izabel de Oliveira. The character has dreamed and worked since childhood to become a successful sertanejo music singer. She addresses the character's family background as a lineage of strong female musicians. Cruz needed to focus on learning the accent of the state of Goiás – which is very different from your natural accent – but the biggest challenge was the singing and guitar lessons. The references for creating the character are the female singers-songwriters of the sertanejo music scene, as Marília Mendonça and Ana Castela.

== Other ventures ==
=== Activism and philanthropy ===
The actress lent her voice to the #VocêNãoEstáSozinha (Note: English: You Are Not Alone) campaign, created by the singer Juliette. The campaign sought to give visibility to the real stories of women who were victims of femicide at the hands of their partners or ex-partners.

=== Endorsements ===
In January 2021, she portrayed the fortune teller Madame Colorama in the campaign for L'Oréal's Colorama nail polish brand. In 2025, Cruz was the face of Arezzo's Christmas campaign entitled "Presença é o Presente Perfeito" and it featured her mother and grandmother.

== Personal life ==
On July 17, 2023, during the filming of Guerreiros do Sol, she was admitted to a hospital in the city of São Paulo with acute pyelonephritis, a kidney infection. She had to return on July 25 after a relapse of the disease.

On June 17, 2025, she made her relationship with Norwegian-Brazilian skier Lucas Braathen public.

== Filmography ==
=== Film ===
Key
†	Denotes film or TV productions that have not yet been released

Year	Title	Role	Notes	Ref.
2018	Thanks for Sharing	Raquel	Short film	
2018	Record	Victoria Ruiz	Short film	
2018	Looking for Jude	Margareth	Short film	
2020	Men at Work: Miami	Vlogster		
2021	The Mad Hatter	Chelsey	Prime Video	
2023	Auguri	Maria Vera		
TBA	Unto the Son †	Rose		

=== Television ===
Year	Title	Role	Notes	Ref.
2016	Haja Coração	Cristina Miranda Maggione (Cris)		
2022–23	Mar do Sertão	Maria Cândida Madeira Aguiar (Candoca)		
2024–25	Volta por Cima	Roxelle da Cruz Diegues		
2025	Guerreiros do Sol	Rosa Pellegrino		
2026	Coração Acelerado	Agrado Garcia		

== Awards and nominations ==
Awards and nominations received by Isadora Cruz
Award	Year (Note: Indicates the year of ceremony. Each year is linked to the article about the awards held that year, wherever possible.)	Category	Nominated work	Result	Ref.
Contigo! Online Award	2022	Soap Opera Actress	Mar do Sertão	Nominated	
Acervo Awards	2023	Actress of the Year	Mar do Sertão	Nominated	
ArteBlitz Novel Award	2023	Best Leading Actress	Mar do Sertão	Nominated	
iBest Award	2024	Influencer Paraíba	Herself	Nominated	
F5 Award	2024	Best Supporting Performance	Volta por Cima	Nominated	
GLP4 Award	2025	Actress of the Year	Guerreiros do Sol	Nominated	
Melhores do Ano NaTelinha	2025	Best Actress	Guerreiros do Sol	Nominated	
