= Guerreiros do Sol =

Brazilian telenovela

- Genre: Telenovela
- Created by: George Moura; Sergio Goldenberg
- Based on: Guerreiros do Sol: Violência e Banditismo no Nordeste do Brasil by Frederico Pernambucano de Mello
- Written by: Cláudia Tajes; Mariana Mesquita; Ana Flávia Marques; Dione Carlos; Marcos Barbosa
- Directed by: Rogério Gomes
- Starring: Isadora Cruz; Thomás Aquino; Alexandre Nero; Irandhir Santos; José de Abreu; Daniel de Oliveira; Nathalia Dill; Alinne Moraes
- Theme music composer: Zé Ramalho
- Opening theme: "Cavalos do Cão" by Zé Ramalho ft. Elba Ramalho
- Country of origin: Brazil
- Original language: Portuguese
- No. of episodes: 45

Production
- Executive producers: Simone Lamosa; Lucas Zardo
- Producer: Juliana Castro
- Production company: Estúdios Globo

Original release
- Network: Globoplay
- Release: 11 June – 6 August 2025

Guerreiros do Sol (English title: Love is a Knife) is a Brazilian telenovela created by George Moura and Sergio Goldenberg. It premiered on Globoplay on 11 June 2025 and ended on 6 August 2025. The series stars Isadora Cruz, Thomás Aquino, Alexandre Nero, Irandhir Santos, José de Abreu, Daniel de Oliveira, Nathalia Dill and Alinne Moraes.

== Cast ==
- Isadora Cruz as Rosa Pellegrino
- Thomás Aquino as Josué Alencar
- José de Abreu as Elói
- Daniel de Oliveira as Idálio
- Alinne Moraes as Jânia
- Alexandre Nero as Miguel Ignácio
- Irandhir Santos as Arduino Alencar
- Nathalia Dill as Valiana
- Alanys Santos as Enedina
- Luiz Carlos Vasconcelos as Bosco
- Alice Carvalho as Otília
- Carla Salle as Soraia
- Heloísa Honein as Maura Weber
- Marcélia Cartaxo as Sra. Alencar
- Vitor Sampaio as Sabiá Alencar
- Theresa Fonseca as Aldezira
- Duda Santos as Guiomar
- Mayana Neiva as Linete
- Kaysar Dadour as Almir
- Ítalo Martins as Milagre Alencar
- Larissa Bocchino as Ivonete
- Begê Muniz as Antônio Ferraz
- Larissa Goes as Petúnia
- Márcio Vito as Natanael
- Diogo Tarré as Romualdo
- Dani Barros
- Gustavo Machado
- Renato Livera
- Romeu Benedicto as Tonhão
- Georgina Castro
- Pedro Wagner as Pente Fino
- Rafael Sieg
- Rodrigo Lelis as Padre Alencar
- Mateus Honori as Lucinio
- Kelner Macêdo
- Joao Fontenele as Arigó
- Suzy Lopes
- Amaurih Oliveira
- Tiago Homci
- Thommy Schiavo as Elmar
- Diego Homci
- Cadu Libonati as Vicente
- Ênio Cavalcante as Gasolina
- Luan Vieira as Bernardino
- Laíze Camara as Francisca
- Fátima Macedo
- Nicollas Paixão as Peixinho
- Nuno Queiroz as Malacabado

=== Guest stars ===
- Otávio Müller as Átila
- Tuca Andrada as Heleno

== Production ==
In September 2021, a new script developed by George Moura and Sergio Goldenberg was approved by TV Globo, initially as a series and with no premiere planned. In March 2022, the network announced that the series would be Globoplay's third original telenovela. In December 2022, Rogério Gomes was announced as director of the telenovela. In January 2023, the creative team began reading scrips and decided on Paraíba, Pernambuco, Sergipe, Alagoas and Globo Studios as shooting locations. Until September 2023, the telenovela was scheduled to premiere in 2024, however, the executive director of Globoplay, Erick Bretas, announced on his social media accounts that the telenovela had been delayed until 2025. It was scheduled to premiere on 1 April 2025, but was postponed to avoid comparisons with the plot of Maria e o Cangaço, a Disney+ miniseries, which would premiere the same month.

== Release ==
The telenovela premiered on Globoplay on 11 June 2025, with five episodes being released weekly until 6 August 2025. Additionally, it aired weeknights on Globoplay Novelas from 11 June 2025 to 12 August 2025, being one of the first telenovelas aired on the channel that succeeded Viva.
