= Assassination of Charles Rodney Chandler =

1968 murder of US Army officer

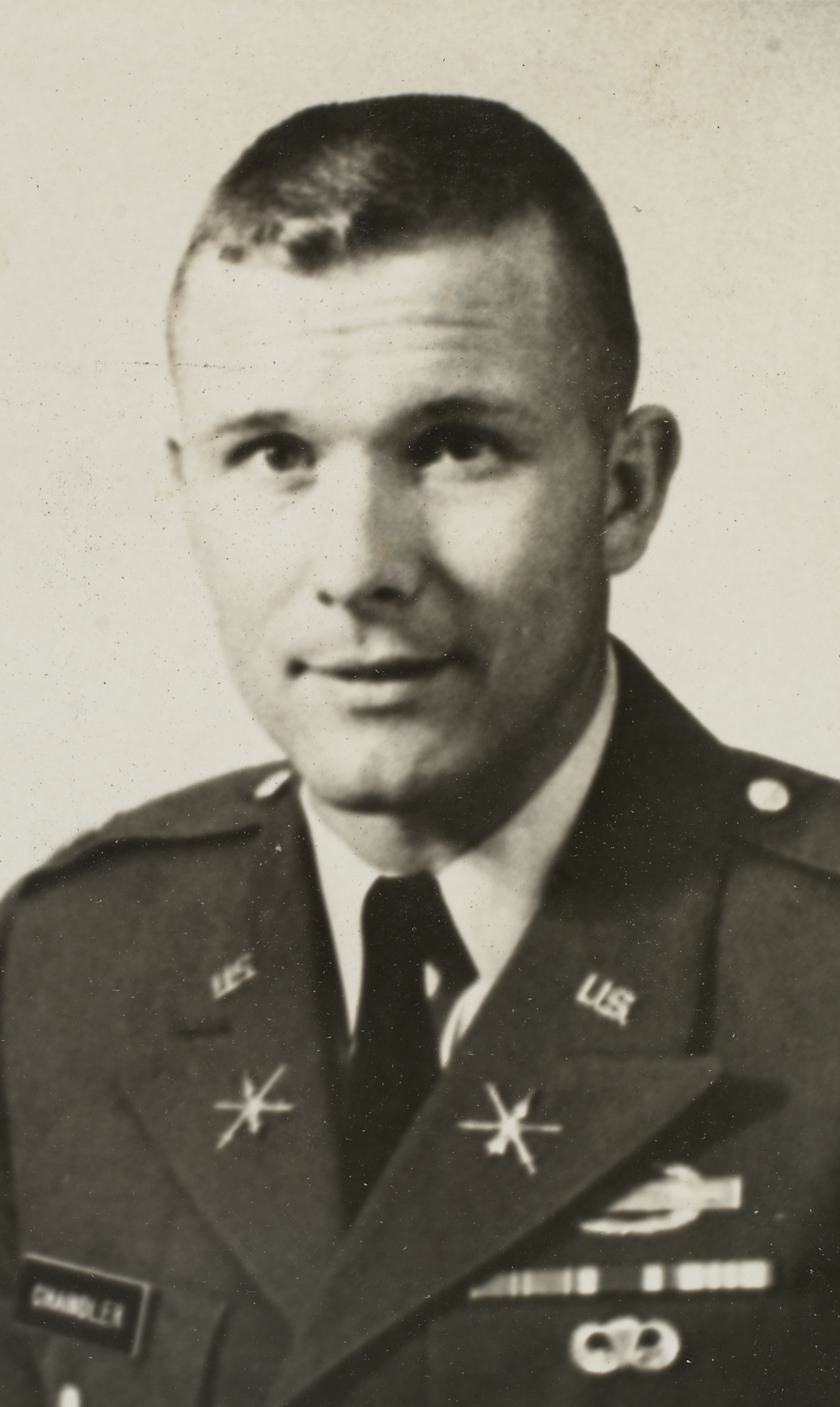
Army portrait of Chandler

Charles Rodney Chandler (July 23, 1938 – October 12, 1968) was a US Army officer and veteran of the Vietnam War assassinated by members of the Vanguarda Popular Revolucionária (VPR) and the Ação Libertadora Nacional (ALN) in São Paulo, Brazil.

== Assassination ==
On the morning of October 12, 1968, Chandler and his son planned to visit São Paulo's enormous Ibirapuera Park. Chandler entered his Chevrolet Impala station wagon, backed out of the garage, but stopped as he waited for his son to close the gate, then was blocked by a Volkswagen Beetle from entering the road. As Chandler's wife and one of four children watched, Chandler was ambushed by Diógenes José Carvalho ("Luis"), who unloaded six rounds of his Taurus .38 caliber revolver into Chandler, then Marcos Antonio Braz de Oliveira ("Marquito"), who opened fire on the American veteran with a machine gun. Chandler was riddled with 14 bullets. The assassination was planned for the anniversary of the death of Che Guevara, but delayed several days as Chandler had altered his routine.

According to the report prepared by the Department of Political and Social Order (DOPS), or Brazilian political police, organizations resisting the US-aligned military dictatorship in Brazil believed him to be a Central Intelligence Agency (CIA) spy sent to Brazil to teach torture techniques. However, according to Marighella's biographer Mario Magalhães, there is no evidence to support this belief; journalist Elio Gaspari wrote that Chandler was chosen because he was American and a veteran, not because he had committed any crime or misdeed. Per U.S. government sources, Chandler was studying advanced Portuguese at the University of São Paulo on an Olmsted Scholarship, planning to eventually teach the language at West Point, where he had begun his studies of the language.

The assassins dropped pamphlets with the text:

Criar um, dois, três Vietnãs, eis a palavra de ordem do comandante Che Guevara, que foi cruelmente assassinado na Bolívia por agentes imperialistas do nível deste Chandler, notório criminoso de guerra no Vietnã, e hoje punido e executado pela Justiça Revolucionária.

("Create one, two, three Vietnams, (Note: The actual Guevara quotation is "Create two, three, many Vietnams.") these are the words ordered by the commander Che Guevara, who was cruelly assassinated in Bolivia by imperialist agents such as this Chandler, notorious criminal in the War in Vietnam, today punished and executed by the Revolutionary Justice.")

US Department of Defense intelligence report made July 23, 1971: Brazil - The case of captain Charles Rodney Chandler, U.S. Army

According to an article published by Folha da Tarde at the time, the DOPS attributed the assassination to Carlos Marighella and nine other terrorists: Diogenes José Carvalho, Dulce de Souza, João Carlos Kfouri Quartim de Moraes, João Leonardo da Silva Rocha, Ladislaw Bowbor, Manoelina de Barros, Onofre Pinto, Pedro Lobo de Oliveira, and Marcos Antonio Braz de Oliveira.

== Legacy ==
The historian Carlos Fico characterizes the assassination of Chandler as having had a major impact on the Brazilian military regime, as he was a "North American captain, with such an aura."

Involvement in the planning of the assassination is among the baseless accusations supporters of Jair Bolsonaro spread about Dilma Rousseff.

== In popular culture ==
The assassination of Charles Rodney Chandler was portrayed in Wagner Moura's 2019 film Marighella.
