= Mar do Sertão =

- Genre: Telenovela
- Created by: Mário Teixeira
- Written by: Marcos Lazarini; Claudia Gomes; Dino Cantelli; Carol Santos
- Directed by: Allan Fiterman
- Starring: Isadora Cruz; Sergio Guizé; Renato Góes
- Theme music composer: Sá & Guarabyra
- Opening theme: "Sobradinho" by Chico César
- Country of origin: Brazil
- Original language: Portuguese
- No. of seasons: 1
- No. of episodes: 178

Production
- Producer: Silvana Feu
- Production company: Estúdios Globo

Original release
- Network: TV Globo
- Release: 22 August 2022 – 17 March 2023

Mar do Sertão is a Brazilian telenovela produced and broadcast by TV Globo, that aired from 22 August 2022 to 17 March 2023. The telenovela is created by Mário Teixeira. It stars Isadora Cruz, Sergio Guizé and Renato Góes.

== Cast ==
- Isadora Cruz as Candoca
- Sergio Guizé as Zé Paulino
- Renato Góes as Tertulinho
- Cyria Coentro as Dodôca
- Débora Bloch as Deodora
- José de Abreu as Coronel Tertúlio
- Enrique Diaz as Timbó
- Giovana Cordeiro as Xaviera
- Caio Blat as Pajeú
- Clarissa Pinheiro as Teresa
- Lucas Galvino as Mirinho
- Sara Vidal as Rosinha
  - Manu Guimarães as child Rosinha
- Thardelly Lima as Vespertino
- Suzy Lopes as Cira
- Nanego Lira as Padre Zezeo
- Everaldo Pontes as Adamastor
- Welder Rodrigues as Sabá Bodó
- Érico Brás as Eudoro Cidão
- Leandro Daniel as Floro Borromeu
- Eli Ferreira as Laura Pinho
- Felipe Velozo as Tomás
- Déo Garcez as Catão
- Ana Miranda as Ismênia
- Mariana Sena as Lorena
- Theresa Fonseca as Labibe
- Pedro Lamin
- Wilson Rabelo
- Titina Medeiros as Nivalda
- César Ferrario as Zahym
- Quitéria Kelly as Latifa
- José Dumont
- Bruno Dubeux as Savinho
- Cosme dos Santos as Janjão
- Matteus Cardoso as Zé Leiteiro
- Renan Monteiro
- Julia Mendes as Anita
- Giovanna Figueiredo as Jessilaine
- Enzo Diniz as Manduca
- Miguel Venerabile as Joca
- Theo Matos as child Cirino

== Production ==
=== Development ===
In June 2021, it was announced that Mário Teixeira presented to TV Globo the first episodes of the telenovela, in which they were approved and ordered to enter the 6pm time slot. In August 2021, it was announced that the telenovela would be directed by Vinícius Coimbra, who had previously worked with Teixeira in Liberdade, Liberdade, and that the story would be set in the Sertão region. In October 2021, Mar do Sertão was announced as the official title of the telenovela. In February 2022, Vinícius Coimbra was removed from the production after accusations of racism reported behind the scenes of Nos Tempos do Imperador, and was replaced by Allan Fiterman.

== Ratings ==
Season	Episodes	First aired		Last aired		Avg. viewers (points)
Season	Episodes	Date	Viewers (points)	Date	Viewers (points)	Avg. viewers (points)
1	178	22 August 2022	20.7	17 March 2023	18.4	19.2
