= Minimanual of the Urban Guerrilla =

1969 essay by Carlos Marighella

- Author: Carlos Marighella
- Original title: Minimanual do Guerrilheiro Urbano
- Subject: revolution
- Publication date: June 1969
- ISBN: 1-894925-02-5

The Minimanual of the Urban Guerrilla (Brazilian Portuguese: Minimanual do Guerrilheiro Urbano) is a book written by Brazilian Marxist–Leninist revolutionary Carlos Marighella in 1969. It is one of Marighella's most publicized works, serving as guidance to communist revolutionary movements that want to use guerrilla tactics. In this work, Marighella detailed urban guerrilla tactics to be employed in the struggles against authoritarian regimes. The text has been banned in several countries, but remains largely in print and on bookshelves in several others, including the United States.

"It is necessary for every urban guerrilla to keep in mind always that he can only maintain his existence if he is disposed to kill the police and those dedicated to repression, and if he is determined to expropriate the wealth of the big capitalists, the latifundists and the imperialists."

== Usage ==
The minimanual was written deliberately to be a concise reference text for would-be revolutionaries and guerrilla fighters. It describes methods and strategies for bringing about a successful revolution, evoking other earlier Marxist–Leninist revolutions, such as the Cuban and Chinese revolutions.

Published five years after the 1964 rise of the Brazilian dictatorship and just one year after the worldwide 1968 student rebellions, and at a time when hopes for international revolution among far-left militants and intellectuals were at their peak. The minimanual became an important tool and reference point for Marxist–Leninist guerrillas, and was also studied extensively by national liberation movements and organizations such as the Sandinistas of Nicaragua.

During the 1980s, the United States Central Intelligence Agency (CIA) sought to better understand and combat terrorist movements and anti-government armed militancy more effectively. In order to achieve this, the CIA produced English and Spanish translations that were distributed among intelligence services worldwide. These translations also served as teaching materials at the CIA-run School of the Americas in Panama.

== Historical context ==
Carlos Marighella wrote the Minimanual of the Urban Guerilla with the intention of popularizing guerrilla tactics. His goal was "not only for people to read this manual here and now, but to spread its content far and wide." According to Marighella, an urban guerrilla is "a person who fights against a military dictatorship with weapons, using unconventional methods." There was an explicit desire to instigate an armed revolutionary struggle against Brazil's military dictatorship, characterizing the book as a practical action manual. For Marighella, the fundamental characteristic of an urban guerrilla was participation in the armed struggle and the expropriation of lands belonging to major capitalists and landowners.

== Guerrilla tactics ==
=== Aggressive and mobile ===
For Marighella, the key characteristics of effective guerrilla tactics were an aggressive nature, hit-and-run attack actions, and the ultimate objective of developing the guerrilla force itself. The goal was to demoralize and wear down the police and military forces embodied by Brazil's Department of Political and Social Order (DOPS) under the military dictatorship. Marighella argued that a defensive posture would lead to the guerrillas' destruction, as they were "inferior to the enemy in firepower," making "defensive action" tantamount to death.

However, Marighella highlighted some advantages guerrillas possessed: knowledge of the terrain, ability to formulate surprise attacks, and greater mobility and speed. This mobility paradoxically made the weaker urban guerrilla force the attacker, as Marighella stated "the urban guerrilla, although weaker, is undoubtedly the attacker."

=== Preliminary assaults and raids ===
As part of the urban guerrilla "learning process," Marighella advocated preliminary assaults and raids on targets like armored cars, planes, boats and especially banks. These hit-and-run raids would serve as training grounds while also furthering the guerrillas' aims.

== See also ==
- Armed Insurrection
