= Frei Tito =

Brazilian Dominican friar (1945–1974)

Frei Tito OP
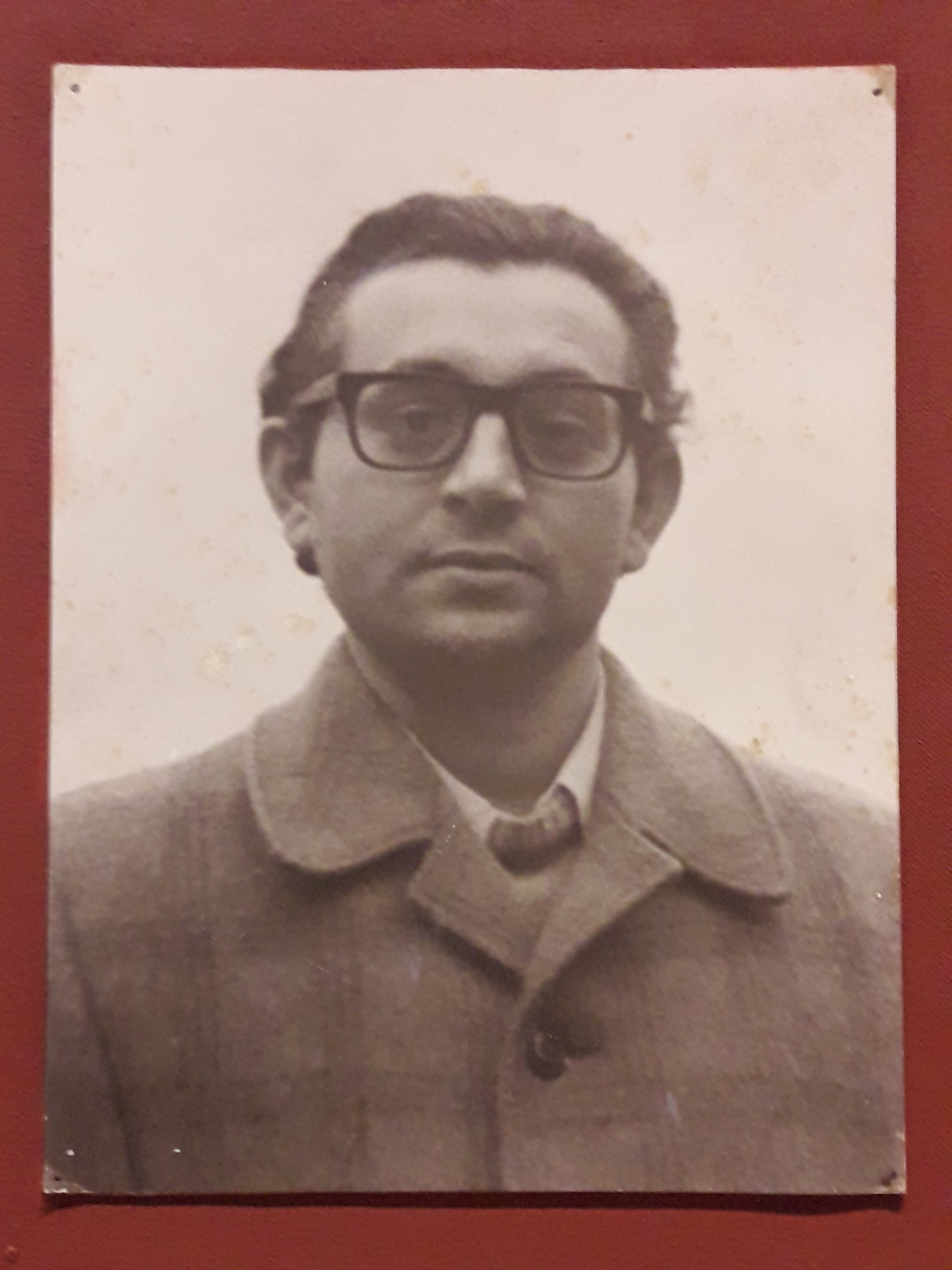
- Born: Tito de Alencar Lima; 14 September 1945; Fortaleza, Ceará, [Brazil
- Died: 10 August 1974 (aged 28); Sainte Marie de La Tourette, Éveux, France
- Cause of death: Suicide by hanging
- Occupation: Roman Catholic friar

Tito de Alencar Lima, O.P. (better known as Frei Tito; 14 September 1945 – 10 August 1974) was a Brazilian Dominican friar who was severely tortured during his country's rule by a military dictatorship. This torture eventually led to his suicide.

== Biography ==
Lima was born in 1945 in Fortaleza to Ildefonso Rodrigues Lima and Laura de Alencar. He later studied at Liceu do Ceará high school, where he was active in the Association of Catholic Students movement, which was the youth branch of Catholic Action. He became the regional director of the movement in 1963 and went to live in Recife. The following year, he became active in the growing resistance and demonstrations against the military government which had seized control of the country.

In 1966 Lima was accepted into the novitiate of the Dominican Order in Belo Horizonte. He completed this stage of initiation in the Order on 10 February of the following year. He was then sent to study Philosophy at USP, the University of São Paulo, living in the Perdizes Convent of the Dominican Order in São Paulo.

In October 1968, Lima was arrested for the first time by forces of the dictatorship for participating in the XX Congress of the National Union of Students in Ibiúna, São Paulo.

On November 4, 1969, Lima was arrested along with several other members of the Dominican Order, such as Frei Betto, by political police officer Sérgio Paranhos Fleury of the Department of Political and Social Order (DOPS, Portuguese: Departamento de Ordem Política e Social). During approximately a whole month, he was severely tortured in the headquarters of DOPS, before being taken to the Tiradentes military garrison.

In early 1970, at the height of the repression, Lima was tortured in the headquarters of the DOPS as a part of the Bandeirantes Operation (which consisted of the financing of torture by high-profile businessmen). In prison, he wrote a letter about his torture which became a symbol in the human rights movement.

In 1971, Lima was deported to Chile and, fearing for his life with the fall of Salvador Allende, he fled to Italy. In Rome, he was unable to find support from the Catholic Church, as he was considered a "terrorist friar". He then moved to Paris, where he was welcomed by the community of Dominican friars at the new Couvent Saint-Jacques.

At this point, Lima's mental health was very unstable as a result of the torture he suffered in Brazil. The abuses led him to persecution mania; he constantly feared a re-encounter with Fleury and his other torturers. He submitted to psychiatric treatment, but the psychological suffering he had endured led him to hang himself on August 10, 1974.

== Movie ==
The movie Batismo de Sangue (Baptism of Blood) tells the story of Tito and other priests' torture during the military regime.

== See also ==
- Frei Betto
- Sister Maurina
- Baptism of Blood (film)
- Cidadão Boilesen (2009)
