= Anjos do Sol =

- Directed by: Rudi Lagemann
- Written by: Rudi Lagemann
- Starring: Antonio Calloni; Otávio Augusto; Darlene Glória; Vera Holtz
- Cinematography: Tuca Moraes
- Edited by: Leo Alves; Felipe Lacerda; Rudi Lagemann
- Distributed by: Globo Filmes
- Release date: 16 August 2006 (Brazil)
- Running time: 92 minutes
- Country: Brazil
- Language: Portuguese
- Budget: R$ 1,500,000

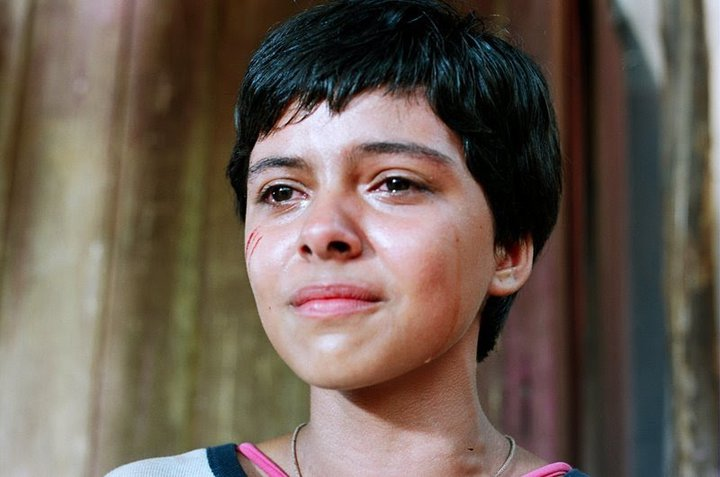
Fernanda Carvalho, as Maria in Anjos do Sol

Anjos do Sol (English: Angels of the Sun) is a 2006 Brazilian film directed by Rudi Lagemann. The film had its world premiere at the Miami International Film Festival, winning the Audience Awards. Anjos do Sol won Best Picture Award at 34º Gramado Film Festival.

== Cast ==
- Antônio Calloni as Saraiva
- Chico Diaz as Tadeu
- Darlene Glória as Vera
- Otávio Augusto as Lourenço
- Vera Holtz as Nazaré
- Fernanda Carvalho as Maria
- Bianca Comparato as Inês
- Caco Monteiro as Tonho
- Mary Sheyla as Celeste
