= Maurina Borges da Silveira =

Brazilian religious sister and torture victim (1926–2011)

- Born: 1926; Perdizinha, Perdizes, Minas Gerais, Brazil
- Died: 2011 (aged 84–85); São Paulo, Brazil
- Occupation: Roman Catholic Franciscan Sister

Sister Maurina O.S.F. (1926–2011), born Maurina Borges da Silveira, was a Brazilian Roman Catholic Franciscan Sister. She was the only Religious Sister to be arrested and tortured during the period of Brazil's military dictatorship (1964–1985).

== Early life ==
Silveira was born into a humble family in Minas Gerais. She was raised in the community of Perdizinha, in the municipality of Perdizes, between Uberaba and Araxá. Perdizinha is a cluster of 50 houses built around a chapel, where there was Mass once a month and praying the rosary every Sunday. Her father, Antonio, a devout Catholic, worked as a carpenter dedicated to the construction of bullock carts. Altogether, the family consisted of 11 siblings, four of whom entered religious orders. Maurina discovered her religious inclination at age 7, after her father told her the story of Saint Francis of Assisi, an enthusiast of religious life for women. At age 14, she convinced her parents to let her join the convent in Araxá.

== Arrest ==
In October 1969, Sister Maurina, then head of Lar Santana Orphanage in Ribeirão Preto, São Paulo, was arrested. She was leasing, without her knowledge, a room of the orphanage to members of the guerrilla group Forças Armadas de Libertação Nacional (FALN). She was arrested, along with several members of FALN by Operação Bandeirantes (OBAN) officers, and tortured for five months. Among other things, she was stripped naked, given electric shocks, and hung on the pau-de-arara torture device, in addition to being cursed, insulted, and threatened.

The arrest of Sister Maurina outraged many members of the Catholic community. Frei (Friar) Felíx Vasconcellos, O.F.M., then Archbishop of Ribeirão Preto, excommunicated two police commissioners working for the regime's repressive system. Cardinal Paulo Evaristo Arns, O.F.M., then Archbishop of São Paulo, said that it was the arrest of Sister Maurina that led him to publicly speak out against the dictatorship.

Some authors, such as Jacob Gorender, in his book Combate nas Trevas (Fighting in the Darkness), claim that Sister Maurina was raped in prison. Sister Maurina, however, denies this claim. According to her, she was a victim of "moral violence", such as when she was forced to sign a document stating that she was the mistress of a communist militant. Gordender says his claim was based on declarations made by FALN members.

On 1970, after five months of illegal detainment, Sister Maurina was released after she was exchanged for Japanese Consul Nobuo Okuchi, kidnapped by the Vanguarda Popular Revolucionária (VPR). She was forced into exile on Mexico, where she lived for 14 years. There, she worked in the State of Mexico, assisting poor rural workers.

== Allegations of pregnancy ==
After the dictatorship, some sensationalistic newspapers published reports that Sister Maurina allegedly had obtained an abortion after getting pregnant by Commissioner Sérgio Paranhos Fleury, who had raped her. These claims, though denied by both Sister Maurina and Cardinal Arns, served as the basis for the 1977 play Milagre na Cela (English: Miracle in the cell), written by playwright Jorge Andrade.

The event that generated the allegation of rape was later clarified by Sister Maurina herself. According to her, a tall, blonde officer once entered her cell and started to passionately hug her, saying that he had not seen his wife for a long time. The Sister claims that she told him to back down, and then he picked up a pistol and wanted her to hold it, in order to get her fingerprints on the gun.

== Final years ==
Until her death in 2011, Sister Maurina continued her vocation of caring for the poor in the São Paulo municipality of Catanduva. She divided her life between religious meetings and social care work to needy children in the city, where she resided since 1984. About her torture in the past, she declared the following: "I do not like to talk about it, I have already forgiven them all".

== See also ==
- Frei Betto
- Frei Tito
