= A Intrusa =

1979 film directed by Carlos Hugo Christensen

- Directed by: Carlos Hugo Christensen
- Screenplay by: Carlos Hugo Christensen; Ubirajara Raffo Constant; Orígenes Lessa
- Based on: "La intrusa" by Jorge Luis Borges
- Produced by: Carlos Hugo Christensen
- Cinematography: Antônio Gonçalves
- Edited by: Jayme Justo
- Music by: Astor Piazzolla
- Production company: Carlos Hugo Christensen Produções Cinematográficas
- Distributed by: Embrafilme
- Release date: December 29, 1979
- Running time: 100 minutes
- Country: Brazil
- Language: Portuguese

A Intrusa is a 1979 Brazilian drama film directed by Carlos Hugo Christensen, based on the short story "La intrusa" by Jorge Luis Borges. The film is about the parallel lives of two gaucho brothers with Danish ancestry. It was shot in Uruguaiana, Rio Grande do Sul.

== Cast ==
- José de Abreu as Christian
- Arlindo Barreto as Eduardo
- Maria Zilda Bethlem as Juliana
- Palmira Barbosa as Efigênia
- Fernando de Almeida as João Iberra
- Ricardo Marnick
- Mauricio Loyola
- Heloísa Gadel
- Nelson Pinto Bastos
- Hermes Lago

== Reception ==
At the 1980 Gramado Film Festival the film won four Golden Kikito awards, including Best Director, Best Actor (José de Abreu), Best Cinematography (Antônio Gonçalves) and Best Music (Astor Piazzolla), and was also nominated for Best Film.
