= Carlos Marighella =

Brazilian politician, writer, and guerrilla fighter

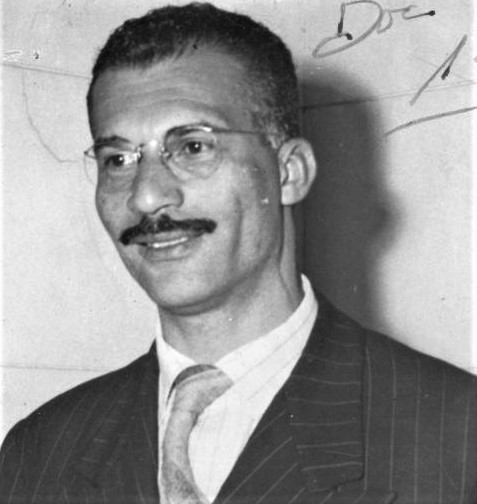

Member of the Chamber of Deputies
- In office 5 February 1946 – 10 January 1948 (Note: Term extinct of the 38th Legislature on 10 January 1946 due to Law no. 211 of 7 January 1948, Article 2 and in the terms of the Director's Board Act of the Chamber of Deputies of 10 January 1948.)
- Constituency: Bahia

Personal details
- Born: 5 December 1911 Salvador, Bahia, Brazil
- Died: 4 November 1969 (aged 57) São Paulo, Brazil
- Cause of death: Assassination
- Resting place: Cemitério Público da Quinta dos Lázaros, Salvador, Bahia
- Party: Brazilian Communist Party (1932–1964)
- Spouse: Clara Charf (m. 1948)
- Domestic partner(s): Elza Sento Sé; Zilda Xavier Pereira
- Children: Carlos Augusto
- Parents: Augusto Marighella (father); Maria Rita do Nascimento (mother)
- Occupation: Politician, guerrilla fighter, poetist, professor
- Organization: ALN (1964–1969)

Carlos Marighella (Brazilian Portuguese: [ˈkaʁluz ˌmaɾiˈɡɛlɐ]; 5 December 1911 – 4 November 1969) was a Brazilian politician, writer, and Marxist–Leninist militant. Critical of nonviolent resistance to the Brazilian military dictatorship, he founded the Ação Libertadora Nacional, a Marxist–Leninist urban guerrilla group, which was responsible for a series of bank robberies and high-profile kidnappings. He was killed by police in 1969 in an ambush. Marighella's most famous contribution to revolutionary literature was the Minimanual of the Urban Guerrilla.

== Biography ==
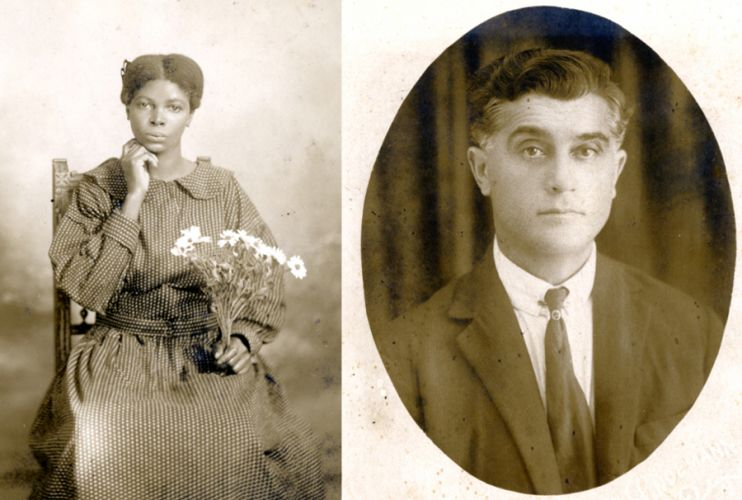
Marighella's parents.

Marighella was born in Salvador, Bahia, to Italian immigrant Augusto Marighella and Afro-Brazilian Maria Rita do Nascimento. His father was a blue-collar worker originally from Emilia, while his mother was a descendant of enslaved Africans, brought from the Sudan (Hausa blacks). He spent his young life at a house in Rua do Desterro, at the Baixa do Sapateiro neighbourhood, where he would graduate from primary and secondary education. In 1934, he left the Polytechnic School of Bahia, where he was pursuing a degree in civil engineering, in order to become an active member of the Brazilian Communist Party (PCB). He then moved to Rio de Janeiro to work in the restructuring of PCB.

Son of an Italian Roman Catholic father and a mother of African Muslim background, Carlos was raised in a Catholic household, eventually becoming atheist in his early 20s.

== Arrests ==
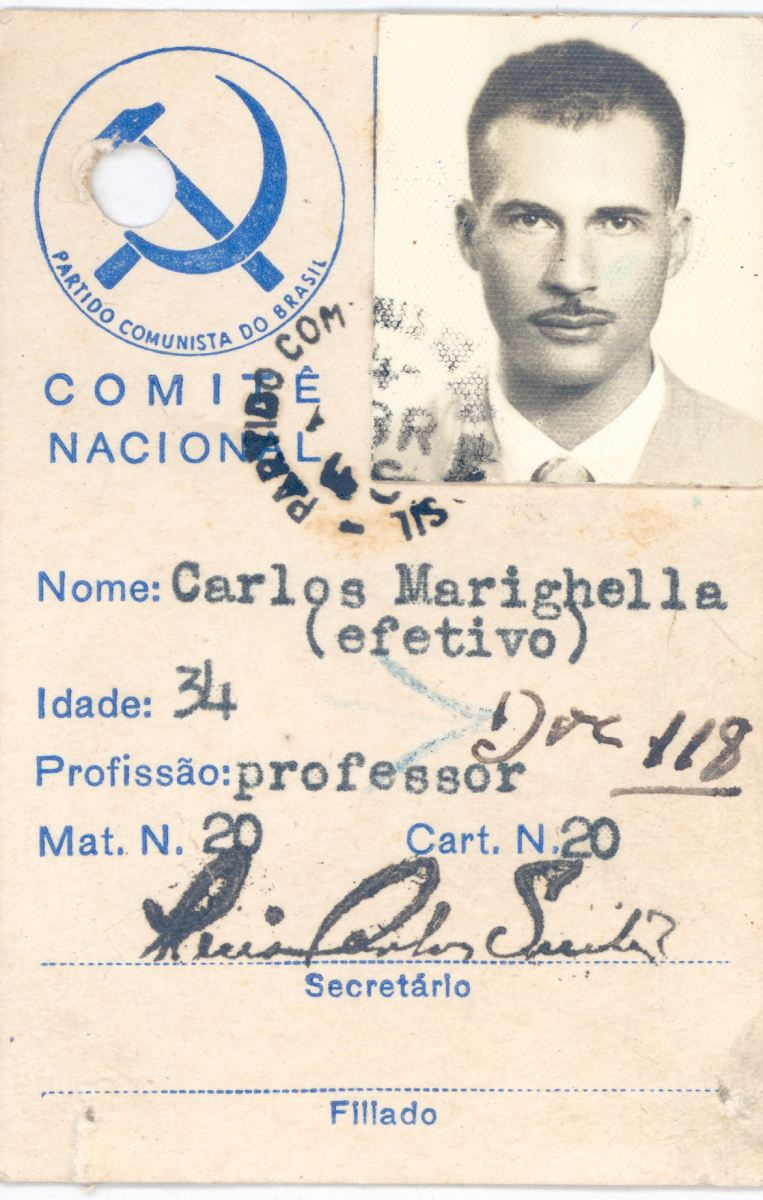
Marighella's PCB card, issued during the party's brief period of legality

Marighella was first arrested in 1932, after he wrote an offensive poem about the administration of Bahia intervener Juracy Magalhães. On 1 May 1936, during the Getúlio Vargas time in presidency, he was once again arrested for subversion by the political police led by Filinto Müller. He remained in jail for a year. He was released by "macedada" (the measure which freed political prisoners without pressing charges against them). After his release, he once again entered clandestinity, along with all members of PCB. He was recaptured in 1939. He was not released until 1945, when an amnesty during the democratization process of the country benefited all political prisoners.

The following year, Marighella was elected constituent federal deputy by the Bahian branch of PCB, but he lost his office in 1948 under the new proscription of the party. Back in clandestinity, he occupied several offices in the leadership of the party. Invited by the Central Committee of the Chinese Communist Party, Marighella visited China between 1953 and 1954 in order to learn more about the Chinese Communist Revolution. In May 1964, after the military coup, he was shot and arrested by agents of the Department of Political and Social Order (Departamento de Ordem Política e Social - DOPS), the political police, at a movie theater in Rio. He was released in the following year by a court order.

== Writing ==
In 1966, he wrote The Brazilian Crisis, opting for the armed struggle against the military dictatorship. Later that year, he renounced his office in the national leadership of PCB.

In August 1967, he participated at the 1st Conference of Latin American Solidarity in Havana, contradicting what party had determined. In Havana, he wrote Some Questions About the Guerrillas in Brazil, dedicated to the memory of Che Guevara and made public by Jornal do Brasil on 5 September 1968. That same year he was expelled from PCB, and founded the Ação Libertadora Nacional (ALN) in February 1968.

== Ação Libertadora Nacional ==
The Department of Political and Social Order (DOPS) attributed the assassination of Charles Rodney Chandler to Marighella and nine others according to the Folha da Tarde at the time.

=== 1969 kidnapping of the United States Ambassador ===
In September 1969, ALN members kidnapped the U.S. ambassador Charles Burke Elbrick in a coordinated move with the Revolutionary Movement 8th October (Movimento Revolucionário 8 de Outubro – MR-8). The group was responsible for several executions as well.

== Assassination ==
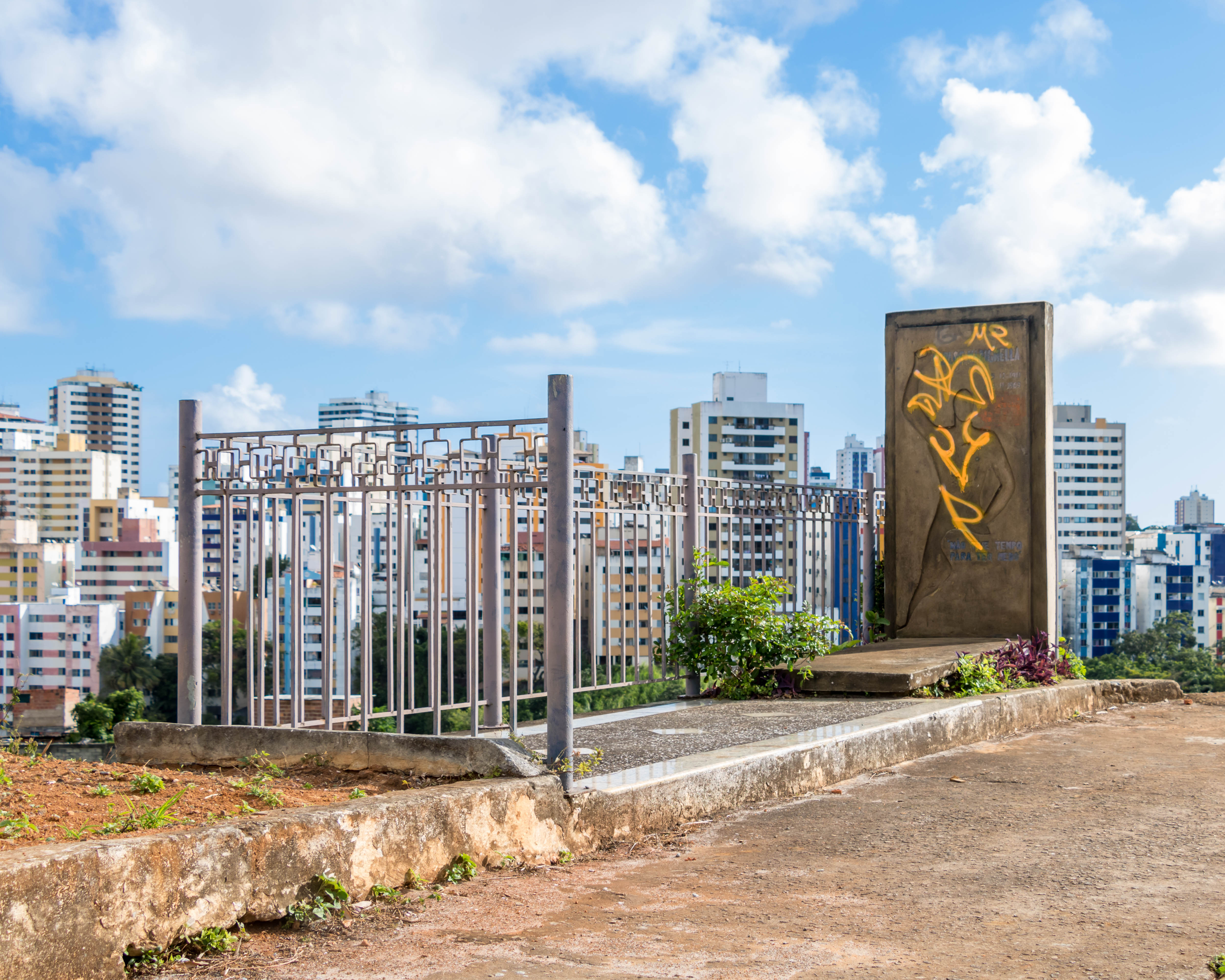
Vandalised tombstone of Marighella, Cemitério Público da Quinta dos Lázaros, Salvador, Bahia, designed by the modernist architect Oscar Niemeyer.

After a series of successful robberies and kidnappings, the police force was determined to eliminate him. He was shot by police at an ambush at 8:00 pm on 4 November 1969 at 800 Alameda Casa Branca, São Paulo. This ambush was organized by police deputy Sérgio Paranhos Fleury, known for his work inside DOPS.

Marighella was buried at Cemitério Público da Quinta dos Lázaros, a cemetery in Salvador, Bahia. His tombstone was designed by architect Oscar Niemeyer, and is the only grave monument designed by the architect. It bears a quote from Marighella: "I didn't have time to be afraid" (Não tive tempo para ter medo).

== Legacy ==
Marighella's most famous contribution to revolutionary struggle literature was the Minimanual of the Urban Guerrilla, consisting of advice on how to disrupt and overthrow a military regime as part of a Marxist revolution. Written shortly before his death in late 1969 in São Paulo, Minimanual was first published in North America by the Berkeley Tribe in Berkeley, California in July 1970 in an English edition.

== In popular culture ==
Marighella was portrayed by Geraldo Del Rey in the 1987 Brazilian drama film Dedé Mamata.

In the 2006 biographical drama film Baptism of Blood, Marighella was portrayed by Brazilian actor and musician Marku Ribas.

In the 2019 drama Marighella, Marighella was portrayed by Seu Jorge; the film was accomplished actor Wagner Moura's directorial debut. The movie was exhibited at international film festivals, but Brazil's Agência Nacional do Cinema (National Agency of Cinema), during Bolsonaro's government, barred it from distribution in Brazil, citing "subversive elements"; it finally appeared on Brazilian screens in November, 2021.
