= Boca (2010 film) =

2010 film directed by Flavio Frederico

- Written by: Flavio Frederico; Mariana Pamplona
- Starring: Daniel de Oliveira; Hermila Guedes; Jefferson Brasil
- Cinematography: Adrian Teijido
- Edited by: Vânia Debs
- Music by: Eduardo Bid
- Distributed by: Nossa Distribuidora
- Release dates: 2 October 2010 (Rio de Janeiro International Film Festival); 28 September 2012 (Brazil)
- Running time: 100 minutes
- Country: Brazil
- Language: Portuguese
- Budget: R$ 3,000,000

Boca is a 2010 Brazilian crime-drama film directed by Flavio Frederico. The film was screened at the 2010 Festival do Rio.

Inspired by the autobiography of Hiroto de Moraes Joanide (played by Daniel de Oliveira), the film is set in the Boca do Lixo, a prostitution zone in São Paulo during the 1950s and 1960s.

== Cast ==
- Daniel de Oliveira as Hiroito
- Hermila Guedes as Alaíde
- Jefferson Brasil as Nelsinho
- Milhem Cortaz as Osmar
- Paulo César Peréio as Dr. Honório
- Maxwell Nascimento as Robertinho
- Camila Lecciolli as Clarinha
- Juliana Galdino as Telma
- Leandra Leal as Silvia
- Claudio Jaborandy as Carlito
