= Volta por Cima =

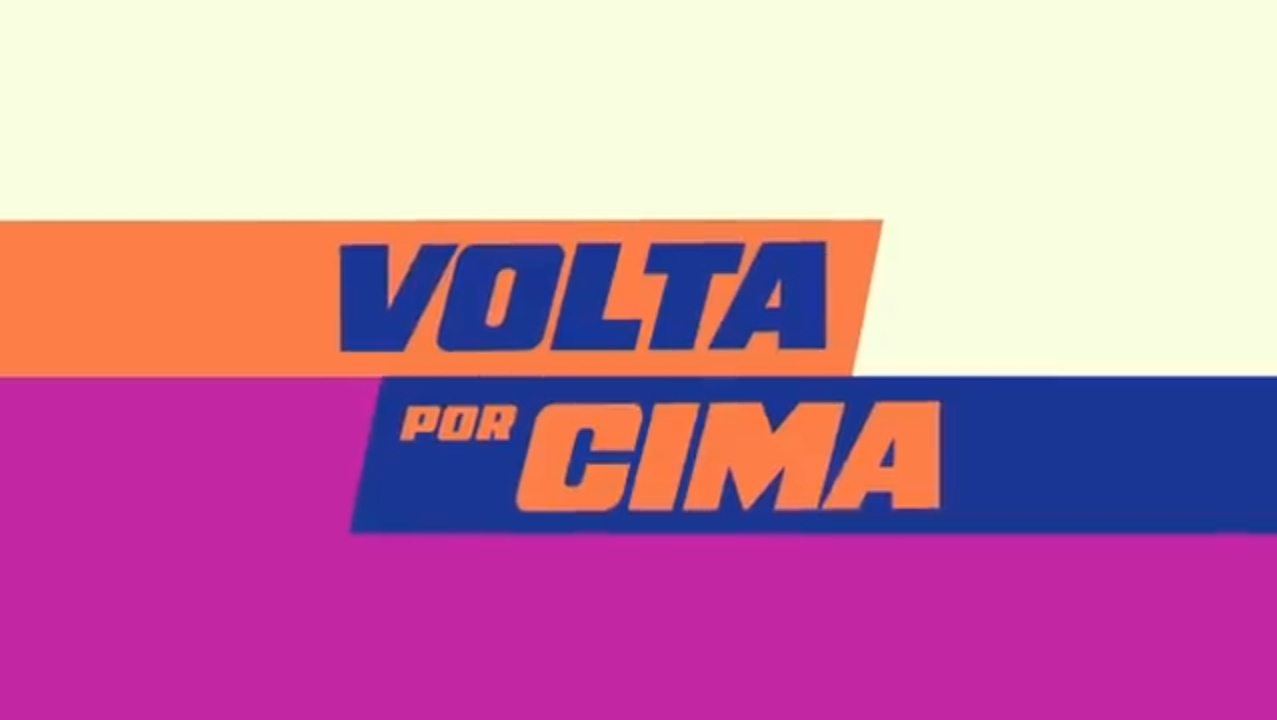
- Genre: Telenovela
- Created by: Claudia Souto
- Written by: Wendell Bendelack; Julia Laks; Isadora Wilkinson; Juliana Peres
- Directed by: André Câmara
- Starring: Jéssica Ellen; Fabrício Boliveira; Amaury Lorenzo; Isadora Cruz; Tereza Seiblitz; Isabel Teixeira; Milhem Cortaz; Betty Faria
- Theme music composer: Paulo Vanzolini
- Opening theme: "Volta por Cima" by Ludmilla ft. Alcione Nazareth
- Country of origin: Brazil
- Original language: Portuguese
- No. of seasons: 1
- No. of episodes: 180

Production
- Producers: Andrea Kelly; Lucas Zardo
- Production company: Estúdios Globo

Original release
- Network: TV Globo
- Release: 30 September 2024 – 26 April 2025

Volta por Cima is a Brazilian telenovela created by Claudia Souto. It aired on TV Globo from 30 September 2024 to 26 April 2025. The telenovela stars Jéssica Ellen, Fabrício Boliveira, Amaury Lorenzo, Isadora Cruz, Tereza Seiblitz, Isabel Teixeira, Milhem Cortaz and Betty Faria.

== Plot ==
Madá is a young woman who lives with her parents, Lindomar, a bus driver for Viação Formosa, and Doralice, a seamstress, along with her teenage sister, Tati, and her laid-back uncle, Osmar, in the fictional Vila Cambucá, a suburban neighborhood of Rio de Janeiro. Also living there is Jão, a bus inspector and Lindomar's coworker. He was raised by his mother, Neuza, who hides the identity of his father, and struggles to change his life, graduating in business administration. Although they share a strong will to keep fighting amidst difficulties, Madá and Jão don't get along and are constantly in conflict, until a tragedy changes their lives.

About to retire, Lindomar suffers a heart attack while driving a bus, in Madá's presence, causing an accident that could have been worse without Jão's intervention. The event improves their relationship and reveals a possible mutual attraction. However, Madá maintains a lukewarm engagement with Chico, her childhood sweetheart who cheats on her with Roxelle, a lively and ambitious gold digger. Jão, even though considered a hero, is despised by the owner of Viação Formosa, Edson Bacelar, and clashes with him and his wife, the powerful former samba queen Rosana, without knowing that Edson might be his father.

Lindomar ends up dying in the hospital. With the loss of her father and her mother's fragile health, Madá takes on the role of head of the household, reinventing herself as a party planner and facing difficulties in keeping up with the household bills. The family's problems would be solved if it weren't for the betrayal of Osmar, who secretly takes possession of a winning lottery ticket worth 5 million reals bought by Lindomar before he died.

== Cast ==
- Jéssica Ellen as Madalena "Madá" Souza
- Fabrício Boliveira as Jorge "Jão"
- Amaury Lorenzo as Francisco "Chico" Moreira
- Isadora Cruz as Roxelle
- Tereza Seiblitz as Doralice Souza
- Milhem Cortaz as Osmarino "Osmar" Souza
- Isabel Teixeira as Violeta Castilho
- Drica Moraes as Joyce Góis de Macedo
- Betty Faria as Belisa Góis de Macedo
- Juliana Alves as Aparecida "Cida"
- Aílton Graça as Edson Bacelar
- Viviane Araújo as Rosana Bacelar
- Tonico Pereira as Eurico Moreira "Seu Moreira"
- Rodrigo García as Renato Castilho "Baixinho"
- Juliano Cazarré as Jayme
- Cláudia Missura as Tereza
- Rodrigo Fagundes as Gilberto Góis de Macedo "Gigi"
- Lellê as Sílvia "Silvinha" Pires de Sabóia
- Valdineia Soriano as Neuza
- Enrique Díaz as Gerson
- Fábio Lago as Sebastian
- Iara Jamra as Ana Lúcia
- Adanilo as Sidney
- Jacqueline Sato as Yuki
- Allan Jeon as Jin Kwon
- Bia Santana as Tatiana "Tati" Souza
- Gabriela Dias as Miranda
- Pri Helena as Cacá
- Vitor Sampaio as Jô
- Márcio Machado as Henrique "Rique" Nunes
- Chao Chen as Alberto Fontoura
- Gabriela Yoon as Yoo-Na
- Sharon Cho as Mi-rae/Seo Ha-na
- João Gabriel D'Aleluia as Fernando "Nando" Bacelar
- Caíque Ivo as Lucas

=== Guest stars ===
- MV Bill as Lindomar Souza

== Production ==
Originally, Mauro Wilson's unpublished drama Conta Comigo was to be the replacement for Família é Tudo in the seven o'clock slot, as announced at the TV Globo's 2024 Upfront event, held on 18 October 2023. However, in February 2024, the drama was shelved by the broadcaster, claiming that the main premise, with one of the antagonists coming to power after being elected to political office and becoming corrupted in the process, could have negative repercussions, since the plot would premiere in the middle of the municipal elections. Originally scheduled to air in 2025, the broadcaster decided to fast-track Claudia Souto's drama to replace Família é Tudo. André Câmara was chosen by Souto to be the director of the telenovela. The telenovela was tentatively titled Mão Dupla, but the title was later changed to Volta por Cima. Filming began on 2 July 2024, with Ilha do Governador as one of the backdrops.

== Ratings ==
| Season | Episodes | First aired | | Last aired | | Avg. viewers (points) |
| Season | Episodes | Date | Viewers (points) | Date | Viewers (points) | Avg. viewers (points) |
|---|---|---|---|---|---|---|
| 1 | 180 | 30 September 2024 | 21.2 | 26 April 2025 | 19.9 | 19.7 |
