= Lopes Trovão =

Brazilian doctor, journalist, and politician

- Lopes Trovão in 1882

Senator for the Federal District
- In office 31 August 1895 – 14 November 1902
- Preceded by: Saldanha Marinho
- Succeeded by: Lauro Sodré

Member of the Chamber of Deputies
- In office 15 November 1890 – 1895
- Constituency: Federal District

Personal details
- Born: 23 May 1848 Angra dos Reis, Empire of Brazil
- Died: 16 July 1925 (aged 77) Rio de Janeiro, Brazil
- Party: Republican Party
- Education: Faculty of Medicine of Rio de Janeiro
- Occupation: Physician, journalist, politician

José Lopes da Silva Trovão, better known as Lopes Trovão (May 23, 1848 – July 17, 1925), was a Brazilian physician, journalist, and politician.

He was the son of Portuguese diplomats José Maria dos Reis Lopes Trovão and Maria Jacinta Lopes Trovão. He supported the Republican Manifesto of 1870 and was a noted orator, speaking out against the monarchy and slavery. Lopes Trovão served in the chamber of deputies between 1891 and 1895. He was a senator from 1895 to 1902.

He worked on a design for the Brazilian flag which was first presented in November 1889. It was adopted for four days and became known as the Provisional Flag of the Republic. Ultimately it was rejected as too similar to the U.S. flag upon which it was based.

In his later years, Trovão served on the executive boards of several newspapers. He died in Rio de Janeiro in 1925. A school was named after him in 1908. A medal is awarded in his name, presented in his hometown of Angra dos Reis.

== Publications ==
- Trovão, Lopes. Le Vicomte de Rio Branco, Joseph Marie da Silva Paranhos 16 Mars, 1819. 1 Er Novembre - 1880. Extrait de La 'Chronique Franco - Brésilienne' Número 5, Paris, 16 Novembre 1885.
