= Daniel de Oliveira (actor) =

Brazilian actor (born 1977)

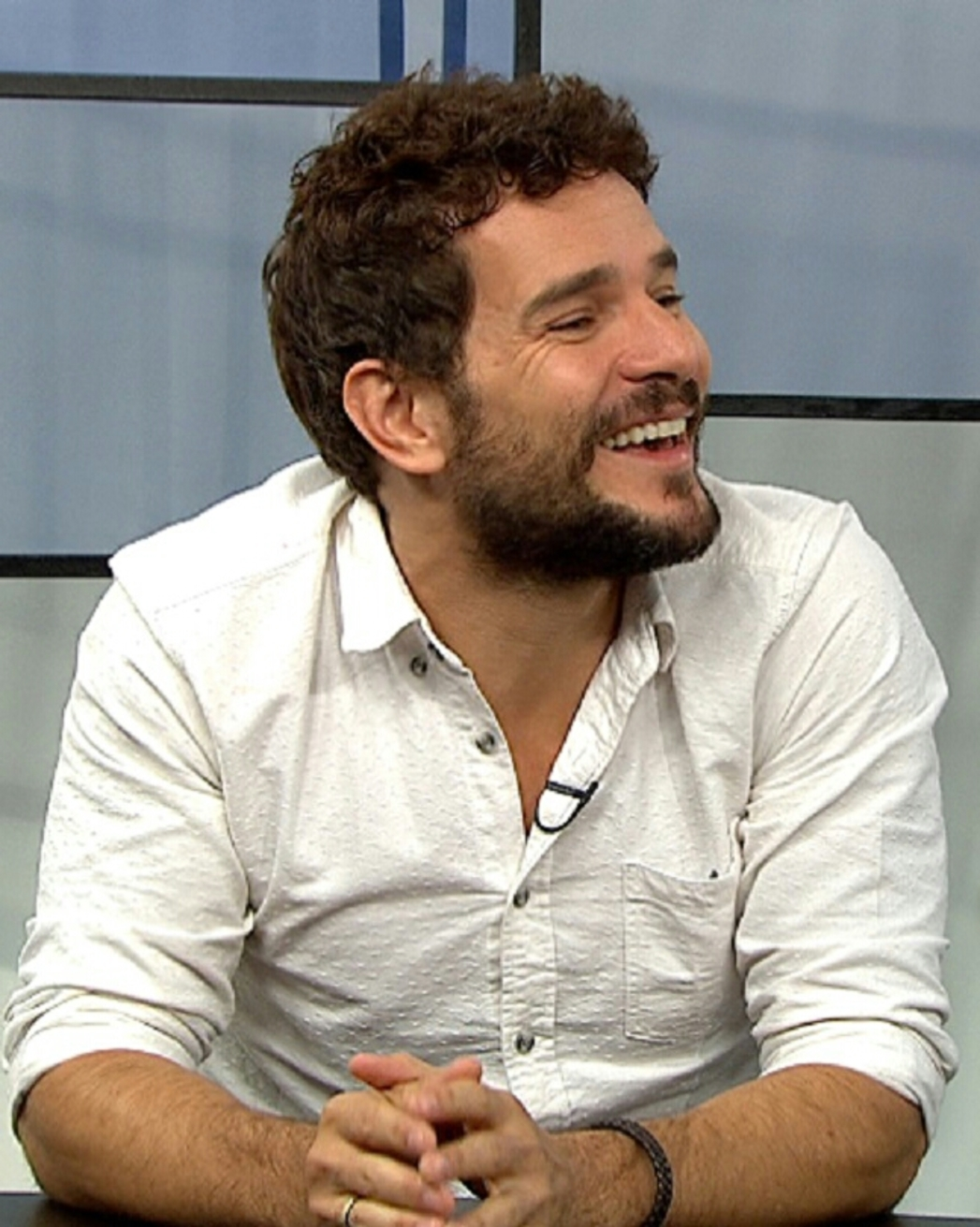
- Oliveira in 2015
- Born: 19 June 1977 (age 48); Belo Horizonte, Minas Gerais, Brazil
- Occupation: Actor
- Years active: 1998–present
- Spouses: Vanessa Giácomo (m. 2009; div. 2012) Sophie Charlotte (m. 2015; div. 2024)
- Children: 3

Daniel de Oliveira (born 19 June 1977) is a Brazilian actor.

== Personal life ==
He was married to Brazilian actress Vanessa Giácomo from 2004 to 2012. They have two children. In 2014, he began dating actress Sophie Charlotte. They married in 2015 and have one son.

He is known for being a fanatical supporter of Atlético Mineiro, showing his love for the team on different occasions, such as winning the 2013 Copa Libertadores and the 2021 Campeonato Brasileiro.

== Filmography ==
=== Films ===
- 2000 - O Circo das Qualidades Humanas - Bosco
- 2004 - Cazuza - O Tempo Não Pára - Cazuza
- 2004 - A Dona Da História - Paulinho Oliveira (special participation)
- 2005 - Chicken Little (Brazilian voice dubbing)
- 2006 - Zuzu Angel - Stuart Angel
- 2006 - 14 Bis - Alberto Santos-Dumont
- 2006 - Baptism of Blood - Frei Betto
- 2006 - Happy Feet - Mumble (Brazilian voice dubbing)
- 2009 - A Festa Da Menina Morta - Santinho
- 2010 - 400 Contra 1 - Uma História do Crime Organizado -
- 2010 - 31 minutos, la película - Juanín (Brazilian voice dubbing)
- 2011 - Gnomeo & Juliet - Gnomeo (Brazilian voice dubbing)
- 2011 - Happy Feet Two - Mano (Brazilian voice dubbing)
- 2012 - Boca - Hiroito de Moraes Joanides
- 2013 - Latitudes - José
- 2013 - Road 47 - Gumarães
- 2014 - Blue Blood
- 2018 - Aos Teus Olhos - Rubens
- 2018 - 10 Segundos Para Vencer - Éder Jofre

=== Theater ===
- Alice no País das Maravilhas (Alice's Adventures in Wonderland) - Belo Horizonte
- O Sítio do Picapau Amarelo - Belo Horizonte
- Lucrécia, o veneno dos Bórgias - Belo Horizonte
- Êxtase - Rio de Janeiro

=== Soap operas ===
- 1998 - Brida
- 1999 - Malhação - Marcos Almeida (Marquinhos)
- 2001 - A Padroeira - Priest Gregório
- 2004 - Um Só Coração - Bernardo
- 2004 - Cabocla - Luís Jerônimo
- 2005 - Hoje É Dia de Maria - Quirino
- 2005 - Hoje É Dia de Maria (second phase) - 10 different characters
- 2006 - Cobras & Lagartos - Daniel Salgado Miranda (Duda)
- 2007 - Desejo Proibido - Henrique
- 2009 - Som & Fúria - Jacques Maia
- 2009 - Decamerão - A Comédia do Sexo - Filipinho
- 2010 - Passione - Agnello Mattoli
- 2011 - A História do Amor - 64 different characters
- 2016 - Nada Será Como Antes - Otaviano Azevedo Gomes
- 2021 - Onde Está Meu Coração - Miguel Freitas
- 2025 - Guerreiros do Sol - Idálio
- 2026 - Coração Acelerado - Alaor "Alaorzinho" Sampaio Amaral Filho

== Awards ==
- Prêmio Qualidade Brasil - Best cinema actor (2004) for Cazuza - O tempo não pára
- Grande prêmio Tam de cinema Brasileiro - Best actor (2004) for Cazuza - O tempo não pára
- Prêmio da APCA - Best cinema actor (2004) for Cazuza - O tempo não pára
- Brazilian Cinema festival in Miami (Festival de Cinema Brasileiro de Miami) - Best actor (2004) for Cazuza - O tempo não pára
- Prêmio ACIE de Cinema - Best actor (2004) for Cazuza - O tempo não pára
- Prêmio BEA (BEA Award) - "Best male revelation of Brazilian Cinema"
- Ibero-Americano LaCinemaFe Cinema festival - for his interpretation - in Cazuza - O Tempo não Pára, by Sandra Werneck and Walter Carvalho.
