= Frei Betto =

Brazilian Dominican friar and philosopher (born 1944)

The Reverend Frei Betto OP
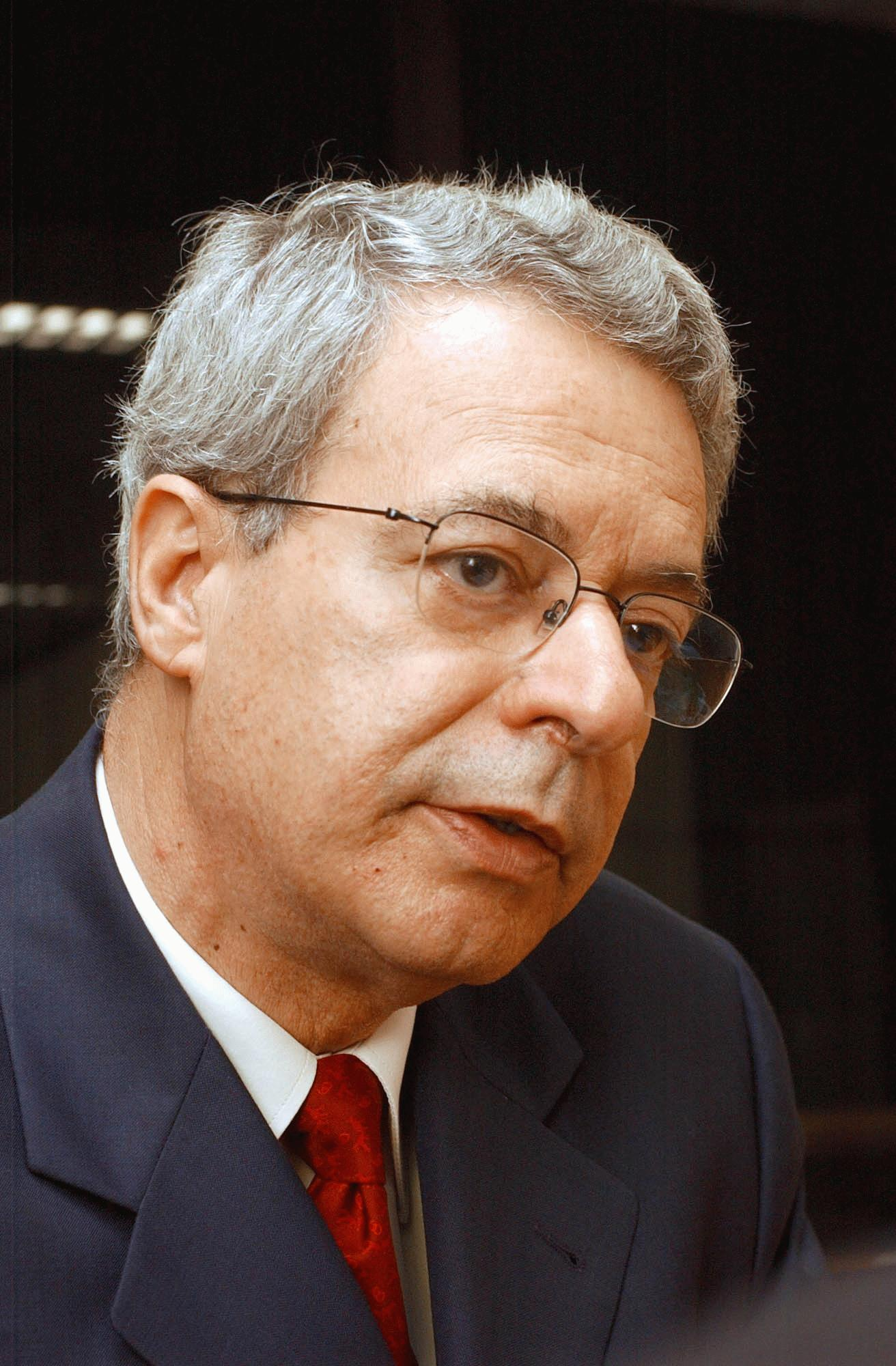
- Born: Carlos Alberto Libânio Christo; 25 August 1944 (age 82); Belo Horizonte, Minas Gerais, Brazil
- Occupations: Dominican friar; priest; writer
- Website: freibetto.org

Carlos Alberto Libânio Christo OP (born 25 August 1944), better known as Frei Betto, is a Brazilian writer, political activist, philosopher, liberation theologian, and Dominican friar.

== Life ==
Frei Betto was born on 25 August 1944 in Belo Horizonte. At the age of 20, when he was a student of journalism, he entered the Dominican Order. He was later imprisoned for four years by the military dictatorship which ruled Brazil for smuggling people out of the country. His incarceration was part of an ongoing series of attacks by the government on activist members of the Catholic Church. These events are depicted in the 2006 biographical drama film Baptism of Blood, based on the book of the same name by Frei Betto. Brazilian actor Daniel de Oliveira portrays Frei Betto in the film.

In addition to work on eliminating hunger in Brazil, Frei Betto is involved in various aspects of Brazil's politics. He worked for the government of Luiz Inácio Lula da Silva, for whom he was considered a spiritual advisor and mentor.

As a liberation theologian, Frei Betto has been involved in various international efforts in order to support an understanding between Marxism and Christianity. During the 1980s, he visited Havana and held frequent and lengthy interviews with Fidel Castro, the result of such talks being a book, Fidel and Religion, where Castro exposed his views on Christianity, something that raised protest among conservatives but is also said to have improved relations between Castro's government and the Cuban Catholic Church.

During Mikhail Gorbachev's Perestroika, Frei Betto was also involved in various efforts aimed at an understanding between leaders of the Russian Orthodox Church and the Communist Party of the Soviet Union, such efforts being described in the form of a travelogue published by him in 1993 in Portuguese, Lost Paradise, which the author dedicates to a certain Theophilus ("God's friend"), apparently the same as the mysterious addressee of the Gospel of Luke, which should be understood as a symbol of all Christians.

== Honors ==
Frei Betto was selected by UNESCO as the 2013 recipient of its International José Martí Prize. The reason given by Irina Bokova, its Director General, was "his exceptional contribution to building a universal culture of peace, social justice and human rights in Latin America and the Caribbean". The prize was awarded on 28 January in Havana, Cuba, at the Third International Conference on World Balance, being held to mark the 160th anniversary of José Martí's birth.
