= Sérgio Paranhos Fleury =

Brazilian police officer (1933–1979)

Sérgio Fernando Paranhos Fleury
- Born: 19 May 1933; Niterói, Brazil
- Died: 1 May 1979 (aged 45) (reportedly); Ilhabela, Brazil
- Occupation: Police deputy
- Employer(s): Department of Political and Social Order
- Known for: Capture and death of Carlos Marighella

Sérgio Fernando Paranhos Fleury (19 May 1933 – reported deceased as of 1 May 1979) was a Brazilian police deputy during the Brazilian military dictatorship. He was chief of DOPS, the Brazilian "Department for Political and Social Order", which had a major role during the years of the Brazilian military government. Fleury was known for his violent temper and was officially accused of torture and homicide of numerous people, but drowned at sea before being tried.

== Activities ==
He became known for his participation in torture and extrajudicial killings during the military regime. Several prisoner reports and witness testimonies indicate that he consistently used torture during interrogations during the time of the military regime.

Fleury was directly involved in the torture of Tito de Alencar Lima, known as "Frei Tito", a Roman Catholic friar who opposed the military regime in Brazil.

Besides using torture, Fleury was investigated and denounced by prosecutors Hélio Bicudo and Dirceu de Mello for murders committed by the Death Squadron. The Public Prosecutor of São Paulo found him to be the main leader of the Death Squadron which was responsible for innumerable extrajudicial killings in Brazil. Although convicted, he did not serve time in prison.

His biography by Brazilian journalist Percival de Souza, titled Autópsia do Medo, details his involvement with torture and several extrajudicial killings.

== Death and legacy ==
According to his wife, he drowned while out on his boat on 1 May 1979.

A street in the city of São Carlos was named after him until 2009, when protests resulted in legislation that changed the name of the street to Frei Tito.

=== Media depictions ===
In the film Marighella, directed by Wagner Moura, actor Bruno Gagliasso plays Inspector Lúcio, a fictionalized version of Fleury, who leads the team responsible for the pursuit and execution of guerrilla fighter Carlos Marighella.

== See also ==
- National Truth Commission
- DOI-CODI
- Operation Condor
