= APCA Award for Best Film =

Brazilian film award

The Troféu APCA for best film is a prize awarded since 1973 by Associação Paulista de Críticos de Arte, for the Brazilian cinematography productions. Winners are announced in December, and the awards ceremony usually takes place in the first quarter of the following year.

== Winners ==
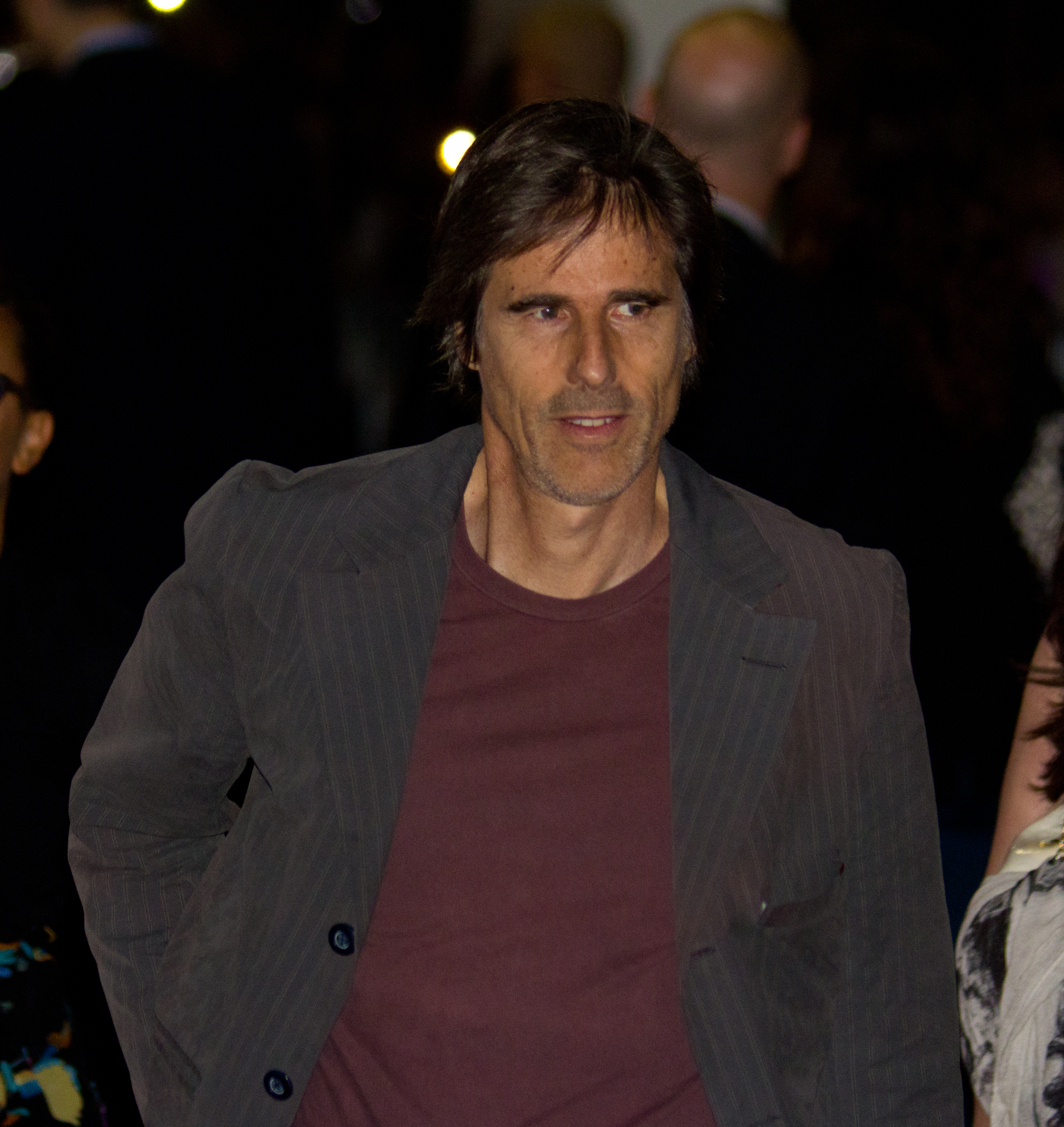
The director Walter Salles twice won the APCA Award for Best Film, in 1999 for Central Station and in 2008 for Linha de Passe.

Year	Original Title	English title	Director
1973	Os Inconfidentes	The Conspirators	Joaquim Pedro de Andrade
1974	Cassy Jones, o Magnífico Sedutor	Cassy Jones, The Magnificent Seductive	Luís Sérgio Person
1975	O Anjo da Noite	The Night Angel	Walter Hugo Khouri
1976	Relatório de Um Homem Casado	Report of a Married Man	Flávio Tambellini
1977	O Predileto	The Favorite	Roberto Palmari
1978	O Seminarista	The seminarian	Geraldo Santos Pereira
1979	Mar de Rosas	Sea of Roses	Ana Carolina
1980	There were no awards.
1981	A Volta do Filho Pródigo	The Return of Prodigal Son	Ipojuca Pontes
1982	Eros, O Deus do Amor	Eros, the God of Love	Walter Hugo Khouri
1983	O Olho Mágico do Amor	The Eye Magic of Love	Ícaro Martins; José Antonio Garcia
1984	Sargento Getúlio	Sergeant Getulio	Hermanno Penna
1985	Memórias do Cárcere	Memoirs of Prison	Nelson Pereira dos Santos
1986	Avaeté - Semente da Vingança	Avaete, Seed of Revenge	Zelito Viana
1987	There were no awards.
1988	There were no awards.
1989	There were no awards.
1990	Festa	Fest	Ugo Giorgetti
1991	Corpo em Delito	The Body in offense	Nuno César de Abreu
1992	Stelinha	The Little Stella	Miguel Faria Jr.
1993	There were no awards.
1994	Conterrâneos Velhos de Guerra	The Old Fellow of War	Vladimir Carvalho
1995	Alma Corsária	Alma Corsair	Carlos Reichenbach
1996	No Rio Amazonas	In the Amazon River	Ricardo Dias
1997	Como Nascem os Anjos	How Angels Are Born	Murilo Salles
1998	A Ostra e o Vento	The Oyster and the Wind	Walter Lima Jr.
1999	Central do Brasil	Central Station	Walter Salles
2000	Santo Forte	Holy Strong	Eduardo Coutinho
2001	Cronicamente Inviável	Chronically Unfeasible	Sergio Bianchi
2002	Bicho de Sete Cabeças	Brainstorm	Laís Bodanzky
2003	O Invasor	The Invader	Beto Brant
2004	O Homem Que Copiava	The Man Who Copied	Jorge Furtado
2005	Entreatos	Entreatos	João Moreira Salles
2005	Peões	Pawns	Eduardo Coutinho
2006	Cinema, Aspirinas e Urubus	Cinema, Aspirins and Vultures	Marcelo Gomes
2007	O Céu de Suely	Suely in the Sky	Karim Aïnouz
2008	Linha de Passe	Linha de Passe	Walter Salles
2008	Serras da Desordem	Saws of Disorder	Andrea Tonacci
2009	A Festa da Menina Morta	The Feast of the Dead Girl	Matheus Nachtergaele
2010	Antes Que o Mundo Acabe	Before the World Ends	Ana Luiza Azevedo
2011	Bróder	Bróder	Jeferson De
2012	A Febre do Rato	Rat Fever	Cláudio Assis
2013	O Som ao Redor	Neighboring Sounds	Kleber Mendonça Filho
2014	Praia do Futuro	Futuro Beach	Karim Aïnouz
2015	Que Horas Ela Volta?		Anna Muylaert
2016	Aquarius	Aquarius	Kleber Mendonça Filho

== See also ==
- Associação Paulista de Críticos de Arte
