= Tiradentes Revolutionary Movement (1961–1962) =

Brazilian clandestine political group

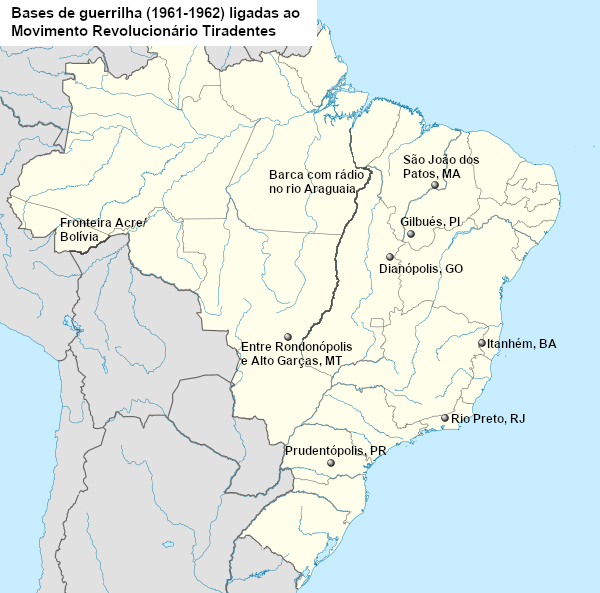
Guerrilla bases operated from 1961 to 1962.

The Tiradentes Revolutionary Movement (MRT) was a clandestine political group linked to the Peasant Leagues and disbanded in 1962. Under the influence of the Cuban Revolution, and together with members of the Leagues, it aimed at a socialist revolution with peasant bases in Brazil. Eight guerrilla bases were created in the country, among which the one in Dianópolis, Goiás (now Rio da Conceição, Tocantins) was discovered at the end of 1962.

In the beginning of the 1960s, the Leagues had radicalized their positions, both the right and part of the Brazilian left saw in the countryside the possibility of a revolution, and the Cuban experience led to the questioning of the theses of the Brazilian Communist Party (PCB), which did not accept armed struggle. With the training of militants and possible financing by Cuba, the guerrilla camps were established at the end of 1961. Francisco Julião, the best known representative of the Leagues, did not have direct participation in the guerrilla war, with Clodomir Santos de Morais as its main leader, but historians debate whether Julião had indirect responsibility.

The militants spent a year in the camps, dispersed throughout the regions of Brazil, but there was little effective military preparation due to internal disputes and lack of resources. The security agencies monitored the movement and the Army, supported by the Goias government, dismantled the Dianópolis device at the end of 1962. During this same period Clodomir de Morais was arrested and documents linking Cuba to the guerrilla movement were found in the wreckage of Varig Flight 810, which crashed in Peru. The guerrilla project, that was already weak, thus reached failure.

Despite its small size, the guerrilla attempt made repercussions in the national press, was taken seriously by authorities in the United States, and contributed to the decline of the Peasant Leagues. The MRT is notable as a precursor, still in the democratic period, of the armed struggle against the Brazilian military dictatorship, with one of its organizations, founded in 1969, adopting the same name.

== Motivations ==
The Peasant Leagues of the 1960s had radiated from the Pernambuco Planters' Agricultural and Livestock Society (SAPPP) of 1955. Organizing thousands of rural workers, they reached their peak under the government of João Goulart, present in 13 Brazilian states. The movement was heterogeneous and "an important actor in the debates on agrarian reform and the Brazilian revolution". The lawyer Francisco Julião, called to defend the SAPPP, became an important representative of the Leagues. At first legalistic in character, they defended agrarian reform within the institutions, through political and judicial action. From 1960 to 1961, this gave way to "agrarian reform by law or by force" and their documents acquired a socialist and revolutionary content. The term "by force", not necessarily excluding "by law", could mean immediate change of the social structure, armed revolution, or collective action through marches, strikes, and land invasions. It existed in a context in which violence was already present in conflicts between peasants and large landowners.

This change occurred due to the influence of the Cuban Revolution, including the visit of Francisco Julião and other figures to Cuba, and, in part due to the different interpretation of Cuban events, the divergence of the Communist Party and its branch in the countryside, the Union of Farmers and Agricultural Workers of Brazil (ULTAB). Cuba was a reference for having had a revolution focused on agrarian reform, occurring in a country, like Brazil, with an "agrarian-exporting society based on latifundium, monoculture and pre-capitalist labor relations in the countryside. His experience opened the way for criticism of the orthodoxy of Latin American Communist Parties, for whom the revolution would have a first bourgeois-democratic stage, without the need for armed struggle, and the peasants would not play a central role. Francisco Julião, unlike the PCB, believed in a revolution initially based in the countryside, immediately socialist and without revolutionary participation of the bourgeoisie. For the Leagues, the role of political vanguard would fall not to a communist party, but to a guerrilla organization, around which the masses would rally.

The direct contact between the Leagues and the Communist Party was made by communists led by Clodomir de Morais, known as the "anti-party" group, which disagreed with the PCB's direction. Clodomir was expelled from the party in 1962 for his participation in the guerrilla project with the Leagues, which came to the attention of the PCB through informants in the Army.

According to Clodomir, the Leagues embraced the guerrilla war for more defensive than offensive reasons: the supply of weapons to the landowners by the governor of São Paulo Adhemar de Barros and the possibilities of an American invasion, with the precedent of the Bay of Pigs invasion, or of an attempted coup d'état, as was already occurring frequently in the country.

It was not only within the Leagues that the rural man was seen as a possible armed revolutionary. So also thought a small part of the Brazilian left, inspired by Maoism and Guevarism, and the right, for whom this radicalization justified the 1964 coup d'état as a defense of legality. The United States government also thought of this possibility, especially in the Northeast, where the Leagues were concentrated, and directed the Alliance for Progress funds to the region. The CIA, situating a Brazilian revolution in the international context, evaluated that Cuba was favorable, but the Soviet Union was opposed.

The inspiration in the Cuban Revolution came not from the peasants – who were largely illiterate, did not see themselves as participants in the Cold War, and were focused on disputes over land and better working conditions – but from Francisco Julião, the Communist Party, and other figures on the left. Still, even among sectors of the Leagues not involved in the military there was a certain degree of sympathy for the guerrilla project.

== Foundation ==
Created in Ouro Preto on 21 April 1962, by Francisco Julião, the MRT was a political organism of the Peasant Leagues, but with a broader base of support than the countryside. Its members were intellectuals and journalists initially engaged in publicizing Julião's work, and then in the guerrilla nuclei, whose founding dated back to the end of the previous year. However, the Movement is also cited as having been organized in 1961.

== Leadership ==
Francisco Julião was the main leader of the Leagues and seen by both the left and the coup plotters' right, "not for nothing", as a possible leader of an armed peasant revolt. However, he did not participate in the implementation of the guerrilla bases and did not even know where they were; this lack of knowledge about their location is confirmed by Clodomir de Morais. Fidel Castro suggested the division of the Leagues into military, political and mass sectors, in hierarchical order. They would be respectively commanded by Adauto Freire da Cruz, Clodomir de Morais and Francisco Julião. Thus, Clodomir, not Julião was the figure involved in the guerrilla war. The military and mass sectors diverged. Julião criticized the pro-guerrilla faction of the Leagues, which in turn did not accept participation in elections, a path already taken by him when he was elected deputy in the 1962 elections. In their testimonies, Julião and Clodomir criticize each other regarding the directions of the Peasant Leagues.

According to Julião in his later writings, he was against the guerrilla war from the beginning and has no responsibility for its preparation. This has already been questioned, as the organization of the camps would not have been possible without his connivance and he spoke in defense of revolutionary solutions, outside the institutions, thus worrying his political enemies and the security agencies. This radicalism, however, may have been only rhetorical and represented the voice of the movement and not his personal opinions.

== Support base ==
=== Within the country ===
The MRT would serve to connect the Peasant Leagues to the urban environment and to the radical left – Communist Party of Brazil (PCdoB), Workers' Policy (Polop), and part of the student movement -, attracting students and intellectuals. They soon became associated with the guerrilla scheme of the Leagues. Among those involved were Wanderley Guilherme dos Santos and Alípio de Freitas. According to Clodomir, the MRT consisted of a "small group of asphalt intellectuals that artificially tried to infiltrate the guerrilla scheme and assault the Leagues' military devices". Alípio de Freitas, on the other hand, defines its social base as that of the Leagues themselves. The penetration obtained among students was minimal.

According to Clodomir, there would be local recruitment and those recruited for guerrilla training were "housewives, fishermen, tailors, miners, students, workers, but the majority were peasants". In the case of Dianópolis, he states that the nucleus was supported by the population, including the freemasons from Barreiras, Natividade and Rio da Conceição, composed of merchants and landowners. Adauto Monteiro da Silva, a member of the Dianópolis device, points out that the recruits were not local residents and there was no intention to train them. The involvement of the freemasons is denied by Hagaús Araújo, a politician from the region. According to him, the local population was attracted by the social services and was unaware of the real intentions of the guerrillas, who were young dreamers and unprepared. For his brother, who worked as a dentist for the Leagues, the residents later accused of involvement had no ideological motives and neither adhered to the revolutionary proposal.

Besides the Cuban issue, the financing of the guerrilla came, according to Clodomir, from the bourgeoisie and landowners revolted by "the coup tendencies that had manifested themselves since the death of Getúlio Vargas" and "the intervention of American imperialism in our economy". Among them, he cites D. Maria Prestes Maia, wife of Prestes Maia, mayor of São Paulo, Duque Estrada, of the Socialist Party of São Paulo, and sectors of São Paulo industry.

=== Relationship with Cuba ===
Cuba's support through training of Quadros is known for sure, while funding is more controversial. Still in 1961, under the government of Jânio Quadros, the Cubans showed willingness to train Brazilian guerrillas, and Francisco Julião asked about it while in Cuba. Clodomir and the other military leaders, 12 in all, received training in Cuba between 28 July and 20 August 1961, so that they could transmit this knowledge to other militants in camps in Brazil. However, this course took place under improvised conditions and disappointed Clodomir, as it was purely military and did not teach survival. Some militants made subsequent training visits. The Department of Political and Social Order (DOPS) of Rio de Janeiro knew in May 1962 of the sending of Leagues militants to train in Cuba.

The course was approved at Fidel Castro's insistence, because Che Guevara was against it due to the good relations with the Brazilian government. The Cuban state was divided between those interested in "exporting the revolution" (Note: See also Cuban military internationalism) and those who knew the difficulties of implanting focuses in other countries. Havana had good relations with Jânio and Jango, and thus preferred that the Leagues could approach the Brazilian government. But the "export of the revolution" was a real effort, called for by all Latin American revolutionaries through the Second Declaration of Havana, "an event that sounded like a battle cry" in February 1962. In Brazil, the largest country in Latin America, the Peasant Leagues were the only option to apply this policy, since the other organization willing to start a guerrilla war, the Polop, would only do it in urban areas. Communist Parties aligned to the USSR were not an option.

The Brazilian press reported the discovery of documents connecting Cuba to the guerrillas in the wreckage of the Varig Flight 810, crashed in Lima, Peru. Part of the press doubted the discovery. (Note: Melo (2009, p. 170) The author also ridicules the discovery.) According to Flávio Tavares, linked to Leonel Brizola and the Guerrilla of Caparaó, these documents proved Cuban funding and had been seized by the army. Goulart felt betrayed, as he had been favorable to Cuba at various times, but to avoid a diplomatic incident, he handed the material to the Cubans, and thus it ended up in the wreckage in Lima. Among the documents seized in Dianópolis were criticisms by militants Tarzan de Castro and Carlos Montarroyo of Clodomir's leadership; however, for the criticized, they were denunciations invented by them after his expulsion from the guerrillas. According to Tarzan de Castro, he wrote with Cuban diplomat Miguel Brugueras del Valle a detailed diagnosis of the precarious situation of the guerrillas. The document was taken out of Brazil by Raúl Cepero Bonilla, president of the Central Bank of Cuba, but he died in the plane crash. Both Flávio Tavares and Tarzan de Castro report the seizure of the compromising documents by the CIA.

Tarzan de Castro and Francisco Julião affirm the existence of Cuban financing, the latter clarifying that the money never passed through him. The peasant Gesílio Carvalho mentions the receipt of money in kind by the guerrillas. According to rumors, it came from Cuba through a businessman in Dianópolis; Clodomir de Morais denied the financing in a statement, explaining that the funds came from Brazilians; in another, he said he received financial support not from the government in Havana, but from the National Association of Cuban Farmers (ANAC), as well as from the World Federation of Trade Unions and workers' organizations from socialist countries. This version matches the existence of divergent opinions in Cuba about support for the guerrillas in Brazil. Still, ANAC's funding would be impossible without the blind eye or endorsement of the Cuban state.

== Guerrilla warfare devices ==
=== Geographical distribution ===
Guerrilla devices were deployed at the following locations:

- Gilbués, Piauí, near Bahia (by "Amaro Luís de Carvalho, in Piauí, source of the Gurgueia River")
- Itanhém, south of Bahia ("in Serra dos Aimorés, between Bahia and Minas Gerais, in Água Preta, would be organized by Mariano da Silva")
- Serra da Saudade, between Rondonópolis and Alto Garças, Mato Grosso, ("on the Juribo and Tiquira Rivers and in the Mata Petrovina, organized by Adauto Freire da Cruz"), later transferred to Serra da Jaciara;
- Rio Preto, Rio de Janeiro;
- Dianópolis, Goiás;
- Prudentópolis, western Paraná, later transferred to between Cascavel and Toledo;
- São João dos Patos, Maranhão;
- Border with Bolivia in Acre.

There is also mention of a focus in Santa Fé de Goiás, near the Mato Grosso border, and, according to Clodomir de Morais, in Tocantinópolis and Gurupi, but the guerrilla presence in these two cities is denied by Tarzan de Castro.

The locations were remote and with a history of garimpos and political and land conflicts. According to Leagues militant Alexina Crespo, there were two proposals for geographical distribution, one to divide the country horizontally and the other vertically. The vertical strategy was the one chosen, although Fidel Castro had liked the horizontal one when he presented it.

The first three were created a few days after the fall of Jânio Quadros. Of the eight, some had special functions: the one in Rio Preto could sabotage the infrastructure between Rio de Janeiro, São Paulo and Minas Gerais, while the border station in Acre was used for arms trafficking. There was also a radio station on a barge on the Araguaia River. The structure was compartmentalized and only the military commanders – Adauto Freire da Cruz, Mário Luiz de Carvalho, Ozias Ferreira and Adamastor Bonilha – knew the location of all the camps. Clodomir de Morais participated in the conception of the project as a whole, but was not directly responsible for its implementation. The guerrillas were transferred from one device to another to learn about various terrains.

=== Internal crisis ===
The future guerrillas spent a year in preparation, but had little military training, limiting themselves to reconnoitering the terrain, acquiring political training, and organizing local peasants into associations. The preparations were inefficient: the ambition of the guerrillas ran into obstacles due to their precocity and spontaneity, lack of structure, material means and financing, surveillance by the organs of repression, centralizing direction and negative repercussions of the Cuban Missile Crisis. Journalist Elio Gaspari refers to the devices as "guerrilha mambembe", whose militants in Goiás went hungry. When the guerrillas were discovered, they were already collapsing.

Clodomir de Morais blames the failure on the lack of unity of the movement and on the power held by Francisco Julião, who, although he did not set up the guerrilla scheme, allowed the infiltration of other movements and diverted the resources of the guerrilla to his campaign in the 1962 elections. Julião, in turn, affirmed that the idea of setting up the guerrilla was always wrong. According to Clodomir, the internal disputes subverted the movement and some of the participants themselves denounced it to the authorities. His leadership is criticized in several statements. He is accused of having lied to cover up the precariousness of the guerrilla situation.

=== Dianópolis device ===
Goiás would be relevant for a guerrilla war because of its central position in the country and proximity to Brasília. In the north of Goiás, currently Tocantins, the guerrillas fixed their base in the current municipality of Rio da Conceição, then the town of Dianópolis. It had appropriate terrain for the formation of hiding places and, while it was isolated by land, (Note: Britto (2020, p. 101) "overland transportation was done on precarious roads by truck, on horses through "tracks" in the woods or boarding by river, journeys that could last for months.") it had air transportation to Goiânia and Belém. Clodomir chose this point for its proximity to Bahia. There were gold miners "recognized as fearless men and thus fit for the revolutionary struggle" and many poor peasants. The peasant leader José Porfírio de Souza supported the guerrilla project. Near the site, in the current municipality of Combinado, a settlement of the "Combined Agro-Urbanos" program of Mauro Borges, governor of Goiás, was established in 1962. Inspired by Israeli kibbutz, the program had an appeasing character, of a peaceful counter-revolution, and is characterized as an agrarian reform or counter-reform. (Note: See Britto (2020) and Borba (2018)) It is possible that the settlement was a reaction to the Peasant Leagues, or that it attracted them.

In November 1961, Northeasterners from the military sector of the Leagues, mainly from Pernambuco, arrived in the region, buying three farms, one for planning and two for military training, under the legal facade of an agricultural company. Political proselytizing was then done, leading to the creation of approximately 13 Peasant Leagues in the region, and social services (medicine and a school) and jobs were offered. Under this façade was the training, both military and intellectual and ideological, of the guerrillas. According to Adauto Monteiro da Silva, the little training that occurred was in jungle survival techniques, and the camp served groups of more than ten militants, who would spend a few months there before being exchanged for others. World War II era rifles and pistols were purchased. The army reported finding "four (4) 7 mm rifles, two (2) .22 caliber "Flaubet", eighteen (18) .44 caliber carbines, two (2) .32 caliber revolvers, one (1) .38 caliber revolver, and four hundred (400) rifle bullets". At the time of the discovery the group was waiting for a delivery of armaments by a ferry.

The Dianópolis focus was dismantled by the army's intelligence sectors allied to the Goiás government. In November 1962, the army invaded the device and its members fled. According to Adauto, they were only not captured because they were outside the headquarters when the military invaded. He and many others managed to escape to Barreiras, Bahia. According to Flávio Tavares, the device was discovered when the head of the Smuggling Repression Service, José de Seixas, suspected that refrigerators had been sent to the area with no electricity. Imagining them to be weapons smuggled by the landowners, he found the guerrilla base there. However, the understanding that the discovery was random is contradicted by the accounts of Clodomir and others, according to which the authorities were already monitoring their activities before the operation. (Note: For example, Alexina Crespo relates that "There, in Goiás, it was a real betrayal. A police officer denounced us. We had a way to approach the devices. We approached them singing or whistling the Cuban anthem because nobody knew it. It was the password. This person went there and denounced everything". Cabral, Medeiros & Araújo (2011, p. 1213)) According to Tarzan de Castro, local farmers denounced the movement and he warned Clodomir de Morais of the knowledge of the camp by the army, Goiás police and the Federal Police, but Clodomir ignored the alert and reinforced Dianópolis. The peasant Hastrogildo R. de França mentions possible local denunciants.

== Results ==
The MRT suffered great repression. Twenty four people, including Clodomir de Morais and Tarzan de Castro, had their preventive detention requested. Denounced from within the organization, Clodomir was arrested on Brasil Avenue while transporting weapons in his Rural Willys. He declared to the judge that he had suffered torture at the police station to confess that the weapons were Czech-made. The trial sentenced him to one year in prison. According to Tarzan de Castro, the militants arrested in Goiás were tortured by the Goiás DOPS to confess that Mauro Borges was responsible for the guerrilla war. The Peasant Leagues, by political necessity, denied any relation with the guerrilla war and condemned the army and the police for their actions in Dianópolis and in the arrest of Clodomir. The inquiry into this arrest provocatively accused a connection with Julião, the USSR embassy, the PCB and Luís Carlos Prestes, which was not plausible considering the divisions within the left.

But the repercussion of the discovery, with the repression and persecution of the movement, damaged the Leagues. Apart from the impact of the guerrilla war, their radical agrarian reform project was rejected by the right as well as by the PCB and President Goulart, and they were intent on demobilizing it. Besides considering the Leagues illegitimate, since they existed outside the union system, the government feared a costly counterinsurgency campaign – San Tiago Dantas, Minister of Foreign Affairs, mentioned the topic in a Council of Ministers meeting in April 1962 – and supported rural unionization. The unions, focused on the wage question and not on agrarian reform, were also supported by the Catholic Church and the Communist Party and quickly weakened the Peasant Leagues. By 1963 they were in decline.

The guerrilla device in Dianópolis, with its small number of people involved, had repercussions disproportionate to the threat it actually represented, being seen as an indication of the imminence of a socialist revolution. The Cuban involvement aggravated the polemic: The O Estado de S. Paulo reported what happened in Dianópolis in December; the whole press covered the subject. For O Cruzeiro, "Sierra Maestra is moving to the Brazilian sertão". The plane crash in Peru also had repercussions. The Correio da Manhã compared it to the Cohen Plan. The Diário Carioca denounced that the accusations would be part of a plan of psychological terrorism, with the participation of the governor of Guanabara Carlos Lacerda, to destabilize the imminent holding of the referendum on parliamentarism. In the Diário do Oeste, journalist Edison Hermano stated of the Dianópolis case, "if it happened it was enormously misrepresented."

For the U.S. government, Cuban involvement reinforced the alarmist interpretation of the Peasant Leagues as a possible armed threat and contributed to the deterioration of diplomatic relations and the decision to destabilize the Goulart government.

== Legacy ==
The movement was a precursor of left-wing armed struggle in Brazil and one of the first attempts to start a rural guerrilla, an ambition that would only be effectively implemented with the Araguaia Guerrilla and was already dreamed of by its future realizers, the PCdoB board of directors, in the founding of the party in 1962. (Note: See Corrêa (2013, pp. 406–407)) The Peasant Leagues were also pioneers in sending militants to train in Cuba. The MRT evidences that the armed struggle, considered a response to the 1964 coup d'état and the hardening of the military dictatorship with Institutional Act No. 5, was already considered by a part of the Brazilian left before these events. (Note: Sales (2005, pp. 150–151), Angelo (2011, pp. 190–191), Ferreira (2009, p. 187) and Ronchi (2011, p. 17). The same line of reasoning is mentioned in the discussion of the Sergeants' Revolt of 1963. See Parucker (2006, p. 172)) In this sense, it is comparable to the Tupamaros in Uruguay, who started their activities when the country was still democratic.

Later, an organization of the same name was founded in September 1969 in Campos do Jordão. The group was so named as a way to honor the first MRT.

== See also ==
- Araguaia Guerrilla War
- 1964 Brazilian coup d'état
- Clodomir Santos de Morais
- Cuban Missile Crisis
- Jânio Quadros
- Central Intelligence Agency
- Central Bank of Cuba
- Varig Flight 810
- Peasant leagues (Brazil)
- Bay of Pigs Invasion
- Tiradentes Revolutionary Movement (1969-1971)
