= 1959 in Brazil =

Events in the year 1959 in Brazil.

== Incumbents ==
=== Federal government ===
- President: Juscelino Kubitschek
- Vice President: João Goulart

=== Governors ===
- Alagoas: Sebastião Muniz Falcão
- Amazonas:
  - Plínio Ramos Coelho (till 25 March)
  - Gilberto Mestrinho (from 25 March)
- Bahia: Antônio Balbino then Juracy Magalhães
- Ceará:
  - Flávio Marcílio (until 25 March)
  - Parsifal Barroso (from 25 March)
- Espírito Santo:
  - Francisco Lacerda de Aguiar (until 31 January)
  - Carlos Fernando Monteiro Lindenberg (31 January-10 October)
  - Raul Giuberti (from 10 October)
- Goiás:
  - José Ludovico de Almeida (until 31 January)
  - José Feliciano Ferreira (from 31 January)
- Maranhão: José de Matos Carvalho
- Mato Grosso: João Ponce de Arruda
- Minas Gerais: José Francisco Bias Fortes
- Pará:
  - Magalhães Barata (until 29 May)
  - Luís de Moura Carvalho (from 29 May)
- Paraíba: Pedro Gondim
- Paraná: Moisés Lupion
- Pernambuco:
  - Otávio Correia de Araújo (until 31 January)
  - Constantino Carneiro de Albuquerque Maranhão (31 January-31 March)
  - Cid Sampaio (from 31 March)
- Piauí:
  - Jacob Gaioso e Almendra (until 25 March)
  - Chagas Rodrigues (from 25 March)
- Rio de Janeiro:
  - Togo Barros (until 30 January)
  - Osmar Serpa de Carvalho (30 January-31 January)
  - Roberto Silveira (from 31 January)
- Rio Grande do Norte: Dinarte de Medeiros Mariz
- Rio Grande do Sul:
  - Ildo Meneghetti (until 25 March)
  - Leonel Brizola (from 25 March)
- Santa Catarina: Heriberto Hülse
- São Paulo:
  - Jânio Quadros (until 31 January)
  - Carlos Alberto Alves de Carvalho Pinto (from 31 January)
- Sergipe:
  - Leandro Maciel (until 31 January)
  - Luís Garcia (from 31 January)

=== Vice governors ===
- Alagoas: Sizenando Nabuco de Melo
- Bahia: Orlando Moscoso (from 7 April)
- Ceará: Wilson Gonçalves (from 25 March)
- Espírito Santo:
  - Adwalter Ribeiro Soares (until 31 January)
  - Raul Giuberti (from 31 January)
- Goiás:
  - Bernardo Sayão Carvalho Araújo (until 31 January)
  - João de Abreu (from 31 January)
- Maranhão: Alexandre Alves Costa
- Mato Grosso: Henrique José Vieira Neto
- Minas Gerais: Artur Bernardes Filho
- Paraíba: Pedro Gondim
- Pernambuco: Pelópidas da Silveira (from 15 December)
- Piauí:
  - Francisco Ferreira de Castro (until 25 March)
  - Tibério Nunes (from 25 March)
- Rio de Janeiro:
  - Roberto Silveira (until 25 March)
  - Celso Peçanha (from 25 March)
- Rio Grande do Norte: José Augusto Varela
- Santa Catarina: Vacant
- São Paulo: Porfírio da Paz
- Sergipe:
  - José Machado de Souza (until 31 January)
  - Dionísio Machado (from 31 January)

== Events ==
=== January ===
- 31 January: The Brazilian Men's Basketball Team wins its first World Basketball Championship title by beating the Chilean Men's Basketball Team in Santiago.

=== May ===
- 26 May: The non-profit philanthropic organization, The Charitable Works Foundation of Sister Dulce is established by Sister Dulce.

=== June ===
- 17 June: President Juscelino Kubitschek decides to break away with the IMF, due to pressure on meeting loan requirements.

=== August ===
- 23 August: The first Brazilian Football Championship begins with state champion clubs in the country's cities.

=== December ===
- 2 December: Journalist Antônio Callado from Correio da Manhã publishes a series of reports on the Peasant Leagues of the Northeast.
- 2-4 December: Officials of the Brazilian Air Force and Brazilian Army try to start a military uprising with a seizure of power and carry out the country's first plane hijacking. The revolt would fail and later be known as the Aragarças Revolt.
- 7 December: The Legislative Assembly of Pernambuco approves the expropriation of Engenho Galiléia (a sugar mill), a project by Deputy Francisco Julião; lawyer for the Peasant League.
- 15 December: SUDENE is created by Law nº 3.692, which would seek the development of the Northeast region of Brazil.

== Births ==
=== January ===
- 13 January: Gilmar Rinaldi, retired footballer
- 20 January: Ivo Cassol, politician

=== April ===
- 12 April: Robinson Faria, politician (Governor of Rio Grande do Norte, 2015-2018)
- 18 April: José Eduardo Cardozo, lawyer

=== September ===
- 23 September: Hortência Marcari, basketball player

== Deaths ==
=== February ===
- 20 February: Gregório Bondar, Russian-Brazilian agronomist (b. 1881)

=== August ===
- 16 August: José Pessoa, Brazilian military officer (b. 1885)

=== November ===
- 17 November: Heitor Villa-Lobos, Brazilian composer (b. 1887)

== See also ==
- 1959 in Brazilian football
