= Primavera das Neves =

Portuguese translator (1933–1981)

- Born: Primavera Ácrata Saiz das Neves; 8 March 1933; Pedrógão Grande, Portugal
- Died: 29 January 1981 (aged 47); Rio de Janeiro, Brazil
- Citizenship: Portuguese; Brazilian
- Education: Federal University of Rio de Janeiro
- Occupations: Translator; journalist; writer
- Writing career
- Pen name: Vera Neves Pedroso
- Language: Portuguese

Primavera Ácrata Saiz das Neves (8 March 1933 – 29 January 1981) commonly known as Primavera das Neves, was a Portuguese translator, journalist and writer, who worked and lived most of her life in Brazil, having signed most of her works as Vera Neves Pedroso.

== Biography ==
The daughter of the Portuguese journalist and anarchist activist Roberto das Neves and the Spanish suffragist Maria Jesusa Diaz y Saiz, das Neves came to Brazil with her parents in 1942. She studied at the French Liceu in Rio de Janeiro, and in 1957 graduated from the Federal University of Rio de Janeiro with a degree in Germanic languages. In 1959, she married military officer Manuel Pedroso Marques, moving to Lisbon, where her only daughter Maria Alexandra was born (1961–2005). Shortly after, with her husband's involvement and subsequent arrest in the Beja Revolt against the dictator António de Oliveira Salazar in 1962, das Neves returned to Rio de Janeiro.

In Brazil, she was the translator of Lewis Carroll (Alice in Wonderland and Through the Looking-Glass), Emily Brontë (Wuthering Heights), Adolfo Bioy Casares (The Invention of Morel), Vladimir Nabokov (Transparencies), Georges Simenon (Magret's Vacation), Lawrence Durrell (Tunc, 1969), John Le Carré (Smiley's People, 1980), Jules Verne (Journey to the Center of the Earth, 1963), Arthur C. Clarke (Childhood's End, 1965) and others.

== In popular culture ==
In 2017, das Neves was the subject of the documentary "Quem é Primavera das Neves", directed by Jorge Furtado and Ana Luíza Azevedo and released at the É Tudo Verdade Festival. The film shows director Furtado's search for a translator with a sonorous name, has actress Mariana Lima reading excerpts from das Neves' poems, letters and translations, and reconstructs her life through statements by ex-husband Manuel Pedroso Marques and by two of his friends, artist Anna Bella Geiger and librarian Eulalie Ligneul.
