= Vladimir Carvalho =

Brazilian film director (1935–2024)

- Carvalho in 2019
- Born: Vladimir Carvalho da Silva; January 31, 1935; Itabaiana, Paraíba, Brazil
- Died: October 24, 2024 (aged 89); Brasília, Federal District, Brazil
- Occupations: Filmmaker and documentarian
- Relatives: Walter Carvalho (brother)

Vladimir Carvalho da Silva (31 January 1935 – 24 October 2024) was a Brazilian filmmaker and documentarian, having produced dozens of documentaries that portray Brazil's political and social history. He is widely recognized as one of the greatest documentarians of his country and a central figure in the documentary strand of Cinema Novo, earning the nickname "Vertov of the Caatinga".

== Biography and career ==
Vladimir Carvalho da Silva was born on January 31, 1935, in the city of Itabaiana, in the Agreste region of Paraíba. As a child, Vladimir was taken by his parents to Recife, where he was raised by a maternal aunt in order to receive a better education. When he was nearly 14 years old, his father left the family; at the time Vladimir's brother Walter Carvalho was less than a year old.

During his adolescence, Carvalho returned to Paraíba and settled in João Pessoa. He was a geography student of Linduarte Noronha, who was not yet a filmmaker but who deeply influenced his interest in cinema. In 1959, at only 24 years old, he hosted the radio program Luzes do Cinema and contributed to the local press as a beginner critic, earning the nickname "Vladimir Vorochenko" for his fixation on Soviet films.

In 1959, Linduarte Noronha invited him to write the screenplay for Aruanda (1960), a documentary that would become a milestone of Paraíba cinema and one of the precursors of Cinema Novo. Vladimir also served as assistant director on the work.

After finishing high school, he began a Philosophy course at the Federal University of Paraíba. Seeking the headquarters of the Popular Center for Culture of the National Union of Students, he transferred his enrollment to the Federal University of Bahia, in Salvador. There, he met Glauber Rocha and officially joined the Cinema Novo movement, becoming part of its documentary strand. It was during this period that he received from Glauber the nickname "Vertov of the Caatinga," in reference to the Russian documentarian Dziga Vertov.

In 1962, he co-directed his first film, the short film Os Romeiros da Guia, shot in black and white with a 35 mm camera.

In 1964, Carvalho was invited by Eduardo Coutinho to serve as assistant director on Cabra Marcado para Morrer, a documentary about the Peasant Leagues in Pernambuco. With the 1964 coup d'état, filming was interrupted and Vladimir went into hiding to escape political persecution. During this period, he hid on a farm in Campina Grande under the false identity of "José Pereira dos Santos," becoming known to his neighbors as "Zé dos Santos." To justify his presence, he produced wooden sculptures of saints. Before fleeing, he helped ensure the safety of Elizabeth Teixeira, the central figure of the documentary, who was in danger under the new regime.

In 1967, during the Brasília Film Festival, he reunited with his colleague from Cabra Marcado para Morrer, the photographer Fernando Duarte, who invited him to stay in the capital with the aim of carrying out a project for a documentary production center for the Midwest region through the University of Brasília (UnB). Planned to stay only two months, Carvalho ended up settling in the city, where he was a professor at UnB for 20 years. In 1994, he founded the Cinememória Foundation, an archive dedicated to the history of Brazilian cinema.

Vladimir Carvalho died on October 24, 2024, in Brasília, due to a heart attack and kidney complications.

== Filmography ==
- Romeiros da Guia (1962)
- A Bolandeira (1967)
- Vestibular 70 (1970)
- O País de São Saruê (1971)
- Incelência para um Trem de Ferro (1972)
- O Espírito Criador do Povo Brasileiro (1973)
- O Itinerário de Niemeyer (1973)
- Vila Boa de Goyaz (1974)
- Quilombo (1975)
- Mutirão (1975)
- José Lins do Rego (1975)
- A Pedra da Riqueza (1976)
- Pankararu do Brejo dos Padres (1977)
- Brasília Segundo Feldman (1979)
- O Homem de Areia (1982)
- O Evangelho Segundo Teotônio (1984)
- Perseghini (1984)
- No Galope da Viola (1990)
- A Paisagem Natural (1991)
- Conterrâneos Velhos de Guerra (1991)
- Negros de Cedro (1998)
- Barra 68 (2000)
- O Engenho de Zé Lins (2006)
- Rock Brasília - Era de Ouro (2011)
