= Flight 810 =

Flight 810 may refer to the following aviation accidents:

- Trans-Canada Air Lines Flight 810, crashed on 9 December 1956
- Varig Flight 810, crashed on 27 November 1962
- Transair Flight 810, ditched on 2 July, 2021
