= Ana Azevedo =

Ana Azevedo may refer to:

- Ana Carolina Azevedo, Brazilian sprinter
- Ana Azevedo (futsal player), Portuguese futsal player
- Ana Luíza Azevedo, Brazilian filmmaker
