= Peões =

2004 film by Eduardo Coutinho

- Directed by: Eduardo Coutinho
- Starring: Maria Socorro Morais Alves; José Alves Bezerra; Zacarias Feitosa de Morais
- Production company: VideoFilmes
- Release date: November 24, 2004
- Running time: 85 minutes
- Country: Brazil
- Language: Portuguese

Peões is a 2004 Brazilian documentary film directed by Eduardo Coutinho.

== Synopsis ==
The documentary delves into the search for ABC region metallurgists from São Paulo who participated in the largest strikes of the 20th century. The movement changed the face of Brazilian trade unionism, provided the basis for the creation of the Workers Party (PT) and made emerge the figure of leader Luiz Inácio Lula da Silva.

== Awards ==
2004: Brasília Film Festival

1. Best Film (won)
2. Critics Award (Eduardo Coutinho) (won)

2005: Cinema Brazil Grand Prize

1. Best Documentary (Nominee)
2. Best Director (Eduardo Coutinho) (Nominee)

2005: São Paulo Association of Art Critics Awards

1. Best Film (won)
