= Eurídice Moreira =

Brazilian politician (1939–2020)

Member of the Legislative Assembly of Paraíba
- In office 1995–1998

Mayor of Itabaiana
- In office 2005–2012
- Preceded by: Sebastião Tavares de Oliveira (Babá)
- Succeeded by: Antônio Carlos

Personal details
- Born: March 5, 1939 Maceió, Alagoas, Brazil
- Died: July 1, 2020 (aged 81) João Pessoa, Paraíba, Brazil
- Party: Brazilian Labour Party (PTB)
- Other political affiliations: PFL (former)
- Profession: Politician, Professor

Eurídice Moreira da Silva (5 March 1939 – 1 July 2020), better known as Eurídice Moreira or Dona Dida, was a Brazilian Politician and Professor from the state of Alagoas who represented the state of Paraíba.

== Career ==
In 1994, she successfully campaigned for a spot at the Legislative Assembly of Paraíba; her term lasted from 1995 to 1998.

In 1998, she attempted re-election as a State Deputy, but ultimately failed to secure enough votes for a new term.

In 2002, Moreira tried to reclaim her Legislative Assembly of Paraíba seat lost at the previous elections. Once again she wasn't able to secure enough votes in order to be elected.

In 2004, she was elected Mayor of Itabaiana. Her first tenure went from 2005 to 2008.

In 2008, she was re-elected Mayor of Itabaiana. This time she remained in office between 2009 and 2012.

== Personal life and death ==
Moreira was the widow of Aglair Silva, a politician who also held the position of Mayor of Itabaiana. Her son José Sinval, also a politician, is the incumbent Deputy mayor of Itabaiana.

On 1 July 2020, Moreira died in João Pessoa at the age of 81 from complications brought on by COVID-19 during the COVID-19 pandemic in Brazil.
