= Playing (disambiguation) =

Playing is voluntary, intrinsically motivated recreation.

It may also refer to:

- Playing (album)
- Playing (film)
