= Manduka =

Brazilian musician and artist (1952–2004)

- Born: Alexandre Manuel Thiago de Mello; February 21, 1952; Petrópolis, Rio de Janeiro
- Died: October 17, 2004 (age 52) Rio de Janeiro, Rio de Janeiro
- Genres: rock, soft rock, folk, psychedelic rock, MPB
- Occupations: Composer, singer, guitarist, songwriter, poet, artist

Alexandre Manuel Thiago de Mello, also known as Manduka (Portuguese pronunciation: [mɐˈdukɐ]; February 21, 1952 – October 17, 2004), was a Brazilian composer, musician, poet, and artist. He was an proponent of rock nacional and Nueva Canción Chilena, having a style that ranged from rock to Tropicalismo and was known for his recordings with the Chilean group Los Jaivas.

== Early life ==
Manduka was born in Petrópolis, Rio de Janeiro to journalist Pomona Politis and Amazonian poet Thiago de Mello. He was also the nephew of musician Gaudêncio Thiago de Mello. At age 18, he moved with his family to Santiago, Chile, where he lived for four years, escaping the increasingly authoritarian political climate in Brazil that targeted left-wing intellectuals.

In 1971, he was invited by the film-maker Glauber Rocha to act in and compose for the film A Estrela do Sol. Although uncompleted, it touched on the theme of exile which was a reality for many artists in Brazil at the time, including for both Rocha and Manduka. In Santiago, he met Geraldo Vandré, with whom he composed a series of songs. One of these songs, "Pátria Amada Idolatrada Salve-Salve", performed by Soledad Bravo, won at the 1972 Festival de Aguadulce in Lima, Peru. In 1972 he also released his first LP, Manduka, with RCA Victor.

In 1973 in Chile, he published the book Los Burros Negros. After the 1973 coup of president Salvador Allende, he moved to Argentina, where he composed the music to an adaptation of the Tempest with Augusto Boal. He later moved to Venezuela and visited Europe, living in Germany, France, and Spain. In Europe, he published more books and recorded the LPs Manduka, Manduka e Naná Vasconcelos, Brasil, Caravana, and Los sueños de America.

== Return to Brazil ==
In 1979 Manduka returned to Brazil and released the record Los sueños de America with Chilean band Los Jaivas. The following year, the song "Quem Me Levará Sou Eu", which he composed with Dominguinhos and was performed by Raimundo Fagner, won at the Festival TV Tupi.

From 1978 to 1982, He toured around Brazil as a part of Projeto Pixinguinha. During this time, he began to devote more time to the visual arts. He composed the music to his father's poem Amazônia, Pátria da Água, which was featured in a Globo Repórter series directed by Washington Novaes for Rede Globo. The show was chosen as the best Latin-American cultural program in 1982 in the United States. In this same year, he was chosen to represent Brazil at a musicians' conference taking place in Mexico City, alongside other relevant artists in Latin America at the time like Mercedes Sosa, Omara Portuondo, Silvio Rodríguez, and Pablo Milanés.

He then lived in Mexico for six years where he presented cultural advice to the Brazilian Embassy, published the book La Pequeníssima História de La Musiquíssima Brasileña, and hosted a series of conferences for Mexican universities. While still in Mexico, he exhibited his art Dibujos de Músico. In 1986, at the invitation of Pablo Milanés, Manduka traveled to Cuba, where he recorded the LP Sétima Vida. He returned to Brazil in 1988 where he composed part of the soundtrack to Inconfidência Mineira, which was also for the Globo Repórter.

== Later life ==
Between 1990 and 1997, Manduka developed Conversas Brasileiras, a project aimed to connect musicians, artists, philosophers, sportsplayers, writers, and poets with university students in Brasília and the North and North East regions of Brazil. As part of this project, he published the poetry book De Algo Pro Vinho and released the limited edition CD Terceira Asa with Telebras. At this time, he also recorded a studio album with Dominguinhos which remains unreleased.

In 2002, he wrote three songs for the score to the documentary Rocha Que Voa, directed by Eryk Rocha. He also took part in the making of the soundtracks to documentaries Se É Pra Dizer Adeus, directed by Ana Helena Nogueira, José Lins do Rêgo, directed by Vladimir Carvalho, and Glauber o Filme, Labirinto do Brasil, directed by Sílvio Tendler. He continued to participate in the conferences for Conversas Brasileiras.

== Work as an artist ==
As an artist, Manduka held several exhibitions and illustrated versions of the books O Povo Sabe o que Diz and De uma Vez por Todas by Thiago de Mello, Borges Na Luz by Jorge Luis Borges, and Grafitos nas Nuvens by Cassiano Nunes. From 1997 to 2001, he worked intensively with the plastic arts and was recognized by fellow artists and critics, including Ferreira Gullar. He created studies by combining his traditional artistic style of ink, colored pencils, and pastel with digital technology, aiming at producing a traveling exhibition with large banner pieces.

== Death ==
Manduka died from cardiovascular complications at age 52 on October 17, 2004, in Rio de Janeiro.
