= Twenty Years Later =

- Theatrical release poster
- Directed by: Eduardo Coutinho
- Written by: Eduardo Coutinho
- Produced by: Eduardo Coutinho; Zelito Viana
- Narrated by: Ferreira Gullar; Tite de Lemos
- Cinematography: Edgar Moura; Fernando Duarte
- Edited by: Eduardo Escorel
- Music by: Rogério Rossini
- Production company: Mapa Filmes
- Distributed by: Gaumont
- Release date: December 3, 1984
- Running time: 119 minutes
- Country: Brazil
- Language: Portuguese

Twenty Years Later (Portuguese: Cabra Marcado para Morrer, lit. 'A Man Marked for Death') is a 1984 Brazilian documentary film directed by Eduardo Coutinho.

It originated in 1964 as a planned feature film about the life and death of João Pedro Teixeira, a leader of the Peasant leagues from Paraíba who was assassinated on the order of local landowners in 1962. But before it could be completed, production was interrupted by political developments, with some of the crew and cast arrested and their materials confiscated by the Brazilian military dictatorship. In 1984, Coutinho returned to the material, shooting new footage of some of the actors and crew. The resulting critically acclaimed documentary gained a cult following and in 2015, the Brazilian Film Critics Association selected it as one of the best Brazilian films of all time.

== Overview ==
The original script told the story of João Pedro Teixeira, a peasant leader from Sapé, Paraíba, who was assassinated in 1962 on the order of local landowners.

In 1962, Coutinho, replacing a cameraman of Centro Popular de Cultura (CPC), filmed a protest over the death of Teixeira in Paraíba and met Elizabeth, Teixeira's widow, for the first time. On his return to Rio de Janeiro, he was offered the chance of directing a film for CPC. Initially he wanted to adapt João Cabral de Melo Neto's poems "Cão sem plumas", "O rio" and "Vida e morte Severina" but the poet refused, so he decided to film the life of Texeira instead. In 1963, he went to Paraíba and Pernambuco and within three days he wrote a screenplay based on Mrs. Teixeira's accounts.

Coutinho began shooting the film in 1964 and, in order to be more authentic, cast Mrs. Teixeira as herself and other farmers in the other roles. He wanted to film in Sapé but because of local conflicts he moved the filming location to Vitória de Santo Antão, Pernambuco. After 35 days shooting, and with about 40 percent of the film complete, the Brazilian military dictatorship arrested some members of cast and crew and confiscated the script, stills and other materials. The government also tried to confiscate the footage, but most had already been sent for processing in Rio and survived.

Returning to the region where Twenty Years Later was shot to produce other documentaries in 1979, Coutinho considered completing the film. He eventually concluded he needed to make a different kind of project, telling the story of the earlier filming and revisiting its cast and crew. In 1984, he showed what he had filmed to Mrs. Teixeira and local people and documented their reactions to it and the changing times.

== Reception ==
In 1984, at the 6th Havana Film Festival, Twenty Years Later won the Best Documentary Award. It won the Best Film Award at the 1st Festroia International Film Festival and at the 1985 Cinéma du Réel. Moreover, it became one of the best known films by Coutinho. It gained a cult following in Brazil, and the section In Memoriam of the 86th Academy Awards used it as a reference of his career. In 2015, it was recognized by the Brazilian Film Critics Association as the fourth best Brazilian film of all time on its Top 100.

By the time it was released in the English-speaking world it was also well received by its critics. Variety said "It became a historical document of the revolution from the losers' viewpoint. Cabra suggests the cinema's power to be an agent of its own creative process. It is a highly original documentary." The New York Times described it as "a provocative, one-of-a-kind document" that "is anything but idyllic. However, Mr. Coutinho's commitment to his characters is all the more effective for being cool, controlled and unsentimental." John King, in his book Magical Reels: A History of Cinema in Latin America, called it "The most important Brazilian documentary of the period." Writing for RogerEbert.com, Pablo Villaça praised its "fascinating narrative" and deemed it as "one of the most intriguing documentaries you could ever see."
