= Thiago de Mello =

Brazilian author (1926–2022)

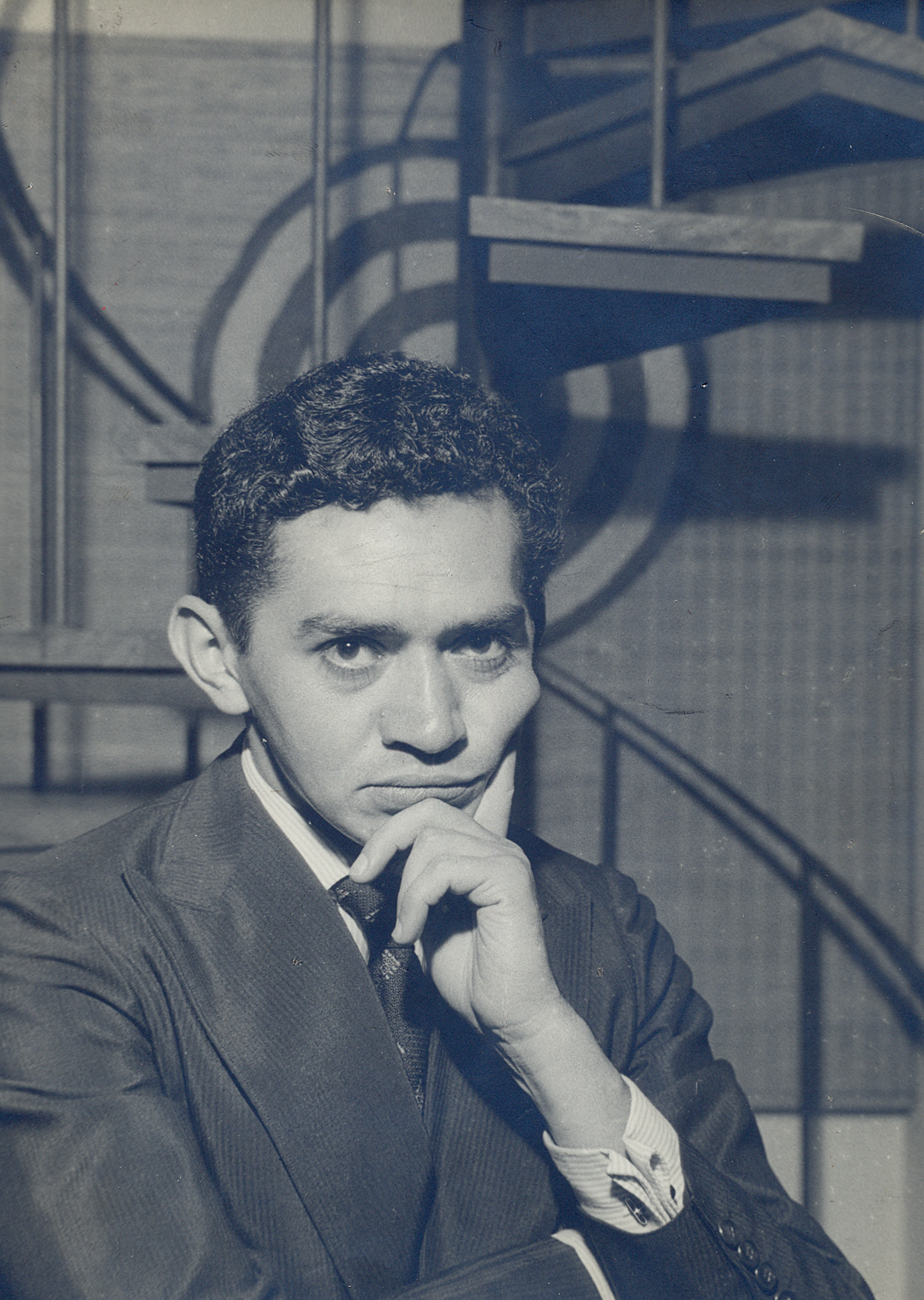
- Born: Amadeu Thiago de Mello; 30 March 1926; Barreirinha, Amazonas, Brazil
- Died: 14 January 2022 (aged 95); Manaus, Brazil
- Occupations: Poet, writer, translator
- Children: Manduka

Amadeu Thiago de Mello (30 March 1926 – 14 January 2022), published as Thiago de Mello, was a Brazilian poet, writer, translator, and environmental activist. He was among the most appreciated writers in the country and especially as an icon of Amazonian regional literature. His work has been translated into numerous languages.

== Life and career ==
After Thiago de Mello completed his elementary education at the Grupo Escolar Barão do Rio Branco and high school at the Gymnásio Pedro II in Manaus, he moved to Rio de Janeiro, where he enrolled in the Faculty of Medicine (Faculdade Nacional de Medicina), but left after four years to pursue the path of poetry. In 1951, Silêncio e Palavra, his first book, was published and immediately received critical acclaim.

During the military dictatorship from 1964 to 1985, he first took exile in Chile, where he found a friend and political sympathizer in Pablo Neruda and witnessed the violent overthrow of President Salvador Allende and the subsequent military coup.

In 1964, he wrote what is probably his best-known poem, Os Estatutos do Homem ( "The Statutes of Man"), which proclaimed simple human rights as a protest against the military regime and was allegedly immediately banned by it. His further exile took him to Argentina, Portugal, France, and Germany. After the end of the Brazilian military dictatorship, he moved back to his native city of Barreirinha, where he lived in a house owned by the architect Lúcio Costa and worked for the integrity of the Amazon region and for human rights.

During literary career, De Mello was awarded national and international prizes and awards.

Besides his own work, he had a long career as a translator of Latin American poetry by Pablo Neruda, César Vallejo, Ernesto Cardenal, Eliseo Diego, Nicolás Guillén, and also T. S. Eliot into Portuguese. His own works have appeared in Chile, Cuba, Argentina, Portugal, the United States, France, Great Britain and Germany, in addition to Brazil. Pablo Neruda said about him, "Thiago de Mello is a soul transformer," and dedicated the poem Thiago y Santiago to him.

De Mello died in Manaus on 14 January 2022, at the age of 95.

== Awards ==
- 1960: Brazilian Academy of Letters' Poetry award
- 1962: Book of the Year Award by União Brasileira de Escritores
- 1997: Rio de Janeiro Book Biennial (Bienal do Livro do Rio de Janeiro) Award
- 1997: Prêmio Jabuti for De uma vez por todas

In addition, Thiago de Mello was named Chevalier des Arts et des Lettres de France in the 1980s.

== Works ==
- 1951: Silêncio e palavra
- 1952: Narciso cego
- 1956: A lenda da rosa
- 1960: Vento geral
- 1965: Faz escuro mas eu canto
- 1966: A canção do amor armado
- 1977: Os Estatutos do Homem
- 1981: Mormaço na floresta
- 1982: Horóscopo para os que estão vivos
- 1986: Num campo de margaridas
- 1991: Amazonas, pátria da àgua Photographies by Luiz Cláudio Marigo
- 1992: Os Estatutos do Homem e Poemas inéditos
- 1993: Borges na luz de Borges
- 1996: De uma vez por todas
- 1999: Campo de milagres
