= Master: A Building in Copacabana =

2002 film by Eduardo Coutinho

- Directed by: Eduardo Coutinho
- Written by: Eduardo Coutinho
- Produced by: João Moreira Salles; Mauricio Andrade Ramos
- Cinematography: Jacques Heuiche
- Edited by: Jordana Berg
- Release date: 2002
- Running time: 110 minutes
- Country: Brazil
- Language: Portuguese

Master: A Building in Copacabana (Portuguese: Edifício Master) is a 2002 Brazilian documentary film by Eduardo Coutinho, about residents of a building in the Copacabana, Rio de Janeiro.

In the 2010s it was ranked as number 28 on the Abraccine Top 100 Brazilian films list and also number 4 in the documentary list.

== Plot ==
The film presents the daily lives of the residents of Edifício Master, in Copacabana, and shows a rich panel of stories. With 276 apartments and 12 floors, the place serves as a home for the interviewees, who reveal dramas, solitude, desires and vanities.

== Promotion ==
The film had its premiere at the Festival de Gramado in August 2002 and won the Best Documentary Award.

The film made subsequent appearances at the Rio de Janeiro International Film Festival, the São Paulo International Film Festival, the Havana Film Festival, the Amsterdam International Documentary Film Festival, among others.

== Accolades ==
List of awards and nominations
Award	Date of ceremony	Category	Recipient(s) and nominee(s)	Result	Ref.
Festival de Gramado	2002	Best Documentary (Critics Award)	Edifício Master	Won	
São Paulo International Film Festival	2002	Best Documentary	Edifício Master	Won	
Havana Film Festival	2003	Best Documentary	Master: A Building in Copacabana	Won	
