= Roque Cordero =

Panamanian composer

- Born: August 16, 1917; Panama City, Panama
- Died: December 27, 2008 (aged 91); Dayton, Ohio, United States
- Occupation(s): Composer, conductor, professor

Roque Cordero (August 16, 1917 – December 27, 2008) was a Panamanian composer.

== Life ==
Born in Panama City, he studied composition under Ernst Krenek and conducting under Dimitri Mitropoulos, Stanley Chapple, and Léon Barzin before becoming director of the Institute of Music and Artistic Director and conductor of the National Symphony of his native country. Later he was assistant director of the Latin American Music Center (LAMúsiCa), professor of composition at Indiana University School of Music, and, from 1972, distinguished professor emeritus at Illinois State University. His students included Panamanian composer Marina Saiz-Salazar.

His works have been widely performed in Latin America, the United States and Europe, receiving international awards for his First Symphony (Honorable Mention, Detroit, 1947), Rapsodia Campesina (First Prize, Panama, 1953), Second Symphony (Caro de Boesi Award, Caracas, Venezuela, 1957), Violin Concerto (1974 Koussevitzky International Recording Award), and Third String Quartet (Chamber Music Award, San José, Costa Rica, 1977). Several of his compositions have been recorded by the Detroit Symphony Orchestra, the Louisville Orchestra, the Chicago Sinfonietta (Eight Miniatures for Small Orchestra, Paul Freeman, conductor, Cedille Records) and various chamber music groups and soloists. He has appeared as guest conductor in Argentina, Brazil, Chile, Colombia, El Salvador, Guatemala, Panama, and in the United States. His "Sonata breve" for solo piano, composed in 1966, is published by C.F. Peters. His Second Symphony was performed by the Seattle Philharmonic in April 2008.

In 2020, his complete works for solo piano were published by Albany Records. They were recorded by Dr. Tuyen Tonnu, Associate Professor of Piano, at Illinois State University.

After retiring he spent the last eight years of his life living with his family in Dayton, Ohio, where he died at age 91.

== Selected works ==
=== Orchestral ===
- Adagio Tragico, String Orchestra
- Capricho Interiorano: Panamanian Folk Ballet Suite
- Eight Miniatures for Small Orchestra
- Concerto for Violin and Orchestra
- Second Symphony in One Movement

=== Chamber music ===
- Dodecaconcerto
- Dos Piezas Cortas
- Mensaje Funebre
- Paz, Paix, Peace, Harp and Ensemble
- Permutaciones 7
- Quinteto
- Soliloquios No. 1
- Soliloquios No. 2
- Soliloquios No. 3
- Sonata
- Sonatina
- String Quartet No. 1
- String Quartet No. 2
- Tres Mensajes Breves, Viola and Piano
- Variations and Theme for Five, Woodwind Quintet

=== Piano ===
- Cinco Miniaturas para Piano
- Duo 1954, Two Pianos
- Five New Preludes for Piano
- Miniatura para Piano
- Nueve Preludios
- Nostalgia
- Preludio para la Cuna Vacía
- Tres Meditaciones Poéticas
- Tres Piececillas para Alina
- Sonata Breve
- Sonata for Piano
- Sonatina Ritmica
- Variaciones para la Segunda Miniatura

=== Choral ===
- Cantata para la Paz
- Dos Pequeñas Piezas Corales

=== Vocal ===
- Musica Veinte, Vocal Soloists and Ensemble
