= Saiz =

Saiz is a Spanish family name. The Real Academia Española establishes that the name be written without an acute accent.

- Federico Saiz (1912–1989), Spanish and Basque footballer
- José Ángel Saiz Meneses (born 1956), Spanish archbishop of the Catholic Church
- Manolo Saiz (born 1959), the team manager of Spanish professional road bicycle racing teams
- Marina Saiz-Salazar (1930-1990), Panamanian composer
- Miguel Saiz (1949–2019), Argentine politician, governor of Río Negro Province
- Odorico Leovigildo Saiz Pérez O.F.M. (1912–2012), Peruvian Bishop of the Catholic Church
- Samuel Saiz (born 1991), Spanish footballer
- Sebas Saiz (born 1994), Spanish basketball player
