= Varig Flight 810 =

1962 aviation accident

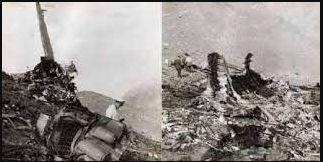
- The aftermath of the crash

Accident
- Date: 27 November 1962
- Summary: Controlled flight into terrain for undetermined reasons
- Site: 25 kilometers Southeast of Lima Airport; 12°7′20.3844″S 76°56′24.5862″W

Aircraft
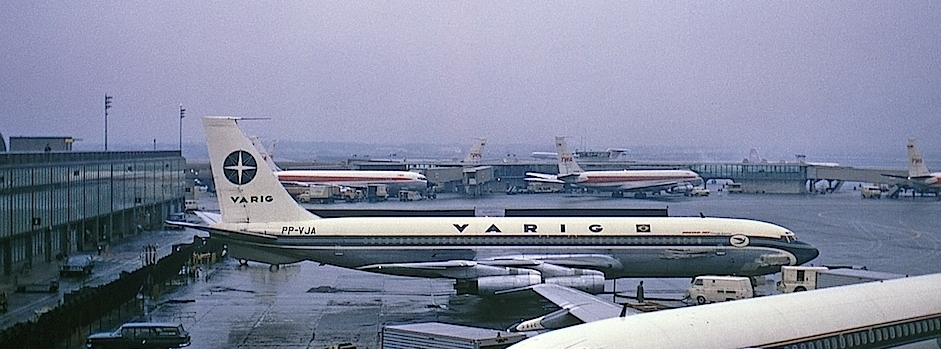
- A Varig Boeing 707 similar to the one involved
- Aircraft type: Boeing 707-441
- Operator: Varig
- Registration: PP-VJB
- Flight origin: Galeão International Airport, Rio de Janeiro
- 1st stopover: Jorge Chávez International Airport, Lima
- 2nd stopover: El Dorado International Airport, Bogotá
- 3rd stopover: Tocumen International Airport, Panama City
- Last stopover: Mexico City International Airport, Mexico City
- Destination: Los Angeles International Airport, Los Angeles
- Occupants: 97
- Passengers: 80
- Crew: 17
- Fatalities: 97
- Survivors: 0

Varig Flight 810 was a scheduled international passenger flight from Rio de Janeiro to Los Angeles with stopovers in Lima, Bogotá, Panama City, and Mexico City. On 27 November 1962, the Boeing 707 operating the route crashed into a mountain on an approach to Lima, killing all 97 passengers and crew. At the time it was the deadliest aviation accident in Peru until being surpassed by LANSA Flight 502 in 1971 and later Faucett Perú Flight 251 in 1996.

== Background ==
=== Aircraft ===
The aircraft involved was a Boeing 707-441 powered by four Rolls-Royce Conway 508 engines, registered PP-VJB to Varig. At the time of the accident, the aircraft was two years old and had accumulated 6,326 flight hours; its certificate of airworthiness (CofA) was issued on 12 September 1962 and was due to expire on 22 May 1963.

=== Crew ===
Due to having two sets of crew on board, 17 crew-members were aboard the flight, of whom eight were cockpit crew. The cockpit crews consisted of:

- Captains Gilberto Salomoni and Edu Michel
- Co-pilots Frederico Helmut Hirschmann and Gaspar Balthazar Ferrario
- Flight engineers Leonardo Nunhofer and Armindo Ferreira Maciel
- Radio operators Besmar Lino dos Reis and Francisco Evangelista Oliveira

All crew-members were citizens of Brazil except for two stewardesses.

== Synopsis ==
At 03:43 UTC the flight departed from Rio en route to Lima carrying 80 passengers and 17 crew-members. The flight passed Pirassununga at 04:30, Campo Grande at 05:24, Corumbá at 05:48, Santa Cruz at 06:30, Cochabamba at 06:52, Charaña at 07:15, and Pisco at 08:13. The crew established contact with Lima air traffic control at 08:09 while at an altitude of 36,000 feet (11,000 m) and gave an estimate of overflying Pisco at 08:13 before reaching Lima airport at 08:36. When they requested descent clearance, air traffic control warned the Boeing 707 of the presence of a Douglas DC-6 that would also reach Pisco at 08:13, but the DC-6 was at an altitude of 13,500 feet (4,100 m). At 08:14, one minute after passing Pisco, the Boeing 707 started its descent, reporting at 08:19 that it was at 26,000 feet.

Shortly thereafter the flight was cleared for a straight-in approach to runway 33. At 08:24 the flight reported to ATC it was at an altitude of 15,000 feet (4,600 m) whilst still in its descent; at 08:30 it had reached an altitude of 12,000 feet (3,700 m) and was directly overhead Las Palmas. Because the flight was still too high for a straight-in approach to runway 33, ATC suggested that the aircraft make a 360° orbit over Las Palmas to lose enough altitude for an approach and report again when the turn was completed. The flight continued descending, then turned slightly right from its 330° heading, passing east of the airport before making a left turn and overflying the airport.

The flight continued the turn until it was heading south, passing the west of Las Palmas to initiate the ILS procedure, then finally made a 180° turn to reach the ILS back course, at a heading of 327°. The flight stayed on the standard intercept course for nearly three minutes until before initiating the turn North. The heading of the flight was 333° when it crashed into the Laz Cruz Peak, eight miles east of the approach track for the published ILS procedure. Communications with ATC ceased at 08:37, and an emergency was declared at 08:55.

The wreckage of the Boeing 707 was found at 18:00 by the Peruvian Air Force. The impact of the crash and explosion from the crash completely destroyed the aircraft, killing all 80 passengers and 17 crew members. Visibility at the time of the accident was reported to be 14 kilometres (8.7 mi).

== Conclusions ==
The aircraft was determined to be flying normally when it crashed; at the time of impact the engines were operating at approach power. The cause of the accident could not be proven conclusively, but several theories have been suggested. The flight time for the 113-mile distance between Pisco and Lima was listed as 23 minutes on the flight plan, when in reality the average flying time reported by other airlines was closer to 16 minutes. The overestimate of time by seven minutes resulted in the aircraft's excessive altitude when arriving at Lima. Analysis of data suggested it was possible that the pilot incorrectly tuned to the Limatambo non-directional beacon in the belief it was the 335-KHz Lima NDB. There was also a possibility that the navigation equipment was giving the flight crew inaccurate information, or a malfunction of the automatic direction finder causing the flight crew to believe the ILS was not functioning.

The probable cause of the accident was cited as follows:

"A deviation, for reasons unknown, from the track prescribed for the instrument approach along the ILS back course of Lima-Callao Airport."

== See also ==
- Avianca Flight 410
- Air Inter Flight 148
- Pakistan International Airlines Flight 268
- American Airlines Flight 965
- Tiradentes Revolutionary Movement (1961-1962)
