= Marina Saiz-Salazar =

Marina Saiz-Salazar (1930-1990) was a composer and music educator who was one of the best known female composers in Panama. She lived in the United States for several years and died in Florida.

Saiz-Salazar was born in Panama to Inez Salazar and Julio Saiz. She studied with Roque Cordero and graduated from the Conservatorio Nacional de Musica (National Institute of Music) with honors in 1957, then taught counterpoint, orchestration, solfeggio, and theory there.

Saiz-Salazar’s compositions incorporated Panamanian folk melodies and rhythms as well as twelve-tone techniques. In May 1965, the Buffalo Philharmonic Orchestra conducted by Richard Dufallo premiered her orchestral work Se Jatpar at the third Inter-American Music Festival in Washington, D.C..

Saiz-Salazar’s compositions were initially published by the Pan American Union. They include:

== Selected works ==
=== Chamber ===
- Fugue (wind quartet)
- Quintet (soprano, clarinet, violin, viola and cello)
- Seven Pieces for Violin and Piano

=== Orchestra ===
- Se Jatpar

=== Piano ===
- Preludes
- Sonata
