= Rio da Conceição =

Municipality in Tocantins, Brazil

Coordinates: 11°28′S 46°47′W

- Municipality
- Interactive map of Rio da Conceição
- Country: Brazil
- Region: Northern
- State: Tocantins
- Mesoregion: Oriental do Tocantins

Population (2020)
  - Total: 2,171
- Time zone: UTC−3 (BRT)

Rio da Conceição is a municipality in the state of Tocantins in the Northern region of Brazil.

The municipality contains part of the 707,079 hectares (1,747,230 acres) Serra Geral do Tocantins Ecological Station, a strictly protected conservation unit created in 2001 to preserve an area of cerrado.

== See also ==
- List of municipalities in Tocantins
