= Antes Que o Mundo Acabe =

2009 film directed by Ana Luíza Azevedo

- Directed by: Ana Luiza Azevedo
- Written by: Giba Assis Brasil; Ana Luiza Azevedo; Jorge Furtado; Paulo Halm
- Produced by: Nora Goulart; Luciana Tomasi
- Starring: Eduardo Cardoso; Murilo Grossi; Caroline Guedes; Bianca Menti
- Cinematography: Jacob Solitrenick
- Edited by: Giba Assis Brasil
- Release date: 15 July 2009 (Festival Paulínia de Cinema)
- Country: Brazil
- Language: Portuguese

Antes Que O Mundo Acabe (English: Before the World Ends) is a 2009 Brazilian film by director Ana Luiza Azevedo. It premiered at the Take 3 Dawn Breakers International Film Festival in Zurich, and was released worldwide in 2010.
