= Serras da Desordem =

2006 film directed by Andrea Tonacci

Serras da desordem
- Directed by: Andrea Tonacci
- Written by: Andrea Tonacci; Sydney Possuelo; Wellington Figueiredo
- Cinematography: Alziro Barbosa; Fernando Coster; Aloysio Raulino
- Edited by: Cristina Amaral
- Release date: 6 November 2006 (UK)
- Running time: 135 minutes
- Country: Brazil
- Language: Portuguese

Serras da Desordem is a 2006 Brazilian film directed by Andrea Tonacci. The film reproduces the trajectory of Carapirú, an Awá-Guajá Indian, who sees his tribe invaded and massacred by farmers and loggers. Serras da Desordem won the best film, direction and cinematography awards at the Gramado Film Festival.
