= Dianópolis =

Municipality in Tocantins, Brazil

- Municipality
- Município de Dianópolis; Municipality of Dianópolis
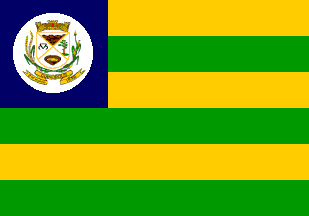
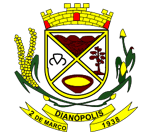
- Flag Coat of arms
- Nickname: DNO
- Localization of Dianópolis in Tocantins

- Localization of Dianópolis in Brazil
- Coordinates: 11°37′33″S 46°49′13″W
- Country: Brazil
- Region: North Region
- State: Tocantins
- Founded: August 26, 1884

Government
  - Mayor: Reginaldo Rodrigues de Melo (PSC)(2013–2016)

Area
  - Total: 3.217179 km^{2} (1.242160 sq mi)
- Elevation: 720 m (2,360 ft)

Population (2020)
  - Total: 22,424
  - Density: 5.94/km^{2} (15.4/sq mi)
- Demonym: Dianopolino or Dianopolitano
- Time zone: UTC−3 (BRT)
- Postal Code (CEP): 77300-000
- Area code: +55 63
- Website: www.dianopolis.to.gov.br

Dianópolis is a municipality in the state of Tocantins in Brazil.

== See also ==
- List of municipalities in Tocantins
