= Playing (film) =

- Film poster
- Directed by: Eduardo Coutinho
- Produced by: Guilherme Cezar Coelho; João Moreira Salles; Mauricio Andrade Ramos
- Cinematography: Jacques Cheuiche
- Edited by: Jordana Berg
- Release date: November 9, 2007 (Brazilian Film Festival)
- Running time: 105 minutes
- Country: Brazil
- Language: Portuguese

Playing (Portuguese: Jogo de Cena) is a 2007 Brazilian documentary film by Eduardo Coutinho, about the friction between truth and fiction in the cinema.

In the 2010s it was ranked as number 17 on the Abraccine Top 100 Brazilian films list and also number 2 in the documentary list.

== Plot ==
In response to a newspaper ad, 83 women responded and told their life story in a studio. Twenty-three of them were selected and filmed in June 2006. In September of the same year, several actresses interpreted, in their own way, the same stories.

== Cast ==
- Andréa Beltrão as herself
- Fernanda Torres as herself
- Marilia Pera as herself
- Aleta Gomes Vieira as herself
- Claudiléa Cerqueira de Lemos as herself
- Débora Almeida as herself
- Gisele Alves Moura as herself
- Jeckie Brown as herself
- Lana Guelero as herself
- Maria de Fátima Barbosa as herself
- Marina D'Elia as herself
- Mary Sheila as herself
- Sarita Houli Brumer as herself

== Promotion ==
Playing was included in the Official Selection at the International Film Festival in Punta del Este, and received its first international public screening there in February 2008.

In April 2008 the film was also screened at the Buenos Aires International Festival of Independent Cinema and at the Tribeca Film Festival.

The film made subsequent appearances at the Locarno Film Festival (on August 7, 2008) and the Los Angeles Film Festival (on November 19, 2014).

In Brazil, the film had its premiere at the São Paulo International Film Festival in October, 2007 and had its theatrical release on November 9, 2007.

== Accolades ==
List of awards and nominations
Award	Date of ceremony	Category	Recipient(s) and nominee(s)	Result	Ref.
International Film Festival in Punta del Este	2008	Best Documentary	Playing	Won	
Cines del Sur	2008	Best Documentary	Playing	Won	
