= São Paulo Art Critics Association =

Arts award organization based in São Paulo, Brazil

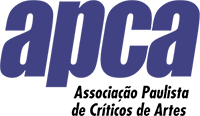
APCA logo.

The São Paulo Art Critics Association or APCA (Associação Paulista dos Críticos de Arte) is an organization established in 1956 in São Paulo that honors the best in the Brazilian fields of stage acting (since 1956), music, literature, film, television, plastic arts (since 1972/1973), and radio (since 1980).

== History ==
In 1951, eight theater critics created the Associação Paulista de Críticos Teatrais (APCT), which would become the São Paulo section of the Associação Brasileira de Críticos Teatrais (ABCT). In 1956, the APCT disassociated itself from the ABCT, becoming an autonomous entity and creating an award destined to the theater. In 1959, the APCT also began to count with the classical music critics, who, in the same year, also had an award organized by the institution.

In 1972, a restructuring of the APCT led to the inclusion of critics from other artistic areas: visual arts, cinema, literature, popular music, and television. With this increase in its scope, the institution gained the name Associação Paulista de Críticos de Arte (APCA) and also expanded its awards, which became known the following year as Prêmio APCA and encompassed all areas with professional critics associated with the entity. Other areas followed: Dance and circus (the latter, no longer part of APCA) in 1973; children's theater in 1979 (although children's plays had already been awarded several times in the main theater award); radio in 1980; architecture in 2010; and fashion in 2015.

Currently, APCA is located at the headquarters of the Union of Professional Journalists of the State of São Paulo, where it holds meetings with its members.

== See also ==
- APCA Award for Best Film
- APCA Television Award
