= Francisco Julião =

Brazilian lawyer, politician and writer

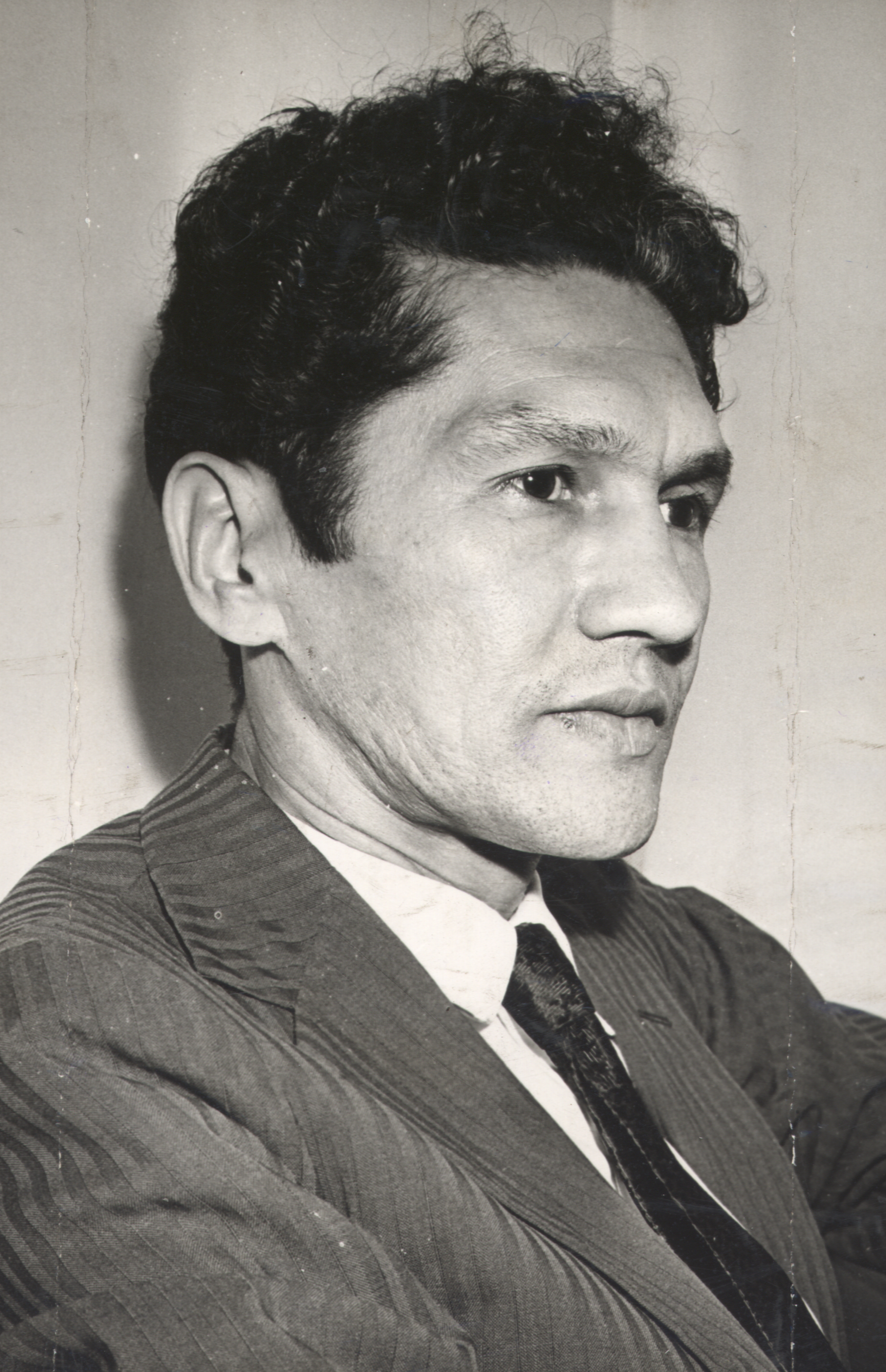

Member of the Chamber of Deputies
- In office 1 February 1963 – 9 April 1964
- Constituency: Pernambuco

State Deputy of Pernambuco
- In office 1 February 1955 – 1 February 1963
- Constituency: At-large

Personal details
- Born: Francisco Julião Arruda de Paula; 15 February 1915 Bom Jardim, Pernambuco, Brazil
- Died: 10 July 1999 (aged 84) Cuernavaca, Morelos, Mexico
- Party: PR (1945–1947); PSB (1947–1965); PDT (1980–1999)
- Education: Faculty of Law of Recife

Francisco Julião Arruda de Paula (16 February 1915 – 10 July 1999) was a Brazilian lawyer, politician and writer. He was born in Recife to a family of landowners. After studying law at university, he dedicated himself to defending peasants who had been expelled from their lands. He helped to found the farmers' cooperative Peasant leagues (Ligas camponesas) in 1956, which worked on multiple fronts to advance peasants' rights in Pernambuco. Juliao gained renown as one of the most committed defenders of agrarian reform in mid-century Brazil.

He was state deputy for the Brazilian Socialist Party between 1952 and 1964, and visited the USSR and Cuba, the latter with President Jânio Quadros. Elected federal deputy in 1962, he was arrested after the 1964 coup, but was released the following year. He then went into exile in Mexico, where he remained for many years. He returned to Brazil after amnesty was granted in 1979. He died in Cuernavaca in 1999.

As an author, he published essays, short stories and novels. Among his best-known books are Cachaça (1951), Irmão Juazeiro (1961), O Que São Ligas Camponesas (1962) and Cambão: La Cara Oculta de Brasil (1968). Cambao was published in English translation as part of the Pelican Latin American Library series.
