= Itabaiana, Paraíba =

Coordinates: 7.32889°S 35.3328°W

- Municipality
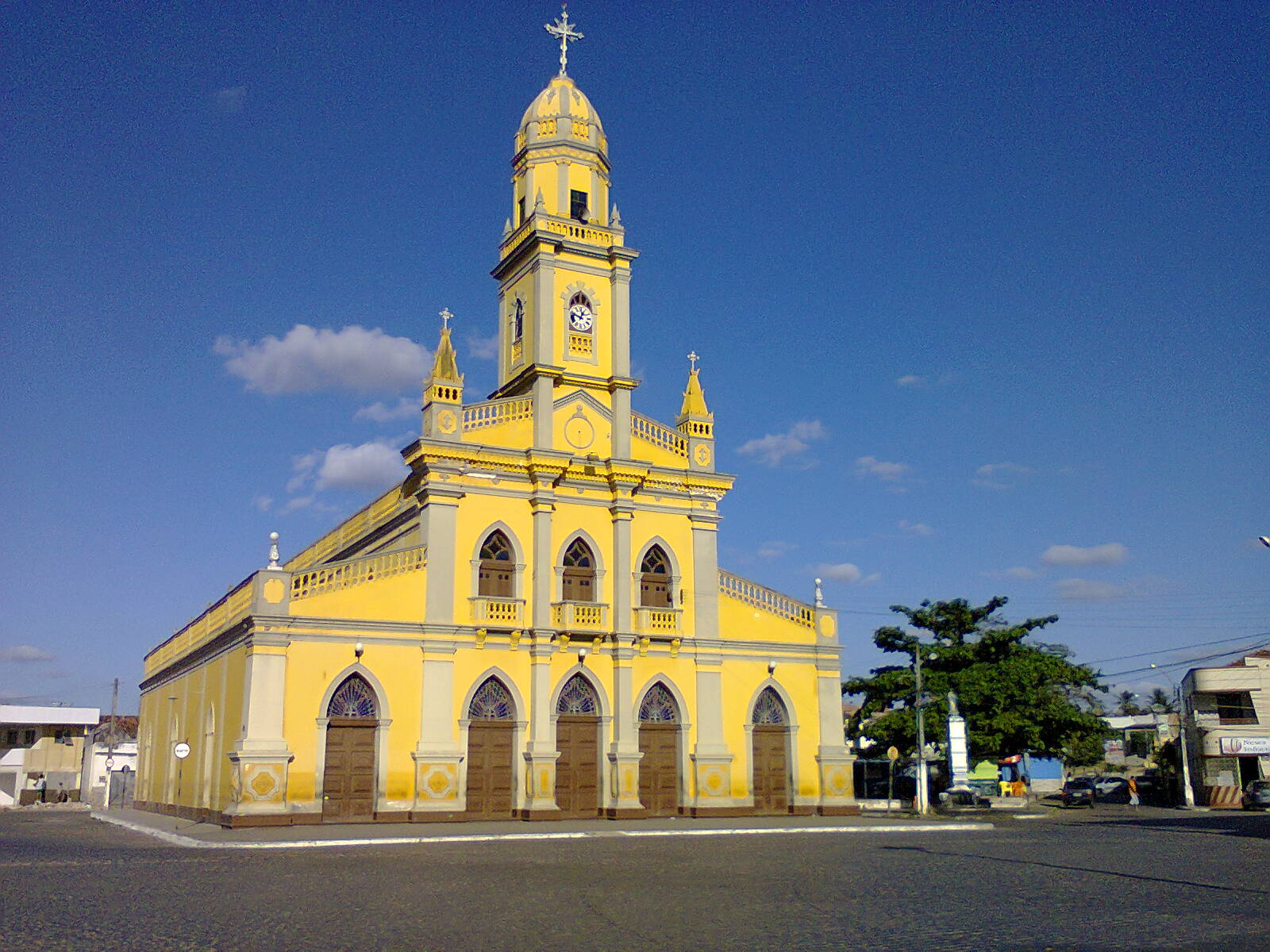
- Catholic Church in downtown Itabaiana.

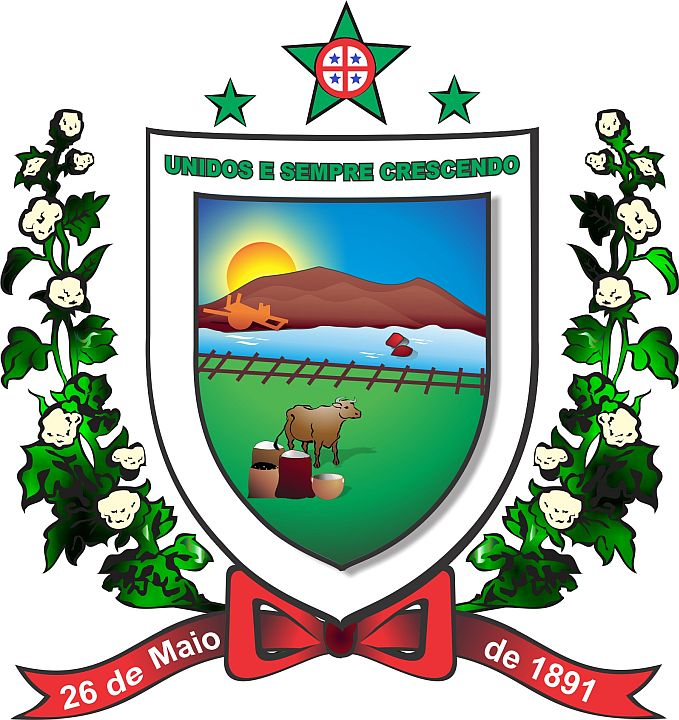
- Flag Coat of arms
- Interactive map of Itabaiana, Paraíba
- Country: Brazil
- Region: Northeast
- State: Paraíba
- Mesoregion: Agreste Paraibano

Government
  - Mayor: Antonio Carlos Rodrigues de Melo Junior (PMDB)

Population (2020)
  - Total: 24,419
- Time zone: UTC−3 (BRT)

Itabaiana (Central northeastern portuguese pronunciation: [itɐbɐjˈɐ̃nɐ]) is a municipality in the state of Paraíba in the Northeast Region of Brazil.

== See also ==
- List of municipalities in Paraíba
