= Eduardo Coutinho =

Brazilian film director, screen writer, actor and film producer

- Coutinho in 2012
- Born: Eduardo de Oliveira Coutinho; May 11, 1933; São Paulo, Brazil
- Died: February 2, 2014 (aged 80); Rio de Janeiro, Brazil
- Occupations: Director; Screenwriter; Actor; Producer; Film editor
- Years active: 1967–2014

Eduardo de Oliveira Coutinho (May 11, 1933 – February 2, 2014) was a Brazilian documentary filmmaker, director, screenwriter, film producer and former reporter, known as one of the most important documentarists in Brazil.

He directed and wrote the script to the 1967 popular Brazilian film ABC do amor near the beginning of his career. The film was entered into the 17th Berlin International Film Festival.

He died on February 2, 2014, in a suspected murder in Rio de Janeiro by his son, who has schizophrenia.

== Biography ==
Born in São Paulo in 1933, Coutinho was a law school graduate. He worked as copy editor at the magazine Visão between 1954 and 1957, and after that he went to France to study film direction at the Institut des Hautes Études Cinématographiques.

Back to Brazil in 1960, Coutinho collaborated with the Centro Popular de Cultura - CPC (Popular Center of Culture), an intellectual group associated to the Brazilian National Student Union, where he produced the 1962 film Cinco Vezes Favela.

Chosen to direct CPC's next production, Coutinho started to work in a fiction based on the death of João Pedro Teixeira, a peasant leader of the Ligas Camponesas in Pernambuco, titled Cabra marcado para morrer. The own rural workers would play themselves in the film, including Elizabeth, Teixeira's widow. The production was interrupted by the 1964 military coup d'état, and part of the production was imprisoned. After the end of dictatorship in Brazil, in 1985, the film was resumed, but as a documentary with shots of the original film and interviews of the surviving production members.

In 1966, Coutinho has constituted a film production company with Leon Hirszman and Marcos Faria. He wrote and directed ABC do Amor in 1967, The Man who Bought the World (1968) and Faustão (1970).

Later he has specialized in screenwriting, being a writer for films such as Dona Flor and Her Two Husbands (1976). Between 1976 and 1984, Coutinho was part of the crew of TV program Globo Repórter.

In 2014, Eduardo Coutinho was stabbed to death by his son, Daniel Coutinho, who was considered 'unaccountable' at trial and was hospitalized for suffering from mental illness.

== Filmography ==
Key
†	Indicates a documentary	‡	Indicates a short film

List of films directed by Eduardo Coutinho
Year	Original title	English release title(s)	Language(s)	Notes
1967	O Pacto ^{‡}		Portuguese	Segment of The ABC of Love (1967). Brazilian-Argentinian co-production.
1968	O Homem Que Comprou o Mundo	The Man Who Bought the World	Portuguese	
1971	Faustão		Portuguese	
1976	Seis Dias de Ouricuri ^{†}		Portuguese	Short documentary on the life conditions of the Ouricuri city in Brazil.
1978	Theodorico: Imperador do Sertão ^{†}	Theodorico: Emperor of the Interior	Portuguese	
1979	Exu: Uma Tragédia Sertaneja ^{†}	Exu: A Tragedy in the Back Country	Portuguese	
1984	Cabra Marcado para Morrer ^{†}	Twenty Years Later	Portuguese	
1987	Santa Marta: Duas Semanas no Morro ^{†}	Santa Marta: Two Weeks in the Slums	Portuguese	Documentary on the daily life in the Santa Marta favela.
1989	Volta Redonda: Memorial da Greve ^{†}		Portuguese	Short documentary.
1991	O Fio da Memória ^{†}		Portuguese	
1993	Boca de Lixo ^{†}	Scavengers	Portuguese	Documentary on the waste pickers' daily life in the Itaoca neighborhood in the São Gonçalo city.
1994	Os Romeiros do Padre Cícero ^{†}		Portuguese	Short documentary.
1995	Seis Histórias ^{†}		Portuguese	Short documentary.
1996	Mulheres no Front ^{†}		Portuguese	Short documentary.
1999	Santo Forte ^{†}	The Mighty Spirit	Portuguese	Short documentary on the March of the One Hundred Thousand.
2000	Babilônia 2000 ^{†}		Portuguese	Documentary on the 1999-2000 New Year's Eve celebrations on the favelas located in the Morro da Babilônia.
2000	Porrada ^{†}		Portuguese	Short documentary.
2002	Edifício Master ^{†}	Master: A Building in Copacabana	Portuguese	Documentary on the residents of the Edifício Master apartment building in Rio de Janeiro.
2004	Peões ^{†}	Metalworkers	Portuguese	Documentary on the workers who took part on the 1978-1980 workers' strike in the ABC Region.
2005	O Fim e o Princípio ^{†}	The End and the Beginning	Portuguese	
2007	Jogo de Cena ^{†}	Playing	Portuguese	
2009	Moscou ^{†}	Moscow	Portuguese	
2010	Um Dia na Vida ^{†}	A Day in the Life	Portuguese	
2011	As Canções ^{†}	Songs	Portuguese	
2014	Sobreviventes de Galileia ^{†}		Portuguese	Half-length documentary.
2014	A Família de Elizabeth Teixeira ^{†}	Elizabeth Teixeira's Family	Portuguese	Sequel to Cabra Marcado para Morrer.
2015	Últimas Conversas ^{†}	Last Conversations	Portuguese	
