= Ana Luíza Azevedo =

Brazilian filmmaker (born 1959)

- Born: Ana Luíza Nunes Azevedo; November 24, 1959 (age 66); Porto Alegre, Rio Grande do Sul, Brazil
- Education: Federal University of Rio Grande do Sul
- Occupations: Film director, screenwriter
- Years active: 1988–present
- Known for: Três Minutos (2000), Antes Que o Mundo Acabe (2009)

Ana Luiza Nunes Azevedo (born 24 November 1959) is a Brazilian filmmaker.

== Biography ==
Azevedo graduated from Federal University of Rio Grande do Sul with a degree in fine arts in 1986; she is a member of Casa de Cinema de Porto Alegre. She was assistant director of several feature films, by directors such as Jorge Furtado, Carlos Gerbase and Carlos Reichenbach.

As a screenwriter and director, she has made short films and television specials, having won awards at various national and international festivals. Her film "Três Minutos" was the only Brazilian representative in the competition of short films at the 2000 Cannes Film Festival. At the end of 2007, she directed her first feature film, Antes Que o Mundo Acabe, based on the book by Marcelo Carneiro da Cunha, which was presented and awarded at some festivals, even before its commercial release, in May 2010. Between 2008 and 2009, Azevedo directed eight episodes of the series Fantasias de um Housewife for RBS TV. Azevedo worked on the pre-production of Mulher de Fases, a comedy series based on a book by Cláudia Tajes, which aired in 2011 on HBO Brasil.
