= Peasant leagues (Brazil) =

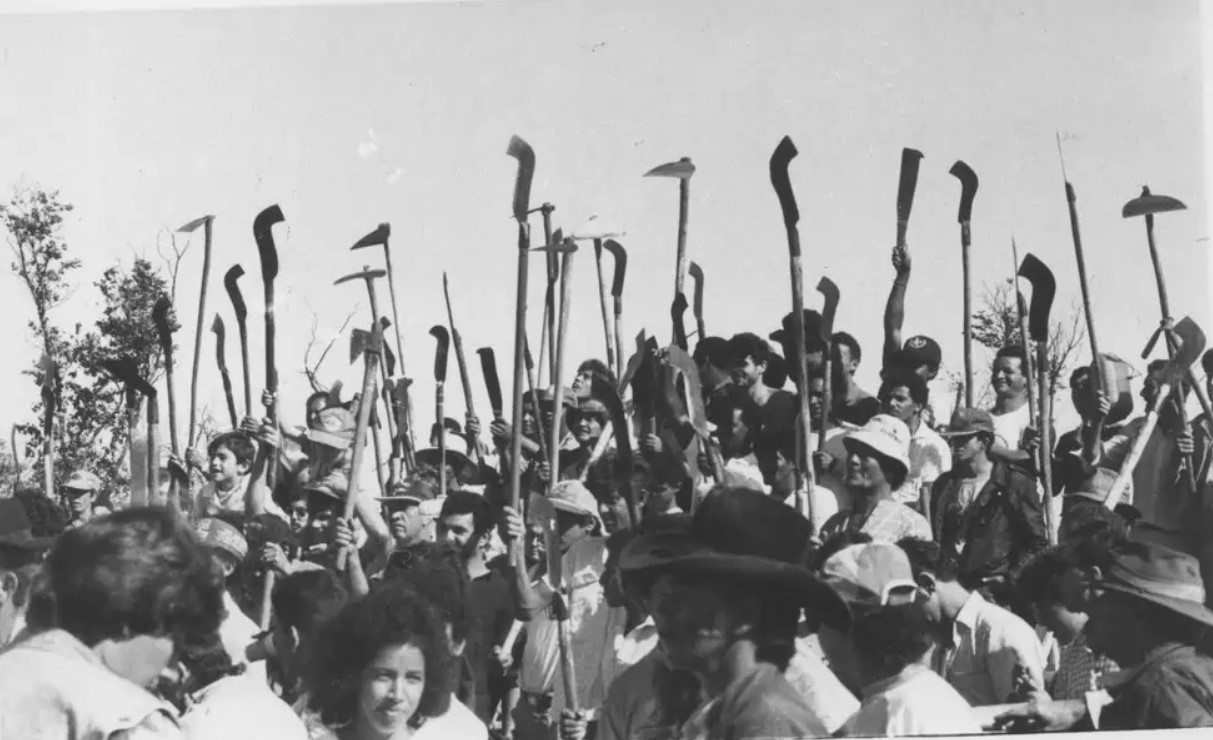
Meeting of peasants who participated in the Leagues from 1955 to 1964

The peasant leagues (Portuguese: ligas camponesas) were social organizations composed of sharecroppers, subsistence farmers and other small agriculturalists. They originated in the agreste region of Northeastern Brazil in the 1950s, organized by the Brazilian Communist Party (PCB), and were later picked up by Francisco Julião, a member of the Democratic Labor Party (PDT) and other socialists. The leagues were founded to improve rural workers' living standards; their later objective was to oppose the region's power of latifundia.

== History ==
Brazilian communists founded the leagues, who believed that the latifundia, which had always dominated the Brazilian economy, were in a semicolonial relationship with the United States and were conspiring to oppress the working class by forcing rural workers to produce cash crops instead of food for native consumption and refusing to develop land which could not support those crops, a belief partly shared by outsiders to communism. The goal of the communists was to raise the rural workers' standard of living sufficiently so that a classic Marxist capitalist-to-socialist transition could occur.

When the PCB began struggling with political pressure in the late 1950s, Francisco Julião began taking on the business of establishing and organizing leagues. In January 1955, Francisco Julião made one of the most important associations legal, the SAPPP, which used to fight for peasants' rights before its legalization.

Communists objected to his growing role in the movement. His attempts to unify the leagues and resistance to registering them as unions conflicted with their own goal of attaining legitimacy, and his use of violent revolutionary rhetoric made them worry about retaliation from the military and police.

== Reaction ==
The populist Brazilian government's attitude towards the leagues varied from neutral to positive over time, while that of the military and police was uniformly negative. The armed forces in the Brazilian Northeast had many connections to wealthy landowners whose enterprises were threatened by the activities of the leagues, and they would go to extraordinary lengths to curtail league activity. The Catholic Church established organizations in the Northeast that functioned similarly but were conservative and anti-communist in their outlook; the armed forces crushed these groups alongside the peasant leagues following the 1964 coup.

== See also ==
- Landless Workers' Movement
- League of Poor Peasants
- Tiradentes Revolutionary Movement (1961-1962)
