= List of people killed by and disappeared during the Brazilian military dictatorship =

Report of the National Truth Commission, volume III.

This is a list of the killed and politically disappeared people during the Brazilian military dictatorship. It brings together the political dead and disappeared in the Brazilian military dictatorship of 1964. The murders and disappearances of opponents of the military regime in Brazil were investigated by the National Truth Commission (CNV), by state truth commissions, by human rights entities and by victims' own relatives. In these various investigations, there is a discrepancy in the numbers of deaths and missing persons computed. The CNV, in its final report, recognized 434 political deaths and disappearances between 1946 and 1988, of which the majority occurred during the dictatorship.

Included in the list are cases found by:

- Special Commission on Political Deaths and Disappearances, established in 1995 and linked to the Human Rights Secretariat of the Presidency of the Republic, which accounted for 362 cases of political deaths and disappearances;
- Documentation Center Eremias Delizoicov and the Commission of Family Members of the Dead and Missing Politicians, which, in 2010, organized a website listing 383 political dead and missing persons;
- Memories of the Dictatorship, carried out by the Vladimir Herzog Institute, based on documents and data collected by CNV;
- Truth Commission of the State of São Paulo "Rubens Paiva", associated with the CNV and located in the Legislative Assembly of the State of São Paulo, with a focus on State crimes perpetrated in that state;
- National Truth Commission, volume 3, "Political dead and missing persons", published in December 2014.

== List ==
=== A ===
Image	Name	Born	Died	Occupation	Organisation	Ref.
	Abelardo Rausch de Alcântara	5 August 1927	13 February 1970	bank teller	no organisation	
	Abílio Clemente Filho	17 April 1949	date unknown (After 10 April 1971)	student	Ação Popular	
	Adauto Freire da Cruz	15 February 1924	13 May 1979	merchant	Peasant leagues	
	Aderval Alves Coqueiro	18 July 1937	6 February 1971	construction worker	Movimento Revolucionário Tiradentes	
	Adriano Fonseca Filho	18 December 1945	date unknown (After 29 November 1973)	student	Communist Party of Brazil	
	Afonso Henrique Martins Saldanha	22 September 1918	8 December 1974	teacher	Brazilian Communist Party	
	Albertino José de Oliveira	6 January 1914	29 April 1964	peasant	Peasant leagues	
	Alberto Aleixo	18 February 1903	7 August 1975	political activist	Brazilian Communist Party	
	Alceri Maria Gomes da Silva	25 May 1943	17 May 1970		Vanguarda Popular Revolucionária	
	Aldo de Sá Brito Souza Neto	20 January 1951	7 January 1971	student	Ação Libertadora Nacional	
	Alex de Paula Xavier Pereira	9 August 1949	20 January 1972	student	Ação Libertadora Nacional	
	Alexander José Ibsen Voerões	5 July 1952	27 February 1972	student	Movimento de Libertação Popular (Brazil)	
	Alexandre Vannucchi Leme	5 October 1950	17 March 1973	student	Ação Libertadora Nacional	
	Alfeu de Alcântara Monteiro	31 March 1922	4 April 1964	fighter pilot	no organisation	
	Almir Custódio de Lima	24 May 1950	27 October 1973	manual worker	Partido Comunista Brasileiro Revolucionário	
	Aluísio Palhano Pedreira Ferreira	5 September 1922	date unknown (After 9 May 1971)	politician	Vanguarda Popular Revolucionária	
	Amaro Félix Pereira	10 May 1929	date unknown (Between 1 January 1971 and 1 January 1972)	peasant	Revolutionary Communist Party	
	Amaro Luiz de Carvalho	4 June 1931	22 August 1971	peasant	Revolutionary Communist Party	
	Ana Kucinski	12 January 1942	date unknown (After 22 April 1974)		Ação Libertadora Nacional	
	Ana Maria Nacinovic Correa	25 March 1947	14 June 1972		Partido Comunista Brasileiro Revolucionário	
	Anatália de Souza Melo Alves	9 July 1945	22 January 1973		Partido Comunista Brasileiro Revolucionário	
	André Grabois	3 July 1946	date unknown (After 13 October 1973)	student	Communist Party of Brazil	
	Ângelo Arroyo	6 November 1928	16 December 1976	politician	Communist Party of Brazil	
	Ângelo Cardoso da Silva	27 October 1943	23 April 1970	taxi driver	Marx, Mao, Marighella, and Guevara	
	Ângelo Pezzuti da Silva	27 April 1946	11 September 1975	psychiatrist	Vanguarda Popular Revolucionária	
	Antogildo Pacoal Vianna	21 April 1927	8 April 1964	trade unionist	Federação Nacional dos Estivadores	
	Antônio Alfredo de Lima	1 January 1938	date unknown (After 13 October 1973)	peasant	Communist Party of Brazil	
	Antônio Araújo Veloso	4 December 1934	31 August 1976	peasant	no organisation	
	Antônio Bem Cardoso	21 September 1938	1 June 1970	farmer	Ação Libertadora Nacional	
	Antonio Benetazzo	1 November 1941	30 October 1972	journalist	Movimento de Libertação Popular (Brazil)	
	Antônio Carlos Bicalho Lana	2 March 1949	30 November 1973	student	Ação Libertadora Nacional	
	Antônio Carlos Monteiro Teixeira	22 August 1944	date unknown (After 20 September 1972)	geologist	Communist Party of Brazil	
	Antônio Carlos Nogueira Cabral	14 October 1948	12 April 1972	student	Ação Libertadora Nacional	
	Antônio Carlos Silveira Alves	date unknown	1 April 1964	student	not listed / unknown	
	Antônio de Pádua Costa	12 June 1943	date unknown (After 14 January 1974)	student	Ação Popular	
	Antônio dos Três Reis Oliveira	19 November 1948	10 May 1970	student	Ação Libertadora Nacional	
	Antônio Ferreira Pinto	16 July 1932	date unknown (Between 14 January 1974 and 30 April 1974)	tailor	Communist Party of Brazil	
	Antônio Guilherme Ribeiro Ribas	20 September 1946	date unknown (After 28 November 1973)	student	Communist Party of Brazil	
	Antônio Henrique Pereira Neto	28 October 1940	27 May 1969	teacher	no organisation	
	Antônio Joaquim Machado	13 September 1939	date unknown (After 15 February 1971)	lawyer	Vanguarda Armada Revolucionária Palmares	
	Antônio Marcos Pinto de Oliveira	16 February 1950	29 March 1972	seminarian	Partido Comunista do Brasil – Ala Vermelha	
	Antonio Pregoni	9 July 1936	21 November 1973	manual worker	Tupamaros	
	Antônio Raymundo Lucena	11 September 1921	20 February 1970	manual worker	Vanguarda Popular Revolucionária	
	Antônio Sérgio de Matos	18 February 1948	23 September 1971	student	Ação Libertadora Nacional	
	Antônio Teodoro de Castro	12 April 1945	date unknown (Between 25 December 1973 and 27 February 1974)	student	Communist Party of Brazil	
	Ari da Rocha Miranda	date unknown	11 June 1970	student	Ação Libertadora Nacional	
	Ari de Oliveira Mendes Cunha	date unknown	1 April 1964		no organisation	
	Arildo Valadão	28 December 1948	date unknown (After 24 November 1973)	student	Communist Party of Brazil	
	Armando Teixeira Frutuoso	20 May 1921	date unknown (After 7 September 1975)	electrician	Communist Party of Brazil	
	Arnaldo Cardoso Rocha	28 March 1949	15 March 1973	politician	Ação Libertadora Nacional	
	Arno Preis	8 July 1934	15 February 1972	lawyer	Movimento de Libertação Popular (Brazil)	
	Ary Abreu Lima da Rosa	28 May 1949	28 October 1970	student	Partido Operário Comunista	
	Ary Cabrera Prates	10 September 1931	date unknown (After 5 April 1976)	joiner	Organización Popular Revolucionaria – 33 Orientales	
	Augusto Soares da Cunha	3 June 1931	1 April 1964		no organisation	
	Áurea Eliza Pereira	6 April 1950	date unknown (After 13 June 1974)		Communist Party of Brazil	
	Aurora Maria Nascimento Furtado	17 June 1946	10 November 1972		Ação Libertadora Nacional	
	Avelmar Moreira de Barros	11 March 1917	24 March 1970	farmer	Vanguarda Armada Revolucionária Palmares	
	Aylton Adalberto Mortati	13 January 1946	date unknown (After 4 November 1971)	pianist	Movimento de Libertação Popular (Brazil)	

=== B ===
Image	Name	Born	Died	Occupation	Organisation	Ref.
	Batista	date unknown	date unknown (After 30 April 1974)		no organisation	
	Benedito Gonçalves	20 August 1931	20 August 1979	manual worker	not listed / unknown	
	Benedito Pereira Serra	8 May 1913	16 May 1964	trade unionist	União dos Lavradores e Trabalhadores Agrícolas do Pará	
	Bergson Gurjão Farias	17 May 1947	date unknown (After 8 May 1972)	student	Araguaia guerrilla	
	Bernardino Saraiva	date unknown	14 April 1964	military personnel	not listed / unknown	
	Boanerges de Souza Massa	7 January 1938	date unknown (After 21 December 1971)	physician	Movimento de Libertação Popular (Brazil)	

=== C ===
Image	Name	Born	Died	Occupation	Organisation	Ref.
	Caiupy Alves de Castro	16 August 1928	date unknown (After 21 November 1973)	bank teller	not listed / unknown	
	Carlos Alberto Soares de Freitas	12 August 1939	15 February 1971	journalist	Vanguarda Armada Revolucionária Palmares	
	Carlos Antunes da Silva	12 September 1939	16 January 1970	clerk	Grupos dos Onze	
	Carlos Eduardo Pires Fleury	5 January 1945	10 December 1971	student	Movimento de Libertação Popular (Brazil)	
	Carlos Lamarca	27 October 1937	17 September 1971	revolutionary	Vanguarda Popular Revolucionária	
	Carlos Marighella	5 December 1911	4 November 1969	writer	Ação Libertadora Nacional	
	Carlos Nicolau Danielli	14 September 1929	30 December 1972	politician	Communist Party of Brazil	
	Carlos Roberto Zanirato	9 November 1949	29 June 1969	soldier	Vanguarda Popular Revolucionária	
	Carlos Schirmer	30 March 1896	1 May 1964	electrician	Communist Party of Brazil	
	Carmem Jacomini	19 May 1940	1 April 1977		Vanguarda Popular Revolucionária	
	Cassimiro Luiz de Freitas	11 December 1912	19 March 1970	farmer	Vanguarda Armada Revolucionária Palmares	
	Catarina Helena Abi-Eçab	29 January 1947	8 November 1968		Ação Libertadora Nacional	
	Célio Augusto Guedes	21 June 1920	15 August 1972	dentist	Brazilian Communist Party	
	Celso Gilberto de Oliveira	26 June 1945	30 December 1970	estate agent	Vanguarda Popular Revolucionária	
	Chael Charles Schreier	23 September 1946	24 November 1969	student	Vanguarda Armada Revolucionária Palmares	
	Cilon da Cunha Brum	3 February 1943	date unknown (After 1 December 1973)	student	Communist Party of Brazil	
	Ciro Flávio Salasar Oliveira	26 December 1943	30 September 1972	student	Communist Party of Brazil	
	Cloves Dias Amorim	22 July 1946	23 October 1968	manual worker	not listed / unknown	
	Custódio Saraiva Neto	5 April 1952	15 December 1973	high school student	Communist Party of Brazil	

=== D ===
Image	Name	Born	Died	Occupation	Organisation	References
	Daniel José de Carvalho	13 October 1945	13 July 1974	chauffeur / chauffeuse	Vanguarda Popular Revolucionária	
	Daniel Ribeiro Callado	16 October 1940	28 June 1974	metallurgist	Communist Party of Brazil	
	Darcy José dos Santos Mariante	29 November 1928	8 April 1966	military personnel	Grupos dos Onze	
	David Capistrano da Costa	16 November 1913	date unknown (After 19 March 1974)	politician	Brazilian Communist Party	
	David de Souza Meira	22 June 1943	1 April 1968	clerk	not listed / unknown	
	David Eduardo Chab Tarab Baabour	2 May 1954	date unknown (After 10 June 1976)	student	no organisation	
	Dênis Casemiro	9 December 1942	18 May 1971	farmer	Vanguarda Popular Revolucionária	
	Dermeval da Silva Pereira	16 January 1945	date unknown (After 28 March 1974)	lawyer	Communist Party of Brazil	
	Devanir José de Carvalho	15 July 1943	7 April 1971	manual worker	Movimento Revolucionário Tiradentes	
	Dilermano Melo Nascimento	9 February 1920	15 August 1964	economist	not listed / unknown	
	Dimas Antônio Casemiro	6 March 1946	date unknown (Between 17 April 1971 and 19 April 1971)	typographer	Movimento Revolucionário Tiradentes	
	Dinaelza Coqueiro	22 March 1949	8 April 1974		Communist Party of Brazil	
	Dinalva Oliveira Teixeira	16 May 1945	date unknown (After 25 December 1973)		Communist Party of Brazil	
	Divino Ferreira de Souza	12 September 1942	date unknown (Between 13 October 1973 and 14 October 1973)	merchant	Communist Party of Brazil	
	Divo Fernandes D’Oliveira	3 January 1895	date unknown (After 1 January 1964)	sailor	Brazilian Communist Party	
	Djalma Maranhão	27 November 1915	30 July 1971	politician	Partido Trabalhista Nacional	
	Dorival Ferreira	5 November 1931	3 April 1970	mechanic	Ação Libertadora Nacional	
	Durvalino de Souza	23 October 1947	date unknown (After 1 January 1973)	student	not listed / unknown	

=== E ===
Image	Name	Born	Died	Occupation	Organisation	References
	Edgar Aquino Duarte	22 February 1941	1 June 1973	estate agent	no organisation	
	Edmur Péricles Camargo	4 November 1914	date unknown (After 16 June 1971)	journalist	Marx, Mao, Marighella, and Guevara	
	Edson Luís de Lima Souto	24 February 1950	28 March 1968	student	no organisation	
	Edson Neves Quaresma	11 December 1939	5 December 1970	sailor	Vanguarda Popular Revolucionária	
	Edu Barreto Leite	20 August 1940	13 April 1964	military personnel	not listed / unknown	
	Eduardo Antônio da Fonseca	23 February 1947	23 September 1971	high school student	Ação Libertadora Nacional	
	Eduardo Collen Leite	28 August 1945	8 December 1970	political activist	Ação Libertadora Nacional	
	Eduardo Collier Filho	5 December 1948	date unknown (After 23 February 1974)	student	Ação Popular	
	Eduardo Gonzalo Escabosa	5 March 1947	2 August 1980	political activist	Montoneros	
	Eiraldo de Palha Freire	15 May 1946	4 July 1970	stockbroker	Ação Libertadora Nacional	
	Elmo Corrêa	16 April 1946	date unknown (Between 25 December 1973 and 14 August 1974)	student	Communist Party of Brazil	
	Elson Costa	26 August 1913	15 January 1975	politician	Brazilian Communist Party	
	Elvaristo Alves da Silva	28 December 1923	10 April 1965	farmer	Brazilian Labour Party	
	Emmanuel Bezerra dos Santos	17 June 1947	4 September 1973	student	Revolutionary Communist Party	
	Enrique Ernesto Ruggia	25 July 1955	13 July 1974	student	Vanguarda Popular Revolucionária	
	Epaminondas Gomes de Oliveira	16 November 1902	20 August 1971	politician	Worker's Revolutionary Party	
	Eremias Delizoicov	27 March 1951	16 October 1969	student	Vanguarda Popular Revolucionária	
	Esmeraldina Carvalho Cunha	1 April 1922	20 October 1972		not listed / unknown	
	Eudaldo Gomes da Silva	1 October 1947	date unknown (Between 7 January 1973 and 9 January 1973)	student	Vanguarda Popular Revolucionária	
	Evaldo Luiz Ferreira de Souza	5 June 1942	date unknown (Between 7 January 1973 and 9 January 1973)	veteran	Movimento Nacionalista Revolucionário	
	Ezequias Bezerra da Rocha	24 December 1944	date unknown (After 11 March 1972)	geologist	Communist Party of Brazil	

=== F ===
Image	Name	Born	Died	Occupation	Organisation	References
	Feliciano Eugênio Neto	11 May 1920	29 September 1976	resistance fighter	Brazilian Communist Party	
	Félix Escobar Sobrinho	22 March 1923	date unknown (Between 1 September 1971 and 1 October 1971)	merchant	Brazilian Communist Party	
	Fernando Augusto Valente da Fonseca	13 January 1946	29 December 1972	bank teller	Partido Comunista Brasileiro Revolucionário	
	Fernando Borges de Paula Ferreira	1 October 1945	29 July 1969	student	Vanguarda Armada Revolucionária Palmares	
	Fernando da Silva Lembo	5 July 1952	21 June 1968	merchant	not listed / unknown	
	Fernando Santa Cruz	20 February 1948	date unknown (After 23 February 1974)	student	Ação Popular	
	Flávio Carvalho Molina	8 November 1947	7 November 1971	student	União Nacional dos Estudantes	
	Flávio Ferreira da Silva	7 December 1934	14 April 1975	journalist	not listed / unknown	
	Francisco das Chagas Pereira	2 April 1944	date unknown (After 6 August 1971)	police officer	Brazilian Communist Party	
	Francisco Emanuel Penteado	29 December 1952	1 March 1973	pupil	Movimento de Libertação Popular (Brazil)	
	Francisco José de Oliveira	5 April 1943	5 November 1971	student	Movimento de Libertação Popular (Brazil)	
	Francisco Manoel Chaves	18 April 1906	21 September 1972	politician	Communist Party of Brazil	
	Francisco Seiko Okama	2 May 1947	15 March 1973	metallurgist	Ação Libertadora Nacional	
	Francisco Tenório Júnior	4 July 1941	date unknown (After 18 March 1976)	pianist	not listed / unknown	
	Frederico Eduardo Mayr	29 October 1948	24 February 1972	student	Movimento de Libertação Popular (Brazil)	
	Frei Tito	14 September 1945	10 August 1974	dominican friar	União Cearense de Estudantes Secundaristas	

=== G ===
Image	Name	Born	Died	Occupation	Organisation	References
	Gastone Lúcia Carvalho Beltrão	12 January 1950	22 January 1972		Ação Libertadora Nacional	
	Gelson Reicher	20 February 1949	20 January 1972	student	Ação Libertadora Nacional	
	Geraldo Bernardo da Silva	20 August 1925	17 July 1969	elevator operator	Comitê Sindical dos Ferroviários da Estrada de Ferro Central do Brasil	
	Gerardo Magela Fernandes Torres da Costa	1 January 1950	28 May 1973	poet	no organisation	
	Gerosina Silva Pereira	15 July 1918	9 September 1978		Vanguarda Popular Revolucionária	
	Gerson Theodoro de Oliveira	31 August 1947	22 March 1971	bank teller	Vanguarda Popular Revolucionária	
	Getúlio de Oliveira Cabral	4 April 1942	date unknown (After 29 December 1972)	manual worker	Partido Comunista Brasileiro Revolucionário	
	Gilberto Olímpio Maria	11 March 1942	date unknown (After 25 December 1973)	journalist	Communist Party of Brazil	
	Gildo Macedo Lacerda	8 July 1949	date unknown (After 28 October 1973)	student	Ação Popular	
	Grenaldo de Jesus da Silva	17 April 1941	30 May 1972	sailor	no organisation	
	Guido Leão	1 January 1956	27 September 1979	metallurgist	not listed / unknown	
	Guilherme Gomes Lund	11 July 1947	date unknown (After 25 December 1973)	student	Communist Party of Brazil	
	Gustavo Buarque Schiller	19 November 1950	22 September 1985	sociologist	Vanguarda Armada Revolucionária Palmares	

=== H ===
Image	Name	Born	Died	Occupation	Organisation	References
	Hamilton Fernando da Cunha	1 January 1941	11 February 1969	politician	Vanguarda Popular Revolucionária	
	Hamilton Pereira Damasceno	15 March 1948	date unknown (After 1 February 1972)		Ação Libertadora Nacional	
	Helber José Gomes Goulart	19 September 1944	16 July 1973	typist	Ação Libertadora Nacional	
	Hélcio Pereira Fortes	24 January 1948	30 January 1972	politician	Ação Libertadora Nacional	
	Helenira Resende de Souza Nazareth	11 January 1944	date unknown (Between 28 September 1972 and 30 September 1972)		União Nacional dos Estudantes	
	Heleny Ferreira Telles Guariba	17 March 1941	date unknown (After 12 July 1971)		Vanguarda Popular Revolucionária	
	Hélio Luiz Navarro de Magalhães	23 November 1949	14 March 1974	student	Communist Party of Brazil	
	Henrique Cintra Ferreira Ornellas	1 January 1920	21 August 1973	lawyer	no organisation	
	Higino João Pio	11 January 1922	3 March 1969	merchant	Social Democratic Party	
	Hiram de Lima Pereira	3 October 1913	date unknown (After 15 January 1975)	actor	Brazilian Communist Party	
	Hiroaki Torigoe	2 December 1944	5 January 1972	student	Movimento de Libertação Popular (Brazil)	
	Honestino Guimarães	28 March 1947	date unknown (After 10 October 1973)	student	Ação Popular	
	Horacio Domingo Campiglia	6 June 1949	date unknown (After 12 March 1980)	student	Montoneros	

=== I ===
Image	Name	Born	Died	Occupation	Organisation	References
	Idalísio Soares Aranha Filho	21 August 1947	date unknown (After 13 June 1972)	student	Araguaia guerrilla	
	Ieda Santos Delgado	9 July 1945	date unknown (After 11 April 1974)		Ação Libertadora Nacional	
	Iguatemi Zuchi Teixeira	6 February 1944	3 July 1968	merchant	not listed / unknown	
	Inocêncio Pereira Alves	1 January 1900	18 March 1967	tailor	Brazilian Communist Party	
	Íris Amaral	date unknown (Between 1 January 1946 and 31 December 1947)	1 February 1972		not listed / unknown	
	Ishiro Nagami	1 January 1941	4 September 1969	teacher	Ação Libertadora Nacional	
	Ísis Dias de Oliveira	29 August 1941	30 January 1972		Ação Libertadora Nacional	
	Ismael Silva de Jesus	12 August 1953	9 August 1972	high school student	Communist Party of Brazil	
	Israel Tavares Roque	3 January 1929	date unknown (After 15 November 1964)	newspaper editor	Brazilian Communist Party	
	Issami Nakamura Okano	25 November 1945	date unknown (After 14 May 1974)	student	Ação Libertadora Nacional	
	Itair José Veloso	10 June 1930	date unknown (After 25 May 1975)	manual worker	Brazilian Communist Party	
	Iuri Xavier Pereira	2 August 1948	14 June 1972	student	Ação Libertadora Nacional	
	Ivan Mota Dias	29 October 1942	date unknown (After 15 May 1971)	student	Vanguarda Popular Revolucionária	
	Ivan Rocha Aguiar	14 December 1941	1 April 1964	high school student	Brazilian Communist Party	

=== J ===
Image	Name	Born	Died	Occupation	Organisation	References
	Jaime Petit da Silva	18 June 1945	date unknown (After 22 December 1973)	teacher	Communist Party of Brazil	
	James Allen da Luz	21 December 1938	date unknown (Between 24 March 1973 and 16 November 1977)	student	Vanguarda Armada Revolucionária Palmares	
	Jana Moroni Barroso	10 June 1948	date unknown (Between 2 January 1974 and 8 February 1974)		Communist Party of Brazil	
	Jane Vanini	8 September 1945	6 December 1974		Movimento de Libertação Popular (Brazil)	
	Jarbas Pereira Marques	27 August 1948	date unknown (Between 7 January 1973 and 9 January 1973)	merchant	Vanguarda Popular Revolucionária	
	Jayme Amorim Miranda	18 June 1926	date unknown (After 4 February 1975)	journalist	Brazilian Communist Party	
	Jean Henri Raya	4 August 1944	date unknown (After 21 November 1973)	employee	not listed / unknown	
	Jeová Assis Gomes	24 August 1943	9 January 1972	physicist	Movimento de Libertação Popular (Brazil)	
	João Alfredo Dias	23 June 1932	date unknown (After 1 September 1964)	trade unionist	Brazilian Communist Party	
	João Antônio Santos Abi-Eçab	4 June 1943	8 November 1968	student	Ação Libertadora Nacional	
	João Barcellos Martins	23 April 1898	11 April 1964	physician	Brazilian Socialist Party	
	João Batista Franco Drummond	28 May 1942	16 December 1976	economist	Ação Popular	
	João Batista Rita	24 July 1948	date unknown (After 5 December 1973)	student	Vanguarda Popular Revolucionária	
	João Bosco Burnier	11 June 1917	11 October 1976	priest	Conselho Indigenista Missionário	
	João Carlos Cavalcanti Reis	8 August 1945	30 October 1972	student	Movimento de Libertação Popular (Brazil)	
	João Carlos Haas Sobrinho	24 June 1941	date unknown (After 30 September 1972)	partisan	Communist Party of Brazil	
	João de Carvalho Barros	24 July 1908	2 April 1964	veterinarian	Brazilian Labour Party	
	João Domingues da Silva	2 April 1949	23 September 1969	manual worker	Vanguarda Armada Revolucionária Palmares	
	João Gualberto Calatroni	7 January 1951	date unknown (After 13 October 1973)	student	Communist Party of Brazil	
	João Leonardo Rocha	4 August 1939	1 June 1975	teacher	Movimento de Libertação Popular (Brazil)	
	João Lucas Alves	3 November 1935	6 March 1969	military officer	Comando de Libertação Nacional	
	João Massena Melo	16 August 1919	date unknown (After 3 April 1974)	politician	Brazilian Communist Party	
	João Mendes Araújo	28 July 1943	25 January 1972	farmer	Ação Libertadora Nacional	
	João Roberto Borges de Souza	14 October 1946	10 October 1969	student	Brazilian Communist Party	
	Joaquim Alencar de Seixas	2 January 1922	17 April 1971	manual worker	Movimento Revolucionário Tiradentes	
	Joaquim Câmara Ferreira	5 September 1913	23 October 1970	journalist	Ação Libertadora Nacional	
	Joaquim Pires Cerveira	14 December 1923	date unknown (After 5 December 1973)	military personnel	National Liberation Front	
	Joaquinzão	date unknown	1 January 1973	peasant	not listed / unknown	
	Joel José de Carvalho	13 July 1948	date unknown (After 13 July 1974)	manual worker	Partido Comunista do Brasil – Ala Vermelha	
	Joel Vasconcelos Santos	9 August 1949	19 March 1971	student	Communist Party of Brazil	
	Joelson Crispim	16 April 1946	22 April 1970	manual worker	Vanguarda Popular Revolucionária	
	Jonas José Albuquerque Barros	15 June 1946	1 April 1964	student	Movimento estudantil brasileiro	
	Jorge Alberto Basso	17 February 1951	date unknown (After 15 April 1976)	history teacher	Partido Operário Comunista	
	Jorge Aprígio de Paula	10 February 1938	2 April 1968	manual worker	not listed / unknown	
	Jorge Leal Gonçalves Pereira	25 December 1938	20 October 1970	engineer	Ação Popular	
	Jorge Oscar Adur (Padre)	19 March 1932	date unknown (After 26 June 1980)	Catholic priest	Montoneros	
	José Bartolomeu Rodrigues de Souza	5 May 1949	29 December 1972	high school student	Ação Popular	
	José Campos Barreto	2 October 1946	17 September 1971	trade unionist	Vanguarda Popular Revolucionária	
	José Carlos da Costa	date unknown	date unknown (After 3 December 1973)	manual worker	Vanguarda Armada Revolucionária Palmares	
	José Carlos Novaes da Mata Machado	20 March 1946	28 October 1973	student	Ação Popular	
	José Dalmo Guimarães Lins	13 March 1937	11 February 1971	reseller	Brazilian Communist Party	
	José de Oliveira	date unknown	date unknown	peasant	no organisation	
	José de Souza	1 January 1931	17 April 1964	trade unionist	no organisation	
	José Ferreira de Almeida	16 December 1911	8 August 1975	military personnel	Brazilian Communist Party	
	José Gomes Teixeira	30 September 1941	23 June 1971	sailor	Revolutionary Movement 8th October	
	José Guimarães	4 June 1948	3 October 1968	student	not listed / unknown	
	José Huberto Bronca	8 September 1934	25 December 1973	manual worker	Communist Party of Brazil	
	José Idésio Brianezi	23 March 1946	13 April 1970	salesperson	Ação Libertadora Nacional	
	José Inocêncio Barreto	16 October 1940	5 October 1972	peasant		
	José Júlio de Araújo	22 July 1943	18 August 1972	merchant	Ação Libertadora Nacional	
	José Lavecchia	25 May 1919	17 July 1970	cobbler	Vanguarda Popular Revolucionária	
	José Lima Piauhy Dourado	date unknown (Between 24 March 1946 and 30 March 1946)	date unknown (Between 24 December 1973 and 25 January 1974)	camera operator	Communist Party of Brazil	
	José Manoel da Silva	2 December 1940	date unknown (After 7 January 1973)	merchant	Vanguarda Popular Revolucionária	
	José Maria Ferreira Araújo	6 June 1941	23 September 1970	politician	Vanguarda Popular Revolucionária	
	José Maurílio Patrício	13 September 1944	1 October 1974	student	Communist Party of Brazil	
	José Maximino de Andrade Netto	20 September 1913	18 August 1975	military personnel	Brazilian Communist Party	
	José Mendes de Sá Roriz	30 December 1927	17 February 1973	military personnel	Brazilian Communist Party	
	José Milton Barbosa	22 October 1939	5 December 1971	politician	Ação Libertadora Nacional	
	José Montenegro de Lima	27 October 1943	date unknown (After 29 September 1975)	technician	Brazilian Communist Party	
	José Nobre Parente	17 October 1928	20 May 1966	railway worker	not listed / unknown	
	José Pinheiro Jobim	2 August 1909	24 March 1979	diplomat	Brazilian Communist Party	
	José Porfírio de Sousa	12 July 1913	date unknown (After 7 July 1973)	politician	Worker's Revolutionary Party	
	José Raimundo da Costa	28 December 1939	date unknown (After 5 August 1971)	military personnel	Vanguarda Popular Revolucionária	
	José Roberto Arantes de Almeida	7 February 1943	4 November 1971	student	Movimento de Libertação Popular (Brazil)	
	José Roberto Spigner	30 December 1948	17 February 1970	student	Revolutionary Movement 8th October	
	José Roman	1 October 1904	date unknown (After 19 March 1974)	metallurgist	Brazilian Communist Party	
	José Sabino	date unknown	19 May 1966		no organisation	
	José Silton Pinheiro	31 May 1949	29 December 1972	student	Partido Comunista Brasileiro Revolucionário	
	José Soares dos Santos	1 January 1952	1 January 1977	mechanic	Guerrilha de Três Passos	
	José Toledo de Oliveira	17 July 1941	21 September 1972	lawyer	Brazilian Communist Party	
	José Wilson Lessa Sabag	25 October 1943	3 September 1969	student	Ação Libertadora Nacional	
	Juan Antonio Carrasco Forrastal	30 January 1945	28 October 1972	student	not listed / unknown	
	Juarez Guimarães de Brito	22 January 1938	18 April 1970	sociologist	Vanguarda Popular Revolucionária	
	Juarez Rodrigues Coelho	date unknown	date unknown (After 14 August 1972)	peasant	not listed / unknown	
	Juvelino Andrés Carneiro Da Fontoura Gularte	4 February 1943	date unknown (After 30 December 1977)	student	Revolutionary Communist Party of Uruguay	

=== K ===
Image	Name	Born	Died	Occupation	Organisation	References
	Kleber Lemos da Silva	21 May 1942	date unknown (Between 29 June 1972 and 1 July 1972)	economist	Communist Party of Brazil	

=== L ===
Image	Name	Born	Died	Occupation	Organisation	References
	Labibe Elias Abduch	1 January 1899	1 April 1964		no organisation	
	Lauriberto José Reyes	2 March 1945	27 February 1972	student	Movimento de Libertação Popular (Brazil)	
	Leopoldo Chiapetti	17 June 1906	21 May 1965	farmer	Grupos dos Onze	
	Líbero Giancarlo Castiglia	4 July 1944	date unknown (After 25 December 1973)	metallurgist	Communist Party of Brazil	
	Lígia Maria Salgado Nóbrega	30 July 1947	29 March 1972		Vanguarda Armada Revolucionária Palmares	
	Liliana Inés Goldemberg	17 September 1953	2 August 1980		Montoneros	
	Lincoln Bicalho Roque	25 May 1945	13 March 1973	teacher	Communist Party of Brazil	
	Lincoln Cordeiro Oest	17 June 1907	21 December 1972	journalist	Communist Party of Brazil	
	Lorenzo Ismael Viñas	20 June 1955	26 June 1980	student	Montoneros	
	Lourdes Maria Wanderley Pontes	31 March 1943	29 December 1972		Partido Comunista Brasileiro Revolucionário	
	Lourenço Camelo de Mesquita	18 August 1926	30 July 1977	taxi driver	Brazilian Communist Party	
	Lourival de Moura Paulino	1 January 1917	21 May 1972	merchant	not listed / unknown	
	Lúcia Maria de Souza	22 June 1944	24 October 1973		Communist Party of Brazil	
	Lucimar Brandão Guimarães	8 February 1949	31 July 1970	student	Vanguarda Armada Revolucionária Palmares	
	Lucindo Costa	29 May 1919	26 July 1967	civil servant	Communist Party of Brazil	
	Lúcio Petit da Silva	1 December 1943	28 April 1974	engineer	Communist Party of Brazil	
	Luís Alberto Andrade de Sá e Benevides	28 September 1942	8 March 1972	student	Partido Comunista Brasileiro Revolucionário	
	Luís Antônio Santa Bárbara	8 December 1946	28 August 1971	typographer	Revolutionary Movement 8th October	
	Luis Paulo da Cruz Nunes	13 October 1947	22 October 1968	student	Movimento estudantil brasileiro	
	Luiz Affonso Miranda da Costa Rodrigues	1 January 1951	25 January 1970	student	Ação Libertadora Nacional	
	Luiz Almeida Araújo	27 August 1943	24 June 1971	student	Ação Libertadora Nacional	
	Luiz Carlos Almeida	25 November 1945	14 September 1973	university teacher	Partido Operário Comunista	
	Luiz Carlos Augusto	18 November 1944	23 October 1968	clerk	not listed / unknown	
	Luiz Eduardo Merlino	18 October 1948	19 July 1971	journalist	Partido Operário Comunista	
	Luiz Eurico Tejera Lisbôa	19 January 1948	2 September 1972	clerk	Ação Libertadora Nacional	
	Luiz Fogaça Balboni	25 May 1945	25 September 1969	drawer	Ação Libertadora Nacional	
	Luiz Ghilardini	1 June 1920	4 January 1973	manual worker	Communist Party of Brazil	
	Luiz Gonzaga dos Santos	18 June 1919	13 September 1967	politician	Brazilian Communist Party	
	Luiz Hirata	23 November 1944	20 December 1971	student	Ação Popular	
	Luiz Ignácio Maranhão Filho	25 January 1921	date unknown (After 3 April 1974)	journalist	Brazilian Communist Party	
	Luiz José da Cunha	2 September 1943	13 July 1973	politician	Ação Libertadora Nacional	
	Luiz Renato do Lago Faria	22 October 1952	date unknown (After 7 February 1980)	student	not listed / unknown	
	Luiz Renato Pires de Almeida	18 November 1944	2 October 1970	student	Ñancahuazú Guerrilla	
	Luiz René Silveira e Silva	15 July 1951	date unknown (Between 19 January 1974 and 1 March 1974)	student	Communist Party of Brazil	
	Luiz Vieira	date unknown	1 December 1973	peasant	Communist Party of Brazil	
	Luiza Garlippe	16 October 1941	date unknown (After 25 December 1973)		Communist Party of Brazil	
	Lyda Monteiro da Silva	5 December 1920	27 August 1980		not listed / unknown	

=== M ===
Image	Name	Born	Died	Occupation	Organisation	References
	Manoel Aleixo da Silva	4 June 1931	29 August 1973	peasant	Revolutionary Communist Party	
	Manoel Alves de Oliveira	21 October 1934	8 May 1964	military personnel	Brazilian Communist Party	
	Manoel Custodio Martins	22 May 1934	7 February 1978	teacher	Brazilian Labour Party	
	Manoel Fiel Filho	7 January 1927	17 January 1976	metallurgist	Brazilian Communist Party	
	Manoel José Mendes Nunes de Abreu	1 January 1949	23 September 1971	student	Ação Libertadora Nacional	
	Manoel José Nurchis	19 December 1940	30 September 1972	manual worker	Araguaia guerrilla	
	Manoel Lisboa de Moura	21 February 1944	4 September 1973	student	Revolutionary Communist Party	
	Manoel Raimundo Soares	15 March 1936	date unknown (Between 13 August 1966 and 20 August 1966)	military personnel	Guerrilha de Três Passos	
	Manoel Rodrigues Ferreira	6 March 1950	5 August 1968	merchant	not listed / unknown	
	Márcio Beck Machado	16 January 1943	17 May 1973	student	Movimento de Libertação Popular (Brazil)	
	Marco Antônio Brás de Carvalho	5 January 1940	28 January 1969	politician	Ação Libertadora Nacional	
	Marcos Antônio da Silva Lima	21 October 1941	14 January 1970	military personnel	Partido Comunista Brasileiro Revolucionário	
	Marcos Antônio Dias Baptista	7 August 1954	date unknown (After 1 May 1970)	high school student	União Brasileira dos Estudantes Secundaristas	
	Marcos Basílio Arocena da Silva Guimarães	10 December 1940	date unknown (After 9 July 1976)	playwright	not listed / unknown	
	Marcos José de Lima	3 November 1947	date unknown (After 20 December 1973)	manual worker	Communist Party of Brazil	
	Marcos Nonato Fonseca	1 June 1953	14 June 1972	high school student	Ação Libertadora Nacional	
	Margarida Maria Alves	5 August 1933	12 August 1983		Sindicato dos Trabalhadores Rurais de Alagoa Grande	
	Maria Ângela Ribeiro	1 January 1946	21 June 1968		not listed / unknown	
	Maria Augusta Thomaz	14 November 1947	date unknown (After 17 May 1973)		Movimento de Libertação Popular (Brazil)	
	Maria Auxiliadora Lara Barcelos	25 March 1945	1 June 1976		Vanguarda Armada Revolucionária Palmares	
	Maria Célia Corrêa	30 April 1945	date unknown (After 2 January 1974)		Communist Party of Brazil	
	Maria Lúcia Petit	20 March 1950	16 June 1972		Communist Party of Brazil	
	Maria Regina Lobo Leite Figueiredo	5 June 1938	29 March 1972		Vanguarda Armada Revolucionária Palmares	
	Maria Regina Marcondes Pinto	17 July 1946	date unknown (After 10 April 1976)		Revolutionary Left Movement	
	Mariano Joaquim da Silva	date unknown (Between 2 May 1930 and 8 May 1930)	date unknown (After 31 May 1971)	cobbler	Vanguarda Armada Revolucionária Palmares	
	Marilene Villas-Boas	8 July 1948	3 April 1971		Revolutionary Movement 8th October	
	Mário Alves	14 June 1923	17 January 1970	politician	Partido Comunista Brasileiro Revolucionário	
	Mário de Souza Prata	26 September 1945	3 April 1971	student	Revolutionary Movement 8th October	
	Massafumi Yoshinaga	22 January 1949	7 June 1976	student	Vanguarda Popular Revolucionária	
	Maurício Grabois	2 October 1912	25 December 1973	politician	Brazilian Communist Party	
	Maurício Guilherme da Silveira	3 February 1951	22 March 1971	student	Vanguarda Popular Revolucionária	
	Merival Araújo	4 January 1949	14 April 1973	teacher		
	Miguel Pereira dos Santos	12 July 1943	21 September 1972	bank teller	Communist Party of Brazil	
	Miguel Sabat Nuet	12 March 1923	date unknown (After 30 November 1973)	salesperson	not listed / unknown	
	Milton Soares de Castro	23 June 1940	28 April 1967	metallurgist	Movimento Nacionalista Revolucionário	
	Míriam Lopes Verbena	11 February 1946	8 March 1972		Partido Comunista Brasileiro Revolucionário	
	Mónica Suzana Pinus de Binstock	30 January 1953	date unknown (After 12 March 1980)		Montoneros	

=== N ===
Image	Name	Born	Died	Occupation	Organisation	References
	Napoleão Felipe Biscaldi	1 January 1911	27 February 1972	retired	no organisation	
	Nativo da Natividade de Oliveira	20 November 1953	1 January 1985	politician	Central Única dos Trabalhadores	
	Neide Alves dos Santos	12 September 1944	7 January 1976		Communist Party of Brazil	
	Nelson de Souza Kohl	25 January 1940	17 September 1973	translator	Partido Operário Comunista	
	Nelson José de Almeida	1 October 1947	date unknown (After 11 April 1969)	student	Comando de Libertação Nacional	
	Nelson Lima Piauhy Dourado	3 May 1941	2 January 1974	civil servant	Communist Party of Brazil	
	Nestor Vera	19 May 1915	date unknown (After 1 April 1975)	farmer	Brazilian Communist Party	
	Newton Eduardo de Oliveira	13 October 1921	1 September 1964	trade unionist	Comando Geral dos Trabalhadores	
	Nilda Carvalho Cunha	5 July 1954	14 November 1971		Revolutionary Movement 8th October	
	Nilton Rosa da Silva	2 February 1949	15 June 1973	student	Revolutionary Left Movement	
	Norberto Armando Habeger	9 August 1941	date unknown (After 31 July 1978)	journalist	Montoneros	
	Norberto Nehring	20 September 1940	24 April 1970	economist	Ação Libertadora Nacional	

=== O ===
Image	Name	Born	Died	Occupation	Organisation	References
	Odair José Brunocilla	18 November 1937	date unknown (After 6 May 1978)	dispatcher	not listed / unknown	
	Odijas Carvalho de Souza	21 October 1945	8 February 1971	student	Partido Comunista Brasileiro Revolucionário	
	Olavo Hanssen	14 December 1937	8 May 1970	metallurgist	Partido Operário Revolucionário Trotskista	
	Onofre Ilha Dornelles	21 July 1918	28 December 1964	railway worker	Brazilian Labour Party	
	Onofre Pinto	26 January 1937	date unknown (After 13 July 1974)	manual worker	Vanguarda Popular Revolucionária	
	Orlando da Silva Rosa Bonfim Júnior	14 January 1915	date unknown (After 8 October 1975)	lawyer	Brazilian Communist Party	
	Orlando Momente	10 October 1933	25 January 1974	politician	Communist Party of Brazil	
	Ornalino Cândido da Silva	1 January 1949	1 April 1968	car washer	Movimento estudantil brasileiro	
	Orocílio Martins Gonçalves	23 October 1954	30 July 1979	manual worker	Movimento dos Trabalhadores na Construção Civil	
	Osvaldão	27 April 1938	date unknown (After 7 February 1974)	engineer	Communist Party of Brazil	
	Otávio Soares Ferreira da Cunha	1 January 1898	4 April 1964	pharmacist	not listed / unknown	
	Otoniel Campo Barreto	11 April 1951	28 August 1971	peasant	Revolutionary Movement 8th October	

=== P ===
Image	Name	Born	Died	Occupation	Organisation	References
	Pauline Philipe Reichstul	18 July 1947	date unknown (After 7 January 1973)		Vanguarda Popular Revolucionária	
	Paulo César Botelho Massa	5 October 1945	date unknown (After 30 January 1972)	student	Ação Libertadora Nacional	
	Paulo Costa Ribeiro Bastos	16 February 1945	date unknown (After 11 July 1972)	engineer	Revolutionary Movement 8th October	
	Paulo de Tarso Celestino	26 May 1944	date unknown (After 12 July 1971)	lawyer	Ação Libertadora Nacional	
	Paulo Guerra Tavares	22 August 1937	29 May 1972	dentist	Vanguarda Popular Revolucionária	
	Paulo Mendes Rodrigues	25 September 1931	25 December 1973	economist	Communist Party of Brazil	
	Paulo Roberto Pereira Marques	14 May 1949	date unknown (After 25 December 1973)	bank teller	Communist Party of Brazil	
	Paulo Stuart Wright	2 July 1933	date unknown (After 1 September 1973)	politician	Ação Popular	
	Paulo Torres Gonçalves	28 December 1949	date unknown (After 26 March 1969)	student	not listed / unknown	
	Pedro Alexandrino de Oliveira Filho	19 March 1947	date unknown (After 4 August 1974)	student	Communist Party of Brazil	
	Pedro Carretel	date unknown	date unknown (After 2 January 1974)	peasant	not listed / unknown	
	Pedro Domiense de Oliveira	14 May 1921	7 May 1964	civil servant	Brazilian Communist Party	
	Pedro Inácio de Araújo	8 June 1909	1 September 1964	cobbler	Peasant leagues	
	Pedro Jerônimo de Souza	30 June 1914	17 September 1975	merchant	Communist Party of Brazil	
	Pedro Pomar	23 September 1913	16 December 1976	politician	Communist Party of Brazil	
	Péricles Gusmão Régis	5 December 1925	12 May 1964	politician	Movimento Trabalhista Renovador	

=== R ===
Image	Name	Born	Died	Occupation	Organisation	References
	Raimundo Eduardo da Silva	23 March 1948	5 January 1971	student	Ação Popular	
	Raimundo Ferreira Lima	27 June 1937	29 May 1980	trade unionist	Comissão Pastoral da Terra	
	Raimundo Gonçalves Figueiredo	23 March 1939	date unknown (After 27 April 1971)	bank teller	Vanguarda Armada Revolucionária Palmares	
	Raimundo Nonato Paz	date unknown	2 January 1971	peasant	no organisation	
	Ramires Maranhão do Vale	21 November 1950	date unknown (After 27 October 1973)	high school student	Partido Comunista Brasileiro Revolucionário	
	Ranúsia Alves Rodrigues	18 June 1945	27 October 1973		Partido Comunista Brasileiro Revolucionário	
	Raul Amaro Nin Ferreira	2 June 1944	11 August 1971	engineer	Revolutionary Movement 8th October	
	Reinaldo Silveira Pimenta	4 March 1945	27 June 1969	student	Revolutionary Movement 8th October	
	Roberto Adolfo Val Cazorla	4 April 1954	date unknown (After 22 December 1976)	student	Montoneros	
	Roberto Cietto	12 October 1936	4 September 1969	political activist	Movimento de Ação Revolucionária	
	Roberto Macarini	15 July 1950	17 April 1970	bank teller	Vanguarda Popular Revolucionária	
	Roberto Rascardo Rodrigues	3 March 1956	date unknown (After 17 February 1977)	student	Unión de Estudiantes Secundarios	
	Rodolfo de Carvalho Troiano	2 April 1949	date unknown (Between 24 October 1973 and 1 December 1974)	student	Communist Party of Brazil	
	Ronaldo Mouth Queiroz	18 December 1947	6 April 1973	student	Ação Libertadora Nacional	
	Rosalindo Souza	2 January 1940	date unknown (Between 16 August 1973 and 1 September 1973)	lawyer	Communist Party of Brazil	
	Rubens Paiva	26 December 1929	date unknown (After 20 January 1971)	engineer	Brazilian Labour Party	
	Rui Osvaldo Aguiar Pfützenreuter	3 November 1942	15 April 1972	journalist	Partido Operário Revolucionário Trotskista	
	Ruy Carlos Vieira Berbert	16 December 1947	date unknown (After 2 January 1972)	teacher	Movimento de Libertação Popular (Brazil)	
	Ruy Frasão Soares	4 October 1941	date unknown (After 27 May 1974)	shopkeeper	Ação Popular	

=== S ===
Image	Name	Born	Died	Occupation	Organisation	References
	Sabino Alves da Silva	date unknown	17 August 1972	peasant	not listed / unknown	
	Santo Dias	22 February 1942	30 October 1979	manual worker	Pastoral Operária	
	Sebastião Gomes dos Santos	date unknown	30 May 1969	farmer	Comando de Libertação Nacional	
	Sebastião Vieira da Silva	date unknown	27 January 1972	peasant	not listed / unknown	
	Sérgio Fernando Tula Silberberg	29 March 1955	date unknown (After 8 April 1976)	teacher	not listed / unknown	
	Sérgio Landulfo Furtado	24 May 1951	date unknown (After 10 July 1972)	student	Revolutionary Movement 8th October	
	Sérgio Roberto Correa	27 July 1941	4 September 1969	student	Ação Libertadora Nacional	
	Severino Elias de Melo	20 July 1913	30 July 1965	merchant	not listed / unknown	
	Severino Viana Colou	1 January 1930	date unknown (After 24 May 1969)	police officer	Comando de Libertação Nacional	
	Sidney Fix Marques dos Santos	20 January 1940	date unknown (After 15 February 1976)	head teacher	Partido Operário Revolucionário Trotskista	
	Silvano Soares dos Santos	15 August 1929	25 June 1970	farmer	Guerrilha de Três Passos	
	Solange Lourenço Gomes	13 May 1947	1 August 1982		Partido Comunista Brasileiro Revolucionário	
	Soledad Barrett Viedma	6 January 1945	8 January 1973		Vanguarda Popular Revolucionária	
	Sônia Maria de Moraes Angel Jones	9 November 1946	30 November 1973		Ação Libertadora Nacional	
	Stuart Angel Jones	11 January 1946	date unknown (After 14 May 1971)	student	Revolutionary Movement 8th October	
	Suely Kanayama	25 May 1948	1 September 1974		Communist Party of Brazil	

=== T ===
Image	Name	Born	Died	Occupation	Organisation	References
	Telma Regina Cordeiro Corrêa	23 July 1947	1 January 1974		Communist Party of Brazil	
	Therezinha Viana de Assis	22 July 1941	3 February 1978		Ação Popular	
	Thomaz Antônio da Silva Meirelles Neto	1 July 1937	date unknown (After 7 May 1974)	journalist	Ação Libertadora Nacional	
	Tobias Pereira Júnior	26 November 1949	date unknown (After 17 December 1973)	student	Communist Party of Brazil	
	Túlio Roberto Cardoso Quintiliano	6 September 1944	date unknown (After 12 September 1973)	engineer	Partido Comunista Brasileiro Revolucionário	

=== U ===
Image	Name	Born	Died	Occupation	Organisation	References
	Uirassú de Assis Batista	5 April 1952	29 April 1974	high school student	Araguaia guerrilla	
	Umberto Albuquerque Câmara Neto	2 May 1947	date unknown (After 8 October 1973)	student	Ação Popular	

=== V ===
Image	Name	Born	Died	Occupation	Organisation	References
	Valdir Sales Saboya	1 March 1950	29 December 1972	police officer	Partido Comunista Brasileiro Revolucionário	
	Vandick Reidner Pereira Coqueiro	9 December 1949	date unknown (After 17 January 1973)	teacher	Communist Party of Brazil	
	Virgílio Gomes da Silva	15 August 1933	29 September 1969	politician	Ação Libertadora Nacional	
	Vitor Carlos Ramos	18 January 1944	date unknown (After 11 July 1974)	sculptor	Vanguarda Popular Revolucionária	
	Vítor Luíz Papandreu	date unknown	1 January 1971	military personnel	not listed / unknown	
	Vitorino Alves Moitinho	3 January 1949	date unknown (After 27 October 1973)	manual worker	Partido Comunista Brasileiro Revolucionário	
	Vladimir Herzog	27 June 1937	25 October 1975	politician	Communist Party of Brazil	

=== W ===
Image	Name	Born	Died	Occupation	Organisation	References
	Walkíria Afonso Costa	8 February 1947	date unknown (After 25 December 1973)		Communist Party of Brazil	
	Walter de Souza Ribeiro	24 September 1924	date unknown (After 3 April 1974)	journalist	Brazilian Communist Party	
	Walter Kenneth Nelson Fleury	10 October 1954	date unknown (After 9 August 1976)	mechanic	Organización Comunista Poder Obrero	
	Walter Ribeiro Novaes	1 August 1939	date unknown (After 12 July 1971)	lifeguard	Vanguarda Popular Revolucionária	
	Wânio José de Mattos	27 April 1926	16 October 1973	photographer	Vanguarda Popular Revolucionária	
	Wilson Pinheiro	1 January 1933	21 July 1980	politician	Sindicato dos Trabalhadores Rurais de Brasiléia	
	Wilson Silva	21 April 1942	date unknown (After 22 April 1974)	systems analyst	Ação Libertadora Nacional	
	Wilton Ferreira	date unknown	30 March 1972	unemployed	no organisation	

=== Y ===
Image	Name	Born	Died	Occupation	Organisation	References
	Yara Yavelberg	7 May 1944	20 August 1971		Revolutionary Movement 8th October	
	Yoshitane Fujimori	19 May 1944	5 December 1970	electroelectronics technician	Vanguarda Popular Revolucionária	

=== Z ===
Image	Name	Born	Died	Occupation	Organisation	References
	Zelmo Bosa	26 July 1937	date unknown (After 1 January 1976)	farmer	Grupos dos Onze	
	Zoé Lucas de Brito Filho	17 August 1944	28 June 1972	teacher	Ação Libertadora Nacional	
	Zuzu Angel	5 June 1921	14 April 1976		not listed / unknown	
