= Herbert Daniel =

Brazilian writer (1946–1992)

Personal details
- Born: Herbert Eustáquio de Carvalho; 14 December 1946 Belo Horizonte, Minas Gerais, Brazil
- Died: 29 March 1992 (aged 45) Rio de Janeiro, Rio de Janeiro, Brazil
- Cause of death: AIDS
- Party: PT (1980–1986); PV (1986–1992)
- Occupation: Guerrilla fighter, sociologist, journalist, writer
- Known for: Active in Vanguarda Armada Revolucionária Palmares

Herbert Eustáquio de Carvalho (December 14, 1946 – March 29, 1992), known as Herbert Daniel, was a Brazilian writer, sociologist, journalist, and guerrilla, involved in the armed resistance to the military dictatorship that held power in Brazil from 1964 to 1985.

== Life ==
Herbert Daniel was born Herbert Eustáquio de Carvalho in 1946 in Belo Horizonte, Brazil. He studied medicine at the Federal University of Minas Gerais but did not graduate. Adopting the clandestine nom-de-guerre Daniel, he fought as a guerrilla against the Brazilian government during the years of the military dictatorship, joining the paramilitary organizations Organização Revolucionária Marxista Política Operária (POLOP), Comando de Libertação Nacional (COLINA), Vanguarda Armada Revolucionária Palmares, and Vanguarda Popular Revolucionária (VPR). According to his fellow fighter Alfredo Sirkis, Daniel was for a period the intellectual leader of the Guevarist VPR. As a member of that organization, Daniel participated in the kidnappings of the German ambassador Ehrenfried von Holleben, in June 1970, and the Swiss ambassador Giovanni Bucher, in December 1970. Carlos Lamarca, who also participated in the Swiss ambassador's kidnapping, joined forces with him to found the guerrilla force in Vale do Ribeira in 1969.

Daniel was one of the few participants in the armed resistance to avoid prison and torture at the hands of the regime. He self-exiled in 1974, moving to live with his partner in Portugal, where he returned to studying medicine, and in France, where he worked as a journalist. He was the very last exile of the military regime to be pardoned. He returned to Brazil in 1981, after the country began its redemocratization process. Daniel became active in the Workers' Party, then participated in the founding of the Brazilian Green Party alongside other Workers' Party dissidents.

He was a lifelong activist for environmentalism and for gay rights—he himself had a 20-year relationship with the graphic artist Cláudio Mesquita.

Daniel wrote several books, including Passagem para o Próximo Sonho, Meu Corpo Daria um Romance, and Vida antes da Morte.

He died in 1992, in Rio de Janeiro, of complications caused by AIDS.

The Green Party's policy arm is named Fundação Verde Herbert Daniel in his honor.

== Bibliography ==
- Green, James N. (2018). Exile Within Exiles: Herbert Daniel, Gay Brazilian Revolutionary. Durham: Duke University Press. 334 pages. ISBN 978-1-4780-0086-0
