= James Allen da Luz =

Brazilian guerrilla member (1938–1973)

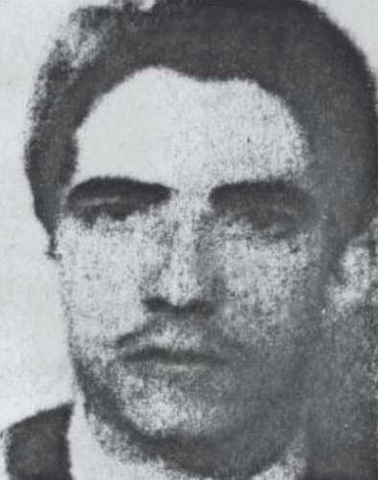
- Born: 21 December 1938; Buriti Alegre, Goiás, Brazil
- Disappeared: 24 March 1973 (aged 34) or 16 November 1977 (aged 38); Porto Alegre, Rio Grande do Sul, Brazil
- Status: Declared presumed dead
- Other names: Ciro; Roberto; Goiano
- Occupation: Student
- Known for: Cruzeiro do Sul Flight 114 hijacking
- Movement: VAR-Palmares

James Allen da Luz (21 December 1938 – disappeared 24 March 1973 or 16 November 1977) was a Brazilian guerrilla and member of the far-left organization Palmares Armed Revolutionary Vanguard (VAR-Palmares), a group that participated in armed resistance against the military dictatorship in Brazil between 1964 and 1985.

His death date is unknown and his remains were never delivered to his family.

== Life ==
He was the son of Cassiano Diniz Filho da Luz and Rolandina Martins da Luz.

One of the main militants of VAR-Palmares and a member of the Red Wing (the most radical subgroup of the organisation), Allen participated in many armed actions led by the guerrillas in that period. He went into exile in Uruguay and Cuba, but he returned to Brazil many times to take part in new acts against the military government. He is most known for being the leader of the Cruzeiro do Sul Flight 114 hijacking to Cuba in January 1970. He was also known for being the sole survivor of the Quintino Massacre, which occurred in Rio de Janeiro in March 1972, during which his pregnant partner, Lígia Maria Salgado Nóbrega, was killed by government agents along with other members of the guerrillas.

== Disappearance ==
Allen's final fate is not officially known and is considered an enforced disappearance, with reliable information contradictory or hidden. The only consensus is about the death place, the city of Porto Alegre.

The Eremias Delizoicov Documentation Center states that his disappearance occurred on 16 November 1977. However, another version holds that Allen died in a car crash on 24 March 1973, four years before his official disappearance, according to a National Information Service classified report discovered after redemocratization. Volume III of the National Truth Commission report determined the state was responsible for hiding Allen's body, while adding that he suffered many violations at the hands of state agents of the military dictatorship. His body has never been found and the Armed Forces have no registry for the case.

== Car accident ==
According to documents published by the state's repression agencies, Allen died in a car crash in Porto Alegre on 24 March 1973. An autopsy along with his death date were presented by the authorities on the following day. The document was signed by coroners Edson M. Dutra and Marco Aurélio Barros da Silva and registered under the name of James Allen. The forensics expert also stated that the accident occurred on 24 March and that Allen was taken in serious condition to Clínica Stefani, in the same city.

In an article published 11 days later, on 5 April 1973, the newspaper Folha da Tarde reported that the police were stumped by the rollover of a Volkswagen Variant in Estrada do Lami, which caused the death of a man. Additionally, it was reported that the Department of Political and Social Order (DOPS) was assisting the police in the case, investigating the possible involvement of a political militant in the accident.

According to statements given to the Special Commission about Political Deaths and Disappearances (CEMDP) by people who were with Allen during the accident, he did not die during the event and was instead taken to a hospital, where he was under police supervision. There is no further information about Allen or Allen's body after he was admitted to the hospital. Some doctors' testimonies state that he would have arrived dead at the medical station and that his body would have been taken to the morgue.

== Newspapers ==
On 6 April 1972, an article published by O Globo reported that Allen was killed in a shootout with security forces. However, at the end of the same year, on 22 November 1972, an unknown military officer reported that Allen was still alive and at large. The inquiry that investigates the Front's actions includes Allen's name in the report.

== See also ==
- List of people killed by and disappeared during the Brazilian military dictatorship
- List of people who disappeared
