= Serviços Aéreos Cruzeiro do Sul Flight 114 =

1970 aircraft hijacking

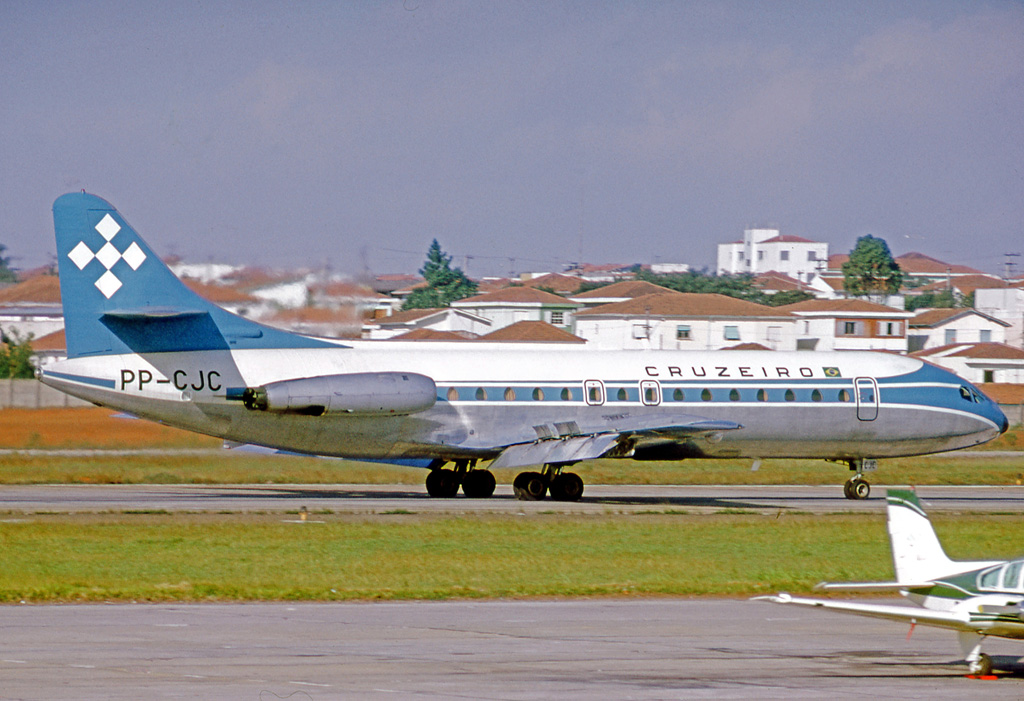
- An identical Serviços Aéreos Cruzeiro do Sul Sud Aviation Caravelle

Hijacking
- Date: 1 January 1970
- Summary: Mid-air hijacking

Aircraft
- Aircraft type: Sud Aviation Caravelle SE 210
- Operator: Serviços Aéreos Cruzeiro do Sul
- Registration: PP-PDZ
- Flight origin: Carrasco International Airport, Montevideo, Uruguay
- 1st stopover: Ezeiza International Airport, Buenos Aires, Argentina
- 2nd stopover: Andrés Sabella Gálvez International Airport, Antofagasta, Chile
- 3rd stopover: Jorge Chávez International Airport, Lima, Peru
- Last stopover: Tocumen International Airport, Panama City, Panama
- Destination: José Martí International Airport, Havana, Cuba
- Occupants: 28 (including 6 hijackers)
- Passengers: 21 (including 6 hijackers)
- Crew: 7
- Survivors: 28

Serviços Aéreos Cruzeiro do Sul Flight 114 was a domestic passenger flight hijacked by five members of VAR-Palmares, a guerrilla group against the Brazilian military dictatorship, on 1 January 1970. The hijacking began in Montevideo, Uruguay, in a plane operated by Serviços Aéreos Cruzeiro do Sul, which would fly from Carrasco International Airport in Montevideo to Rio de Janeiro/Galeão International Airport in Rio de Janeiro, but it was detoured to Havana. It was the longest hijacking occurred during the military period in Brazil.

== Hijacking ==
The hijacking was planned by the coordinator of VAR-Palmares in Rio Grande do Sul, Cláudio Galeno Linhares, to obligate the military government to announce the whereabouts of two militants of the organization, Fausto Machado Freire and Marco Antonio Meyer, secretly arrested in Rio de Janeiro for their involvement in robberies. The action also aimed to protect Marília Guimarães Freire, Fausto's wife, and their two toddlers. Marília, also member of the guerrilla, at age 24 was the owner of a school in Coelho Neto, Rio de Janeiro and used the mimeographs of the school to print flyers for VAR-Palmares. With the arrest of her husband, she was at risk. Hiding and wanted, the decision of the organization was to send her to Cuba with her children. Marília, who was hidden in Minas Gerais, travelled by bus to Porto Alegre with her kids and met with a group formed by Galeno, Athos Magno Costa e Silva, Nestor Herédia, VAR German guerrilla member Isolde Sommer and James Allen da Luz, an exiled militant for 4 years in Uruguay and member of the Red Wing (Ala Vermelha), the most radical group of the organization, who would command the hijacking.

At 19:32 (GMT-3) on 1 January 1970, the group boarded a Sud Aviation Caravelle, registration code PP-PDZ, of Serviços Aéreos Cruzeiro do Sul, heading to Rio de Janeiro/Galeão International Airport, with stopovers in Porto Alegre and São Paulo. Right after takeoff, James Allen stood up with pistol in hand, ran towards the cockpit and announced the hijacking. The plane was first detoured to Buenos Aires, where two elderly passengers were allowed to disembark, leaving their daughter on board. After refueling, with the hijacking already announced in the media of Brazil and the world and the demand that the Brazilian government reveal the whereabouts of the two guerrilla members arrested given to Argentine authorities, they flew to Antofagasta, Chile, for another refueling, and then to Lima, Peru. In Lima, the plane had to be withheld for more than one day, with everyone on board, due to a battery fault. During this time, James Allen gave an interview through the plane window, surrounded by journalists and Peruvian soldiers with machine guns, talking about their demands and warning that the group was armed with pistols, daggers and hand grenades - which was a lie, they only had revolvers, as Galeno stated years later. As he predicted, the hijacking made the military government acknowledge the captivity of Meyer and Frere. In the plane, a passenger, Flávio Macedo Soares, secretary of the Brazilian Ministry of Foreign Affairs who tried to destroy classified documents from a diplomatic case throwing them in the toilet, surrendered, and the documents were confiscated and given to the Cuban government, who would later give back to Brazil.

The plane was withheld for 27 hours in Lima, due to a problem in the battery that caused an electric failure in the right engine and after Peruvian president Velasco Alvarado ordered the security forces to negotiate a surrender until exhaustion of the hijackers. With the hijacking in the worldwide press, the plane was surrounded by police officers, journalists, photographers and a crowd of onlookers, and photos of the guerrilla members in the cockpit window were sent via telex all around the world. Political asylum for Marília and the children in exchange for the hostages was offered and refused. With the battery changed for a new one from Chile, the failure in negotiation and the hijackers threatening to kill the hostages, during the late night of 3 January the Peruvian government authorized the takeoff of the plane, which flew to Panama.

After arriving at Panama City, on the morning of 3 January, under strong hold of Washington, D.C., at the time full of American militaries who controlled the region of Panama Canal, the environment was hostile to both crew and hijackers. Marines were spotted hidden behind trees aiming at the cockpit with sniper rifles. Disembarking to acquire gas fuel for the plane, Second Officer Hélio Borges was intercepted by Brazilian officers in the country, who demanded that he return to the plane with a gun in hand provided by them and shoot, followed by the military, but he refused, fearing for his and the passengers' lives. Offers to send poisoned food to the plane or put tear gas in the air ducts were also refused, even under threats. The refusals caused him many problems when he returned to Brazil, where he was accused of being an accomplice of the guerrillas and lost his job. Five hours later, the plane took off for the final destination, Havana.

2 hours and 15 minutes later, with a red light flashing non-stop in the cockpit indicating lack of lubrication in the turbines, the Caravelle landed at José Martí International Airport, and guerrilla members, passengers, and crew were received by Cuban militaries. The hijacking ended after 47 hours.

== Aftermath ==
The Cuban reception of the Fight 114 crew was the coldest possible, questioning them about their political positions, photographing them and taking their fingerprints in the hotel they were hosted. Accused of landing in the country without authorization, they were warned that the aircraft couldn't return to Brazil without paying the airports tax, an amount of dozens of thousands of dollars. As Brazil had no diplomatic relations with Cuba, the Brazilian government had to request the Swiss government to mediate the payment, so passengers and crew could return. The return landing to Rio de Janeiro only happened on 7 January, after stopovers in Puerto Rico, where they were questioned by the FBI, Manaus and Brasília. In Rio, all passengers and crew were questioned in the airport and prohibited to give any statement about anything that happened on board.

Second Officer Hélio Borges suffered many problems after his return, losing his job. Flight attendant José Omar da Silveira Morais, who also disembarked from the plane in Panama and was threatened by Brazilian officers and diplomats for refusing to participate in a plan of invasion of the plane, was fired from civil aviation in 1972 and couldn't get any job in this area, contracted oligophrenia and, in 2012, still fought in Court for a reparation, living his sister's house in Barbacena, Minas Gerais. In August 2016, he had his condition of political persecuted recognized by the Brazilian government and received a reparation of R$400,000 (US$ 114,570.5) and a monthly pension of R$3,200 (US$ 916.56).

Cláudio Galeno, leader of the hijacking and first spouse of former president Dilma Rousseff, whom he was already separated for 2 years at the time, stayed for a few months in Cuba and then went to Chile, where he met and married Nicaraguan Mayra, a Sandinista guerrilla, banished to Santiago by the dictatorship of Anastasio Somoza Debayle. They had a daughter, but had to leave the country in 1973 due to general Pinochet coup d'état. Galeno lived in Belgium, Italy and France and returned to Brazil in 1979 with the Amnesty, where he worked for a few years as advisor of Leonel Brizola when he was elected governor of Rio de Janeiro. Today, he lives in Managua with his wife and two daughters.

Marília Guimarães lived in Cuba with her children for 10 years, where she studied medicine, until the Amnesty. When she returned to Brazil, Marília wrote the book "Nesta terra, neste instante", telling her adventures, worked with culture and, in the 2000s, she filed for a reparation to the Amnesty Commission, refused for the lack of supporting documents. She married again and began working as entrepreneur of the computing area, having as one of her largest clients the Brazilian Armed Forces, and has a house in Barra da Tijuca - where she still keeps photographs of Fidel Castro and Che Guevara - and another one in Miami.

Isolde Sommer, who drew attention from crew and international press for her beauty, married another guerrilla, Reinaldo José de Melo, lived in Mozambique before returning from exile and received a reparation from the Amnesty Commission, along with Athos Magno and Nestor Herédia.

Fausto Machado Freire, a former advisor of minister Jarbas Passarinho before going underground, and Marco Antonio Meyer, the two guerrilla arrested who had their lives guaranteed by the hijacking, were banned from the country with other 38 guerrilla in June 1970, in exchange for the release of German Ambassador Ehrenfried von Holleben.

James Allen da Luz, part of VAR-Palmares frontline, returned to Brazil after a guerrilla training in Cuba and was involved in other armed operations, being the sole survivor of Quintino Massacre, occurred in Rio de Janeiro in March 1972, where a group of VAR-Palmares guerrillas was executed by the security forces of the regime. He disappeared in Porto Alegre, probably in March 1973 and is still a political missing.
