= Coronel Macedo =

Municipality in the state of São Paulo in Brazil

- Municipality
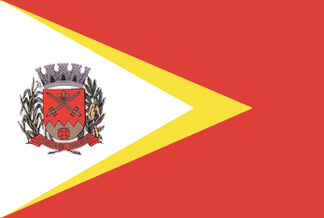
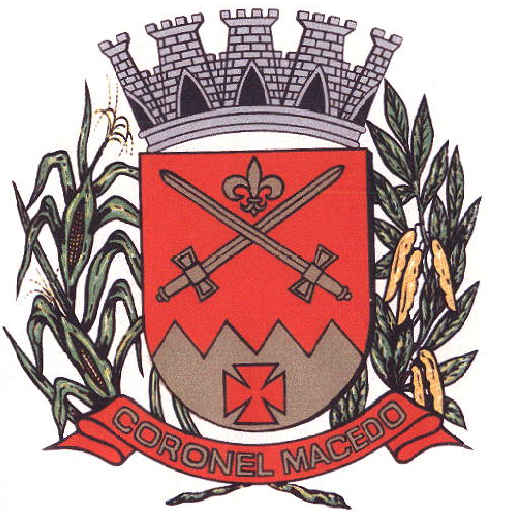
- Flag Coat of arms

- Location in São Paulo state

- Location in Brazil
- Coordinates: 23°37′52″S 49°18′49″W
- Country: Brazil
- Region: Southeast
- State: São Paulo

Area
  - Total: 304 km^{2} (117 sq mi)

Population (2020)
  - Total: 4,635
  - Density: 15.2/km^{2} (39.5/sq mi)
- Time zone: UTC−3 (BRT)

Coronel Macedo is a municipality in the state of São Paulo in Brazil. The population is 4,635 (2020 est.) in an area of 304 km^{2}. The elevation is 624 m.

== Media ==
In telecommunications, the city was served by Companhia de Telecomunicações do Estado de São Paulo until 1973, when it began to be served by Telecomunicações de São Paulo. In July 1998, this company was acquired by Telefónica, which adopted the Vivo brand in 2012.

The company is currently an operator of cell phones, fixed lines, internet (fiber optics/4G) and television (satellite and cable).

== Notable residents ==
- Suely Kanayama (1948–1974), guerrilla.

== See also ==
- List of municipalities in São Paulo
