= Suely Kanayama =

Brazilian guerrilla (1948–1974)

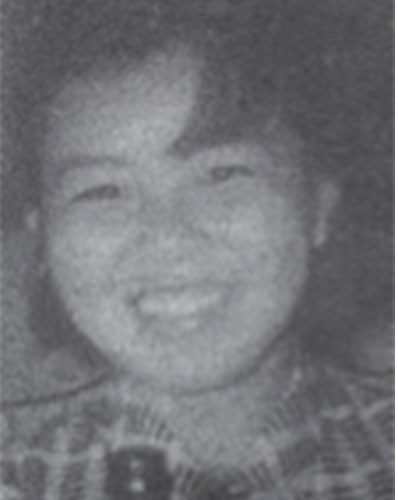
- Born: 25 May 1948; Coronel Macedo, São Paulo, Brazil
- Died: September 1974 (aged 26); Pará, Brazil
- Education: University of São Paulo
- Occupation: Member of the Araguaia guerrilla
- Years active: 1971–1974
- Political party: Communist Party of Brazil

Suely Yumiko Kanayama (25 May 1948 – September 1974), also known by the codename Chica, was a Brazilian activist and a member of the armed resistance against the Brazilian military dictatorship. She was part of the Araguaia guerrilla and contributed to attempts to start an armed rebellion in the Amazon. Kanayama disappeared in 1974, and she is considered a disappeared person by the National Truth Commission.

== Early life and education ==
Kanayama was born on 25 May 1948 in Coronel Macedo, São Paulo, the first child of Yutaka Kanayama and Emi Noguchi, Japanese citizens who had immigrated to Brazil. At the age of four, Kanayama moved with her family to Avaré, where she started her education. In 1965, the family moved to the Santo Amaro district of São Paulo, where Kanayama completed her education, graduating in 1967.

Kanayama passed the entrance exam for the University of São Paulo, where she studied Portuguese and Germanic languages. She also completed an elective course in Japanese between 1967 and 1969. While at university, she became friends with Rioko Kayano, and together they joined Ação Popular, a left-wing political organisation. Later, Nair Kobashi, another Japanese Brazilian, invited them to become members of the Communist Party of Brazil. Kanayama was elected as one of its student leaders in 1967. She graduated in 1970.

== Activism ==
In 1971, Kanayama travelled to Araguaia, a region of the state of Pará, where she became a member of the Araguaia guerrilla's Detachment B, which was commanded by Osvaldão; she received the codename Chica and was trained in weaponry and jungle survival. Kanayama worked as a medical assistant under João Carlos Haas Sobrinho. In December 1973, after the guerrilla became subjected to heavy attacks from the Brazilian military, Kanayama and fellow guerrilla José Maurílio Patrício left detachment B to search for two missing associates, José Lima Piauhy Dourado and Cilon Cunha Brum, who were lost in the jungle. The mission was due to take three days.

== Death ==
Kanayama was not seen again after leaving to search for her associates with Patrício in December 1973. While her body had not been located as of 2025, the most common narrative about her disappearance stated that she was killed in September 1974, nine months after she was last seen, when she was surrounded by an army patrol; it is alleged that she refused to surrender and shot and injured a soldier before being killed. A separate account, given by a soldier, stated that Kanayama was wounded during the encounter, and was subsequently detained and tortured before being executed by lethal injection at a military base in Bacaba. The Navy Ministry wrote a report in 1993 that stated that Kanayama had died in September 1974, without specifying the circumstances of her death.

In 1979, the newspaper Diário Nippak reported that Kanayama had been shot and killed by soldiers and buried in Xambioá, before her body was later exhumed.

Pedro Cabral, a former colonel in the Brazilian Air Force, stated in 1993 that a guerrilla's body had been buried at the Bacaba base following her death, before being exhumed in 1975 and transported by helicopter to the Serra das Andorinhas, a mountain range in Pará, where it was cremated and disposed of.

In 2013, army sergeant João Santa Cruz Sacramento stated before the Truth Commission that a "Japanese woman", later identified as Kanayama, had been captured alongside another female guerrilla on the banks of the Araguaia river and taken to Bacaba in São Geraldo, where they were tortured and executed by lethal injection before being buried by an abandoned air strip.

The Truth Commission identifies Kanayama as disappeared due to her remains having never been found.

== Recognition ==
Streets have been named after Kanayama in the Campo Grande neighbourhood of Rio de Janeiro, as well as Campinas, São Paulo.

In 2024, Kanayama posthumously received her diploma from the University of São Paulo, alongside other students killed during the military dictatorship. Her diploma was accepted by her friend and fellow Japanese Brazilian activist Nair Kobashi.
