= Abelardo Rausch de Alcântara =

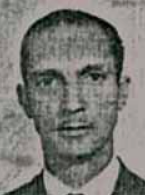
- An undated photo of Rausch de Alcântara
- Born: 5 August 1927; Teófilo Otoni
- Died: 13 February 1970 (aged 42); Brasília
- Cause of death: Deceased as a result of torture inflicted by agents of the Brazilian State
- Spouse: Elza Souza de Alcântara

Abelardo Rausch de Alcântara (5 August 1927 – 13 February 1970) died under mysterious circumstances in 1970 while under military police custody in Brazil. Authorities initially claimed that Abelard, a bank employee questioned over a recent robbery, committed suicide during interrogation by slitting his wrists with broken glass and drinking disinfectant. They asserted that he died from injuries after the ambulances transporting him crashed into a government vehicle near the Buriti Palace.

The official narrative is not supported by evidence. Abelardo was taken from his home on February 13, 1970, by three unidentified men claiming to be bank officials. The next morning, a stranger collected work clothes from Abelardo's wife, Elza.

Hours later, Elza was informed her husband was deceased. When she found his body at the cemetery chapel, he was wearing the clothes she had handed over hours before. His body bore heavy bruising, burns, and a broken arm.

To add, the official accident report for the ambulance crash never listed Abelardo as a passenger or casualty. A contemporary newspaper also exposed than an independent medical review found severe trauma ignored by the state's medical autopsy. The driver of the vehicle struck by the ambulance later testified that he military's driver rammed into him on purpose. He was acquitted, and the judge declared that he was being accused of the death of a deceased person.
