= José Jobim =

Brazilian diplomat (1909–1979)

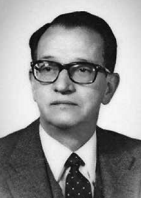
- Born: José Pinheiro Jobim; 2 August 1909; São Paulo, São Paulo, Brazil
- Died: 24 March 1979 (aged 69); Barra da Tijuca, Rio de Janeiro, Brazil
- Occupations: Diplomat, economist
- Children: Lygia Collor Jobim

José Pinheiro Jobim (2 August 1909 – 24 March 1979) was a Brazilian diplomat and economist.

== Career ==
In 1944 he was Vice Consul in Washington, D.C. He was then employed by João Alberto Lins de Barros's Rubber Army company, which raised the Brazilian production of natural rubber for sale during the war.

From 4 July 1955 to 1 November 1957, he was an extraordinary envoy and plenipotentiary minister in Helsinki. From 1957 to 1959, he was the ambassador of Asunción. From 19 December 1959 to 26 March 1962, he was ambassador in Quito. From 18 January 1965 to 9 September 1966 he was Ambassador in Bogotá. From 16 November 1966 to 17 October 1968 he was Ambassador in Algiers. From 19 October 1968 to 20 April 1973, he was Ambassador to the Holy See.

== Personal life ==
José Jobim was the son of Francisco Antenor Jobim and Joaquina Pinheiro Jobim. He had an older brother, Danton, who assumed the presidency of the Brazilian newspaper Última Hora, which opposed the military dictatorship in Brazil, when its creator, Samuel Wainer, was exiled by the dictatorship, and in 1970 he was elected senator for the Brazilian Democratic Movement, an opposition party to the regime; Danton died in 1978.

Jobim was married to a sister of Leda Collor, mother of Fernando Collor de Mello. They had a daughter, Lygia Collor Jobim, who was also a diplomat.

== Death ==
On 15 March 1979, Jobim attended the inauguration of João Figueiredo as President of Brazil. During his stay, he mentioned that he was writing a memoir in which he would detail irregularities in the work of the Itaipu Dam, including an overbilling of ten times the original value. Jobim was Brazil's ambassador to Paraguay from 1957 to 1959. At the beginning of negotiations on the creation of the dam, he was sent by President João Goulart in February 1964 (just before the 1964 coup d'état in Brazil), to a mission with Paraguayan ministers to discuss the issue, and in 1966, while he was ambassador of Brazil in Colombia, he participated in the signing of the Ata das Cataratas ("Falls Act"), the initial document of the construction of Itaipu, as a consultant.

On 22 March, Jobim went to visit a friend and did not return. The next morning, the owner of a pharmacy in Barra da Tijuca called Jobim's family and reported that Jobim had given her a note half an hour earlier. Jobim claimed that he had been abducted in his own car and that he would be taken to "just after the Joatinga Bridge." Jobim's body was found on the morning of 24 March, less than a kilometer from the bridge, hung by the neck with a nylon rope by the branch of a tree. However, his feet touched the ground and his legs were bent, raising suspicion about the hypothesis of suicide that the authorities claimed.

On 21 September 2018, the Brazilian government issued a new death certificate for Jobim, as a result of the work of the Special Commission on the Dead and Disappeared Politicians and the National Truth Commission of Brazil, which in its final report in December 2014, recommended that the country rectify the cause of death of people who died as a result of human rights violations, including forced disappearances. The new certificate, which gives 24 March 1979 as his date of death, acknowledges that Jobim was kidnapped, tortured, and murdered, giving his cause of death as "unnatural, violent death, caused by the Brazilian State, in the context of the systematic and widespread persecution of the population identified as political opponents to the dictatorial regime from 1964 to 1985".

== Publications ==
- History of Industries in Brazil, Rio de Janeiro, 1940.
- Brazil in the Making, Macmillan Company, New York, 1943.
