= Helenira Resende =

Brazilian guerrilla (1944–1972)

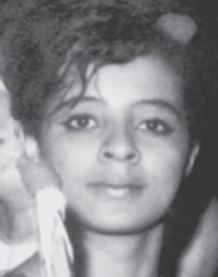
- Born: 19 January 1944; Cerqueira César, São Paulo, Brazil
- Died: 29 September 1972 (aged 28); Oito Barracas, Pará, Brazil
- Cause of death: Gunshots and stab wounds
- Education: University of São Paulo
- Years active: 1967–1972
- Organization: Araguaia guerrilla
- Political party: Communist Party of Brazil

Helenira Resende de Souza Nazareth (19 January 1944 – 29 September 1972), also known by the code name Fátima and the nickname Preta, was a Brazilian activist and member of the armed resistance against the Brazilian military dictatorship. A member of the Communist Party of Brazil and the Araguaia guerrilla, she is officially considered a disappeared person due to her remains not being located, though it is widely accepted that she was killed by soldiers from the Brazilian Armed Forces in 1972.

== Early life and education ==
Resende was born on 19 January 1944 in Cerqueira César, a municipality in São Paulo, to Adalberto de Assis Nazareth and Euthália Resende de Souza Nazareth. At the age of four, the family moved to Assis, where Resende grew up. She attended the Instituto de Educação de Assis, where she was a co-founder of its student representative council, and played on its basketball team, as well as competing in the long jump.

Resende studied literature and philosophy at the University of São Paulo, where she was elected vice president of the National Union of Students (UNE). She became known by the nickname Preta (lit. 'Black'). In 1967, Resende was arrested for the first time after she spraypainted "abaixo as leis da ditadura" (lit. 'down with the dictatorship') on the walls of Mackenzie University. She was arrested for a second time during a protest in São Paulo in March 1968.

Later in 1968, Resende was among 800 students arrested during a UNE conference in Ibiúna. While being transported by authorities by bus alongside other detainees, she was able to pass a note to a passerby alerting her family in Cambuci of her arrest. After initially being detained at Tiradentes Prison, Resende was transferred to the custody of the Department of Political and Social Order, where she was sentenced to death by its chief, Sérgio Paranhos Fleury. Resende was subsequently released from Carandiru Penitentiary in December 1968 after her family successfully requested a habeas corpus granted shortly before the passing of Institutional Act Number Five. Following her release, Resende went underground, initially in São Paulo, and later moved to southeastern Pará to support the rural resistance against the military dictatorship.

== Activism ==
In Pará, the Araguaia guerrilla had been established by the Communist Party of Brazil with the goal of overthrowing the military dictatorship through a peasant revolution, inspired by revolutions in Cuba and China that had relied heavily on support from rural areas. The party decided that the countryside of southeastern Pará along the banks of the Araguaia River was a strategic location to start an uprising, due to its isolated location and lack of accessibility, as well as a deprived local population that it was felt would be more easily agitated to revolt. Resende was sent to Pará shortly after officially joining the Communist Party. Under the code name Fátima, she joined the guerrilla's first detachment, Detachment A, which worked to organise an armed struggle in the area.

== Death ==
On 29 September 1972, Resende was among a group of guerrillas ambushed by Brazilian soldiers. The group, who had been on guard in a wooded area, were found by scouts from the Brazilian Armed Forces. Resende shot and killed one of the soldiers before shot in the leg by another soldier, whom she shot in return. Resende was captured by the soldiers and, after refusing to provide the locations of guerrillas in the area, was tortured to death with a bayonet. She was 28 at the time of her death.

An account of Resende's death was provided by local communist leader Ângelo Arroyo after his release in 1974, who was the only member of the group not to be killed in the ambush. Local residents reported that Resende's body had been buried in a location known as Oito Barracas, though her grave remains undiscovered; as a result, Resende continued to be officially considered a fugitive by the Armed Forces as of 1993. In 2007, Resende's name was found among a list of 16 other people in archives of dictatorship materials, under the heading "falecidos" (lit. 'deceased'). In 2014, the National Truth Commission requested that Resende be officially recognised as deceased with her cause of death named in accordance to the account given by Arroyo and others; Brazilian authorities have not officially accepted culpability for Resende's disappearance or death.

Following Resende's death, her detachment was renamed in her honour.

== Recognition ==
Many buildings and establishments in Resende's home state of São Paulo have been named or renamed in her honour.

In Mauá, a women's centre established by the Olga Benário Women's Movement is named Casa Helenira Preta, after Resende.

In 1997, the municipal government of Campinas passed legislation renaming a street after Resende; the municipality of Guarulhos also has a street named in Resende's honour. In the city of São Paulo, there are streets named after Resende in Grajaú and Cidade Ademar.

In 2012, the Postgraduate Association of the University of São Paulo renamed itself to the APG Helenira "Preta" Resende; the social sciences centre of the Federal University of São Paulo also bears her name. In 2014, the city of Assis renamed a public space and cultural centre after Resende.

In 2024, Resende was among fifteen former students of the University of São Paulo's Faculty of Philosophy, Languages and Human Sciences who had been murdered during the dictatorship to posthumously receive their graduation diplomas, as part of the university's "Diplomação da Resistência" project.
