= Marx, Mao, Marighella, and Guevara =

Urban guerilla group in Brazil (1969–1970)

- Founding leader: Edmur Péricles de Camargo
- Dates active: 1969–1970
- Ideology: Communism; Marxism-Leninism; Maoism; Guevarism; Marighellism
- Political position: Far-left

Marx, Mao, Marighella, and Guevara (M3G) was an urban guerilla group active during the Brazilian military dictatorship. The group was active in Porto Alegre in 1969 and 1970, and founded by Edmur Péricles de Camargo, a former associate of Carlos Marighella.
