= Comando de Libertação Nacional =

Political organization in Brazil

National Liberation Command
- Comando de Libertação Nacional
- Dates active: 1967–1969
- Merged into: VAR Palmares
- Country: Brazil
- Ideology: Anti-imperialism; Anti-globalization; Anti-neoliberalism
- Political position: Far-left

The Comando de Libertação Nacional (Colina, English: National Liberation Command) was a far-left political organization in Brazil. It originated on 1967 in the state of Minas Gerais, through the merger of Worker's Politics (Portuguese: Política Operária - Polop), an organization founded in 1961 as a faction of the Brazilian Socialist Party, with some leftist militants. Colina embraced the ideas advocated by OSPAAAL, starting armed actions in 1968 to fund rural guerrilla warfare against the military dictatorship installed after the United States government-sponsored 1964 coup d'état.

Colina became known for its clumsy attempt to "make justice" against Bolivian Captain Gary Prado, billed as the officer who had captured and executed Che Guevara in Bolivia. On June 1, 1968, João Lucas Alves, Severino Viana, José Roberto Monteiro, and Amílcar Baiardi shot and killed an officer in the neighborhood of Gávea, Rio de Janeiro, believing he was the Bolivian officer, when in fact it was Edward Ernest Tito Otto Maximilian von Westernhagen, a Wehrmacht major. Given the misunderstanding, Colina refused to take responsibility for the attack. Baiardi, the only of the four militants who survived the dictatorship, revealed Colina's involvement in the attack on 1988.

In November 1968, João Lucas was arrested and tortured to death. Three months later, it was Severino that got captured. He was found dead in his cell under the allegation of "suicide". Such murder practice was common in the period, as the death of journalist Vladimir Herzog would later reveal.

In January 1969, the Civil Police of Minas Gerais undertook a search in the organization's "unit", engaging in a heavy firefight with militants, which resulted in the death of two police officers. Soon after, the group would be dismantled with the arrest of its leaders. One of them, Murilo Pezzuti, was sent to Rio de Janeiro, where he served as a guinea pig for torture classes in the Military Village.

The most famous member of Colina was Dilma Rousseff, the former President of Brazil, who had joined the group in her youth. Contrary to the rumors, Rousseff claims she never shot at any officials or military personnel during her time with Colina.

On 1969, when several of Colina militants were jailed, it became VAR Palmares after the merger with former members of VPR.

== See also ==
- Socialism
- Brazilian military government
- Vanguarda Armada Revolucionária Palmares
