= Vanguarda Armada Revolucionária Palmares =

Far left guerrilla organization in Brazil

Palmares Armed Revolutionary Vanguard
- Vanguarda Armada Revolucionária Palmares
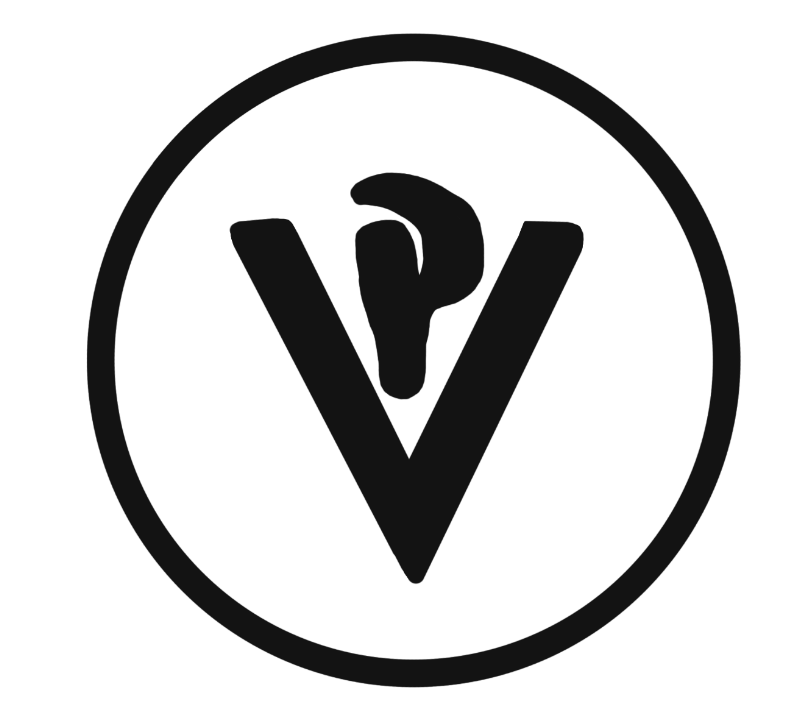
- Dates active: 1969–1972
- Merger of: Comando de Libertação Nacional; Vanguarda Popular Revolucionária
- Country: Brazil
- Ideology: Marxism–Leninism
- Political position: Far-left
- Status: Extinct

The Vanguarda Armada Revolucionária Palmares (VAR Palmares, English: Palmares Armed Revolutionary Vanguard) was a far left guerrilla organization in Brazil, which fought against the military dictatorship installed after the 1964 coup d'état in the country with the objective to implant a communist dictatorship. The organization was named after Palmares, a legendary quilombo destroyed by Portuguese artillery in 1694.

== History ==
The organization was created in July 1969, as a result of the merger between Comando de Libertação Nacional (Colina) and Vanguarda Popular Revolucionária (VPR, English: Popular Revolutionary Vanguard), led by anti-dictatorship Army Captain Carlos Lamarca.

As historian and former MR-8 militant Daniel Aarão Reis Filho declared to journalist Elio Gaspari, "as part of the radicalization process initiated on 1961, the project of the leftist organizations that supported the armed struggle was revolutionary, abusive and dictatorial (...) There is not even one document of those organizations in which they present themselves as a tool of democratic resistance".

The organization carried out acts of robbery, theft and terrorist bombing. The best known of them is the expropriation of the mythical "Adhemar de Barros' safe box", which contained over 2.8 million dollars in cash, equivalent to 16.2 million dollars in 2007. The safe was in the residence of Anna Gimel Benchimol Capriglione, secretary and mistress of the former governor of São Paulo, who was popularly known by his supporters' catchphrase "he steals but he gets things done". The militants assumed that the money kept in the safe would be the product of corruption. Carlos Minc was one of the members of VAR Palmares which participated in the robbery. Dilma Rousseff was also a member, but she claims not to have taken part in the group's most famous transgression. While some versions state that Dilma organized the whole operation, Minc and other members of the group assure that she had no major role in the VAR Palmares.

In September 1969, one of its splinter groups recreated the VPR and another faction created the DVP, later renamed Unit Group. Also in 1969, VAR Palmares members planned the kidnapping of Finance Minister Antônio Delfim Netto, planner of the "Brazilian economic miracle" and the most powerful civilian in the regime at that time. The alleged kidnapping was to occur in December of that year, but was not accomplished because most VAR Palmares members were captured and jailed just weeks before.

VAR Palmares was dismantled in 1971 due to strong repression from the military. Two of its main leaders were imprisoned and murdered by the regime: Carlos Alberto Soares de Freitas, one of Colina's founders, and Joaquim da Mariano Silva, a veteran member of the Peasant Leagues, who "disappeared" in the DOI-CODI jail in Rio de Janeiro.

On February 5, 1972, militants from VAR-Palmares, ALN, and the Revolutionary Brazilian Communist Party (PCBR) shot and killed British sailor David Cuthberg, who was in the country with a British Navy task force for the celebrations of Brazil's 150th anniversary of independence. After the attack, pamphlets were thrown into the taxi where he was, stating that the act had been decided by a "tribunal," as a form of solidarity with the Irish Republican Army struggle against British rule. Almost two months later, three members of the organization, Lígia Maria Salgado Nóbrega – who participated in Cuthberg's execution – Maria Regina Lobo Leite Figueiredo, and Antônio Marcos Pinto de Oliveira were killed in Rio de Janeiro in what became known as the Quintino Massacre.
