= List of Brazilian films of 2006 =

A list of films produced in Brazil in 2006 (see 2006 in film):

== 2006 ==
Title	Director	Cast	Genre	Notes
1972	José Emílio Rondeau	Dandara Guerra, Rafael Rocha	Musical	
A Concepção	José Eduardo Belmonte	Matheus Nachtergaele, Milhem Cortaz, Rosanne Mulholland, Juliano Cazarré	Drama	
Acredite, um Espírito Baixou em Mim	Jorge Moreno	Ílvio Amaral, Maurício Canguçu	Comedy	
Anjos do Sol	Rudi Lagemann	Fernanda Carvalho, Antonio Calloni, Chico Díaz	Drama	
Antônia	Tata Amaral	Negra Li, Cindy Mendes, Leilah Moreno, Quelynah, Sandra de Sá	Drama, musical	
Árido Movie	Lírio Ferreira	Guilherme Weber, Giulia Gam	Drama	
Atos dos Homens	Kiko Goifman		Documentary	Won Best Documentary Award at Three Continents Festival
Baptism of Blood	Helvécio Ratton	Caio Blat, Daniel de Oliveira, Cássio Gabus Mendes, Ângelo Antônio	Drama	
Bog of Beasts	Claúdio Assis	Mariah Teixeira, Fernando Teixeira, Caio Blat, Matheus Nachtergaele	Drama	
Boleiros 2: Vencedores e Vencidos	Ugo Giorgetti	Lima Duarte, Otávio Augusto, Denise Fraga, Flávio Migliaccio	Comedy	
Brasília 18%	Nelson Pereira dos Santos	Carlos Alberto Riccelli, Malu Mader, Karine Carvalho	Drama	
Canta Maria	Francisco Ramalho Jr.	Vanessa Giácomo, Marco Ricca, Edward Boggis	Historical drama	
O Cheiro do Ralo	Lourenço Mutarelli	Selton Mello	Comedy	
Cobrador: In God We Trust	Paul Leduc	Peter Fonda, Lázaro Ramos, Antonella Costa	Drama	
Depois Daquele Baile	Roberto Bomtempo	Irene Ravache, Lima Duarte, Marcos Caruso	Romantic comedy	
Didi - O Caçador de Tesouros	Marcos Figueiredo	Renato Aragão	Family	
O Dono do Mar	Odorico Mendes	Regiane Alves, Jackson Costa, Daniela Escobar, Samara Felippo	Drama	
Eu Me Lembro	Edgar Navarro	Arly Arnaud, Lucas Valadares, Fernando Neves	Drama	
Falcão – Meninos do Tráfico	MV Bill		Documentary	
Fica Comigo Esta Noite	João Falcão	Alinne Moraes, Vladimir Brichta, Laura Cardoso, Gustavo Falcão	Comedy	
Gatão de Meia Idade	Antonio Carlos da Fontoura	Alexandre Borges, Júlia Lemmertz	Comedy	
The Greatest Love of All	Carlos Diegues	José Wilker, Taís Araújo	Romance drama	
Hércules 56	Sílvio Da-Rin		Documentary	
The House of Sand	Andrucha Waddington	Fernanda Montenegro, Fernanda Torres	Drama	2006 Sundance Film Festival
Irma Vap - O Retorno	Carla Camurati	Marco Nanini, Ney Latorraca	Comedy	
Memórias da Chibata	Marcos Manhães Marins	Léa Garcia, Jayme Periard, Babu Santana, Alexandre Rodrigues	Drama	Best film in Divercine, Uruguay
Muito Gelo e Dois Dedos D'Água	Daniel Filho	Mariana Ximenes, Thiago Lacerda, Paloma Duarte	Comedy	
Mulheres do Brasil	Malu de Martino	Roberta Rodrigues, Bete Coelho, Camila Pitanga, Luana Carvalho, Carla Daniel	Drama	
No Meio da Rua	Antonio Carlos da Fontoura	Guilherme Vieira, Cleslay Delfino	Comedy drama	
Noel - Poeta da Vila	Ricardo van Steen	Rafael Raposo, Camila Pitanga	Drama	Biopic about Noel Rosa
Olhar Estrangeiro	Lúcia Murat		Documentary	
Only God Knows	Carlos Bolado	Alice Braga, Diego Luna	Drama	Co-produced with Mexico
O Passageiro: Segredos de Adulto	Flavio R. Tambellini	Carolina Ferraz, Bernardo Marinho, Giulia Gam, Antonio Calloni	Drama	
Se Eu Fosse Você	Daniel Filho	Tony Ramos, Gloria Pires, Thiago Lacerda	Comedy	
Seus Problemas Acabaram!!!	José Lavigne	Casseta & Planeta, Murilo Benício	Comedy	
Sonhos e Desejos	Marcelo Santiago	Felipe Camargo, Mel Lisboa, Sérgio Marone	Drama	
Sonhos de Peixe	Kirill Mikhanovsky	José Maria Alves, Rubia Rafaelle, Phellipe Haagensen	Drama	2006 Cannes Film Festival
Suely in the Sky	Karim Aïnouz	Hermila Guedes	Drama	
Trair e Coçar É só Começar	Moacyr Góes	Adriana Esteves	Comedy	
O Veneno da Madrugada	Ruy Guerra	Leonardo Medeiros, Juliana Carneiro da Cunha, Fábio Sabag	Drama	
Vestido de Noiva	Joffre Rodrigues	Marília Pêra, Simone Spoladore, Letícia Sabatella, Marcos Winter	Dram	Based on a play by Nelson Rodrigues
Vinho de Rosas	Elza Cataldo	Amanda Vargas, Fernanda Vianna, Cristiane Antuña, Inês Peixoto	Drama	
Viúva Rica Solteira Não Fica	José Fonseca e Costa	Bianca Byington	Drama	Co-produced with Portugal
Wood & Stock: Sexo, Orégano e Rock'n'Roll	Otto Guerra	Zé Vítor Castiel, Sepé Tiaraju, Rita Lee	Animated	
Xuxa Gêmeas	Jorge Fernando	Xuxa	Family	
The Year My Parents Went on Vacation	Cao Hamburger	Michel Joelsas, Germano Haiut, Daniela Piepszyk, Caio Blat, Liliana Castro	Drama	
Zuzu Angel	Sérgio Rezende	Patrícia Pillar, Daniel de Oliveira, Luana Piovani, Alexandre Borges, Leandra Leal		

== See also ==
- 2006 in Brazil
- 2006 in Brazilian television
