= Grande Prêmio do Cinema Brasileiro for Best Film =

Film award category

The Grande Prêmio do Cinema Brasileiro for Best Film, given by the Ministry of Culture (2000–2001) and Academia Brasileira de Cinema (2002–present), awards the best film in Brazil.

== Winners and nominees ==
In the following table, the winner is marked in a separate colour.

=== 2000s ===
Year	English title	Original title	Director(s)	Ref.
2000	Orfeu		Cacá Diegues	
2000	A Glass of Rage	Um Copo de Cólera	Aluizio Abranches	
2000	Love and Co	Amor & Cia	Helvécio Ratton	
2000	Midnight	O Primeiro Dia	Walter Salles	
2000	Por Trás do Pano		Luiz Villaça	
2001	Me You Them	Eu, Tu, Eles	Andrucha Waddington	
2001	A Dog's Will	O Auto da Compadecida	Guel Arraes	
2001	Castelo Rá-Tim-Bum		Cao Hamburger	
2001	Cronicamente Inviável		Sérgio Bianchi	
2001	Santo Forte		Eduardo Coutinho	
2002	Brainstorm	Bicho de Sete Cabeças	Laís Bodanzki	
2002	Bufo & Spallanzani		Flávio R. Tambellini	
2002	Maids	Domésticas	Fernando Meirelles and Nando Olival	
2002	A Samba for Sherlock	O Xangô de Baker Street	Miguel Faria Jr.	
2002	To the Left of the Father	Lavoura Arcaica	Luiz Fernando Carvalho	
2003	City of God		Fernando Meirelles	
2003	Days of Nietzsche in Turin	Dias de Nietzsche em Turim	Júlio Bressane	
2003	Madame Satã		Karim Aïnouz	
2003	The Trespasser	O Invasor	Beto Brant	
2003	Two Summers	Houve Uma Vez Dois Verões	Jorge Furtado	
2004	The Man Who Copied	O Homem que Copiava	Jorge Furtado	
2004	Breaking Up	Separações	Domingos de Oliveira	
2004	Carandiru		Hector Babenco	
2004	Lisbela e o Prisioneiro		Guel Arraes	
2004	Mango Yellow	Amarelo Manga	Cláudio Assis	
2005	Cazuza – Time Doesn't Stop	Cazuza – O Tempo Não Pára	Walter Carvalho and Sandra Werneck	
2005	Contra Todos		Roberto Moreira	
2005	The Storytellers	Narradores de Javé	Eliane Caffé	
2005	The Other Side of the Street	O Outro Lado da Rua	Marcos Bernstein	
2005	Redeemer	Redentor	Cláudio Torres	
2007	Cinema, Aspirins and Vultures	Cinema, Aspirinas e Urubus	Marcelo Gomes	
2007	Árido Movie		Lírio Ferreira	
2007	Bendito Fruto		Sérgio Goldenberg	
2007	Delicate Crime	Crime Delicado	Beto Brant	
2007	The House of Sand	Casa de Areia	Andrucha Waddington	
2007	Lower City	Cidade Baixa	Sérgio Machado	
2007	Se Eu Fosse Você		Daniel Filho	
2007	Two Sons of Francisco	2 Filhos de Francisco	Breno Silveira	
2008	The Year My Parents Went on Vacation	O Ano em que Meus Pais Saíram de Férias	Cao Hamburger	
2008	Bog of Beasts	Baixio das Bestas	Cláudio Assis	
2008	O Cheiro do Ralo		Heithor Dhalia	
2008	Elite Squad	Tropa de Elite	José Padilla	
2008	Suely in the Sky	O Céu de Suely	Karim Aïnouz	
2009	Estômago		Marcos Jorge	
2009	Blindness	Ensaio sobre a Cegueira	Fernando Meirelles	
2009	Linha de Passe		Walter Salles	
2009	Meu Nome Não É Johnny		Mauro Lima	
2009	The Pope's Toilet	O Banheiro do Papa	César Charlone	

=== 2010s ===
Year	English title	Original title	Director	Ref.
2010	É Proibido Fumar		Anna Muylaert	
2010	Adrift	À Deriva	Heitor Dhalia	
2010	Divã		José Alvarenga Jr.	
2010	The Invisible Woman	A Mulher Invisivel	Cláudio Torres	
2010	Se Eu Fosse Você 2		Daniel Filho	
2011	Elite Squad: The Enemy Within	Tropa de Elite 2: o Inimigo agora É Outro	José Padilla	
2011	The Best Things in the World	As Melhores Coisas do Mundo	Laís Bodanzki	
2011	Blue Eyes	Olhos Azuis	José Joffily	
2011	Chico Xavier		Daniel Filho	
2011	Five times Favela – Now by Ourselves	5x Favela, Agora por Nós Mesmos	Cacau Amaral	
2011	I Travel Because I Have to, I Come Back Because I Love You	Viajo Porque Preciso, Volto Porque te Amo	Karim Aïnouz and Marcelo Gomes	
2012	The Clown	O Palhaço	Selton Mello	
2012	Assalto ao Banco Central		Marcos Paulo	
2012	Bróder		Jeferson De	
2012	Bruna Surfistinha		Marcus Baldini	
2012	O Homem do Futuro		Cláudio Torres	
2013	Gonzaga - De Pai pra Filho		Breno Silveira	
2013	Dirty Hearts	Corações Sujos	Vicente Amorim	
2013	Heleno		José Henrique Fonseca	
2013	Rat Fever	Febre do Rato	Cláudio Assis	
2013	Xingu	Xingu	Cao Hamburger	
2014	Faroeste Caboclo		Rene Sampaio	
2014	Cine Holliúdy		Halder Gomes	
2014	Neighbouring Sounds	O Som ao Redor	Kleber Mendonça Filho	
2014	Reaching for the Moon	Flores Raras	Bruno Barreto	
2014	Tattoo	Tatuagem	Hilton Lacerda	
2015	A Wolf at the Door	O Lobo Atrás da Porta	Fernando Coimbra	
2015	Getúlio		João Jardim	
2015	Hoje Eu Quero Voltar Sozinho	Hoje Eu Quero Voltar Sozinho	Daniel Ribeiro	
2015	Praia do Futuro	Praia do Futuro	Karim Aïnouz	
2015	Tim Maia		Mauro Lima	
2016	The Second Mother	Que Horas Ela Volta?	Anna Muylaert	
2016	A história da eternidade		Camilo Cavalcanti	
2016	Ausência		Chico Teixeira	
2016	Califórnia		Marina Person	
2016	Casa Grande		Felipe Gamarano Barbosa	
2016	Chatô, o Rei do Brasil		Guilherme Fontes	
2016	Sangue Azul		Lírio Ferreira	
2016	Tudo que aprendemos juntos		Sérgio Machado	
2017	Aquarius		Kleber Mendonça Filho	
2017	Elis		Hugo Prata	
2017	Don't Call Me Son	Mãe Só Há Uma	Anna Muylaert	
2017	Neon Bull	Boi Neon	Gabriel Mascaro	
2017	Nise: The Heart of Madness	Nise: O Coração da Loucura	Roberto Berliner	
2018	Bingo: The King of the Mornings	Bingo: O Rei das Manhãs	Daniel Rezende	
2018	A Glória e a Graça		Flávio Ramos Tambellini	
2018	Era o Hotel Cambridge		Eliane Caffé	
2018	Gabriel and the Mountain	Gabriel e a Montanha	Fellipe Gamarano Barbosa	
2018	Just Like Our Parents	Como Nossos Pais	Laís Bodanzky	
2019	Loveling	Benzinho	Gustavo Pizzi	
2019	A Voz do Silêncio		André Ristum	
2019	Chacrinha: O Velho Guerreiro		Andrucha Waddington	
2019	O Grande Circo Místico	O Grande Circo Místico	Carlos Diegues	
2019	O Paciente: O Caso Tancredo Neves		Sergio Rezende	

=== 2020s ===
Year	English title	Original title	Director	Ref.
2020	Bacurau		Kleber Mendonça Filho and Juliano Dornelles	
2020	Divine Love	Divino Amor	Gabriel Mascaro	
2020	Hebe: A Estrela do Brasil		Maurício Farias	
2020	The Invisible Life of Eurídice Gusmão	A Vida Invisível de Eurídice Gusmão	Karim Aïnouz	
2020	Simonal		Leonardo Domingues	
2021	A Febre	The Fever	Maya Da-Rin	
2021	Boca de Ouro		Daniel Filho	
2021	Cidade Pássaro	Shine Your Eyes	Matias Mariani	
2021	A Divisão		Vicente Amorim	
2021	Pacarrete		Allan Deberton	
2022	Marighella		Wagner Moura	
2022	7 Prisioneiros	7 Prisoners	Alexandre Moratto	
2022	Depois a Louca Sou Eu		Júlia Rezende	
2022	Deserto Particular	Private Desert	Aly Muritiba	
2022	Homem Onça		Vinícius Reis	
2023	Marte Um	Mars One	Gabriel Martins	
2023	Eduardo e Mônica		René Sampaio	
2023	Medida Provisória	Executive Order	Lázaro Ramos	
2023	Paloma		Marcelo Gomes	
2023	A Viagem de Pedro		Laís Bodanzky	
2024	Pedágio	Toll	Carolina Markowicz	
2024	Mussum, o Filmis		Silvio Guindane	
2024	Noites Alienígenas		Sérgio de Carvalho	
2024	Nosso Sonho		Eduardo Albergaria	
2024	O Sequestro do Voo 375		Marcus Baldini	
2025	I'm Still Here	Ainda Estou Aqui	Walter Salles	
2025	Baby		Marcelo Caetano	
2025	White House	Kasa Branca	Luciano Vidigal	
2025	Malu		Pedro Freire	
2025	Motel Destino		Karim Aïnouz	
2026	Manas (tie)		Marianna Brennand	
2026	The Secret Agent (tie)	O Agente Secreto	Kleber Mendonça Filho	
2026	Latin Blood: The Ballad of Ney Matogrosso	Homem com H	Esmir Filho	
2026	The Son of a Thousand Men	O Filho del Mil Homens	Daniel Rezende	
2026	The Blue Trail	O Último Azul	Gabriel Mascaro	
