= List of Brazilian film directors =

This is a list of notable Brazilian film directors born in Brazil or who have established Brazilian citizenship or residency.

== Pioneers ==
- Lima Barreto
- Humberto Mauro
- Mário Peixoto

== Cinema Novo ==
- Joaquim Pedro de Andrade
- Cacá Diegues
- Ruy Guerra
- Leon Hirszman
- Arnaldo Jabor
- Glauber Rocha
- Roberto Santos
- Nelson Pereira dos Santos
- Paulo César Saraceni

== Cinema marginal ==
- Júlio Bressane
- José Mojica Marins
- Rogério Sganzerla
- João Silvério Trevisan

== Others in the 1960s/1970s/1980s ==
- Hector Babenco
- Ana Carolina
- Eduardo Coutinho
- Anselmo Duarte
- Roberto Farias
- Walter Hugo Khouri
- Walter Lima, Jr.
- Luis Sérgio Person

== Retoma and Post Retomada ==
- Alê Abreu
- Aluizio Abranches
- Gilda de Abreu
- Carine Adler
- Karim Aïnouz
- Renalto Alves
- Tata Amaral
- Fernando Grostein Andrade
- João Batista de Andrade
- Joel Zito Araújo
- Cláudio Assis
- Bruno Barreto
- Fábio Barreto
- Luiz de Barros
- Laís Bodanzky
- Beto Brant
- João Callegaro
- Carla Camurati
- Maurice Capovila
- Arturo Carrari
- Luiz Fernando Carvalho
- Alberto Cavalcanti
- César Charlone
- Carlos Coimbra
- Heitor Dhalia
- Miguel Faria, Jr.
- Daniel Filho
- Jorge Furtado
- Cao Hamburger
- Carlos Imperial
- Tatiana Issa
- Natalia Leite
- Kátia Lund
- Sérgio Machado
- Carolina Markowicz
- Amácio Mazzaropi
- Fernando Meirelles
- Selton Mello
- Flávio Migliaccio
- Jayme Monjardim
- David Neves
- Carlos Augusto de Oliveira
- José Padilha
- Tom Payne
- Paulo Porto
- Afonso Poyart
- Guilherme de Almeida Prado
- Helvécio Ratton
- Sérgio Rezende
- Daniel Ribeiro
- Sérgio Ricardo
- Juliana Rojas
- Juliana Sakae
- João Moreira Salles
- Walter Salles
- Roberto Santucci
- David Schurmann
- Silvio Tendler
- Paulo Thiago
- Daniela Thomas
- Sérgio Toledo
- Pedro Vasconcellos
- Andrucha Waddington
- Tizuka Yamasaki
