= 1st Grande Prêmio Cinema Brasil =

- Date: February 12, 2000
- Site: Palácio Quitandinha; Petrópolis, Rio de Janeiro, Brazil
- Hosted by: Regina Casé
- Directed by: José Possi Neto

Highlights
- Best Film: Orfeu
- Most awards: Orfeu and O Primeiro Dia (3)
- Most nominations: O Primeiro Dia (9)

Television coverage
- Network: TV Cultura and Televisão Educativa

The 1st Grande Prêmio Cinema Brasil ceremony, presented by the Ministry of Culture of Brazil, honored the best audiovisual productions of 1999. It took place on February 12, 2000, at the Palácio Quitandinha in the city of Petrópolis, Rio de Janeiro. During the ceremony, the Ministry of Culture presented the Grande Prêmio Cinema Brasil in 17 categories. The ceremony, televised by TV Cultura and Televisão Educativa, was directed by José Possi Neto and hosted by actress Regina Casé.

The film O Primeiro Dia (Midnight) was nominated for nine awards (the most of any film), followed by Orfeu with seven nominations. O Primeiro Dia and Orfeu tied for the most awards won, with three each. Other film winners included Nós que Aqui Estamos por Vós Esperamos with two awards, and Por Trás do Pano, Outras Estórias and Dois Córregos with one each.

== Background ==
After a decree during the administration of President Fernando Collor de Mello abolished government support of cinema production, almost no films were domestically produced in the early 1990s. In 1991, only one percent of films on screen in Brazil were produced in the country, and in 1992 only two Brazilian films were released. In 1993 (after Collor's impeachment), the government enacted a tax incentive for film production, and the "Retomada" (lit. "Resumption"), a film renaissance, began. As of 1998, five percent of films in cinemas were Brazilian. The Ministry of Culture of Brazil established the national film awards in November 1999 to recognize works and individuals in the audiovisual area; 16 categories and a special award were created. With the awards, the Ministry of Culture aimed to foster the retomada by increasing domestic audiences; their goal was for 20% of films in Brazil to be produced domestically as of 2002.

== Ceremony ==
The ceremony was held on February 12, 2000, beginning at 9:27 p.m. BRT. It took place at the Palácio Quitandinha, a former luxury resort hotel in Petrópolis, State of Rio de Janeiro, Brazil. (Note: Scheduled to start at 8:30 p.m. BRT, the ceremony was delayed in 57 minutes.) Televised by TV Cultura and Televisão Educativa, the ceremony was directed by José Possi Neto and hosted by actress Regina Casé. The ceremony started with a montage of important scenes of Brazilian production over the years. The presentation of awards followed, interspersed with live musical performances by the Best Score nominees and homages to actresses Fernanda Montenegro, Vera Fischer, and Zezé Motta and filmmakers Anselmo Duarte and Joaquim Pedro de Andrade.

== Winners and nominees ==
On December 8, 1999, the nominees for six categories of the 1st Grande Prêmio Cinema Brasil were announced at Brasília. These categories were Best Film, Best Foreign Language Film, Best Director, Best Actor, Best Actress and Best Television Series. The nominees for the other 11 categories were announced on January 20, 2000. The films receiving the most nominations were O Primeiro Dia with nine and Orfeu with seven. The winners were announced during the awards ceremony on February 12, 2000.

=== Awards ===
Winners are listed first and highlighted in boldface.

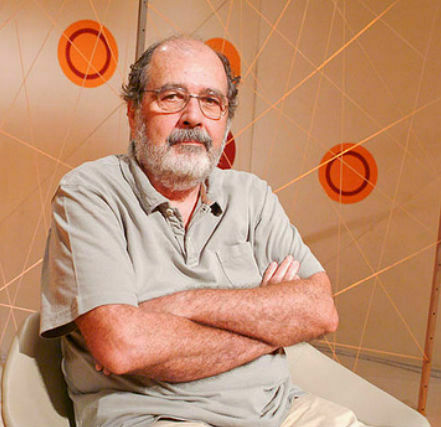
Carlos Diegues, director of Orfeu, Best Film winner

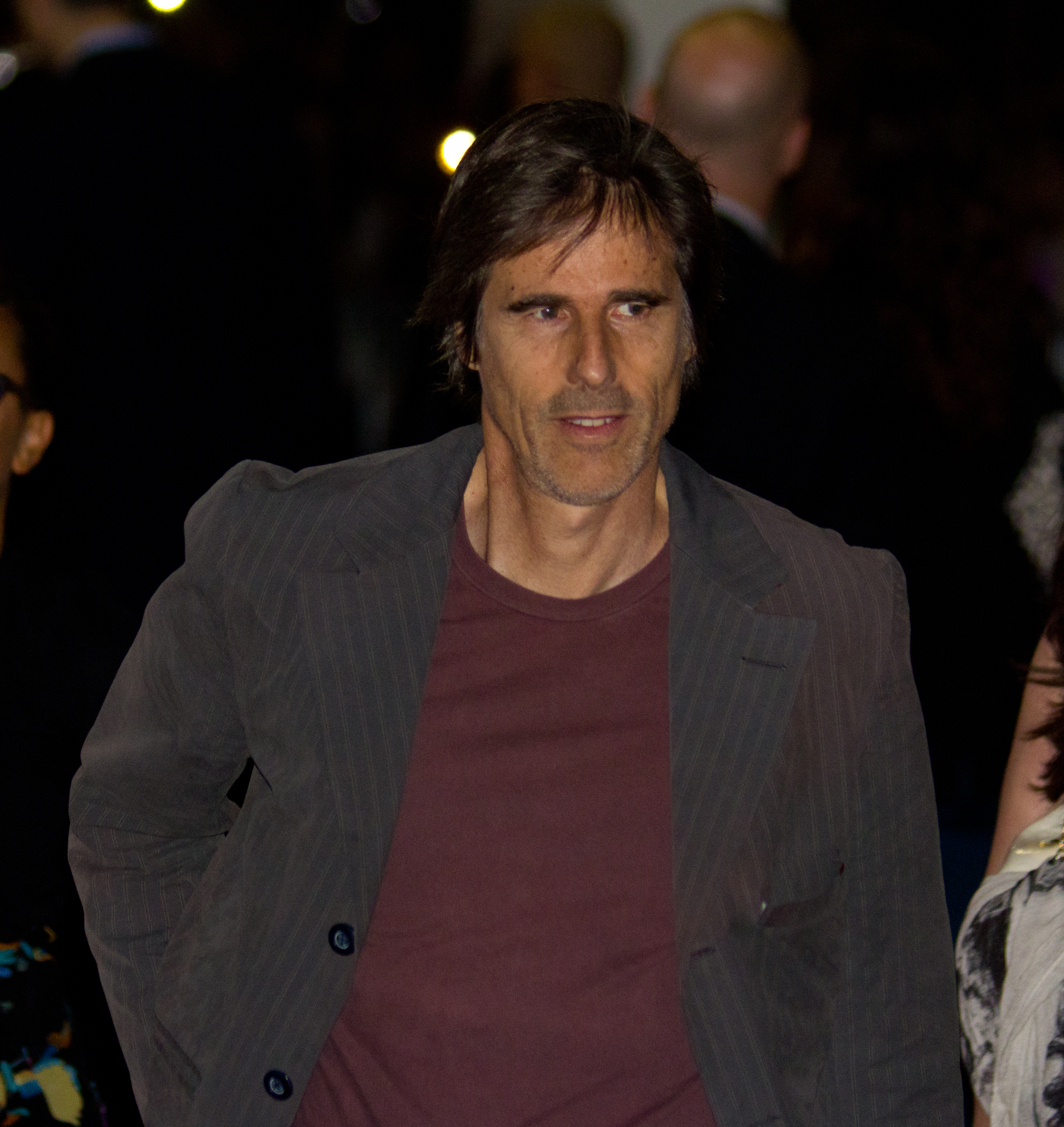
Walter Salles, Best Director winner along with Daniela Thomas

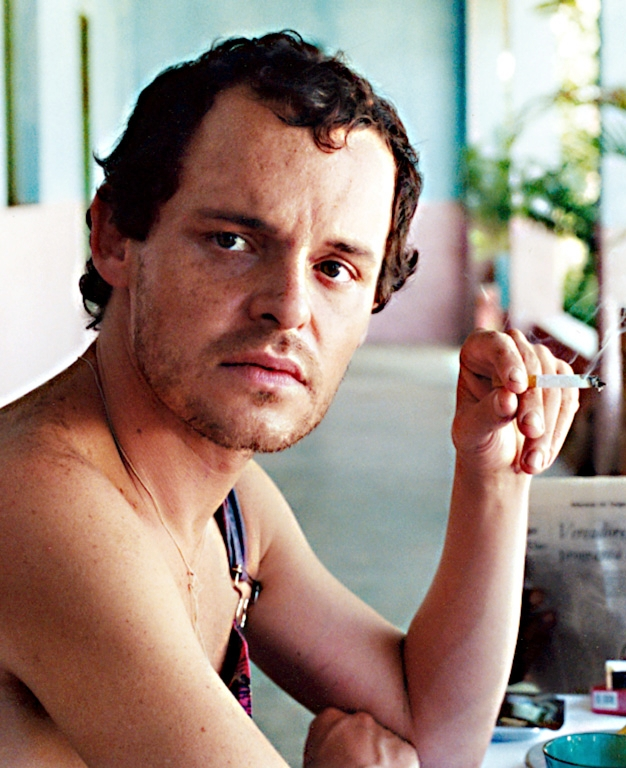
Matheus Nachtergaele, Best Actor winner

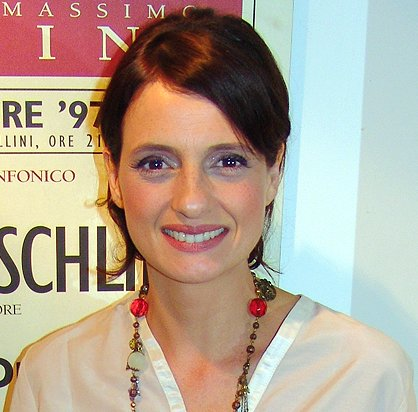
Denise Fraga, Best Actress winner

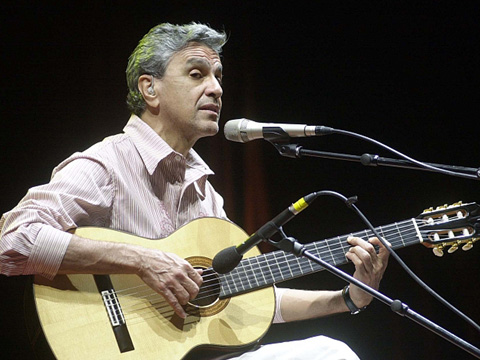
Caetano Veloso, composer of Orfeu, Best Score co-winner

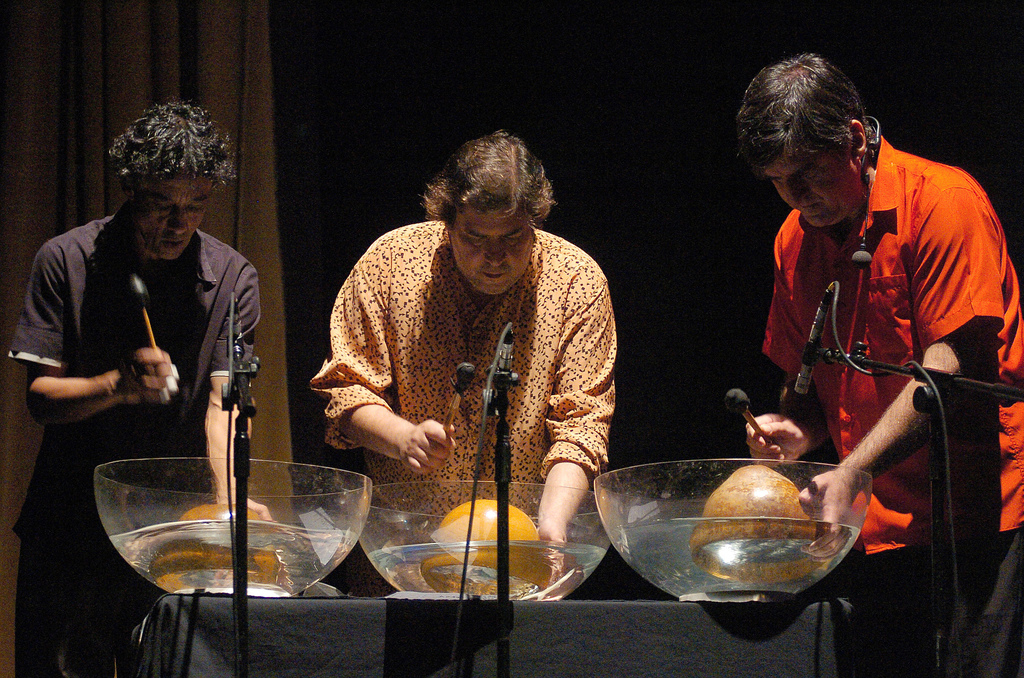
Uakti, composer of Outras Estórias, Best Score co-winner

Best Film	Best Foreign Language Film
**Orfeu** – **Carlos Diegues**; Amor & Cia – Helvécio Ratton; Um Copo de Cólera – Aluizio Abranches; Por Trás do Pano – Luiz Villaça; O Primeiro Dia – Walter Salles and Daniela Thomas	**Todo sobre mi madre** – **Pedro Almodóvar**; Deconstructing Harry – Woody Allen; Eyes Wide Shut – Stanley Kubrick; Festen – Thomas Vinterberg; Hana-bi – Takeshi Kitano
Best Director	Best Screenplay (tie)
**Walter Salles and Daniela Thomas** – O Primeiro Dia; Carlos Diegues – Orfeu; Carlos Reichenbach – Dois Corrégos; Hector Babenco – Corazón iluminado; Luiz Villaça – Por Trás do Pano	**Dois Corrégos** – **Carlos Reichenbach**; **O Primeiro Dia** – **Daniela Thomas, João Emanuel Carneiro, Walter Salles and José de Carvalho**; Outras Estórias – Pedro Bial and Alcione Araújo; Por Trás do Pano – Luiz Villaça and Flávio Souza; São Jerônimo – Júlio Bressane
Best Actor	Best Actress
**Matheus Nachtergaele** – **O Primeiro Dia** and **O Auto da Compadecida**; Daniel Dantas – Traição; Marco Nanini – Amor & Cia; Murilo Benício – Orfeu and Até que a Vida Nos Separe; Othon Bastos – Mauá – O Imperador e o Rei	**Denise Fraga** – **Por Trás do Pano**; Fernanda Torres – Traição and o Primeiro Dia; Júlia Lemmertz – Um Copo De Cólera, A Hora Mágica e Até que a Vida Nos Separe; Marília Pêra – O Viajante; Maria Luiza Mendonça – Corazón iluminado
Best Cinematography	Best Editing
**Orfeu** – **Affonso Beato**; Um Copo de Cólera – Pedro Farkas; Corazón iluminado – Lauro Escorel; O Primeiro Dia – Walter Carvalho; Outras Estórias – José Guerra	**Nós que Aqui Estamos por Vós Esperamos** – **Marcelo Masagão**; Um Copo de Cólera – Idê Lacreta; Fé – Eduardo Escorel; Orfeu – Sérgio Meckler; O Primeiro Dia – Felipe Lacerda
Best Score (tie)	Best Release
**Orfeu** – **Caetano Veloso**; **Outras Estórias** – **Uakti**; Um Copo de Cólera – André Abujamra; Orfeu – Ivan Lins; O Primeiro Dia – Antonio Pinto, Eduardo Bid e Naná Vasconcelos	**Nós que Aqui Estamos por Vós Esperamos** – **Marcelo Masagão**; Um Copo de Cólera – Aluizio Abranches; Orfeu – Carlos Diegues; Outras Estórias – Pedro Bial; O Primeiro Dia – Walter Salles and Daniela Thomas
Best Short Film (tie)	Best Documentary Film
**03 Minutos** – **Ana Luiza Azevedo**; **Uma Estória de Futebol** – **Paulo Machline**; O Oitavo Selo – Tomás Creus; Rota de Colisão – Roberval Duarte; Texas Hotel – Cláudio Assis	**Cine Mambembe – O Cinema Descobre o Brasil** – **Laís Bodanzky and Luiz Bolognesi**; Atlântico Negro – Na Rota dos Orixás – Renato Barbieri; Bubula – O Cara Vermelha – Luís Eduardo Jorge; A Pessoa É para o que Nasce – Roberto Berliner; Por Longos Dias – Mauro Giuntini (Note: Mauro Giuntini is wrongly listed as "Mauro Barbieri" by Folha de S.Paulo.)
Best Animated Feature	Best Video
**De Janela Pro Cinema** – **Quiá Rodrigues**; Amassa que Elas Gostam – Fernando Coster; Castelos de Vento – Tânia Anaya; Deus É Pai – Allan Sieber; Espantalho – Alê Abreu	**Carlos Nader** – **Carlos Nader**; Bruxa Viva – Lena Bastos; Framed by Curtains – Eder Santos; Pranto por Ignácio Sanchez de Mejias – Sérgio Roizemblitz; Viagens na Fronteira – Oiapoque – Lucas Bambozzi
Best Television Series	Best Television Cultural Production
**O Auto da Compadecida** – **Rede Globo**; Chiquinha Gonzaga – Rede Globo; Labirinto – Rede Globo; Mulher – Rede Globo	**Pierre Fatumbi Verger** – **Luís Buarque de Hollanda/GNT**; Confidência do Rio das Mortes – Paschoal Samora/Grifa Filmes; Genoma: Em Busca dos Sonhos da Ciência – Mônica Teixeira/TV Cultura; Expedição Caiçaras – Tatiana Soares/Canal Azul; Mapas Urbanos – Daniel Augusto/Grifa Filmes
Mário Peixoto Award	
**Canal Brasil**; Cine Odeon; Jean-Claude Bernardet; Laís Bodanzky and Luiz Bolognesi; Vampeta	

=== Multiple nominations and awards ===
The following eleven films received multiple nominations.

- Nine: O Primeiro Dia
- Seven: Orfeu
- Six: Um Copo de Cólera
- Four: Outras Estórias and Por Trás do Pano
- Three: Dois Córregos
- Two: Amor & Cia, Até que a Vida Nos Separe, Corazón iluminado, Nós que aqui Estamos por Vós Esperamos and Traição

The following three films received multiple awards.

- Three: Orfeu and O Primeiro Dia
- Two: Nós que Aqui Estamos por Vós Esperamos

== See also ==
- List of Brazilian films of the 1990s
- 2000 in film
