= Felipe Sholl =

Brazilian screenwriter and film director

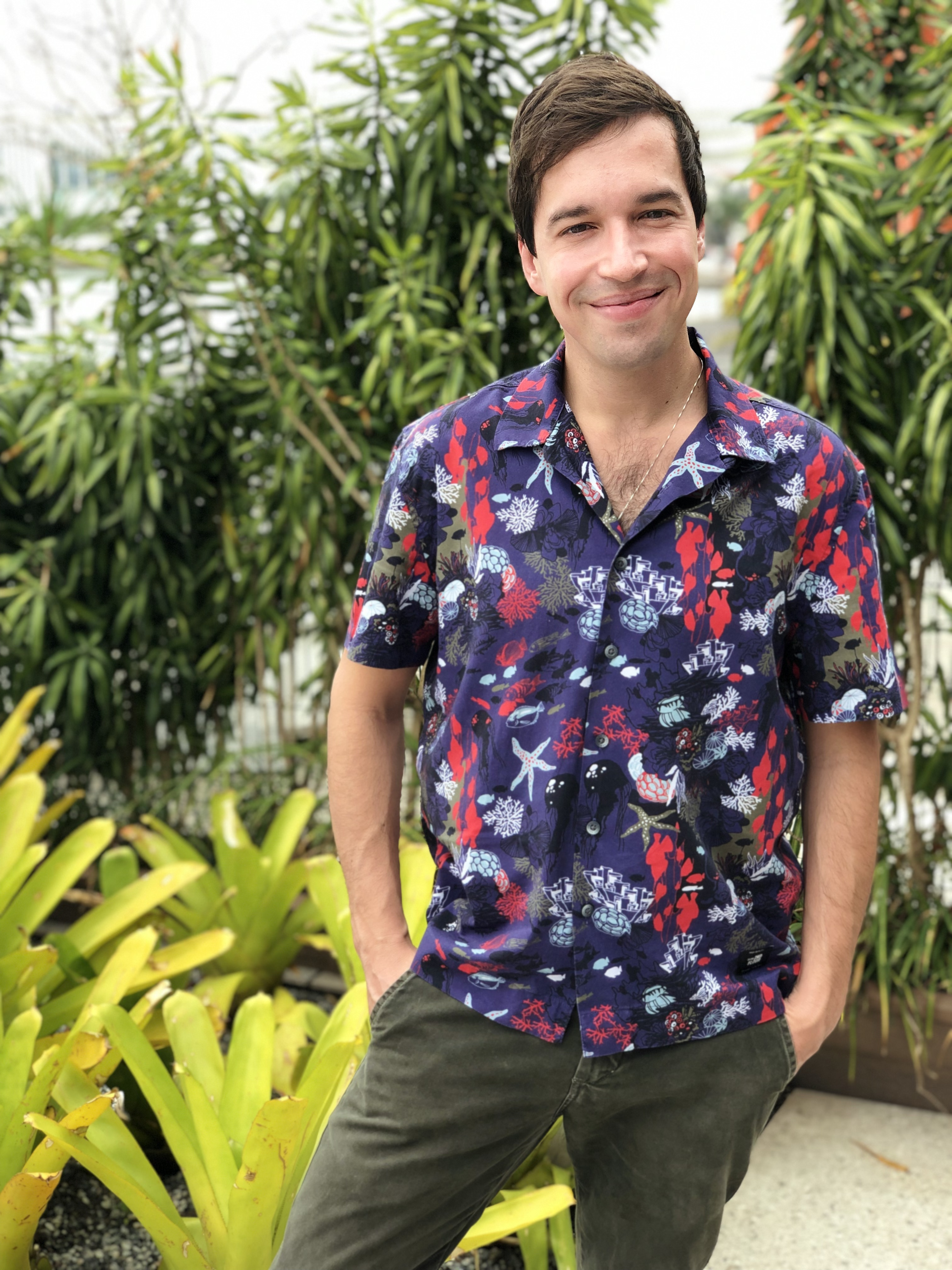
Felipe Sholl (picture by Guilherme Arruda). Taken from: https://panorama.coisadecinema.com.br/panlab-de-roteiro/

Felipe Sholl Machado (Rio de Janeiro, April 5, 1982) is a Brazilian screenwriter and film director.

== Filmography ==
Year	Title	Role	Notes
2007	Tá	Writer/Director	Short
2010	Gisela	Writer/Director	Short
2011	Hoje	Writer	
2011	Found Memories (Histórias que só existem quando lembradas)	Writer	
2014	Trinta	Writer	
2015	Campo Grande	Writer	
2016	The Other End (Fala Comigo)	Writer/Director	
2019	Vítimas Digitais	Writer	TV series
2019	M8 Quando a Morte Socorre a Vida	Writer	
2019	The Traitor	Contributing Writer: Brazil	
2020	Memory House	Writer	
2024	Manas	Writer	

== Awards ==
- Best Film for The Other End at the Rio de Janeiro International Film Festival (2016)
- Best Adapted Screenplay for M8 Quando a Morte Socorre a Vida at the Cinema Brazil Grand Prize (2021)
- Best Screenplay for Hoje at the Brasília Film Festival (2011)
- Teddy Award (Best Short) for Tá at the Berlinale (2008)
