= Data Favela =

Brazilian research institute

Data Favela is a research institute founded in November 2013 in Rio de Janeiro, Brazil, by Celso Athayde, founder of Central Única das Favelas (Cufa), and Renato Meirelles, President of Data Popular.

Data Favela is the first research institute focused on the economic activity of Brazilian favelas, studying the behavior and consumption of its residents, and identifying business opportunities for external and internal parties who wish to develop operations in these territories. With its wide base of expertise and knowledge of Brazilian favelas and their markets, Data Favela trains the residents themselves to implement its research.

== Research ==
There are 11.7 million people living in Brazilian favelas – the equivalent of the 5th largest state in Brazil, population wise. In 10 years alone, the proportion of middle class residents in the favelas has risen from 33 to 65% of their population. Indeed, the residents of favelas have a combined annual income of R$63.2 billion, the equivalent of the total consumption of countries such as Paraguay and Bolivia. Of this wealth, more than half is concentrated in the south-east of Brazil. DataFavela has also participated in important research tracing the impacts of the COVID-19 pandemic on the economic wellbeing of favela residents.
