= Something in the Air (disambiguation) =

"Something in the Air" is a song by Thunderclap Newman.

Something in the Air may also refer to:

== Film and television ==
- Something in the Air (2002 film), a Brazilian film directed by Helvécio Ratton
- Something in the Air (2012 film), a French film directed by Olivier Assayas
- Something in the Air (TV series), an Australian soap opera
- "Something in the Air" (Surgical Spirit), a 1990 television episode

== Music ==
- Something in the Air (album) or the title song, by Lila McCann, 1999
- "Something in the Air", a song by David Bowie from Hours
- "Something in the Air", a song by Information Society from Information Society
- "Something in the Air", a song by Lauren Mayberry from Vicious Creature
