= Árido Movie =

2006 film directed by Lírio Ferreira

- Directed by: Lírio Ferreira
- Written by: Lírio Ferreira; Hilton Lacerda; Sérgio Oliveira; Eduardo Nunes
- Produced by: Murilo Salles
- Starring: Guilherme Weber; Giulia Gam
- Cinematography: Murilo Salles
- Edited by: Vânia Debs
- Release date: 2005
- Country: Brazil
- Language: Portuguese

Árido Movie is a 2005 Brazilian drama film written and directed by Lírio Ferreira. It premiered in the Horizons section at the 62nd edition of the Venice Film Festival. Released in Brazil in 2006, it was nominated for Best Film at the 2007 Grande Prêmio do Cinema Brasileiro.

== Cast ==
- Guilherme Weber as Jonas
- Giulia Gam as Soledad
- Gustavo Falcão as Falcão
- Selton Mello as Bob
- Mariana Lima as Vera
- José Dumont as Zé Elétrico
- Suyane Moreira as Wedja
- Luiz Carlos Vasconcelos as Jurandir
- Aramis Trindade as Márcio Greyck
- Matheus Nachtergaele as Salustiano
- Maria de Jesus Bacarelli as Dona Carmo
- Renata Sorrah as Stela
