= Babu Santana =

Brazilian actor and singer (born 1979)

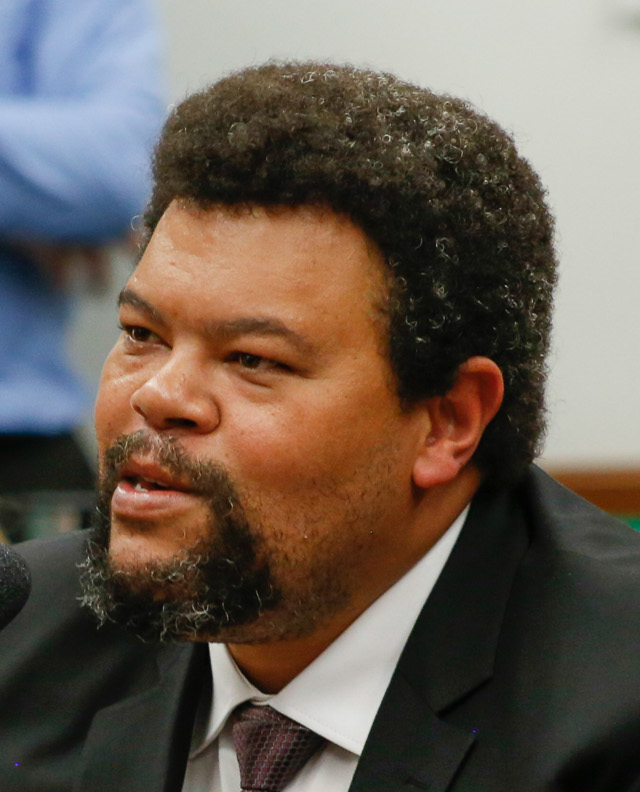
- Santana in 2022
- Born: Alexandre da Silva Santana; December 10, 1979 (age 46); Vidigal, Rio de Janeiro, Brazil
- Occupations: Actor, singer
- Years active: 2002–present

Alexandre da Silva Santana (born December 10, 1979), known professionally as Babu Santana, is a Brazilian actor and singer. Born in Vidigal, Rio de Janeiro, Santana acted in plays at school since his 12 years and joined the theater group Nós do Morro when he was 17. His first roles in films were in 2002 when he acted in City of God and Something in the Air. In addition to being an actor, Babu is the vocalist of the band Babu Santana e Os Cabeças de Água-Viva, the band fuses samba, reggae, soul and funk. He is the father of two daughters and one son.

In 2020, Babu was one of the housemates on Big Brother Brasil 20, finishing at 4th place.

== Filmography ==
Cinema
Year	Title	Role	Notes
2002	City of God	Grande	Credited as Alexandre Santana
2002	Something in the Air	Roque	
2004	Almost Brothers	Pingão	
2004	Redeemer	Júnior	
2006	Baptism of Blood	Prison officer	
2007	City of Men	Bald's Hill chief	
2007	Estômago	Bujilú	
2008	My Name Ain't Johnny	Military office	
2008	Plastic City	Beto	
2011	Família Vende Tudo	Babão	
2012	Os Penetras	Adelair	
2014	Copa de Elite	Jamba	
2014	Júlio Sumiu	Caolho	
2014	Tim Maia	Tim Maia	
2016	Mundo Cão	Santana	
2018	Praça Paris	Shepherd	
2023	Rule 34	André	
2024	White House (2024 film)		

Television
Year	Title	Role	Notes
2001	Young Hearts	José	8th Season
2003	Carga Pesada	Antônio	Special participation
2004	The Big Family	Soldier	
2005	A Diarista	Bil	Special participation
2006	Young Hearts	Lourival's Henchman	12th Season
2007	Two Faces	Montanha	Special participation
2008	Guerra e Paz	Businessman	Special participation
2009	India: A Love Story	Patient	Special participation
2009	Seize the Day	Coisa Ruim	Special participation
2010	As Cariocas	Maracanã Seller	Special participation
2011	O Astro	Jaé	Special participation
2012	The Brazilians: The Women	Edmundo	
2015	I Love Paraisópolis	Javaí	
2016	Mister Brau	Delegate Santana	Special participation
2016	Vai Que Cola	Sanhaço	Special participation
2017	New World	Jacinto	
2018	Que Marravilha! Aula de Cozinha	Contestant (Himself)	2nd Place
2019	Carcereiros	Edgar de Souza	
2019	Tô de Graça	Edvaldo	Special participation
2020	Big Brother Brasil	Himself (Housemate)	Season 20 (4th Place)
2021	Salve-se Quem Puder	Nanico	
2023	The Masked Singer Brasil	Coruja	Season 3
2023	Amor Perfeito	Father Severo	
2026	Big Brother Brasil	Himself (Housemate)	Season 26

== Discography ==
Year	Title	Album	Notes
2020	"Sou Babu"	Single	
2020	"Soul África"	Single	

== Awards and nominations ==
Year	Title	Category	Nomination	Result	Ref.
2007	Rio de Janeiro International Film Festival	Best Supporting Actor	Estômago	Won	
2009	Portuguese Language Countries Film Festival	Best Supporting Actor	Estômago	Won	
2009	Grande Prêmio do Cinema Brasileiro	Best Supporting Actor	Estômago	Won	
2015	SESC Film Festival	Best Actor	Tim Maia	Won	
2015	Grande Prêmio do Cinema Brasileiro	Best Actor	Tim Maia	Won	
2015	Grande Prêmio do Cinema Brasileiro	Best Supporting Actor	Julio Sumiu	Nominated	
2020	Prêmio Rede BBB 2020	Best Monster Punishment	Big Brother Brasil 20	Won	
