= Manas (film) =

2024 drama film

- Theatrical release poster
- Directed by: Marianna Brennand
- Written by: Marianna Brennand; Felipe Sholl; Marcelo Grabowsky; Antonia Pellegrino; Camila Agustini; Carolina Benevides
- Produced by: Marianna Brennand
- Starring: Jamilli Correa; Fátima Macedo; Rômulo Braga; Dira Paes
- Cinematography: Pierre de Kerchove
- Edited by: Isabela Monteiro de Castro
- Production companies: Canal Brasil; Fado Filmes; Globo Filmes; Inquietude; Pródigo Filmes; Les Films du Fleuve
- Distributed by: Paris Filmes (Brazil)
- Release dates: September 2, 2024 (Venice); May 15, 2025 (Brazil)
- Running time: 106 minutes
- Countries: Brazil; Portugal; Belgium
- Language: Portuguese

Manas (lit. 'Sisters') is a 2024 drama film co-written and directed by Marianna Brennand, in her feature film debut. It stars Jamilli Correa, Fátima Macedo, Rômulo Braga and Dira Paes.

The film had its world premiere in the Giornate degli Autori section of the 81st Venice International Film Festival, where it won Director's Award, the section's main prize. It went on to win Best Film, Best Director, Best Original Screenplay, and Best Editing at the 25th Grande Otelo Awards.

== Plot ==
Marcielle, a 13-year-old girl, struggles to survive amidst a network of sexual abuse and child sexual exploitation in a small riverside community of Marajó, in the Amazon rainforest.

== Cast ==
- Jamilli Correa as Marcielle
- Fátima Macedo as Danielle
- Rômulo Braga as Marcílio
- Dira Paes as Aretha
- Emily Pantoja as Carol
- Samira Eloá as Cynthia
- Gabriel Rodrigues as Danilio
- Enzo Maia as Marcéu

== Production ==
Documentary filmmaker Marianna Brennand's feature debut, the film is the result of her 10 years of research on the subject of child sexual abuse in the Amazon rainforest villages. It was produced by Inquietude, with Globo Filmes, Canal Brasil, Pródigo and Fado Filmes serving as co-producers; Dardenne brothers and Walter Salles served as associate producers. Sean Penn joined the film as executive producer in September 2025.

== Release ==
The film premiered at the 81st Venice International Film Festival, in the Giornate degli Autori sidebar, where it won the Director's Award. The film had its Brazilian commercial release on May 15, 2025.

== Reception ==
The film received general positive reviews by critics. Vittoria Scarpa from Cineuropa write that the film "leaves you stunned – for the story it tells, for how it tells it and for the piercing performances of its actors". International Cinephile Society's Matthew Joseph Jenner described it as "a challenging film, but one that still manages to be captivating in spite of some of its thornier, more disconcerting material. It is beautifully constructed, with the cinematography in particular being a highlight".

The film won the Critics Award for Best Brazilian Film at the 48th São Paulo International Film Festival, a Huelva Special Jury Prize and the Audience Award at the 50th Huelva Ibero-American Film Festival, and the Jury Prize at the 33rd Rio de Janeiro International Film Festival.

The Brazilian Academy of Cinema submitted Manas as the Brazilian entry for Best Ibero-American Film at the 40th Goya Awards; the film was nominated.

=== Oscar submission controversy ===
By August, Manas was shortlisted alongside other five feature films in the Brazilian submission process for the Academy Award for Best International Feature. Even though The Secret Agent (2025) by Kleber Mendonça Filho was considered a critic favorite after its Cannes' Best Director and Best Actor prizes alongside a strong Neon awards season campaign, reports emerged indicating a possible snub in favor of Manas, which was being supported by 70 high-profiled business companies for its "urgent subject in Brazil". The movement created a public uproar due to the perception of political and personal abuse of the Oscar submission process instead of merit and commercial logic. Following the popular outcry, which included a four-minute long video by Fernanda Torres supporting its selection, The Secret Agent was ultimately chosen as the country official submission on 15 September.

== Accolades ==
Year	Award	Category	Nominee(s)	Result	Ref.
2026	40th Goya Awards	Best Ibero-American Film		Nominated	
2026	25th Grande Otelo Awards	Best Film		Won	
2026	25th Grande Otelo Awards	Best Director	Marianna Brennand	Won	
2026	25th Grande Otelo Awards	Best Original Screenplay	Felipe Sholl, Marcelo Grabowsky, Marianna Brennand, Carolina Benevides, Antonio Pellegrino, Camila Agustini	Won	
2026	25th Grande Otelo Awards	Best Actress	Jamilli Correa	Nominated	
2026	25th Grande Otelo Awards	Best Supporting Actress	Dira Paes	Nominated	
2026	25th Grande Otelo Awards	Best Supporting Actor	Rômulo Braga	Nominated	
2026	25th Grande Otelo Awards	Best Cinematography	Pierre de Kerchove	Nominated	
2026	25th Grande Otelo Awards	Best Editing	Isabela Monteiro de Castro	Won	
2026	25th Grande Otelo Awards	Best Art Direction	Marcos Pedroso	Nominated	
2026	25th Grande Otelo Awards	Best Costume Design	Kika Lopes	Nominated	
