= Cristina Quer Casar =

2003 film directed by Luiz Villaça

Cristina Quer Casar ('Cristina Wants to Get Married' in English) is a 2003 Brazilian film. Cine TAM, a cinema company division of the parent company of TAM Airlines, organized the presentation of the film in Medford, Massachusetts, United States in 2007.

== Plot ==
The film stars Cristina (Denise Fraga), who uses a dating agency to find Paulo. While Cristina dates Paulo the owner of the dating agency, Chico, begins to fall in love with Cristina.
