= Heavier Is the Sky =

- Promotional release poster
- Directed by: Petrus Cariry
- Written by: Petrus Cariry; Firmino Holanda; Rosemberg Cariry
- Produced by: Bárbara Cariry
- Starring: Matheus Nachtergaele; Ana Luiza Rios
- Cinematography: Petrus Cariry
- Edited by: Firmino Holanda; Petrus Cariry
- Music by: João Victor Barroso
- Production company: Iluminura Filmes
- Distributed by: Sereia Filmes
- Release date: August 14, 2023 (Gramado)
- Running time: 98 minutes
- Country: Brazil
- Language: Portuguese

Heavier Is the Sky (Portuguese: Mais Pesado é o Céu) is a 2023 Brazilian drama film directed by Petrus Cariry who co-wrote with Firmino Holanda and Rosemberg Cariry. Starring Matheus Nachtergaele and Ana Luiza Rios. It had its world premiere at the 51st Gramado Film Festival on August 14, 2023, where it competed for the Golden Kikito and was honored with the awards: Best Director, Best Cinematography, Best Editing and the Special Jury Prize for Ana Luiza Rios.

== Synopsis ==
When Teresa and Antônio find an abandoned child, the two embark on a road trip. The common past, for them, are the memories of a city submerged at the bottom of a dam. Life is a dream, but the future is uncertainty.

== Cast ==
- Matheus Nachtergaele as Antônio
- Ana Luiza Rios as Teresa
- Danny Barbosa as Letícia
- Sílvia Buarque as Fátima
- Pedro Domingues as Manager
- Galba Nogueira as Truck driver I
- Buda Lira as Zé Caminhoneiro
- Magno Carvalho as Truck driver III
- Marcos Duarte

== Production ==
Principal photography took place in 2021 in the midst of the COVID-19 pandemic in the municipalities of Quixadá and Nova Jaguaribara, between Sertão Central and Vale do Jaguaribe.

== Release ==
Heavier Is the Sky had its world premiere on August 14, 2023, at the 51st Gramado Film Festival.

== Accolades ==
| Year | Award / Festival | Category | Recipient | Result | Ref. |
|---|---|---|---|---|---|
| 2023 | Gramado Film Festival | Golden Kikito | Heavier Is the Sky | Nominated | |
| 2023 | Gramado Film Festival | Best Director | Petrus Cariry | Won | |
| 2023 | Gramado Film Festival | Best Cinematography | Petrus Cariry | Won | |
| 2023 | Gramado Film Festival | Best Editing | Firmino Holanda & Petrus Cariry | Won | |
| 2023 | Gramado Film Festival | Special Jury Prize | Ana Luiza Rios | Won | |
