= Cine TAM =

Brazilian cinema

Cine TAM was a Brazilian cinema owned by the parent company of TAM Airlines.

The cinema opened in the Morumbi Shopping in the Santo Amaro neighborhood of São Paulo on April 19, 2007. TAM took the former Cine Shopping Morumbi theater and transformed it into a TAM-branded cinema. The theater offered benefits to members of TAM Airlines's Fidelidade frequent flyer program. The advertising agency said that the four screen cinema took inspiration from the 1960s, when travel by jet aircraft increased. The theater's screens were named Londres (London), Nova York (New York City), Milão (Milan), and Paris. The theater included a restaurant called Cine Cafe TAM.

Cine TAM organized the presentation of the 2003 Brazilian film Cristina Quer Casar in Medford, Massachusetts, United States in 2007.

Cine TAM was closed on October 30, 2012.
