= Tim Maia (film) =

2014 directed film by Mauro Lima

- Theatrical release poster
- Directed by: Mauro Lima
- Written by: Mauro Lima; Antonia Pellegrino
- Based on: Vale Tudo - O Som e a Fúria de Tim Maia by Nelson Motta
- Produced by: Rômulo Marinho Jr. Rodrigo Teixeira
- Starring: Robson Nunes; Babu Santana; Alinne Moraes; Cauã Reymond; Valdineia Soriano; George Sauma; Tito Naville
- Cinematography: Ulisses Malta Jr. Eduardo Miranda
- Music by: Berna Ceppas
- Production companies: RT Features; Globo Filmes
- Distributed by: Downtown Filmes
- Release date: October 30, 2014 (Brazil)
- Country: Brazil
- Languages: Portuguese; English

Tim Maia is a 2014 Brazilian biographical drama film based on the book Vale Tudo - O Som e a Fúria de Tim Maia by Nelson Motta, about the life of Brazilian musician Tim Maia. It is co-written and directed by Mauro Lima, and starring Robson Nunes, Babu Santana, Alinne Moraes, Cauã Reymond, Valdineia Soriano, George Sauma and Tito Naville.

The film follows the trajectory of one of the most beloved and respected artists of Brazilian music, from his humble origins to the most successful period of his career as a performer, going through transitions like the trip he took to New York City without money and without speaking a word of English.

== Cast ==
- Robson Nunes as Tim Maia
- Babu Santana as Tim Maia
- Alinne Moraes as Janaína
- Cauã Reymond Fábio
- Valdineia Soriano as Dona Maria
- George Sauma as Roberto Carlos
- Tito Naville as Erasmo Carlos
- Luis Lobianco as Carlos Imperial
- Laila Zaid as Susi
- Marco Sorriso as Cromado
- Ephraim Benton as Bengy
- Blake Rice as Max
- Michael Tomlinson as Mr O'Meara
- Charlie Covey as Doug
- John Reese as Cornelius
- Pollyanna Rocha as Patricia
- Joya Bravo as Aretha
- André Dale as Wellington
- Bryan Ruffo as Valcir Ribeiro
- Bernardo Mendes as Dito
