= Julio Sumiu =

2014 film directed by Roberto Berliner

- Theatrical release poster
- Directed by: Roberto Berliner
- Written by: Patrícia Andrade; Vitor Leite; Beto Silva
- Starring: Lília Cabral; Carolina Dieckmann; Fiuk; Augusto Madeira; Stepan Nercessian
- Cinematography: Pedro Sotero; Fabricio Tadeu
- Edited by: Pedro Bronz
- Music by: Plínio Profeta
- Production company: TV Zero
- Distributed by: Imagem Filmes
- Release date: 17 April 2014 (Brazil)
- Running time: 100 minutes
- Country: Brazil
- Language: Portuguese
- Budget: R$ 5 million

Julio Sumiu is a 2014 Brazilian comedy film directed by Roberto Berliner based on the novel of the same name by Beto Silva.

== Cast ==
- Lília Cabral as Edna
- Carolina Dieckmann as Madá
- Fiuk as Silvio
- Augusto Madeira as J. Rui
- Stepan Nercessian as Delegado Barriga
- Leandro Firmino as Tião Demônio
- Pedro Nercessian as Julio
- Hugo Grativol as Zeca
- Dudu Sandroni as Eustáquio
- Babu Santana as Caolha
