= Rat Fever =

2012 film directed by Cláudio Assis

- Film poster
- Portuguese: Febre do Rato
- Directed by: Cláudio Assis
- Written by: Hilton Lacerda
- Produced by: Cláudio Assis; Marcello Ludwig Maia; Julia Moraes
- Distributed by: Imovision
- Release dates: 14 July 2011 (Paulínia); 22 June 2012 (Brazil)
- Running time: 110 minutes
- Country: Brazil
- Language: Portuguese

Rat Fever (Portuguese: Febre do Rato) is a 2011 Brazilian film directed by Claudio Assis.

The film premiered at the 2011 Paulínia Festival, where it won Best Film and seven other awards. It also showed at the 2012 International Film Festival Rotterdam. It also won São Paulo Association of Art Critics Award for Best Picture in 2012 and the Havana Star Prize for Best Film (Fiction) at the 2013 Havana Film Festival New York.

== Cast ==
- Ângela Leal as Dona Marieta
- Conceição Camarotti as Dona Anja
- Hugo Gila as Bira
- Irandhir Santos as Zizo
- Juliano Cazarré as Boca
- Maria Gladys as Stella Maris
- Mariana Nunes as Rosângela
- Matheus Nachtergaele as Paizinho
- Nanda Costa as Eneida
- Tânia Granussi as Vanessa
- Vitor Araújo as Oncinha
- Johnny Hooker as Zizo's Brother
