= Jonas Bloch =

Brazilian actor (born 1939)

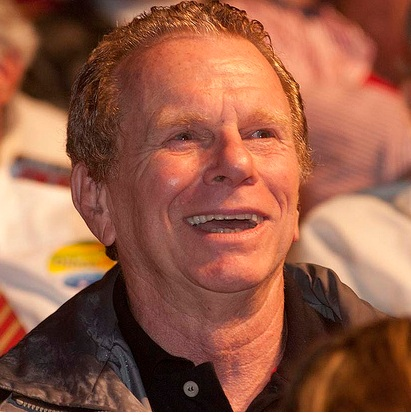
- Jonas Bloch in 2010
- Born: February 8, 1939 (age 87); Belo Horizonte, Minas Gerais, Brazil
- Occupation: Actor
- Years active: 1958–present
- Children: Débora Bloch

Jonas Bloch (born February 8, 1939) is a Brazilian actor. Most known for his television roles as villains, Bloch is descendant of Ukrainian-Jewish people and father of actress Débora Bloch.

== Selected filmography ==
- Quilombo (1984)
- Avaete, Seed of Revenge (1985)
- The Man in the Black Cape (1986)
- Top Model (1989)
- Mulheres de Areia (1993)
- A Viagem (1994)
- Tropicaliente (1994)
- Irmãos Coragem (1995)
- Malhação (1998)
- O Circo das Qualidades Humanas (2000)
- Woman on Top (2000)
- Mango Yellow (2002)
- O Quinto dos Infernos (2002)
- Jamais Te Esquecerei (2003)
- A Lei e o Crime (2009)
- Bela, a Feia (2009)
- Vitória (2014)
- Bom Sucesso (2019)
- Elas por Elas (2023)
