= Mango Yellow =

2002 film by Cláudio Assis

- Theatrical release poster
- Portuguese: Amarelo Manga
- Directed by: Cláudio Assis
- Written by: Hilton Lacerda
- Produced by: Cláudio Assis; Paulo Sacramento
- Starring: Matheus Nachtergaele; Jonas Bloch; Dira Paes; Chico Díaz; Leona Cavalli
- Cinematography: Walter Carvalho
- Edited by: Paulo Sacramento
- Music by: Jorge du Peixe Lúcio Maia
- Production companies: Parabólica Brasil; Olhos de Cão; Labocine; Quanta
- Distributed by: RioFilme
- Release dates: October 4, 2002 (Festival do Rio); August 15, 2003 (theatrical release)
- Running time: 100 minutes
- Country: Brazil
- Language: Portuguese
- Budget: R$450,000
- Box office: R$769,750

Mango Yellow (Portuguese: Amarelo Manga) is a 2002 Brazilian drama film directed by Cláudio Assis. It stars Matheus Nachtergaele, Jonas Bloch, Dira Paes, Chico Díaz, and Leona Cavalli as working-class people who engage in amorous and social encounters, with most of the action taking place in a hotel and a bar. The directorial debut of Assis, the film was partially inspired by his previous short film Texas Hotel. It was filmed on a low budget in the suburbs of Pernambuco.

Mango Yellow received several awards at various film festivals, both in Brazil and abroad, including Festival de Brasília and the Berlin Film Festival. The film was generally praised by domestic reviewers for its characters, soundtrack, cinematography, and depictions of Brazil. Brazilian Film Critics Association selected it as one of the best Brazilian films of all time, while English-speaking critics were more mixed in their response.

== Plot ==
The film opens with Lígia, a barmaid who is fed up with her grueling routine and who is forced to routinely turn down the sexual propositions of the bar's customers. One of the men who hits on Lígia is Isaac, a necrophiliac who enjoys sodomizing corpses and drinking their blood. He lives at the Texas Hotel, where Dunga, a gay man, works as a handyman. Dunga is attracted to Wellington, a butcher who delivers meat to the hotel. Wellington, however, is married to Kika, a woman who is proud to be an evangelical Christian. However, Wellington cheats on his wife with a woman named Dayse. Dayse tires of being Wellington's mistress and tells Dunga about the relationship.

Dunga anonymously reveals to Kika that her husband is cheating on her, thinking that if he can destroy their marriage, then he and Wellington can become lovers. Kika finds Wellington and Dayse together, attacks them, and then leaves for good. Wellington goes to the Texas Hotel to seek solace. Dunga wants to take Wellington up to his room, but Wellington is put off by the funeral of the recently deceased owner of the hotel. Meanwhile, Isaac is thrown out of the bar after trying to forcibly grab Lígia. He is then seen driving his car and when he meets Kika, he takes her to his apartment and they have sex. As the film concludes, Lígia is shown again complaining about her routine. This is followed by a montage of everyday city life, ending with Kika deciding to dye her hair in mango yellow, the same shade that made Isaac so attracted to Lígia.

== Cast ==
- Matheus Nachtergaele as Dunga
- Jonas Bloch as Isaac
- Dira Paes as Kika
- Chico Díaz as Wellington
- Leona Cavalli as Lígia
- Conceição Camarotti as Aurora
- Cosme Prezado Soares as Bianor
- Everaldo Pontes as Rabecão
- Magdale Alves as Dayse (or Daisy)
- Jones Melo as priest

== Themes ==
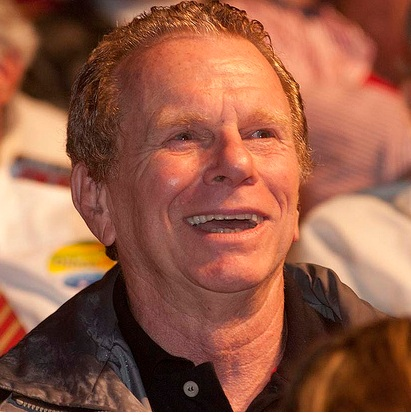
Bloch's character is an example of how Assis tried to make the film "poetic and violent at the same time."

Writing for The New York Times, Stephen Holden interpreted the film's message as follows: "This is how the lower half lives in Brazil, and by extension, humanity at its most basic, getting along without the rose-colored protections that affluence affords." As it deals with these kinds of themes, the film was labeled as "violent". In response, Assis said that he "films life as it is". Jose Solis of PopMatters declared that "despite its sorrowful appearance, the film is a celebration of life". Assis tried to contrast the violence depicted by the Hollywood action films with the "small violences" which people face everyday, making it "poetic and violent at the same time". Bloch's character shooting corpses represents "a harmless, symbolic addiction" in the same way other aspects of the film "come from it, this violence within us".

Writing in The New Yorker, Michael Sragow said that "The human content ... is the stuff of art-house exploitation." IstoÉ Gente's Domingas Person wrote that the phrase "the human being is stomach and sex", which is said by the priest in the film, is an apt summary of the film's "spirit". Writing in Diário de Pernambuco, Luciana Veras declared that the film "talk[s] about the excluded [people] who also crave the same as the characters in the [tele]novela[s], from Hollywood films or French novels: love and happiness". Assis criticized the fact that several directors like to "glamorize poverty," and as such, he characterized his characters to show the people's vice. José Geraldo Couto of Folha de S. Paulo wrote that the film shows that "the miserable are not dear waiting for the mercy of others, but are full of life, willing to kill or die to fulfill their desires and instincts". Deborah Young of Variety opined that the mango yellow color represents both "the jaundiced shade of their broken dreams" and their sense "of nonconformity and feeling alive."

== Background and production ==
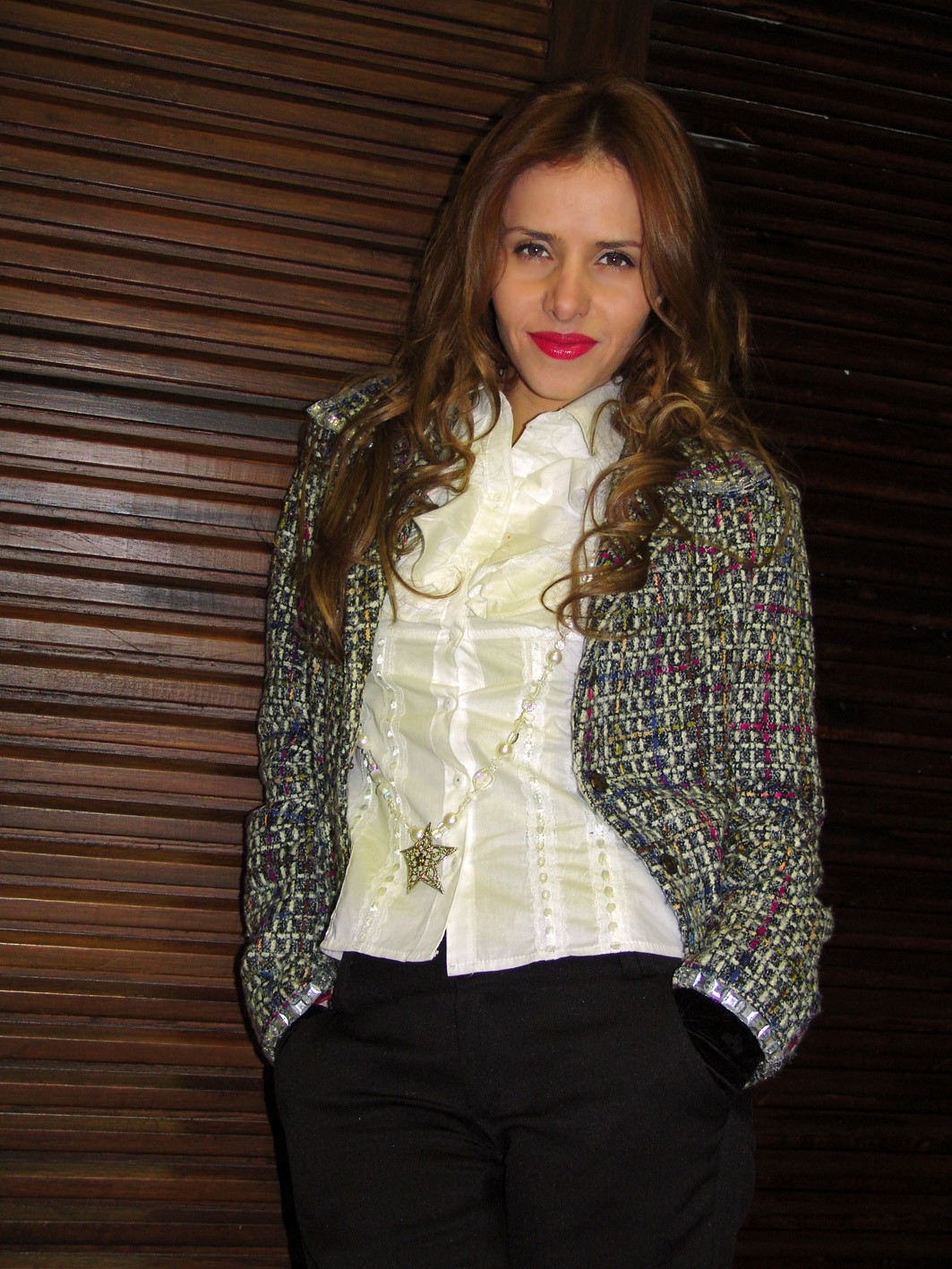
One of Assis's first ideas for the film led to a scene in which Cavalli (pictured) appears nude.

Prior to Mango Yellow, Cláudio Assis worked as a production director on the 1996 film Perfumed Ball and as director on three short films. One of them, Texas Hotel, served as an inspiration to Mango Yellow; Alessandro Giannini of O Estado de S. Paulo said Texas Hotel is "a kind of 'privileged test' of Mango Yellow", while TV Guide's Ken Fox described Mango Yellow as an "expanded version" of Hotel Texas. Couto wrote that the "gratuitous series of aberrations" presented in Texas Hotel was turned into an "articulate narrative and full of meaning".

The production cost was R$450,000. Assis was happy with this, noting that Brazilian films cost an average of R$3 million at the time. The filming took place in the suburbs of the cities of Recife and Olinda, both in the state of Pernambuco. It was shot with 35 mm cameras brought from São Paulo and Rio de Janeiro, and filming took place in five weeks between September and October 2001.

One of the first ideas Assis had for the film was to show the mons pubis of a waitress he knew. Though he was unsure how to include this element, the yellow-colored pubic hair matched the book Tempo Amarelo ("Yellow Time"), by sociologist Renato Carneiro Campos. The title of the film was borrowed from the book, in which the author describes the "rotten teeth of children, the color of poverty in the country". Assis wanted to create a film to show "the face of the Brazilian people. We are from the Third World and we need to look at ourselves".

== Release ==
Mango Yellow's premiere was held at the Festival do Rio on October 4, 2002, while it was released on domestic theaters on August 15, 2003. Despite receiving praise by film critics, it was moderately received by Brazilian audiences. Mango Yellow grossed R$769,750, with a viewership of 129,021 people in the sixteen Brazilian theaters in which it was shown, representing the twelfth largest audience for a domestic film in 2003.

=== Accolades ===
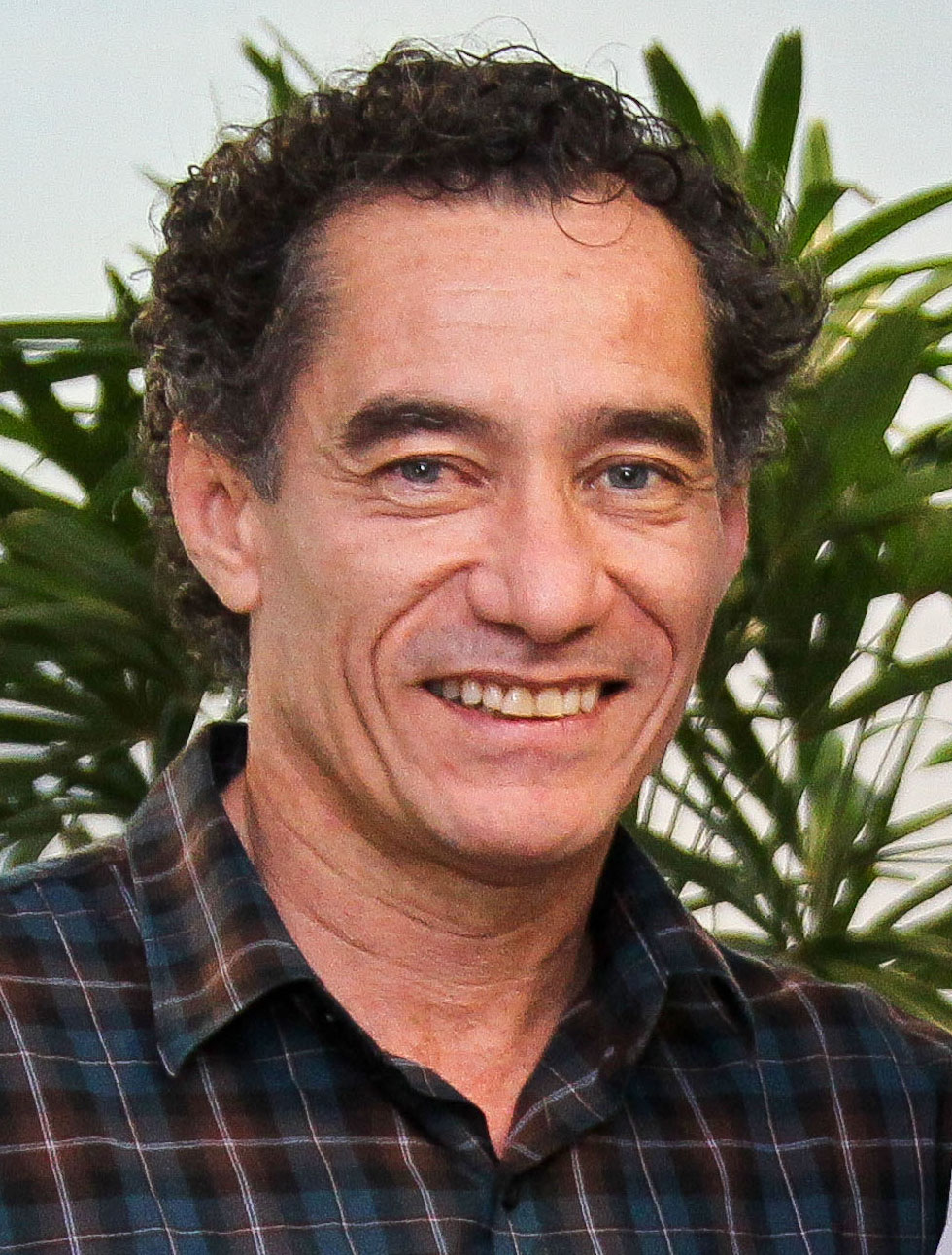
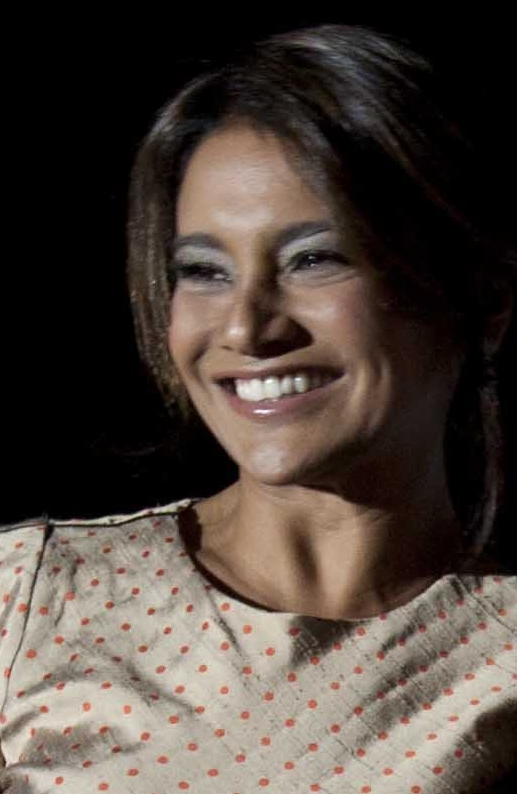
Both Diaz (left) and Paes won awards for their performances

At the 35th Festival de Brasília, Mango Yellow was selected as Best Film by the official jury, the popular jury, and critics alike; it also received the awards for Best Cinematography, Best Editing, Best Cast, and Best Actor (Díaz). Assis won the award for Best Debut Film at the 25th Havana Film Festival, where the film also won the award for Best Cinematography. It also won for Best Cinematography at the Seventh Brazilian Film Festival of Miami. Mango Yellow won in every feature film category at the 13th Cine Ceará—Best Film, Best Director, Best Cinematography, Best Screenplay, Best Art Direction, Best Original Score, Best Actor (for Nachtergaele), and Best Actress (for Paes)—and also received a special prize for its costume design. Although nominated in 13 categories at the 2004 Grande Prêmio do Cinema Brasileiro, it only won for Best Cinematography. At the 53rd Berlin International Film Festival, it won the award for Best Film in the Forum section, and received the Grand Prix at the 15th Toulouse Latin America Film Festival. It was also nominated for the Ariel Award for Best Ibero-American Film.

=== Critical reception ===
The film received generally positive reviews in Brazil. The characters, the actor performances, and the soundtrack were praised by Person and Veras, with Veras noting that the film's characterizations avoided stereotypes. The film's cinematography was praised by Person and Veras as well as by Marcelo Hessel from Omelete and Alcino Leite Netto from Folha de S. Paulo, with Netto appreciating that the imagery was neither "decorative" nor "spare", but a part of the film. The film's depiction of real life in Brazil was praised by Hessel and Veras, with both of them commenting that City of God is "cosmeticized" if compared to Mango Yellow, and the Hessel stating that Mango Yellow is "a testimony of documentary and sociological value". Cinepop critic Andrea Don declared it a film that viewers would either love or hate, concluding that "you will not leave the cinema's room the same as you entered". In 2015, it was recognized by the Brazilian Film Critics Association as the 86th best Brazilian film of all time on its Top 100.

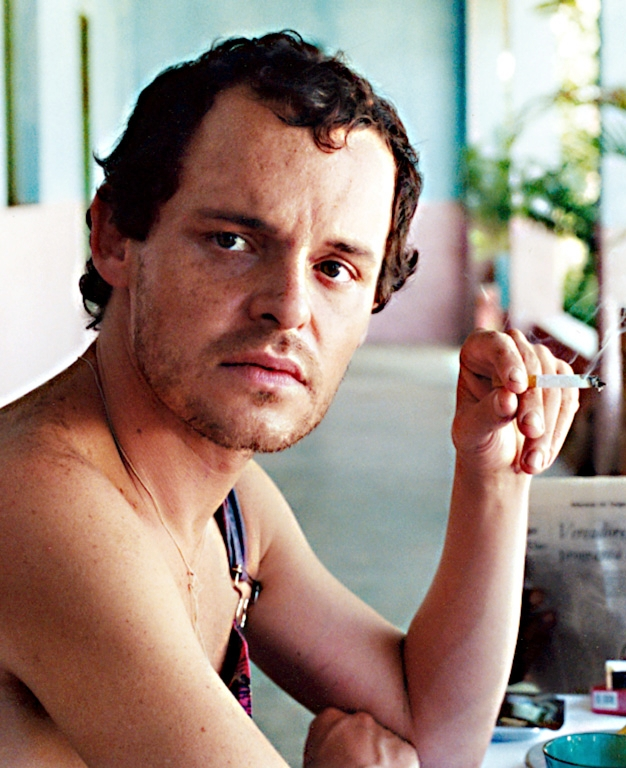
Deborah Young of Variety said that Nachtergaele (pictured) "is a standout" in the film.

Mango Yellow received mixed reviews from English-speaking reviewers. On review aggregation website Rotten Tomatoes, the film has a 60% rating based on five reviews, with an average score of 5.6/10. On Metacritic, which assigns a normalised rating out of 100 based on reviews from critics, the film has a score of 40 (indicating "mixed or average reviews") based on five reviews. A The Village Voice reviewer described the characters as "babbling caricatures" and the film as a "shallow Brazilian trifle". Young called Nachtergaele a "standout" as "He embodies the film's savage over-the-topness without flattening out as some of the other characters do." Although praising its cinematography, Keith Phipps of The A.V. Club said it is "a film that has nothing to say". Sragow, Young, and Fox also praised cinematographer Carvalho's work; Fox said it is "[t]awdry stuff ... but it's glorious to look at". In Sragow's opinion, the penultimate scene—the montage—"boasts an eloquence that eclipses everything else in the movie". Holden found the characters to be "robust, full-dimensional people" and praised the film's "surreal flavor". Solis praised it, saying "the real pleasure" in the film is that Assis "doesn't recur to exploitation to make these people memorable".

=== Home media ===
The film was released on DVD in Brazil by Califórnia Filmes in 2004, while in the United States it was released by First Run Features in partnership with Global Film Initiative on the "Global Lens 2004/2003" series in 2005, and re-released on "The Best of Global Lens: Brazil" in 2011.
