= Bog of Beasts =

2006 film by Cláudio Assis

- Theatrical release poster
- Portuguese: Baixio das Bestas
- Directed by: Cláudio Assis
- Written by: Hilton Lacerda
- Produced by: Cláudio Assis; Júlia Moraes
- Starring: Mariah Teixeira; Fernando Teixeira; Matheus Nachtergaele; Caio Blat; Dira Paes; Marcélia Cartaxo; Hermila Guedes; João Ferreira; Conceição Camarotti; Magdale Alves; Irandhir Santos; China; Samuel Vieira
- Cinematography: Walter Carvalho
- Edited by: Karen Harley
- Music by: Pupillo
- Production company: Parabólica Brasil
- Distributed by: Imovision
- Release dates: 27 November 2006 (Brasília); 11 May 2007 (Brazil)
- Running time: 80 minutes
- Country: Brazil
- Language: Portuguese

Bog of Beasts (Portuguese: Baixio das Bestas) is a 2006 Brazilian drama film directed by Cláudio Assis. The film premiered on 27 November 2006 at the 39th Brasília Film Festival, where it won six awards, including Best Picture. It was released theatrically in Brazil on 11 May 2007 by Imovision.

== Plot ==
In the rural Brazilian sugarcane town known as Baixio das Bestas (Bog of Beasts), Auxiliadora is a 16-year old girl living with her grandfather Seu Heitor. Auxiliadora is a result of an incestuous relationship between Heitor and his daughter, Auxiliadora's mother, who fled years earlier. Heitor is cruel and abusive to Auxiliadora, forcing her to work doing chores such as cooking and cleaning during the day to earn money. On some nights he takes her to the nearby town's local gas station where he forces her to stand naked behind a church. Truck drivers from the gas station and others are allowed to pleasure themselves while looking at Auxiliadora standing nude provided they pay Heitor.

One night a young man, Cicero, pays Heitor to watch Auxiliadora and becomes obsessed with her. Cicero comes from a moderately wealthy middle class family and hangs out with a group of other privileged young men led by Everardo. Everardo, Cicero and their friends spend their days embarking on drunken debauchery, drinking and visiting a local brothel run by Dona Margarida. Dona Margarida's brothel employs Ceica, Bela and Dora. Dona Margarida informs them that Everardo and his group have scheduled a "party" at the brothel that night. Bela expresses her dislike for Everardo and Cicero's group, finding Everardo to be cruel and sadistic. Bela tells Dora and Ceica that she would like to meet a kind old man willing to marry her and give her a home. Dora mocks Bela's desire, saying no one would want a prostitute for a wife.

Heitor has paid a local laborer Maninho to dig a cesspool for his house. Maninho expresses interest in Auxiliadora, flirting with her and inviting her dancing. Auxiliadora is shy but seems to appreciate the attention. Heitor notices Maninho's interest in Auxiliadora and warns her to stay away from him, admonishing her to not follow her mother's footsteps. He then strives to keep Maninho from seeing Auxiliadora, including berating him when he shows up drunk in the daytime demanding to talk to Auxiliadora. After another night of Auxiliadora being displayed nude by Heitor, Cicero drives past the two as they wait for a van to take them home. Cicero invites Auxiliadora to get into his car, offending Heitor, who swears at Cicero. Cicero drives off after exchanging insults with Heitor.

At the "party" at Dona Margarida's brothel, Cicero tells Everardo he wants to have sex with Auxiliadora, and insults Heitor for pimping out his own granddaughter. Everardo begins to grope several of the prostitutes, and begins to forcefully undress Bela, who resists him. Everardo eventually drags Bela to the bedroom and brutally rapes her while the other prostitutes and his friends cheer him on. After raping her Everardo stomps on Bela's head, severely injuring her. The next weekend, Dora and Ceica reminisce gleefully about Everardo raping and beating Bela. Dora leaves the brothel after an argument with Dona Margarida. She is encountered by Everardo and his friends, who pick her up and take her to the cinema, a location Ceica and Bela had warned Dora against going. At the cinema Everardo and two others sexually assault Dora, with Everardo sodomizing her with a club, before leaving her behind. Heitor sends Auxiliadora alone one night to town to display herself nude with the help of the gas station owner, Dona Maria. Dona Maria allows the spectators to grope Auxiliadora for an extra fee. Afterwards Cicero sees Auxiliadora waiting alone for the van. He kidnaps her at gunpoint before driving her to a field and raping her.

Auxiliadora flees back home after her assault. Heitor sees her condition and realizes what's happened. He begins cursing her for being promiscuous and tries to beat her, causing her to flee. After a group of maracatu dancers barge into Heitor's house, causing him to seemingly suffer a heart attack. Afterwards Maninho and Heitor's friend Mario from the village discuss the aftermath of the events. Heitor is revealed to be dying in a coma, with Auxiliadora moving to town, working as a prostitute at the gas station with Dona Maria caring for her. Mario comments that he would be willing to make Auxiliadora his wife and provide her a home. At the end of their discussion, the two men comment on how the rain seems to only be getting worse.

== Cast ==
- Mariah Teixeira as Auxiliadora
- Fernando Teixeira as Seu Heitor
- Caio Blat as Cícero
- Matheus Nachtergaele as Everardo
- Dira Paes as Bela
- Marcélia Cartaxo as Ceiça
- Hermila Guedes as Dora
- Conceição Camarotti as Dona Margarida
- João Ferreira as Mestre Mário
- Irandhir Santos as Maninho
- China as Cilinho
- Samuel Vieira as Esdras

== Accolades ==
Award	Year	Category	Recipient(s)	Result	Ref(s)
Festival de Brasília	2006	Best Film	Bog of Beasts	Won	
Festival de Brasília	2006	Best Actress	Mariah Teixeira	Won	
Festival de Brasília	2006	Best Supporting Actor	Irandhir Santos	Won	
Festival de Brasília	2006	Best Supporting Actress	Dira Paes	Won	
Festival de Brasília	2006	Best Music	Pupillo	Won	
Festival de Brasília	2006	Critics Award	Bog of Beasts	Won	
Rotterdam International Film Festival	2007	Tiger Award	Bog of Beasts	Won	
Mar del Plata International Film Festival	2007	Latin American Competition – Best Feature Film	Bog of Beasts	Nominated	
Cinema Brazil Grand Prize	2008	Best Picture	Cláudio Assis, Júlia Moraes and João Vieira Jr.	Nominated	
Cinema Brazil Grand Prize	2008	Best Actor	Matheus Nachtergaele	Nominated	
Cinema Brazil Grand Prize	2008	Best Actress	Dira Paes	Nominated	
Cinema Brazil Grand Prize	2008	Best Supporting Actress	Hermila Guedes	Nominated	
Cinema Brazil Grand Prize	2008	Best Supporting Actress	Marcelia Cartaxo	Nominated	
Cinema Brazil Grand Prize	2008	Best Editing – Fiction	Karen Harley	Nominated	
