= Get the Goat =

2021 Brazilian film

- Netflix release poster
- Portuguese: Cabras da Peste
- Directed by: Vitor Brandt
- Written by: Vitor Brandt; Denis Nielsen
- Starring: Victor Allen; Evelyn Castro; Juliano Cazarré; Matheus Nachtergaele
- Distributed by: Netflix
- Release date: March 18, 2021
- Running time: 97 minutes
- Country: Brazil
- Language: Portuguese

Get the Goat (Portuguese: Cabras da Peste) is a 2021 Brazilian action comedy film directed by Vitor Brandt, written by Vitor Brandt and Denis Nielsen and starring Victor Allen, Evelyn Castro, Juliano Cazarré and Matheus Nachtergaele. The film is streaming on Netflix.

== Plot ==
A badass cop, Bruce from Guará, loses a goat named Celestine. A drug trafficker takes Celestine to São Paulo and Bruce follows him. Assisted by a desk duty, violence-fearing cop, Trindade, Bruce not only finds the goat but also uncovers an underground drug lord named White Glove.

== Cast ==
- Victor Allen
- Evelyn Castro
- Juliano Cazarré
- Falcão
- Edmilson Filho as Bruceuilis
- Soren Hellerup as Sergio Petrov
- Letícia Lima
- Renan Medeiros
- Matheus Nachtergaele as Trindade
- Eyrio Okura
- Leandro Ramos
- Jéssica Tamochunas
- Valéria Vitoriano

== Release ==
The film was digitally released on March 18, 2021 by Netflix.
