= Falcão – Meninos do Tráfico =

2006 film by MV Bill

Falcão - Meninos do Tráfico
- Directed by: MV Bill, Celso Athayde
- Produced by: MV Bill, Celso Athayde, Central Única das Favelas
- Starring: MV Bill
- Music by: MV Bill
- Release date: 2006
- Running time: 58 minutes
- Country: Brazil
- Language: Portuguese

Falcão – Meninos do Tráfico (English: Falcon: Drug Trafficking’s Boys) is a Brazilian documentary television film directed by rapper MV Bill and Celso Athayde, and associate produced by Central Única das Favelas, about the life of young favela dwellers who work with drug trafficking.

The documentary was recorded between 1998 and 2006, when the producers visited various poor communities in Brazil. During the recordings the two producers had to face the hostile environment where the boys lived.

The name of the documentary comes from the term "falcão" (falcon) used in the slums to refer to the lookouts who keep watch over the community and inform when the police or a rival group approaches.

The film gained special attention after it was transmitted by Rede Globo, the largest television network in the country, in its popular weekly TV show Fantástico.
