= Antônia (film) =

2006 film directed by Tata Amaral

- Theatrical poster
- Directed by: Tata Amaral
- Written by: Tata Amaral; Roberto Moreira
- Produced by: Tata Amaral; Geórgia Costa Araújo; Guel Arraes (associate); Andrea Barata Ribeiro (co-producer); Bel Berlinck (co-producer); Fernando Meirelles (co-producer); Moa Ramalho (executive)
- Starring: Negra Li; Cindy Mendes; Leilah Moreno; Quelynah; Sandra de Sá
- Cinematography: Jacob Solitrenick
- Edited by: Idê Lacreta
- Music by: Beto Villares
- Production company: Coração da Selva Transmídia
- Distributed by: Downtown Filmes
- Release dates: September 8, 2006 (TIFF); February 9, 2007
- Running time: 90 minutes
- Country: Brazil
- Language: Portuguese
- Budget: R$1.3–2 million
- Box office: R$600,698

Antônia is a 2006 Brazilian drama musical film which tells the story of Antônia, an Afro-Brazilian hip-hop girl group formed by four young women living on a favela of São Paulo. On their way to the mainstream success, they have to face with the violence near their homes and the sexism of the musical business. The film was directed by Tata Amaral and stars Negra Li, Cindy Mendes, Leilah Moreno and Quelynah as the members of the group.

It was shot in Santo André, São Paulo. The film had its European premiere January 26, 2007 at the 36th Rotterdam International Film Festival, in the section "Cinema of the World: Time & Tide". It was released commercially in the United States on September 21, 2007, in New York City, New York; Newark, New Jersey, and Los Angeles, California.

The movie, spun off from a 2006 short by Amaral, in turn spun off a television series from 02 Filmes and Rede Globo in the filmmaker's native Brazil, starring the same actors in the same roles.

== Plot ==
On Vila Brasilândia, a favela (shanty town) of São Paulo, four Afro-Brazilian girls battle to fulfill their dream of making a living off their music. Friends since the childhood, Preta (Negra Li), Bárbarah (Leilah Moreno), Mayah (Quelynah) and Lena (Cindy Mendes, a.k.a. Maria Madalena, as Cindy) quit singing the backing vocals for a male rap group and form Antônia, their own group. Discovered by the smooth-talking manager Marcelo Diamante (Thaíde), they begin to sing rap, MPB, pop and soul in bars and in middle-class parties.

Preta is the deep-voiced mother of a young daughter, Emília (Nathalye Cris). Mayah is the most sexually provocative though single and the high-voiced Lena lives alone with her boyfriend. Bárbarah is the sister of Duda (Chico Santo), an athletic young man with whom she frequently practices martial arts. Duda's exposed homosexuality brings a rising action into the story in which his gay partner is killed by a gang and Duda himself injured. Duda, however, recovers; despite this sudden crisis, the future begins to look bright again as the band Antônia begins to take flight.

Just when the dream of the quartet seems to becoming true, their hopes are dashed by daily events, such as poverty, male oppression, and further street violence, which threaten the group and place the young women's friendship in jeopardy.

The conflict begins when Mayah flirts with Preta's estranged husband Ermano (Fernando Macário), and Preta forces Mayah out of the group, deciding to raise Emília by herself with the help of her parents. Next, Lena reveals that she is pregnant and must quit the group after her boyfriend, who originally wanted an abortion, puts pressure on her to do so if they are to raise the child. Bárbarah, meanwhile, is walking home one night with Preta when she is confronted and harassed by a young member of the same gang who attacked her brother; she defends herself using martial arts, throwing him heavily to the ground and resulting in his hospitalization. The boy dies in the hospital and Bárbarah is arrested and imprisoned for manslaughter.

Preta, who struggles with her own personal troubles and the strain of raising her child alone, is the final member of Antônia left. At last unable to feel any desire to continue the group or rise to fame (as Marcelo encourages) if her friends cannot be with her, she goes to Mayah's house to apologize and reconcile. They, along with Lena, visit a grateful, teary-eyed Bárbarah in prison; they decide to spend their time with her writing a song about their experiences.

The scene changes to some point in the future in which all four members of Antônia are back together, singing onstage a liberation-themed song, Antônia.

== Cast ==
The cast includes real-life Brazilian rap singers Negra Li and Thaide; black-music singer Leilah Moreno; actress, MC, and free style rapper Cindy, and rapper-dancer Quelynah. Appearing in one scene each, as Preta's parents, are Sandra de Sá, "the leading lady of Brazilian funk", and Thobias da Vai-Vai, a leading samba performer.

- Preta - Negra Li
- Lena - Cindy Mendes, a.k.a. Maria Madalena (as Cindy)
- Barbarah - Leilah Moreno
- Mayah - Quelynah
- Dante - Marcus Vinicius Kamau
- DJ Anjo - DJ Negro Rico
- DJ Cocão - DJ Hadji
- Marcelo Diamante - Thaíde
- Apresentador show - Adielson Bonam
- Ermano - Fernando Macário
- Eduardo "Duda" de Souza - Chico Santo
- JP - Maionezi
- Robinho - Ezequiel Da Silva
- Emília - Nathalye Cris
- Grupo Black Gero - Black Gero, Bira Black, DJ Celo
- M.C. Brasilândia - Max B.O.
- Z'Africa Brasil - M.C. Gaspar, Fernandinho Beat Box, Funk Buia, Dj Tano, Pitcho
- Coral Evangélico - Paola Lúcio, Carmelita Moren, Creuza Vangelista, André Mota, Nestor, Paixão De Jesus, Patrick Rocha
- Mãe De Preta - Sandra de Sá
- Pai De Preta - Thobias da Vai-Vai
- Barão - Barão H.C.
- Hot-Dog vendor- Luana A-T.A.L.
- Noivo - Júlio Machado
- Roberta - Odara Carvalho
- Doctor - Cláudio Galperin
- Musician – Silveira
- Zé - Valnei Damacena
- Talarico - Hébano
- Taxi Driver - Zenóbio Fernandes

== Reception ==
The film received mostly positive reviews from most film critics. The review aggregator website Rotten Tomatoes reports a 93% "fresh" with an average rating of 7.4/10 based on 15 reviews. The New York Times wrote that the film "explores cultural and sexual oppression with sensitivity and verve. The story may lack complexity, but it is loaded with irrepressible energy and a deep appreciation of female friendship". Variety called it, "less a candy-coated inspirational pill and more a piece of solid dramatic fiction".
