= Chico Xavier (film) =

2010 film by Daniel Filho

- Directed by: Daniel Filho
- Written by: Marcos Bernstein
- Produced by: Claudia Bejarano; Daniel Filho; Júlio Uchoa
- Starring: Nelson Xavier; Ângelo Antônio; Christiane Torloni; Giulia Gam; Letícia Sabatella; Giovanna Antonelli
- Cinematography: Nonato Estrela
- Edited by: Diana Vasconcellos
- Production company: Lereby Productions
- Distributed by: Columbia Pictures
- Release date: 2 April 2010
- Running time: 124 minutes
- Country: Brazil
- Language: Portuguese

Chico Xavier is a 2010 Brazilian drama film directed by Daniel Filho, written by Marcos Bernstein, and starring Nelson Xavier, Christiane Torloni, Giulia Gam, Letícia Sabatella, Giovanna Antonelli and Tony Ramos. It was released in Brazil on April 2, 2010. The movie is a biography of the Brazilian medium Chico Xavier.

== Cast ==
- Nelson Xavier as Chico Xavier (1969 to 1975)
- Ângelo Antônio as Chico Xavier (1931 to 1959)
- Matheus Costa as Chico Xavier (1918 to 1922)
- Tony Ramos as Orlando
- Christiane Torloni as Glória
- Giulia Gam as Rita
- Letícia Sabatella as Maria
- Luís Melo Melo as João Cândido
- Pedro Paulo Rangel as Father Scarzelo
- Giovanna Antonelli as Cidália
- André Dias as Emmanuel
- Paulo Goulart as Saulo Guimarães
- Cássia Kis as Iara
- Cássio Gabus Mendes as Father Julio Maria
- Rosi Campos as Cleide
- Carla Daniel as Carmosina
