= Something in the Air (2002 film) =

2002 film directed by Helvécio Ratton

- Theatrical release poster
- Directed by: Helvécio Ratton
- Written by: Helvécio Ratton; Jorge Durán
- Produced by: Simone Magalhães Matos
- Starring: Alexandre Moreno; Adolfo Moura; Babu Santana; Benjamin Abras
- Cinematography: José Tadeu Ribeiro
- Edited by: Mair Tavares
- Music by: Gil Amancio
- Production company: Quimera Filmes
- Distributed by: Imagem Filmes
- Release date: September 6, 2002
- Running time: 92 minutes
- Country: Brazil
- Language: Portuguese
- Budget: R$1.75–1.8 million
- Box office: R$153,644

Something in the Air (Portuguese: Uma Onda no Ar) is a 2002 Brazilian drama film directed by Helvécio Ratton. It is based on the actual history about Rádio Favela, a community radio broadcaster established in Aglomerado da Serra, a favela of Belo Horizonte in the 1980s. It shows how it was persecuted by the police while four friends try to keep the radio. Alexandre Moreno, Adolfo Moura, Babu Santana and Benjamim Abras were chosen to star the film after 3,000 people tried for their roles. It was shot in Aglomerado da Serra and used about 300 of the local people as extras.

== Cast ==
- Alexandre Moreno as Jorge
- Adolfo Moura as Zequiel
- Babu Santana as Roque
- Benjamim Abras as Brau
- Priscila Dias as Fátima
- Edyr de Castro as Neusa
- Tião D'Ávilla as police officer
- Hamilton Borges Walê as Baiano
- Renata Otto as Lídia

== Reception ==
Something in the Air won the Jury Special Award and Alexandre Moreno was award the Best Actor at the 2002 Gramado Film Festival. It won a Special Mention in the Best Ibero-American Film category at the 2003 Miami International Film Festival. In addition to these awards, the film was also well received by critics. American Film Institute's magazine AFI Preview praised the "charismatic performances" and its "terrific photography and music." Mariane Morisawa of IstoÉ Gente and José Geraldo Couto of Folha de S. Paulo called it a counterpart of Fernando Meirelles' City of God as it focuses on the good things of a favela in opposition to the violence depicted in Meirelles' film. Morisawa praised the actors but labeled its screenplay and editing "somewhat loose" which makes it "just nice" and "dilutes the strength of its message." Although he praised its music, Couto stated that it fails with its dialogues and supporting cast. He claimed that City of God may triumph over Something in the Air in technical aspects but that that only served to hide its "moral emptiness"; Couto would like to see a film that is as technically great as Meirelles' and also has an "ethical-political commitment" like Ratton's.
