= Tata Amaral =

Brazilian film director

- Born: 1960 (age 65–66); São Paulo
- Occupations: director, writer, producer and actress

Tata Amaral (born 1960, in São Paulo) is a Brazilian director, writer, producer and actress. She has won various awards across South America, including 'Best director' and 'Best film'.

At a young age, Tata lost the father of her daughter. As a mother and widow, she struggled financially to pursue a career in filmmaking. Under the military dictatorship (a time that saw a rise to censorship of the arts), she participated in rallies orchestrated by the leftist, student movement. Tata received help from Brazilian state programs that financed films throughout the 1980s. She has remained sided with the Worker's Party, as is evident in her work. She became associated with other directors of the 1990s known for restoring Brazilian cinema to a level of commercial and critical success.

Her trilogy (Um Céu de Estrelas, Através de Janela, Antônia) portrays three different stages in a woman's life: birth, maturity, and death. Antônia was picked up by TV Globo and made into a television series, just as City of God had been adapted for television in City of Men. Tata's films are often politically and/or socially charged. Several themes that are recurring in her films include the Brazilian dictatorship, poverty in the favelas, women's role in society and the contemporary urban culture of Brazil.

== Filmography ==
- 2014 - Psi (TV series)
- 2013 - Trago Comigo
- 2011 - Hoje
- 2010 - Carnaval dos Deuses (short)
- 2009 - Trago Comigo (TV series)
- 2009 - O Rei do Carimã (TV documentary)
- 2007 - Antônia (TV series)
- 2006 - Antônia
- 2000 - Através da Janela
- 1996 - A Starry Sky (Um Céu de Estrelas)
- 1991 - Viver a Vida (short)
- 1988 - História Familiar (short)
- 1986 - Poema: Cidade (documentary short)
