= Orfeu =

1999 film directed by Carlos Diegues

- Theatrical release poster
- Directed by: Carlos Diegues
- Written by: Carlos Diegues; Paulo Lins; Hermano Vianna; Hamilton Vaz Pereira; João Emanuel Carneiro
- Based on: Orfeu da Conceição by Vinicius de Moraes
- Produced by: Renata Almeida Magalhães; Paula Lavigne; Daniel Filho
- Starring: Toni Garrido; Patrícia França
- Cinematography: Affonso Beato
- Edited by: Sérgio Mekler
- Music by: Caetano Veloso
- Production company: Rio Vermelho Filmes Globo Filmes
- Distributed by: Warner Bros.
- Release date: 21 April 1999
- Running time: 110 minutes
- Country: Brazil
- Language: Portuguese
- Budget: R$6.8–7 million
- Box office: R$4.5 million

Orfeu is a 1999 Brazilian romantic drama film directed by Carlos Diegues, and starring Toni Garrido, Patrícia França and Murilo Benício. Based on the play Orfeu da Conceição by Vinicius de Moraes, the film retells the Greek legend of Orpheus and Eurydice, setting it in the modern context of Rio de Janeiro during Carnival.

Mostly shot in scenographic favela in Jacarepaguá, Rio de Janeiro, it included scenes from the 1998 Carnival celebration in which Garrido paraded with the samba school Viradouro.

== Cast ==
- Toni Garrido as Orpheus
- Patrícia França as Eurydice
- Murilo Benício as Lucinho
- Zezé Motta as Conceição
- Milton Gonçalves as Inácio
- Isabel Fillardis as Mira
- Maria Ceiça as Carmen
- Stepan Nercessian as Pacheco
- Maurício Gonçalves as Pecê

== Reception ==
=== Critical response ===
Orfeu has an approval rating of 36% on review aggregator website Rotten Tomatoes, based on 14 reviews, and an average rating of 5.9/10. Metacritic assigned the film a weighted average score of 52 out of 100, based on 14 critics, indicating "mixed or average reviews".

=== Awards and nominations ===
It won the 1st Grande Prêmio Cinema Brasil for Best Film, Best Cinematography and Best Score. It was also the Brazilian submission to the 2001 Academy Award, but it did not enter the competition.

== See also ==
- Black Orpheus (Orfeu Negro), 1959 film adapted from the same source material
- List of submissions to the 72nd Academy Awards for Best Foreign Language Film
- List of Brazilian submissions for the Academy Award for Best Foreign Language Film
