= Kirill Mikhanovsky =

Russian-American director and producer

- Born: Moscow, USSR
- Occupations: director, screenwriter, producer

Kirill Mikhanovsky is a Russian–American director, screenwriter, editor, and producer, best known for directing the critically acclaimed 2019 American comedy drama Give Me Liberty.

== Biography ==
Mikhanovsky grew up in Moscow. While attending the University of Wisconsin–Milwaukee, where he majored in linguistics, Mikhanovsky drove medical transport for disabled people. Around that time, Mikhanovsky wrote and directed a short film, Terra, Terra. While in the NYU Grad Film Program Mikhanovsky studied directing under Boris Frumin.

== Career ==
Mikhanovsky made his directorial debut with Sonhos de Peixe, shot with non-actors in a fishing village in the Northeast of Brazil. Sonhos de Peixe premiered in the Semaine de la Critique section of the 59th Cannes Film Festival, where it was awarded Prix Regards Jeunes.

Mikhanovsky directed Give Me Liberty, which had its world premiere in the Directors' Fortnight section of the 72nd annual Cannes Film Festival. "Working from a screenplay he wrote with Alice Austen (who’s also a producer), Mikhanovsky proves to be a virtuoso of chaos," wrote Manohla Dargis of The New York Times. Give Me Liberty made the Top Independent Films list of the 91st National Board of Review Awards. It received four Independent Spirit Award nominations, including Best Editing for Mikhanovsky and Best Feature Under $500,000 (John Cassavetes Award), winning in the last category.

Mikhanovsky co-wrote Fellipe Gamarano Barbosa's Gabriel and the Mountain.

Mikhanovsky spent five years researching and developing a modern-day tragicomedy set in Havana, Cuba. The film went unproduced.

Mikhanovsky is a co-founder of Give Me Liberty, Mfg., a film and TV production company.

== Filmography ==
Year	Title	Credited as					Notes
Year	Title	Director	Writer	Editor	Camera	Producer	Notes
2001	Terra, Terra	Yes	Yes	Yes	No	Yes	Short fiction; in collaboration with Ikeguchi Yasuhiro
2002	Dead Roosters	No	No	Yes	No	No	Short film. Directed by Andrij Parekh
2003	Inhale, Exhale	Yes	Yes	Yes	Yes	Yes	Short Documentary
2005	Martillo	No	Yes	No	No	No	Short film. Directed by Miguel Salazar
2006	The Debt	No	No	No	Yes	No	Short film. Directed by Levan Koguashvili
2006	Sonhos de Peixe	Yes	Yes	Yes	No	Yes	Feature debut
2009	Women from Georgia	No	No	No	Yes	No	Documentary. Directed by Levan Koguashvili
2014	Dubrovsky	Yes	Yes	No	No	No	TV mini-series, Episodes 1 and 2
2017	Gabriel and the Mountain	No	Yes	No	No	No	Directed by Fellipe Gamarano Barbosa
2019	Give Me Liberty	Yes	Yes	Yes	No	Yes	Co-written with Alice Austen

== Awards and nominations ==
Year	Association	Category	Nominated work	Result	Notes
2006	Cannes Film Festival	Critics' Week. Prix Regards Jeunes	Sonhos de Peixe	Won	
2019	The Golden Unicorn Awards	Best Foreign Film with a Russian Connection	Give Me Liberty	Won	
2019	International Film Festival & Awards Macao	Best Film	Give Me Liberty	Won	
2020	Independent Spirit Awards	John Cassavetes Award	Give Me Liberty	Won	
2020	Independent Spirit Awards	Best Editing	Give Me Liberty	Nominated	

== See also ==
- Film industry in Wisconsin
