= Midnight (1998 film) =

1998 film directed by Walter Salles, Daniela Thomas

- Directed by: Walter Salles; Daniela Thomas
- Written by: Walter Salles; Daniela Thomas; João Emanuel Carneiro; José de Carvalho
- Starring: Fernanda Torres; Luiz Carlos Vasconcelos
- Cinematography: Walter Carvalho
- Edited by: Felipe Lacerda; Isabelle Rathery
- Music by: Antônio Pinto; Eduardo Bid; Naná Vasconcelos
- Production companies: Videofilmes; La Sept Arte; Haut et Court
- Distributed by: Lumière; Riofilme
- Release dates: 1998 (Locarno); October 29, 1999 (Brazil)
- Running time: 75 minutes
- Countries: Brazil; France
- Language: Portuguese
- Box office: R$347,917

Midnight (Portuguese: O Primeiro Dia) is a 1998 Brazilian-French drama film directed by Walter Salles and Daniela Thomas for the 2000, Seen By... series.

== Plot ==
As the year 1999 draws to a close, the bustling streets of Rio de Janeiro become the backdrop where two lonely souls are destined to meet.

On December 31st, destiny intertwines the lives of João (Luiz Carlos Vasconcelos), a fugitive ex-prisoner seeking revenge, and Maria (Fernanda Torres), a disheartened teacher of deaf children abandoned by boyfriend Pedro (Carlos Vereza).

As the new millennium approaches, their encounter, born out of despair, offers an unexpected chance for redemption and hope amid the chaos of the city.

Part of a global cinematic project capturing ten perspectives on the end of the millennium, this story reflects Brazil’s unique vision of renewal and human connection at the dawn of a new era.

== Cast ==
- Fernanda Torres as Maria
- Luiz Carlos Vasconcelos as João
- Matheus Nachtergaele as Francisco
- Nelson Sargento as Vovô
- Tonico Pereira as Carcereiro
- Áulio Ribeiro
- Luciana Bezerra
- Antônio Gomes
- Nelson Dantas
- Carlos Vereza
- José Dumont

== Production ==
Its production was ordered by the Franco-German TV network Arte that asked ten filmmakers of different countries about the turn of the century for the 2000, Seen By... project. A co-production with France, it was produced in three weeks with a low budget.

== Reception ==
It won the 2000 Ariel Award for Best Ibero-American Film, and the 1st Grande Prêmio Cinema Brasil for Best Actor (Nachtergaele), Director and Screenplay.
