= Hoje (film) =

2011 film directed by Tata Amaral

- Theatrical release poster
- Directed by: Tata Amaral
- Written by: Jean-Claude Bernardet; Rubens Rewald; Felipe Sholl
- Produced by: Caru Alves de Souza; Tata Amaral
- Starring: Denise Fraga; João Baldasserini; Cláudia Assunção; Lorena Lobato; Pedro Abhull; César Troncoso
- Music by: Livio Trachtenberg
- Production companies: Tangerina Entretenimento; Primo Filmes
- Distributed by: H2O Films
- Release dates: September 26, 2011 (Festival de Brasília); April 19, 2013 (Brazil)
- Running time: 90 minutes
- Country: Brazil
- Language: Portuguese

Hoje is a 2011 Brazilian drama film directed by Tata Amaral, based on the book "Prova Contrária", by Fernando Bonassi. The film was the winner of the 44th Festival de Brasília in 2011.

Starring Denise Fraga, the film tells the story of Vera, a woman who fought against the military dictatorship in Brazil and began to receive a compensation from the Government for the disappearance of her husband by Brazil's military dictatorship, which arrested and tortured thousands and killed or "disappeared" many of its victims.

== Plot ==
Ex-political activist receives compensation from the Brazilian Government for the disappearance of her husband, victim of repression unleashed by the Brazilian military government dictatorship. With the money, she can buy the so dreamed apartment and free herself of the condition of suspension in which she lived for decades, when she was not even officially recognized as widow. When moving to the new home, she receives a visit that will change her life.

== Cast ==
- Denise Fraga
- César Troncoso
- João Baldasserini
- Lorena Lobato
- Cláudia Assunção
- Pedro Abhull
