= Renalto Alves =

Brazilian actor, cinematographer and director

Renato Alves
- Born: 1950; Paraná, Brazil
- Years active: 1974-1989

Renalto Alves is a Brazilian actor, cinematographer and director. He was born in 1950 in Paranavaí in Paraná.
