= Giulia Gam =

Brazilian actress

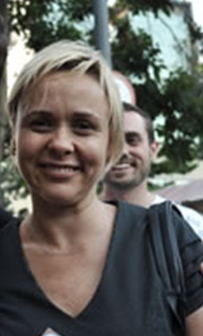
- Gam in 2012
- Born: Giulia Daysi Gam; 28 December 1966 (age 59); Perugia, Umbria, Italy
- Occupation: Actress
- Years active: 1987–present
- Spouse: Pedro Bial (m. 1998; div. 2000)
- Children: 1

Giulia Daysi Gam (born 28 December 1966) is a Brazilian actress.

== Biography ==
Giulia was born in Perugia when her father, José Carlos Gam Heuss, was taking a course. Her parents are both Brazilians. She has a Danish grandfather.

== Career ==
She became famous in Brazil after performing the young Jocasta Silveira in the soap opera Mandala and since then started a meteoric career in television, despite being one of the most seminal thespians of Brazil.

Giulia's biography registers a respectable stage career, from which she was chosen for her debut in Rede Globo, Giulia played the character Jocasta, when young, in the telenovela Mandala (the adult Jocasta was portrayed by actress Vera Fischer). Giulia came to the telenovela without any experience in television, other than some ads and videos made by friends from an independent film company. She carried out four years of exhaustive and obsessive work in theatre. In the stage, Giulia debuted under direction of Antunes Filho, in the Shakespeare's play Romeo and Juliet, in São Paulo, in 1984.

With Antunes Filho's company she travelled in a long tour by Australia, Europe, U.S. and Israel. After it dissolved, she travelled to Paris, where she found Peter Brook, who motivated her to go on with her stage career.

In January 1987, back to Brazil, Giulia joined the cast of the Jean Racine play Phèdre, invited by actress Fernanda Montenegro. In October of the same year, she debuted in TV, with a huge success.

== Personal life ==
By the end of the 1980s, she was in a relationship with musician Tony Bellotto.

== Filmography ==
=== Television ===
- 1987 - Mandala.... Jocasta (Young)
- 1988 - O Primo Basílio.... Luísa
- 1989 - Que Rei Sou Eu?.... Aline
- 1991 - Vamp.... Lucia
- 1992 - Procura-se
- 1992 - Você Decide, Laços de Família
- 1993 - Caso Especial, O Alienista
- 1993 - Caso Especial, Lucíola
- 1993 - Caso Especial, Lisbela e o Prisioneiro
- 1993 - Retrato de Mulher, Era Uma Vez .... Leila
- 1993 - Fera Ferida.... Linda Inês
- 1995 - A Comédia da Vida Privada, Casados x Solteiros.... Ana
- 1995 - A Comédia da Vida Privada, Sexo na Cabeça.... Camila
- 1996 - A Comédia da Vida Privada, Como Destruir Seu Casamento
- 1996 - A Comédia da Vida Privada, Drama
- 1996 - A Vida como Ela É...
- 1998 - Dona Flor e Seus Dois Maridos.... Dona Flor
- 1999 - Você Decide, Numa e Ninfa
- 2000 - Brava Gente
- 2001 - Os Normais, Faça o seu Pedido.... Clara
- 2001 - A Padroeira.... Antonieta
- 2002 - A Grande Família, Os Boçais.... Jaqueline
- 2002 - Os Normais, Desconfianças Normais.... Taís
- 2003 - Mulheres Apaixonadas.... Heloísa Morais
- 2004 - Celebridade.... Herself
- 2004 - A Diarista, Quem vai ficar com Marinete?.... Nanci
- 2005 - A Diarista, É fria, Marinete!.... Rogelma
- 2005 - A História de Rosa
- 2005 - Bang Bang.... Vegas Locomotiv / Moll Flanders
- 2007 - Eterna Magia.... Regina Ferreira / Shirleyd / Raimunda Ferreira
- 2008 - A Favorita.... Diva Palhares / Rosana Costa / Kato / Miranda
- 2009 - Força-Tarefa, Temporada de Caça.... Cláudia
- 2009 - Aline.... Sofia
- 2010 - Ti Ti Ti.... Bruna Soares Sampaio
- 2011 - Chico Xavier .... Rita
- 2011 - A Grande Família, A República do Salto Alto.... Estela
- 2011 - A Grande Família, A Noite Perfeita.... Estela
- 2012 - As Brasileiras.... Soraya
- 2012 - Amor Eterno Amor.... Laura Belize
- 2012 - Guerra dos Sexos.... Gisele
- 2013 - Sangue Bom.... Bárbara Ellen (Conceição da Silva)
- 2014 - Boogie Oogie .... Carlota Veiga Azevedo Braga

=== Selected films ===
- 1987 - Besame Mucho
- 2005 - Árido Movie
- 2010 - Chico Xavier
- 2011 - Assalto ao Banco Central
