= Chico Díaz =

Brazilian actor (born 1959)

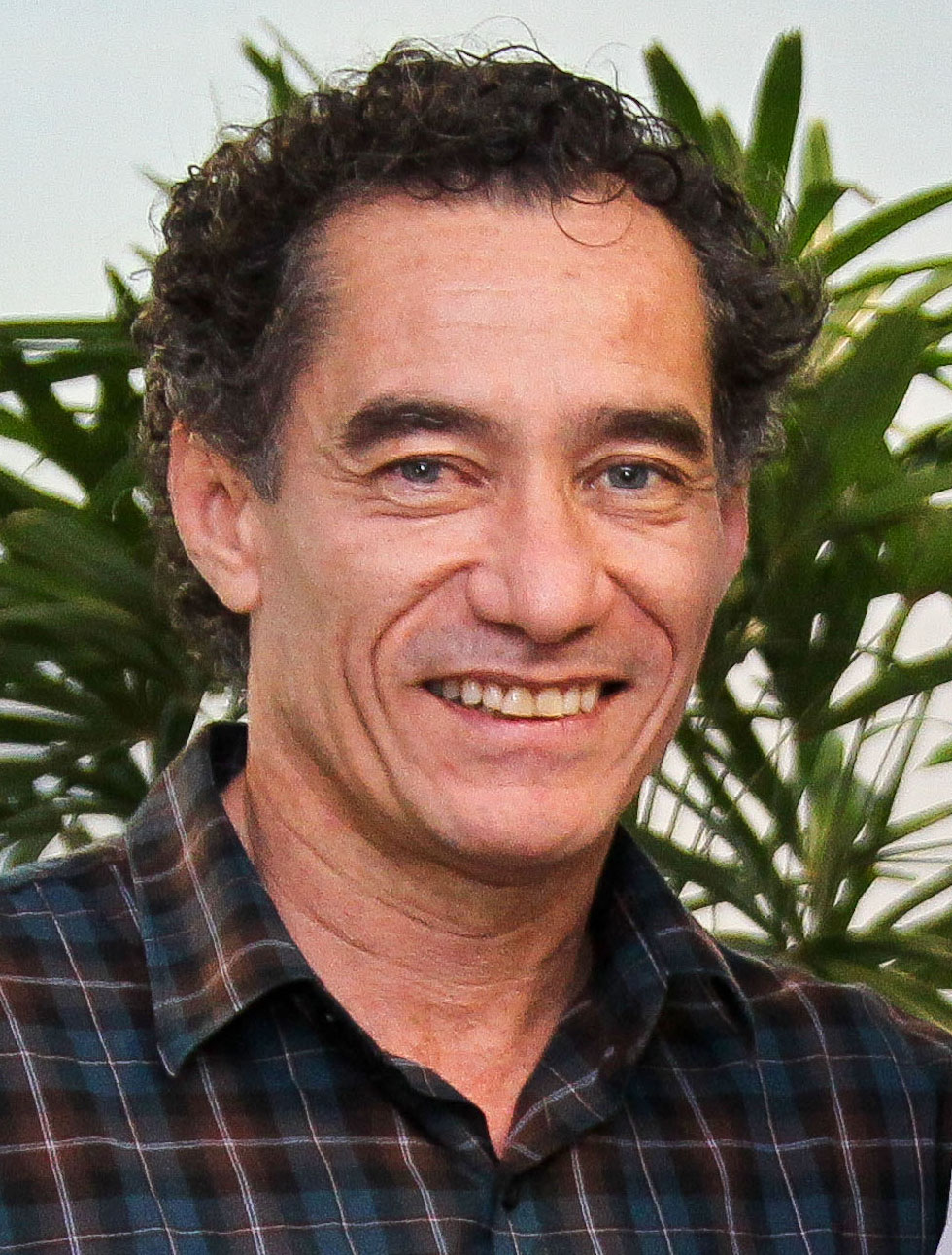
- Díaz in 2011
- Born: Francisco Díaz Rocha; 16 February 1959 (age 67); Mexico City, Mexico
- Citizenship: Brazil; Paraguay
- Education: Federal University of Rio de Janeiro
- Occupation: Actor
- Years active: 1978–present
- Spouses: Cecília Santana (divorced) Sílvia Buarque (m. 2004)
- Children: 2
- Relatives: Chico Buarque (father-in-law); Marieta Severo (mother-in-law)
- Family: Juan Díaz Bordenave (father); Maria Cândida (mother); Enrique Díaz (younger brother)

Francisco "Chico" Díaz Rocha (born 16 February 1959) is a Brazilian actor.

== Biography ==
Francisco Díaz Rocha was born in Mexico City. He is the son of Juan Díaz Bordenave, a Paraguayan journalist and pedagogue, and Maria Cândida, a Brazilian translator. He was raised in Rio de Janeiro, where their parents decided to live in 1968.

He was married to actress Cecília Santana, with whom he has a son called Antônio. He is currently married to actress Sílvia Buarque, with whom he has a daughter called Irene.

== Selected filmography ==
- Gabriela, Cravo e Canela (1983)
- Quilombo (1984)
- Avaete, Seed of Revenge (1985)
- The Man in the Black Cape (1986)
- Where the River Runs Black (1986)
- The Third Bank of the River (1994)
- Perfumed Ball (1996)
- Força de um Desejo (1999)
- Mango Yellow (2002)
- The Forest (2002)
- América (2005)
- Sonhos de Peixe (2006)
- Paraíso Tropical (2007)
- A Favorita (2008)
- O Contador de Histórias (a.k.a. The Story of Me) (2009)
- Gabriela (2012)
- Todas as Flores (2022)
- Renascer (2024)
