= Estômago =

2007 film directed by Marcos Jorge

- Theatrical poster
- Directed by: Marcos Jorge
- Screenplay by: Lusa Silvestre; Marcos Jorge; Cláudia da Natividade; Fabrizio Donvito
- Story by: Lusa Silvestre; Marcos Jorge
- Produced by: Cláudia da Natividade; Fabrizio Donvito; Marco Cohen
- Starring: João Miguel; Fabiula Nascimento; Babu Santana; Alexander Sil; Carlo Briani; Zeca Cenovicz; Paulo Miklos; Jean Pierre Noher; Andrea Fumagalli
- Cinematography: Toca Seabra
- Edited by: Luca Alverdi
- Music by: Giovanni Venosta
- Production companies: Zencrane Filmes; Indiana Production Company
- Distributed by: Downtown Filmes (Brazil)
- Release dates: September 26, 2007 (Rio de Janeiro International Film Festival); April 11, 2008 (Brazil)
- Running time: 100 minutes
- Countries: Brazil; Italy
- Language: Portuguese
- Budget: R$ 800,000

Estômago (Portuguese for stomach), or Estômago, a Gastronomic Story, is a 2007 Brazilian–Italian black comedy crime film directed by Marcos Jorge. The film won several awards. It was shot in several locations of Curitiba, Paraná.

In 2015, the Brazilian Film Critics Association aka Abraccine voted Estômago the 74th greatest Brazilian film of all time, in its list of the 100 best Brazilian films.

A sequel titled Estômago 2: O Poderoso Chef was released in 2024. João Miguel and Paulo Miklos reprise their roles.

== Plot ==
The film shows in parallel two periods in the life of Raimundo Nonato (João Miguel): one follows his successful career as a cook, the other as a prisoner in a cell with about ten other convicts. It gradually becomes clear that these events happen after the former.

His period as a cook starts when he arrives by bus in a big city, without a place to sleep nor money for food. After eating chicken snacks in a cafeteria, he has to wash the dishes to pay for it and is eventually offered a job, receiving merely food and lodging as payment, even though the snacks he cooks are so good it attracts more customers. Nonato falls in love with Íria, a gluttonous prostitute, who offers her services in exchange for food. He also gets a better job in an Italian restaurant, where he learns more of cooking from his boss Giovanni. One day he finds Giovanni having sex with Íria, despite he having proposed to her earlier. Enraged, he steals and drinks from his boss' prized wine collection, before murdering them both and cannibalizing a slice of meat removed from Íria's buttocks.

In the prison cell there is a power hierarchy with Bujiú (Babu Santana) at the top. The food is poor, and Nonato is assigned to cook better food. The inmates are usually quite satisfied with it, and Nonato rises in the hierarchy. However, Bujiú rejects Gorgonzola, raw meat, and cooked ants, much to Raimundo's frustration. When top-criminal Etcetera, who is highly regarded by the inmates, arrives, Bujiú decides that a great meal should be cooked to please him. The main prison kitchen is arranged for the occasion, an event which Nonato takes advantage of to poison Bujiú, ultimately leading to him becoming the leader of his cell.

== Cast ==
- João Miguel as Nonato
- Fabiula Nascimento as Íria
- Babu Santana as Bujiú
- Alexander Sil as Lino
- Carlo Briani as Giovanni
- Zeca Cenovicz as Zulmiro
- Paulo Miklos as Etcetera
- Jean Pierre Noher as Duque
- Andrea Fumagalli as Francesco

== Critical reception ==
Since its release the film has received acclaim from critics.

Ard Vijn of Screen Anarchy wrote a positive review of the film stating: "A nice tale about the relativity of happiness, "Estômago" gives you the grandfatherly advise that 'getting there' is often more fun than 'being there'."

Critic Laura Kern from Film Comment Magazine wrote a glowing review saying that "Marcos Jorge’s Estômago, in which one man’s culinary skills serve to embellish his ill-fated existence, is one of the most arresting foodie films to come along in some time. Its frequent close-ups of dishes being prepared are so luscious—and its accompanying score so playfully lusty—that it might even be described as food porn." And she went onto praise lead actor João Miguel's performance, having wrote that he delivered a "layered performance, we sympathize with Raimundo through his transformation from simpleton to conniver, all the while anticipating the atrocious crime he will most certainly commit."
