= CUFA =

Brazilian non-governmental organization

CUFA (Central Única das Favelas or Unified Central of Favelas) is a non-governmental organization in Brazil. Celso Athayde, a music producer and community organizer born in Favela do Sapo, founded the organization in 1999 with rapper and social activist MV Bill. Beginning Rio de Janeiro, Brazil, with a motto of "fazendo do nosso jeito” (doing it our way), it is dedicated to empowering the impoverished to identify and solve the social problems that affect them most, becoming their own best advocates for change instead of simply being assisted by government and non-profit programs.

== Description ==
CUFA was founded in 1999. Since then it has grown to include presences in all twenty-seven states of Brazil, where it develops community spaces and projects in education, environment, culture and sports, alongside educational classes such as computer training. These programs help teach life and professional skills to teenagers, giving them alternatives to crime, and bring their perspectives on favela life to the outside world.

Since 2009 CUFA has developed branches and social projects in several countries including Argentina, Austria, Bolivia, Chile, Germany, Haiti, Hungary, Italy, Spain and the US.
