= Denise Fraga =

Brazilian actress

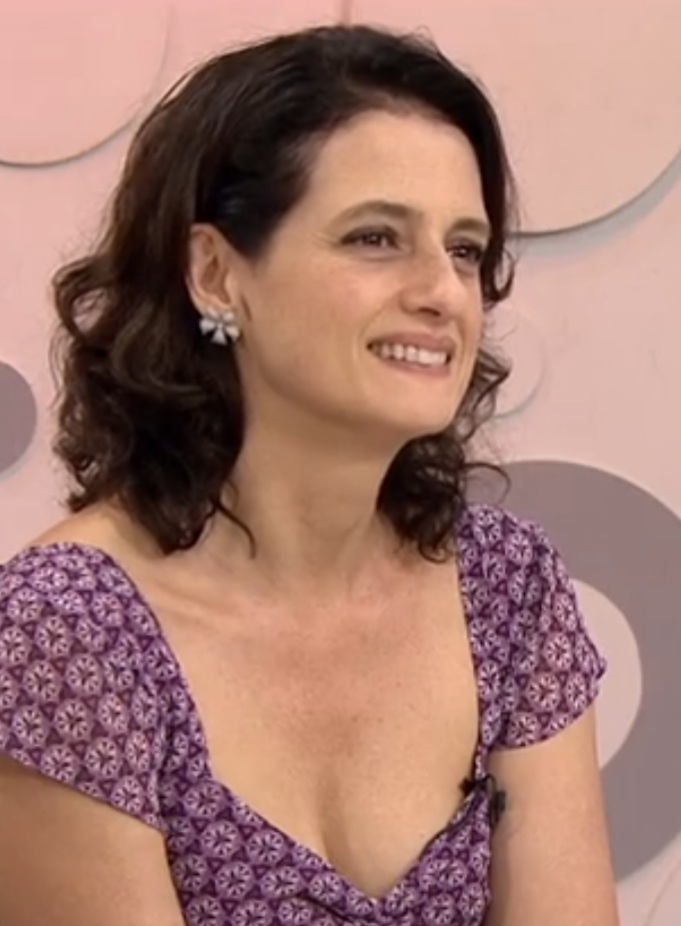
- Fraga in 2016
- Born: 15 October 1964 (age 60); Rio de Janeiro, Brazil
- Occupation: Actress
- Years active: 1985–present
- Spouse: Luiz Villaça
- Children: 2

Denise Rodrigues Fraga (born 15 October 1964) is a Brazilian actress. She is also a columnist at Editora Globo's Crescer magazine.

== Filmography ==
- Bambolê (1987) – Amália
- A, E, I, O, Urca (1990)
- Barriga de Aluguel (1990) – Ritinha
- Éramos Seis (1994) – Olga
- Sangue do Meu Sangue (1995) – Natália
- Cousin Bazilio (1998) – Natália
- Por Trás do Pano (1999) – Helena
- O Auto da Compadecida (2000) – Dora
- Uga-Uga (2000) – Meg
- Cristina Quer Casar (2003) – Cristina
- The Sign of the City (2007) – Lydia
- Norma (2009) – Norma
- O Contador Histórias (2009)
- As Melhores Coisas do Mundo (2010) – Camila
- Hoje (2011) – Vera
- A Lei do Amor (2016) – Cândida Martins
- Kissing Game (2020)
- Um Lugar ao Sol (2021) – Júlia
