= Matheus Nachtergaele =

Brazilian actor and director (born 1968)

OMC Matheus Nachtergaele
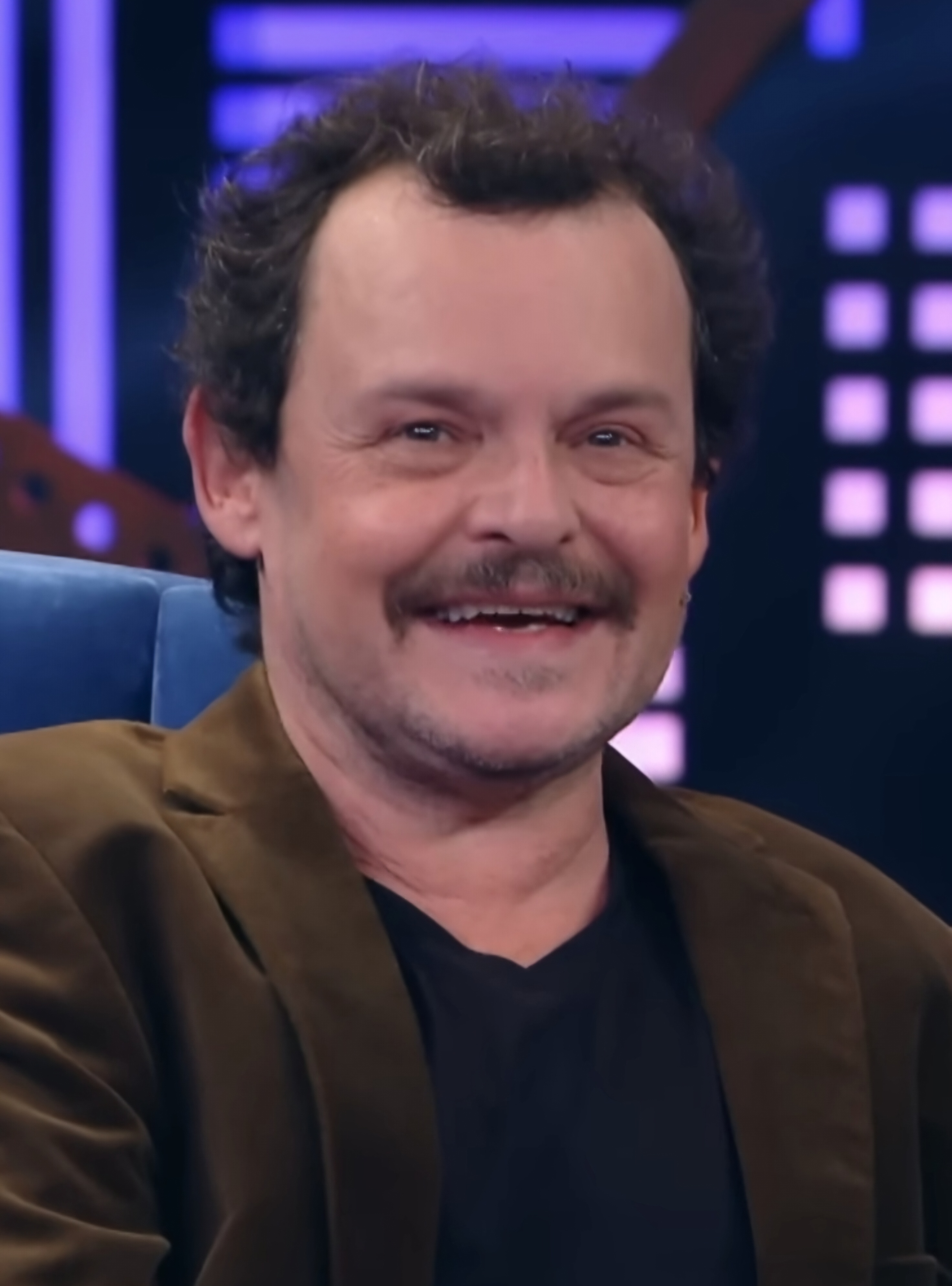
- Nachtergaele in 2024
- Born: 3 January 1968 (age 58); São Paulo, Brazil
- Occupation: Actor
- Years active: 1992–present
- Known for: João Grilo in O Auto da Compadecida (2000)
- Height: 1.63 m (5 ft 4 in)

Matheus Nachtergaele OMC (Brazilian Portuguese: [maˈtewz naʃteʁˈɡali]; born 3 January 1968) is a Brazilian actor, film director, and screenwriter. He has starred in numerous Brazilian films and is best known for his performances in Four Days in September (1997), O Auto da Compadecida (2000) and City of God (2002). Nachtergaele is widely regarded as one of the most versatile Brazilian actors of his generation.

== Early life ==
Matheus Nachtergaele was born on 3 January 1968 in São Paulo to an upper-middle-class, artistic family. His father, Jean-Pierre, was a jazz musician and his mother, Maria Cecília, was a poet who committed suicide when Matheus was only three months old. As a result, Matheus lived with his paternal grandparents’ early in his life between their farm in Atibaia and their beach house in Ubatuba. Matheus wouldn't learn about her mother's suicide until he was sixteen years old. In 2018, Matheus staged the monologue Concerto do Desejo (English: Concert of Desire), produced by him based on the poems written by his mother. According to Matheus, she was the inspiration for him to pursue an artistic career. Jean-Pierre would later remarry to Carmen, Matheus's stepmother, after earning his engineering degree from the University of São Paulo. Together, they would have three sons.

Nachtergaele began his acting career at in 1989. Following an invitation from a friend, he studied for a year under director Antunes Filho at the School of Dramatic Arts at USP, unbeknownst of his parents, who didn't want him to pursue an artistic career. After being dismissed by Filho for not being "ready yet," Nachtergaele fell into a state of depression and moved to Belgium to live with his cousin; through his father, Nachtergaele is of paternal Belgian descent. During his life in Europe, he worked as a crooner in nightclubs between Brussels and Paris. Influenced by spirit for art, at the age of twenty-one, he moved to Paris to study at the Conservatoire de Paris. Stricken with homesickness, Nachtergaele returned to Brazil after two years.

== Career ==
Upon returning to Brazil, he entered the School of Dramatic Arts at USP, graduating in 1991. He gained notoriety in 1992 with the company Teatro da Vertigem, under the direction of António Araújo, and had his work recognized for his performance in the company's award-winning show Livro de Jó.

He has twice won the Best Actor award in the Grande Prêmio do Cinema Brasileiro, for his roles in Midnight (1998) in 2000 and O Auto da Compadecida (2000) in 2001. He also won the Best Actor award for Mango Yellow at XIII Cine Ceará in 2003. In 2008, he made his directorial debut with The Dead Girl's Feast. Other awards and nominations during the course of his career include the Festival de Gramado, Los Angeles Brazilian Film Festival, and two nominations at the Cannes Film Festival.

== Personal life ==
In 2014, Nachtergaele revealed that he was bisexual and that he had tried to define himself sexually, but that "it was no use" since, according to Nachtergaele, no one "fits on a shelf" when it comes to sexuality and that everyone has their own definition.

== Selected filmography ==
=== Feature films ===
- Four Days in September (1997)
- Central Station (1998)
- Midnight (1998)
- A Dog's Will (2000)
- City of God (2002)
- Mango Yellow (2002)
- Nina (2004)
- Journey to the End of the Night (2006)
- La virgen negra (2008)
- Bald Mountain (2013)
- Don't Call Me Son (2016)
- Zama (2017)
- Get the Goat (2021)
- Heavier Is the Sky (2023)

=== Television ===
- Da Cor do Pecado (2004)
- América (2005)
- Renascer (2024)
- Vale Tudo (2025)
