= Cláudio Assis =

Brazilian filmmaker

- Born: December 19, 1959 (age 66); Caruaru, Brazil
- Occupation: Film director

Cláudio Assis (born December 19, 1959) is a Brazilian filmmaker. He was born in Caruaru, in the state of Pernambuco, and went to Recife, the state's capital, when he was 17.

There, he started to attend for Economics and Communication studies, but he felt "totally incompatible" with its structure. After working as assistant in some production, he went to direct his own short films: Padre Henrique - Um Crime Político (1987), Soneto do Desmantelo Blue (1993), Viva o Cinema (1996), and Texas Hotel (1999). The latter served as inspiration for his first feature film Mango Yellow, which was released in 2002, winning several awards including the Best Film at the Festival de Brasília. His second feature film, Bog of Beasts (2006), debuted won five awards, including Best Film, at the Festival de Brasília, and the Tiger Award at the International Film Festival Rotterdam. Rat Fever, his third film, was released in 2011 and won the Best Film Award at the Festival de Paulínia.

== Filmography ==
=== Film ===
- Henrique (1987) (short)
- Soneto do Desmantelo Blue (1993) (short)
- Texas Hotel (1999) (short)
- O Brasil em Curtas 06 - Curtas Pernambucanos (1999) (segment)
- Mango Yellow (2002)
- Bog of Beasts (2006)
- Rat Fever (2011)
- Big Jato (2016)
- Piedade (2019)

=== Documentary ===
- Punk Rock Hardcore (1995) (short)
- Viva o Cinema (1996)
- Segundo Take (2019) (TV Series)
