= Helvécio Ratton =

Brazilian film director

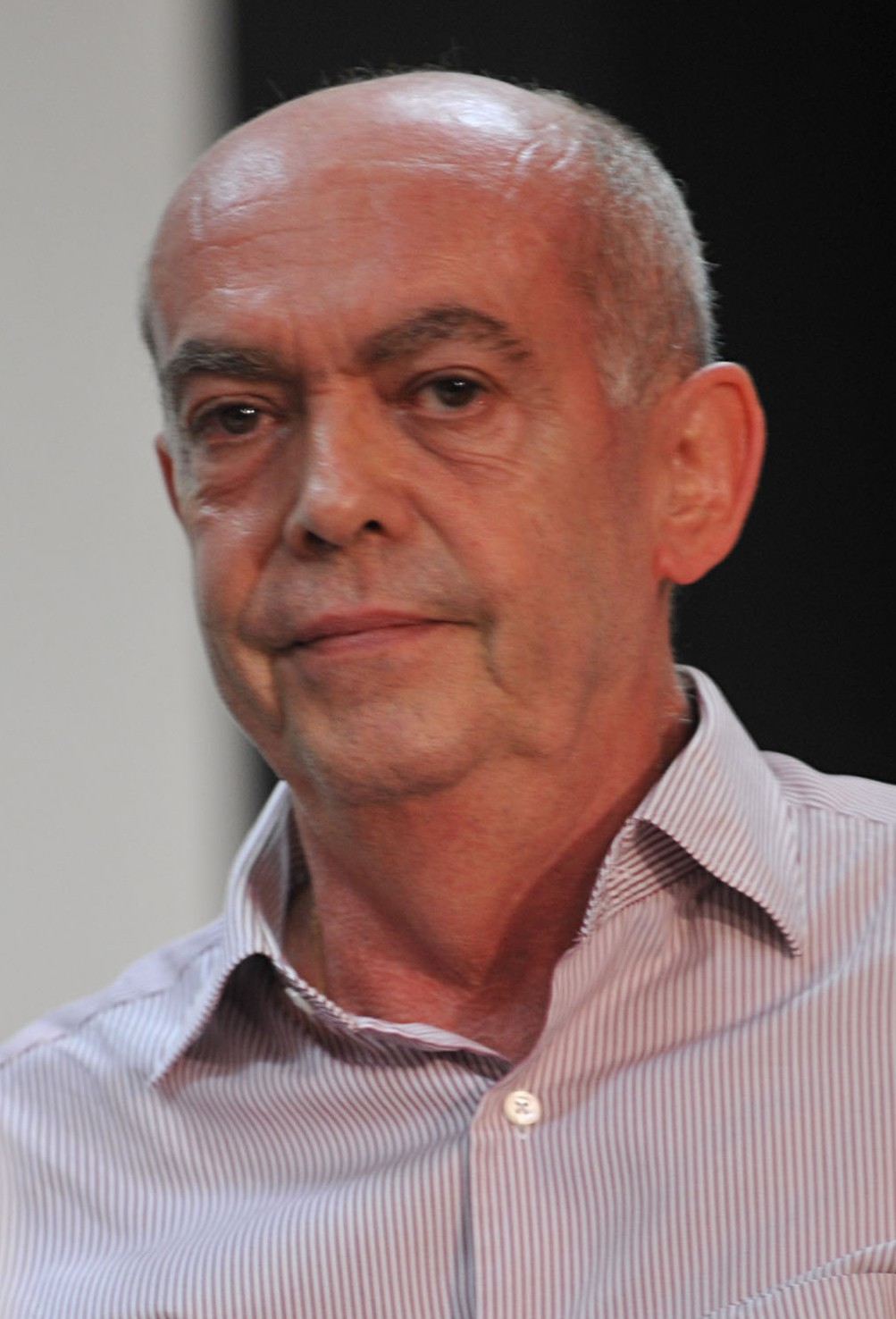
- Helvécio Ratton in 2009
- Born: May 14, 1949 (age 77); Divinópolis, Brazil
- Occupations: Director, producer, screenwriter
- Years active: 1978–present

Helvécio Ratton (born May 14, 1949) is a Brazilian film director, producer and screenwriter. He started his career as a film director in 1979, when he filmed a documentary at the Hospital Colônia de Barbacena.

== Filmography ==
- Criação (1978; short film)
- Em Nome da Razão (1979; short film)
- João Rosa (1980; short film)
- Um Homem Público (1981; short film)
- Cidadão Favelado (1982; short film)
- A Dança dos Bonecos (1986)
- Menino Maluquinho: O Filme (1995)
- Pequenas Estórias (1996; short film)
- Love and Co (1998)
- Something in the Air (2002)
- Baptism of Blood (2006)
- Pequenas Histórias (2007)
- O Segredo dos Diamantes (2014)
