= Grande Prêmio do Cinema Brasileiro =

Brazilian film award

- Awarded for: Best Brazilian films
- Country: Brazil
- Presented by: Ministry of Culture (2000–2001); Academia Brasileira de Cinema (2002–present)
- First award: 2000
- Website: academiabrasileiradecinema.com.br

The Grande Prêmio do Cinema Brasileiro (English: Grand Prize of Brazilian Cinema), more popularly known as the Grande Otelo, is a Brazilian film award given annually by the Brazilian Academy of Cinema. It was established in 2000 as the Grande Prêmio Cinema Brasil by the Ministry of Culture of Brazil that presented it in 2000 and 2001. In 2002, the newly established Academia Brasileira de Cinema took on the role of delivering the award which was then renamed to Grande Prêmio do Cinema Brasileiro.

The award was sponsored by BR Distribuidora, with the 2002 edition having a "BR" in its name; in 2003, however, there was no sponsor. In 2004, it gained "TAM" in its name since TAM Airlines (now LATAM Airlines Brasil) became the award sponsor. From 2008 to 2009 its sponsorship was provided by Vivo. From 2010 onward it has no company sponsoring it. In December 2023, the award was officially renamed to the Prêmio Grande Otelo from its 23rd edition and beyond, in a tribute to Grande Otelo.

== Awards categories ==
The awards given include:

- Best Film
- Best Director
- Best Actor
- Best Supporting Actor
- Best Actress
- Best Supporting Actress
- Best Foreign Film
- Best Original Screenplay
- Best Adapted Screenplay
- Best Cinematography
- Best Editing
- Best Production Design
- Best Costume Design
- Best Score
- Best Sound
- Best Documentary
- Best Make-Up
- Best Short Film

== See also ==
- 1st Grande Prêmio Cinema Brasil
- 2nd Grande Prêmio Cinema Brasil
