= 2013 Grande Prêmio do Cinema Brasileiro =

12th Grande Prêmio do Cinema Brasileiro
- Date: November 13, 2013
- Site: Cidade das Artes; Rio de Janeiro, Rio de Janeiro, Brazil

Highlights
- Best Film: Gonzaga - de Pai pra Filho
- Most awards: Gonzaga - de Pai pra Filho (5)
- Most nominations: Gonzaga - de Pai pra Filho (15)

Television coverage
- Network: Canal Brasil

The 2013 Grande Prêmio do Cinema Brasileiro is the 12th edition of Grande Prêmio do Cinema Brasileiro, presented by Academia Brasileira de Cinema (Brazilian Academy of Cinema), honored the best Brazilians films of 2012. The ceremony took place on November 13, 2013, at Cidade das Artes, Rio de Janeiro and was televised by Canal Brasil.

== Winners and nominees ==
Winners are listed first and highlighted in boldface.

| Best Film | Best Director |
|---|---|
| **Gonzaga - de Pai pra Filho**; Corações Sujos; Febre do Rato; Heleno; Xingu | **Breno Silveira** - (Gonzaga - de Pai pra Filho); Afonso Poyart - (2 Coelhos); Cao Hamburger - (Xingu); Cláudio Assis - (Febre do Rato); Walter Carvalho - (Raul - O Início, o Fim e o Meio) |
| Best Actress | Best Actor |
| **Dira Paes** - (À Beira do Caminho); Alessandra Negrini - (2 Coelhos); Hermila Guedes - (Era uma vez eu, Verônica); Nanda Costa - (Febre do Rato); Simone Spoladore - (Sudoeste) | **Júlio Andrade** - (Gonzaga - de Pai pra Filho); Caio Blat - (Xingu); Daniel de Oliveira - (Boca); João Miguel - (Xingu); Rodrigo Santoro - (Heleno) |
| Best Supporting Actress | Best Supporting Actor |
| **Ângela Leal** - (Febre do Rato); **Leandra Leal** - (Boca); Andrea Beltrão - (Os Penetras); Dira Paes - (Sudoeste); Zezé Motta - (Gonzaga - de Pai pra Filho) | **Cláudio Cavalcanti** - (Astro, uma fábula urbana em um Rio de Janeiro mágico); **João Miguel** - (Gonzaga - de Pai pra Filho); Ângelo Antônio - (À Beira do Caminho); Domingos Montagner - (Gonzaga - de Pai pra Filho); Eduardo Moscovis - (Corações Sujos) |
| Best Cinematography | Best Art Direction |
| **Heleno** - Walter Carvalho; Corações Sujos - Rodrigo Monte; Gonzaga - de Pai pra Filho - Adrian Teijido; Paraísos Artificiais - Lula Carvalho; Xingu - Adriano Goldman | **Corações Sujos** - Daniel Flaksman; **Xingu** - Cássio Amarante; **Heleno** - Marlise Storchi; Paraísos Artificiais - Cláudio Amaral Peixoto; Gonzaga - de Pai pra Filho - Cláudio Amaral Peixoto |
| Best Costume Design | Best Makeup and Hairstyles |
| **Heleno** - Rita Murtinho; Corações Sujos - Cristina Kangussu; Gonzaga - de Pai pra Filho - Ana Avelar and Cláudia Kopke; Paraísos Artificiais - Cláudia Kopke; Xingu - Verônica Julian | **Heleno** - Martín Marcías Trujillo; 2 Coelhos - Doel Sauerbronn; Corações Sujos - Marilu Mattos; Gonzaga - de Pai pra Filho - Martín Marcías Trujillo; Reis e Ratos - Lu Moraes; Xingu - Anna Van Steen |
| Best Special Effects | Best Editing |
| **2 Coelhos** - Carlos Faia, Gus Martinez and Chico de Deus; Corações Sujos - Sérgio Farjalla Jr.; Gonzaga - de Pai pra Filho - Cláudio Peralta; Paraísos Artificiais - Robson Sartori; Xingu - Hugo Gurgel | **2 Coelhos** - Afonso Poyart, André Toledo and Lucas Gonzaga; Corações Sujos - Diana Vasconcellos; Gonzaga - de Pai pra Filho - Gustavo Giani and Vicente Krubrusly; Heleno - Sérgio Mekler; Xingu - Gustavo Giani |
| Best Original Screenplay | Best Adapted Screenplay |
| **Febre do Rato** - Hilton Lacerda; 2 Coelhos - Afonso Poyart; Gonzaga - de Pai pra Filho - Patrícia Andrade; Heleno - Felipe Bragança, Fernando Castets and José Henrique Fonseca; Xingu - Anna Muylaert, Cao Hamburger and Elena Soarez | **Corações Sujos** - David França Mendes; Boca - Flávio Frederico and Mariana Pamplona; E Aí... Comeu? - Lusa Silvestre and Marcelo Rubens Paiva; Luz nas trevas – a volta do Bandido da luz Vermelha - Helena Ignez; Menos que Nada - Carlos Gerbase. |
| Best Documentary | Best Children Film |
| **Raul - O Início, o Fim e o Meio**; 5x Pacificação; A Música Segundo Tom Jobim; Tropicália; Uma Longa Viagem | **Peixonauta - Agente Secreto da O.S.T.R.A.**; 31 Minutos, o Filme; Brichos - A Floresta é Nossa; Cocoricó Conta Clássicos |
| Best Documentary Editing | Best Sound |
| **Raul - O Início, o Fim e o Meio** - Pablo Ribeiro; A Música Segundo Tom Jobim - Luelane Correa; Marcelo Yuka no caminho das setas - Jordana Berg; Marighella - Vânia Debs; Tropicália - Oswaldo Santana | **Gonzaga - de Pai pra Filho** - Alessandro Laroca, Armando Torres Jr., Eduardo Virmond Lima, Renato Calaça and Valéria Ferro.; 2 Coelhos - André Tadeu, Rodrigo Ferrante, Lia Camargo and Tide Borges.; À Beira do Caminho - Alessandro Laroca, Armando Torres Jr. and Valéria Ferro.; Paraísos Artificiais - Alessandro Laroca, Armando Torres Jr., Eduardo Virmond Lima and Leandro Lima.; Xingu - Alessandro Laroca, Armando Torres Jr., Eduardo Virmond Lima and Paulo Ricardo. |
| Best Score | Best Original Score |
| **A Música Segundo Tom Jobim** - Paulo Jobim; E Aí... Comeu? - Plínio Profeta; Luz nas trevas – a volta do Bandido da luz Vermelha - Helena Ignez, Lúcio Branco, Rodrigo Lima and Sinai Sganzerla; Reis e Ratos - Caetano Veloso and Mauro Lima; Tropicália - Alexandre Kassin; Violeta foi para o Céu - José Miguel Miranda and José Miguel Tobar | **2 Coelhos** - André Abujamra and Márcio Nigro; Corações Sujos - Akihiko Matsumoto; Gonzaga - de Pai pra Filho - Berna Ceppas; Heleno - Berna Ceppas; Xingu - Beto Villares |
| Best Fictional Short Film | Best Foreign Language Film |
| **Laura**; A Mão que Afaga; A Melhor Idade; A onda traz, o vento leva; O Duplo | **The Intouchables**; Hugo; A Separation; Argo; Life of Pi |

=== Audience Awards ===
- Best Film: Febre do Rato
- Best Documentary: Raul - O Início, o Fim e o Meio
- Best Foreign Film : The Intouchables

== See also ==
- Cinema of Brazil
