= List of Brazilian films of 2012 =

This is a list of Brazilian films released in 2012.

Title	Director	Cast	Genre	Notes
2 Coelhos	Afonso Poyart	Fernando Alves Pinto, Alessandra Negrini, Caco Ciocler, Marat Descartes, Djair Guilherme, Roberto Marchese	Action	
À Beira do Caminho	Breno Silveira	João Miguel, Dira Paes, Vinícius Nascimento, Ludmila Rosa, Denise Weinberg	Drama	
A Música Segundo Tom Jobim	Dora Jobim, Nelson Pereira dos Santos		Bio-pic	
Artificial Paradises	Marcos Prado	Nathalia Dill, Luca Bianchi, Lívia de Bueno	Drama	
As Aventuras de Agamenon, o Repórter	Victor Lopes	Marcelo Adnet, Luana Piovani, Fernanda Montenegro, Hubert, Cláudio Tovar	Comedy	
Astro: An Urban Fable in a Magical Rio De Janeiro	Paula Trabulsi	Alexandra Dahlström, Veronica Debom, Cláudio Cavalcanti	Drama	
Billi Pig	José Eduardo Belmonte	Selton Mello, Grazi Massafera, Cássia Kis Magro, Preta Gil, Aimée Espinosa	Comedy	
Brichos - A Floresta é Nossa	Paulo Munhoz		Animated film	
Colegas	Marcelo Galvão	Ariel Goldenberg, Rita Pokk, Breno Viola, Lima Duarte, Rui Unas, Deto Montenegro	Comedy	
De Pernas pro Ar 2	Roberto Santucc	Ingrid Guimarães, Flávia Alessandra, Heloísa Perissé, Bruno Garcia	Comedy	
Dirty Hearts	Vicente Amorim	Tsuyoshi Ihara, Takako Tokiwa, Eiji Okuda, Shun Sugata, Kimiko Yo, Eduardo Moscovis, Celine Miyuki	Thriller	Based on the Brazilian best-seller book with the same name written by Fernando Morais
E Aí, Comeu?	Felipe Joffily	Bruno Mazzeo, Tainá Müller, Marcos Palmeira, Dira Paes	Comedy	
Father's Chair	Luciano Moura	Wagner Moura, Mariana Lima, Lima Duarte	Drama	The film was selected for the 2012 Sundance Film Festival.
Febre do Rato	Cláudio Assis	Nanda Costa, Matheus Nachtergaele, Juliano Caszarré	Drama	
Giovanni Improtta	José Wilker	José Wilker, Andréa Beltrão, Marcelo Adnet, Jô Soares, Milton Gonçalves, André Mattos	Comedy	
Gonzaga - De Pai pra Filho	Breno Silveira	Chambinho, Land Vieira, Julio Andrade, Nanda Costa	Drama	
Heleno	José Henrique Fonseca	Rodrigo Santoro, Alinne Moraes, Othon Bastos, Herson Capri	Bio-pic	Official selection, Toronto International Film Festival
Jorge Mautner - O Filho do Holocausto	Pedro Bial, Heitor D’Alincourt	Jorge Mautner, Gilberto Gil, Caetano Veloso	Documentary	
Independent Roads	Lucas Estevan Soares	Louise D’Tuani, Marcelo Cavalcanti, Giordanna Forte, Roberto Birindelli, Jeff Grace, Camila Leccioli, Jochen Matschke, Max Dern, Edgar Díaz, Fernando Renny de Oliveira, Lucas Estevan Soares, Arisa Nanasi, Eiji Leon Lee	Drama	
Uma Longa Viagem	Lúcia Murat	Caio Blat	Documentary	
Luz nas Trevas – A Volta do Bandido da Luz Vermelha	Helena Ignez, Ícaro Martins	Ney Matogrosso, Maria Luisa Mendonça, Simone Spoladore, André Guerreiro Lopes, Djin Sganzerla	Adventure	
Marighella	Inês Grinspum Ferraz		Documentary	
Neighbouring Sounds	Kleber Mendonça Filho	Irandhir Santos, Gustavo Jahn, Maeve Jinkings	Drama	Appointed by the critic A. O. Scott from The New York Times as one of the world's top 10 movies made in 2012
O Homem que Não Dormia	Edgard Navarro	Bertrand Duarte, Evelin Buchegger, Fabio Vidal, Mariana Freire	Horror	
Once Upon a Time Was I, Verônica	Marcelo Gomes	Emilio Dantas, Remo Rocha, Paloma Duarte	Drama	
Paralelo 10	Silvio Da-Rin		Documentary	
Peixonauta - Agente Secreto da O.S.T.R.A.	Célia Catunda, Kiko Mistrorigo		Animated film	
Ponto Org	Patrícia Moran		Drama	
Reis e Ratos	Mauro Lima	Selton Mello, Rodrigo Santoro, Seu Jorge, Daniel Alvim, Cauã Reymond, Rafaela Mandelli, Otávio Muller	Comedy	
Somos tão Jovens	Antônio Carlos da Fontoura	Thiago Mendonça, Bruno Torres, Júlia Lemmertz, Sandra Corveloni	Drama	
Southwest	José Eduardo Belmonte	Simone Spoladore, Julio Adrião, Victor Navega Motta	Drama	
Swirl	Helvécio Marins Jr., Clarissa Campolina	Maria da Conceição, Luciene Soares da Silva, Wanderson Soares da Silva	Drama	
Tabu	Miguel Gomes	Carloto Cotta, Teresa Madruga, Ana Moreira	Drama	Co-production with Portugal, Germany and France
Totalmente Inocentes	Rodrigo Bittencourt	Mariana Rios, Fábio Assunção, Fábio Porchat	Comedy	
Traço Concreto	Danilo Pschera, Eduardo Baggio		Documentary	
Violeta Went to Heaven	Andrés Wood	Francisca Gavilán, Gabriela Aguilera, Vanesa González, Luis Machín	Drama	Co-production with Chile and Argentina
Xingu	Cao Hamburger	Caio Blat, João Miguel, Felipe Camargo	Adventure	The film was selected for the 62nd Berlin International Film Festival.

== See also ==
- 2012 in Brazil
- 2012 in Brazilian television
