= Stronger than the World =

- Theatrical release poster
- Directed by: Afonso Poyart
- Written by: Afonso Poyart
- Produced by: Afonso Poyart
- Starring: José Loreto; Cleo Pires; Rômulo Neto
- Edited by: Lucas Gonzaga
- Production companies: Black Maria; Globo Filmes
- Distributed by: Downtown Filmes; Paris Filmes
- Release date: June 16, 2016 (United States)
- Country: Brazil
- Language: Portuguese

Camelo, Bruno (15 December 2015). "Após derrota de José Aldo, cinebiografia do lutador é adiada por tempo indeterminado". AdoroCinema.

Stronger than the World (Portuguese: Mais Forte que o Mundo - A História de José Aldo) is a 2016 Brazilian sports drama-biographical film written and directed by Afonso Poyart, about the life of MMA fighter José Aldo. It stars José Loreto, Cleo Pires, Rômulo Neto, Milhem Cortaz, Jackson Antunes, Claudia Ohana, Paloma Bernardi and Rafinha Bastos.

The idea of the film was conceived during Internet searches made by Poyart after getting a call from the director of expansion and shareholder of Paris Filmes, who proposed to Poyart the project for a feature film involving MMA. In 2011, Poyart's production company, Black Maria, was already commanding the development of the film, which had high points of standstill before completion due to problems ranging from the casting to the director's prolonged absence and engagement in Hollywood cinema.

In September 2018, the movie was nominated at the 46th International Emmy Awards for best TV Movie / Mini-Series.

== Synopsis ==
The film tells the story of José Aldo, a poor family boy, marked by domestic violence, who leaves Amazonas for Rio de Janeiro in search of a chance as an athlete. To beat opponents in the Octagon, however, he must first settle accounts with his past and overcome old traumas.

== Cast ==
- José Loreto as José Aldo
- Cleo Pires as Vivi (Viviane)
- Milhem Cortaz as Dedé Pederneiras
- Jackson Antunes as Seu José
- Claudia Ohana as Rocilene
- Rômulo Neto as Fernandinho
- Paloma Bernardi as Luiza
- Thaila Ayala as Laura
- Rafinha Bastos as Marcos Loro
- Felipe Titto as Tony Mendigo
- Paulo Zulu as Mestre Marcinho
- Robson Nunes as Marquinhos
- José Trassi as Guimba
- Dirley "Mão de Pedra" Broenstrup as UFC 129 fighter (Mark Hominick)
- Bruce Buffer as himself
- Jonathan Haagensen as drug trafficker

== Production ==
=== Pre-production ===
After seeing the trailer for 2 Coelhos in his apartment in Alto de Pinheiros in São Paulo, Sandi Adamiu, director of expansion and shareholder of Paris Filmes, called Afonso Poyart, showing his interest in developing a project involving MMA. Poyart bought the idea and said he saw in the history of UFC champion José Aldo all the elements needed: hard life, willpower, struggle for a dream, overcoming. "And he has a deal with his father, which is a remarkable story. He is a hero, but he has a facet of villain at the same time, it's ambiguous," said the director who along with Paris Films, went to the quest to buy the copyright.

In June 2011, the director and screenwriter, Afonso Poyart, in an interview with Esporte UOL reiterated that his producer Black Maria was in the pre-production of a film based on the trajectory of José Aldo. The plot would be centered on the story of the fighter, "a guy who started down there, went through needs and moved the world," Poyart said. Afonso Poyart was still involved in works related to the distribution of 2 Coelhos, thus generating a delay in the progress of the production of the cinebiography, whose provisional title at the time was "Vale Tudo - Uma História de Luta".

The development of the feature film came to various halts, with a stalled period from Poyart due to commitments made in Hollywood cinema in a drama titled Solace starring Anthony Hopkins. After a period of production recess, it was speculated that production would restart at the end of 2012 under command now of Daniel Filho, with Poyart as executive producer. In the end, Poyart even with the commitments of Solace, returned as director to the production of the biographical work. Later, Marcelo Rubens Paiva was hired to do a final treatment of the script.

=== Filming ===
With an estimated production budget of R $5 million, $1 million being an incentive investment from Ancine, The filming of Mais Forte que o Mundo began at the end of May 2015. The multi-sport center of São José dos Campos, better known as Teatrão, was one of the first filming locations. A ring was set up in the center of the theatrical gymnasium for José Loreto to interpret José Aldo's drills. In addition to the gymnasium, the façade of the São José dos Campos municipal hospital was also a recording point. In the recording, the façade of the hospital became an area of the Manaus International Airport.

In July 2015, there was a production stoppage due to a wound of José Loreto when he went to make a mortal leap and ended twisting his ankle. Other scenes were also recorded in São Paulo, São Bernardo do Campo, Santos and Rio de Janeiro. In September 2015, the last scenes were shot in Las Vegas.

=== Release ===
Stronger than the World was scheduled to launch on national circuits on January 14, 2016, by the distributors Downtown Filmes and Paris Filmes. However, the directors of the distribution companies took into account a possible failure at the box office due to UFC 194, in which Jose Aldo was defeated by the Irish fighter Conor McGregor. According to journalist Flávio Ricco, from UOL, the distributors wanted to take advantage of the Brazilian's victory to promote the biopic. Thus, the debut was postponed indefinitely, being finally released on June 16, 2016.
