= 2012 in Brazil =

Events from the year 2012 in Brazil.

== Incumbents ==
=== Federal government ===
- President: Dilma Rousseff
- Vice President: Michel Temer

=== Governors ===
- Acre: Binho Marques
- Alagoas: Teotônio Vilela Filho
- Amapa: Camilo Capiberibe
- Amazonas: Omar Aziz
- Bahia: Jaques Wagner
- Ceará: Cid Gomes
- Espírito Santo: José Roberto Arruda
- Goiás: Marconi Perillo
- Maranhão: Roseana Sarney
- Mato Grosso: Blairo Maggi
- Mato Grosso do Sul: André Puccinelli
- Minas Gerais: Aécio Neves
- Pará: Ana Júlia Carepa
- Paraíba: José Maranhão
- Paraná: Roberto Requião
- Pernambuco: Eduardo Campos
- Piauí: Wellington Dias
- Rio de Janeiro: Sérgio Cabral Filho
- Rio Grande do Norte: Wilma de Faria
- Rio Grande do Sul: Yeda Crusius
- Rondônia: Ivo Cassol
- Roraima: José de Anchieta Júnior
- Santa Catarina: Luiz Henrique da Silveira
- São Paulo: José Serra
- Sergipe: Marcelo Déda
- Tocantins: Carlos Henrique Amorim

=== Vice governors ===
- Acre: Carlos César Correia de Messias
- Alagoas: José Thomaz da Silva Nonô Neto
- Amapá: Doralice Nascimento de Souza
- Amazonas: José Melo de Oliveira
- Bahia: Otto Alencar
- Ceará: Domingos Gomes de Aguiar Filho
- Espírito Santo: Givaldo Vieira da Silva
- Goiás: José Eliton de Figueiredo Júnior
- Maranhão: Joaquim Washington Luiz de Oliveira
- Mato Grosso: Francisco Tarquínio Daltro
- Mato Grosso do Sul: Simone Tebet
- Minas Gerais: Alberto Pinto Coelho Júnior
- Pará: Helenilson Cunha Pontes
- Paraíba: Rômulo José de Gouveia
- Paraná: Flávio José Arns
- Pernambuco: João Soares Lyra Neto
- Piauí: Wilson Martins
- Rio de Janeiro: Luiz Fernando Pezão
- Rio Grande do Norte: Robinson Faria
- Rio Grande do Sul: Jorge Alberto Duarte Grill
- Rondônia: Airton Pedro Gurgacz
- Roraima: Francisco de Assis Rodrigues
- Santa Catarina: Eduardo Pinho Moreira
- São Paulo: Guilherme Afif Domingos
- Sergipe: Jackson Barreto
- Tocantins: João Oliveira de Sousa

== Events ==
=== February ===
- February 13: Lindemberg Alves Fernandes goes on trial for the death of ex-girlfriend Elóa Pimentel, in the city of Santo André.
- February 16:
  - Lindemberg Alves Fernandes is convicted of all 12 crimes with which he is charged, and sentenced to 98 years and 10 months of imprisonment; Brazilian law meant that this would be limited to 30 years.
  - The Supreme Federal Court decides that the Clean Record Law is constitutional and valid for that year's municipal elections.
- February 25: A fire destroys part of the Brazilian scientific station in Antarctica, leaving two dead and a Brazilian Navy soldier injured.
- February 29: Federal Police arrest 31 people suspected of hacking slot machines in Goiás, including businessman Carlos Augusto Ramos and Carlinhos Cachoeira.

=== March ===
- March 29: President Dilma Rousseff attends the 4th BRICS summit, held in New Delhi, India.

=== April ===
- April 7-8: The first Brazilian version of the Lollapalooza music festival is held at the Jockey Club in São Paulo.
- April 25: The Brazilian Chamber of Deputies approves the project for the New Forest Code, which reduces environmental protection.

=== May ===
- May 25: President Dilma Rousseff partially vetoed modifications to the Forest Law that protects the Amazon.

=== July ===
- July 1: The cultural landscape of the city of Rio de Janeiro is elevated to the status of Cultural Heritage of Humanity by UNESCO.

=== August ===
- August 2: The Supreme Federal Court begins the trial of the 38 defendants accused of participating in the Mensalão scandal.
- August 8: The sixth annual International Female Orgasm Day is celebrated. The holiday was established by José Arimatéia Dantas Lacerda of Esperantina.

=== September ===
- September 27: Cabo Bruno, who was accused of more than 50 murders in the 1980s, is murdered after 20 gunshots at Pindamonhangaba, São Paulo; a month after leaving prison.

=== October ===
- October 7: First round of voting in the Brazilian municipal elections, 2012.
- October 28: Second round of the Brazilian municipal elections, 2012.

=== November ===
- November 25: The 2012 Brazilian Grand Prix is held at the Autódromo José Carlos Pace in São Paulo, and is won by British driver Jenson Button for McLaren; it would be the victory of his Formula One career.

=== December ===
- December 16: Corinthians wins the 2012 FIFA Club World Cup over Chelsea, with a score of 1-0.
- December 17: The Supreme Federal Court concludes the trial of the politicians accused in the Mensalão scandal.

== Deaths ==
=== January ===
- January 2: Beatriz Bandeira, 102, activist and writer
- January 10: José Freire de Oliveira Neto, 83, Roman Catholic prelate, Bishop of Mossoró (1984–2004)
- January 30: Al Rio, 49, comic book artist, suicide.

=== February ===
- February 22: João Mansur, 88, politician, Governor of Paraná (1973).
- February 24:
  - Pery Ribeiro, 74, singer, myocardial infarction.
  - Eliana Tranchesi, 56, chief executive (Daslu).

=== March ===
- March 16: Aziz Ab'Sáber, 87, geologist, heart attack.
- March 23: Chico Anysio, 80, comedian, multiple organ failure

=== April ===
- April 14 : Paulo César Saraceni, 78, film director.
- April 26 : José Martins Ribeiro Nunes, 85, naval pilot.

=== May ===
- May 31 : Nélson Jacobina, 58, songwriter ("Maracatu Atômico"), lung cancer.

=== June ===
- June 14 : Carlos Reichenbach, 67, filmmaker, cardiac arrest.

=== July ===
- July 7 : Ronaldo Cunha Lima, 76, poet and politician, Governor of Paraíba (1991–1994), lung cancer.
- July 31 : Alfredo Ramos, 87, footballer and coach.

=== August ===
- August 24 : Félix Miélli Venerando, 74, footballer, cardiac arrest.

=== September ===
- September 19: Leopoldo Penna Franca, 53, mathematician, heart attack.
- September 27: Cabo Bruno, 53, serial killer, multiple gunshot wounds.
- September 29: Hebe Camargo, 83, television presenter, cardiac arrest.

=== October ===
- October 27: Regina Dourado, 59, actress, breast cancer.

=== November ===
- November 3: Carmélia Alves, 89, baião singer, multiple organ seizure.
- November 29: Joelmir Beting, 75, journalist and writer, stroke.

=== December ===
- December 2: Décio Pignatari, 85, poet, essayist and translator, respiratory failure.
- December 5: Oscar Niemeyer, 104, architect, respiratory infection.
- December 20: Thelma Reston, 75, actress (Entranced Earth), breast cancer.

== See also ==
- 2012 in Brazilian football
- 2012 in Brazilian television
- List of Brazilian films of 2012
