= Junji Kikawa =

Imperial Japanese Army lieutenant colonel (born 1877)

- 吉川 順治
- Born: 1877; Niigata, Japan
- Died: Unknown
- Education: Imperial Japanese Army Academy
- Spouse: Fumi Kikawa
- Children: 7
- Parents: Genshun Kikawa (father); Yio Kikawa (mother)
- Military career
- Allegiance: Empire of Japan
- Branch: Imperial Japanese Army
- Rank: Lieutenant colonel
- Nickname: "The Old Kikawa"
- Known for: Founding the Shindo Renmei
- Conflicts: Russo-Japanese War
- Other work: Dyer, association president

Junji Kikawa (吉川 順治, Kikawa Junji; born 1877) was a lieutenant colonel in the Imperial Japanese Army and the founder of the nationalist secret society Shindo Renmei.

== Biography ==
Kikawa was born in 1877 in Niigata Prefecture, Japan, to an impoverished family. He was the son of Genshun Kikawa and Yio Kikawa. Seeking to escape the widespread unemployment of the period, he pursued a career in the military. Known for his disciplined and methodical nature, Kikawa spent thirteen years at the Imperial Japanese Army Academy, where he excelled and graduated as a cavalry officer. He also fought in the Russo-Japanese War. According to accounts within the Japanese-Brazilian immigrant community, Kikawa single-handedly fought off more than ten Cossacks while isolated in enemy territory. He reportedly cut down nearly half of them, leaving a scar on his head.

In 1922, Kikawa developed myopia, which distorted his vision. Owing to his rigid education, he believed it was unacceptable for a member of the Imperial Japanese Army to suffer from a physical disability. Consequently, he made a transfer to the reserve list and retired with the rank of lieutenant colonel.

Over the next decade, Kikawa served in various occupations to support his wife and seven children. However, the economic crisis led him to emigrate to Brazil in 1933 at the age of 55, along with other military personnel. Upon arriving in 1935, he and his family settled in Rancharia, São Paulo, where he acquired land through an agricultural cooperative and invested in cotton farming. Although far from Japan, Kikawa maintained traditional Japanese customs. Each morning, he ritualistically dressed, bowed toward the rising sun in reverence to the Emperor, and prayed at a Shinto shrine dedicated to the goddess Amaterasu.

In 1940, Kikawa relocated his family to Vila Mariana, Vergueiro Street, 3427, São Paulo, becoming a dyer. Although described as an introspective and quiet man, Kikawa gained prominence within the immigrant community. In 1941, he was elected president of the Liga das Tinturarias de São Paulo.

=== Kodosha and Shindo Renmei ===
In 1938, the Estado Novo regime launched the Nationalization campaign, an authoritarian policy aimed at integrating ethnic communities by mandating the use of the Portuguese language in teaching, rendering foreign schools impracticable. With the outbreak of World War II and the attack on Pearl Harbor, anti-Japanese sentiment grew, and radicalized national security efforts prevented Japanese immigrants from passing down traditions and imperial reverence to their descendants.

In mid-1942, under the pretext of a wedding, Kikawa met with approximately 400 Japanese immigrants from across the state at the Hotel Sawaya in Marília, and founded the secret society Shindo Renmei. Other accounts date the society's foundation to July 1943 or February 1944 with the formation of the Kodosha, an organization in which Kikawa served as president. Nevertheless, operations were handled by younger members, and it is probable that these activities were conducted without Kikawa's full knowledge.

In August or September 1944, Kikawa was arrested and imprisoned by Brazilian authorities on charges of inciting arson attacks, being held at the Casa de Detenção de São Paulo. Though the Kodosha had not directly carried out the acts, its distribution of intimidating pamphlets escalated the situation. Since Kikawa was listed in the pamphlets as the leader, he was held responsible.

In May 1945, the Kodosha was renamed Shindo Renmei, and officially established in July of that year. While in prison, Kikawa agreed to serve as the official Chairman. Following Japan's surrender in August 1945, the Japanese-Brazilian community became divided between the Kachigumi, who believed that Japan had won the war, and the Makegumi, who accepted Japan's surrender. Kikawa aligned with the victory faction. He was released on 17 November 1945, and on 30 April 1949, he decided to permanently cease Shindo Renmei's activities.

After the Kachigumi murdered his close friend, Colonel Wakiyama, a Makegumi, Kikawa adopted Buddhist monk attire and prayed every day for Wakiyama's soul until his own death several years later.

Author Takeshi Suzuki recalls:

One day, Mr. Kikawa's two daughters came looking for me and handed over the ōtsuzumi that he had cherished for many years. […] The kotsuzumi we use today is a keepsake from Colonel Wakiyama of the recognition faction, while the ōtsuzumi is a keepsake from Lieutenant Colonel Kikawa of the victory faction.

== Bibliography ==
- da Silva, Carlos Leonardo Bahiense (2006). Em nome do imperador: reflexões sobre a Shindo Renmei e sua campanha pela preservação da etnicidade japonesa (1937-1950) (PDF) (Master's dissertation) (in Portuguese). Rio de Janeiro: Universidade Federal Rural do Rio de Janeiro.
- André, Richard Gonçalves; Shoji, Rafael (2025). "Aspectos não institucionais das religiões japonesas no Brasil antes da década de 1950: reconsiderando o "paradigma Maeyama"". Revista Brasileira de História das Religiões (in Portuguese). 18 (53): 1–20. doi:10.18764/1983-2850v18n53e26226.
- Okubaro, Jorge J. (2006). Terceiro Nome (ed.). O súdito (Banzai, Massateru!) (in Portuguese). ISBN 9788578162283.
- Dezem, Rogério Akiti (2020). "Tempos sombrios para os imigrantes japoneses no Brasil (1941-1948)" (PDF). ブラジル研究 [Revista de Estudos Brasileiros] (in Portuguese). 16: 1–21. hdl:11094/106603.
- Suzuki, Takeshi (1986). コロニア芸能史 [Colônia Geinou Shi] (PDF) (in Japanese). São Paulo: Editora Gráfica Topan Press Ltda.
