= Lula Carvalho =

Brazilian cinematographer

- Born: 1977 (age 48–49); Rio de Janeiro, Brazil
- Years active: 1996–present

Lula Carvalho, ASC is a Brazilian cinematographer.

His body of work includes Brazilian productions like Elite Squad (2007) and its sequel (2010), as well as American productions like RoboCop (2014) and Teenage Mutant Ninja Turtles (2014).

As of 2022, Carvalho is a member of the American Society of Cinematographers.

== Career ==
Carvalho grew up on film sets, working with his father, the acclaimed cinematographer Walter Carvalho. He learned how to load film magazines for the camera department at age of 10, started working as a second camera assistant upon finishing high school and became a professional first photographer assistant at age of 20.

Carvalho pulled focus on over nineteen acclaimed Brazilian features, including Fernando Meirelles' City of God, Walter Salles' Behind the Sun, and Héctor Babenco's Carandiru.

During this time, Carvalho also worked at second units as a cinematographer and as a camera operator on features. He also completed cinematography and still photography classes at New York University and the School of Visual Arts in New York.

In 2005, Carvalho shot his first feature as a cinematographer, Incuráveis, directed by Gustavo Accioli. He went on to shoot Elite Squad, directed by José Padilha which won the Golden Bear at the 2008 Berlin Film Festival.

In 2008, Carvalho was awarded the Best Cinematography Prize by both the Brazilian Cinema Academy and the International Press Correspondents Association in Brazil (ACIE) for Elite Squad, which also led him to a nomination in the 2008 Camerimage Festival, in Poland. Elite Squad: The Enemy Within, the follow-up to Elite Squad, and Carvalho was once again awarded the Best Cinematography Prize by both the Brazilian Cinema Academy and the International Press Correspondents Association in Brazil (ACIE), in 2011. In 2008 Carvalho shot the Argentinian Production Felicitas and was finalist for the Condor Award 2010 for that.

In 2012, Carvalho shot the science fiction RoboCop, his first American feature. In 2013, he shot Teenage Mutant Ninja Turtles, as well as its sequel in 2016. And in 2014, he shot the Netflix series Narcos, in Colombia.

In 2013, Carvalho won the ABC (Association of the Brazilian Cinematographers) Award for the movie A Wolf at the Door, and again won the ABC Award for Bingo: The King of the Mornings in 2015.

In 2017, Carvalho shot episodes of the Netflix's Narcos Mexico, The Mechanism and the Brazilian documentary Police Killing which won the first prize of It Is All True Film Festival, participated in the IDFA festival and was short listed for the Academy’s best documentary.

In 2019 shot the non-fictional Amazon Series All Or Nothing following the Brazilian national soccer team throughout its participation at the South American Cup.

He is now based in Brooklyn, New York.

== Filmography ==
=== Short film ===
Year	Title	Director	Notes
2004	Uma Estrela pra Ioiô	Bruno Safadi	
2004	A Última Fábrica	Felipe Nepomuceno	
2007	Trópico das Cabras	Fernando Coimbra	
2014	Useless Landscape	José Padilha	Segment of Rio, I Love You
2015	Blume	Felipe Nepomuceno	
2019	Estrondo	Felipe Nepomuceno	
2020	Cidade Inerte	Vellas	
2026	Buyback	Jared Goodman	

=== Feature film ===
Year	Title	Director
2005	Incuráveis	Gustavo Acioli
2007	Elite Squad	José Padilha
2007	Meu Nome É Dindi	Bruno Safadi
2008	The Dead Girl's Feast	Matheus Nachtergaele
2008	December	Selton Mello
2009	Budapest	Walter Carvalho
2009	Felicitas	María Teresa Costantini
2010	Elite Squad: The Enemy Within	José Padilha
2011	Juras Eternas 2	Luiz Henrique Rios; Rosane Svartman
2011	Estamos Juntos	Toni Venturi
2011	A Hora e a Vez de Augusto Matraga	Vinicius Coimbra
2012	Artificial Paradises	Marcos Prado
2012	À Beira do Caminho	Breno Silveira
2013	Éden	Bruno Safadi
2013	A Wolf at the Door	Fernando Coimbra
2014	RoboCop	José Padilha
2014	Teenage Mutant Ninja Turtles	Jonathan Liebesman
2016	Teenage Mutant Ninja Turtles: Out of the Shadows	Dave Green
2017	Bingo: The King of the Mornings	Daniel Rezende
2018	Entebbe	José Padilha
2018	10 Segundos para Vencer	José Alvarenga Jr.
2025	Ary	André Weller
2026	Iconoclast	Gabriel Basso

=== Documentary film ===
Year	Title	Director	Notes
2006	Moacir Arte Bruta	Walter Carvalho	
2006	Fabricando Tom Zé	Décio Matos Júnior	
2009	Domingos	Maria Ribeiro	With Manuel Águas
2010	Secrets of the Tribe	José Padilha	With Reynaldo Zangrandi
2011	Carta Para o Futuro	Renato Martins	Also producer
2012	Raul - O Início, o Fim e o Meio	Walter Carvalho; Leonardo Gudel	
2017	Um Filme de Cinema	Walter Carvalho	With Bacco Andrade, Pablo Baião, Jacques Cheuiche and Pedro von Krüger
2018	Auto de Resistência	Himself; Natasha Neri	
2018	Eduardo Galeano Vagamundo	Felipe Nepomuceno	With Breno Cunha, Guga Millet and Pedro von Krüger

Documentary short

Year	Title	Director	Notes
2001	Atrocidades Maravilhosas	Himself; Renato Martins; Pedro Peregrino	
2006	Brasil	Felipe Nepomuceno	
2013	O Sonho de Ser Camisa 10	Pedro von Krüger	With Jacques Cheuiche
2014	Caetana	Felipe Nepomuceno; Pedro von Krüger	

=== Television ===
Year	Title	Director	Notes
2006	Estúdio 66		
2011	Força-Tarefa	José Alvarenga Jr. Rogério Gomes	2 episodes
2011	Falcón	Pete Travis	Episode "The Blind Man of Seville"
2015	Narcos	José Padilha; Guillermo Navarro; Andrés Baiz; Fernando Coimbra	8 episodes
2018	The Mechanism	José Padilha	Episode "Lava Jato"
2020	Narcos: Mexico	Andrés Baiz	Episode "Salva El Tigre"
2020	26 Poemas Hoje		
2023	The Gilded Age	Michael Engler; Crystle Roberson	4 episodes
2025-2026	The Night Agent	Guy Ferland; Ana Lily Amirpour; Millicent Shelton; Paris Barclay; Billy Gierhart	12 episodes
