= Shindo Renmei =

Terrorist organization in São Paulo, Brazil

Shindo Renmei (Japanese: 臣道連盟; League of the Way of Emperors' Subjects) was a nationalist organization composed of Japanese immigrants. It was active in the state of São Paulo, Brazil during the 1940s. Refusing to believe the news of Japan's surrender at the end of World War II, some of its most fanatic members used violence against those who did surrender. Shindo Renmei killed at least 23 people, all of whom were Japanese Brazilians, and wounded 147 others.

== Background ==
The first Japanese emigrated to Brazil in 1908, hoping to amass wealth and then return to Japan. They found themselves in a foreign country with different languages, religions, climate, food, and customs. As a result, they were relatively isolated from the culture around them, and few learned Portuguese. As a result, the general public regarded them with suspicion. By the 1930s, Brazil had the world's largest Japanese immigrant community.

The Estado Novo regime established by Getúlio Vargas, aiming to promote Brazilian nationalism, repressed the Japanese Brazilians, Italian Brazilians and German Brazilians. The decree 383 of April 18, 1938 mandated that foreigners were not allowed to take part in political activities or speak foreign languages in public. Additionally, the first language taught to children had to be Portuguese. Radio broadcast in foreign languages was also forbidden. Publishing in foreign languages was only allowed in bilingual editions.

At the time, almost 90% of the Japanese immigrants were subscribers of Japanese language newspapers, which indicates a much higher literacy rate than the general populace at the time. Decree 383, which made bilingual editions obligatory, in effect required such newspapers to stop printing due to the resulting high costs. As a significant number of Japanese immigrants could not understand Portuguese, it became exceedingly difficult for them to obtain any extra-communal information.

When Brazil sided with the Allies in 1942, all communication with Japan was cut off and the entry of new Japanese immigrants was forbidden. Letters from Japan would no longer reach their recipients. Japanese-Brazilians were unable to travel freely or live in certain regions, such as coastal areas, without safe conduct from the authorities. Radio receivers were also confiscated, making it almost impossible for Japanese-Brazilians to listen to shortwave transmissions from Japan. Even bilingual newspapers were prohibited during this period.

== Foundation ==
Shindo Renmei was not the only, nor the first, political organization founded by Japanese-Brazilians. Most of these organizations provided mutual support for the community.

Junji Kikawa

The Japanese Catholics Keizo Ishihara, Margarida Watanabe, and Massaru Takahashi founded the Pia ("pious"), a charity created with the approval of the church and the Brazilian government to help the poorer members of the diaspora. A former Japanese army colonel, Junji Kikawa, was active in the Pia. In 1942, after a violent altercation between Japanese and Brazilians in Marília, Kikawa founded Shindo Renmei, and campaigned for the Japanese community to commit acts of sabotage. He distributed pamphlets urging Japanese-Brazilian farmers to cease producing silk (used at time to make parachutes) and peppermint (menthol was used in the production of explosives). As Pia's directors opposed this campaign, Kikawa left Pia in 1944.

Shindo Renmei had its headquarters in São Paulo, with 64 local offices in the states of São Paulo and Paraná. It was sponsored by donations from its affiliates.

With the end of World War II, Shindo Renmei refused to believe the official news of Japan's defeat. Believing it to be nothing but American propaganda, Shindo Renmei's members established new goals: to punish the defeatists, to declare that Japan had won or was winning the war, and defend the emperor's honor.

In Shindo Renmei's eyes, the Japanese-Brazilian community was divided in two groups:

- Kachigumi, or "the victorious", who believed the war was still going on, or that Japan had won. They were the majority mostly from the poorer members of the community and those who still intended to return to Japan.
- Makegumi, or "the defeated" pejoratively called "dirty hearts", who had accepted the news of Japan's defeat. They were usually the wealthier members of the community who were more informed and better adapted to Brazilian society.

Compounding the confusion, a number of deceivers produced fake Japanese newspapers and magazines with news stories about the "great victory" and started selling land in the "conquered territories". Others sold yen, the Japanese currency nearly worthless at the time, to those who intended to return to Japan. This drove many Kachigumis into bankruptcy and even to suicide in some cases.

== Terrorist actions ==
Shindo Renmei's members believed that the news regarding Japan's defeat was false, and they created a communication system to declare that Japan had actually won. Underground Japanese-language newspapers and magazines were published and secret radio stations were established to push this view.

The group also wrote lists with the names of makegumis who should die for betraying the emperor.

Kamegoro Ogasawara, owner of a dry cleaner in São Paulo, coordinated the punitive actions. Many Japanese-owned boarding houses served as hideouts for the killers after their actions.

Shindo Renmei's killers, or tokkotai, were always young people. They sent letters to their intended targets before a murder, urging them to commit seppuku – ritual suicide by sword – so that they could "regain their lost honor". The letters started by saying: "You have a dirty heart, so you must have the throat washed"; this essentially means to be cut by a katana.

Not one of those who received such a letter complied with the request. Thus, they were killed with firearms or katanas. From 1946 to early 1947, Shindo Renmei killed 23 and wounded 147 Japanese-Brazilians, according to official data. The killers often surrendered to the police soon after their crimes, explaining that they had nothing against Brazil or its people, and that they were not common criminals, for they killed only as part of their duty.

== Repression and end ==
Tales of murder, especially by katana sword, spread fear among Japanese-Brazilians. The general Brazilian population was not directly affected, though it was left with the impression that all Japanese were nationalist fanatics.

Bursts of violence against Japanese immigrants, belonging to Shindo Renmei or not, occurred mostly in towns on the countryside where they had large communities, such as in the region of Tupã, São Paulo. After two attacks by Shindo Renmei and the murder of a Brazilian truck driver by a Japanese truck driver on 31 July 1946, a massive crowd in Osvaldo Cruz rioted and was willing to lynch any Japanese they found. The riot was contained only with the arrival of army troops.

The army and the Departamento Estadual de Ordem Política e Social (DOPS - State Department of Political and Social Order) investigated the case in the states of São Paulo and Paraná. According to the police of São Paulo, 31,380 Japanese-Brazilians were suspected of having connections to the organization. DOPS also investigated 376 Japanese-Brazilians. Ultimately, the leaders of Shindo Renmei and most of the tokkotai were arrested.

About 155 Japanese immigrants were to be banished from Brazil in 1946, but this never happened, and the time for punishment elapsed. Only 14 tokkotai were convicted of murder.

After many decades, Shindo Renmei is still somewhat of a taboo among Japanese-Brazilian immigrants.

== In popular culture ==
- Dirty Hearts, a Brazilian film from 2011 about the Shindo Renmei

== See also ==
- Japanese holdout
- Terrorism in Brazil
