= Sand Castle (film) =

2017 American war drama film

- Official poster
- Directed by: Fernando Coimbra
- Written by: Chris Roessner
- Produced by: Mark Gordon; Justin Nappi; Ben Pugh
- Starring: Nicholas Hoult; Logan Marshall-Green; Henry Cavill; Glen Powell; Beau Knapp; Neil Brown Jr.; Tommy Flanagan
- Cinematography: Ben Richardson
- Edited by: Zach Staenberg
- Music by: Adam Peters
- Production companies: 42; Treehouse Pictures
- Distributed by: Netflix
- Release date: April 21, 2017
- Running time: 113 minutes
- Country: United States
- Language: English

Sand Castle is a 2017 American war drama film directed by Fernando Coimbra and written by Chris Roessner. The film stars Nicholas Hoult, Logan Marshall-Green, Henry Cavill, Glen Powell, Tommy Flanagan, Beau Knapp, and Neil Brown Jr. The film centers on Matt Ocre, a young soldier in the United States Army, who is tasked with restoring water to a village in Iraq. It is inspired by Roessner's experience as a soldier in the Iraq War. It was released on April 21, 2017, on Netflix.

== Plot ==
At the beginning of the 2003 Iraq War, Private Matt Ocre, a young civil affairs soldier with the Army Reserve slams his hand in the door of a Humvee in an attempt to get sent home. Narration reveals that he enlisted in July 2001, in order to get money for college. His identity and personal struggles, along with his repressed desires, contributing to the unraveling of the story. Some time later, he is seen with a cast on his arm, his attempt having been unsuccessful. His cast gets cut off just in time to be sent to Baghdad. During the battle, Ocre spots a sniper and Sergeant Dylan Chutsky calls in a helicopter strike that destroys the building the sniper is in.

The film then skips forward to some time after the battle, when Ocre's squad is tasked with repairing a broken water system in the dangerous village of Baqubah. They arrive in the village and meet up with a Special Forces unit led by Captain Syverson (whom Ocre sees as a father figure). Syverson introduces them to their interpreter and explains that they are to travel to the pump station and fill a tanker with water to bring back to the village every day. At the station, the Army engineers working on the pump explain that it will take many weeks to finish repairs, but that the repairs would go much faster if Staff Sergeant Harper could recruit some of the villagers to help. During the return trip, a vehicle is spotted coming up behind them at high speed. They stop the vehicle and interrogate the driver, but learn he is taking his young daughter to another village for medicine. Back at the village, they inform the locals that they will pay anyone who shows up to work the next morning. However, when the morning comes, there is no one there by the time they are ready to leave. With no labor forthcoming from the village, they are forced to help the engineers themselves. During another water trip, they are attacked by several insurgents with small arms, who shoot holes in the tank. The next day, while passing out water, gunfire breaks out. They engage in a pitched firefight with several enemy shooting from the rooftops, during which Chutsky is killed.

After finally getting help from Kadeer, the administrator of the local school, who desperately needs water to keep the school open, they begin making better progress on the station. One morning, none of the Iraqis show up to work and the squad returns to the village, where they find the administrator's body burned and tied to a stake in the schoolyard. The administrator's brother Arif angrily tells Syverson where the insurgents have been meeting. A plan is quickly formed to attack them that night. The attacks succeeds, killing several enemy and capturing more, but Corporal Enzo and Sergeant Burton are both injured and need to be evacuated by helicopter. Work on the pump station finally resumes, with Arif bringing in a crew of local workers. However, soon after, the pump station is hit by an improvised explosive device brought by one of the workers in a suicide bombing, destroying all of the work done by the group and killing several Americans and Iraqis.

Ocre and Harper return to their base in Baghdad. Harper is given three weeks leave, and Ocre is told he is going home. Ocre protests, but is overruled. Later that day, he is escorted to the airfield by Harper and Sergeant Major MacGregor. After asking MacGregor if it is a beautiful day for the infantry and receiving an enthusiastic affirmation, he boards the plane.

== Cast ==
- Nicholas Hoult as PVT Matt Ocre
- Logan Marshall-Green as SGT Harper
- Henry Cavill as CPT Syverson
- Glen Powell as SGT Chutsky
- Neil Brown Jr. as CPL Enzo
- Beau Knapp as SGT Burton
- Sammy Sheik as Machmoud
- Gonzalo Menendez as Medic Haring
- Sam Spruell as 1LT Anthony
- Navid Negahban as Kadeer
- Tommy Flanagan as SGM McGregor

== Production ==
Chris Roessner's script Sand Castle, based on his own experience as a machine gunner in Iraq's Sunni Triangle, appeared among the 2012 unproduced Black List screenplays. On March 13, 2014, it was announced that Nicholas Hoult would lead the cast of the Iraq war drama to play the role of Matt Ocre, a young machine gunner. The film would be produced by Mark Gordon through The Mark Gordon Company, who had bought the script. Commercial director Seb Edwards was hired to direct the film centered on Sergeant Harper, the leader of a platoon, and one of his soldiers, Ocre. On May 9, 2014 uMedia came on board to finance the film and handle the international sales. Additionally. Toby Kebbell was cast in the film to play Sergeant Harper.

On October 8, 2015 Luke Evans and Henry Cavill joined the film with Evans playing Sergeant Harper and Cavill playing Captain Syverson from Special Forces who runs the operation in the dangerous village of Baqubah. Fernando Coimbra, director of A Wolf at the Door, was now set to direct the film which Treehouse Pictures would fully finance and produce, while other producers would be Roessner, Gordon, Justin Nappi, and 42's Ben Pugh. Voltage Pictures took over handling the international sales. On October 9, 2015 Beau Knapp joined the film to play a sergeant who has to repair a broken water system in a village. On October 14, 2015 Glen Powell was cast in the film to play Sergeant Falvy, a tough-minded soldier. On October 26, 2015 The Hollywood Reporter confirmed that Logan Marshall-Green had replaced Evans for his role of Sergeant Harper, the leader of a platoon. On October 29, 2015 Neil Brown Jr. joined the film to play the role of Enzo. Tommy Flanagan was cast in the film for a lead role of Sgt. McGregor.

Principal photography on the film began on November 2, 2015.

== Release ==
In May 2016, Netflix acquired the distribution rights to the film. The film was released on April 21, 2017.

=== Critical reception ===
On Rotten Tomatoes, Sand Castle has an approval rating of 47% based on 17 reviews, with an average rating of 5.3/10. On Metacritic, the film has a score 45 out of 100, based on 7 critics, indicating "mixed or average reviews".
