= Paulo Tiefenthaler =

Swiss Brazilian actor (born 1968)

- Born: Paulo Tiefenthaler; June 25, 1968 (age 56); Chur, Switzerland
- Citizenship: Switzerland; Brazil
- Occupation: Actor
- Years active: 1998–present
- Children: 1

Paulo Tiefenthaler (born June 25, 1968) is a Swiss Brazilian actor.

== Biography ==
Paulo Tiefenthaler was born in Chur, Switzerland, during a trip of his parents in Europe, but he was raised in Rio de Janeiro. He is of Portuguese, German and Swiss descent.

== Career ==
Paulo holds a degree in journalism, worked as a photographer. He was also a cinematographer, assistant director and screenwriter on Manchete and GloboNews. As an actor, he made soap operas at Globo Network and performed in the theater, in plays like A alma boa de Setsuan (directed by Domingos de Oliveira) and O Homem Proibido (directed by Antônio Abujamra).

His career only took off in 2008, when he created the character Paulo Oliveira, presenter of the Larica Total cooking program, Channel Brasil. The success of the program, which was voted best humorous of 2009 by the jury of the Paulista Association of Art Critics, led to invitations to other television programs and to the movies.

He directed in 2005 the short documentary Jorjão, about the drum master of the samba school Mocidade Independente de Padre Miguel, Unidos do Viradouro e Imperatriz Leopoldinense. In 2011, he performed his second short, A Peruca de Aquiles.

== Filmography ==
=== Film ===
| Year | Film | Role |
|---|---|---|
| 1998 | Orfeu | |
| 2013 | O Lobo atrás da Porta | |
| 2014 | Trinta | Fernando Pamplona |
| 2014 | A Noite da Virada | Duda |
| 2015 | Mulheres no Poder | Stefan |
| 2016 | O Roubo da Taça | Peralta |

=== Television ===
| Year | Program | Channel | Role |
|---|---|---|---|
| 2001-2002 | O Clone | Rede Globo | Butler |
| 2008-2013 | Larica Total | Canal Brasil | Paulo Oliveira |
| 2011 | Rockgol | MTV | |
| 2012 | Suburbia | Rede Globo | Costa |
| 2012 | (fdp) | HBO | Carvalhosa |
| 2014 | Amor Verissimo | GNT | Vários |
| 2014 | Dupla Identidade | Rede Globo | Nelson |
| 2016 | Terminadores | Rede Bandeirantes and TNT | César |
| 2016 | Haja Coração | Rede Globo | Rodrigo Furtado |
| 2016 | Bipolar | Canal Brasil | |
| 2024 | Família é Tudo | Rede Globo | Pedro Mancini |
