= Between Valleys =

2012 Brazilian drama film

- Theatrical release poster
- Directed by: Philippe Barcinski
- Written by: Philippe Barcinski; Fabiana Werneck Barcinski
- Starring: Melissa Vettore; Ângelo Antônio; Daniel Hendler
- Cinematography: Walter Carvalho
- Production companies: Pacto Audiovisual; Aurora Filmes; Cordón Films; Augenschein Filmproduktion
- Distributed by: Imovision (Brazil)
- Release date: September 2012 (Festival do Rio)
- Running time: 80 minutes
- Countries: Brazil; Germany; Uruguay
- Language: Portuguese

Between Valleys (Portuguese: Entre Vales) is a Brazilian drama film in co-production with Germany and Uruguay. It premiered at the Festival do Rio in September 2012. It was also screened at the Festlatino - "Latin American Film Festival of São Paulo" and at the Seattle International Film Festival. A premiere took place in the city of Paulínia, where some scenes were filmed in April 2013.

== Plot ==
Vicente is an economist, father of Caio and married with Marina, a dedicated dentist. He leads an ordinary life both at home and work. However, a loss followed by another ultimately leads him to a life completely miserable. He changes his name and starts living in a garbage dump.

== Cast ==
- Ângelo Antônio as Antônio / Vicente
- Daniel Hendler as Carlos
- Clayton Mariano as Edimilson
