= (fdp) =

2012 Brazilian television series

- Genre: Comedy drama
- Starring: Eucir de Souza; Paulo Tiefenthaler; Vitor Moretti; Maria Cecília Audi; Cynthia Falabella; Fernanda Franceschetto; Adrian Verdaguer; Walter Breda; Flavio Tolezani; Domingas Person; Chris Couto; Carlos Meceni; Gustavo Machado; Saulo Vasconcelos
- Country of origin: Brazil
- Original language: Portuguese
- No. of seasons: 1
- No. of episodes: 13

Production
- Production companies: Prodigo Filmes; HBO Latin America

Original release
- Network: HBO Brasil; HBO Latin America
- Release: 26 August – 18 November 2012

(fdp) is a Brazilian comedy-drama television series created by José Roberto Torero and Marcus Aurelius Pimenta and produced by HBO Latin America in partnership with Prodigo Films.

The series premiered on HBO Brasil and HBO Latin America on 26 August 2012 and follows the story of Juarez Gomes da Silva, a Brazilian soccer referee in the pursuit of his biggest dream to whistle a game of the World Cup. Seeking to accomplish his goals, he ended up chosen to act in one of the Copa Libertadores games. But while his career grows, his personal life begins to go through problems, which can compromise his future.

== Cast and characters ==
- Eucir de Souza as Juarez Gomes da Silva
- Paulo Tiefenthaler as Carvalhosa
- Vitor Moretti as Vinny
- Maria Cecília Audi as Rosali
- Cynthia Falabella as Manuela
- Fernanda Franceschetto as Vitória da Matta
- Adrian Verdaguer as Guzman
- Walter Breda
- Flavio Tolezani
- Domingas Person
- Chris Couto as Gilda Marques
- Ângelo Vizarro Jr. as Paiva Jr.
- Carlos Meceni as Ladislau Caponero
- Gustavo Machado as Rui Zwiebel
- Saulo Vasconcelos as Sérgio Balado
