= Carnival Is Over =

2024 film directed by Fernando Coimbra

- Theatrical release poster
- Portuguese: Os Enforcados
- Directed by: Fernando Coimbra
- Written by: Fernando Coimbra
- Starring: Leandra Leal; Pepê Rapazote
- Cinematography: Ulisses Malta Jr.
- Edited by: Karen Harley
- Production companies: Gullane; Fado Filmes; Videodrome; Globo Filmes; Telecine
- Distributed by: Paris Filmes (Brazil)
- Release dates: 6 September 2024 (TIFF); 14 August 2025 (Brazil); 1 January 2026 (Portugal)
- Running time: 123 minutes
- Countries: Brazil; Portugal
- Language: Portuguese
- Budget: €3 million

Carnival Is Over (Portuguese: Os Enforcados, lit. 'The Hanged') is a 2024 crime thriller film written and directed by Fernando Coimbra, starring Leandra Leal and Pêpê Rapazote as a couple hoping to escape their family's mafia ties. The film was selected to premiere as a Special Presentation at the Toronto International Film Festival on September 6, 2024.

== Premise ==
Regina and Valério conspire to kill Valério's uncle in an attempt to break free of the family's links to the mafia, initiating a cascade of chaos and violence.

== Cast ==
- Leandra Leal as Regina
- Pepê Rapazote as Valério
- Irandhir Santos

== Production ==
Coimbra first announced Carnival is Over, then titled The Hanged, at the 2018 Cannes Film Festival. At the time, Fernanda Torres was attached to star as Regina. The project had been developed at the 2015 Sundance Screenwriter Lab and production was supported by a Sundance Institute global filmmaking award. In May 2023, Variety reported that post-production on the film was underway.

== Release ==
Carnival is Over premiered in the Special Presentations section of the Toronto International Film Festival on September 6, 2024. The film was commercially released on August 14, 2025, in Brazilian theaters. The Portuguese theatrical release was scheduled for January 1, 2026.
