= Lá na Minha Terra =

- Genre: Telenovela
- Created by: Mário Teixeira
- Written by: Marcos Lazarini; Letícia Mey; Mariana Torres; Pedro Alvarenga; Raul Damasceno
- Directed by: Allan Fiterman
- Starring: Dira Paes; Mateus Solano; Daniel de Oliveira; Camila Morgado; Jesuíta Barbosa; Leandro Daniel; Arianne Botelho; Lília Cabral
- Theme music composer: Petrúcio Amorim; Marron Brasileiro; Rogério Rangel
- Opening theme: "Deus do Barro" by João Gomes feat. Juliana Linhares
- Country of origin: Brazil
- Original language: Portuguese

Production
- Executive producer: Lucas Zardo
- Producer: Mariana Pinheiro
- Production company: Estúdios Globo

Original release
- Network: TV Globo
- Release: 9 November 2026 – present

Lá na Minha Terra is a Brazilian telenovela created by Mário Teixeira. It premiered on TV Globo on 9 November 2026. The telenovela stars Dira Paes, Mateus Solano, Daniel de Oliveira, Camila Morgado, Jesuíta Barbosa, Leandro Daniel, Arianne Botelho and Lília Cabral.

== Cast ==
- Dira Paes as Rosenda Maria Madeira
- Mateus Solano as Almerindo Mourão
- Daniel de Oliveira as Severino Madeira / Cesário Ávila
- Camila Morgado as Ismália Ávila
- Lília Cabral as Celestina Arjan Guerreiro
- Arianne Botelho as Maria Lina Madeira
- Danilo Mesquita as Francisco Gerardo da Conceição Evangelista
- Jesuíta Barbosa as Daniel Alencar
- Giulia Benite as Alice
- Miguel Rômulo as Damaso
- Vicenthe Delgado as Dodô
- Jéssica Marques as Brícia
- Nina Tomsic as Lucijane
- Carol Pinheiro as Águeda
- Thardelly Lima as Biró
- Clarissa Pinheiro
- Gabriela Loran
- Débora Nascimento
- Leandro Daniel
- Luís Miranda
- Mariana Lima
- Julia Dalavia}
- Felipe Simas
- Alana Cabral
- Suely Franco
- Neusa Borges
- Lucy Alves
- Jaime Leibovitch
- Cris Larin
- Olívia Araújo
- Igor Lorenzo
- Castorine
- Leticia Vieira
- Welder Rodrigues
- Rhaisa Batista
- Gustavo Vaz
- Suzy Lopes
- Gustavo Falcão
- Elis Cabral
- Alane Dias

== Production ==
Following the success of Mário Teixeira's No Rancho Fundo, TV Globo announced during its 2026 Upfront presentation Teixeira's next telenovela, tentatively titled Terra da Garoa, and confirmed that it will air in the "6 PM slot", replacing A Nobreza do Amor. Allan Fiterman was tapped to direct the telenovela, once again working with Teixeira. In March 2026, the telenovela's title was changed to Lá na Minha Terra. Filming began in late August 2026.

== Ratings ==
Season	Episodes	First aired		Last aired		Avg. viewers (points)
Season	Episodes	Date	Viewers (points)	Date	Viewers (points)	Avg. viewers (points)
1	TBA	9 November 2026	18.6	TBA	TBD	TBD
