= The Dead Girl's Feast =

- Promotional Poster
- Directed by: Matheus Nachtergaele
- Written by: Matheus Nachtergaele; Hilton Lacerda
- Produced by: Vania Catani; André Montenegro; Rui Pires
- Starring: Daniel de Oliveira; Juliano Cazarre; Jackson Antunes; Cassia Kiss; Dira Paes
- Cinematography: Lula Carvalho
- Edited by: Cao Guimarães; Karen Harley
- Music by: Matheus Nachtergaele
- Release date: 11 June 2009
- Running time: 115 minutes
- Country: Brazil
- Language: Brazilian Portuguese

The Dead Girl's Feast (Portuguese: A Festa da Menina Morta) is a 2009 feature film directed by actor and first-time director Matheus Nachtergaele. It premiered at the 2008 Cannes Film Festival. Filming took place in the municipality of Barcelos, in the state of Amazonas

The film won two APCA Awards: one for Best Fiction Film, the other for best cinematography.

== Plot ==
Every year, for the last 20 years, The Dead Girls Feast has been celebrated in a small riverside community in the upper part of the Rio Negro, in the Amazon. The occasion commemorates the ingenuous miracle that was performed by the Saint, a local boy who, soon after suffering his mother's suicide, recovered the shredded and bloodstained remains of a missing girl's dress from the mouth of a stray dog. The little girl's remains were never found, but the remains of her dress were enshrined, by the Saint, to create a place of worship and pilgrimage in his home.

The practices of the cult and the annual feast evolved over the years into a huge enterprise, despite persistent objections from the dead girls' brother, Tadeu. These days, the inhabitants of nearby Amazon villages visit the small town on the holy day to worship, pray and beg, as they anxiously await the girl's revelations, which are to be channeled by the Saint.

The saint's father is eager to exploit every opportunity to profit from the event and from his son's growing reputation in the region, even as he carries out a casually incestuous relationship with his son. The devout aunt lives as a surrogate mother in service to the Saint and keeps her concerns about his incestuous private life a secret. The doting women, Das Graças, and the young novice, Lucia, do their best to maintain order and decency in the household shrine, which occasionally results in bouts of madness.

On the day of the feast, Tadeu steps back into his role of literally propping up the entranced Saint through a procession to the riverside. A hush goes over the largest gathering ever in attendance as the Saint steps up to the microphone to utter the Dead Girl's annual message.

== Cast ==
- Daniel de Oliveira - Santinho (The Saint)
- Juliano Cazarré - Tadeu (brother of the Dead Girl)
- Jackson Antunes - Pai (Santinho's Father)
- Cássia Kis - Mother/Figure of the Mother
- Dira Paes - Diana
- Paulo José - Padre (Priest)
- Ednelza Sahdo - Tia (Aunt)
- Rosa Malagueta - Malagueta
- Francisco Mendes - Anderson
