= Ângelo Antônio =

Brazilian actor (born 1964)

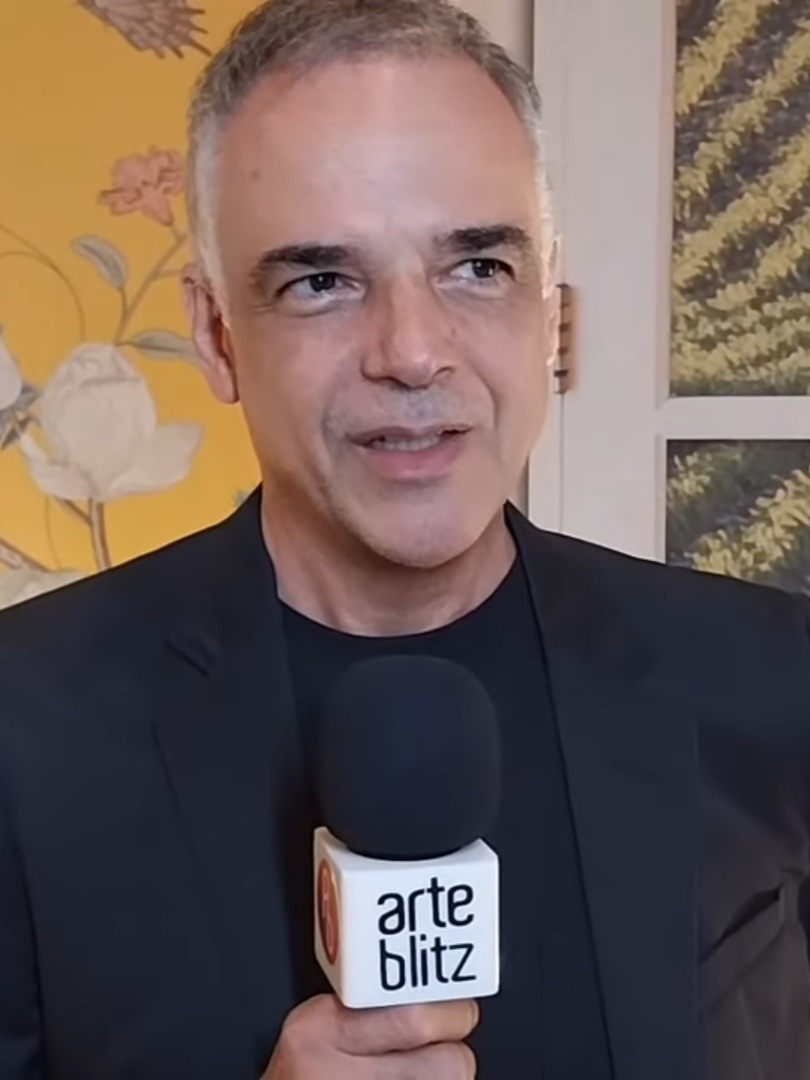
- Antônio in 2023
- Born: Ângelo Antônio Carneiro Lopes; 4 June 1964 (age 61); Curvelo, Minas Gerais, Brazil
- Occupation: Actor
- Years active: 1986–present
- Spouse: Letícia Sabatella (m. 1991; div. 2003)
- Children: 1

Ângelo Antônio Carneiro Lopes (born 4 June 1964) is a Brazilian actor.

== Selected filmography ==
=== Film ===
List of film appearances, with year, title, and role shown
Year	Title	Role	Notes
2005	Two Sons of Francisco	Francisco José de Camargo	
2006	Baptism of Blood	Friar Oswaldo	
2010	Chico Xavier	Chico Xavier (1931–1959)	
2013	Between Valleys	Antônio / Vicente	
2012	À Beira do Caminho	Afonso	

=== Television ===
List of televisionfilm appearances, with year, title, and role shown
Year	Title	Role	Notes
1990	Pantanal	Alcides	1 episode
1991	O Farol	Zoroastro	11 episodes
1991	O Dono do Mundo	Guilherme (Beija Flor)	1 episode
1993–2000	Você Decide	Various roles	7 episodes
1995	Engraçadinha: Seus Amores e Seus Pecados	Sílvio	12 episodes
1999	Suave Veneno	Adelmo	209 episodes
2000	O Cravo e a Rosa	Edmundo das Neves	
2001–02	Brava Gente	Various roles	5 episodes
2002	Sítio do Picapau Amarelo	Mario Machado	1 episode
2003	A Casa das Sete Mulheres	Tito Livio Zambeccari	7 episodes
2004	Um Só Coração	Madiano Mattei	52 episodes
2005	Alma Gêmea	Dr. Eduardo	13 episodes
2006–07	Páginas da Vida	Miroel	117 episodes
2007–08	Duas Caras	Dorgival	58 episodes
2008	Casos e Acasos	Fábio / Rogério	2 episodes
2009–10	Cama de Gato	Davi Brandão	140 episodes
2010	As Cariocas	Carlinhos	1 episode
2010–11	Araguai	Geraldo Luti	5 episodes
2011	A Vida da Gente	Marcos Prates	40 episodes
2012	As Brasileiras	Samuel	1 episode
2013	Joia Rara	Tenpa Ningpo	3 episodes
2014	A Teia	Luiz Germano	10 episodes
2015	Sete Vidas	Sete Vidas	3 episodes
2016	Justiça	Waldir do Nascimento	20 episodes
2017–18	Malhação: Viva a Diferença	Luís Becker	213 episodes
2018	Espelho da Vida	Flávio	28 episodes
2019	Hebe	Fego	5 episodes
2021	Segunda Chamada	Hélio	6 episodes
2021	Verdades Secretas II	Sandoval	4 episodes
2022	Todas as Flores	Samsa Mondego	14 episodes
2023	Terra e Paixão	Raul Andrade Amorim (Andrade)	
2024–present	Mania de Você	Nahum	
