= Nathalia Dill =

Brazilian actress (born 1986)

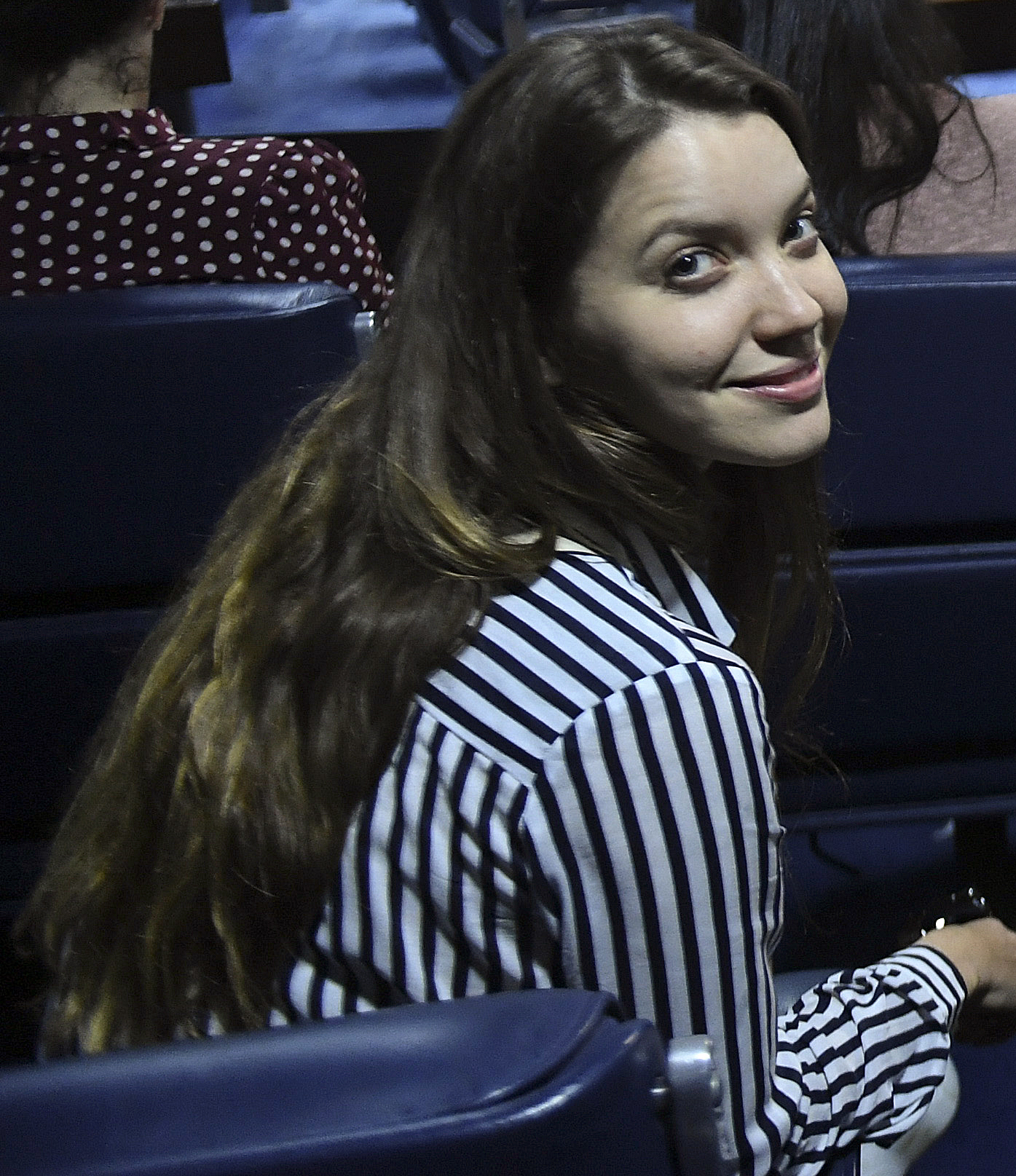
- Dill in 2018
- Born: Nathalia Goyannes Dill Orrico; 24 March 1986 (age 40); Rio de Janeiro, Brazil
- Occupation: Actress
- Years active: 2005–present
- Spouse(s): Caio Sóh (m. 2013; div. 2014) Pedro Curvello (m. 2019)

Nathalia Goyannes Dill Orrico (Brazilian Portuguese: [naˈtaliɐ ˈdʒiw]; born 24 March 1986) is a Brazilian actress. She has played the lead role in three telenovelas, the lead antagonist role in another two and the lead role in the 2012 film Artificial Paradises.

== Career ==
Dill was born in Rio de Janeiro. Dill played the antagonist Débora Rios in the telenovela Malhação from 2007 to 2009. She then played the lead role of Maria Rita (nicknamed Santinha) in the Rede Globo telenovela Paraíso, by Benedito Ruy Barbosa. Dill was cast in the lead role of Viviane in the telenovela Escrito nas Estrelas. Her character, Doralice, was part of the main love triangle in the 2011 Rede Globo's telenovela Cordel Encantado. Dill played one of the lead roles, Érica, in the 2011 film Paraísos Artificiais. She played Débora in the 2012 telenovela Avenida Brasil, by João Emanuel Carneiro, where her character falls in love with Jorge, played by Cauã Reymond. Dill played the lead antagonist, Sílvia, in the 2013 Rede Globo telenovela Joia Rara, her second lead antagonist role. She starred as the journalist Laura in the 2014 telenovela Alto Astral.

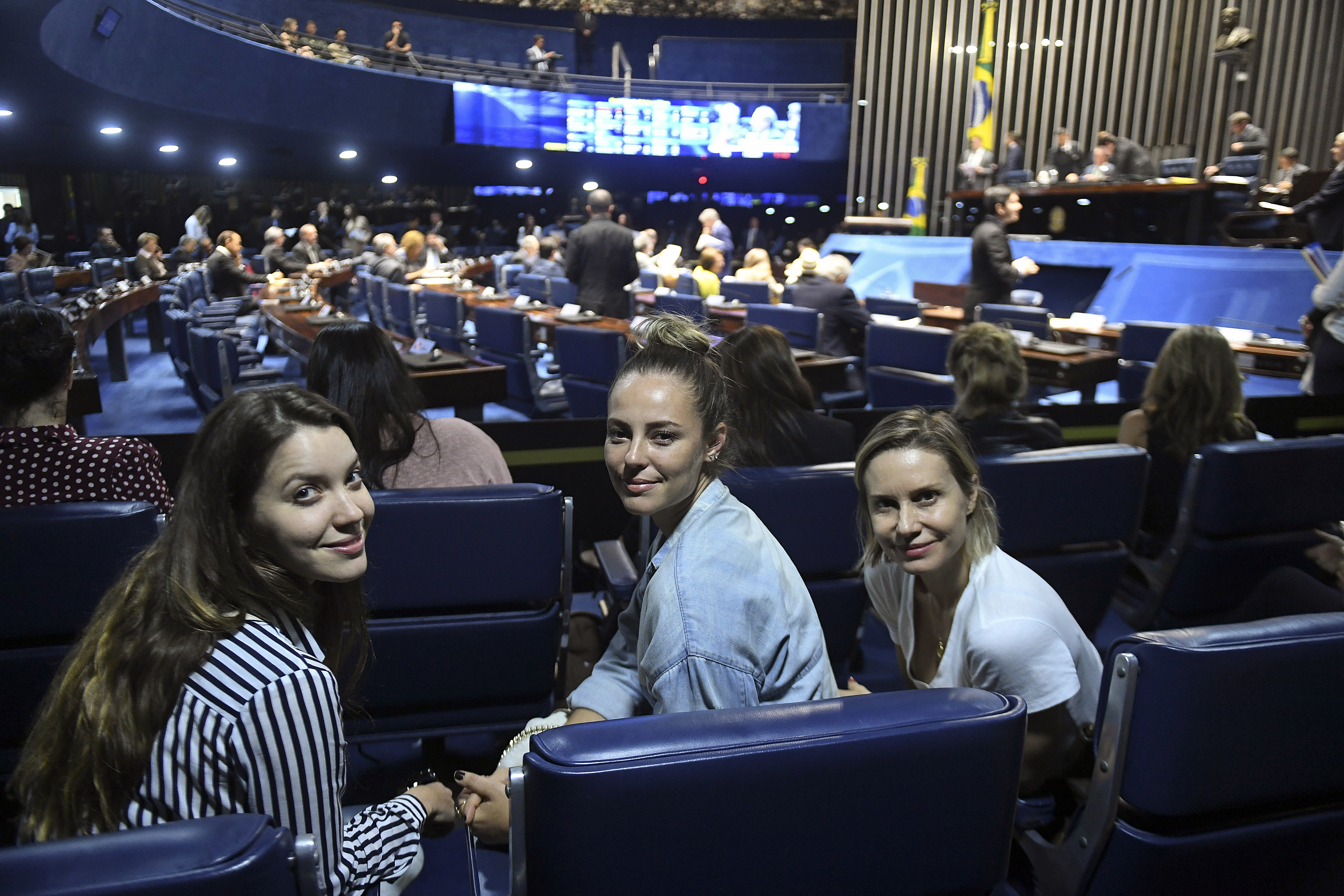
With Paolla Oliveira and Paula Burlamaqui in 2018

== Filmography ==
=== Television ===
Year	Title	Role	Notes
2006	Mandrake	Valentina	Episode: "Rosas Negras"
2007–2009	Malhação	Débora Rios	
2009	Paraíso	Maria Rita Godói (Santinha)	
2009	Dó-Ré-Mi-Fábrica	Viola	Co-lead role
2010	Escrito nas Estrelas	Viviane/Vitória	
2011	Aline	Death	Guest star
2011	Cordel Encantado	Doralice (Fubá)	Regular cast
2012	Avenida Brasil	Débora Queiroz	
2013–2014	Joia Rara	Sílvia	Lead
2014–2015	Alto Astral	Laura Martins	
2016	Êta Mundo Bom!	Anastácia (young)	Guest star
2016	Liberdade, Liberdade	Branca	
2016–2017	Rock Story	Júlia Monteiro	
2016–2017	Rock Story	Lorena Monteiro	
2018	Orgulho e Paixão	Elisabeta Benedito	
2019	A Dona do Pedaço	Fabiana Sobral Ramirez	
2024	Família é Tudo	Vênus Mancini	
2025	Guerreiros do Sol	Valiana	
2026	Quem Ama Cuida	Francesca	

=== Cinema ===
Year	Title	Role	Notes
2007	Elite Squad	Student	
2008	December	Marília	
2008	Apenas o Fim	Taiara	Lead antagonist
2009	Alguns Nomes do Impossível	Érika	Short film
2011	Artificial Paradises	Érika	Lead role
2015	Por Trás do Céu	Aparecida	
2015	Sobre a Verdade	Carolina	
2017	Talvez uma História de Amor	Fernanda	
2020	Um Casal Inseparável	Manuela	
2022	Incompatível	Patrícia Bacchi	
2025	Na Linha de Fogo	Louise	
2026	O Personagem	Diana	

=== Theater ===
Year	Title	Director
2005	A Glória de Nelson	Daniel Herz
2005	Jogos na Hora da Sesta	Michel Bercovitch
2006	As Aventuras de Tom Sawyer	Michel Bercovitch
2007	O Beijo no Asfalto	Michel Bercovitch (assistant director)
2008	Boca de Cowboy	Michel Bercovitch
2011	A Agonia do Rei	
2017	Fulaninho e Dona Coisa	
2022	Três Mulheres Altas	

== Awards and nominations ==
Year	Title	Award	Notes
2009	Best Female Newcomer	Prêmio TV Contigo	Won
2015	Best Actress	Prêmio Contigo! de TV	Nominated
