= Apenas o Fim =

2008 film directed by Matheus Souza

- Directed by: Matheus Souza
- Written by: Matheus Souza
- Starring: Gregório Duvivier; Érika Mader; Nathalia Dill; Marcelo Adnet; Álamo Facó
- Cinematography: Julio Secchin
- Edited by: Julio Secchin
- Music by: Pedro Carneiro
- Release dates: 5 October 2008 (Festival do Rio); 11 June 2009 (Brazil)
- Running time: 80 minutes
- Country: Brazil
- Language: Portuguese
- Budget: R$ 8,000

Apenas o Fim is a 2008 Brazilian comedy-romance film directed by Matheus Souza, his directorial debut, and starring Gregório Duvivier, Érika Mader, Nathalia Dill and Marcelo Adnet.

The film is the result of a project by students of the film school of Pontifical Catholic University of Rio de Janeiro (PUC-Rio), and it was all filmed at the university, with the support of the Department of Social Communication.

== Plot ==
A girl decides to run away from her ordinary life leaving her parents, friends and her boyfriend Antonio. But before leaving, she resolves to spend the last hour with him, having a long conversation while walking in college. They speak about their relationship remembering the past, imagining the future and discussing a number of fears and issues involving their generation.

== Cast ==
- Gregório Duvivier
- Érika Mader
- Nathalia Dill
- Marcelo Adnet
- Álamo Facó

== Awards and nominations ==
- Festival do Rio - 2008
  - Honorable Mention - Jury
  - Best Fiction Feature Film - The public choice award
- 32nd São Paulo International Film Festival - 2008
  - Best Brazilian Fiction Feature Film - The public choice award
