= Afonso Poyart =

Brazilian film director, producer and writer

- Born: 1979 (age 46–47); Santos, São Paulo, Brazil
- Occupations: Film director, producer and screenwriter
- Years active: 2005–present

Afonso Poyart (born 1979) is a Brazilian film director, producer and writer. He made his feature film directorial debut with the 2012 action 2 Coelhos ("2 Rabbits") and directed the 2015 film Solace, starring Anthony Hopkins.

== Filmography ==
=== Film ===
| Year | Title | Language |
|---|---|---|
| 2005 | Eu te Darei o Céu (short film) | Portuguese |
| 2012 | 2 Coelhos | Portuguese |
| 2015 | Solace | English |
| 2016 | Mais Forte que o Mundo | Portuguese |

=== Television ===
| Year | Title | Language |
|---|---|---|
| 2018 | Ilha de Ferro | Portuguese |
