= Zé Peixe =

Brazilian maritime pilot

José Martins Ribeiro Nunes (5 January 1927 – 26 April 2012), also known as Zé Peixe or Joe Fish, was a maritime pilot. Unusually, rather than meeting and departing from the ships out at sea using a pilot boat, he would swim to and from the ships, jumping heights of more than 40 meters (130 ft) and swimming about 10 kilometers (6.2 mi) a day.

José was a native from Aracaju, Brazil, where he practiced his profession from 1947.
