= Ponto Org =

2012 film directed by Patrícia Moran

- Directed by: Patrícia Moran
- Starring: Paulo César Peréio; Flávio Renegado; Erika Altimeyer; Teuda Bara; Rafael Chagas
- Production companies: Usina Digital; Dezenove Filmes
- Distributed by: Usina Digital
- Release date: September 21, 2012 (Brazil)
- Running time: 80 minutes
- Country: Brazil
- Language: Portuguese

Ponto Org (English: dot org) is a 2012 Brazilian independent drama film directed by Patrícia Moran.

Ponto Org follows Diamantino and Bárbara, who try to help three street boys of São Paulo. The film was shot in 2010 and despite being a fictional drama depicts the harsh reality of the homeless in a city like São Paulo.
