= Esperantina, Piauí =

Esperantina
- Municipality
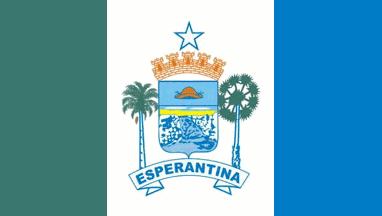
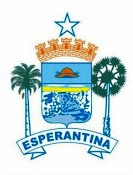
- Flag Coat of arms
- Nickname: Boa Esperança (Good Hope)
- Motto: Terra que amamos

- Location in Brazil
- Coordinates: 03°54′07″S 42°14′02″W
- Country: Brazil
- Region: Nordeste
- State: Piauí
- Mesoregion: Norte Piauiense
- Founded: July 25, 1920

Government
  - Mayor: Vilma Carvalho Amorim (PT)

Area
  - Total: 911.213 km^{2} (351.821 sq mi)
- Elevation: 59 m (194 ft)

Population (2020)
  - Total: 39,848
  - Density: 41.44/km^{2} (107.3/sq mi)
- Time zone: UTC−3 (BRT)
- Demonym: esperantinense

Esperantina is a municipality in the state of Piauí in the Northeast region of Brazil.

The town is the home of International Female Orgasm Day which was established in 2007 by José Arimatéia Dantas Lacerda. The holiday is celebrated each August 8.

== Climate ==
Climate data for Esperantina (1981–2010)
Month	Jan	Feb	Mar	Apr	May	Jun	Jul	Aug	Sep	Oct	Nov	Dec	Year
Mean daily maximum °C (°F)	33.3 (91.9)	32.1 (89.8)	31.7 (89.1)	31.4 (88.5)	31.7 (89.1)	32.1 (89.8)	33.2 (91.8)	35.0 (95.0)	36.7 (98.1)	37.3 (99.1)	37.0 (98.6)	35.8 (96.4)	33.9 (93.0)
Daily mean °C (°F)	27.1 (80.8)	26.4 (79.5)	26.3 (79.3)	26.3 (79.3)	26.4 (79.5)	26.4 (79.5)	26.6 (79.9)	27.4 (81.3)	28.2 (82.8)	28.6 (83.5)	28.8 (83.8)	28.3 (82.9)	27.2 (81.0)
Mean daily minimum °C (°F)	22.0 (71.6)	21.9 (71.4)	22.0 (71.6)	22.0 (71.6)	22.1 (71.8)	21.6 (70.9)	21.4 (70.5)	21.3 (70.3)	21.6 (70.9)	22.1 (71.8)	22.2 (72.0)	22.3 (72.1)	21.9 (71.4)
Average precipitation mm (inches)	169.2 (6.66)	222.7 (8.77)	310.6 (12.23)	312.0 (12.28)	192.4 (7.57)	68.6 (2.70)	27.2 (1.07)	13.2 (0.52)	10.0 (0.39)	15.9 (0.63)	31.7 (1.25)	78.8 (3.10)	1,452.3 (57.18)
Average precipitation days (≥ 1.0 mm)	12	14	19	19	13	6	4	1	2	2	3	6	101
Average relative humidity (%)	77.6	81.9	83.4	83.8	83.6	81.0	79.0	73.1	69.5	67.9	67.3	69.7	76.5
Mean monthly sunshine hours	207.7	192.8	206.0	199.0	233.6	252.0	285.3	303.8	298.8	305.7	271.9	246.1	3,002.7
Source: Instituto Nacional de Meteorologia

== See also ==
- List of municipalities in Piauí
