= Fernando Coimbra =

Brazilian film director

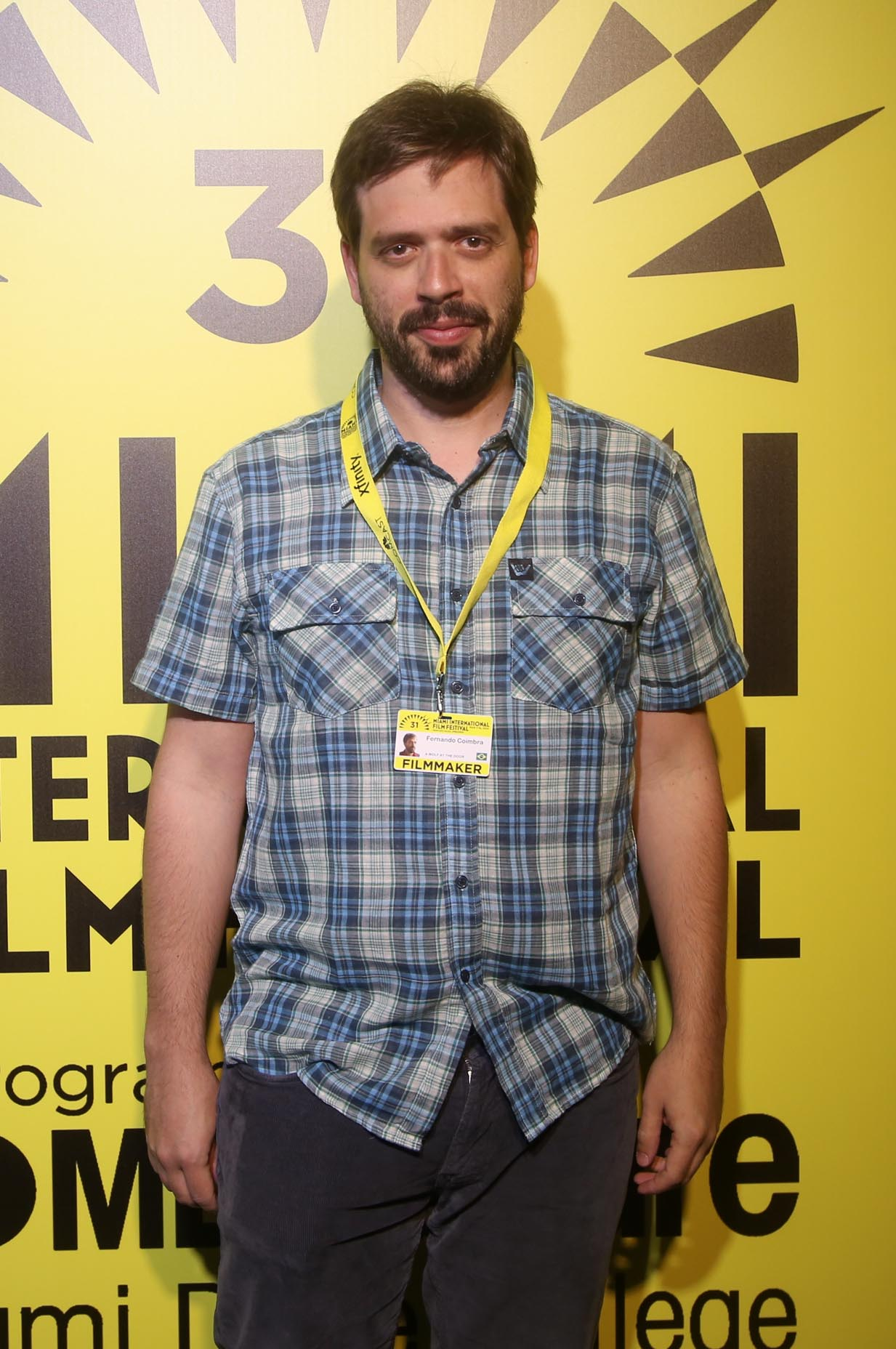
- Coimbra at the 2014 Miami International Film Festival
- Born: 1976 (age 49–50)
- Occupations: Film director, screenwriter

Fernando Coimbra (born 1976) is a Brazilian filmmaker best known for directing A Wolf at the Door (2013) and Sand Castle (2017).

== Career ==
Coimbra's feature directorial debut, A Wolf at the Door, premiered at the 2013 Toronto International Film Festival and also screened at that year's San Sebastián International Film Festival, where it was recognized as the best film in the Latinos Horizontes section. A Wolf at the Door garnered Coimbra a nomination for Outstanding Directing – First-Time Feature Film at the 2015 Directors Guild of America Awards. The following year, the film was nominated for Best Ibero-American Film at the 58th Ariel Awards.

Coimbra co-directed the 2015 documentary Aqui Deste Lugar with Sergio Machado. From 2015 to 2017, he directed episodes of the Netflix series Narcos. He co-directed the 2017 Brazilian HBO series O Honem da Sua Vida with Daniel Rezende.

Sand Castle, Coimbra's Iraq War drama starring Nicholas Hoult and Henry Cavill, was released on Netflix in 2017. His mafia film Carnival is Over was slated to premiere in the Special Presentations section of the 2024 Toronto International Film Festival.

== Filmography ==
=== Film ===
Year	English title	Original title	Notes	Ref.
2013	A Wolf at the Door	O Lobo Atrás da Porta		
2015	Here, from This Place	Aqui Deste Lugar	Co-directed with Sergio Machado	
2017	Sand Castle			
2024	Carnival Is Over	Os Enforcados		

=== Television ===
Year	Title	Notes	Ref.
2015–2017	Narcos	4 episodes	
2017	O Honem da Sua Vida	13 episodes, co-directed with Daniel Rezende	
2017	Outcast	1 episode	
2018	Terrores Urbanos	2 episodes	
2019	What/If	1 episode	
2023	Perry Mason	2 episodes	

== Awards and nominations ==
Year	Award	Category	Nominated work	Result	Ref.
2013	San Sebastián International Film Festival	Horizon Award	A Wolf at the Door	Won	
2013	Rio de Janeiro International Film Festival	Premiere Brazil Feature Competition	A Wolf at the Door	Won (Note: Shared with Caru Alves de Souza for Underage.)	
2014	Miami Film Festival	Grand Jury Prize	A Wolf at the Door	Won	
2014	Miami Film Festival	Best Director	A Wolf at the Door	Won	
2015	Directors Guild of America	Outstanding Directing – First-Time Feature Film	A Wolf at the Door	Nominated	
2016	Ariel Award	Best Ibero-American Film	A Wolf at the Door	Nominated	
