= Solace (2015 film) =

Film by Afonso Poyart

- Theatrical release poster
- Directed by: Afonso Poyart
- Written by: Sean Bailey; Ted Griffin
- Produced by: Thomas Augsberger; Matthias Emcke; Beau Flynn; Tripp Vinson; Claudia Bluemhuber
- Starring: Anthony Hopkins; Jeffrey Dean Morgan; Abbie Cornish; Colin Farrell
- Cinematography: Brendan Galvin
- Edited by: Lucas Gonzaga
- Music by: BT
- Production companies: Silver Reel; Eden Rock Media; FilmNation Entertainment; Flynn Picture Company; Venture Forth
- Distributed by: Lionsgate Premiere
- Release dates: September 9, 2015 (TIFF); December 16, 2016 (United States)
- Running time: 101 minutes
- Country: United States
- Language: English
- Box office: $22.4 million

Solace is a 2015 American mystery thriller film directed by Afonso Poyart and starring Anthony Hopkins, Colin Farrell, Jeffrey Dean Morgan and Abbie Cornish. Its storyline follows a psychic doctor, John Clancy (Anthony Hopkins), who works with FBI special agent Joe Merriwether (Jeffrey Dean Morgan) in search of serial killer Charles Ambrose (Colin Farrell).

The film's script was originally planned and developed as a sequel to the 1995 thriller film Se7en, but the idea was eventually scrapped. Solace was completed as a standalone film.

Solace was released on December 16, 2016, by Lionsgate Premiere. It received generally negative reviews from critics.

== Plot ==
FBI Agent Joe Merriwether and criminal psychologist Dr Katherine Cowles are investigating a series of murders committed with elaborate methods. With little progress, Merriwether decides he needs to consult with a former colleague, and psychic, Dr John Clancy. Clancy has lived in isolation since the death of his daughter two years before. He is capable of seeing the future, or possibilities of futures, from a mere touch of a person.

Merriwether seems unable to convince Clancy to take part in the case, but when Cowles enters and touches him on the shoulder after giving him the case files, he envisions a violent future event with blood spilling down Katherine's forehead, among other insights into her life. Clancy reluctantly agrees. Cowles' initial skepticism of his gift soon gives way.

The victims are all found to have been suffering from terminal illnesses. Clancy realizes the killer has abilities exceeding his own. Merriwether is shot by the suspect. He says that he was diagnosed with terminal cancer before dying in the hospital.

After the funeral, Clancy is confronted by the killer, who explains he is sparing his victims from a slow death, killing them out of mercy, and that he arranged Merriwether's death. He arrogantly declares he has seen all the possible outcomes of their confrontation, but Clancy surprises him. Nonetheless, the killer escapes after distracting police by saying Clancy has a gun.

Cowles discovers the killer is Charles Ambrose. Clancy is forced to test his abilities to their limits and is able to intercept Ambrose as he poisons his latest victim. Clancy tells him he has no right to take time away from even the terminally ill, such as his friend Merriwether.

Cowles and Clancy finally confront Ambrose in a subway car. Ambrose tells Clancy that he is dying and asks Clancy to shoot him. He wants him to take over the role of mercy killing and warns him that Cowles will be killed if he does not shoot him. She runs up behind Clancy and both Ambrose and Clancy fire their weapons. Ambrose dies and Clancy is injured. Clancy and Cowles become close, as he sees her as the daughter he lost.

In the hospital, Clancy gives Cowles a letter for his wife, with whom Clancy reconciles. He recalls euthanizing his own daughter as she was dying from leukemia.

== Cast ==
- Anthony Hopkins as Dr. John Clancy
- Colin Farrell as Charles Ambrose
- Jeffrey Dean Morgan as FBI Agent Joseph Joe Merriwether
- Abbie Cornish as FBI Agent Katherine Cowles
- Jordan Woods-Robinson as Jeffrey Oldfield
- Marley Shelton as Laura Merriwether
- Xander Berkeley as Mr. Ellis
- Kenny Johnson as David Raymond
- Janine Turner as Elizabeth Clancy
- Sharon Lawrence as Mrs. Ellis
- Jose Pablo Cantillo as Sawyer
- Matt Gerald as Sloman
- Autumn Dial as Emma Clancy
- Joshua Close as Linus Harp
- Luisa Moraes as Victoria Raymond

== Production ==
"The film has an influence of Se7en and Silence of the Lambs, but tried to flee the genre. I do not think Solace is a serial killer movie, it is only its outer layer. In the background the film is much more than that, talking about life and death, and raises some interesting moral dilemmas.

— Afonso Poyart.

In February 1998, it was reported that Sean Bailey and Ted Griffin's script Solace, revolving around a doctor who becomes involved with a bizarre series of deaths in Manhattan, had been acquired by Fox 2000 Pictures. In April 2001, New Line Cinema had acquired the script which was now centered on a psychic detective tracking a killer. In April 2003, Paul Verhoeven was reportedly in negotiations with New Line to direct after Nick Cassavetes and Miguel Sapochnik had been previously attached. In March 2005, it was reported that New Line had set Shekhar Kapur to direct and Bruce Willis to star as a doctor with psychic abilities assisting the police in hunting a serial killer with similar abilities. In September 2008, New Line had hired Mark Pellington to direct and the screenplay had been given revisions by James Vanderbilt. In September 2011, Anthony Hopkins was cast as the lead with final changes made to the screenplay by Peter Morgan. In May 2012, it was announced that Brazilian director Afonso Poyart was attached to direct. The film's lengthy development cycle prior to having a set cast and director was noted by industry trades at the time who noted a decrease in studio produced thrillers centered on serial killers as the genre relocated more towards primetime television series like CSI: Crime Scene Investigation with Criminal Minds.

At one point the script was picked up by New Line Cinema and intended to be rewritten as a sequel to Se7en, tentatively titled Ei8ht, with Morgan Freeman returning as Det. William Somerset, who would have developed psychic powers. The idea was eventually dropped when Se7en director David Fincher responded negatively to the idea, and the film was subsequently rewritten as a standalone project.

Principal photography began in May 2013 in Atlanta, Georgia.

== Release ==
The film made its premiere in Turkey on April 24, 2015, before receiving a screening at the 2015 Toronto International Film Festival on September 9, 2015.

Following the film's troubled production and after it allegedly lay in a cupboard for more than one year, the trailers issued in summer 2015 at first couldn't motivate any American distributor into purchasing the rights to the film. It was originally scheduled to be released on September 2, 2016, by Relativity Media; that media company was in Chapter 11 insolvency since 2015, but in January 2016 it reached an agreement to acquire Kevin Spacey's production label Trigger Street, with Spacey reportedly due to take over management of the film. In October 2016, Lionsgate Premiere acquired U.S rights to the film, and set it for a December 16, 2016, release.

== Reception ==
On review aggregator Rotten Tomatoes, the film has a rating of 25% based on 51 reviews and an average score of 4.18/10. The site's consensus reads, "Solace boasts a talented cast and a somewhat intriguing premise, but they're outweighed by a plodding story that teeters between tired clichés and ludicrous twists." On Metacritic, the film has a weighted average score of 36% based on reviews from 12 critics, indicating "generally unfavorable reviews".

Peter Debruge of Variety called it a "corny but clever serial killer thriller" whose cast makes the film work. Bernard Besserglik of The Hollywood Reporter wrote that the film is not as good as its inspiration, but the chemistry between Hopkins and Farrell makes it worth showing theatrically despite the film's reputation for having a troubled production.

Peter Bradshaw of The Guardian wrote "This could be one of those rare and terrifying serial killer cases where the psychotic culprit apparently intends to bore and embarrass everyone to death with bad acting." Tim Robey of The Telegraph calls the film a misfire and blames director Afonso Poyart and his unusual editing and zooming.
