= Dira Paes =

Brazilian actress

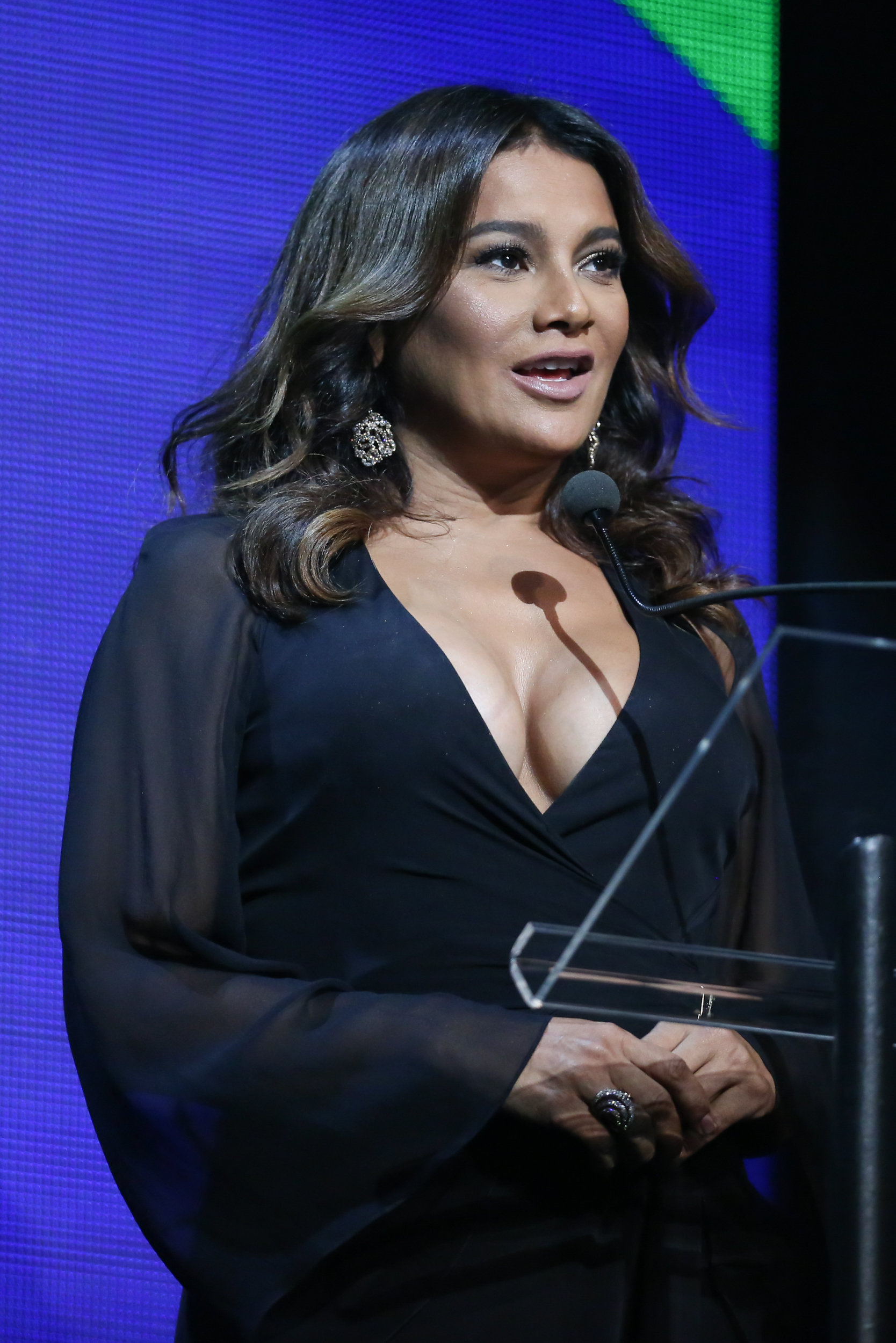
- Paes in 2015
- Born: Ecleidira Maria Fonseca Paes; 30 June 1969 (age 57); Abaetetuba, Pará, Brazil
- Education: Federal University of the State of Rio de Janeiro
- Occupations: Actress, television presenter
- Years active: 1985–present
- Height: 1.63 m (5 ft 4 in)
- Spouse: Pablo Baião (m. 2006)
- Children: 2
- Parent(s): Flor Paes (mother); Edir Paes (father)

Ecleidira Maria Fonseca Paes (born 30 June 1969), known professionally as Dira Paes, is a Brazilian actress and television presenter. Among the numerous awards and nominations she has received, Paes won the Best Actress and Best Supporting Actress at the Festival de Brasília for Corisco & Dadá and Anahy de las Misiones, respectively, as well as the Best Actress at the 2013 Grande Prêmio do Cinema Brasileiro for À Beira do Caminho.

== Biography ==
Born in Abaetetuba, in the interior of Pará, and raised in Belém, Paes had a very simple childhood with seven siblings. She always wanted to be an actress, despite financial difficulties, she did not give up on her dream. She is of Native Brazilian, Portuguese, and African descent, and identifies herself as Amazonian cabocla.

== Selected filmography ==
=== TV ===
- Carne de Sol (1986)
- Ele, O boto (1987)
- Araponga (1990)
- Irmãos Coragem (1995)
- Dona Flor e Seus Dois Maridos (1998)
- Chiquinha Gonzaga (1999)
- Força de um Desejo (1999)
- A Diarista (2004–2007)
- Um Só Coração (2004)
- Casos e Acasos (2008)
- Caminho das Índias (2009)
- Zorra Total (2009)
- Casseta e Planeta, Urgente (2009)
- Ti Ti Ti (2010)
- Fina Estampa (2011)
- As Brasileiras (2012)
- Salve Jorge (2012)
- O Rebu (2014)
- Amores Roubados (2014)
- Criança Esperança (2015–2017)
- Babilônia (2015)
- Velho Chico (2016)
- Segredos de Justiça (2017)
- Pantanal (2022)
- Três Graças (2025)
- Pablo & Luisão (2025)
- Lá na Minha Terra (2026)

=== Films ===
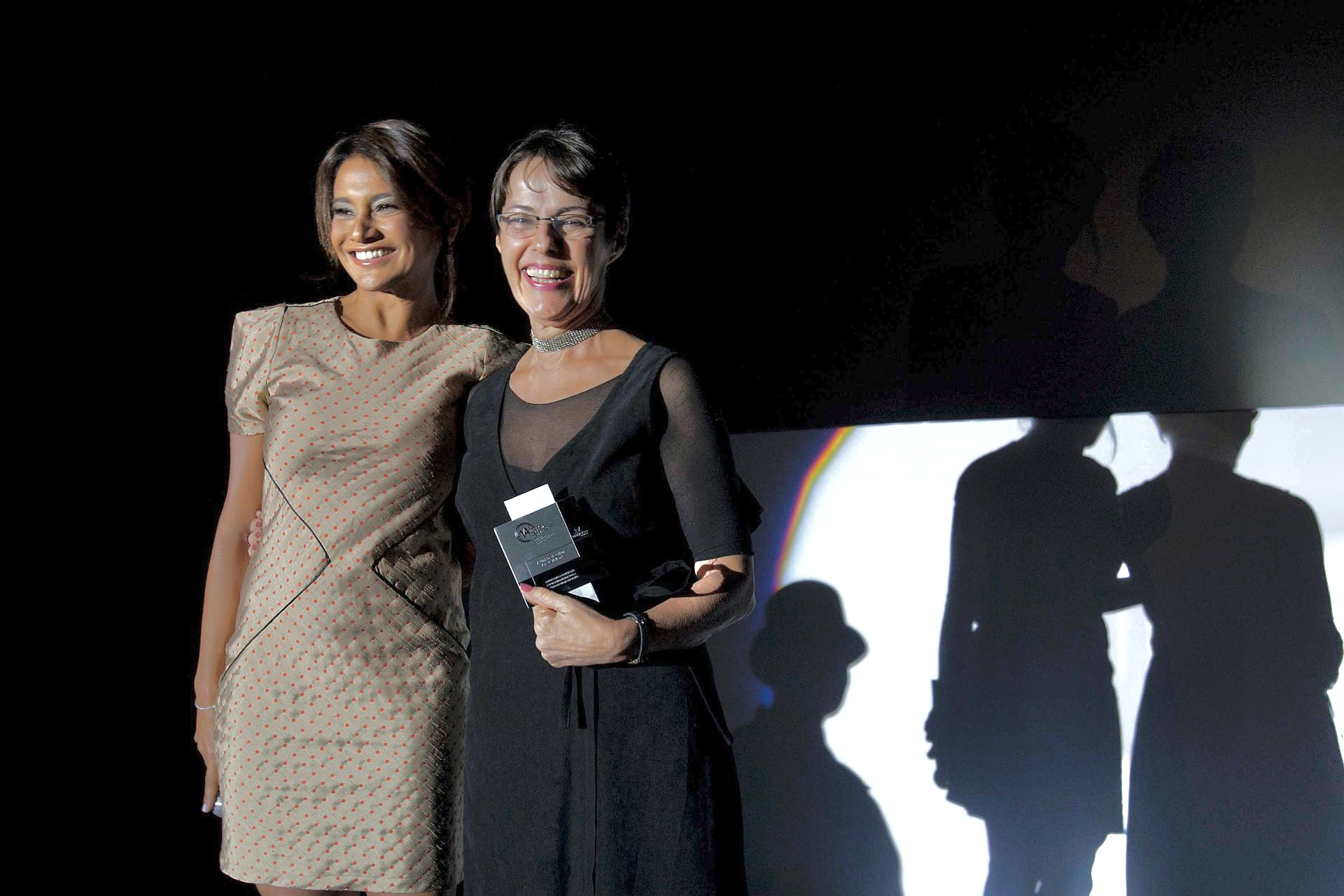
Dira Paes and Ana de Hollanda in the 14th edition of the Tiradentes Film Festival.

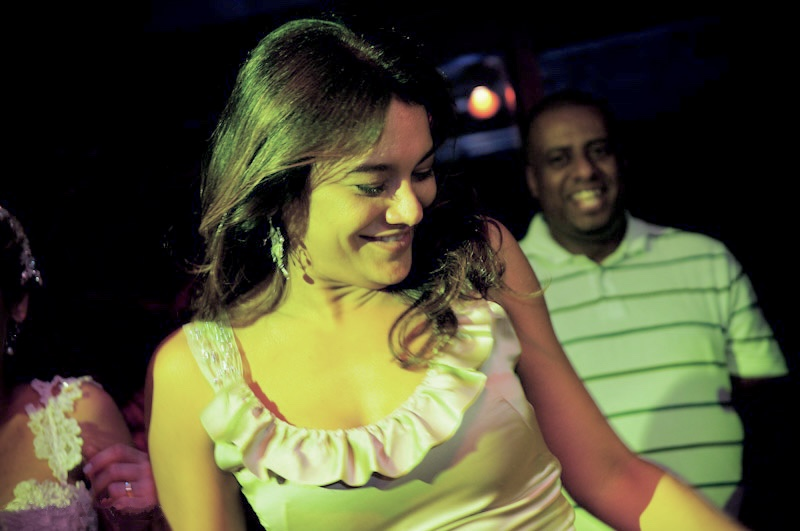
Dira Paes in 2009.

Year	Films	Paper
1985	The Emerald Forest	Kachiri
1987	Ele, o Boto	Corina
1987	Au Bout du Rouleau	—
1990	Corpo em Delito	—
1994	Obra do Destino	—
1996	Corisco & Dadá	Dadá
1997	Anahy de las Misiones	Luna
1999	Lendas Amazônicas	—
1999	Castro Alves – Retrato Falado do Poeta	—
2000	Cronicamente Inviável	Amanda
2000	Vida e Obra de Ramiro Miguez	—
2001	O Casamento de Louise	Luiza
2002	Mango Yellow	Kika
2002	Lua Cambará – Nas Escadarias do Palácio	Lua Cambará
2003	Noite de São João	Joana
2004	Meu Tio Matou um Cara	Cleia
2005	Celeste & Estrela	Celeste Espírito Santo
2005	Incuráveis	—
2005	2 Filhos de Francisco – A História de Zezé Di Camargo & Luciano	Helena Siqueira de Camargo
2006	Bog of Beasts	Bela
2006	Mulheres do Brasil	Júlia
2007	Ó Paí, Ó	Psilene
2007	A Grande Família – O Filme	Marina
2008	The Dead Girl's Feast	Diana
2010	Ribeirinhos do Asfalto	Rosa
2010	Matinta	Walkíria
2010	Amazônia Caruana	Cotinha
2011	Estamos Juntos	Leonora
2011	Southwest	Conceição
2012	E Aí... Comeu?	Leila
2012	À Beira do Caminho	Rosa
2013	Os Amigos	Majú
2015	Órfãos do Eldorado	Florita
2015	Mulheres no Poder	Maria Pilar
2016	O País do Cinema	–
2017	Redemoinho	Toninha
2017	Lino: An Adventure of Seven Lives	Janine
2019	Divine Love	Joana
2024	Manas	Aretha
