= À beira do caminho =

2012 Brazilian drama film

- Directed by: Breno Silveira
- Written by: Patrícia Andrade
- Produced by: Lula Buarque de Hollanda
- Starring: João Miguel; Ângelo Antônio; Dira Paes; Vinícius Nascimento; Ludmila Rosa
- Cinematography: Lula Carvalho
- Edited by: Vicente Kubrusly
- Music by: Berna Ceppas
- Production company: Conspiração Filmes
- Distributed by: 20th Century Fox
- Release date: 10 August 2012
- Running time: 102 minutes
- Country: Brazil
- Language: Portuguese
- Box office: $713,129

À beira do caminho is a 2012 Brazilian drama film directed by Breno Silveira, starring João Miguel, Ângelo Antônio, Dira Paes, Vinícius Nascimento, and Ludmila Rosa. The title of the film is a reference to the 1969 popular song "Sentado à beira do caminho" by Erasmo Carlos.

== Plot ==
João, a truck driver, leaves his hometown and travels across the country. On one of his trips, he discovers a boy, Duda, hidden in his truck; the child, who has no mother, is in search of his father. João reluctantly agrees to take him to the nearest city, and ends up forming a friendship with him.

== Cast and characters ==
- João Miguel as João
- Vinícius Nascimento as Duda
- Ângelo Antônio as Afonso
- Dira Paes as Rosa
- Ludmila Rosa as Helena

== Reviews ==
The film received mixed reviews. Several critics pointed out similarities with Silveira's 2005 feature Two Sons of Francisco.
