= Downtown Filmes =

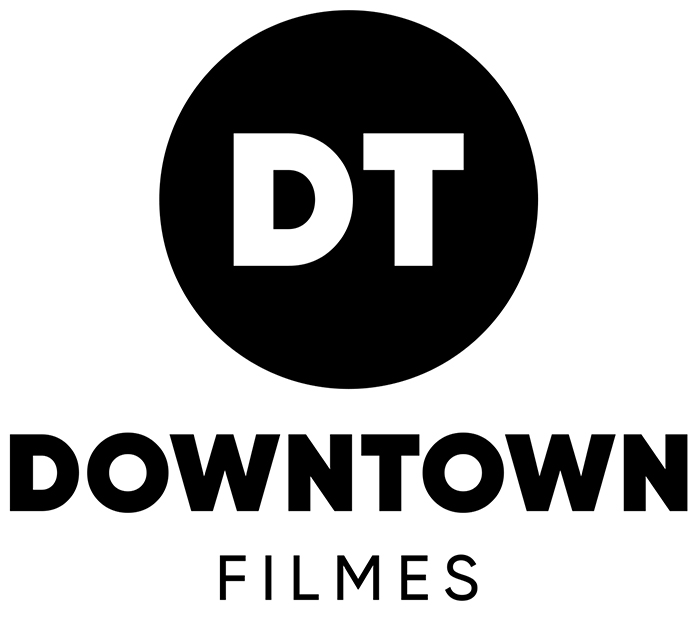
- Type: Private
- Founded: 2006
- Headquarters: Rio de Janeiro, Brazil
- Key people: Bruno Wainer

Downtown Filmes is a film distributor dedicated exclusively to the release of Brazilian films.

The company is led by Bruno Wainer, which was responsible for the distribution of some of the greatest hits of Brazilian cinema, among them Olga, Os Normais, Central do Brasil and Cidade de Deus.

== History ==
In 2017, Elis, a film distributed by Paris Filmes and Downtown Filmes had the most nominations for the Brazilian Cinema Grand Prix. In September of the same year, Downtown Filmes scheduled a movie screening in solidarity with João Pedro. The nine-year-old boy, who has cerebral palsy, was forgotten on a school outing, and the case gained repercussion after his mother reported it on a social network.

In August 2019, it revamped its logo and adopted a new name, DT Films. In April 2020, it announced the release of 180 films together with Paris Filmes to theaters for the industry's post-COVID-19 pandemic revival. In January, it was one of the supporters of the "Rocinha Project," which screened audiovisual productions in the Rocinha slum.

== Films ==
- Anjos Do Sol (2005)
- Gatão de Meia-Idade (2005)
- Crime Delicado (2005)
- Meninas (2006)
- Antônia – O Filme (2006)
- Wood & Stock: Sexo, Orégano e Rock'n'Roll (2006)
- Querô (2006)
- Os Desafinados (2006)
- Batismo de Sangue (2006)
- Histórias do Rio Negro (2006)
- Irma Vap - O Retorno (2006)
- Panair Do Brasil (2007)
- Cão Sem Dono (2007)
- Estômago (2007)
- Nome Próprio (2007)
- Iluminados (2007)
- Meu Nome Não É Johnny (2007)
- Garoto Cósmico (2007)
- Salve Geral (2009)
- Do Começo ao Fim (2009)
- Só 10% É Mentira (2009)
- Desenrola (2009)
- Divã (2009)
- Waste Land (2009)
- Tempos de Paz (2009)
- Sequestro (2009)
- Lula, The Son of Brasil (2009)
- Histórias De Amor Duram Apenas 90 Minutos (2009)
- Rock Brasília – Era de Ouro (2010)
- Malu De Bicicleta (2010)
- De Pernas Pro Ar (2010)
- Chico Xavier (2010)
- As Aventuras de Agamenon – O Repórter (2010)
- Uma Professora Muito Maluquinha (2011)
- Tancredo – A Travessia (2011)
- Dirty Hearts (2011)
- Heleno (2011)
- Cilada.com (2011)
- Tainá 3: The Origin (2011)
- Xingu (2012)
- Até que a Sorte nos Separe (2012)
- Marighella (2012)
- Totalmente Inocentes (2012)
- Gonzaga – De Pai pra Filho (2012)
- E aí, comeu? (2012)
- De Pernas pro Ar 2 (2012)
- A Busca (2013)
- O Menino no Espelho (2014)
- Carrossel - O Filme (2015)
- A esperança é a última que morre (2015)
- The Ten Commandments: The Movie - (2016)
- Um Suburbano Sortudo (2016)
- Porta dos Fundos: Contrato Vitalício (2016)
- A frente fria que a chuva traz (2016)
- Carrossel 2: O Sumiço de Maria Joaquina (2016)
- Elis - (2016)
- O Shaolin do Sertão - (2016)
- Tô Ryca - (2016)
- O Último Virgem - (2016)
- A frente fria que a chuva traz - (2016)
- De Pernas pro Ar 3 (2017)
- D. P. A. 3 - Uma Aventura no Fim do Mundo (2020)
