= A Wolf at the Door (film) =

2013 film by Fernando Coimbra

- Theatrical release poster
- Portuguese: O Lobo Atrás da Porta
- Directed by: Fernando Coimbra
- Written by: Fernando Coimbra
- Produced by: Caio Gullane; Fabiano Gullane; Debora Ivanov; Gabriel Lacerda; Rodrigo Castellar; Pablo Torrecillas
- Starring: Leandra Leal; Milhem Cortaz; Fabiula Nascimento; Juliano Cazarré; Paulo Tiefenthaler; Tamara Taxman; Emiliano Queiroz; Thalita Carauta; Isabelle Ribas
- Cinematography: Lula Carvalho
- Edited by: Karen Akerman
- Music by: Ricardo Cutz
- Production companies: Gullane; TC Filmes; CaBra Filmes; Pela Madrugada
- Distributed by: Imagem Filmes
- Release dates: 11 September 2013 (TIFF); 29 May 2014 (Brazil)
- Running time: 100 minutes
- Country: Brazil
- Language: Portuguese
- Budget: R$1.5 million
- Box office: $446,436

A Wolf at the Door (Portuguese: O Lobo Atrás da Porta, lit. 'The Wolf Behind the Door') is a 2013 Brazilian thriller drama film written and directed by Fernando Coimbra, in his feature directorial debut. The film follows the story of Sylvia and Bernardo, the parents of a kidnapped girl, and Rosa, Bernardo's lover, who is suspected for the kidnapping. It is based on a real-life crime that occurred in the 1960s, where a woman named Neyde Maria Maia Lopes ("The Beast of Penha") kidnapped and killed four-year-old Tania Maria Coelho de Araujo ("Taninha").

The film had its world premiere at the 2013 Toronto International Film Festival. It won the Horizontes Latinos award at the 61st San Sebastián International Film Festival.

The film, translated by Andrey Efremov, was shown in Moscow, Russia, as part of the 36th Moscow International Film Festival in June 2014.

== Plot ==
A mother and housewife named Sylvia goes to pick up her daughter Clara at school, and finds her missing. She is told by the teacher that she received a phone call from someone who claimed to be her, saying that she was sick and that a neighbor would come pick her up instead.

At the police station, Sylvia, her husband Bernardo, and the teacher are questioned for possible clues about who could have taken the girl. Bernardo reveals that he strongly suspects it was the work of a woman named Rosa, with whom he'd been carrying on an affair for some time. Rosa is taken in for questioning. At first, she is reluctant to speak, and tells the police that she was blackmailed into taking the girl at the behest of a woman named Bete, whose husband was supposedly involved in an affair with Sylvia. This is exposed as a lie by the police after an investigation of the neighborhood reveals that no such woman exists, and after the police officer threatens her, Rosa confesses everything.

Rosa and Bernardo met at a train station after the latter saw her on the train and followed her. Their affair begins passionately, but Rosa becomes upset when she discovers that Bernardo lied to her about being married and having a family. She tells him that she does not mind being his lover for the time being, but begins to visit his wife and child, befriending her by pretending to be a mutual acquaintance of an old friend and presenting his daughter with gifts. Upon being told about this by his wife, Bernardo becomes enraged and fights with Rosa, abusing her and ordering her never to seek out his family again. Rosa ignores this request, and tries to sabotage Bernardo's and Sylvia's relationship by paying a woman at a bar to phone him, pretending to be the angry wife of Sylvia's lover. She also discovers that Bernardo has been rekindling his relationship with Sylvia anyway, and that it is likely that their affair is at its end.

During an argument about the future of their relationship, Rosa reveals that her period is late. Rosa complies with Bernardo's request to have a pregnancy test, which turns out positive. She tells Bernardo that he can resume his life without regard to what becomes of her, but that she is having the child no matter what. Some time later, Bernardo tricks Rosa into visiting a medical-practitioner acquaintance of his, who drugs Rosa and performs an abortion against her will.

Devastated and unstable, Rosa tries to arrange one last meeting with Bernardo, but is rebuffed. She picks up Clara at school, and eventually takes her to an abandoned lot, where she pulls out a pistol from her purse, kills the child, and burns her corpse with flammable liquid. The film ends with a voiceover from the police officer describing Rosa's statement about the matter: she feels no remorse, and understands the full weight of her actions. She has no desire for an attorney, does not care about what will happen to her, and does not wish for anyone's forgiveness.

== Cast ==
- Leandra Leal as Rosa
- Milhem Cortaz as Bernardo
- Fabiula Nascimento as Sylvia
- Isabelle Ribas as Clara
- Juliano Cazarré as chief of police
- Thalita Carauta as Bete
- Paulo Tiefenthaler as Wander
- Karine Teles as Arlete
- Tamara Taxman as Rosa's mother
- Emiliano Queiroz as Rosa's father
- Gustavo Novaes as Dr. Linhares
- Antônio Saboia as inspector
