= Breno Silveira =

Brazilian film director (1964–2022)

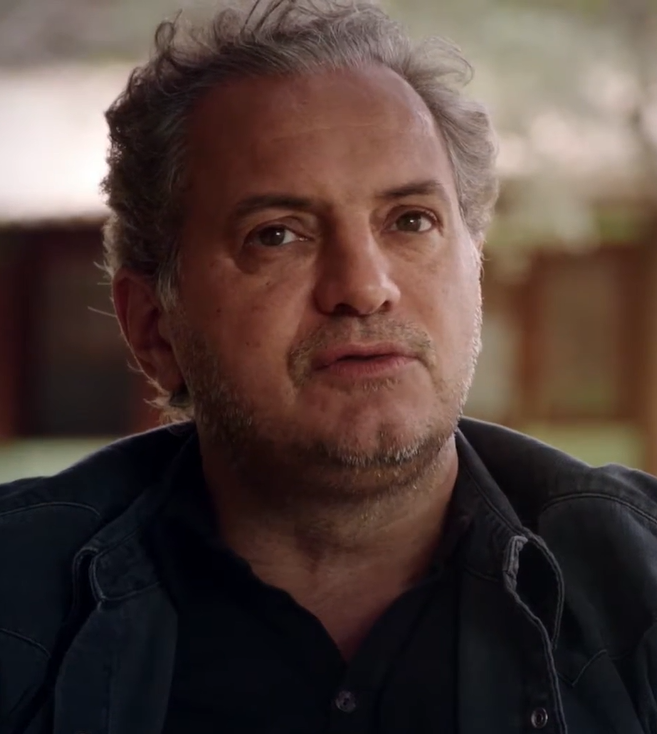
- Silveira in 2016
- Born: 5 February 1964; Brasília, Brazil
- Died: 14 May 2022 (aged 58); Vicência, Pernambuco, Brazil

Breno Silveira (5 February 1964 – 14 May 2022) was a Brazilian filmmaker noted for having directed Two Sons of Francisco, the highest-grossing film of 2005.

== Early life and education ==
Silveira was born in Brasília. He studied in Paris at the École Louis Lumière.

== Biography ==
He worked as camera assistant in Suzana Amaral's 1985 film The Hour of the Star. In 1995 he worked as director of photography of Carla Camurati's Carlota Joaquina, Princess of Brazil. He did also the cinematography for the 2000 film, Me, You, Them, directed by Andrucha Waddington. Silveira directed music videos for Marisa Monte, Os Paralamas do Sucesso and O Rappa, among other artists.

His debut as filmmaker was with the 2005 biopic Two Sons of Francisco, about the sertanejo duo Zezé di Camargo & Luciano. The film became a box office hit in Brazil, with more than five million viewers, becoming the highest-grossing film of the year. Other films directed by Silveira are Once Upon a Time in Rio (2008), Gonzaga — de Pai pra Filho (2012) and À Beira do Caminho (2012).

In 2021 he directed the video-on-demand series Dom for Amazon Prime Video.

== Death ==
Silveira died on 14 May 2022, in Vicência, in the state of Pernambuco. He had a heart attack on the film set, while working on the film Vitória. Brazilian filmmaker Walter Salles mourned his passing, stating that the loss is "irreparable for Brazilian cinema".
