= Two Sons of Francisco =

2005 film directed by Breno Silveira

- Theatrical release poster
- Directed by: Breno Silveira
- Written by: Patrícia Andrade; Carolina Kotscho
- Starring: Márcio Kieling; Thiago Mendonça; Ângelo Antônio
- Edited by: Vicente Kubrusly
- Music by: Caetano Veloso (songs); Guto Graça Melo (score)
- Production companies: Conspiração Filmes; Globo Filmes
- Distributed by: Columbia Pictures (through Sony Pictures Releasing International)
- Release dates: 19 August 2005 (Brazil); 13 July 2006 (U.S.)
- Running time: 132 minutes
- Country: Brazil
- Language: Portuguese
- Budget: R$5.9 million
- Box office: $14 million

Two Sons of Francisco (Portuguese: Dois Filhos de Francisco) is a 2005 Brazilian drama film about the lives of the musicians Zezé Di Camargo & Luciano, directed by Breno Silveira.

The film was one of Brazil's most successful in the last twenty years and the biggest box office draw of 2005. The film grossed over $14 million in Brazil, a record for Brazilian cinema. The film was selected as the Brazilian entry for the Best Foreign Language Film at the 78th Academy Awards, but it was not nominated.

Until 2008, Dois Filhos de Francisco used to be considered the second biggest audience of a Brazilian film (after the 1976 film Dona Flor and Her Two Husbands). In 2009, the blockbuster Se Eu Fosse Você 2, starring Tony Ramos and Glória Pires, replaced Dois Filhos de Francisco as the second biggest audience among the Brazilian films.

== Plot ==
Francisco Camargo is a farmer from Pirenópolis, in the state of Goiás, that has an apparently impossible dream: turn two of his nine children into a sertanejo duo. Initially, he places his hopes in his oldest son, Mirosmar, by giving him a small accordion when he turns 11 years old. Mirosmar and his brother Emival, who plays the guitar, are successful in the village where they live (Capela do Rio do Peixe, a district of Pirenópolis), but after losing the property where they lived in the 1970s, the family has no option but to move to Goiânia.

Mirosmar and Emival then start to perform at the local bus station, trying to earn some money to help at home. There, they met Miranda, a manager who convinces them and their parents to take them on tour for two weeks under the name Camargo & Camarguinho, but only return after four months, and Francisco forbids him to take the children on tour again. But after some time, after Miranda shows a change of heart, Francisco agrees to a new, more responsible tour. The brothers are once again successful, performing for big crowds throughout the country. However, a car crash kills Emival, ending the duo's career prematurely.

After almost giving up on the musical career, Mirosmar decides to sing again, now using the artistic name Zezé di Camargo, and moves to São Paulo. He records a solo album, but has no success. Married and with two daughters, Zezé struggles to make ends meet, and the best he can do is getting other duos to sing his songs. He then finds his brother Welson, who wants to sing with him, and adopts the artistic name Luciano. They record an album, and with the help of their father, they manage to get their song "É o Amor" to the top charts, consolidating the duo's success.

== Cast ==
- Márcio Kieling as Zezé di Camargo
- Thiago Mendonça as Luciano Camargo
- Ângelo Antônio as Seu Francisco Camargo
- Dira Paes as D. Helena Camargo
- Paloma Duarte as Zilú
- José Dumont as Miranda
- Dáblio Moreira as Zezé di Camargo (child)
- Wigor Lima as Luciano (child)
- Marcos Henrique as Emival
- Maria Flor as Solange
- Natália Lage as Cleide
- Jackson Antunes as Zé do Fole
- Pedro as Leonardo
- Thiago as Leandro

== Reception ==
=== Critical response ===
Two Sons of Francisco has an approval rating of 80% on review aggregator website Rotten Tomatoes, based on 5 reviews, and an average rating of 6.7/10.

=== Box office ===
The film was number one at the Brazilian box office for 10 weeks, grossing over $14.4 million.

=== Awards and nominations ===
- Havana Film Festival

Audience Award for Best Film – Breno Silveira (won)

- Young Artist Awards

Best Performance in an International Feature Film – Leading Young Performer – Marcos Henrique (won, tie)
Best Performance in an International Feature Film – Leading Young Performer – Dablio Moreira (won, tie)
Best International Family Feature Film (nominated)

== See also ==
- List of submissions to the 78th Academy Awards for Best Foreign Language Film
- List of Brazilian submissions for the Academy Award for Best Foreign Language Film
