= Dirty Hearts =

2011 film directed by Vicente Amorim

- Directed by: Vicente Amorim
- Screenplay by: David França Mendes
- Based on: Corações Sujos by Fernando Morais
- Produced by: Vicente Amorim| João Daniel Tikhomiroff; Gil Ribeiro; Michel Tikhomiroff
- Starring: Tsuyoshi Ihara; Takako Tokiwa; Eiji Okuda; Shun Sugata; Kimiko Yo; Eduardo Moscovis; Celine Fukumoto
- Cinematography: Rodrigo Monte
- Edited by: Diana Vasconcellos
- Music by: Akihiko Matsumoto
- Distributed by: Downtown Filmes
- Release dates: October 13, 2011 (Festival do Rio); July 17, 2012 (Brazil)
- Running time: 90 minutes
- Country: Brazil
- Languages: Portuguese; Japanese
- Budget: R$8 million

Dirty Hearts (汚れた心, Kegareta Kokoro; Brazilian Portuguese: Corações Sujos) is a 2011 Brazilian historical drama-thriller film directed by Vicente Amorim. It is based on the true story of Shindo Renmei, a pro-Imperial Japan terrorist organization composed of Japanese immigrants in Brazil, which refused to accept Japanese surrender in World War II. The film stars Tsuyoshi Ihara, Takako Tokiwa, Eiji Okuda, Shun Sugata, Kimiko Yo, and Eduardo Moscovis. It is based on a 2000 non-fiction book by journalist Fernando Morais.

The film was premiered at Festival do Rio on October 13, 2011, and was released in Brazil on August 17, 2012. It received positive reviews and won Brazilian Academy Film Awards for Best Screenplay and Best Art Direction, out of 10 nominations.

== Plot ==
In 1945, news of the Surrender of Japan was received with wide skepticism by most Japanese immigrants in Brazil, who assumed it be mere Allied propaganda. Those who did accept the truth are seen as traitors, "dirty hearts", who dishonor the emperor; patriotic-turned-terrorist organization Shindo Renmei takes in their own hands the duty of killing said traitors.

The movie is told from the point of view of the wife of a Shindo Renmei member, who can't help but witness her husband lose himself in fanaticism and bloodshed.

== Cast ==
- Tsuyoshi Ihara as Takahashi (Japanese: 高橋, romanized: Takahashi)
- Takako Tokiwa as Miyuki (Japanese: みゆき, romanized: Miyuki), Takahashi's wife.
- Eiji Okuda as Colonel Watanabe (Japanese: 陸軍大佐 渡辺, romanized: Rikugun-Taisa Watanabe), a former Japanese Imperial Army officer.
- Shun Sugata as Sasaki (Japanese: 佐々木, romanized: Sasaki)
- Kimiko Yo as Naomi (Japanese: ナオミ, romanized: Naomi), Sasaki's wife.
- Eduardo Moscovis as the Deputy Delegate.
- Celine Fukumoto as Akemi (Japanese: あけみ, romanized: Akemi), the daughter of Naomi and Sasaki.
- André Frateschi as Cabo Garcia
- Ken Kaneko as Matsuda (Japanese: 松田, romanized: Matsuda)
- Issamu Yazaki as Aoki (Japanese: 青木, romanized: Aoki)

== Production ==
The film was shot in locations around Paulínia, São Paulo.

Ken Kaneko was a veteran Japanese-Brazilian actor who had lived for more than six decades in Brazil, arguably the oldest and most well known Japanese actor working in the country. He considered his role as a highlight of his career.

Issamu Yazaki was not a professional actor, but a farmer from São Paulo.

== See also ==
- Gaijin - Ama-me Como Sou
