= Artificial Paradises (film) =

2012 film by Marcos Prado

- Brazilian theatrical poster
- Directed by: Marcos Prado
- Written by: Pablo Padilla; Cristiano Gualda; Marcos Prado
- Produced by: José Padilha
- Starring: Nathalia Dill; Luca Bianchi; Lívia de Bueno
- Cinematography: Lula Carvalho
- Edited by: Quito Ribeiro
- Music by: Rodrigo Coelho
- Production company: Zazen Produções
- Distributed by: Nossa Distribuidora (Brazil)
- Release date: 4 May 2012 (Brazil)
- Running time: 96 minutes
- Country: Brazil
- Language: Portuguese
- Budget: R$ 10,500,000

Artificial Paradises (Portuguese: Paraísos Artificiais) is a 2012 Brazilian drama film directed by Marcos Prado and starring Nathalia Dill, Luca Bianchi and Lívia de Bueno.

== Plot ==
Erika (Nathalia Dill) is a successful DJ and friend of Lara (Livia de Bueno). During a festival where Erika was working, they met Nando (Luca Bianchi) and, together, they live an intense moment. However, soon after the trio split up. Years after Erika and Nando are reunited in Amsterdam, where they fall in love. But just Erika remembers the real motive why they moved away shortly after they met, years before.

== Cast ==
- Nathalia Dill as Érika
- Luca Bianchi as Nando
- Lívia de Bueno as Lara
- Bernardo Melo Barreto as Patrick
- César Cardadeiro as Lipe
- Divana Brandão as Márcia
- Emílio Orciollo Netto as Mouse
- Roney Villela as Mark
- Cadu Fávero as Anderson
- Sacha Bali as Pierre

== Production ==
The Artificial Paradises name was inspired by the title of the book of the same name by Baudelaire. "I read the book and thought the title fit perfectly in the film, although addressing another era, the mid-19th century, and the consumption of other drugs, wine, opium and hashish," admits Prado.

Filming took place between 18 October and 25 November in Praia do Paiva, in Recife, and also in Rio de Janeiro, in the traditional Arpoador beach. Some external scenes were filmed in Amsterdam.

== Music ==
The original soundtrack of the film was produced by Rodrigo Coelho and Gustavo MM.

- Faxing Berlin - Deadmau5
- First_Brain - Kaki King
- Shaolin Satellite - Thievery Corporation
- Out Here. In There. - Sidsel Endresen & Bugge Wesseltoft
- Ahuvati - Kaki King
- Daydream - Ash Ra Tempel
- Quagga - Magenetrixx
- No Rush - Frogacult
- Phase Shift - Magnetrixx
- Drumming Headquarters - mycel - Frogacult
- Nick Drake Pot Pourri - Mogwai
- Skazi - XTC - Skazi
- Tohuwabohu - Magnetrixx
- Suppencaspa - Magnetrixx
- Lemmink - Magnetrixx
- Outhouse (Main Mix) - Nathan Fake
- Ups & Downs - Perfect Stranger (artist) Re Edit - Eitan Reiter
- Second Brain - Kaki King
- Brazil - Deadmau5
- Burn Girl Prom Queen - Mogwai
- No Rush - Frogacult
- Ponta Pé - Renato Cohen
- Coco - Pedra Branca
- Metamusica - Pedra Branca
- True Story - Flow & Zeo
- I Use to Say - Flow & Zeo
- Paraísos Artificiais - Gui Boratto

== See also ==
- List of films featuring hallucinogens
