= The Music According to Antonio Carlos Jobim =

2012 film by Nelson Pereira dos Santos

- Film poster
- Directed by: Nelson Pereira dos Santos; Dora Jobim
- Written by: Nelson Pereira dos Santos; Miúcha
- Produced by: Ivelise Ferreira; Nelson Pereira dos Santos
- Music by: Paulo Jobim
- Production company: Regina Filmes
- Distributed by: Sony Pictures
- Release date: January 20, 2012
- Running time: 88 minutes
- Country: Brazil
- Language: Portuguese

The Music According to Antonio Carlos Jobim (Portuguese: A Música Segundo Tom Jobim) is a 2012 Brazilian documentary film, directed by Nelson Pereira dos Santos and Dora Jobim that tells the history of the singer and songwriter Tom Jobim.

== Synopsis ==
The movie tells the story of one of the biggest names in Brazilian Music, Antônio Carlos Jobim, famous for songs like "Garota de Ipanema", "Chega de Saudade" e "Águas de março". It shows the influence of classical music on his works and his partnership with Vinicius de Moraes.
