= Nationalization campaign =

Vargas-era Brazilian anti-immigrant campaign

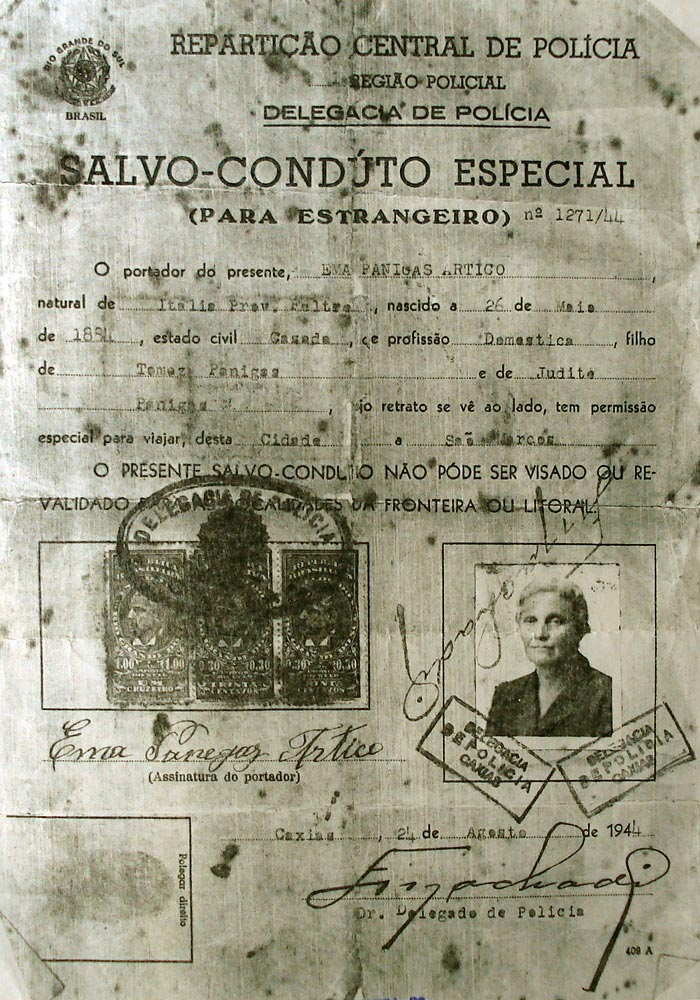
Authorization issued in favor of Ema Panigas Artico, an Italian immigrant, for her trip from Caxias do Sul to São Marcos, 1944

The so-called nationalization campaign (Portuguese: Campanha de nacionalização), was the set of measures taken by the Brazilian government during the Estado Novo of Getúlio Vargas to reduce the influence of foreign immigrant communities in the country and force their integration with the Brazilian population.

Some immigrant groups were considered more apt to be integrated; others were considered incapable due to factors such as their native language, their religion and their profession.

== Background ==
Since the 19th century, groups of immigrants began to arrive in Brazil encouraged by the imperial State. The first attempts to establish immigrant colonies took place in Bahia (1818) and Rio de Janeiro (1819), but were not successful. As early as 1824, the imperial government founded the first German colony in São Leopoldo. The immigration policy undertaken in this period foresaw the occupation of land by forming small properties.

Until the end of the 1930s, effective policies had not yet been instituted to integrate foreigners residing in the country. Before that period, sporadic and temporary actions were promoted, as during the First World War, when intervention measures in the press and in schools of German origin were carried out. These operations took place with the goal of modifying "the school curricula, with the bilingual teaching requirement and the introduction of the subjects of history and geography of Brazil, in addition to the Portuguese language". However, these actions, by themselves, were not able to promote concrete changes in the school organization of foreign colonies.

During the Estado Novo, an intense campaign against culturally distinct behaviors was carried out in Brazil. Among the goals of the period was to consolidate the profile of what the government deemed the "ideal Brazilian": white, Catholic, of Portuguese descent and a good worker. To reach the considered perfect model of nationality, it was necessary to "nationalize" the entire population residing in Brazil. Thus, in addition to investments in civic education for Brazilians, special measures were taken in regards to immigrant communities, which should break fully with their culture of origin and "become Brazilian" as quickly as possible.

== The campaign ==
In a first phase, in 1938, the campaign addressed the "nationalization" of education with the obligation of teaching Portuguese in schools; it was made mandatory for schools to have Brazilian names; only native Brazilians were allowed to hold management positions; teachers had to be native Brazilians or naturalized graduates from Brazilian schools; classes should be taught in Portuguese; the teaching of foreign languages was prohibited for children under 14 years of age; prohibition of grants from foreign governments and institutions; institution of the compulsory subjects of moral and civic education and physical education (which had to be taught by military instructors).

In 1939 new measures were implemented, such as the prohibition of speaking foreign languages in public, including during religious ceremonies (the Brazilian Army was supposed to supervise the "zones of foreign settlement"). Cultural and recreational associations had to close all activities that could be associated with other cultures. The government instituted the concept of "language crime".

The media were also affected, with the censorship of radio programs and restrictions on foreign-language press. In a first phase, newspapers were obliged to have a Brazilian editor (in charge of censorship) and were prohibited from publishing bilingual editions and obliged to publish patriotic articles by Brazilian authors. Then came the definitive ban, with the disappearance of most of the affected newspapers and magazines. Street names, signs and posters of stores and factories, and the names of clubs (including football clubs) and associations were affected.

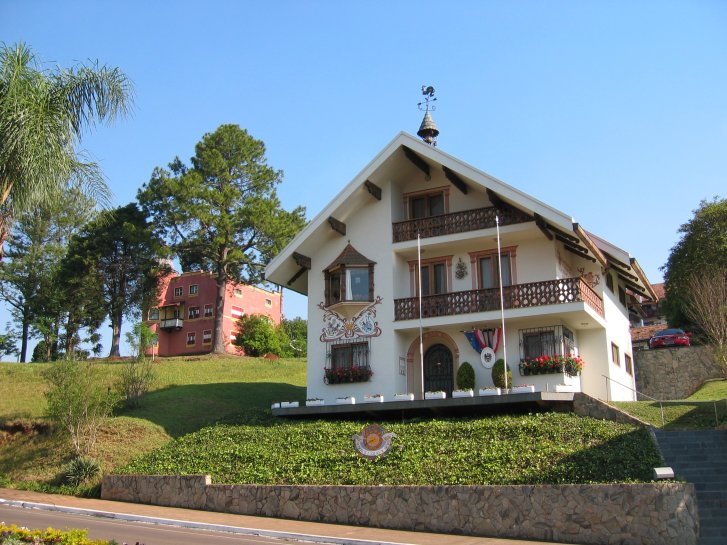
The city of Treze Tílias, in Santa Catarina, had to be renamed from its original German name: Dreizehnlinden

Among the affected nationalities were Ashkenazi Jews, especially those who spoke German or Yiddish, with anti-Jewish campaigns taking place in several Brazilian states. In Rio Grande do Sul, they were significant, as the state had received several immigrants in the first decade of the 20th century, due to agreements between Brazilian authorities and the Jewish Colonization Association. Among other charges, Jews were accused of forming international gangs, with the aim of bringing 4,000 immigrants illegally onto Brazilian soil, as well as being violators of women.

In 1942, with Brazil's entry into the Second World War, the repression of nationalities linked to the Axis Powers was intensified: Germans, Italians and Japanese. Restrictions on individual freedoms were announced: need for an authorization to travel within the country; seizure of books, magazines, newspapers and documents, with the destruction of part of the historical memory of immigration; and eventual imprisonment of those who did not speak Portuguese.

In August 1942, in Pelotas, the streets of the city were taken over by an angry mob, which violently attacked commercial businesses owned by German-Brazilians and German immigrants. Even the São João church, belonging to the German Protestant community, located in Passo do Santana, currently the municipality of Cerrito (at that time it was still part of the municipality of Pelotas) was burned inside.

== See also ==
- Immigration to Brazil
- Riograndenser Hunsrickisch
- Talian
