= Heleno =

2011 film directed by José Henrique Fonseca

- Theatrical release poster
- Directed by: José Henrique Fonseca
- Written by: Fernando Castets; Felipe Bragança; José Henrique Fonseca
- Produced by: Rodrigo Santoro; Rodrigo Teixeira; Eduardo Pop
- Starring: Rodrigo Santoro; Angie Cepeda; Alinne Moraes; Erom Cordeiro; Othon Bastos
- Cinematography: Walter Carvalho
- Edited by: Sergio Mekler
- Music by: Berna Ceppas
- Production companies: Downtown Filmes; Goritzia Filmes
- Distributed by: Screen Media Films
- Release dates: September 12, 2011 (Toronto International Film Festival); March 30, 2012 (Brazil)
- Running time: 116 minutes
- Country: Brazil
- Language: Portuguese

Heleno is a 2011 Brazilian biographical drama film directed by José Henrique Fonseca. It stars and was produced by Brazilian actor Rodrigo Santoro.

== Plot ==
It tells the story of Heleno de Freitas (Rodrigo Santoro), a legendary football star who played for Botafogo during the 1940s. Most of all, Heleno's self-destructive behaviour turned him into a myth.

== See also ==
- List of black-and-white films produced since 1970
