= 2 Coelhos =

2012 film by Afonso Poyart

- Directed by: Afonso Poyart
- Written by: Afonso Poyart; Izaías Almada
- Produced by: Afonso Poyart; André Poyart; Angela Farinello
- Starring: Alessandra Negrini; Fernando Alves Pinto; Caco Ciocler; Marat Descartes; Thaíde; Thogun; Robson Nunes
- Cinematography: Carlos André Zalasik
- Edited by: Lucas Gonzaga; Afonso Poyart; André Toledo
- Music by: André Abujamra
- Production company: Black Maria Filmes
- Distributed by: Imagem Filmes
- Release date: 20 January 2012
- Running time: 108 minutes
- Country: Brazil
- Language: Portuguese
- Budget: R$ 3.500.000
- Box office: R$ 3,828,975

2 Coelhos (lit. '2 Rabbits') is a 2012 Brazilian action thriller film written and directed by Afonso Poyart. The film features innovations that were not common in Brazilian films, including explosions, animations, elaborate special effects and pop culture references. It was released in Brazil on January 20, 2012.

== Plot ==
Edgar is arrested for killing a woman and child in a car crash, but is bailed out by state representative Jader Kerleis. After two years on vacation in Miami, Florida, Edgar returns to the city of São Paulo with a plot to pit Jader, infamous for multiple corruption cases, against Maicon, a criminal notorious for bribing influential politicians to keep him free, to bring both of them to justice.

== Cast ==
- Fernando Alves Pinto as Edgar
- Alessandra Negrini as Julia
- Caco Ciocler as Walter
- Marat Descartes as Maicon
- Roberto Marchese as Jader
- Thaíde as Velinha
- Thogun as Bolinha
- Neco Villa Lobos as Henrique
- Robson Nunes as Cleyton
- Norival Rizzo as Nestor
- Aldine Muller as Sophia
- Yoram Blaschkauer as Robério

== Music ==
- Radiohead - "Exit Music (For a Film)"
- Matanza - "Imbecil"
- Tom Waits - "I'm still here"
- Titãs - "Será que é isso que necessito?"
- Thirty Seconds to Mars - "Kings and Queens"
- Lenine - "Paciência"

== American remake ==
Tango Pictures bought the rights to remake this film with a title Two Rabbits. The film will be the second project for the development of new production, directed by Andrew Lazar, Christina Lurie and Steven Shainberg. Afonso Poyart says it should take the executive production, but not the direction. Poyart said, "The idea is to make another movie. At the moment, the Tango is hiring writers that will give a new treatment history and acclimation to the American public". The budget of the film should cost between $10 million and 12 million.
