= List of Brazilian co-produced films =

This is a list of international co-production films with Brazil.

== List ==
Title	Director	Co-produced with	Genre	Cast	Notes	Ref
31 minutos, la película	Álvaro Díaz; Pedro Peirano	Chile; Spain	Animation	Alvaro Díaz, Pedro Peirano, Rodrigo Salinas, Daniel Castro		
360	Fernando Meirelles	Austria; France; United Kingdom	Drama	Anthony Hopkins, Jude Law, Rachel Weisz, Ben Foster		
The ABC of Love	Eduardo Coutinho, Rodolfo Kuhn, Helvio Soto	Argentina	Drama	Jorge Rivera López, Vera Vianna, Reginaldo Faria, Susana Rinaldi, Federico Luppi		
Amazonia	Thierry Ragobert	France	Documentary			
Anba dlo	Luiza Calagian, Rosa Caldeira	Cuba, Haiti	Short drama	Berline Charles		
A Pelada	Damien Chemin	Belgium	Comedy	Kika Farias, Bruno Pêgo, Tuca Andrada, Karen Junqueira		
Area Q	Gerson Sanginitto	United States	Science fiction	Isaiah Washington, Tania Khalill, Murilo Rosa		
Behind the Sun	Walter Salles	France; Switzerland	Drama	Rodrigo Santoro, José Dumont, Rita Assemany		
Between Valleys	Philippe Barcinski	Germany; Uruguay	Drama	Melissa Vettore, Ângelo Antônio, Daniel Hendler		
BirdWatchers	BirdWatchers	Italy	Drama	Claudio Santamaria, Alicélia Batista Cabreira, Chiara Caselli		
Black Orpheus	Marcel Camus	France; Italy	Comedy	Breno Mello, Marpessa Dawn, Lourdes de Oliveira, Léa Garcia		
Blindness	Fernando Meirelles	Canada; Japan	Drama	Julianne Moore, Mark Ruffalo, Gael García Bernal, Danny Glover, Yoshino Kimura, Alice Braga		
Bollywood Dream	Beatriz Seigner	India	Comedy	Paula Braun, Nataly Cabanas, Mohana Krishna, Lorena Lobato		
Cabezas cortadas	Glauber Rocha	Spain	Drama	Pierre Clémenti, Francisco Rabal		
Carandiru	Hector Babenco	Argentina	Drama	Luiz Carlos Vasconcelos, Rodrigo Santoro, Milton Gonçalves, Lázaro Ramos, Caio Blat, Milhem Cortaz, Wagner Moura		
Central Station	Walter Salles	France	Drama	Fernanda Montenegro, Matheus Nachtergaele, Marília Pêra, Vinícius de Oliveira		
A Chrysanthemum Bursts in Cincoesquinas	Daniel Burman	Argentina; France; Spain	Drama	José Luis Alfonzo, Pastora Vega, Martin Kalwill		
Estômago	Marcos Jorge	Italy	Comedy	João Miguel, Fabiula Nascimento, Babu Santana, Alexander Sil, Carlo Briani, Zeca Cenovicz, Paulo Miklos, Jean Pierre Noher		
Flying Virus	Jeff Hare	United States	Horror	Gabrielle Anwar, Rutger Hauer, David Naughton, Craig Sheffer		
Foolish Heart	Héctor Babenco	Argentina; France	Drama	Miguel Ángel Solá, Maria Luísa Mendonça		
Forbidden to Forbid	Jorge Durán	Chile; Spain	Drama	Caio Blat, Maria Flor, Alexandre Rodrigues		
The Great Kilapy	Zézé Gamboa	Angola; Portugal	Comedy	Lázaro Ramos, Pedro Hossi, João Lagarto, Hermila Guedes		
The Guns	Ruy Guerra	Argentina	Drama	Átila Iório, Nelson Xavier, Maria Gladys		
Jubiabá	Nelson Pereira dos Santos	France	Romantic drama	Charles Baiano, Françoise Goussard, Grande Otelo		
Kiss of the Spider Woman	Héctor Babenco	United States	Drama	William Hurt, Raúl Juliá, Sônia Braga, José Lewgoy, Milton Gonçalves		
The Last Stop	Marcio Cury	Lebanon	Drama	Mounir Maasri, Klarah Lobato, Elisa Lucinda		
La suerte en tus manos	Daniel Burman	Argentina; Spain	Comedy	Norma Aleandro, Jorge Drexler, Valeria Bertuccelli, Gabriel Schultz		
Lope	Andrucha Waddington	Spain	Drama	Alberto Ammann, Leonor Watling, Pilar López de Ayala, Antonio de la Torre, Juan Diego, Luis Tosar, Selton Mello, Sonia Braga		
Love and Co	Helvécio Ratton	Portugal	Comedy-drama	Marco Nanini, Patricia Pillar, Alexandre Borges		
Madame Satã	Karim Aïnouz	France	Drama	Lázaro Ramos		
Midnight	Walter Salles, Daniela Thomas	France	Drama	Fernanda Torres, Luiz Carlos Vasconcelos		
Memórias Póstumas	André Klotzel	Portugal	Comedy-drama	Reginaldo Faria, Petrônio Gontijo, Viétia Rocha, Sônia Braga		
The Motorcycle Diaries	Walter Salles	Argentina; Chile; France; Germany; Peru; United Kingdom; United States	Biographical	Gael García Bernal, Rodrigo de la Serna, Mercedes Morán, Jean Pierre Noher, Facundo Espinosa, Mía Maestro		
Only God Knows	Carlos Bolado	Mexico	Drama	Alice Braga, Diego Luna		
On the Road	Walter Salles	Canada; France; United Kingdom; United States	Adventure drama	Sam Riley, Garrett Hedlund, Kristen Stewart, Amy Adams, Tom Sturridge, Danny Morgan, Alice Braga, Elisabeth Moss, Kirsten Dunst, Viggo Mortensen		
País do Desejo	Paulo Caldas	Portugal	Drama	Fábio Assunção, Maria Padilha, Gabriel Braga Nunes		
Perfume de Gardênia	Guilherme de Almeida Prado	Argentina	Drama	Christiane Torloni, José Mayer		
Plastic City	Yu Lik-wai	China; Hong Kong; Japan	Thriller	Anthony Wong, Joe Odagiri, Domingos Antonio		
The Pope's Toilet	César Charlone; Enrique Fernandez	Uruguay	Drama	César Troncoso, Virginia Méndez, Mario Silva		
Praia do Futuro	Karim Aïnouz	Germany	Drama	Wagner Moura, Clemens Schick, Jesuita Barbosa		
Rosa Morena	Carlos Augusto de Oliveira	Denmark	Drama	Anders W. Berthelsen, Bárbara Garcia, David Dencik, Vivianne Pasmanter		
A Samba for Sherlock	Miguel Faria, Jr.	Portugal	Comedy	Joaquim de Almeida, Marco Nanini, Anthony O'Donnell, Maria de Medeiros		
The Seven Headed Lion	Glauber Rocha	France; Italy	Drama	Rada Rassimov, Giulio Brogi, Gabriele Tinti, Jean-Pierre Léaud		
Sonhos de Peixe	Kirill Mikhanovsky	Russia; United States	Drama	José Maria Alves, Rubia Rafaelle, Phellipe Haagensen, Chico Díaz, Yves Hoffer		
Suely in the Sky	Karim Aïnouz	France; Germany; Portugal	Drama	Hermila Guedes		
The Three Marias	Aluizio Abranches	Italy	Drama	Marieta Severo, Julia Lemmertz, Maria Luisa Mendonça, Luiza Mariani		
Turbulence	Ruy Guerra	Cuba; Portugal	Drama	Jorge Perugorría		
