= Lists of Brazilian films =

A list of films produced in Brazil ordered by year and split onto separate pages by decade. For an alphabetical list of films currently on Wikipedia see Category:Brazilian films

== 20th century ==
- List of Brazilian films before 1920
- List of Brazilian films of the 1920s
- List of Brazilian films of the 1930s
- List of Brazilian films of the 1940s
- List of Brazilian films of the 1950s
- List of Brazilian films of the 1960s
- List of Brazilian films of the 1970s
- List of Brazilian films of the 1980s
- List of Brazilian films of the 1990s

== 2000s ==
- List of Brazilian films of 2000
- List of Brazilian films of 2001
- List of Brazilian films of 2002
- List of Brazilian films of 2003
- List of Brazilian films of 2004
- List of Brazilian films of 2005
- List of Brazilian films of 2006
- List of Brazilian films of 2007
- List of Brazilian films of 2008
- List of Brazilian films of 2009

== 2010s ==
- List of Brazilian films of 2010
- List of Brazilian films of 2011
- List of Brazilian films of 2012
- List of Brazilian films of 2013
- List of Brazilian films of 2014
- List of Brazilian films of 2015
- List of Brazilian films of 2016
- List of Brazilian films of 2017
- List of Brazilian films of 2018
- List of Brazilian films of 2019

== 2020s ==
- List of Brazilian films of 2020
- List of Brazilian films of 2021
- List of Brazilian films of 2022
- List of Brazilian films of 2023
- List of Brazilian films of 2024
- List of Brazilian films of 2025
- List of Brazilian films of 2026
- List of Brazilian films of 2027
- List of Brazilian films of 2028

== See also ==
- List of Brazilian co-produced films
- List of years in Brazil
- List of years in Brazilian television
