= List of Brazilian films of the 1990s =

An incomplete list of films produced in Brazil in the 1990s. For an A-Z list of films currently on Wikipedia see Category:Brazilian films.

== 1990 ==
Title	Director	Cast	Genre	Notes
1990
ABC da Greve	Leon Jordan			Filmed in 1979.
Ameríndia - Memória, Remorso e Compromisso no V Centenário				
Assim Na Tela Como No Céu				
Atração Satânica				
Lua de Cristal	Tizuka Yamasaki	Xuxa, Sérgio Mallandro	Comedy-romance	

== 1991 ==
Title	Director	Cast	Genre	Notes
1991
Angola				
Au Revoir, Shirlei				
Aventura, Amor & Transporte Público				
Exposure	Walter Salles			
At Play in the Fields of the Lord	Héctor Babenco	Tom Berenger, Tom Waits		Brazilian-American production.

== 1992 ==
Title	Director	Cast	Genre	Notes
1992
A Babel da Luz				
Azul Caixão de Anjo				
O Assalto				
Perfume de Gardênia	Guilherme de Almeida Prado	Christiane Torloni, José Mayer		
Zuleika				

== 1993 ==
Title	Director	Cast	Genre	Notes
1993
A Arca dos Zo'é				
Alma Corsária	Carlos Reichenbach			
Atrás das Grades				
O Zeppelin Passou por Aqui				

== 1994 ==
Title	Director	Cast	Genre	Notes
1994
America au Pouivre				
Amor!				
Anjo Embarcadiço				
Babaçu				
The Third Bank of the River	Nelson Pereira dos Santos			Entered into the 44th Berlin International Film Festival

== 1995 ==
Title	Director	Cast	Genre	Notes
1995
Alva Paixão				
Carlota Joaquina, Princess of Brazil	Carla Camurati	Marco Nanini	Historical biopic	
As Feras	Walter Hugo Khouri	Nuno Leal Maia, Cláudia Liz, Lúcia Veríssimo	Drama	Only released in 2001
Foreign Land	Walter Salles, Daniela Thomas	Fernando Alves Pinto, Fernanda Torres	Drama	
O Quatrilho				1996 Academy Awards nomination
Super-Colosso - Uma Aventura de Cinema da TV Colosso	Luiz Ferré	Luana Piovani	Family film	Movie version of Rede Globo's popular puppet series TV Colosso
Zweig: A Morte em Cena				

== 1996 ==
Title	Director	Cast	Genre	Notes
1996
A Alma do Negócio				
Adágio ao Sol				
Anjos Urbanos				
Antonio Carlos Gomes				
How Angels Are Born	Murilo Salles	Larry Pine, Priscila Assum, Silvio Guindane	Crime drama	
Perfumed Ball	Lírio Ferreira, Paulo Caldas	Duda Mamberti, Luiz Carlos Vasconcelos, Aramis Trindade, Chico Diaz	Drama	
Tieta of Agreste	Carlos Diegues			

== 1997 ==
Title	Director	Cast	Genre	Notes
1997
Agnus Gay				
Anaconda				
Anahy de las Misiones				
Angelo Anda Sumido				
Aqui jaz Helena				
Até Logo, Mamãe				
Four Days in September	Bruno Barreto		Thriller	Entered into the 47th Berlin International Film Festival
O Sertão das Memórias			Documentary	
O Amor está no Ar				

== 1998 ==
Title	Director	Cast	Genre	Notes
1998
Ação Entre Amigos				
Alô?!				
Amassa Que Elas Gostam				
Ame o Garoto Que Segura a Faca				
Amores				
Antropocropofagus				
Athos				
Atlântico Negro - Na Rota dos Orixás				
Bacanal no Taquaral				
Central Station	Walter Salles	Fernanda Montenegro	Drama	Golden Globe Award for Best Foreign Language Film; Nominated – Golden Globe Award for Best Actress in a Motion Picture Drama; Nominated – Academy Award for Best Actress in a Leading Role; Nominated – Academy Award for Best Foreign Language Film; Golden Bear (Berlin)
Foolish Heart	Hector Babenco			Co-production with Argentina
Love and Co	Helvécio Ratton	Marco Nanini, Patricia Pillar, Alexandre Borges	Drama	Co-produced with Portugal
Midnight	Walter Salles, Daniela Thomas	Fernanda Torres, Luiz Carlos Vasconcelos	Drama	

== 1999 ==
Title	Director	Cast	Genre	Notes
1999
Amor Que Fica				
Ardil				
Até que a Vida nos Separe				
Babilônia 2000				
O Amigo das Almas do Além				
A Glass of Rage	Aluizio Abranches	Alexandre Borges, Julia Lemmertz	Drama	
Orfeu	Carlos Diegues			Greek legend; music by Antonio Carlos Jobim and Caetano Veloso
Oriundi	Anthony Quinn	Anthony Quinn	Drama	
Por Trás do Pano	Luiz Villaça	Denise Fraga, Pedro Cardoso, Luís Melo, Ester Góes, Marisa Orth	Drama	
Traveller	Paulo César Saraceni			Entered into the 21st Moscow International Film Festival
Xuxa Requebra	Tizuka Yamasaki	Xuxa Meneghel, Daniel	Comedy, romance	
Zoando na TV				
