= List of Brazilian films of 2002 =

A list of films produced in Brazil in 2002 (see 2002 in film):

== 2002 ==
Title	Director	Cast	Genre	Notes
Açaí com Jabá				
Armadilha para Turistas				
Armas e Paz				
Bus 174	José Padilha	Sandro Rosa do Nascimento	Documentary	Documentary about bus hijacking
City of God	Fernando Meirelles, Kátia Lund	Alice Braga, Matheus Nachtergaele, Seu Jorge	Crime drama	Four Academy Award nominations, screened at Cannes
Desmundo	Alain Fresnot	Simone Spoladore, Osmar Prado, Caco Ciocler	Drama	
Durval Discos	Anna Muylaert	Ary França, Etty Fraser, Marisa Orth, Isabela Guasco, Letícia Sabatella	Comedy drama	
Errada Fruta Cor	Chris Wedge			
Eu não Conhecia Tururu			Drama	
Gilberto Gil - Kaya N'Gandaya				
Histórias do Olhar				
Madame Satã	Karim Aïnouz	Lázaro Ramos	Biographical	Screened at the 2002 Cannes Film Festival
Mango Yellow	Cláudio Assis	Matheus Nachtergaele, Jonas Bloch, Dira Paes, Chico Díaz, Leona Cavalli	Drama	24 wins and 13 nominations at various events
Nasceu o Bebê Diabo em São Paulo			Documentary	
Something in the Air	Helvecio Ratton	Alexandre Moreno, Babu Santana, Adolfo Moura, Benjamim Abras	Drama	
Overwhelming Women			Comedy	
O Príncipe	Ugo Giorgetti	Eduardo Tornaghi, Bruna Lombardi, Ricardo Blat, Ewerton de Castro, Otávio Augusto	Drama	
O Santo Mágico			Drama	
Que sera, sera	Murilo Salles	Marília Pêra, Rocco Pitanga	Comedy	Entered into the 25th Moscow International Film Festival
The Three Marias	Aluizio Abranches	Marieta Severo, Julia Lemmertz, Maria Luisa Mendonça, Luiza Mariani	Drama	
Two Lost in a Dirty Night	José Joffily	Roberto Bomtempo, Débora Falabella	Adventure	
Two Summers	Jorge Furtado	André Arteche, Ana Maria Mainieri, Pedro Furtado	Comedy	
Xuxa e os Duendes 2 - No Caminho das Fadas	Paulo Sérgio de Almeida, Rogério Gomes, Márcio Vito	Xuxa, Luciano Szafir, Deborah Secco	Family	
Zico	Elizeu Ewald			

== See also ==
- 2002 in Brazil
- 2002 in Brazilian television
