= List of Brazilian films of 2009 =

A list of films produced in Brazil in 2009 (see 2009 in film):

== 2009 ==
Title	Director	Cast	Genre	Notes
Adrift	Heitor Dhalia	Laura Neiva, Vincent Cassel, Débora Bloch, Camilla Belle	Drama	Un Certain Regard at the 2009 Cannes Film Festival
The Assailant	João Daniel Tikhomiroff	Aílton Carmo, Jéssica Barbosa, Flávio Rocha, Irandhir Santos	Action, drama	
Beyond Ipanema	Guto Barra & Béco Dranoff	Seu Jorge, Milton Nascimento, Gilberto Gil	Documentary	
Bonitinha mas Ordinária	Moacyr Góes		Drama	
Budapest	Walter Carvalho	Leonardo Medeiros, Gabriella Hámori, Giovanna Antonelli	Drama	
The Eye of the Storm	Eduardo Valente	Marcio Vito, Dedina Bernardelli	Drama	Screened at the 2009 Cannes Film Festival
From Beginning to End	Aluisio Abranches	Rafael Cardoso, João Gabriel Vasconcellos, Júlia Lemmertz, Fábio Assunção	LGBT, drama	
The Happy Cricket and the Giant Bugs	Walbercy Ribas, Rafael Ribas	Vagner Fagundes, Julia Duarte	Animated	
Kafka Goes to the Forest	Daniel Matos	Daniel Matos; Renata Campos	Drama	
Lula, Son of Brazil	Fábio Barreto	Rui Ricardo Dias, Glória Pires, Cléo Pires, Juliana Baroni, Milhem Cortaz	Bio-pic	The film was unanimously chosen by a Ministry of Culture commission as Brazil's submission to the 83rd Academy Award for Best Foreign Language Film.
Peacetime	Daniel Filho	Tony Ramos, Dan Stulbach	Comedy	
Terras	Maya Da-Rin		Documentary	Screened at Premiere Brazil! 2010 film festival at the Museum of Modern Art, 2010
Veronica	Maurício Farias	Andréa Beltrão, Marco Ricca, Matheus de Sá	Thriller	
Xuxa em O Mistério de Feiurinha	Tizuka Yamasaki	Xuxa		

== See also ==
- 2009 in Brazil
- 2009 in Brazilian television
- List of 2009 box office number-one films in Brazil
