= List of 2008 box office number-one films in Brazil =

This is a list of films that placed number one at the weekend box office in Brazil during 2008. Amounts are in Brazilian reais (1 real is equivalent to approximately 0.64 US dollars).

== Number-one films ==
†	This implies the highest-grossing movie of the year.

Date	Film	Gross	Notes
January 6	The Golden Compass	R$1.809.205	
January 13	Meu Nome Não É Johnny	R$2.090.007	Meu Nome Não é Johnny reached number-one in its second week of release. Highest-grossing Brazilian film of 2008.
January 20	I Am Legend	R$4.991.476	Most weeks at #1 in 2008.
January 27	I Am Legend	R$2.905.120	Most weeks at #1 in 2008.
February 3	I Am Legend	R$1.444.430	Most weeks at #1 in 2008.
February 10	I Am Legend	R$1.153.150	Most weeks at #1 in 2008.
February 17	27 Dresses	R$1.047.719	
February 24	Juno	R$1.410.950	
March 2	Rambo	R$1.261.748	
March 9	10,000 BC	R$2.748.109	
March 16	Horton Hears a Who!	R$2.379.690	
March 23	Horton Hears a Who!	R$1.530.593	
March 30	Jumper	R$2.048.878	
April 6	Jumper	R$1.484.585	
April 13	Jumper	R$832.847	
April 20	Superhero Movie	R$2.005.801	
April 27	Superhero Movie	R$1.186.092	
May 4	Iron Man	R$5.680.662	
May 11	Iron Man	R$3.004.645	
May 18	Iron Man	R$2.467.399	
May 25	Indiana Jones and the Kingdom of the Crystal Skull	R$6.038.139	
June 1	The Chronicles of Narnia: Prince Caspian	R$3.756.336	
June 8	The Chronicles of Narnia: Prince Caspian	R$2.577.868	
June 15	The Incredible Hulk	R$2.833.654	
June 22	Get Smart	R$2.026.300	
June 29	WALL-E	R$2.355.592	
July 6	Hancock	R$5.561.912	
July 13	Hancock	R$3.346.785	
July 20	The Dark Knight †	R$7.102.500	Highest-grossing film through 2008
July 27	The Dark Knight †	R$4.992.475	Highest-grossing film through 2008
August 3	The Mummy: Tomb of the Dragon Emperor	R$4.872.112	
August 10	The Mummy: Tomb of the Dragon Emperor	R$1.154.427	
August 17	The Mummy: Tomb of the Dragon Emperor	R$1.799.329	
August 24	Wanted	R$2.238.922	
August 31	Wanted	R$1.385.025	
September 7	Hellboy II: The Golden Army	R$1.355.060	
September 14	Mamma Mia!	R$1.387.125	
September 21	Mamma Mia!	R$1.097.697	
September 28	Eagle Eye	R$861.225	
October 5	Disaster Movie	R$1.949.692	
October 12	Righteous Kill	R$1.471.596	
October 19	My Best Friend's Girl	R$1.091.019	
October 26	High School Musical 3: Senior Year	R$3.919.203	
November 2	High School Musical 3: Senior Year	R$2.011.539	
November 9	Quantum of Solace	R$4.746.672	
November 16	Quantum of Solace	R$2.906.029	
November 23	Quantum of Solace	R$1.804.948	
November 30	Burn After Reading	R$1.082.057	
December 7	Burn After Reading	R$737.876	
December 14	Madagascar: Escape 2 Africa	R$7.501.787	Biggest opening weekend of 2008; overall highest-grossing film of 2008
December 21	Madagascar: Escape 2 Africa	R$4.438.606	
December 28	Madagascar: Escape 2 Africa	R$3.585.993	

== See also ==
- List of Brazilian films of 2008
- List of Brazilian films — Brazilian films by year
