= List of Brazilian films of the 2000s =

This is a list of Brazilian films of the 2000s. For a complete alphabetical list, see Category:Brazilian films.

== 2000 ==
- List of Brazilian films of 2000

== 2001 ==
- List of Brazilian films of 2001

== 2002 ==
- List of Brazilian films of 2002

== 2003 ==
- List of Brazilian films of 2003

== 2004 ==
- List of Brazilian films of 2004

== 2005 ==
- List of Brazilian films of 2005

== 2006 ==
- List of Brazilian films of 2006

== 2007 ==
- List of Brazilian films of 2007

== 2008 ==
- List of Brazilian films of 2008

== 2009 ==
- List of Brazilian films of 2009
