= The Carnivorous Lamb =

1975 novel by Agustin Gomez-Arcos

- Author: Agustin Gomez-Arcos
- Language: French
- Publisher: Plume
- Publication date: 1975
- Award: Prix Hermes award

The Carnivorous Lamb (titled L'Agneau carnivore in the original French version) is a historical fiction novel by Agustin Gomez-Arcos. It was published by the New American Library's Plume in 1975 and won a Prix Hermes award in the same year.

The novel takes place during the 1940s in Francoist Spain and follows the relationship between the narrating protagonist Ignacio and his older brother Antonio. It also explores political and religious themes related to catholicism, anti-fascism and American imperialism. The book has been republished by Arsenal Pulp Press as part of its Little Sister's Classics series.

The Brazilian film From Beginning to End by Aluizio Abranches is loosely based on The Carnivorous Lamb.
