= Last Stop =

(The) Last Stop may refer to:

- In transportation, a term for terminus
- Last Stop (1935 film), a 1935 German romantic comedy film directed by E. W. Emo
- The Last Stop (film), a 2012 Brazilian-Lebanese drama film
- "The Last Stop" (song), a 1998 song by the Dave Matthews Band
- Last Stop (video game), a 2021 video game developed by Variable State
- "Last Stop" (Slow Horses), television episode
- "Last Stop" (Snowpiercer), television episode
- Last Stop, alternate title for Don't Blink, a 2014 horror film
