= List of Brazilian films of 2008 =

A list of films produced in Brazil in 2008 (see 2008 in film):

== 2008 ==
Title	Director	Cast	Genre	Notes
5 Frações de Uma Quase História			Drama	
Um Amor do Outro Lado do Mundo				
Bezerra de Menezes: O Diário de um Espírito	Glauber Filho, Joe Pimentel	Carlos Vereza	Biographical drama	
BirdWatchers	Marco Bechis	Chiara Caselli, Claudio Santamaria	Drama	
Blindness	Fernando Meirelles	Julianne Moore, Danny Glover, Alice Braga	Drama	
Cleópatra			Drama	
Corpo			Drama, thriller	
Coração Vagabundo			Documentary	
Embodiment of Evil	José Mojica Marins	José Mojica Marins, Milhem Cortaz, Jece Valadão, Nara Sakarê	Horror	
Dias e Noites			Drama	
É Proibido Fumar		Gloria Pires	Drama	
Fake Blond			Drama	
Garapa	José Padilha		Documentary	
O Guerreiro Didi e a Ninja Lili	Marcos Figueiredo	Renato Aragão	Comedy	
Linha de Passe	Walter Salles and Daniela Thomas	Vinícius de Oliveira, Sandra Corveloni	Drama	Won the Best Actress Award at the 2008 Cannes Film Festival
Meu Nome Não É Johnny	Mauro Lima	Selton Mello, Cléo Pires, Júlia Lemmertz, Giulio Lopes, Cássia Kiss	Drama	
A Mulher do Meu Amigo			Comedy	
Mulheres Sexo Verdades Mentiras			Drama	
Nome Próprio			Drama	
Os Penetras		Rodrigo Santoro		
Polaróides Urbanas	Miguel Falabella		Comedy	
Porto dos Mortos			Horror, action	
Se Eu Fosse Você 2		Tony Ramos, Gloria Pires, Adriane Galisteu	Comedy	
Sexo com Amor?			Comedy	
Transversais			Documentary	

== See also ==
- 2008 in Brazil
- 2008 in Brazilian television
- List of 2008 box office number-one films in Brazil
