= Xuxinha e Guto contra os Monstros do Espaço =

2005 film by Moacyr Góes and Clewerson Saremba

- Theatrical release poster
- Directed by: Moacyr Góes; Clewerson Saremba
- Written by: Flávio de Souza
- Produced by: Diler Trindade
- Starring: Xuxa Meneghel; Pedro Malta; Flávia Saddy; Bernardo Coutinho; Guilherme Briggs; Gustavo Pereira; Milton Gonçalves
- Narrated by: Xuxa Meneghel
- Music by: Ary Sperling
- Production companies: Diler & Associados; Xuxa Produções; Labocine; Warner Bros. Pictures; Twister; Globo Filmes
- Distributed by: Warner Bros. Pictures
- Release date: December 25, 2005
- Running time: 85 minutes
- Country: Brazil
- Language: Portuguese
- Budget: R$ 6 million
- Box office: R$ 2.9 million

Xuxinha e Guto contra os Monstros do Espaço (transl. Xuxinha and Guto against the Space Monsters) is a 2005 Brazilian animated adventure film written by Flávio de Souza and directed by Moacyr Góes and Clewerson Saremba, produced by Diler Trindade and distributed by Warner Bros. Pictures. Starring Xuxa Meneghel and Pedro Malta, with the participation of the voice actors Flávia Saddy, Bernardo Coutinho, Guilherme Briggs, Gustavo Pereira, Milton Gonçalves.

The film follows Guto, a 7-year-old boy who gets help from his guardian angel - Xuxinha - to fight junk-eating alien monsters from the planet XYZ, and avoid it to invade Pumzão Stream, the neighborhood where Guto and his friend Jonas live. The Pumzão is the ideal place for the invaders, who eat garbage and want to transform the Earth into a dump. The two will go through countless adventures and rely on the help of the wise homeless philosopher Euclides Arquimedes, Detective Txutxucão, and Jonas. But the greatest help comes from Heaven: Guto and Jonas' guardian angels Xuxinha and Biel. The big heroine is the blonde angel girl, who gives up her angelic powers to save Guto and the planet.

Still in 2004, Xuxa Meneghel considered the possibility of producing a cinematographic animation later that year. The project had the first title "Adventures of Xuxinha", but the project was canceled. Almost a year after the first announcement in 2005, Xuxa announced the launch of its first animated film. Betting on a new formula, the TV host left its traditional movie format and bet on an animation.

The film was a box-office bomb, grossing just R$ 2,948,878 from its budget of R$6 million, with an audience of 596,218 spectators, being the worst box office performance of a Xuxa movie since Xuxa Requebra (1999). The film has received negative reviews from specialist critics. A sequel came to be considered, but was canceled due to the film's box office failure.

== Plot ==
Like every 7-year-old, Julian (Pedro Malta) seeks answers and explanations for the existence of some spiritual beings. This is the case with the guardian angels. Xuxa Meneghel, always convinced of their existence, the elves and God, tells the nephew how she met her guardian angel, called Xuxinha.

When Xuxa grew up, she had to go her way without the help of a faithful protector. Xuxinha was given the job of protecting another child: Guto. Perhaps the most damned of all, the angel always had to do the impossible to save him from the confusions and dangers in which he entered. Xuxinha also counts on the aid of Biel, angel of the guard of Jonas, the great companion of adventures of Guto.

One day, the city is invaded by Xyzígenas, garbage-eating aliens from the planet XYZ, which is located in a distant galaxy. They escape from prison knowing that Earth's inhabitants used to throw debris into the streams, polluting all the rivers of the planet, they decided that it was the best place for domination there.

The first resident to believe in the invasion was the wise Euclid Archimedes. All but the detective dog Txutxucão, Guto and Jonas discredited him. Together, they resolve to fight these stinking monsters, who have dominated the entire punch stream. Xuxinha and Biel also resolve to investigate the case, not knowing that this involvement would bring definitive consequences to the life of the angel.

== Cast ==
- Xuxa Meneghel as Herself and narrator
- Pedro Malta as Juliano Narração
- Flávia Saddy as Xuxinha
- Bernardo Coutinho: Guto
- Gustavo Pereira as Jonas
- Guilherme Briggs as Detective Txutxucão / Monsters / Fireman
- Milton Gonçalves as Euclides Arquimedes
- Pedro Henrique Albuquerque as Biel
- Ana Lúcia Menezes as Babies
- Emília Rey as Sarita Malaguenha and Vozeiros
- Felipe Grinnan and Vozeiros
- Fernanda Baronne as Dona Rô and Vozeiros
- Alexandre Moreno as Grilo and Police Officer xyz 2
- Joaquim P.O'rey as Fael
- Júlio Chaves as Pai de Jonas
- Lina Rossana as Velha
- Lúcio Mauro Filho as Sr. Sid
- Luiz Carlos Persy as Robot / Doctor
- Marcelo Coutinho as Police Officer / Police Officer xyz 1 / Driver / Vozeiros
- Márcia Coutinho as Vozeiros
- Márcio Simões as Smart Mice
- Mário Monjardim as Galileu Newton
- Paulo Goulart as São Pedro
- Pedro Lima as Guel
- Tom Cavalcante as Douglas Wender
- Adriano Santos as Police Officer / Firefighter / Douglas Wender / Father of Jonas / Doctor
- Cinthia Delmaschio as Stand in Xuxa Meneghel

== Production ==
Still in 2004, Xuxa Meneghel considered the possibility of producing a film animation later that year. The project had the first title "Aventuras da Xuxinha", and would have as heroine a blonde girl, true miniature of the host. But the project was budgeted by Ancine (Agência Nacional do Cinema), with a forecast of an expense of R$7.5 million reais, which Xuxa and its production considered very high, so the project was postponed to the year 2005, and in its place the TV host debuted Xuxa e o Tesouro da Cidade Perdida at the end of that year (2004). Almost a year after the first announcement, on June 24, 2005 Xuxa announced the release of his first animated film titled Xuxinha e Guto Contra os Monstros do Espaço, which premiered in cinemas all over Brazil in December of that year. Xuxinha e Guto contra os Monstros do Espaço the film is the first Brazilian animation in second and third dimension.

Xuxinha e Guto contra os Monstros do Espaço had a team of 70 animators from Twister studio, it was generated in computer, totally digital technology. The film is equated with Disney animations, but it did not cost 1% of the budget for such productions. The final value reached R$6 million reais, which was hosted by TV Host itself, which boasts of the animation hub created for this production. As in the four previous films of Xuxa, the direction is of Moacyr Góes, the animation director Clewerson Saremba and the production, of Diler & Associates. It took a year to get ready. It is therefore a mixture of cartoon and live action scenes (with actors acting). Betting on a new formula, TV host Xuxa Meneghel abandons its traditional film format and this year reaches theaters in an animation. Director Clewerson Saremba explains that the film was drawn and animated completely on the computer. "The process of animation was based on that of conventional studios. The difference was to change the role for the computer when drawing". It was not by accident that Xuxa and the producer of his films Diler Trindade decided to bet on the animation this year. Clearly, there is an attempt of renewal since, every year, its productions have been earning less at the box office. Xuxa explained that she agrees with the participation of animation characters to reduce production costs:

It has been a while since we matured the possibility of producing a movie with a cartoon. But putting them with me was very expensive. And as the characters Guto, Xuxinha and Txutxucão are very strong, the idea came to put them more than my image, not them counting on me, and yes, I with them.

With a script signed by Flávio de Sousa, the film is faithful to what the presenter believes. "We do not care about being educational. That's up to the school, not the TV Shows and Films," he says. Still, the theme of the film is ecology and the importance of recycling. Despite the small participation in front of the cameras, Xuxa says that she throbbed a lot in the production of the drawing. "I'm a little annoying. Sometimes she thought that Xuxinha looked fat or sneaky, she had to change. Ten seconds of film took a week to be redone. A lot of things have been thrown in the trash, hours of work." The character Xuxinha has been present in the DVDs and TV Shows of Xuxa since 1997, In the same year, the character Guto was created to represent the male children's audience of the new line of baby cleaning products. Xuxa and Pedro Malta are the only real appearances in the film, the other characters are made in computer graphics and dubbed by voice actors.

=== Music ===
The soundtrack of the film of the same name, released in 2005 by Som Livre. The album consists of songs performed by the protagonist, the TV host Xuxa Meneghel and other artists. It consists mainly of the incidental instrumental themes that played in the film, brings only two singers, Abdullah and Xuxa. Plus the track 10 that is interpreted by the actress Naná Tribuzzi. The soundtrack was produced by Ary Sperling.

== Release ==
The first premiere of the film took place on November 27, 2005 in city Armação dos Búzios, in the Rio de Janeiro, at the Búzios Cine Festival. Xuxa also participated in a News conference in São Paulo on December 13 to publicize the film, and she commented on the possibility of the film winning a continuation in 2006: "This first film was to tell the story of the character. If it works out, in the next one I will participate more in the scenes". On December 17, Xuxa checked the result of the film for the first time alone. For the premiere in Rio de Janeiro city, the Queen of the little ones summoned 100 children from the Xuxa Meneghel Foundation and another 50 from the Brazilian Foundation Criança Esperança, who were delighted with the performance of the animated feature, at the time, was wearing the shirt of the film. The film was officially released on December 25 in more than 180 rooms in the country.

The film was released on DVD in June 2006. In addition to the movie, there will be plenty of games and jokes, making of and voice-over scenes in the extras.

== Reception ==
=== Critical reception ===
The film received an approval rating of 1.4 in the review aggregator CINEPLAYERS, based on 55 votes. The audiences surveyed for AdoroCinema gave the film a "3.0" rating and three stars out of five. IMDb another review aggregate, gave it a score of 1.3 based on 441 critics. The film was considered by the public of the Brazilian entertainment website Omelete as the worst of the year 2005.

The film received mixed to negative reviews from critics. A critic of the Cineclick considered production "more bearable" than the previous ones, writing that the film "should please children. Animation techniques are quite simple, like the screenplay, and music is present at all times - more or less like the Scooby-Doo cartoons, when the action stops and gives way to a musical. Rubens Ewald Filho of UOL, considered the film reasonable and giving two stars of five and. criticized him writing that the film does not have "especially interesting, although the film has educational pretensions."

=== Box office ===
After its release, Xuxinha e Guto contra os Monstros do Espaço obtained a bad number of box office in comparison with the previous ones, the production was in 9º place with 478,002 spectators. Didi, o Caçador de Tesouros (en:Didi, the Treasure Hunter), for example, was released in the same period and managed to be in 5th with 877,585 box office. The result of his box office was 596,218 box office, being the first Xuxa film, since Xuxa Requebra (1999) to not get more than 1 million viewers. The film was the fifth biggest Brazilian box office of 2006, being the forty-ninth most seen of 2006. With a gross of more than 2,948,878.00 according to Ancine.

== See also ==
- List of Brazilian films of the 2000s
- List of films about angels
