= From Beginning to End =

2009 film by Aluizio Abranches

- Theatrical release poster
- Portuguese: Do Começo ao Fim
- Directed by: Aluizio Abranches
- Written by: Aluizio Abranches
- Produced by: Aluizio Abranches; Fernando Libonati; Marco Nanini; Iker Monfort
- Starring: Rafael Cardoso; João Gabriel Vasconcellos; Júlia Lemmertz; Fábio Assunção
- Cinematography: Ueli Steiger
- Edited by: Fábio S. Limma
- Music by: André Abujambra
- Production company: Lama Filmes
- Distributed by: TLA Releasing
- Release dates: November 12, 2009 (Mix Brasil); November 27, 2009 (Brazil)
- Running time: 96 minutes
- Country: Brazil
- Languages: Portuguese; Spanish; English
- Budget: $1 million
- Box office: $400,422

From Beginning to End (Portuguese: Do Começo ao Fim) is a 2009 Brazilian romantic drama film directed by Aluizio Abranches, starring Fábio Assunção, Júlia Lemmertz, Gabriel Kaufmann, Lucas Cotrim, João Gabriel Vasconcellos and Rafael Cardoso. It premiered in Brazil on November 27, 2009. The film deals with homosexuality and incest, two types of relationships that are often considered to be taboo. Abranches claims that his only intention was to tell a love story.

The release of the film in Brazil, with only nine copies, was seen by almost 100,000 spectators, leading the film to be on the list of the top 10 most watched Brazilian films of 2009. It was shown in more than 30 national and international festivals, and it was also commercialized in more than 30 countries. In 2010 it was released in DVD in Brazil with success. In France, after a very successful premiere in the cinemas, the first edition of the DVD and Blu-ray was sold out in less than two weeks, and it became a best seller internationally through websites such as Fnac and Amazon.

== Plot ==
- 1986 — Thomás is born with his eyes closed, and he does not open them for several weeks following the birth. Julieta, his mother, is unconcerned, believing that when Thomás is ready and wants to open his eyes, he will. These events instill a strong belief in free will in young Thomás. Two weeks after his birth, Thomás opens his eyes, apparently to look directly at his five-year-old half-brother Francisco.
- 1992 — Julieta is a wife and a loving mother, working in a hospital emergency department. Her free-spirited youngest son, Thomás, is the product of her marriage to her second husband Alexandre. Pedro, her first husband and father of her eldest son Francisco, lives in Argentina. Pedro and Julieta remain good friends. During childhood, Francisco and Thomás are very close, perhaps too close according to Pedro, with whom they spend a Christmas holiday in Buenos Aires. Julieta is aware of their close relationship and tries to remain understanding. Not long later, Pedro dies.
- 2008 — Years later, when Francisco is 27 and Thomás 22, Julieta dies. The brothers become lovers and a love story ensues. Thomás is invited to live and train in Russia for a few years in preparation for the Olympics. Though it is the first time they will be apart, Thomás leaves. Francisco struggles without Thomás. He meets a woman in a club and though he tries to pursue a relationship with her, they both realize he is dedicated to someone else. Unable to be apart any longer, Francisco travels to Russia and the brothers happily reunite.

== Cast ==
- Rafael Cardoso as Thomás
  - Gabriel Kaufmann as Thomás at age six
- João Gabriel Vasconcellos as Francisco
  - Lucas Cotrim as Francisco at age 11
- Júlia Lemmertz as Julieta
- Fábio Assunção as Alexandre
- Jean Pierre Noher as Pedro
- Louise Cardoso as Rosa
- Mausi Martínez

== Production ==
=== Filming ===
The film was filmed almost entirely in Rio de Janeiro, Brazil, with parts filmed in Buenos Aires, Argentina.

=== Music ===
The soundtrack was released in December 2009 and includes music by Brazilian artists such as Maria Bethânia, Angela Ro Ro, Simone and Zizi Possi.

Original Motion Picture Soundtrack
No.	Title	Performer(s)	Length
1.	"O Leãozinho"	Caetano Veloso	3:39
2.	"Lágrimas de Diamantes"	Paulinho Moska	4:15
3.	"Ne me quitte pas"	Maria Gadú	5:47
4.	"Tango pra Tereza"	Ney Matogrosso	4:05
5.	"Elevador"	André Abujamra	3:53
6.	"Porque Eu Sei Que é Amor"	Titãs	4:17
7.	"Folhas de Outono"	Zizi Possi and Ana Carolina	3:46
8.	"Presente Passado"	Isabela Taviani	4:36
9.	"Um Dia Um Adeus"	Vanessa da Mata	4:14
10.	"Seu Olhar"	Seu Jorge	4:00
11.	"Bilhete no Fim"	Paulinho Moska	3:58
12.	"Vidas Inteiras"	Adriana Calcanhotto	4:12
13.	"Repare nos Meus Olhos"	Zélia Duncan	3:49
14.	"Canção de Amor"	Bebel Gilberto	4:45
15.	"Bem Pra Você"	Simone	3:44
16.	"Se Chovesse Você"	Eliana Printes and Chico César	4:58
17.	"Saudade"	Lenine and Maria Bethânia	3:45
18.	"Todo Sentimento"	Chico Buarque	5:04
19.	"Só Vou Gostar de Quem Gosta de Mim"	Eliana Printes	5:18
20.	"Outono"	Angela Ro Ro	3:29
21.	"Suburbano Coração"	Monica Salmaso	3:34
22.	"Summer 78"	Yann Tiersen	3:06
Total length:			80:00

== Release ==
The film attracted more than 10,000 viewers during its weekend debut. Playing in only nine theatres, the film finished sixth place during its opening weekend.

The film was shown on May 26, 2010, at the Seattle International Film Festival, on June 26 at the Frameline Film Festival, on July 9 at the Outfest Film Festival, and on July 15 at the QFest.

=== Marketing ===
The director put the film's trailer on YouTube, generating more than 400,000 views and comments which ranged from outrage to enthusiasm.

== Reception ==
=== Box office performance ===
From Beginning to End grossed $62,081 in nine theatres its opening weekend, $365,094 in second weekend, the film finished sixth place during its opening weekend. The film went on to gross $386,049 in Brazil and $14,373 in Taiwan, for a foreign total of $400,422.

=== Critical reception ===
The film received mixed reviews, some praising it for retaining a good plot while transcending boundaries and others condemning it as an ordinary plot using the subject matter to gain attention. Although unreported, the influence of Agustín Gómez-Arcos's novel L'Agneau carnivore (The Carnivorous Lamb) is patent in many dialogues and scenes..
