= 2002 in Brazilian television =

This is a list of Brazilian television related events from 2002.

== Events ==
- 29 January - The television reality show Big Brother Brasil debuts in Brazil.
- 2 April - The first season of Big Brother Brasil is won by Kléber de Paula.
- 30 June - Brazil beat Germany 2-0 to win the 2002 World Cup at Yokohama, Japan.
- 6 July - Vanessa Jackson wins the first season of FAMA.
- 23 July - Rodrigo Leonel wins the second season of Big Brother Brasil.

== Debuts ==
- 29 January - Big Brother Brasil (2002–present)
- 27 April - FAMA (2002-2005)

== Television shows ==
=== 1970s ===
- Turma da Mônica (1976–present)

=== 1990s ===
- Malhação (1995–present)
- Cocoricó (1996–present)

=== 2000s ===
- Sítio do Picapau Amarelo (2001–2007)
- Big Brother Brasil (2002–present)

== Networks and services ==
=== Launches ===
Network	Type	Launch date	Notes	Source
Band Sports	Cable television	13 May		
Combate	Cable television	9 August		
TV Justica	Cable and satellite	11 August		
Record Internacional	Cable and satellite	Unknown		

=== Conversions and rebrandings ===
Old network name	New network name	Type	Conversion Date	Notes	Source

=== Closures ===
Network	Type	Closure date	Notes	Source
The Weather Channel	Cable television	20 December		

== See also ==
- 2002 in Brazil
- List of Brazilian films of 2002
