= Lua de Cristal =

1990 film directed by Tizuka Yamasaki

- Theatrical release poster
- Directed by: Tizuka Yamasaki
- Written by: Carlos Alberto Diniz; Luís Carlos Góes; Patricia Travassos; Yoya Wursch
- Produced by: Carlos Alberto Diniz; Marco Aurélio Marcondes; Marta Passos; Diler Trindade
- Starring: Xuxa Meneghel; Sérgio Mallandro; Duda Little; Júlia Lemmertz; Marilu Bueno; Avelar Love
- Cinematography: Edgar Moura
- Edited by: Marco Antonio Cury; Ana Diniz
- Music by: Ary Sperling
- Production companies: Ponto Filmes; Art Films; Xuxa Produções
- Distributed by: Art Films; Columbia Tri Star Pictures
- Release date: June 21, 1990
- Running time: 90 minutes
- Country: Brazil
- Language: Portuguese
- Budget: $500,000
- Box office: $725,300 (U.S.)

Lua de Cristal (English: Xuxa in Crystal Moon) is a 1990 Brazilian romantic comedy film directed by Tizuka Yamasaki, and starring Xuxa Meneghel.

With just under 5 million spectators, Lua de Cristal was the biggest film of the 1990s, and it guaranteed Xuxa a second box-office hit at a time when the Brazilian film industry had all but ground to a halt.

== Cast ==
- Xuxa Meneghel as Maria da Graça
- Sérgio Mallandro as Bob
- Duda Little as Maria Eduarda (Duda)
- Avelar Love as Junior (Mauricinho)
- Júlia Lemmertz as Maria Lídia (Lidinha)
- Marilu Bueno as Zuleika
- Cláudio Mamberti as Bartô
- Rubens Correia as Prof. Uirapuru

== Reception ==
=== Criticism ===
In her critique for the Jornal do Brasil, Rogério Durst said that "in her new film, Xuxa does not convince in the role of Cinderella".

Renato Cabral, in his critique of the website Papo de Cinema, wrote: "The productions starred and produced by Xuxa Meneghel may not be the most considered of the national cinema when we look to analyze the dedication of the technique and cinematographic language. What happens, are the high numbers of viewers and the contribution to an attempt of national industry. In general, the films of the presenter always fell into the hands of directors and writers connected to television, so much of the language approached soap operas and serials, bringing a product a both superficial and poor. One of the rare moments when the queen of the little ones managed to deliver to her audience something a little better finished was certainly in Lua de Cristal.

=== Release ===
The film held the record for the highest ticket-sales for 16 years, with over 920,000 spectators going to see it in the first week alone (the record was broken by the film Two Sons of Francisco (2 filhos de Francisco) in 2006).

== See also ==
- List of Brazilian films of the 1990s
