= Explode Coração =

Brazilian telenovela by Glória Perez

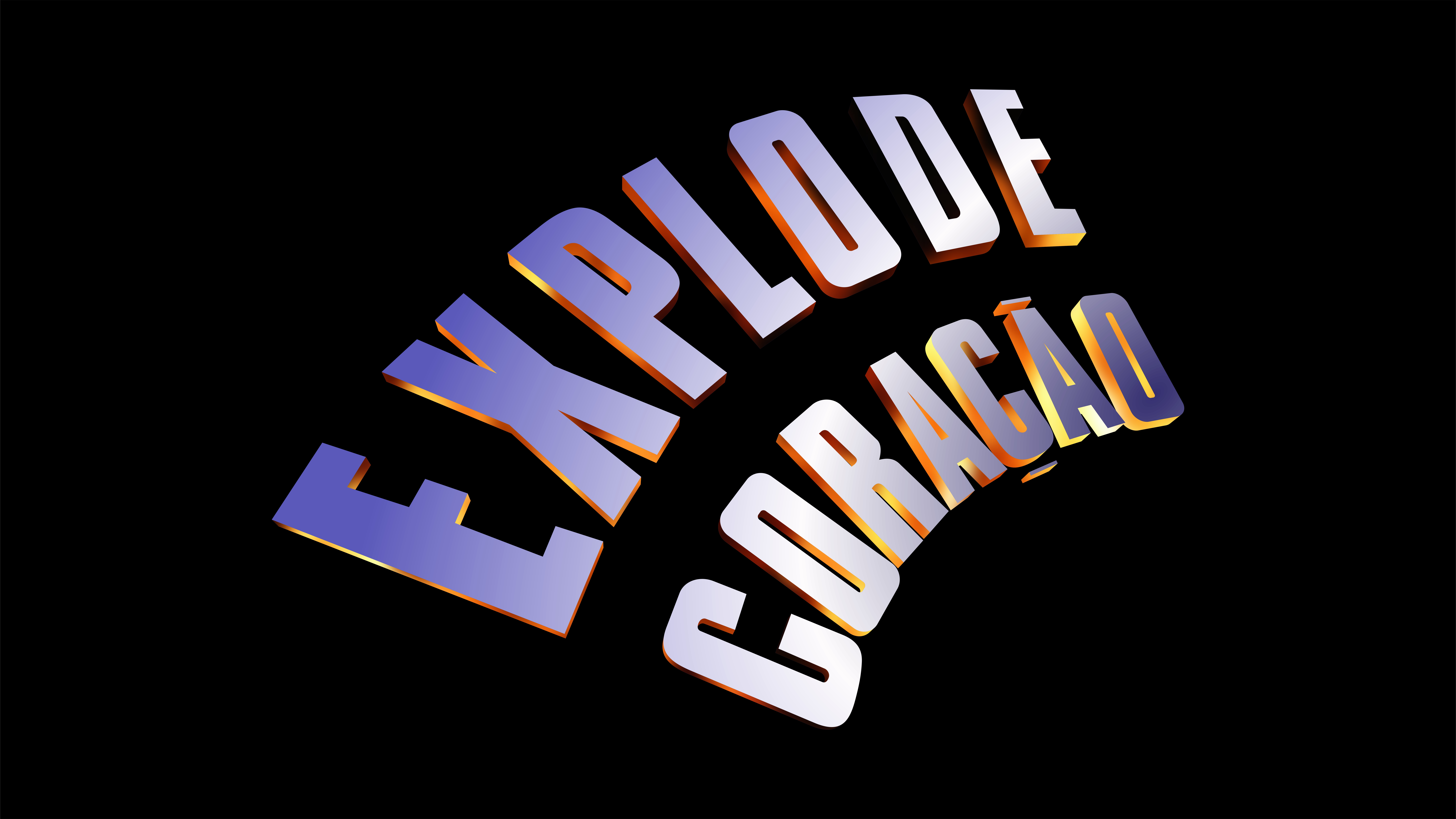
- Genre: Telenovela
- Created by: Glória Perez
- Starring: Tereza Seiblitz; Edson Celulari; Ricardo Macchi; Maria Luísa Mendonça; Françoise Forton; Paulo José; Eliane Giardini; Laura Cardoso; Stênio Garcia; Ester Góes; Leandra Leal; Rogério Cardoso; Regina Dourado; Cássio Gabus Mendes; Deborah Evelyn; Renée de Vielmond; Rodrigo Santoro
- Opening theme: "Ibiza Dance"
- Composer: Roupa Nova
- Country of origin: Brazil
- Original language: Portuguese
- No. of episodes: 155

Production
- Running time: 60 minutes
- Production company: Central Globo de Produção

Original release
- Network: Rede Globo
- Release: 6 November 1995 – 4 May 1996

Explode Coração is a Brazilian telenovela produced by Rede Globo. The series aired between 6 November 1995 and 4 May 1996, with a total of 155 episodes. It was written entirely by Glória Perez and directed by Ary Coslov, Gracie, and Carlos Araújo Júnior. Production had general direction and core Dennis Carvalho and was the 51st "Novela das Oito" (prime-time soap opera).

Edson Celulari, Tereza Seiblitz, and Ricardo Macchi play the leading roles in a plot centered around the love triangle formed by the protagonists which also addresses the gypsy culture in Brazil. Other main roles are played by Maria Luísa Mendonça, Leandra Leal, Rodrigo Santoro, Renée de Vielmond, Eliane Giardini, Paulo José, Françoise Forton, Cássio Gabus Mendes, Deborah Evelyn, Laura Cardoso, Stênio Garcia and Ester Góes.

== Synopsis ==
Dara (Tereza Seiblitz) is a young gypsy who takes pride in her cultural origins but refuses to be bound by tradition. She refuses to marry Igor (Ricardo Macchi), the groom who was chosen for her by her father Jairo (Paulo José) and mother Lola (Eliane Giardini). Her younger sister has feelings for Igor, but he only has eyes for Dara and fights for her love. Dara falls for an engaged businessman she meets online - Júlio Falcão (Edson Celulari). Julio is a man who loves money and seducing women. He lives a marriage of appearances with Vera (Maria Luísa Mendonça). Igor and Vera, as well as the traditions of the Roma people, are the greatest obstacles in the love story of Julio and Dara.

== Cast ==
- André Luiz as Marcos Avelar Falcão
- Carla Tausz as Mirtes
- Cássia Linhares as Natasha
- Cássio Gabus Mendes as Edu / Vitor Salgado
- Cláudio Cavalcanti as José Rubens Tolentino
- Daniel Dantas as Tadeu
- Débora Duarte as Marisa Carvalho Diaz
- Deborah Evelyn as Yone Sampaio
- Edson Celulari as Júlio Cezar Falcão
- Eliane Giardini as Lola Sbano
- Elias Gleizer as Augusto Lemos
- Eri Johnson as Adilson Gaivota
- Ester Góes as Luzia Nicolich
- Felipe Folgosi as Vladimir
- Floriano Peixoto as Sarita Vitti
- Françoise Forton as Eugênia Avelar
- Gracindo Júnior as Geraldo
- Guilherme Karan as Bebeto a Jato
- Helena Ranaldi as Larissa
- Herson Capri as Ivan Méndez
- Isadora Ribeiro as Odaísa
- Ivan de Albuquerque as Mio Sbano
- Jorge Cherques as Father of Salgadinho's lover
- Karina Perez as Laura
- Laura Cardoso as Soraya Nicolich
- Leandra Leal as Yanka Sbano
- Luís Cláudio Júnior as Gustavo "Gugu"
- Maria Luísa Mendonça as Vera Avelar Falcão
- Marianne Vicentini as Valéria
- Nívea Maria as Alícia Lemos
- Odilon Wagner as Leandro Avelar
- Patrick Alencar as Ricardo "Rique" Antônio Lemos
- Paula Burlamaqui as Roseneide "Rose"
- Paula Lavigne as Sônia Salgado / Soninha Contratempo
- Paulo José as Jairo
- Regina Dourado as Lucineide Salgado
- Reginaldo Faria as César Lemos
- Renée de Vielmond as Elizabeth "Beth"
- Ricardo Macchi as Igor Nicolich
- Roberta Índio do Brasil as Maria Catarina Lemos "Catty"
- Rodrigo Santoro as Serginho
- Rogério Cardoso as Romualdo Salgado "Salgadinho"
- Sônia de Paula as Hebinha
- Stella Freitas as Pattia
- Stênio Garcia as Pepe Nicolich
- Tereza Seiblitz as Dara Sbano
- Zezé Polessa as Mila Tolentino
