= List of 2009 box office number-one films in Brazil =

This is a list of films which have placed number one at the weekend box office in Brazil during 2009 (amounts are in Brazilian reais; 1 real is approximately equivalent to 0.64 US dollars).

== Number-one films ==
| † | This implies the highest-grossing movie of the year. |

| # | Date | Film | Gross | Notes |
|---|---|---|---|---|
| 1 | January 4 | Se Eu Fosse Você 2 | R$5,601,375 | Highest grossing Brazilian film in 2009, and overall since the 1995 Retomada; Most weeks at number-one in 2009. |
| 2 | January 11 | Se Eu Fosse Você 2 | R$4,459,870 | Highest grossing Brazilian film in 2009, and overall since the 1995 Retomada; Most weeks at number-one in 2009. |
| 3 | January 18 | Se Eu Fosse Você 2 | R$3,918,819 | Highest grossing Brazilian film in 2009, and overall since the 1995 Retomada; Most weeks at number-one in 2009. |
| 4 | January 25 | Se Eu Fosse Você 2 | R$3,144,331 | Highest grossing Brazilian film in 2009, and overall since the 1995 Retomada; Most weeks at number-one in 2009. |
| 5 | February 1 | Se Eu Fosse Você 2 | R$2,344,941 | Highest grossing Brazilian film in 2009, and overall since the 1995 Retomada; Most weeks at number-one in 2009. |
| 6 | February 8 | Se Eu Fosse Você 2 | R$1,700,822 | Highest grossing Brazilian film in 2009, and overall since the 1995 Retomada; Most weeks at number-one in 2009. |
| 7 | February 15 | Valkyrie | R$2,425,639 | |
| 8 | February 22 | Valkyrie | R$1,240,654 | |
| 9 | March 1 | Valkyrie | R$1,202,670 | |
| 10 | March 8 | Slumdog Millionaire | R$2,069,455 | |
| 11 | March 15 | Slumdog Millionaire | R$1,911,347 | |
| 12 | March 22 | Slumdog Millionaire | R$1,275,167 | |
| 13 | March 29 | He's Just Not That Into You | R$1,580,413 | |
| 14 | April 5 | Fast & Furious | R$4,709,873 | |
| 15 | April 12 | Fast & Furious | R$3,343,017 | |
| 16 | April 19 | Fast & Furious | R$1,769,585 | |
| 17 | April 26 | Divã | R$1,719,701 | Divã reached number-one in its second week of release. |
| 18 | May 3 | X-Men Origins: Wolverine | R$8,541,570 | |
| 19 | May 10 | X-Men Origins: Wolverine | R$4,625,830 | |
| 20 | May 17 | Angels & Demons | R$7,780,659 | |
| 21 | May 24 | Night at the Museum: Battle of the Smithsonian | R$5,277,508 | |
| 22 | May 31 | Night at the Museum: Battle of the Smithsonian | R$4,395,871 | |
| 23 | June 7 | Terminator Salvation | R$4,064,946 | |
| 24 | June 14 | A Mulher Invisível | R$2,925,000 | A Mulher Invisível reached number-one in its second week of release. |
| 25 | June 21 | A Mulher Invisível | R$1,814,922 | A Mulher Invisível reached number-one in its second week of release. |
| 26 | June 28 | Transformers: Revenge of the Fallen | R$4,076,790 | |
| 27 | July 5 | Ice Age: Dawn of the Dinosaurs | R$12,147,744 | Highest-grossing film through 2009. |
| 28 | July 12 | Ice Age: Dawn of the Dinosaurs | R$10.053.514 | Highest-grossing film through 2009. |
| 29 | July 19 | Harry Potter and the Half-Blood Prince | R$9,354,320 | |
| 30 | July 26 | Ice Age: Dawn of the Dinosaurs | R$5,331,235 | |
| 31 | August 2 | Ice Age: Dawn of the Dinosaurs | R$3,867,868 | |
| 32 | August 9 | G.I. Joe: The Rise of Cobra | R$2,005,084 | |
| 33 | August 16 | G-Force | R$2,153,306 | |
| 34 | August 23 | The Hangover | R$1,999,983 | |
| 35 | August 30 | Os Normais 2 - A Noite Mais Maluca de Todas | R$4,016,021 | |
| 36 | September 6 | Up | R$3,784,959 | |
| 37 | September 13 | Up | R$2,868,055 | |
| 38 | September 20 | Up | R$2,269,521 | |
| 39 | September 27 | Up | R$1,701,884 | |
| 40 | October 4 | Cloudy with a Chance of Meatballs | R$2,354,741 | |
| 41 | October 11 | Cloudy with a Chance of Meatballs | R$2,213,494 | |
| 42 | October 18 | Cloudy with a Chance of Meatballs | R$1,570,552 | |
| 43 | October 25 | Cloudy with a Chance of Meatballs | R$1,121,357 | |
| 44 | November 1 | Michael Jackson's This Is It | R$1,933,593 | |
| 45 | November 8 | A Christmas Carol | R$1,529,152 | |
| 46 | November 15 | 2012 | R$9,260,121 | |
| 47 | November 22 | The Twilight Saga: New Moon | R$13,191,727 | Highest weekend debut in the year. |
| 48 | November 29 | The Twilight Saga: New Moon | R$6,514,827 | |
| 49 | December 6 | The Twilight Saga: New Moon | R$4.313.169 | |
| 50 | December 13 | The Twilight Saga: New Moon | R$2.653.197 | |
| 51 | December 20 | Avatar † | R$8.416.116 | Overall highest-grossing film of the year, highest-grossing film ever in Brazil. |
| 52 | December 27 | Avatar † | R$8.500.000 | Overall highest-grossing film of the year, highest-grossing film ever in Brazil. |

== See also ==
- List of Brazilian films — Brazilian films by year
