= Querô =

2007 film directed by Carlos Cortez

- Theatrical release poster
- Directed by: Carlos Cortez
- Written by: Carlos Cortez; Plínio Marcos (novel and play)
- Produced by: Caio Gullane; Fabiano Gullane; Débora Ivanov
- Starring: Maxwell Nascimento; Leandro Carvalho; Eduardo Chagas; Milhem Cortaz; Nildo Ferreira; Maria Luísa Mendonça; Ailton Graça; Nanda Costa; Giulio Lopes
- Cinematography: Hélcio Alemão Nagamine
- Edited by: Paulo Sacramento
- Music by: André Abujamra
- Production company: Gullane Filmes
- Distributed by: Downtown Filmes
- Release date: 14 September 2007 (Brazil)
- Running time: 88 minutes
- Country: Brazil
- Language: Portuguese
- Box office: R$144,823 ($64,575)

Querô is a 2007 Brazilian drama film directed by Carlos Cortez and starring Maxwell Nascimento, Leandro Carvalho, Eduardo Chagas, Milhem Cortaz and Nildo Ferreira. The film is based on the 1976 novel Uma Reportagem Maldita - Querô by Plínio Marcos, which he subsequently adapted into a play.

== Plot ==
Querô (Maxwell) is an orphan teenage who lives from side to side, lost in the streets near the port of Santos. The son of a prostitute (Maria Luísa Mendonça), he is unaware of his father. His mother committed suicide when he was a baby taking kerosene. After being beaten by the owner of a pension (Ângela Leal), he flees. The boy starts living expediently and gets involved in petty theft. He ends up on Febem, where he explodes with all his revolt against the world.

Out of jail, Querô finds support in Gina (Claudia Juliana), which leads him to an Evangelical Church, where he falls for the pastor's niece, Lica (Alessandra Santos). However, the boy lives in a world marked by determinism, making impossible for him to escape from marginality.

== Production ==
=== Casting ===
Tests were conducted with more than 1200 kids, from 12 to 21 years, in the cities of Santos, Cubatão, Guarujá and São Vicente. Approximately 200 attended actors workshops coordinated by the preparer of actors Luiz Mário Vicente. Querô counted the participation of 40 teenagers from the region of Santos port, which integrated the Querô Workshops.
