= A Cor do Seu Destino =

1986 film by Jorge Durán

A Cor do seu Destino
- Directed by: Jorge Durán
- Screenplay by: José Joffily; Nelson Nadotti
- Produced by: Maria Da Salete; Jorge Durán; Sergio Otero
- Starring: Norma Bengell; Guilherme Fontes; Júlia Lemmertz; Andrea Beltrão
- Cinematography: José Tadeu Ribeiro
- Edited by: Dominique Pâris
- Distributed by: Embrafilme
- Release date: 13 October 1986 (Brazil)
- Running time: 104 minutes
- Country: Brazil
- Language: Portuguese

A Cor do Seu Destino is a 1986 Brazilian drama film directed by Jorge Durán and screenplay by José Joffily.

== Cast ==
- Norma Bengell - Laura
- Guilherme Fontes - Paulo
- Júlia Lemmertz - Patrícia
- Andréa Beltrão - Helena
- Chico Diaz - Vitor Filho
- Marcos Palmeira - Raul
- Antônio Ameijeiras - Cônsul
- Anderson Schreiber - Paulo (child)
- Paulinho Mosca - Setúbal
- Anderson Müller - Gordo
- Duda Monteiro - Duda
- Roberto Lee - Official

== Awards ==
1986: Festival de Brasília

1. Best Film (won)
2. Best Director (Jorge Durán) (won)
3. Best Supporting Actor (Chico Díaz) (won)
4. Best Supporting Actress (Júlia Lemmertz) (won)
5. Best Screenplay (Jorge Durán / José Joffily / Nelson Nadotti) (won)

1987: Cartagena Film Festival

1. Special Jury Award (won)
