= Marilu Bueno =

Brazilian actress (1940–2022)

- Born: Maria Luiza David Bueno de Lima; 27 February 1940; Rio de Janeiro, Brazil
- Died: 22 June 2022 (aged 82); Rio de Janeiro, Brazil
- Occupation: Actress

Maria Luiza David Bueno de Lima (known as Marilu Bueno; 27 February 1940 – 22 June 2022) was a Brazilian actress.

== Selected filmography ==
=== Television ===
- 1972 – O Bofe – Margarida (Margot)
- 1976 – Estúpido Cupido – Maria Antonieta Siqueira (Mariinha)
- 1977 – Sem Lenço, sem Documento – Gilda Duran
- 1982 – Chico Anysio Show – Pretória
- 1983 – Guerra dos Sexos – Olívia
- 1984 – Partido Alto – Sulamita Miranda
- 1985 – A Gata Comeu – Tereza (Tetê)
- 1986 – Dona Beija – Augusta
- 1988 – O Primo Basílio – Dona Felicidade de Noronha
- 1989 – República – Sofia
- 1990 – Escolinha do Professor Raimundo – Pretória
- 1992 – De Corpo e Alma – Lacy Bianchi
- 1994 – Quatro por Quatro – Calpúrnia (Tia Pupu)
- 1996 – O Fim do Mundo – Dagmar
- 1996 – Caça Talentos – Fada Margarida
- 2000 – Você Decide – Marilda
- 2002 – O Quinto dos Infernos – Violante
- 2003 – Kubanacan – Sodoma
- 2003 – Sítio do Picapau Amarelo – Dona Carochinha
- 2004 – Da Cor do Pecado – Stela
- 2006 – Bicho do Mato – Zulmira de Sá Freitas (Dinda Zuzu)
- 2008 – Chamas da Vida – Catarina Amaro da Silva
- 2012 – Guerra dos Sexos – Olívia
- 2014 – Alto Astral – Marieta Santana
- 2016 – Êta Mundo Bom! – Narcisa
- 2020 – Salve-se Quem Puder – Dulce Sampaio

=== Cinema ===
- 1960 – O Cupim
- 1989 – Better Days Ahead – Adelaide
- 1990 – Lua de Cristal – Zuleika
- 2003 – The Man of the Year
