= 2002 in Brazil =

Events from the year 2002 in Brazil

== Incumbents ==
=== Federal government ===
- President: Fernando Henrique Cardoso
- Vice President: Marco Maciel

=== Governors ===
- Acre: Jorge Viana
- Alagoas: Ronaldo Lessa
- Amapa:
  - João Capiberibe (until 1 April)
  - Dalva de Souza Figueiredo (1 April-31 December)
- Amazonas: Amazonino Mendes
- Bahia:
  - César Borges (until 5 April)
  - Otto Alencar (from 5 April)
- Ceará:
  - Tasso Jereissati (until 5 April)
  - Beni Veras (from 5 April)
- Espírito Santo: José Ignácio Ferreira
- Goiás: Marconi Perillo
- Maranhão:
  - Roseana Sarney (until 5 April)
  - José Reinaldo Tavares (from 5 April)
- Mato Grosso:
  - Dante de Oliveira (until 6 April)
  - Rogério Salles (from 6 April)
- Mato Grosso do Sul: José Orcírio Miranda dos Santos
- Minas Gerais: Itamar Franco
- Pará: Almir Gabriel
- Paraíba:
  - José Maranhão (until 6 April)
  - Roberto Paulino (6 April-31 December)
- Paraná: Jaime Lerner
- Pernambuco: Jarbas Vasconcelos
- Piauí: Hugo Napoleão
- Rio de Janeiro:
  - Anthony Garotinho (until 6 April)
  - Benedita da Silva (from 6 April)
- Rio Grande do Norte:
  - Garibaldi Alves Filho (until 6 April)
  - Fernando Antonio Chamber Freire (from 6 April)
- Rio Grande do Sul: Olívio Dutra
- Rondônia: José de Abreu Bianco
- Roraima: Neudo Ribeiro Campos (until 6 April)
  - Francisco Flamarion Portela (from 6 April)
- Santa Catarina:
  - Esperidião Amin (until 1 January)
  - Luiz Henrique da Silveira (from 1 January)
- São Paulo: Geraldo Alckmin
- Sergipe: Albano Franco
- Tocantins: José Wilson Siqueira Campos

=== Vice governors ===
- Acre: Edison Simão Cadaxo
- Alagoas: Geraldo Costa Sampaio
- Amapá:
  - Maria Dalva de Souza Figueiredo (until 5 April)
  - Vacant thereafter (from 5 April)
- Amazonas: Samuel Assayag Hanan
- Bahia:
  - Otto Alencar (until 6 April)
  - Vacant thereafter (from 6 April)
- Ceará:
  - Benedito Clayton Veras Alcântara (until 6 April)
  - Vacant thereafter (from 6 April)
- Espírito Santo: Celso José Vasconcelos
- Goiás: Alcides Rodrigues Filho
- Maranhão:
  - José Reinaldo Carneiro Tavares (until 5 April)
  - Vacant thereafter (from 5 April)
- Mato Grosso:
  - José Rogério Sales (until 5 April)
  - Vacant thereafter (from 5 April)
- Mato Grosso do Sul: Moacir Kohl
- Minas Gerais: Newton Cardoso
- Pará: Hildegardo de Figueiredo Nunes
- Paraíba:
  - Antônio Roberto de Sousa Paulino (until 5 April)
  - Vacant thereafter (from 5 April)
- Paraná: Emília de Sales Belinati
- Pernambuco: José Mendonça Bezerra Filho
- Piauí: Felipe Mendes de Oliveira
- Rio de Janeiro:
  - Benedita da Silva (until 6 April)
  - Vacant thereafter (from 5 April)
- Rio Grande do Norte:
  - Fernando Freire (until 5 April)
  - Vacant thereafter (from 5 April)
- Rio Grande do Sul: Miguel Soldatelli Rossetto
- Rondônia: Miguel de Souza
- Roraima:
  - Francisco Flamarion Portela (until 5 April)
  - Vacant thereafter (from 5 April)
- Santa Catarina: Paulo Roberto Bauer
- São Paulo: Vacant
- Sergipe: Benedito de Figueiredo
- Tocantins: João Lisboa da Cruz

== Events ==
=== January ===
- January 20: The mayor of Santo André, Celso Daniel, is found dead from at least 7 gunshots after being kidnapped in São Paulo.

=== February ===
- February 15: In a televised address, President Fernando Henrique Cardoso announces the end of electricity rationing.

=== May ===
- May 16: Colonel Mário Colares Pantoja is sentenced to 228 years in prison for the deaths of 19 landless people in the Eldorado do Carajás massacre.

=== June ===
- June 2: Tim Lopes, an investigative journalist from Rede Globo, is tortured and later murdered by drug traffickers. This happened, as Lopes was working undercover on a story in one of Rio's favelas.
- June 5: Singer Belo surrenders to the police days after having his preventive detention decreed for association with drug trafficking.
- June 30: Brazil defeats Germany 2-0, to win the 2002 FIFA World Cup. This is the fifth time Brazil wins the FIFA World Cup.

=== July ===
- July 13: : An accident on Presidente Dutra Highway, near Seropédica, kills singer Claudinho from the duo Claudinho & Buchecha.
- July 24: Francisco de Assis Pereira, also known as "The Maniac of the Park", is sentenced to over 121 years in prison for the death of five women in São Paulo.
- July 25: The Amazon Surveillance System is established in Manaus by President Fernando Henrique Cardoso.
- July 28: The program Planeta Xuxa ends after presenter Xuxa Meneghel and director Marelen Mattos end their partnership. Xuxa wanted to work again with children on the program, whereas Mattos preferred the teenage segments.

=== August ===
- August 2: The platform of presidential candidate Anthony Garotinho (PSB) collapses during a rally in Rio de Janeiro, injuring 18 people.

=== September ===
- September 25: A five-story building collapses in downtown Rio de Janeiro. Two people died and three others were injured.

=== October ===
- October 6: In the first round of the Brazilian general election, 2002, Workers' Party leader Luiz Inácio Lula da Silva fails to obtain a majority of the valid votes cast.
- October 27: In the second round of the presidential election, Lula da Silva wins 52.7 million votes (61.3% of the total).
- October 31: Engineer Manfred von Richthofen and psychiatrist Marísia von Richthofen are murdered in their sleep by brothers Daniel and Cristian Cravinhos at the behest of the couple's daughter, Suzane von Richthofen. The case became one of the most publicized and shocking crimes in Brazilian history.

=== December ===
- December 9: Heavy rainfall kills 34 people and leave over 1,500 homeless in Angra dos Reis.

== Culture ==
=== Films ===
- See List of Brazilian films of 2002

== Music ==
- Romero Lubambo - Brazilian Routes

== Births ==
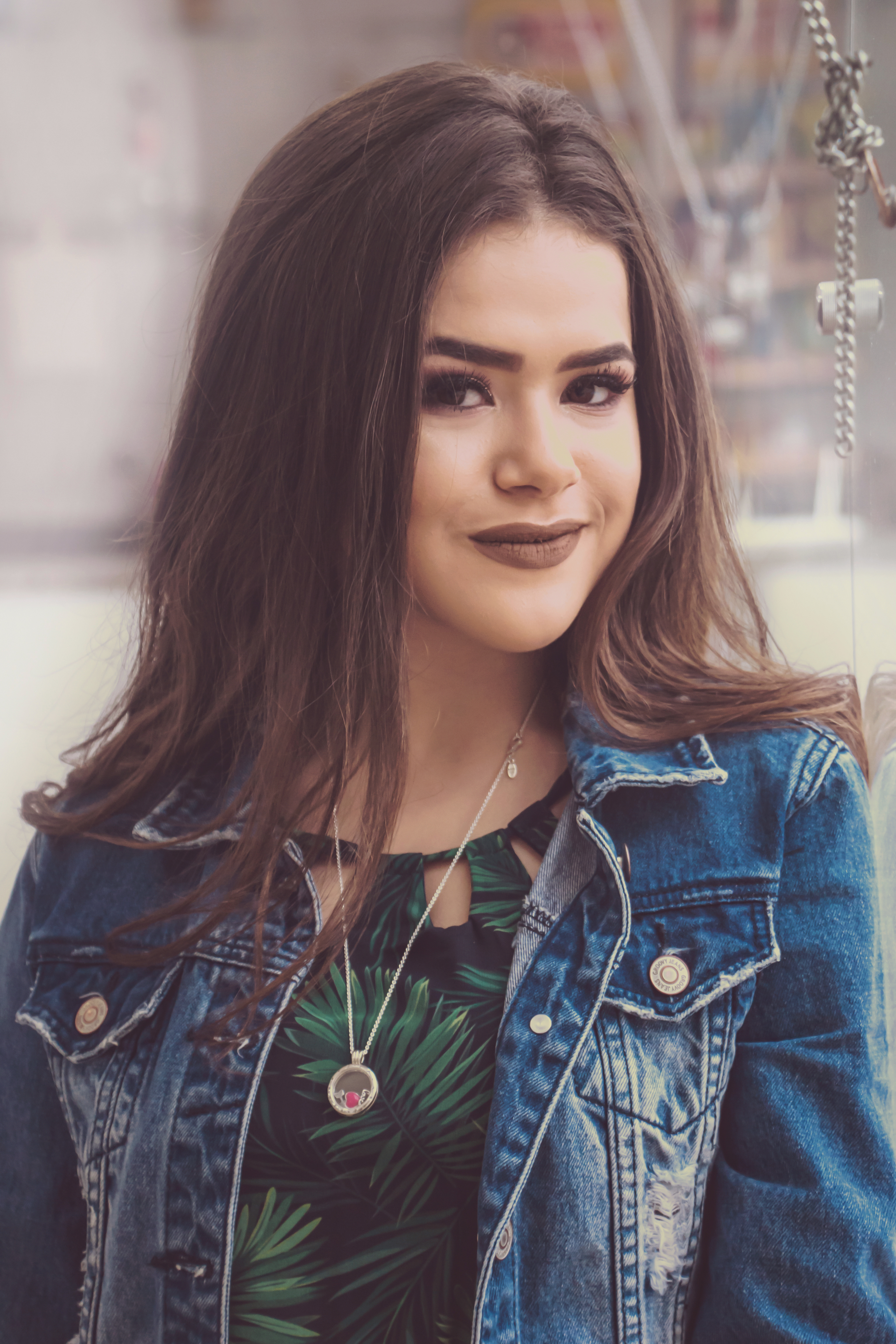
Maisa Silva in 2017

=== January ===
- January 19: Reinier Jesus, footballer

=== March ===
- March 10: Júlia Gomes, actress and singer

=== April ===
- April 8: Isabella Nardoni, murder victim (died 2008)

=== May ===
- May 3: MC Pedrinho, singer
- May 22: Maisa Silva, singer, TV hostess and actress

=== July ===
- July 13: Deborah Medrado, rhythmic gymnast
- July 24: Nicole Pircio, rhythmic gymnast

=== December ===
- December 17: Guilherme Seta, actor

== Deaths ==
=== January ===
- January 18: Celso Daniel, Brazilian politician (born 1951)
- January 19: Vavá, footballer (born 1934)

=== March ===
- March 30: Yara Bernette, classical pianist (born 1920)

=== May ===
- May 16: José Reis, scientist (born 1907)

=== June ===
- June 2: Tim Lopes, journalist (born 1950)
- June 30: Chico Xavier, philanthropist and spiritist medium (born 1910)

=== November ===
- November 21: Amílcar de Castro, sculptor (born 1920)
- November 27: Helber Rangel, film actor (born 1944)

=== December ===
- December 16: Licínio Rangel, Roman Catholic bishop (born 1936)

== See also ==
- 2002 in Brazilian football
- 2002 in Brazilian television
- List of Brazilian films of 2002
