= Giulio Lopes =

Brazilian actor (born 1959)

- Born: 1959 (age 65–66); Poá, São Paulo, Brazil
- Education: University of São Paulo
- Website: Official website (archive)

Giulio Lopes (born 1959 in Poá, São Paulo) is a Brazilian actor.

== Biography ==
Born in Poá, São Paulo, Giulio Lopes made his first exhibition as an actor in the 1982 play O Apocalipse ou o Capeta de Caruaru, by Aldomar Conrado, with the amateur theater group Caentrenós.

From then forth, the young man, that was a tradesman and started the administration course, decided to change the route of the career and study theater. In 1986, he received a scholarship in the Institute of Science and Art, and, in the next year, he was approved in the School of Theatrical Performance of the University of São Paulo.

Already in that epoch he participated in some publicist movies. However, it was only in the beginning of the 1990s that Giulio began to participate in telenovelas and miniseries of Rede Bandeirantes and Rede Globo.

Between 1990 and 1997, the actor dedicated himself to his company Capital Cenográfica, specialized in scenography. Because the job withdrew him from the stages, Lopes decided to close the business and return to his career of an actor. He recaptured his career by participating in the 2001 theater Laços Eternos, of Zibia Gasparetto. He also acted as Berrão, character of the text of Plinio Marcos Homens de Papel, and integrated in the cast of O Enigma Blavatsky, of José Rubens Siqueira.

It was during the presentations of Homens de Papel that Giulio received an invitation to participate in the feature film Contra Todos, with the screenplay and direction of Roberto Moreira. His actuation in the film gave him two prizes of best actor: in the 8th Cine PE and in the 14th FestNatal.

In 2005, he participated in other 3 films: Antônia (Tata Amaral), Querô (Carlos Cortez), and Os Doze Trabalhos (Ricardo Elias), with casting forecast to 2006.

In 2008, he participated in the film Meu Nome Não É Johnny (father of Estrella).

== Telenovelas ==
- Amor de Mãe
- Desejo Proibido
- Tempo Final
- Malhação
- A Grande Família
- Cristal – Régis
- Sandy & Junior
- Da Cor do Pecado
- Um Anjo Caiu do Céu
- Vila Madalena
- Por Amor
- Torre de Babel
- Andando nas Nuvens
- Suave Veneno – Waldecir

== Films ==
- 2002 – Viver no Carnaval
- 2003 – Contra Todos – Teodoro
- 2007 – Casa em Ruínas
- 2007 – Duas Opções
- 2007 – Não Por Acaso
- 2007 – Querô – Delegado
- 2007 – Os Doze Trabalhos – Officer
- 2007 – Antônia – Antenor
- 2008 – Verônica
- 2008 – Meu Nome Não É Johnny
- 2008 – A Encarnação do Demônio

== Theater ==
- 1982 – O Apocalipse ou o Capeta de Caruaru
- 2001 – Laços Eternos
- 2002 – Homens de Papel
- 2003 – O Enigma Blavatsky
- 2007 – O Inimigo do Povo
