= Elisa Lucinda =

Brazilian actress, singer, poet, writer, and journalist

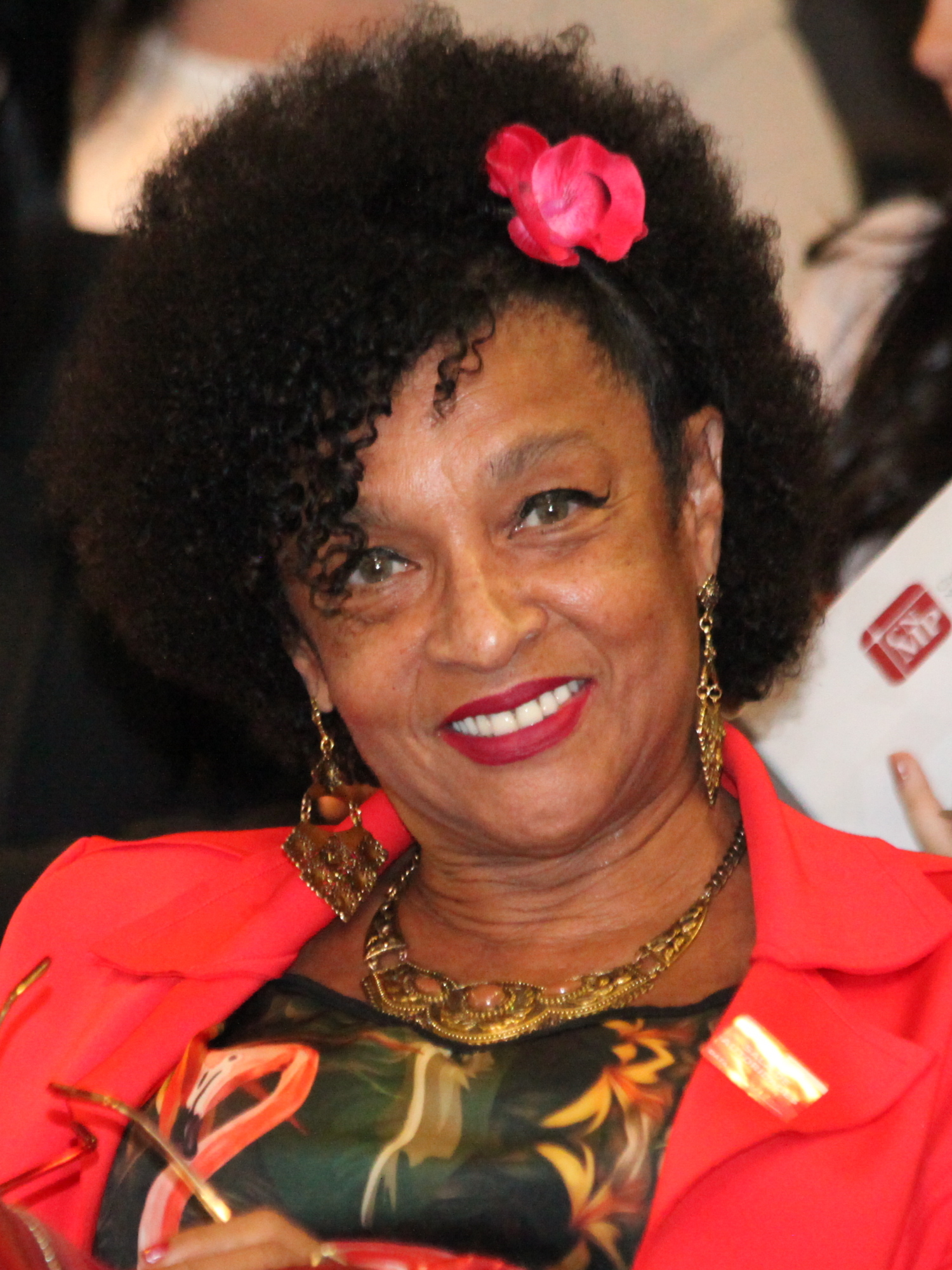
- Elisa Lucinda in 2018
- Born: Elisa Lucinda dos Campos Gomes; February 2, 1958 (age 68); Cariacica, Brazil
- Occupations: Actress, singer, poet, writer and journalist
- Years active: 1989–present

Elisa Lucinda (born February 2, 1958) is a Brazilian actress, singer, poet, writer and journalist. Born in Cariacica, Espírito Santo, she studied poetry between the age of 11 and 17. Lucinda attended journalism school at Vitória, when she worked writing for newspapers and in a news program. Lucinda was 27 when she decided to move to Rio de Janeiro to become an actress; however, her poetry was more successful. After selling poems and hand-written books, she attracted attention from stage and television directors, debuting on Rede Manchete's telenovela Kananga do Japão in 1989.

== Work ==
Lucinda's poems involve themes of love, pain, passion, frustration, birth, death. Her poetry also deals with themes of racism, sexism, and mistreatment of the poor.

== Selected filmography ==
- Kananga do Japão (1989)
- Que sera, sera (2002)
- Mulheres Apaixonadas (2003)
- Páginas da Vida (2006)
- The Last Stop (2012)
- Manhãs de Setembro (2021)
- Vai na Fé (2023)
- Coração Acelerado (2026)
