= Agustín Gómez-Arcos =

Spanish writer (1939–1998)

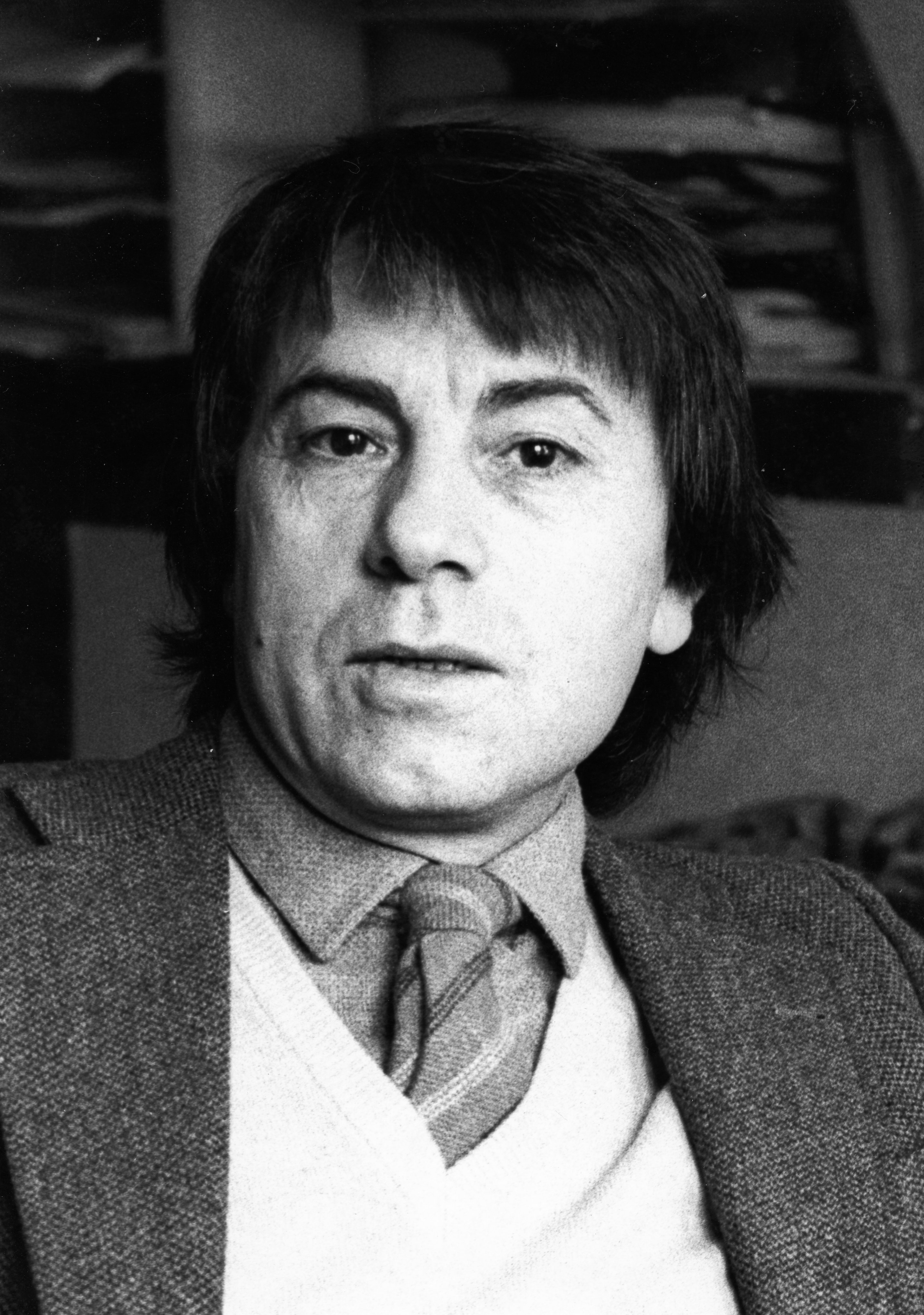
- Agustín Gómez-Arcos in Paris
- Born: 15 January 1933; Enix, Almería, Andalucía, Spain
- Died: 20 March 1998 (aged 65); París, France
- Occupation: Writer
- Writing career
- Genres: Novel, theater and poetry
- Notable awards: Inter Book Prize

Agustin Gomez-Arcos (15 January 1933 – 20 March 1998) was a Spanish writer. He was born in Enix, Spain. He studied law but quit university for theater. However, some of his work was banned in Franco's Spain. He emigrated to London in 1966, then to Paris in 1968 and wrote primarily in French, often with themes condemning the Francoist State. He died in Paris of cancer.

In his early years in Spain he wrote a number of plays, notable for their bizarre themes and highly innovative and non-realistic theatrical technique (see S.G. Feldman's study, referenced below). After emigrating to France he wrote many novels, all in French and listed below. Half of them are bitter attacks on Francoist Spain. These won him a considerable French readership (François Mitterrand was a particular admirer), but were unpopular, indeed largely ignored, in Spain, where the attempt was being made to get beyond the fierce antagonism generated by the Spanish Civil War by forgetting about it. The most successful of these novels was 'Ana Non', which is less polemical and concentrates on the grief and bereavement of a widow who has lost her husband and sons in the civil war; it tells of her slow, sad journey through a Spain alien to her on her way to see her one surviving son, imprisoned for life, whom she finds dead on her arrival at his prison. In the English-speaking world more attention was paid to his first novel, The Carnivorous Lamb, which gives a highly sympathetic account of a passionate sexual relationship between two brothers; this is the most extreme example of the writer's anarchistic antinomianism.

== Novels ==
- L'Agneau carnivore, 1975; won the 1975 Hermès Prize. (Translated from the original French by William Rodarmor as The Carnivorous Lamb for David Godine, Boston in 1984; reprinted in 2007 by Arsenal Press, Vancouver.)
- Maria Republica, 1976
- Ana non, 1977; won the 1977 Livre Inter prize, the 1978 Roland Dorgelès Prize and the Thyde Monnier Prize
- Scène de chasse (furtive), 1978
- Pré-papa ou Roman de fées, 1979
- L'enfant miraculée, 1981
- L'enfant pain, 1983
- Un oiseau brûlé vif, 1984 (A Bird Burned Alive, 1988)
- Bestiaire, 1986
- L'homme à genoux, 1989
- L'aveuglon, 1990
- Mère Justice, 1992
- La femme d'emprunt, 1993
- L'ange de chair, 1995
