= Mounir Maasri =

- Born: 23 April 1940 (age 86); Aley, Lebanon
- Occupations: Actor, Writer, Director, and Performing Arts Teacher
- Years active: 1962–present

Mounir Rachid Maasri (born. Aley, Lebanon; April 23, 1940) (Arabic: منير رشيد معاصري), born to Rachid Maasri and Shafiqa Haddad, is a Scottish- British actor, director, writer, and teacher for the Performing Arts. Maasri completed his early education in Lebanon, and travelled to the United States at a young age to continue his studies in the field of Performing Arts.

== Education ==
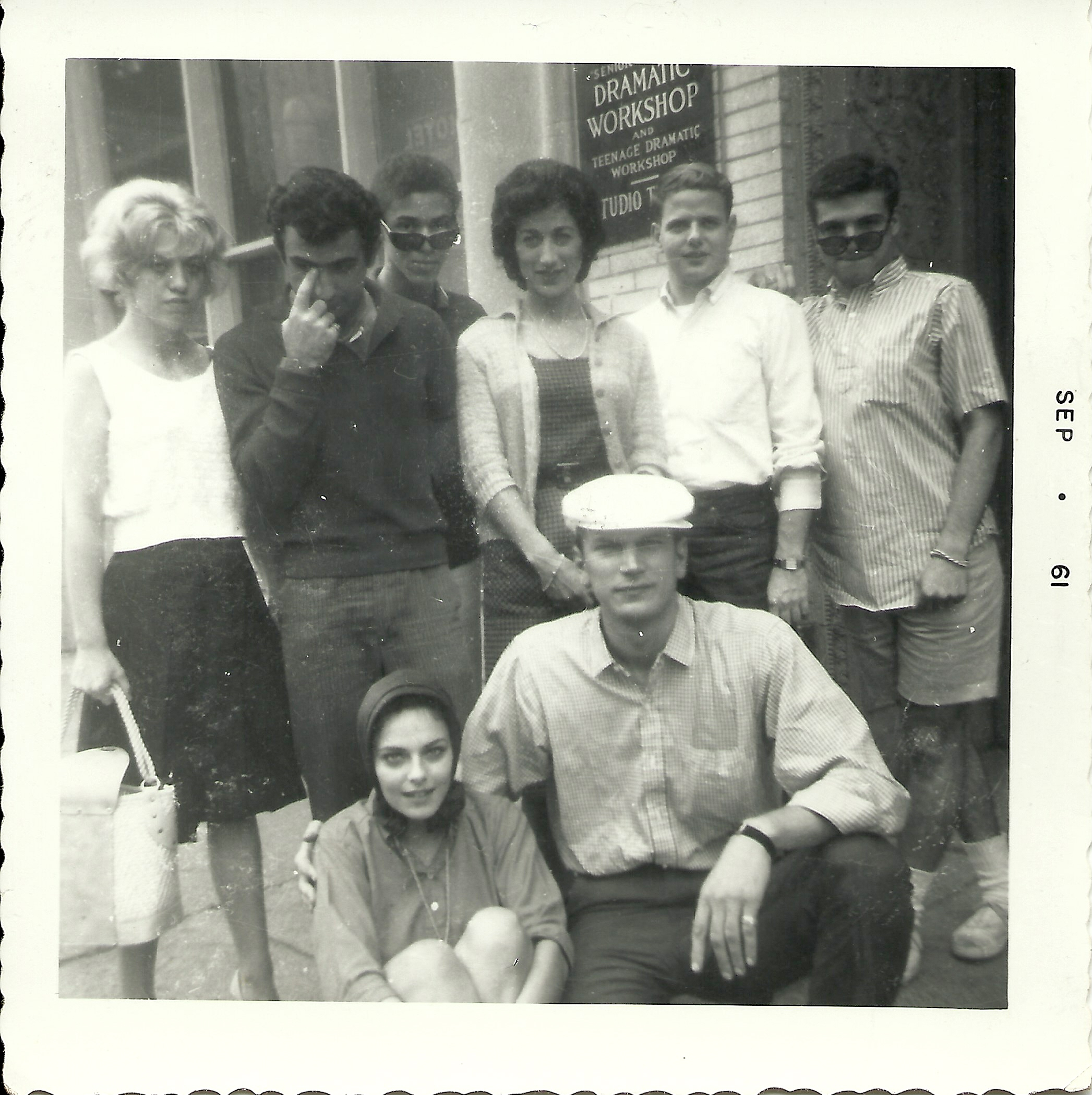
Mounir Maasri (second from left) in front of the Senior Dramatic Workshop in New York

From 1960 to 1962, Mounir Maasri studied under Lee Strasberg – one of the most famous teachers at the Actors Studio – at the Senior Dramatic Workshop in New York. In 1961, he was asked to start teaching other students himself, in addition to holding the leading role in several productions, including Julius Caesar, Othello, and A Streetcar Named Desire, among others.

== Film ==
Upon his return to Lebanon in 1962, Maasri began a prolific career – that was halted briefly due to the beginning of the Lebanese Civil War. In this initial phase of his career, the period of 1962 to 1975, he worked not only as an actor, producer, writer and director – often in two or more of these positions for a single production – but at times also as a dancer, production manager, make up consultant, lighting designer and director, in feature films, television and theatre. His participation was not limited to productions in Lebanon, but also included joint Lebanese-American, French and British projects. Works particularly worth mentioning are his leading roles in feature films Garo and The Mute and Love, for which he was later recognized with a Best Actor Award from the Lebanese Film Academy in 1967 and 1968 respectively, and a leading role in the Arabic-language version of Mohamad: The Messenger of God, during the filming of which he met and befriended late actor Anthony Quinn, as well as Irene Pappas.

== Theater ==
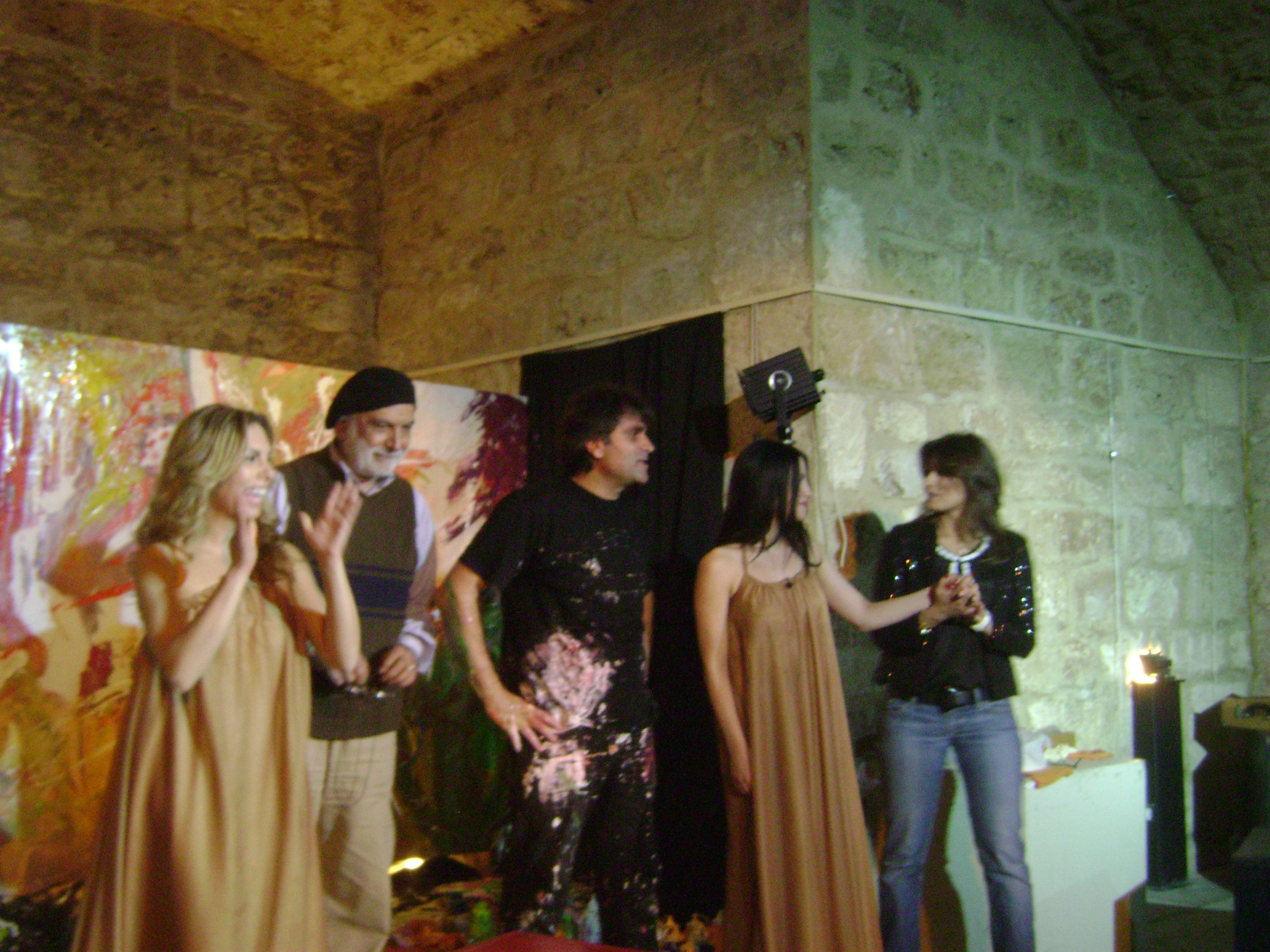
Maasri (second from left) with (L-R) Nagham Abou Chedid, Rudy Rahme, Carla Dib and Patricia Elias after the performance of "Infinite Desire" on 15 April 2010, in Beirut

Starting in 1977, Maasri resumed his cultural activities, branching out as Lebanese Folk Dance teacher at the American Lebanese Cultural Organization in Los Angeles. In the following three decades, he continued to work as a writer, actor, producer and director, as well as undertaking other projects such as being tasked as lighting designer and director for several recitals by Majida al-Roumi (herself a recipient of an Honorary Doctorate from AUB), both in Lebanon and abroad – in events such as the Jarash International Art Festival in Jordan, the International Carthage Art Festival in Tunisia, the Baghdad International Festival in Iraq, and al-Roumi's USA Tour in 1990 which included a performance at Carnegie Hall in New York. Maasri took part in several international festivals with both his films and his plays. Such festivals include, but are not limited to, the Moscow Film Festival in the former USSR; the Carthage Film Festival in Tunisia; The East Meets the West in Rome; the 10`eme Rencontres Internationales -Films et Jeunesse, in Cannes; and the Baghdad Theater Festival, in Iraq. His awards, in addition to those aforementioned for Garo and The Mute and Love, include Best Film for The Mute and Love at Tashkent Film Festival (USSR) in 1968, Best Short Film for The Oriental Dance at the Tashkent Film Festival in 1971, and Best Play for The Dream Maker at the Carthage Theater Festival in Tunisia in 1985. Maasri has participated in local and international festivals and seminars in other capacities: he was the artistic director for Anjar International Art Festival in Anjar, Lebanon, jury president at the Cannes Junior Film Festival in Beirut and artistic director of the ceremony in Byblos that marked the launch of the International Year of the Culture of Peace in 2000; abroad, he reprised his role as a teacher at the Performing Arts Dance Seminar in Brasília, Brazil, several times, and most recently, was an honorary guest and jury member at the 3rd International Urban Film Festival in Tehran.

== Performing Arts Teacher ==
Perhaps one of the biggest roles he has ever played – and continues to do so – is his role as a teacher. Maasri has taught at several different Lebanese universities, such as the American University of Beirut (Off-Campus Program), ALBA, Notre-Dame, Saint-Esprit de Kaslik, and Balamand, as well as Dulcina College for the Performing Arts in Brasília, Brazil. He worked as an acting coach on Brazilian feature film Baile Perfumado (winner of 18 international awards). Since 1998, he has been Dean of the Performing Arts School at the Institute Libano-European of Technology, as well the sole instructor of an intensive, multi-faceted program which trains and teaches students in the four interlinked disciplines of acting, directing, writing and producing for cinema and television. Many of his former students, who have nothing but praise for him (and in true technological generation fashion have set up a group on the social networking site Facebook, which currently has over 100 members), have pursued successful budding careers of their own in Lebanon, the Persian Gulf, Saudi Arabia, Belgium and France, among other places. He also developed a program for teaching the audiovisual arts to children with special needs, and is backed by a diploma in Parental Guidance: The Development of the Human Potential from The Institutes for the Achievement of Human Potential, Philadelphia – USA. He initially implemented the program at the Institute Libano-European of Technology but was unfortunately unable to continue due to lack of funding.

== Festivals ==
=== Film Festivals ===
- The Oriental Dance: Tashkent Film Festival - USSR
- The Mute And Love: Carthage Film Festival - Tunis, Tashkent Film Festival - USSR
- Destiny: Carthage Theater Festival - Tunis, Moscow Film Festival - USSR, The East Meets The West - Rome, Italy, 10`Eme Rencontres Internationales - Films et Jeunesse Cannes, France

=== Theater Festivals ===
´The Dream Maker: Carthage Film Festival - Tunis, Tunisia, Baghdad Theater Festival, Iraq

== Written Scripts ==
=== Arabic Language ===
- The Inspector
- The Dove Prisoner
- Destiny
- Ricky and Rabih
- Hymn of Life
- Blood Wedding
- The Finger
- Tell Us of Freedom

=== English language ===
- The Old Man and the Mountain
- The Question
- Bar of Angels
- Tell Us of Pain
- Favela

=== Portuguese language ===
- Favela

== Awards ==
- Lifetime Achievement Award, Teleliban 2007

For other awards see the filmography list.

== Filmography and Theatre ==
Feature films and Theatre

Year	Film	Theatre	Role	Notes	Awards
2012	The Last Stop		Tarik		
2010		"Infinite Desire" (Desir d'Infini)	Director		
2009	“ Huvelin …” (Stairs of the Resistance)		Director – Writer – Producer		
2008	"Charbel" (Saint from Lebanon)		Writer		
2004	"Our Father on Earth"		Writer, Producer, Director, Actor	Lebanon	
1998		"Charbel"	Leading Actor/Executive Producer	Albert Theater, Lebanon	
1994		"I went my way"	Writer – Director – Producer	Musical Theater Play at Piccadilly Theater – Beirut, Lebanon	
1990		Majda Al-Roumi Recital	Lighting Designer and Director	International Art Festival Carthage – Tunis	
1990		Majda Al-Roumi Recital	Lighting Designer and Director	International Art Festival Carthage – USATour; David Symphony Hall – San Francisco; Carnagie Hall – New York	
1989		Majda Al-Roumi Recital	Lighting Designer and Director	Casino du Liban Theater – Lebanon	
1988		Majda Al-Roumi Recital	Lighting Designer and Director	Jarash International Festival – Jordan	
1988		Majda Al-Roumi Recital	Lighting Designer and Director	Casino du Liban Theater – Lebanon	
1987		Majda Al-Roumi Recital	Lighting Designer and Director	Casino du Liban Theater – Lebanon	
1987		"What About Tomorrow"	Producer and Director	Odeon Theater – Lebanon	
1986		Majda Al-Roumi Recital	Lighting Designer and Director	Jarash International Festival – Jordan; Baghdad Art Festival – Iraq; Carthage International Art Festival – Tunisia; Damascus Art Festival – Syria	
1986	"Ricky and Rabih"		Writer, Director, Producer and Actor	TV Mini Series – Lebanon	
1985		"The Dream Maker"	Producer and Leading Role	Casino du Liban Theater – Lebanon	Best Play Carthage Theater Festival Tunis, Tunisia
1984		Majda Al-Roumi Recital	Lighting Designer and Director	International Carthage Art Festival – Tunisia	
1982		Majda Al-Roumi Recital	Lighting Designer and Director	Jarash International Art Festival – Jordan	
1982	"The Three Hostages"		Actor, Leading Role	TV Mini Series – Lebanon	
1981		Majda Al-Roumi Recital	Lighting Designer and Director	George V Theater – Lebanon	
1980		"The Koundlaft Goes to Heaven"	Actor – Leading Role	Sit-In Theater – Lebanon	
1979	"Aggression and Resistance"		Writer and Director	Short film for cinema and TV – Lebanon	
1978		"St. Charbel"	Writer and Director	Casino du Liban Theater – Lebanon	
1974	"Mohamad the Message of God"		Actor – one of the leading roles	Epic Feature Film – American/British/Arab Production Marocco and Libya	
1974	"Foot Steps On the Sand"		Actor – Leading Role	TV Mini Series – Lebanon	
1973	"The Uncertain Tune"		Actor – Leading Role	TV Mini Series – Lebanon	
1973		"Cabaret"	Actor – Leading Role	Baalbeck Theater – Lebanon	
1972	Leading Role: "Destiny"		Writer, Producer and Actor	Feature Film – Lebanon	
1972		"Under the Patronage of Zakkour"	Actor, Leading Role	Baalbeck Theater – Lebanon	
1972		"The Wings of Love"	Lighting Designer and Director	Byblos International Art Festival – Lebanon	
1971	"The Oriental Dance”		Writer, Producer and Director	Short Film for Cinema – Lebanon	Best Short Film Tashkent Film Festival – USSR
1971		"Let Desdemona Die"	Actor – Leading role	Theater – Lebanon	
1971		"Man … Letter … Road"	Writer and Director	Theater – Lebanon	
1970		"Danton' s Death”	Actor – Leading Role	Theater Play – Lebanon	
1970		"Why?"	Actor – Leading Role	Theater – Lebanon	
1970		"Their Fault is they Are Innocent"	Actor – Leading Role	Theater – Lebanon	
1969		"Carte Blanche"	Actor – Leading Role	Phoenicia Theater – Lebanon	
1969		: "Hamlet"	Actor and Make-up	Baalbeck Theater Festival – Lebanon	
1969		"The Wings of Love"	Lighting Designer and Director	Jbeil International Art Festival – Lebanon"	
1968		"The Exception and the Rule"	Actor – Leading Role	West Hall Theater – Lebanon	
1968	"Once Upon a Time"	Actor – Leading Role	TV Mini Series – Lebanon		
1967	“A Farewell to Lebanon"		Actor – Leading Role	Feature Film – American/Lebanese co-production – Lebanon	
1967	"The Secrets of the Red Sea"		Actor – one of the leading roles	TV Mini Series – O.R.T.F. (French New Work Production)	
1966	"The Mute and Love"		Actor – Leading Role	Feature Film – Lebanon	Lebanese Film Academy Award as Best Actor; Best Film Award Tashkent Film Festival – USSR
1966	"I Confess"		Actor – Leading Role	TV Feature Film – Lebanon	
1965	"The Milionares"		Actor – Leading Role	Feature Film – Lebanon	
1965		"Independence Day"	Director	Theater Play – Lebanon	
1964	"Garo"		Actor – Leading Role	Feature Film – Lebanon	Lebanese Film Academy Award as Best Actor
1964	"Interpol Beirut"		Actor – Leading role	TV Mini Series – Lebanon	
1963		"The Bridge of the Moon"	Dancer and Actor	Operette-Baalbeck International Art Festival – Lebanon	
1963		"Macbeth"	Actor, Production Manager and Make-up	Theater Play – Lebanon	
1962		"The Nativity of Jesus Christ"	Writer, Producer and Director	Theater – Lebanon	
1961		"Lady of the Laxpur Lotion", "Pic-Nic", "25C White Cap", "Orphoeus Descending", "Street Car Named Desire"	Actor – Leading Role:	Senior Dramatic Workshop – New York	
1960		"Julius Caesar", "Othello", " Return to Kansas City"	Actor – Leading Role	Senior Dramatic Workshop – New York	
