= Beatriz Seigner =

Brazilian film director

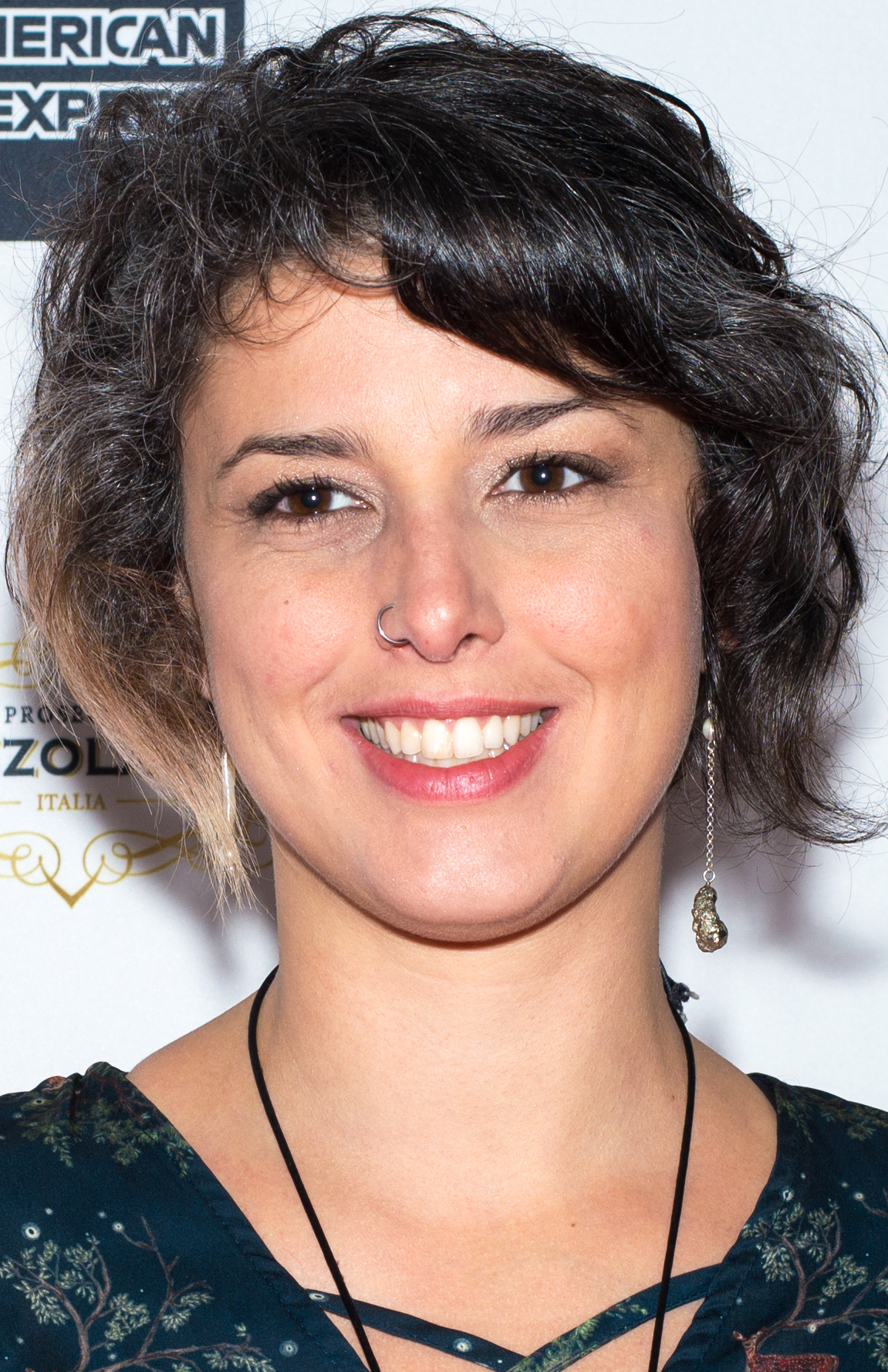
- Born: São Paulo
- Occupation: film director

Beatriz Seigner is a Brazilian film director and screenwriter.

== Biography ==
Seigner was born in São Paulo. Her first films were shorts Uma Menina Como Outras Mil (2001), Roda Real (2004), and Índias (2005).

Her debut feature Bollywood Dream (2010) became the first ever Indian-Brazilian film co-production. It was screened at numerous international film festivals and well received at the São Paulo Film Festival.

Her second feature, Los silencios, premiered in the Directors’ Fortnight of the Cannes Film Festival and received favourable reviews. The film won the Stockholm Film Festival's Impact Award, the Audience Award at FESCAAL 2019, etc. At the 20th Havana Film Festival New York, protagonist Marleyda Soto was awarded the Havana Star Prize for Best Actress for her role in the film.

Her next project was a documentary titled Between Us, A Secret (2020) about the Djelis of Mali.

She co-wrote the screenplay for Walter Salles's new film La contadora de películas and was the jury member of the FESCAAL 2021.

At the Series Mania 2023 her upcoming project Amigas won the third prize and a development grant of the Seriesmakers section.

== Filmography ==
- Bollywood Dream (2010);
- Los silencios (2018);
- Between Us, A Secret (2020) documentary.
