= List of Brazilian films of the 1940s =

An incomplete list of films produced in Brazil in the 1940s. For an alphabetical list of films currently on Wikipedia see Category:Brazilian films

Title	Director	Cast	Genre	Notes
1940
Argila	Humberto Mauro	Carmen Santos, Celso Guimarães, Lídia Mattos, Floriano Faissal, Saint Clair Lopes	Romantic drama	
Direito de Pecar	Martin Leo	Jo Guarana, Dilo Guardia, Sergio Maia		
Laranja-da-China	Ruy Costa	Barboza Junior, Nair Alves, Dircinha Batista	Comedy	
Eterna Esperança	Leo Marten	Carlos Barbosa, Maria Belmar, Milton Braga Junior	Drama	
Fantasia				
Pureza				
1941
Barulho na Universidade				
24 Horas de Sonho				
A Sedução do Garimpo				
O Dia é Nosso				
Vamos Cantar				

Title	Director	Cast	Genre	Notes
1942
Astros em Desfile				
Saludos Amigos				
1943
Caminho do Céu				
Samba in Berlin	Luiz de Barros	Mesquitinha, Laura Suarez	Musical comedy	
1944
Abacaxi azul				
O Brasileiro João de Souza				
Berlin to the Samba Beat				
Corações Sem Piloto				
É Proibido Sonhar				
Romance Proibido				
1945
O Cortiço				
O Gol da Vitória				
Não Adianta Chorar				
Pif-Paf				
The Three Caballeros				
1946
Caídos do Céu	Luiz de Barros			
O Ébrio				
1947
The End of the River				British
Asas do Brasil				
1948
Esta é Fina				
Fogo na Canjica				
Mãe				
Poeira de Estrelas				
1949
Almas Adversas				
Estou Aí				
A Escrava Isaura				
O Homem que Passa				
Inocência				
Pinguinho de Gente				
Vendaval Maravilhoso				
