= Luiza Mariani =

Brazilian actress and producer (born 1980)

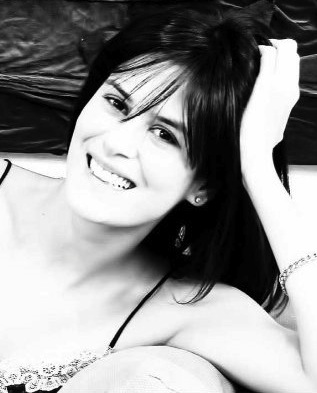
- Born: Luiza Mariani; August 19, 1980 (age 45); Rio de Janeiro, RJ
- Occupations: Actress and producer

Luiza Mariani is a Brazilian actress and producer. She started her career on the theater when she was 14 years old, and when she was 15 she was chosen by Domingos Oliveira to be part of the cast of the play “Confissões de Adolescente”. Studied philosophy at the PUC - RJ. Her latest film, Cyclone, had its world premiere at the 27th edition of the Shanghai International Film Festival, in june 2025.

== Career ==
In 1997, she studied in the Actors Workshop of TV Globo, and in 1998 she was part of the fixed casting of “Malhação”. In 1999, she moved out to New York, where she remained for two years studying theater at Lee Strasberg, and cinema at New York Film Academy. In 2001, she came back to Brazil and had her first performance in a movie in “As Três Marias” by Aluízio Abranches as the character Maria Pia. Also in 2001, she produced and acted in the play “Polaróides Explícitas” by Mark Ravenhill, directed by Ary Coslov. In 2002, she acted in a soap opera on TV Globo “Desejos de Mulher”, by Euclydes Marinho and was invited by Domingos Oliveira to perform in the play “Os Melhores Anos de Nossas Vidas”. In 2003, she shot “Nina”, a feature film by the director Heitor Dhalia, and “O Sarcófago Macabro”, by Ivan Cardoso. In 2004, she was part of the protagonist casting of the feature film “O Passageiro”, by Flavio Tambellini.

In 2005, she acted in two episodes of the TV series “Mandrake”, produced by Conspiração Filmes for HBO, respectively directed by José Henrique Fonseca and Cláudio Torres. Also in 2005, she acted in the miniseries “JK”, by Maria Adelaide Amaral, as the character Idalina Lemos.

From August 2006 to June 2007 she produced and acted in the play “O Perfeito Cozinheiro das Almas desse Mundo” by Oswald de Andrade, in Rio de Janeiro and São Paulo, directed by Jefferson Miranda. Also in 2006 she acted in the soap opera of TV Globo “Cobras e Lagartos”, by João Emanuel Carneiro. In October 2007, invited by the director Antunes Filho, she moved out to São Paulo to be part of Centro de Pesquisa Teatral (the Theatrical Research Center), where she stayed until April 2008.

In November 2007, she shot “Se Nada Mais Der Certo”, a feature film by José Eduardo Belmonte, as the character Ângela. In 2009 she debuted in Rio de Janeiro the "Projeto 21", a collective process by Cia do Autônomo, directed by Jefferson Miranda. In 2010, she acted in the play “Aquelas Mulheres” by Neil Labute, directed by Flavio Tambellini in Rio de Janeiro. Also in 2010 she debuted as a TV presenter beside Marcelo D2 in the talk show “Estilo Brasil”, for Fashion TV. She shot the series “Amorais” for Canal Brasil, as the character Clara, and the feature film “Eu Mereço”, both directed by Fernando Ceyllão, and she acted in a TV series of TV Globo “A Cura”, by Joao Emanuel Carneiro, as the character Lucinha. In 2011 she was part of the TV series “Aline” of TV Globo, directed by Mauricio Farias. Also in 2011 she produced and performed the play “Você Precisa Saber de Mim ”, by Pedro Bricio, Rodrigo Nogueira and Jô Bilac, directed by Jefferson Miranda.

In December 2011 she shot “O Gorila”, a feature film by José Eduardo Belmonte, as the character Luci. In 2013, she acted in “As Canalhas”, a TV series directed by Anna Muylaert, for GNT. In 2014, she was part of the feature films “Um Homem só”, by Claudia Jouvin and “Como Você Quer Seu Casamento”, by Aluizio Abranches. In 2015, she shot the feature film “O Grande Circo Místico”, by Cacá Diegues, as the character Lily Braun. Nowadays, she is part of the protagonist casting of the TV series “Questão de Familia”, also on GNT, directed by Sérgio Rezende.

== Filmography ==
=== Works on television ===
Year	Title	Character
1998	Malhação	Isadora (Isa) (1999-1998)
2002	Desejos de Mulher	Xana
2005	Mandrake	Nininha Paranhos
2006	JK	Idalina Lemos Vasconcelos
2006	Cobras & Lagartos	Júlia Pacheco
2011	A Cura	Lucinha
2011	Estilo Brasil	Presenter
2013	Amor à Vida	Sibila
2013	As Canalhas	Roberta
2015	Questão de Família	Ana Paula
2016	Detetives do Prédio Azul	Bruxa Sibila

=== Movies ===
Ano	Título	Papel
2001	Amores Possíveis	Dandara
2001	As Três Marias	Maria Pia
2003	Nina	Alice
2005	O Passageiro - Segredos de Adulto	Cristina
2007	Se Nada Mais Der Certo	Ângela
2010	Eu Mereço	Clara
2012	O Gorila	Luci
2014	Como Você Quer Seu Casamento?	Bruninha
2015	Um Homem Só	Suzana
2018	O Grande Circo Místico	Lily Braun
2018	Todas as Canções de Amor	Clarisse

== Theater ==
- 1994 – “A Quarta Companhia” by Desmar Cardoso, directed by Desmar Cardoso.
- 1996 - “Confissões de Adolescente” by Maria Mariana, directed by Domingos Oliveira.
- 2002 – “Polaróides Explícitas” by Mark Ravenhill, directed by Ary Coslov.
- 2004 – “Os Melhores Anos de Nossas Vidas”, by Domingos Oliveira, directed by Domingos Oliveira.
- 2007 – “O Perfeito Cozinheiro das Almas Deste Mundo”, by Oswald de Andrade, directed by Jefferson Miranda.
- 2009 – “ Projeto 21“, by Jefferson Miranda, directed by Jefferson Miranda.
- 2010 – “Aquelas Mulheres” by Neil Labute, directed by Flávio Ramos Tambellini.
- 2011 – “Você Precisa Saber de Mim”, by Pedro Bricio, Jô Bilac, Rodrigo Nogueira, directed by Jefferson Miranda.
- 2013 – “Sobre Uma Mulher Que Só Vi Uma Vez Na Vida”, by Jô Bilac, directed by Jefferson Miranda.
