= A Pelada =

2013 film directed by Damien Chemin

- Theatrical release poster
- Directed by: Damien Chemin
- Written by: Damien Chemin; Paulo Lobo
- Starring: Kika Farias; Bruno Pêgo; Tuca Andrada; Karen Junqueira
- Music by: Dudu Prudente
- Distributed by: Tarantula (Belgium); Downtown Filmes (Brazil)
- Release date: 26 June 2013 (Belgium)
- Running time: 82 minutes
- Countries: Belgium; Brazil
- Language: Portuguese

A Pelada is a 2013 Belgium-Brazilian comedy film written and directed by Damien Chemin.

== Plot ==
The film follows the story of a young couple, Caio and Sandra, who find it necessary to go through new experiences to revive the passion of the wedding, after their first serious crisis.

== Cast ==
- Kika Farias
- Bruno Pêgo
- Tuca Andrada
- Karen Junqueira

== Production ==
In November 2011, Chemin started to cast the actors, and principal photography took place in January and February 2012 in Aracaju. Post-production was done in Belgium, lasting until early 2013.
