= A Glass of Rage =

1999 film directed by Aluizio Abranches

- Theatrical release poster
- Directed by: Aluizio Abranches
- Written by: Aluízio Abranches; Flávio Tambellini
- Based on: Um Copo de Cólera by Raduan Nassar
- Produced by: Flávio R. Tambellini
- Starring: Alexandre Borges; Julia Lemmertz
- Cinematography: Pedro Farkas
- Edited by: Idê Lacreta
- Music by: André Abujamra
- Production company: Ravina Filmes
- Release date: April 30, 1999
- Running time: 70 minutes
- Country: Brazil
- Language: Portuguese
- Box office: R$ 309,094

A Glass of Rage is a Brazilian drama movie made in 1999. It is the first feature film directed by Aluizio Abranches. The screenplay is based on the work of the Brazilian writer Raduan Nassar.

It premiered at the Berlin International Film Festival and was positively received. It was also well-acclaimed in Brazil, though it received some criticism with its explicit sex scenes. The movie was launched in many countries, such as Italy, where it remained on screen for a whole year.

The film stars Júlia Lemmertz, Alexandre Borges, Marieta Severo, Ruth de Souza, and Lineu Dias as Júlia’s father.

== Cast ==
- Alexandre Borges
- Julia Lemmertz
- Lineu Dias
- Ruth de Souza
- Marieta Severo

== Release ==
It received six nominations at the 1st Grande Prêmio Cinema Brasil, of which it did not won any award. A Glass of Rage was screened in the Discovery section of the 24th Toronto International Film Festival and in the Panorama section of the 49th Berlin International Film Festival. Havana Film Festival, Washington, DC International Film Festival, Chicago Latino Film Festival, Amiens International Film Festival, and Galway International Oyster Festival also screened it.
