= Bollywood Dream =

2010 film directed by Beatriz Seigner

- Directed by: Beatriz Seigner
- Written by: Beatriz Seigner
- Starring: Paula Braun; Nataly Cabanas; Mohana Krishna; Lorena Lobato; Nithin Nair; Parmeshwaran
- Cinematography: Beatriz Seigner
- Edited by: Renata Maria
- Music by: Lorena Lobato; R. Raghavendra
- Production companies: Cinepro; Miríade Filmes; Rattapallax
- Distributed by: Espaço Filmes
- Release dates: 30 September 2010 (Rio International Film Festival); 29 April 2011
- Running time: 83 minutes
- Countries: Brazil; India
- Languages: Portuguese; English
- Budget: $20,000

Bollywood Dream (Portuguese: Bollywood Dream - O Sonho Bollywoodiano) is a 2010 Brazilian–Indian adventure-comedy film written and directed by Beatriz Seigner. It is the first co-production between Brazil and India, and the film debut of Beatriz Seigner as director.

The film follows the story of three Brazilian actresses who decide to try their luck in Bollywood, India's film industry, but once entered into the heart of Indian culture and mythology, their dreams are modified by the contrast between East and West.
