= Eliana Printes =

Brazilian singer and composer

- Born: Eliana Printes; Manaus, Amazonas, Brazil
- Origin: Rio de Janeiro
- Genres: MPB (Música Popular Brasileira)
- Occupations: Singer, songwriter and guitar player
- Website: www.elianaprintes.com.br

Eliana Printes is a Brazilian singer and composer, born in Manaus in the state of Amazonas (Brazil), where she began her career, when she was only about 12 years old. Her deep feminine voice has always called the attention of family and friends. Eliana lives nowadays in the city of Rio de Janeiro, Brazil.

With her debut album Eliana Printes (1994), Eliana received a nomination to the Sharp Awards (nowadays Tim Awards) in Brazil, in the category MPB Revelação (MPB Hit).

6 CDs, 2 song selections and many compilations released in Brazil and abroad are part of the singer's career, among them the CD "Divas Cantam Jobim", released in 2007 by Som Livre in Portugal. Also in 2007, Eliana Printes participated in Nokia Music Recommenders movie directed by Wim Wenders. In 2011 the artist participated in presentations in Germany (with the Symphony Orchestra Collegium Musicum in Potsdam) and in Austria (St. Gilgen).

== Discography ==
Until the present day, the singer has released the following CDs with compositions by herself and friends:

- Eliana Printes (1994)
- Eliana Printes (1996)
- O próximo beijo (1998)
- Pra lua tocar (2000)
- Pra você me ouvir (2003)
- Mais perto de mim (2007)

== Biography ==
Eliana Printes was born in a family of little possessions, her mother was a housewife and her father was a carpenter. He played the pandeiro and really enjoyed music. Mr. Printes worked for the Teatro Amazonas, a huge theater and opera/orchestra hall in Manaus, in the state of Amazonas in Brazil. When she was about 7, her father took her by the hand to see his workplace. She was impressed by this first experience. At about the age of 12, she started to play the guitar and from then on she knew what was her calling. Eliana grew up listening to the radio, which was on all day long at her home and also her fathers LPs. Some years after that, in 1994, she traveled to Rio de Janeiro and recorded her first CD with the title "Eliana Printes". In 1996, Indie Records hired her and from then on she recorded her other 5 CDs, presently distributed by them. In the summer 2011, the singer appears on two very important presentations outside of Brazil:

- Brasilianische Nacht (Brazilian Night) in Potsdam (Germany), with the symphony orchestra Collegium Musicum from Potsdam, mixing Brazilian and classical elements, resulting in an innovative work. The presentation has been conducted by Knut Andreas, a German conductor and music expert.
- Presentation in the museum of the instruments of the world in St. Gilgen, Austria.
