= The Last Stop (film) =

2012 film directed by Marcio Cury

- Directed by: Marcio Cury
- Written by: Di Moretti
- Produced by: Elizabeth Curi
- Starring: Mounir Maasri; Klarah Lobato; Elisa Lucinda
- Cinematography: Krishna Schmidt
- Edited by: Dirceu Lustosa
- Music by: Patrick De Jongh
- Production company: Asacine Produções
- Distributed by: Polifilmes (Brazil); Day Two Pictures (Lebanon)
- Release dates: 1 December 2012 (CIFF); 14 September 2012 (Brazil)
- Running time: 114 minutes
- Countries: Brazil; Lebanon
- Languages: Portuguese; Arabic
- Budget: R$ 3,400,000

The Last Stop is a 2012 Brazilian-Lebanese drama film directed by Marcio Cury. It was screened at the 45th Festival de Brasília, the 36th São Paulo International Film Festival, the 35th Cairo International Film Festival and the 16th Cine Las Americas International Film Festival in Austin, Texas.

The film follows the story of a Lebanese boy that is forced to leave his homeland, involved in a war that erupted in the Middle East, and migrate with the family to Brazil.

== Plot ==
The Lebanese teenager Tarik leaves his hometown in search of a better life in Brazil. On the journey by ship, he befriended other young Arabs and Syrians, but when they reached the country, each went to a different way. After 50 years, Tarik, with the help of his daughter, resolves to find the friends of the trip.

== Cast ==
- Mounir Maasri as Tarik
- Elisa Lucinda as Ciça
- Klarah Lobato as Samia
- João Antônio as Karim
- Edgard Navarro as Joseph
- Narciza Leão as Mouna
- Iberê Cavalcanti as Mohamad
- Adriano Siri as Hassan
- José Charbel as Hanna
- Chico Sant'anna as Ali
- Sérgio Fidalgo as Mustafa
- Roula Hamadeh as Mother (Najla)
- Claude Khalil as Postman
- Estephan Ghassan as Father
- Adriano Barroso as Ribeirinho Porto de Belém
- Ghassan Estefan as Father
- Sergio Fidalgo as Mustafa

== Production ==
The screenwriter Di Moretti interviewed ten Lebanese families as a source of research for the film. With three of them he did more in-depth interviews, in order to learn more about the Lebanese culture.

According to Moretti, there were two versions of the screenplay: one to be entirely filmed in Brazil and another with scenes to be shot in Lebanese territory. The second version was used in the film.
