= Foolish Heart (film) =

1998 film directed by Héctor Babenco

- Theatrical release poster
- Directed by: Héctor Babenco
- Written by: Héctor Babenco; Ricardo Piglia
- Produced by: Héctor Babenco; Oscar Kramer
- Starring: Miguel Ángel Solá; Maria Luísa Mendonça
- Cinematography: Lauro Escorel
- Edited by: Mauro Alice
- Music by: Zbigniew Preisner
- Distributed by: Columbia TriStar; Sony Pictures
- Release dates: 13 November 1998 (Brazil); 3 December 1998 (Argentina)
- Running time: 132 minutes
- Countries: Argentina; Brazil; France
- Language: Spanish

Foolish Heart (Spanish: Corazón iluminado) is a 1998 Argentine, Brazilian, and French drama film directed by Héctor Babenco. The screenplay was written by Babenco and Ricardo Piglia. The film stars Miguel Ángel Solá, Maria Luísa Mendonça, and others.

The film is based on the story by Cátulo Castillo.

== Plot ==
The film tells of seventeen-year-old Juan (Walter Quiroz). He lives with his parents and spends time with several intellectuals who are interested in photography. The girlfriend of the group's money person is Ana (Maria Luísa Mendonça), and Juan is attracted to her.

Ana spent two years at a mental institution because she was considered "crazy", yet Juan sees Ana often.

Juan is training as a door-to-door salesman, but when a photographer gives him a viewfinder, it changes his life. He's put on the path to his later success as a Hollywood director.

== Cast ==
- Miguel Ángel Solá as Juan (adult)
- Maria Luísa Mendonça as Ana
- Walter Quiroz as Juan (young)
- Xuxa Lopes as Lilith
- Norma Aleandro as Mother
- Villanueva Cosse as Father
- Oscar Ferrigno Jr. as Martin
- Alejandro Awada
- Luis Luque
- Guillermo Pfening

== Distribution ==
The film was first presented at the 1998 Cannes Film Festival in May.

=== Release dates ===
- Brazil: November 13, 1998
- Argentina: December 3, 1998
- France: November 17, 1999

== Awards ==
Nominations

- Cannes Film Festival: Golden Palm; Héctor Babenco; 1998.
- Argentine Film Critics Association Awards: Silver Condor; Best Actress, Maria Luísa Mendonça; 1999.
- Cinema Brazil, Petrópolis, Rio de Janeiro, Brazil: Cinema Brazil Grand Prize; Best Actress, Maria Luísa Mendonça; Best Cinematography, Lauro Escorel; Best Director, Héctor Babenco; 2000.
