= Maria Luísa Mendonça =

Brazilian actress

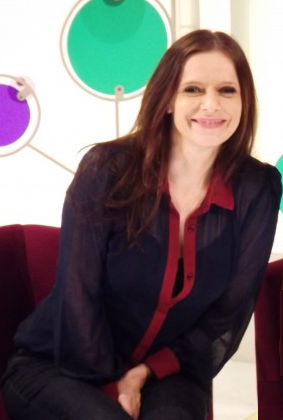
- Mendonça in 2013
- Born: 30 January 1970 (age 56); Rio de Janeiro, Brazil
- Occupation: Actress
- Years active: 1987–present
- Spouses: Rogério Gallo (m. 1994; div. 2000) Fabiano Gullane (m. 2001; div. 2004) Cláudio Torres (m. 2005; div. 2016)
- Children: 1

Maria Luísa Mendonça (born 30 January 1970) is a Brazilian actress. She debuted in television by acting in the 1993 telenovela Renascer in the role of an intersex woman, Buba. Debuting in cinema with Quem Matou Pixote?, her first most prominent role in films was in Foolish Heart, for which she was nominated for Best Actress at the 1st Grande Prêmio Cinema Brasil and at the Silver Condor Award.

== Selected filmography ==
- Renascer (1993)
- Explode Coração (1995)
- Corpo Dourado (1998)
- Foolish Heart (1998)
- A Muralha (2000)
- The Three Marias (2002)
- Carandiru (2003)
- Um Só Coração (2004)
- Senhora do Destino (2004)
- Mandrake (2005)
- Querô (2007)
- A Mulher Invisível (2009)
- Viver a Vida (2009)
- O Homem do Futuro (2011)
- Sessão de Terapia (2012)
- Além do Horizonte (2013)

== Selected television ==
- Magnifica 70 (2015–16)
- Sítio do Picapau Amarelo (2002)
