= The Three Marias =

2002 film directed by Aluizio Abranches

- Theatrical release poster
- Directed by: Aluizio Abranches
- Written by: Heitor Dhalia; Wilson Freire
- Produced by: Aluizio Abranches; Eva Mariani; Dedete Parente Costa
- Starring: Marieta Severo; Julia Lemmertz; Maria Luisa Mendonça; Luiza Mariani
- Cinematography: Marcelo Dust
- Music by: André Abujamra
- Production company: Lama Filmes
- Distributed by: Lumière; Empire Pictures (US); Gala Film (UK)
- Release date: August 2, 2002
- Running time: 90 minutes
- Countries: Brazil; Italy
- Language: Portuguese
- Box office: R$76,819 ($32,761)

The Three Marias is a Brazilian drama film made in 2002. It is the second feature film by the Brazilian filmmaker Aluizio Abranches. Marieta Severo, Júlia Lemmertz, Maria Luísa Mendonça and Luíza Mariani lead the cast. Also in the cast are Lázaro Ramos, Wagner Moura, Carlos Vereza and Tuca Andrada.

The movie is a shakespearean tragedy in the countryside of Pernambuco. It premiered at the Berlin International Film Festival, achieving excellent reviews in Brazil and abroad, being critically acclaimed in international level.

== Cast ==
- Marieta Severo as Filomena Capadócio
- Julia Lemmertz as Maria Francisca
- Maria Luisa Mendonça as Maria Rosa
- Luiza Mariani as Maria Pia
- Carlos Vereza as Firmino Santos Guerra
- Enrique Diaz as Zé das Cobras
- Tuca Andrada as corporal Tenorio (capt. Tenorio in the English version)
- Wagner Moura as Jesuíno Cruz, cavalo do cão (Devil's Horse in English)

== Reception ==
The Three Marias grossed R$76,819 ($32,761) and was watched by 13,003 people in the 10 Brazilian theaters in which it was released. It received mixed reviews by English-speaking reviewers. On review aggregation website Rotten Tomatoes, the film has a 40% rating based on 20 reviews, with an average score of 5.4/10. On Metacritic, which assigns a normalised rating out of 100 based on reviews from critics, the film has a score of 45 (indicating "mixed or average reviews") based on 9 reviews.
