= Meu Nome Não É Johnny =

2008 film directed by Mauro Lima

- Theatrical release poster
- Directed by: Mauro Lima
- Written by: Guilherme Fiúza; Mariza Leão; Mauro Lima
- Starring: Selton Mello; Cleo Pires
- Cinematography: Mitchell Amundsen
- Production companies: Globo Filmes; Downtown Filmes
- Distributed by: Columbia Pictures (through Sony Pictures Releasing International)
- Release date: January 4, 2008
- Running time: 118 minutes
- Country: Brazil
- Language: Portuguese

Meu Nome Não É Johnny (English: My Name Ain't Johnny) is a 2008 Brazilian film directed by Mauro Lima. A box office hit, it was one of the 14 films considered by the Ministry of Culture to represent Brazil in the competition for the Academy Award for Best Foreign Language Film at the 2008 ceremony. The film was based on the book Meu Nome Não é Johnny by Guilherme Fiuza.

== Synopsis ==
The film narrates the true story of João Guilherme Estrella, an upper-middle-class man from the State of Rio de Janeiro that would become the head of luxury drug trafficking for the wealthy elite in the late 1980s and early 1990s.

João is a young boy from an upper-middle-class family of the city of Niterói, the second wealthiest city in the state of Rio. He demonstrates a knack for entrepreneurship early on in his life, when he delivers papers as a teenager, unusual for an upper-middle-class teen in Brazil. Once his parents get divorced, João begins partying a lot, holding lavish parties in the basement of his dad's house. At one of these parties, João meets his love interest, Sofia. The more he parties, the more he begins dealing cocaine, tying back to the entrepreneurship alluded to at the start of the film.

The film shows the glamorous side of drug dealing, with João and Sofia dealing in Europe and spending exorbitant sums of money.

Eventually, João gets caught and sent to prison and court. He tries to lie his way out of the situation in court, but then takes pity on the woman who would get blamed instead of him and does his time in prison. João's story is received as a tale of rehabilitation, as now he is a successful musician and music producer.

== Themes ==
Glamorization of Drug Lifestyle The drug dealing lifestyle is extremely glamorized in My Name Ain't Johnny. It is painted as a lifestyle that brings money and happiness without much effort, which speaks to the idea present in many Brazilian crime films of social mobility. Though João is already in the upper tier of Brazilians, the prospect of rising even further without much effort acts as even more of an incentive to get involved in the glamorous lifestyle of drugs. This glamorous lifestyle is later juxtaposed with the grim prison, where most (if not all) of the inmates have not come from João's background.

== Cast ==
- Selton Mello as João Guilherme Estrella
- Cléo Pires as Sofia
- Júlia Lemmertz as Estrella's mother
- Giulio Lopes as Estrella's father
- Cássia Kiss as judge
- Rafaela Mandelli as Laura
- Ângelo Paes Leme as Julinho
- Eva Todor as D. Marly
- Gillray Coutinho as lawyer
