= Júlia Lemmertz =

Brazilian actress

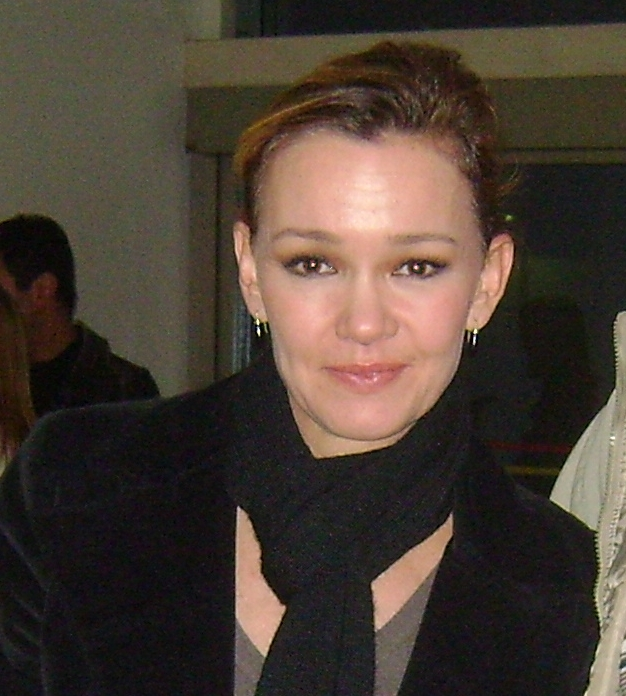
- Lemmertz in 2011
- Born: Júlia Lemmertz Dias; March 18, 1963 (age 63); Porto Alegre, Rio Grande do Sul, Brazil
- Occupation: Actress
- Years active: 1981–present
- Spouses: Álvaro Osório (m. 1987; div. 1990) Alexandre Borges (m. 1993; div. 2015)
- Children: 2
- Mother: Lílian Lemmertz

Júlia Lemmertz Dias (born March 18, 1963) is a Brazilian television, film and stage actress.

== Biography and career ==
Júlia was born in Porto Alegre, Rio Grande do Sul, to actors Lineu Dias and Lílian Lemmertz. Her career started when she was a child, and since then, Lemmertz has starred in over 40 soap operas.

== Personal life ==
Lemmertz was married to Álvaro Osório, a Rede Globo executive, from 1986 to 1990, with whom she had a daughter, Luiza (born 1987).

While filming Guerra Sem Fim (1993), Lemmertz began a relationship with actor Alexandre Borges. The couple married in 1993 and had a son, Miguel (born 2000). They divorced in 2015.

Lemmertz has practiced Transcendental Meditation since 1983 and says, "Meditation generates enormous well-being."

== Career ==
=== Television ===
Year	Title	Role
1981	Os Adolescentes	Bianca (Bia)
1982	Ninho da Serpente	Mariana
1983	Moinhos de Vento	Milena
1983	Sabor de Mel	Beatriz
1983	Eu Prometo	Adriana Cantomaia
1983	Caso Especial, Otelo de Oliveira	Desdêmona
1984	Amor com Amor Se Paga	Ângela
1985	Tenda dos Milagres	Luísa
1985	Ti Ti Ti	Cecília Spina (jovem)
1986	Mania de Querer	Carolina
1987	Carmem	Micaela
1989	Kananga do Japão	Sílvia
1990	Mãe de Santo	—N/a
1991	Ilha das Bruxas	—N/a
1991	Na Rede de Intrigas	Teresa
1991	Amazônia	Maria Luísa
1993	Guerra sem Fim	Flávia
1995	Você Decide, A Dama de Ferro	—N/a
1996	Você Decide, Amor à Vida	—N/a
1996	Quem É Você?	Débora
1997	Joana e Marcelo, Amor à Primeira Vista	Joana
1997	Zazá	Fabiana Dumont
1998	Você Decide, Trabalho Escravo	—N/a
1999	Joana e Marcelo, Amor que Fica	Joana
1999	Andando nas Nuvens	Lúcia Helena
2001	Porto dos Milagres	Genésia Pereira
2001	Os Normais, Um Pouco de Cultura É Normal	Helena
2002	Joana e Marcelo, Amor (Quase) Perfeito	Joana
2002	Esperança	Geovanna Tornatore
2002	O Beijo do Vampiro	Marta Morta
2002	Os Normais, Um Programinha Normal	Sílvia
2003	Os Normais, A Vingança da CDF	Aninha
2003	Celebridade	Noêmia Assunção
2004	O Pequeno Alquimista	Morgana
2004	A Diarista, O Namorado de uma Patroa Minha	Surya
2005	Alma Gêmea	Cleide
2006	JK	Dona Júlia
2006	Minha Nada Mole Vida, Tem Sentido Isso!	Ivana
2006	Minha Nada Mole Vida, A Chave Mestra	Ivana
2007	Amazônia, de Galvez a Chico Mendes	Risoleta
2007	Minha Nada Mole Vida, Imprevistos Acontecem	Wanda Maxuel
2007	Desejo Proibido	Dona Belinda Botiquário
2008	Casos e Acasos, A Vaga, a Entrevista e o Cachorro-Quente	Carla
2008	Nada Fofa	Ema
2009	Tudo Novo de Novo	Clara
2010	Araguaia	Maria Amélia Martinez
2011	Fina Estampa	Esther Wolkoff Siqueira
2013	Guerra dos Sexos	Blanche Paes Leme
2013	A Grande Família	Sônia
2014	Em Família	Helena Fernandes Machado (Leninha)
2015	Além do Tempo	Dorotéia Borghini
2021	Quanto Mais Vida, Melhor!	Carmem Wollinger

=== Films ===
Year	Title	Role	Notes
1982	As Aventuras de Mário Fofoca		
1984	Patriamada		
1984	Mal Star		
1986	A Cor do Seu Destino	Patrícia	
1990	Lua de Cristal	Lidinha (Maria Lídia)	
1990	Vaidade		
1993	Amor Materno		
1995	Jenipapo	Júlia	
1997	Glaura		
1997	Mangueira - Amor à Primeira Vista		
1998	A Hora Mágica	Lúcia	
1999	Um Copo de Cólera		
1999	Até que a Vida Nos Separe	Maria	
1999	Amor Que Fica		
1999	Tiradentes	Antônia	
2001	Nelson Gonçalves	Lourdinha Bittencourt	
2002	Joana e Marcelo, Amor (Quase) Perfeito		
2002	Poeta de Sete Faces		
2003	Acquária	Nara	
2003	Cristina Quer Casar	Bia	
2003	As Três Marias	Maria Francisca	
2005	Jogo Subterrâneo	Laura	
2006	Gatão de Meia Idade	Betty	
2007	Onde Andará Dulce Veiga?	Lídia	
2008	Mulheres Sexo Verdades Mentira	Lara	
2008	Meu Nome Não É Johnny	Maria Lu	
2009	Bela Noite Para Voar	Letícia	
2009	Do Começo ao Fim	Julieta	
2011	Amor?	Alice	
2016	The Jungle Book	Raksha	Portuguese voice-over translation
2016	Little Secret	Heloísa Schurmann	
