= Aluizio Abranches =

Brazilian film director

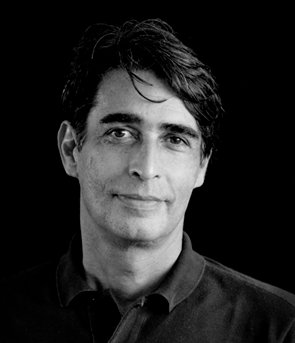
- Born: July 17, 1961 (age 65); Rio de Janeiro, Brazil
- Occupation: Film director
- Years active: 1989–present

Aluizio Abranches (born 17 July 1961) is a Brazilian film director.

Aluizio Abranches graduated from the London Film School and Universidade Cândido Mendes with degrees in cinema and economics. His films explore themes of family and love.

== Career ==
After graduating in economics, Abranches studied cinema at the London Film School. Upon returning to Brazil, he directed short films such as Duplo Três, O Pulo do Gato, and A Porta Aberta (1989). He initially joined the production of Carlota Joaquina but left the project after four months. He then secured the rights to adapt Raduan Nassar's novel Um Copo de Cólera after meeting with the author. For his debut feature, Abranches cast Alexandre Borges and Julia Lemmertz after seeing them perform together in a stage production of Hamlet.

== Filmography ==
- 1989 - A Porta Aberta (short film)
- 1999 - A Glass of Rage (Um Copo de Cólera) – based on the novel by Raduan Nassar.
- 2002 - The Three Marias (As Três Marias) – a revenge drama set in northeastern Brazil.
- 2009 – From Beginning to End (Do Começo ao Fim) – explores the relationship between two brothers and marks the third collaboration with Julia Lemmertz.
- 2015 – Happily Married (Bem Casados) – a romantic comedy starring Alexandre Borges and Camila Morgado.

== Personal life ==
Abranches is the son of a lawyer and a physician. His mother died in a car accident, an event he cited as an influence on his film From Beginning to End. He has described himself as "sexual" rather than identifying with a specific sexual orientation, noting that he has had relationships with both men and women. Abranches is also a volunteer for the international organization ActionAid, focusing on projects to combat poverty and violence against women in Brazil.
