= Films depicting Latin American military dictatorships =

This is a list of movies that are related to the military dictatorships in Latin America and Caribbean that appeared during the context of the Cold War.

== Argentina ==
- The Hour of the Furnaces (1968)
- Last Days of the Victim (1982)
- Plata dulce (1982)
- Jacobo Timerman: Prisoner Without a Name, Cell Without a Number (1983)
- Funny Little Dirty War (1983)
- The Official Story (1985)
- The Mothers of Plaza de Mayo (1985)
- Night of the Pencils (1986)
- The Girlfriend (1988)
- Verónico Cruz (1988)
- Buenos Aires Vice Versa (1996)
- Angel Face (1998)
- Olympic Garage (1999)
- The Lost Steps (2001)
- Kamchatka (2002)
- The Blonds (2003)
- Imagining Argentina (2003)
- El Nüremberg Argentino (2004)
- Captive (2005)
- Hermanas (2005)
- Chronicle of an Escape (2006)
- Complici del Silenzio (2009)
- The Secret in Their Eyes (2009)
- Te Extraño (2010)
- The Day I Was Not Born (2010)
- Clandestine Childhood (2011)
- The Clan (2015)
- Francis: Pray for Me (2015)
- Call Me Francis (2015)
- Rojo (2018)
- The Two Popes (2019)
- Argentina, 1985 (2022)
- The Penguin Lessons (2024)

== Brazil ==
- Entranced Earth (1967)
- A Opinião Pública (1967)
- The Brave Warrior (1968)
- Fênix (1980)
- They Don't Wear Black Tie (1981)
- Pra Frente, Brasil (1982)
- A Freira e a Tortura (1983)
- Jango (1984)
- Nunca Fomos tão Felizes (1984)
- Em Nome da Segurança Nacional (1984)
- Twenty Years Later (1985)
- Kiss of the Spider Woman (1985)
- Que Bom Te Ver Viva (1989)
- Beyond Citizen Kane (1993)
- Lamarca (1994)
- Four Days in September (1997)
- Ação entre Amigos (1998)
- Dois Córregos - Verdades Submersas no Tempo (1999)
- Tempo de Resistência (2003)
- Cabra-Cega (2004)
- Araguaya - A Conspiração do Silêncio (2004)
- Almost Brothers (2004)
- AI-5 - O Dia Que Não Existiu (2004) (TV)
- 1972 (2006)
- Zuzu Angel (2006)
- The Year My Parents Went on Vacation (2006)
- Batismo de Sangue (2006)
- Hércules 56 (2006)
- Cidadão Boilesen (2009)
- Em Teu Nome (2009)
- Peacetime (2009)
- Topografia de um Desnudo (2009)
- Lula, The Son of Brasil (2010)
- Hoje (2011)
- Uma Longa Viagem (2011)
- Avanti Popolo (2012)
- A Memória que Me Contam (2012)
- Os Dias Com Ele (2013)
- O Dia que Durou 21 Anos (2013)
- Em Busca de Iara (2013)
- Rio 2096: A Story of Love and Fury (2013)
- Tatuagem (2013)
- Marighella (film) (2019)
- I'm Still Here (2024)
- The Secret Agent (2025)

== Chile ==
- The Battle of Chile (1975)
- It's Raining on Santiago (1976)
- Noch nad Chili (1977)
- Missing (1982)
- A Cor do Seu Destino (1986)
- Chile: Hasta Cuando? (1986)
- Sweet Country (1987)
- The House of the Spirits (1993)
- Of Love and Shadows (1994)
- Death and the Maiden (1994)
- Amnesia (1994)
- Waking the Dead (2000)
- Machuca (2004)
- The Black Pimpernel (2007)
- Tony Manero (2008)
- Dawson Isla 10 (2009)
- Post Mortem (2010)
- No (2012)
- Colonia (film) (2015)
- Spider (film) (2019)
- 1976 (film) (2022)
- El Conde (2023)
- Underground Stories (2023)

== Dominican Republic ==
- In the Time of the Butterflies (2001)
- The Feast of the Goat (2005)
- Trópico de Sangre (2009)

== El Salvador ==
- In the Name of the People (1985)
- Salvador (1986)
- Romero (1989)
- Voces inocentes (2004)

== Guatemala ==
- El Norte (1983)
- The Evil That Men Do (1984)

== Haiti ==
- The Comedians (1967)
- The Serpent and the Rainbow (1988)

== Nicaragua ==
- Under Fire (1983)
- Last Plane Out (1983)
- Latino (1985)
- Clinton and Nadine (1988)

== Panama ==
- Noriega: God's Favorite (2000)

== Paraguay ==
- One Man's War (1991)
- Miss Ameriguá (1994)
- Killing the Dead (2019)
- Under the Flags, the Sun (2025)

== Uruguay ==
- State of Siege (1972)
- Matar a todos (2007)
- Paisito (2008)
- Polvo nuestro que estás en los cielos (2008)
- Mundialito (2010)
- Zanahoria (2014)
- Migas de pan (2016)
- A Twelve-Year Night (2018)
- The Moneychanger (2019)
- El año de la furia (2020)

== Operation Condor ==
- State of Siege (1972)
- Down Came a Blackbird (1995)
- Escadrons de la mort, l'école française (2003)
- Condor (2008)
- Forgotten (post-production)

== See also ==
- Dirty War
- Mothers of the Plaza de Mayo
- Grupo Cine Liberación
- Dictator novel
- Military dictatorship
- Third Cinema
- List of films about martial law under Ferdinand Marcos
