= The Mechanism (TV series) =

Brazilian television series

- Also known as: The Mechanism
- O Mecanismo
- Genre: Political drama
- Created by: Elena Soarez; José Padilha
- Written by: Elena Soarez; Sofia Maldonado
- Directed by: José Padilha; Felipe Prado; Marcos Prado; Daniel Rezende
- Starring: Selton Mello; Caroline Abras; Enrique Díaz; Antonio Saboia; Lee Taylor; Otto Jr.; Leonardo Medeiros; Jonathan Haagensen; Alessandra Colassanti; Susana Ribeiro; Ravel Cabral
- Country of origin: Brazil
- Original language: Portuguese
- No. of seasons: 2
- No. of episodes: 16

Production
- Executive producers: José Padilha; Marcos Prado
- Production locations: Brasília; Curitiba; Rio de Janeiro; São Paulo; Ciudad del Este
- Production company: Zazen Produções

Original release
- Network: Netflix
- Release: 23 March 2018 – 10 May 2019

O Mecanismo (transl. The Mechanism) is a Brazilian political drama television series created by José Padilha and Elena Soarez, directed by Padilha, Felipe Prado, and Marcos Prado, and written by Elena Soarez. The show depicts Operation Car Wash (Portuguese: Operação Lava Jato), an ongoing police taskforce that discovered a widespread corruption scheme involving the Brazilian government and several prominent engineering firms. The series premiered all episodes of the first season March 23, 2018, worldwide, on Netflix.

On May 28, 2018, the series was renewed for a second season. The second season premiered on Netflix on May 10, 2019.

== Plot ==
Marco Ruffo (Selton Mello) is a Federal Police agent obsessed with the case he is investigating. When he least expects it, he and his apprentice, Verena Cardoni (Carol Abras), are already immersed in one of the largest diversion and money laundering investigations in Brazilian history. The proportion is so great that the course of investigations completely changes the lives of all involved.

== Cast ==
- Selton Mello as Marco Ruffo
- Caroline Abras as Verena Cardoni
- Enrique Díaz as Roberto Ibrahim
- Leonardo Medeiros as João Pedro Rangel
- Alessandra Colassanti as Wilma Kitano
- Jonathan Haagensen as Vander
- Otto Jr. as Judge Paulo Rigo
- Susana Ribeiro as Regina
- Antonio Saboia as Dimas
- Lee Taylor as Claudio Amadeu

== Production ==
=== Development ===
In April 2016, Netflix announced that it would produce an original, still untitled series that would follow the investigations of Operation Car Wash. The series was produced by José Padilha, Marcos Prado and the production company Zazen Produções and written by Elena Soarez and Sofia Maldonado. The series was directed by José Padilha, Felipe Prado, Marcos Prado and Daniel Rezende.

=== Filming ===
The Mechanism started its production in May 2017. Filming locations included the cities of São Paulo, Rio de Janeiro, Curitiba and Brasília.

== Reception ==
The first season of the series hold a approval rate of 80% in the review aggregator Rotten Tomatoes based on 10 ratings.

Cassio Starling, in a criticism for Folha de S. Paulo, said that "As was clear from both " Elite Squad ", in addition to the box office success, Padilha seeks to provoke social responses, make the public react to anesthesia and automatic slogans .The enormous attention focused on Lava Jato, on the effects of investigations on the present and the immediate future of the country, could not escape the opportunism of Padilha. Therefore, “The Mechanism” developed little by little, almost insidiously, another plot, which justifies after all, the title. By introducing this fundamental question Padilha reaches a dimension, in fact, more political and less police, more daily and less exceptional. "

Fábio de Souza Gomes, from Omelete, wrote that the program presents tiring fiction, unnecessary parallel plots, but has outstanding performances. He also commented that "although it doesn't seem a little forced, [Selton] Mello improves a lot throughout the series and manages to lead the story well in the shadows while [Caroline] Abras creates a complex and strong detective who seeks to find the corruption behind the country "He added that" The Mechanism could have been much better than it actually was. "

Adolfo Molina, from Observatório do Cinema, summarizes that "The Mechanism is a failure as a representation of historical facts in Brazil for trying to seek exemption from the bias and failing, and a work of fiction also fails to fall into this trap."

Ritter Fan, from Plano Crítico, wrote that "The scripts of the episodes, all written by Elena Soarez, are beyond didactic, with endless repetitions that hit the same monkkey practically every chapter like" fighting cancer does not leave anyone unscathed And things like that. In the field of performances, Selton Mello once again shows that he is one of the best Brazilian actors of his generation, even considering his irritating inability to speak out, his trademark since the beginning that makes understanding what he babble quite complicated. " He praised Enrique Díaz, saying that the performance "immediately resembled that of Robert Knepper as T-Bag, in Prison Break, that is, a rascal and rascal shaped to make us hate him, but at the same time we love him." He concluded by saying that "The Mechanism is a series with potential, but that it is not fully realized."

== Similarities with real life events ==
Despite the recurrent disclaimer at the start of each episode, declaring the screenplay is loosely based on a true story, with characters and events adapted for dramatic effect, many characters and companies depicted (but not all facts regarding them) can be easily traced to the actual people and companies involved in Operation Car Wash. Some such associations are:

Character/Company	Counterpart	Actor
Petrobrasil	Petrobras	
Constructor OSA	OAS Group	
Constructor Miller&Brecht	Odebrecht	
Roberto Ibrahim	Alberto Youssef	Enrique Diaz
Judge Paulo Rigo	Judge Sergio Moro	Otto Jr.
Former President João "Gino" Higino	Then-Former President of Brazil Luiz Inácio Lula da Silva	Arthur Kohl
President Janete Ruscov	Then-President of Brazil Dilma Rousseff	Sura Berditchevsky
Senator Lúcio Lemes	Senator Aécio Neves	Michel Bercovitch
Vice President Samuel Thames	Then-Vice President of Brazil Michel Temer	Tonio Carvalho
Mario Garcez Brito	Márcio Thomaz Bastos	Pietro Mário
João Pedro Rangel (Pepê)	Paulo Roberto Costa	Leonardo Medeiros
Ricardo Brecht	Marcelo Odebrecht	Emílio Orciollo Netto
Lorival Bueno (OSA CEO)	Léo Pinheiro, then OAS Group CEO	Sidney Guedes
Attorney General (no name in the show)	Then-Prosecutor General of Brazil Rodrigo Janot	Lionel Fischer
Prosecutor Dimas Donatelli	Prosecutor Deltan Dallagnol	Antonio Saboia
Maria Tereza, Miller&Brecht Personal Assistant	Maria Lúcia Tavares, then Odebrecht Executive Assistant	Anna Cotrim
Police Chief Verena Cardoni	Police Chief Erika Marena	Caroline Abras
Agent "China"	Newton Ishii, agent of the Federal Police of Brazil	Fábio Yoshihara

== Episodes ==
Season	Episodes	Originally released
1	8	March 23, 2018
2	8	May 10, 2019

=== Season 1 (2018) ===
No. overall	No. in season	Title	English title	Directed by	Written by	Original release date
1	1	"Lava Jato"	Car Wash	José Padilha	Elena Soarez	March 23, 2018
The family of federal delegate Marco Ruffo is being threatened after he tries to frame Roberto Ibrahim for money laundering.
2	2	"Halawi"	Halvah	Felipe Prado	Elena Soarez	March 23, 2018
10 years later, Verena continues to investigate Ibrahim and the doleiros who work with him.
3	3	"Ventos Frios Vindos do Sul"	Cool Winds from the South	Felipe Prado	Elena Soarez	March 23, 2018
The Federal Police team works hard to carry out an operation with multiple targets, but important evidence disappears.
4	4	"Fundo Falso"	False Bottom	Marcos Prado	Elena Soarez	March 23, 2018
Guilhome gets some unexpected help. Verena goes after João Pedro, and Judge Rigo reflects on a decision that can change everything.
5	5	"Olhos Vermelhos"	Red Eyes	Marcos Prado	Elena Soarez	March 23, 2018
Verena has a feeling she can not trust anyone else. Ibrahim's wife is furious to find out what her husband has done in jail.
6	6	"Eles Sabiam de Tudo"	They Knew It All	Marcos Prado	Elena Soarez	March 23, 2018
To force João Pedro to speak what he knows, investigators are seeking charges against his family. But a leak puts the whole operation at risk.
7	7	"O Último Respiro"	One Last Breath	Daniel Rezende	Elena Soarez	March 23, 2018
The "Clube dos 13" (Club of 13) rush to close an agreement with the attorney general. In dealing with a sewage problem in the neighborhood, Ruffo has an epiphany and understands the origin of everything.
8	8	"Juízo Final"	Doomsday	Daniel Rezende	Elena Soarez	March 23, 2018
Verena receives devastating news. Ruffo reevaluates his priorities. Dimas and Cláudio learn of the fate of Operation "Juízo Final" (Doomsday).

=== Season 2 (2019) ===
No. overall	No. in season	Title	English title	Directed by	Written by	Original release date
9	1	"De onde vem a lama?"	Where Does the Mud Comes From?	José Padilha	Elena Soarez	May 10, 2019
Ruffo gets a valuable price from the secretary of the 13th contractor, Ricardo Bretch. Verena and Guilhone find themselves under investigation.
10	2	"Del Este"	Del Este	José Padilha	Elena Soarez	May 10, 2019
Vander's illegal wiretap pays off. When Ibrahim's new venture gets off to a bad start, his money-hungry wife makes a fatal error.
11	3	"Adictos"	Addicts	José Padilha	Elena Soarez	May 10, 2019
Ruffo gets a surprise when he visits his wife at the ranch, and later makes a deal with Maria Tereza, who is followed home after picking up her son.
12	4	"O grande ilusionista"	The Great Illusionist	José Padilha	Elena Soarez	May 10, 2019
Disciplined as ever, Bretch gets to work on a plan and gives his wife instructions. To find Ibrahim, Ruffo follows another trail Luz Maria has left.
13	5	"Ponte da Amizade"	Friendship Bridge	José Padilha	Elena Soarez	May 10, 2019
Following the cigarette lead, Ruffo heads to Paraguay. When Guilhome learns Ruffo is pursuing Ibrahim alone, he sets out to find him and bring him back.
14	6	"Réquiem"	Requiem	José Padilha	Elena Soarez	May 10, 2019
Verena finds herself at Ibrahim's mercy. When Eva is unable to convince Bretch to talk before Ibrahim does, she calls a political ally for help.
15	7	"O fim e os meios"	The Ends and the Means	Daniel Rezende	Elena Soarez	May 10, 2019
When Tom Carvalho tells Verena and the DA's office about shady deals involving former President Gino, Rigo issues orders that ignite a public firestorm.
16	8	"Canastra Suja"	Dirty Canastra	José Padilha	Elena Soarez	May 10, 2019
Rigo is unable to ignore the new wiretap recording. The prospect of Thames becoming president spurs Verena to find a way to break Bretch's silence.

== Awards and nominations ==
Year	Award	Category	Nominee(s)	Result	Ref.
2018	Golden Trailer Awards	Golden Trailer	Best Foreign (TV Spot/Trailer/Teaser for a series)	Nominated	
2018	São Paulo Association of Art Critics Awards	Best Director	José Padilha	Nominated	
2019	Associação Brasileira de Cinematografia	TV - Best Cinematography	Episode: Juízo Final (Doomsday)	Nominated	
