= João Baldasserini =

Brazilian actor

- Born: João Carlos Baldasserini; 23 January 1984 (age 41); São Paulo, Brazil
- Other names: João Balda
- Occupation: Actor
- Years active: 2005-present
- Spouse: Erica Lopes (m. 2019)
- Children: 1

João Carlos Baldasserini (born January 23, 1984) is a Brazilian actor.

== Biography ==
João was born in the city of São Paulo and raised during his childhood and adolescence in the city of Indaiatuba, in the interior of the state of São Paulo. He is the son of singer Kika Baldasserini. At the age of 17, he switched from law to performing arts at the Conservatório Dramático e Musical Doutor Carlos de Campos in Tatuí. After completing the course, in 2004, he moved to São Paulo, where he attended the Escola de Arte Dramática da Escola de Comunicação e Artes da Universidade de São Paulo (EAD/ECA/USP) in parallel with the cinema course at the Studio Fátima Toledo.

== Career ==
Among his works in the theater are the play Noite na Taverna, with Teatro da Curva, and then he joined Cia. Os Satyros, starring in the plays A Vida na Praça Roosevelt (2006), by Dea Loher, Liz (2008), by Reinaldo Montero, and Vestido de Noiva (2008), by Nelson Rodrigues, directed by Rodolfo García Vázquez. In 2012, he acted in the plays Jamais Seremos Tão Jovens and Guarde um Beijo Meu. In cinema, he acted in the feature films Quase Samba (2013), Hoje and Linha de Passe (2008), by Walter Salles and Daniela Thomas. On television, he was part of the cast of the soap opera Tempos Modernos (2010), O Astro (2011), the series A Teia, both on Rede Globo, and Passionais, a GNT series directed by Henrique Goldman, in which he starred alongside the actress Betty Faria. In 2015, he starred in the miniseries Felizes para Sempre?, starring Paolla Oliveira, as Caroline Abras' romantic partner. In 2015 he joined the cast of the soap opera A Regra do Jogo, playing the comic villain Victor, where he acted alongside Giovanna Antonelli. In 2016, he starred in the soap opera Haja Coração, alongside Mariana Ximenes, playing the seductive Beto Velásquez. In 2017, there is the clumsy Agnaldo, one of the hotel's four thieves in the soap opera Pega Pega. In 2018, there is the ambitious and secretive villain Emílio and his twin brother, the mysterious Lúcio, who gradually reveals himself to be just like his brother in O Tempo Não Para. In 2020, he played Zezinho, one of the protagonists of Salve-se Quem Puder.

In 2023, after leaving TV Globo, he signed a contract with SBT, to play Daniel Matos, the adult protagonist and father of the child protagonist Julieta Campos in the children's soap opera A Infância de Romeu e Julieta.

== Personal life ==
Baldasserini married Erica Lopes on August 17, 2019 in Indaiatuba, in the interior of São Paulo. The couple has been together since 2018. The couple's first child, named Helano, was born on November 12, 2019.

== Filmography ==
=== Television ===
Year	Title	Role
2010	Tempos Modernos	Túlio Osório
2011	O Astro	Henri Sorei
2013	Passionais	Renê
2014	A Teia	Cabeleira
2014	Surtadas na Yoga	Andrei
2014	Motel	Rubem
2015	Felizes para Sempre?	Joel Drummond
2015	Os Experientes	Altair Pereira da Silva
2015	A Regra do Jogo	Victor
2016	Haja Coração	Roberto Velásquez (Beto)
2017	Pega Pega	Agnaldo
2018	O Tempo Não Para	Emilio Inglês de Souza
2018	O Tempo Não Para	Lúcio Inglês de Souza
2020	Salve-se Quem Puder	José Prazeroso (Zezinho) / Miguel Dias
2023	A Infância de Romeu e Julieta	Daniel Campos
2024	Família É Tudo	Ernesto Garcia

=== Film ===
Year	Title	Role
2008	Linha de Passe	Dênis
2011	Hoje	Charger 1
2013	Quase Samba	Charles
2014	Na Quebrada	
2016	Apaixonados - O Filme	Hugo
2017	Polícia Federal: A Lei É para Todos	Vinícius
2019	Crô em Família	Nando

== Theater ==
Year	Title
2005	Noite na Taverna
2006	A Vida na Praça Roosevelt
2008	Liz
2008	Vestido de Noiva
2012	Jamais Seremos Tão Jovens
2012	Guarde um Beijo Meu
2012	O Casamento do Pequeno Burguês
2014	Felizes 30!
