= Alliance for Progress =

US initiative for economic cooperation with Latin America

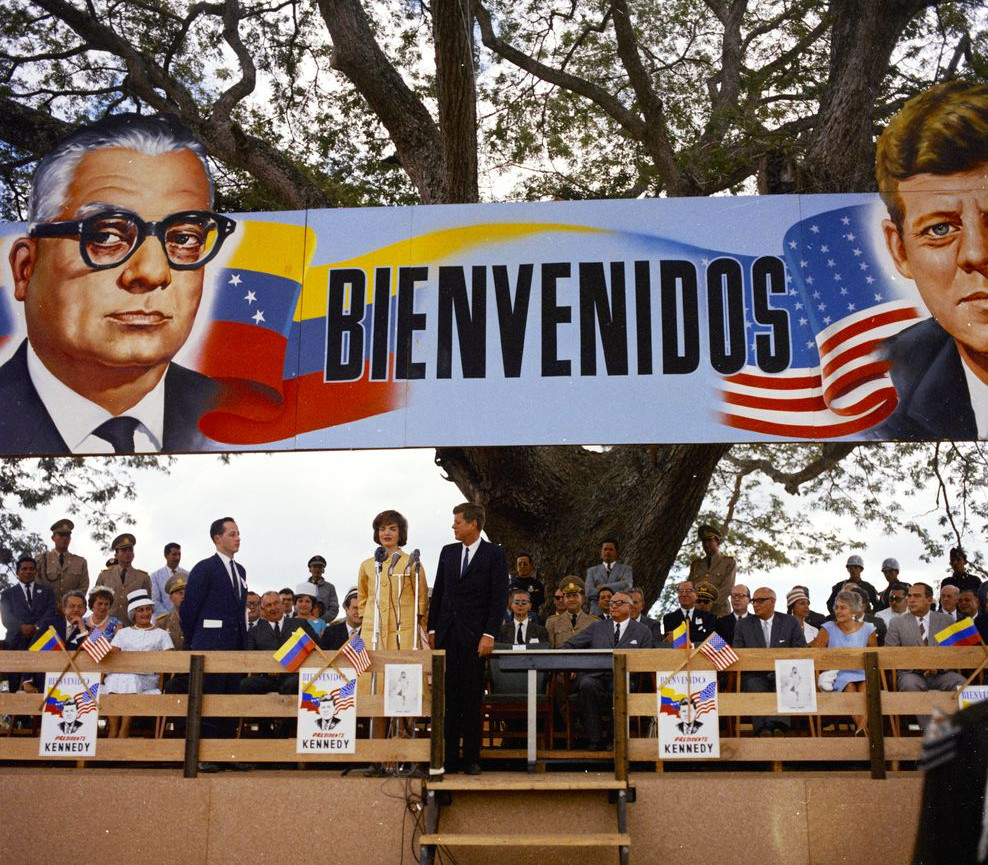
U.S. President John F. Kennedy in December 1961 promoting the Alliance for Progress with Venezuelan President Rómulo Betancourt, who had invited Kennedy to this land redistribution ceremony in a Venezuelan village. Kennedy's wife, Jacqueline, addressed the audience in Spanish. Video of this ceremony can be seen here.

The Alliance for Progress (Spanish: Alianza para el progreso) was an initiative launched by U.S. President John F. Kennedy on March 13, 1961, that aimed to establish economic cooperation between the U.S. and Latin America. Governor Luis Muñoz Marín of Puerto Rico was a close advisor on Latin American affairs to Kennedy, and one of his top administrators, Teodoro Moscoso, the architect of "Operation Bootstrap", was named the coordinator of the program by President Kennedy.

The Alliance for Progress was a 10-year plan proposed by President John F. Kennedy in 1961 to foster economic cooperation between North and South America, particularly aimed at countering the perceived communist threat from Cuba. The program was signed at an inter-American conference in Uruguay in August 1961. The main objectives of the Alliance for Progress included:

- Economic Development: The plan aimed to achieve an annual increase of 2.5 percent in per capita income in Latin American countries, with the goal of promoting economic growth and reducing poverty.
- Democratic Governments: The charter called for the establishment and support of democratic governments in Latin America, promoting political stability and the protection of human rights.
- Education and Literacy: One of the goals was to eliminate adult illiteracy in Latin America by 1970, recognizing education as a crucial factor for social and economic development.
- Price Stability: The Alliance aimed to maintain price stability in the region, avoiding high inflation or deflation, which could hinder economic progress.
- Income Distribution and Land Reform: The program sought to promote more equitable income distribution and land reform to address social and economic inequalities.
- Economic and Social Planning: Latin American countries were expected to create comprehensive plans for national development, which would be reviewed and approved by an inter-American board of experts.
- Financial Commitment: The participating Latin American countries pledged a capital investment of $80 billion over 10 years, while the United States would provide or guarantee $20 billion in aid.
- Tax Reform: The tax codes in Latin American countries were to be revised to demand a greater contribution from the wealthier individuals and corporations, aiming for a fairer distribution of the tax burden.

The Alliance for Progress aimed to strengthen ties between the United States and Latin America, promoting economic growth, political stability, and social progress. However, the success of the program was limited due to various challenges, including political instability, corruption, and insufficient implementation of the proposed reforms.

== Origin and targets ==
The United States government began to strengthen diplomatic relations with Latin America in the late 1950s during the presidency of Dwight D. Eisenhower.

In March 1961, the newly inaugurated President Kennedy proposed a ten-year plan for Latin America:

...we propose to complete the revolution of the Americas, to build a hemisphere where all men can hope for a suitable standard of living, and all can live out their lives in dignity and in freedom. To achieve this goal political freedom must accompany material progress...Let us once again transform the American Continent into a vast crucible of revolutionary ideas and efforts, a tribute to the power of the creative energies of free men and women, an example to all the world that liberty and progress walk hand in hand. Let us once again awaken our American revolution until it guides the struggles of people everywhere-not with an imperialism of force or fear but the rule of courage and freedom and hope for the future of man.

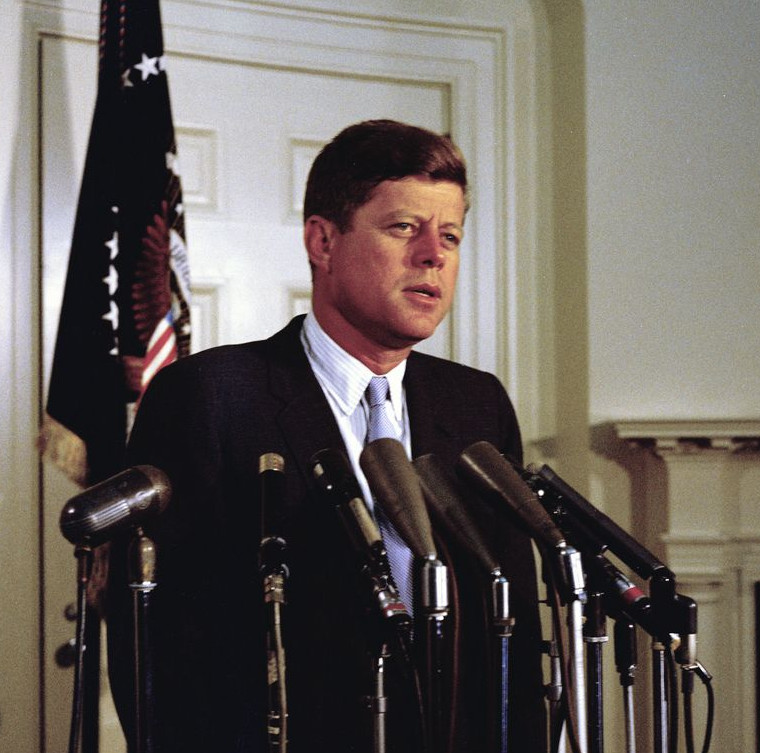
Kennedy on Punta del Este. Kennedy press conference on 2 August 1961, talking about the upcoming conference in Punta del Este. The U.S. delegation was led by Secretary of the Treasury C. Douglas Dillon.

The program was signed at an inter-American conference at Punta del Este, Uruguay, in August 1961. The charter called for reaching these targets:

- an annual increase of 2.5% in per capita income,
- the establishment of democratic governments,
- the elimination of adult illiteracy by 1970
- price stability, to avoid inflation or deflation
- more equitable income distribution, land reform, and
- economic and social planning.

First, the plan called for Latin American countries to pledge a capital investment of $80 billion over 10 years. The United States agreed to supply or guarantee $20 billion within one decade.

Second, Latin American delegates required the participating countries to draw up comprehensive plans for national development. These plans were then to be submitted for approval by an inter-American board of experts.

Third, tax codes had to be changed to demand "more from those who have most" and land reform was to be implemented.

== U.S. aid to Latin America ==
Because of the program, economic assistance to Latin America nearly tripled between fiscal year 1960 and fiscal year 1961. Between 1962 and 1967 the US supplied $1.4 billion per year to Latin America. If new investment is included, the amount of aid rose to $3.3 billion per year during this timespan while the total amount of aid was roughly $22.3 billion. However, the amount of aid did not equal the net transfer of resources and development as Latin American countries still had to pay off their debt to the US and other first world countries. Additionally, profits from the investments usually returned to the US, with profits frequently exceeding new investment.

Economic aid to Latin America dropped sharply in the late 1960s, especially when Richard Nixon entered the White House.

In March 1969, the US ambassador to the OAS, William T. Denzer, explained to the House Committee on Foreign Affairs:

When you look at net capital flows and their economic effect, and after all due credit is given to the U.S. effort to step up support to Latin America, one sees that not that much money has been put into Latin America after all."

== Business lobbying ==
The alliance charter included a clause encouraged by US policy makers that committed the Latin American governments to the promotion "of conditions that will encourage the flow of foreign investments" to the region.

U.S. industries lobbied Congress to amend the Foreign Assistance Act of 1961 to ensure that US aid would not be furnished to any foreign business that could compete with US business "unless the country concerned agrees to limit the export of the product to the US to 20 percent of output". In addition, the industries lobbied Congress to limit all purchases of AID machinery and vehicles in the US. A 1967 study of AID showed that 90 percent of all AID commodity expenditures went to US corporations.

== Reception ==
Ivan Illich advanced a "potent and highly influential critique" of the Alliance, seeing it as "bankrolled and organized by wealthy nations, foundations, and religious groups."

The journalist AJ Langguth noted that many Brazilian nationalists scorned the Alliance as Brazilian foreign aid to America due to the belief that American corporations were withdrawing more money from the country than they were investing. Though Brazil did indeed run balance of payments deficits with the United States during the years of the Alliance, the size of these deficits was well exceeded by the grants and credits provided by the US to Brazil, even before factoring development loans and military aid. Brazil also enjoyed large overall balance of payments surpluses during the Alliance years.

== Military version ==
During the Kennedy administration, between 1961 and 1963, the U.S. suspended economic and/or broke off diplomatic relations with several governments that it did not favor, including Cuba, the Dominican Republic, Ecuador, Guatemala, Honduras, and Peru. The suspensions lasted for periods of three weeks to six months.

== Rockefeller study ==
Because the perception was that the Alliance for Progress was a failure, shortly after taking office, on February 17, 1969, President Richard Nixon commissioned a study to assess the state of Latin America. Nixon appointed his most powerful political rival, New York Governor Nelson Rockefeller to direct the study. The poor relationship between the two politicians suggested that Nixon would not be that interested in the results of the study. There was a lack of interest for the region in the late 1960s to early 1970s.

In early 1969, Rockefeller and his advisors took four trips to Latin America. Most of the trips turned out to be an embarrassment. Rockefeller wrote in his report preface that,

There is general frustration over the failure to achieve a more rapid improvement in standards of living. The United States, because of its identification with the failure of the Alliance for Progress to live up to expectations, is blamed. People in the countries concerned also used our visit as an opportunity to demonstrate their frustrations with the failure of their own governments to meet their needs...demonstrations that began over grievances were taken over and exacerbated by anti-US and subversive elements which sought to weaken the United States, and their own governments in the process.

A major part of the Rockefeller report suggested a reduction of U.S. involvement, "we, in the United States, cannot determine the internal political structure of any other nation". Because there was little the United States should or could do toward changing the political atmosphere in other countries, there was no reason to attempt to use economic aid as a political tool. This was the justification to reduce economic aid in Latin America. The Rockefeller report called for some aid to continue, but the report recommended creating more effective aid programs.

== Success and failures of the plan ==
Despite some successes of the plan, its original intent was not fully realized, and its full implementation actually led to some negative effects. Growth in regional output per capita in Latin America in the 1960s was 2.6%, exceeding the Alliance for Progress goal of 2.5%. In contrast to 2.2% growth per capita in the 1950s, GDP growth rate per capita in the region reached 2.9% in the latter half of the 1960s and accelerated to 3.3% in the 1970s. Overall nine countries (including Brazil and Mexico) reached the target goal, ten nations did not reach the goal, and only Haiti had lower growth.

Adult illiteracy was reduced but not wiped out. In some countries, the number of people attending universities doubled or even tripled. Access to secondary education also showed increases. One out of every four school-age children were provided with an extra food ration. Many people were provided with new schools, textbooks, or housing.

The Alliance for Progress saw the start of long-range reform, with some improvements in land use and distribution, slightly improved tax laws and administration, the submission of detailed development programmes to the OAS, the creation of central planning agencies, and greater local efforts to provide housing, education, and financial institutions.

Health clinics were built across Latin America. However, success in improving health care was hindered by population growth.

Of the 15 million peasant families living in Latin America, only one million benefited from any kind of land reform. The traditional elites resisted any land reform.

Minimum wage laws were created but the minimum wages offered to Nicaraguan workers, for example, were set so low as to have no appreciable effect on the wages received.

The Alliance of Progress also had ties to the rise of militarization in Latin America. During the 1960s, thirteen constitutional governments in Latin America were replaced by military dictatorships. According to some authors, this was a failure of the Alliance for Progress. Indeed, U.S. military aid to some countries increased substantially as a result of the Alliance. A portion of this military aid was allocated to the School of the Americas in the Panama Canal Zone, where several future military dictators in Latin America would attend. Peter Smith wrote, "The most striking failure of the Alliance of Progress occurred within the political realm. Instead of promoting and consolidating reformist civilian rule, the 1960s witnessed a rash of military coups throughout the region...By the end of 1968 dictators were holding sway in several countries."

== Results ==
The Alliance for Progress achieved a short-lived public relations success. It also had real but limited economic advances. But by the early 1970s the program was widely viewed as a failure.

The program failed for three reasons:

- Latin American nations were unwilling to implement needed reforms, particularly in land reform.
- Kennedy's presidential successors, Lyndon B. Johnson and Richard Nixon, were less supportive of the program.
- The amount of money was not enough for the entire region: $20 billion averaged out to only $10 per Latin American.

The Organization of American States disbanded the permanent committee created to implement the alliance in 1973.

== See also ==
- Foreign Assistance Act
- Marshall Plan
- Lincoln Gordon
- Hidden Terrors
- A. J. Langguth
