= Pega Pega =

- Also known as: The Big Catch
- Genre: Telenovela; Romantic comedy
- Created by: Claudia Souto
- Directed by: Luiz Henrique Rios
- Starring: Camila Queiroz; Mateus Solano; Nanda Costa; Vanessa Giácomo; Marcos Caruso; Thiago Martins; Marcelo Serrado; Mariana Santos; João Baldasserini; Irene Ravache; Elizabeth Savalla
- Theme music composer: Rogério Vaz; Rafael Langoni Smith
- Opening theme: "A Hard Day's Night" by Skank
- Country of origin: Brazil
- Original language: Portuguese
- No. of episodes: 184 (130 international)

Production
- Production location: Rio de Janeiro
- Cinematography: João Tristão
- Editors: José Carlos Monteiro; Paulo Maia; Renato Fernandez; Rodrigo Clemente; Paulo Varasquim
- Camera setup: Multi-camera
- Running time: 41–53 minutes
- Production company: Estúdios Globo

Original release
- Network: TV Globo
- Release: 6 June 2017 – 8 January 2018

Pega Pega (English title: The Big Catch) is a Brazilian telenovela created by Claudia Souto, produced and broadcast by TV Globo. It is directed by Luiz Henrique Rios. It premiered on 6 June 2017 replacing Rock Story and ended its run on 8 January 2018, with Deus Salve o Rei replacing it.

The telenovela stars Mateus Solano, Camila Queiroz, Nanda Costa, Vanessa Giácomo, Thiago Martins, Marcelo Serrado, Mariana Santos, João Baldasserini, Elizabeth Savalla, Irene Ravache and Marcos Caruso.

The plot centers the daily routine in a luxurious Carioca Palace Hotel in Rio de Janeiro, focusing on its owner, an innocent heiress, and an ambitious businessman. All will change when a group of four friends, who are its employees, rob it and their lives are changed completely thereafter.

== Plot ==
Set in Rio de Janeiro, in the neighbourhoods of Copacabana and Tijuca, the telenovela has as its central plot as the theft of the traditional luxurious hotel, Carioca Palace and its unfolding in the life of each one of the involved ones, be they be the guests, suspects or employees. The owner, Pedrinho Guimarães (Marcos Caruso), inherited the family hotel and never saw it as a business, but as a way to spend and squander. The playboy abused all the glamour and fell on the spree, leaving aside the administration of the hotel itself. As a consequence, the Carioca was losing its prestige and, mainly, its money. On the verge of bankruptcy, Pedrinho, intending to live in the United States in the company of his butler Nelito (Rodrigo Fagundes) and granddaughter Luíza (Camila Queiroz), sells the hotel to Eric Ribeiro (Mateus Solano), one of the most respected businessmen in Brazil, but did not mention that his granddaughter, who always lived as a hotel, fell in love with Eric and suffered quietly with the sale.

Eric, a man of integrity and one of the most successful men in the country, lost his wife in a car accident and never fell in love, despite the onslaught of his personal adviser, the clumsy and ambitious Maria Pia (Mariana Santos), who does everything for him; Eric sees her only as a good friend. The businessman is the father of the fragile and troubled teenager Bebeth (Valentina Herszage), who has suffered greatly since her mother's death, living in a totally parallel world. In addition, the girl suffers from psychotic disorder and has hallucinations with her plush kangaroo, called Flora.

The crime was conceived by the cunning concierge Malagueta (Marcelo Serrado), who convinced the waiter Júlio (Thiago Martins), the receptionist Agnaldo (João Baldasserini) and the chambermaid Sandra Helena (Nanda Costa to execute the plan. At first they were hesitate, but then, faced with the limitations in the life of each of them, they come into an agreement to rob the hotel. The investigator of the case, the adventurous Antonia (Vanessa Giácomo), an incorruptible police officer, will have a challenge and go beyond unraveling the mystery – she will eventually fall in love with Júlio, the "repentant thief".

The criminal quartet, who can not spend the money to raise suspicions, continues to work normally at the Carioca Palace, hoping that the place will decree bankruptcy and that all will be dismissed.

However, Sandra Helena inherits half the fortune when Marieta, a lady who lives in the hotel, very affectionate with her, and with whom Sandra has a lot of affection, ends up dying, and Sandra Helena is free to spend the fortune without any suspicion.

== Cast ==
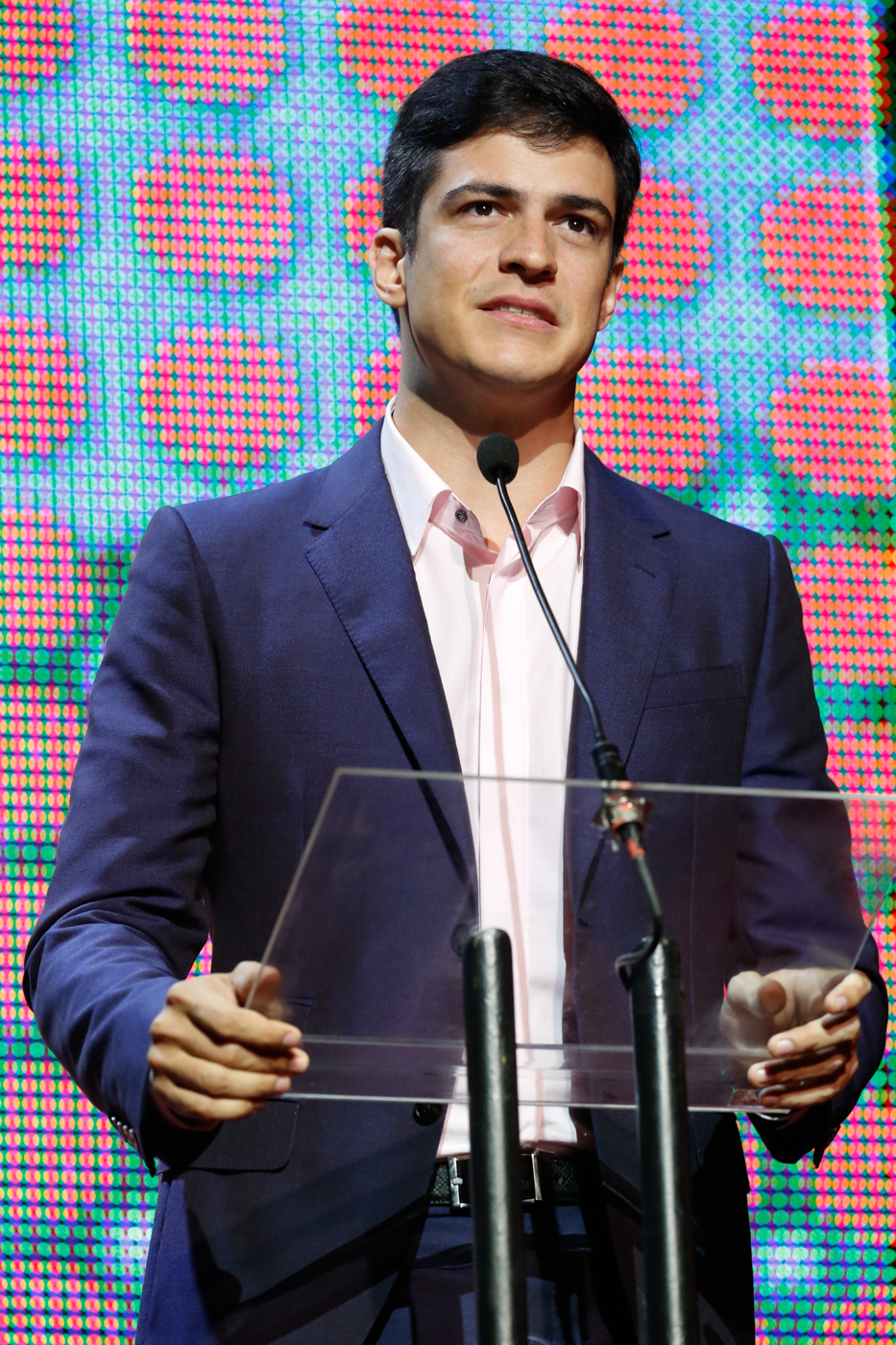
Mateus Solano (Eric)

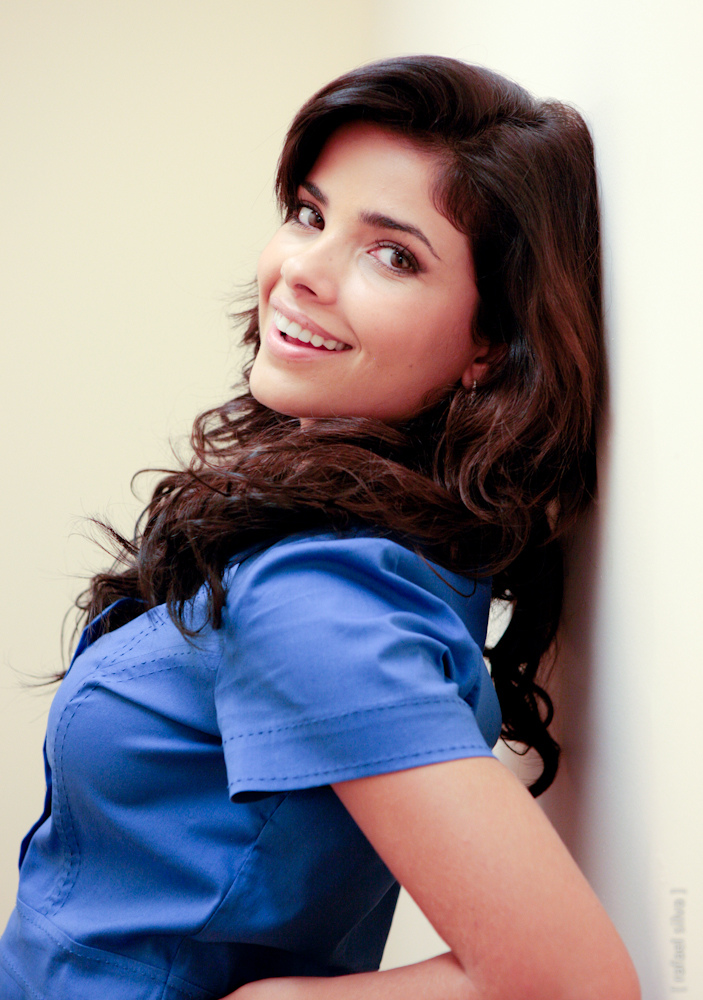
Vanessa Giácomo (Antônia)

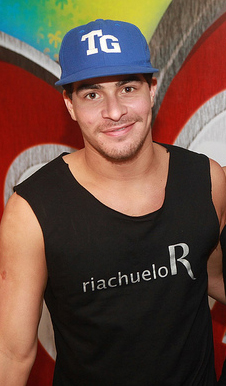
Thiago Martins (Júlio)

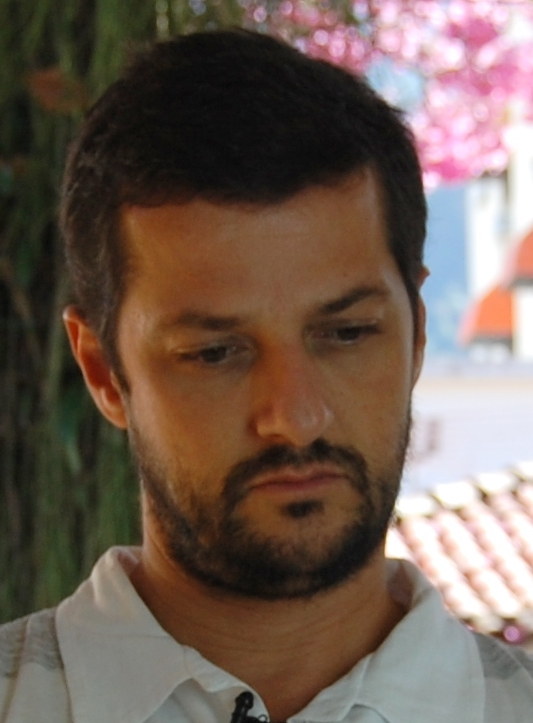
Marcelo Serrado (Malagueta)

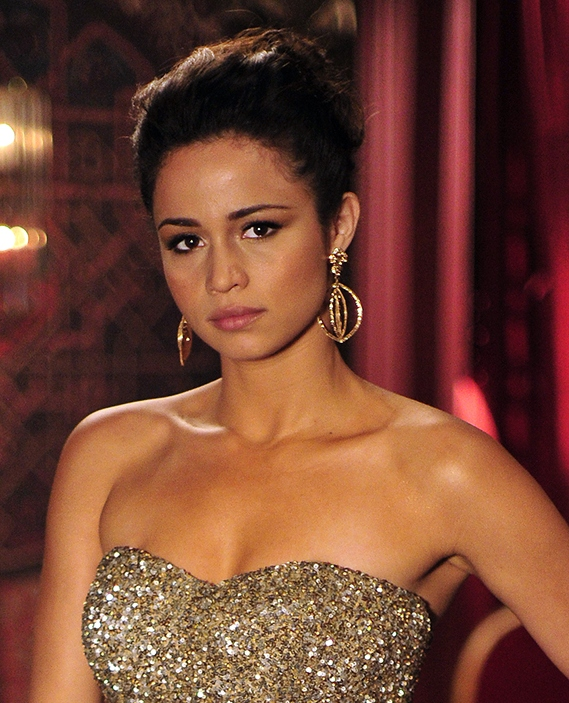
Nanda Costa (Sandra Helena)

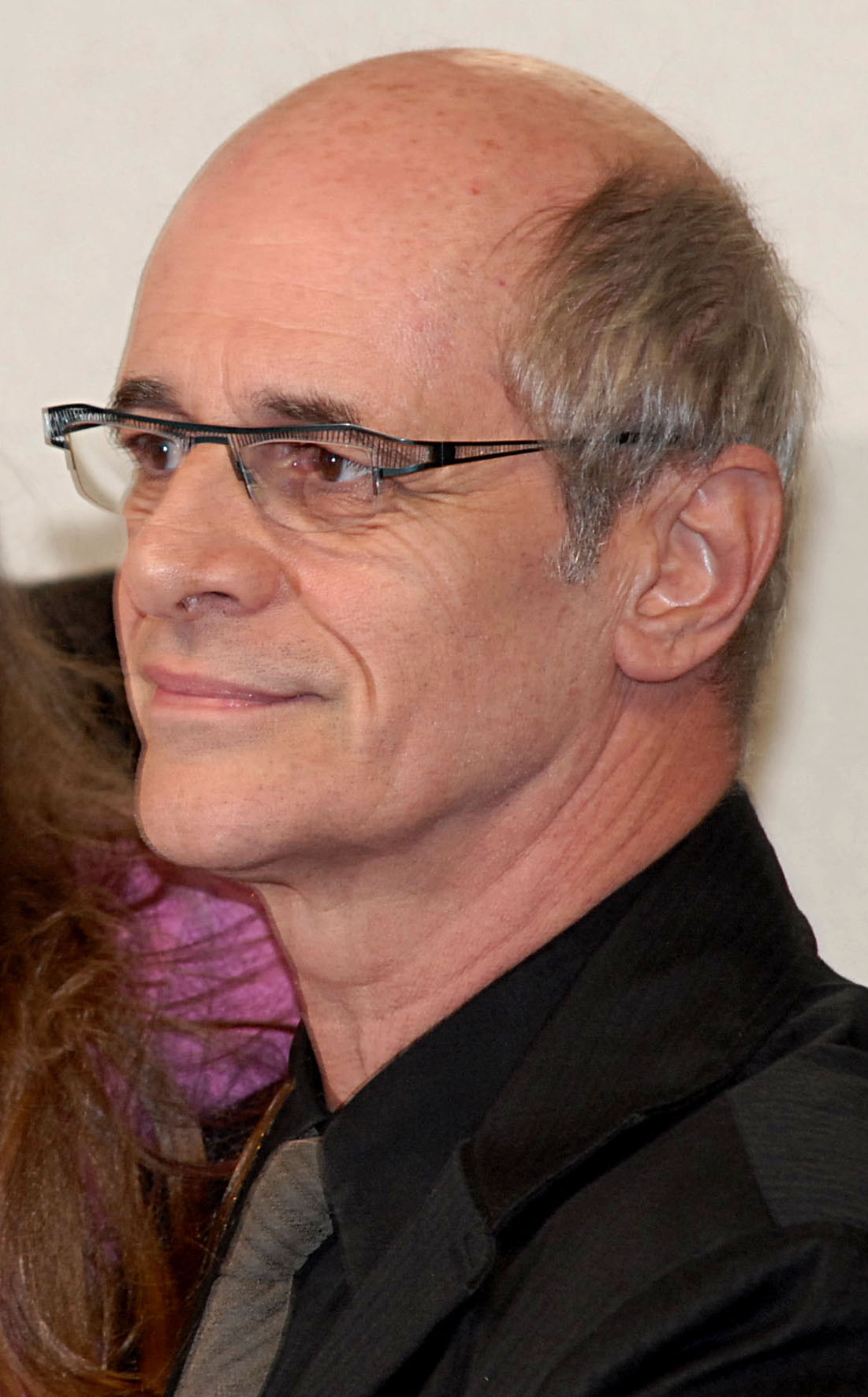
Marcos Caruso (Pedrinho)

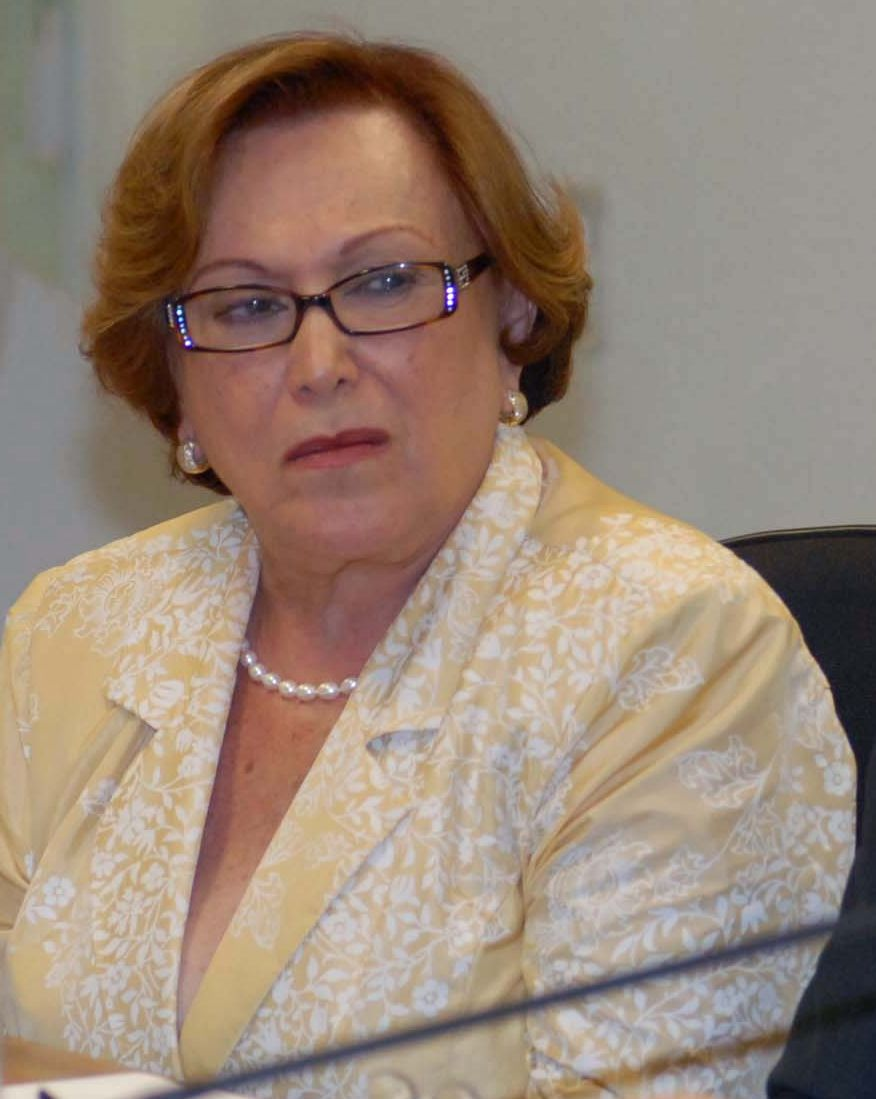
Nicette Bruno (Elza)

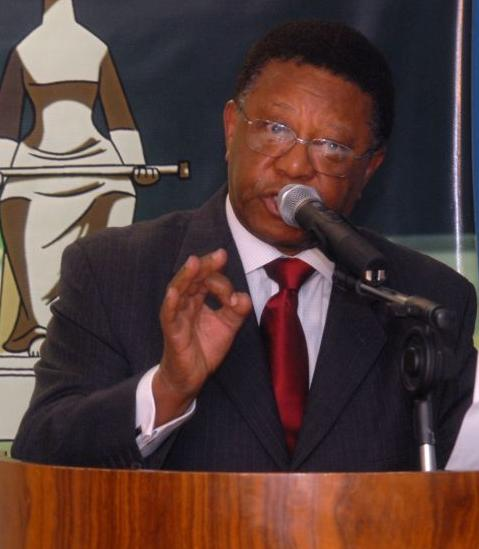
Milton Gonçalves (Cristovão)

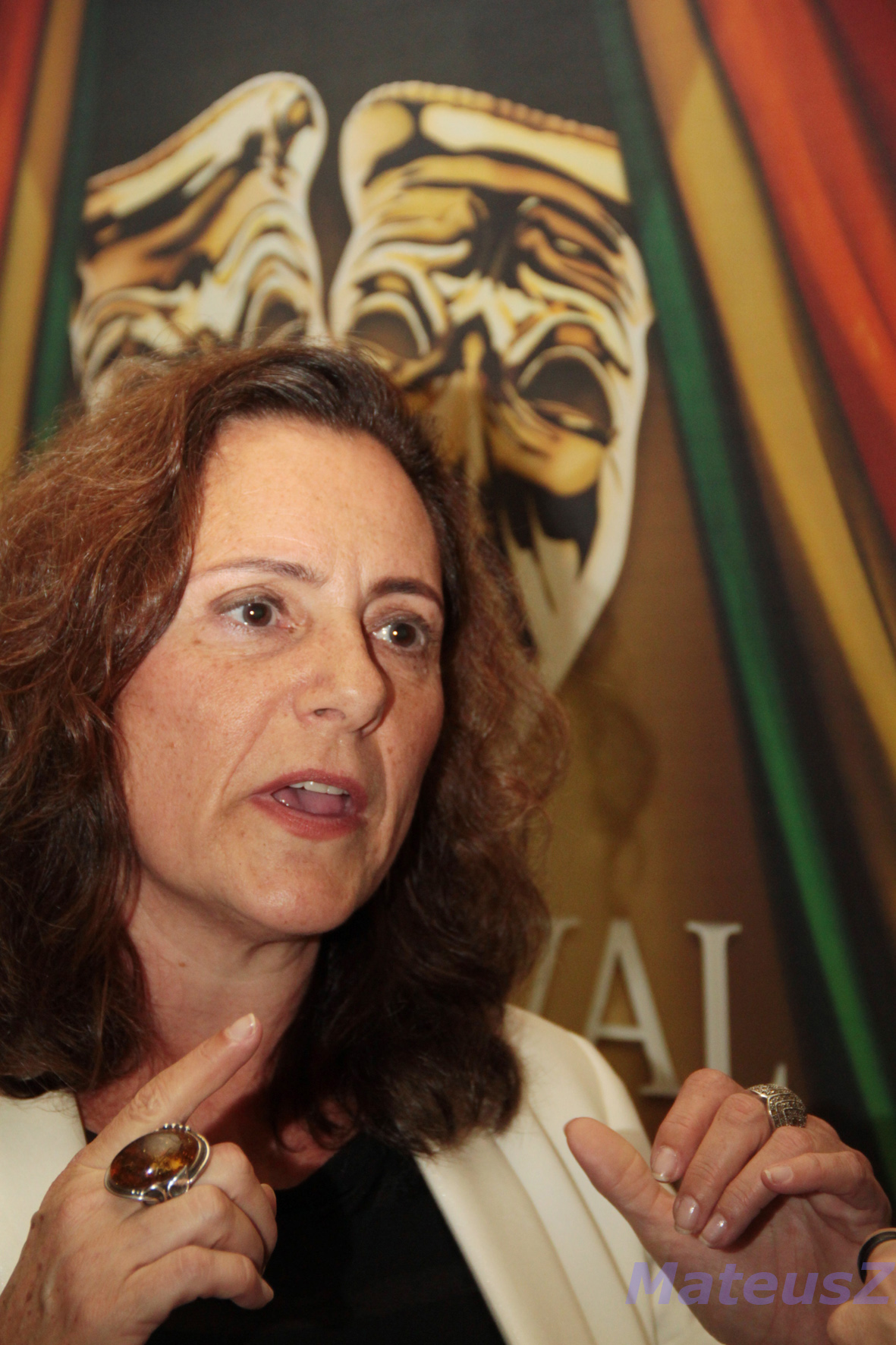
Elizabeth Savalla (Arlete)

Actor	Character
Camila Queiroz	Luíza Guimarães
Mateus Solano	Eric Ribeiro
Nanda Costa	Sandra Helena
Thiago Martins	Júlio
Vanessa Giácomo	Antônia
Marcos Caruso	Pedro Guimarães (Pedrinho)
Marcelo Serrado	Vitor Aguiar (Malagueta)
João Baldasserini	Agnaldo
Irene Ravache	Sabine Favre
Mariana Santos	Maria Pia Camargo
Marcos Veras	Domenico
Valentina Herszage	Elizabeth Ribeiro (Bebeth)
Nicette Bruno	Elza
Cristina Pereira	Maria dos Prazeres (Prazeres)
Elizabeth Savalla	Arlete
Rodrigo Fagundes	Nelito
Guilherme Weber	Douglas
Milton Gonçalves	Cristovão
Danton Mello	Borges
Dani Barros	Tereza Borges
Jaffar Bambirra	Márcio Borges
Reginaldo Faria	Athaíde Camargo
Ângela Vieira	Lígia Camargo
Paulo Vilhena	Evandro
Rômulo Neto	Lourenço
Bernardo Marinho	Wanderley
Ícaro Silva	Dílson
Marcelo Escorel	Delegado Siqueira
Márcio Kieling	Adriano
Cacá Amaral	Timóteo
Jeniffer Nascimento	Tânia
Sérgio Menezes	Sérgio
Álamo Facó	Matias
Edmilson Barros	Aníbal
Lucci Ferreira	Cássio
Thiaré Maia	Natália
Virgínia Rosa	Madalena
Pedro Cassiano	Xavier
Beto Vandesteen	Chef D’Angelo
Bruna Spínola	Cíntia
David Junior	Dom Favre
Edvana Carvalho	Dulcina
Isabela Lima	Ingrid
Rômulo Delduque	Renato
Gabriel Sanches	Rubia/Flávio
Júlia Lund	Mônica
Luís Navarro	Leonardo
Natasha Sierra	Margot
Rafhaela Castro	Gilda
Fábio Felipe	Expedito
Rodrigo Mathias	Murilo
Ana Isabela Godinho	Nina
Zecarlos Moreno	Otávio
Bruno Nunes	Elias
Regiana Antonini	Neide
Marina Rigueira	Mirella Ribeiro
Leandra Caetano	Drica
Gilberto Marmorosch	Gilmar

== Soundtrack ==
The songs that make up Pega Pega's soundtrack were announced by UOL columnist Flávio Ricco on 23 May 2017. It was also announced that the band Skank covered "A Hard Day's Night" by The Beatles would serve as an opening theme song for the telenovela. The track was released on 2 June 2017.

=== Pega Pega: Volume 1 ===
Pega Pega: Volume 1

Soundtrack album by Various artists
- Released: 2017
- Length: 56:19
- Label: Som Livre

Various artists chronology
Pega Pega: Volume 1	Pega Pega: Volume 2

No.	Title	Artist(s)	Length
1.	"A Hard Day's Night"	Skank	2:56
2.	"Vambora"	Roberto Frejat	3:43
3.	"Now You Want Me Back"	Ina Foreman	4:10
4.	"Human"	Rag'n'Bone Man	3:20
5.	"Me Too"	Meghan Trainor	3:02
6.	"Essa Mina É Louca"	Anitta ft. Jhama	2:41
7.	"Tempo de Merino"	Pedro Luís ft. Erasmo Carlos	4:02
8.	"Se For pra Mentir"	Chico Buarque & Roberta Sá	2:58
9.	"Nervous"	Gavin James	3:36
10.	"Dengo"	Anavitória	3:57
11.	"Só Posso Dizer"	Nando Reis	3:20
12.	"Quem Sabe Isso Quer Dizer Amor"	Milton Nascimento	4:01
13.	"Tempo em Movimento"	Lulu Santos	3:23
14.	"My Baby Just Cares for Me"	Delicatessen	3:13
15.	"I Will Survive"	Gloria Gaynor	7:57
Total length:			56:19

=== Pega Pega: Volume 2 ===
Pega Pega: Volume 2

Soundtrack album by Various artists
- Released: 2017
- Label: Som Livre

Various artists chronology
Pega Pega: Volume 1	Pega Pega: Volume 2

No.	Title	Artist(s)	Length
1.	"I Put a Spell on You"	Iza
2.	"La Bicicleta"	Carlos Vives & Shakira
3.	"Beautiful Life"	Lost Frequencies ft. Sandro Cavazza
4.	"Broke my Heat in Two (Você Partiu Meu Coração"	Alma Thomas
5.	"Catch and Release"	Matt Simons
6.	"Promenons Nous Dans Le Parc"	Maria de Angelis
7.	"Sonífera Ilha"	Pato Fu
8.	"Back on the Top"	I Koko
9.	"Handle This"	Amy Ward
10.	"Cutuca"
11.	"Eu sem Você"	Monique Kessous
12.	"Recado"	Gonzaguinha & Luiza Possi
13.	"Só Hoje"	Zeca Baleiro
14.	"Torn"	James TW
15.	"Fé na Luta"	Gabriel O Pensador

== Ratings ==
Timeslot (AT)	# Eps.	Premiere		Finale		Rank	Season	Average viewership
Timeslot (AT)	# Eps.	Date	Viewers (in points)	Date	Viewers (in points)	Rank	Season	Average viewership
Monday—Saturday; 7:35 pm	184	6 June 2017	29	8 January 2018	36	TBA	2017–18	29

The premiere of Pega Pega registered a viewership rating of 28.8 points in Greater São Paulo, a high number of viewers since Cheias de Charme (2012).

Preceded by Rock Story; 9 November 2016–5 June 2017	Globo 7 p.m. timeslot telenovela 6 June 2017–8 January 2018	Succeeded by Deus Salve o Rei; 9 January 2018–30 July 2018
