= O Dia que Durou 21 Anos =

2012 film directed by Camilo Tavares

- Theatrical release poster
- Directed by: Camilo Tavares
- Written by: Camilo Tavares
- Produced by: Karla Ladeia
- Music by: Dino Vicente Musica
- Production company: Pequi Filmes
- Distributed by: Pequi Filmes
- Release dates: September 27, 2012 (Festival do Rio 2012); March 29, 2013 (Brazil)
- Running time: 77 minutes
- Country: Brazil
- Languages: Portuguese; English

O Dia que Durou 21 Anos (The Day That Lasted 21 Years) is a Brazilian documentary film directed by Camilo Tavares that shows the influence of the U.S. government in the 1964 Brazilian coup d'état. Original White House tapes with John F. Kennedy and Lyndon Johnson as well as CIA Top Secret documents reveal how the US government planned to overthrow Brazilian elected president João Goulart. The film has won three awards in international festivals cinemas, two of these in the United States and one in France.

== Synopsis ==
The 1964 Brazilian coup d'état (Portuguese: Golpe de estado no Brasil em 1964 or, more colloquially, Golpe de 64) on March 31, 1964, culminated in the overthrow of Brazilian elected President João Goulart by the Armed Forces. On April 1, 1964, the United States expressed its support to the new military regime.

The documentary explores the American involvement in the coup that culminated in a brutal dictatorship that would last for the next 21 years.

LBJ receives briefing on Brazil.
Lyndon B. Johnson receiving briefing on events in Brazil on March 31, 1964 on his Texas ranch with Undersecretary of State George Ball and Assistant Secretary for Latin America, Thomas C. Mann. Ball briefs Johnson on that status of military moves in Brazil to overthrow the government of João Goulart.

The US ambassador at the time, Lincoln Gordon, and the military attaché, Colonel Vernon A. Walters, kept in constant contact with President Lyndon B. Johnson as the crisis progressed.

== Awards ==
- St Tropez International Film Festival (France), Best Foreign Documentary: The Day That Lasted 21 Years - Camilo Tavares e Karla Ladeia
- 22° Arizona International Film Festival (USA), Special Jury Award: The Day That Lasted 21 Years - Camilo Tavares
- 29° Long Island Film Festival (USA), Long Island Special Jury Award: The Day That Lasted 21 Years - Camilo Tavares
- APCA - Associação Paulista de Críticos de Arte, Melhor Documentário do Ano, " O dia que durou 21 anos" - Camilo Tavares e Karla Ladeia

== See also ==
- Alliance for Progress
- Hidden Terrors
- Forced disappearance
- 1973 Chilean coup d'état
- Operation Condor
