= Floriano Peixoto (actor) =

Brazilian actor

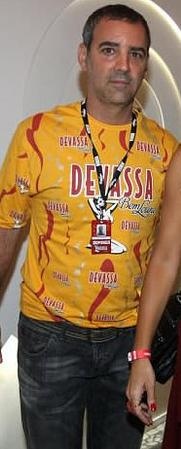
- Born: December 10, 1959 (age 66)

Floriano Peixoto Cordeiro de Farias, known as Floriano Peixoto (born December 10, 1959) is a Brazilian film and television actor from Rio de Janeiro.

In 2000 he married the actress Christine Fernandes, with whom he had a son. The two separated in early 2018.

== Career ==
=== Television ===
- 1993 Agosto - Capitão
- 1995 Explode Coração - Sarita Vitti
- 1996 Anjo de Mim - delegado Geraldo
- 1997 Por Amor - doctor
- 1998 Dona Flor e Seus Dois Maridos - Otoniel
- 1998 Pecado Capital - Ernani
- 2000 Esplendor - Frederico Berger
- 2001 Estrela-Guia - Ignácio
- 2002 Sabor da Paixão - Xavier
- 2003 Kubanacan - Bolívar
- 2005 América - Antonio Carlos
- 2005 Carandiru, Outras Histórias - Antonio Carlos
- 2006 Cidadão Brasileiro - Atílio
- 2007 Luz do Sol - William Villa Nova
- 2008 Chamas da Vida - Miguel Costa
- 2011 Rebelde - Jonas Araripe
- 2015 Os Dez Mandamentos - Hur
- 2017 Belaventura - Severo Alencastro Bourbon
- 2019 Topíssima - Paulo Roberto Mendonça

=== Film ===
- 1994 Veja Esta Canção
- 1997 A Ostra e o Vento - Roberto
- 2000 Brava Gente Brasileira - Capitão Pedro
- 2002 Madame Satã - Gregório
- 2003 Carandiru - Antônio Carlos
- 2004 Olga - Filinto Müller
