= As Frenéticas =

Brazilian girl group

- Origin: Rio de Janeiro, Rio de Janeiro, Brazil
- Genres: Pop; disco
- Years active: 1976–1984; 1992; 2001
- Members: Dhu Moraes; Edyr de Castro; Leiloca Neves; Lidoka Martuscelli; Regina Chaves; Sandra Pêra

As Frenéticas (The Frenetics) was a six-piece Brazilian girl group formed in 1976 in Rio de Janeiro, at the peak of nightclubs' success in Brazil.

== History ==
On 5 August 1976, composer and music producer Nelson Motta opened a nightclub at a shopping center in Gávea, Rio de Janeiro; it was named Frenetic Dancing Days Discotheque and was a huge success. In order to serve customers at the few tables available, he hired singer-waitresses that would perform three or four songs by surprise. Sandra Pêra (Motta's sister-in-law on behalf of her sister Marília Pêra) showed interest in the position and brought her friends Regina Chaves, Leiloca and Lidoka, who were once members of Dzi Croquettes, and singer Dhu Moraes. Suggested by the club's DJ, actress Edyr de Castro, who took part in Hair musical, completed the sextet. A repertoire of five songs was set and they had some sessions with Roberto de Carvalho, who would later marry and work with Rita Lee.

Named "As Frenéticas" after the nightclub, they started to perform for over an hour and soon left their jobs as waitresses. Their performances combined erotic clothes, humor and lyrics with energetic performances. Following the end of Motta's nightclub, As Frenéticas were hired by Warner, then recently established in Brazil. Their first single, "A Felicidade Bate à Sua Porta", by Gonzaguinha, received heavy radio airplay. Soon after, their debut album Frenéticas sold well.

In 2016, Lidoka was reported dead.

== Discography ==
=== Studio albums ===
Albums list
| Album | Details | Sales |
|---|---|---|
| Frenéticas | Release date: 9 March 1977; Format:LP; Label:Warner • Atlantic | Brazil: 500.000 |
| Caia na Gandaia | Release date: 15 May 1978; Format:LP; Label:Warner • Atlantic | Brazil: 150.000 |
| Soltas na Vida | Release date: 20 August 1979; Format:LP; Label:Warner | |
| Babando Lamartine | Release date: 20 November 1980; Format:LP; Label:Warner | |
| Diabo 4 | Release date: 23 January 1983; Format:LP; Label:Top Tape | |

=== Compilations ===
Albums list
| Album | Details | Sales |
|---|---|---|
| O Melhor de Frenéticas | Release date: 3 November 1981; Format:LP; Label:Warner | |
| As Mais Gostosas das Frenéticas | Release date: 14 January 1992; Format:CD, LP, cassette; Label:Warner | |
| Sempre Frenéticas | Release date: 4 September 1999; Format:CD; Label:Warner | |
| Pra Salvar a Terra | Release date: 21 July 2001; Format:CD; Label:Jam Music | |
| 40 Anos de Dancin' Days | Release date: 30 June 2017; Format:CD, download digital; Label:Warner | |

=== Singles ===
Singles list
| Title | Year | Album |
|---|---|---|
| "Perigosa" | 1977 | Frenéticas |
| "Tudo Bem, Tudo Bom??? Ou Mesmo Até.. (Somos as Tais Frenéticas)" | 1977 | Frenéticas |
| "Vingativa" | 1977 | Frenéticas |
| "Vida Frenética" | 1977 | Frenéticas |
| "A Felicidade Bate À Sua Porta" | 1978 | Frenéticas |
| "Dancin' Days" | 1978 | Caia na Gandaia |
| "Não Levo Nada a Sério" | 1978 | Caia na Gandaia |
| "A Noite de Lua Cheia" | 1978 | Caia na Gandaia |
| "O Preto Que Satisfaz" | 1979 | Caia na Gandaia |
| "Lesma Lerda" | 1979 | Caia na Gandaia |
| "Ouça Bem" | 1979 | Soltas na Vida |
| "Agito e Uso" | 1979 | Soltas na Vida |
| "É que Nesta Encarnação eu Nasci Manga" | 1980 | Soltas na Vida |
| "Aí! Hein!" | 1980 | Babando Lamartine |
| "Linda Morena" | 1981 | Babando Lamartine |
| "Jou Jou Balangandans" | 1981 | Babando Lamartine |
| "Tutti-Frutti (I Don't Know)" (feat. Miguel Bosé) | 1981 | Más Allá |
| "Você Escolheu Errado o Seu Super-Herói" | 1983 | Diabo 4 |
| "A Todo Vapor" | 1983 | Diabo 4 |
| "Perigosas Peruas" | 1992 | As Mais Gostosas das Frenéticas |
