= Se Nada Mais Der Certo =

2009 Brazilian drama film

- Directed by: José Eduardo Belmonte
- Written by: José Eduardo Belmonte; Luis Carlos Pacca
- Produced by: Cibele Amaral
- Starring: João Miguel; Carol Abras; Cauã Reymond; Leandra Leal; Luiza Mariani; Roberta Rodrigues; Milhem Cortaz; Adriana Lodi; Henrique Rabelo; Murilo Grossi; Tainá Müller
- Cinematography: André Lavenére
- Edited by: Frederico Ribeincher
- Music by: Zé Pedro Gollo
- Release date: 14 August 2009
- Country: Brazil
- Language: Portuguese
- Box office: $32,203

Se Nada Mais Der Certo is a 2009 Brazilian drama film directed by José Eduardo Belmonte.

== Synopsis ==
Léo is a journalist covering events for newspapers outside of São Paulo. He is in serious financial trouble, made worse by delays in getting paid. Ângela shares an apartment with Léo and has a 6-year-old son, who is practically raised by his nanny. Depressed, Ângela stays in bed for most of the day and goes out looking for fun at night. One night, Léo decides to spend the little money he has at the nightclub where Ângela goes, and meets Marcin, a trans man. Soon, they become friends and decide to drink, together with Wilson, a taxi driver who believes he needs a psychiatrist. Gradually, a strong emotional bond grows between them, which increases when they decide to play a dangerous game.

== Cast ==
- João Miguel as Wilson
- Carol Abras as Marcin
- Cauã Reymond as Léo
- Leandra Leal as Georgina
- Luiza Mariani as Ângela
- Roberta Rodrigues as Isabel
- Milhem Cortaz as Sybelle
- Adriana Lodi as Leda
- Henrique Rabelo as Lucas
- Murilo Grossi as Abílio
- Tainá Müller as Mile
