= Felizes para Sempre? =

2015 Brazilian miniseries

- Genre: Drama; Romance
- Created by: Euclydes Marinho
- Directed by: Fernando Meirelles
- Starring: Enrique Díaz; Maria Fernanda Cândido; Adriana Esteves; João Miguel; João Baldasserini; Carol Abras; Selma Egrei; Perfeito Fortuna; Paolla Oliveira; Cássia Kis Magro
- Theme music composer: Zoë Keating
- Opening theme: "Tetrishead"
- Country of origin: Brazil
- Original language: Portuguese
- No. of seasons: 1
- No. of episodes: 10

Production
- Production location: Brasília
- Running time: 15-40 minutes

Original release
- Network: Rede Globo
- Release: 26 January – 6 February 2015

Felizes para Sempre? (English: Happily Ever After?) is a Brazilian television miniseries directed by Fernando Meirelles and written by Euclydes Marinho. It aired from 26 January to 6 February 2015 on Rede Globo.

It is a remake of Quem Ama não Mata by Euclydes Marinho, and is written by himself, Angela Carneiro, Denise Bandeira and Márcia Prates, with collaborations by Bia Fonseca Corrêa do Lago. Luciano Moura, Rodrigo Meirelles, Paulo Morelli and Fernando Meirelles directed it.

== Plot ==
The series is set in Brasília and follows five couples from the same family. Dionisio (Perfeito Fortuna) and Norma Drummond (Selma Egrei) met in 1968 amidst an anti-Brazilian military dictatorship demonstration. He was a military police officer and she was a sociology student. Despite both being in opposite political sides, they fell in love and had three children: Claudio (Enrique Diaz), Hugo (João Miguel) and Joel (João Baldasserini). Dionisio is suffering from erectile dysfunction and finds himself giving in to a past affair, Olga (Cássia Kis Magro), who is visiting the city. Meanwhile, Norma is constantly being stalked by the much younger Guilherme (Antonio Sabóia), who also teaches at her university.

Cláudio is a millionaire corrupt businessman and playboy, owner of a large engineering company, and is married to Marília (Maria Fernanda Cândido), an art restorator. They both had a son, João Cláudio, who drowned in their swimming pool at the age of five, leaving them traumatized. Marília regrets it's been long since the last time she felt any pleasure with Cláudio, and he usually cheats her with several different women, usually prostitutes. One of these prostitutes is the bisexual Denise (Paolla Oliveira), who also goes by her work name Danny Bond, in reference to James Bond. She is married to Daniela (Martha Nowill), who is initially unaware of her job as a prostitute.

Hugo is a shooting sport enthusiast and engineer who suffers from alcoholism. He works at Cláudio's company, though he doesn't get along with his brother. He is married to Tânia (Adriana Esteves), a famous plastic surgeon. Contrary to Cláudio's and Marília's situation, they have too much sex and Tânia doesn't always feel like doing it. Eventually, Tânia gives in to a past passion, David (Bruno Giordano), who offers her a position as his business partner in his prestigious clinic. Hugo and Tânia have a 16-year-old son, Hugo Jr., who takes part of political demonstrations and amidst one of them, he meets Mayra (Sílvia Lourenço), an older black bloc woman who starts dating him.

Joel is the adoptive son and also works at Cláudio's office. He starts his part in the series by announcing his amicable divorce with his wife, the personal trainer Suzana (Carol Abras), but their relationship grows more difficult every day, with Joel becoming obsessed and aggressive to her and she trying to start a new life with a local farmer called Buza (Rodrigo dos Santos).

== Cast ==
- Maria Fernanda Cândido as Marília Drummond
- Enrique Díaz as Cláudio Drummond
- Paolla Oliveira as Denise / Simone / Danny Bond
- João Miguel as Hugo Drummond
- Adriana Esteves as Tânia Drummond
- João Baldasserini as Joel Drummond
- Carol Abras as Susana Drummond
- Selma Egrei as Norma Drummond
- Perfeito Fortuna as Dionísio Drummond
- Cássia Kis Magro as Olga
- Rodrigo dos Santos as Buza
- Martha Nowill as Daniela
- Matheus Fagundes as Hugo Drummond Jr., a.k.a. Júnior
- Antônio Saboia as Guilherme
- Bruno Giordano as David Rondinelli
- Christiana Ubach as Ludmila
- Bel Kowarick as Dr. Fernanda
- Mariana Loureiro as Telma
- Gero Camilo as Carlos Pavão
- Ghilherme Lobo as Dionísio (young)
- Julia Bernat as Olga (young)
- Sílvia Lourenço as Mayra
- Carlos Meceni as Dr. Bastos
- Luciléia Lopes P Felix as Background actress
- Cláudia Alencar as Alice Rondinelli
- Fafá Rennó as Virna
- Teca Pereira as Soraia
- Rodrigo Matheus as Businessman

== Episodes ==
No.	Title	Original release date	Brazil viewers (Points)
1	"Onde Colocar o Desejo?" "Where to Put Desire?"	January 26, 2015	17.0
Dionísio and Norma celebrate their 46th wedding anniversary in a party with their three sons, Cláudio, Hugo and Joel (adopted); their respective wives (Marília, Tânia and Suzana), and their only grandchild, Hugo Jr., son of Hugo and Tânia. A video with footage and testimonies by the three brothers is presented. Joel and Suzana were seen having sex just before they left for the celebration, and Joel filmed it with his cellphone. Cláudio leaves the apartment and goes to the street, where one of his affairs, Telma, demands more attention. He tells her that everything is over (despite her threats) and goes back to the party. At the dinner, Joel and Suzana announce their amicable divorce. Hugo Jr. leaves for a demonstration, where he meets Mayra, an older woman and member of a social movement. After the party, Dionísio tries to have sex with Norma but goes limp. Hugo remarks that he and Tânia have been trying to have a second child for six months, to no avail. Marília tells Cláudio that it's been long since they had a good night of sex. They try it, but Cláudio goes too fast and Marília feels nothing, strengthening her frustration. At the university, Norma is stalked by Guilherme, a much younger professor who pressures her for an affair. Marília goes alone to her couple therapy session with Dr. Fernanda and reveals that she and Cláudio haven't had a good night of sex since their 5-year old son, João Cláudio, drowned in their swimming pool. Back at home, Cláudio receives a message from Telma with a picture of her vagina, which Marília sees. Cláudio says it must have been a prank. At his office, he gives Joel a bag full of money that must handed to a man in a public park. While Joel fulfills the task, Cláudio goes to therapy with Marília. Later, Suzana talks to Buza, her new lover, but hides it from Joel. Cláudio and Marília decide to hire a prostitute to heat their relation. Looking at a website, they find Danny Bond, whom they call and later greet as she arrives at the couple's apartment, though Marília is unsure of their decision. In the name of their privacy, they identify themselves for the prostitute as "Samanta" (Marília) and "Hélio" (Cláudio).
2	"Vale a Pena Sofrer por Amor?" "Is it Worth it to Suffer Because of Love?"	January 27, 2015	16.4
Marília and Cláudio are nervous about their first ménage à trois, so Danny Bond plays a section of "Forbidden Fruit" by Nina Simone on their piano to get them relaxed. Before playing, she removes her ring and places it on the piano. She then tries to have sex with the couple, but Marília cannot deal with it and the prostitute is dismissed. Cláudio and Marília have sex anyway, but Cláudio cums too fast and Marília barely feels any pleasure.The day after, Cláudio and Joel lock themselves in a meeting room with several other businessmen to discuss a fraudulent government procurement. Hugo is furious that he was left out of the meeting and even more when he finds out Cláudio faked his signature in a suspicious change to the budget of the Transfer of the São Francisco River, a major project being carried out by Cláudio's company. Hugo announces his resignation and punches Cláudio in the face before leaving. Later, Cláudio gives Joel a bike as a payment for his part in the São Francisco Transfer deal, but Joel thinks it is too little compared to what the deal is worth. Cláudio explains Joel has been in the company for just three years, that he's got no proper education and that he still has a long way to go before aiming at higher stakes. Later, Cláudio texts Danny Bond and ask for a date - without Marília. They arrange a meeting in a local luxury hotel and have sex while Joel hopelessly waits for him with two German businessmen. Cláudio tells Joel about Danny bond, and he decides to experiment with her as well. Meanwhile, Suzana secretly sleeps over at Buza's, telling Joel that she had to go to São Paulo to take part of a sports fair. Hugo drinks at a local bar and then arrives drunk at home. The day after, he finds out Tânia is taking contraceptive pills in spite of them supposedly willing to have a second child. Dionísio talks to Cláudio about going limp with Telma and he advises his father to look for another woman just for the fun of it since he believes 46 years with the same wife drains desire away. Meanwhile, Telma, who was earlier seen receiving a book by Guilherme, goes to the address he wrote on it. However, she's unable to succumb to the temptation of cheating Dionísio. Later, Dionísio meets a past affair, Olga, who was visiting the city.
3	"Adianta Negar?" "Is There Any Use in Denying It?"	January 28, 2015	16.7
Cláudio and Danny Bond have sex one more time and start developing a more serious relationship. That night, Danny goes home where she lives with her wife Daniela, who is unaware of her real job. The day after, a man phones Danny (whose real name is revealed to be Denise), insults her and says he knows she's in Brasília. Later, when Denise talks to a friend, it is revealed that the man is a former client of Denise and that she seduced the man's wife and then dumped her, leading to her suicide. Marília finds Danny's ring on her piano and calls her to inform it. Danny says she will pass by to retrieve it. When she arrives, they start playing the piano together. Joel asks Suzana for a lift and reveals he changed his mind about divorcing her and invites her to a trip to China. Later that night, he masturbates to the video he shot when he had sex with her on the floor. She arrives, but Joel manages to hide the video. She says she is not going to China with him and he starts suspecting she has another man. The day after, he deliberately skips the couple's meeting with a lawyer to sign the divorce papers. Dionísio goes for a walk with Olga and they catch up about each other's life and then recall their relationship, including their first time in a lagoon. Hugo reluctantly asks Cláudio to return to his company after Tânia's requests. Later, he pays her a visit and tries to discuss the pills she's been taking, but she evades him and goes to a meeting with her past affair and famous doctor David Rondinelli, who offers her a position as his business partner at his clinic. That night, she, Hugo, David, and the latter's wife have dinner to celebrate Tânia's new job. During the meal, she secretly rubs her leg at David's under the table. The next night, they have sex, though Tânia is as unexcited with him as she normally is with Hugo. David drives her to the parking lot where she left her car, and ends up hitting a person in the process. He attempts to help her, but Tãnia calls him back and orders him to abandon the dying woman, unwilling to be involved in such a scandal.
4	"Quem Precisa Desse Amor?" "Who Needs This Love?"	January 29, 2015	17.3
Denise pays Cláudio a surprise visit at his company and asks for a helicopter ride. Cláudio is mad that she went to his office, but Denise seduces him into it and reveals another supposedly real name of hers: Simone. Denise later pays Marília a visit at her atelier and they go have lunch together. When they get back to Marília's house, they reveal their real names to each other (Denise says "Denise", instead of "Simone" like she did with Cláudio). Tânia is traumatized by the running over incident of the night before and her hand shivers as she is about to perform a surgery. David informs her that the woman died and was a 52-year-old maid, and then drives Tânia to a precinct in order for them to confess the crime. Tânia tells him that she will take no responsibility since the car is his and it was him who was driving it, so he just takes off and gives up. Hugo is suspicious of he and Tânia's incapability of having another child and decides to have his semen analyzed. His doctor says he has no spermatozoons and is thus unable to have children, and now Hugo has reasons to believe Hugo Jr. is not his true son. Joel keeps pressuring Suzana not to carry on with their divorce and misses another appointment with their lawyer. He eventually hires a detective and has he stalk her. The guy later informs him of Suzana's affair with Buza and gives him his address. Joel goes there and finds them hooking up. The day after, he beats Suzana up and is held by bystanders.
5	"Aqui se Faz, Aqui se Paga?" "What Goes Around Comes Around?"	January 30, 2015	16.4
Cláudio is questioned by journalists as he and Marília leave a restaurant and Marília questions him about the reason the press has been talking about him so much lately. Cláudio prints and takes home a list of people who collaborated with him in his deals and a list of more than a thousand works of art that he had Marília inadvertently sign as if they were hers. As he leaves his office, he is surrounded by protesters. He calls Denise and asks for a date, but she sends a friend of hers as a replacement and goes to Marília's atelier. She asks Marília out and takes her to a trampoline, where she dopes her and makes out with her. As they arrive at Marília's, she tells Denise they should stop with their relationship. Dionísio has lunch with Cláudio and pressures him to reveal more information about the scandal involving his company, but Cláudio avoids the subject and has his father focus his attention on Joel, informing him of his assault on her. Suzana goes to the courts and manages to have Joel ordered to keep a 50-meter distance from her. He hires a man to steal her car and then has it all unset. he gives her the address to where the remains of the car is and stands far from her, respecting the legal limit. He then texts her some messages offering another (and better) car, but she refuses and leave. David fires Tânia over her attempt to escape any justice from their crime. Hugo runs a parental test and confirms that Hugo Jr. isn't his son. João Flávio, the man who's been making threats to Denise, goes to the hotel she normally takes her clients to and asks the receptionist, a friend of Denise, for information about the prostitute.
6	"O Passado nos Condena?" "The Past Condemns Us?"	February 2, 2015	19.6
Danny and Marília have dinner and Denise announces she might have to leave Brasília. They make sex one more time. While Marília sleeps, Denise photographs Cláudio's incriminating documents. She also takes a dossier that proves more than a thousand works of art were bought in Maria's name. Denise investigates Cláudio's documents and then send them to a large number of e-mails. Later, she is seen with Marília in an LGBT nightclub. They leave the place for a motel. The João Flávio, the man whose wife killed herself because of Denise, makes more threats and she asks Cláudio for help. When she is having a milkshake with Marília, he says he has spotted her while Marília is in the toilet and Danny flees. She manages to lose him, and Marília picks up Danny's cellphone she forgot on the table. Hugo confronts Tânia over not being the true father of Hugo Jr. Eventually she reveals she drank too much in a party when he was away at a shooting competition and made out with Zé Umberto, a former college colleague. Hugo Jr. and Maria take part of a massive demonstration against Claudio's company where she teaches him how to anonymously cause degradation. Later, he has his first time with her. Hugo pays Zé Umberto a visit and finds out the doctor is homosexual, and therefore unlikely to be the true father of Júnior. Disappointed with Tânia's lies, he leaves home. Suzana tries to enter her house but finds out Joel has changed the locks. Dionísio confronts Joel over beating Suzana and says he's ashamed of him. Joel has someone deliver Tânia's ripped clothes at Buza's. Dionísio and Olga go to the same lake where they had their first time 50 years ago and have sex one more time.
7	"Filhos, Melhor Não Tê-los?" "Children, Best Not to Have Them?"	February 3, 2015	16.6
Cláudio has one of his men kidnap the cowboy and executes him in the outskirts of the city. As a thanksgiving, Danny and three of her friends arrange an afternoon of sex for him. Later, Danny's wife finds out about her job and Danny unworriedly leaves her. Suzana tells Buza she is pregnant. Joel finds out and suspects the child is his. He sends her a message, which Buza reads first. Buza then becomes disappointed at Suzana due to the possibility of the child not being his. During a walk with Olga, Dionisio suffers a heart attack and is rushed to the hospital. There, Hugo announces he is leaving home and Norma invites him to move back to her house. Hugo Jr. is arrested after being identified as one of the aggressive protesters, and Hugo asks Claudio to have him released via a phone call to the local sheriff, his friend. Hugo Jr. refuses to thank his uncle and leaves in Mayra's bike, showing Cláudio the finger. Later, Hugo reveals to his son that he's not his true father and the boy says he's going to leave home if Tânia doesn't say who is his real father. Seeing no other escape, she reveals that the father is Cláudio.
8	"Quem Ama não Trai?" "Don't the Ones Who Love Cheat?"	February 4, 2015	13.9
Hugo causes damage in Cláudio's office over his past betrayal. Meanwhile, Tânia reveals to Cláudio that Júnior is his son. Cláudio arrogantly says he has nothing to do with it. When Dionísio is back at home, Norma expels Tânia over her betrayal when she attempts to talk to her son. Later, during a surgery, she succumbs to her stressful situation and makes a mistake, hitting a vital spot of her patient. Joel prepares a video in which Suzana is seen having sex with him, though he artificially hides his face in it.
9	"Afinal, o Crime Compensa ou Não?" "After All, Does Crime Pay or Not?"	February 5, 2015	16.6
Hugo tells Marília that Júnior is Cláuido's son and she cries. She then tells Cláudio she's going to divorce him at a high cost. Hugo breaks into Cláudio's office and shoots him in the ear with a silenced pistol, threatening to shoot the other if he doesn't speak to Júnior. He does as his brother asked, but Hugo Jr. says there will be no relation between them and Cláudio will be arrested over his involvement with corrupt politicians. Joel is seen e-mailing the federal police the files Denise photographed. Cláudio tries to fly to Paris with her, but has his passport confiscated. Later, at home, he and Marília are called by the police to testify. Cláudio arranges a meeting between him, her and his lawyer to settle their divorce. She goes to the toilet and finds Denise's ring on the sink and becomes devastated over Denise's betrayal. Hugo, who accompanied her, tells her that they should talk to his friend, a journalist, and say everything they know. The patient Tânia was working on earlier dies. As a result, all her next clients cancel their surgeries. Hugo Jr. sleeps over at Mayra's, but she warns him that he will not be able to live there. Later, Tânia tries to talk to her son, but he refuses and leaves. She then goes for him at Dionisio and Norma's house, but Norma doesn't let her in. Joel posts the video of Suzana having sex with him on the internet. Buza is informed of this and tries to beat him up, but ends up getting beaten instead. Later, it is revealed that Joel promised an apartment to Denise if she gave him the files. She tries to ask for her part on the deal, but he says the dossier about Marília's works of art is missing, much to her disappointment. She later says she's not doing anything else for him, but he sends her a video of her hooking up with Cláudio and threatens to show it to Marília. Olga pays Norma a visit and tries to talk to her, but Norma denies. Later, Dionisio talks to Olga and explains he is not willing to leave Norma for her. Olga says she understands and leaves, succumbing to tears later. At university at night, Norma follows Guilherme and finds him hooking up with another professor, unbeknownst to them. She leaves, frustrated. A major magazine publishes an interview with revelations by Marília. Joel celebrates and Cláudio says he's going to kill her.
10	"Quem Ama não Mata?" "Don't the Ones Who Love Kill?"	February 6, 2015	19.4
Joel agrees to have his account in Antiqua used by Cláudio to transfer all his illegal money, some R$ 58 million. He then takes some drugs and, under the influence, rides to Buza's and allucinantingly tries to grab hold of Suzana. Buza helps her, and soon after she gives him a DNA exam which will reveal who is her son's real father. Buza tears the exam apart and says it won't make a difference who the father is. Dionisio tells Norma of his betrayal and asks her to forgive him, but she just leaves for her university. There, she goes after Guilherme, but as soon as she starts speaking to him, she is informed that Dionisio was found laying dead at home. At his funeral, a gun is placed on his body as he requested in life. Hugo Jr. goes to Mayra's and finds out she's involved with some guy that pays her good money in exchange of sex, money that she uses for the movements. As he leaves, he is informed that his grandfather died. After several attempts, Hugo manages to reach for his son, who arrives at the cemetery. Still at the funeral, Cláudio is informed that police will arrest him and Marília that afternoon. Denise gets a hold of her laptop with the images of her having sex with Cláudio and Marília and drops it on a river. She also dumps all her prostitute clothes and wigs. Joel calls her just afterwards and reveals he has backups of the files. She demands a negotiation. Back at the cemitary, Joel threatens Denise one more time and after she refuses to give him the dossier, he sends Cláudio and Marília the files. Cláudio takes the gun from his father's body and heads for Denise. Marília goes to Hugo's car where she also grabs a gun and goes after the prostitute. Denise takes Joel inside her car, where she shows him the dossier but takes it back at gunpoint, demanding him to leave. Someone shoots her dead in the head and she falls off the car. Joel makes a run for it and Marília kneels down by Denise's body. Cláudio attempts to execute his ex-wife from behind, but police arrive and arrest both. At home, Norma re-watches the video shown in the first episode. While jogging, Tânia is informed that police officers want to interrogate her over the death of the woman she and David ran over days ago. She puts the phone down and continues jogging.

== Production ==
Marinho originally wanted to set the story in Niterói, but Meirelles convinced him to change it to Brazilian capital Brasília. There, places such as the Jardim Botânico de Brasília, the City Park Dona Sarah Kubitschek, University of Brasília, Praça dos Cristais, Itamaraty Palace, Palácio da Alvorada, Justice Palace and the Chapada dos Veadeiros National Park. Banker Edemar Cid Ferreira's house was used as Tânia's clinic. The characters' names are a tribute to the actors who worked at the original series.

== Reception ==
The story full of sex scenes with actress Paolla Oliveira made a splash on the internet. On Twitter, seven terms related to ‘Happily Ever After?’ entered the Trending Topics in Brazil, among them #felizesparasempre (original title), #ripdannybond (in reference to the actress's character) and #obrigadoadrianaesteves (reference to actress Adriana Esteves, who played Carminha in Brazil Avenue). The miniseries aired on Globo's 11:00 pm time slot in Brazil, obtaining a 39% share and more than 17 million viewers.
