= Brave New Land =

2000 film directed by Lúcia Murat

- Theatrical release poster
- Directed by: Lúcia Murat
- Written by: Lúcia Murat
- Produced by: Cristina Aché; Lúcia Murat
- Starring: Diogo Infante; Floriano Peixoto; Luciana Rigueira; Leonardo Villar
- Cinematography: Antonio Luiz Mendes
- Edited by: Cezar Migliorin; Mair Tavares
- Music by: Livio Trachtenberg
- Production company: Taiga Filmes
- Distributed by: Riofilme
- Release dates: 7 September 2000 (Toronto); November 2000
- Running time: 104 minutes
- Country: Brazil
- Language: Portuguese
- Budget: R$1.4 million
- Box office: R$102,507

Brave New Land (Portuguese: Brava Gente Brasileira) is a 2000 Brazilian drama film written and directed by Lúcia Murat. The title comes from a line from the chorus refrain written by journalist Evaristo da Veiga for the Brazilian Independence Anthem. It depicts the conflicted relationship between Portuguese, Spanish and Indigenous in the 18th century.

== Cast ==
- Diogo Infante as Diogo de Castro e Albuquerque
- Floriano Peixoto as Captain Pedro
- Luciana Rigueira as Ánote
- Leonardo Villar as Commander
- Buza Ferraz as Antônio
- Murilo Grossi as Alfonso
- Sérgio Mamberti as priest

== Production ==
In the late 1980s, Murat knew the history about the conflict between Indigenous people and military in the New Coimbra Fort, a fort of the Western Military Command in the Pantanal of Mato Grosso do Sul. And, in 1997, when a producer asked her about the planning of any film she remembered the story. She first visited the Kadiweu people in April 1997, and the shooting took place in seven weeks in a set in Bonito, Mato Grosso do Sul in 1999.

== Reception ==
It was first screened at the 2000 Toronto International Film Festival and O Estado de S. Paulo reported it received praise from critics. However, Derek Elley from Variety criticized it for its clichés, calling it "solidly conventional behind its verismo front". Elley said "Budgetary constraints hamper what little drama is happening onscreen, and only actor to make much of an impression is Leonardo Villar as the fort's gnarled, pragmatic commander." In spite of it, the film won Best Actress Award (Rigueira) and Best Score Award at the Festival de Brasília.
