= Blue Blood (2014 film) =

2014 film

- Film poster
- Directed by: Lírio Ferreira
- Written by: Fellipe Barbosa; Lírio Ferreira
- Starring: Daniel de Oliveira
- Release date: 25 July 2014
- Running time: 87 minutes
- Countries: Brazil; Macau
- Language: Portuguese

Blue Blood (Portuguese: Sangue azul) is a 2014 Brazilian drama film directed by Lírio Ferreira. It was screened in the Panorama section of the 65th Berlin International Film Festival.

== Cast ==
- Daniel de Oliveira
- Caroline Abras
- Sandra Coverloni
- Rômulo Braga
