= Edyr de Castro =

Brazilian actress and singer (1946–2019)

Edyr de Castro (2 September 1946 – 15 January 2019) was a Brazilian actress and singer. She initially signed her original name, but later took on the stage name Edyr Duqui.

She was one of the members of the vocal group As Frenéticas, and was also member of the group Mucamas do Painho, derived from her participation in the program Chico Anysio Show.

She was married to singer and composer Zé Rodrix.

== Works ==
=== Television ===
- 2009 - Poder Paralelo - Rosa Nunes
- 2007 - Amor e Intrigas - Donata
- 2007 - Sete Pecados - saleswoman of a stand near the school
- 2006 - Sinhá Moça - Ruth
- 2004 - Cabocla - Maria
- 2003 - Agora É que São Elas - Guadalupe
- 2000 - A turma do Pererê
- 1997 - Por Amor - Elvira
- 1992 - Anos Rebeldes
- 1985 - Roque Santeiro - Nininha
- 1976 - Escrava Isaura - Ana

=== Film ===
- 2006 - Forbidden to Forbid - Rosalinda
- 2002 - Something in the Air - Neusa
- 1996 - The Barber of Rio - Patricia

=== Theater ===
- 1969 – Hair

== See also ==
- Brazilian television
- Música popular brasileira
