= Eterna Magia =

- Genre: Telenovela
- Created by: Elizabeth Jhin
- Written by: Eliane Garcia; Fernando Rebello; Lílian Garcia; Júlio Fischer
- Directed by: Ulysses Cruz; Carlos Manga
- Starring: Malu Mader; Thiago Lacerda; Maria Flor; Werner Schunemann; Eliane Giardini; Cássia Kis; Luís Melo; Irene Ravache
- Opening theme: "Pot-Pourri" by Alberto Rosenblit (1st phase); "Nada Além" by Sidney Magal (2nd phase)
- Country of origin: Brazil
- Original language: Portuguese
- No. of episodes: 148

Production
- Camera setup: Multi-camera

Original release
- Network: TV Globo
- Release: 14 May – 2 November 2007

Eterna Magia is a Brazilian telenovela produced and broadcast by TV Globo. It premiered on 14 May 2007, replacing O Profeta, and ended on 2 November 2007, replaced by Desejo Proibido. The series is written by Elizabeth Jhin, with the collaboration of Eliane Garcia, Fernando Rebello, Lílian Garcia, and Júlio Fischer.

It stars Malu Mader, Thiago Lacerda, Maria Flor, Werner Schunemann, Eliane Giardini, Cássia Kis, Luís Melo, and Irene Ravache.

== Cast ==
- Malu Mader as Eva O'Brian Sullivan
- Thiago Lacerda as Conrado O'Neill
- Maria Flor as Marina "Nina" Rosa O'Brian Sullivan O'Neill
- Cássia Kis as Zilda Pelizari
- Anna Rita Cerqueira as Clara Sullivan O'Neill
- Eliane Giardini as Pérola O'Brian Sullivan
- Werner Schunemann as Maximillian "Max" Sullivan
- Irene Ravache as Loreta O'Neill
- Milena Toscano as Elisa Pelizari
- Cauã Reymond as Lucas Finnegan
- Thiago Rodrigues as Flávio Falcão / Ebdimon
- Luís Melo as Dr. Rafael Pelizari
- Osmar Prado as Joaquim O'Neill
- Aracy Balabanian as Inácia Finnegan
- Cleyde Yáconis as Dona Chica
- Rita Guedes as Matilde Sotero O'Neill
- Chris Couto as Eglantina Adams
- Pierre Kiwitt as Peter Gallagher
- Paulo Coelho as Mago Simon
- Bel Kutner as Roberta "Bertha" Fontes
- Isabelle Drummond as Angelina "Gina" Ferreira O'Neill
- Lara Rodrigues as Tereza "Teca" Ferreira O'Neill
- Thiago de Los Reyes as Bruno Finnegan
- Ana Carolina Godóy as Maria Carolina "Carol" O'Neill
- Marco Pigossi as Miguel Finnegan
- Tainá Müller as Laura Mascarenhas
- Emiliano Queiroz as Padre Agnaldo
- Isaac Bardavid as José Carlos "Zequinha" Finnegan
- Lívia Falcão as Flora O'Ryen
- Carl Schumacher as Carlos "Carlão" O'Ryen
- Daniel Erthal as Nicolau Betti
- Maurício Gonçalves as José Antônio "Padre Zuza"
- Nizo Neto as Brasil
- Eduardo Mancini as Gonzaga
- Marcelo Saback as Jair Ferreira
- Bia Sion as Evelyn
- Miryam Thereza as Tia Edméia
- Beatriz Tragtenberg as Tia Neném
- Nica Bonfim as Sofia
- Marcela Rosis as Nora
- Caetano O'Maihlan as Oscar
- Marc Franken as Bento
- Fernanda Biancamanno as Célia "Celinha" O'Ryen
- Pedro Garcia Netto as Bernardo
- Fábio Keldani as Mauro
- Marcella Valente as Joyce
- Cláudio Andrade as William
- Maria Clara Mattos as Rita
- Rodrigo Guimarães as Jonathan
- Rogério Faria as Antônio
- Vivian Pimentel as Molly
- Rick Garcia as Tomás
- Izak Dahora as Tadeu
- Rafael Ritto as Severino O'Ryen
- Júlia Oliva as Aninha
- Guillermo Hundadze as Joaquim O'Neill Ferreira "Qunizinho"

== Reception ==
=== Awards and nominations ===
Year	Award	Category	Nominated	Result	Ref.
2008	International Emmy Awards	Best Actress	Irene Ravache	Nominated	
