= Maria Flor =

Brazilian actress (born 1983)

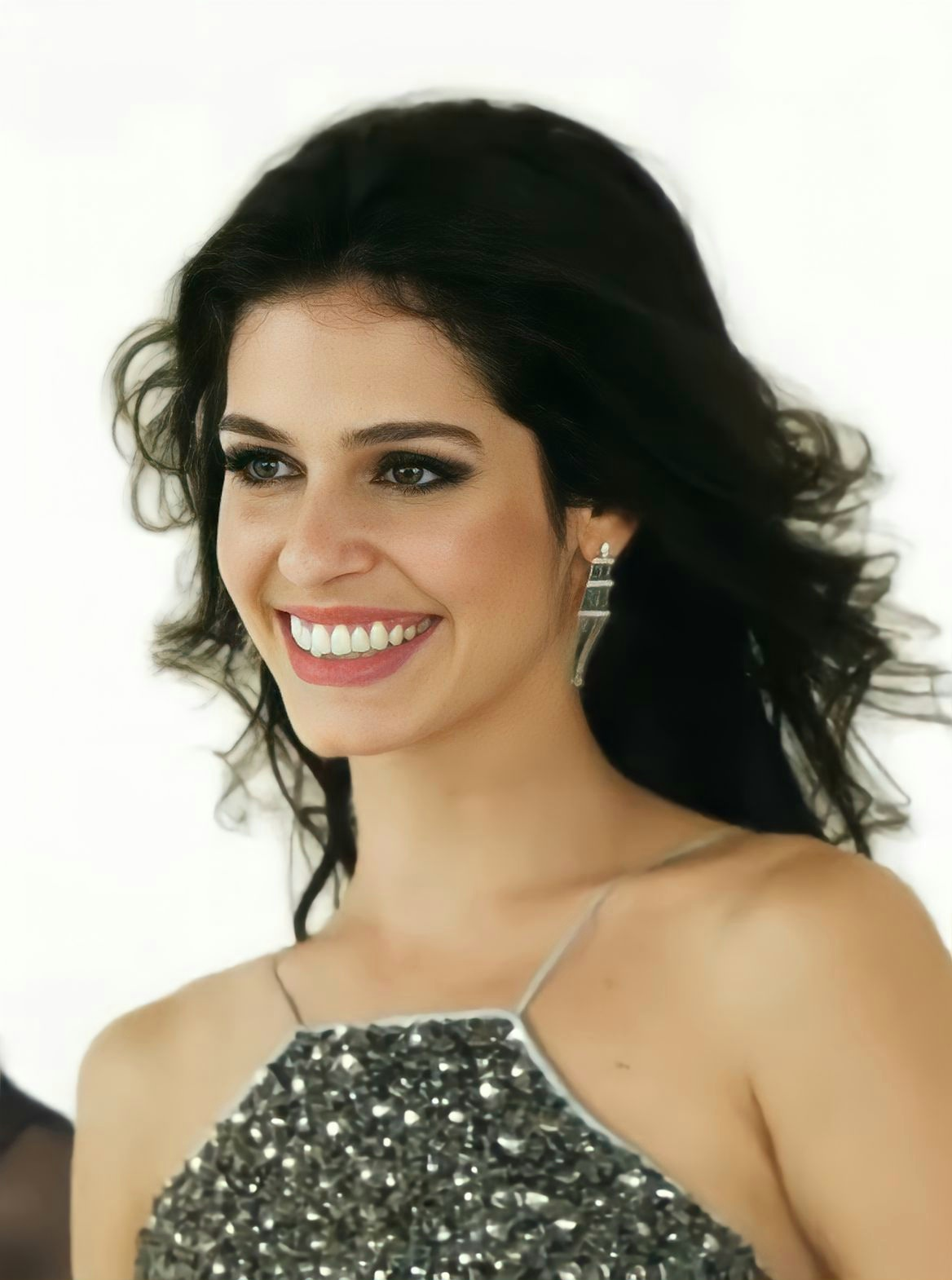
- Maria Flor in 2012
- Born: Maria Flor Leite Calaça; 31 August 1983 (age 42); Rio de Janeiro, Brazil
- Occupation: Actress

Maria Flor Leite Calaça (born 31 August 1983), usually known as Maria Flor, is a Brazilian actress.

== Career ==
She was discovered in 2002, and her first role was in the film O Diabo a Quatro, filmed in the same year, and released nationwide in Brazil in 2005. It was also her first role as a protagonist in a movie. She became famous after her role as Rê, a very insecure and innovative character, in Malhação telenovela. This was also her first television role.

She played Tina, a romantic character, in the telenovela Cabocla. To be able to play her character, Maria Flor spent almost a month in a farm learning how to be a peasant. In the movie Cazuza - O Tempo Não Pára she played a groupie following the rock band Barão Vermelho. In the film Quase Dois Irmãos she played a wealthy girl, daughter of a politician, and that gets involved with a drug dealer. She also represented the cast of the film during the 2005 Créteil International Women's Film Festival.

She played a sex-worker in the movie O Diabo a Quatro. In her research to play this character she talked to real-life sex-workers. Maria Flor won the best actress award of the Festival de Cuiabá (Cuiabá Film Festival) for her performance in this film. In the biographical film Dois Filhos de Francisco, Maria Flor played Solange, who was the first love of the sertanejo singer Zezé Di Camargo, of the Zezé Di Camargo & Luciano duo.

She played Taís Junqueira in the telenovela Belíssima, which started airing in November, 2005. Taís Junqueira is a Brazilian woman working in Greece as a prostitute, after receiving a proposal promising her a job as a ballerina. During the telenovela, her character tried to return to Brazil. In 2006, she played Carol in the 2006 film Podecre! and Letícia in the movie Proibido Proibir.

Maria Flor played the role of Bel in the 2007 film The Ballroom Her first role as the main character of a telenovela was in the 2007 telenovela Eterna Magia, where she played the role of Nina Sullivan, who is a witch who refuses to use her magical abilities. In 2008, she participated of one episode of the TV series Casos e Acasos, and starred the end of the year special Aline.

Her international career started in the Fernando Meirelles film 360, starring Anthony Hopkins, Rachel Weisz and Jude Law.

Besides working as an actress, Maria Flor starred the summer campaign for Blue Man, a bikini and bermuda shorts factory.

== Personal life ==
Maria Flor was born in Laranjeiras, Rio de Janeiro. She is the daughter of Renato Calaça, a cinema audio technician and Márcia Leite, who is a screenwriter.

== Filmography ==
Year	Title	Role	Notes
1995	Malhação	Nininha Marques Macieira	Telenovela
2003	Malhação	Rê	Telenovela
2004	Cabocla	Tina	Telenovela
2004	Cazuza - O Tempo Não Pára	Unnamed girl	Film
2004	Quase Dois Irmãos	Juliana	Film
2005	O Diabo a Quatro¹	Rita de Cássia	Film
2005	Dois Filhos de Francisco	Solange	Film
2005	Belíssima	Taís Junqueira	Telenovela
2006	Podecre!	Carol	Film
2006	Proibido Proibir	Letícia	Film
2007	The Ballroom	Bel	Film
2007	Eterna Magia	Nina Sullivan	Telenovela
2008	Casos e Acasos	Fernanda	TV series
2008	Aline	Aline	TV special
2009	Som & Fúria	Kátia	Miniseries
2009-2011	Aline	Aline	TV series
2010	Quincas Berro D'Água		Film
2010	O Bem Amado	Violeta	Film and 2011 Miniseries
2012	As Brasileiras	Shirley	TV series
2012	360	Laura	Film
2012	Xingu	Marina	Film
2012	Do Amor	Lulu	TV series
2012	A Grande Família	Juliana Rebouças	TV series
2014	O Rebu	Camila	Telenovela
2015	Sete Vidas	Taís	Telenovela
2016	A Lei do Amor	Flávia	Telenovela
2016	Little Secret	Jeanne	Film
2018	3%	Samira	Television series
2024–present	Garota do Momento	Anita	Telenovela
