= Lúcia Murat =

Brazilian filmmaker

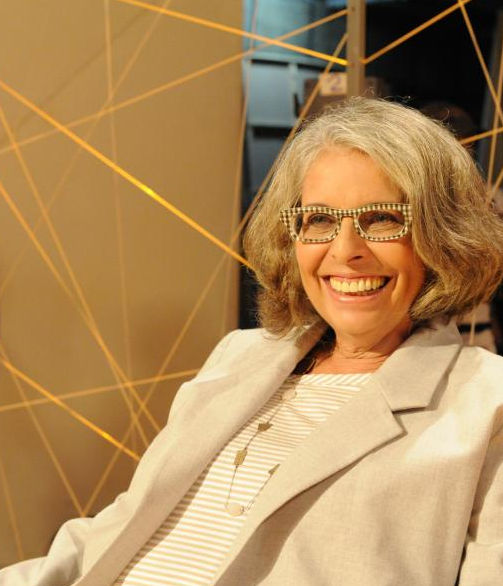
- Born: 1949; Rio de Janeiro, Brazil
- Occupation: Film director

Lúcia Murat (born 1949) is a Brazilian filmmaker.

Murat participated in the student and guerrilla movements against the military dictatorship in Brazil in the 1960–1970s. She was imprisoned and tortured by military agents; that experience exerted a strong influence on her work. Murat worked as a journalist for newspapers like Jornal do Brasil and O Globo before becoming a film director.

Her feature film Que Bom Te Ver Viva is a compendium of stories and memories of her and other political prisoners. In 2004, she returned to the theme with Quase Dois Irmãos, winning the Best Ibero-American Film Award at the Mar del Plata Festival.

In 2011, Murat won several prizes at the Gramado Festival with the film A Long Journey.

== Filmography ==
- O Pequeno Exército Louco (1984)
- Que Bom Te Ver Viva (1989)
- Oswaldianas (1992) (segment "Daisy das Almas Deste Mundo")
- Doces Poderes (1997)
- Brave New Land (Brava Gente Brasileira) (2000)
- Almost Brothers (Quase Dois Irmãos) (2004)
- The Foreign Eye (Olhar Estrangeiro) (2006)
- Maré, Nossa História de Amor (2007)
- A Long Journey (Uma Longa Viagem) (2011)
- A memória que me contam (2013)
- Praça Paris (2017)
- Playtime (2025), a documentary film, selected in the Generation 14plus section at the 75th Berlin International Film Festival, where it will have its world premiere in February 2025.
