= Forbidden to Forbid =

2006 film directed by Jorge Durán

- Theatrical release poster
- Directed by: Jorge Durán
- Written by: Jorge Durán; Dani Patarra
- Produced by: Jorge Durán; Suzana Amado; Adrian Solar
- Starring: Caio Blat; Maria Flor; Alexandre Rodrigues
- Cinematography: Luis Abramo
- Edited by: Pedro Durán
- Music by: Mauro Senise
- Production companies: El Desierto Filmes; Ceneca Produciones; Media Pro; Antonioli & Amado; Quanta
- Distributed by: RioFilme; Mais Filmes
- Release dates: 2006 (film festivals); April 26, 2007 (Brazil); November 13, 2008 (Chile)
- Running time: 100 minutes
- Countries: Brazil; Chile; Spain
- Language: Portuguese
- Budget: R$1,595,309
- Box office: R$298,600

Forbidden to Forbid (Portuguese: Proibido Proibir; Spanish: Prohibido Prohibir; also known as É Proibido Proibir) is a 2006 Brazilian-Chilean-Spanish drama film directed by Jorge Durán. It stars Caio Blat, Maria Flor and Alexandre Rodrigues as teenagers in a love triangle.

== Plot ==
Paulo is a medical student who shares a small apartment with Leon, his best friend and a sociology student. Leon is dating Leticia, but she and Paulo fall in love. The trio tries to help Rosalina, a terminally ill patient at the University Hospital, reunite with her children who haven't visited her in a long time. While attempting to save Cacauzinho, one of Rosalina's sons, Leon is injured in a shootout. Leticia manages to rescue him, but for Leon to survive, Paulo will have to operate on him in his own home.

== Cast ==
- Caio Blat as Paulo
- Maria Flor as Letícia
- Alexandre Rodrigues as Leon
- Edyr Duqui as Rosalinda
- Adriano de Jesus as Cacazinho
- Luciano Vidigal as Mário
- Raquel Pedras as Rita

== Production ==
Durán searched locations to film during three months, with the filming itself taking place in five weeks in the suburbs of Rio de Janeiro. After four weeks of production, the editing lasted four months.

== Reception ==
Forbidden to Forbid won the Films in Progress Award of the 53rd San Sebastián International Film Festival, and the Best Screenplay and New Director of the Festival de Cine Iberoamericano de Huelva. It won the 2nd FestCine Goiânia for the Best Film, Best Actor for Alexandre Rodrigues, and Best Editing. Durán won the Best Director Award at the Valdivia International Film Festival, while Blat received the Best Actor Award of the Festival de Cinema Luso-Brasileiro de Santa Maria da Feira. At the 11th Brazilian Film Festival of Miami, it won the Best Film Award, Best Director, and Best Actor Award for Blat. It won the Jury Special Award of the 28th Havana Film Festival and of the 4th Quito Festival Cero Latitud, as well as the Best Film Award of the 2006 Biarritz Film Festival and of the 2006 Viña del Mar International Film Festival. It also received a Margarida de Prata Award from the National Conference of Bishops of Brazil.
