= Irene Ravache =

Brazilian actress (born 1944)

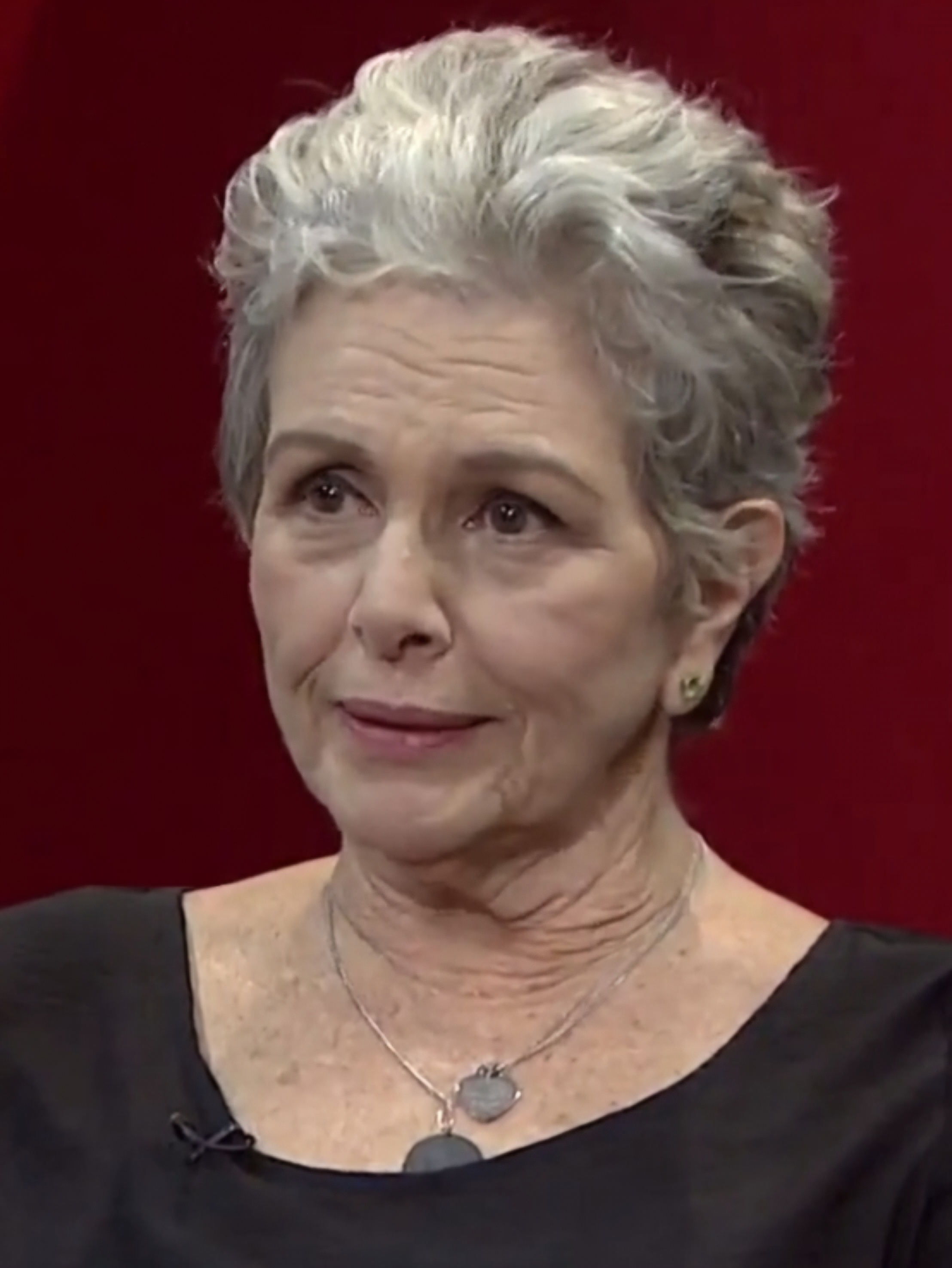
- Ravache in 2016
- Born: Irene Yolanda Ravache; 6 August 1944 (age 81); Rio de Janeiro, Brazil
- Occupation: Actress
- Years active: 1961–present
- Spouse: Edison Paes de Melo Filho (m. 1994)
- Children: 2

Irene Yolanda Ravache Paes de Melo (born 6 August 1944) is a Brazilian film, stage, and television actress. In 2008, she was nominated for an International Emmy Award for her role in Eterna Magia.

== Personal life ==
Ravache is married to journalist Edison Paes de Melo and has two children.

== Filmography ==
=== Film ===
- 2005 - Depois Daquele Baile .... Dóris
- 2002 - Viva Sapato! .... Isolda
- 2001 - Amores Possíveis
- 1999 - Até que a Vida Nos Separe
- 1997 - Ed Mort
- 1989 - Que Bom Te Ver Viva
- 1978 - Doramundo
- 1978 - Curumim
- 1975 - Lição de Amor .... Láura
- 1974 - O Supermanso
- 1972 - Geração em Fuga

=== Television ===
- 2019 - Éramos Seis .... Tereza
- 2012 - Guerra dos Sexos .... Charlotte de Alcântara Pereira Barreto (Charlô II/Cumbuqueta/Altamiranda)
- 2010 - Passione .... Clotilde Iolanda de Souza
- 2008 - Faça Sua História .... Nadir
- 2008 - Dicas de um Sedutor .... Dolores
- 2007 - Eterna Magia .... Loreta O'Neill
- 2007 - Amazônia, de Galvez a Chico Mendes .... Beatriz (segunda fase)
- 2005 - Belíssima .... Katina Solomos Güney
- 2003 - A Casa das Sete Mulheres .... Madalena Aguilar
- 2000 - Marcas da Paixão .... Dete
- 1999 - Suave Veneno .... Eleonor Cerqueira
- 1996 - Razão de Viver .... Luzia
- 1995 - Sangue do Meu Sangue .... Princesa Isabel
- 1994 - Éramos Seis .... Lola
- 1990 - Brasileiras e Brasileiros
- 1987 - Sassaricando .... Leonora Lammar
- 1983 - Champagne .... Antônia Regina
- 1983 - Guerra dos Sexos .... Bárbara
- 1982 - Sol de Verão .... Rachel
- 1982 - Elas por Elas .... Amiga de Márcia
- 1979 - Cara a Cara .... Zeny
- 1977 - O Profeta ....Teresa
- 1975 - A Viagem .... Estela
- 1974 - O Machão .... Dinorá
- 1972 - Na Idade do Lobo .... Cláudia
- 1970 - Simplesmente Maria .... Inez
- 1969 - Super Plá .... Majô Prado
- 1967 - Sublime Amor .... Gina
- 1967 - O Grande Segredo .... Zuleika
- 1966 - Eu Compro Esta Mulher
- 1965 - Paixão de Outono

== Awards and nominations ==
=== APCA Awards ===
Year	Category	Nominee / work	Result
1975	Best Featured Actress in a Play	Roda Cor de Roda	Won
1976	Best Actress – Television	A Viagem	Won
1977	Best Actress – Television	Lição de Amor	Won
1983	Best Actress – Television	Sol de Verão	Won
1990	Best Actress in a Motion Picture	Que Bom Te Ver Viva	Won
1995	Best Actress – Television	Éramos Seis	Won
2010	Best Actress – Television	Passione	Won
2015	Best Actress – Television	Além do Tempo	Nominated

=== Art Quality Brazil Awards ===
Year	Category	Nominee / work	Result
2006	Best Supporting Actress – Television	Belíssima	Nominated

=== Best of the Year – Globe Awards ===
Year	Category	Nominee / work	Result
2010	Best Supporting Actress	Passione	Won
2018	Mário Lago Trophy	Career	Won

=== Brasília Film Festival ===
Year	Category	Nominee / work	Result
1989	Candango for Best Actress	Que Bom Te Ver Viva	Won

=== Brazilian Film Festival of Miami ===
Year	Category	Nominee / work	Result
2001	Best Actress in a Supporting Role	Amores Possíveis	Won

=== Contigo! Awards ===
Year	Category	Nominee / work	Result
2011	Best Supporting Actress – Television	Passione	Nominated

=== Emmy Awards ===
Year	Category	Nominee / work	Result
2008	Best Performance by an Actress	Eterna Magia	Nominated

=== Extra Television Awards ===
Year	Category	Nominee / work	Result
2010	Best Supporting Actress	Passione	Nominated
2015	Best Actress	Além do Tempo	Nominated
2018	Best Supporting Actress	Espelho da Vida	Won

=== Grande Otelo ===
Year	Category	Nominee / work	Result
2002	Best Actress in a Supporting Role	Amores Possíveis	Nominated

=== Guarani Film Awards ===
Year	Category	Nominee / work	Result
2002	Best Supporting Actress	Amores Possíveis	Won
2007	Best Actress	Depois Daquele Baile	Nominated
2015	Best Supporting Actress	Entre Abelhas	Nominated

=== Mambembe Awards ===
Year	Category	Nominee / work	Result
1985	Best Featured Actress in a Play	De Braços Abertos	Won

=== Molière Awards ===
Year	Category	Nominee / work	Result
1976	Best Featured Actress in a Play	Roda Cor de Roda	Won
1985	Best Featured Actress in a Play	De Braços Abertos	Won

=== Press Trophy ===
Year	Category	Nominee / work	Result
1983	Outstanding Performance by an Actress in a Telenovela	Sol de Verão	Won
1984	Outstanding Performance by an Actress in a Telenovela	Champagne	Nominated
1995	Outstanding Performance by an Actress in a Telenovela	Éramos Seis	Won

=== Quem Awards ===
Year	Category	Nominee / work	Result
2015	Best Actress in a Motion Picture	Entre Abelhas	Nominated
2015	Best Actress – Television	Além do Tempo	Nominated

=== Shell Awards ===
Year	Category	Nominee / work	Result
1992	Best Featured Actress in a Play	Uma Relação Tão Delicada	Won
