= Caroline Abras =

Brazilian actress

Carol Abras
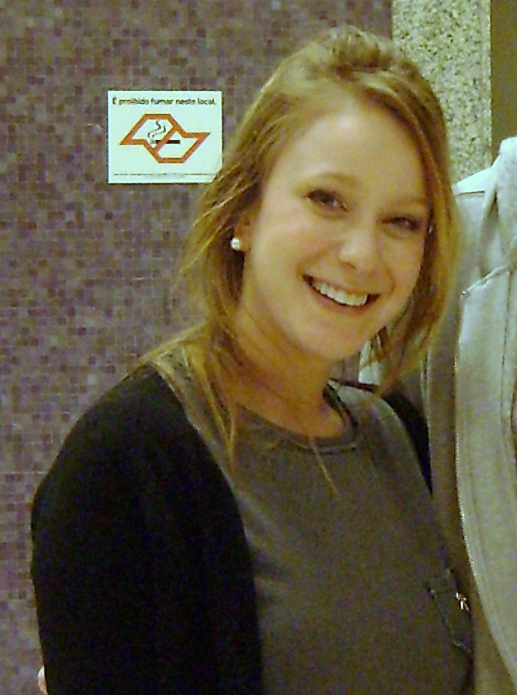
- Carol Abras in November 2010
- Born: Caroline Abras; August 11, 1987 (age 38); São Paulo, Brazil
- Other name: Carol Abras
- Occupation: Actress
- Years active: 2005–present

Caroline Abras (born August 11, 1987 in São Paulo) is a Brazilian actress.

== Awards ==
Won the best actress of the 2008 edition of the Festival do Rio for her role in Se Nada Mais Der Certo.

The actress had twice won the best actress award for short film at the Festival de Gramado.

== Filmography ==
=== Television ===
Year	Title	Role	Notes	Ref.
2005	Malhação	Anita	cameo	
2009	Tudo o que É Sólido Pode Derreter	Laura	cameo	
2009	Paraíso	Jacira		
2010	Tempos Modernos	Katrina		
2011	Morde & Assopra	Tânia	cameo	
2012	Avenida Brasil	Begônia Garcia		
2015	Felizes para Sempre?	Suzana		
2015	I Love Paraisópolis	Ximena		
2018	O Mecanismo	Verena Cardoni		
2022	El Presidente	Lena Dassler		

=== Films ===
Year	Title	Role	Notes
2006	Estranho jeito de amar	Patrícia	
2006	Alguma Coisa Assim	Mari	
2007	Perto de Qualquer Lugar	Gabi	short film
2008	Bellini and the Devil	Sílvia	
2009	Se Nada Mais Der Certo	Marcin	
2010	Estação		short film
2012	Augustas		
2014	Blue Blood		
2016	Entre Idas e Vindas	Cillie	
2017	Gabriel and the Mountain	Cristina	
2025	Latin Blood: The Ballad of Ney Matogrosso	Yara Neiva	
