= A Long Journey (2011 film) =

2011 film directed by Lúcia Murat

- Film poster
- Portuguese: Uma Longa Viagem
- Directed by: Lúcia Murat
- Written by: Lúcia Murat
- Distributed by: Taiga Filmes
- Release date: July 9, 2011 (Paulínia Film Festival)
- Running time: 95 minutes
- Language: Portuguese

A Long Journey (Portuguese: Uma Longa Viagem) is a 2011 documentary film directed by Lúcia Murat. It won the best film award at the 39th Gramado Film Festival.

== Synopsis ==
In 1969, during the dictatorship in Brazil, a family sends their youngest son out of the country in order to avoid their engagement in the armed struggle, as their sister did. Heitor travels the world for nine years and, during this time, sends letters to his relatives.

== Cast ==
- Caio Blat - Heitor
