= Almost Brothers =

2004 film directed by Lúcia Murat

- Theatrical release poster
- Directed by: Lúcia Murat
- Written by: Paulo Lins; Lúcia Murat
- Produced by: Ailton Franco Jr. Branca Murat
- Starring: Caco Ciocler; Flavio Bauraqui; Werner Schünemann; Antônio Pompêo
- Cinematography: Jacob Solitrenick
- Edited by: Mair Tavares
- Music by: Nana Vasconcelos
- Production companies: Taiga Filmes; Ceneca Producciones; TS Productions
- Distributed by: Imovision
- Release dates: September 2004 (Festival do Rio); April 1, 2005 (Brazil)
- Running time: 102 minutes
- Countries: Brazil; Chile; France
- Language: Portuguese
- Box office: 460,087

Almost Brothers (Portuguese: Quase Dois Irmãos) is a 2004 Brazilian film. It was directed by Lúcia Murat and written by Murat and Paulo Lins. Switching back and forth in time between the 1970s and the 2000s, the film follows the friendship between a middle-class left-wing political activist and a criminal from Rio de Janeiro's favelas.

== Cast ==
- Caco Ciocler Miguel (1970s)
  - Werner Schünemann - Miguel (2000s)
  - Brunno Abrahão - Miguel (1950s)
- Flávio Bauraqui - Jorginho (1970s)
  - Antônio Pompêo - Jorginho (2000s)
  - Pablo Ricardo Belo - Jorginho (1950s)
- Maria Flor - Juliana
- Fernando Alves Pinto - Peninha
- Marieta Severo - Helena
- Luiz Melodia - Seu Jorge
- Cristina Aché - Miguel's mother (1970s)
- Lúcia Alves - Miguel's mother (2000s)
- Márcio Vito
- Babu Santana - Pingão
- Renato de Souza - Deley

== Production ==
It was produced by Brazilian studio Taiga Filmes in a co-production with Ceneca Producciones from Chile and TS Productions from France. With a budget of almost R$3 million, it was shot in Rio de Janeiro on March, June, and July 2003.
