= Newton Ishii =

Brazilian police officer

Newton Hidenori Ishii

Personal details
- Born: 18 June 1955 (age 70) Carlópolis, Paraná, Brazil
- Party: PATRI (2018-present)
- Nickname(s): "Japonês da Federal" (Japanese Man of the Federal) "Japonês Bonzinho" (Good Japanese Man)

Newton Hidenori Ishii (born 1955), also known as Japonês da Federal (English: Japanese Man of the Federal), is a former Brazilian agent of the Brazilian Federal Police and politician who has won notoriety for participating in the arrest of persons during Operation Car Wash.

Despite being considered an anti-corruption icon in Brazilian protests against corruption, on 7 June 2016, Ishii was arrested after being found guilty for facilitating smuggling when he was border agent in Foz do Iguaçu and sentenced to four years in prison.

Former Federal Police (PF) officer Newton Ishii, who became known as the "Japanese of the Federal" after becoming famous for appearances alongside notable prisoners in Operation Car Wash, was condemned of facilitating contraband across the Brazil-Paraguay border, in Foz do Iguaçu, according to information from UOL.

According to the report, he will lose his position and will still have to pay a fine of R$ 200,000. Although he retired in 2018, it is not the court that will decide the termination of retirement, which may be reached in this case.

According to the decision of Judge Sérgio Luis Ruivo Marques, of the 1st Federal Court of Foz do Iguaçu (PR), Ishii's conduct was "extremely serious, with a direct affront to the dignity of the public function he exercised".

The action points out that he "hid behind the institutional apparatus aimed at fighting crime on the border, to facilitate smuggling / embezzlement, which prevents the agent, after such fact, from continuing to act as a police officer".

In 2018 Ishii took office as regional president of Patriot (PATRI) in Paraná.
