= Lamarca =

Lamarca or LaMarca is a surname. Notable people with the surname include:

- Anthony LaMarca, American musician
- Carla Lamarca (born 1982), Brazilian musician
- Carlos Lamarca (1937–1971), Brazilian communist
- Dolors Lamarca (1943–2026), Spanish-Catalan philologist and librarian
- Guillermo Lamarca (born 1949), Argentine rugby union player and coach
- Iñigo Lamarca (born 1959), Spanish lawyer
- Roberto Lamarca (1959–2017), Venezuelan actor
- Russell LaMarca, American politician
- Tania Lamarca (born 1980), Spanish rhythmic gymnast
