= A. J. Langguth =

American journalist, author and educator (1933–2014)

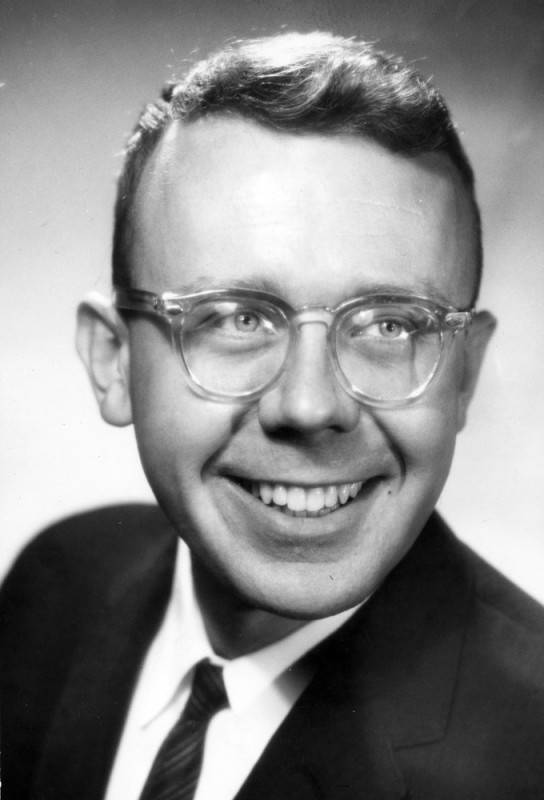
- Langguth in 1960
- Born: Arthur John Langguth; July 11, 1933 Minneapolis, Minnesota, United States
- Died: September 1, 2014 (aged 81) Los Angeles, California, United States
- Occupation: Author, journalist, educator

Arthur John Langguth (July 11, 1933 – September 1, 2014) was an American author, journalist and educator, born in Minneapolis, Minnesota. He was professor of the Annenberg School for Communications School of Journalism at the University of Southern California (USC). Langguth was the author of several dark, satirical novels, a biography of the English short story master Saki, and lively histories of the Trail of Tears, the American Revolution, the War of 1812, Afro-Brazilian religion in Brazil and the United States, the Vietnam War, the political life of Julius Caesar and U.S. involvement with torture in Latin America. A graduate of Harvard College (AB, 1955), Langguth was South East Asian correspondent and Saigon bureau chief for The New York Times during the Vietnam War, using the byline "Jack Langguth". He also wrote and reported for Look magazine in Washington, D.C. and The Valley Times in Los Angeles, California. Langguth joined the journalism faculty at USC in 1976. He was awarded a Guggenheim Fellowship in 1976, and received the Freedom Forum Award, honoring the nation's top journalism educators, in 2001. He retired from active teaching at USC in 2003.

Langguth lived in Hollywood and died on September 1, 2014, at the age of 81.

== Bibliography ==
=== Fiction ===
- Jesus Christs. New York City: Harper & Row. 1968. LCCN 67028818. OCLC 885694.
- Wedlock. Alfred A. Knopf. 1972. ISBN 978-0-394-47275-1. LCCN 73154928. OCLC 1336189557.
- Marksman. New York City: Harper & Row. 1974. ISBN 978-0-06-012499-1. LCCN 73014314. OCLC 729779325.

=== Non-fiction ===
- Macumba: White and Black Magic in Brazil. New York City: Harper & Row. 1975. ISBN 978-0-06-012503-5. LCCN 74001830. OCLC 1011246659.
- Hidden Terrors. New York City: Pantheon Books. 1978. ISBN 978-0-394-40674-9. LCCN 77088769. OCLC 3670920.
- Saki, a Life of Hector Hugh Munro With Six Short Stories Never Before Collected. New York City: Simon & Schuster. 1981. ISBN 978-0-671-24715-7. LCCN 81005607. OCLC 1014631677.
- Patriots: The Men Who Started the American Revolution. New York City: Simon & Schuster. 1988. ISBN 978-0-671-52375-6. LCCN 87026586. OCLC 16869621.
- A Noise of War: Caesar, Pompey, Octavian, and the Struggle for Rome. New York City: Simon & Schuster. 1994. ISBN 978-0-671-70829-0. LCCN 93039196. OCLC 246929547.
- Our Vietnam: The War, 1954-1975. New York City: Simon & Schuster. 2000. ISBN 978-0-684-81202-1. LCCN 00057384. OCLC 44509372.
- Union 1812: The Americans who Fought the Second War of Independence. New York City: Simon & Schuster. 2006. ISBN 978-0-7432-2618-9. LCCN 2006040340. OCLC 65521562.
- Driven West: Andrew Jackson and the Trail of Tears to the Civil War. New York City: Simon & Schuster. 2010. ISBN 978-1-4165-4859-1. LCCN 2010020455. OCLC 503049286.
- After Lincoln: How the North Won the Civil War and Lost the Peace. New York City: Simon & Schuster. 2014. ISBN 978-1-4516-1732-0. LCCN 2013051340. OCLC 1089813157.

== See also ==
- History of Uruguay
- Lincoln Gordon
- Military dictatorship in Brazil
- Office of Public Safety (OPS)
