= Que Bom Te Ver Viva =

- Directed by: Lúcia Murat
- Written by: Lúcia Murat
- Starring: Irene Ravache
- Cinematography: Walter Carvalho
- Edited by: Vera Freire
- Distributed by: Embrafilme
- Release date: 1989
- Running time: 100 minutes
- Country: Brazil
- Language: Portuguese

Que Bom Te Ver Viva (English: How Nice to See You Alive) is a 1989 Brazilian docudrama directed by Lúcia Murat, which portrays the situation of torture experienced during the military dictatorship in Brazil.

== Synopsis ==
Lúcia Murat, who was tortured during the military dictatorship, chronicles the lives of some Brazilian women who took up arms against the military regime. There are a number of guerrilla testimonies and daily scenes from these women who have recovered, each in their own way, the various meanings of life.

== Awards ==
1989: Festival de Brasília

1. Best Film (won)
2. Best Actress (Irene Ravache) (won)
3. Best Cinematography (Walter Carvalho) (won)

1990: Festival do Rio

1. Special Jury Award (won)
