= Hidden Terrors =

1978 book by A. J. Langguth

Hidden Terrors: The Truth About U.S. Police Operations in Latin America
- Author: A. J. Langguth
- Language: English
- Subject: American foreign policy
- Publisher: Pantheon Books
- Publication date: 1978
- Publication place: United States
- ISBN: 0394406745

Hidden Terrors: The Truth About U.S. Police Operations in Latin America is a 1978 book about American foreign policy in Brazil and Uruguay in the 1960s and early 1970s by the journalist A. J. Langguth.

== Reception ==
In May 1978, a month before the publication date, a hit piece was published in The New York Times by Graham Hovey, discrediting Langguth and the accusations he made towards the CIA and the United States Government in his book.

== See also ==
- History of Uruguay
- History of Brazil (1964-1985)
- Office of Public Safety (OPS)
- Lincoln Gordon
