= Episode 1 (Tá no Ar) =

- Tá no Ar episode
- Marcelo Adnet parodying the presenter Silvio Santos.
- Episode no.: Season 1 Episode 1
- Directed by: Maurício Farias
- Written by: Marcelo Adnet; Marcius Melhem
- Original air date: April 10, 2014
- Running time: 28 minutes

Guest appearance
- Ricardo Macchi was himself.

Episode chronology
← Previous —	Next → "Episode 2"

The first episode of the Brazilian situation comedy Tá no Ar premiered on the Globo Network on Thursday night, April 10, 2014. It was written by series creators Marcelo Adnet and Marcius Melhem, and directed by Maurício Farias.

This episode received generally positive reviews from critics, particularly for the writing and the parodies. According to Ibope, the episode were watched by 3.03 million viewers during their original broadcast in São Paulo and Rio de Janeiro, the two major advertising markets in Brazil.

== Production ==
=== Development ===
"Marcius was very generous to me. He's a guy who knows much better than I the station [sic]. He gave me a lot of freedom to be who I am."
—Marcelo Adnet about the "help" that Marcius gave him.

On January 28, 2013, comedian Marcelo Adnet is hired by TV Globo, after leaving the MTV Brasil.

His first program, O Dentista Mascarado, created by Fernanda Young and Alexandre Machado, had low ratings, which resulted in its cancellation after 12 episodes. After the end of the program, Adnet was added to the cast of Fantástico, producing parody and entertainment blocks. However, he eventually left the program later.

Later, TV Globo asked Marcius Melhem, who had just finished Os Caras de Pau, produces a comedy show starring Adnet. Melhem created a sketches program, but with a different style from the other programs of this format in Brazil, very similar to TV Pirata, satirical series that made a success on TV Globo in the 1980s.

=== Release ===
The premiere took place on April 10, 2014, proceeding Doce de Mãe, composing the third slot of Thursday shows, which is usually displayed between 11:30 PM–12:30 AM.

== Cast ==
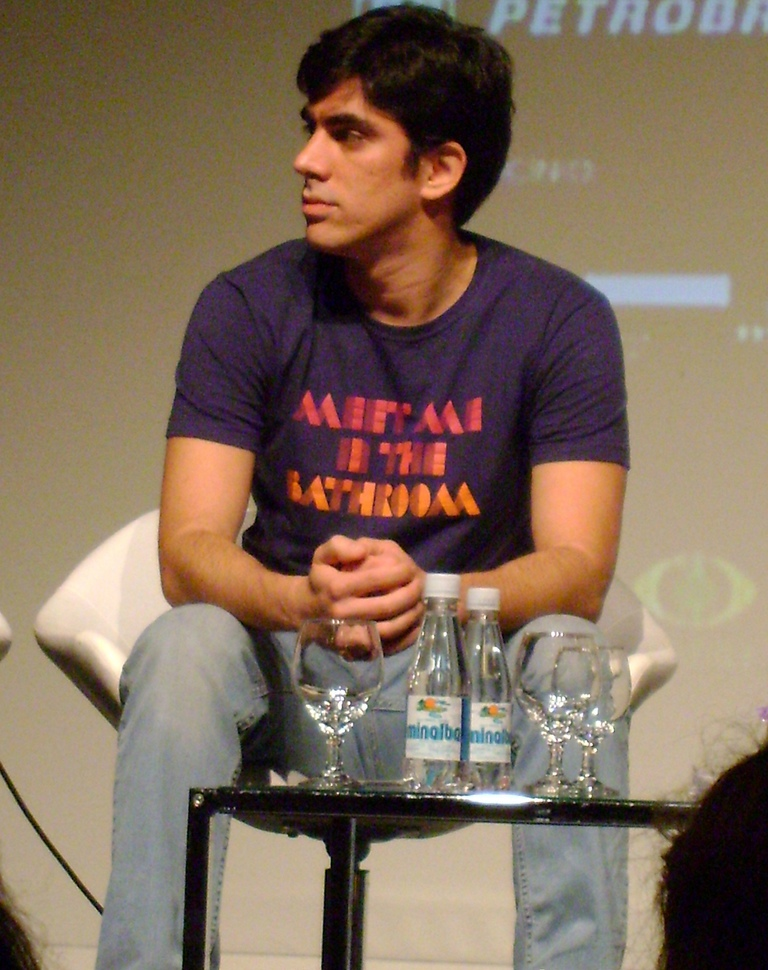
Marcelo Adnet plays various characters.

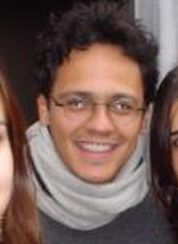
Danton Mello, supporting actor.

Actor/Actress
Marcelo Adnet
Marcius Melhem
Danton Mello
Carol Portes
Georgiana Góes
Luana Martau
Maurício Rizzo
Márcio Vito
Renata Gaspar
Verônica Debom
Welder Rodrigues

== Reception ==
=== Ratings ===
In its original airing on the Globo network, the first episode of Tá no Ar acquired a 10.0 Ibope Rating and 24,4 percent share of the audience, considering the measurement to Greater São Paulo. It was viewed in approximately 620,000 homes, considering that in the 2014-15 season, one point equals 62,000 homes. In terms of total viewers, the episode was watched by 1.93 million. In the 2014-15 season, each point represents 193.281 viewers. In Rio, the second largest advertising market in Brazil, the episode acquired an 11.0 Ibope Rating. Approximately 429,000 households and 1.1 million viewers watched the episode. This hearing is considered "satisfactory".

=== Critical ===
The debut of the series was well received by critics. Fernando Oliveira, of R7, labeled it "best premiere", and highlighted the satires and references to other programs. Mauricio Stycer, of Universo Online (UOL), was positive, and highlighted the parody of a northeastern activist.
