= A Nobreza do Amor =

- Genre: Telenovela
- Created by: Duca Rachid; Júlio Fischer; Elísio Lopes Jr.
- Written by: Alessandro Marson; Dora Castellar; Dione Carlos; Dimas Novais
- Directed by: Gustavo Fernandez
- Starring: Duda Santos; Ronald Sotto; Lázaro Ramos; Erika Januza; Nicolas Prattes; Theresa Fonseca; Rodrigo Simas; Zezé Motta
- Theme music composer: Jorge Ben
- Opening theme: "Zumbi" by Jorge Ben
- Country of origin: Brazil
- Original language: Portuguese
- No. of seasons: 1
- No. of episodes: 193

Production
- Production company: Estúdios Globo

Original release
- Network: TV Globo
- Release: 16 March – 6 November 2026

Related
- Cordel Encantado

A Nobreza do Amor (English: The Nobility of Love) is a Brazilian telenovela created by Duca Rachid, Júlio Fischer and Elísio Lopes Jr. It aired on TV Globo from 16 March 2026 to 6 November 2026. The telenovela stars Duda Santos, Ronald Sotto, Lázaro Ramos, Erika Januza, Nicolas Prattes, Theresa Fonseca, Rodrigo Simas and Zezé Motta.

== Plot ==
The fictional kingdom of Batanga, home to vast natural resources such as tungsten and located on the west coast of Africa, was liberated from Portuguese colonial rule in the late 19th century, thanks to the efforts of the future king and queen, Cayman II and Niara, alongside the couple's trusted advisor, Jendal, who became the nation's prime minister. From the union between Cayman and Niara, Princess Alika was born, whose name means "the most beautiful among the beautiful". However, even in times of peace, a prophecy from the oracle Oruka, warning of the end of the royal dynasty, leads to Alika being betrothed to Jendal while still a child, in an attempt to ensure the princess's safety.

In the 1924, Alika, now an adult, refuses to marry Jendal and hinders his plans to seize power by convincing her parents to sign a trade agreement with the Turkish representatives, Pasha Soliman and his son, Omar, who is smitten with Alika. Jendal, angered that his agreement with the British to exploit tungsten is in jeopardy, plots a coup with them and manages to seize the throne, ordering the princess to marry him in exchange for her parents' lives. The wedding takes place but is not consummated, thanks to Omar, who organizes the royal family's escape. Cayman dies during the escape, and Omar is arrested, but Niara and Alika manage to flee to Brazil, to the countryside of Rio Grande do Norte, where Zambi, the dead king's brother, lives. As fugitives, mother and daughter assume the identities of Vera and Lúcia, respectively.

In the fictional town of Barro Preto, Alika/Lúcia meets Tonho, a humble worker at a sugarcane mill who dreams of owning a piece of land to help his people. The chemistry between them is immediate, though neither will admit it. Even in Brazil, Alika seeks ways to save her people from tyranny, unaware that Tonho is the direct heir and descendant of the mythical King Shaka, leading them to join forces to fight injustice and prevent Jendal from conquering the kingdom. Tonho ends up facing competition for Alika's heart from the heir to the sugar mill where he works, Mirinho, a spoiled and ambitious young man, son of Colonel Casimiro Bonafé. The relationship between Mirinho and Alika also infuriates the heir's fiancée, the scheming Virgínia, who is even willing to reveal Alika's whereabouts to Jendal to keep her away from her suitor.

== Cast ==
- Duda Santos as Alika Cayman, Princess of Batanga / Lúcia dos Santos
- Ronald Sotto as Antonio "Tonho" Setúbal
- Lázaro Ramos as Jendal Trabelsi, Duke of Batanga
- Erika Januza as Niara Cayman, Queen of Batanga / Vera dos Santos
- Nicolas Prattes as Casemiro Bonafé Júnior "Mirinho"
- Theresa Fonseca as Virgínia Almeida Borges
- Rodrigo Simas as Omar Soliman
- Zezé Motta as Maria Amélia "Dona Menina"
- Cássio Gabus Mendes as Colonel Casemiro Bonafé
- Fabiana Karla as Maria das Graças Bonafé "Graça"
- Paulo Lessa as Onildo Monteiro
- Bukassa Kabengele as José dos Santos / Zambi
- Ana Cecília Costa as Teresa dos Santos
- Fábio Lago as Mayor Bartolomeu Lobo "Bartô"
- Danton Mello as Diógenes Almeida Borges
- Emanuelle Araújo as Marta Almeida Borges
- Rayssa Bratillieri as Salma Curi
- Julia Lemos as Ana Maria Bonafé
- Daniel Rangel as Manoel Aragão
- Nykolly Fernandes as Kênia
- João Fernandes as Fuad
- Marcelo Médici as Father Viriato Santana
- André Luiz Miranda as Akin
- Cyria Coentro as Caetana
- Rita Batista as Ladisa
- Samantha Jones as Mundica
- Ítalo Martins as Januário da Rocha
- Lukete as Cícero "Ciço"
- Kika Kalache as Fátima Curi
- Eduardo Mossri as Miguel Curi
- César Ferrario Delegate Fortunato Aragão
- Quitéria Kelly as Maria Helena Aragão
- Vado as Oruka
- Hilton Cobra as Chinua
- Licinio Januário as Dumi
- Raissa Xavier as Belmira
- Gabriel Fuentes as Adonis Ferreirinha
- João Pedro Zappa as Mr. Jones
- Michel Blois as Mr. Campbell
- Vitória Rodrigues as Auxiliadora Lobo "Dôra"
- Carol Brada as Dona Geralda Ferreirinha
- Gabriela Dias
- João Fontenele as Sebastião Sobrinho
- Levi Asaf as Vitalino
- Antonela Benvenuti as Aurelinda Almeida Borges
- Julia Salarini as Rita de Cássia "Ritinha"

=== Guest stars ===
- Welket Bunguê as Jafari Cayman II, King de Batanga
- Marco Ricca as Paxá Soliman
- Lucy Ramos as Maria Cesária, Queen of Seráfia do Norte
- Carmo Dalla Vecchia as Augusto Frederico Ávila III, King of Seráfia do Norte

== Ratings ==
| Season | Episodes | First aired | | Last aired | | Avg. viewers (points) |
| Season | Episodes | Date | Viewers (points) | Date | Viewers (points) | Avg. viewers (points) |
|---|---|---|---|---|---|---|
| 1 | 193 | 16 March 2026 | 17.3 | 6 November 2026 | 19.9 | 17.5 |
