= Garota do Momento =

- Genre: Telenovela
- Created by: Alessandra Poggi
- Written by: Adriana Chevalier; Rita Lemgruber; Pedro Alvarenga; Aline Garbati; Mariani Ferreira
- Directed by: Jeferson De; Natália Grimberg
- Starring: Duda Santos; Pedro Novaes; Maisa; Carol Castro; Fábio Assunção; Lília Cabral; Letícia Colin; Paloma Duarte
- Theme music composer: Little Richard; Dorothy LaBostrie
- Opening theme: "Tutti Frutti" by Little Richard
- Country of origin: Brazil
- Original language: Portuguese
- No. of seasons: 1
- No. of episodes: 202

Production
- Producer: Juliana Castro
- Production company: Estúdios Globo

Original release
- Network: TV Globo
- Release: 4 November 2024 – 27 June 2025

Garota do Momento (English title: She's the One) is a Brazilian telenovela created by Alessandra Poggi. It aired on TV Globo from 4 November 2024 to 27 June 2025. The telenovela stars Duda Santos, Pedro Novaes, Maisa, Carol Castro, Fábio Assunção, Lília Cabral, Letícia Colin and Paloma Duarte.

== Cast ==
=== Main ===
- Duda Santos as Beatriz Dourado
- Pedro Novaes as Roberto "Beto" Sobral
- Maisa as Beatriz "Bia" Dourado Alencar / Isabel Alencar
- Carol Castro as Clarice Dourado Alencar
- Fábio Assunção as Juliano Alencar
- Lília Cabral as Maristela Alencar
- Letícia Colin as Zélia
- Paloma Duarte as Lígia Sobral
- Danton Mello as Raimundo Sobral
- João Vítor Silva as Ronaldo Sobral
- Débora Ozório as Celeste Sobral
- Caio Manhente as Eduardo
- Klara Castanho as Eugênia Honório
- Maria Flor as Anita
- Eduardo Sterblitch as Alfredo Honório
- Maria Eduarda de Carvalho as Teresa Honório
- Philipp Lavra as Orlando
- Tatiana Tiburcio as Vera Machado
- Ícaro Silva as Ulisses Machado
- Mariana Sena as Glória "Glorinha"
- Cauê Campos as Basílio
- Felipe Abib as Nelson
- Silvero Pereira as Érico / Verônica Queen
- Carla Cristina Cardoso as Iolanda
- Rebeca Carvalho as Ana Maria
- Caio Cabral as Carlos "Carlito"
- Ana Flávia Cavalcanti as Marlene
- Gabriel Milane as Luiz Cláudio "Topete"
- Pedro Goifman as Augusto "Guto"
- Cridemar Aquino as Sebastião Machado
- Flávia Reis as Jacira
- Mariah da Penha as Aparecida
- Arlinda Di Baio as Conceição
- João Vithor Oliveira as Mauro
- Sergio Kauffmann as Sérgio Amorim
- Sidy Correa as Dr. Protásio
- Cilene Guedes as Coralina
- Jéssica Lamana as Susana
- Luisa Lovato as Lucinha

=== Guest stars ===
- Solange Couto as Carmem Dourado
- Bete Mendes as Arlete
- Julia Stockler as Valéria
- Gaby Amarantos as Emília Costa
- Paulo Vieira as Mirosmar Piratininga
- Thiago Voltolini as Rodolfo
- Laura Morena as Beatriz (criança)

== Production ==
=== Development ===
Initially, Lícia Manzo's O País de Alice (Alice's Country) had been approved to replace Elas por Elas in the "six o'clock slot" in April 2024, while Mário Teixeira's No Rancho Fundo would not premiere until the second half of the year. On 30 August 2023, TV Globo canceled Manzo's telenovela and pushed up the premiere of Teixeira's telenovela. As a result of No Rancho Fundo being fast-tracked, Alessandra Poggi's telenovela, which was scheduled to premiere in the first half of 2025, was pushed up to November 2024, with Grimberg taking over as director following the cancellation of O País de Alice.

Initially, the telenovela had the working title Tutti Frutti, which is the same name as a sweet made from citrus fruits and which would refer to the cultural movement of the 1950s, the backdrop of the telenovela, as well as being the title of a famous song, which would later become the opening theme of the telenovela. However, on 6 June 2024, during the screening of the teaser for TV Globo's programming for the second half of the year, it was announced that the new title of the soap opera would be A Garota do Momento, whose name would be inspired by the song Girl of the Moment, which was featured in the Oscar-nominated film Lady in the Dark (1944). The title also refers to the protagonist of the plot, who will achieve success in the world of fashion and advertising, where at the time, the term "garota do momento" (girl of the moment) carried the same weight as the current term it girl. Later, the title was simplified to Garota do Momento, in keeping with the term of that period.

=== Filming ===
Filming began on 19 August 2024, in Copacabana, a neighborhood in the south of Rio de Janeiro, and in Glória, in the city center. Petrópolis, in the mountainous region of Rio de Janeiro, will also serve as a location. In September, the crew shot scenes in Rua Teófilo Otoni, in the center of Rio, of a carnival parade where Beatriz (Duda Santos) passes through when she arrives in the city in search of her mother.

== Ratings ==
| Season | Episodes | First aired | | Last aired | | Avg. viewers (points) |
| Season | Episodes | Date | Viewers (points) | Date | Viewers (points) | Avg. viewers (points) |
|---|---|---|---|---|---|---|
| 1 | 202 | 4 November 2024 | 21.0 | 27 June 2025 | 21.5 | 18.1 |
