= Terra Nostra (TV series) =

- Genre: Telenovela
- Created by: Benedito Ruy Barbosa
- Starring: Ana Paula Arósio; Thiago Lacerda; Carolina Kasting; Antônio Fagundes; Débora Duarte; Raul Cortez; Maria Fernanda Cândido; Ângela Vieira; Marcello Antony; Paloma Duarte; Gabriel Braga Nunes; Antônio Calloni; Lu Grimaldi
- Opening theme: "Tormento D'amore" - Charlotte Church and Agnaldo Rayol
- Country of origin: Brazil
- Original language: Portuguese
- No. of seasons: 1
- No. of episodes: 221

Production
- Production locations: Brazil; Italy
- Running time: 65 mins

Original release
- Network: TV Globo
- Release: September 20, 1999 – June 3, 2000

Terra Nostra (English: Our Land) is a Brazilian telenovela, produced and broadcast by TV Globo in 1999. The telenovela is written by Benedito Ruy Barbosa and directed by Jayme Monjardim.

The story is set in the late 19th century and takes place at a time when slaves were freed in Brazil and there was a need for workers, especially on Brazilian coffee fazendas (plantations). This partly resulted in many Italians migrating to Brazil, looking for employment and a better life. Unlike many other telenovela stories, the characters are not larger than life in "Terra Nostra." Instead, they are everyday people who make ordinary decisions. Consequently, the viewers can relate to what is happening in the story.

Musical director Marcus Viana compiled several traditional Italian songs, performed by musicians such as Charlotte Church, Caetano Veloso, Zizi Possi, and Jerry Adriani. The soundtrack also includes original instrumental music by Viana.

== Plot ==
The telenovela takes place in Brazil between the end of nineteenth century and early twentieth century. This historical telenovela tells the story of these Italian immigrants. It focuses on the relationship of Giuliana Esplendore (Ana Paula Arosío) and Matteo Batistela (Thiago Lacerda) who meet each other during the voyage to Brazil. Most of the story takes place on a coffee farm in São Paulo.

Giuliana and Matteo immediately fall in love and plan a life together. Unfortunately, fate and some people do not plan it that way. A series of mishaps befall the couple and keep them apart. When they finally reunite, their conduct affects not only their lives, but also other people they have met along the way.

After docking, Giuliana and Matteo became lost and followed different paths. She is welcomed by Francesco (Raul Cortez), a millionaire banker friend of her deceased parents. Francesco is married to Jeanett, a haughty and arrogant woman, and is the father of Marco Antonio, a bon vivant.

Matteo meanwhile works on the farm of Gumercindo (Antonio Fagundes), a coffee baron who is married to Maria do Socorro. While he is a loving father to his daughter Angélica, he is cruel to his other daughter, Rosana (Carolina Kasting).

Marco Antonio, son of Francesco, falls madly in love with Giuliana, who rejects him in her determination to find her love, Matteo. However, when she discovers Matteo is expecting a son, Marco Antonio sees the chance to be with her. Marco asks Giuliana to marry him and, in fear, she accepts.

Meanwhile, on the farm of Gumercindo, Matteo's charm enchants Angélica and Rosana. While Angélica is a shy girl, Rosana is impulsive and has a strong personality. Rosana invests in Matteo despite being repeatedly rejected by him. However, Rosana falsely claims that she and Mateo had sex, which results in Gumercindo forcing Mateo to marry her against his will. For Angélica to join the convent, Gumercindo accepts the wedding proposal of Augusto, a young man with dreams of becoming a politician.

Augusto, however, maintains an affair with Paola, a beautiful and fiery Italian who had arrived on the same ship as Matteo and Giuliana. Anacleto, her father, forces Augusto to take responsibility of Paola and Augusto and purchases a home for her in São Paulo, living together without being married. Subsequently, Angélica and Augusto marry and move to São Paulo, and Paola becomes Angelica's friend. In realizing that Augusto is happily married, Paola relinquishes her hope of marrying him.

Gumercindo approaches Francesco with a business proposition. At this point, Matteo is already married with Rosana, with whom he is expecting a son, and Giuliana had a daughter, Annie, with Marco. But when the real desires of Giuliana and Matteo's son is uncovered, the marriage of Francesco and Jeanette falls apart, and Giuliana also separates from Marco.

The story concludes with Giuliana marrying Matteo and them expecting a child together, and Matteo adopts Aniña.

Moral issues arise which produce fruitful debate for the television viewers. There are no simple answers because none of the characters or issues are strictly right or wrong, black or white. The issues and personalities are gray and will cause the viewers to change their minds during the storyline.

== Cast ==
- Ana Paula Arósio as Giuliana Splendore
- Thiago Lacerda as Matteo Battistella
- Carolina Kasting as Rosana Telles de Aranha
- Marcello Antony as Marco Antônio Magliano
- Antônio Fagundes as Gumercindo Telles de Aranha
- Débora Duarte as Maria do Socorro Teles de Aranha
- Raul Cortez as Francesco Magliano
- Ângela Vieira as Janete Magliano
- Maria Fernanda Cândido as Paola
- Paloma Duarte as Angélica Telles de Aranha
- Gabriel Braga Nunes as Augusto Marcondes
- Antônio Calloni as Bartolo Migliavacca
- Lu Grimaldi as Leonora
- Cláudia Raia as Hortênsia
- Odilon Wagner as Altino Marcondes
- Elias Gleizer as Padre Olavo
- Raymundo de Souza as Renato
- Roberto Bonfim as Agente Justino
- Jackson Antunes as Antenor
- José Dumont as Batista
- André Luiz Miranda as Júlio Francisco Santana (Tiziu)
- Débora Olivieri as Inês
- Danton Mello as Bruno
- Tânia Bondezan as Mariana
- Gésio Amadeu as Damião
- Mário César Camargo as Anacleto
- Adriana Lessa as Naná
- Fernanda Muniz as Luísa
- Adhenor de Souza as Juvenal
- Sônia Zagury as Antônia
- Fábio Dias as Amadeo
- Paulo de Almeida as Toninho
- Bianca Castanho as Florinda
- Guilherme Bernard as José Alceu
- Juan Alba as Josué
- Tarciana Saad as Matilde
- Lolita Rodrigues as Dolores
- Nicolas Prattes as Francesquinho
- Ilva Niño as Sister Letícia
