= Episode 7 (Tá no Ar) =

- Tá no Ar episode
- A parody of American show Friends — 'Crentes' (Portuguese for Believers) — received negative criticism from Evangelical Protestants public.
- Episode no.: Season 1 Episode 7
- Directed by: Maurício Farias
- Written by: Marcelo Adnet; Marcius Melhem
- Original air date: May 22, 2014
- Running time: 25 minutes

Episode chronology
← Previous "Episode 6"	Next → "Episode 8"

The seventh episode of the Brazilian situation comedy Tá no Ar originally aired on the Globo Network on Thursday night, May 22, 2014. It was written by series creators Marcelo Adnet and Marcius Melhem, and directed by Maurício Farias.

The episode received negative reviews from the public by the sequence of "Believers" which satirizes the stereotypes that surround religion, as the payment of tithes and gospel teachings. According to Ibope, the episode were watched by 1.52 million viewers during their original broadcast in Greater São Paulo area.

== Cast ==
- Marcelo Adnet
- Marcius Melhem
- Danton Mello
- Carol Portes
- Georgiana Góes
- Luana Martau
- Maurício Rizzo
- Márcio Vito
- Renata Gaspar
- Verônica Debom
- Welder Rodrigues

== Reception ==
=== Ratings ===
In its original airing on the Globo network, the seventh episode of Tá no Ar acquired an 8.2 Ibope Rating. This indicates that about 508.400 homes and 1.52 million viewers in the Greater São Paulo watched this episode. The episode finished second in its time slot behind A Praça é Nossa, which registered 9.0 rating.

=== Controversy ===
A sequence of this episode that parodies the opening of Friends caused controversy. The satire, titled "Believers", lampooning stereotypes involving religion, as the payment of tithes and gospel teachings. On final scene, the cast members sing the song "Pago o dízimo/10% para o pastor" (parody to the chorus "I'll be there for you / when the rain starts to pour"). The parody was met with negative criticism from the Evangelical Protestants public, which felt "offended" and "angry" on social networks. In response, Marcius Melhem, in an interview to Universo Online (UOL), said he did not believe the negative comments are representative to the evangelical public in general. "We joke with all religions. We joke, not offended," he added.
