= No Tomorrow (TV series) =

Television series

- Title card from the series' premiere episode
- Genre: Comic science-fiction; Romantic fantasy; Fantasy; Comedy drama
- Based on: Como Aproveitar o Fim do Mundo by: Fernanda Young; Alexandre Machado
- Developed by: Corinne Brinkerhoff
- Starring: Joshua Sasse; Tori Anderson; Jonathan Langdon; Sarayu Blue; Jesse Rath; Amy Pietz
- Composers: Wendy Melvoin; Lisa Coleman
- Country of origin: United States
- Original language: English
- No. of seasons: 1
- No. of episodes: 13

Production
- Executive producers: Corinne Brinkerhoff; Maggie Friedman; Ben Silverman; Brad Silberling; Scott McCabe; Sean Canino; Tory Stanton
- Production locations: Vancouver, British Columbia
- Camera setup: Single-camera
- Running time: 43 minutes
- Production companies: Globo TV International; Electus Entertainment; Warner Bros. Television; CBS Television Studios

Original release
- Network: The CW
- Release: October 4, 2016 – January 17, 2017

No Tomorrow is an American romantic comedy-drama television series that aired on The CW from October 4, 2016, to January 17, 2017. The series was developed by Corinne Brinkerhoff. It is based on the 2012 Brazilian series Como Aproveitar o Fim do Mundo (How to Enjoy the End of the World), which aired on Rede Globo in 2012. The show was filmed in Vancouver, British Columbia, Canada. No Tomorrow was canceled on May 8, 2017; five days later, an epilogue to the series was released.

== Plot ==
The series follows a woman who lives in Seattle and becomes involved with a free-spirited man who inspires her to make an "apocalyst", a list of things to do before the world ends—which he claims will be in eight months and twelve days. With the help of her friends, they try to find out if he can be taken seriously while completing the bucket list.

== Cast and characters ==
=== Main ===
- Tori Anderson as Evie Covington, a bored middle-manager employed in a supply warehouse who pushes herself into Xavier's carefree world.
- Joshua Sasse as Xavier Holliday, an eccentric, free-spirited individual who believes that the world will come to an end in eight months and plots to live life as fully as he can.
- Jonathan Langdon as Hank Barkley, Evie's cheerful co-worker.
- Sarayu Blue as Kareema, Evie's grumpy and cynical co-worker.
- Jesse Rath as Timothy Finger, Evie's former boyfriend.
- Amy Pietz as Deirdre Hackmeyer, Evie's shallow boss.

=== Recurring ===
- George Basil as Jesse, Xavier's cousin.
- Ted McGinley as Gary, Evie's father.
- Kelly Stables as Mary Anne, Evie's older sister.
- Gigi Rice as Gloria, Evie's mother.
- Vinny Chhibber as Rohan, Kareema's brother.

== Episodes ==
No.	Title	Directed by	Written by	Original release date	Prod. code	U.S. viewers (millions)
1	"Pilot"	Brad Silberling	Corinne Brinkerhoff & Scott McCabe & Tory Stanton	October 4, 2016	101	1.51
2	"No Crying in Baseball"	Stuart Gillard	Maggie Friedman & Tory Stanton & Scott McCabe	October 11, 2016	102	0.74
3	"No Doubt"	John Putch	Richard Hatem	October 18, 2016	103	0.81
4	"No Holds Barred"	Jeff Melman	Jenna Lamia	October 25, 2016	104	0.78
5	"No Regrets"	Ron Underwood	Bill Krebs	November 1, 2016	105	0.76
6	"No Debts Remain Unpaid"	Allan Arkush	Justin W. Lo	November 15, 2016	106	0.80
7	"No You Say It First"	Stuart Gillard	Grace Glassmeyer	November 22, 2016	107	0.80
8	"No Rest for the Weary"	Michael Schultz	Jessica Chou	November 29, 2016	108	0.94
9	"No Truer Words"	Ami Mann	Anna Fisher	December 6, 2016	109	0.80
10	"No Soup for You"	Anna Mastro	Aaron Fullerton	December 27, 2016	110	0.60
11	"No Woman No Cry"	Greg Beeman	Scott McCabe & Tory Stanton	January 3, 2017	111	0.51
12	"No Time Like the Present"	Greg Prange	Andrew Gettens & Lauren MacKenzie	January 10, 2017	112	0.70
13	"No Sleep 'Til Reykjavik"	Stuart Gillard	Corinne Brinkerhoff & Gracie Glassmeyer & Justin W. Lo	January 17, 2017	113	0.58

On May 13, 2017, The CW released an epilogue to the series to provide closure after its cancellation.

== Reception ==
=== Critical reception ===
No Tomorrow received generally positive reviews from television critics. On Rotten Tomatoes the season has a rating of 91%. The site's critical consensus reads, "No Tomorrow is a gentle, easy to digest rom-com that serves up a strong supporting cast, charming lead performances, and a hefty dose of fun." On Metacritic, the season has a score of 69 out of 100, based on 23 critics.

The editors of TV Guide placed No Tomorrow eighth among the top ten picks for the most anticipated new shows of the 2016–2017 season. In its review, Sadie Gennis wrote

"Tori Anderson and Joshua Sasse are infectiously charming in this offbeat romantic comedy about a woman who discovers that her dream man is an apocalypse truther. It's a weird premise, sure, but No Tomorrow leans into its own absurdity, populating the show with surreal, strange characters (including one who speaks so quietly he needs subtitles) and delightful prop comedy that is rarely seen in one-hour shows. And while it's unlikely that No Tomorrow will help the CW continue its Golden Globes streak, it fits in perfectly on the network alongside fellow genre-pushing rom-coms Jane the Virgin and Crazy Ex-Girlfriend."

=== Ratings ===
Viewership and ratings per episode of No Tomorrow
No.	Title	Air date	Rating/share (18–49)	Viewers (millions)
1	"Pilot"	October 4, 2016	0.5/2	1.51
2	"No Crying in Baseball"	October 11, 2016	0.2/1	0.74
3	"No Doubt"	October 18, 2016	0.3/1	0.81
4	"No Holds Barred"	October 25, 2016	0.3/1	0.78
5	"No Regrets"	November 1, 2016	0.3/1	0.76
6	"No Debts Remain Unpaid"	November 15, 2016	0.3/1	0.80
7	"No You Say it First"	November 22, 2016	0.3/1	0.80
8	"No Rest for the Weary"	November 29, 2016	0.3/1	0.94
9	"No Truer Words"	December 6, 2016	0.3/1	0.80
10	"No Soup for You"	December 27, 2016	0.2/1	0.60
11	"No Woman No Cry"	January 3, 2017	0.2/1	0.51
12	"No Time Like the Present"	January 10, 2017	0.2/1	0.70
13	"No Sleep 'Til Reykjavik"	January 17, 2017	0.2/1	0.58
