= Predestinado: Arigó e o Espírito do Dr. Fritz =

- Theatrical release poster
- Directed by: Gustavo Fernandez
- Written by: Jaqueline Vargas
- Starring: Danton Mello; Juliana Paes; Marcos Caruso
- Cinematography: Uli Burtin
- Edited by: Renato Lima
- Music by: Gus Bernardo
- Production companies: Moonshot Pictures; FJ Productions; The Calling Production
- Distributed by: Imagem Filmes
- Release date: 1 September 2022
- Country: Brazil
- Language: Portuguese

Predestinado: Arigó e o Espírito do Dr. Fritz is a 2022 Brazilian drama film directed by Gustavo Fernandez and written by Jaqueline Vargas. Inspired by the work Arigo: Surgeon of the Rusty Knife, by John G. Fuller, the film stars Danton Mello and Juliana Paes and tells the story of Zé Arigó, a simple man who became a symbol of hope through his surgeries and spiritual healings.

== Plot ==
José Pedro de Freitas, known as Zé Arigó (Danton Mello), was a simple man who lived in Congonhas, Minas Gerais, with his wife Arlete (Juliana Paes). In the 1950s, a time when spiritualism was not widely known or respected in the country, Arigó became a symbol of hope through his surgeries and spiritual healings. Inspired by a true story, the film portrays how Arigó, with the help of the spirit of Dr. Fritz (James Faulkner), performed countless spiritual surgeries on people in Brazil and around the world.

After suffering from headaches, insomnia and visions, Arigó began to hear voices and dream of an entity that presented itself as Adolph Fritzum, a German doctor who had died during World War I. Initially reluctant to accept the influence of this soul, Arigó ended up giving in to Fritz's wishes, dedicating himself to healing people who needed spiritual surgeries. Despite the disapproval of the Catholic Church and civil authorities, Arigó established a clinic on Marechal Floriano Street, in Congonhas, where he treated up to two hundred people a day free of charge.

== Cast ==
- Danton Mello as José Pedro de Freitas "Zé Arigó"
- Juliana Paes as Arlete André de Freitas
- James Faulkner as Adolph Fritzum "Dr. Fritz"
- Marcos Caruso as Padre Anselmo
- Marco Ricca as Juiz Barros
- Cássio Gabus Mendes as Cícero
- Alexandre Borges as Sen. Lucio Bittencourt
- João Signorelli as Chico Xavier
- Antonio Saboia as Juiz Felipe
- Matheus Fagundes as José Tarcísio de Freitas
- Carlos Meceni as Orlandinho
- Maurício de Barros as Dr. Jair
- João Victor Silva as Sidney de Freitas
- Ravel Cabral as jailer
- Luiz Adelmo Manzano as radio narrator
- Sérgio Cavalcante as Dr. Túlio
- José Trassi as Preto
- Aldo Bueno as Jorge
- Gery Dantas as Eri de Freitas
- Luma Schiavon as tradutora
- Patrick Pereira as Haroldo

== Production ==
=== Development ===
Jaqueline Vargas, the film's screenwriter, conducted interviews with the medium's family members and conducted extensive research in direct sources and several books to develop the original script. One of the main materials used was "Arigó and the Spirit of Dr. Fritz", written by English journalist and writer John G. Fuller. Predestinado is a production of Moonshot Pictures, by Roberto d'Avila, FJ Produções, by Fabio Golombek, and The Calling Production, by James Guyer, with co-production by Paramount Pictures and Camisa Listrada. Predestinado was filmed in the cities of Congonhas, Cataguases and Rio Novo, in Minas Gerais, during the first half of 2018.

== Release ==
The film's commercial premiere took place on September 1, 2022, with distribution in more than 665 movie theaters throughout Brazil.

== Reception ==
Director Gustavo Fernandez, in an interview with GQ Brasil magazine, said that the film "is a respectful biography, but not submissive to the myth of Arigó. It is a film about empathy and fraternity. It is a subject that we need."

Janda Montenegro, on the film website CinePOP, stated that Gustavo Fernandez "imparts humanity to the characters in his film, especially the antagonists" and also highlighted that the "correct" choice of Danton Mello and Juliana Paes for the main roles "highlights their vast experience and gives depth to the characters, while the art and costume production authentically recreates the scenery of Minas Gerais in the 1940s to 1960s, without losing authenticity." Montenegro also says that the film is "provocative" and that it "will surprise even the most skeptical viewers."

Victor Cierro, on the UOL movie website Tangerina, said that "the film, regardless of religion, needs to be seen by Brazilians" and that "the true story of José Arigó is necessary, strong and reflects on prejudice in Brazilian lands. The life of the medium from Minas Gerais deserves the big screen. And, because of its importance, the production is also worthy of streaming: Danton Mello could easily star in a series about the life saver."

Maria Gabrielle, on the website Estação Nerd, stated that "the film is more than a biographical drama or a spiritist film: it is the due national recognition for an important personality of a religion that, had he been born in another country, would be a reason for study, not rejection, as the film itself says."
