= Episode 10 (Tá no Ar) =

- Tá no Ar episode
- Marcelo Adnet (left) and Marcius Melhem (right) in a parody of high class of São Paulo. This sequence was positively received by critics.
- Episode no.: Season 2 Episode 1
- Directed by: Maurício Farias
- Written by: Marcelo Adnet; Marcius Melhem
- Original air date: February 12, 2015
- Running time: 22 minutes

Guest appearances
- Pedro Bial as himself.; Bruno Gagliasso as himself.; Regina Duarte as herself.

Episode chronology
← Previous "Episode 9"	Next → "Episode 11"

The tenth episode of the Brazilian situation comedy Tá no Ar, first of the second season, premiered on the Globo Network on Thursday night, February 12, 2015. It was written by series creators Marcelo Adnet and Marcius Melhem, and directed by Maurício Farias.

This episode received generally positive reviews from critics, particularly for the writing and the parodies, besides music played at the end. According to Ibope, the episode were watched by 4.79 million viewers during their original broadcast in São Paulo and Rio de Janeiro, the two major advertising markets in Brazil.

== Cast ==
Actor/Actress	
Marcelo Adnet	main cast
Marcius Melhem	main cast
Danton Mello	main cast
Carol Portes	main cast
Georgiana Góes	main cast
Luana Martau	main cast
Maurício Rizzo	main cast
Márcio Vito	main cast
Renata Gaspar	main cast
Verônica Debom	main cast
Welder Rodrigues	main cast
Pedro Bial	special guest star
Bruno Gagliasso	special guest star
Regina Duarte	special guest star

== Reception ==
=== Ratings ===
In its original airing on the Globo network, the tenth episode of Tá no Ar acquired a 13.8 Ibope Rating. This indicates that about 978,015 households and 2.6 million viewers watched this episode in Greater São Paulo. In Rio, the second largest advertising market in Brazil, the episode acquired 20.0 Ibope Rating. This means that 845,000 homes and 2.19 million people watched.

=== Critical ===
This episode received generally positive reviews from critics. Renato Kramer, of Folha de S. Paulo, praised the episode, saying "Tá no Ar came back to stay".
