= Anita e Garibaldi =

2013 film directed by Alberto Rondalli

- Theatrical release poster
- Directed by: Alberto Rondalli
- Screenplay by: Alberto Rondalli
- Produced by: R. A. Gennaro; Ricardo Gennaro; Virginia W. Moraes
- Starring: Ana Paula Arósio; Gabriel Braga Nunes; Antonio Buil Pueyo; Hélio Cícero
- Cinematography: Claudio Collepiccolo
- Edited by: Giulia Ciniselli
- Distributed by: Polifilmes
- Release date: December 6, 2013 (Brazil)
- Running time: 98 minutes
- Country: Brazil
- Language: Portuguese

Anita e Garibaldi is a 2013 Brazilian historical drama film directed by Alberto Rondalli. The film follows the arrival of Giuseppe Garibaldi in Brazil, his meeting with Anita Garibaldi and the human and military learning with Luigi Rossetti in the struggle for liberation of the state of Rio Grande do Sul and Santa Catarina of the Brazilian Empire.

== Plot ==
Giuseppe Garibaldi (Gabriel Braga Nunes), 32, commander of the Republican rebels invading Laguna, Santa Catarina, during the Ragamuffin War (1835–1845), finds his soul mate Anita (Ana Paula Arósio), 18, wife of a local shoemaker. Between passion and battles, they define the direction of their lives and influence the course of the revolution.

== Cast ==
- Ana Paula Arósio as Anita
- Gabriel Braga Nunes as Giuseppe Garibaldi
- Antonio Buil Pueyo as Luigi Rossetti
- Paulo Betti as voice of Luigi Rossetti
- Paulo César Pereio as Tio Duarte
- Hélio Cícero as General Canabarro
- Alexandre Rodrigues as Jacinto
- Leonardo Medeiros as Teixeira Nunes
