= Páginas da Vida =

Páginas da Vida may refer to:

- Páginas da Vida (Brazilian TV series), a 2006-2007 Brazilian telenovela
- Páginas da Vida (Portuguese TV series), a 2026 Portuguese telenovela

== See also ==
- Pages of Life (disambiguation)
