= Chef Jack: The Adventurous Cook =

- Theatrical release poster
- Directed by: Guilherme Fiúza Zenha
- Written by: Artur Costa
- Produced by: Giordano Becheleni uiz Fernando de Alencar
- Starring: Danton Mello
- Edited by: João Marinho
- Music by: Bruno Mad
- Production companies: Immagini Animation Studios; Pixel Produções; Ciclus Produções; Solo Filmes
- Distributed by: Sony Pictures; Cineart Filmes
- Release date: January 19, 2023
- Running time: 80 minutes
- Country: Brazil
- Language: Portuguese

Chef Jack: The Adventurous Cook (Portuguese: Chef Jack: O Cozinheiro Aventureiro) is a 2023 Brazilian animated adventure comedy film directed by Guilherme Fiúza Zenha and written by Artur Costa. It stars the voice of Danton Mello. It premiered on January 19, 2023, in Brazilian theaters.

== Synopsis ==
Chef Jack, a young man full of vigor and quite arrogant, travels the world in search of rare ingredients to put into the recipes for the dishes he cooks, at one point he sees an advertisement for a television contest in which he participated in the past with his father, and decides that he will participate again. Of course, for this he needs the ingredients of the dish for which he intends to deliver the best recipe of his life if he advances to the final of the competition, as well as an assistant to help him in the tests and during the preparation of the dishes during the competition in the program.

== Voice cast ==
The actors participating in this film are:

- Danton Mello as Chef Jack
- Rodrigo Waschburger as Leonard
- Cintia Ferrer as Dominica
- Cecilia Fernandes as Bárbara / Lev
- Renan Rammé as Jeremy / Desmond
- Álvaro Rosacosta as Toninho
- Tássia D'Paula as Alice
- Guilherme Briggs as Tiki / Voice Bearer Beaver
- Rejane Faria as Adaeze
- Marisa Rotenberg as Elisa
- Ana Laura Salles as Ndidi
- Renata Corrêa as Juliette / Justine / Yumi
- Carlos Magno Ribeiro as Nazaar
- Giordano Becheleni as Bob
