= Travessia =

- Genre: Telenovela
- Created by: Glória Perez
- Directed by: Mauro Mendonça Filho
- Starring: Lucy Alves; Rômulo Estrela; Chay Suede
- Country of origin: Brazil
- Original language: Portuguese
- No. of seasons: 1
- No. of episodes: 179

Production
- Producers: Claudio Dager; Tatiana Poggi
- Production company: Estúdios Globo

Original release
- Network: TV Globo
- Release: 10 October 2022 – 5 May 2023

Travessia (English title: The Path) is a Brazilian telenovela created by Glória Perez. It is produced and broadcast by TV Globo, and aired from 10 October 2022 to 5 May 2023. The telenovela follows the story of Brisa (Lucy Alves), who sees her life turned upside down when she is the victim of a deepfake. Rômulo Estrela, and Chay Suede also star.

== Cast ==
- Lucy Alves as Brisa Ribeiro
  - Mariah Yohana as child Brisa
- Rômulo Estrela as Oto
- Chay Suede as Ariovaldo "Ari" Fernandes de Souza
  - João Bravo as child Ari
- Drica Moraes as Núbia Fernandes
- Giovanna Antonelli as Heloísa "Helô" Sampaio Viana
- Alessandra Negrini as Guida Sampaio
- Vanessa Giácomo as Leonor "Leo" Sampaio
- Rodrigo Lombardi as André Moretti
- Alexandre Nero as Stênio Alencar
- Cássia Kis as Cidália Bastos
- Humberto Martins as Jorge Luiz Guerra
- Jade Picon as Chiara Rossi Guerra
- Dandara Mariana as Talita
- Marcos Caruso as Dante
- Luci Pereira as Creusa "Creuzita" Macedo Matos
- Ana Lúcia Torre as Maria Luiza Sampaio "Cotinha"
- Noémia Costa as Inácia
- Otávio Müller
- Indira Nascimento as Laís
- Aílton Graça as Monteiro
- Guilherme Cabral as Rudá Sampaio
- Rafael Losso as Gil
- Renata Tobelem as Dina
- Camila Rocha as Tininha
  - Gabriely Mota as child Tininha
- Yohama Eshima as Yone
- Nathalia Falcão as Júlia
- Dudha Moreira as Cema
- Danielle Olimpia as Karina
- Priscila Vilela as Adalgisa
- Aoxi as Silene
- Flávia Reis as Marineide
- Bel Kutner as Lídia
- Raul Gazolla as Van Damme
- Nando Cunha as Joel
- Orã Figueiredo as Nunes
- Leona Santos as Belle
- Iago Pires as Espeto
- Duda Santos as Isa
- Mariana Consoli
- Aliny Ulbricht
- Marcos Holanda
- João Cunha
- Rafael Telles
- Vicente Alvite as Tonho
- Claudia Mauro as Pilar

=== Guest stars ===
- Grazi Massafera as Débora Bittencourt
- Simão Fumega
- Viviane de Assis

== Production ==
Travessia was initially scheduled to premiere in 2023, replacing Todas as Flores in the 9pm time-slot, however, it was later announced that Todas as Flores would be released on the Globoplay streaming service and Travessia would premiere following Pantanal. Filming of the telenovela began on 4 July 2022. The first teaser was shown on 5 September 2022.

== Ratings ==
Season	Episodes	First aired		Last aired		Avg. viewers (points)
Season	Episodes	Date	Viewers (points)	Date	Viewers (points)	Avg. viewers (points)
1	179	10 October 2022	25.9	5 May 2023	29.2	24.2
