= Tempos Modernos =

- Genre: Telenovela; Science fiction
- Created by: Bosco Brasil
- Written by: Izabel de Oliveira; Maria Elisa Berredo; Mário Teixeira; Patrícia Moretzsohn
- Directed by: José Luiz Villamarim
- Starring: Fernanda Vasconcellos; Thiago Rodrigues; Priscila Fantin; Danton Mello; Antônio Fagundes; Eliane Giardini; Marcos Caruso; Regiane Alves; Vivianne Pasmanter; Felipe Camargo; Otávio Müller; Malu Galli; Guilherme Weber; Alessandra Maestrini; Leonardo Medeiros
- Opening theme: "Cérebro Eletrônico" by Myllena Varginha
- Country of origin: Brazil
- Original language: Portuguese
- No. of episodes: 161

Production
- Camera setup: Multi-camera

Original release
- Network: TV Globo
- Release: 11 January – 16 July 2010

Tempos Modernos (English: Modern Times) is a Brazilian telenovela produced and broadcast by TV Globo. It premiered on 11 January 2010, replacing Caras & Bocas, and ended on 16 July 2010, replaced by Ti Ti Ti. The series is written by Bosco Brasil, with the collaboration of Izabel de Oliveira, Maria Elisa Berredo, Mário Teixeira and Patrícia Moretzsohn.

It stars Fernanda Vasconcellos, Thiago Rodrigues, Antônio Fagundes, and Eliane Giardini. Priscila Fantin, Danton Mello, Marcos Caruso, Regiane Alves, Vivianne Pasmanter, Otávio Muller, Felipe Camargo, and Malu Galli also star in main roles.

== Cast ==
- Fernanda Vasconcellos as Cornélia Cordeiro Santos Reis "Nelinha"
- Thiago Rodrigues as José Carlos Pimenta Cordeiro "Zeca"
- Antônio Fagundes as Leal Cordeiro
- Eliane Giardini as Hélia Pimenta
- Priscila Fantin as Nara Nolasco
- Marcos Caruso as Otto Niemann
- Vivianne Pasmanter as Regiane Cordeiro Mourão
- Regiane Alves as Goretti Cordeiro Bodanski "Gô"
- Otávio Muller as Altemir Assunção da Paz Bodanski (Bodanski)
- Felipe Camargo as Vinícius Porto de Mello "Portinho"
- Danton Mello as Renato Vieira de Mattos
- Alessandra Maestrini as Benedita Kusnezov Piñon "Dita'"
- Leonardo Medeiros as Ramon Piñon
- Guilherme Weber as Albano Mourão
- Grazi Massafera as Deodora Madureira Niemann / N. Anne
- Malu Galli as Iolanda Paranhos
- Guilherme Leicam as Led Piñon
- Aline Peixoto as Jannis Piñon
- Caroline Abras as Katrina
- João Baldasserini as Túlio Osório
- Débora Duarte as Tertuliana "Tertu"
- Otávio Augusto as Faustaço Lumbriga
- Selma Egrei as Tamara Palumbo
- Genézio de Barros as Pasquale
- Paula Possani as Maureen Lobianco
- Ricardo Blat as Fidélio
- Pascoal da Conceição as Zuppo
- Tuna Dwek as Justine
- Jairo Mattos as Gaulês "Jean Paul"
- Luciana Borghi as Bárbara Lee
- Cris Vianna as Tita Bicalho
- Edmilson Barros as Lindomar Mariano Assunção
- Cláudia Missura as Lavínia Palumbo
- Victor Pecoraro as Ricardo Maurício "Maurição"
- Naruna Costa as Dolores Damasceno
- Antônio Fragoso as Zapata
- Fabrício Boliveira as Nabuco Mota
- Eliana Pittman as Miranda Paranhos
- Márcio Seixas as Frankenstein "Frank" (voice)
- Joana Lerner as Heloísa "Helô"
- Darlan Cunha as João Carlos Paranhos "Joca"
- Janaína Ávila as Milena Morgado
- Anderson Lau as Okuda
- Alexandra Martins as Dulcinólia Lumbriga "Duba"
- Paulo Leal de Melo as Raulzão "Ducha Fria"
- Cássio Inácio as Tartana
- Gilberto Miranda as Madrugadinha
- Rafa Martins as Max do Cavaco
- Isabel Lobo as Thaís Trancoso
- Alexandre Cioletti as Valvênio
- Xandy Britto as Nelsinho Pallotti
- Polliana Aleixo as Maria Eunice Cordeiro Bodanski
- Ana Karolina Lannes as Maria Eugênia Cordeiro Bodanski
- Rebeca Orestein as Maria Helena Cordeiro Bodanski
- Jenifer de Oliveira Andrade as Maria Clara Cordeiro Bodanski
