= Jade Picon =

Brazilian social media personality (born 2001)

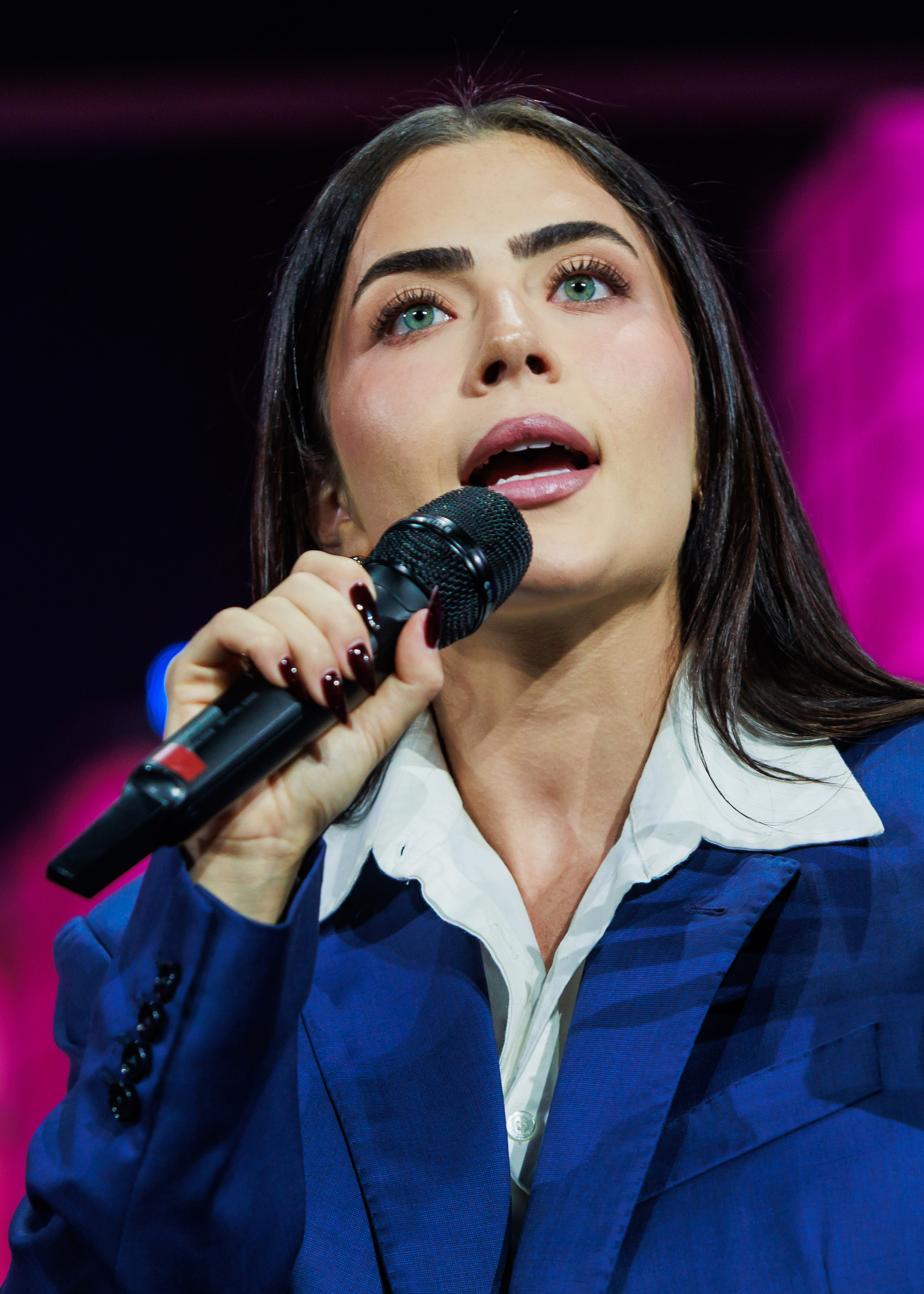
- Picon in 2026
- Born: Jade Picón Froes; 24 September 2001 (age 25); São Paulo, Brazil
- Occupations: Influencer; businesswoman
- Years active: 2016–present

Instagram information
- Page: jadepicon
- Years active: 2012–present
- Followers: 21.9 million

TikTok information
- Page: jadepicon
- Followers: 10.7 million

YouTube information
- Channel: Jade Picon
- Years active: 2017–2022
- Genres: Beauty; vlog
- Subscribers: 2.7 million
- Views: 98.1 million

Jade Picón Froes (Brazilian Portuguese: [ˈʒadʒi piˈkõ]; born 24 September 2001) is a Brazilian social media personality. She rose to prominence in the mid-2010s after appearing in viral social media videos with her brother Leo Picon. In early 2022, Picon was a houseguest on the twenty-second season of Big Brother Brasil. Later that year, she made her acting debut as Chiara Guerra in the Brazilian telenovela Travessia.

== Life and career ==
Picon was born in the city of São Paulo on 24 September 2001, the youngest daughter of Carlos Picon, a businessman, and Monica Santini Froes, an agronomist. Her brother, Léo Picon, is a digital influencer, who was born in 1996. Jade made appearances in videos and posts made by her brother on Orkut and YouTube, which went viral. Over the years had also gained millions of followers on his social networks. In 2019, she launched a clothing brand by the name of Jade² (also stylized as JadeJade).

In 2022, she was chosen for the twenty-second season of Big Brother Brazil. One of the participants of the "Celebrity" group, which brings together celebrities (already known in the media and by the public) invited directly by the program's team. She was the 7th eliminated from the cast; receiving 84.93% of the public eviction votes. She is considered one of the most disliked contestants in the history of Big Brother Brazil; with viewers perceiving her as haughty and conceited. Following Big Brother, she made her acting debut after being cast as Chiara Guerra in TV Globo's telenovela 'Travessia'. There were criticisms around her casting and lack of experience. In 2025, she was cast on Globo's first vertical soap opera 'Tudo Por Uma Segunda Chance' and once again was subject to criticism regarding her performance and acting abilities.

== Filmography ==
Year	Title	Role	Notes	Ref.
2022	Big Brother Brasil	Herself (14th place)	Season 22	
2022	Travessia	Chiara Rossi Guerra		
2024	Mania de Você	Herself	Episode: "14 October"	
2025	Cinco Júlias	Júlia 2		
2025	Tudo Por Uma Segunda Chance	Soraia		

== Awards and nominations ==
Year	Award	Category	Nominee(s)	Result	Ref.
2018	Meus Prêmios Nick	Gata Trendy	Jade Picon	Won	
2018	Meus Prêmios Nick	Instagram Favorito	Jade Picon	Won	
2020	Capricho Awards	Melhor Casal (with João Guilherme Ávila)	Jade Picon	Won	
2020	Capricho Awards	Moda e Beleza	Jade Picon	Won	
2020	Meus Prêmios Nick	Ship do Ano (com João Guilherme)	Jade Picon	Won	
2022	MTV Millennial Awards Brazil	Dupla de Milhões (com Léo Picon)	Jade Picon	Won	
2022	Ibest Awards	Influenciador São Paulo	Jade Picon	1º lugar	
2022	Prêmio Jovem Brasileiro	Influencer Fitness	Jade Picon	Won	
2022	Prêmio Jovem Brasileiro	Melhor Participante de Reality	Jade Picon	Won	
2022	Prêmio Jovem Brasileiro	O Jovem Mais Estiloso do Brasil	Jade Picon	Won	
2022	Prêmio Jovem Brasileiro	Rainha do Insta	Jade Picon	Won	
2022	Prêmio RedeBBB	Ship de Milhões (com Paulo André)	Jade Picon	Won	
2022	SEC Awards	Estrela em Reality Show	Jade Picon	Won	
2022	SEC Awards	Influencer do Ano	Jade Picon	Won	
