= Tá no Ar =

Television series

- Also known as: Tá no Ar: a TV na TV
- Genre: Sitcom; Satire; Sketch comedy
- Created by: Marcelo Adnet; Marcius Melhem; Maurício Farias
- Opening theme: "Televisão" by Titãs
- Country of origin: Brazil
- Original language: Portuguese
- No. of seasons: 6
- No. of episodes: 68

Production
- Camera setup: Multi-camera
- Running time: 22 minutes
- Production company: Esúdios Globo

Original release
- Network: Rede Globo
- Release: April 10, 2014 – April 9, 2019

Related
- TV Pirata

Tá no Ar: a TV na TV (or simply Tá no Ar) was a Brazilian sitcom created by Marcelo Adnet, Marcius Melhem and Maurício Farias for Rede Globo. The series satirizes some Brazilian television programs, including the other stations. The series was written by Adnet and Melhem, with Farias directing. Since its debut, Tá no Ar was well received by critics and having great repercussion on internet

== Production ==
=== Development ===
"Marcius was very generous to me. He's a guy who knows much better than I the station [sic]. He gave me a lot of freedom to be who I am."
—Marcelo Adnet about the "help" that Marcius gave him.

On January 28, 2013, comedian Marcelo Adnet is hired by TV Globo, after leaving the MTV Brasil.

His first program, O Dentista Mascarado, created by Fernanda Young and Alexandre Machado, had low ratings, which resulted in its cancellation after 12 episodes. After the end of the program, Adnet was added to the cast of Fantástico, producing parody and entertainment blocks. However, he eventually left the program later.

Later, TV Globo asked Marcius Melhem, who had just finished Os Caras de Pau, to produce a comedy show starring Adnet. Melhem created a sketch comedy program, but with a different style from the other programs of this format in Brazil, very similar to TV Pirata, satirical series that made a big success on TV Globo in the 80's.

Globo is well known for not citing programs of other stations. About this "policy" Adnet said: "[...] that was never a problem. [...]"

=== Release ===
The series was officially launched by TV Globo on April 2, 2014, during the "vem_aí" event in which the broadcaster launches its programming. The program was announced by Adnet himself.

For the 2014 season, Globo climbed A Grande Família and Doce de Mãe/A Segunda Dama to compose the Thursday night grid. The premiere took place on the third slot of shows, which is usually shown between 11:30 PM—12:30 AM.

== Cast ==
Actor/Actress
Marcelo Adnet
Marcius Melhem
Danton Mello
Carol Portes
Georgiana Góes
Luana Martau
Maurício Rizzo
Márcio Vito
Renata Gaspar
Verônica Debom
Welder Rodrigues

== Episodes ==
=== Season 1 (2014) ===
No. overall	No. in series	Title	Directed by	Written by	Original release date	IBOPE rating
1	1	"Episode 1"	Maurício Farias	Marcius Melhem & Marcelo Adnet	April 10, 2014	10.0
2	2	"Episode 2"	Maurício Farias	Marcius Melhem & Marcelo Adnet	April 17, 2014	11.2
3	3	"Episode 3"	Maurício Farias	Marcius Melhem & Marcelo Adnet	April 24, 2014	8.8
4	4	"Episode 4"	Maurício Farias	Marcius Melhem & Marcelo Adnet	May 1, 2014	9.0
5	5	"Episode 5"	Maurício Farias	Marcius Melhem & Marcelo Adnet	May 8, 2014	9.0
6	6	"Episode 6"	Maurício Farias	Marcius Melhem & Marcelo Adnet	May 15, 2014	9.8
7	7	"Episode 7"	Maurício Farias	Marcius Melhem & Marcelo Adnet	May 22, 2014	8.2
8	8	"Episode 8"	Maurício Farias	Marcius Melhem & Marcelo Adnet	May 29, 2014	7.8
9	9	"Episode 9"	Maurício Farias	Marcius Melhem & Marcelo Adnet	June 5, 2014	9.2

=== Season 2 (2015) ===
No. overall	No. in series	Title	Directed by	Written by	Original release date	IBOPE rating
10	1	"Episode 10"	Maurício Farias	Marcius Melhem & Marcelo Adnet	February 12, 2015	13.8
11	2	"Episode 11"	Maurício Farias	Marcius Melhem & Marcelo Adnet	February 19, 2015	15.0
12	3	"Episode 12"	Maurício Farias	Marcius Melhem & Marcelo Adnet	February 26, 2015	11.0
13	4	"Episode 13"	Maurício Farias	Marcius Melhem & Marcelo Adnet	March 5, 2015	13.3
14	5	"Episode 14"	Maurício Farias	Marcius Melhem & Marcelo Adnet	March 12, 2015	12.3
15	6	"Episode 15"	Maurício Farias	Marcius Melhem & Marcelo Adnet	March 19, 2015	12.2
16	7	"Episode 16"	Maurício Farias	Marcius Melhem & Marcelo Adnet	March 26, 2015	10.8
17	8	"Episode 17"	Maurício Farias	Marcius Melhem & Marcelo Adnet	April 2, 2015	13.3
18	9	"Episode 18"	Maurício Farias	Marcius Melhem & Marcelo Adnet	April 9, 2015	10.8
19	10	"Episode 19"	Maurício Farias	Marcius Melhem & Marcelo Adnet	April 16, 2015	12.3

=== Season 3 (2016) ===
No. overall	No. in series	Title	Directed by	Written by	Original release date	IBOPE rating
20	1	"Episode 20"	Maurício Farias	Marcius Melhem & Marcelo Adnet	January 19, 2016	14.1
21	2	"Episode 21"	Maurício Farias	Marcius Melhem & Marcelo Adnet	January 26, 2016	14.3
22	3	"Episode 22"	Maurício Farias	Marcius Melhem & Marcelo Adnet	February 2, 2016	15.4
23	4	"Episode 23"	Maurício Farias	Marcius Melhem & Marcelo Adnet	February 9, 2016	16.1
24	5	"Episode 24"	Maurício Farias	Marcius Melhem & Marcelo Adnet	February 16, 2016	13.8
25	6	"Episode 25"	Maurício Farias	Marcius Melhem & Marcelo Adnet	February 23, 2016	14.2
26	7	"Episode 26"	Maurício Farias	Marcius Melhem & Marcelo Adnet	March 1, 2016	16.3
27	8	"Episode 27"	Maurício Farias	Marcius Melhem & Marcelo Adnet	March 8, 2016	15.8
28	9	"Episode 28"	Maurício Farias	Marcius Melhem & Marcelo Adnet	March 15, 2016	14.2
29	10	"Episode 29"	Maurício Farias	Marcius Melhem & Marcelo Adnet	March 22, 2016	14.1
30	11	"Episode 30"	Maurício Farias	Marcius Melhem & Marcelo Adnet	March 29, 2016	10.4
31	12	"Episode 31"	Maurício Farias	Marcius Melhem & Marcelo Adnet	April 5, 2016	17.2

=== Season 4 (2017) ===
No. overall	No. in series	Title	Directed by	Written by	Original release date	IBOPE rating
32	1	"Episode 32"	Maurício Farias	Marcius Melhem & Marcelo Adnet	January 24, 2017	16.1
33	2	"Episode 33"	Maurício Farias	Marcius Melhem & Marcelo Adnet	January 31, 2017	15.5

== Reception ==
=== Ratings ===
In the 2014 season, the main program of TV Globo, the 9PM telenovela (at the time, "Em Família"), had been recording lousy viewing figures, a large rejection of the public and critics, creating a "domino effect". The shows was directly affected, and long-standing programs such as A Grande Família hit historic negative record ratings.

The show's debut recorded 10 rating points in IBOPE, considering the measurement to São Paulo, and 11 points in Rio, the two major advertising markets in Brazil. This hearing is considered "satisfactory". Despite the good start, the ratings ebbed and flowed, and the program was in second place in its exhibition schedule sometimes. The average of the first season was 9.2 points.

Season	Timeslot (BRT)	Episodes	Premiered		Ended		TV Season	Rank	Ibope Rating
Season	Timeslot (BRT)	Episodes	Date	Premiere Rating	Date	Finale Rating	TV Season	Rank	Ibope Rating
1	Thursday 11:30 PM	9	April 10, 2014	10	June 5, 2014	9.2	2014	+50	9.2
2	Thursday 11:30 PM	9	February 12, 2015	13.8	April 16, 2015	12.3	2015	+20	13.8
3	Tuesday 11:30 PM	12	January 19, 2016	14.1	April 5, 2016	17.2	2016	16th	14.6

=== Critical ===
The debut of the series was well received by critics. Fernando Oliveira, of R7, labeled it "best premiere", and highlighted the satires and references to other programs. Mauricio Stycer, of Universo Online (UOL), was positive, and highlighted the parody of a northeastern activist.

=== Awards and nominations ===
Year	Award	Category	Nominee	Result
2014	Prêmio F5	Program of the Year	Tá no Ar	Nominated
2017	45th International Emmy Awards	Best Comedy	Tá no Ar	Nominated
