= Rio Novo, Minas Gerais =

Coordinates: 21°27′28″S 43°07′30″W

Rio Novo
- Municipality
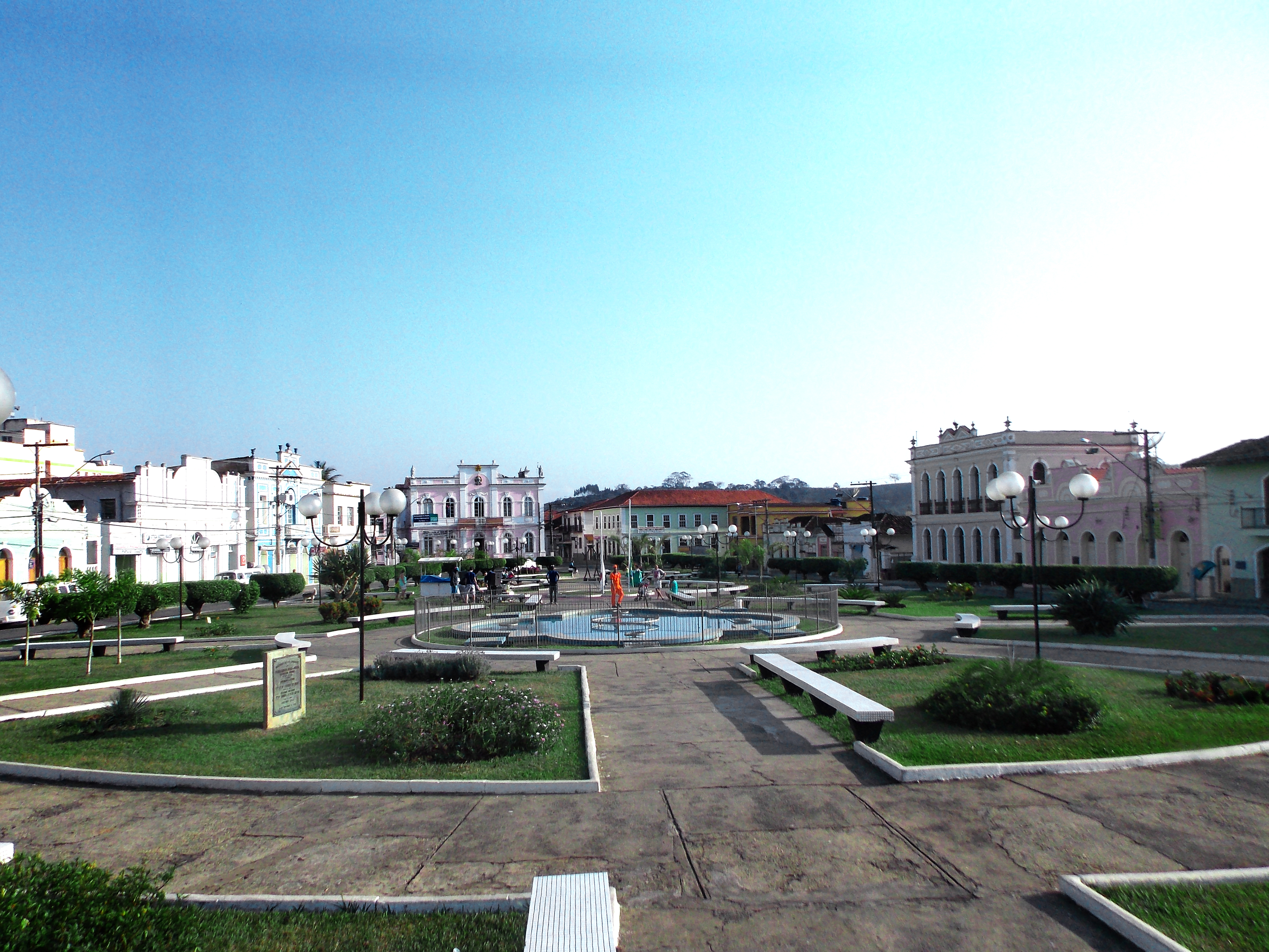

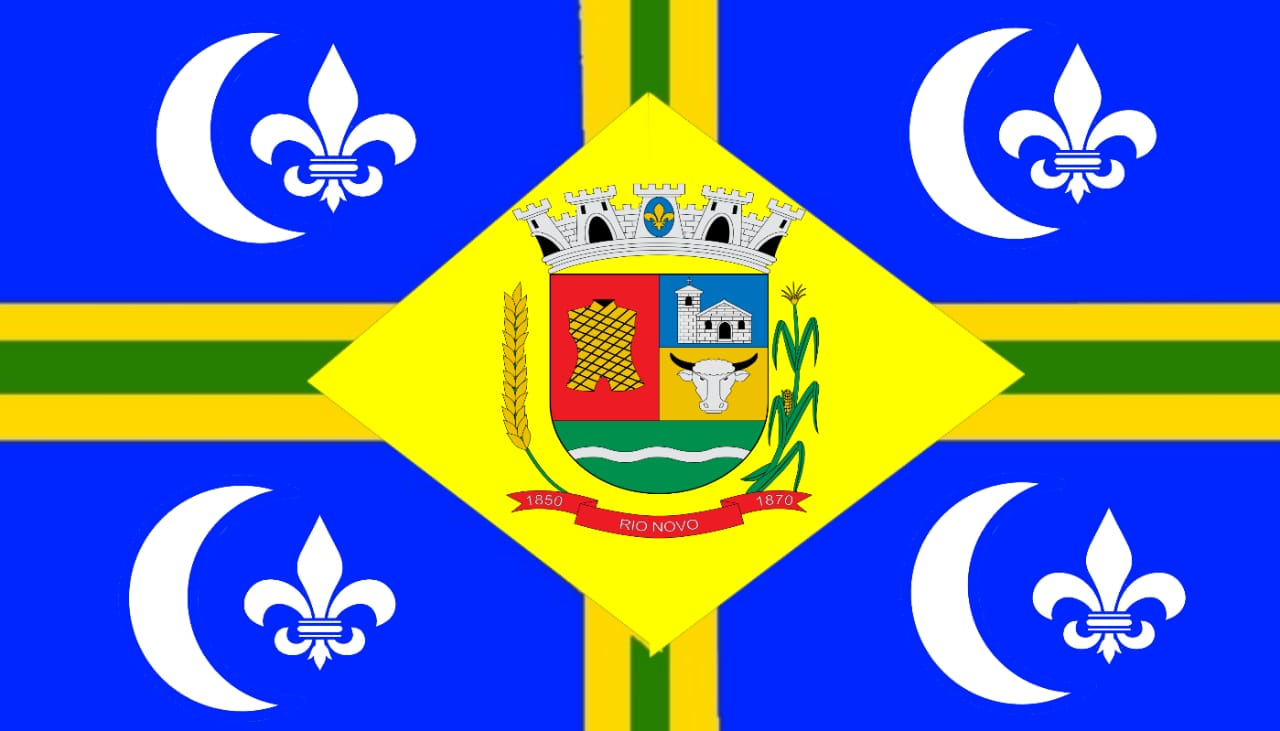
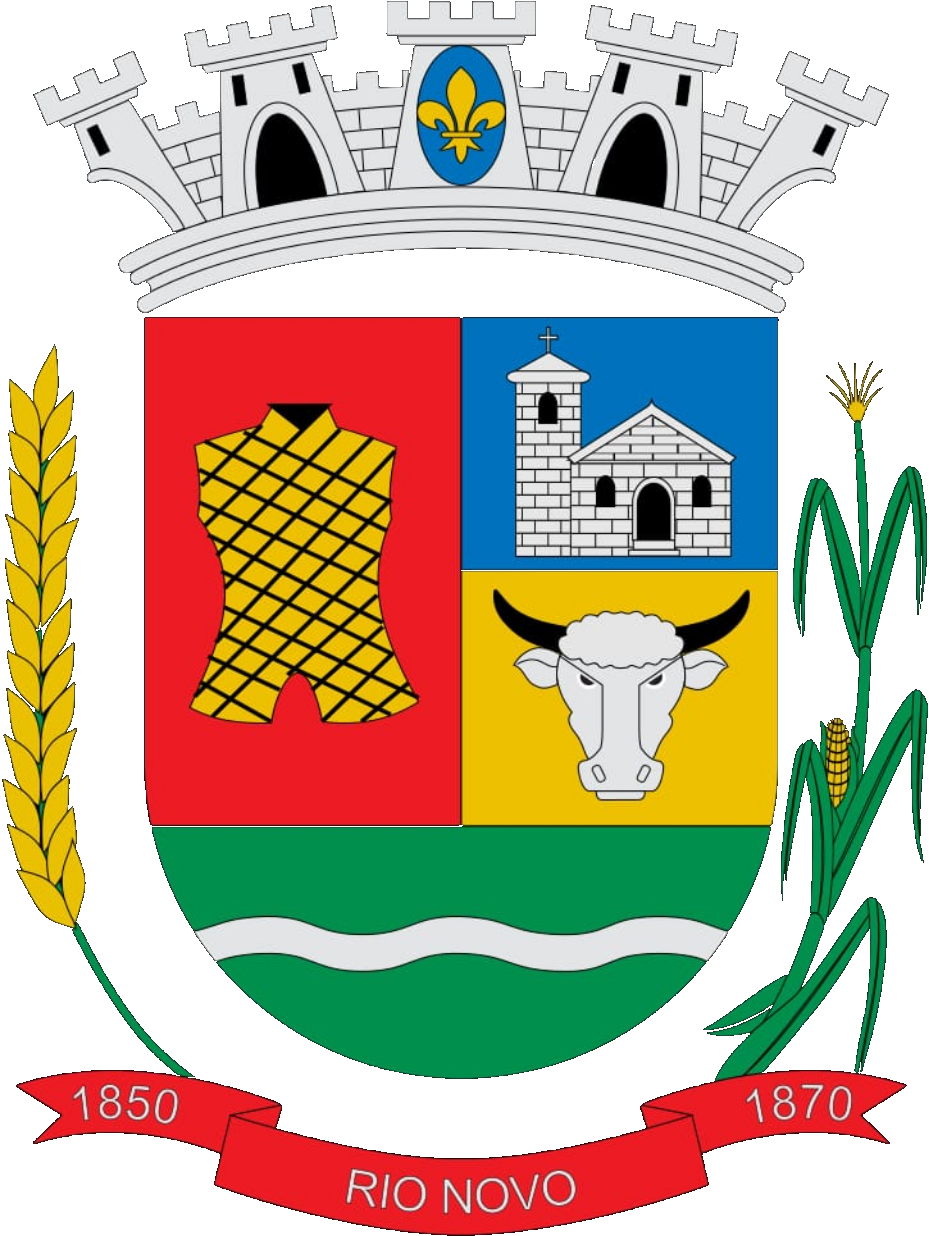
- Flag Coat of arms
- Interactive map of Rio Novo
- Country: Brazil
- Region: Southeast
- State: Minas Gerais
- Mesoregion: Vale do Rio Doce

Population (2020)
  - Total: 8,957
- Time zone: UTC−3 (BRT)

Rio Novo, Minas Gerais is a municipality in the state of Minas Gerais in the Southeast region of Brazil. Part of Presidente Itamar Franco Airport is within the municipality, the remainder being in Goianá.

== See also ==
- List of municipalities in Minas Gerais
