= Marcos Caruso =

Brazilian actor, writer and director

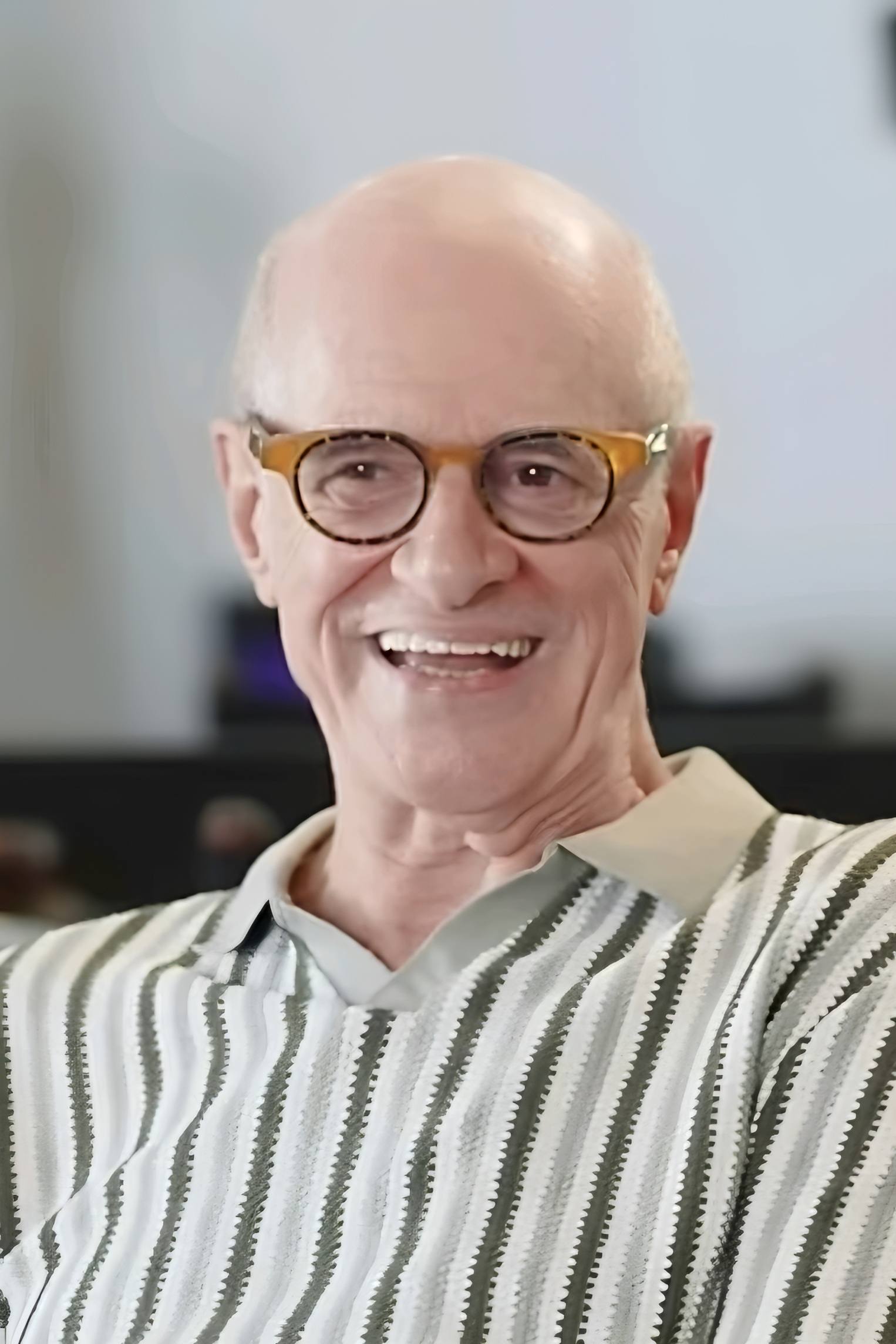
- Caruso in 2024
- Born: Marcos Vianna Caruso; 22 February 1952 (age 74); São Paulo, Brazil
- Occupations: Actor; writer; director
- Years active: 1972–present
- Spouse: Jussara Freire (m. 1974; div. 1994)
- Children: Mari Caruso; Caetano Caruso

Marcos Vianna Caruso (born 22 February 1952) is a Brazilian actor, screenwriter, playwright, and stage director.

He graduated in Law from the Law School of Largo de São Francisco. He is the author of several plays written in partnership with the actress and author Jandira Martini.

He was married for twenty years to the actress Jussara Freire, mother of his two children: Caetano Caruso and Mari Caruso.

His first work as an author was an adaptation of a work by Monteiro Lobato for a TV Globo show.

== Filmography ==
=== Film ===
Year	Title	Role	Notes
1978	O Bem Dotado - O Homem de Itu		
1979	Viúvas Precisam de Consolo		
1996	Um Céu de Estrelas		
2001	Memórias Póstumas	Quincas Borba	
2002	Lara	Apresentador da Rádio	
2004	Capital Circulante		
2005	Depois Daquele Baile	Otávio	
2006	Irma Vap - O Retorno	Otávio Gonçalves	
2008	Polaróides Urbanas	Adalberto	
2011	Cilada.com	Camargo	
2012	O Diário de Tati	Father of Tati	
2014	Sorria, Você Está Sendo Filmado	Real estate agent	
2015	Operações Especiais	Fróes	
2015	O Escaravelho do Diabo	Pimentel	
2016	Desculpe o Transtorno	Miguel	
2018	Crô em Família	Seu Peru	
2022	Predestinado: Arigó e o Espírito do Dr. Fritz	Padre Anselmo	

=== Television ===
Year	Title	Role	Notes
1978	Aritana	Marcolino	
1978	Roda de Fogo		
1981	Floradas na Serra	Gumercindo Cordeiro Leitão	
1981	Vento do Mar Aberto	Rafael	
1982	A Filha do Silêncio		
1984	Jerônimo	Dr. Otoniel	
1990	Pantanal	Tião	
1990	O Canto das Sereias	Hélio	
1990	A História de Ana Raio e Zé Trovão	Locutor de rodeios	
1991	O Fantasma da Ópera	Ronald Figueiredo	
1994	Éramos Seis	Virgulino	
1995	Sangue do Meu Sangue	Conde Giorgio de La Fontana	
1998	Serras Azuis	Dr. Rivaldino Paleólogo	
2001	Presença de Anita	Gonzaga	
2002	Coração de Estudante	Dr. Raul Gouvêia	
2003	Mulheres Apaixonadas	Carlão (Carlos de Souza Duarte)	
2004	Como uma Onda	Dr. Prata	
2005	Sob Nova Direção	Ivan Pitanga	
2006	Páginas da Vida	Alex (Alexandre Flores)	
2007	Desejo Proibido	Padre Inácio Gouvêia	
2008	Casos e Acasos	Adauto	
2008	Três Irmãs	Dr. Alcides Áquila	
2009	Dilemas de Irene	Seu Cléber	
2010	Tempos Modernos	Otto Niemann	
2010	O Relógio da Aventura	Neco	
2011	Cordel Encantado	Patácio Peixoto	
2012	Avenida Brasil	Leleco Araújo	
2013	O Canto da Sereia	Juracy Bandeira	
2014	Joia Rara	Arlindo Pacheco	
2015	A Regra do Jogo	Feliciano Stewart	
2017	Pega Pega	Pedro Guimarães	
2018	O Sétimo Guardião	Sóstenes Vidal	
2020	Éramos Seis	Prefeito Moysés	
2021	Quanto Mais Vida, Melhor!	Osvaldo	
2022	Travessia	Dante	
2023	Elas por Elas	Sérgio	
2026	Coração Acelerado	Dr. Alaor Sampaio Amaral	

== Author ==
=== Television ===
Year	Title	Notes
1981	Casa de Irene	
1981	Dona Santa	
1982	A Filha do Silêncio	
1982	Campeão	
1983	Braço de Ferro	
1990	A História de Ana Raio e Zé Trovão	principal author
1996	Brava Gente	in partnership with Jandira Martini

=== Cinema ===
Year	Title	Notes
1992	Sua Excelência o Candidato	
2005	O Casamento de Romeu e Julieta	
2006	Trair e Coçar É só Começar	
