= Laura Malin =

Brazilian writer

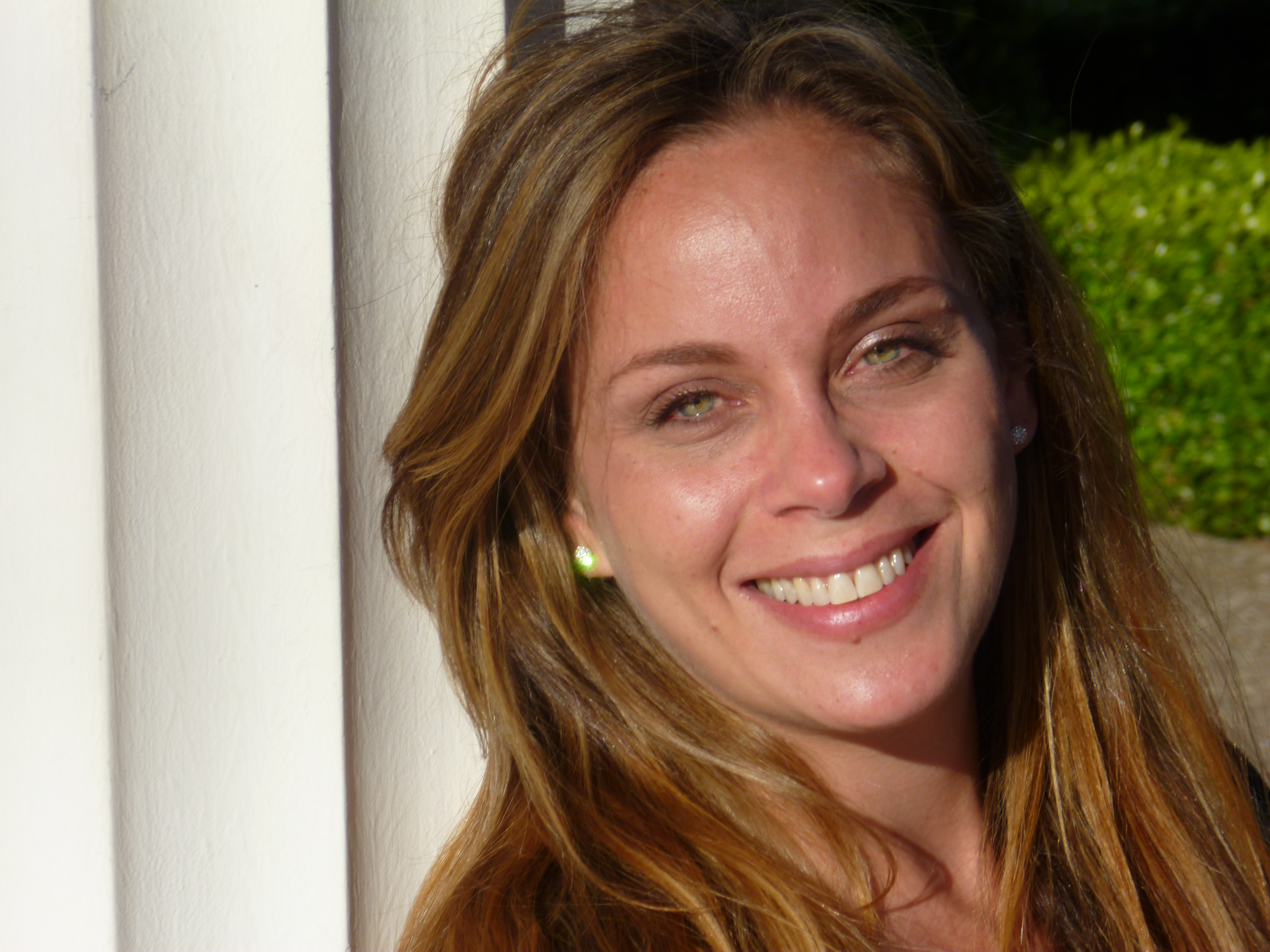
- Born: Laura Malin; April 27, 1974 (age 52) Rio de Janeiro, Brazil
- Occupation: Author, screenwriter, consultant
- Genre: Fiction, biography, script
- Spouse: Danton Mello (m. 1993–2005)

Website
- www.lauramalin.com www.malinentertainment.com

Laura Malin (born April 27, 1974) is a Brazilian-American writer and entertainment consultant. She has written novels, biographies, television & film scripts. Since 1997, when she founded her consulting company ‘Malin Entertainment’, Laura has also been working as a development executive, script doctor and creative mentor.

== Early life and career ==
Laura Malin was born in Rio de Janeiro in 1974, the only child of Ana Maria B. Malin and Mauro Malin. When she was one year old, they moved to Santa Barbara, California, and then to Paris. They returned to Brazil in 1979. Laura wrote her first (still unpublished) book in 1985 "The Case of the Punjabi List" to give as a Christmas present to her family.

Aged 15 she spent the summer in a kibbutz, in Israel, and the following year she returned to France to pursue her studies in French literature. Once there, she developed an interest in cinema while attending the Cannes Film Festival. In 1997, she graduated in Journalism from the Catholic University of Rio de Janeiro.

During the early 1990s, she worked as a translator and journalist. Laura's first job as a reporter was at Jornal do Brasil while still at university, in 1993. She remained away from the field for some 20 years, until she briefly work at Globo Network’s Journalism Department in 2012.

In 1998, she moved back to California to study writing and screenwriting at UC Berkeley. After completing her courses she moved to Los Angeles for two years, and then back to Brazil in 2000.

== TV ==
As a showrunner, screenwriter, creative producer and script-doctor, Malin has a broad experience acquired over more than 25 years since her beginnings. Malin's first big hit happened when she created and showrunned Turma do Gueto (Rede Record). The TV drama series, a revolutionary project about the "street favelas," was an instant hit.In 2005, Laura collaborated in the creation that lasted for six seasons and was aired on cable channel Multishow and later as part of Globo Network primetime magazine Fantástico.

Over the years, Malin wrote and collaborated in dozens of TV series, mini-series, soap-operas, docuseries and television shows.

Laura Malin is a jury member for the Emmy International Awards, Sir Peter Ustinov Television Scriptwriting Award, International Emmy Awards

== Film ==
Over the years, Malin script-doctored, collaborated, wrote, executive produced, distributed, and co-wrote more than 50 produced films. In the US, the writer had the pleasure to work with director Stephen Hopkins, director Eric Eason, producer Richie Salvatore, director Fruit Chan and screenwriter Steve Anderson.

Malin also works with film financing and distribution, her latest highlights include domestic distribution of 1982, by Oualid Mouaness and funds for Monica, by Andrea Pallaoro.

== Book author ==
Aged 30, Laura published her first novel, Julio & Juliano, a thriller drama set up in Rio de Janeiro. Her second book, a biography about Brazilian actress Débora Duarte, came eight years later. In 2011 she released Livro de Joaquim, the first book of the epic saga Tempo Perdido. In 2013, the second volume came out, Livro de Leah. The same year Laura also released a biography about the top model Luiza Brunet. Her first children's book, Nada D+, written with singer Gabriel O Pensador, was released in 2020. Laura is writing a book about the J. Sisters.

== Malin Entertainment ==
Founded by Malin in 1997, Malin Entertainment is an consulting company. Always striving for female leadership, equality and diversity, the company have sought teams composed primarily by women.

In 25 years working with the entertainment industry, Malin Entertainment has created lasting professional relationships with Brazilian and international clients based in the U.S., Latin America, Angola, France and Portugal.

Initially incorporated in 1997, in São Paulo as Trilogia Films, the company later on expanded to Rio de Janeiro in 2009 and had its name changed to Tapiz Communications. Finally, in 2014, it set foot in Los Angeles and gained the current title of Malin Entertainment.

== Personal life ==
Laura Malin has two daughters, Luisa (2001) and Alice (2003), from her relationship with Brazilian actor Danton Mello.
