= Como Aproveitar o Fim do Mundo =

2012 Brazilian television series

- Genre: Comedy
- Created by: Fernanda Young; Alexandre Machado
- Directed by: José Alvarenga Jr.
- Starring: Alinne Moraes; Danton Mello; Nelson Freitas
- Opening theme: "Está Chegando a Hora" by Wilson Simonal
- Country of origin: Brazil
- Original language: Portuguese
- No. of seasons: 1
- No. of episodes: 8

Production
- Running time: 45 minutes
- Production company: Estúdios Globo

Original release
- Network: Rede Globo
- Release: November 1 – December 20, 2012

Related
- No Tomorrow

Como Aproveitar o Fim do Mundo (English: How to Enjoy the End of the World) is a Brazilian comedy television series created by Fernanda Young and Alexandre Machado. It was produced and aired by Globo from November 1 to December 20, 2012, consisting of eight episodes.

In 2013, the series was released on DVD in a unique edition, in film format, originally imagined by director José Alvarenga Jr.

In 2016, an American remake of the series, titled No Tomorrow was developed by Corinne Brinkerhoff, and aired on The CW.

Como Aproveitar o Fim do Mundo was nominated for an International Emmy in 2013.

== Plot ==
A woman sets off on a journey to enjoy her life at the most, believing the apocalypse will occur on December 21, 2012, while trying to explain it to her skeptic colleague.

== Cast and characters ==
=== Main ===
- Alinne Moraes as Kátia Dornellas
- Danton Mello as Ernani da Silva
- Nelson Freitas as Ramon (Raposo)

=== Recurring ===
- Alberto Brigadeiro
- Ângela Rabelo as Elza
- Alejandro Claveaux as Leandro
- Carlos Capeletti
- Carolina Taulois as Carla
- Eduardo Mancini as Bêbado
- Fernando Dias
- Jorge Cerruti
- José Araújo
- Keli Freitas as Regina
- Luiz Serra as Seu Osmar
- Maria Eduarda as Silvia
- Martha Nowill as Letícia
- Regina Sampaio as Esther de Azevedo
- Rodrigo Rangel

== Episodes ==
No.	Title	Air date
1	"O Começo do Fim"	November 1, 2012
2	"Está na Hora de Dizer que Eu Te Amo"	November 8, 2012
3	"Nem Tudo É o que Parece Ser"	November 15, 2012
4	"Com Alguma Coisa em Comum"	November 22, 2012
5	"Está na Hora de Dizer Eu Te Amo"	November 29, 2012
6	"Acertando as Contas"	December 6, 2012
7	"Hora de Chutar o Balde"	December 13, 2012
8	"As Últimas 24 Horas"	December 20, 2012
