= Ana Paula Arósio =

Brazilian model and actress

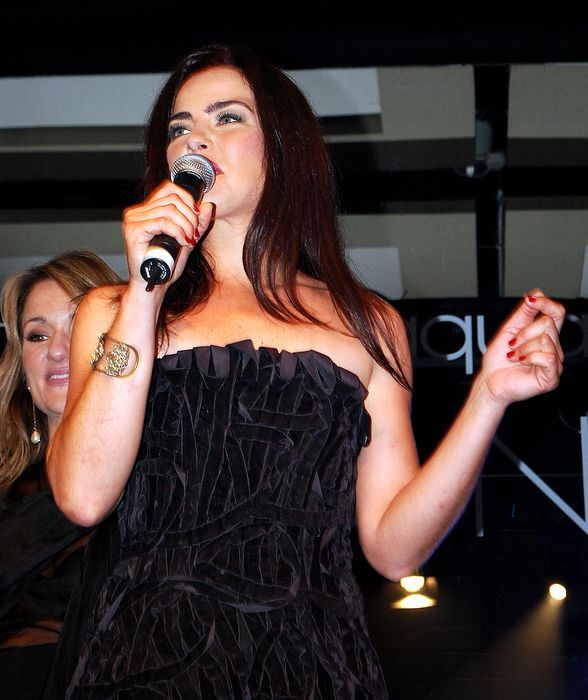
- Arósio in 2009
- Born: 16 July 1975 (age 51); São Paulo, Brazil
- Occupations: Actress; model
- Years active: 1993–2010, 2015, 2022
- Height: 1.70 m (5 ft 7 in)
- Spouse: Henrique Pinheiro (m. 2010)

Ana Paula Arósio (Portuguese pronunciation: [ˈɐ̃nɐ ˈpawlɐ aˈɾɔzju]; born 16 July 1975) is a Brazilian former actress and model based in Swindon, England. She began her modeling career at age 12 and appeared on numerous magazine covers worldwide, becoming one of Brazil’s most visible young models before transitioning to acting as a teenager. She gained national recognition in television dramas and miniseries such as Hilda Furacão (1998) and Terra Nostra (1999), both of which were major hits in Brazil.

== Early life ==
Ana Paula Arósio was born to businesswoman Claudete Aparecida Arósio and industrial mechanic Carlos Arósio, and is of Italian descent, with family roots in the Lombardy region of Italy.

== Career ==
Arósio began her professional career as a child and teen model, quickly becoming one of Brazil’s most recognizable faces in fashion through magazine covers and television advertisements early in her career.

Her transition into acting began in the mid‑1990s, with early television roles including the SBT series Éramos Seis (1994), followed by appearances in Razão de Viver and Os Ossos do Barão, which helped establish her presence as an emerging television actress in Brazil.

Arósio’s breakthrough came in 1998 with the lead role in the miniseries Hilda Furacão, which brought her national recognition and critical acclaim.

In 1999, she starred in the globally successful telenovela Terra Nostra, a period drama about Italian immigration to Brazil that aired in several countries, significantly expanding her international visibility.

Throughout the early 2000s, Arósio took on distinctive roles in productions such as Os Maias (2001) and Esperança (2002).

In 2004, she portrayed socialite Yolanda Penteado in the miniseries Um Só Coração, produced to commemorate São Paulo’s 450th anniversary.

In 2005, she reunited with actor Fábio Assunção in the historical miniseries Mad Maria, depicting the construction of the Madeira‑Mamoré Railway, and appeared in the feature film O Coronel e o Lobisomem, showcasing her range across television and cinema.

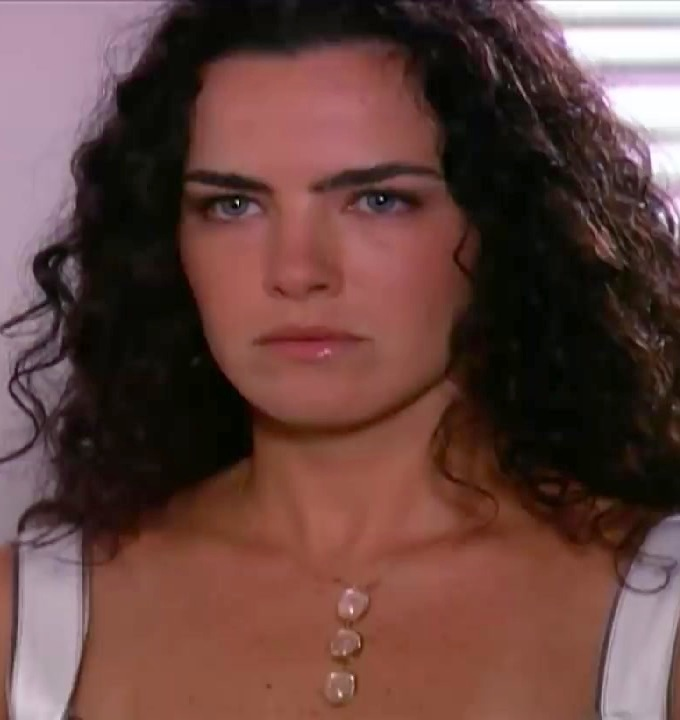
Ana Paula Arósio during a scene from the telenovela Páginas da Vida (2006)

She also expanded into contemporary roles with her performance as Olívia in Páginas da Vida (2006), marking her second modern‑day character after earlier period pieces.

In 2007, Arósio was chosen as the brand ambassador for the global cosmetics company Avon in a major advertising campaign.

In 2008, she returned to a period production by portraying Laura in the telenovela Ciranda de Pedra, an adaptation of the work by Lygia Fagundes Telles.

Arósio’s final major television role was in the series Na Forma da Lei (2010). Later that year her contract with Rede Globo was terminated and she stepped away from regular television roles.

Despite her departure from television, Arósio continued acting in film. She starred in Anita & Garibaldi (2013), a film released after being shot in two production periods; the movie reflects her continued interest in cinema beyond television dramas.

She also appeared in A Floresta Que Se Move (2015), a suspense/drama marking her return to the big screen, and Primavera (2018).

== Legacy ==
Arósio is regarded as one of the most significant Brazilian actresses of her generation, particularly for her work on television in the late 1990s and early 2000s. Her breakthrough roles in productions such as Hilda Furacão and Terra Nostra remain iconic within Brazilian popular culture and television history.

== Personal life ==
In 1996, Arósio' then‑fiancé, businessman Luiz Carlos Leonardo Tjurs, died by suicide following an apparent jealous episode shortly before their planned wedding, an incident that had a severe impact on her life.

Following his death, Arósio had relationships with several public figures before eventually establishing a long-term partnership. In the early 2000s she dated actors and industry professionals including Marcos Palmeira and Tarcísio Filho, among others.

In April 2009, she began a relationship with architect and equestrian Henrique Plombon Pinheiro, whom she married on 16 July 2010 at her ranch in Santa Rita do Passa Quatro, São Paulo. The couple share a passion for horses and rural life, which has shaped their life together outside the entertainment industry.

After leaving television in 2010, Arósio and her husband lived on a farm in the interior of São Paulo before relocating in 2015 to the rural area of Swindon, England, where they continue to raise horses and live a largely private life. Her appearances in media remain rare, though she has occasionally appeared in advertising campaigns since 2020, including for a major Brazilian bank.

Arósio’s relationship with her family has also been the subject of public attention. Reports indicate a strained relationship with her mother, which has endured for many years, and she did not attend her father’s funeral following his death in later life, reinforcing her choice of privacy and distance from public life.

== Filmography ==
=== Film ===
Year	Title	Role
1991	Forever	Berenice
2005	O Coronel e o Lobisomem	Esmeraldina
2005	Celeste & Estrela	Salete
2010	Como Esquecer	Júlia
2013	Anita e Garibaldi	Anita Garibaldi
2015	A Floresta Que Se Move	Clara
2018	Primavera	Rosa

=== Television ===
Year	Title	Role	Network
1994	Éramos Seis	Amanda	SBT
1996	Razão de Viver	Bruna	SBT
1997	Os Ossos do Barão	Isabel	SBT
1998	Hilda Furacão	Hilda	TV Globo
1999	Terra Nostra	Giuliana	TV Globo
2001	Os Maias	Maria Eduarda Maia	TV Globo
2002	Esperança	Camilli	TV Globo
2004	Celebridade	Alice	TV Globo
2004	Um Só Coração	Yolanda Penteado	TV Globo
2005	Mad Maria	Protagonist	TV Globo
2006	Páginas da Vida	Olívia	TV Globo
2008	Ciranda de Pedra	Laura	TV Globo
2010	Na Forma da Lei	Ana Beatriz	TV Globo

=== Theatre ===
Year	Title	Role	Notes
1995	Batom	—	Theatre
1997	Fedra	—	Theatre
1999	Harmonia em Negro	—	Theatre
2000	Diário Secreto de Adão e Eva	—	Theatre
2002	Casa de Bonecas	Nora Helmer	Also producer

== Awards and nominations ==
Year	Award	Category	Work	Result
1998	Troféu Imprensa	Revelation of the Year	Hilda Furacão	Won
1999	Troféu Imprensa	Best Actress	Terra Nostra	Won
2002	Troféu Imprensa	Best Actress	Esperança	Won
2004	3rd Film Festival of Varginha	Best Supporting Actress	Celeste & Estrela	Won
2005	Prêmio Contigo	Best Supporting Actress	O Coronel e o Lobisomem	Won
