= Débora Duarte =

Brazilian actress (born 1950)

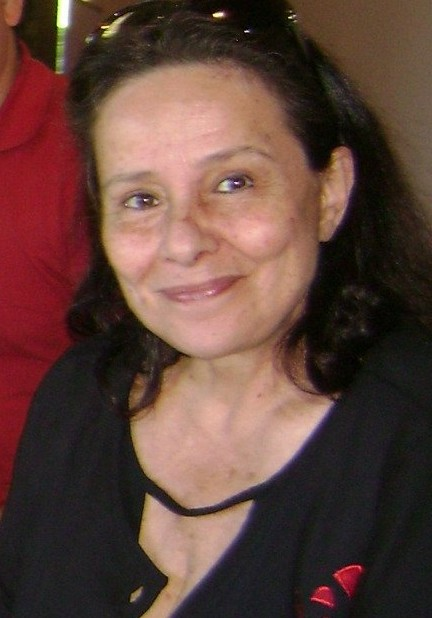
- Born: Débora Susan Duke; 2 January 1950 (age 76); São Paulo, Brazil
- Occupation: Actress
- Years active: 1964–present
- Spouse(s): Wladimir Nikolaief (divorced); Antônio Marcos (divorced)
- Children: Daniela Duarte (eldest daughter); Paloma Duarte (youngest daughter)

Débora Susan Sanches Duke (born January 2, 1950) best known as Débora Duarte, is a Brazilian actress.

== Early life ==
Débora was born in São Paulo, Brazil. She is the daughter of actress Marisa Sanches with the American musician, Douglas Duke. When she was a year and eight months, her mother married the Brazilian actor Lima Duarte, who became her father. In order to honor him, Débora Duke adopted his stage name "Duarte".

At the age of five, Duarte got her first role, on the TV Tupi series Ciranda, cirandinha.

Her biography, Débora Duarte: Filha da Televisão (Coleção Aplauso Perfil) by writer Laura Malin, was published in 2009.

== Personal life ==
She has been married twice, first to actor Wladimir Nikolaief, and, secondly to singer Antônio Marcos (died 6 April 1992). She has two daughters, Daniela and Paloma Duarte, both also actresses.

== Filmography ==
=== Television ===
- 2024 - A Caverna Encantada .... Dona Clélia
- 2012 - Lado a Lado .... Eulália Praxedes
- 2011 - Cordel Encantado .... Dona Amália
- 2010 - Tempos Modernos .... Tertuliana
- 2009 - Toma Lá, Dá Cá ....... Moacira
- 2008 - Três Irmãs .... Florinda
- 2007 - Paraíso Tropical .... Hermínia
- 2004 - Como uma Onda .... Alice Prata
- 2003 - Canavial de Paixões .... Teresa Giácomo (SBT)
- 2002 - O Quinto dos Infernos .... Amália (miniseries)
- 2001 - Porto dos Milagres .... Olímpia
- 1999 - Terra Nostra .... Maria do Socorro
- 1998 - Hilda Furacão .... Tia Sãozinha (miniseries)
- 1995 - Explode Coração .... Marisa
- 1994 - Pátria Minha .... Carmita Bevilácqua
- 1993 - Sonho Meu .... Mariana
- 1991 - Grande pai .... Maria
- 1989 - Cortina de vidro .... Giovana (SBT)
- 1988 - Bebê a Bordo .... Joana Mendonça
- 1987 - A rainha da vida .... Estela (minissérie - Rede Manchete)
- 1984 - Corpo a Corpo .... Eloá Pelegrini
- 1984 - Partido Alto .... Laura
- 1984 - Padre Cícero .... Maria de Araújo (minissérie)
- 1984 - Anarquistas graças a Deus .... Angelina Gattai (miniseries)
- 1983 - Parabéns pra você .... Maria Rita (minissérie)
- 1982 - Elas por Elas .... Rosa
- 1981 - Jogo da vida .... Beatriz Madureira
- 1980 - Coração Alado .... Catucha
- 1979 - Cara a cara .... Regina
- 1977 - O profeta .... Carola
- 1975 - Pecado Capital .... Vilminha Lisboa
- 1975 - Escalada
- 1974 - O espigão .... Dora
- 1973 - Carinhoso .... Marisa
- 1972 - A Patota .... Nely
- 1971 - Bicho do Mato .... Ruth
- 1971 - Editora Mayo, bom dia .... Jô
- 1970 - Toninho on the Rocks .... Anita
- 1970 - As bruxas .... Stella
- 1969 - Beto Rockfeller .... Lu
- 1968 - O homem que sonhava colorido
- 1968 - O décimo mandamento .... Mariana
- 1967 - O grande segredo .... Nina
- 1967 - O morro dos ventos uivantes .... young Catarina
- 1966 - Ninguém crê em mim .... Martinha
- 1965 - Ana Maria, meu amor
- 1965 - O pecado de cada um .... Mônica
- 1965 - A outra .... Carina
- 1964 - Gutierritos, o drama dos humildes
- 1964 - Quem casa com Maria? .... Maria das Graças
- 1958 - Os miseráveis .... Cosette

=== Film ===
- 1987 - A menina do lado
- 1974 - Pontal da solidão
- 1970 - Céleste
- 1970 - Pais quadrados... filhos avançados
