= Duda Santos (actress) =

Brazilian actress and model

- Born: Maria Eduarda Santos Domingues; May 25, 2001 (age 25); Rio de Janeiro, Rio de Janeiro, Brazil
- Other name: Duda Santos
- Occupations: Actress; Model
- Years active: 2019–present
- Notable work: Maria Santa in Renascer (2024); Beatriz in Garota do Momento
- Height: 1.63 m (5 ft 4 in)

Maria Eduarda Santos Domingues, better known as Duda Santos (May 25, 2001) is a Brazilian actress and model. She became known for playing Maria Santa in Renascer and Beatriz in Garota do Momento.

== Biography ==
=== Early years ===
The eldest in a family of four siblings, Duda Santos was born in Rio de Janeiro, and lived in the Ipase community, in the Vila Cosmos neighborhood, in the city's North Zone, until she moved to Jacarepaguá to be closer to work. At the age of 18, she told her family that she wanted to pursue a career in acting and soon began studying to become an actress.

=== Career ===
She made her debut in 2019, where she landed a role in TV Globo's teen series Malhação, where she played the student Paula in the twenty-seventh season, entitled Toda Formar de Amor. In 2022, the actress gained recognition when she played the teenager Isa in Glória Perez's nine-part soap opera Travessia, the daughter of the couple played by Aílton Graça and Indira Nascimento, making her debut in a permanent soap opera cast.

In the same year, her first movie project was released, Pronto, Falei, a romantic comedy in which she took part in a love triangle with Nicolas Prattes and Rômulo Arantes Neto. In the following year she played a samba school stylist in the movie An Unforgettable Year – Summer. Based on the book Amor de Carnaval, by Thalita Rebouças, and shot by director Cris D'Amato in 2021, the actress played Arlete's daughter (played by Késia Estácio), who helps her mother make carnival costumes but dreams of becoming a drummer.

In January 2024, she achieved national fame. Starring in the first phase of Renascer, a remake of the soap opera of the same name shown in 1993 by TV Globo (where, at the time, the heroine was played by actress Patrícia França), her character, the innocent Maria Santa, ends up falling in love with the character José Inocêncio (played by Humberto Carrão). The character won the affection of viewers and Duda stood out for scenes that garnered praise alongside Carrão and actors Belize Pombal, Fábio Lago and Juliana Paes. In the second phase of the plot, the actress returned in sporadic appearances, representing the spirit of the character. At the same time as working on the second phase of the soap opera, she filmed the movie Funk, by Aly Muritiba, in which she plays the protagonist Sabrina.

In the same year, she was announced as Beatriz, the main character in the 6pm soap opera Garota do Momento. In the plot, which deals with the world of advertising in the 1950s, Beatriz, born and raised in Petrópolis, travels to Rio de Janeiro in search of her mother, Clarice (Carol Castro), who left her when she was a child in order to provide better living conditions for both of them in the capital, and discovers that she has raised another daughter, Bia (Maisa Silva) in her place.

In 2025, she was announced as the lead in the film Solina, by Larissa Fernandes, and could be seen in Guerreiros do Sol, a Globoplay original soap opera recorded in 2023 where she played Guiomar, a young woman who is interned in a concentration camp and who consequently has to deal with abuse from Arduíno (Irandhir Santos).

== Personal life ==
The daughter of a single mother, she was raised mainly by her mother, Raphaela, who had her when she was 17, and by her former stepfather, Tiago, the father of her three siblings, and an aunt, Vera. In an interview with the comedy show Que História É Essa, Porchat?, she reported that she had discovered that she was the half-sister of child actor João Pedro Martins, from the series Pablo e Luisão, the son of her biological father.

She is a candomblecist, having been introduced to the religion by her mother.

== Filmography ==
=== TV ===
| Year | Title | Character | Note(s) | Ref. |
|---|---|---|---|---|
| 2019–2020 | Malhação: Toda Formar de Amor | Paula | | |
| 2022–2023 | The Path | Isabel Monteiro (Isa) | | |
| 2024 | Rebirth | Maria Santa da Conceição Inocêncio (Santinha) | Episodes: “January 22—February 5” | |
| 2024–2025 | She's The One | Beatriz Toledo Dourado (Bia) | | |
| 2025 | Love Is A Knife | Guiomar | | |
| 2025 | Dança dos Famosos | Contestant | Season 22 | |
| 2026 | A Nobreza do Amor | Alika Cayman, Princess of Batanga / Lúcia dos Santos | | |

=== Cinema ===
| Year | Title | Character | Note(s) | Ref. |
|---|---|---|---|---|
| 2020 | Pronto, Falei | Daniella | | |
| 2023 | An Unforgettable Year – Summer | Tatiana (Tati) | | |
| TBA | Funk | Sabrina | | |
| TBA | Solina | Flor | | |

== Awards and nominations ==
| Year | Prize | Category | Work | Result | Ref. |
|---|---|---|---|---|---|
| 2024 | F5 Prize | Best Newcomer | Renascer/ Garota do Momento | Won | |
