= Goianá =

- Municipality
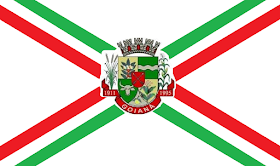
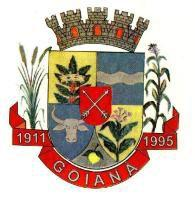
- Flag Coat of arms

- Location in Brazil
- Coordinates: 21°32′13″S 43°12′7″W
- Country: Brazil
- Region: Southeast
- State: Minas Gerais
- Mesoregion: Zona da Mata

Population (2020)
  - Total: 3,990
- Time zone: UTC−3 (BRT)

Goianá is a municipality in the state of Minas Gerais in the Southeast region of Brazil. It achieved municipality status in 1995 when it was separated from Rio Novo.

The municipality, along with Rio Novo, is the site of Itamar Franco Regional Airport, which serves the Zona da Mata region.

== See also ==
- List of municipalities in Minas Gerais
