= Zona da Mata Regional Airport =

Presidente Itamar Franco Airport Aeroporto Presidente Itamar Franco
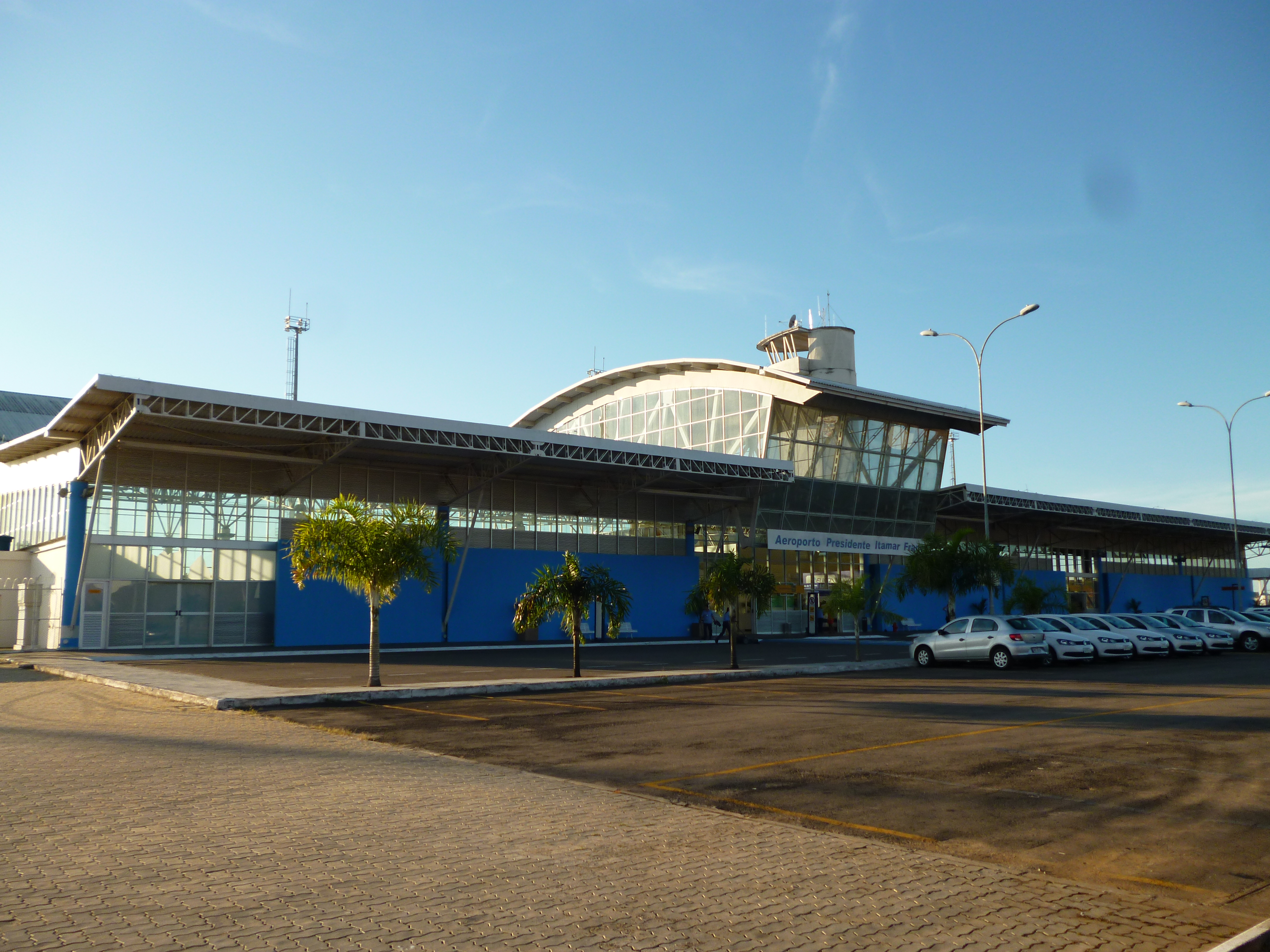
- IATA: IZA; ICAO: SBZM; LID: MG0006; GPS: -21.485265, -43.167383

Summary
- Airport type: Public
- Operator: Infraero (2007–2011); Multiterminais (2011–2015); Socicam (2015–present)
- Serves: Juiz de Fora
- Location: Goianá, Brazil
- Time zone: BRT (UTC−03:00)
- Elevation AMSL: 412 m (1,352 ft)
- Coordinates: 21°30′47″S 043°10′23″W
- Website: www.cazm.com.br

Map
- Location in Brazil IZA (Brazil)

Runways
Direction	Length		Surface
Direction	m	ft	Surface
08/26	2,525	8,284	Asphalt
- Sources: Website, ANAC, DECEA

Presidente Itamar Franco Airport (IATA: IZA, ICAO: SBZM), formerly and still commonly called Zona da Mata Regional Airport, is an airport serving Juiz de Fora, and the region of Zona da Mata, Brazil, located in the municipality of Goianá. Since March 8, 2012 the airport is named after Itamar Augusto Cautiero Franco, the 33rd President of Brazil.

It is operated by Socicam.

== History ==
The construction of the airport was completed in 2007 but commercial operations began only on August 23, 2011.

In March 2011 Infraero ceased to administrate the airport and Multiterminais Alfandegados do Brasil became the new administrator.

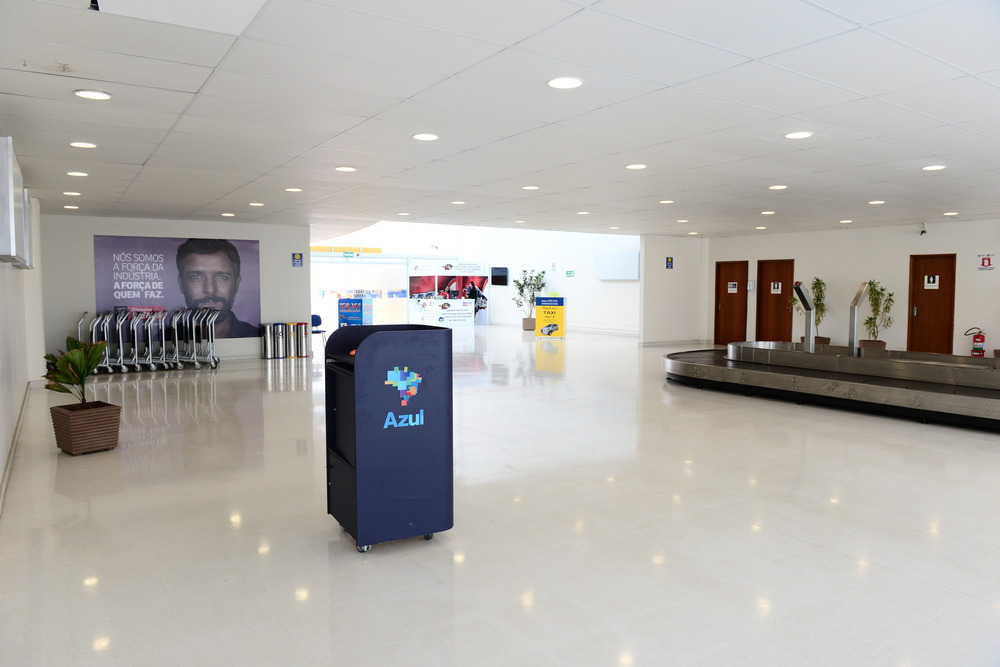
Juiz de Fora Airport

In January 2015, through a public bidding launched by the Government of Minas Gerais, the Presidente Itamar Franco Airport started to be administered by the Concessionária do Aeroporto da Zona da Mata S.A., formed by Socicam Administração, Projetos e Representações Ltda. and Companhia Brasileira de Comércio Exterior (CBCE). Socicam is a company with experience in the administration of bus terminals (such as Tietê Bus Terminal in São Paulo/SP), airport terminals (such as the Airport of Caldas Novas-GO), as well as urban and container terminals.

== Airlines and destinations ==
Airlines	Destinations
Azul Brazilian Airlines	Campinas
Gol Linhas Aéreas	São Paulo–Congonhas
LATAM Brasil	São Paulo–Guarulhos

== Access ==
The airport is located 35 km (22 mi) from downtown Juiz de Fora, 64 km (40 mi) from downtown Ubá, and 75 km (47 mi) from downtown Cataguases.

There are currently two bus independent companies that provide shuttle service to the Airport, departing from the city of Juiz de Fora: Viação José Maria Rodrigues and Viação Bassamar. The Airport also has an independent taxi company, named Companhia de Táxi Aeroporto Zona da Mata.

== See also ==
- List of airports in Brazil
