= Pages of Life =

Pages of Life may refer to:

- Pages of Life (album), a 1990 album by the Desert Rose Band
- Pages of Life (film), a 1922 silent British drama film
- Páginas da Vida (Brazilian TV series) (Pages of Life), a 2006-2007 Brazilian telenovela
- Páginas da Vida (Portuguese TV series), a 2026 Portuguese telenovela

== See also ==
- Pages of Life - Chapters I & II, a 1998 album by Fred Hammond
