= Fernanda Young =

Brazilian actress (1970–2019)

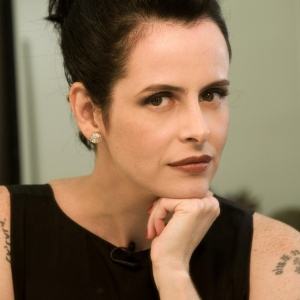
- Young in 2009
- Born: Fernanda Maria Leite Young; 1 May 1970; Niterói, Rio de Janeiro, Brazil
- Died: 25 August 2019 (aged 49); Paraisópolis, Minas Gerais, Brazil
- Resting place: Congonhas Cemetery, São Paulo, Brazil
- Occupations: Writer; screenwriter; television presenter; model; actress
- Years active: 1989−2019
- Known for: Os Normais; Separação?!; Macho Man; Como Aproveitar o Fim do Mundo
- Spouse: Alexandre Machado (m. 1993)
- Children: 4
- Website: www.fernandayoung.com.br

Fernanda Maria Young de Carvalho Machado (née Leite Young; 1 May 1970 – 25 August 2019), commonly known as Fernanda Young, was a Brazilian writer, screenwriter, television presenter, model and actress.

== Education ==
Young's literary background was partly formed while crossing the Guanabara Bay by ferry or by bus. She interrupted her studies after graduating from elementary school, and then graduated from high school through a six-month substitute. She attended the Faculty of Arts of the Fluminense Federal University, without graduating. She would still study journalism at Faculdades Integradas Hélio Alonso and, after moving to São Paulo and beginning her writing career, she would become a Radio and Television student at Fundação Armando Alvares Penteado (FAAP), but would not finish any of the courses. Young later stated that she'd sworn never to step on a university campus after the experiments, but later attended Fine Arts at FAAP.

== Career ==
In 2013, she wrote and acted as one of the protagonists of the series Surtadas na Yoga ("Yoga Freaks"), with thirteen episodes in the first season. The series tells the story of three women, Jessica (Young), Ana Maria (Flávia Garrafa) and Marion (Anna Sophia Folch) who do yoga to "deal with the madness of the world, and their own madness". Due to its success and 115% growth in the GNT audience, in April 2014 a second season was launched with thirteen more episodes. In October 2014, after three seasons, the series was canceled.

Young posed nude for the Brazilian edition of Playboy magazine, launched in November 2009.

In May 2015, she released her eleventh book and the second poetry book of her career, entitled A Mão Esquerda de Vênus ("The Left Hand of Venus"), by Editora Globo. The launch took place at the Vermelho Gallery in São Paulo.

It was announced that she would be in the new version of TV Mulher, a television program aimed at a female audience, with a premiere scheduled for 31 May 2016 on the Viva channel.

At the time of her death, Young was scheduled to debut a new play, Ainda Nada de Novo ("Still Nothing New"), on 12 September at the Cultural Center of São Paulo. The play, about two homosexual actresses, would have starred Young and Fernanda Nobre.

== Personal life and death ==
Young was married to screenwriter and writer Alexandre Machado since 1993 and had four children: twins Cecilia Maddona and Estela May (born 2000); and two adopted children, Catarina Lakshimi (born 2008), and John Gopala (born 2009).

Young died on 25 August 2019, at the age of 49, due to an intense and sudden asthma attack. Young, who had been treated for asthma since childhood, was visiting her family's place in Gonçalves, Minas Gerais. After the attack started, she passed out in her bedroom. An ambulance was called, and she was taken to the nearest hospital, located in the city of Paraisópolis. She died of respiratory and cardiac arrest just over an hour after being admitted into ICU. Young was buried in Congonhas Cemetery, in the southern zone of São Paulo, the city where she had lived for fifteen years.

Her life and career are depicted in the 2024 documentary film Fernanda Young - Foge-me ao Controle.
