= Paloma Duarte =

Brazilian actress

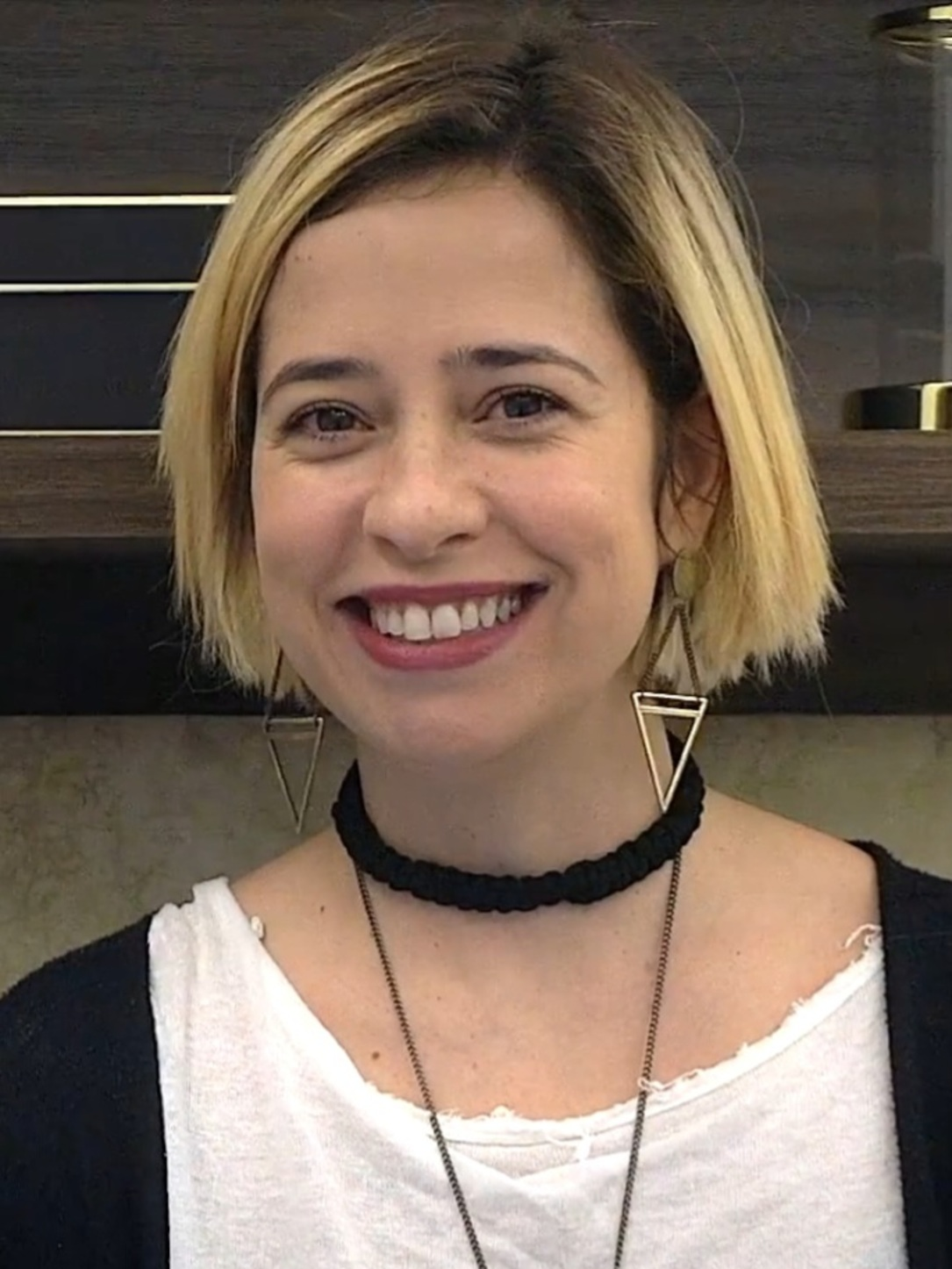
- Duarte in 2018
- Born: Paloma Marcos Sanches Silva; May 21, 1977 (age 48); São Paulo, Brazil
- Occupation: actress
- Years active: 1986–present
- Parent(s): Débora Duarte (mother); Antônio Marcos (father)
- Relatives: Marisa Sanches (grandmother); Lima Duarte (grandfather); Daniela Duarte (half-sister); Aretha Marcos (half-sister)

Paloma Marcos Sanches Silva (born 21 May 1977) is a Brazilian actress, best known as Paloma Duarte for Two Sons of Francisco (2005), Leo e Bia (2010) and Soulbound (2011).
