= Danton Mello =

Brazilian actor

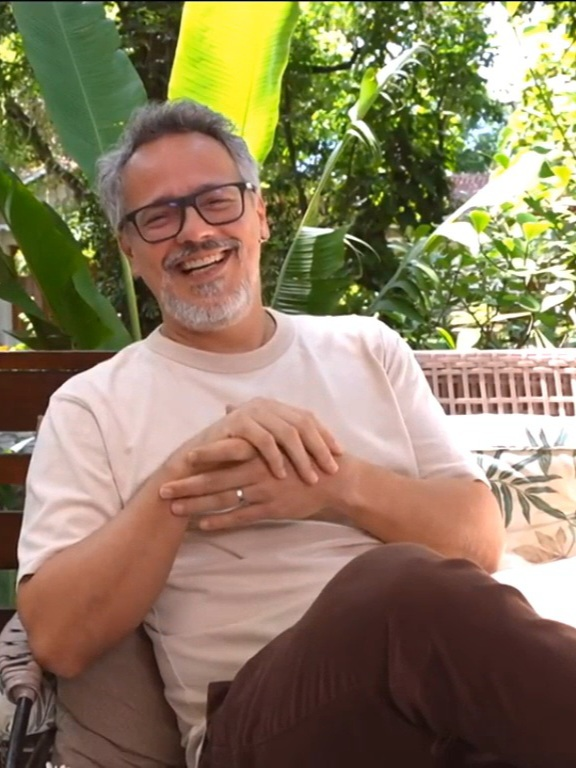
- Danton Mello in 2024
- Born: Danton Figueiredo Melo; 27 May 1975 (age 51); Passos, Minas Gerais, Brazil
- Occupations: Actor, voice actor, comedian
- Spouse(s): Laura Malin (m. 1993–2005) Sheila Ramos (m. 2017)
- Children: 2
- Relatives: Selton Mello (brother)

Danton Figueiredo Mello (born 29 May 1975) is a Brazilian actor, voice actor and comedian. Known for his roles in TV Globo soap operas, such as Neco (Cabocla), Rodolfo (Sinhá Moça) and Roberto (Hilda Furacão). His work in comedy is marked by his performance in films, series and works of the genre. Among others, he voiced actor Leonardo DiCaprio in four feature films, including Titanic and The Beach in Brazil. He is the brother of fellow actor Selton Mello.

== Personal life ==
=== Childhood and adolescence ===
Son of retired bank employee Dalton Natal Melo and Selva Aretusa Figueiredo Melo, a housewife. Danton grew up alongside his older brother, Selton Mello, who had also become a renowned actor and director. From an early age, the brothers shared a very close relationship and an affinity with the arts, influenced by a family environment that encouraged creativity.

During his childhood, accompanying his brother on recordings, Danton showed an interest in acting, which led him to move to São Paulo and later to Rio de Janeiro as a child, where the family sought new opportunities, as his older brother had consolidated his option for art. In 1995, he began his artistic career when he was just ten years old, in the soap opera A Gata Comeu, in addition to some acting and advertising work. The actor says that starting his career early didn't deprive him of anything: "I was able to divide my time with school, it was a requirement. We only recorded after school hours, my parents helped me. I loved recording. I saw it as a game of telling a story, of putting on different clothes and playing a character".

As a teenager, while he continued to build his career as an actor, Danton began dating Laura Malin, who would later become a writer and his first wife. The actor, in his youth, took the history entrance exam but ended up missing the last test because of the recordings.

=== Helicopter crash ===
On September 14, 1998, while flying over Mount Roraima recording a report for Globo Ecologia, a television program about environmental education shown by TV Globo, the helicopter he was in suffered a breakdown and crashed. The actor and his team were found 30 hours after the accident by indigenous people from the Raposa Serra do Sol Indigenous Land, who notified FUNAI so that the rescue could be carried out. Danton had severe internal bleeding and was rushed into surgery, at risk to his life, recovering weeks later. His character in Torre de Babel ended up being removed, but with the actor's recovery, in November of that year, he returned to recording, due to its popularity, in a wheelchair and also with the aid of a crutch.

=== Relationships ===
He married Laura in 1993, when he was just 18 years old. Together, they had two daughters: Luísa, born in 2001, and Alice, in 2003. The marriage lasted 12 years and ended in 2005. Even after the separation, Danton maintained a cordial relationship with Laura and continued to be a present father in his daughters' lives.

In 2013, Danton began a relationship with Sheila Ramos, a businesswoman whom he married in 2017. The wedding ceremony was marked by simplicity and closeness with friends and family. In 2014, his two daughters moved with his ex-wife to the United States. The actor said he suffered a lot after leaving but ended up accepting it with the help of therapy and his mother, Selva.

=== Spirituality ===
In 2022, Danton Mello's relationship with his spirituality was given new meaning after starring in the film Predestinado - Arigó and the Spirit of Dr. Fritz, a spiritualist film that tells the story of the medium José Arigó and his spiritual surgeries through the incorporation of the spirit of Dr. Fritz. Until then, he considered himself an atheist, but the film made him think a lot about the subject.

=== Diabetes ===
The actor has type 2 diabetes and treats the disease with medical supervision. Danton says that his entire family is diabetic and his condition is strictly genetic: "My glucose level was always at the limit. My mother is diabetic, my grandfather, her father, also had diabetes. I had a genetic issue too. Until one One day, during a routine exam, my glucose was very high. From then on I started taking medication"

== Career ==
=== First works ===
His debut in soap operas took place in 1985, at the age of ten, as Cuca in A Gata Comeu. In 1988, he played the character Bruno Meireles, son of Leila (Cássia Kis) and Ivan (Antônio Fagundes) in the soap opera Vale Tudo; The following year, he played Peto, son of the antagonist Perpétua (Joana Fomm) in the soap opera Tieta. In 1994, he participated in the soap opera A Viagem, playing Johnny, a young rebel who becomes friends with Tato (Felipe Martins).

=== Malhação ===
In 1995, he played Héricles, protagonist of the first season of the series Malhação. In the plot, his character was a country boy who moved to the big city to study history and was dating a Greek girl named Cassandra from a distance, through letters; Throughout the plot, Héricles becomes involved in a romantic conflict between the characters of Isabela (Juliana Martins) and Rafaela (Flávia Bonato). The following year, he continued with the same role in the second season of Malhação dating Alex (Camila Pitanga), who later reveals herself to be Cassandra's cousin; He only returned to the series later with another character, in 2011, in Malhação Conectados to play the role of Fabiano, Isabela's (Bella Camero) father and Laura's (Letícia Spiller) romantic partner.

=== Highlights ===
In 1996, he transferred to SBT, where he acted in Dona Anja. He returned to Globo in 1997 to play the narrator of the miniseries Hilda Furacão, in the plot, his character Roberto Drummond is a reporter and communist militant who decides to tell the story of his life and his friends, Malthus (Rodrigo Santoro), Aramel (Thiago Lacerda) and Hilda Furacão (Ana Paula Arósio). Between 1997 and 1999 he was also the presenter of Globo Ecologia, where he suffered a helicopter accident. In 1998 (simultaneously with the previous one), he was in the soap opera Torre de Babel as Adriano, Shirlei's (Karina Barum) romantic partner. The following year, he participated in the last chapters of Terra Nostra. After three years dedicating himself to theater, he returned in 2003 as the protagonist of Jamais Te Esquecerei, on SBT. Back on Globo, in 2004, he co-starred in the second version of the soap opera Cabocla, playing Neco, a young man with advanced ideals for the time who becomes a political leader of great prestige. In 2006, he played the protagonist Rodolfo in the soap opera Sinhá Moça; the character is a young abolitionist, republican and law graduate, whose dedication to his ideals is shared with the protagonist Sinhá Moça (Débora Falabella). Throughout the plot, the two develop a romance and form a couple. In 2009, he played Amitav from Caminho das Indias, his character was the husband of Surya (Cleo Pires), eldest son of Opash (Tony Ramos) and Indira (Eliane Giardini) and is extremely attached to Indian traditions. In 2012, he was the protagonist of the romcom series: Como Aproveitar o Fim do Mundo, playing the character Ernani, an accounting technician, who is convinced by his co-worker Kátia (Alline Moraes) that, according to the Maya calendar, the world would end on 21 December 2012. With this perspective, both embark on various adventures to make the most of the days they have remain. Throughout the plot, end up falling in love. In 2013, he starred in the comedy Vai que Dá Certo, a huge box office success.

Between 2014 and 2019, he worked on the comedy program Tá no Ar: a TV na TV, where he played several characters per chapter, alongside Marcelo Adnet and Marcius Melhem. In 2015 (simultaneously with the previous one), he acted in the soap opera I Love Paraisópolis, playing the character Cícero. In 2019, he played delegate Almeidinha in Órfãos da Terra. Since November 2024, he has played the role of Raimundo Sobral in Garota do Momento, a conservative father and owner of an advertising company.

=== With his brother ===
Brothers Selton and Danton Mello have shared the screen several times. In their childhood, they acted together in commercials, and Danton, who often accompanied Selton on recordings, appeared in Corpo a Corpo in 1984. In 1988, they starred in Chico Anysio's special: Grupo Escoulacho. Later, they also shared the stage in theater plays. In the film The Clown, directed by and starring Selton, Danton made a special appearance as Aldo, owner of the Aldo Auto Peças establishment. Years later, in 2021, they returned to act together in the 5th season of Sessão de Terapia in episode 34, where they played brothers in a dramatic scene.

== Filmography ==
=== Television ===
Year	Title	Character	Notes
1984	Corpo a Corpo		Figuration
1985	A Gata Comeu	Carlos Eduardo Coutinho (Cuca)	
1986	Novo Amor	Adriano	
1987	Mandala	Gerson	Episodes: October 12 – 19
1988	Vale Tudo	Bruno Meirelles	
1988	Grupo Escolacho	Luís	
1989	Tieta	Cupertino Esteves Batista Filho (Peto)	
1992	Despedida de Solteiro	Rafael (Rafa)	
1993	Guerra sem Fim	Lucas Monteseu (Castigo-de-mãe)	
1993	Família Brasil	Diogo Moraes (Grilo)	
1994	Você Decide	Rogério	Season 3 - Episode 16
1994	A Viagem	Johnny	
1994	Confissões de Adolescente	Guilherme	Episode: "A Melhor Amiga"
1995	Malhação	Héricles Barreto	Season 1
1996	Malhação	Héricles Barreto	Season 2
1996	Malhação de Verão	Héricles Barreto	Spinoff: Season 2
1996	Dona Anja	Bruno Macedo (Bruno Caçapa)	
1997	Caça Talentos	Juca	Season 3 - Episode: "Lambidão"
1997 - 1999	Globo Ecologia	Apresentador	
1998	Hilda Furacão	Roberto Drummond	
1998	Você Decide	Dony	Season 7 - Episode 5
1998	Torre de Babel	Adriano de Almeida Paes (Chicletinho)	
1999	Terra Nostra	Bruno Ribeiro	
1999	Você Decide	Davi	Season 8 - Episode 32
2000	Você Decide	Kevin	Season 9 - Episode 22
2003	Jamais Te Esquecerei	Eduardo Moraima	
2004	Cabocla	Manuel Junqueira Caldas (Neco)	
2004	Correndo Atrás	Rodrigo Dourado	Film of The Year special
2005	Sob Nova Direção	Ricardo	Season 2 - Episode 20
2006	Sinhá Moça	Rodolfo Garcia Fontes	
2008	Casos e Acasos	Adriano	Episode: "Piloto"
2008	Casos e Acasos	Wagner	Episode: "O Trote"
2008	Casos e Acasos	Ulisses	Episode: "O Desejo Escondido"
2008	Casos e Acasos	Gustavo	Episode: "O Encontro"
2008	Faça Sua História	Johnny Valente	Episode: "Oswaldir Superstar"
2009	Caminho das Índias	Amithab Ananda	
2010	Tempos Modernos	Renato Vieira	
2010	S.O.S. Emergência	Marcelo	Episode: "Cuidado, Sexo Frágil"
2011	Malhação Conectados	Fabiano Duarte	Season 19
2012	Dercy de Verdade	Carlos Manga	
2012	As Brasileiras	Diogo	Episode: "A Selvagem de Santarém"
2012	As Brasileiras	Gustavo	Episode: "A Reacionária do Pantanal"
2012	Como Aproveitar o Fim do Mundo	Ernani da Silva	
2013	A Grande Família	Juvenal Oliveira (Caveira)	Season 13
2014-2019	Tá no Ar: a TV na TV	Vários Personagens	
2015	I Love Paraisópolis	Cícero Diniz	
2017	Pega Pega	Rodrigo Borges (Borges)	
2018	Deus Salve o Rei	Gregório	Episodes: May 19 – July 30
2018	Dança dos Famosos	Participante	Season 15
2019	Órfãos da Terra	Delegado Antônio Carlos Almeida (Almeidinha)	
2021	Sessão de Terapia	Miguel Barone	Season 5 - Episode 34
2021	Um Lugar ao Sol	Matheus Nogueira Sales	
2024	Justiça 2	Abílio Fayete	
2024	Garota do Momento	Raimundo Sobral	

=== Cinema ===
Year	Title	Character
2003	Benjamim	Benjamin Zambraia (young)
2003	O Preço da Paz	Daniel
2004	Tudo Isto é Fado	Leonardo
2004	Araguaya - A Conspiração do Silêncio	Carlos
2005	Quanto Vale Ou É Por Quilo?	Hector
2009	Ouro Negro - A Saga do Petróleo Brasileiro	João Martins
2011	The Clown	Aldo
2013	Vai que Dá Certo	Rodrigo
2013	O Concurso	Caio Madureira
2015	Superpai	Diogo
2015	A Esperança é a Última que Morre	Eric
2016	Vai que Dá Certo 2	Rodrigo
2016	Intruso	Pedro
2017	Os Penetras 2 – Quem Dá Mais?	Santiago
2018	Antes que Eu me Esqueça	Paulo Domingues
2019	Hebe: A Estrela do Brasil	Cláudio Pressutti
2021	Um Tio Quase Perfeito 2	Beto
2022	Predestinado: Arigó e o Espírito do Dr. Fritz	José Pedro de Freitas (Zé Arigó)
2023	Apaixonada	Alfredo
2023	Chef Jack: The Adventurous Cook	Chef Jack
2023	Ninguém É de Ninguém	Roberto
2024	Biônicos	Paulo Guerra

== Voice acting ==
=== Cinema ===
Year	Title	Character (Actor)
1981	Chariots of Fire	Artist 1 (Kenneth Branagh)
1982	Death Valley	Billy (Peter Billingsley)
1984	Gremlins	Pete Fountaine (Corey Feldman)
1985	Goonies	Bocão (Corey Feldman)
1985	The Black Cauldron	Duende Verde
1987	Revenge of the Nerds II: Nerds in Paradise	Lamar Latrelle (Larry B. Scott)
1987	The Principal	Raymi Rojas (Esai Morales)
1989	The Fly II	Martin (Eric Stoltz)
1990	Exile	Schenke (Corey Feldman)
1991	New Jack City	Nick Peretti (Judd Nelson)
1993	What's Eating Gilbert Grape	Arnie Grape (Leonardo DiCaprio)
1997	Titanic	Jack Dawson (Leonardo DiCaprio)
1998	Celebrity	Brandon Darrow (Leonardo DiCaprio)
1999	American Pie	Jim Levenstein (Jason Biggs)
2000	The Beach	Richard (Leonardo DiCaprio)
2016	Robinson Crusoe	Robinson Crusoé
2016	The Secret Life of Pets	Max
2019	The Secret Life of Pets 2	Max
2023	Chef Jack	Chef Jack
2024	Dalia e o Livro Vermelho	Adolfo e Bode
2025	Zootopia 2	Gary De'Snake

=== Television ===
Character (Actor)	Title
Brian Tenner (Benji Gregory)	ALF
Daniel Zapata (Abraham Pons)	Carrossel

== Awards and nominations ==
Year	Ceremony	Category	Nominations	Results
2004	Prêmio Qualidade Brasil	Best Supporting Actor on Television	Cabocla	Won
2005	Prêmio Contigo! de TV	Best Romantic Couple (with Regiane Alves)	Cabocla	Nominated
2013	Prêmio Contigo! de TV	Best Actor in a Series or Miniseries	Como Aproveitar o Fim do Mundo	Nominated
2013	Prêmio Quem de Cinema	Best Film Actor	Vai que Dá Certo	Nominated
2022	Festival Sesc Melhores Filmes	Best National Actor	Um Tio Quase Perfeito 2	Nominated
2022	Grande Prêmio do Cinema Brasileiro	Best Supporting Actor	Um Tio Quase Perfeito 2	Nominated
2023	Festival Sesc Melhores Filmes	Best National Actor	Predestinado	Nominated
2024	Festival Sesc Melhores Filmes	Best National Actor	Ninguém é de Ninguém	Nominated
