= List of Brazilian actors =

This is a list of Brazilian actors.

== Actors ==
=== A ===
- Adoniran Barbosa
- Adriano Garib
- Agildo Ribeiro
- Aílton Graça
- Alberto Guzik
- Alberto Perez
- Alberto Ruschel
- Alejandro Claveaux
- Alexandre Barillari
- Alexandre Borges
- Alexandre Frota
- Alexandre Lippiani
- Alexandre Machado
- Alexandre Nero
- Alexandre Rodrigues
- Amir Haddad
- André Di Mauro
- André Bankoff
- André Frambach
- André Gonçalves
- André Lamoglia
- André Marques
- André Mattos
- André Moraes
- André Segatti
- Ângelo Antônio
- Anselmo Duarte
- Antônio Abujamra
- Antônio Calloni
- Antônio Carlos Pires
- Antônio Fagundes
- Antonio Grassi
- Antônio Monteiro
- Antônio Pitanga
- Antônio Pompêo
- Anthony Steffen
- Arlindo Lopes
- Ary Fontoura
- Ary Toledo
- Átila Iório

=== B ===
- Babu Santana
- Bemvindo Sequeira
- Breno Mello
- Bruna Hamú
- Bruno Cabrerizo
- Bruno Dubeux
- Bruno Fagundes
- Bruno Gagliasso
- Bruno Garcia
- Bruno Gissoni
- Zózimo Bulbul
- Bussunda

=== C ===
- Caco Ciocler
- Caio Blat
- Caio Castro
- Caio Horowicz
- Caio Paduan
- Canarinho
- Carlo Porto
- Carlos Alberto Riccelli
- Carlos Casagrande
- Carlos Imperial
- Carlos Kroeber
- Carlos Kurt
- Carlos Vereza
- Carmo Dalla Vecchia
- Cássio Gabus Mendes
- Cauã Reymond
- Cecil Thiré
- Celso Frateschi
- Charles Paraventi
- Chico Anísio
- Chico Diaz
- Christiana Guinle
- Claudio Heinrich
- Clayton Silva
- Cristina Lark

=== D ===
- Dado Dolabella
- Dalton Vigh
- Dan Stulbach
- Daniel Ávila
- Daniel Boaventura
- Daniel Dantas
- Daniel de Oliveira
- Daniel Filho
- Daniel Satti
- Danilo Mesquita
- Danton Mello
- Darlan Cunha
- Davi Santos
- David Cardoso
- David Junior (actor)
- Dedé Santana
- Dionísio Azevedo
- Dhu Moraes
- Domingos Montagner
- Duda Wendling

=== E ===
- Edson Celulari
- Eduardo Conde
- Eduardo Galvão
- Eduardo Lago
- Eduardo Moscovis
- Eduardo Munniz
- Eike Duarte
- Elias Gleizer
- Eliezer Gomes
- Emiliano Queiroz
- Emílio de Mello
- Eriberto Leão

=== F ===
- Fábio Assunção
- Fábio Audi
- Fábio Lago
- Fábio Júnior
- Fábio Porchat
- Felipe Folgosi
- Felipe Neto
- Felipe Simas
- Fernando Almeida
- Fernando Ramos da Silva
- Fernando Torres
- Fiuk
- Flávio Galvão
- Flávio Migliaccio
- Floriano Peixoto
- Francisco Cuoco
- Francisco Dantas

=== G ===
- Gabriel Braga Nunes
- Gabriel Leone
- Gabriel Wainer
- Geraldo Hauers Alves
- Geraldo Del Rey
- Gero Camilo
- Gésio Amadeu
- Gianfrancesco Guarnieri
- Grande Otelo
- Gregório Duvivier
- Ghilherme Lobo
- Guilherme Berenguer
- Guilherme Fontes
- Guilherme Karan
- Guilherme Leme
- Guilherme Seta
- Guilherme Weber
- Guilherme Winter
- Gustavo Goulart

=== H ===
- Helber Rangel
- Henri Castelli
- Henrique Pires
- Henry Zaga
- Herval Rossano
- Hugo Carvana
- Humberto Carrão
- Humberto Martins

=== I ===
- Igor Jansen
- Igor Rickli
- Ilya São Paulo
- Irandhir Santos
- Irving São Paulo
- Isaac Bardavid
- Ivo Müller

=== J ===
- Jardel Filho
- Jayme Matarazzo
- Jean Paulo Campos
- Jece Valadão
- Jesuíta Barbosa
- Jô Soares
- João Carlos Barroso
- João Vicente de Castro
- João Vitti
- Joel Barcellos
- Joffre Soares
- John Herbert
- Jonas Bloch
- Jonathan Haagensen
- Jonatas Faro
- Jorge Dória
- Jorge Pontual
- José de Abreu
- José Dumont
- José Lewgoy
- José Loreto
- José Mayer
- Juan Darthés
- Juca de Oliveira
- Juliano Cazarré
- Júlio Andrade
- Júlio Rocha

=== K ===
- Kayky Brito
- Kaysar Dadour
- Kito Junqueira
- Klebber Toledo
- Konstantino Atan

=== L ===
- Lauro Corona
- Lázaro Ramos
- Leandro Firmino
- Leonardo Medeiros
- Leonardo Vieira
- Leonardo Villar
- Lima Duarte
- Lino Facioli
- Lourdes de Oliveira
- Luciano Szafir
- Luigi Baricelli
- Luis Gustavo
- Luís Melo
- Luiz Carlos Tourinho
- Luiz Carlos Vasconcelos

=== M ===
- Malvino Salvador
- Manuel da Nóbrega
- Marcello Antony
- Marcello Melo Jr.
- Marcello Novaes
- Marcelo Adnet
- Marcelo Serrado
- Márcio Garcia
- Marco Luque
- Marco Miranda
- Marco Nanini
- Marco Pigossi
- Marcos Caruso
- Marcos Mion
- Marcos Palmeira
- Marcos Pasquim
- Marcos Paulo
- Marcos Pitombo
- Marcos Winter
- Mário Cardoso
- Mário Frias
- Mário Lago
- Matheus Nachtergaele
- Maurício Destri
- Maurício do Valle
- Maurício Mattar
- Mauro Mendonça
- Max Fercondini
- Mazzaropi
- Miele
- Miguel Falabella
- Miguel Magno
- Miguel Thiré
- Milhem Cortaz
- Milton Gonçalves
- Milton Ribeiro
- Murilo Benício
- Murilo Rosa
- Mussum

=== N ===
- Nelson Dantas
- Nelson Xavier
- Ney Latorraca
- Neymar
- Nicolas Prattes
- Nildo Parente
- Nizo Neto
- Norton Nascimento
- Nuno Leal Maia

=== O ===
- Orion Ximenes Filho
- Orlando Drummond
- Oscar Filho
- Oscarito
- Oswaldo Loureiro
- Oswaldo Louzada
- Otávio Augusto
- Otávio Müller
- Othon Bastos

=== P ===
- Paoletti
- Paulo Autran
- Paulo Betti
- Paulo César Pereio
- Paulo Caruso
- Paulo Goulart
- Paulo Gracindo
- Paulo Gustavo
- Paulo José
- Paulo Miklos
- Paulo Porto
- Paulo Silvino
- Pedro Cardoso
- Pedro Neschling
- Perry Salles
- Petrônio Gontijo
- Piolin
- Plínio Marcos

=== R ===
- Rafael Almeida
- Rafael Baronesi
- Rafael Cardoso
- Rafael Cortez
- Rafael Miguel
- Rafael L. Silva
- Rafael Vitti
- Raul Cortez
- Raw Leiba
- Reginaldo Faria
- Renato Aragão
- Reynaldo Gianecchini
- Ricardo Blat
- Ricardo Pereira
- Ricardo Tozzi
- Ricky Tavares
- Robertchay Domingues da Rocha Filho
- Roberto Guilherme
- Rodolfo Arena
- Rodolfo Bottino
- Rodolfo Mayer
- Rodolfo Valente
- Rodrigo Faro
- Rodrigo Hilbert
- Rodrigo Lombardi
- Rodrigo Rodrigues
- Rodrigo Santoro
- Rodrigo Simas
- Roger Gobeth
- Rolando Boldrin
- Rômulo Arantes
- Rômulo Neto
- Ronald Golias
- Ronny Kriwat
- Rubens de Falco

=== S ===
- Sacha Bali
- Selton Mello
- Sérgio Abreu
- Sérgio Britto
- Sérgio Guizé
- Sérgio Hingst
- Sérgio Hondjakoff
- Sergio Kato
- Sérgio Mamberti
- Sérgio Marone
- Sérgio Menezes
- Sérgio Reis
- Sérgio Viotti
- Sidney Magal
- Silvio de Abreu
- Stênio Garcia

=== T ===
- Tarcísio Meira
- Tarcísio Filho
- Tato Gabus Mendes
- Théo Becker
- Thiago de Los Reyes
- Thiago Fragoso
- Thiago Lacerda
- Thiago Martins
- Thomás Aquino
- Thomaz Costa
- Tiago Abravanel
- Tião Macalé
- Tom Cavalcante
- Tonico Pereira
- Tony Ferreira
- Tony Ramos
- Tony Tornado
- Turíbio Ruiz

=== V ===
- Victor Mature
- Victor Wagner
- Vladimir Brichta

=== W ===
- Wagner Moura
- Walmor Chagas
- Walter Breda
- Wálter Forster
- Werner Schünemann
- Wesley Guimarães

=== Z ===
- Zacarias
- Zé do Caixão

== Actresses ==
=== A ===
- Ada Chaseliov
- Adelaide Chiozzo
- Adriana Alves
- Adriana Birolli
- Adriana Esteves
- Adriane Garcia
- Adriana Lessa
- Adriana Prieto
- Adriane Galisteu
- Agatha Moreira
- Alanis Guillen
- Alda Garrido
- Aldine Müller
- Alessandra Maestrini
- Alessandra Negrini
- Alexandra Marzo
- Alexandra Richter
- Alice Braga
- Alice Wegmann
- Aline Dahlen
- Aline Dias
- Alinne Moraes
- Amanda Magalhães
- Amandha Lee
- Ana Beatriz Nogueira
- Ana Botafogo
- Ana Hikari
- Ana Lima (actress)
- Ana Lúcia Torre
- Ana Maria Braga
- Ana Maria Magalhães
- Ana Paula Arósio
- Ana Rosa
- Andréa Beltrão
- Andréia Horta
- Anecy Rocha
- Ângela Vieira
- Angélica
- Angelina Muniz
- Anna Sophia Folch
- Anilza Leoni
- Aracy Balabanian
- Aracy Cortes
- Ariclê Perez
- Ariela Massotti
- Arieta Corrêa
- Arlete Salles
- Aurora Miranda

=== B ===
- Babi Xavier
- Bárbara Paz
- Beatriz Segall
- Bel Kutner
- Bella Campos
- Bella Piero
- Berta Loran
- Bete Mendes
- Beth Goulart
- Betty Faria
- Betty Gofman
- Betty Lago
- Bia Nunnes
- Bia Seidl
- Bianca Bin
- Bianca Byington
- Bruna Caram
- Bianca Castanho
- Bianca Comparato
- Bianca Rinaldi
- Bibi Ferreira
- Bruna Griphao
- Bruna Linzmeyer
- Bruna Lombardi
- Bruna Marquezine

=== C ===
- Cacau Protásio
- Cacilda Becker
- Camila Márdila
- Camila Morgado
- Camila Pitanga
- Camila Queiroz
- Camilla Amado
- Carla Camurati
- Carla Diaz
- Carla Marins
- Carla Regina
- Carmem Silva
- Carmen Miranda
- Carmen Santos
- Carmen Silva
- Carol Abras
- Carolina Dieckmann
- Carolina Ferraz
- Carolina Kasting
- Caroline Abras
- Cássia Kis Magro
- Cássia Linhares
- Cecília Dassi
- Chica Xavier
- Christiana Ubach
- Christiane Torloni
- Christine Fernandes
- Cidinha Campos
- Cissa Guimarães
- Clara Tiezzi
- Clarice Falcão
- Clarisse Abujamra
- Cláudia Abreu
- Cláudia Jimenez
- Cláudia Magno
- Cláudia Ohana
- Cláudia Raia
- Cléo Pires
- Cleyde Yáconis
- Cris Vianna
- Cristiana Oliveira
- Cristina Pereira
- Cynthia Falabella
- Cyria Coentro

=== D ===
- Daisy Lucidi
- Daniela Escobar
- Daniela Perez
- Daniele Moreno
- Daniele Suzuki
- Danielle Winits
- Danni Carlos
- Dayenne Mesquita
- Debby Lagranha
- Débora Bloch
- Débora Duarte
- Débora Falabella
- Débora Nascimento
- Deborah Evelyn
- Deborah Secco
- Denise Del Vecchio
- Denise Dumont
- Denise Fraga
- Dercy Gonçalves
- Dina Sfat
- Dira Paes
- Dirce Migliaccio
- Djenane Machado
- Dorinha Duval
- Drica Moraes

=== E ===
- Eliane Giardini
- Elisa Lucinda
- Elisa Volpatto
- Elizabeth Savalla
- Elizângela
- Elke Maravilha
- Ellen Rocche
- Eloísa Mafalda
- Emanuelle Araújo
- Erika Januza
- Etty Fraser
- Eva Todor
- Eva Wilma

=== F ===
- Fabiana Karla
- Fabíula Nascimento
- Fafá de Belém
- Fernanda de Freitas
- Fernanda Lima
- Fernanda Machado
- Fernanda Montenegro
- Fernanda Paes Leme
- Fernanda Rodrigues
- Fernanda Souza
- Fernanda Torres
- Fernanda Vasconcellos
- Fernanda Young
- Fiorella Mattheis
- Flávia Alessandra
- Florinda Bolkan
- Francisca Queiroz
- Françoise Forton

=== G ===
- Gabi Lopes
- Gabriela Alves
- Gabriela Duarte
- Gabriela Medvedovsky
- Gianne Albertoni
- Gilda de Abreu
- Giovanna Antonelli
- Giovanna Ewbank
- Gisele Bündchen
- Giselle Itié
- Giulia Benite
- Giulia Gam
- Giullia Buscacio
- Glauce Rocha
- Glória Menezes
- Glória Pires
- Graziella Moretto
- Graziella Schmitt
- Grazielli Massafera
- Guta Stresser

=== H ===
- Hanna Romanazzi
- Helen Ganzarolli
- Helena Fernandes
- Helena Ignez
- Helena Ranaldi
- Heloísa Helena
- Heloísa Jorge
- Heloísa Périssé
- Henriette Morineau

=== I ===
- Ida Gomes
- Ilka Soares
- Imara Reis
- Inez Viegas
- Inezita Barroso
- Ingra Liberato
- Ingrid Guimarães
- Iracema de Alencar
- Irene Ravache
- Isabel Fillardis
- Isabela Garcia
- Isabela Souza
- Isabella Santoni
- Isabella Scherer
- Isabelle Drummond
- Isadora Ribeiro
- Ísis Valverde
- Ítala Nandi
- Ivete Sangalo

=== J ===
- Jackeline Petkovic
- Jacqueline Laurence
- Jade Picon
- Jandira Martini
- Jessica Córes
- Jéssika Alves
- Joana Fomm
- Júlia Almeida
- Julia Dalavia
- Julia Konrad
- Júlia Lemmertz
- Juliana Alves
- Juliana Baroni
- Juliana Carneiro da Cunha
- Juliana Didone
- Juliana Knust
- Juliana Lohmann
- Juliana Martins
- Juliana Paes
- Juliana Paiva
- Juliana Schalch
- Juliana Silveira
- Julianne Trevisol
- Jussara Freire

=== K ===
- Karin Hils
- Karin Rodrigues
- Karina Bacchi
- Karina Perez
- Karine Teles
- Kate Hansen
- Katiuscia Canoro
- Kéfera Buchmann
- Klara Castanho

=== L ===
- Lady Francisco
- Laila Garin
- Laila Zaid
- Larissa Manoela
- Larissa Maciel
- Larissa Queiroz
- Laura Cardoso
- Laura Neiva
- Lara Rodrigues
- Lavínia Vlasak
- Léa Garcia
- Leandra Leal
- Leila Lopes
- Leila Diniz
- Lélia Abramo
- Leona Cavalli
- Letícia Colin
- Letícia Persiles
- Letícia Sabatella
- Letícia Spiller
- Lídia Mattos
- Lidi Lisboa
- Lígia Cortez
- Lília Cabral
- Lilian Lemmertz
- Liliana Castro
- Lívia Andrade
- Lolita Rodrigues
- Louise Cardoso
- Lu Grimaldi
- Lua Blanco
- Luana Piovani
- Luana Tanaka
- Lucélia Santos
- Luciana Braga
- Lucinha Lins
- Ludmila Dayer
- Luisa Arraes
- Luiza Brunet
- Luiza Curvo
- Luiza Mariani
- Luiza Valdetaro
- Luma Costa
- Luma de Oliveira
- Lupe Gigliotti

=== M ===
- Madalena Nicol
- Maitê Proença
- Mariana Rios
- Malu Mader
- Mara Manzan
- Marcela Barrozo
- Márcia Cabrita
- Maria Alice Vergueiro
- Maria Alves
- Maria Ceiça
- Maria Della Costa
- Maria Fernanda Cândido
- Maria Flor
- Maria Gladys
- Maria João Bastos
- Maria Lúcia Dahl
- Maria Luísa Mendonça
- Maria Mariana
- Maria Maya
- Maria Ribeiro
- Maria Sílvia
- Maria Zilda
- Mariana Molina
- Mariana Ximenes
- Marieta Severo
- Marília Gabriela
- Marília Pêra
- Marilu Bueno
- Marina Ruy Barbosa
- Marisa Orth
- Marisol Ribeiro
- Marjorie Estiano
- Matilde Mastrangi
- Maximira Figueiredo
- Mayara Magri
- Maytê Piragibe
- Mel Fronckowiak
- Mel Lisboa
- Milena Toscano
- Miriam Pires
- Mônica Carvalho
- Monique Alfradique
- Monique Alves
- Morena Baccarin
- Mylla Christie

=== N ===
- Nádia Lippi
- Nair Bello
- Nana Gouvêa
- Nanda Costa
- Natália do Vale
- Natália Guimarães
- Natália Lage
- Nathalia Dill
- Nathália Rodrigues
- Nathalia Timberg
- Neusa Maria Faro
- Nicette Bruno
- Nívea Maria
- Nívea Stelmann
- Norma Bengell
- Norma Blum

=== O ===
- Odete Lara

=== P ===
- Paloma Duarte
- Paolla Oliveira
- Patrícia de Sabrit
- Patrícia França
- Patrícia Pillar
- Paula Burlamaqui
- Priscila Fantin
- Preta Gil

=== R ===
- Regiane Alves
- Regina Braga
- Regina Casé
- Regina Duarte
- Renata Fronzi
- Renata Sorrah
- Renée de Vielmond
- Rita Cléos
- Rita Guedes
- Roberta Rodrigues
- Rosamaria Murtinho
- Rosanne Mulholland
- Rosi Campos
- Rossana Ghessa
- Ruth de Souza
- Ruth Escobar

=== S ===
- Sandy Leah
- Samara Felippo
- Samantha Schmütz
- Sandra Annenberg
- Sandra Bréa
- Sandra Pêra
- Sheron Menezzes
- Silvia Pfeifer
- Simone Spoladore
- Sônia Braga
- Sophia Abrahão
- Sophie Charlotte
- Sthefany Brito
- Suely Franco
- Susana Werner
- Suzana Alves
- Suzana Vieira

=== T ===
- Taís Araújo
- Tamara Taxman
- Tammy Di Calafiori
- Tânia Alves
- Tássia Camargo
- Tatiana Issa
- Tatyane Goulart
- Tereza Seiblitz
- Thaila Ayala
- Thaís de Campos
- Thaís Pacholek
- Thalma de Freitas
- Thelma Reston
- Theresa Amayo
- Tônia Carrero

=== V ===
- Vanessa de Oliveira
- Vanessa Gerbelli
- Vanessa Giácomo
- Vanessa Lóes
- Vera Fischer
- Vera Holtz
- Vera Zimmermann
- Viétia Zangrandi
- Vida Alves
- Vivianne Pasmanter
- Viviane Victorette

=== X ===
- Xuxa Meneghel

=== Y ===
- Yanna Lavigne
- Yara Amaral
- Yara Cortes
- Yoná Magalhães

=== Z ===
- Zezé Macedo
- Zezé Motta
- Zezé Polessa
- Zilka Salaberry
- Zilda Cardoso
