= Amor e Revolução =

Brazilian telenovela

- Genre: Drama; Action
- Created by: Tiago Santiago
- Directed by: Reynaldo Boury
- Starring: Graziella Schmitt; Cláudio Lins; Gustavo Haddad; Lúcia Veríssimo; Fátima Freire; Patrícia de Sabrit; Luciana Vendramini; Giselle Tigre
- Opening theme: Roda Viva by MPB4
- Country of origin: Brazil
- Original language: Portuguese
- No. of episodes: 204

Production
- Production location: Brazil
- Running time: 60 minutes

Original release
- Network: SBT
- Release: 5 April 2011 – 13 January 2012

Amor e Revolução (English title: Love and Revolution) is a Brazilian telenovela that first aired on SBT in 2011. Written by Tiago Santiago text cooperation with Renata Dias Gomes and Miguel Paiva and directed by Reynaldo Boury.

== Cast ==
Actor	Character
Graziella Schmitt	Maria Paixão
Cláudio Lins	Major José Guerra
Nico Puig	Major Filinto Guerra
Patrícia de Sabrit	Olívia Guerra / Violeta Antunes
Thaís Pacholek	Míriam Santos Guerra
Lúcia Veríssimo	Jandira Batistelli
Licurgo Spinola	Rubens Batistelli
Reinaldo Gonzaga	General Lobo Guerra
Glauce Graieb	Ana Guerra
Mário Cardoso	Thiago Paixão
Fátima Freira	Lúcia Paixão
Paulo Leal	João Paixão
Joana Lima Verde	Stela Lira
Cláudio Cavalcanti	Geraldo Cordeiro
Gabriela Alves	Odete de Oliveira Fiel
Marcos Breda	Carlo Fiel
Gisele Tigre	Marina Campobello
Luciana Vendramini	Marcela
Gustavo Haddad	Mário Viana
Jayme Periard	delegate Aranha
Ernando Tiago	Fritz
Fábio Villa Verde	Lieutenant Telmo Rosa Ansel
Nicole Puzzi	Feliciana
Carlos Thiré	Francisco "Chico" Duarte
Lui Mendes	Jeová Santos
Isadora Ribeiro	Bianca Luz
Tiago Abravanel	Davi
Patrícia de Jesus	Nina Madeira/Natália
Antonio Petrin	Doctor Ruy Domênico Oliveira
Ivan de Almeida	Santos
Cacá Rosset	Roberto Salvatto "Beto Grande" (Big Beto)
Élcio Monteze	Luís Fagundes Muniz
Diogo Savalla Picchi	Priest Francisco Bento
Mário Borges	Demóstenes
Fábio Rhoden	Bartolomeu Fagundes Muniz
Pedro Lemos	Priest Inácio
Dani Moreno	Marta
Natália Vidal	Beth
Natasha Haydt	Heloísa Oliveira
Aimée Ubaker	Edith
Thiago Picchi	Miguel Salvatto
Isadora Petrin	Sônia Salvatto
Cidinha Milan	Madame Lola Fagundes
Camila dos Anjos	Cléo
Rogério Márcico	Augusto Fiel
Daniel Marinho	Captain Paulo Tavares
Diego Montez	Gabriel
Gustavo Lago	Hércules
Thaynara Bergamim	Alice de Oliveira Fiel
Bruna Carvalho	Lara de Oliveira Fiel
Mariusa Bregôli	Ivone
Marcelo Reis	Couto
Roberto Skora	Major Borges

Special guest star

- Samantha Dalsoglio - Vilminha

== Curiosities ==
The soap opera "Amor e Revolução" showed the first lesbian kiss in a Brazilian telenovela with actresses Gisele Tigre and Luciana Vendramini.

Tiago Santiago intended to write a telenovela about the dictatorship since 1995, when he was at Rede Globo.
