= Variações =

Variações may refer to:

- António Variações (1944–1984), Portuguese singer and songwriter
- Variações (film), 2019 film about António Variações
