= Tropicaliente =

- Genre: Telenovela
- Created by: Walter Negrão
- Starring: Herson Capri; Regina Dourado; Sílvia Pfeifer; Francisco Cuoco; Victor Fasano; Cássio Gabus Mendes; Carolina Dieckmann; Selton Mello; Stênio Garcia; Ana Rosa; Carla Marins; Márcio Garcia; Paloma Duarte; Delano Avelar; Leila Lopes; Natália Lage; Gabriela Alves
- Opening theme: "Coração da Gente"
- Composer: Elba Ramalho
- Country of origin: Brazil
- Original language: Portuguese
- No. of episodes: 194

Production
- Running time: 50 minutes

Original release
- Network: TV Globo
- Release: May 16 – December 31, 1994

Tropicaliente was a Brazilian soap opera produced and aired at 18:00 by TV Globo. It ran from May 16 to December 31, 1994, totaling 194 chapters.

Written by Walter Negrao, in collaboration with Elizabeth Jhin, Angela Lamb, Mark Silver and directed by Vinicius Vianna and Blota Gonzaga, Marcelo Gomes and Roger Traverso. The general direction was Blota Gonzaga.

== History ==
=== Synopsis ===
Ramiro is the leader of a fishing village in Fortaleza, Ceará. Married to Serena, the companion of all hours, the father of two children, Cassiano and Açucena. The guy is her boyfriend of Dalila, daughter of Ramiro's close friend, Samuel, also a fisherman, husband of Ester, who has another son, David, a young man who graduated doctor but is ashamed of his humble origins.

Letícia is the daughter of millionaire Gaspar Velazquez, a man who left the company in the hands of her daughter to enjoy life. At home, Letícia facing relationship problems with their children, Victor and Amanda. Widow and charming, she seeks a new direction for her love life. Suitors abound, as the gallant François, eyeing her beauty and fortune. To win her, he has the help of Franchico a tremendous pick with a mission: to join Letícia and François.

But Leticia is balanced with the reunion with Ramiro, the great passion of his life, which will trigger a series of conflicts, such as dating from Victor, the son of Leticia, a boy with serious psychological problems, with the sweet Açucena, the daughter of Ramiro.

== Cast ==
Actor	Character
Herson Capri	Ramiro Soares
Regina Dourado	Serena Soares
Sílvia Pfeifer	Letícia Velasquez
Victor Fasano	François Vieira da Silva
Cássio Gabus Mendes	Franchico
Carolina Dieckmann	Açucena Soares
Selton Mello	Vitor Velasquez
Paloma Duarte	Amanda Velasquez
Carla Marins	Dalila
Márcio Garcia	Cassiano Soares
Francisco Cuoco	Gaspar Velasquez
Ana Rosa	Ester
Stênio Garcia	Samuel
Natália Lage	Ana Carolina (Adrenalina)
Nívea Maria	Soledad
Delano Avelar	Davi
Leila Lopes	Olívia
Gabriela Alves	Pitanga
Guga Coelho	Luiz Roberto / Pessoa
Edney Giovenazzi	Bonfim
Lúcia Alves	Isabel
Cinira Camargo	Manoela
Karina Perez	Lilian
Branca de Camargo	Estela
Nelson Dantas	Velho Bujarrona
Cleyde Blota	Ivanilda / Hilda
João Carlos Barroso	Plínio
Lu Martan	Fred Assunção
Antonio Grassi	Conrado
Ilva Niño	Neide
Ricardo Pavão	Delegado Damasceno
Daniela Escobar	Berenice
Giovanna Antonelli	Benvinda
Mônica Fraga	Janaína
Paco Sanches	Manjubinha
Adriana Broux	Suzana

Supporting cast

- Flávio Galvão - Felipe
- Antônio Grassi - Conrado
- Bruno Giordano - Fisherman
- Jonas Bloch - Jordi (deceased husband of Letícia)
- Carolina Ferraz - Soraya Herzog

== International broadcasters of Tropicaliente ==
=== Américas ===
- Argentina: El Trece
- Ecuador: Gamavisión
- Mexico: Las Estrellas
- Paraguay: Telefuturo
- Uruguay: Teledoce

=== Europe ===
- Russia: ORT
