= Antonio Monteiro =

Antonio Monteiro is the name of:

- António Monteiro (politician) (born 1944), former foreign minister of Portugal
- António Mascarenhas Monteiro (1944–2016), former President of Cape Verde
- Antônio Monteiro Dutra (born 1973), Brazilian footballer
- António Monteiro (canoeist) (born 1972), Portuguese sprint canoer
- António Isaac Monteiro, former foreign minister of Guinea-Bissau
- Antônio Monteiro (actor) (born 1956), Brazilian actor, director and writer
- Antonio Monteiro (mathematician) (1907–1980), mathematician born in Portuguese Angola
