= Stimulation (disambiguation) =

Stimulation is the action of various agents or forms of energy (stimuli) on receptors that generate impulses that travel through nerves to the brain.

Stimulation may also refer to:

- Stimulation (album), 1961 jazz album by Johnny "Hammond" Smith
- ""Stimulation" (song), a 1986 single by Wa Wa Nee
- Stimulation, 2013 song by disclosure from their album Settle.

== Specific stimulations ==
- Well stimulation, the well activity
- Thermal laser stimulation, the defect imaging technique

== See also ==
- Stimulus (disambiguation)
- Simulation (disambiguation)
