= Geraldo Alves =

Geraldo Alves may refer to:

- Geraldo Cleofas Dias Alves (1954–1976), Brazilian footballer
- Geraldo Alves (footballer, born 1980), Portuguese retired footballer, nephew of the former
- Geraldo Hauers Alves (1935–1993), Brazilian actor
