= Marisol (Brazilian TV series) =

- Genre: Drama; Psychological thriller Mystery
- Created by: Inés Rodena
- Based on: Marisol by Inés Rodena
- Starring: Bárbara Paz; Carlos Casagrande; Carla Fiorini; Adriana Ferreyr; Jonatas Faro; Glauce Graieb; Gabriela Alves; Alexandre Frota; Christa B. Allen
- Composer: iZLER (music)
- Country of origin: Brazil
- Original language: Portuguese
- No. of seasons: 1
- No. of episodes: 181

Production
- Executive producers: SBT and Televisa
- Producer: Inés Rodena
- Production location: São Paulo
- Cinematography: Chris Manley; Cynthia Pusheck; John Smith
- Editors: Martin Nicholson; Sue Blainey; Conrad Smart
- Running time: 40 minutes
- Production company: SBT

Original release
- Network: SBT
- Release: April 9 – November 5, 2002

Related
- Marisol (original series)

Marisol was a Brazilian primetime television series that aired on SBT, starring Bárbara Paz, Carla Fiorini, Adriana Ferreyr, Carlos Casagrande, and Glauce Graieb. It is based on the original Mexican telenovela by Inés Rodena.

The series is a remake of the Mexican production of the same name and was adapted into Portuguese by Henry Zambelli, with text supervision by Ecila Pedroso and direction by Antonino Seabra, Jacques Lagôa, Henrique Martins, and David Grimberg.

Marisol premiered on April 9, 2002, and was broadcast every night at 8:30 p.m. (BRT).

The series was rerun from January 1 to March 23, 2007, in a condensed format of 60 episodes, succeeding Wounds of Love. It was rebroadcast a second time on SBT from March 5 to August 20, 2012, in 119 episodes, replacing the rerun of Glamour, and was subsequently replaced by Canavial de Paixões (Canavial of Passion).

== Overview ==
Marisol follows the story of a humble and resilient young woman who maintains her kindness and sweetness despite a life filled with hardship. She lives in a tenement with her ailing mother, Sofia, and supports them by selling paper flowers on the street. Marisol bears a deep emotional trauma due to a prominent scar on her face, sustained in a childhood accident at a park. Because of their financial difficulties, she was never able to afford surgery to remove it.

Unbeknownst to Marisol, she is the granddaughter of Dr. Augusto Lima do Vale, a wealthy businessman and owner of a major mining company. In her youth, Sofia fell in love with Roger, a man from a modest background. Her father, Dr. Augusto, disapproved of the relationship due to Roger's social status. Facing her family's prejudice, Sofia eloped with Roger. However, after Marisol was born, Roger abandoned them. Out of pride, Sofia chose not to seek help from her family.

Sofia's relationship with Roger was orchestrated by Amparo, Dr. Augusto's daughter. Amparo paid Roger to seduce Sofia and lead her away from the family. On her deathbed, Sofia regrets not having been able to provide Marisol with a better life and is saddened by the trauma her daughter carries. She attempts to reveal Marisol's true heritage and gives her a family ring. However, before she can disclose the identity of Marisol’s grandfather, Sofia dies. The ring becomes the key to uncovering Marisol’s true origins.

Marisol eventually meets Rodrigo Lima do Vale, a wealthy young man, and the two fall in love. Rodrigo is the son of Leonardo, Dr. Augusto's son, and Amparo, an ambitious woman determined to protect her own interests. Leonardo is trapped in an unhappy marriage with Amparo and seeks comfort in the arms of his lover, Zulema—who is also involved with Mario. Upon discovering Marisol’s relationship with Rodrigo, Zulema conspires to seduce Rodrigo and separate him from Marisol.

Following Sofia's death, Marisol becomes vulnerable to manipulation by Mario and Zulema. She later meets Dr. Augusto and begins working at his mansion, unaware of their familial connection. Amparo immediately despises Marisol's presence and humiliates her at every opportunity. Matters worsen when Rodrigo publicly acknowledges his relationship with Marisol. In response, Amparo, Leonardo, and Rosana—Rodrigo's gold-digging fiancée—declare war on the couple.

In an effort to destroy Marisol, Amparo rekindles her relationship with Mario, much to the dismay of her other lover, Mariano, the family's corrupt lawyer. Amparo and Mariano share a secret: Rodrigo is actually Mariano's son, not Leonardo's. During her investigation into Marisol's background, Amparo discovers that she is Sofia's daughter. Since Rodrigo is not Leonardo's biological child, Marisol is the sole legitimate heir to the Lima do Vale fortune.

To protect this secret, Amparo poisons Dr. Augusto to prevent him from learning the truth. However, she is unaware that two years prior, Dr. Augusto had already revised his will, naming Marisol as his primary heir.

== Cast ==
=== Main cast ===
- Bárbara Paz as Marisol – Endowed with gentle beauty and heartfelt emotion, Marisol is open and sincere in expressing her feelings. She is a humble, innocent, and shy young woman, largely due to a scar on her face from an accident at age six. Despite her delicate appearance, Marisol is a resilient and determined individual, prepared to face life's many challenges.
- Carlos Casa Grande as Rodrigo Lima do Vale – A handsome, well-educated, wealthy, and charismatic young man, Rodrigo is the heir to Dr. Augusto's vast fortune. Although he was raised to take over the family's mining business, one of the largest in the country, Rodrigo's true passion is painting. While his grandfather supports his dreams, his parents, Leonardo and Amparo, strongly disapprove.
- Glauce Graieb as Amparo Lima do Vale – Rodrigo's mother and the story's main antagonist. Ambitious, seductive, and selfish, Amparo comes from a modest background. She once worked as Leonardo's secretary while dating Mariano, Rodrigo's biological father. When Leonardo showed interest, Amparo saw an opportunity for social advancement and left Mariano.
- Carla Fiorini as Mimi – Marisol's loyal and humorous friend. She is deeply in love with Chico.
- Rodrigo Lombardi as Francisco "Chico" Soares – Younger brother of Mário and son of Margarida. Chico dreams of becoming a famous football goalkeeper and earning great wealth, although his clumsiness and lack of athletic skill make this unlikely. Nonetheless, he is kind-hearted and of strong moral character.
- Juan Alba as Dr. Rubens Linhares – A handsome, intelligent, and wealthy physician of great integrity. He works at a clinic in his hometown alongside his father, Dr. Álvaro. Rubens is Rodrigo’s childhood friend and has two siblings, Camila and Daniel. He and his father later help rescue Marisol.
- Roberto Arduim as Leonardo Lima do Vale – Husband of Amparo and son of Dr. Augusto. Leonardo is weak-willed and easily manipulated by Amparo. Although nominally president of the mining company, real control remains with Dr. Augusto. Leonardo's lack of authority frustrates Amparo and fuels her resentment.

=== Recurring cast ===
Actor	Character
Alexandre Frota	Mário Soares
Gabriela Alves	Zulema de Carvalho
Serafim Gonzalez	Dr. Augusto Lima do Vale
Rosaly Papadopol	Margarida Soares
Vanessa Vholker	Rosana Valverde
Martha Mellinger	Carmem Figueiredo
Carlo Briani	Dr. Mariano Reis
Roberto Arduim	Leonardo Lima do Vale
Turíbio Ruiz	Basílio
Marisol Ribeiro	Alessandra Figueiredo
Chica Lopes	Dolores
Paulo Leite	Dr. Álvaro Linhares
Samantha Monteiro	Malu
Nicole Puzzi	Rebeca Linhares
Thiago Picchi	Daniel
Francisca Queiroz	Camila Linhares
Abrahão Farc	Dr. Heitor
Rosana Penna	Constanza
Gabriela Rabelo	Branca
Míriam Lins	Sofia Lima do Vale
Rodolfo de Freitas	Alberto
Douglas Aguillar	Filipe
Luiz Carlos Bahia	Joaquim
Breno Bonin	Rogério Mendes
Arlete Montenegro	Débora Valverde
Sebastião Campos	Adolfo Valverde
Cleide Queiroz	Zalmúdia
Rosana Muniz	Dorina
Márcio Mehiel	Nicolas
Jacqueline Cordeiro	Teresa
Flávio Cardoso	Rui
Paulo Vasconcellos	Zeca
Luah Galvão	Teca
Dayse Pinheiro	Cássia
Gérson Marcch	"Pulga"
Yañes Miura	'"Piolho"
Alexandre Jábali	Gervásio
Magali Biff	Inezita
Vera Zimmermann	Sandra Queiroz
Jonathan Nogueira	Eduardo (Chupa-Cabra)
Jonatas Faro	Gil Soares
Adriana Ferreyr	Vanessa Lima do Vale
Alexandre Barros	Raul Montemar
Karina Bacchi	Sabrina Montemar
Mariana Dubois	Mariana
Petrônio Gontijo	João Vicente
Maria Estela	Andréia Marcondes
César Pezzuoli	Diego Marcondes
Mayara Constantino	Yole
Kadu Torres	Leonel
Tereza Piffer	Romilda
Eliana Rocha	Romualda
Raíssa Medeiros	Sofia (Toninho)
Sophia Bisilliat	Vilma
Sérgio Amorim	Larry
Patrícia Salvador	Angélica
Fânia Espinosa	Gelatina
Paulo Caruso	Gabriel
Chico Abreu	Totó
Lucélia Machiavelli	Maria Bonita
Delurdes Moraes	Loreta

== Development and production ==
Marisol was the third television series co-produced by SBT and Televisa.

== Reception ==
In April 2012, SBT aired the third rerun of Marisol, which achieved high viewership ratings.

== Soundtrack ==
Soundtrack Marisol

Soundtrack album by Various
- Released: 2002
- Director: Cayon Gadia

=== Awards and nominations ===
At the 38th Contigo! Television Awards, Marisol received multiple nominations, including:

- Best Drama (Melhor Novela)
- Best Actor (Melhor Ator): Carlos Casagrande
- Best Actress (Melhor Atriz): Bárbara Paz
- Best Supporting Actor (Melhor Ator Coadjuvante): Juan Alba
- Best Supporting Actress (Melhor Atriz Coadjuvante): Carla Fioroni
- Best Actress in a Comedy Role (Melhor Atriz Cômica): Carla Fioroni
- Best Child Actress (Melhor Atriz Infantil): Raíssa Medeiros
- Best Villain – Female (Melhor Vilã): Glauce Graieb
- Best Villain – Male (Melhor Vilão): Alexandre Frota
- Most Promising Actor (Melhor Ator Revelação): Jonathan Nogueira
- Most Promising Actress (Melhor Atriz Revelação): Francisca Queiroz
- Best Romantic Couple (Melhor Par Romântico): Carlos Casagrande and Bárbara Paz
- Best Director (Melhor Diretor): Henrique Martins (also nominated for A Pequena Travessa, 2002)
- Best Costume Design (Melhor Figurino): Gilda Bandeira de Mello (also for A Pequena Travessa, 2002)
- Best Makeup (Melhor Maquiagem): Alcir Mathias (also for A Pequena Travessa, 2002)
- Best Production Design (Melhor Cenografia): João Nascimento (also for A Pequena Travessa, 2002)
