= Belmonte (TV series) =

- Genre: Romance; Melodrama; Mystery
- Created by: Artur Ribeiro
- Developed by: Plural Entertainment
- Directed by: António Borges Correia
- Starring: Filipe Duarte; Graziella Schmitt; João Catarré; Marco D'Almeida; Diogo Amaral; Lourenço Ortigão; Manuela Couto (see more)
- Opening theme: Amor com Amor se Paga by André Sardet
- Ending theme: Amor com Amor se Paga by André Sardet
- Country of origin: Portugal
- Original language: Portuguese
- No. of episodes: 259

Production
- Running time: 50 min

Original release
- Network: TVI
- Release: September 5, 2014

Belmonte is a Portuguese telenovela broadcast and produced by TVI. It was written by Artur Ribeiro and adapted from the Chilean telenovela Hijos del Monte. The telenovela premiered on September 22, 2013 and its last episode aired on September 5, 2014, totaling a number of 259 episodes. It was broadcast in the primetime at 9pm (UTC) and then switched to the 11pm (UTC) slot. Some of the first scenes were filmed in Brazil, but the telenovela was mainly filmed in Portugal, in the region of Alentejo.

It is the fifth Portuguese telenovela (the third from TVI) nominated for Best telenovela in the 2014 Emmy International.

== Plot ==
In the Municipality of Estremoz, in the Alentejo, five children, adopted by the Alentejo patriarch Emílio Belmonte (António Capelo), manage a business group named Belmonte, owner of companies in the business of winemaking, oils, marble exploration, hunting tourism, and financial investments and real estate.

The Belmonte family is linked to the ancient history of the region, but Emílio, the last descendant of the family, married Clarisse, a woman who could not have children and, as such, to the survival of the name, the couple had to adopt children. Each of the four older brothers, João (Filipe Duarte), José (João Catarré), Pedro (Diogo Amaral) and Carlos (Marco D'Almeida), is responsible, respectively, for one of the business areas, while Lucas (Lourenço Ortigão), the youngest, was studying photography in London. Business, despite the crisis, is stable and family harmony is evident, continuing the five brothers to live together in the family's homestead.

While in the Alentejo are made some preparations for the engagement between João and Julieta (Carla Galvão) - daughter of another older family from the region, but bankrupt, the Milheiro family - in Brazil, Emílio is with Sofia (Manuela Couto) and her daughter, Paula (Graziella Schmitt), revealing that Emílio has another family.

Sofia was Emílio's lover and became pregnant at the time Clarisse was ill with terminal cancer. Because Sofia refused to abort, Emílio paid her to move to Brazil where she gave birth to Paula, who nobody ever told was the daughter of an extramarital relationship growing with the false story that the father spends most of his time in Portugal because of business, in hope to one day sell it to reform in Brazil and stay with his Brazilian family.

After a day of happiness «in family», on his farm in the Pantanal (Brazil), Emílio returns to Portugal, leaving Paula in tears, as always, in time to say goodbye. What she doesn't know is that she is saying goodbye to her father forever. On the way to the airport, Emílio sees what appears to be a road accident and decides to stop to help. But what appeared to be an accident is actually a fatal ambush for Emílio planned by his son Carlos.

== Cast ==
=== Main ===
- Filipe Duarte - João Belmonte
- Graziella Schmitt - Paula Belmonte
- João Catarré - José Belmonte
- Marco D'Almeida - Carlos Belmonte
- Diogo Amaral - Pedro Belmonte
- Lourenço Ortigão - Lucas Belmonte
- Manuela Couto - Sofia Caneira/Belmonte

=== Secondary ===
- Carla Galvão- Julieta Milheiro
- Joana Solnado - Inês Belmonte
- Elsa Galvão - Filomena Guerreiro
- João Didelet - Rafael Guerreiro
- Rita Calçada Bastos - Ana Craft
- Romeu Costa - Henrique Craft
- Tomás Alves - Hugo Queirós
- Luísa Cruz - Susana Marques «1st sergeant»
- Sara Matos - Marta Nogueira
- Sílvia Rizzo - Carol Molina
- Laura Galvão - Joana Brito
- Almeno Gonçalves - Gustavo Castelo
- Paulo Pires - Padre Artur Ribas
- Bruna Quintas - Rosário Milheiro
- Helena Laureano - Anabela Milheiro
- José Wallenstein - Miguel Milheiro
- Sabri Lucas - Flip
- Sara Prata - Íris
- Norman McCallum - Alistair Conrad
- Sofia Grillo - Beatriz Figueira
- Adriano Carvalho - Joaquim Figueira
- Maria de Sousa - Luísa Ferreira
- António Melo - Fernando Ferreira
- Sandra Santos - Sónia
- Filippo Fiumani - Arturo

=== Special Participation ===
- Estrela Novais - D. Maria

=== Children ===
- Afonso Carlos - António Figueira
- Manuel Custódia - Ivo Craft
- Maria Carolina Iláco - Leonor Guerreiro

=== Recurring ===
- António Capelo - Emílio Belmonte
- Sofia Ribeiro - Laura Pires

== Awards ==
Year	Award	Category	Result
2014	42nd International Emmy Awards	Best Telenovela	Nominated
