= Patrícia de Sabrit =

Brazilian actress and television presenter

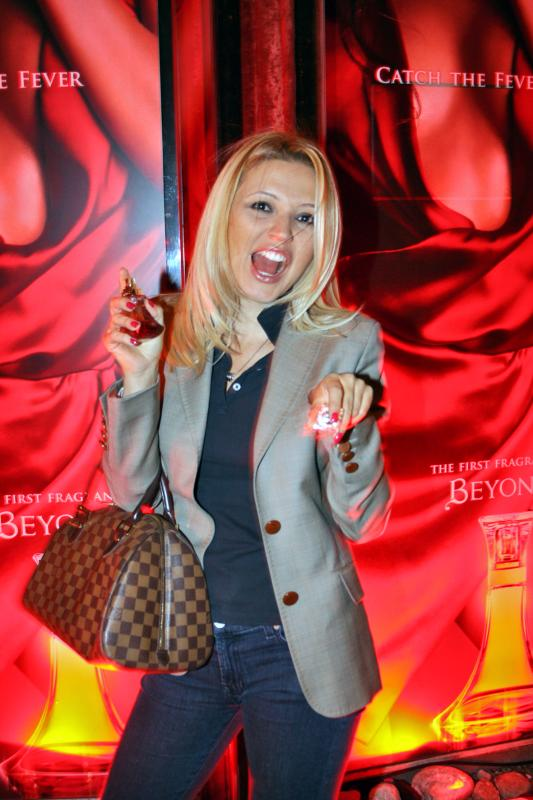
- Sabrit in 2010
- Born: Patrícia Renaux Chamagne de Sabrit; April 27, 1975 (age 50); Brusque, Santa Catarina, Brazil
- Occupations: Actress; presenter
- Years active: 1992–2001, 2011–2012, 2018
- Spouses: Fábio Júnior (m. 2001; div. 2001) Michael Hansen (m. 2003; div. 2013) Olivier Murguet (m. 2014)
- Children: 1

Patrícia Renaux Chamagne de Sabrit (born April 27, 1975), best known as Patrícia de Sabrit, is a Brazilian actress and television presenter.

== Personal life ==
Sabrit was born and raised in Brusque, in the state of Santa Catarina, daughter of Marina and Thiery de Sabrit. She is of French and German descent. Patrícia is the cousin of label consultant Fabio Arruda. In 1997, in parallel to her acting career, she began studying cinema at the Pontifical Catholic University of São Paulo (PUC), where she graduated in 2000.

In 2000 she began dating Brazilian singer Fábio Júnior, marrying him in 2001. On June 12, however, the two announced their separation after only six months of marriage.

At the end of 2001, Patricia traveled to Europe and met Belgian businessman Michael Hansen, with whom she started dating. The two remained in a distance relationship for two years. In 2003, he moved to Brazil. In the same year, Patrícia abdicated her career to fit the universe of her boyfriend, becoming a more present figure in the high society of the city of São Paulo and in philanthropic events, accompanying him also in business trips.

On May 8, 2007 the only son of the couple, Maximilian de Sabrit Hansen, was born at the Albert Einstein Hospital in São Paulo, Brazil. In 2009 Patricia moved to Belgium with her husband and in 2013, after twelve years together, the relationship ended. In the same year, still living in Europe, Patricia began dating Olivier Murguet, a Frenchman who is the president of the multinational Renault. In 2014 the couple moved to the United States.

== Filmography ==
=== Television ===
Year	Title	Role	Notes
1993	Olho no Olho	Maria Cláudia de Moraes (Cacau)	
1994	Você Decide	Sandrinha / Mariana	Episode: "O Despertar da Primavera"; Episode: "A Bolsa ou a Vida"
1995	Estação Futebol	TV host	
1995	Futebol Paulista e Você	TV host	
1995	Malhação	Micaela Batista	Season 1
1996	Antônio dos Milagres	Clara de Assis / Santa Clara	
1996	Colégio Brasil	Júlia	
1997	A Filha do Demônio	Ana Carolina Gusmão	
1998	Walking Show	TV host	
1998	Pérola Negra	Pérola Marques Montefiori / Eva Pacheco Oliveira	
2000	Vidas Cruzadas	Letícia Oliveira de Barros / Luísa	
2002–03	A Noite É uma Criança	Reporter	
2011	Amor e Revolução	Olívia Guerra / Violeta	
2018	Z4	Maria Lúcia Molinari Ribeiro	

== Stage ==
Year	Title	Role
1992	O Namoro	Sara
1992	Se Você me Ama	Jéssica
