= Faça Sua História =

Brazilian television series

Faça Sua História is a TV series of Brazilian TV Globo Network, aired from April to December 2008. The series pilot was led by Stepan Nercessian, aired on December 27, 2007. Later on 6 April 2008 the series debuted with Vladimir Brichta as the protagonist Oswald.

== Pilot cast ==
- Stepan Nercessian – Oswald
- Luiz Gustavo – Passenger
- Paula Burlamaqui – Marlicene
- Rita Guedes – Ivonete
- André Gonçalves – Leleco
- Ernesto Piccolo – Haroldão
- Lidi Lisboa – Maria Eleuza
- Luis Miranda – Maribel
- Ana Paula Peter – Dorothy

Special appearances

- Ney Latorraca – Father Creuze
- Arlindo Cruz – himself

== Series cast ==
Leading roles

- Vladimir Brichta – Oswald
- Carla Marins – Adalgisa (Gigi)
- Irene Ravache – Nadir

Secondary roles

- Luís Melo – Delegate Nicanor
- Júlio Rocha – Jackson Maia
- Gesi Amadeu – ibis
- Fabio Lake – Cacilda
- Diogo Kropotoff – Oswaldirzinho
- Elisabeth Petrenko – Maria Eduarda

=== 1° Episódio - Quem Não Tem Um Caso Prá Contar ===
- Tony Ramos - Passageiro
- Lidi Lisboa - Francineide
- Luís Miranda - Dejair
- Ricardo Alegre - Turcão
- Robert Pacheco - Leleco
- Leonardo Arantes - Coisa Ruim
- ABM de Aguiar - Assaltantes

=== 2° Episódio - A Vingadora Capixaba ===
- Sidney Magal - Passageiro
- Giselle Itié - Maria da Glória
- Mateus Solano - Cléber Augusto
- Larissa Bracher - Vanessa
- Jorge Lucas - Pererinha

=== 3º Episódio - O Califa de Copacabana ===
- Duda Ribeiro - Passageiro
- Lúcio Mauro - Baby de Moraes
- Maitê Proença - Bebete
- Cristina Prochaska - Carmem Lúcia
- Gabriela Alves - Neusa
- Michelle Martins - Angélica
- Quitéria Chagas - Selminha
- Cláudio Caparica - Maitre do restaurante

=== 4º Episódio - Oswaldir Superstar ===
- Ernesto Piccolo - Passageiro
- Milena Toscano - Cíntia
- Danton Mello - Johnny Valenti
- Flávio Baiocchi - Bruce
- Jorge Lucas - Pererinha

=== 5º Episódio - Miss Garota Suborbana ===
- Karina Dohme - Andressa
- Maurício Mattar - Passageiro
- Alonso Gonçalves - Napoleão Santana
- Dig Dutra - Joseane
- Sabrina Rosa - Gislaine
- Wagner Trindade - Adílson
- Aline Fanju - Dinorá
- Márcio Fonseca - Maribel
- Luciano Vidigal - Meio-Quilo
- Lívia Nascimento - Janaína
- Arley Velloso - Inácio Benevides
- Liz Moraes - Nívia

=== 6º Episódio - A Estrela da TV ===
- Maria Zilda Bethlem - Dora Maria
- Antônio Pitanga - Passageiro
- Kiko Mascarenhas - Dorgival
- Pia Manfroni - Malvina
- Maria Eduarda - figurinista

=== 7° Episódio - Caramuru ===
- Guilherme Piva - Passageiro
- Bento Ribeiro - Caramuru
- Ricardo Nunes - São Jorge
- Nana Gouvêa - Veranista
- Ricardo Pavão - Lilico
- Marcello Gonçalves - Deulino
- Eduardo Magalhães - Genésio
- Jamil Velazquez - Juca
- William Vita - homem misterioso
- Hilton Castro

=== 8° Episódio - Cabritada Mal-Sucedida ===
- Natália do Vale - Passageira
- Carlos Meceni - Seu Crécio
- Marcelo Flores - Sandoval
- Jonathan Azevedo - Mais-Preto
- Marcello Melo - bandido de Seu Clécio
- Duse Nacaratti - senhora que apresenta o novo táxi a Oswaldir
- Caco Baresi - policial
- Marcelo Portinari - bandido

=== 9° Episódio - O Noivo Sumiu! ===
- Márcia Cabrita - Passageira
- Henri Castelli - Pedrão
- Suzana Pires - Jennifer
- Ana Paula Pedro - Kátia
- Luiz Magnelli - Batista

=== 10° Episódio - Olho de Sogra ===
- Roberto Battaglin - Luís Augusto
- Karina Mello - Laura
- Malu Valle - Dorotéia
- Mariana Vaz - Isabela
- Thiago Fragoso - Tiago
- Luli Müller - Bruna
- Hugo Resende - Marcos

=== 11° Episódio - Duas É Demais! ===
- Paulo César Grande - Passageiro
- Ellen Rocche - Stefany
- Chico Terrah - Bigú
- Thogun - Miúdo

=== 12° Episódio - Eterno Amor ===
- Luiza Mariani - Passageira
- Mário Hermeto - Gilson
- Débora Lamm - Ivonete
- Marcelo Torreão - Adelsão
- Márcio Machado - Linguiça

=== 13° Episódio - O Último Casal Feliz ===
- Louise Cardoso - Verônica
- Débora Lamm - Ivonete
- Leonardo Netto - Celso
- Maria Zilda Bethlem - Letícia Barros

=== 14° Episódio - A Última Farra ===
- Claudia Mauro - Passageira
- John Herbert - Mariozinho
- Lafayette Galvão - Ernesto
- Isaac Bardavid - Garrastazu
- Paulo Ascenção - Policial Martins

=== 15° Episódio - Mulher no Volante ===
- José D'Artagnan Júnior - Passageiro
- Harildo Deda

=== 16º Episódio - O Dia Mais Feliz da Minha Vida ===
- Gilberto Miranda - Passageiro
- Zeca Pagodinho - ele mesmo
- Rodrigo Rangel - Policial Silva
- Maria de Sá - senhora
- Anídia Martins - senhora
- Vera Maria Monteiro - Dona Sueli
- Celma Braga - senhora
- Suzana Pires - Jennifer

=== 17º Episódio - Um Cadáver Ilustre ===
- Fúlvio Stefanini - Passageiro
- Gláucio Gomes - Alberico
- Joél Reinoso - Juraci

=== 18º Episódio - Todo Mundo Louco ===
- Zéu Britto - Moacir
- Bete Mendes - Iracema
- Anna Cotrim - Dr. Nadine
- Roberto Oliveira

=== 19º Episódio - A Rainha da Uva ===
- Tião D'Ávila - Aristeu
- Guida Viana - Idalina
- Fiorella Mattheis - Manuela

=== 20º Episódio - Em Nome dos Filhos ===
- Íris Bustamante - Sílvia
- Gilberto Hernandez - Paulo
- Ângelo Antônio - Frei Marcos
- Carolyna Aguiar - Dadá
- Adriana Zattar - Lia
- Célia Virginia - Creide
- Cláudio Andrade - Julinho
- Arnaldo Klay - Fabrício
- Cláudio Cinti - Pedro
- Eliene Narducci - Carmem
- Luiz Otávio Moraes - Dr Moreira

=== 21º Episódio - O Estouro da Boiada ===
- Augusto Madeira - Passageiro
- Luiz Carlos Vasconcelos - João Grande
- Elisa Lucinda - Astéria
- Juliana Alves - Domingas
- Sabrina Rosa - Sgundina
- Contia Rosa - Tercina
- Michelly Campos - Quartina
- Luana Xavier - Quintina
- Livia Thaynara - Sestina
- Daniele Aguiar - Sabatina
- Marcelo Gonçalves - Passo Preto
- José Mauro Brant - Murilo Porco
- Babú Santana - Boca Vedo
- Jorge Lucas - Lindomar

=== 22º Episódio - Corrida Noturna ===
- Marcos Frota - Passageiro
- Val Perre - MV Tião
- Ed Oliveira - Cabeça
- Lugui Palhares - Arnoldão
- Luciana Pacheco - Regininha

=== 23º Episódio - A Herança de Napoleão ===
- Fernanda Paes Leme - Evelyn
- Alonso Gonçalves - Napoleão Santana

=== 24º Episódio - Amigo é Para Essas Coisas ===
- Yaçanã Martins - Passageira
- Larissa Bracher - Melinha Lee
- Bruna Bueno - Shirley

=== 25º Episódio - A Deusa Extraterrestre ===
- Thelmo Fernandes - Normando
- Valéria Bohm - Marialva

=== 26º Episódio - Bandeira 5 ===
- Nizo Neto - Passageiro
- Juliana Knust - Vanessa
- Bruno Padilha - Ricardinho

=== 27º Episódio - Álbum de Família ===
- Ilva Niño - Passageira
- Cristiana Oliveira - Talita
- Carlos Vieira - professor de simulação de parto
- Luiz Octavio de Moraes - médico
- Aline Fanju - Passageira

=== 28º Episódio - A Guerra de Tróia ===
- Kadu Moliterno - Passageiro
- Juliana Knust - Vanessa
- Roney Villela - Raimundão
- Thiago Varella - Papagaio

=== 29º Episódio - Sob As Ordens de Mamãe ===
- Irene Ravache - Nadir
- Luís Melo - Delegado Nicanor
- Jayme Del Cueto - Gabriel Salvador

=== 30º Episódio - A Matadora ===
- Armando Babaioff - Passageiro
- Camila Morgado - Maria Teresa, a Maníaca da Tesoura

=== 31º Episódio - O Sósia ===
- Ricardo Kosovski - Passageiro
- Giselle Itié - Guadalupe
- Charles Myara - gerente de banco
- Mário Hermeto - Candeias
- Adriana Birolli - Passageira
- Chris Moniz
- Marcelo Assumpção
- Leo Alberty

=== 32º Episódio - A Falta que Ela me faz ===
- Nuno Leal Maia - Passageiro
- Paola Oliveira - Georgette

=== 33º Episódio - Cinema Novissímo ===
- Buza Ferraz - Passageiro
- Luana Piovani - Sandra Sandrelli
- Jackson Costa - Nelson Roque
- Marcelo Olinto - Assunção

=== 34º Episódio - O Feitiço da Cueca ===
- Marcos Breda - Passageiro
- Luana Piovani - Sandra Sandrelli
- Jackson Costa - Nelson Roque
- Isaac Bardavid - José Carlos Barreira

=== 35º Episódio - A Estrela de Irajá ===
- Arlindo Lopes - Passageiro
- Camila Pitanga - Suzete da Silva / Cherry Davis
- João Velho - Passageiro
- Mateus Solano - Toby Crane
- Selma Lopes - Vizinha

=== 36º Episódio - Super-Mamãe Suzete ===
- Ruth de Souza - Passageira
- Camila Pitanga - Suzete da Silva / Cherry Davis
- Sérgio Mastropasqua - Edgar
- Lafayette Galvão - Abílio
- Victor Pecoraro - Sérgio
- Bruno Vieira - Pedro
- Kate Lyra - Rita

=== 37º Episódio - Noel da Conceição ===
- Inez Viana - Passageira / Carmem Dorotéia
- Pedro Paulo Rangel - Noel Rosa da Conceição
- Miguel Oliveira - Jéferson
- Henrique Neves - Oscarzinho José
- Márcio Machado - Camile Kidman
