= Bruna Carvalho =

Brazilian actress

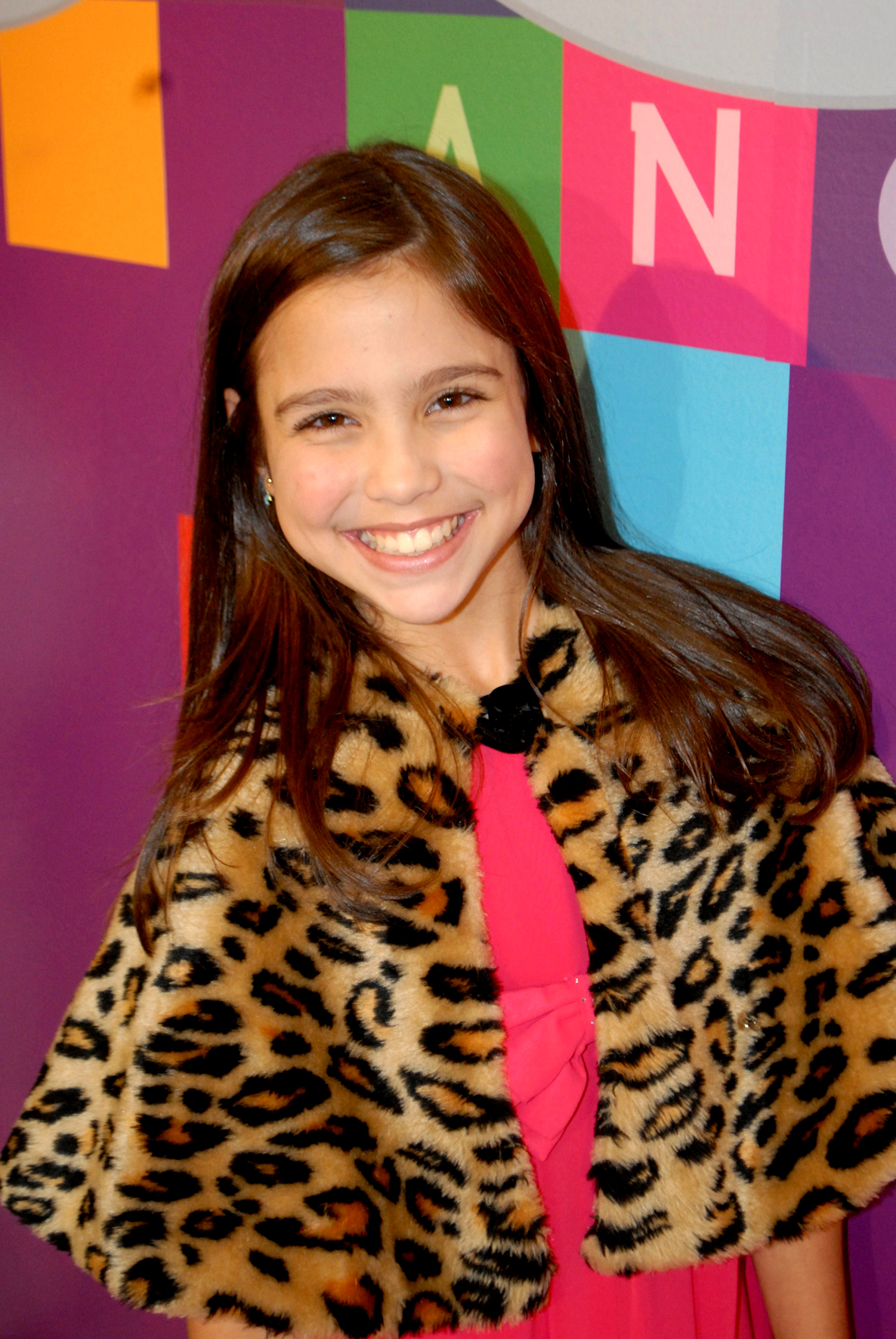
- Carvalho at the time of Carousel (2011).
- Born: Bruna Alves de Carvalho; April 16, 2000 (age 26); São Paulo, Brazil
- Occupation: Actress
- Years active: 2010–present
- Parent(s): Angelica Celina Fernandes and Sérgio Carvalho

Bruna Alves de Carvalho (born São Paulo, Brazil, April 16, 2000) is a Brazilian actress, the daughter of Angelica Celina Fernandes and Sérgio Carvalho. Following early appearances in commercials, her first major role was as Lara Fiel in the soap opera Amor e Revolution in 2011. She gained further prominence in 2012 playing Nina in the telenovela Carousel.

From 2013 through 2015, she appeared as Isabel in the remake of the children's soap opera Chiquititas, adapted by Iris Abravanel and aired by SBT. She has also appeared in the YouTube video series Rota (Route) 50 15, in which she and companion Rogério Enachev travel the world.

== Filmography ==
Television
Year	Title	Role
2011	Amor e Revolução	Lara de Oliveira Fiel
2012–2013	Carrossel	Nina
2013–2015	Chiquititas	Isabel "Bel" Ribeiro

=== Film ===
Year	Title	Role
2018	Querida Mamãe	Priscilla Queiroz
2021	A Menina que Matou os Pais	Rafaela
2021	O Menino que Matou Meus Pais	Rafaela

o maniaco do parque

=== Internet ===
Year	Title	Function	Notes
2019–2020	Dezesseis Brunas	Presenter	YouTube
