= Paleotti =

Paleotti is a surname. Notable people with the surname include:

- Gabriele Paleotti (1522–1597), Italian Roman Catholic cardinal
- Rodolfo Paleotti (died 1619), Italian Roman Catholic prelate

== See also ==
- Paoletti, another surname
