= Graziella Schmitt =

Brazilian actress (born 1981)

- Born: Graziella de Cássia Schmitt Silva; May 26, 1981 (age 43); Porto Alegre, Rio Grande do Sul, Brazil
- Occupation: Actress
- Years active: 1995–present

Graziella de Cássia Schmitt Silva, commonly known as Graziella Schmitt (born May 26, 1981), is a Brazilian actress. She played the lead role in the telenovela Amor e Revolução and as of 2013 plays the lead role in Belmonte.

== Career ==
Born in Porto Alegre, Rio Grande do Sul state, after working as a paquita (dancer) in Xuxa Park from 1995 to 2000, and in 2002 playing Laila in Sandy & Junior and presenting TV Globinho, she was cast as Vivi in Malhação in 2004. The character she played was the stereotypical popular girl in school. After guest starring in other programs such as Pé na Jaca in 2007 as Renatinha, Por Toda Minha Vida in 2008 and Mina, she played Tina Tinia in 2008 Rede Globo's telenovela A Favorita. Graziella Schmitt returned to Malhação in 2009, playing a different character, this time she played biology teacher Letícia. She plays the lead role in SBT's telenovela Amor e Revolução. The telenovela debuted on April 5, 2011, and she played Maria Paixão, who is the daughter of a communist journalist, and fights against the military dictatorship in Brazil. Her character falls in love to José Guerra, played by Cláudio Lins, who is the son of one of the soldiers involved in the 1964 coup d'état. Grazilella Schmitt stars as Paula in the 2013 Portuguese telenovela Belmonte.

== Filmography ==
=== Television ===
Telenovelas
Year	Title	Role	Notes	TV channel
1995–2000	Xuxa Park	Herself	Paquita	Rede Globo
2002	Sandy & Junior	Laila	Co-star	Rede Globo
2002	TV Globinho	Herself	Presenter	Rede Globo
2004–2005	Malhação	Viviane Reis (Vivi)	Co-star	Rede Globo
2007	Pé na Jaca	Renatinha	Special guest star	Rede Globo
2008	Por Toda Minha Vida	Mina	Special guest star	Rede Globo
2008	A Favorita	Tina Tinia	Co-star	Rede Globo
2009	Malhação ID	Letícia dos Santos	Co-star	Rede Globo
2011	Amor e Revolução	Maria Paixão	Lead role	SBT
2013	Belmonte	Paula	Lead role	TVI

=== Cinema ===
Cinema
Year	Title	Role
1999	Xuxa Requebra	Student
2007	Docu-Drama	Call girl
2009	Teus Olhos Meus	Lígia
2009	Flordelis - Basta uma Palavra para Mudar	

=== Theater ===
Theater
Play	Director
A Exceção e a Regra	by Bertold Brecht, directed by Alexandre Mello
Gotham City	directed by Sérgio Penna
Beijos de Verão	by Domingos de Oliveira, directed by Eduardo Wotzik
Electra (Note: There are several plays titled Electra, and it is unclear which this one was.)	directed by Antônio Guedes
Rapunzel	directed by Walcyr Carrasco
Limpe todo Sangue Antes que Manche o Carpete	Vinícius Arneiro de Jô Bilac
Confronto	by Domingos Oliveira, Márcia Zanelatto, Luiz Eduardo Soares
Senhorita Júlia	by August Strindberg, directed by Ole Erdmann
