= Lara Rodrigues =

Brazilian actress (born 1990)

- Born: 22 December 1990 (age 35); Juiz de Fora, Minas Gerais, Brazil
- Occupation: actress
- Years active: 2001–present

Lara Jobim Matos Rodrigues (born 22 December 1990) is a Brazilian actress known for her portrayal as Narizinho from Sítio do Picapau Amarelo between 2001 and 2003. In 2011 she appeared on TV in O Astro.

== Filmography ==
=== Television ===
Year	Title	Role
2001–2003	Sítio do Picapau Amarelo	Narizinho
2004	Malhação	Camila Costa Soares
2005	Clara e o Chuveiro do Tempo	Bárbara
2006	Sítio do Picapau Amarelo	Samira Turco
2007	Eterna Magia	Teca (Tereza Ferreira O'Neill)
2009/2010	Ger@l.com	Michele

=== Films ===
Year	Title	Role
2006	Se Eu Fosse Você	Bia (Beatriz)
2012	Insônia	
