= Leila Lopes (actress) =

Actress, journalist and television presenter (1959–2009)

- Born: Leila Lopes Gomes; 19 November 1959; São Leopoldo, Rio Grande do Sul, Brazil
- Died: 3 December 2009 (aged 50); São Paulo, Brazil
- Occupations: Actress; journalist; television presenter
- Years active: 1990–2009

Leila Lopes (19 November 1959 – 3 December 2009) was a Brazilian actress, journalist and television presenter, known for her appearance in TV Globo telenovelas and later for entering the pornographic film industry.

== Early life ==
Born Leila Gomes Lopes in São Leopoldo, Rio Grande do Sul, Brazil, she was the daughter of Reúcio Lopes, a teacher from Esteio, and Natália Gomes Lopes. She lived in Esteio with her parents until she became famous in 1990 when she became a journalist for the television channel Rede Globo.

She appeared twice in the Brazilian issue of Playboy magazine, in March 1997 and May 2008, after appearing in a pornographic film for the Brasileirinhas studio. Her last work had been as a presenter of the television program, Entre 4 Paredes com Leila Lopes. She also appeared on JustTV, Calcinha Justa, and Sexprivé.

== Death ==
Lopes was found dead in her apartment in Morumbi, São Paulo, in the early hours of 3 December 2009. It was subsequently confirmed that she had committed suicide by ingesting rat poison. She was buried in the family vault, at Dois de Novembro Cemetery, in Esteio, Rio Grande do Sul.

== Filmography ==
=== Telenovelas ===
- 1990: Pantanal as Lúcia
- 1991: O Guarani as Severina
- 1992: Despedida de Solteiro as Carol
- 1993: Renascer as Teacher Lu
- 1994: Tropicaliente as Olívia María
- 1996: O Rei do Gado as Suzane
- 1997: Malhação as Rosa
- 1998: Caça Talentos as Rosinha
- 1999: Chiquititas as Mãe de Vivi
- 2000: Marcas da Paixão as Creuza

=== Pornographic films ===
- 2008: Pecado sem Perdão as Marlene
- 2009: Pecados and Tentações as Marlene
- 2009: Pecado Final as Marlene
- 2009: A Última Enterrada

== Theatre ==
- 1994: Quero Voltar Pra Casa
- 1995: Entre Amigas
- 1995: Frankestein
- 1996: Socorro, Mamãe foi Embora
- 1997: A Beata Maria do Egito
- 1998: Paixão de Cristo
- 1998: Pedro Mico
- 1999: Terapia Sexual
- 2002: Em Nome do Filho
- 2002: Diva
- 2003: Despedida Muito Louca
- 2004: Nunca Se Sábado
- 2005: Em Nome do Pai
