= Simulator (disambiguation) =

A simulator is something that produces an imitative representation of a process or system that could exist in the real world.

Simulator may also refer to:

- Flight simulator, a working mockup of an aircraft cockpit, automated to give an approximation of the experience of flying the plane
  - Combat flight simulation game, a video game that simulates military aircraft in combat
- Driving simulator, a simulator of the driving of cars and other ground vehicles
- Motion simulator an amusement ride system paired with a ride film, commonly used for entertainment in theme parks
- Quantum simulator, a simulator of quantum systems
- Simulation video game, any of a class of video games that aims to simulate something else, such as a billiards table, pinball machine, or (see above) aircraft flight controls
- Simulator ride, an amusement ride in which an audience watches a film while the ride's movement and practical effects produce an immersive environment
- Space simulator, a system that simulates an environment in outer space
- Train simulator, a railway simulator used for training or amusement

== See also ==
- Simulation (disambiguation)
- Simulator sickness
