= A Mulher Invisível =

Brazilian television series

- Created by: Guel Arraes; Cláudio Torres
- Starring: Selton Mello; Luana Piovani; Débora Falabella; Álamo Facó; Deborah Wood
- Country of origin: Brazil
- Original language: Portuguese
- No. of seasons: 2
- No. of episodes: 13

Original release
- Network: Rede Globo
- Release: May 31, 2011 - December 20, 2011

A Mulher Invisível (The Invisible Woman) is a weekly Brazilian Emmy-winning comedy TV series produced by Rede Globo; it is a spin-off from the film of the same name. It stars Selton Mello, Débora Falabella and Luana Piovani. Its first episode aired on May 31, 2011.

== Premise ==
Pedro (Selton Mello) is a young man, recently married to Clarisse (Débora Falabella), whom he sincerely loves. Pedro is a successful publicist with a promising career, and Clarisse happens to be his boss. But apparently that's not enough, for Pedro has an imaginary paramour, Amanda (Luana Piovani), a beautiful and sensuous blonde woman whom of course only he can see. Amanda is an ideal woman, in love with Pedro. As she herself states, she exists only to make him happy. Pedro's coworker and best friend Wilson, a cynical lover yet loyal friend, is, as the series begins, the only one to know Pedro's secret.

In the pilot episode, Clarisse, after a crisis, is up to divorce Pedro and discovers his imaginary love. She at first thinks he has gone insane, but realizes that the love he feels for Amanda is the love he should feel for her, and so, in a strange way, that proves he still loves her. She forgives Pedro and is reconciled with him, after he promises "to send Amanda away".

In the end of that episode, though, we discover Amanda has not gone away definitively, and, as the second episode open, we know Pedro lied to Clarisse and Amanda is still there. Clarisse, angry and hurt, after quarreling a lot with Pedro, says she wants equal rights and will have a paramour too. When her idea of getting a lover to arise jealousy in Pedro doesn't work, and he exposes her farce, she suddenly pretends she has an imaginary lover too. Suffering, Pedro offers to send Amanda away, forever this time, if Clarisse stops that.

However, the couple's life without Amanda reveals itself to be unhappy, and Clarisse, realizing Amanda was indeed the flame and joy of their relationship (as Pedro once said), makes Pedro want to obtain Amanda's forgiveness. She allows him to call back the image he sent away.

== Style and influence ==
The series mixes humor, eroticism and love-drama. It is a retelling of the myth of Pygmalion, where men and women search for ideal lovers.

== Reception ==
The series was well received. Two seasons were produced.

== Awards ==
A Mulher Invisível was named as Best Comedy at the 2012 International Emmy Awards.
