= Marisol Ribeiro =

Brazilian actress

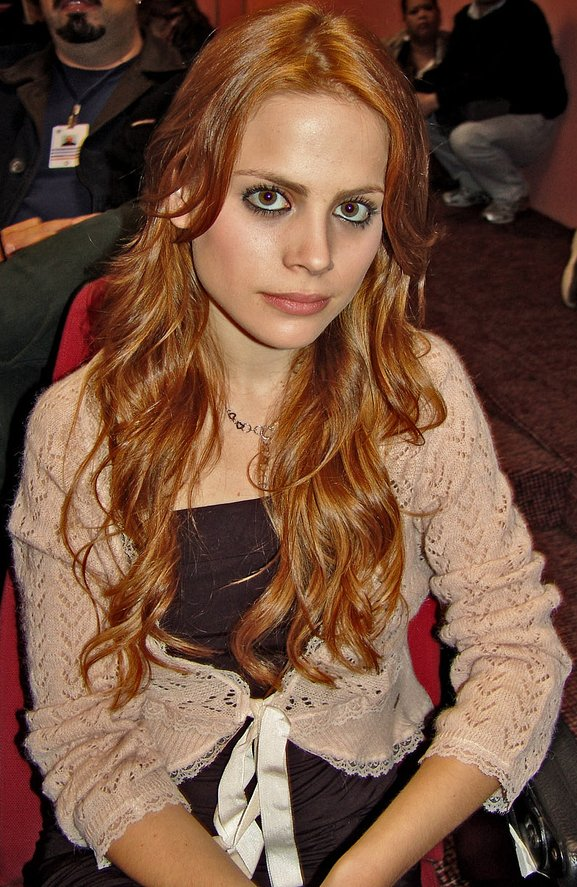
- Marisol Ribeiro at the launch of the novel Cristal.
- Born: Marisol Ribeiro Ferreira; July 19, 1984 (age 42); São Paulo, Brazil
- Occupation: Actress
- Spouse: João Lavras (m. 2008; div. 2014)
- Website: www.marisolribeiro.com.br

Marisol Ribeiro Ferreira (born July 19, 1984) is a Brazilian actress.

== Biography ==
Marisol Ribeiro Ferreira was born on July 19, 1984, in São Paulo to actress Maria Ferreira and former television news presenter Gilberto Ribeiro. She lived in Taubaté, São Paulo.

In 1999 she moved to the capital to pursue her acting career. She appeared in TV commercials and soap operas. In 2001 she joined the cast of Disney Cruj in SBT, and the following year Marisol of the same station and appeared as Tininha in Malhação on Rede Globo. In 2006, she played Manuela in Malhação.

In 2005 she posed nude for the magazine Sexy. The following year, after leaving Rede Globo, Marisol accused the broadcaster for not giving her work as a result of having posed nude.

== Filmography ==
=== Television ===
Year	Title	Role	Notes
2001	Disney Cruj	Maya da Silva	
2002	Marisol	Alessandra Figueiredo	
2002	Malhação	Tininha	Season 9; Episode: "December 2, 2002"
2005	América	Kerry Villa Nova	
2006	Cristal	Marión Bandeira de Carvalho	
2007	Sete Pecados	Eliete Gasparini	
2008	Água na Boca	Érika Fagundes	
2011	Morde & Assopra	Melissa	
2013	Contos do Edgar	friend of Cecília	Episode: "Cecília"
2014	Meus Dias de Rock	Martha	
2015	O Hipnotizador	Carolina	Episodes: "A Fita Amarela" / "O Colecionador de Dias"
2016	Os Dez Mandamentos	Achsah	Episodes: "July 2–4, 2016"
2016	A Terra Prometida	Achsah	
2017	Prata da Casa	Sabrina	Episode: "In Cannabis Veritas"

=== Films ===
Year	Title	Role	Notes
2009	Areia do Tempo	Madalena	Short film
2010	Azul Marinho Preto e Branco	Mika	Short film
2010	Inversão	Juliana	
2011	VIPs	Lica	
2011	Família Vende Tudo	Lindinha	
2012	Entre Nós	Nurse	Short film
2013	O Lado de Fora	Leelo	
2014	Obra		
2014	Apneia	Chris	
2015	Até que a Casa Caia	Leila	
2016	Entre Idas e Vindas	Angela	
2016	Malícia	Camila	
2017	Cromossomo 21		

=== Theater ===
Year	Title	Role	Ref.
1999	O Despertar da Primavera	Wendla	
2006	Ariela fora do Mar	Ariela	
2011	A Megera Domada	Catarina	
2012	Música para Cortar os Pulsos	Isabela	
2012	Mulheres Alteradas	Alice	
2014	No Quarto ao Lado – O Espetáculo do Vibrador	Catherine Givings	
