= Família Vende Tudo =

2011 film directed by Alain Fresnot

- Theatrical release poster
- Directed by: Alain Fresnot
- Written by: Alain Fresnot; Marcus Aurelius Pimenta
- Produced by: Wellington Pingo
- Starring: Caco Ciocler; Marisol Ribeiro; Luana Piovani
- Cinematography: José Roberto Eliezer
- Edited by: José Carone Júnior; Mariana Fresnot
- Music by: Felipe Pipo Grytz
- Production company: A.F. Cinema
- Distributed by: PlayArte Pictures
- Release date: September 30, 2011
- Running time: 90 minutes
- Country: Brazil
- Language: Portuguese
- Budget: R$5 million
- Box office: R$1,009,124

Família Vende Tudo is a 2011 Brazilian film directed by Alain Fresnot.

== Premise ==
A family with financial difficulties has an idea: to make daughter Lindinha (Marisol Ribeiro) impregnate the famous singer Ivan Cláudio (Caco Ciocler), the king of Xique. However, Ivan's wife, Jennifer (Luana Piovani), is suspicious of this.

== Cast ==
- Marisol Ribeiro as Lindinha
- Caco Ciocler as Ivan Cláudio
- Luana Piovani as Jennifer
- Lima Duarte as Ariclenes
- Imara Reis as Eunice
- Ailton Graça
- Vera Holtz
- Marisa Orth
- Robson Nunes
- Latino as Choreographer
