= Luana Piovani =

Brazilian actress and former model (born 1976)

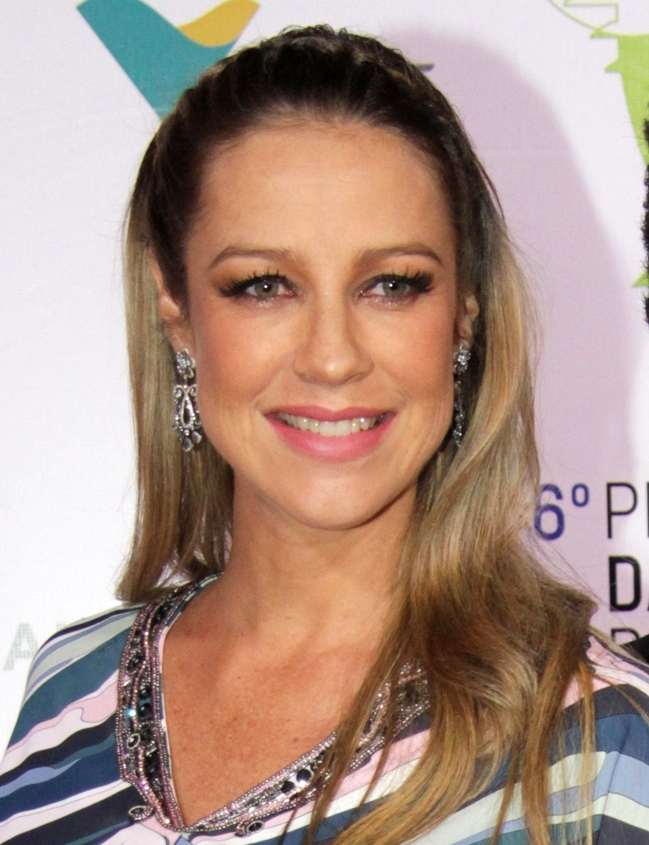
- Piovani in 2015
- Born: Luana Elídia Afonso Piovani; 29 August 1976 (age 50); São Paulo, Brazil
- Citizenship: Brazilian; Italian
- Occupation: Actress
- Years active: 1990–present
- Height: 1.78 m (5 ft 10 in)
- Spouse: Pedro Scooby (m. 2013; div. 2019)
- Children: 3

Luana Elídia Afonso Piovani (Portuguese pronunciation: [luˈɐnɐ eˈlidʒaˈfõsu pioˈvɐni], born 29 August 1976) is a Brazilian actress, TV host, and former model.

== Career ==
Piovani started her career as a Ford Models Agency model in 1990 and a year later spent some time working in Japan.

Piovani's first television appearance was in the 1992 miniseries Sex Appeal, on Rede Globo. She also had a role in the Você Decide series. Her first soap opera role was in 1994's Quatro por Quatro. She appeared in the Luis Ferré's film Super Colosso and made a special appearance in the A Comédia da Vida Privada series. Her first theater play was Nó de Gravata, in 1996.

In 1997, she was voted the sexiest woman on earth by Editora Abril's VIP magazine. In the same year, she starred in Malhação. She also appeared in D'Artagnan e os Três Mosqueteiros, Sai de Baixo, Mulher, Os Normais and Sítio do Picapau Amarelo.

In 1999, she produced and starred in A.M.I.G.A.S. in the theater. In addition, she hosted the show Tudo de Bom, at MTV Brasil and The Video Music Awards of that year. She also starred in the long-running children's play Alice in Wonderland. She also joined the cast of Saia Justa, from GNT (Globosat), along with the co-hostesses Betty Lago (actress), Márcia Tiburi (philosopher) and Monica Waldvogel (journalist).

In 2002, Luana made an appearance at Fashion Rio, the biggest fashion event in Latin America, following São Paulo Fashion Week, earning some notoriety when she catwalked absolutely naked above the waist, holding her breasts.

In 2006, stepping aside from her pin-up image, Luana took a chance in children's theater, producing and starring in the leading role in Antoine de Saint-Exupéry's O Pequeno Príncipe. The play was a hit with children.

In 2009, she starred in the movie A Mulher Invisível. She also made a cameo in the series Ó Paí, Ó.

In 2010, she was one of the protagonists of the series In the Na Forma da Lei, where she played the delegate Gabriela. Currently, the show enacts O Soldadinho e a Bailarina. Inspired by the classic children's literature, The Steadfast Tin Soldier, by Hans Christian Andersen, the musical is the third foray into playwriting by Luana Piovani for children. In the same year she appeared in the film Eu Odeio o Orkut.

Luana says that she agreed to return the video because it was an invitation by her friend Wolf Maya, who says she is much admired and who claims to have an enormous affection. The text is signed by Antônio Calmon, who also wrote the miniseries Sex Appeal, which catapulted to fame. The former model also said that the novel does not intend to anytime soon.

Luana has a personal website and a weblog, where she shares her views of life with her online fans. She returned to the cinema in 2012 with the film As Aventuras de Agamenon, o Repórter.

In 2014, Luana was listed for the show Dupla Identidade, Glória Perez, where she played Vera in the police.

== Personal life ==
Piovani has dated entrepreneurs João Paulo Diniz, Ricardo Mansur and Christiano Rangel, actors Guilherme Fontes, Rodrigo Santoro, Marcos Palmeira, Dado Dolabella and Paulo Vilhena, the model Caco Ricci, and businessman Felipe Simão.

In 2011, she became pregnant with her first child, the fruit of her relationship with the surfer Pedro Scooby. Dom was born on March 26, 2012. On July 26, 2013, Piovani married Scooby in a private ceremony, in front of 275 guests. She now has three children: Dom, Bem and Liz. She is São Paulo FC fan.

== Controversies ==
Luana was involved in controversy, as already stated that she smoked marijuana and even got involved in fights with Dado Dolabella in October 2008.

In August 2011, Luana was angry for having appeared in the Profissão Repórter, TV show by Caco Barcellos on the Globo, which addressed the theme of life photographer. The actress refused an interview with one of the journalists of the show and went to his Twitter to complain about the place.

== Filmography ==
=== Television ===
Year	Title	Role	Notes
1993	Sex Appeal	Angel Sousa Borges	
1994	Quatro por Quatro	Duda (Maria Eduarda Bastos)	
1996	Vira-Lata	Wânia	
1996	A Comédia da Vida Privada		Episode: "Parece Que Foi Ontem"
1996	A Vida Como Ela É	Patrícia	Episode: "A Profissional"
1997	A Comédia da Vida Privada		Episode: "O Que Você Vai Ser Quando Crescer?"
1997	Malhação	Patrícia	
1998	Sai de Baixo	Penélope	Episode: "Caiu na Internet é Peixe"
1998	Labirinto	Virgínia Camargo	
1999	Suave Veneno	Márcia Eduarda Cerqueira	
1999	Mundo VIP	Herself	Cameo
1999	D'Artagnan e os Três Mosqueteiros		Cameo
1999	Mulher		Cameo
2000	Você Decide	Ariana	Episode: "A Bola da Vez"
2000	Tudo de Bom	Herself	Presenter
2002	O Quinto dos Infernos	Domitila de Castro Canto e Melo	
2002	Os Normais	Mainá	Episode: "Confusões São Normais"
2003	Homem Objeto		Cameo
2003	Sítio do Picapau Amarelo	Morgana	Cameo
2004	Celebridade	Herself	Cameo
2004	Casseta & Planeta, Urgente!	Various characters	Cameo
2004	Correndo Atrás	Érica Lobato	Special End of Year
2005	Saia Justa	Herself	TV Host
2006	Os Sete Pecados Capitais, Preguiça		Cameo
2006	Lu	Lu / Luciane / Lurdes / Lucimara	Special End of Year
2007	Casseta & Planeta, Urgente!	Herself	Cameo
2008	Dicas de Um Sedutor	Kate	Episode: "Embarangada"
2008	Guerra & Paz	Laura Toscano	Episode: "Macho & Fêmea"
2008	Faça Sua História	Sandra Sandrelli	Episodes: "Cinema Novíssimo", "O Feitiço da Cueca"
2009	Ó Paí, Ó	Patrícia	Episode: "Preto no Branco"
2010	Na Forma da Lei	Gabriela Guerreiro	
2011	A Mulher Invisível	Amanda	
2011	Superbonita	Herself	TV host
2012	Guerra dos Sexos	Wânia Trabuco	
2013	Dança dos Famosos 10	Herself	Reality show of Domingão do Faustão
2014	Amor Veríssimo	Amanda	Cameo
2014	Dupla Identidade	Vera Müller	
2014	A Grande Família	Lurdinha	Cameo
2016	Vai Que Cola	Maria Auxiliadora (Daphne Mansur)	Episode: "Méier Fashion Week"
2018	Luana é de Lua	Herself	TV host
2022	Sangue Oculto	Vanda Corte Real	

=== Film ===
Year	Title	Role
1995	Super-Colosso: a Gincana da TV Colosso	Alice
2003	O Homem Que Copiava	Marinês
2005	O Casamento de Romeu e Julieta	Julieta
2006	Zuzu Angel	Elke Maravilha
2006	Seus Problemas Acabaram	
2009	A Mulher Invisível	Amanda
2011	Eu Odeio o Orkut	
2011	Família Vende Tudo	Jennifer
2012	Agamenon: The Film	Isaura
2012	Insônia	
2014	A Noite da Virada	Rosa
2015	Vai Que Cola - O Filme	Herself

== Podcasts ==
Year	Title	Role	Notes
2024–presente	Não Me Gastem	Co-host	with Magda Burity
2025	Loveless Story	Narrator	
2026	Nem te Conto	host	

== Theater ==
Year	Title	Role
1996	Nó de Gravata	
1998	D'Artagnan e os Três Mosqueteiros	Milady
1999	A.M.I.G.A.S.	
2002	Mais uma Vez Amor	
2003	Alice no País das Maravilhas	Alice
2006	O Pequeno Príncipe	Pequeno Príncipe
2008	Pássaro da Noite	Ela
2013	Sonhos de um Sedutor	Linda
2017	E Se Eu Não te Amar Amanhã?	Samantha / Suellen
