= Filipe Duarte (actor) =

Portuguese actor (1973–2020)

- Born: Luís Filipe Duarte Ferreira da Silva; 5 June 1973; Nova Lisbon, Angola
- Died: 17 April 2020 (aged 46); Lisbon, Portugal
- Education: Lisbon Theatre and Film School
- Occupation: Actor
- Years active: 1997–2020
- Spouse: Nuria Mencía
- Children: 1

Luís Filipe Duarte Ferreira da Silva, popularly known as Filipe Duarte (5 June 1973 – 17 April 2020), was an Angolan-born Portuguese actor. He is best known for the roles in the films Variações: Guardian Angel, Cinzento e Negro and Noise.

== Personal life and death ==
He was born on 5 June 1973 in Nova Lisboa, then in the Portuguese overseas territory of Angola. He was married to a Spanish actress, Nuria Mencía. The couple has one daughter, Antonia who was born in March 2011.

Duarte died on 17 April 2020, during the first COVID-19 lockdown in Portugal, at the age of 46 due to an acute myocardial infarction.

== Career ==
Duarte completed a drama course on theater at the Lisbon Theatre and Film School. Then he completed the actor training course at the Institute for Research and Theatrical Creation. He started his acting career with several stage plays under the renowned theater directors Adolfo Gutkin, Rogério de Carvalho, Geraldo Touché, Francisco Salgado, Carlos J. Pessoa, Laila Ripol and Miguel Seabra.

On the television screen, he acted in the telefilm Teorema de Pitágoras, directed by Gonçalo Galvão Telles. Then he joined the two TV serials A Ferreirinha, directed by Jorge Paixão da Costa and João Semana, by João Cayatte. When he became a popular actor with the serials, he played the leading role in the series Ecuador which was based on the novel by Miguel Sousa Tavares. In 2013, he played the popular role 'João Belmonte' in the television soapie Belmonte.

Meanwhile, Filipe made regular voice-overs for cartoons and animated films including the famous character 'Sanosuke Sagara' in the animated series Samurai X.

At the time of his death in 2020, he was recording the Brazilian soap opera Amor de Mãe, showing on SIC, joined the cast of the film Nothing Ever Happened directed by Gonçalo Galvão Teles.

== Filmography ==
Year	Film	Role	Genre	Ref.
1997	13º Buraco		Short film	
1999	Jardim da Celeste		TV series	
1999	À Deriva	Luís	Short film	
2001	A Febre do Ouro Negro	Xico Perigoso	TV mini-series	
2001	Teorema de Pitágoras	Henrique	TV movie	
2001	Bastidores	Afonso	TV series	
2002	Sociedade Anónima		TV series	
2002	Fúria de Viver	Pedro Lacerda	TV series	
2003	Just by Chance	Carlos	TV series	
2003	Cacto	Fred	Short film	
2003	Os Imortais	Abel Cavaco	Film	
2004	The Miracle According to Salomé	Tenente Brás	Film	
2004	The Murmuring Coast	Luis	Film	
2004	A Ferreirinha	António Bernardo	TV series	
2004	Confissões de 2 Deputados		Short film	
2005	Um Tiro no Escuro	Engenheiro	Film	
2005	João Semana	Zé do Telhado	TV series	
2005	Uma Noite ao Acaso		Short film	
2005	Um Amor Próprio	Passenger	Short film	
2006	Estranho	Husband	TV series	
2006	Blood Curse	Luis	Film	
2006	Fatal	Batarda	Short film	
2006	Os Caminheiros		Short film	
2007	Antes de Amanhã		Short film	
2007	A Outra Margem	Ricardo	Film	
2008	Nuit de chien	Júlio	Film	
2008	Noise	Paulo	Film	
2008	Castelos no Ar	Júlio	Short film	
2008	4 Copas	Miguel	Film	
2008	Equador	Luís Bernardo Valença	TV mini-series	
2010	Voodoo		Short film	
2010	Senhor X		Short film	
2011	Redenção		Short film	
2011	O Legado do Pai		Short film	
2011	Casa c/ Piscina		Short film	
2011	Zoo		Short film	
2011	Barcelona, Neutral City	Pedro	TV series	
2011	Tejo	Inspector	Short film	
2011	A Primeira Ceia	António	Short film	
2012	Imagine	Stranger	Film	
2012	Pháon		Short film	
2013	A Ceia	Paulo	Short film	
2013	The Invisible Life	Hugo	Film	
2013	Belmonte	João Belmonte	TV series	
2014	The Time in Between	Da Silva	TV series	
2014	O Pesadelo de João		Short film	
2015	Dinis e Isabel	D. Dinis	Short film	
2015	Cinzento e Negro	Lucas Oliveira e Silva	Film	
2015	O Assalto	Assaltante	Short film	
2015	Tales from the Circus	Pepe	Short film	
2016	Terapia	Jorge Velez	TV series	
2016	Histórias de Alice	Olavo	Film	
2016	The Death of Louis XIV	Noble	Film	
2016	Os Boys	César	TV series	
2017	Traça: Mar Deserto		Short film	
2018	El accidente	Paul Bresson	TV series	
2018	La otra mirada	Vanildo "Nildo" Zacarías de Azevedo	TV series	
2019	Matadero	Vasco	TV series	
2019	Variações	Fernando Ataíde	Film	
2020	Mosquito	Tenente do Posto	Film	
2020	Amor de Mãe	Gabo	TV series	
2020	Nothing Ever Happened	Jorge	Film	

== Dubbing ==
- Freakazoid! - Freakazoid
- Rurouni Kenshin - Sagara Sanosuke
- Shrek - Lord Farquaad
- Superman: The Animated Series - Brainiac
- Tarzan - Tarzan
