= Casa dos Artistas =

Casa dos Artistas (lit. "House of Artists") is a Brazilian reality show that was broadcast by SBT. Similar to Big Brother and hosted by Silvio Santos, the series followed a group Brazilian celebrities living together in a specialised house, isolated from the outside world.

The series was developed by SBT after it declined an offer to license Big Brother; competing network Rede Globo (which had acquired the rights to the format, and would go on to premiere Big Brother Brasil to capitalize on the success of Casa) and Big Brother rightsholder Endemol would successfully sue SBT over the series.

== History ==
In 2000, Endemol offered SBT owner Grupo Silvio Santos the rights to produce a local version of the Dutch reality series Big Brother, but the network declined due to its cost. The rights would later be acquired by Rede Globo: the network originally intended to hold the rights as a defensive measure only, and did not actually plan to produce a Brazilian version of Big Brother.

Upon declining the offer, SBT signed an agreement with Endemol agreeing not to use proprietary information surrounding the Big Brother format that had been provided to them during the negotiation process. Nevertheless, SBT began to develop its own, similar series, which would feature celebrities as contestants. The series was developed in secret, with only network owner and president Silvio Santos and several other SBT executives aware of its existence, and the cast of celebrity contestants required to sign non-disclosure agreements during filming. In October 2001, SBT began airing promos teasing a new series that would premiere on 28 October, without revealing its title; on the premiere date, the series was revealed to be Casa dos Artistas. The series premiere was scheduled against Globo's long-running Sunday-evening news magazine Fantástico, notably beating it 35 to 25 in average ratings points.

Globo obtained an injunction halting the broadcast of the first season for two days, accusing it of having plagiarized Big Brother. The program was allowed to continue airing afterward. The success of Casa dos Artistas motivated Globo to go on with a Brazilian version of Big Brother, with the first season of Big Brother Brasil airing over the summer in January 2002; Globo would contrast the program's premise over Casa by emphasizing its largely-civilian cast rather than celebrities. In 2015, the Superior Court of Justice ruled in favour of Rede Globo and Endemol, ordering SBT to pay R$18 million.

== Season details ==
=== Season 1 ===
The first season of Casa dos Artistas was broadcast from 28 October 2001 to 16 December 2001—the shortest season of the series. The new series proved to be competitive in the ratings against Globo's telenovela O Clone. The season finale set a ratings record for SBT, with an average 47 points and peaking at 55—its largest audience since the 1995 Copa do Brasil final. Globo attempted to counterprogram the finale by scheduling major segments on Fantástico (including features on Roberto Carlos' new acoustic album, Sandy & Junior, and the upcoming finale of its own reality show No Limite 3), but only managed 18 ratings points.

Name	Age	Occupation	Result
Bárbara Paz	27	Actress	Winner
Supla	35	Singer	Runner-up
Mari Alexandre	27	Model	Third place
Patrícia Coelho	29	Singer	8th eliminated
Alexandre Frota	38	Actor	7th eliminated
Mateus Carrieri	34	Actor	6th eliminated
Taiguara Nazareth	25	Actor	5th eliminated
Nana Gouvêa	26	Actress	4th eliminated
Núbia Oliver	27	Actor	3rd eliminated
Marco Mastronelli	33	Actor	2nd eliminated
Leandro Lehart	29	Singer	Withdrew
Alessandra Iscatena	26	Production assistant	1st eliminated

=== Season 3 ===
The third season ran from 2 June 2002 to 28 July 2002. This season featured a theme of six celebrity contestants each inviting one of their fans to join them in the cast; the season was won by Sérgio Paiva, a fan of Solange Frazão.

=== Season 4 ===
The fourth and final season ran from 15 August 2004 to 17 October 2004; the series was retooled as a talent search, with the house becoming a drama school, and the contestants being aspiring actors competing to win a role in an upcoming SBT telenovela.

With ratings continuing to decline, SBT cancelled the series in favour of Ídolos.

== See also ==
- Celebrity Big Brother
