= Carla Marins =

Brazilian actress (born 1968)

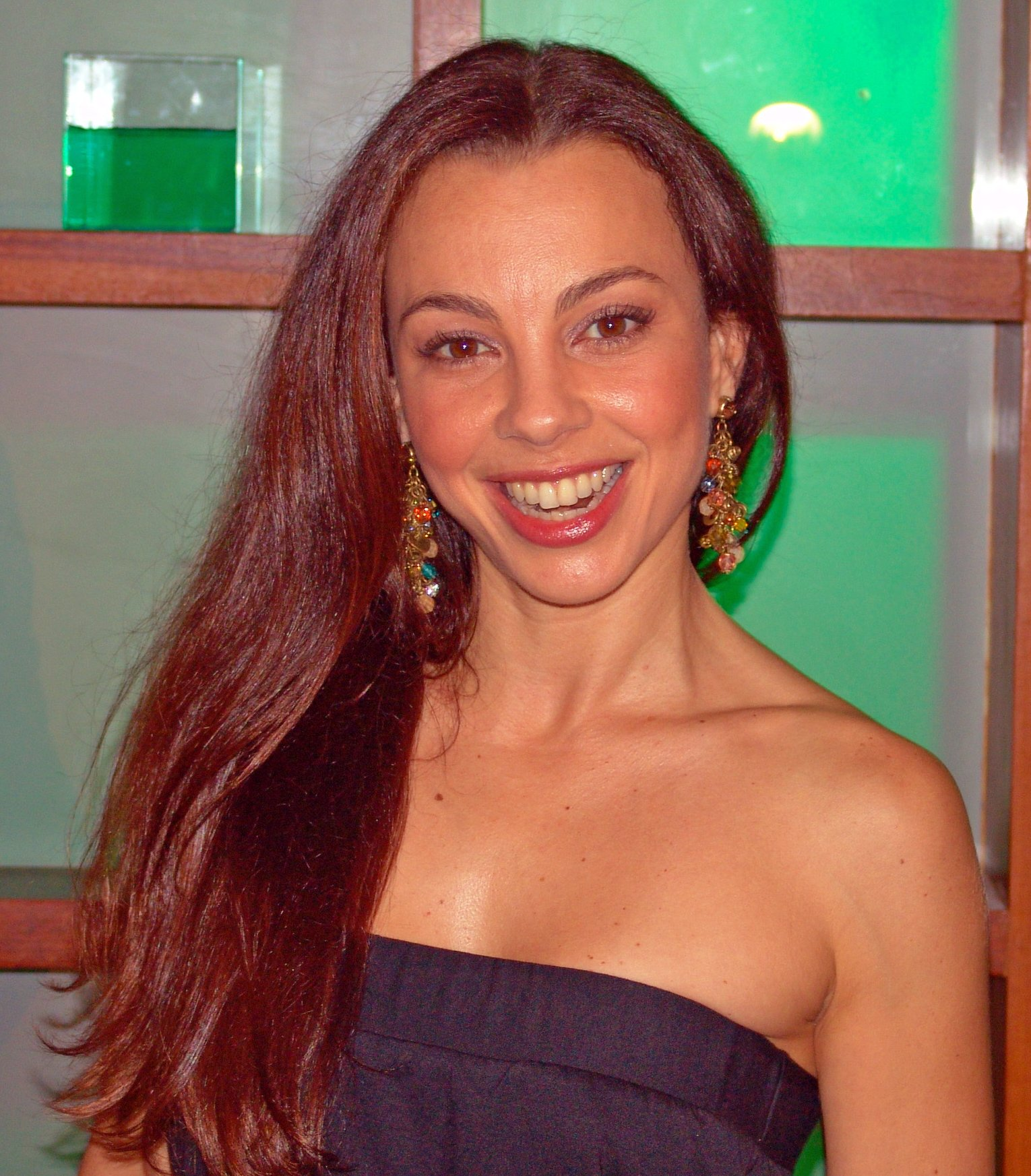
- Marins in 2006
- Born: Carla Cristina Marins; 7 June 1968 (age 57); Campos dos Goytacazes, Rio de Janeiro, Brazil
- Occupation: Actress
- Years active: 1985–present
- Spouse: Hugo Baltazar (m. 2006)
- Children: 1

Carla Cristina Marins (born 7 June 1968) is a Brazilian actress.

== Career ==
It was at school that she discovered her calling. Marins, since childhood kept saying she wanted to be a pediatrician, but she would really love to act. She realized that at age 14 when she was chosen to do the lead role of The Ox and the Donkey to Bethlehem, by Maria Clara Machado. After that, Carla Marins decided she wanted to be an actress.

At 16, with the support of her parents, Marins started investing in career and made several tests to commercial. Her first job was an advertisement for McDonald's. Made the film for TV and radio voiceover. At the same time, she began to attend drama schools and learned that the Globo was in need of youth to participate in the novel Hipertensão. How did the course with the interpretation of Wolf Maya, he invited her to join the test and passed. She posed nude at 24 years for the anniversary edition of Playboy magazine in 1992.

Marins participated in telenovelas like Bambolê, Pedra sobre Pedra, Tropicaliente, História de Amor, A Indomada, Porto dos Milagres, among other.

In 2002 and 2008, Marins appeared in episodes of A Grande Família, Sítio do Picapau Amarelo and show Faça Sua História.

In 2010 she starred in the telenovela Uma Rosa com Amor. Inspired by the story of Vicente Sesso - appears in the Globe of October 18, 1972 and July 3, 1973, the new version which aired on SBT was written by Tiago Santiago in collaboration with Renata Dias Gomes and directed by Del Rangel.

In 2011, she returned to Globo, where she played the nurse in the telenovela Amanda Morde & Assopra. In 2017, the actress signs with RecordTV to make the novel Apocalipse.

== Personal life ==
Marins is married to Hugo Baltazar, her personal trainer since 2006, who has a son Leon. Marins is associated with the Movimento Humanos Direitos.

== Filmography ==
=== Television ===
Year	Title	Role	Notes
1986	Hipertensão	Carola	
1987	Bambolê	Cristina Galhardo	
1988	Bebê a Bordo	Maria Luísa (Sininho)	
1989	O Sexo dos Anjos	Gigi	
1990	Delegacia de Mulheres	Alice	Episode: "Acima de Qualquer Suspeita"
1990	A, E, I, O... Urca	Suzy Lee	
1990	Araponga	Arlete	
1992	Pedra sobre Pedra	Eliane	
1993	O Mapa da Mina	Elisa Souto	
1993	Caso Especial	Rosa	Episode: "O Besouro e a Rosa"
1994	Tropicaliente	Dalila	
1995	História de Amor	Joyce Assunção	
1997	A Indomada	Dinorah Fernandes	
1997	A Comédia da Vida Privada	Laurinha	Episode: "Papai Foi à Lua"
1998	Mulher	Fernanda	Episode: "Prazeres e Limites"
1998	Você Decide	Andréa	Episode: "A Neta"
1999	Você Decide		Episode: "Assunto de Família"
1999	O Belo e as Feras	Júlia	Episode: "Dinheiro Só Traz Felicidade"
1999	Vila Madalena	Nancy Xavier	
2000	Brava Gente	Estefânia	Episode: "O Casamento Enganoso"
2001	Porto dos Milagres	Judite dos Reis	
2002	A Grande Família	Rosemary	Episode: "Vai Ser Tuco na Vida"
2002	Retrato Falado		Special of the Fantástico
2003	Sítio do Picapau Amarelo	Headless Mule / Berta	Episode: "O Primo do Carijó"
2003	Kubanacan	Oleana	Special participation
2006	Bang Bang	Alba	Special participation
2006	A Grande Família	Cida	Episode: "O Ovo da Serpente"
2006	Pé na Jaca	Isadora Cabedelo Haddad (Dorinha)	
2006	Papai Noel Existe	daughter of Jonas	Television special
2008	Faça Sua História	Adalgisa (Gigi)	
2010	Uma Rosa com Amor	Serafina Rosa Petrone	
2011	Morde & Assopra	Amanda Goulart	
2012	Malhação: Intensa como a Vida	Alice Miranda	Season 20
2013	As Canalhas	Sister Angélica	Episode: "Irmã Angélica"
2015	Os Homens São de Marte...	Joana	Episode: "Tudo Tem Seu Tempo"; Episode: "Tempo Amigo"
2016	O Negócio	Cibele	Episode: "O Amigo"
2017	Apocalipse	Tiatira Abdul	
2019	Ala Leste	Karla Munhael	
2021	Gênesis	Adalia	
2021	Amélio, O Homem de Verdade	Amélio's mother-in-law	
2025	Três Graças	Xênica	

=== Films ===
Year	Title	Role	Notes
2008	Subsolo		Short film
2008	Mãe	Mãe	Short film
2014	Chess Game	Beth	

== Theater ==
Year	Title	Notes
1985	Valsa nº 6	
1987	Calibã	
1990	O Rei Arthur e os Cavaleiros da Távola Redonda	
1991	As Mil e Uma Noites	
1992	O Livro dos Cegos	1992–1994
1996	A Noite de Todas as Ceias	
2001	As Lágrimas Amargas de Petra Von Kant	
2003	Melanie Klein	
2004	Little Eyolf	2004–2006
2005	Nocaute	
2014	Duas Vezes um Quarto (2x1/4)	
