= Paoletti =

Paoletti is an Italian surname. Notable people with the surname include:

- Antonio Ermolao Paoletti (1834–1912), Italian painter
- Arturo Paoletti, Italian boxer
- Christian Paoletti (born 1984), Italian footballer
- Enzo Paoletti, Italian scientist
- Gabriele Paoletti (born 1978), Italian footballer
- Luigi Paoletti Vinea, 19th-century Italian painter
- Pietro Paolétti (1801–1847), Italian painter and engraver
- Roland Paoletti (1931–2013), British-Italian architect

== See also ==
- Paleotti, another surname
