= Simulation (disambiguation) =

Simulation is the imitation of the operation of a real-world process or system over time.

Simulation or The Simulation may also refer to:

- Computer simulation, simulation (as above) via computers
- Simulation video game, a video game that is a computer simulation
- Simulation preorder, a relation between state transition systems in computer science
- Diving (association football) (also known as simulation), misconduct in association football

== Media ==
- Simulation (film), a 2017 Iranian drama film
- Simulation (journal), a computer science academic journal
- The Simulation, a 2019 album by American heavy metal band Born of Osiris
- "Simulation", song by Tkay Maidza from Tkay
- "Simulation", a house music song released in 2012 by Irish singer Róisín Murphy

== See also ==
- Simulator (disambiguation)
- Simulation hypothesis
