= Chess Game =

2014 Brazilian thriller film

- Theatrical release poster
- Directed by: Luis Antonio Pereira
- Screenplay by: Luis Antonio Pereira
- Starring: Antônio Calloni; Priscila Fantin; Tuca Andrada; Carla Marins; Salvatore Giuliano
- Cinematography: Kika Cunha
- Edited by: Marcelo Moraes
- Music by: André Paixão
- Production company: Eclectic Entertainment
- Distributed by: Elo Company
- Release date: 20 March 2014
- Running time: 90 minutes
- Country: Brazil
- Language: Portuguese
- Budget: $1 million

Chess Game (Portuguese: Jogo de Xadrez) is a 2014 Brazilian thriller film written and directed by Luis Antonio Pereira.

The film follows the story of a woman who is sentenced to prison because of a social security fraud involving a senator. The senator fears that she can tell the truth to the authorities, so he bribes the prison warden to prevent her from telling the truth.

== Cast ==
- Antônio Calloni as Senator Franco
- Priscila Fantin as Mina
- Tuca Andrada as Diretor Geraldo
- Carla Marins as Beth
- Salvatore Giuliano as Eugênio
- Tarciana Saad as Delegada Bandeira
- Wesley Aguiar as Alberto
- Luana Xavier as Martona
- Martha Paiva as Déia
- Carla Franca as Barney
- Fabiano Costa as Xavier
- Fabio Nascimento as Valtinho
- Erlene Melo as Nurse
