= Insônia =

2012 film directed by Beto Souza

- Theatrical release poster
- Directed by: Beto Souza
- Based on: Insônia by Marcelo Carneiro da Cunha
- Starring: Daniel Kuzniecka; Leonardo Machado; Miguel Gonçalves Carvalho; Luana Piovani; Lara Rodrigues
- Production company: Panda Filmes
- Distributed by: Espaço Filmes
- Release dates: August 2012 (Festival de Gramado); February 14, 2014
- Running time: 91 minutes
- Country: Brazil
- Language: Portuguese

Insônia is a 2012 Brazilian romantic comedy film directed by Beto Souza, based on the book of the same name by Marcelo Carneiro da Cunha.

The film was shot in 2007 and was only completed in 2012, premiered at the Festival de Gramado. The film was released theatrically in Brazil in 2014.
