= Cristina Lark =

Actress

- Modeling information
- Height: 5 ft 4 in (1.63 m)
- Hair color: Brown
- Eye color: Hazel
- Website: www.cristinalark.com

Cristina Lark (born September 18) is an international actress.

She completed a Master's degree at the Royal Academy of Dramatic Arts, having previously studied with Manuel Lillo and Boris Rotenstein in Barcelona at the University of São Paulo) and Celia Helena Drama School (Escola Superior de Artes Célia Helena). She became known for acting in web series such as The Bloody Mary Show and short films and creating the web series It's Not You...., later adapted to Brazilian Portuguese and translated into Não É Você..., which was nominated for the Best Ensemble Performance (Comedy) Award at the 1st Rio Web Fest. She also starred several theater productions in the UK, Spain and Brazil. Cristina is also a vlogger, best known for her YouTube channel "Produtor de Casting da Depressão".

== Filmography ==
=== Web series ===
- 2015 Não É Você... - Laura
- 2014 Against The Clock - Christina
- 2013 It's Not You... - Laura
- 2012 The Bloody Mary Show - Bathory
- 2010 Next Day Vision (pilot) - Rosa Meleño

=== Cinema ===
- 2016 Ainda Estamos Aqui
- 2016 Four Wise Monkeys
- 2011 Lifetime Guarantee - shop assistant
- 2009 Carson & Morrison - bag girl
- 2008 Obitus - Marta

=== Theater ===
- 2014 Who da Man?
- 2013 Postcards From Medea
- 2012 Macbeth - Witch
- 2011 The house of Bernarda Alba - Adela
- 2011 Wife for Sale - Irina
- 2011 Blood Wedding - young girl
- 2006 Em Transporte - Guardian
- 2006 Acalanto - Holy Whore / Blue Old Lady
- 2006 This Property is Condemned - Willie
- 2006 The Wild Duck - Gina Ekdal
- 2005 The Intruder - Ursula
- 2005 Rumores... - Dona Eudoxia

=== Voice ===
- 2012 Eyes On Us - voice in Portuguese (audiocue)
- 2012 Dead End Kids - voice in Portuguese and Spanish
