= Gabriel Wainer =

Canadian Computer Scientists

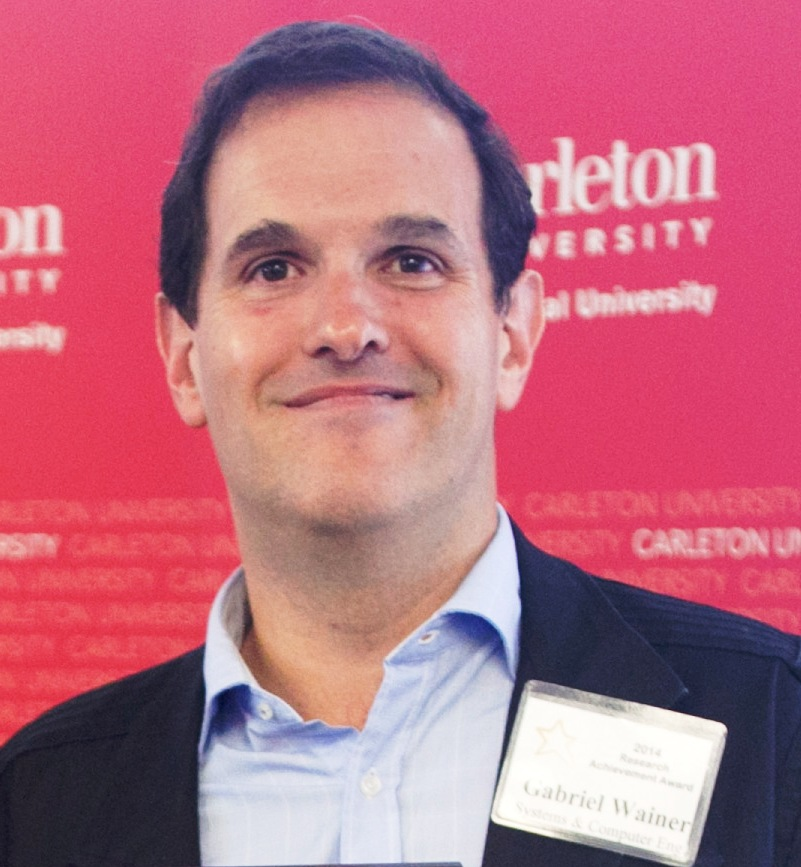
- Born: Gabriel Andrés Wainer; Buenos Aires, Argentina
- Education: University of Buenos Aires and Aix-Marseille University
- Known for: Scientific contributions to Modeling and Simulation
- Awards: Fellow of The Society for Modeling and Simulation International (SCS) Fellow of the European Alliance for Innovation (EAI) McLeod Founder's Award for Distinguished Service to the Profession (SCS)
- Scientific career
- Fields: Computational Science and Engineering
- Workplaces: Carleton University

Gabriel Andrés Wainer is a Canadian–Argentinian computer scientist. He is a professor in the Department of Systems and Computer Engineering at Carleton University in Ottawa, Canada. He is known for his research in modeling and simulation, in particular his work related to the DEVS formalism.

== Education and career ==
Wainer graduated in 1993 as a Licenciado in Computer Science from the University of Buenos Aires. He completed his Ph.D. in software engineering in 1998 at Aix-Marseille University/University of Buenos Aires. In July 2000, he joined the Department of Systems and Computer Engineering at Carleton University (Ottawa, Canada). He held research positions at the University of Arizona, LSIS (CNRS), University of Nice Sophia-Antipolis, INRIA Sophia-Antipolis, University of Bordeaux, University of Buenos Aires, and others.

Wainer co-founded several modeling and simulation conferences: SIMUTools, ANNSIM (SCS/IEEE/ACM), the Symposium on Theory of Modeling and Simulation (SCS/ACM/IEEE), and Symposium on Simulation in Architecture and Urban Design - SimAUD (SCS/ACM/IEEE). He was Vice-President Conferences and Vice-President Publications of SCS for the Society for Modeling and Simulation International from 2010 to 2016.

He is editor in chief of Simulation and a Distinguished Speaker of ACM (Association for Computing Machinery).

== Selected publications ==
- Saadawi, Gabriel; Wainer, Hesham (2013), "Principles of discrete event system specification model verification", Simulation, 891 (1): 41–67, doi:10.1177/0037549711424424.
- Wainer, Gabriel; Glinsky, Ezequiel; Gutiérrez-Alcaraz, Marcelo (2011), "Studying performance of DEVS modeling and simulation environments using the DEVStone benchmark", Simulation, 87 (7): 555–580, doi:10.1177/0037549710395649.
- Liu, Qi; Wainer, Gabriel (2007), "Parallel Environment for DEVS and Cell-DEVS Models", Simulation, 83 (6): 449–471, doi:10.1177/0037549707085084.
- Wainer, Gabriel; Giambiasi, Norbert (2002), "N-Dimensional Cell-DEVS", Discrete Event Dynamic Systems, 12 (4): 135–157, doi:10.1023/A:1014536803451.
- Wainer, Gabriel (2002), "CD++: a toolkit to develop DEVS models", Software Practice and Experience, 32 (13): 135–157, doi:10.1002/spe.482.
- Wainer, Gabriel (1995), "Implementing Real-Time Services in Minix", Operating Systems Review, 29 (3): 75–84, doi:10.1145/206826.206846.

== Books ==
- Real-Time Systems: concepts and applications (in Spanish), G. Wainer. Nueva Librería, Buenos Aires, Argentina. 1997.
- Methodologies and tools for discrete-event simulation (in Spanish). G. Wainer. Nueva Librería, Buenos Aires, Argentina. 2003.
- Discrete-Event Modeling and Simulation: a Practitioner's approach. G. Wainer. CRC Press. Taylor and Francis. 2009.
- Discrete-Event Modeling and Simulation: Theory and Applications. G. Wainer, P. Mosterman Eds. Taylor and Francis. 2011.
