= Gustavo Goulart =

Brazilian actor and singer

- Born: September 26, 1989 (age 36); São Paulo, Brazil
- Occupations: Actor and singer
- Years active: 1993–present
- Known for: Whose Line Is It Anyway? and Young Hearts
- Height: 187 cm (6 ft 2 in)

Gustavo Goulart (born September 26, 1989) is a Brazilian actor and singer.

He started his career at four years old, with films and series in his country of origin (Brazil), and also overseas, in many countries. He had some roles at Rede Globo as an actor, but decided to focus on his international career.

As a singer, his discography has two albums: Estúdio A: My First (2006 – original songs), and Southern Chords: Worldwide Hits (2016 – cover songs), both distributed worldwide and available in online music stores and streaming services.

The filmography below is partial. It contains only the most important films and TV series in which Gustavo has worked in each year of his career. It displays only one (or some) of his functions in each job, as he often works in several functions in the same project.

== Filmography ==
=== Television ===
Year	Title	Role	Notes
1994 to 2001	Herói do G	Herói do G (voice)	Lead Actor, Director, Writer
1995	Tales of the Serengeti	(none)	Director
1999	Fantastic	Himself	Interviewed
2007	Tropical Paradise	Vinícius (Amigo de Mateus)	Supporting Actor
2008	The Restaurateurs	Fabio Bellini	Lead Actor
2009 to 2011	Young Hearts	Juninho / Marcelo (Bad Boy)	Supporting Actor
2009 to 2019	Whose Line Is It Anyway? (Brazilian Version)	Player (Himself) / Master of Ceremonies (MC)	Lead Actor
2010	Festival De Curitiba (Infomercial)	Himself	Presenter (Host)
2011	Date Me	Christian	Special Guest Star
2012	The High School	Caio	Lead Actor
2014	Powerade: 2014 FIFA World Cup (Worldwide Commercial)	(none)	Director & writer
2014	The Real Acting (Infomercial)	Himself	Presenter (Host)
2015	Surviving the Serengeti (TV Documentary)	(none)	Director
2016	Unboxing Coca-Cola (International Commercial)	Main Narrator (voice)	Lead Actor

=== Film ===
Year	Title	Role	Notes
1993	Allowed	Levon Banks	Lead Actor
1994	American Forces	Joel Gun	Lead Actor
1995	Keep This Secret	Kieran Taylor	Lead Actor
1996	But I'm Right!	Ronald Flint	Lead Actor
1996	The Real Deal	Renèe Dumont	Lead Actor
1997	Seems to Be	Scott Davis	Lead Actor
1997	Moon	Josh Stonemann	Lead Actor
1998	Money for Nothing	Peter Gosling	Lead Actor
1998	Sacred Bodies	Taylor O'Connor	Lead Actor
1998	Skin Deep	Paul Barden	Lead Actor
1999	Don't Push	Ray McKinna	Lead Actor
1999	How to Get Rich in Africa	Dick Holmes	Lead Actor
2000	Bank Robbers Club	Seth Wilson	Lead Actor
2000	Next	Gavin Winstein	Lead Actor
2001	São Paulo: 447th Anniversary (Documentary)	Himself	Interviewed
2001	Mars?	Jake Mars	Lead Actor
2002	Chinese Mafia	Jerry Simons	Lead Actor
2002	Addo: The King of the Beasts (Documentary)	(none)	Producer & writer
2003	Outstanding, Great, Amazing, Perfect!	Will Flyntt	Lead Actor
2004	Collective Unconscious	Harry Walters	Lead Actor
2006	Lie	Martin Caine	Lead Actor
2007	Joanna, Gone Girl	Caesar	Lead Actor
2007	African Bambi (Documentary)	(none)	Director & writer
2008	Asphalt Flowers	Lucas	Lead Actor
2009	Systems	Daniel	Lead Actor
2009	The Idiot Is Me	(none)	Director & writer
2009	If You're Looking for Trouble	Seven Different Characters	Lead Actor
2009	My Family	André Dias	Lead Actor
2009	Nothing But a Love Song	Johnny	Lead Actor
2010	The Butterfly Effect	Jonas	Lead Actor
2010	Definition	George	Lead Actor
2010	It Drives Me Crazy!	Gustavo Goulart	Lead Actor
2010	What The Flowers Have Brought Us	Edgard	Lead Actor
2011	Your Time's Up: Audition	(none)	Director & writer
2011	The Last Words	Ferdinand	Supporting Actor
2013	The Adventures of Sheriff Kid McLain	The Grave Digger	Lead Actor
2014	In Your Atmosphere	John Mayer	Lead Actor
2015	Fancyland	Charlie Vegas	Lead Actor
2016	Walking After You	Psycho Killer	Lead Actor
2016	Mardi Gras: Spring Break	Mike Morgan	Lead Actor
