= Nana Gouvêa =

Brazilian actress (born 1975)

Nana Gouvea
- Born: Sebastiana Gouvêa Moraes; May 3, 1975 (age 50); Jataí, Goiás, Brazil
- Occupation: Actress
- Spouse(s): Danny Alexsanders Aguiar Silva (1991-1993), Carlos Fernandez (2012-2019)
- Children: 2
- Website: instagram.com/nanagouveaofficial

Sebastiana Gouvêa Moraes (born May 3, 1975, in Jataí, Goiás) is a Brazilian actress.

== Biography ==
Nana began her career at age 10 as a photo model, and by age 15 was already recognized by the Brazilian brands Ellus, Fórum, São Paulo Alpargatas, DeMillus, Zoomp among others. However, she gained notoriety from a series of photo essays that began in Playboy Magazine in 1996, then presented as Botafogo's muse, a reference to her favorite team. After that period she was further highlighted in a sequence of sexy photo essays .

On TV, Nana starred in "Pantera do Faustão" in TV Globo (1996); Was the host on "Domingo Milionário" with J. Silvestre on TV Manchete (1997); appeared as a regular guest star on "Banheira do Gugu" on SBT (1998/99); starred in the soap opera Porto dos Milagres on TV Globo (2001), JK (2006), Amazônia, de Galvez a Chico Mendes (2007) featured in the soap opera Bicho do Mato for TV Record (2006). In 2008, she did Faça Sua História (TV Globo) and Lendas Urbanas on SBT. In April 2011, Nana appeared in the soap opera Araguaia for TV Globo, where she plays Jamila, who enchants an Arab tourist whom she eventually marries.

Nana is also known as one the most memorable Queens of the Brazilian Carnival of all time, starring in the show for 13 consecutive years, from 1996 to 2009, appearing for several Samba Schools including Caprichosos de Pilares, São Clemente, Unidos da Tijuca, Vila Maria and others.

In 2011, Nana moved to New York, where she studied Meisner Techniques at Esper Studios, with one of the best teachers in America, the renowned Terry Knickerboker (acting) and Gail Bell (Voice techniques). In the US, Nana has starred in several indie films such as the sci-fi terror Black Wake (2018), which she also produced, Blood Circus(2017), Linea del Sangre(2019), Lady Godiva(2020) and Bishop's Cove (2023).

In 2016/7, Nana Gouvea starred in the NHK Japan popular show "Otona No Kiso Eigo" ("Basic English for Adults") as the sweet beauty Isabella, becoming one of Japan's favorite actresses and celebrities.

== Personal life ==
Nana lives in New York City since 2011.

Nana married Carlos Keyes in 2011 and divorced in 2019. They have no children.

Nana is the mother of two girls from her first marriage to Danny Alexanders Aguiar Silva from 1991 to 1993, Daphynie Katerine Gouvea Aguiar, born on March 14, 1992, and Angel Kathleen Gouvea Aguiar, born on May 31, 1993, she also has one grandson, son of Daphynie, Noah Gouvea Alcantara, born on October 12, 2016.

Daughter of the lawyer, farmer and real estate investor Sebastião Gouvea Moraes and Laudenes Moreira Gouvea, a housewife, Nana has two siblings, Fernando Moreira Gouvêa and Maria Luiza Gouvêa with Nana being the youngest of the three.

== Filmography ==
=== Television ===
| Year | Title | Role | Note |
|---|---|---|---|
| 2001 | Porto dos Milagres | Lindinha | Cameo |
| 2001 | Casa dos Artistas | Herself | Reality show |
| 2003 | A Turma do Didi | Roberta | Cameo |
| 2004 | Sob Nova Direção | Ursinho | Cameo |
| 2005 | Zorra Total | Priscila | Cameo |
| 2006 | JK | Ninon Vesúvio | Cameo |
| 2006 | Bicho do Mato | Teca Toulouse | Cameo |
| 2007 | Amazônia, de Galvez a Chico Mendes | Léa | Cameo |
| 2008 | Faça Sua História | Veranista | Episode: "Caramuru" |
| 2010 | Sonho Dourado | Bia Herst | |
| 2010 | S.O.S. Emergência | Suellen | Episode: "Sim Senhor, Sim Senhora" |
| 2010 | Vendemos Cadeiras | Herself | Cameo |
| 2011 | Araguaia | Jamila | Cameo |
| 2017 | The Fever | Carmine | Co-star |
| 2017 | Otona No Kiso Eigo | Isabella | Co-star |

=== Film ===
| Year | Title | Ref. |
|---|---|---|
| 2000 | O Filho Pródigo | |
| 2016 | Black Wake | |
| 2016 | Blood Circus | |
| 2017 | Peripheral | |
| 2019 | Linea De Sangre | |
| 2019 | Killer Response | |

| 2020 || | ||Lady Godiva / Lady Godiva || |- |} | 2023 ||| | ||Bishop's Cove / Marquesa || |- |}
