= Variações (film) =

2019 Portuguese film

- Directed by: João Maia
- Starring: Sérgio Praia; Filipe Duarte
- Release date: 19 August 2019
- Running time: 109 minutes
- Country: Portugal
- Language: Portuguese

Variações is a 2019 Portuguese biographical film about Portuguese singer and songwriter António Variações. It was, by far, the most watched Portuguese film in Portuguese theatres in 2019.

== Cast ==
- Sérgio Praia - António Variações
- Filipe Duarte - Fernando Ataíde
- Victória Guerra - Rosa Maria
- Augusto Madeira - Luis Vitta
- Teresa Madruga - Deolinda de Jesus
