= Simulation (journal) =

- Discipline: Engineering & Computing
- Language: English
- Edited by: Gabriel Wainer

Publication details
- History: 1963-present
- Publisher: SAGE Publications
- Frequency: Monthly
- Impact factor: 1.377 (2020)

Standard abbreviations
- ISO 4: Simulation

Indexing
- ISSN: 0037-5497 (print); 1741-3133 (web)
- LCCN: 68041608
- OCLC no.: 992556

Links
- Journal homepage; Online access; Online archive

Simulation is a monthly peer-reviewed scientific journal that covers the field of computer Science. The editor-in-chief is Gabriel Wainer (Carleton University). The journal was established in 1963 and is published by SAGE Publications in association with the Society for Modeling and Simulation International.

== Abstracting and indexing ==
The journal is abstracted and indexed in Scopus and the Science Citation Index Expanded.
