= Luigi Paoletti Vinea =

Italian painter

Luigi Paoletti Vinea (active 1867–1890) was an Italian painter, mainly of landscapes and vedute painted outdoors. He studied with Fattori.

He was born in Florence. Among his works are Sul Mugnone alle Cascine, Sulle rive del Calambrone, Seravezza dal ponticino sul Rio grande; Paese presso Livorno; Porta Romana strada cencii, Pianura, Lonely Street, Sull'Arno, and In Casentino. Paoletti exhibited frequently at the Promotrice of Florence.
