= Gabriela Alves =

Brazilian actress

- Born: Gabriela Storace Alves; 1 January 1972 (age 53); Rio de Janeiro, Brazil
- Other names: Gabriela Storace; Gabriela Toulier
- Occupation: Actress
- Mother: Tânia Alves

Gabriela Storace Alves (born 1 January 1972 in Rio de Janeiro) is a Brazilian actress.

== Biography ==
At age five, Alves played an angel with a broken wing broken in Sítio do Picapau Amarelo. But not to be labeled only as the daughter of Tânia Alves (her father, Juan Toulier, was a Peruvian painter and died in 2006) between 15 and 20 she thought it best to stop that life as an artist because the work was harming her studies. At the time needed braces, and now definitely be forgotten by the directors. Once she completed the course of teaching, she decided to go to the United States to study theater in New York City. To support herself, she worked as a seller of ice cream.

When she returned to Brazil, she worked in public relations and as an event organizer to regain contacts. She was one of the first hostesses to operate in Brazil. She liked to wear clothes of the 1960s to draw customers' attention. From there, her artistic life took off.

== Career ==
She acted in several novels, such as Despedida de Solteiro (1992), Mulheres de Areia (1993), Tropicaliente (1994), Salsa e Merengue (1996), beyond the show O Pagador de Promessas (1988), among others. Among her television work, which gave her more projection was Mulheres de Areia. At age 22, it asked if I really wanted to be an actress when she was invited to participate in the novel.

She discovered the next singer and music projects developed, in which they allowed her voice. She took the stage with the project "Caetaneando", performing with other players, songs of composer Baiano. Then, stripped of prejudice and was doing the Mexican soap opera Marisol in SBT, where she played a singer.

She returned in 2011 and participated in the television soap opera Amor e Revolução exhibited by SBT.

== Filmography ==
=== Television ===
Year	Title	Role	Notes
1977	Sítio do Picapau Amarelo	Angel	Episode: "O Anjinho da Asa Quebrada"
1978	Sítio do Picapau Amarelo	Angel	Episode: "Memórias da Emília"
1981	Sítio do Picapau Amarelo	Candoca	Episode: "A Chave do Tamanho"
1985	Tenda dos Milagres	Ester (child)	Credited as "Gabriela Storace"
1988	O Pagador de Promessas	Lilinha	Support cast
1992	Despedida de Solteiro	Salete	Episode: "June 1"
1992	Story of O, the Series	Jacqueline	
1993	Mulheres de Areia	Glória (Glorinha)	
1994	Tropicaliente	Pitanga	
1995	Tocaia Grande	Sacramento	
1996	Salsa e Merengue	Assunção Muñoz	
1998	Estrela de Fogo	Érica	
1999	Mulher	Janaína	Episode: "A Bela Adormecida"
2000	Vidas Cruzadas	Josefa	
2002	Marisol	Zulema de Carvalho	
2005	Linha Direta	Nancy Nair de Oliveira	Episode: "Chico Picadinho"
2008	Faça Sua História	Neusa	Episode: "O Califa de Copacabana"
2011	Amor e Revolução	Odete de Oliveira Fiel	
2014	A Saga	Santa Rosa	

=== Film ===
- 1987 - Sonhos de Menina-Moça ... Eva
- 1994 - Era uma Vez... ... Princess Luar
