= Nicole Puzzi =

Brazilian actress and model (born 1958)

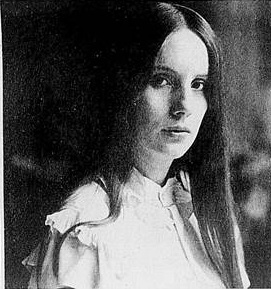
- Born: 17 May 1958 (age 68); Paraná, Brazil
- Occupations: Actress; model; television presenter

Tereza Nicole Puzzi Ferreira (born 17 May 1958) is a Brazilian actress, model, and television presenter. One of the popular Brazilian sex symbols of the late 1970s and early 1980s, she is considered a key figure of the Brazilian Pornochanchada film genre.

== Biography ==
Nicole originally hails from the Parana state, but left home at the age of 17 and started living in São Paulo in the 1970s. Before becoming an actress, Nicole was a model, worked in the circus and in shows with the group Os Trapalhões. After trying to work on Rede Tupi, she met Jean Garret, who took her to Boca do Lixo. She began her career in cinema from there in 1975, by acting in the film on Possuídas pelo Pecado. She emerged as a key figure of the pornochanchada of the late 1970 and late 1980s. Her notable films include Damas do Prazer (1975), The Prisoner of Sex (1978), Eros, the God of Love (1981), The Seven Vampires (1986), Gabriela (1983) and Eu (1987). Nicole has also acted in many soap operas.

Nicole was one of the speakers at the 2019 Path Festival held in São Paulo. She spoke about Art as a driver of innovation in the Center of São Paulo. In 2020, she appeared the first major online theater show in Brazil, the play The Art of Facing Fear. She has also presented the program Pornolândia on Canal Brasil.
