= Geraldo Hauers Alves =

Brazilian actor

Geraldo Alves
- Born: Geraldo Hauers Alves; May 5, 1935
- Died: February 19, 1993 (aged 57)
- Occupation: Actor

Geraldo Hauers Alves, known as Geraldo Alves (5 May 1935 – 19 February 1993) was a Brazilian actor, notable for the role in Faça Humor, Não Faça Guerra.

== Career ==
Alves started his career as a radio broadcaster at 15. He made his film debut in 1959 alongside Zé Trindade in Mujeres à Vista and then on TV in the 1960s. On TV he participated in the main humorous programs, among them Make Humor, Do Not Make War, Reopertura, The Trapalhões and Escolinha of Professor Raimundo.

He also acted as voice actor and was the voice of Winnie the Pooh in The New Adventures of Winnie the Pooh.

Alves died in 1993 of a heart attack.
