= Antônio Monteiro (actor) =

Brazilian actor, director and writer (born 1956)

- Born: Antônio dos Santos Monteiro; November 27, 1956 (age 69); Belém do Pará, Brazil
- Occupations: Actor, director and writer
- Years active: 1982–present

Antônio dos Santos Monteiro (born November 27, 1956) was a Brazilian actor, director and writer.

He began his career of actor and clown in 1981 to 25 years of age. His name was first clown Ventania it was a name of another clown, who remained for two months, then switched to Pirulito, but had difficulties to differentiate from another clown with the same name, then switching to Xantillyn.

He acted in several pieces of theatre in Belém and other cities.
