= Antonio Grassi =

Italian presbyter

Blessed Antonio Grassi C.O.
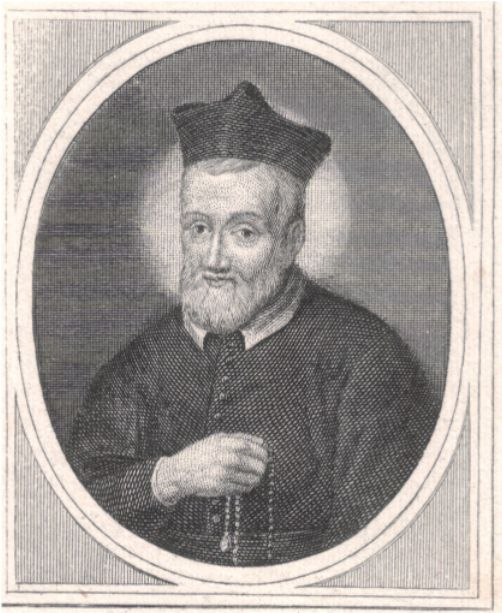

Priest
- Born: 13 November 1592; Fermo, Papal States
- Died: 13 December 1671 (aged 79); Fermo, Papal States
- Venerated in: Roman Catholic Church
- Beatified: 30 September 1900, Saint Peter's Basilica, Kingdom of Italy by Pope Leo XIII
- Feast: 13 December; 15 December (Oratorians)
- Attributes: Cassock; Rosary

Antonio Grassi (13 November 1592 – 13 December 1671), born Vincenzo Grassi, was an Italian Roman Catholic priest and a professed member of the Oratorians. Grassi was known for his humble and pious nature with a strong devotion to the Marian devotions of Loreto to where he made pilgrimages on an annual basis.

Grassi was seen in Fermo as a famous confessor and a counselor who often served as a mediator between warring factions. But among the Oratorians he was known for his strong devotion to the Rule of Saint Philip Neri.

Pope Leo XIII celebrated his beatification on 30 September 1900.

== Life ==
Vincenzo Grassi was born on 13 November 1592 in Fermo to distinguished parents who ensured that Grassi's childhood was both simple and pious. His father died when he was ten around the same time he had contracted a long illness. After the death of his father he began a period of spiritual direction under Father Ricci who had known Saint Philip Neri himself.

Grassi studied at the Curate of Saint Peter and also attended the Church of S. Spirito dei Padri dell'Oratorio for additional studies. He assumed the name of "Antonio" after he entered the Oratorians on 11 October 1609. Grassi was later ordained to the priesthood on 17 December 1617 and received ordination from the Bishop of San Miniato Alessandro Strozzi. During his studies he garnered considerable knowledge of sacred scripture as well as Thomas Aquinas and the Church Fathers.

In his duties as a priest he was known for his devotion to catechetical work and for preparing children for the reception of the sacraments. He also spent hours in the confessional and claimed that the main task of a priest was to help and to console parishioners who needed to confess their sins. The Governor admired him to the point of putting Grassi's portrait in the town hall as a form of commemoration and recognition for his services as a mediator between warring factions. His devotion to charitable works was boundless: he provided to all those who were poor and sought alms to continue his work. The extent of this was so proverbial that fellow Oratorians criticized him for excessive donations and works – but Grassi said that Divine Providence would provide and would work through them.

In 1625 he travelled on a pilgrimage to Rome to obtain the Jubilee indulgence of Pope Urban VIII. During this pilgrimage he visited the churches and other places that were related to the life of Saint Philip Neri; he learnt much more about him from Father Consolini who served as a guide. Soon word of his personal holiness would reach Urban VIII and his advisors and this won Grassi the esteem of the pope. On an annual basis he also made a Marian pilgrimage to Loreto where on one occasion a miracle took place: lightning struck him that knocked him unconscious but left him unharmed and his clothes singed; this took place on 4 September 1621.

In 1635 he was elected as the superior of the Fermo Oratorians.

Grassi suffered a period of ill health in 1671 and had at his bedside the Archbishop of Fermo Giannotto Gualterio who was with him when he died on 13 December 1671; Grassi said to his confreres: "What a beautiful thing it is to die as sons of Saint Philip!" His remains were buried in the Chiesa del Carmine di Fermo.

== Beatification ==
The Cardinal Leandro Colloredo – a fellow Oratorian – demanded that the cause for beatification be opened in Fermo. It led to a subsequent investigation on his life of heroic virtue and the verification of two miracles attributed to his direct intercession.

Following the fulfilment of these prerequisites, Pope Leo XIII beatified him on 30 September 1900.
