= Malhação =

Brazilian teen soap opera

- Genre: Soap opera
- Created by: Andrea Maltarolli; Emanuel Jacobina
- Directed by: Mário Márcio Bandarra
- Country of origin: Brazil
- Original language: Portuguese
- No. of seasons: 27
- No. of episodes: 6,203

Production
- Running time: 30 minutes (1995–2013, 2016–2020); 40 minutes (2014–2016)
- Production company: Estúdios Globo

Original release
- Network: TV Globo
- Release: 24 April 1995 – 3 April 2020

Related
- As Five

Malhação (Brazilian Portuguese: [maʎa'sɐ̃w], Young Hearts in English) is a Brazilian soap-opera that aired on TV Globo from 4 March 1995 to 3 April 2020. The series is targeted at a teenage audience. Each season runs for about a year with cast members changing every season.

== History ==
The soap opera began in 1995, and was initially set in a fictional Gym Club called Malhação on Barra da Tijuca, Rio de Janeiro. Through the years the setting varied each season. Although the name of the soap remained the same, it was set in the Múltipla Escolha (English: Multiple Choice) High School for nine seasons. In the twenty-second season, the location returned to be a gym, the Gael's Martial Arts Gym, placed within the art school Ribalta. The following season brought the high school setting back. From the twenty-fourth season onwards, the setting was changed back to the "Academia Form".

During the first fourteen seasons, each episode of Malhação began with a cold open scene, preceded by a recap of the previous episodes, continuing the narrative that follows. This technique was removed at the beginning of the fifteenth season.

The series has been broadcast in several countries by Globo Internacional, including SIC (between 1995 and 2007, airing with the name New Wave) in Portugal and by ABC Spark in Canada.

=== Cancellation ===
The series was cancelled after 27 seasons on 28 September 2021. The final season, Malhação: Toda Forma de Amar, finished with 253 episodes, a reduction from the planned 288 episodes that was forced by the COVID-19 pandemic. The series had been renewed for a twenty-eighth season titled Malhação: Transformação, written by Márcia Prates and Priscila Steinman, which also had its production suspended by the COVID-19 pandemic and postponed to 2021. Transformação was eventually scrapped and replaced by Malhação: Eu Quero é Ser Feliz written by Eduardo and Marcos Carvalho, until the series was cancelled altogether.

== Plot ==
Malhação revolves around the everyday life of teenagers, their conflicts, including school, friends, families, and especially their relationships, which occupy the central focus of all the seasons. Every season, a different couple of protagonists occupies the core of the whole storyline.

== Cast ==
Similar to American soap operas and long-running television series, cast and characters change each season, but actors who have stayed for more than one season include Gustavo Goulart, Alexandre Slaviero, and Sérgio Hondjakoff.

== Series overview ==
Series	Title	Episodes	Originally released	
Series	Title	Episodes	First released	Last released
1	Malhação	179	24 April 1995	29 December 1995
2	Malhação	195	8 April 1996	3 January 1997
3	Malhação	200	31 March 1997	2 January 1998
4	Malhação	110	30 March 1998	2 October 1998
5	Malhação.com (Malhação Ao Vivo)	270	5 October 1998	15 October 1999
6	Malhação	125	18 October 1999	7 April 2000
7	Malhação	277	10 April 2000	4 May 2001
8	Malhação	248	7 May 2001	19 April 2002
9	Malhação	263	22 April 2002	25 April 2003
10	Malhação	188	28 April 2003	16 January 2004
11	Malhação	250	19 January 2004	14 January 2005
12	Malhação	258	17 January 2005	13 January 2006
13	Malhação	262	16 January 2006	12 January 2007
14	Malhação	193	15 January 2007	12 October 2007
15	Malhação	324	15 October 2007	9 January 2009
16	Malhação	215	12 January 2009	6 November 2009
17	Malhação ID	199	9 November 2009	20 August 2010
18	Malhação 2010	265	23 August 2010	26 August 2011
19	Malhação Conectados	249	29 August 2011	10 August 2012
20	Malhação: Intensa Como A Vida	228	13 August 2012	5 July 2013
21	Malhação Casa Cheia	241	8 July 2013	11 June 2014
22	Malhação Sonhos	280	14 July 2014	14 August 2015
23	Malhação: Seu Lugar no Mundo	250	17 August 2015	2 August 2016
24	Malhação: Pro Dia Nascer Feliz	180	22 August 2016	3 May 2017
25	Malhação: Viva a Diferença	213	8 May 2017	5 March 2018
26	Malhação: Vidas Brasileiras	288	7 March 2018	15 April 2019
27	Malhação: Toda Forma de Amar	253	16 April 2019	3 April 2020

== Theme songs ==
Malhação had 17 different theme songs:

Song	Artist	Season
"Assim Caminha a Humanidade"	Lulu Santos	1–5; 22 (Note: During season 22, the song was used for episodes aired from 24 April 2015 to 1 May 2015, for the series' 20th anniversary celebration.)
"Te Levar"	Charlie Brown Jr.	6–12
"Lutar Pelo Que é Meu"	Charlie Brown Jr.	13–14
"Paraíso Proibido"	Strike	15 (Note: Theme song for episodes aired from 15 October 2007 to 1 August 2008.)
"Daqui pra Frente"	NX Zero	15 (Note: Theme song for episodes aired from 4 August 2008 to 9 January 2009.)
"Bem ou Mal"	NX Zero & Túlio Dek	16
"Quem eu sou?"	Hori	17
"Lourinha Bombril"	Bangalafumenga	18
"Todos"	Marcelo D2 ft. Macaco	19
"Tempos Modernos"	Jota Quest	20
"Família"	Nando Reis	21
"Agora Só Falta Você"	Pitty	22
"Vida Inteira (Meu Lugar)"	Raimundos	23
"Pro Dia Nascer Feliz"	Titãs	24
"Bate a Poeira - Parte II"	Karol Conká	25
"Põe fé que já é"	Arnaldo Antunes	26
"Paula e Bebeto"	Milton Nascimento e IZA	27

== Spin-off ==
In November 2018, a spin-off series of Malhação: Viva a Diferença was announced for 2020, also written by Cao Hamburger and titled As Five. An original production for the Globoplay streaming service, it follows the five main characters at the beginning of their adult lives. The first season premiered on November 12, 2020 and its third season is currently in production.
