= Detonautas Roque Clube (album) =

Studio album by Detonautas Roque Clube
- Released: September 30, 2002
- Studios: Rock House Studio (Rio de Janeiro, Brazil)
- Genres: Melodic hardcore, alternative rock, rap rock, rapcore, nu metal
- Length: 49:42
- Label: WEA Music
- Producer: Fernando Magalhães

Detonautas Roque Clube chronology
Detonautas Roque Clube (2002)	Roque Marciano (2004)

Detonautas Roque Clube is the debut album by Brazilian rock band Detonautas Roque Clube, released on September 30, 2002 by WEA Music.

== Track listing ==
1. No Way Out
2. Outro Lugar
3. Quando o Sol Se For
4. Ei, Peraê!!!!
5. Olhos Certos
6. Nem Me Lembro Mais
7. O Bem e o Mal
8. Ladrão de Gravata
9. Mais Além
10. Que Diferença Faz?

== Credits ==
- Tico Santa Cruz: vocals
- Renato Rocha: lead guitars, backing vocals
- Rodrigo Netto: rhythm guitars, backing vocals
- Tchello: bass guitar
- Fábio Brasil: drums
- DJ Cléston: DJ, percussion
