= Psicodeliamorsexo&distorção =

Studio album by Detonautas Roque Clube
- Released: March 3, 2006
- Studio: Toca do Bandido (Rio de Janeiro, Brazil)
- Genre: Alternative rock, psychedelic rock, garage rock, post-grunge
- Length: 59:06
- Label: WEA Music
- Producer: Edu K

Detonautas Roque Clube chronology
Roque Marciano (2004)	Psicodeliamorsexo&distorção (2006)	O Retorno de Saturno (2008)

Psicodeliamorsexo&distorção (English: Psychedeliclovesex&distortion) is the third album by Brazilian rock band Detonautas Roque Clube, released on March 3, 2006 by WEA Music, being the group's last release on the label and also the last with guitarist Rodrigo Netto, who died on June 4 of the same year.

== Track listing ==
1. No Escuro o Sangue Escorre
2. Não Reclame Mais
3. Sonhos Verdes
4. Assim que Tem que Ser
5. Quem Sou Eu?
6. Dia Comum
7. Prosseguir
8. Você Me Faz Tão Bem
9. Ela Não Sabe (Mas Nós Sabemos)
10. Apague a Luz
11. Insone
12. Tudo O Que Eu Falei Dormindo
13. Um Pouco Só do Seu Veneno
14. The Wrong Life in the Right Way (Hidden track)

== Credits ==
- Tico Santa Cruz: vocals
- Renato Rocha: lead guitars, backing vocals
- Rodrigo Netto: rhythm guitars, backing vocals
- Tchello: bass guitar
- Fábio Brasil: drums
- DJ Cléston: DJ, percussion
