= O Retorno de Saturno =

Studio album by Detonautas Roque Clube
- Released: March 15, 2008
- Studio: Toca do Bandido (Rio de Janeiro, Brazil)
- Genre: Alternative rock, psychedelic rock
- Label: Sony BMG
- Producer: Detonautas Roque Clube, Tomás Magno, Fernando Magalhães

Detonautas Roque Clube chronology
Psicodeliamorsexo&distorção (2006)	O Retorno de Saturno (2008)	Acústico (2009)

O Retorno de Saturno (English: The Return of Saturn) is the fourth album by Brazilian rock band Detonautas Roque Clube, released on March 15, 2008 by Sony BMG, being the group's first release by the label and also the first without guitarist Rodrigo Netto, who died on June 4, 2006.

== Track listing ==
1. O Retorno de Saturno
2. Nada é Sempre Igual
3. Verdades do Mundo
4. Só pelo Bem Querer
5. Lógica
6. Tanto Faz
7. Oração do Horizonte
8. Soldados de Chumbo
9. Ensaio Sobre a Cegueira
10. Enquanto Houver
11. Eu Vou Vomitar em Você

== Credits ==
=== Detonautas Roque Clube ===
- Tico Santa Cruz: vocals, rhythm guitars
- Renato Rocha: lead guitar, backing vocals
- Tchello: bass guitar
- Fábio Brasil: drums
- DJ Cléston: DJ, percussion

=== Guest musicians ===
- Fabrizio Ioro: keyboards
- Fernando Magalhães: additional guitars
- Edu Planchêz: guest appearance on "Ensaio Sobre a Cegueira" with the poetry "Filhos da Morte Burra" (Kids of the Stupid Death).
