= Roque Marciano =

Studio album by Detonautas Roque Clube
- Released: April 23, 2004
- Studios: Toca do Bandido (Rio de Janeiro, Brazil)
- Genres: Melodic hardcore, alternative rock, post-punk
- Length: 42:31
- Label: WEA Music
- Producers: Tom Capone; Fernando Magalhães

Detonautas Roque Clube chronology
Detonautas Roque Clube (2002)	Roque Marciano (2004)	Psicodeliamorsexo&distorção (2006)

Roque Marciano (English: Martian Rock) is the second album by Brazilian rock band Detonautas Roque Clube, released on April 23, 2004 by WEA Music.

== Track listing ==
All music is composed by Detonautas.

No.	Title	Lyrics	Length
1.	"O Amanhã" (The Tomorrow)	Rodrigo Netto, Renato Rocha, Tico Santa Cruz	3:27
2.	"Nada Vai Mudar" (Nothing Will Change)	Netto, Santa Cruz	3:48
3.	"O Dia que Não Terminou" (The Day That Didn't Ended)	Santa Cruz	4:58
4.	"Mercador das Almas" (Merchant of Souls)	Netto, Santa Cruz	3:05
5.	"Só por Hoje" (Just for Today)	Netto, Santa Cruz	4:00
6.	"Com Você" (With You)	Netto, Tchello	3:43
7.	"Silêncio" (Silence)	Santa Cruz	3:55
8.	"Meu Bem" (My Dear)	Netto, Rocha, Santa Cruz	3:36
9.	"Tênis Roque" (Sneakers Rock)	Santa Cruz	3:15
10.	"Tô Aprendendo a Viver Sem Você" (I'm Learning to Live Without You)	Netto	3:55
11.	"Send U Back"	Santa Cruz	4:46

Multimedia tracks
No.	Title	Length
12.	"O Som dos Corais" (The Sound of the Corals)	3:44
13.	"Quando o Sol se For" (When the Sun Goes Down; acoustic version)	3:11

== Credits ==
Detonautas Roque Clube

- Tico Santa Cruz: vocals
- Renato Rocha: lead guitar
- Rodrigo Netto: rhythm guitar, backing vocals
- Tchello: bass guitar
- Fábio Brasil: drums
- DJ Cléston: DJ, percussion

Additional musicians

- Tom Capone: additional bass and guitars, programming
- Fernando Magalhães: additional bass and guitars

Production

- Fernando Magalhães: production
- Tom Capone: A&R, production, recording, mixing
- Álvaro Alencar: co-production, recording, mixing
- Wagner Vianna: executive producer
- Fernando Rebelo: additional recording, recording assistant
- Plínio Gomes: additional recording, recording assistant
- Tomás Magno: additional recording, second mixing engineer
- Ricardo García: mastering
- Silvio Charles: roadie
- Michel Harley: roadie

Design

- Christiano Menezes: artwork, Illustration
- Cristina Portella: artwork
- Silvia Panella: graphic coordination
- Marcos Hermes: photography
