= Natallia Rodrigues =

Brazilian actress (born 1980)

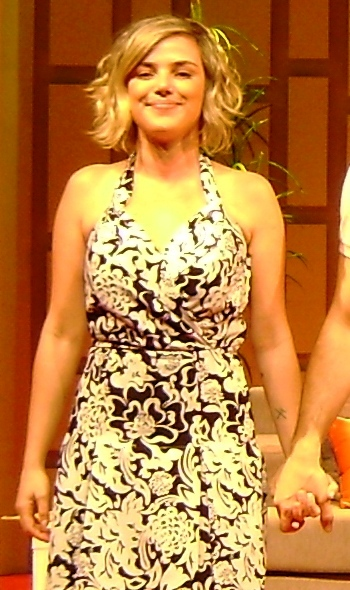
- Natallia Rodrigues in November 2010
- Born: Nathália Cataldo Rodrigues; December 9, 1980 (age 45); Bariri, Brazil
- Occupation: Actress
- Spouse: Tchello (2009-2014)

Nathália Cataldo Rodrigues (born December 9, 1980, in Bariri, Brazil) is a Brazilian actress.

== Biography ==
Natallia is the daughter of a former priest, now market consultant and a marketing director. She graduated from the School of Dramatic Art at the University of São Paulo.

She debuted on TV as a child, as an assistant stage game show Show Maravilha in SBT. Modeling career began at the age of ten and fifteen she started to study theater. She moved to Rio de Janeiro at twenty-one years and landed a role in the soap opera Desejos de Mulher, Rede Globo. Her character, Paty, was the daughter of the characters of José Wilker and Renata Sorrah.

In 2007, Natallia joined the cast of the show Alta Estação as the character Taíssa. In the same year, she played Laura, a prosecutor of Justice who falls for a young fisherman in the novel Luz do Sol, even on Rede Record. In 2008 lived the character Suelen a suburban Rio fascinated by fame Chamas da Vida.

After five years in Record, Natallia Rodrigues is back at the Globo network. She returns in a cameo in the telenovela Insensato Coração. In 2012 participated in the remake of Gabriela, the plot played the Russian prostitute Natasha.

In August 2012 the cover of the Brazilian edition of Playboy magazine in a special edition with 50 pages commemorating 37 years of revista. In 2013 returns with the novels Amor à Vida, the plot she will interpret the nurse Elenice.

She was married to Tchello, bassist Detonautas Roque Clube.

== Career ==
=== Television ===
Year	Title	Role	Notes
2002	Desejos de Mulher	Paty (Patrícia Vonnegut Britz)	
2003	Malhação	Carla Martins	
2004	Linha Direta	Marina Andrade Costa	Episode: "O Crime do Sacopã"
2005	Essas Mulheres	Nicota	
2006	Alta Estação	Taíssa	
2007	Luz do Sol	Laura	Cameo
2007	Louca Família	Soraya	Special Year End
2008	Chamas da Vida	Suelen Almeida Batista	
2011	Insensato Coração	Andressa Pereira	Cameo
2012	Gabriela	Natasha	
2013	Amor à Vida	Elenice Marinelli	
2014	A Segunda Vez	Fabi	
2014	Lili, a Ex	Mari	
2015	Verdades Secretas	Patrícia	
2019	O Doutrinador: A Série		

=== Film ===
Year	Title	Role
2004	Ella	Úrsula
2007	Valsa nº 6	Sônia
2011	Estamos Juntos	Francisca friend
2014	Os Homens São de Marte... E É Pra Lá que Eu Vou	Amanda
2018	O Doutrinador	Penélope
2020	Skull: The Mask	Beatriz Obdias

=== Theater ===
Year	Title
2001	Mancha Roxa
2001	Abajur Lilás
2002	Beijo no Asfalto
2004	Paris Belford
2004	Namoro ou Amizade
2011	Vamos?
2012	Cortex
2012	Desespero
2013	Divórcio
