= O Doutrinador: A Série =

- Genre: Action-thriller
- Starring: Kiko Pissolato; Tainá Medina; Samuel de Assis; Carlos Betão; Nicolas Trevijano; Eucir de Souza; Marília Gabriela; Eduardo Moscovis
- Country of origin: Brazil
- Original language: Portuguese
- No. of seasons: 1
- No. of episodes: 7

Production
- Producers: Sandi Adamiu; Marcio Fraccaroli; Renata Rezende; Bruno Wainer
- Cinematography: Rodrigo Carvalho
- Editor: Federico Brioni
- Production company: Paris Entretenimento

Original release
- Network: Space
- Release: September 1, 2019

O Doutrinador: A Série is a Brazilian action-thriller television series based on the homonymous comic series created by Luciano Cunha. The series was released on September 1, 2019 on Space and complements the events of the film of the same name released in November 2018.

== Cast and characters ==
- Kiko Pissolato as Miguel Montessant (O Doutrinador)
- Tainá Medina as Nina
- Samuel de Assis as Edu
- Carlos Betão as Antero Gomes
- Nicolas Trevijano as Diogo
- Eucir de Souza as Deputado Djalma Dias
- Marília Gabriela as Ministra Marta Regina
- Eduardo Moscovis as Sandro Corrêa
- Gustavo Vaz as Antero Gomes Filho (Anterinho)
- Natália Lage as Isabela Montessant
- Tuca Andrada as Tenente Siqueira
- Natallia Rodrigues as Penélope
- Helena Ranaldi as Julia Machado
- Lucy Ramos as Marina Sales
- Ricardo Dantas as Dantão
- Helena Luz as Alice Montessant
