= Renato Rocha =

Renato Rocha may refer to:

- Renato Rocha (guitarist) (born 1975), Brazilian singer-songwriter, guitarist and keyboardist with Detonautas Roque Clube
- Renato Rocha (bassist) (1961–2015), Brazilian musician and songwriter with Legião Urbana
