= Senhora do Destino =

Brazilian telenovela

- Also known as: Her Own Destiny
- Genre: Telenovela
- Created by: Aguinaldo Silva
- Directed by: Wolf Maya; Luciano Sabino; Marco Rodrigo; Cláudio Boeckel
- Starring: Susana Vieira; Renata Sorrah; Carolina Dieckmann; José Wilker; José Mayer; Eduardo Moscovis; Leandra Leal; Marcello Antony; Leonardo Vieira; Dado Dolabella; Letícia Spiller; Marília Gabriela; Tarcísio Meira; Roberto Bomtempo
- Theme music composer: Milton Nascimento; Fernando Brandt
- Opening theme: "Encontros e Despedidas" by Maria Rita
- Country of origin: Brazil
- Original language: Portuguese
- No. of episodes: 221

Production
- Running time: 75 minutes
- Production company: Central Globo de Produção

Original release
- Network: Rede Globo
- Release: June 28, 2004 – March 11, 2005

Related
- Señora del destino (2026)

Senhora do Destino (English: Lady of the Destiny) is a Brazilian telenovela that was produced and aired by Rede Globo from June 28, 2004, to March 11, 2005, with a total of 221 episodes. Replacing Celebridade and being replaced by América. Written by Aguinaldo Silva with the collaboration of Filipe Miguez, Gloria Barreto, Maria Elisa Berredo, and Nelson Nadotti. Directed by Luciano Sabino, Marco Rodrigo, Claudio Boeckel, with general and core direction of Wolf Maya. Nazaré Tedesco, Renata Sorrah's character, is the great villain of the plot and entered the history of Brazilian television drama as one of the best-known and cruel villains of Brazilian soap operas.

Featured Suzana Vieira, José Wilker, Carolina Dieckmann, Eduardo Moscovis, Letícia Spiller, José Mayer, Leonardo Vieira, Débora Falabella, Marcello Antony, Dan Stulbach, Tania Khalill, Carol Castro, Dado Dolabella, Marília Gabriela, José de Abreu, Leandra Leal and Renata Sorrah in leading roles.

== Production ==
The telenovela had the provisional title of Dinastia. But one businessman registered the mark before, and two months before its debut had its name changed to Senhora do Destino. Carolina Dieckmann and Adriana Esteves participated in the first phase, playing the characters Maria do Carmo and Nazaré Tedesco respectively. The first recordings started in May 2004. Dieckmann returned to the second phase of history to play Maria do Carmo's stolen daughter. Along with her, actress Renata Sorrah also appeared in the telenovela. Their first scenes in the second phase aired on the July 24, 2004, episode.

The telenovela had a first phase of four episodes showing the theme of the military dictatorship in Brazil. After that, the story takes place in a fictional time, which has characteristics of the early 1990s and the 2000s, as stated by the author. This has given rise to several criticisms, since, due to the age of Maria do Carmo's children (who appear to be between 30 and 35 years old), it is assumed that the story was about 25 years after AI-5 (between 1993 and 1994) and current cars were shown, the real as currency, adopted only in 1994, and merchandising of non-existent products at that time. The first phase of the plot lasted only the first two episodes. From the third episode, aired on June 30, 2004, the second phase begins.

=== Casting ===
Originally Regina Duarte was invited to play the protagonist Maria do Carmo, but the actress imposed as a condition that her daughter, Gabriela Duarte, should play Lindalva, which was not accepted by the board, since Carolina Dieckmann was already confirmed on the role, causing Duarte to refuse the character as a protest. The actress reversed the decision days later and contacted the board to accept the role, but Susana Vieira had already been confirmed in her place. Vieira was scheduled to play Nazaré, but with the problem with Duarte, was eventually moved to the role of Maria do Carmo, while Renata Sorrah was invited to play the antagonist at the request of Vieira herself who was her personal friend. Raul Cortez was going to play Colonel Justino in Cabocla, but gave up the character to accept the role of Barão de Bonsucesso at Aguinaldo Silva's request. The director thought of removing Marcello Antony from the cast when the actor was arrested for drug possession in April 2004, before starting the telenovela recordings, but decided to keep him.

Bárbara Borges was reserved for the telenovela when she was still in Malhação at the request of the author himself, who had already been pleased with her work in his telenovela Porto dos Milagres. Miriam Pires died on September 7, 2004, of toxoplasmosis after recording 62 episodes, but her character was not killed in the telenovela, having been established that she had been injured and needed to rest, but several characters were visiting her to continue the story.

== Transmission ==
In Brazil, the programme was broadcast again at Vale a Pena Ver de Novo from March 2 to August 21, 2009, in 123 episodes, replacing Mulheres Apaixonadas and being replaced by Alma Gêmea. During the screening of this rerun, episode 92, which was to air on July 7, 2009, did not air due to the broadcast of Michael Jackson's funeral. The episode 117, which would be aired on August 12, 2009, also did not air, due to the transmission of the friendly between Brazil and Estonia. It was re-aired from March 13 to December 8, 2017, in 195 episodes, replacing Cheias de Charme and being replaced by Celebridade (its original predecessor), making it the longest rerun of the track. Senhora do Destino has already been sold to 36 countries.

=== Opening ===
The opening of the telenovela and the song "Encontros e Despedidas" (composed by Milton Nascimento and Fernando Brant, performed by Maria Rita), showing photos of people, with color photos of the telenovela actors, while the black and white photos were of anonymous.

== Plot ==
The plot is divided into two phases. The first –aired in four chapters – takes place in December 1968, telling the story of three women: Josefa de Medeiros Duarte Pinto (Marília Gabriela), a journalist for the Diário de Notícias, a stunning and brave woman who becomes a mortal enemy of the dictatorship; Maria do Carmo Ferreira da Silva (Carolina Dieckmann), a humble northeastern woman who comes to the city of Rio de Janeiro in search of a better life for herself and her children; and Maria de Nazaré Esteves Tedesco (Adriana Esteves), a prostitute who wants to change her life at all costs and will play dirty for it.

First phase

Maria do Carmo, a suffering Northeastern woman, abandoned by her husband Josivaldo, leaves with her five children from Belém de São Francisco, in the Pernambuco hinterland, to Rio de Janeiro. She is desperate to see a better future for her children because she lives in extreme poverty. Therefore, she writes to her brother, Sebastião, asking him to receive them in his house. Sebastião works as a driver for Josefa de Medeiros Duarte Pinto, with whom he is secretly in love. She is the daughter of a traditional family and owner of the Rio de Janeiro newspaper Diário de Notícias, inherited after the death of her second husband. After a series of setbacks on the trip, Maria do Carmo and her children arrive in Rio de Janeiro on December 13, 1968, the very day of the decree of Institutional Act Number Five (AI-5). There is a great commotion in the streets of the City Center, taken over by protesters and riot police.

The Diário de Notícias, an opponent of the military regime, is invaded by the police, and Sebastião cannot fetch Maria do Carmo from the bus station. Since she lost her paper on the road where she had written her brother's address, she goes with her children looking for the newspaper, where she expects to find Sebastião. Maria do Carmo manages to take refuge with the children in an abandoned house. Nazaré, a prostitute from Madame Berthe's brothel, is also housed there. She wants to marry her lover José Carlos and change her life. So she pretends to be a nurse and to be pregnant because she believes that pregnancy is the only way to separate him from his wife and daughter. As she became sterile after 5 successive miscarriages, she invented that she was pregnant to force Jose Carlos to take over the child. In the abandoned place, Nazaré tells Maria do Carmo that her name is Lourdes and promises to take care of the children while Maria do Carmo takes Reginaldo, who had been injured, to the hospital. Being alone with the youngest, two-month-old Lindalva in her arms, Nazaré glimpses the chance to realize her plan and kidnap the girl. She decides to pretend to have given birth to the child, sensitizing her lover, who leaves his wife and daughter to be with her. Maria do Carmo's struggle to recover her stolen daughter is the guiding thread of the plot.

Desolate with the kidnapping of Lindalva, Maria do Carmo is lost in the streets of Rio. She is mistaken for a protester and arrested, along with two other men in particular: Dirceu de Castro, a reporter for the Diário de Notícias, who refuses to leave the newsroom of the newspaper, and Giovanni Improtta, a well-known gambler full of scams and shady activities in his life. Josefa is also arrested, has her newspaper closed, and is advised to leave the country, which takes her to a luxurious exile in Paris. Maria do Carmo, Dirceu and Giovanni are in neighboring cells in a prison, and the journalist hears the story of the Northeastern woman. Dirceu draws the attention of the prison commander, the wicked Commander Saraiva, to the mistaken identity, and the young woman is released. She encounters Sebastian by chance, and the two manage to prevent the children of Maria do Carmo, who had been taken to the Juvenile Court, from being sent to an orphanage. Maria do Carmo decides to settle in the same place where her brother lives, in Vila São Miguel, fictitious district of Duque de Caxias, in the Baixada Fluminense, and swears that she will dedicate her life to locate her daughter Lindalva.

Second phase

The years pass, and Maria do Carmo becomes a strong and successful woman, dedicated mother, owner of the Do Carmo building supply store, dear and respected in Vila São Miguel for her ethics and generosity. She still suffers because she never heard from Lindalva again, and no one has found the whereabouts of the kidnapper who she thinks is named Lourdes. She has an old romantic relationship with Dirceu, now editor and political columnist for a major Rio newspaper. The two live in separate houses and live a quiet relationship. But the northeastern woman has another admirer: the now former bicheiro Giovanni Improtta, who honestly liquidated all his past accounts and earns his living as president of the Vila Sao Miguel United samba school and disputes with Dirceu the love of Maria do Carmo. One of his characteristics is his inseparable bow tie, as well as the effort to speak correctly, which causes him to make several Portuguese grammar mistakes. His way of speaking fell in the favor of the public, who reproduced on the streets expressions such as “felomenal” (instead of “phenomenal”). Among the phrases popularized by the character are: "There are suitcases that come by train!"; "I'm going to lolly myself"; "Do not forget my motto: with Giovanni Improtta no problem"; "Then there is the saying by the unspoken, the unspoken by the said and, as always, the writing is worthwhile"; "Here you do, here you pay"; "In life, as in the restaurant, the bill always comes"; "Istrastegic output"; "The cow will fly!", "Time is roaring, and Sapucai is big!", "Giovanni Improtta, in charm and bone."

Giovanni is the father of João Manoel and Jenifer. A widower, he lives with his children and his mother-in-law, Flaviana. His girlfriend is the aspiring celebrity Danielle, whom he calls "Baby Nymph" (and he is called "Daddy"). But the former bicheiro, who keeps repeating his debt to the police or tax authorities, is in love even with Do Carmo, having to vie for his love with rival Dirceu, whom he calls "letter exchange."

Sebastião, Maria do Carmo's brother, married Janice and has three children: Eleonora, Venâncio and Regininha; He is the driver of the refined Pedro Correia de Andrade and Couto, Baron de Bonsucesso, and his wife, Baroness Laura - a happy couple who enjoy celebrating life, although they no longer have the same financial situation as before. The baron's money is managed by his son, Leonardo, who complains about his father's eccentric spending. After meeting Giovanni Improtta, the baron agrees to be his personal stylist and teaches the former boss, who addresses Laura as Dona Baroa, ensuring many comic moments in history. In the course of the plot, the baroness finds herself suffering from Alzheimer's.

The children of Maria do Carmo are headed in life. The eldest, Reginaldo, has become an ambitious politician who does not shy away from trying to take advantage of his mother's popularity, averse to his populist and demagogic profile. Maria do Carmo always knew that Reginaldo, known as Naldo, was never worth anything and was always false and in favor of his father who abandoned them in misery. Reginaldo wants to become mayor of Vila São Miguel and campaigns for the emancipation of the town, which is in the municipality of Duque de Caxias, in the Baixada Fluminense (RJ). He is married to Leila, with whom he has two children, Bruno and Bianca, but keeps a secret affair with his parliamentary advisor Viviane, as ambitious as he. Leila discovers her husband's unfaithfulness and, willing to catch him with his mistress, asks for help from Reginaldo's cousin Venancio to follow them to a motel. She tries to get to Reginaldo's room through the wall, but suffers a fatal accident as she falls from the building. Clever, Reginaldo reverses the situation, accuses his wife of being his cousin's lover, and convinces him not to deny the story. Sebastião believes and expels Venancio from home, unhappy with his involvement with his cousin's wife. The driver only makes his peace with his son months later, when he is in an accident and gets between life and death, being saved thanks to a blood donation made by his own father. Although forgiven, Venancio makes a point of telling his father the truth about Leila's death. Sebastião is disgusted by his nephew's attitude, but cannot tell the truth, as it would harm his son, who lied to the police. Already Reginaldo, widowed, marries Viviane, and the double arms many fights along the plot in favor of their personal interests. Among the frames are the false kidnapping of his own son, the arrest of the mother and the murders of the marginal Gypsy and Seboso.

Leandro, second son of Maria do Carmo, works as an accountant for Giovanni. He has a troubled relationship with his wife, Marinalva, a highlight of the Vila Sao Miguel Unidos samba school (better known as Nalva), which hides a passion for his brother-in-law Viriato, which causes many conflicts in his marriage.

Viriato, the third son of Maria do Carmo, is the head of Edgard Legrand's restaurant, Monsieur Vatel, in Ipanema, in the southern part of the city. Her fate intersects with Maria Eduarda's, Duda's, when he saves her from a robbery. Eduarda's parents, Leonardo and Gisela, do not accept their daughter's relationship with a lower-class man and do what they can to see her married to young federal deputy Thomas Jefferson. In the end, Leonardo discovers that he is the son of Butler Alfred with a cook who died in childbirth and was adopted by the Baron, which changes his outlook on life.

The youngest, Plínio, is a young womanizer who doesn't want to know about work and just thinks about enjoying life. He ends up in the trap of the independent Yara, a few years older woman who wants to be a mother and chooses him as a "surrogate father" without even consulting him. Although she only wanted to use it, Yara is forced to turn to Pliny when her company goes bankrupt. For the first time, then, the boy faces a responsibility in life.

Lindalva, the youngest stolen from Maria do Carmo and baptized as Like Isabel, has grown into a young woman who has a loving, respectful, and complicit relationship with the psychopath Nazareth, whom she thinks is her mother. Nazaré still lives with José Carlos and is always at war with stepdaughter Maria Claudia, who went to live with her father after her mother, abandoned by her husband, succumb to depression and die.

The farce of Nazaré begins to surface when photographer Rodolfo hands Dirceu a picture of a pregnant nurse with a baby on his lap taken by him during the riot in central Rio on December 13, 1968. Maria do Carmo e Leandro recognize the kidnapper. Dirceu asks Rodolfo to use computer programs to “age” the photo and get to the woman's current face. Then, he gets Maria do Carmo's story to be the subject of an investigative program on TV. José Carlos watches the program and tells Nazaré that he will report it. They argue and she pushes him off the stairs. On the floor, with severe chest pains, he asks Nazareth to take his medicine, but the villain throws it away, leaving him to die in Isabel's arms.

With the death of the man she thinks is her father and loves very much, Isabel begins to work in the restaurant Monsieur Vatel. She and Edgard fall in love, and Maitre Viriato doesn't even know that the boss's girlfriend is his missing sister. Isabel and Edgard's dating makes Nazaré desperate because the boy is Madame Berthe's grandson. At the end of the plot, Nazaré's fear is justified: it is the caffeine diary that confirms the story of the abduction. Before that, however, the villain gets many ready. She has as lover and ally the unscrupulous Josivaldo, the naughty husband of Do Carmo, who returns to the family after leaving her to have a wealth that no longer wanted, asking for alimony from his wife.

While Maria do Carmo continues to search for her daughter, Dirceu and Giovanni try hard to locate the girl. In one of these attempts, Angelica appears, who was found as a baby on the same day Lindalva disappeared. But Maria do Carmo's joy is short-lived: Angelica has a birthmark on her leg and therefore cannot be the kidnapped daughter. Even so, Maria do Carmo welcomes her home and makes her his secretary in the store. Angelica gets involved with Plínio, and the two end up getting married. In the course of the plot, she reunites with her real mother, Belmira, but is disappointed to find that she has abandoned her to marry a millionaire out of interest. That is why he decides to keep the story a secret. But Reginaldo and Viviane discover and force her to collaborate with the overpriced works of Vila São Miguel City Hall, issuing cold invoices at Do Carmo's store, and threaten to tell the truth about her origin to the Ferreira da Silva family if she doesn't obey them. Angelica gives in to blackmail, but one day the frame is discovered by the IRS inspectors who appear in the store. She manages to flee, but Maria do Carmo ends up being held responsible for the illicit acts and is caught red-handed for tax evasion and contempt of authority. Reginaldo learns that Angelica is hiding in the real mother's house and the threat of death if she doesn't leave town, as she fears her sister-in-law will reveal that he is involved in the scheme. But Pliny manages to locate the woman, learns her true story, and forces her to tell the truth to the police. And so can prove the innocence of Do Carmo, who promises to send Reginaldo to jail.

The siege against Nazareth is closing, with the collaboration of several friends of Maria do Carmo, including Claudia. She also becomes an ally of the Northeastern, since she always hated her stepmother and suffered a lot from her childhood. Claudia meets Leandro, who is interested in Isabel without suspecting that she is her sister Lindalva. He has a difficult time, because he has decided to separate from Marinalva, and confuses Isabel's friendship with love. Claudia warns about their feelings, the two approach and end up falling in love.

The ladder of the character's house and his scissors became symbols of his psychotic personality. At the same time, Nazaré was laughing at her curses - among other expressions, she referred to Maria do Carmo as “northeastern tapir”, called Claudia “songa monga” and Josivaldo “flagelladão” - and also made her laugh in scenes where praised himself before the mirror. One of the highlights of the plot was the meeting of Nazareth with Maria do Carmo, which gives her a good beating that leaves her bloody and broken.

Even after discovering that she was stolen from her real mother, Isabel still takes a while to accept Do Carmo as her mother. Nazaré apologizes to Isabel, says she kidnapped her because José Carlos forced her. Divided and sensitized, Isabel decides to stand by the shrew because she was raised by her as a mother and loves her very much, until she realizes her true character.

Jenifer, the studious daughter of Giovanni, and Eleonora, daughter of Sebastião, fall in love, and after much resistance the parents find themselves forced to accept romance, overriding prejudice. The two assume the relationship, live together and adopt a newborn, abandoned near the hospital where Eleonora works as a doctor. Jenifer and Eleonora did not form the only homosexual couple in the plot: Carnival Ubiracy, Bira, also had his partner, Turcão.

The Pedra Lascada community, located in Vila São Miguel, is the setting for the history of Rita de Cássia. Mother of Lady Daiane and Maikel Jackson, Rita is a victim of domestic violence and drug addiction. She picks up her husband, the marginal and evil Gypsy - who is trapped at the beginning of the plot - and wages a fight against drugs. Her life gets even more tumultuous when her 15-year-old daughter becomes pregnant with Shao Lin. He is a dreaded “fringe” in the community (his real name is Polybius), leader of an unoccupied class, and does not want to assume the paternity of the child. Later, Rita goes on to date the Portuguese taxi driver Constantino, who faces Gypsy in the name of his love. Daiane, already with her son in her arms, gets pregnant again, this time from Bruno, Reginaldo's son, but loses the baby. At the end of the plot, Shao Lin becomes a responsible boy, realizes that he is in love with Daiane and takes over his son. Daiane, in turn, begins to work on educating young girls, preventing them from the difficulties of early pregnancy.

Another theme that had repercussions was the drama lived by Seu Jacques. He has become a kind of representative of retirees who suffer from the delays, omissions, mismatches and humiliations imposed by the INSS. Outraged, he keeps repeating his story wherever he goes: a former salesman, his retirement was miscalculated, and his request for review has been going on for seven years. Seu Jacques, in humorous scenes, has become a ruthless "chronicler" of everyday life, with accurate and cutting analysis of reality.

Seu Jacques falls in love with Djenane, Nazaré's former colleague at the brothel, who reappears in the former prostitute's life to blackmail her, as he witnessed along with Madame Berthe that Nazaré kidnapped and forged the birth of Lindalva (Isabel), and threatens to tell everything to Isabel if Nazareth doesn't give her much money, because she knows where Madame Berthe's diary incriminating Nazareth is. During an argument with Nazareth, Djenane falls down the stairs and dies. Fearful of being suspected of her colleague's death, the vixen sets up a situation for people to think that Djenane had stolen her jewelry and too much money from her home and would have stumbled and fallen down the stairs. [23] At the end of the plot, Seu Jacques meets Djenane's sister and the two end up together. The core scenario is Bairro Peixoto, in Copacabana (southern Rio). Nazaré has done a lot and will do more: he killed a lover of his electrocuted, stole a lot of money from a bank and tried to kill Claudia with treasures, as well as emotional blackmail with Isabel.

Actress Marilia Gabriela returns to the soap opera as Guilhermina, Josefa's daughter, who becomes an obstacle in the realization of an old dream of Sebastião and Dirceu: reopening the Diário de Notícias. Guilhermina tries to prevent the auction of an original by the painter Cezanne, which Josefa had left for Sebastião, and whose income would be used to reopen the newspaper. The screen remained hidden for several years in the Ford Galaxie that Sebastião inherited from his former employer and keeps in his garage. [24] Despite the obstacles, the newspaper is reopened, and work on it Claudia, Alberto and Rodolfo. Guilhermina and Dirceu are surprised at first, and their meetings always end in exchange for accusations. Mutual hostility gives way to passion, and the two are together at the end of the story after Maria do Carmo agrees to marry Giovanni.

Reginaldo, denounced for his scams in the town hall of Vila São Miguel, is harassed by the people. He decides to hold a rally, where he hopes to once again deceive voters. Sebastião, however, reveals the truth about Leila's death to Maria do Carmo, who in turn tells the electorate everything. Reginaldo is booed and stoned by the popular. One stone in particular thrown by his former electoral corporal Merival hits him in the head and this time he dies.

Nazaré apparently dies after throwing himself from a bridge in the Paulo Afonso waterfall in Bahia. She commits suicide after abducting Linda, the daughter of Isabel and Edgard. Before Isabel, however, she redeems herself and gives him the baby before she jumps to her death. But Fausta, his former maid, sees the figure of a mysterious person very close to his home, implying that Nazareth might still be alive.

Leandro marries Claudia, who becomes pregnant. Viriato, after spending a period in France specializing in cooking, returns to Brazil and reunites with Duda, who is pregnant, with whom he had married. Plínio, married to Angelica, who becomes pregnant with him, earns from Yara the permission to stay with the son Dado, since she will move to Japan. Regininha becomes pregnant with her boyfriend João Manoel and they both rush the marriage. Danielle and Venancio, married, discover that they will be parents. Nalva marries Congressman Thomas Jefferson, and Viviane reappears in Brasilia, married to Victório Vianna (soap opera character Porto dos Milagres, who returned to Senhora do Destino as senator, played in both versions by Lima Duarte). Josivaldo ends up in the streets, like a ragged and freaking beggar, with the only friend, the statue of Carlos Drummond de Andrade, Maria do Carmo marries Giovanni. Through a narration by Maria do Carmo, viewers learn about the future of the young characters: Daiane wins the Nobel Peace Prize for her social role in raising awareness of teenage pregnancy and Bianca, granddaughter of Do Carmo and daughter of Reginaldo, will be elected mayor of Vila São Miguel, always seeking to ensure respect and honesty.

== Cast ==
Actor	Character
Susana Vieira	Maria do Carmo Ferreira da Silva
Renata Sorrah	Nazaré (Maria de Nazaré Esteves Tedesco)
José Wilker	Giovanni Improtta
José Mayer	Dirceu de Castro
Carolina Dieckmann	Maria Isabel Esteves Tedesco / Lindalva Ferreira da Silva / Maria do Carmo (young)
Marília Gabriela	Josefa Medeiros Duarte Pinto / Maria Guilhermina Medeiros
Dan Stulbach	Edgard Legrand
Eduardo Moscovis	Naldo (Reginaldo Ferreira da Silva)
Letícia Spiller	Viviane Vianna Ferreira da Silva
Marcello Antony	Viriato Ferreira da Silva
Débora Falabella	Duda (Maria Eduarda Corrêia de Andrade e Couto Ferreira da Silva)
Leonardo Vieira	Leandro Ferreira da Silva
Leandra Leal	Claudinha (Maria Cláudia Tedesco Ferreira da Silva)
Tania Khalill	Marinalva Ferreira da Silva (Nalva)
Dado Dolabella	Plínio Ferreira da Silva
Carol Castro	Angélica Ferreira da Silva
Ludmila Dayer	Danielle Meira
José de Abreu	Josivaldo da Silva
Glória Menezes	Laura Corrêa de Andrade e Couto (Baronesa de Bonsucesso)
Raul Cortez	Pedro Correia de Andrade e Couto (Barão de Bonsucesso)
Ângela Vieira	Gisela de Andrade e Couto
Wolf Maya	Leonardo Corrêia de Andrade e Couto
Elizângela	Djenane Pereira
Helena Ranaldi	Yara Steiner
Nelson Xavier	Sebastião Ferreira da Silva
Roberto Bomtempo	Gilmar de Souza
Yoná Magalhães	Flaviana Meira
Adriana Lessa	Rita de Cássia das Neves
Bárbara Borges	Jennifer Improtta
Mylla Christie	Eleonora Ferreira da Silva
Leonardo Miggiorin	Shao Lin (Políbio Vieira dos Santos)
Maria Maya	Regininha (Regina Ferreira da Silva)
Heitor Martinez	João Manoel Improtta
André Gonçalves	Venâncio Ferreira da Silva
Flávio Migliaccio	Jacques Pedreira (Seu Jacques)
Marcela Barrozo	Bianca Ferreira da Silva
Miriam Pires	Clementina Vieira da Silva
Ítalo Rossi	Alfred
Ana Rosa	Belmira
Thiago Fragoso	Alberto Pedreira
Mara Manzan	Janice Ferreira da Silva
Mário Frias	Thomas Jefferson Bezerra de Souza
André Mattos	Madruga (Vanderlei Madruga)
Cristina Mullins	Aurélia Vieira da Silva
Reinaldo Gonzaga	Rodolpho
Eduardo Fraga	Ubaldo
Stella Freitas	Cícera
Cristina Galvão	Jandira
Sílvia Salgado	Aretuza
Gottsha	Crescilda Duarte
Malu Valle	Shirley
Guida Vianna	Fausta
Luiz Henrique Nogueira	Ubiraci
Ronnie Marruda	Cigano (Gilson das Neves)
Nuno Melo	Constantino Pires
Jéssica Sodré	Daiane das Neves
Agles Steib	Maikel Jackson das Neves
Leonardo Carvalho	Gatto
Thadeu Matos	Bruno Ferreira da Silva
Cláudio Corrêa e Castro	Dr. Afonso
Beatriz Lyra	Nurse
Ilva Niño	Severina Pimentel (Dona Bil)

== Reception ==
=== Ratings ===
Timeslot	Episodes	Premiere		Finale		Rank	Season	Average viewership
Timeslot	Episodes	Date	Viewers (in points)	Date	Viewers (in points)	Rank	Season	Average viewership
Mondays—Saturdays; 9:00pm	221	28 June 2004	51	12 March 2005	60	#1	2004-05	50,4

The telenovela debut had 52 audience points. Hit a hearing record on October 14, 2004, when it scored 55 points. In the episode of that day was shown the scene of the first meeting between Maria do Carmo and her daughter Lindalva. This record was exceeded on October 26, 2004, when it registered 58 points. On the occasion, the scenes of the fight between Maria do Carmo and Nazaré were shown. The lowest rating of the telenovela is 34 points, registered on December 24 and December 31, 2004, Christmas Eve and New Year, respectively. The telenovela's highest audience was 65 points, reached in the penultimate episode.

Its last episode had 60 audience points. Its overall average was 50,4 points being the most watched telenovela of the 2000s in Brazil.
