= Anna Sophia Folch =

Brazilian actress

- Born: Anna Sophia Folch; August 18, 1985 (age 40); Rio de Janeiro, Brazil
- Occupation: Actress
- Years active: 2006–present
- Spouse: Ângelo Paes Leme (2008–present)

Anna Sophia Folch (born August 18, 1985) is a Brazilian actress. She has played the lead role in two telenovelas and plays the lead role in a television series.

== Biography ==
Anna Sophia Folch was born in Rio de Janeiro, and she married Ângelo Paes Leme in Petrópolis on September 6, 2008.

== Career ==
She started her career playing Flora, who was the mother of the character played by José Wilker, in the 2006 movie O Maior Amor do Mundo, directed by Cacá Diegues. Anna Sophia Folch played the lead role, Teresa Dias, in the same year in the telenovela Paixões Proibidas, co-produced by Rede Bandeirantes from Brazil and RTP from Portugal, and set in those countries in the 19th Century.

The actress played one of the lead roles in the 2008 Rede Globo's telenovela, Ciranda de Pedra. Anna Sophia Folch played the moralist Bruna Prado, who is one of the three daughters of the characters played by Ana Paula Arósio and Daniel Dantas, and despite being married, is attracted to the lawyer Rogério, played by Cláudio Fontana, who works in her father's law firm. She participated in the 2008 indie film Apenas o Fim, playing Cris, and guest starred in two Multishow television series, in 2010 in Vendemos Cadeiras as Adriana, and in 2011 in Adorável Psicose as Carla Brown, before being cast as the lead role Nina in the 2011 television series Cara Metade, also produced by Multishow. She portrays Heloísa in the 2012 telenovela Lado a Lado.

== Filmography ==
=== Film ===
Year	Title	Role
2006	The Greatest Love of All	Flora
2008	Apenas o Fim	Cris

=== Television ===
Year	Title	Role	Notes
2006–2007	Paixões Proibidas	Teresa Dias	
2008	Ciranda de Pedra	Bruna Toledo Silva Prado Müller	
2010	Adorável Psicose	Carla Brown	Episode: "Cinema Sozinha"
2011	Cara Metade	Nina	Main role
2013	Lado a Lado	Heloísa	Episode dated January 15, 2013
2013	Surtadas na Yoga	Marion	Main role
2014	Amor Veríssimo	Irene	Episode: "Retiro Espiritual"
2019	Os Homens São de Marte... e É pra lá que Eu Vou	Paula	2 episodes
