= Ronnie Marruda =

Brazilian actor and singer (born 1954)

- Born: 1954 (age 71–72); Rio de Janeiro, Brazil
- Occupations: actor; singer; street vendor
- Years active: 1995–present
- Known for: Portraying the role of Cigano in Senhora do Destino

Ronnie Marruda (born 1954) is a Brazilian actor and singer.

== Career ==
Marruda was born in Rio de Janeiro in 1954 and began his acting career in 1995, with his debut on TV Globo in 1999 in the telenovela Força de um Desejo, later playing roles in Os Maias (2001) and Senhora do Destino (2004). The role in Senhora do Destino was a breakthrough role in Marruda's career, interpreting Cigano (in Portuguese: Gypsy), an alcoholic and violent man who frequently beats his wife (Adriana Lessa) and children (Jéssica Sodré and Agles Steib).

In the 2010s, Marruda took part in other projects like Babilônia and Guerra dos Sexos. He is also a singer and was a vocalist of different bands, including Banda Bel, after the exit of Toni Garrido. Marruda's career did not succeed in his later life, and he only works sporadically, alternating acting with daily jobs like selling roasted chicken and cakes on the streets of southern Rio de Janeiro. In an interview in 2019 with the newspaper Extra, Marruda stated that he works when he is called for it, stating further that his economic situation is hard, barely making ends meet.

Marruda added in that interview that his jobs include dubbing and profits from the exhibitions of telenovelas he worked in when they are broadcast again, citing the case of Gemêlas and Paixões Proibidas.

== Selected roles ==
| Year | Title | Role | Notes |
|---|---|---|---|
| 1999–2000 | Força de um Desejo | Raimundo | First work on TV Globo |
| 2001 | Os Maias | Julião | Miniseries |
| 2004–2005 | Senhora do Destino | Cigano | Breakthrough role |
| 2005 | Alma Gêmea | Abílio | |
| 2006–2007 | Paixões Proibidas | José | |
| 2007–2008 | Caminhos do Coração | Pedreira | |
| 2008 | Natale a Rio | | Italian Christmas comedy film |
| 2012 | Guerra dos Sexos | Baltazar | |
| 2015 | Babilônia | | |
| 2019 | Verão 90 | Police officer | |
