= Ribeirão do Tempo =

- Created by: Marcílio Moraes
- Directed by: Edgard Miranda
- Starring: Bianca Rinaldi; Caio Junqueira; Juliana Baroni; Heitor Martinez; Antônio Grassi; Taumaturgo Ferreira; Ângelo Paes Leme; Liliana Castro; Cássio Scapin and more
- Opening theme: Pique do Tempo by Tom Zé
- Country of origin: Brazil
- Original language: Portuguese
- No. of episodes: 250

Production
- Running time: approx. 60 minutes

Original release
- Network: RecordTV
- Release: May 18, 2010 – May 2, 2011

Ribeirão do Tempo (English: Stream of Time; International title: River of Intrigues) is a Brazilian telenovela created by Marcílio Moraes, it is produced and aired by RecordTV from May 18, 2010 to May 2, 2011.

== Plot ==
In the plot, the audience will follow the stories of the residents and visitors of the small town of Ribeirão do Tempo, such as Eleonora Durrel, Arminda, Joca, Tito, Karina, Filomena and Querencio, among others.

Already in the beginning, several events transform the life of the inhabitants of Ribeirão, city that counts on a beautiful nature besides having a historical center.

Calm and tranquility give way to hectic days. On one side is the multinational presided over by Madame Durrel, who invests heavily in the city. On the other, there are radical sports, which invade the day-to-day life of the place and attract tourists from all over. To complete, a series of barbaric crimes terrorize all, without anyone being able to arrest the criminals or to understand the reason of that.

== Cast ==
=== Main cast ===
| Actor | Character |
|---|---|
| Bianca Rinaldi | Arminda Caligari |
| Caio Junqueira | João Carlos Pelago (Joca) |
| Juliana Baroni | Karina Santos Fernandes |
| Heitor Martinez | Senador Nicolau Feitosa |
| Ângelo Paes Leme | Tito Gomes do Arrepio |
| Liliana Castro | Filomena Miranda Durrel (Filó) |
| Taumaturgo Ferreira | Querêncio Miranda Durrel |
| Victor Fasano | Mr. Edward Briggs (Dr. Teixeira) |
| Antônio Grassi | Prof. Milton Flores |
| Angelina Muniz | Léia Pelago |
| André de Biase | Ari Neto (Ari Jumento) |
| Mônica Torres | Célia Santos Fernandes |
| Patricya Travassos | Clorís Fortunato Souza Gomes |
| Zé Dumont | Romeu Fulgêncio |
| Cássio Scapin | Sereno Flores |
| Giuseppe Oristanio | Bruno Fernandes |
| Umberto Magnani | Delegado Luiz Ajuricaba |
| Solange Couto | Sancha Fulgêncio |
| Flávia Monteiro | Marta Naidin |
| Ana Paula Tabalipa | Iara Macêdo |
| Íris Bruzzi | Beatriz Feitosa |
| Eduardo Lago | Lincon Rocha |
| Sílvia Salgado | Patrícia Rocha |
| Stella Freitas | Virgínia Ajuricaba |
| Aline Borges | Ellen Ribeiro Braga |
| Raymundo de Souza | Virgílio Carvalho |
| Rafael Calomeni | Newton da Costa Pereira |
| Rodrigo Phavanello | Sílvio Braga |
| Daniella Galli | Marisa Miranda |
| Thelmo Fernandes | Nasinho |
| Tião D'Ávila | Alfredo Lorota |
| Gilson Moura | Bill |
| Bruna di Tullio | Lílian Salgado |
| Mariana Hein | Zuleide Lima |
| Vitor Facchinetti | André Rocha |
| Louise D’Tuani | Sônia Ajuricaba |
| Carolina Bezerra | Carmem Ribeiro |
| Rejane Goulart | Larissa Castro |
| Jossana Vaz | Elza |
| Jaqueline Macoeh | Fátima |
| Letícia Medina | Diana P. Silva |
| Kaleo Maciel | Carlos da Costa Pereira Lima |
| Caio Vydal | Guilherme Ribeiro Braga |
| Caco Baresi | Investigador Cardoso |

=== Special participations ===
| Ator | Personagem |
|---|---|
| Françoise Forton | Dona Dirce Flores |
| Jacqueline Laurence | Madame Eleonora Durrel |
| Henrique Martins | Senador Érico Feitosa |

=== Supporting cast ===
| Actor | Character |
|---|---|
| Adriana Prado | Heleninha |
| Alexandre Liuzzi | Padre Benedito |
| Alex Nader | Ferrolho |
| Aldo Perrota | Verdureiro |
| Ari Guimas | Esculápio |
| Bruno Miguel | Parachitist |
| Christiano Torreão | Trucker who gives Joca a lift |
| Carol Cavalcanti | Andréia |
| Cristina Pereira | Matilde |
| Eduardo Lassah | Edésio |
| Eliana Ovalle | Juíza |
| Felipe Cardoso | Jairo Portela |
| Gilberto Zangrande | Paramedic |
| Gracindo Júnior | General |
| Guilherme Aranda | Gustavo Queirós |
| Gustavo Ottoni | Quincas |
| Henrique Ramiro | Sérgio Malta |
| Ilya São Paulo | Dr. Brandão |
| Isabella Dionísio | Dália |
| Jorge Pontual | Mateus Menezes |
| Júlio Braga | Chairman of Nicolau's party |
| Marcelo Borghi | Revolucionary unionist |
| Marcelo Escorel | Zé Mário |
| Marcio Navarro | Journalist Navarro |
| Marina Rigueira | Adriana Melo |
| Nelito Reis | Trucker |
| Nícolas Bauer | Monsieur Claudel |
| Pâmela Côto | Rosa |
| Paulo Gorgulho | President of the Republic |
| Perfeito Fortuna | Dr. Ventania |
| Ragi Abib | Arauto |
| Rodrigo Faro | Himself |
| Samir Murad | Jorge |
| Sérgio Monte | Chico |
| Sheila Mello | Vera Magalhães |
| Vitor Morgado | Driver |
