= Skull: The Mask =

2020 slasher film

- Promotional release poster
- Directed by: Armando Fonseca; Kapel Furman
- Written by: Armando Fonseca; Kapel Furman
- Starring: Natallia Rodrigues; Wilton Andrade; Ricardo Gelli; Guta Ruiz; Greta Antoine; Tristan Aronovich; Ivo Müller
- Cinematography: Andre Sigwalt
- Music by: Fernando Arruda
- Production companies: Infravermelho Filmes; Fantaspoa Produções; Boccato Productions
- Distributed by: Raven Banner Entertainment
- Release dates: 22 May 2020 (CFF); 27 May 2021 (Shudder)
- Running time: 90 minutes
- Countries: United States; Brazil
- Language: Portuguese

Skull: The Mask (Portuguese: Skull: A Máscara de Anhangá) is a 2020 Brazilian slasher film written and directed by Armando Fonseca and Kapel Furman. It stars Natallia Rodrigues as a detective investigating the ancient mask of Anhangá—a vassal of a Pre-Columbian era god—who is incarnated and embarks on a sacrificial killing spree. The film is an international co-production of Brazil and the United States.

Skull: The Mask premiered digitally as part of the Chattanooga Film Festival on 22 May 2020. The film is available for streaming on Shudder as of 27 May 2021.

== Cast ==
- Natallia Rodrigues as Beatriz Obdias
- Wilton Andrade as Manco Ramirez
- Ricardo Gelli as Padre Vasco Magno
- Guta Ruiz as Galvani Volta
- Greta Antoine as Lilah
- Tristan Aronovich as Nobuto
- Ivo Müller as Tack Waelder
- Eduardo Semerjian as Herr Schädel
- Che Moais as Pajé Iratinga
- Rurik Jr. as Skull

== Release ==
In 2018, Cinestate acquired the rights to distribute Skull: The Mask in the United States through the Fangoria label.

Skull: The Mask premiered digitally on 22 May 2020 as part of the 7th annual Chattanooga Film Festival. The festival took place online as a virtual event due to the COVID-19 pandemic.

The film was made available for streaming on Shudder on 27 May 2021.

== Reception ==
On review aggregator website Rotten Tomatoes, the film holds an approval rating of 67% based on 24 reviews, with an average rating of 5.9/10.

Meagan Navarro of Bloody Disgusting called the film "a gloriously carnage-fueled horror movie nestled deep within a messy web of entangled plot threads. A lot of it doesn't work, but it's hard to be too upset about a film that brings an insane amount of gore and intriguing new monster mythology to the table." Screen Anarchy's Andrew Mack praised the film's gore as "fantastic" and "top notch", though he noted: "It feels like two separate films were made then there was an attempt to edit them together and make a cohesive whole." Jacob Oller of Paste complimented the film's prop design but criticized its choreography and staging, writing that "Skull: The Mask just isn't shot in a way to fully appreciate the nastiness its creators so clearly enjoy." Nick Allen of RogerEbert.com gave the film a score of one-and-a-half out of four stars, finding faults with its characters, editing, and sound mixing.

Gizmodo's Cheryl Eddy praised the film's special effects, and wrote that the perceived complexity of the film's plot "doesn't detract much from the movie's enjoyability." Drew Tinnin of Dread Central gave the film four-and-a-half out of five stars, calling it "an indie action slasher masterpiece." Both Eddy and Tinnin compared the film's antagonist to Jason Voorhees of the Friday of the 13th franchise, with Tinnin writing that "Brazil may have found their version of Kane Hodder in pro-wrestler Rurik Jr." The Guardian's Phil Hoad gave the film three out of five stars, calling it a "silly, uneven but strangely appealing slasher film that leaves no heart unripped from human thorax." Martin Unsworth of Starburst rated Skull: The Mask four out of four, commending its action scenes, pacing, performances, and special effects. Hope Madden of UK Film Review called it a "throwback exploitation" and said the "film’s opening is its strongest segment, a grainy video portrayal of a 1944 political bloodbath with the goal of enacting an ancient pre-Columbian ritual."
