= Thadeu Matos =

Brazilian actor and singer

- Born: 1990 or 1991 (age 35–36); Rio de Janeiro, Brazil
- Occupations: voice actor; singer
- Years active: 2004–present
- Spouse: Victoria Aguillera

Thadeu Matos (born 1990 or 1991) is a Brazilian voice actor and singer.

== Career ==
Matos was born in Rio de Janeiro in 1991. His only major acting role was in 2004 in the telenovela Senhora do Destino on TV Globo, later dedicating his career to dubbing and acting in theatrical plays. In 2017, he returned to TV acting in a minor role on Apocalipse and another on O Tempo Não Para one year later. He studied acting at the Federal University of the State of Rio de Janeiro.

Matos is known for his roles in voice acting, especially for dubbing the character of Spencer Reid of Criminal Minds and Hughie Campbell of The Boys. His films dubbings include the character of Agent Smith in The Matrix Resurrections (by Jonathan Groff) and Warren Worthington III in X-Men: Apocalypse (by Ben Hardy).

He is married to actress Victoria Aguillera and is a vocal supporter of LGBTQ rights.

== Selected roles ==
Year	Title	Role	Notes
2004–2005	Senhora do Destino	Bruno Ferreira da Silva	
2017–2018	Apocalipse		
2018–2019	O Tempo Não Para		
