= Paixões Proibidas =

Brazilian-Portuguese telenovela

- Genre: Telenovela
- Based on: Doomed Love, Mistérios de Lisboa, and Livro Negro do Padre Dinis by Camilo Castelo Branco
- Opening theme: "Romance da Moreninha" by Alceu Valença
- Country of origin: Brazil; Portugal
- Original language: Portuguese
- No. of seasons: 1
- No. of episodes: 139

Production
- Production companies: Grupo Bandeirantes de Comunicação; Rádio e Televisão de Portugal

Original release
- Network: Rede Bandeirantes
- Release: 14 November 2006 – 8 June 2007
- Network: RTP1
- Release: 9 January 2007 – 2007

Paixões Proibidas (Forbidden Passions) is a Brazilian-Portuguese period telenovela co-produced by Grupo Bandeirantes de Comunicação (Brazil) and Rádio e Televisão de Portugal (Portugal). It aired on Rede Bandeirantes in Brazil from 14 November 2006 to 8 June 2007, lasting 139 episodes, replacing the Mandacaru rerun and being replaced by Dance Dance Dance, while in Portugal its first airing was on 8 January 2007 on RTP1.

Based on three works by Camilo Castelo Branco (Doomed Love, Mistérios de Lisboa and Livro Negro do Padre Dinis), it was adapted by Brazilian writer Aimar Labaki, with collaboration from Fabio Brandi Torres and Mário Viana, directed by Del Rangel, Marcus Coqueiro, Sacha and Virgílio Castelo and general direction from Ignácio Coqueiro and Del Rangel.

The series featured Miguel Thiré, Anna Sophia Folch, Julianne Trevisol, Marcos Breda, Felipe Camargo, Maria Carolina Ribeiro, São José Correia and Suzy Rêgo in the main roles.

== Plot ==
In 1805, in the city of Rio de Janeiro, Simão and Teresa, children of families divided by hatred over the years, fall madly in love, but it is a forbidden passion, which does not have the blessing of parents and siblings, nor the support of society. Furthermore, the two will suffer from the schemes of Mariana, a false friend of Teresa who tries everything to separate the couple and stay with the boy. It is among the rebels, the slaves and the marginalized that Teresa and Simão will find support to fight for this love, experiencing tragedies and adventures.

Alberto de Miranda is a former privateer who made his wealth through piracy, returning to Brazil to lead a new life as a respected businessman and being fought over by Eugênia and Elisa. There is also the story of Father Dinis, a mysterious man with several identities, who devotes his life to helping young and wronged lovers, thus trying to clear the guilt of past mistakes. He also struggles with the love he feels for Antônia Valente, a woman who lives in search of her daughter, who was stolen as a child over twenty years before.

== Cast ==
Actor	Character
Miguel Thiré	Simão de Azevedo
Anna Sophia Folch	Teresa Dias
Julianne Trevisol	Mariana Araújo
Erom Cordeiro	Joaquim Dias
Marcos Breda	Baltazar Guimarães
Felipe Camargo	Alberto de Miranda
Maria Carolina Ribeiro	Eugênia Valente
São José Ribeiro	Elisa de Mandeville
Suzy Rêgo	Antônia Valente
Virgílio Castelo	Padre Dinis
Celso Frateschi	Álvaro de Sousa, Barão de Torres Novas
Graziella Moretto	Ângela de Sousa, Baronesa de Torres Novas
Antônio Grassi	Tadeu Dias
Flávio Galvão	Domingos de Azevedo
Ana Bustorff	Rita de Azevedo
Leonardo Carvalho	Manuel de Azevedo
Leonor Seixas	Adelaide Gusmão
Nuno Pardal	Estevão Gusmão
Bruna Brignol	Ana de Azevedo
Pedro Lamares	Mateus Correia
Bruno Gradim	Pedro de Sousa
Natália Luiza	Maria Júlia Queirós
Carlos Vieira	Arthur de Mandeville
Ana Kutner	Emília Salgado
Igor Kovalewsky	Carlos Salgado
Lafayette Galvão	Frei Adriano
Michel Bercovitch	Samuel Goldberg
Reynaldo Gonzaga	João Araújo / Capitão do Mato
Dani Ornellas	Rosália da Silva
Adriana Prado	Celine
Ronnie Marruda	José
Vanessa Pascale	Luzia
Iracema Starling	Índia Jacira Guapiá
Edgar Amorim	Aníbal Setúbal
Washington Austin	Zuza da Silva
Caio Vydal	Tabara Guapiá

=== Guest appearances ===
Actor	Character
Henrique Viana	Barão de Saraiva
Júlio Levy	Jacinto
Renato Rocha	Theobaldo
Gabriel Austin	Tiago

== Production ==
After the successful rerun of Mandacaru, originally shown on Rede Manchete, Grupo Bandeirantes de Comunicação (Band) decided to invest in a period telenovela featuring the same artifices: nudity, violence and an exquisite period production. In 2005 Ana Maria Moretzsohn negotiated the production of a telenovela on Band, where Herval Rossano ordered her a period plot involving the books Amor de Perdição, Mistérios de Lisboa e Livro Negro do Padre Dinis, which he had conceived. Ana Maria, however, planned an original contemporary plot and decided to sign with Rede Record, where she produced Luz do Sol, leaving Aimar Labaki in charge of adapting the text from Camilo Castelo Branco's works.

In February 2006, Herval broke his contract with Band due to dissatisfaction with working conditions, since he had promised a total restructuring of the network's drama unit with the acquisition of cutting-edge equipments and first-line set production, just like what he had promoted with Record two years earlier. With the existing sets and equipment at the network, without changes at the production area, the network continued producing the plot, inviting Ignácio Coqueiro as its director. Originally it was going to be called Amor de Perdição, later Amores Proibidos, before reaching its final title, Paixões Proibidas.

At the same time, the network signed a partnership with the Portuguese network Rádio e Televisão de Portugal (RTP) to coproduce it, including actors from both countries. Outdoor scenes were recorded at Sugarloaf Mountain, Guanabara Bay, historic locales such as the Carioca Aqueduct, Paço Imperial, the National Historical Museum, na Igreja da Glória and at a convent in the center of the state, as well as some locales in Portugal. After two months of production, Del Rangel became the co-director, as critics and the viewers thought it to be slow, making the plot more agile. After its end, the network auctioned off the costumes and scenographic accessories with the money going to Pestalozzi Hospital.

== Airing and ratings ==
=== Brazil ===
Paixões Proibidas premiered on Rede Bandeirantes on 14 November 2006 at 10pm, however on 21 February 2007 it moved to 5:30pm and was re-rated, in order to obtain better ratings by withdrawing its prime time slot disputed by the Big 3 (Globo, SBT and Record), leading to the restriction of several artifices used in the work, such as scenes of sex, action, violence and nudity.

Paixões Proibidas premiered with 5 rating points and peaks of 7, conquering third place. However, after a week, its ratings fell to 2-3 points, ending in fourth place, and, in some places, disputing fifth place with RedeTV!. The move to 5:30pm ended up being catastrophic, the initial plan of improving the ratings ended up with only one point on average. The novela ended with 2.3 rating points, while its general average was 2 points, the worst in the network's drama unit's history.

=== Portugal ===
It premiered on RTP1 on Tuesday 9 January 2007, with an average audience of 12.9% and 28.9% of share, being the third most-watched program of the day.

== Soundtrack ==
1. Romance da moreninha - Alceu Valença (Tema de abertura)
2. Enrosco - Simone (Tema de Simão e Teresa)
3. Joana francesa - Fagner e Chico Buarque (Tema de Alberto e Elisa)
4. Desejos - Fátima Guedes (Tema de Mariana)
5. Coração imprevisto - Eugénia Melo e Castro & Caetano Veloso (Tema de Júlia)
6. Eu não sei quem te perdeu – Pedro Abrunhosa (Tema de Adelaide e Estêvão)
7. Lua Sagrada - Ivan Lins (Tema de Ana de Azevedo)
8. Pétalas - Alceu Valença (Tema de Eugênia)
9. Rosa - Rodrigo Leão (Tema de Ângela de Sousa)
10. Olhos de farol - Ney Matogrosso (Tema de Domingos)
11. Coração Ateu - Lucinha Lins (Tema de Antônia)
12. Antídotos - Ivan Lins (Tema de Padre Dinis)
13. Há uma musica do povo - Mariza (Tema do núcleo de Coimbra)
14. Aceito seu coração - Joanna (Tema de Alberto e Eugênia)
15. Cansei de ilusões - Fafá de Belém (Tema de Álvaro)
16. Lábios de mel - Katia Guerreiro e Ney Matogrosso (Tema de Ana e Mateus)
17. Passos de amador (Fools rush in) - João Bosco (Tema de João Araújo)
18. Trângulo-Mângulo - Gaiteiros de Lisboa (Tema de Fuga)
