= Ivo Müller =

Brazilian actor (born 1977)

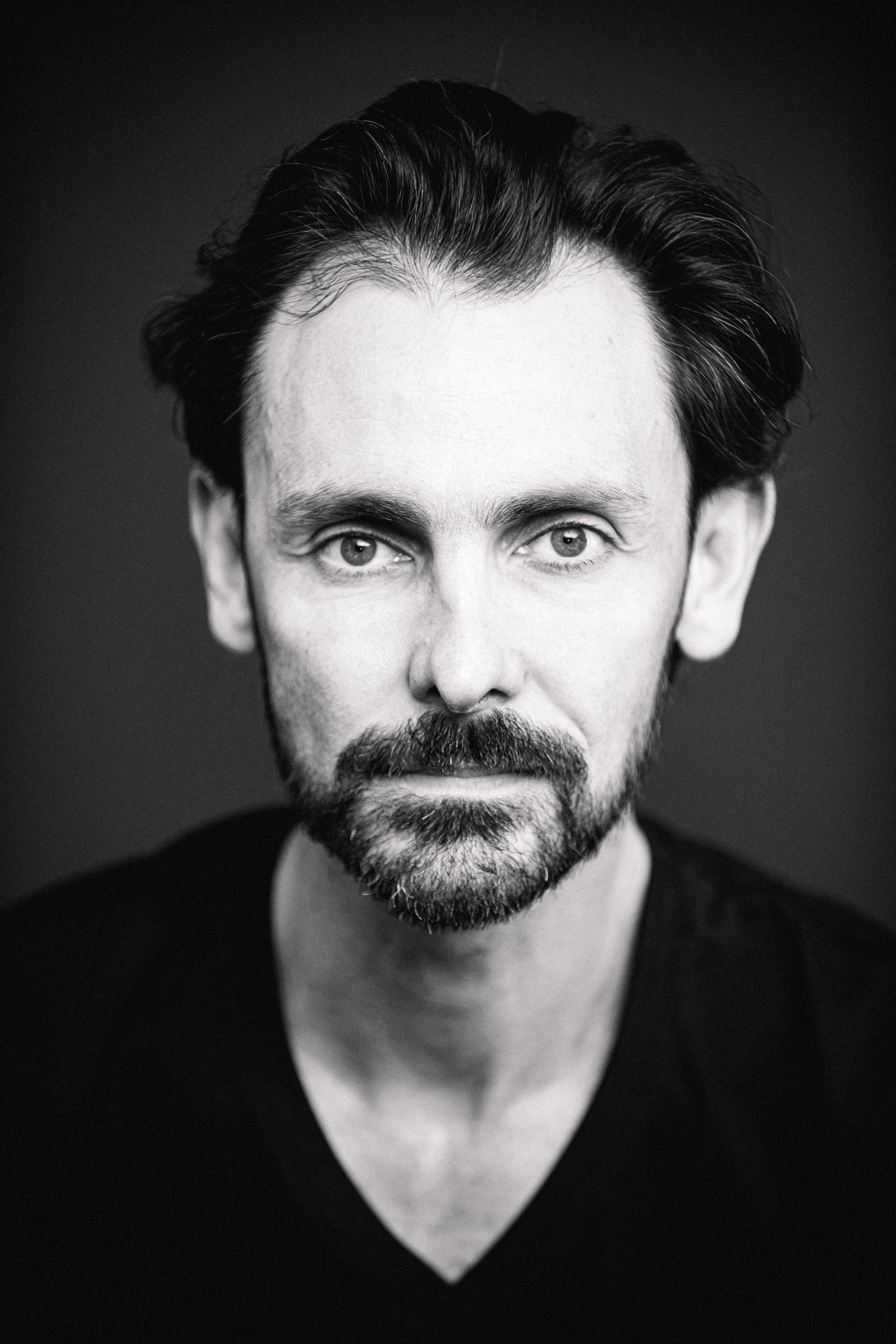
- Müller in 2022
- Born: Ivo Müller Jr; Florianópolis, SC, Brazil
- Occupation: Actor

Ivo Müller (Portuguese pronunciation: [eevo]) is a Brazilian film and stage actor. Müller started his career in short films and school theater, and appeared in the 2012 independent Portuguese film Tabu.

He was born in Florianópolis, Santa Catarina, Brazil. At the age of 15, he received a scholarship to an exchange student program in the United States. His first acting lessons were taken during this experience abroad, when he went to learn English.

== Filmography ==
=== Film ===
Year	Title	Role	Notes	Ref.
2005	Outra Memória			
2012	Tabu	Aurora's husband		
2012	Dictionary		short film	
2014	Lascados	Evangelical priest		
2014	O Tempo Que Leva		short film	
2015	California	Maneco		
2015	O Diabo Mora Aqui			
2015	My Hindu Friend			
2017	The Artificial Humors	Hans	short film	
2017	La Muerte de Marga Maier	Ricardo Reis		
2019	Hebe: A Estrela do Brasil			
2019	Cine Marrocos	Cast coach		
2020	Skull: The Mask			
2020	The Orphan	Carlos	short film	
2021	Bia Plus One			
2022	Proof Sheet	Elio		
2024	Barba Ensopada de Sangue	Marcelo		
2025	Night Stage	Camilo		
2026	Tropical Fractals	Man on Earth		

=== Television ===
Year	Title	Role	Network	Ref.
2009	Mothern		GNT	
2013	A Menina Sem Qualidades		MTV Brasil	
2014	Psi		HBO	
2015	O Negócio		HBO	
2016	Unidade Básica		Universal Channel	
2017	The Great Journey		TV Cultura	
2019	Hebe	Carlucho	Globoplay	
2021	Passport to Freedom		Sony Pictures Television	

=== Stage ===
Year	Title	Role	Notes	Ref.
2005	Retratos e Canções		by Renato Andrade	
2005	Hecuba		by Euripides	
2005	Camaradagem		by August Strindberg	
2006	The Widows		by Arthur Azevedo directed by Sandra Corveloni/Grupo Tapa	
2006	Amargo Siciliano		by Luigi Pirandello directed by Eduardo Tolentino de Araújo	
2010/2013	Letters to a Young Poet		Based on Rainer Maria Rilke Adapted and directed by Ivo Müller	
2017	Huis Clos		by Jean Paul Sartre	
2010/2018	Twelve Angry Men		by Reginald Rose 2010 APCA Prize - Best Play	
2018/2019	Rilke		by poet Rainer Maria Rilke	
2025	Rilke, One Million Words		written, produced and performed by Ivo Müller directed by Arieta Correa	

== Awards and nominations ==
=== Film ===
Year	Awards	Category	Recipient	Outcome
2013	CinEuphoria Awards	Best Ensemble	Tabu	Won
2016	Film Quest	Best Supporting Actor	O Diabo Mora Aqui	Nominated
2016	Cinefantasy International Fantastic Film Festival	Best Actor - Villain	O Diabo Mora Aqui	Won
