= Liliana Castro =

Ecuadorian-born Brazilian actress

Liliana De Castro
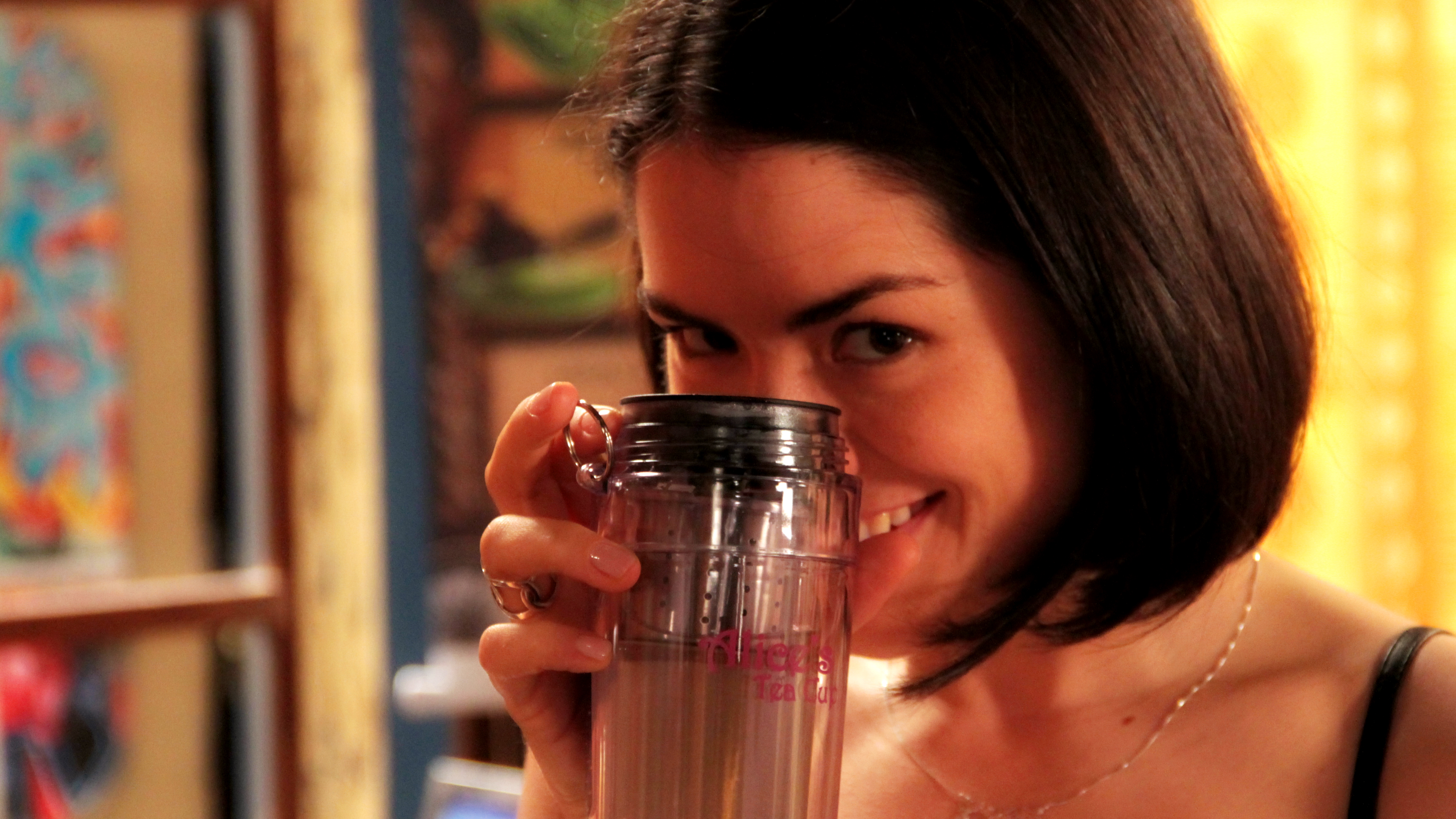
- Liliana Castro (2011)
- Born: Liliana Rezende de Castro; 29 June 1979 (age 46); Quito, Ecuador
- Occupation: Actress
- Years active: 1999–present

Liliana Rezende de Castro (born 29 June 1979) is an Ecuadorian-born Brazilian actress.

== Life ==
Castro was born in Quito, the capital of Ecuador where her father was a diplomat. Her family also lived in Italy and Venezuela, before relocating to Brazil. She began acting at ten years old, and graduated in theatre. Her first professional acting role came in 1999 in the play As Fúrias. Currently, she is also a teaching assistant at Socratica, a non-profit teaching organisation.

== Filmography ==
- 2008: Pseudociese – Teresa
- 2007: Podecrer! – Silvinha
- 2006: O Ano em Que Meus Pais Saíram de Férias – Irene
- 2006: Una Vida Sin Sorpresas – Marina

== TV work ==
- 2017: PSI – Maria Clara (HBO)
- 2014: Só Garotas – Olivia (Multishow)
- 2012: Fora de Controle – Virgínia (Rede Record)
- 2010: Ribeirão do Tempo – Filomena Miranda Durrel (Rede Record)
- 2008: Os Mutantes - Caminhos do Coração – Janete (Rede Record)
- 2007: Mandrake – Marcinha (HBO)
- 2007: Caminhos do Coração – Janete Mendes Martinelli (Rede Record)
- 2005: Alma Gêmea – Luna (Rede Globo)
- 2004: Da Cor do Pecado – Olívia (Rede Globo)
- 2002: Sabor da Paixão – Laiza (Rede Globo)
- 2002: Ilha Rá-Tim-Bum – Polca (TV Cultura)
- 1999: Força de um Desejo – Ana (cameo) (Rede Globo)

== Theatre work ==
- 2007: Por Uma Vida Um Pouco Menos Ordinária – Natália
- 2006: Não Existem Níveis Seguros Para Consumo Destas Substâncias – Beatriz
- 2006: Toda Nudez Será Castigada – Geni
- 2005: Tudo É Permitido – Nina
- 2003: Casca de Nóz – Pberbit
- 2000: Sob o Sol Em Meu Leito Após a Água – Alícia
- 1999/2005: Alice Através do Espelho – Alice
- 1999: As Fúrias – Altea
