= O Doutrinador =

Brazilian comic book series

Publication information
- Publisher: Universo Guará
- Genre: Action; Crime

Creative team
- Written by: Luciano Cunha; Marcelo Yuka; Gabriel Waner
- Artist: Luciano Cunha

O Doutrinador (English: The Awakener) is a Brazilian comic book series created by Luciano Cunha. The main character, "Doutrinador" is a vigilante who aims to kill corrupt politicians who are harming Brazilian society.

== Publication history ==
The comics were first conceived by Luciano Cunha in 2008, but only in 2013 the project begun to be developed and publicized on social networks. The first independent publication sold out in 2014 and soon after, Luciano teamed up with musician and activist Marcelo Yuka to write a new story called Dark Web.

The English translation was published by Arkhaven Comics and is available as a free webcomic.

== Plot ==
O Doutrinador is a vigilante named Miguel, a highly trained federal agent who lives in a Brazil whose government has been hijacked by a gang of politicians and businessmen. A personal tragedy leads him to select endemic corruption as his greatest enemy. He begins to take revenge upon the political elite in the run up to Brazilian presidential elections, in a no-holds-barred crusade against corruption.

== Publications ==
#	Title	ISBN	Release date	Notes
1	O Doutrinador	ISBN 978-8591662609	2013	
2	O Doutrinador - Dark Web	ISBN 978-8569402015	2015	
3	O Doutrinador - Apocalipse BSB	ISBN 978-8591662616	2016	
4	O Doutrinador - Definitivo	978-65-00-22837-3	2021	
5	O Doutrinador - o Vírus Vermelho	978-65-00-01758-8	2021	

== Adaptations ==
=== Films ===
In 2018, O Doutrinador was released, directed by Gustavo Bonafé.

=== Series ===
The television series O Doutrinador: A Série was released on September 1, 2019, on Space and complements the events of the original film.
