= Neusa Maria Faro =

Brazilian actress (1945–2023)

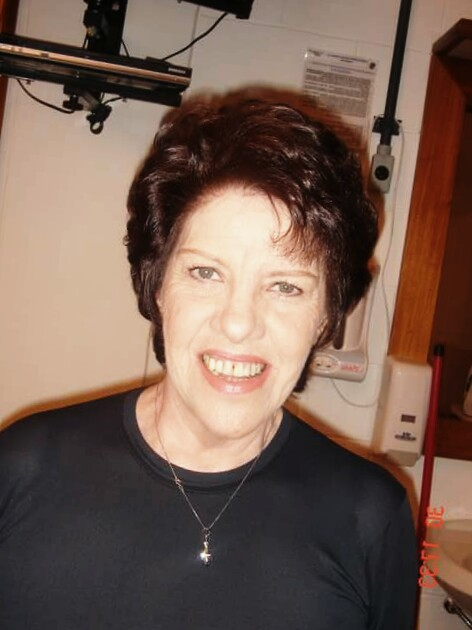
- Born: 18 February 1945; Sorocaba, São Paulo, Brazil
- Died: 7 July 2023 (aged 78); Valinhos, São Paulo, Brazil
- Occupation: Actress

Neusa Maria Faro (18 February 1945 – 7 July 2023) was a Brazilian actress.

Faro was born in Sorocaba on 18 February 1945, and died of thrombosis on 7 July 2023, at the age of 78.

== Television ==
Telenovela and TV series
Year	Title	Role	Notes	Producer
1987	Zillion	Apple	Dubber	Rede Globo
1988–1994	MegaBeast Investigator Juspion	Kilmaza	Dubber	Rede Manchete
1995	A Idade da Loba	Dira		Rede Bandeirantes
1996	Irmã Catarina	Zenáide		CNT
1997	Direito de Vencer	Ana		Rede Record
1997	Chiquititas	Valentina		SBT
1998	Fascinação	Leda		SBT
1998	Torre de Babel	Prisoner		Rede Globo
2001	Amor e Ódio	Gilda		SBT
2002	Pequena Travessa	Abelarda		SBT
2004	Seus Olhos	Giselda		SBT
2005	Alma Gêmea	Divina Santini		Rede Globo
2006	O Profeta	Teodora		Rede Globo
2009	Caras & Bocas	Mercedes		Rede Globo
2010	Cama de Gato	Gioconda		Rede Globo
2011	Morde & Assopra	Palmira		Rede Globo
2011	A Vida da Gente	Dolores		Rede Globo
2012	Gabriela	Arminda		Rede Globo
2013	Amor à Vida	Maria Cecília Esteves "Ciça"		Rede Globo
2015	Verdades Secretas	Elisabeth Menezes		Rede Globo
2016	Êta Mundo Bom!	Margarida		Rede Globo

== Cinema ==
Dubbing, feature film and short film
Year	Title	Role	Notes
1989	Quase Tudo		Short Film
1990	A Idade da Razão		Short Film
1990	A Inúltil Morte de S. Lira		Short Film
1993	Helena		Voice (Short Film)
2003	Sete Minutos	bystander	Short Film
2006	5 Mentiras	Dona Cachorrona	Short Film
2006	Canta Maria	Aunt of Maria	Special Participation
2011	Família Vende Tudo	Rosário	
2018	O Segredo de Davi	Maria	
