= Alma Gêmea =

Brazilian telenovela

- Also known as: Soul Mate
- Genre: Telenovela
- Created by: Walcyr Carrasco
- Written by: Thelma Guedes
- Directed by: Jorge Fernando
- Starring: Eduardo Moscovis; Priscila Fantin; Flávia Alessandra; Liliana Castro; Sidney Sampaio; Bia Seidl; Elizabeth Savalla; Ana Lúcia Torre; Walderez de Barros; Michel Bercovitch; Drica Moraes; Luigi Baricelli; Cecília Dassi; Neusa Maria Faro; Fúlvio Stefanini
- Theme music composer: Peninha
- Opening theme: "Alma Gêmea" by Fábio Júnior
- Country of origin: Brazil
- Original language: Portuguese
- No. of episodes: 227

Production
- Production locations: Rio de Janeiro, Brazil
- Camera setup: Multi-camera
- Running time: 50 minutes

Original release
- Network: Globo
- Release: 20 June 2005 – 10 March 2006

Alma Gêmea (English: Soul Mate) is a Brazilian telenovela produced and aired by TV Globo from 20 June 2005 to 10 March 2006, in 227 episodes, replacing Como uma Onda and being replaced by Sinhá Moça. Written by Walcyr Carrasco, in collaboration with Thelma Guedes, directed by Fred Mayrink and Pedro Vasconcelos and general direction and core direction by Jorge Fernando.

In the main roles had Eduardo Moscovis, Priscila Fantin, Flávia Alessandra, Liliana Castro, Sidney Sampaio, Bia Seidl, Elizabeth Savalla and Ana Lúcia Torre.

== Production ==
Before the recording began, the telenovela cast and crew attended lectures with anthropologist Giovani José da Silva and Carlos Eduardo Sarmento, professor at the Getulio Vargas Foundation, respectively on indigenous culture and socioeconomic, cultural and political customs of the 1940s. In addition, the anthropologist gave indigenous language classes to Priscila Fantin, André Gonçalves, Francisco Carvalho, Maria Silvia, Julia Lemmertz and Thaíssa Ribeiro. These actors also had the guidance of prosody researcher Íris Gomes da Costa. Fernanda Souza, Emilio Orciollo Netto and Emiliano Queiroz took classes in redneck prosody with Silvia Nobre. Marcelo Barros gained notions of northeastern prosody. Liliana Castro took piano lessons from Claudia Castelo Branco and learned ballet steps from Cissa Rondinelli. Eduardo Moscovis went to Roselândia, in Cotia, São Paulo, to know the techniques of grafting and planting roses – on site there are over 300 species of rose bushes. Malvino Salvador trained in São Paulo restaurants the handling of culinary utensils and the manufacture of bread. To give life to villain Cristina, actress Flávia Alessandra watched horror, suspense, obsession and madness movies, looking for inspiration to compose the various stages of the character. The actress also dispensed with body double in the most difficult scenes. Alexandre Barillari visited Ary Franco Prison (Portuguese: Presídio Ary Franco) in Rio de Janeiro, where he talked with detainees to help with the composition of the villain Guto.

=== Scenography ===
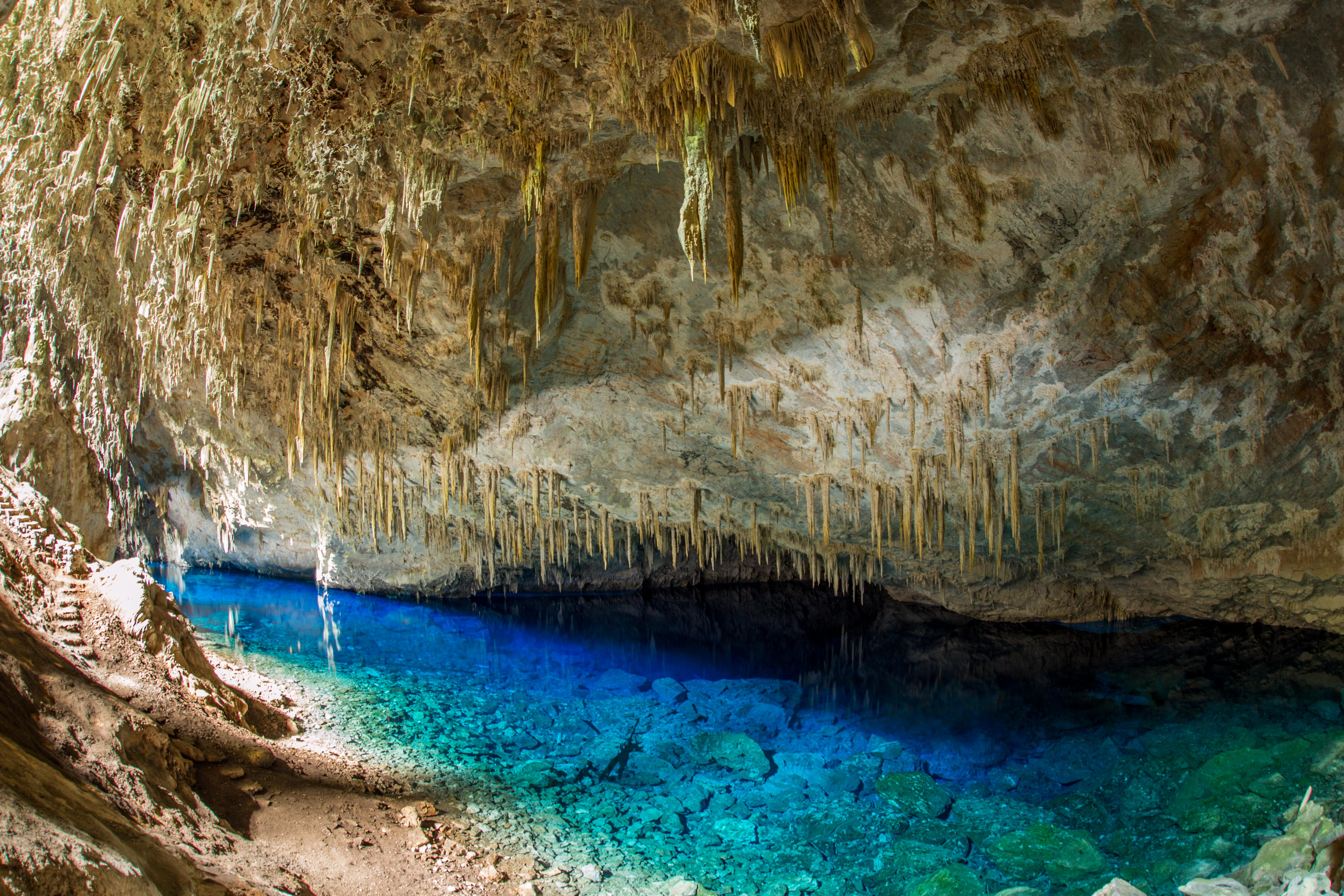
The telenovela had scenes recorded in the Gruta do Lago Azul, in Bonito, Mato Grosso do Sul.

Serena's scenes in the indigenous community – including her birth, her mother's death, her growth, the invasion and destruction of the village, until her departure to São Paulo – were filmed in locations such as Bonito, in Mato Grosso do Sul, Carrancas, in Minas Gerais, and the Camorim neighborhood, in Rio de Janeiro. In Bonito, the production of about 70 professionals was assisted by firefighters, army personnel and an abseiling team to transport the equipment. In Camorim, a scenographic village was built, basically made of straw and wood, with 13 ocas. There were scenes of the prospectors' invasion and the fire, which were attended by 80 background actors. Pieces of the village were used in the engravings in Bonito and Carrancas. The first recordings in São Paulo included scenes of Serena passing through historical sites of the city, such as Estação Júlio Prestes, Pinacoteca do Estado, Museu do Ipiranga and the São Paulo Cathedral, as well as scenes in the Vila dos Ingleses with about 20 extras actors.

The cinematic city of Roseiral built at Estúdios Globo (formerly Projac) was inspired by various locations, including São Paulo and Rio de Janeiro. Also used as references were cities in the interior of São Paulo, such as Bernardino de Campos and the hydromineral estancia Águas de Santa Barbara; and municipalities of Paraná, such as Castro, Morretes, Antonina and Lapa. Raised in an area of 9,000 square meters, Roseiral houses the houses of Rafael and Agnes, the residential building of Vera, the village of the Divina pension, as well as church, flower shop, pharmacy, train station, barber shop, grocery store, city hall, cinema, ice cream shop, doctor's office and shoemaker, some with inland. The greenhouse, one of the relevant scenarios of the telenovela, gained an outside in the scenographic city and inland in studio. This was one of the most laborious environments due to the maintenance of roses. The flowers had to be kept in a refrigerator at a temperature between eight and 12 degrees and could not be in stuffy places. Artificial roses were mixed with natural roses to make up the scenery.

=== Costume and characterization ===
The 1920s of the telenovela were characterized by straight-cut, waist-free costumes and flattened busts for women, and narrow, waist-length clothing with a tight-fitting trouser neck and a bowler hat for men. In the 1940s, the tone of Italian comedies of the early 1950s followed, with references, among others, to films by Italian filmmaker Federico Fellini. One of the highlights is Cristina, who used the colors red, purple and wine a lot, as a typical cartoon villain. Also had repercussion the composition of the character Kátia, by Rita Guedes, a mix of actresses Veronica Lake, Lana Turner and Rita Hayworth, and also the character Jessica Rabbit from the film Who Framed Roger Rabbit. The biggest difficulty encountered by the makeup team was the characterization of the Indians.

A special waterproof makeup was commissioned to make the painting resist the sweat of the recordings. Priscila Fantin had to darken her hair and straighten it every day. In the scenographic city, the actresses wore half wigs to differentiate between the two stages of the telenovela. Nicette Bruno and Walderez de Barros wore a gray wig in the 1940s.

=== Plagiarism accusations ===
In October 2005, Walcyr was accused of plagiarism by writer Carlos de Andrade, author of the book Chuva de Novembro. He filed a lawsuit demanding 10% of the telenovela's revenue and claiming it was a plagiarism of his book. Chuva de Novembro tells the story of musician Caio, who falls in love with Caressa, who gives a yellow rose. Cousin Regina becomes jealous and devises a plan to kill Caressa, making Caio live a lonely life. In the telenovela, the characters would be Rafael, Luna and Cristina. A while later, writer Shirley Costa also accused Walcyr Carrasco of plagiarism; According to her, some details of scenes and the history of the telenovela were copied from her book Rosácea. The writer assured that the book came to the author. A first report confirmed the plagiarism action. In April 2009, Carrasco was acquitted of the charge. The expert identified 185 points in common in both works, but claimed that he could not claim to be plagiarism. In September of the same year, a few days after the telenovela began to be redisplayed, the writer appealed the decision and the process was reopened. However, in January 2010, the plaintiff was again acquitted by the court. The judge concluded that "there was no plagiarism, since the comparative texts do not have identity points, original plot characteristics or creative technique." He further says that "similar points can be found in several other works such as Greek mythology, troubadour novels, Nibelung tales and children's literature.

== Plot ==
The love story between Luna, a beautiful ballerina, and the botanist Rafael, who meet at church and who is envied by Cristina, who in addition to wanting Rafael's love, covets the family jewels gained by Luna, claiming that she is the most old to be the true owner. With the help of Guto, her admirer, Cristina steals her cousin's jewelry on the day of her ballet performance. With a shot in the chest; Luna dies in Rafael's arms and upon hearing his call, she's reborn as Serena; a young indigenous girl who always dreamed of the White rose created by Rafael and that will lead her to the city of Roseiral back to her lover, her old home and her old family.

At first sight, no one in the city believes Serena, the new employee is the reincarnation of the delicate Luna; and the "wild" girl will have to prove that she is Luna; even with Cristina's schemes, who does everything; to separate her from Rafael, her Soulmate again.

== Cast ==
Actor	Character
Priscila Fantin	Serena Anauê / Luna Ávilla Blanco Dias
Eduardo Moscovis	Rafael de Souza Dias
Flávia Alessandra	Cristina Ávilla Saboya Dias
Ana Lúcia Torre	Débora Ávilla Saboya
Alexandre Barillari	Augusto Casali (Guto)
Drica Moraes	Olívia Médici Siqueira
Malvino Salvador	Vitório Santini
Luigi Baricelli	Raul de Carvalho Siqueira
Fernanda Souza	Mirna Gonçalves da Silva
Emílio Orciollo Netto	Crispim Gonçalves da Silva
Cecília Dassi	Mirella de Médici Siqueira
Sidney Sampaio	Felipe Ávilla Blanco Dias
Kayky Brito	Gumercindo Parreira
Fernanda Machado	Dalila Santini
Rodrigo Phavanello	Roberval Silvério / Roberval Albuquerque
Nívea Stelmann	Alexandra Montenegro
Ângelo Antônio	Dr. Eduardo Montenegro
Bia Seidl	Vera Souza Dias
Marcelo Faria	Jorge Amadeu
Elizabeth Savalla	Agnes Ávilla Blanco
Walderez de Barros	Adelaide Ávilla
Neusa Maria Faro	Divina Santini
Fúlvio Stefanini	Osvaldo Santini
Nicette Bruno	Ofélia Santini
Rita Guedes	Kátia Dantas
Felipe Camargo	Dr. Julian Enke
Bruna di Tullio	Madalena
Erik Marmo	Hélio Santini
Aisha Jambo	Sabine Bel-Lac
Tammy Di Calafiori	Nina Santini
Andréa Avancini	Terezinha
Lady Francisco	Generosa
Marcelo Barros	Alaor
Thiago Luciano	Ivan dos Santos
Carla Daniel	Zulmira dos Santos
Ernesto Piccolo	Eurico
Emiliano Queiroz	Bernardo dos Santos (Tio Nardo)
Umberto Magnani	Elias
Rosane Gofman	Nair
Keruse Bongiolo	Judith
Michel Bercovitch	Ciro
Ronnie Marruda	Abílio Pedreira
Mariah da Penha	Clarice Pedreira
Hilda Rebello	Dona Filó
David Lucas	Terê Dias
Renan Ribeiro	Carlito de Médici Siqueira
Pamella Rodrigues	Paulina Pedreira
Caroline Smith	Ritinha

=== Special guests ===
Actor	Character
Liliana Castro	Luna Ávilla Blanco Dias
André Gonçalves	José Aristides Anauê
Rodrigo Faro	Zacarias
Luiz Gustavo	Romeu Albuquerque
Betty Faria	Marielza
Júlia Lemmertz	Professora Cleyde
Othon Bastos	Padre Álvaro
Louise Cardoso	Doralice
Thaíssa Carvalho	Aliena Anauê
Luciana Rigueira	Jacira Anauê
Marcos Suchara	Josias Anauê
Maria Silvia	Jaçuí Anuê
Alexandre Zacchia	Percival
Carolyna Aguiar	Mafalda
Carvalhinho	Padre
Castro Gonzaga	Marcelino
Daniel Barcellos	Dr. Ermelino
Duse Nacaratti	Feiticeira
Francisco Carvalho	Pajé José Anauê
Fred Mayrink	Cantor do Clube da Cidade de Roseiral
Ilva Niño	Almerinda
Jaime Leibovitch	Juíz
Carlos Gregório	Sr. Rodriguez
Luciano Vianna	Xavier
Jorge Cherques	Psiquiatra de Alexandra
Jorge Fernando	Papai Noel
José Augusto Branco	Argemiro
Júlio Braga	Contador de Dr. Santos
Mário Cardoso	Dr. Santos (Rafael's lawyer)
Maurício Machado	Baltazar Alvarim
Nina de Pádua	Eliete
Roberto Bataglin	Dr. Pandolfo
Ana Beatriz Braga	Serena (child)
Victor Hugo Cugula	José Aristides (child)
Haylton Faria	Delegado
Rômulo Medeiros	Padre
Adilson Girardi	Guarda

== Soundtrack ==
Alma Gêmea soundtrack has been released on two albums. The first album Alma Gêmea - Nacional, which contains 16 tracks, brings together songs in Portuguese language. Already in the second album (the international version) contains 14 tracks in various languages. The songs usually have a theme character in the telenovela.

=== Nacional ===
Alma Gêmea - Nacional

Soundtrack album by Various artists
- Released: 2005
- Genre: Various
- Language: Portuguese
- Label: Som Livre

==== Track list ====
1. "Índia" – Roberto Carlos
2. "Quem sabe isso quer dizer amor "– Milton Nascimento
3. "Um Segredo e um Amor" – Sandy
4. "Margarida" – Roupa Nova
5. "Alma Gêmea" – Fábio Júnior
6. "Eterno Amor (True Love)" – Cídia e Daniel
7. "Uma vez mais" – Ivo Pessoa
8. "Diz nos meus olhos (Inclemência)" – Zélia Duncan
9. "Eu não existo sem você" – Maria Bethânia
10. "Linda flor (Yayá) (AI, YOUO)" – Gal Costa
11. "A Vida que a gente leva" – Leila Pinheiro
12. "Estrada do Sertão" – Elba Ramalho
13. "Todo seu querer" – Raimundo Fagner
14. "Um Sonho de Verão (Moonlight Serenade)" – Jussara Silveira
15. "Acidente de Amor" – Gino & Geno
16. "Suíte dos Índios" – Mú Carvalho

=== Internacional ===
Alma Gêmea - Internacional

Soundtrack album by Various artists
- Released: 2005
- Genre: Various
- Languages: English; French; Italian; Spanish
- Label: Som Livre

==== Track list ====
1. "My Funny Valentine" – Rod Stewart
2. "Moonlight Serenade" – Carly Simon
3. "Mr. Lonely" – Fabianno
4. "La Vie En Rose" – Strings Orchestra
5. "Amapola" – The Royal Philharmonic Orchestra
6. "Al Di Là" – Paolo
7. "Fly Me to the Moon (In Other Words)" – Peter Jones
8. "Blue Moon" – SNZ
9. "Misty" – Ivo Pessoa
10. "The Lovers (Prelude)" – John K. Steffen
11. "At Last" – Kenny G featuring Arturo Sandoval
12. "Sway (Quien Será)" – Dean Martin
13. "Frenesí" – Montserrat (Comic scenes' theme)
14. "Mambo Nº8" – Mambo Project

== International transmission ==
Alma Gêmea premiered on Portuguese broadcaster SIC about a month after its debut on TV Globo. In 2007, TV Globo Internacional announced the signing of a contract with Pappas Telecasting – a network of local stations in the western United States – to broadcast the telenovela. Unpublished in the United States, the telenovela began to be broadcast in the country, in Hispanic version, from July 2, at 7 pm. On 13 August 2007, the telenovela premiered in Costa Rica, aired by the Teletica channel. Successful in the international market, the telenovela was shown in countries such as Russia, Peru and Venezuela.
