= Natália Lage =

Brazilian actress and television presenter

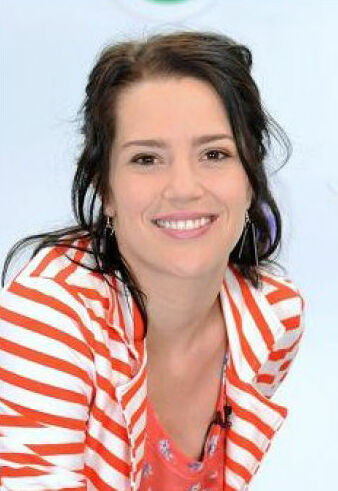
- Lage in 2013
- Born: Natália Lage Vianna Soares; October 30, 1978 (age 47); Niterói, Rio de Janeiro, Brazil
- Occupations: Actress; television presenter
- Spouse: Rodrigo Lages (m. 2013; div. 2018)

Natália Lage Vianna Soares (born 30 October 1978) is a Brazilian actress and television presenter.

== Career ==
At the age of four years, Natália Lage appeared in several commercials.

Natalia Lage has acted in telenovelas since the age of eleven - when she premiered in O Salvador da Pátria. She starred in the telenovela O Amor Está no Ar in 1997. This was followed by appearances in A Padroeira, Kubanacan and Da Cor do Pecado.

In the theater, she staged many shows as Zastrozzi, assembly Selton Mello and Daniel Herz text to Canadian George Walker, Orlando with the text of Virginia Woolf toward Bia Lessa and Eu Nunca Disse que Prestava with a text by Adriana Falcão and Lu Pessanha, directed by Rodrigo Penna.

She appeared in the films O Homem do Ano, adaptation of José Henrique Fonseca, for The Romance O Matador, by Patrícia Melo. She also appeared in the cast of 2 Filhos de Francisco and Xuxa e o Tesouro da Cidade Perdida.

When the show was Theatre Quando Se é Alguém based on the text by Luigi Pirandello (1867–1936) translated by the director and researcher Martha Ribeiro. In 2010, the cast of the film Como Esquecer playing Lisa, that same year she was in the theater with the play Comédia Russa, written by Pedro Brício and Directed by João Fonseca.

Natália was part of the cast of the sitcom A Grande Família, in 2011 she leaves the cast of the show. Currently part of the cast of the show Tapas & Beijos, playing dancer Lucilene.

In 2013, the comedy is Vai que Dá Certo, who has the cast Gregório Duvivier, Bruno Mazzeo, Fábio Porchat, Danton Mello, among others.

== Personal life ==
Lage began dating the screenwriter Rodrigo Lages in 2006, marrying him in 2013. The two separated in 2018.

== Filmography ==
=== Television ===
Year	Title	Role	Notes
1988	Tarcísio e Glória	Mariana	
1989	O Salvador da Pátria	Regina Matos	
1990	Gente Fina	Tatiana Azevedo Paiva (Tatá)	
1992	Perigosas Peruas	Andréa Falcão Belotto (Tuca)	
1992	Você Decide	Cíntia	Episode: "Antes Que o Amor Acabe"
1992	Você Decide	Júlia	Episode: "Mentiras de Amor"
1993	O Mapa da Mina	Beatriz Amaral (Bia)	
1994	Você Decide	Cibele	Episode: "Cinderela"
1994	Tropicaliente	Ana Carolina Botelho (Adrenalina)	
1995	Cara & Coroa	Erika Villar Matos (Kika)	
1997	O Amor Está no Ar	Luísa Schneider Souza Carvalho Uchôa	
1998	Mulher	Tetê	Episode: "O Princípio de Tudo"
1998	Você Decide	Laura	Episode: "Ligeiramente Grávida"
1998	Malhação	Marina Grenato	Seasons 5–7 (1998–2001)
2002	A Padroeira	Ana	Episodes: "February 13–14, 2002"
2002	A Grande Família	Carina	Episode: "O Sétimo Silva"
2003	Retrato Falado	Irani	Episode: "Dona Beraldina"
2003	Kubanacan	Frida	Episode: "September 15, 2003"
2004	Sob Nova Direção	Zoraide	Episode: "O Casamento do Meu Melhor Inimigo"
2004	Da Cor do Pecado	Roxane	Episodes: "May 3–17, 2004"
2005	A Lua Me Disse	Beatriz Nogueira Queiroz	
2006	Sitcom.br	Natália	Episode: "Romance"
2006	Linha Direta Justiça	Catharine Palse	Episode: "Os Crimes da Rua do Arvoredo"
2006	A Diarista	Dani	Episode: "Luz, Câmera... Inanição!"
2006	Retrato Falado	Naty	Special of the Fantástico
2006	Pé na Jaca	Cecília	Episodes: "November 22–30, 2006"
2007	A Grande Família	Gina	Seasons 7–11 (2007—2011)
2012	Louco por Elas	Luana	Episode: "Ex-namoradas de Léo Se Reúnem"
2012	Tapas & Beijos	Lucilene	Seasons 2–5 (2012–2015)
2013	Revista do Cinema Brasileiro	Presenter	2013–2016
2016	Os Suburbanos	Samira	Season 2
2016	Tempero Secreto	Cristina de Bragança (Tita)	
2016	Segredos de Justiça	Cristiane	Episode: "Mais Valem Dois Pais nas Mãos"
2017	Carcereiros	Míriam	Episode: "Mandarim"
2017	Questão de Família	Isabel	Season 3
2017	Sob Pressão	Madalena	Season 1
2017	País Irmão	Branca	
2019	O Doutrinador: A Série	Isabela	
2019	A Divisão	Roberta	
2021	Um Lugar ao Sol	Gabriela	

=== Film ===
Year	Title	Role	Notes
2003	O Homem do Ano	Érica	
2004	Xuxa e o Tesouro da Cidade Perdida	Helena	
2005	2 Filhos de Francisco	Cleide	
2006	O Filme do Filme Roubado do Roubo da Loja de Filmes		
2007	Vendedores		
2010	Como Esquecer	Lisa	
2012	Tomate Cereja	Carol	Short film
2013	Vai que Dá Certo	Jaqueline	
2014	Love Film Festival	Natália	
2015	O Engano	Girl	Short film
2016	Vai que Dá Certo 2	Jaqueline	
2016	Um Homem Só	Cecília	
2018	O Doutrinador	Isabela	

=== Theater ===
- 1991 - Procura-se um Amigo
- 1992 - Namoro
- 1993 - Os Sete Gatinhos
- 1995 - Bonitinha mas Ordinária
- 1995 - Arthur Bispo de Rosário/A Via Sacra dos Contrários
- 1996 - No de Gravata
- 1997 - A Beira do Mar Aberto
- 2001 - Pinóquio
- 2003 - Zastrozzi
- 2004 - Esse Alguém Maravilhoso que Eu amei
- 2005 - Orlando
- 2006 - Do Outro lado da Tarde
- 2006 - Eu Nunca disse que Prestava
- 2009 - Quando se é Alguém
- 2010 - Comédia Russa
- 2011 - Trilhas Sonoras de Amor Perdidas
- 2012 - JT – Um Conto de Fadas Punk
- 2013 - Edukators
- 2016 - Jacqueline
