= A Divisão =

Brazilian crime drama web television series

- Genre: Crime drama
- Directed by: Vicente Amorim
- Starring: Erom Cordeiro; Silvio Guindane; Thelmo Fernandes; Natália Lage; Marcos Palmeira; Oscar Calixto
- Country of origin: Brazil
- Original language: Portuguese
- No. of seasons: 4
- No. of episodes: 40

Production
- Executive producer: Marcelo Torres
- Producer: Jose Junior
- Cinematography: Gustavo Hadba
- Editor: Danilo Lemos
- Production companies: Afroreggae Audiovisual; Globo Filmes; Hungry Man; Multishow

Original release
- Network: Globoplay
- Release: July 19, 2019 – present

A Divisão (transl. The Division) is a Brazilian crime drama web television series that premiered on the streaming service Globoplay on July 19, 2019.

The second season was released on September 10, 2020. The third season was released on September 29, 2023.

== Plot ==
Set in the late 90s, the story accompanies the outbreak of kidnapping that shook the society of Rio de Janeiro and invaded the pages of newspapers in that decade. It then emerges a task force of the police from the Rio anti-kidnapping division, in order to combat the war between criminal factions.

== Cast and characters ==
- Erom Cordeiro as Santiago - a corrupt, dishonest and intelligent investigator of the Civil Police of Rio de Janeiro and a member of the anti-kidnapping division. He's also Mendonça's biggest rival.
- Silvio Guindane as Mendonça - an honest, serious, incorruptible and brutal delegate from the Civil Police of Rio de Janeiro and leader of the anti-kidnapping division. He's also Santiago's biggest rival.
- Thelmo Fernandes as Ramos - an investigator from the Civil Police of Rio de Janeiro and member of the anti-kidnapping division who, like Santiago, is also corrupt. He's also Santiago's best friend
- Natália Lage as Roberta - A Rio de Janeiro Civil Police investigator and member of the anti-kidnapping division who, who, like Santiago, is also corrupt. She's also Benicio's biggest rival.
- Marcos Palmeira as Benício - He is the leader of the Rio de Janeiro anti-kidnapping operation and Mendonça's boss. He's also Roberta biggest rival.
- Oscar Calixto as Wagner

== Release ==
=== Marketing ===
On 10 July 2019, the first trailer for the series was released.
