= Eduardo Moscovis =

Brazilian actor (born 1968)

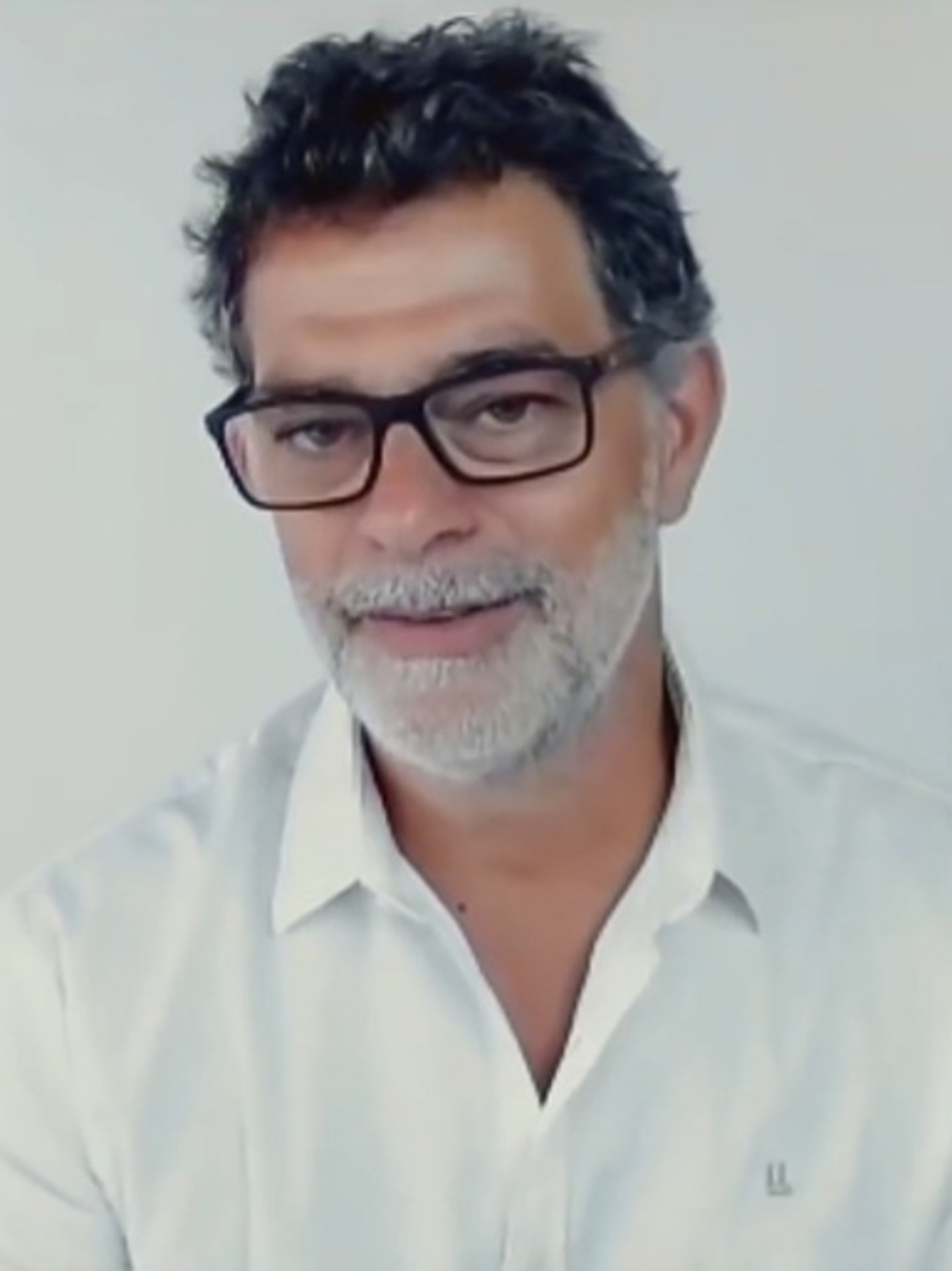
- Moscovis in 2020
- Born: Carlos Eduardo de Andrade; 8 June 1968 (age 57); Rio de Janeiro, Brazil
- Other names: Du Moscovis
- Occupation: Actor
- Years active: 1989–present
- Height: 1.84 m (6 ft 0 in)
- Spouses: Roberta Richard (m. 1995; div. 2002) Cynthia Howlett (m. 2007)
- Children: 4

Carlos Eduardo de Andrade (born 8 June 1968), known professionally as Eduardo Moscovis, is a Brazilian actor.

== Selected filmography ==
- Pedra sobre Pedra (1992)
- Mulheres de Areia (1993)
- As Pupilas do Senhor Reitor (1994)
- Por Amor (1997)
- Pecado Capital (1998)
- O Cravo e a Rosa (2000)
- Desejos de Mulher (2002)
- Kubanacan (2003)
- Senhora do Destino (2004)
- Alma Gêmea (2005)
- Amor em Sampa (2013)
- A Regra do Jogo (2015)
- O Sétimo Guardião (2018)
- O Doutrinador (2018)
- O Doutrinador: A Série (2019)
- Bom Dia, Verônica (2020)
- El Presidente: The Corruption Game (2022)
- No Rancho Fundo (2024)
- Três Graças (2025)
