= O Doutrinador (film) =

2018 film directed by Gustavo Bonafé

- Theatrical release poster
- Directed by: Gustavo Bonafé
- Screenplay by: Luciano Cunha; Gabriel Wainer; Rodrigo Lages; L.G. Bayão; Guilherme Siman
- Based on: O Doutrinador by Luciano Cunha
- Produced by: Sandi Adamiu; Marcio Fraccaroli; Bruno Wainer
- Starring: Kiko Pissolato; Tainá Medina; Samuel de Assis; Nicolas Trevijano; Tuca Andrada; Marília Gabriela; Natallia Rodrigues; Natália Lage; Helena Ranaldi; Eucir de Souza; Lucy Ramos; Eduardo Moscovis; Helena Luz
- Cinematography: Rodrigo Carvalho
- Production companies: Paris Filmes; Space; Universo Guará
- Distributed by: Downtown Filmes; Paris Filmes
- Release date: November 1, 2018
- Country: Brazil
- Language: Portuguese
- Box office: $772,282

O Doutrinador (transl. The Awakener) is a 2018 Brazilian crime thriller film directed by Gustavo Bonafé, based on the homonymous comic series created by Luciano Cunha. The film is written by Gabriel Wainer, Luciano Cunha, L.G. Bayão, Rodrigo Lages and Guilherme Siman, and stars Kiko Pissolato as the title character, alongside Samuel de Assis, Tainá Medina, Nicolas Trevijano, Eduardo Moscovis, Tuca Andrada, Natália Lage, Helena Ranaldi, Eucir de Souza, and Marília Gabriela.

== Plot ==
Miguel (Kiko Pissolato) is a federal agent of the "D.A.E." ("Special Armed Division"), highly trained and expert in weapons. After experiencing a trauma, he leaves for a personal journey of vengeance, and assumes the identity of a masked vigilante. The "Awakener" decides to do justice with his own hands exterminating politicians and businessmen of corrupt construction firms.

Now, his goal is to fight a gang of politicians and bandits who took the lead in Brazilian politics and began to govern the country thinking only of their own interests.

== Cast ==
- Kiko Pissolato as Miguel Montessant / The Awakener
- Tainá Medina as Nina
- Samuel de Assis as Edu
- Nicolas Trevijano as Diogo
- Eucir de Souza as Deputy Djalma Dias
- Marília Gabriela as Minister Marta Regina
- Eduardo Moscovis as Sandro Corrêa
- Carlos Betão as Antero Gomes
- Eduardo Chagas as Oliveira
- Natália Lage as Isabela Montessant
- Tuca Andrada as Tenente Siqueira
- Natallia Rodrigues as Penélope
- Helena Ranaldi as Julia Machado
- Lucy Ramos as Marina Sales
- Helena Luz as Alice Montessant

== Production ==
=== Development ===
In the same year as the publication of the first volume of O Doutrinador it was confirmed a partnership with Paris Filmes and Downtown Filmes to produce a live-action film based on the comic book. In August 2013, the first official teaser was posted on YouTube. Later Cunha and Gabriel Wainer started working on the film's screenplay.

The pre-production of the film began in mid-2017. On April 15, Downtown Filmes officially announced the release of the film during the CCXP Tour Nordeste event that was held in Olinda, Pernambuco.

== Release ==
O Doutrinador was released in Brazil on November 1, 2018. The film was selected to screen at the 2019 Jackie Chan Action Movie Week.
