= Jéssica Sodré =

Brazilian television actress (born 1985)

- Born: July 21, 1985 (age 39); Nilópolis, Rio de Janeiro, Brazil
- Occupation: Actress
- Years active: Since 2004

Jéssica Sodré (born July 21, 1985) is a Brazilian television actress.

== Early life ==
She was born in Nilópolis, Rio de Janeiro, Brazil.

== Career ==
Sodré is best known for her work on telenovelas, including Senhora do Destino and Prova de Amor.
