= Marília Gabriela =

Brazilian journalist, TV host, and actress

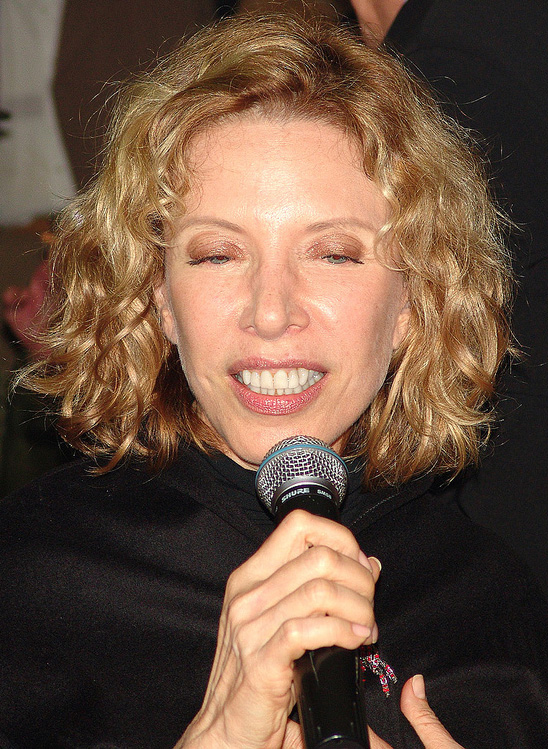
- Marília Gabriela in 2005
- Born: Marília Gabriela Baston de Toledo; 31 May 1948 (age 78); Campinas, São Paulo, Brazil
- Occupations: Journalist; actress; TV host; writer; singer
- Spouses: Reinaldo Haddad (m. 1970; died 1974) Zeca Cochrane (m. 1976; div. 1986) Reynaldo Gianecchini (m. 1999; div. 2006)
- Children: 2

Marília Gabriela Baston de Toledo (born 31 May 1948), best known as Marília Gabriela or just Gabi, is a Brazilian journalist, TV host, actress, writer, and former singer.

== Career ==
=== Television hosting ===
Marília began her journalist career in 1969, as an intern at Rede Globo's Jornal Nacional. That same year she was invited to present the news program Jornal Hoje, in São Paulo. In 1973, she presented the TV show Fantástico, with a story about the anniversary of Carmen Miranda's death. After that she became special reporter for the program. In 1980, Marília became the main host of the program TV Mulher, together with Ney Gonçalves Dias She recorded two albums under Som Livre and Universal Music, named Perdida de Amor, with participations of Simone and Caetano Veloso. After leaving TV Mulher, in 1984, she was TV Globo's correspondent in England for six months, besides doing news stories for Fantástico. Unhappy, she left TV Globo for Rede Bandeirantes. In 1985, she presented the variety shows Marília Gabi Gabriela, at TV Bandeirantes, and the talk show Cara a Cara.

With low ratings, Marília Gabi Gabriela show was canceled, leaving her only with Cara a Cara, on late Sunday nights; from 1987 to 1994 she also presented Jornal Bandeirantes. In 1989 she mediated the first presidential debate between the candidates Luiz Inácio Lula da Silva and Fernando Collor de Mello. After leaving TV Bandeirantes, she signed with Rede CNT for a short period. In 1997, she signed with Sistema Brasileiro de Televisão, where she presented SBT Repórter and talk show De Frente com Gabi. She also had a brief stint at RedeTV!.

=== Acting ===
Gabriela debuted on stages in 2000, with the leading role in Gerald Thomas (theatre director)' play Esperando Beckett,. She also acted in feature films and telenovelas. In the telenovela Senhora do Destino, de Aguinaldo Silva, Marília Gabriela played two characters in different timelines: Josefa Medeiros Duarte Pinto, a journalist, and her daughter, Guilhermina de Medeiros Duarte Pinto Lefevre. After prioritizing her acting career at Rede Globo, and also presenting Marília Gabriela Entrevista on cable channel GNT, she returned to SBT in June 2010, back with De Frente com Gabi. On 6 July 2010 she signed with TV Cultura to present Roda Viva on Mondays, keeping her program on SBT on Sundays. Thus, Marília Gabriela passed to host three programs in three different channels. After a year at TV Cultura, SBT decided for her exclusivity on broadcast television. She left the channel in 2015.

== Personal life ==
Gabriela's first husband was Reinaldo Haddad, whom she married in 1970. In 1972 they had a son, Christiano Cochrane. In 1974 she was widowed. From 1976 until 1986, she was married to Zeca Cochrane, with whom she had her second son, Theodoro Cochrane, an actor. In 1999, after a year of dating, Marília Gabriela married model and actor Reynaldo Gianecchini. On 27 October 2006, it was announced the couple had separated.

== Filmography ==
=== Television ===
==== Acting roles ====
Novelas, Séries & Minisséries
Year	Title	Role	Notes	Channel
2004	Senhora do Destino	Josefa de Medeiros Duarte Pinto/Maria Guilhermina de Medeiros Duarte Pinto Lefevre		Rede Globo
2004	A Diarista	Pérola	Special participation	Rede Globo
2004	Sob Nova Direção	Branca	Special participation	Rede Globo
2006	JK	Celita Bueno Cavallini		Rede Globo
2006	Sob Nova Direção	Rebeca	Special participation	Rede Globo
2007	Duas Caras	Margarida Maria dos Anjos / Margarida McKenzie Salles Prado (Guigui)		Rede Globo
2009	Cinquentinha	Mariana Santoro		Rede Globo
2012	A Vida de Rafinha Bastos	Herself(Episode: Piloto) - web series	Special participation	YouTube
2013	Chiquititas	Herself	Special participation	SBT
2014	Porta dos Fundos	Herself(Episode: De Frente)	Special participation	YouTube
2014	As Canalhas	Celina	GNT	
2016	Adnight	Treinadora de Adnet	Programa de estreia	Rede Globo

==== Presenter ====
Programs
Year	Title	Channel
1980 - 1984	TV Mulher	Rede Globo
1985	Marília Gabi Gabriela	Rede Bandeirantes
1987 - 1995	Cara a Cara	Rede Bandeirantes
1987 - 1992	Jornal Bandeirantes	Rede Bandeirantes
1995 - 1996	Marília Gabi Gabriela	CNT/Gazeta
1995 - 2000	SBT Repórter	SBT
1996	First Class	SBT
1998 - 2015	Marília Gabriela Entrevista	GNT
2000 - 2001	Gabi	RedeTV!
2002 - 2004	De Frente com Gabi	SBT
2010 - 2011	Roda Viva	TV Cultura
2010 - 2015	De Frente com Gabi	SBT
2012	Reviva	Canal Viva
2012	Saturday Night Live	RedeTV!
2013 - 2014	Gabi Quase Proibida	SBT
2016	TV Mulher	Canal Viva

=== Cinema ===
Feature and short films
Year	Title	Role
1997	Ed Mort	Silva
2002	Avassaladoras	Débora
2003	Gregório de Mattos	Abadessa
2004	O Diabo a Quatro	Regina
2005	Quanto Vale ou É por Quilo?	(Indisponível)
2008	Sexo com Amor?	Mônica
2008	Bellini e o Demônio	Letícia
2016	Procurando Dory	Marília Gabriela (dub)
2018	O Doutrinador	Minister Marta Regina

=== Stage ===
Plays
Year	Title
2001	Esperando Beckett
2006	Lady Macbeth
2008	Aquela Mulher
2015	Vanya e Sonia e Masha e Spike

== Book ==
- 2008: Eu Que Amo Tanto (the book got a segment in the TV program Fantástico (Rede Globo), retelling some of its stories)

== Discography ==
=== Albums ===
- 1982: Marília Gabriela

Label- Opus Columbia / Som Livre

- Tracks
1. Diga Ao Povo Que Fico (Rita Lee / Roberto de Carvalho)
2. Bicho de Estimação (Roberto Carlos / Erasmo Carlos)
3. Ser, Fazer e Acontecer (Gonzaguinha)
4. Essas Coisas que Eu Mal Sei (Marina Lima / Antônio Cícero)
5. Sampa (Caetano Veloso)
6. Dois Namorados (Guto Graça Mello / Naila Skorpio)
7. Da Cor do Pecado (Bororó)
8. O Que É, O Que É? (Milton Nascimento / Fernando Brant)
9. Eramos Três (Tunai / Sergio Natureza)
10. Cataclisma (Ivan Lins)
11. Tomara (Caetano Veloso)
- 1984: Marília Gabriela

Label - Som Livre

- Tracks
1. Sampa
2. Da Cor Do Pecado
3. Albatroz
4. Drão
5. Mutante
6. Cataclisma
7. Diga Ao Povo Que Fico
8. O Que É, O Que É
9. Abrir A Porta
10. Espelho
11. Tomara
12. Trem Das Cores
- 2002: Perdida de Amor

Label- Universal Music

- Tracks
1. Fotografia
2. Loira
3. Perdido de Amor
4. Você
5. Marina
6. Este Seu Olhar
7. Nem Eu
8. Inútil Paisagem
9. Alguém Como Tu
10. Copacabana
11. Copacabana Blade Runner
12. Sábado Em Copacabana
