= Detonautas =

Brazilian rock band

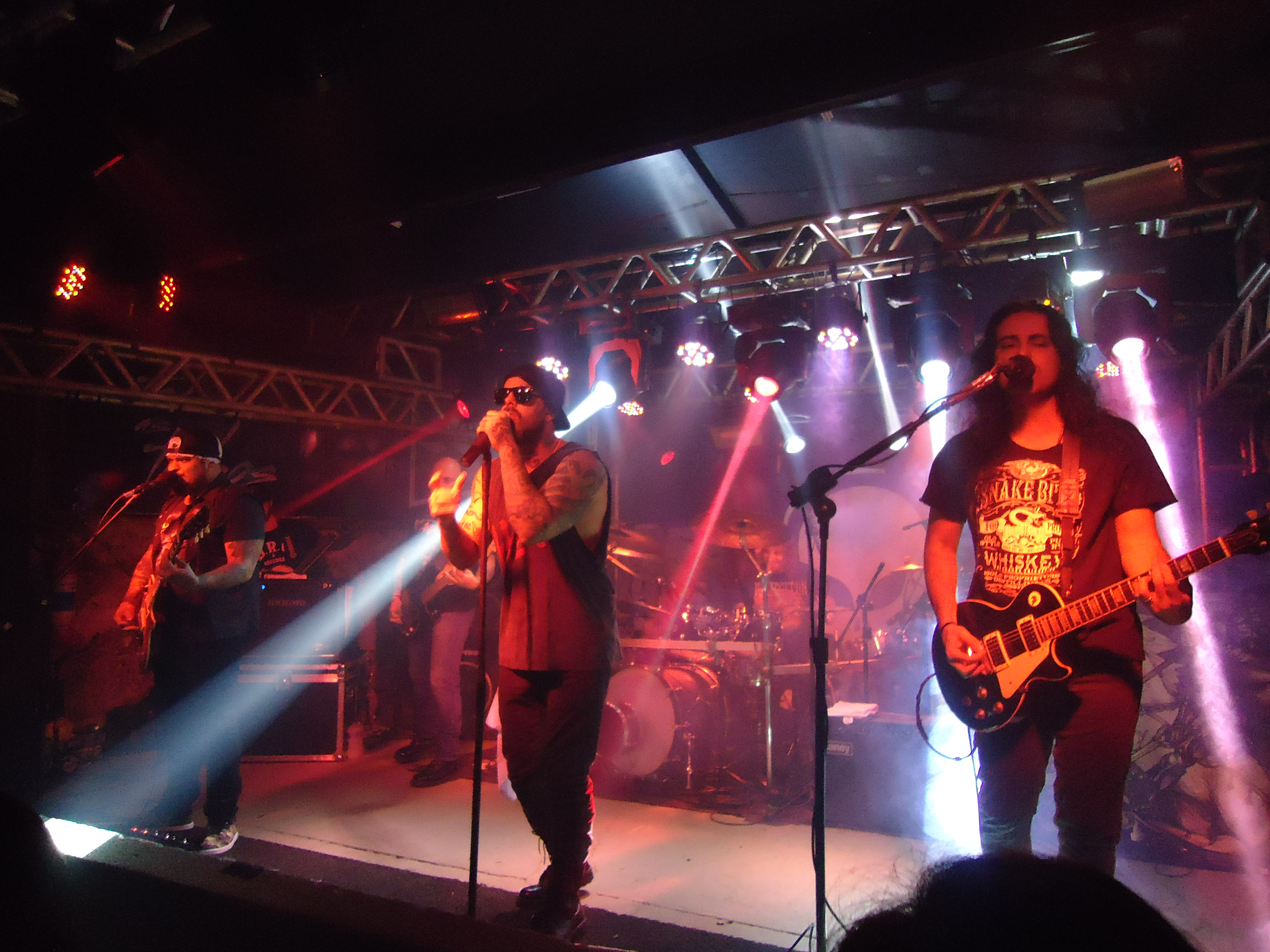
- Detonautas in 2020

Background information
- Origin: Rio de Janeiro, Brazil
- Genres: Alternative rock, pop-punk, pop-rock, electronic rock, nu metal, melodic hardcore, hard rock, post-punk revival
- Years active: 1997 - present
- Labels: WEA, Sony Music
- Members: Tico Santa Cruz; Renato Rocha; Phil Machado; André Macca; Fábio Brasil
- Past members: Rodrigo Netto; Tchello; DJ Cléston
- Website: detonautas.com.br

Detonautas (previously known as Detonautas Roque Clube) is a Brazilian rock band from Rio de Janeiro. Usually the lyrics of their songs relate to violence, political corruption, and love.

== History ==
The history of Detonautas is mixed with the onset of the fever of the Internet in Brazil. In 1997 Tico Santa Cruz appeared in a chatroom asking if anyone had played any instrument, then, Eduardo Simão, who also went to the room, answered and became known by his nickname in chatrooms: Tchello. The singer Tico lived in Copacabana, Rio de Janeiro and Eduardo had a guesthouse in Ilhéus, Bahia.

After the meeting of the two precursors in Rio de Janeiro, the band went through several configurations, until more members were recruited through the Internet. The fact of how the band was formed reflected in its name: Detonadores + Internautas = Detonautas.

Thanks mainly to the insistence of Tico Santa Cruz and the providential help of his friend, Gabriel o Pensador, Detonautas were getting their first hit and after ripening on the road, mixing performances in places of good structure (the band has reached opening for Red Hot Chili Peppers to 50,000 people in Pacaembu) and others less so, but that served to give a chance and experience. After much struggle, including the famous pilgrimage to the demo under his arm, finally a chance: after much back and forth Warner Music Brazil signed the band, remixed and released their self-titled debut album, Detonautas Roque Clube, packed with the singles "Outro Lugar" and "Quando o Sol Se For" was a great national success.

The Detonautas are well known by viewers of MTV Rockgol, the championship of musicians. Were considered good players, with a 3rd place in 2003 (which Tico was the top scorer). Presenters Paulo Bonfa and Marco Bianchi dubbed almost all players, as Koala (Tico), Chainsaw (Tchello), Mane (Renato Rocha), Brasil-sil-sil (Fábio Brasil), The Grandson of Rodrigo (Rodrigo Netto), and the famous DJ "Clééééston", considered veteran by the two biggest ace of the championship.

In 2004, was released their second album, Roque Marciano, who won the first gold of Detonautas. The album contains the hits "O Dia Que Não Terminou", "O Amanhã", "Tênis Roque", "Só Por Hoje", among others. On November 6, Detonautas recorded at Usina Royal, Campinas, their first DVD, Roque Marciano (Ao Vivo), released on the same year.

In 2006, was released their third album, Psicodeliamorsexo&distorção, marked by a heavier sound and a strong presence of voice. The album came packaged with songs like "Não Reclame Mais", "Dia Comum" and "Você Me Faz Tão Bem" considered by many the best success of the group. For the recording of the video, the band was inspired by the movement Free Hugs, made in Australia.

=== Netto's death ===
On June 4, 2006, the 29-year-old guitarist Rodrigo Netto was killed when passing with his car at one of the most important avenues of Rio de Janeiro. The criminals wanted his car. Rodrigo did not react to the assault, and was shot in the chest, dying at the place. With him in the car, there were his grandmother and his brother Rafael da Silva Netto who was also hit by 2 shots, with no serious consequent injuries. According to investigation by the Brazilian Military Police, the order to steal the vehicle came from drug dealers of a nearby hill, and among the criminals there was an underage boy, the gunman at the car.

Tchello, the bassist, has tattooed an image of Rodrigo's face at his back and Tico tattooed Netto's signature on his rib.

=== After Netto's death ===
Two years after the death of guitarist Rodrigo Netto, the band left their label, Warner, and signed a contract with Sony Music. In the same year, they again get in the studio to record their fourth album, O Retorno de Saturno. Unlike the previous album, it contains a lighter and acoustic effect. The album contains songs like "O Retorno de Saturno" and "Verdades do Mundo", a tribute to the deceased friend.

== Band members ==
=== Current members ===
- Tico Santa Cruz – lead vocals (1997–present)
- Renato Rocha – guitar, backing vocals (1997–present)
- Fábio Brasil – drums (2000–present)
- Phil Machado – guitar, backing vocals (2009–present)
- André Macca – bass (2013–present)

=== Former members ===
- Rodrigo Netto – guitar, backing vocals (1999–2006; his death)
- Tchello – bass (1997–2013)
- DJ Cléston – turntables, percussion (2001–2020)

== Discography ==
=== Studio albums ===
- (2002) Detonautas Roque Clube
- (2004) Roque Marciano
- (2006) Psicodeliamorsexo&distorção
- (2008) O Retorno de Saturno
- (2014) A Saga Continua
- (2017) VI
- (2021) Álbum Laranja
- (2022) Esperança

=== Live/video albums ===
- (2005) Roque Marciano (Ao Vivo)
- (2009) Acústico
- (2012) Ao Vivo no Rock in Rio
- (2023) 20 Anos – Acústico

== Awards ==
- VMB 2003 – Winner of the category Best band
- VMB 2004 – Winner of the category Best Website, designed by Marcos Sketch and Ricardo Brautigam
- Laboratório Pop 2006 – National Disc – Psicodeliamorsexo&distorção / Name of the year: Tico Santa Cruz
