= Tico Santa Cruz =

Brazilian musician, singer, songwriter, writer, and activist

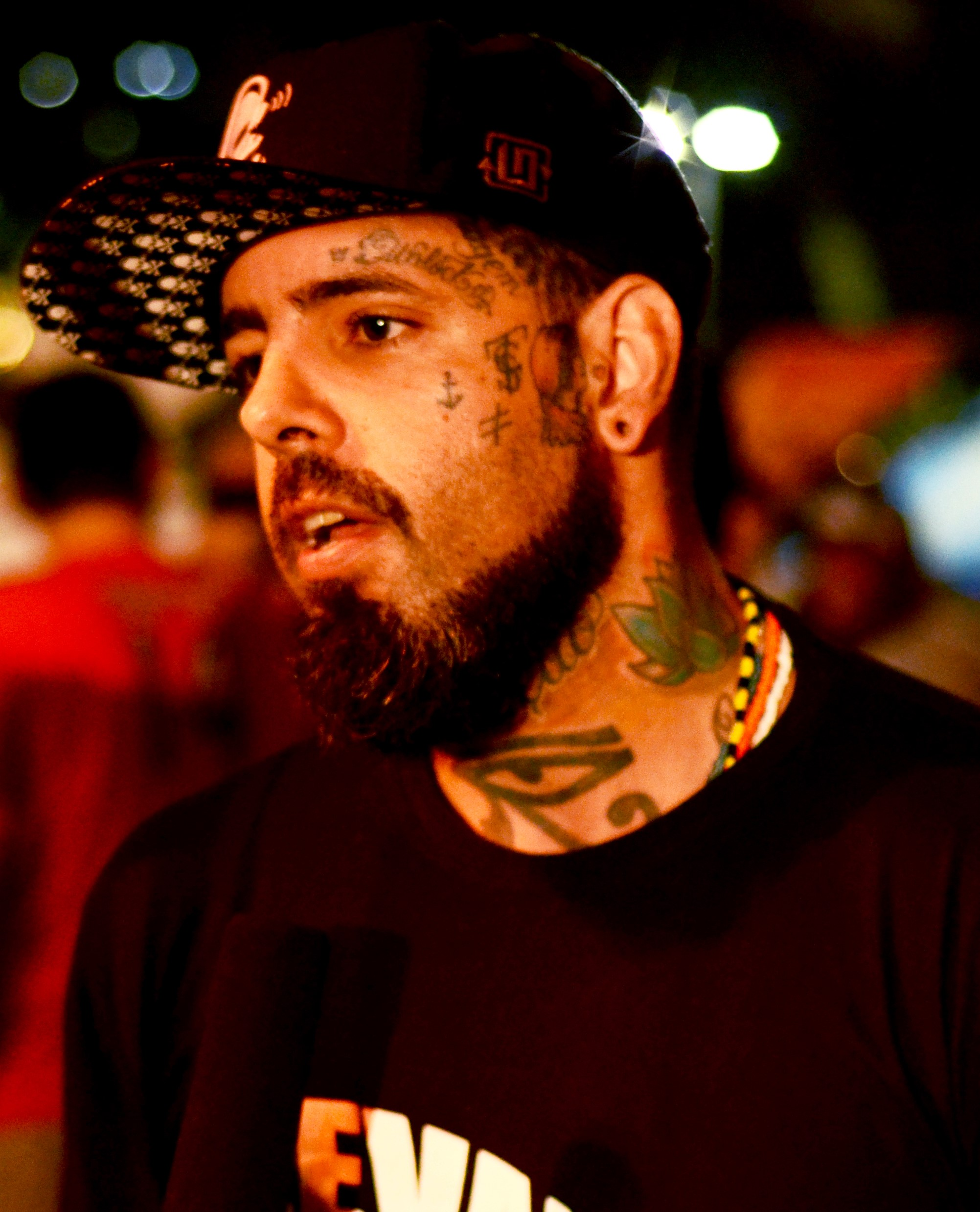
- Tico Santa Cruz in 2016

Background information
- Born: September 30, 1977 (age 49); Rio de Janeiro, Brazil
- Genres: Alternative rock; post-punk; psychedelic rock; hard rock; garage rock
- Occupations: Musician; singer-songwriter; writer; activist
- Instruments: Vocals; guitar

Tico Santa Cruz (born Luis Guilherme Brunetta Fontenelle de Araújo; September 30, 1977) is a Brazilian musician, singer-songwriter, writer, and activist. He is the frontman of rock band Detonautas Roque Clube.

== Early life ==
Santa Cruz studied social sciences, communication, and physical education but did not complete any of the three majors because of his dedication to music.

== Career ==
Composer, writer and poet, Tico created a group of social performance called Voluntários da Pátria (Patriotic Volunteers) that aims to bring music, poetry and socio-political debates in schools and public universities and private detention facilities across the country.
Over the past years he kept his blog Clube da Insônia (Sleeplessness Club) with diverse texts, posters, erotic stories, poems, lyrics, with emphasis on issues related to citizenship and youth.
He is currently a writer for the Brazilian newspaper O Dia, which has a column every Monday. Tico also writes for the ecological magazine Onda Carioca and collaborates with the magazine M....
Launching the fourth album with his band named O Retorno de Saturno, Tico Santa Cruz travels the whole of Brazil playing rock.
He is interested in books, documentaries, movies and stories to tell.

Raimundos

After much speculation, Tico Santa Cruz will take the vocals of Raimundos from January 2010. Who has confirmed the singer on the group was the guitarist and lead singer, Digão, in an interview for Folha Online, the newspaper Folha de S.Paulo, on November 24, 2009.

Initially Tico is only a guest of the group, but the project can earn higher proportions depending on the response from fans. "Tico is a great friend and a very competent guy", said Digão for the newspaper Folha de S.Paulo. "We entered an agreement to split the vocals, I sing sometimes and he will do most, but I would be all the time playing guitar and backing vocals while not singing."

On November 27, 2009, Raimundos performed featuring Tico Santa Cruz in the Festival Virtual Cerrado, in Brasília, in a tribute to producer Tom Capone. Digão revealed that the presentation will be a jam between friends and Tico should sing the songs "Herbocinética", "Bonita", "A Mais Pedida" and "Eu Quero Ver o Oco".

== Activism ==
Tico is well known for his protests against the impunity for criminals and corrupt politicians in Brazil during Workers' Party government. In an interview he stated about his political struggle and its relationship with drugs: "I'm for legalization because the system behind the prohibition kills more than the drug itself."

== Personal life ==
In May 2021, Tico came out on Twitter as sexually fluid.

== Discography ==
- Detonautas Roque Clube (2002)
- Roque Marciano (2004)
- Psicodeliamorsexo&distorção (2006)
- O Retorno de Saturno (2008)
- Detonautas Roque Clube EP (2011)

== Citations ==
=== Other sources ===
- Blog Tico Santa Cruz (in Portuguese)
- Quem Magazine: Ten questions from readers to Tico Santa Cruz (in Portuguese)
- Tico Santa Cruz and the Raimundos (in Portuguese)
