= Rodrigo Netto =

Brazilian musician

- Born: 5 May 1977; Rio de Janeiro, Brazil
- Died: 4 June 2006 (aged 29); Rio de Janeiro, Brazil
- Genres: Rock
- Occupation(s): Musician, singer-songwriter
- Instrument: Guitar

Rodrigo da Silva Netto (Rio de Janeiro, 5 May 1977 – Rio de Janeiro, 4 June 2006), better known as Rodrigo Netto or Nettinho, was the rhythm guitarist of the Brazilian rock band Detonautas.

== Death ==
On the night of 4 June 2006, while returning from a party in Rio de Janeiro, Rodrigo was in his car with his brother and grandmother when four criminals in another car tried to intercept him. Rodrigo accelerated and was consequently shot, hit in the armpit and chest and instantly killed. At the time, the Detonautas were going to make live performances on 5–7 June, but the shows were postponed. Some time later, Tchello, the bassist, tattooed on his back an image of Rodrigo's face as a way to honor his friend and Tico, the vocalist, tattooed Netto's signature on his rib.
