= Tchello =

Brazilian guitarist

- Tchello at Quinta da Boa Vista.

Background information
- Born: January 2, 1975; Belo Horizonte, Brazil
- Genres: Rock
- Occupation: Musician
- Instrument: Bass

Tchello (born Eduardo Simão Lopes; January 2, 1975 in Belo Horizonte, Minas Gerais) is the former bassist and co-founding member of the Brazilian rock band Detonautas Roque Clube.

== Career ==
=== Detonautas Roque Clube ===
In 1997, Tico Santa Cruz appeared in a chatroom asking if anyone could play instrument, and then, Tchello, who was also in the room, answered positively and became known by his nickname.

The singer Tico lived in Copacabana, Rio de Janeiro and Tchello had a guesthouse in Ilhéus, Bahia.

After the meeting of the two precursors in Rio de Janeiro, the band went through several configurations, until more members were recruited through the Internet. The fact of how the band was formed reflected in its name: Detonadores (detonators) + Internautas (Internauts) = Detonautas.

=== 11:11 ===
The 11:11 is not a band but a group of musicians and artists of various nationalities who meet, virtually or otherwise, since 2006, to jam sessions to discuss about technology, art and musicality. The show at Grito Rock marks the debut of the collective on stage.

The name 11:11 came after a chat between Tchello and the keyboardist Fabrizio Iório (Ex-Som da Rua) on the number of times that the number appeared daily 11-11 for Tchello. Fabrizio, then, indicated the book: "11:11 – Abrindo os Portais" (Opening the Gates), which influenced the name of the project, which has already signed some soundtracks for short films.
