= Renato Rocha (guitarist) =

Brazilian guitarist

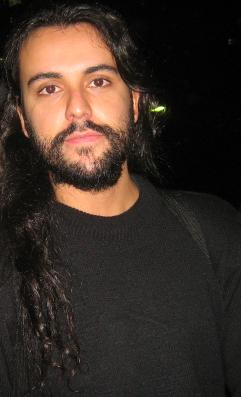

Background information
- Born: 4 July 1975 (age 51); Rio de Janeiro, Brazil
- Genres: Rock, pop rock
- Occupation: Musician
- Instruments: Guitar, keyboards

Renato Rocha (born 4 July 1975) is a Brazilian guitarist known for his work with alternative rock band Detonautas Roque Clube.

== Career ==
Renato has been playing for Detonautas since its formation in 1997. He was invited to join Detonautas by Tico Santa Cruz at a chatroom, equal to other members.

== Activism ==
Rocha often participates in protests with Tico Santa Cruz against the immunity from prosecution for Brazilian corrupt politicians and criminals, often bringing many fans.
