= Konstantino Atan =

Brazilian actor (born 1999)

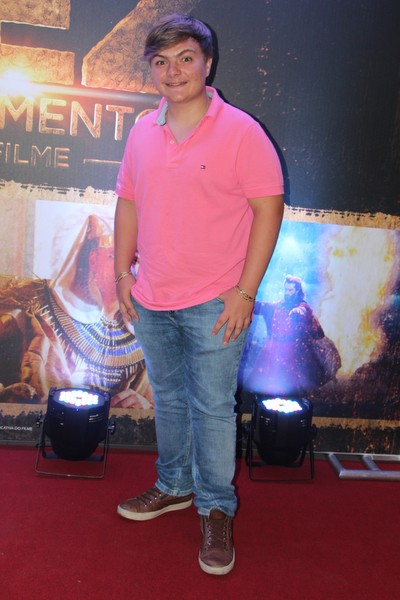
- Konstantino in 2016
- Born: Konstantino Antonio Atanassopulos; July 14, 1999 (age 26); São Paulo, Brazil
- Occupation: Actor
- Years active: 2009–present

Konstantino Antonio Atanassopulos (born July 14, 1999), best known as Konstantino Atan, is a Brazilian actor. From 2012 to 2013, he played the character Adriano, in the remake of the children's telenovela Carrossel, by SBT.

== Career ==
Konstantino Antonio Atanassopulos was born in the city of São Paulo, on July 14, 1999, to Vera Lucia Rebecca and Constantino Jorge Antonio Atanassopulos. He performed for the first time in 2009, participating live in the program Hoje em Dia, from RecordTV, in a special edition in favor of Sociedade Pestalozzi, on September 25. At the invitation of the singer and comedian Tiririca, Konstantino portrayed himself as Tiririquinha and performed the song "Florentina", fun was guaranteed and the actor helped raise funds for this important cause.

His story at SBT began when he participated in the "Pais e Filhos" segment of the Programa Silvio Santos, where he met the greatest presenter of Brazilian television. In the meantime, in 2010, Konstantino participated in the "Pergunte para Maisa", where Maisa Silva answered questions about the most different subjects, sent by children from all over Brazil, with the help of Konstantino and other participants.

Between 2012 and 2013, he played the dreamer Adriano Ramos, one of the characters in the remake of the children's telenovela Carrossel do SBT. The highlight of his character were the scenes in his room, in which the actor acted with other elements, such as the famous talking sock called "Chulé". In the children's cast, he was the oldest of the actors.

As soon as the success of Carrossel ended, Konstantino dubbed some episodes of Carrossel in Cartoon that were aired in 2016, also on SBT, and continued his career, where he participated in commercials for the Candide brand and acted alongside the player Neymar in a commercial for Claro TV.

In 2014, he appeared in the first two seasons of the Spin-off series Patrulha Salvadora, where he gave life to Adriano Ramos again. In 2015, he debuted in theaters with the same character in Carrossel - O Filme. In 2016, he participated in the sequel Carrossel 2: O Sumiço de Maria Joaquina. In 2019, he was in theaters but once in the film Os Parças 2, alongside the protagonists Whindersson Nunes, Tirullipa and Tom Cavalcante.

== Filmography ==
=== Film ===
Year	Title	Role	Notes
2015	Carrossel: O Filme	Adriano Ramos	
2016	Carrossel 2: O Sumiço de Maria Joaquina	Adriano Ramos	
2019	Os Parças 2	Juca	

=== Television ===
Year	Title	Role	Notes
2009	Hoje em Dia	Tiririquinha	
2010	Programa Silvio Santos	Himself	
2012–13	Carrossel	Adriano Ramos	
2013	Carrossel Especial de Natal	Adriano Ramos	Television special
2014	Patrulha Salvadora	Adriano Ramos	Participation Season 1 and 2
2015	Buuu - Um Chamado Para a Aventura	Bola	Participation "Cobrindo os Rastros"
2016	Carrossel Desenho Animado	Adriano Ramos (voice)	Dubbing
2025	A Caverna Encantada	Adriano Ramos	Participation Season 2

== Theater ==
Year	Title	Role
2013	Especial Carrossel: Circo Tihany	Adriano Ramos
2014	Musical Grease	
2016	Criança para sempre: O Musical	Himself

== Discography ==
Year	Song	Album
2012	A Banda	Carrossel Vol. 2
2013	Filhote do Filhote	Carrossel Especial Astros
