= Tati Zaqui =

Brazilian Internet personality (born 1994/1995)

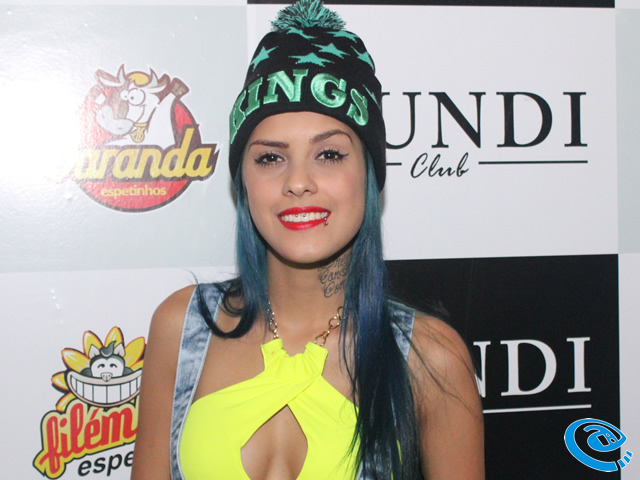
- Zaqui in 2015
- Born: Tatiane Zaqui Ferreira da Silva; 1994 or 1995 (age 31–32); São Caetano do Sul, São Paulo, Brazil
- Occupations: Singer-songwriter, dancer, influencer
- Years active: 2013–2023 (singer); 2024–present (influencer)
- Partners: MC Kauan (2018); Thomaz Costa (2022–2023); Mateus Oliveira (2025–present)
- Musical career
- Genres: Brazilian funk (2013–2023); gospel music (2023)
- Instrument: Vocals

Tatiane Zaqui Ferreira da Silva (born 1994 or 1995), known professionally as Tati Zaqui, is a Brazilian digital influencer and entrepreneur, and former funk singer-songwriter and dancer. Originally known for the bright blue hair she sported during her early career and her outspoken stances, she reached fame in 2014 as a funk ostentação/ousadia artist with the hit single "Parará Tibum"; following her conversion to Evangelicalism in 2023 and the release of the gospel song "Me Guia", she has since declared her withdrawal from the music industry.

== Biography ==
Zaqui was born in São Caetano do Sul, São Paulo, and raised in Santo André. She first began writing songs with 7 years old, and initially studied to be a flight attendant. Her musical career officially began in 2013, when she uploaded to YouTube the song "Salve, MC Kauan", a tribute to the eponymous musician, her future boyfriend and, later, fiancé; it reached over 15,000 views in a day after he shared it in his Facebook page. She counts MC Kauan as one of her major influences, alongside Dulce María and Justin Bieber, for whom she would also write the tribute "Rolê com Bieber".

It wasn't until 2014 when Zaqui reached nationwide fame with the song "Parará Tibum", a "sexy cover" of the song "Heigh-Ho" from the 1937 Disney film Snow White and the Seven Dwarfs. "Parará Tibum" went viral after a video of actress Bruna Marquezine dancing to the song surfaced on the Internet, prompting Zaqui to come up with the "Parará Tibum Challenge", encouraging people to record themselves dancing to the song; participants included Anitta, Preta Gil and Cláudia Leitte. A music video, produced by KondZilla, was released in 2015 and reached 6 million views in less than two weeks; however, the song was later removed from all platforms due to allegations of copyright infringement from Disney.

In 2015 she released the song "Água na Boca", travelling to Cancún for the shooting of its music video. The same year, in July, she posed for Playboy Brasil.

In August 2017 she released a collaborative track with singer Lexa, "Movimento".

In September 2019, alongside Dadá Boladão and OIK, she released the song "Surtada", described as "a foray into brega funk". By the end of that year, a remixed version of "Surtada" became the most streamed song on Spotify in Brazil, with Zaqui recording a video on her Instagram to celebrate it.

On August 2, 2020, she released the duet "Aguenta" with rapper Pelé Milflows. In February 2021 she and Milflows collaborated once more, alongside fellow rappers Mikezin, SóCiro and Olivia, for the single "Baila Mais 2". Later that year, on July 30, she released the collaboration "Amiga Não Julga" alongside Karen Kardasha and Renato Shippee.

In March 2022 Zaqui opened up accounts on content subscription services OnlyFans and Privacy, acquiring over 15,000 subscribers in less than three weeks in the latter. Later in September she was chosen as a contestant of the fourteenth season of RecordTV's reality show A Fazenda, ending as the fourth contestant to be eliminated on October 13.

In late 2023, Zaqui stated she planned to switch her focus from funk to gospel music after converting to Evangelicalism; her first foray into the genre, "Me Guia", was released on November 3. She had initially elaborated that, while she didn't plan to abandon the funk scene as a whole, she now strived to "value the quality of her lyrical content" as a Christian woman. In January 2024, she announced she'd also stop posting adult content to subscription services, and would begin giving coaching lessons; later that year, in June, she inaugurated her own brand of eyewear, Tatiane Zaqui Eyewear. In September, she stated she was planning to retire from the music industry altogether.

== Personal life ==
Zaqui is bisexual, and came out openly in 2015. In a 2016 interview she stated she was "dating someone", later revealed to be her life-long idol MC Kauan; they announced their engagement in February 2018, but eventually broke up six months later. In 2019 she admitted to have had a brief affair with Neymar during the Carnival season, claiming it "was good"; subsequently, she would also have affairs with Gabriel Jesus, surfer Gabriel Medina, funk singers MC Don Juan, MC Orochi and Biel (the latter a decision she "later regretted"), and Mayla Araújo, sister of Big Brother Brasil 17 contestant Emilly Araújo.

Throughout 2019 Zaqui dated footballer Yan, brother of Yuri, who played for Santos and Audax. From 2022 to 2023 she was in an on-again-off-again relationship with actor and fellow A Fazenda contestant Thomaz Costa; they broke up definitely after she reported Costa for several domestic violence allegations. In September 2025 Zaqui began a relationship with entrepreneur Mateus Oliveira; later that year in November she announced she had suffered a miscarriage while pregnant with her first child from Oliveira. The couple officially engaged on September 5, 2026.

In July 2016 she was forced to cancel a performance after being admitted to an hospital under suspects of a viral disease.

On November 30, 2020, Zaqui had to undergo an emergency surgery after suffering from symptoms of endometriosis.

In the aftermath of her conversion to Evangelicalism in 2023, Zaqui announced on May 29, 2024, on her social media that she was nine months sober following a self-described "marijuana addiction" which, according to her, lasted for the past nine years.

== Awards and nominations ==
Year	Award	Category	Result	Ref.
2020	MTV Millennial Awards Brazil	Zika do Baile	Nominated	
