= Lacração Twins =

Mariely Santos Mirella Santos
- Born: 15 August 1999 (age 27); Jaboatão dos Guararapes, Brazil
- Occupations: Influencers; singer; dancer
- Years active: 2018–present
- Spouse: Mirella- Gabriel Farias (m. 2019)

Instagram information
- Page: eumirellasantos
- Years active: 2018-present
- Followers: 10.9 million- Mirella; 7.8 million- Mariely

YouTube information
- Channel: Descontraidas MPM
- Years active: 2021–2022
- Subscribers: 400k (5 December 2022)
- Views: 23 million (5 December 2022)
- Musical career
- Genres: bregafunk; eletrobrega; arrocha funk
- Label: Start Music

Mariely Santos da Silva and Mirella Santos da Silva (born 15 August 1999), known as Lacração Twins (As Gêmeas Lacração in Portuguese), are singers, dancers and influencers. They are identical twins. They work with the Brazilian singer MC Loma.

== Discography ==
=== Singles ===
Year	Title	English Approximated Title	Directors
2018	"Meu Ritmo"	"My Rhythm"	MC Loma e as Gêmeas Lacração
2018	"Envolvimento"	"Involvement"	MC Loma e as Gêmeas Lacração
2018	"Patricinha de Favela" (MC Loma feat. Ni do Badoque)	"Shanty Town Preppy"	Produção Independente
2018	"Envolvimento"	"Involvement"	Kondzilla
2018	"Treme Treme"	"Shake Shake"	Tchatchael (Start Music)
2018	"Na Vibe"	"In the Vibe"	Tchatchael (Start Music)
2018	"Meu Ritmo" (MC Loma e as Gêmeas Lacração & DJ Torricelli)	"My Rhythm"	Tchatchael (Start Music)
2018	"Paralisa" (MC Loma e as Gêmeas Lacração & MC WM)	"Paralyse"	Tchatchael (Start Music)
2018	"Passinho do Japonês"	"Little Dance Step of the Japanese"	Tchatchael (Start Music)
2018	"Rebola"	"Twerk it"	Tchatchael (Start Music)
2018	"Lacração" (MC Loma e as Gêmeas Lacração & Os Cretinos)	"Slaying"	Tchatchael (Start Music)
2018	"Disputa do Bumbum"	"Dispute of the Butt"	Tchatchael (Start Music)
2018	"Hit Paradinho"	"Stopped Hit"	Tchatchael (Start Music)
2018	"Tá Suave, Tá Legal"	"It's Soft, It's Cool"	Tchatchael (Start Music)
2019	"Malévola" (MC Loma e as Gêmeas Lacração & DJ Dubai)	"Maleficent"	MC Loma e as Gêmeas Lacração e Victor Ferreira (Infinity Films)
2019	"Ela Me Usa e Abusa" (MC Loma e as Gêmeas Lacração & Calice)	"She uses and abuses me"	Mateus Rigola (Start Music)
2019	"Xonadão"	"So much in love"	Mateus Rigola
2019	"Quero em Dobro"	"I want it double"	Vitor Tavares
2020	"Predadora"	"Predator"	Vitor Tavares
2020	"Tava Ali"	"I Was There"	Vitor Tavares
