= Parará Tibum =

Single by Tati Zaqui
- Released: June 23, 2014
- Recorded: 2014
- Genre: Brazilian funk; funk ousadia
- Length: 3:05
- Songwriter: Tati Zaqui
- Producer: DJ Perera

Tati Zaqui singles chronology
"Parará Tibum" (2014)	"Água na Boca" (2015)

"Parará Tibum" (also written as "Parará Ti Bum") is a song by former Brazilian funk artist Tati Zaqui; her first professional release as a recording artist, it was independently released for digital download on June 23, 2014. It was inspired by, and uses samples of, the song "Heigh-Ho" off the 1937 Disney film Snow White and the Seven Dwarfs. After a video of actress Bruna Marquezine dancing to the song surfaced on the Internet, it became a viral hit, prompting Zaqui to come up with the "Parará Tibum Challenge", encouraging people to record themselves dancing to the song; participants included Anitta (who would also make a cover of the song), Preta Gil and Cláudia Leitte.

On February 10, 2015, a music video for the song, produced by KondZilla, was released, reaching 6 million views in less than two weeks. It features Zaqui dancing in a scanty costume resembling Snow White, accompanied by dwarfs.

In May 2015, following allegations of copyright infringement and objections to its sexually explicit content from Disney, the song was removed from all streaming platforms, and its music video deleted from YouTube.
