= Olha a Explosão =

2016 funk paulista song by MC Kevinho

Single by MC Kevinho
- Released: 26 December 2016
- Genre: Funk ostentação
- Length: 2:42
- Songwriter(s): Kevin Kawan de Azevedo

MC Kevinho singles chronology
"Turumtum" (2016)	"Olha a Explosão" (2016)	"Olha a Explosão (with Wesley Safadão)" (2017)

"Olha a Explosão" (transl. "Watch The Explosion") is a song by the Brazilian singer MC Kevinho, released in late 2016, gaining notoriety the following year as a meme. The official music video was released on the official channel of Kondzilla on YouTube and has received over one billion views.

== Charts ==
Chart (2017–18)	Peak position
Colombia	54
Portugal (AFP)	14

== Wesley Safadão version ==
"Olha a Explosão"

Single by MC Kevinho and Wesley Safadão
- Released: 2 February 2017
- Genre: forró
- Length: 2:25
- Songwriter(s): Kevin Kawan de Azevedo

MC Kevinho singles chronology
"Olha a Explosão" (2016)	"Olha a Explosão" (2017)	"Dog Vagabundo" (2017)

Wesley Safadão singles chronology
"Você Partiu Meu Coração" (2017)	"Olha a Explosão" (2017)	"Ninguém É de Ferro" (2017)

"Olha a Explosão" is a forró version of the music of the same name with the Brazilian singer Wesley Safadão. The clip of this version was posted on the official Kondzilla channel on the YouTube.

== Olha a Explosão Remix ==
"Olha a Explosão Remix"

Single by Kevinho, 2 Chainz, French Montana and Nacho
- Language: Portuguese; English; Spanish
- Released: April 27, 2018
- Recorded: 2017
- Genre: pagofunk; funk paulista; rap
- Length: 3:31
- Label: Universal Music
- Songwriter(s): Kevin Kawan de Azevedo; Tauheed Epps; Karim Kharbouch; Miguel Ignacio Mendoza Donatti

Kevinho singles chronology
"Pega a Receita" (2018)	"Olha a Explosão Remix" (2018)	"#PaPum" (2018)

2 Chainz singles chronology
"PROUD" (2018)	"Olha a Explosão Remix" (2018)	"Bigger Than You" (2018)

French Montana singles chronology
"Me So Bad" (2018)	"Olha a Explosão Remix" (2018)	"Welcome to the Party" (2018)

Nacho singles chronology
"No Te Vas" (2018)	"Olha a Explosão Remix" (2018)	"Casualidad" (2018)

"Olha a Explosão Remix" is a remix of the song "Olha a Explosão" featuring the singer Nacho and the rappers 2 Chainz and French Montana. The Official Lyric Dance Video was posted on the official Kondzilla channel on YouTube platform.

=== Certifications ===
Region	Certification	Certified units/sales
France (SNEP)	Platinum	200,000^{‡}
Italy (FIMI)	Gold	25,000^{‡}
Spain (PROMUSICAE)	Gold	30,000^{‡}
United States (RIAA) Remix	Platinum (Latin)	60,000^{‡}
^{‡} Sales+streaming figures based on certification alone.
