= MC Loma =

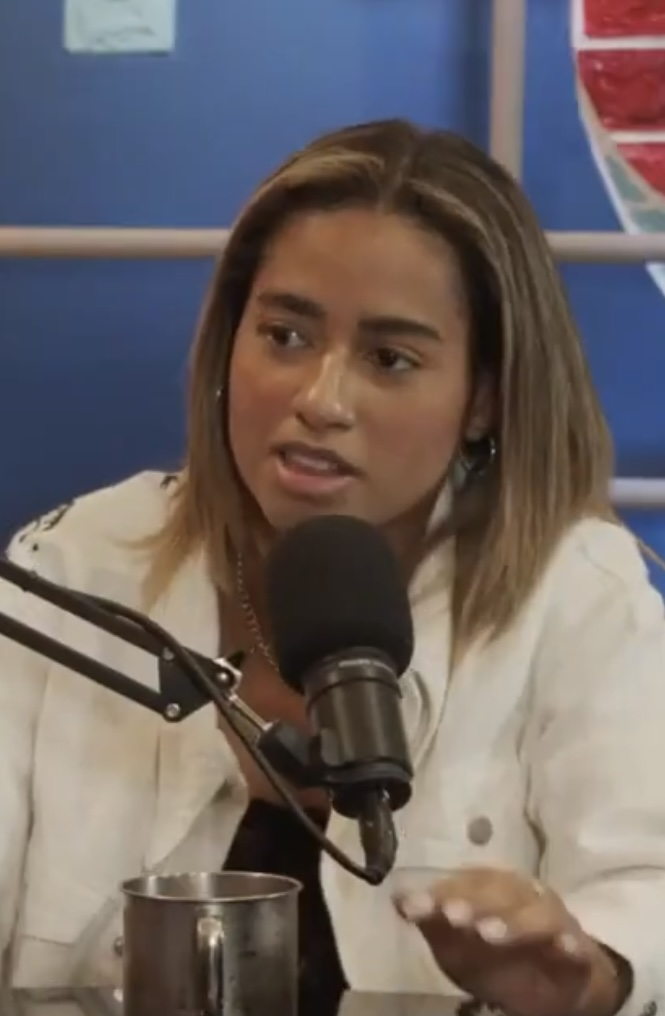
- MC Loma in 2021

Background information
- Also known as: MC Loma
- Born: Paloma Roberta Silva Santos; Jaboatão dos Guararapes, Pernambuco, Brazil
- Genres: brega; brega-funk; Funk carioca; eletrobrega
- Occupation: Singer
- Years active: 2018–present

Paloma Roberta Silva Santos (born in 2002), known professionally as MC Loma, is a Brazilian singer, who achieved national success in 2018 with the hit "Envolvimento", The hit reached first place on Spotify's top 50 list and reached more than 200 million views on YouTube. She works with Gêmeas Lacração in the group "MC Loma e As Gêmeas Lacração".

Known for putting a distinctive comedy tune in their clips, the singer and her dancers traveled to São Paulo, where they performed in many carnival blocks. Several singers such as Anitta, Metturo, Wesley Safadão and Solange Almeida had already sung the song that became the hit of Carnival 2018.

On 9 February 2018, the new official video clip of singer MC Loma, was released by Start Music (Kondzilla). MC Loma e As Gêmeas Lacração signed a contract with the label Start Music.

== Discography ==
=== Singles ===
Year	Title	English Approximated Title	Directors
2018	"Meu Ritmo"	"My Rhythm"	MC Loma e as Gêmeas Lacração
2018	"Envolvimento"	"Involvement"	MC Loma e as Gêmeas Lacração
2018	"Patricinha de Favela" (MC Loma feat. Ni do Badoque)	"Shanty Town Preppy"	Produção Independente
2018	"Envolvimento"	"Involvement"	Kondzilla
2018	"Treme Treme"	"Shake Shake"	Tchatchael (Start Music)
2018	"Na Vibe"	"In the Vibe"	Tchatchael (Start Music)
2018	"Meu Ritmo" (MC Loma e as Gêmeas Lacração & DJ Torricelli)	"My Rhythm"	Tchatchael (Start Music)
2018	"Paralisa" (MC Loma e as Gêmeas Lacração & MC WM)	"Paralyse"	Tchatchael (Start Music)
2018	"Passinho do Japonês"	"Little Dance Step of the Japanese"	Tchatchael (Start Music)
2018	"Rebola"	"Twerk it"	Tchatchael (Start Music)
2018	"Lacração" (MC Loma e as Gêmeas Lacração & Os Cretinos)	"Slaying"	Tchatchael (Start Music)
2018	"Disputa do Bumbum"	"Dispute of the Butt"	Tchatchael (Start Music)
2018	"Hit Paradinho"	"Stopped Hit"	Tchatchael (Start Music)
2018	"Tá Suave, Tá Legal"	"It's Soft, It's Cool"	Tchatchael (Start Music)
2019	"Malévola" (MC Loma e as Gêmeas Lacração & DJ Dubai)	"Maleficent"	MC Loma e as Gêmeas Lacração e Victor Ferreira (Infinity Films)
2019	"Ela Me Usa e Abusa" (MC Loma e as Gêmeas Lacração & Calice)	"She uses and abuses me"	Mateus Rigola (Start Music)
2019	"Xonadão"	"So much in love"	Mateus Rigola
2019	"Quero em Dobro"	"I want it double"	Vitor Tavares
2020	"Predadora"	"Predator"	Vitor Tavares
2020	"Tava Ali"	"I Was There"	Vitor Tavares

=== As featured artist ===
Year	Title	Directors
2018	"No Talentinho" (MC Gui & MC Loma e as Gêmeas Lacração)	Kondzilla
2018	"Não se Apaixona" (Jerry Smith & MC Loma e as Gêmeas Lacração)	Marcelo Vidal (Start Music)
2018	"Pac Pac" (PANKADON, Aretuza Lovi & MC Loma e as Gêmeas Lacração)	Marcelo Vidal (Start Music)
2018	"O Rei Mandou" (MC Jhey & MC Loma e as Gêmeas Lacração)	Marcelo Vidal (Start Music)

=== Others apparitions ===
Year	Title	Artist	Directors
2018	"Novinha, Você É uma Flor"	MCs Thin & Alexandre	Kondzilla

=== Guest songs ===
Year	Title	Artist
2018	"Duelo"	MC Dando DK, MC Loma e as Gêmeas Lacração & Babi Muniz
2018	"Tá Suave, Tá Legal"	MC Loma e as Gêmeas Lacração & MC Jhey
