= Gaga =

Gaga, ga-ga, GAGA and other variants, may also refer to:

== Culture and society ==
- Gaga (game), an Israeli form of dodgeball
- Gaga (god), a minor Babylonian deity
- Gaga (dance vocabulary), a movement language and pedagogy used in some Israeli contemporary dance
- Gagá, the name used in the Dominican Republic for a type of Haitian music otherwise known as Rara
- Gaga (film), a 2022 Taiwanese film
- Giọng ải giọng ai (subtitled Hidden Voices), a Vietnamese television game show; part of the I Can See Your Voice franchise
- "Radio Ga Ga", a 1984 song by Queen
- Gaga, a dialect of the Franco-Provençal language spoken in the region around Saint-Étienne, France
- "Gaga", a 2024 song by J Balvin and Saiko from Rayo

== People ==
- Lady Gaga (born 1986 as Stefani Joanne Angelina Germanotta), American singer, songwriter, and actress
- Gaga Chkhetiani (born 1983), Georgian footballer
- Gaga de Ilhéus (born 1953), Brazilian comedian

== Other uses ==
- GAGA, an influential paper by Serre on algebraic geometry and analytic geometry
- Gaga (plant), a genus of fern named for Lady Gaga
- Gaga, Central African Republic, a village in Central African Republic
- Gaga (company), publisher of the video game Dark Seed
