= Thomaz Costa =

Brazilian actor (born 2000)

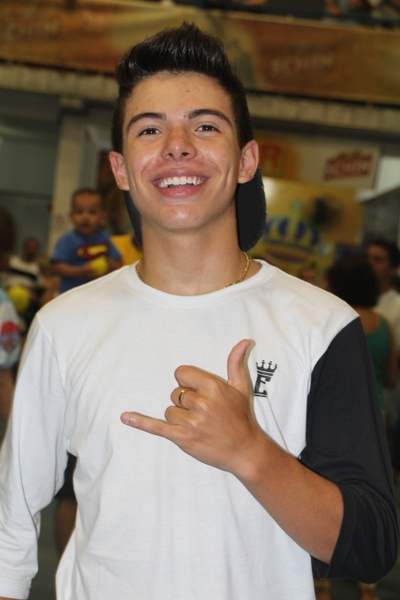
- Thomaz Costa in 2016.
- Born: Thomaz Roberto Costa Santos; 14 June 2000 (age 26); São Paulo, Brazil
- Occupation: Actor
- Years active: 2009–present
- Height: 1.76 m (5 ft 9 in)

Thomaz Costa, stage name of Thomaz Roberto Costa Santos (born June 14, 2000), is a Brazilian actor and adult content creator.

== Biography and career ==
Thomaz was born in São Paulo, the son of Luciana Santos and Roberto, and the older brother of Lívia Helena. He has been studying theater since he was 3 years old. Thomaz's first job was Claro's commercial called Claro Conselhos. This advertisement was recorded in Montevideo, Uruguay. He was the winner of the "Cena em Ação" contest of the Hebe program at SBT, Thomaz won a role in the novel "Vende-se um Véu de Noiva". The following year he appeared in the Brazilian production of the musical show "O Rei e Eu", a sophisticated production that obtained excellent reviews and nominations, which premiered on February 27, 2010 in São Paulo, at Teatro Alfa. In 2012, he participated in the Brazilian remake of the novel Carrossel, where he interpreted the scholar Daniel Zapata, both reprinting in the series Patrulha Salvadora of 2014 and in the cinemas in Carrossel: The Film of 2015 and in the continuation Carrossel 2: O Sumiço de Maria Joaquina de 2016. In 2018, he became an evangelical Christian and was baptized in the waters. In 2022, joined the sexy rehearsal platform OnlyFans. Months later, he announced that he would stop publishing his intimate content, as his new decision is to build a family.

== Filmography ==
=== Television ===
Year	Title	Role	Notes
2009-10	Vende-se um Véu de Noiva	Lucas Sabadin	
2012–13	Carrossel	Daniel Zapata	
2013	Carrossel Especial de Natal	Daniel Zapata	
2014–15	Patrulha Salvadora	Daniel Zapata	
2014	É Natal, Mallandro!	Daniel Zapata	
2016	Dance se Puder	Daniel Zapata	Himself (Participant)
2020	Canta Comigo Teen	Juror	
2021	Ilha Record	Participant	Season 1, 9th place
2022	A Fazenda	Participant	Season 14, 17th place

=== Film ===
Long and short films starring Thomaz Costa
Year	Title	Role	Notes	Ref.
2015	Carrossel: O Filme	Daniel Zapata		
2016	Carrossel 2: O Sumiço de Maria Joaquina	Daniel Zapata		
2016	Deixe-me Viver	Gustavo		
2017	Eu Fico Loko	Rodrigo		
2020	Amiga do Inimigo	Gustavo Escobar	Netflix	
2022	#PartiuFama	JC (José Carlos)	Participation	

=== Internet ===
Year	Title	Role	Ref.
2019–2021	Em Prova	Gustavo Escobar	

== Stage ==
Year	Title	Role
2010	O Rei e Eu	Prince
2013	Show Carrossel no Circo Tihany	Daniel Zapata
2015	As crianças mais Amadas do Brasil	Himself

== Discography ==
=== Music videos ===
Title	Year	Director(s)	Notes
Avisa Elas	2020	Pires	KondZilla
Vem Pro Bailão	2020	Tony Senas	KondZilla

== Personal life ==
From 2022 to 2023 Costa was in a relationship with singer and fellow A Fazenda 14 contestant Tati Zaqui.

In March 2024, Thomaz Costa was involved in a major controversy after humiliating a former co-worker, reducing his participation in the soap opera Carrossel. Actor Metturo was publicly humiliated by Thomaz just for being a stunt double for scenes while Thomaz was part of the main cast of the soap opera Carrossel.
