= Kevinho =

Brazilian MC

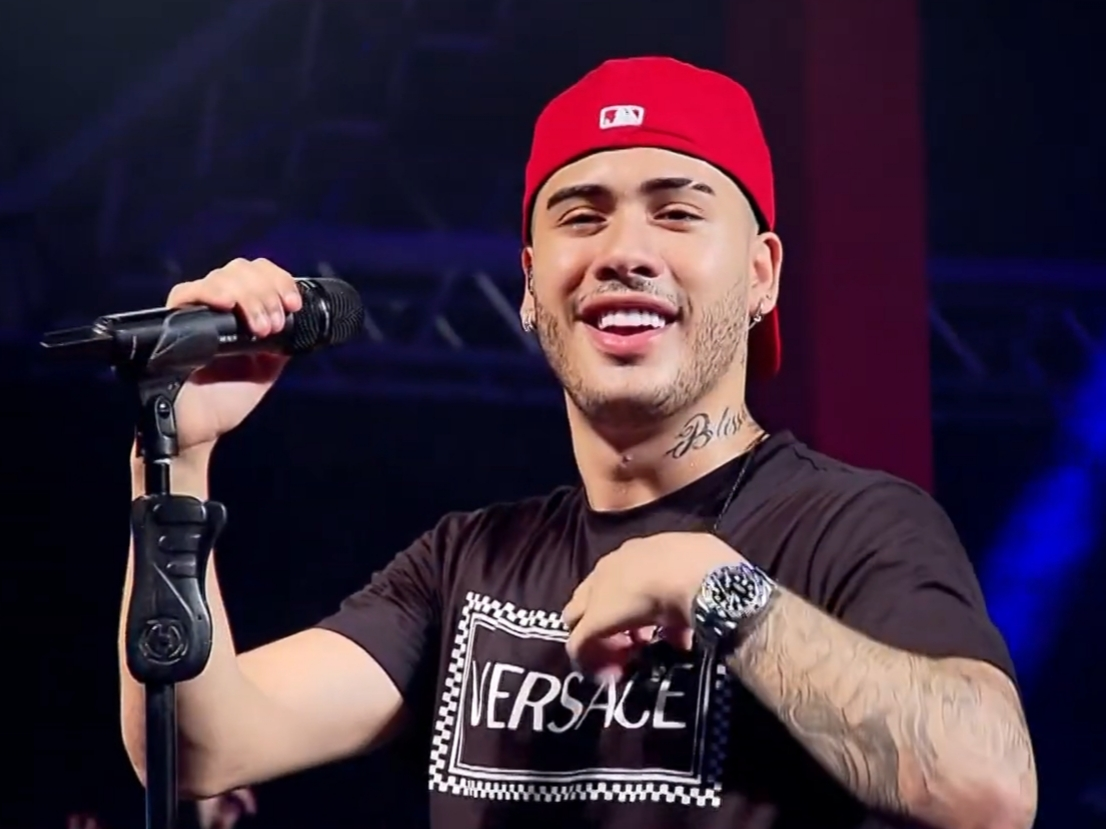
- Kevinho in 2019
- Born: Kevin Kawan de Azevedo; Campinas, São Paulo, Brazil
- Occupations: Singer; songwriter
- Years active: 2012–present
- Musical career
- Genre: Funk ostentação
- Instrument: Vocals
- Label: Warner Music

Kevin Kawan de Azevedo, better known as Kevinho, is a Brazilian singer and songwriter. He is best known for his 2016 hit "Olha a Explosão". His music is most commonly classified as funk carioca.

== Career ==
=== 2012-2017: Career beginnings and "Olha a Explosão" ===
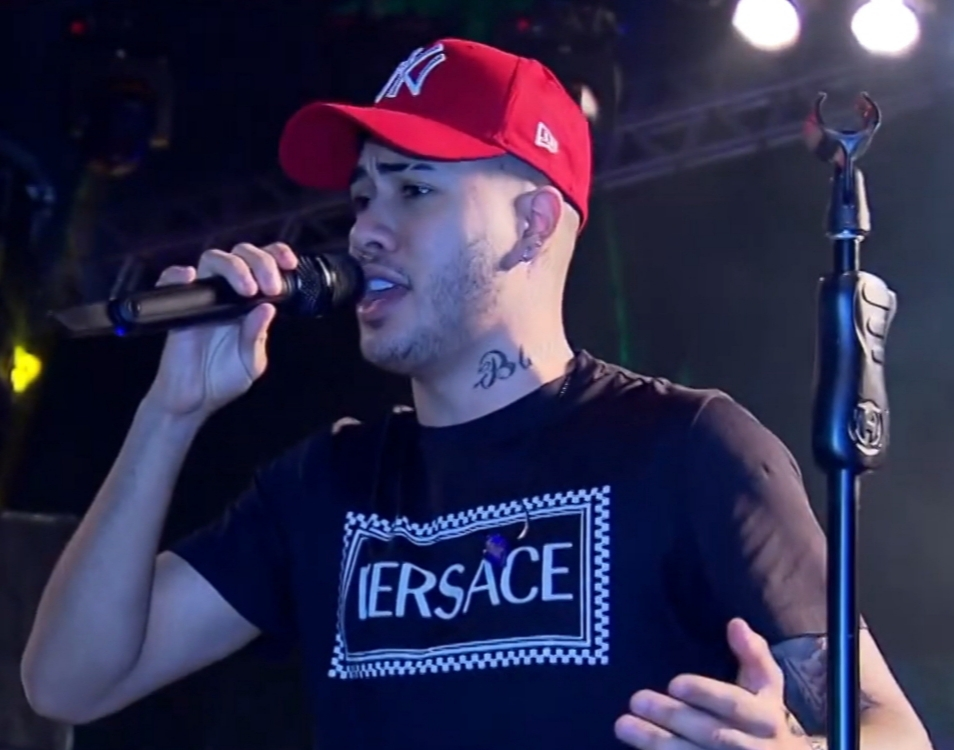
Kevinho in 2019

He began releasing music in 2012, distributing his songs online, highlighting the song "Tá Bombando É". Earlier in his career, Kevinho was a member of KL Produtora and appeared as a guest participant in several clips released by other artists of the producer. In 2016, he became a member of KondZilla Records and in May released his first single to gain wide attention, "Elas Gostam" featuring MC Davi. In September, he released the single "Tumbalutum", a song after which he appeared on several television programs. In March 2017, the single "Turutum" was released.

In December the single "Olha a Explosão" was released. The song became his main hit, becoming a hit, being a long time between the most played in the country and carnival in 2017, making the singer become known nationally. The song also entered the Latin American charts, earning an international remix in partnership with American rappers French Montana and 2 Chainz and Venezuelan singer Nacho. The song also gained a version in forró with the participation of singer Wesley Safadão. In March 2017, he released the single "O Grave Bater". In June, the single "Tô Apaixonado Nessa Mina" was released. In July, he released the single "Encaixa" in partnership with singer Léo Santana. In November, he released with the participation of country duo Matheus & Kauan the single "Deixa Ela Beijar". In December, the single "Rabiola" was released.

=== 2018-present: Subsequent singles ===
In January 2018, he released the single "Ta Tum Tum" in partnership with country duo Simone & Simaria. In May, he released the single "Papum", a World Cup hit. In September, the single "O Bebe" was released with the participation of MC Kekel. In December, he signed to Warner Music Records and released the single "Agora É Tudo Meu" in partnership with Dennis DJ. In March, he released the single "Facilita". In April, the single "Salvou Meu Dia" was released in partnership with singer Gusttavo Lima. In June, he released the single "Uma Nora Pra Cada Dia". Having these last three songs released on the Spotify Top 200. In August, he released the single "Credo que Delícia". On May 15, he released the single "Te Gusta".
