= Lexa discography =

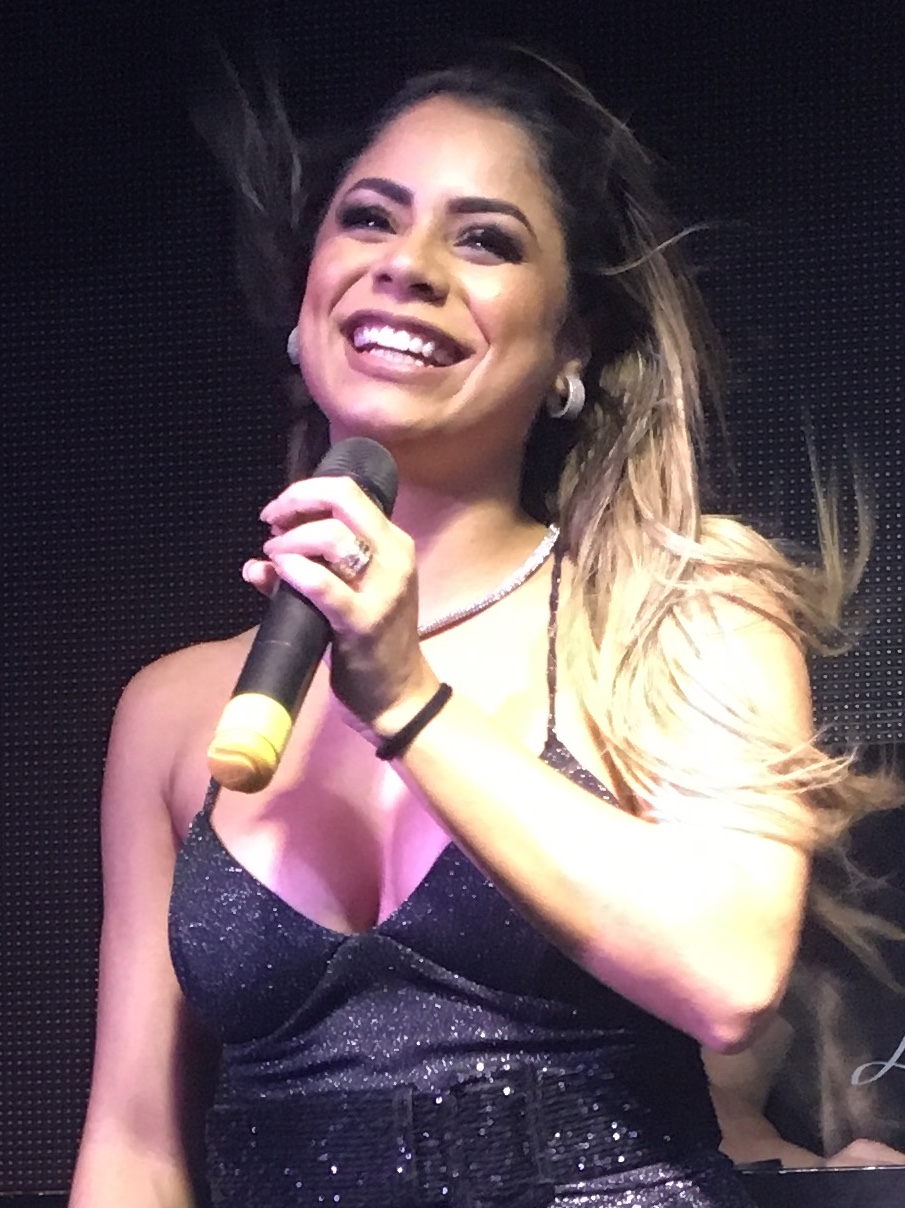
- Lexa in 2019
- Studio albums: 2
- EPs: 2
- Singles: 7
- Music videos: 4

Lexa, a Brazilian singer, songwriter, and dancer, has released two studio albums, two extended plays, and seven singles.

Lexa's first single, Posso Ser, was released in December 2014. It was featured on Brazil Hot 100 Airplay's Top 30 Singles.

Posso Ser became the title track of Lexa's debut Extended Play (EP) album, released in March 2015. The album contained four songs, including "Posso Ser". The same album was re-released in April 2015 with the bonus track "Delete".

Lexa released her first studio album on September 18, 2015. The album had 13 tracks, including all five songs from the EP.

== Albums ==
=== Studio albums ===
Title	Album details	Sales
Disponível	Released: September 18, 2015 (BRA); Label: Som Livre; Formats: CD, digital download	ARA: 30.000
LEXA	Released: September 17, 2020 (BRA); Label: Som Livre; Formats: CD, digital download	
Mania	Released: November 29, 2024 (BRA); Label: Som Livre; Formats: Digital download	

=== EPs ===
Title	Album details
MC Lexa	Released: September 13, 2013(BRA); Label: Som Livre; Format: Digital download
Posso Ser	Released: March 3, 2015(BRA); Label: Som Livre; Format: Digital download
Posso Ser (Premium)	Released: April 3, 2015(BRA); Label: Som Livre; Format: Digital download
Só Depois do Carnaval	Released: January 31, 2019(BRA); Label: Som Livre; Format: Digital download
YouTube Music Night	Released: January 16, 2020(BRA); Label: Som Livre; Format: Streaming
Luau da Lexa	Released: February 17, 2022(BRA); Label: Som Livre; Format: Digital download
Magnéticah	Released: August 26, 2022(BRA); Label: Som Livre; Format: Digital download
Essa Fada	Released: December 15, 2023(BRA); Label: Som Livre; Format: Digital download

== Singles ==
=== As lead artist in songs ===
Title	Year	Album
"Quem Manda Sou Eu"	2013	Mc Lexa
"Baladeira"	2014	Disponível
"Se Eu Mandar"	2016	Non-album single
"Já É"	2016	Non-album single
"Vem Que Eu Tô Querendo"	2017	Non-album single
"Movimento" (featuring Tati Zaqui)	2017	Non-album single

== Other charted songs ==
Featured in
Title	Year	Album
"Fogo" (MC Guimê featuring Lexa)	2015	Non-album single

== Music videos ==
Title	Year	Other artist(s)	Director(s)	Ref.
As lead artist
"Posso Ser"	2015	None	Raoni Carneiro	
"Para de Marra"	2015	None	Rafael Almeida	
"Disponível"	2015	None	Isabelle Lopes	
"Pior Que Sinto Falta"	2015	None	Isabelle Lopes	
"Fogo na Saia"	2016	None	Jun Yassuda Júnior; Fernando D'Araújo	
As featured artist
"Fogo"	2015	MC Guimê		
