= Envolvimento =

2018 single by MC Loma

Single by MC Loma
- Released: January 20, 2018
- Genre: Arrocha-funk
- Length: 2:24
- Songwriter(s): Mirella Santos Silva
- Producer(s): Paloma Roberta Silva Santos

MC Loma singles chronology
"Meu Ritmo" (2017)	"Envolvimento" (2018)	"Patricinha de Favela" (2018)

Music video
- "Envolvimento" on YouTube

"Envolvimento" (transl. Involvement) is a song by the Brazilian girl band MC Loma e as Gêmeas Lacração. The Official Music Video became the second viral video on YouTube of Brazil in Canal Descontraídas (the Gêmeas Lacração channel), after "Meu Ritmo". It became more famous when the Brazilian YouTuber Felipe Neto reacted to the music video and famous singers sang this song like Anitta, Wesley Safadão and Solange Almeida. The music won the title of the Carnaval hit of 2018, and another Official Music Video produced by Kondzilla.

"Envolvimento"

Single by MC Loma e as Gêmeas Lacração
- Released: February 9, 2018

MC Loma e as Gêmeas Lacração singles chronology
"Patricinha de Favela" (2018)	"Envolvimento" (2018)	"Treme Treme" (2018)

Music video
- "Envolvimento" on YouTube

== Music video (Original) ==
At the beginning of the clip, MC Loma is on the street talking on the phone with her friend planning to go to the movies with her. When she cannot find an Uber to take her, she asks a boy on his bike for a ride. When she starts to sing, the scene changes to her dancing next to a car, she and the Gêmeas Lacração dancing in swimsuits, MC Loma dancing under a shower, the Gêmeas Lacração wagging the singer with leaves and MC Loma sitting on a chair with the Gêmeas Lacração dancing.

== Reception ==
Chart (2018)	Peak position
Top 50 Viral Songs Spotify Global	1

After the song became a copyright music with the Official Music Video on Kondzilla, it reached the number one position on the Viral Music chart on Global Spotify. The original music video has over 45 million views and the Kondzilla version has over 220 million views. In Prêmio MTV Miaw Brasil, it won the category "Hino de Karaokê".
