= MC Pikachu =

Brazilian rapper (born 1999)

- Born: Matheus Sampaio Correa; September 23, 1999 (age 26)
- Origin: Suzano, São Paulo, Brazil
- Genres: Funk ostentação, funk ousadia
- Occupation: Singer
- Years active: 2009–present
- Label: KL Produtora (2009, 2015, 2016–present)

Matheus Sampaio Correa (born September 23, 1999), better known by his stage name MC Pikachu, is a Brazilian rapper. Named after the Pokémon, MC Pikachu was born in the Suzano neighborhood, located in the East Zone of São Paulo, and joined the funk ousadia career in 2014, at age 15, through his participation in the music video for his cousin, MC Bin Laden. The singer had his first taste of fame with the single "Feliz Natal," featuring MC Bin Laden and MC 2K.

MC Pikachu caused controversy because of the explicitly pornographic lyrics in some songs, most notably in the song "Tava na Rua", where he also made references to illicit drugs, because the singer was underage, getting to be prevented from doing shows.
