= MC Lon =

- Born: Airon de Lima; 24 November 1991; Bom Jardim, Pernambuco, Brazil
- Genres: Hip hop, Funk ostentação
- Occupations: Singer, songwriter, rapper
- Years active: 2009 – present
- Labels: Sony Music; Batidão Funk

MC Lon, stage name of Airon de Lima, is a singer-songwriter. He came to fame after the release of the song "Novinha, Vem que Tem", that has over 30 million hits on YouTube and is now one of the leading names in funk ostentação.

After the success, MC Lon had his first contact with television stations. Before his success, he earned about 3.00 dollars per haircut, and now with their invoice, shows an average of 400 thousand dollars a month. Lon grew up without his father, but after winning his fame, went to his father and found him. In the award ceremony YouTube Music Awards in 2013, MC Lon introduced Marina da Glória in Rio de Janeiro, with Eminem as the winner of the award.

== Discography ==
=== Singles ===
- Visão da Sobrevivência part. 2
- Novinha, Vem que Tem
- Brasileiro que Nunca Desiste
- O Tempo não Espera (part. MC Guimê)
- Talento Raro
- A Festa
- Cabelo Arrepiado
- Se joga (part. MC melqui)
