= Shaolin (humorist) =

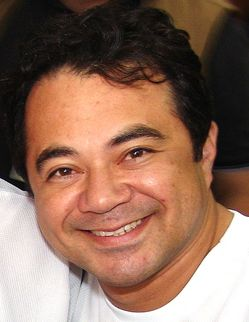
- Born: Francisco Jozenilton Veloso; 8 May 1971; Coremas, Paraíba, Brazil
- Died: 14 January 2016 (aged 44); Campina Grande, Paraíba, Brazil
- Notable work: Cartoonist, caricaturist, journalist and writer

Comedy career
- Genre: Satire

Francisco Jozenilton Veloso (8 May 1971 – 14 January 2016), better known by his pseudonym and stage name Shaolin, was a Brazilian cartoonist, caricaturist, humorist, comedian, and media presenter.

== Biography ==
He was born in Coremas, Paraíba. He started his career at the Teatro Municipal Severino Cabral in Campina Grande. He also worked as a presenter on Rádio Campina Grande and drew cartoons for the newspapers A Palavra, Jornal da Paraíba, and Revista Nordeste.

== Shows ==
His best-known shows are Domingão do Faustão, Show do Tom and later Tudo é Possível ("All is possible"), with Ana Hickmann, in which he satirized Brazilian celebrities such as Leonardo, Joelma (singer in the duo Banda Calypso) and Zezé di Camargo.

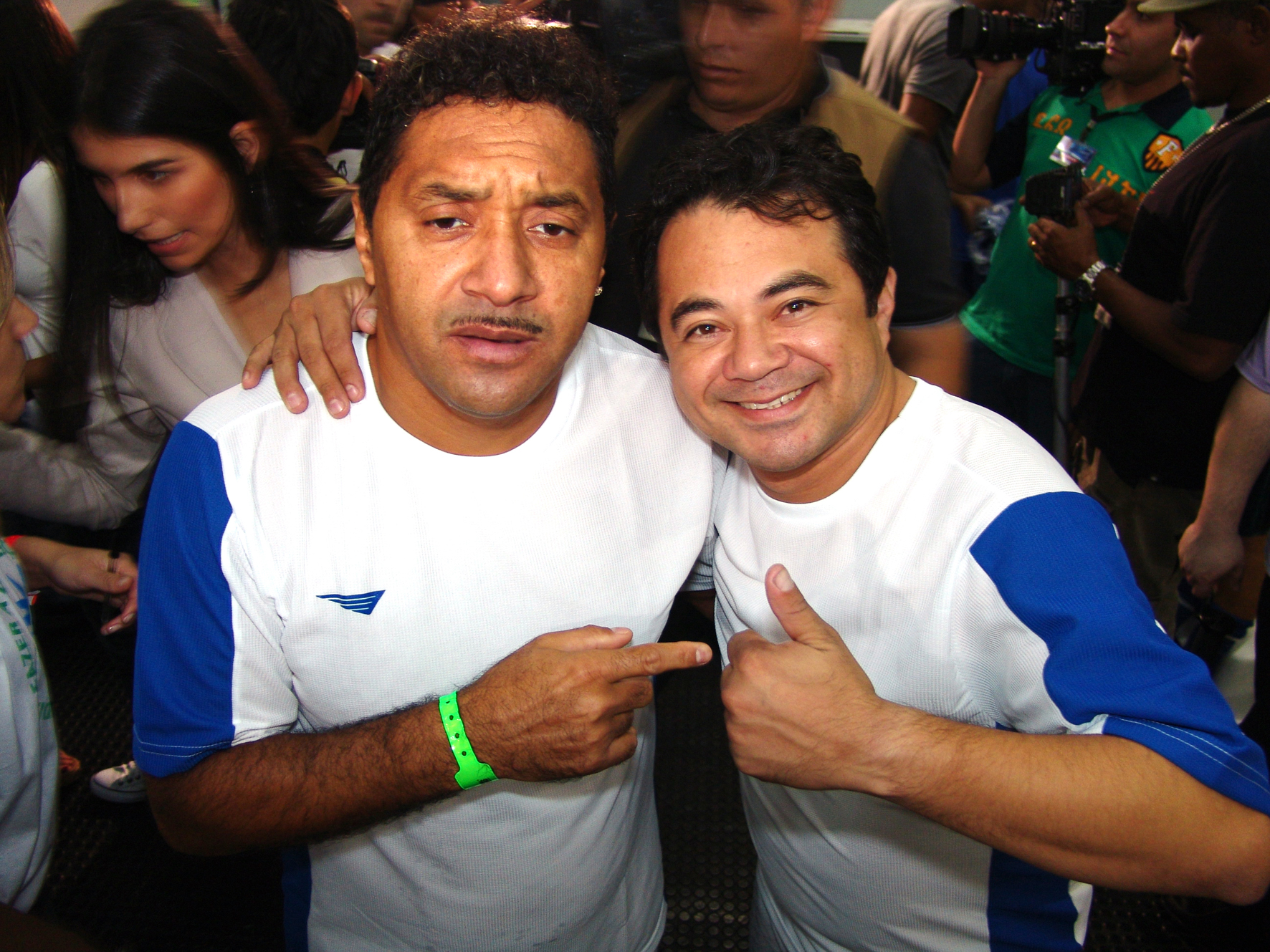
Shaolin and his friend Tiririca

== Accident ==
On 19 January 2011, Shaolin was seriously injured in a traffic accident when his car collided with a truck in Campina Grande on the highway BR-230.

Until May, he remained in a coma in intensive care, and then left the hospital to go home, although he had not recovered from his injuries.

In September 2012, he began communicating again using movements of his eyelid helped by a machine.

== Family ==
In December 1994, he married Laudiceia Veloso, with whom he had two children.

== Death ==
On 14 January 2016, Shaolin died following a myocardial infarction.
