= Coremas =

Coremas, Paraíba, Brasil Cidade das águas
- Municipality
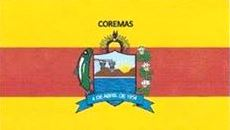
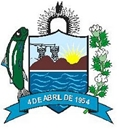
- Flag Coat of arms

- Location in Brazil
- Coordinates: 7°01′S 37°58′W
- Country: Brazil
- Region: Northeast
- State: Paraíba
- Mesoregion: Sertão Paraibano

Population (2020)
  - Total: 15,441
- Time zone: UTC−3 (BRT)
- Area code: 58770-000
- Website: http://www.coremas.pb.gov.br

Coremas is a municipality in the state of Paraíba in the Northeast Region of Brazil.

Coremas was born as a village of the Carirì Indians, and it became a city only in 1954.

== Famous people ==
- Shaolin, 1971, humorist

== See also ==
- List of municipalities in Paraíba
