= Timothy Mulholland =

Brazilian-American professor (born 1949)

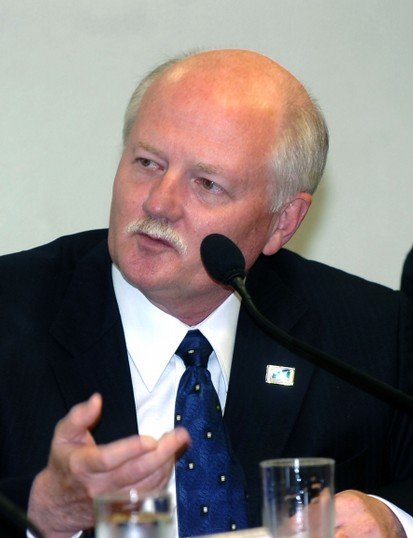
- Mulholland (2008)
- Born: Timothy Martin Mulholland; November 13, 1949 (age 76); United States
- Citizenship: Brazil; United States
- Occupation: Psychologist
- Known for: Former Rector of the University of Brasília (UnB)
- Relatives: Rosanne Mulholland (daughter)

Timothy Martin Mulholland (born November 13, 1949) is a Brazilian-American professor. He is a Psychology graduate from Westmont College and obtained Master's and Doctoral degrees in Cognitive Psychology from the University of Pittsburgh.

== Biography ==
Mulholland was born in the United States but moved to Brazil with his family at the age of two. He holds a bachelor's degree in psychology from Westmont College (1971), a master's and a doctorate in cognitive psychology from the University of Pittsburgh (1974 and 1976, respectively).

Timothy was a professor at the University of Brasília from 1976. As head of the university he held all the most important positions: Director of the Institute of Psychology, Head of the Rector's Office, Vice Rector from 1997 to 2005 and finally rector elected in 2005.

Mulholland holds both American and Brazilian citizenship. He became a Brazilian citizen in 1996.

He has three stepdaughters and two children, including Brazilian actress Rosanne Mulholland.

== Complaint ==
He was accused by the Public Prosecutor's Office of committing administrative impropriety. The accusation is that he would have spent R$470,000.00 reais (approximately US$117,000.00) for the purchase of a car and to furnish a functional apartment that he came to occupy with his family almost a year. The money would have come from an institutional development fund of the University of Brasília. The case caught the attention of the public by the absurd amount of R$900 reais (approximately $225) spent on the purchase of a bin.

On April 4, 2008, UnB's rectory was occupied by students who demanded the departure of the Rector. Mulholland responded by saying that "he would not leave because he had been democratically elected". On April 10, however, Mulholland asked to be removed from office for sixty days, and soon afterwards he resigned.

== Books ==
Year	Title	Publishing company
2006	DF em Questão	Unb
2006	A Universidade e o Futuro do País - Série Brasil em Questão	Unb
