= Carrossel =

Brazilian children's telenovela

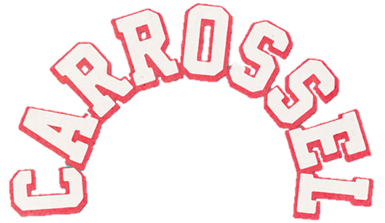
- Genre: Children's telenovela Comedy; Drama
- Created by: Íris Abravanel
- Based on: Carrusel by Lei Quintana and Gabriela Ortigoza (Note: Itself inspired by the Argentinean telenovela Jacinta Pichimahuida, la Maestra que no se Olvida, written by Abel Santa Cruz.)
- Directed by: Reynaldo Boury
- Starring: Maisa Silva; Guilherme Seta; Rosanne Mulholland; Larissa Manoela; Jean Paulo Campos
- Opening theme: Carro-céu by Priscilla Alcantara and Yudi Tamashiro
- Ending theme: Carro-céu by Priscilla Alcantara and Yudi Tamashiro
- Country of origin: Brazil
- Original language: Portuguese
- No. of episodes: 310 (252 International version)

Production
- Production locations: CDT da Anhanguera, Osasco, Brazil
- Camera setup: Multiple-camera
- Running time: 60 mins.
- Production company: SBT

Original release
- Network: SBT
- Release: 21 May 2012 – 26 July 2013

Related
- Corações Feridos; Chiquititas; Carrusel (Mexican telenovela)

Carrossel (English: Carousel) is a Brazilian children's telenovela created by Íris Abravanel as a Brazilian remake of the Mexican telenovela Carrusel — itself inspired by the Argentinean telenovela Jacinta Pichimahuida, la Maestra que no se Olvida, written by Abel Santa Cruz. Originally broadcast on SBT from 21 May 2012 to 26 July 2013, it was particularly successful with children and led to several spin-offs including a cartoon series and television sitcom.

Films based on the novela were released, on 23 July 2015, Carrossel: O Filme, and a sequel called Carrossel 2: O Sumiço de Maria Joaquina, on 7 July 2016.

== Plot ==
Helena Fernandes is a young and beautiful teacher starting her career. Her first job is at the Escola Mundial (English: World School), teaching the principles of life to a third-grade class. Her warm and kindly nature wins the love of her students, all of whom have different personalities. At school, Helena has the support of employees Graça and Firmino, who love the students. But she has to endure the rules and requirements of Olívia, the director of the institution, and the envy of Suzana, a teacher who comes in to replace her for a period.

Outside of school, the children form a club led by Daniel called "Patrulha Salvadora" (English: Saving Patrol). They gather in an abandoned house and help children who are not enrolled at Escola Mundial. These include: Tom, a wheelchair-using boy who lives with his mother Glória, a teacher; Clementina, a girl who is trapped inside her own house; and Abelardo Cruz, a mischievous boy who lives with his grandfather, who is in turn fighting with his father.

The action takes place in Escola Mundial, which is coordinated and organized by severe Director Olívia. The Portuguese Firmino Gonçalves and flustered Graça are responsible for cleaning and guarding the school. Several students also have special circumstances: Mário Ayala is embittered by the death of his mother, his father's absence, and his rude stepmother; Cirilo suffers from the bias of Maria Joaquina; Jaime has low grades; Marcelina puts up with the antics of her brother Paulo; and Carmen fights with her parents.

Adriano lives with his mother and his imaginary friends, among them, the talking sock Chulé, Cirilo lives with his parents José and Paula Rivera, Carmen lives with her brother Eduardo and her parents Inês and Frederico Carrilho, Maria Joaquina lives with her maid-nanny Joana and her parents Clara and Miguel Medsen, Paulo and Marcelina live with their parents Lilian and Roberto Guerra, Valéria lives with her parents Rosa and Ricardo Ferreira, Davi lives with his grandmother Sara and his parents Rebeca and Isaac Rabinovich, Jaime lives with his brother Jonas and his parents Heloísa and Rafael Palillo and Jorge lives with his parents Rosana and Alberto Cavalieri.

Renê, an old school friend of Suzana, is hired to replace Escola Mundial music teacher, Matilde. Renê meets Helena at a party and they fall in love, but Suzana is also in love with him and tells several lies to Helena so that she will stay away from him.

The plot ends in a children's dream about the future: Daniel founds a help center for needy children under the name of "Patrulha Salvadora"; Kokimoto moves to Japan and becomes a samurai; Paulo is elected federal deputy; Marcelina works as her brother's personal advisor; Alícia takes up her pilot career; Bibi settles into an acting career; Jorge supervises the values of the Stock Exchange; Carmem fulfills her desire to be a teacher; Jaime continues as a footballer; Mario becomes a veterinarian; Davi marries Valéria, who becomes a television presenter, and is the father of triplets; Laura joins as a writer; Adriano builds his lunar station; Margarida works as a model and Maria Joaquina is her stylist, now married to Cirilo, who is a neurosurgeon. When the narrator finishes reporting what was happening with each of the characters, the scene was interrupted by Adriano, pensive in his bed: "Will the future be like this?", he asks himself.

== Characters ==
The main characters of Carrossel

- Teacher Helena Fernandes (Rosanne Mulholland): The protagonist of the telenovela. She is a 30-year-old teacher who teaches the third grade at the Escola Mundial. Beloved by all her students, Helena is kind and protective.
- Cirilo Rivera (Jean Paulo Campos): Is a poor black boy. He is better known by the students for being gullible and is often fooled by Paulo, Mário, or Kokimoto. He has a crush on Maria Joaquina.
- Maria Joaquina Medsen (Larissa Manoela): She is a rich, racist, and somewhat arrogant girl. Maria constantly brags about her father, a prominent yet humble doctor, and looks down on everyone of a lower social class, especially Cirilo, for being black. However, she helps her classmates sometimes and ends up becoming Cirilo's friend.
- Valéria Ferreira (Maisa Silva): A smart, rowdy, and sometimes mistrustful girl and Davi's girlfriend. She is always making jokes about other students during class, causing everyone to laugh.
- Jaime Palillo (Nicholas Torres): Jaime is a chubby boy who doesn't understand the lessons at school. Despite being a little slow in his studies, Jaime is very gentle and always ready to help others.
- Carmen Carrilho (Stefany Vaz): She is the poorest student in Helena's class and suffers from her parents' divorce. When Carmen has appendicitis and is operated on by Maria Joaquina's father, her operation brings her parents together again.
- Davi Rabinovich (Guilherme Seta): Valéria's Jewish boyfriend. He is called a coward by his classmates. Davi has a pet turtle named Relâmpago (English: Lightning) and once wished to make him into soup to cure Firmino, who was sick.
- Laura Gianolli (Aysha Benelli): This chubby and gluttonous girl dotes on things being "romantic". Some students make fun of her weight.
- Daniel Zapata (Thomaz Costa): The most intelligent and correct student in the class. He is good friends with Maria Joaquina and Margarida Garcia, and he is the president of the boys' club.
- Paulo Guerra (Lucas Santos): Paulo is the most troublesome in the class, a bully who makes jokes about Cirilo and Laura and mistreats his little sister Marcelina.
- Mário Ayala (Gustavo Daneluz): Mario lives with his father Germano Ayala, his stepsister, and his mean stepmother Natália Ayala. He studies at the Escola Mundial after being sent out of another school for misbehaving. On his first school day, Mario behaves so badly that Helena cries. In the course of time, his demeanor gets better and he becomes friends with everyone. He loves animals and once adopted a street dog and named it Rabito.
- Marcelina Guerra (Ana Zimerman): The sister of Paulo Guerra. Her brother hates her, but she still loves him and says the bad things he does are not his fault. She is usually made fun of because she is the smallest in her class.
- Adriano Ramos (Konstantino Atan): He has crazy dreams, which make him sleep during class time. In his room, he likes to talk to an old sock, named Chulé (English: stinky feet), and a chair named Senhor Cadeirudo.
- Alícia Gusman (Fernanda Concon): The tomboy of the class, she wears mismatching clothes, enjoys radical sports and rides her skateboard to school.
- Bibi Smith (Victória Diniz): She has an American accent because she lived in the US and mixes English words in with her Portuguese. She is the best friend of Maria Joaquina.
- Jorge Cavalieri (Léo Belmonte): The richest boy in the class and Maria Joaquina's neighbour. Jorge is very proud and acts superior to his classmates, who don't like him but they still hang out with him.
- Margarida Garcia (Esther Marcos): She is a girl from the interior who comes to live in São Paulo in the company of her mother. As a characteristic, she wore a cowboy jacket and boots. She also had a conflict with Valéria, making her jealous of her friendship with Davi, but as she time becomes friends.
- Kokimoto Mishima (Matheus Ueta): He is very small but smart. He wears a Japanese band on his head (a hachimaki) to say that he is Japanese. He is friends with Paulo Guerra and helps him with almost all his plans, but he never gets in trouble for doing them.
- Tom (João Lucas Takaki): He is in a wheelchair from a car crash which killed his father. He lives with Ms. Glória, his mother. Tom was scared to go to school because he thought the students would make fun of him, but the students of the third grade showed this wasn't the case.
- Teacher Suzana Bustamante (Lívia Andrade): A fourth-grade teacher who substitutes for the class when Helena has a car accident. She is in love with Renê, the music teacher, and tries to sabotage his relationship with Helena. She is also friends with Principal Olivia and gossips about Helena.
- Teacher Renê Magalhães (Gustavo Wabner): The Escola Mundial music teacher. He has been friends with Suzana since college and has a crush on Helena. The students of the third grade love him, so they always behave during his class.
- Firmino Gonçalves (Fernando Benini): He was born in Portugal and came to Brazil when he was older. He is a widower and the Escola Mundial groundskeeper, where the students are like the children he never had.
- Graça (Márcia de Oliveira): The maid at Escola Mundial. She loves to hear everything everyone says and voluntarily passes on information to Helena. She complains her job is not good. She hates Suzana and says she is a snake. She is a great friend of Firmino.
- Principal Olívia Veider (Noemi Gerbelli): She thinks everything can be solved with discipline. She hates Helena and believes Suzana's gossip about her.

== Cast ==
Actor/Actress	Role
Rosanne Mulholland	Teacher Helena Fernandes
Larissa Manoela	Maria Joaquina Medsen
Jean Paulo Campos	Cirilo Rivera
Maisa Silva	Valéria Ferreira
Guilherme Seta	Davi Rabinovich
Nicholas Torres	Jaime Palillo
Thomaz Costa	Daniel Zapata
Ana Zimerman	Marcelina Guerra
Lucas Santos	Paulo Guerra
Stefany Vaz	Carmem Carrilho
Gustavo Daneluz	Mário Ayala
Matheus Ueta	Kokimoto Mishima
Fernanda Concon	Alícia Gusman
Léo Belmonte	Jorge Cavalieri
Konstantino Atan	Adriano Ramos
Aysha Benelli	Laura Gianolli
Victória Diniz	Bibi Smith
Esther Marcos	Margarida Garcia
Gustavo Wabner	Teacher Renê Magalhães
Lívia Andrade	Teacher Suzana Bustamante
Ilana Kaplan	Teacher Matilde
Noemi Gerbelli	Directora Olívia Veider
Adriana Alves	Paula Rivera
Marcelo Batista	José Rivera
Adriana del Claro	Clara Medsen
Fábio Di Martino	Miguel Medsen
Marcelo Paganotti Cunha	Ricardo Ferreira
Gabi Monteiro	Rosa Ferreira
Patrícia Pichamone	Rebeca Rabinovich
Bruno Perillo	Isaac Rabinovich
Lilian Blanc	Sara Rabinovich
Rennata Airoldi	Inês Carrilho
Daniel Satti	Frederico Carrilho
Henrique Stroeter	Rafael Palillo
Ivanna Domenyco	Eloísa Palillo
Renan Cuisse	Jonas Palillo
Nábia Vilela	Natália Ayala
Ithamar Lembo	Germano Ayala
Gabriela Freitas	Lílian Guerra
Fábio Dias	Roberto Guerra
Pedro Osório	Alberto Cavalieri
Sílvia Menabó	Rosana Cavaliere
Fernando Benini	Firmino Gonçalves
Márcia de Oliveira	Graça
Cris Bonna	Cristina Fernandes

=== Special participations ===
Actor/Actress	Role
Bruna Carvalho	Nina
Triz Pariz	Cousin of Maria Joaquina
Renê Thristan	Afonso Veider
Cinthia Cruz	Fabiana
Matheus Lustosa	Eric
Mharessa Fernanda	Lola
Thiago Rosseti	Atílio
Júlia Rodrigues	Marisa
Pedro Henrique	Lucas
Kiane Porfírio	Clementina Soares
João Lucas Takaki	Tom
Henrique Filgueiras	Abelardo Cruz
Alessa Previdelli	Larissa
Déo Garcez	Marcos Morales
Tereza Villela Xavier	Teacher Glória
Júlia Karani	Diana Ayala
Metturo	Jorge Cavalieri's stunt double
Kauan Falciano	Eduardo Carrilho (Dudu)
Glauce Graieb	Regina Medsen (Gina, aunt of Maria Joaquina)
Caroline Molinari	Melissa Ferreira (Cousin of Valéria)
Guilherme Mazzei	Ricardinho
Carina Porto	Mrs.Gianolli
Bárbara Ribeiro	Mrs.Garcia
Paulo Gandolfi	Valentim Zapata
Marcos Miura	Mr.Mishima
Fábio Villa Verde	Technician Pedro Villas
Norma Blum	Ruth Soares
Deivy Rose	Anita Soares
Saulo Meneghetti	Chris Armani
Cris Poli	Bernadete
Ernando Tiago	Oscar Soares
Henrique Martins	Mr.Lourenço
Ariel Moshe	Sherlock Holmes
Patrícia Mayo	Clotilde
Carlos Mariano	Dedinho
Herbert Richers Jr.	Lobinho
Paco Sanches	Bituca
Adauto Luiz	Amendoim
Gui Vieira	Cotoco
Maurício Murray	Biriba
Hector Ricciardelli	Palito
João Ferreira	Mr. Chico
Samuel Anjos	Delegado
José Ornellas	Jean
Rhenata Tolksdorf	Célia
Jovane Nikolic	Doctor Gomes
Carlinhos Aguiar	Jurandir Souza
Clarissa Drebtchinsky	Joana
Anna Guilhermina	Sandra
Raquel Barcha	Karen Kárie
Amélia Bittencourt	Amélia Veider (Mother of Olívia)
Anna Livya Padilha	Ghost girl
Neymar	Himself
Celso Portioli	Himself
Priscilla Alcantara	Herself
Yudi Tamashiro	Himself
Olivier Anquier	Himself
Alexandre Porpetone	Himself
Restart (band)	Themselves

== International broadcast ==
- In 2014 an English version of Carrossel was broadcast on the Jamaica television channel TVJ (Television Jamaica)

Country	Alternate title	TV network(s)
Angola	Carrossel	TV Zimbo
Indonesia	Carrossel	Trans7
Bolivia	Carrusel	Red Uno
Bolivia	Carrusel	Cadena A
Colombia	Carrusel	Citytv
Ecuador	Carrusel	Ecuavisa
Honduras	Carrusel	Canal 11
Ghana	Carrossel	Multi TV
Kenya	Carrousel	Citizen TV
Venezuela	Carrusel	Televen
Chile	Carrusel	TVN
Hungary	Az élet iskolája	Super TV2
United Kingdom	Carousel	My Channel
Peru	Carrusel	America TV
Mexico	Carrusel	Tiin
Philippines	Carrossel	Telenovela Channel

== Spin-off series ==
On 22 February 2013 SBT and Super Toons confirmed they would launch in the second half of the 2013 animated spin-off of the telenovela. Production began with nine episodes of 26 minutes, which was intended to be shown across Latin America.

Also a few chapters before the premiere of the telenovela Chiquititas, which replaced Carrossel in the schedule, a mini-journal called "Carrossel TV" was aired with the characters of Carrossel presenting. The skit was performed with Valéria, Maria Joaquina, Cirilo, Jaime and Kokimoto doing interviews with the characters of Chiquititas. In the break between series SBT created a children's afternoon program called Clube do Carrossel with the same structure of other children's programs on the channel, like Bom Dia & Companhia, featuring cartoons and segments with viewers.

In 2014 Patrulha Salvadora was released which was supposed to be a continuation of the telenovela focused on action and suspense, with characters that were superheroes.
