= Daniel Satti =

Brazilian actor (born 1974)

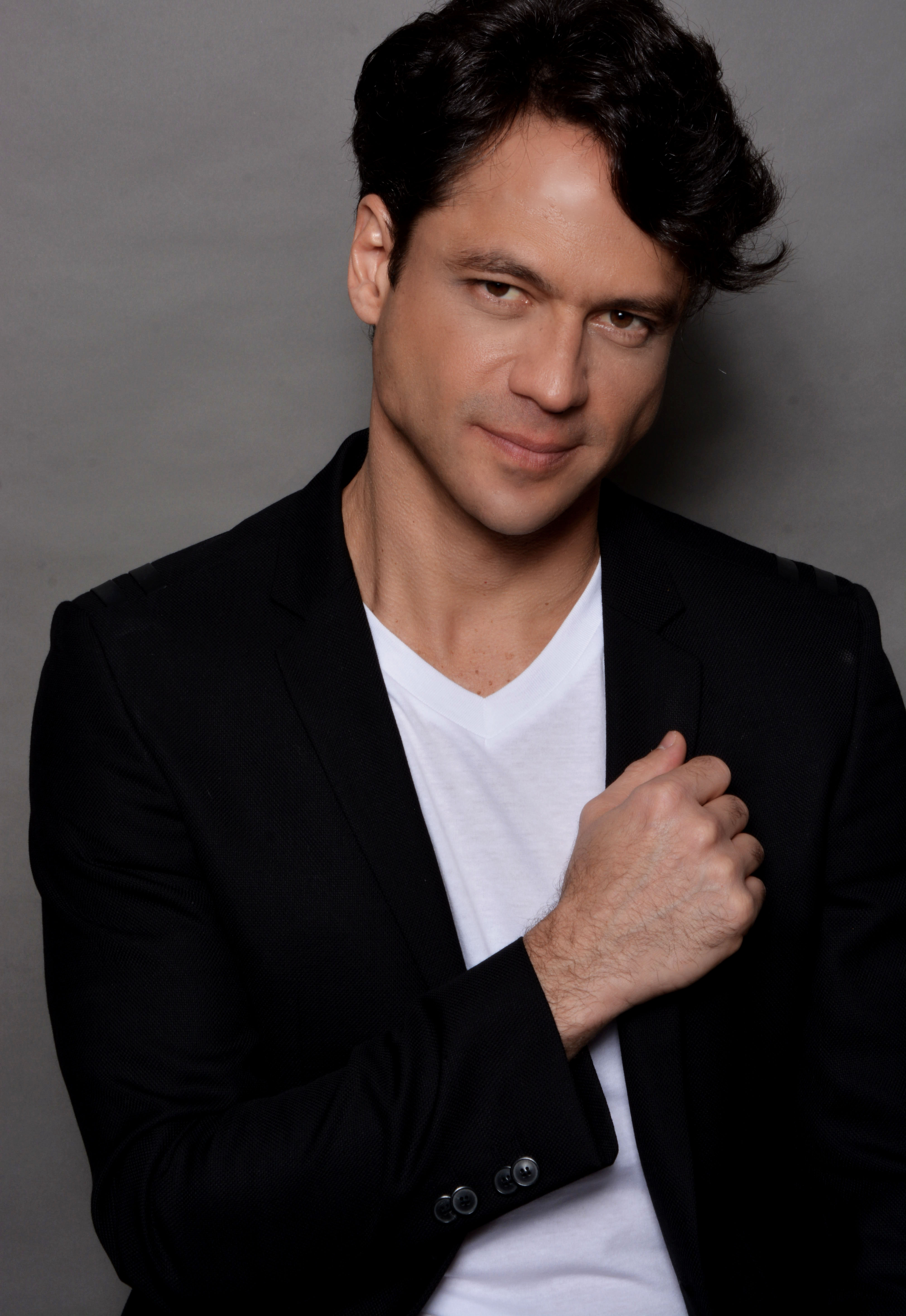
- Daniel Satti in 2019.
- Born: Daniel Costa Teixeira de Souza; April 6, 1974 (age 52); São Paulo, Brazil

Daniel Costa Teixeira de Souza (born April 6, 1974), stage name Daniel Satti is a Brazilian film and television actor. He is known for roles in various Brazilian telenovelas such as Salve-se Quem Puder (2020), Novo Mundo (2017), Os Dez Mandamentos (2015), Carrossel (2012), among others, and also for the awarded short film Entreolhares (2020).

== Career ==
Daniel premiered in Belo Horizonte as an actor in theater in 2001 leading the comedy of customs Casa, Dinheiro e Lavada, an adaptation of the text The Cousin Of California by Joaquim Manuel de Macedo. Among other play s, he acted in Fausto (Goethe) (2007) and Trem Fantasma - Uma comédia romantica (2010). In 2004 he debuted on television making a participation in the episode Is she? of the series A Diarista on TV Globo, playing Roberval. In the following years, he made other special appearances, among them, in the telenovelas A Favorita (2008), when he signed his first contract as a cast support, and Cama de Gato (2009), in addition to series Os Caras de Pau (2010).

In 2012, he gained notoriety when interpreting Frederico Carrilho, a good and decent family man who goes through financial difficulties and leaves his home despite loving his daughter Carmen Carrilho (Stefany Vaz), in the remake of the telenovela Carrossel. Until then, with stage name Daniel Satixe, he then started to sign as Daniel Satti after the end of this production. In the year of 2014 he joined the cast of Pecado Mortal in a special appearance as Pente-Fino, safety of contraventor Quim (Bruno Padilha) and exhibited by RecordTV.

== Filmography ==
=== Films ===
| Year | Film | Role | Notes |
|---|---|---|---|
| 2008 | Vingança | Carol's friend | Directed by Paulo Pons |
| 2008 | Eu Estou Bem, Cada Vez Melhor | Candidate | Directed by Rodrigo Guéron |
| 2016 | Os Dez Mandamentos | Panahasi | Directed by Alexandre Avancini |
| 2017 | Metrópole | Virgínia's Client | Directed by Miguel Rodrigues |
| 2017 | Chicote | Police officer | Directed by Fred Mayrink |
| 2019 | O Braço Direito | Munir | Directed by Rodrigo Reinhardt |
| 2020 | CEO Fantasma | Older brother | Directed by Fernando Tiezzi |
| 2020 | Te Amo pra Sempre | Gabriel | Directed by Marcos Ribas |
| 2020 | Entreolhares | Sandro | Directed by Ivann Willig |
| 2020 | Solteira Quase Surtando | Flávio | Directed by Caco Souza |
| 2020 | Amor, Confuso Amor | Jorge | Directed by André Luís |
| 2020 | QuarentenaDOC | Daniel | Directed by Sirley Franco / Fred Chalub |
| 2021 | O Faixa Preta - A Verdadeira História de Fernando Tererê | Alexandre Paiva (Gigi) | Directed by Caco Souza |

=== Television ===
| Year | Title | Role | Notes |
|---|---|---|---|
| 2004 | A Diarista | Roberval | Episode 14 |
| 2006 | O Profeta | Spectator | Chapter 149 |
| 2006 | Belíssima | Passenger 2 | Chapter 127 |
| 2006 | Pé na Jaca | Bank employee | Chapter 55 |
| 2006 | Zorra Total | News reporter | |
| 2006 | Zorra Total | Executive | |
| 2007 | Paraíso Tropical | News reporter | Chapter 1 |
| 2007 | Caminhos do Coração | Massagist | Chapters 134 and 135 |
| 2008 | A Favorita | Beto | Chapters 56, 61, 71, 79 and 94 |
| 2009 | Cama de Gato | Journalist Sérgio Madeira | Chapters 54, 66, 96, 101, 119 and 120 |
| 2010 | Tempos Modernos | Scuba diver | Chapter 55 |
| 2010 | Passione | Probation officer | Chapter 201 |
| 2010 | Os Caras de Pau | Fabão | Episode 22: "Esportistas Armadores" |
| 2010 | Separação?! | Performer | Chapter 5 |
| 2012–2013 | Carrossel | Frederico Carrilho | Chapters 6-310 |
| 2013 | Pecado Mortal | Pente-Fino | Chapters 107, 108, 109, 113, 126 and 127 |
| 2014 | Em Família | Father | "Momentos em família" Chapter 33 |
| 2015 | Os Dez Mandamentos | Panahasi | Chapters 36, 41, 43, 44, 45 and 46 |
| 2017 | Novo Mundo | Viriato Prazeres | Chapters 109, 110, 111, 155, 156, 158, 159 and 160 |
| 2019 | Jezabel | Tavern goer | Chapter 75 |
| 2020 | Salve-se Quem Puder | Donato Camargo | Chapters 1 and 2 |

== Awards and nominations ==
| Year | Awards | Category | Nominated work | Result | Ref |
|---|---|---|---|---|---|
| 2020 | The Scene Festival | Best Actor | Entreolhares (curta-metragem) | Won | |
| 2020 | Festival de Cinema de Bento Gonçalves | Best Actor | Entreolhares (curta-metragem) | Won | |
| 2020 | Lonely Wolf: London International Film Festival | Best Actor | Entreolhares (curta-metragem) | Nominated | |
| 2020 | Flight Deck Film Festival | Best Actor | Entreolhares (curta-metragem) | Won | |
| 2021 | Cult Movies International Film Festival 3rd | Best Actor | Entreolhares (curta-metragem) | Won | |

== Stage ==
| Year | Play | Character |
|---|---|---|
| 2001 | Casa, Dinheiro e Roupa Lavada | Adriano |
| 2001 | Tarzan, o Rei das Selvas | Clayton |
| 2002 | As Belas Tranças da Princesa Rapunzel | Prince |
| 2006 | .DOC | Call boy |
| 2007 | Meu Ambiente | Teacher Vivaldino |
| 2007 | Fausto | Brander |
| 2010 | Trem Fantasma - Uma Comédia Romântica | Felipe |
| 2018 | Kanibálya For All (Leitura) | Albertinho Lee Monta |
| 2022 | O Homem Mais Inteligente da História | Marco Polo |
