= Guilherme Seta =

Brazilian actor (born 2002)

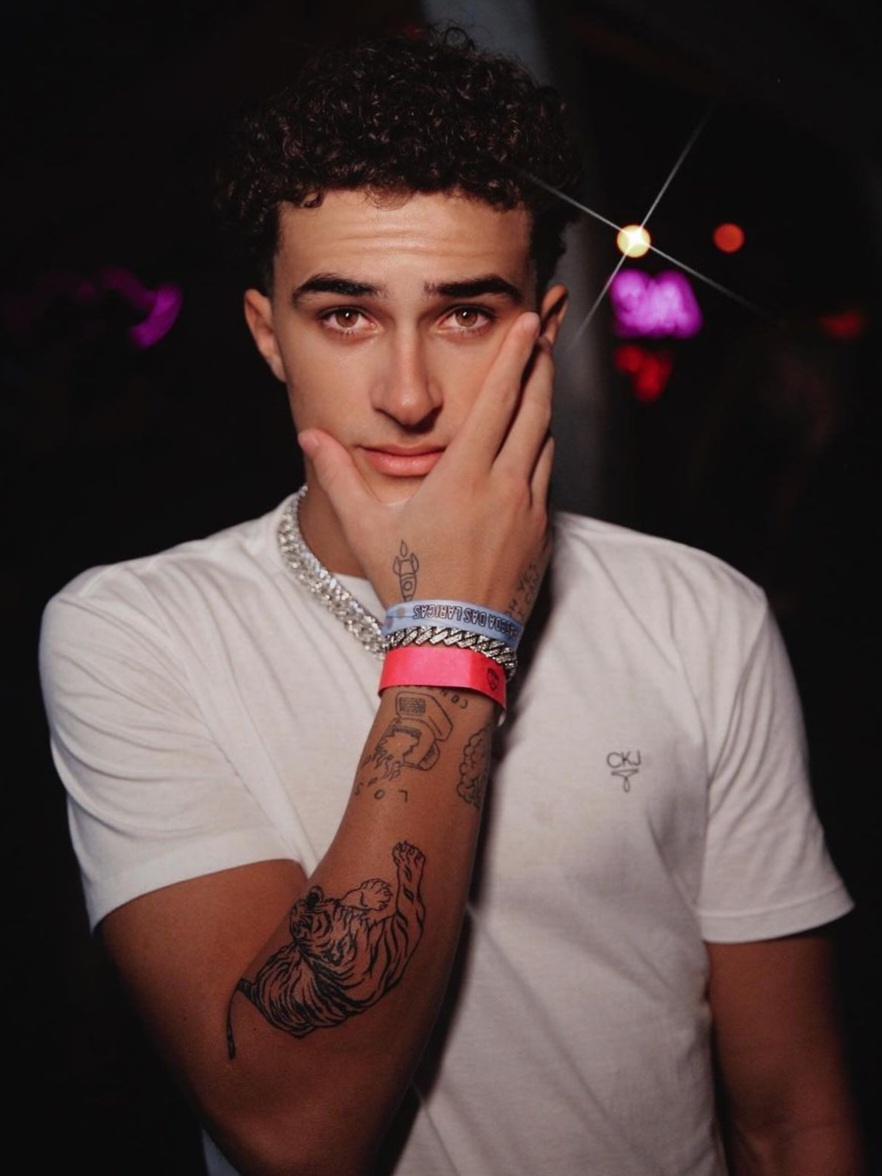
- Guilherme Seta in 2023.
- Born: Guilherme Seta de Morais Souza; 17 December 2002 (age 23); São Paulo, Brazil
- Occupation: Actor
- Years active: 2004–present
- Known for: Carrossel; Topíssima

Guilherme Seta de Morais Souza (born December 17, 2002) is a Brazilian actor. He became known from childhood when he played Davi in the remake of the Brazilian telenovela Carrossel, SBT (2012).

== Career ==
The Brazilian actor began his artistic career at the age of just 1 year, participating in a commercial for Pernambucanas, and from this contact with the cameras he never stopped. He made several commercials, including Vanish 2009, Hipercard 2010, Pernambucanas 2010, Telefônica 2011, among others. He was a poster boy for Shopping Vale Sul in São José dos Campos, where he ran a campaign for Christmas 2007 and another for Mother's Day 2008.

In 2010 he made his professional debut as a TV actor on the SBT channel, in a special appearance on the novel Uma Rosa com Amor, and in the same year, he became one of the protagonists of the children's series O Esconderijo Secreto by Discovery Kids, which remained on air until 2013.

In 2012, he played the protagonist of the film Boca in the first phase and was part of the short film Thomás Tristonho. In the same year, he was part of the remake of the telenovela Carrossel do SBT, as the Jew Davi Rabinovich, boyfriend of Maisa Silva character. Through this work on TV, Guilherme became famous and the telenovela Carrossel was shown in more than 90 countries. Still with the character Davi, in 2013 he made the Musical Carrossel at Circo Tihany, the spin-off series Patrulha Salvadora in 2014 and in 2015 and 2016 the films Carrossel: o Filme e Carrossel 2: O Sumiço de Maria Joaquina.

Also in 2016, he played Felipe in the webseries Galera do Condomínio, which contains 10 episodes with more than 17 million views on YouTube's Pik Esconde channel. The following year, this webseries earned the actor's first international career award: Rio webfest Best Child Youth Performance.

In 2017, he was one of the protagonists of Juacas, the second Brazilian series produced by Disney Channel. On the television channel called RecordTV, he has acted from 2017 to 2021 in 3 successful telenovelas: O Rico e Lázaro, Topíssima and Genesis. In 2022, on HBO Max, the actor debuts the feature film #FameTime, a teen comedy where he plays the protagonist Gabriel, a young man with a dream of being a successful YouTuber and who is in love with Bianca.

== Filmography ==
=== Movies ===
Year	Title	Role	Notes
2012	Boca	Hiroito Joanides (child)	
2012	Thomás Tristonho	Thomás Tristonho (child)	Short film
2015	Carrossel: O Filme	Davi Rabinovich	
2016	Carrossel 2: o Sumiço de Maria Joaquina	Davi Rabinovich	
2022	#PartiuFama	Gabriel	Protagonist

=== Television ===
Year	Title	Role	Notes	Network
2010	Uma Rosa com Amor	Friend of John	Episode: "June 18"	SBT
2010–13	O Esconderijo Secreto	Chico		Discovery Kids
2012–13	Carrossel	Davi Rabinovich		SBT
2014–15	Patrulha Salvadora	Davi Rabinovich		SBT
2014	É Natal, Mallandro!	Davi Rabinovich		SBT
2016	Carrossel em Desenho Animado	Davi Rabinovich (voice)	Dubbing	SBT
2017	O Rico e Lázaro	Hurzabum	Phase 1	RecordTV
2017–19	Juacas	Toco		Disney Channel
2019	Topíssima	Fernando Oliveira Soares		RecordTV
2021	Gênesis	Selá	Phase Joseph of Egypt	RecordTV
2022	Reis	Joab (young)	Phase The Choice	RecordTV
2025	Power Couple	Participant	Season 7	RecordTV

=== Internet ===
Year	Title	Role	Notes
2010–19	Guilherme Seta	Himself	YouTube Channel
2016	Galera do Condomínio	Felipe	Webseries on YouTube

=== Video clips ===
Year	Title	Artist
2012	Falta Coragem	Condução do Sistema
2018	Meu Crush	BFF Girls

== Theater ==
Year	Title	Role
2013	Show Carrossel no Circo Tihany	Davi Rabinovich
2013	A Árvore Berenice	João
2015	As crianças mais amadas do Brasil	Himself
2017	Mary Poppins	Michael Banks
2017	Wicked: musical	
2017	As Bruxas de Eastwick	
2017	O Príncipe das Fadas	Prince

== Discography ==
Year	Song	Album
2012	A Banda	Carrossel
2013	Filhote do Filhote	Carrossel
2014	Os Super-Heróis	Patrulha Salvadora
2015	Carro-Céu	Carrossel: O Filme
2015	PanaPaná	Carrossel: O Filme
2015	Amiguinho	Carrossel: O Filme
2016	De Zero a Dez	Carrossel 2: O Sumiço de Maria Joaquina

== Awards and nominations ==
Year	Association	Category	Nominated work	Result
2012	Prêmio Magnífico	Television Highlight of the Year	Carrossel	Won
2012	Telinha da TV Destaques	Best Child Actor	Carrossel	Nominated
2014	Prêmio Contigo! de TV	Best Child Actor	Patrulha Salvadora	Nominated
2017	Rio WebFest	Best Child and Youth Actor	Galera do Condomínio	Won
2020	Prêmio Notícias de TV	Best Child Actor	Topíssima	Nominated
