= Show do Tom =

- Genre: Comedy, talk show
- Created by: Tom Cavalcante
- Developed by: Tom Cavalcante
- Directed by: Vildomar Batista
- Presented by: Tom Cavalcante
- Starring: Alexandre Frota; Tom Cavalcante; Shaolin; Tiririca; Solange Damasceno and others...
- Country of origin: Brazil
- Original language: Portuguese

Original release
- Network: Rede Record
- Release: 26 September 2004 – 18 December 2012

Show do Tom was a Brazilian comedy and talk show aired by RecordTV and launched on September 26, 2004. On its debut, the program was on Saturday at 5pm, but later aired at 11pm. The programming also changed; originally, the content was recommended free for all, but now is only recommended for children over 10 years of age.

== History ==
Tom Cavalcante (host) left Rede Globo in July, 2004. In the same year, he started a solo program on RecordTV. Directed by Vildomar Batista, Show do Tom obtained 10 points in IBOPE.

Since he was forbidden by justice of presenting the same numbers he used at Rede Globo, he began to do sketches of big productions such as O Aprendiz, hosted by Roberto Justus in Brazil. The principal comedic style of the show is improvisational comedy, with emphasis on local talents (or sometimes local street figures) or well-known celebrities. Humourists such as Tiririca and Pedro Manso were hired for the show.

== Cast ==
- Tom Cavalcante
- Solange Damasceno
- Shaolin
- Tiririca
- Alexandre Frota

== Sketches (parodies) ==
- Mister Geme a Volta do Magico Descarado (parody of Mister M, the Masked Magician);
- Sítio Light: Mudando pra Roça (parody of The Simple Life, from Fox Life);
- Demais pra Você — Com Ana Maria Bela e Galinho José (parody of Mais Você, hosted by Ana Maria Braga);
- Avião do Tom;
- Festival de Piadas;
- Pocket Show/Sofá do Tom;
- O Infeliz - (parody of The Apprentice, in Brazil it's hosted by Roberto Justus);
- Arquivo Tomfidencial;
- Bar do Canabrava;
- Batalha dos Humoristas.
