= Tiririca =

Brazilian actor, comedian, humorist, politician and singer

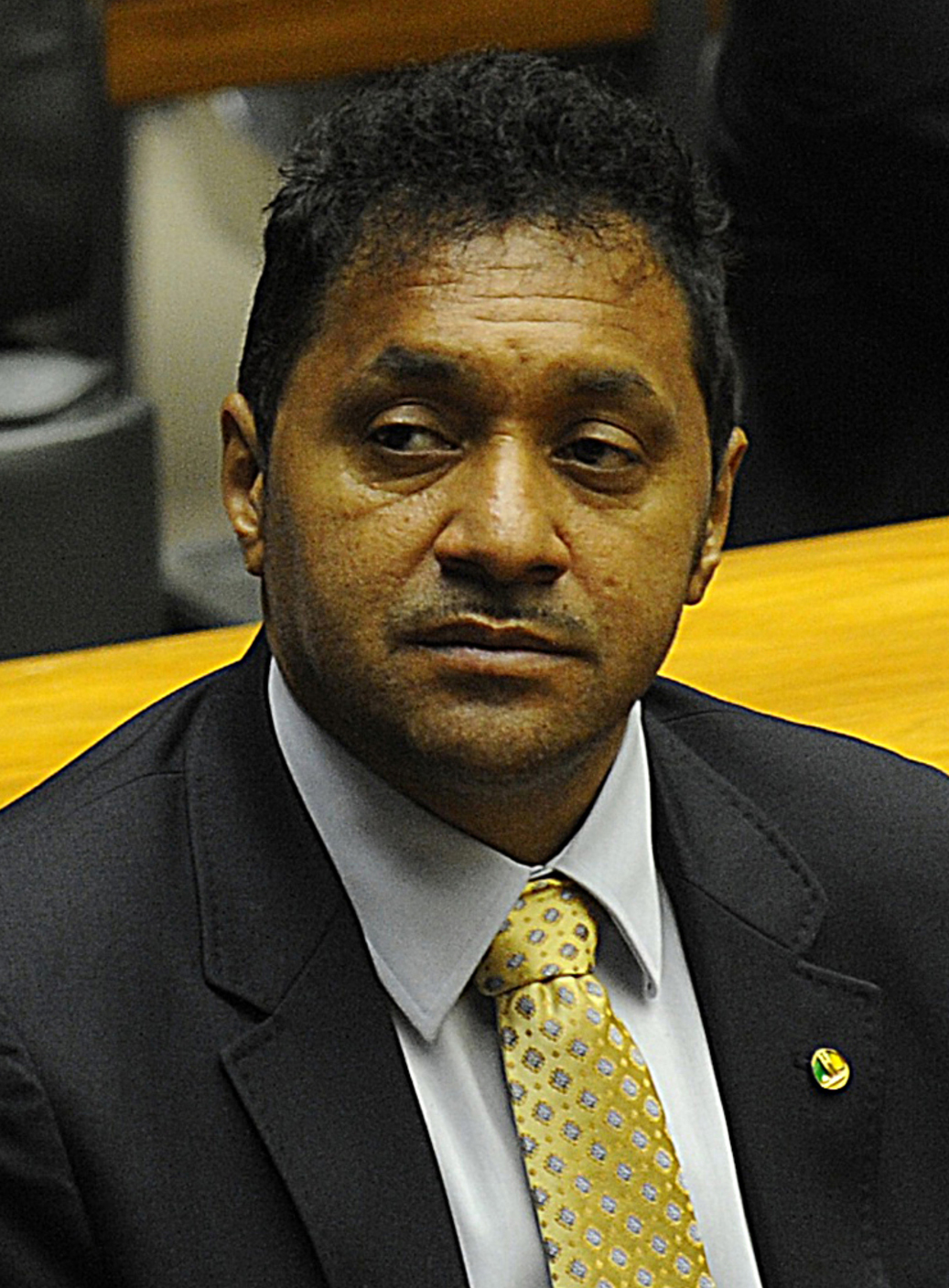
- Tiririca in 2011

Member of the Chamber of Deputies
- Incumbent
- Assumed office 1 February 2011
- Constituency: São Paulo

Personal details
- Born: Francisco Everardo Oliveira Silva; 1 May 1965 (age 61) Itapipoca, Ceará, Brazil
- Party: PSD (since 2025)
- Other political affiliations: PL (2010–2025)
- Spouses: Regione Brito (div. 1987) Rogéria Márcia (div. 1998) Nana Magalhães (m. 2017)
- Profession: Politician; Comedian; Singer; Songwriter; Composer; Clown
- Musical career
- Also known as: Tiririca
- Genre: Comedy
- Instruments: Vocals
- Years active: 1973–present
- Labels: Sony Music; Indie Records
- Website: www.tiriricanaweb.com.br

Francisco Everardo Oliveira Silva (born 1 May 1965), best known by his stage name Tiririca, is a Brazilian actor, clown, comedian, humorist, politician and singer-songwriter. He currently represents the state of São Paulo as a representative in the Chamber of Deputies of the National Congress of Brazil.

Tiririca first met national prominence as a singer-songwriter, when his first album Florentina (1997) topped charts. Proving to be a one-hit wonder, he abandoned his musical career after recording two more albums and started work as an actor and comedian in television. Later, again received attention in Brazilian media in 2010, during his run for representative for São Paulo in the lower house Congress. As a protest, many people voted him, a clown, for a congressman.

== Early life and career ==
Born in Itapipoca, Ceará, to an extremely poor family, Silva began working at the age of six. When he was eight years old, after seeing a circus performing in his home town, Tiririca joined them and started working as a clown. His stage name "Tiririca" (meaning "coco-grass") dates from this period; his mother coined it in idiomatic reference to his very strong, bitter, ill-tempered personality as a child.

Following the success of his comedy singing performances in local circuses, his circus-owner employer – along with local businessmen – sponsored the production of his first album and distribution of its first 1,000 copies. Soon his album met regional success in Brazil's Northeast, selling 1.5 million certified copies; this aroused the attention of larger record companies, such as Sony Music, who bought the record and launched it nationally in 1997. Just a few weeks following the national launch, Florentina broke charts sales records previous established by Mamonas Assassinas. Tiririca also broke television-audience records whenever he appeared.

His first album also gave rise to media controversy; it contained the song "Veja os cabelos dela" (English: "look at her hair"), considered racist by some observers. Following a lawsuit for racism, the album was seized from stores by a court order and the song suffered an unofficial ban from major radio stations. Tiririca was eventually acquitted of the charges, but the album was nevertheless re-released without the song.

Tiririca also went on to record two more albums – Tiririca (1997) and Dança da Rapadura (1999). Both failed to match Florentina's sales. From 1999 onwards, excepting a short 2004 hiatus, Tiririca focused on his career as an actor and comedian.

After leaving SBT in 2004, Tiririca recorded the album Alegria do Forró, which was a commercial failure.

== Television work ==
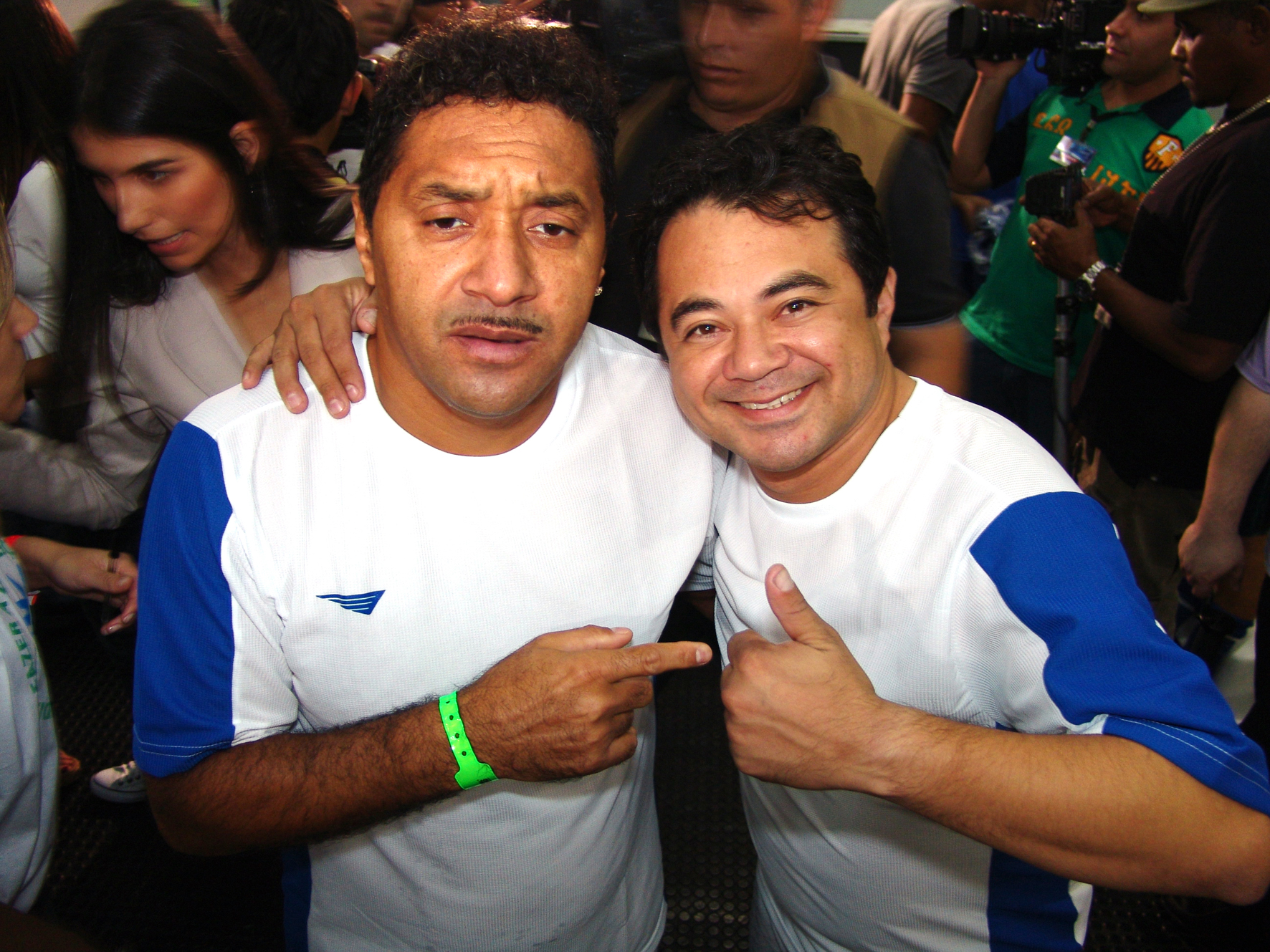
Tiririca with comedian Shaolin in 2004.

With his musical career on decline, Tiririca appeared in the comedy TV show Vila do Tiririca, broadcast on now-defunct Rede Manchete. In late 1999, he became a cast member of Rede Record's comedy series Escolinha do Barulho. After that show's cancellation in 2002, he transferred to SBT, where he was granted a comedy segment in A Praça é Nossa.

Following a hiatus, he returned to Rede Record in 2006 after being invited by fellow comedian and personal friend Tom Cavalcante to take part in his Show do Tom. Tiririca again met national success with his character "008" on the Bofe de Elite segment of Show do Tom, a parody of José Padilha's Tropa de Elite series.

== Political career ==
In 2010, Tiririca announced he would run in the 2010 Brazilian general elections for representative from São Paulo in the Chamber of Deputies after being invited to run by the Brazilian Republic Party. His electoral ads portrayed him in his Tiririca persona and used satirical and alliterative slogans, including "O que é que faz um deputado federal? Na realidade, eu não sei. Mas vote em mim que eu te conto" (English: "What does a federal congressman do? Actually, I don't know – but vote for me and I'll tell you"), "Pior que está não fica, vote no Tiririca" ("It can't get any worse, vote Tiririca") and even "Se eleito prometo ajudar todas as famílias brasileiras... especialmente a minha" ("If elected I promise to help all Brazilian families... especially mine").

Such slogans moved a group of state congressional candidates to file complaints with the electoral attorney's office, stating Tiririca was insulting the National Congress and all public offices with his lack of political projects and also his satirical attitude towards the election and politics. The complaint, however, was dismissed by the office.

Tiririca was denounced as an illiterate by Época in its 24 September 2010 edition. This statement, if true, would invalidate his candidacy. Soon after the release of the Época edition that claimed Tiririca's illiteracy, prosecutor Maurício Lopes sued Tiririca for forging his signature in his candidacy forms. Despite the trial having not yet taken place and all the negative media attention about his alleged illiteracy, on 3 October 2010, Tiririca became the most-voted-for congressman in the 2010 Brazilian general elections (and the second-most-voted-for in Brazilian history, after Enéas Carneiro), winning his seat for São Paulo with 1,348,295 votes (6.35 percent of electors).

On 30 October 2010, Tiririca's defense team alleged that he suffered from dysgraphia, which prevented him from holding a pen firmly. They further alleged that Tiririca's wife helped him write the literacy statement in his own hand, as demanded by Brazilian electoral law. She is said to have placed her hand over his to help him hold the pen firmly as he was writing. Also due to this condition, the defense said, Tiririca could not take any writing tests.

The explanation, however, runs contrary to a video recorded by Época in September and the accompanying statement that gave rise to the suspicions of illiteracy. The pictures show Tiririca giving his autograph to a fan. The magazine narrates, "Tiririca secures a notebook with his left hand and scribbles a circular signature with his right hand. He further writes the letters for his name, and shows no trouble whatsoever holding the pen".

Following a court order, Tiririca underwent a simple reading and writing test on 11 November 2010, which found that he was indeed literate. Although the prosecutor appealed against this decision, claiming the thirty-percent score in the test was too low to be acceptable as proof, federal judge Walter de Almeida Guilherme rejected the appeal.

Thus, Tiririca was inaugurated under heavy applause by those present in the ceremony on 17 December 2010. That same day Tiririca revealed his political project, focused primarily in cultural advancement, namely helping circus artists, financing cultural projects, increasing federal funds allotted to primary education, and legally fighting prejudice against his fellow Northeastern people.

In December 2017, Tiririca stated that he would not run in the 2018 general election, citing that he was too embarrassed by his colleagues. After that, the deputy announced that he would run for reelection in the 2018 elections. In the general election on 7 October he was re-elected to a third term. In 2022, he was re-elected with 71,754 votes, the lowest of any candidate in São Paulo to be elected.

== See also ==
- List of Brazilian actors
- List of Brazilian politicians
- List of comedians
- List of humorists
- List of singer-songwriters
