= Rosanne Mulholland =

Brazilian actress (born 1980)

- Mulholland in 2016
- Born: Rosanne Santos Mulholland; 31 December 1980 (age 45); Brasília, DF, Brazil
- Other name: Rosanne Holland
- Occupations: Actress; writer
- Years active: 1997–present
- Height: 1.67 m (5 ft 6 in)
- Father: Timothy Mulholland

Rosanne Santos Mulholland (born 31 December 1980) is a Brazilian actress and writer.

Known for playing Teacher Helena in the 2012 remake of the soap opera Carrossel.

From the short 14 Bis (2006), she began to sign her real surname, Mulholland. In previous films she signed Rosanne Holland, believing it was easier to pronounce.

The director of the film Falsa Loura (2007), Carlos Reichenbach, said about her: "This girl is a volcano, wonderful; she adapts to any role, she has freshness, she has a universal face." At the time of the release of Falsa Loura, the film in which she starred, she was called, by celebrity websites, "the new darling of national cinema".

== Biography ==
Rosanne Mulholland was born in Brasília, on 31 December 1980, the firstborn of the former rector of the University of Brasília, Timothy Mulholland, and Lurdisceia Santos. Until the age of 13, he lived with his grandparents, missionaries of the Baptist Church.

== Career ==
She began acting in theater when she was just 12 years old and later started doing commercials for colleges and shopping malls for television, to the point of declaring: "There, [in Brasília], I was already becoming known as the "girl in the commercial". During this period she met fellow countryman José Eduardo Belmonte, who would later hire her in Rio de Janeiro.

She made her film debut with the short film Dez Dias Felizes (2002), whose script was also written by Belmonte, followed by Araguaya - Conspiração do Silêncio, which was filmed while she was still studying psychology at the Centro Universitário de Brasília (UniCEUB). The first time she went to Rio de Janeiro, she received an invitation from Belmonte to film A Concepción and ended up returning to Brasília, where she stayed for two months. In 2004, she moved permanently to an apartment in Leblon, in Rio's South Zone, with the intention of specializing in Gestalt psychology and investing in her acting career. She didn't finish her specialization, he starred in some commercials and acted in two plays, Amor com Amor Se Paga and A Glória de Nelson. She also attended Rede Globo's actors' workshop, took theater classes with Daniel Herz, at Casa de Cultura Laura Alvim, until she was chosen to act in A Concepção, after being tested by Belmonte. The poster for this film became the cover of the May 2006 edition (nº 66) of Revista de Cinema.

Regarding the film Falsa Loura, she told the G1 portal: "I had never imagined in my life playing the role of a proletarian, totally different from me. It was a great challenge." Her interpretation moved Reichenbach to the point of making him change the script to give Mulholland's character a happier ending and he explained: "She brought such great dignity to the role that I had to change everything; she gave a new meaning to the role." protagonist and, consequently, for the story". During the open screening of the film at the 40th Brasília Festival, the actress received a standing ovation in the scene in which her character (Silmara) has a dream about her idol, a singer played by Maurício Mattar, while the subtitles show the lyrics of the song so that the audience follow.

From 2007 onwards, when she participated in the soap opera Sete Pecados, she became more recognized by the general public. In April 2008, she moved to the capital of São Paulo to record the soap opera Água na Boca, on Rede Bandeirantes. In the plot, she gave life to her first protagonist on television, Danielle Cassoulet, of French descent, is the chef of the Paris restaurant, and lives a romance "à la Romeo and Juliet" with Luca, an Italian, they fall in love, despite belonging to rival families.

In 2010 Rosanne was on the journalistic program A Liga on Rede Bandeirantes alongside Rafinha Bastos, Débora Vilalba and Thaíde.

In 2011, she began recording for the SBT soap opera, Carrossel, to play the protagonist, Helena Fernandes, a teacher who teaches the third year of Elementary Education at Escola Mundial. Sweet, sweet, fair and at the same time modern, she captivates everyone wherever she goes, she is the personification of everything that is good and correct. The young teacher was a tutor, friend and mother to her students. It awakens the passion of teacher René and the anger of director Olivia and teacher Suzana. In an interview she commented: "When I found out I would play the teacher, I was scared." In 2012, she joined the cast of the film Menos que Nada with the role of René. In October 2012, she received the Jovem Brasileiro Award for best actress, for her performance in the soap opera Carrossel

In 2014, she returned to Globo, and was cast to play her first villain, Débora in Alto Astral. In 2018, she filmed the film Mudança by Fabiano de Souza. In 2019, she was in Malhação Toda Forma de Amar, playing its second villain, Lara Pinheiro, a rising, workaholic, ambitious and competitive lawyer. The lawyer makes the life of the protagonist and young girl Rita, played by Alanis Guillen, miserable, due to her custody of the baby who was adopted by her sister, Lígia, played by Paloma Duarte.

== Personal life ==
She was married for 12 years to the drummer of musician Jay Vaquer's band, Kelder Paiva. Their relationship ended in 2016.

In September 2017, during Rock in Rio VII, she started dating actor Marcos Veras. In 2020, the couple announced that Rosanne is pregnant. Davi, the couple's first child, was born on 9 August, Father's Day, in Rio de Janeiro.

== Filmography ==
=== Television ===
Year	Title	Role	Notes
2004	Celebridade	Rosana	Episodes: "June 23–24"
2006	JK	Maria Luísa Lemos	
2007	Sete Pecados	Daniella Silvino	
2008	Água na Boca	Danielle Cassoulet	
2009	Cilada	Michelle	Episode: "A Cafona"
2009	Tudo Novo de Novo	Nina	Episode: "Ensina-me a Namorar"
2009	A Grande Família	Bianquinha	Episode: "Demorô, Já é!"
2010	Separação?!	Júlia	Episode: "Paranoia"
2010	A Liga	Presenter	
2011	Autor por Autor	Julieta Moraes Cony	Episode: "Carlos Heitor Cony"
2011	Autor por Autor	Chronicler's Muse	Episode: "Carlos Heitor Cony"
2012	Carrossel	Teacher Helena Fernandes	
2012	A Praça É Nossa	Teacher Helena Fernandes	Episode: "June 21"
2013	Carrossel Especial de Natal	Teacher Helena Fernandes	End of year special
2014	Alto Astral	Débora Lara	
2019	Malhação: Toda Forma de Amar	Lara Pinheiro	Season 27
2023	A Sogra que te Pariu	Debby	Episode: "Esqueceram de Mim"

=== Film ===
Year	Title	Role	Notes
2002	Dez Dias Felizes	Girlfriend	Short-film
2004	Araguaya - Conspiração do Silêncio	Criméia Alice	
2004	Madame Pessoa	Blonde	Short-film
2005	A Concepção	Liz	
2006	Nome Próprio	Paula	
2006	14 Bis	Lantelme	Short-film
2007	Meu Mundo em Perigo	Isis	
2007	O Magnata	Dri	
2007	Falsa Loura	Silmara	
2008	Bellini e o Demônio	Gala	
2010	Sonhos de Lulu	Louise Brooks	Short-film
2010	Nosso Lar, O Filme	Heloísa	
2010	50 anos em 5	Narrator	Short-film
2011	AUN: The Beginning and the End of All Things	Nympha	
2011	As Doze Estrelas	Vitória Mendes	
2011	Signo de Ouro	Veronika	
2012	Menos que Nada	René	
2014	Lar Doce Lar	Broker	Short-film
2016	Carrossel 2: O Sumiço de Maria Joaquina	Teacher Helena Fernandes	
2016	Entre Idas e Vindas	Krisse	
2017	Homem Livre	Laura	
2017	Rota de Fuga	Vitória	
2018	O Candidato Honesto 2	Amanda	
2018	Tudo Acaba em Festa	Aline	
2019	Bio - Construindo uma Vida	Daughter / Neuroscientist	
2020	Mudança	Mônica	
2022	A Espera de Liz	Lara	
2022	Cartório das Almas		

== Theater ==
Year	Title	Role
1997	Romeo and Juliet	Juliet
1998	A Casa de Bernarda Alba	
1999	Somos o que Somos	
2002	Várias Maneiras de Enlouquecer um Homem	
2003	Várias Maneiras de Enlouquecer um Homem 2	
2004	Amor com Amor Se Paga	
2005	A Glória de Nelson	Dália, Glória
2007	O Mundo Maravilhoso de Dissocia	
2010	A Inevitável História de Letícia Diniz	Letícia Diniz
2011	Louise Valentina	Louise Valentina
2013–14	Os 39 Degraus	Annabella, Pamela e Margaret
2015	Juliette Castigada e Justine Recompensada	Justine
2017	Carrossel: O Musical	Teacher Helena Fernandes

== Literature ==
Year	Title	Gender	Publishing Company
2020	Para onde foi meu coração?	Children's	Novo Século

== Discography ==
=== Soundtrack ===
Year	Title	Album
2013	Todo Mundo	Carrossel Especial Astros
2013	Todo Mundo (Remix)	Carrossel, Vol. 3 (Remixes)

== Awards and nominations ==
Year	Award	Category	Work nominated	Result
2007	Festival de Brasília do Cinema Brasileiro	Best Actress	Falsa Loura	Nominated
2008	Prêmio Contigo! de Cinema Nacional	Best Actress (official jury)	Falsa Loura	Won
2008	Prêmio Contigo! de Cinema Nacional	Best Actress (popular jury)	Falsa Loura	Nominated
2008	Mostra de Cinema de Tiradentes	Baroque Trophy	Homage	Won
2008	Prêmio Contigo! de TV	Best New Actress	Sete Pecados	Nominated
2009	Prêmio Fiesp/Sesi-SP do Cinema Paulista	Best Actress	Falsa Loura	Won
2009	Prêmio Contigo! de TV	Best Soap Actress	Água na Boca	Nominated
2012	Prêmio Jovem Brasileiro	Best Actress	Carrossel	Won
2012	UOL Pop Tevê	Best Actress	Carrossel	Nominated
2012	Prêmio MZoTV	Best Actress	Carrossel	Won
2013	Prêmio Contigo! de TV	Best Actress	Carrossel	Nominated
2013	Troféu Internet	Best Actress	Carrossel	Nominated
2020	Grande Prêmio Brasileiro de Cinema	Best Supporting Actress	Homem Livre	Nominated
2020	Festival Sesc Melhores Filmes	Best National Actress	Homem Livre	Nominated
2023	Festival Sesc Melhores Filmes	Best National Actress	A Espera de Liz	Pending
