= Meu Ritmo =

2017 song by MC Loma

Single by MC Loma
- Released: December 10, 2017
- Genre: Pop; Brega; Arrocha-funk
- Length: 1:08
- Songwriter: Mirella Santos Silva

MC Loma singles chronology
"Meu Ritmo" (2017)	"Envolvimento" (2018)

"Meu Ritmo" (transl. My Rhythm) was Brazilian singer MC Loma's debut music video released in December 2017. Originally posted on her cousins' "Canal Descontraídas" YouTube Channel (the Gêmeas Lacração channel), this video went viral. While it was later deleted due to copyright issues, the original content was recovered by the singer and, as a result, many clips remain to live on various YouTube channels.

== Story ==
As the video begins, MC Loma and her dancers (her cousins, the "Gêmeas Lacração") dancing in front of a train. Another scene shows the singer lying on a green background with lipstick of the same color. In some scenes, she dances alone outside of her house, and in one scene she is dressed as a DJ.

== DJ Torricelli version ==
"Meu Ritmo"

Single by MC Loma e as Gêmeas Lacração and DJ Torricelli
- Language: Portuguese
- Released: March 2, 2018
- Genre: Brega-funk
- Length: 2:37

MC Loma e as Gêmeas Lacração singles chronology
"Na Vibe" (2018)	"Meu Ritmo" (2018)	"Paralisa" (2018)

DJ Torricelli singles chronology
"Na Vibe" (2018)	"Meu Ritmo" (2018)	"Tá Achando" (2018)

Music video
- "Meu Ritmo" on YouTube

"Meu Ritmo" is a remix of the song with the same name by the Brazilian girl band, MC Loma e as Gêmeas Lacração and the Brazilian DJ Torricelli. This remix was selected by fans during a media campaign.

=== Story ===
The video was produced and released by the "Start World" YouTube channel, which belongs to the record label that would eventually sign the band. Like many other videos of her songs, this one is notable for its comedic elements. At the outset, girls are eating desserts in a candy store. A couple (played by Brazilian YouTuber's Muca Muriçoca and Carol Dias) are arguing close to the girls, because the boy was paying more attention to the girls in the candy store than to his girlfriend. Afterwards, the scene changes to show MC Loma talking on her phone. The girl band is dancing while the DJ plays the piano. At the end of the video, the man justifies looking at the girls by saying he wanted the sweets the singers were eating. In the end, the Brazilian journalist Dudu Camargo records the girls sitting at the table while the couple stands with them. The couple eventually reconcile, and everyone is happy. This version is by DJ Toricelli.

=== Deleted clip ===
The video clip was released on the "Start World" YouTube Channel, before the account was hacked and the video clip deleted.

=== Controversy ===
In the video, Camargo (a contentious figure at that time due to his involvement in the 2018 Primero Impacto controversy), makes an appearance at the end. His appearance created public backlash. The "Start World" channel was hacked, likely as a result of this, and the video was taken down, only to be put back up the following day.
