= Gaga de Ilhéus =

Brazilian actress and humorist

- Born: Solange Damasceno Santana; February 2, 1953 (age 73); Ilhéus, Bahia, Brazil
- Occupations: Actress; Comedian
- Years active: 2004–present

Solange Damasceno Santana (Ilhéus, February 2, 1953), known as Gaga de Ilhéus, is a Brazilian actress and comedian.

== Career ==
Solange became known nationally in 2004, after participating in a radio program in Ilhéus. In the program, she complained about the problems in her city, and Solange's arguments and stuttering drew attention. The video ended up on YouTube and Solange became an instant celebrity at the time, which made her participate in several television programs and be part of the cast of extinct Show do Tom, on TV Record.

She has a sister named Cremilda Santana, who also stutters and has already participated with her in programs such as As Gagas de Ilhéus. They were successful in the program Pânico na Band from 2015 to 2017, with the sketches As Gagas de Ilhéus, Desempregagas and Largagas e Peladas.

== Filmography ==
=== Television ===
Year	Title	Role	Notes
2007	Márcia	Herself	
2007	Custe o Que Custar	Herself	
2008	Hebe	Reporter	1 episode
2008	Pânico na TV	Herself	
2008	Show do Tom	Various	
2014	Hoje em Dia	Herself	
2015	Pânico na Band	Various	
2016	Programa do Ratinho	Herself	
2017	Domingo Legal	Sworn	2 episodes
2017	The Noite com Danilo Gentili	Herself	
2018	Multi Tom	Deputada Gaga	
2019	Hora do Faro	Herself	
2019	Topíssima	Dona Solange	1 episode
