= Tom Cavalcante =

Brazilian actor

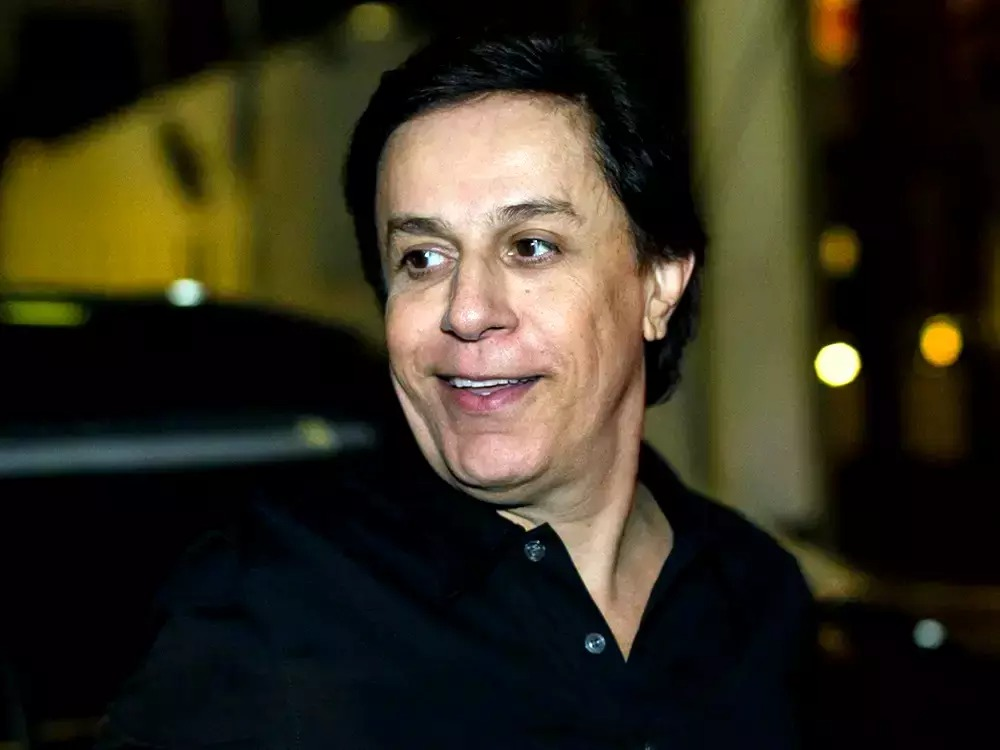
- Tom Cavalcante
- Born: Antônio José Rodrigues Cavalcante; March 8, 1962 (age 64); Fortaleza, Ceará, Brazil
- Other name: Tom
- Occupations: Comedian and actor
- Years active: 1984—present
- Known for: Characters João Canabrava and Ribamar; Os Parças
- Spouse(s): Zélia Maria Queiroz (1984-93); Patrícia Lamounier (1997-present)
- Children: 3

Antônio José Rodrigues Cavalcante (born March 8, 1962) is a Brazilian actor and comedian, who is known professionally as Tom Cavalcante.

== Early life ==
Cavalcante was born in Fortaleza, Ceará, Brazil on March 8, 1962, as Antônio José Rodrigues Cavalcante.

== Career ==
Cavalcante began his career in 1976, performing in bars in his home state of Ceará doing humor skits and impressions of various artists. In 1982, Tom went to Rio de Janeiro and asked for a job on television, but he was turned down. In 1984, he tried to participate in the SBT Show de Calouros talent show, but he was not selected by the production to perform on stage. In the same year, he got a job as a radio broadcaster at Rádio Verdes Mares, where he presented the comedy show Ligação Direta for five years. During the 1986 elections, he worked by opening political rallies with comic skits. In 1987, he presented the television newsprogrm VM Notícias, on the Rede Globo-affiliate TV Verdes Mares. In 1989, he met Chico Anysio, who invited him to return to Rio de Janeiro to participate in the Chico Anysio Show. With the program's end, he began to participate in another of Chico's shows: Escolinha do Professor Raimundo, where he played the drunkard João Canabrava, a character created by himself. In 1996, Daniel Filho invited him to participate in Sai de Baixo, playing the doorman Ribamar. From 1999 to 2001, he worked in Globo's comedy shows Zorra Total and Megatom.

Unsatisfied with his treatment by Globo, Cavalcante resigned from the station and signed with TV Record, where he presented his own program, Show do Tom, from 2004 to 2011. In 2013, Cavalcante and his family moved to the United States, where he worked on the short film Pizza Me, Mafia, directed by Gui Pereira. Cavalcante returned to Brazil in 2014, and made an appearance on Globo's Domingão do Faustão, eleven years after being banned by the station.

Since 2016, Cavalcante presented at Globosat's cable channel Multishow in the shows #PartiuShopping and Multi Tom, where he performed as several characters, among them Tomsonaro (an impression of president Jair Bolsonaro). He presented and hosted the show Todos os Toms in September 2019 at the Riomar Theater. and starred in the 2017 comedy film Os Parças.

== Filmography ==
=== Films ===
Year	Title	Role	Note(s)	Type
1995	TV Colosso Especial	-	-	TV movie
1995	Xuxa Especial: Deu a Louca na Fantasia	Príncipe	-	Full-length film
2003	Xuxa in Abracadabra	Narrator	-	Full-length film
2005	Xuxinha and Guto Against the Space Monsters	Douglas Wonder	Voice role	Full-length film
2013	Pizza Me Mafia	Joe Calzone / Tom Calzone / Mama Calzone	Nominated for and won an award	Short movie
2017	Os Parças	Toinho	-	Full-length film
2019	Sai de Baixo: O Filme	Ribamar / Jaula	-	Full-length film
2019	Os Parças 2	Toinho	Pre-production	Full-length film

=== TV series ===
Year	Title	Role	Note(s)
1987	A Praça é Nossa	João Canabrava	-
1990	Escolinha do Professor Raimundo	João Canabrava	-
1991	Estados Anysios de Chico City	-	-
1996	Sai de Baixo	Ribamar	-
1999	Zorra Total	Pitbicha / Ribamar / João Canabrava	-
2000	Megatom	-	-
2004	Show do Tom	-	-
2007	Tela Class	-	-
2007	Louca Família	Tóla	-
2014	Trair e Coçar é Só Começar	Primo	-
2015	#PartiuShopping	Gildo	-
2015	Tomara que Caia	João Canabrava / Ribamar	-
2016	Casa dos Políticos	Pedro Miau	Mini-series
2016	Multi Tom	-	-
2018	Tá no Ar: A TV na TV	João Canabrava	-
2018	Dra. Darci	Dra. Darci	-
2021	LOL: Se Rir, Já Era	Presenter	

== Awards and nominations ==
Year	Award	Category	For	Result
1992	Troféu Imprensa	Best Newcomer	Escolinha do Professor Raimundo	Nominated
1992	Troféu Imprensa	Best Male Comedian	Escolinha do Professor Raimundo	Won (tied with Luiz Fernando Guimarães
1993	Troféu Imprensa	Best Male Comedian	Escolinha do Professor Raimundo	Won
2004	Extra Television Awards	Best Comedian	Show do Tom	
2006	Prêmio Qualidade	Best Actor in a Comedy	Show do Tom	
2007	Prêmio Qualidade	Best Actor in a Comedy	Show do Tom	
2008	Prêmio Qualidade	Best Actor in a Comedy	Show do Tom	
2009	Prêmio Contigo	Best Actor in a Comedy	Show do Tom	Won
2010	Prêmio Qualidade	Best Actor in a Comedy	Show do Tom	Nominated
2014	Brazil Cinefest	Best Short Movie	Pizza Me Mafia	Nominated
2015	Oregon International Film Awards	Best Short Movie	Pizza Me Mafia	Won
