= Funk ousadia =

Brazilian music style

- Other names: Funk picante
- Stylistic origins: Funk carioca; funk melody; funk ostentação
- Cultural origins: Early to mid-2010s, São Paulo, Brazil
- Typical instruments: Drum machine, turntable, sampler, synthesizer, vocal

Funk ousadia, (Note: Loosely translated as "daring funk") also referred to as funk picante, (Note: Loosely translated as "spicy funk") is a subgenre of the wider Brazilian funk scene, originating around 2013 in the city of São Paulo as an offshoot of the funk ostentação movement. Its lyrical matter is based upon erotic-themed songs with double entendres and humorous puns.

== Description ==
The genre has been called by several media outlets the successor of funk ostentação, which, following its initial boom in the late 2000s, was beginning to decline in popularity by 2013–14. The presence of humor in the songs differentiate this genre from songs by Mr. Catra and MC Magrinho, which have a clearer and more evident sex appeal.

Some of the genre's principal exponents are MC Pikachu, MC 2K, MC Bin Laden, MC Pedrinho and MC Brinquedo.
