= Funk ostentação =

Brazilian music style

- Other names: Funk paulista
- Stylistic origins: Funk carioca; funk melody; proibidão
- Cultural origins: Mid- to late 2000s, São Paulo, Brazil
- Typical instruments: Drum machine, turntable, sampler, synthesizer, vocal
- Derivative forms: Funk ousadia

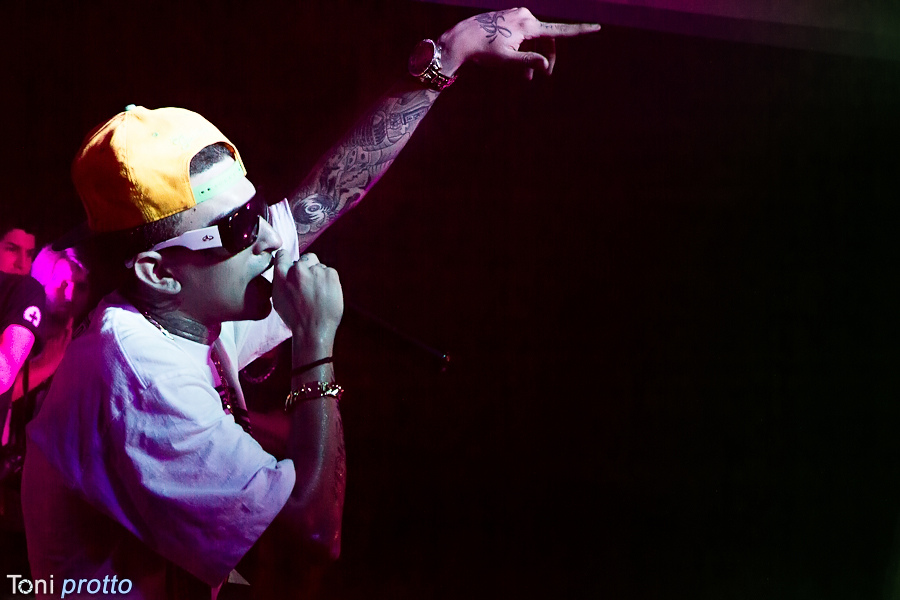
MC Guimê, a prominent funk ostentação artist.

Funk ostentação (pronounced [ˈfɐ̃k(i) ostẽtaˈsɐ̃w]; Portuguese for 'ostentation funk') is a Brazilian music style created in São Paulo in 2008. Strongly influenced by American hip-hop, the central theme addressed in the songs is conspicuous consumption, and many funk ostentação artists sing about cars, motorcycles, drink, women, and ambitions to leave the favela and achieve life goals.

While the dominant lyrical themes of the Rio de Janeiro scene at the time were criminality and lack of social justice, the first funk ostentação song, "Bonde da Juju", recorded by MCs Backdi and Bio G3 in September 2008, established the new genre's opposing theme of ostentation. Several funk ostentação festivals were subsequently held in the state of São Paulo, and the movement began to grow. Its national debut came with the launch of the video for "Megane" by MC Boy do Charmes in mid-2011. As it became clear that funk ostentação would be best represented in audiovisual format, the cinematographer KondZilla became the first to produce videos, which were received enthusiastically by fans. Of the ten most watched music videos in Brazil in both 2012 and 2013, three were funk ostentação.

It was established as one of the most popular genres in Brazil with the death of Daniel Pellegrine also known as MC Daleste, who was shot on stage in Campinas in July 2013. He had been one of the principal proponents of the genre at the time of his death, and its extensive media coverage included widely televised tributes by other funk artists.

Funk ostentação became strongly associated with the emerging nova classe média (new middle class) in Brazil.
