= KondZilla =

Brazilian YouTuber

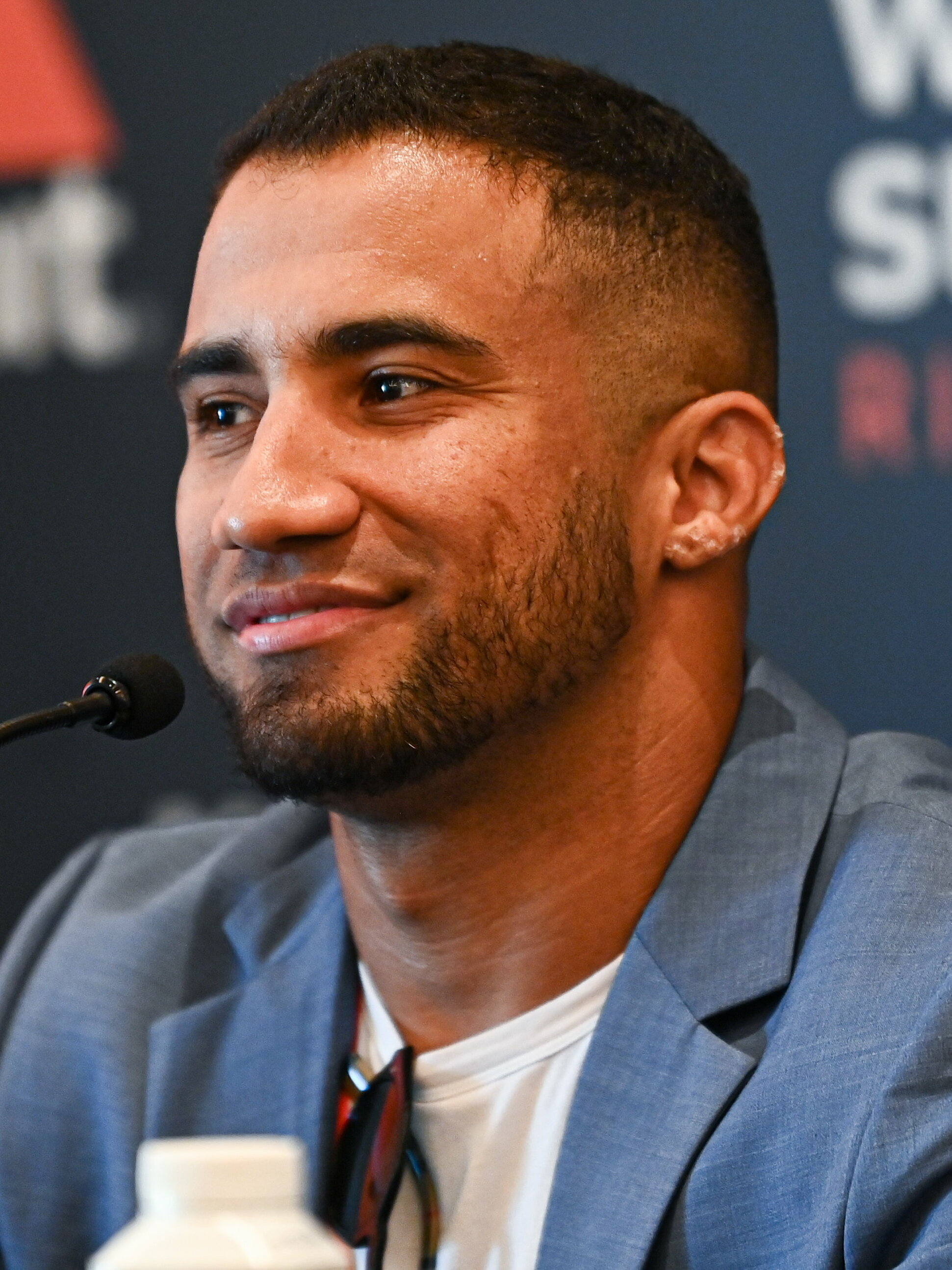
- KondZilla in 2023
- Born: Konrad Cunha Dantas; 13 September 1988 (age 37); Guarujá, São Paulo, Brazil

YouTube information
- Channel: KondZilla
- Years active: 2012–present
- Genre: Music videos
- Subscribers: 68.2 million
- Views: 40.71 billion
- Last updated: 9 July 2026

Konrad Cunha Dantas (Brazilian Portuguese: [ˈkõʁadʒi ˈkũɲɐ ˈdɐ̃tɐs]; born 13 September 1988), better known by the stage name KondZilla (pronounced [ˌkõdʒiˈzilɐ]), or just KOND, is a Brazilian screenwriter and director. He is the founder of KondZilla Records, which is a music video production company and record label often credited for being the main popularizer of funk ostentação. He currently owns the largest YouTube channel in Brazil and Latin America, and the third largest music channel in the world, with 68.1 million subscribers and 40.5 billion views. In addition to his music videos, he is also the creator and director of the Netflix drama Sintonia.

Among the artists who have worked with KondZilla are funk, rock bands and rap artists such as: MC Guimê, DJ Marlboro, Mr. Catra, Charlie Brown Jr., Karol Conka, Racionais MC's, and Aloe Blacc.

== Early life ==
Konrad Dantas was born in the city of Guarujá, São Paulo. His mother was a teacher and his father worked as a bricklayer. When he was 18 years old, he worked as a web designer at a university in Santos, São Paulo. At 18, his mother died, leaving him a sizable life insurance. He used some of this money to buy a Canon EOS 5D camera to pursue a career in video production. Dantas later moved to the city of São Paulo, where he studied cinematography, post-production and photography.

== Career ==
In 2017, KondZilla Records was integrated into Dantas's production company, which has existed since 2011. The label manages the career of artists such as Kevinho, MC Kekel, MC Guimê, MC Dede, Dani Russo, Mc Rodolfinho, Mc Mm; and launches their music videos on his channel.

KondZilla has produced more than 1000 music videos, and his YouTube channel has more than 50 million subscribers, which is almost half of the unique users of YouTube in Brazil and 22 percent of the Brazilian population. He also has more than 25 billion views on his YouTube channel. On 3 February 2018, he surpassed Whindersson Nunes, making him the largest Brazilian channel on YouTube by subscriber count.

KondZilla also directed the DVDs Música Popular Caiçara by rock band Charlie Brown Jr. and Imagination by MC Boy of Charmes.

== See also ==
- List of YouTubers
- List of most-subscribed YouTube channels
