= Hoje É Dia de Maria =

Brazilian television miniseries

- Also known as: Today Is Maria's Day
- Based on: short stories of brazilian folklore by Luís da Câmara Cascudo; Mário de Andrade; Sílvio Romero
- Story by: Luís Alberto de Abreu; Luiz Fernando Carvalho
- Directed by: Luiz Fernando Carvalho
- Starring: Carolina Oliveira; Letícia Sabatella; Rodrigo Santoro; Osmar Prado; Fernanda Montenegro
- Country of origin: Brazil
- Original language: Portuguese
- No. of episodes: 8

Original release
- Network: Rede Globo
- Release: January 11 – January 21, 2005

Hoje É Dia de Maria (English: Today Is Maria's Day) was a Brazilian miniseries directed and written by Luiz Fernando Carvalho, co-written by Luis Alberto de Abreu and Carlos Alberto Soffredini, basing themselves on a selection of stories taken from popular Brazilian oral storytelling tradition, collected by the writers Câmara Cascudo, Mário de Andrade and Sílvio Romero. It was produced in 8 episodes and exhibited in 2005 by Rede Globo.

Compared with To the Left of the Father on account of its innovative television language, it caught the attention of critics and public by its novel, theatrical and playful language in transporting the universe of popular culture to a sophisticated television production, without losing its authenticity. The critic Nilson Xavier considers it one of the most poetic, original and beautiful productions of recent years. According to Jean-Philippe Tessé, in the French magazine Cahiers du Cinéma, the mini-series was very ambitious and formally very well produced, following other noteworthy projects such as The Maias (Os Maias).

== Production ==
Art direction by Lia Renha, guest artist Raimundo Rodriguez, direction of photography by José Tadeu Ribeiro and costumes by Luciana Buarque. The 60 marionettes that represented the animals were produced by the Grupo Giramundo, from Minas Gerais state. The work marked the start of the partnership between the director and psychoanalyst Carlos Byington, as advisor on the mythological dramatization of the text. The mini-series was conceived under a 360º dome, scrap from a rock show stage. The sound track, by Tim Rescala, was based on cirandas (traditional dances) by Heitor Villa-Lobos, César Guerra-Peixe and Francisco Mignone. Designer Jum Nakao was responsible for some of the costumes, with animation of the stop-motion scenes by Cesar Coelho, founder of the Anima Mundi festival.

== Plot ==
This is a story filled with other stories. Hidden in our childhood memories, these stories still stay with us secretly, awaiting only the right moment to reappear. That's the substance of Maria's journey through the world, like a small Ulysses trying to get home to her parents.

== Cast ==
Actor/Actress	Character
Carolina Oliveira	Maria
Letícia Sabatella	Maria (adult)
Rodrigo Santoro	Amado
Osmar Prado	Pai
Daniel de Oliveira	Quirino
Emiliano Queiroz	Asmodeu (old)
André Valli	Asmodeu Mágico
Ricardo Blat	Asmodeu Sátiro
Marco Ricca	1st Cangaceiro
Charles Fricks	1st Executive / Police Officer
Leandro Castilho	2nd Executive
Rodolfo Vaz	Pato
Inês Peixoto	Rosa
Mário César Camargo	Seu Odorico
Ilya São Paulo	2nd Cangaceiro
Aramis Trindade	3rd Cangaceiro
Antônio Edson	Asmodeu Brincante
Denise Assunção	Mucama
João Sabiá	Asmodeu Lindo
Nanego Lira	Retirante
Thaynná Pina	Joaninha (child)
Laura Lobo	Menina Carvoeira
Phillipe Louis	Ciganinho
Luiz Damasceno	Asmodeu Poeta
Rafaella de Oliveira	Joaninha

Artistas especialmente convidados

Ator/Atriz	Personagem
Juliana Carneiro da Cunha	Mother
Stênio Garcia	Asmodeu
Gero Camilo	Zé Cangaia
Fernanda Montenegro	Stepmother

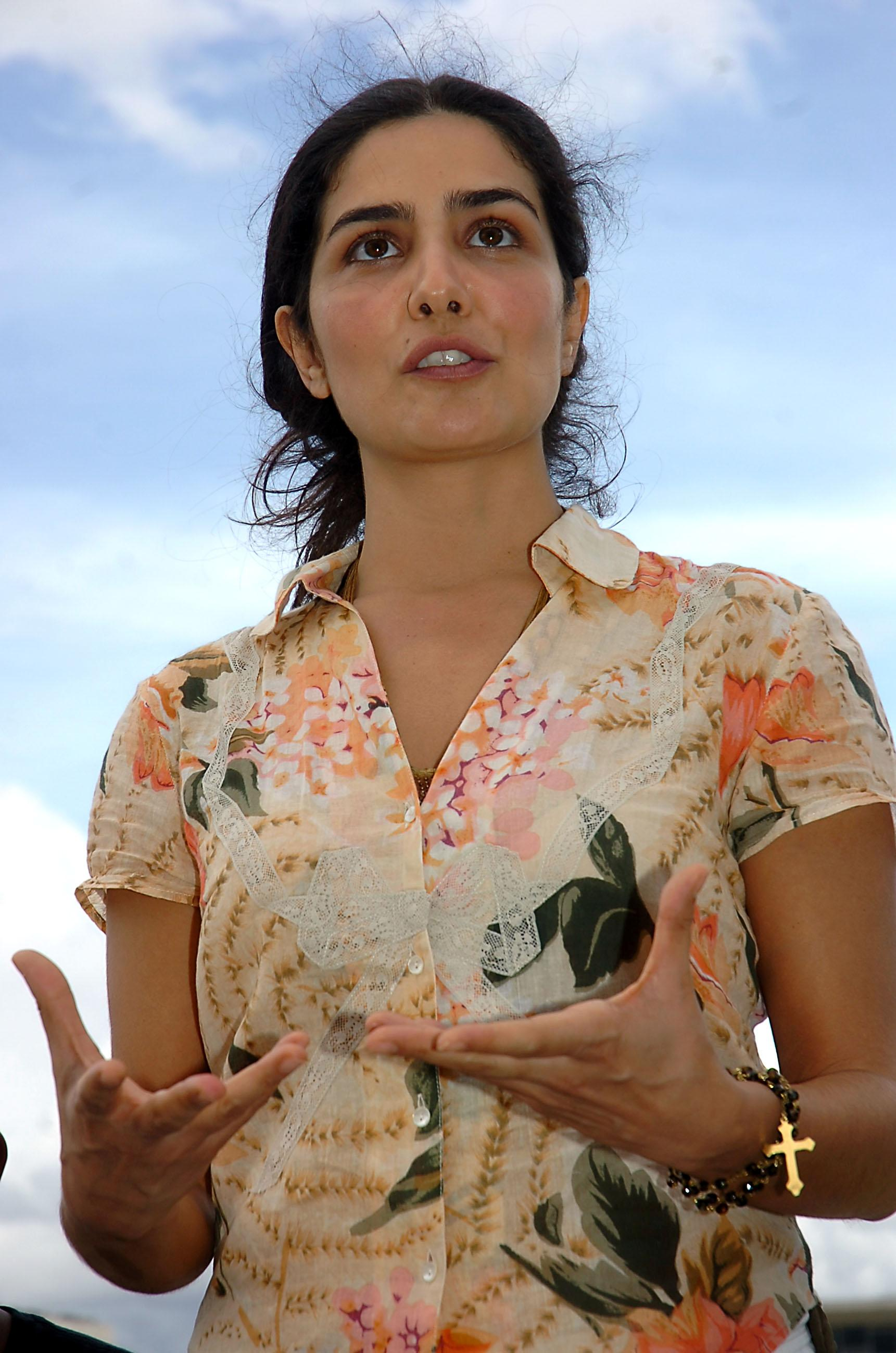
Letícia Sabatella
Maria adulta

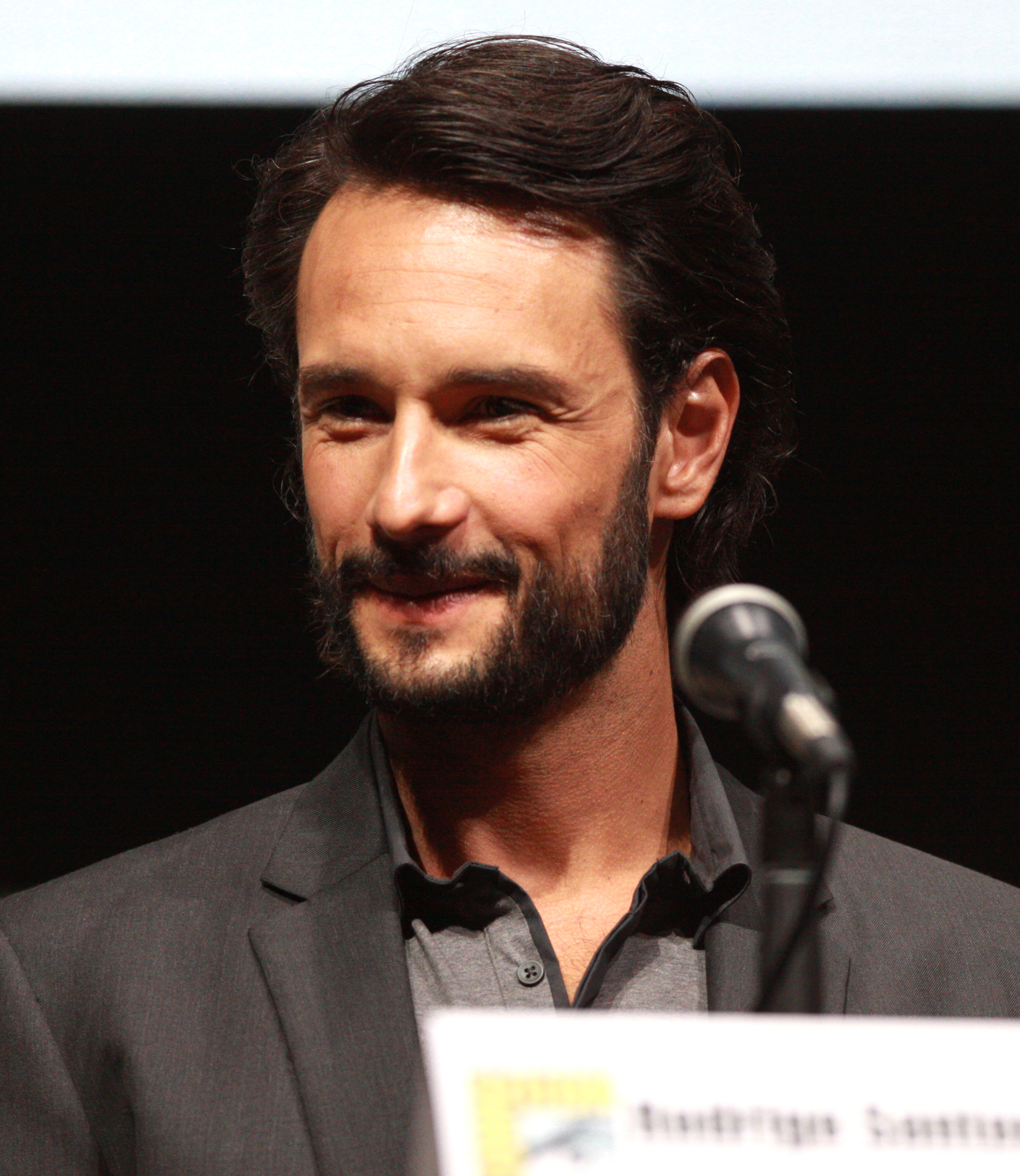
Rodrigo Santoro
Amado

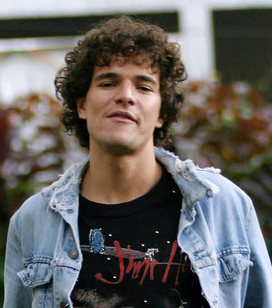
Daniel de Oliveira
Quirino

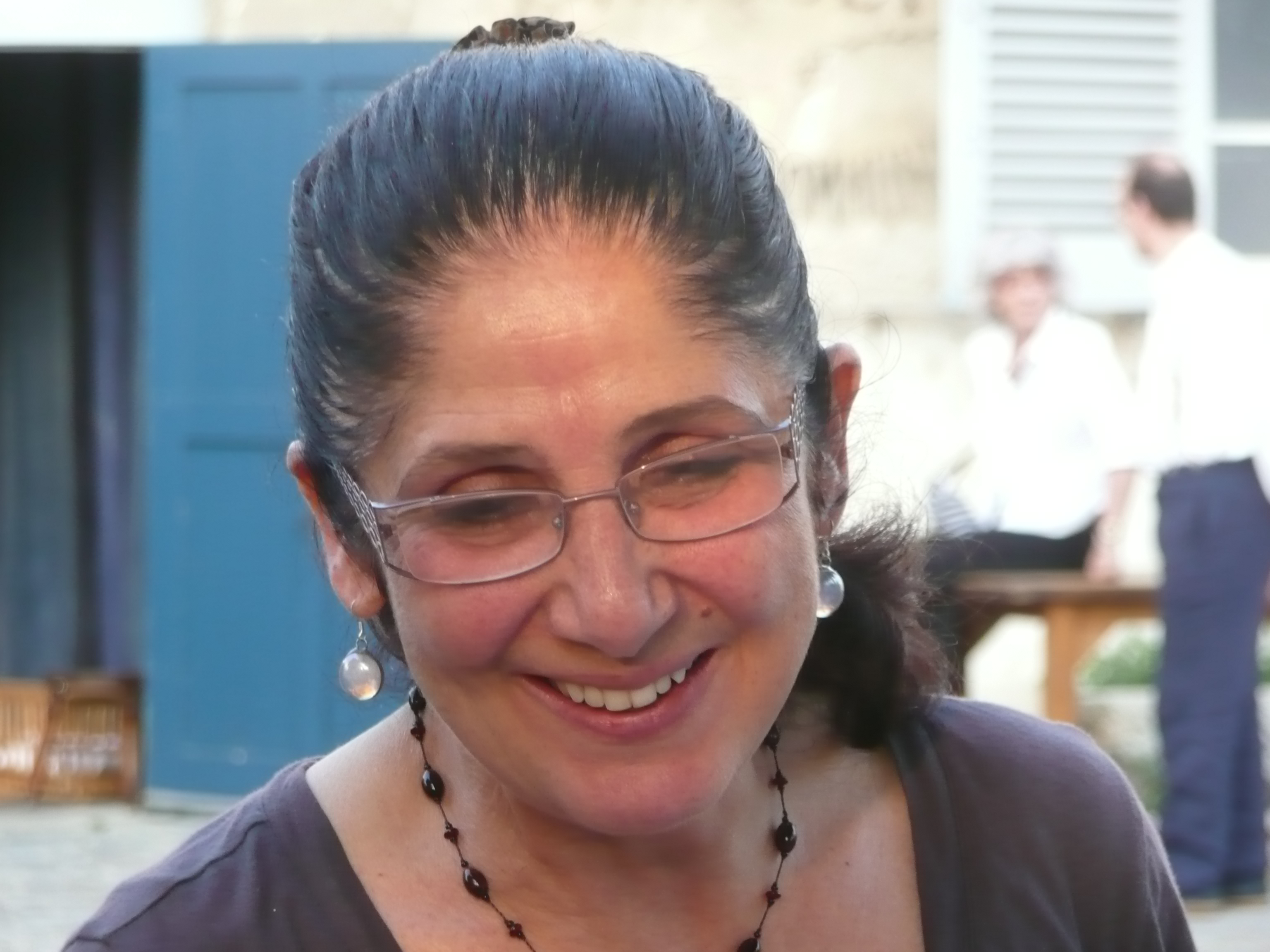
Juliana Carneiro da Cunha
Mother

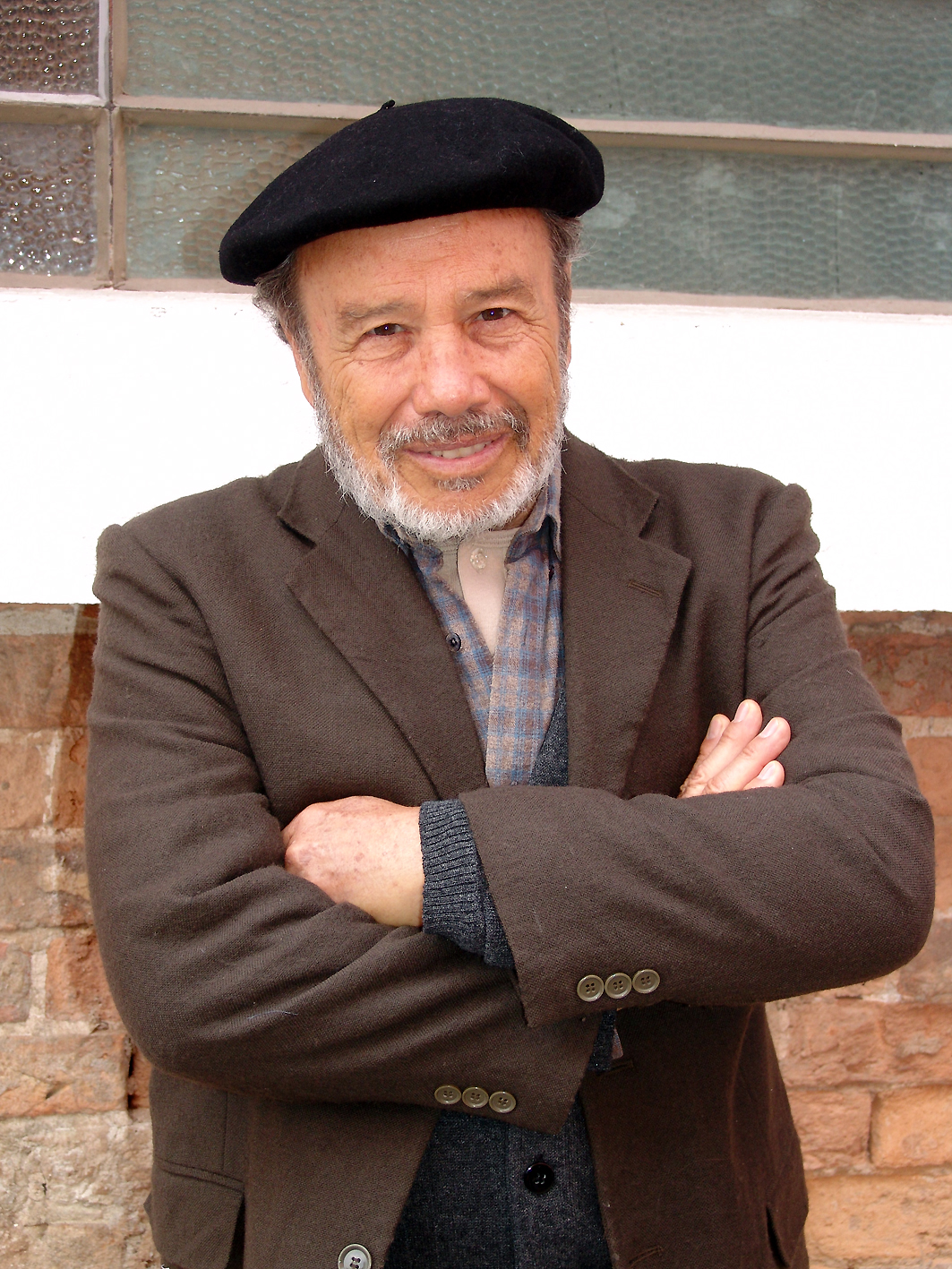
Stênio Garcia
Asmodeu

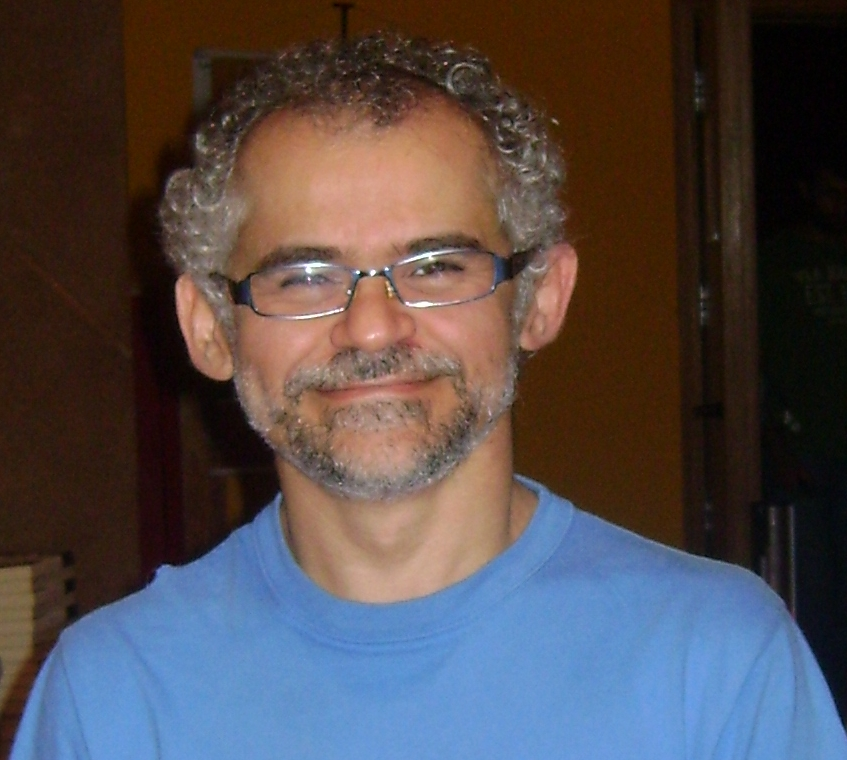
Gero Camilo
Zé Cangaia

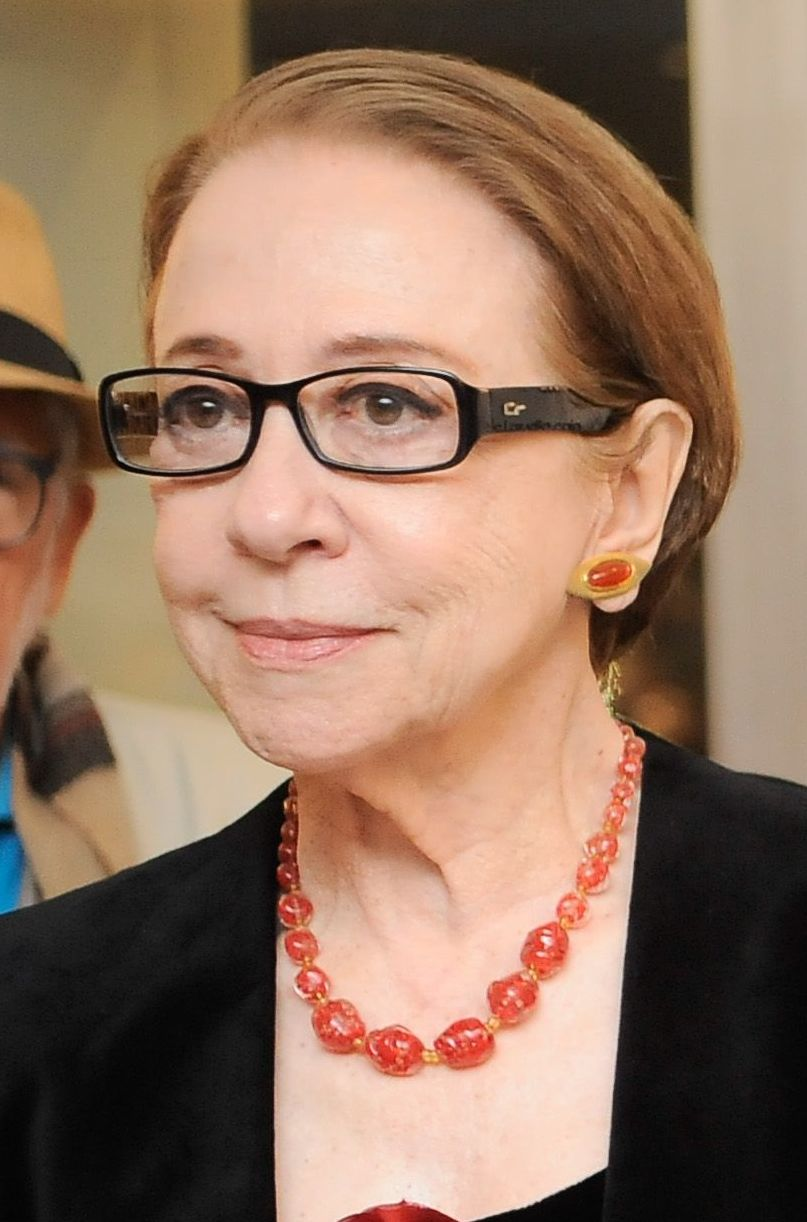
Fernanda Montenegro
Stepmother

== Spin-off ==
A second season with 5 episodes titled Hoje É Dia de Maria: Segunda Jornada, was shown in the same year. A musical version of the novel debuted in São Paulo in September 2016, but it is not approaching the television version that was exhibited in 2005.

== Awards and nominations ==
Year	Award	Category	Result	Reference
2005	Extra Award of Television	Best Child Actress	Carolina Oliveira	Nominated
2005	Emmy Internacional	Best Mini-Series	Luiz Fernando Carvalho	Nominated
2005	Emmy Internacional	Best Performance by an Actress	Carolina Oliveira	Nominated
2005	Brazil Quality Award	Best Director	Luiz Fernando Carvalho	Won
2005	Brazil Quality Award	Best especial project - Rio de Janeiro	Luiz Fernando Carvalho	Won
2005	Brazil Quality Award	Best especial project - São Paulo	Luiz Fernando Carvalho	Won
2005	Brazil Quality Award	Best screenplay - Rio de Janeiro	Luiz Fernando Carvalho; Luis Alberto de Abreu; Carlos Alberto Soffredini	Won
2005	Brazil Quality Award	Best screenplay - São Paulo	Luiz Fernando Carvalho; Luis Alberto de Abreu; Carlos Alberto Soffredini	Won
2005	Brazil Quality Award	Best Breakthrough Actress - Rio de Janeiro	Carolina Oliveira	Won
2005	Brazil Quality Award	Best Supporting Actor - Rio de Janeiro	Osmar Prado	Nominated
2006	ABC Best Photography Award	Best TV Photography	José Tadeu Ribeiro	Won
2006	Contigo! Award	Best Child Actress	Carolina Oliveira	Won
2006	Contigo! Award	Best Director	Luiz Fernando Carvalho	Won
2006	Contigo! Award	Best Actor	Rodrigo Santoro	Nominated
2006	Contigo! Award	Best Actress	Fernanda Montenegro	Nominated
2006	Contigo! Award	Best Breakthrough Actress	Carolina Oliveira	Nominated
2006	Contigo! Award	Best Screenplay	Luiz Fernando Carvalho; Luis Alberto de Abreu; Carlos Alberto Soffredini	Nominated
2006	São Paulo Association of Art Critics	Best Director	Luiz Fernando Carvalho	Won
2006	Banff World Media Festival	Hors Concours	Luiz Fernando Carvalho	Won
2006	Input International Board Taipei	Hors Concours	Luiz Fernando Carvalho	Won
