= Meu Pedacinho de Chão (1971 telenovela) =

- Genre: Romance; Drama
- Created by: Benedito Ruy Barbosa
- Written by: Teixeira Filho
- Directed by: Dionísio Azevedo
- Starring: List: Renée de Vielmond Maurício do Valle Ênio Carvalho Patrícia Aires Castro Gonzaga Cacilda Lanuza Janete Pires Ayres Pinto Pelezinho Renato Consorte Ione Borges Leonor Lambertini Dionísio Azevedo Maria Aparecida Alves Canarinho
- Opening theme: "Meu Pedacinho de Chão" by Cleston Teixeira
- Country of origin: Brazil
- Original language: Portuguese
- No. of episodes: 185

Production
- Running time: 50 minutes

Original release
- Network: TV Globo; TV Cultura
- Release: 16 August 1971 – 6 May 1972

Meu Pedacinho de Chão is a 1971 Brazilian telenovela, produced and broadcast by TV Globo and TV Cultura, originally broadcast between 16 August 1971 and 6 May 1972, running for 185 episodes. It was the first 6 PM telenovela broadcast by TV Globo, being succeeded by Bicho do Mato.

Written by Benedito Ruy Barbosa, with the collaboration of Teixeira Filho, counted with the general and core direction of Dionísio Azevedo. It was rerun by TVE Brasil in 1977.

== Cast ==
Actor	Character
Renée de Vielmond	Juliana Alves
Maurício do Valle	José Aparecido Menezes (Zelão)
Ênio Carvalho	Fernando Napoleão
Castro Gonzaga	Epaminondas Napoleão (Coronel Epa)
Cacilda Lanuza	Maria Helena Napoleão
Janete Pires	Regina Falcão (Gina)
Patrícia Aires	Liliane Napoleão (Pituca)
Ayres Pinto	Pedro das Antas (Serelepe)
Pelezinho	Renato da Silva (Tuim)
Renato Consorte	Giácomo Brunneto
Leonor Lambertini	Joana Menezes (Mãe Benta)
Dionísio Azevedo	Furgêncio Falcão
Maria Aparecida Alves	Tereza Falcão (Dona Tê)
Canarinho	Rodapé Tiradentes da Silva (Roda)
Hemílcio Fróes	Prefeito das Antas
Carlos Castilho	Janjão Escavadeira
Nilson Condé	Renato Batista Júnior
Marilena de Carvalho	Amância
Percy Aires	Padre Santo
Luís Carlos Arutim	Geléia
Sílvia Leblon	Milita
Claudinho Cunha	Piteco
Flora Geni	Romária
Isaac Bardavid	Jorjão
Cleston Teixeira	Sérgio
Xandó Batista	Pedro Galvão
Jorge Cherques	Xanguana
Edmundo José Nogueira	Quintino
Dalmo Ferreira	
Maria Lígia	
Mário Guimarães	
Wladimir Nikolaief	

== Broadcasting ==
For different reasons, both producing networks do not own the original media of the 185 episodes in their archives. While TV Globo owns only the first episode on its collection (while the rest of the episodes were lost on a fire in 1976), TV Cultura owns an unknown number of episodes in its collection in unknown states of preservation (due to economic reasons, as well as poor preservation conditions, the tapes in the latter's collection are not digitized).

Meanwhile, private collectors have a number of preserved and archived episodes. For example, the researcher Gabriel Yudenich which owns at least seven episodes, including the first and the last.

=== Reruns ===
The telenovela began being reran on the afternoon while it was running between 24 August 1971 and 19 May 1972, replacing A Pequena Órfã and being replaced by O Primeiro Amor.

It was reran by TVE in 1977.

== Remake ==
In 2014, TV Globo remade it under the same title on the 6 pm timeslot. The author of the original, Benedito Ruy Barbosa, wrote the remake with Edilene and Marcos Barbosa. The telenovela premiered on 7 April 2014, replacing Joia Rara. The cast featured Bruna Linzmeyer, Irandhir Santos, Johnny Massaro, Juliana Paes, Osmar Prado, Rodrigo Lombardi, Antônio Fagundes, Bruno Fagundes, Inês Peixoto and Emiliano Queiroz, more condensed and with more fictional costumes and settings to convey the literal meaning of the work, not related to reality.
