= Federal University of Pernambuco Recife School of Law =

Law school in Recife, Brazil

Recife School of Law
- Parent school: Federal University of Pernambuco
- School type: Public
- Location: Recife, Brazil

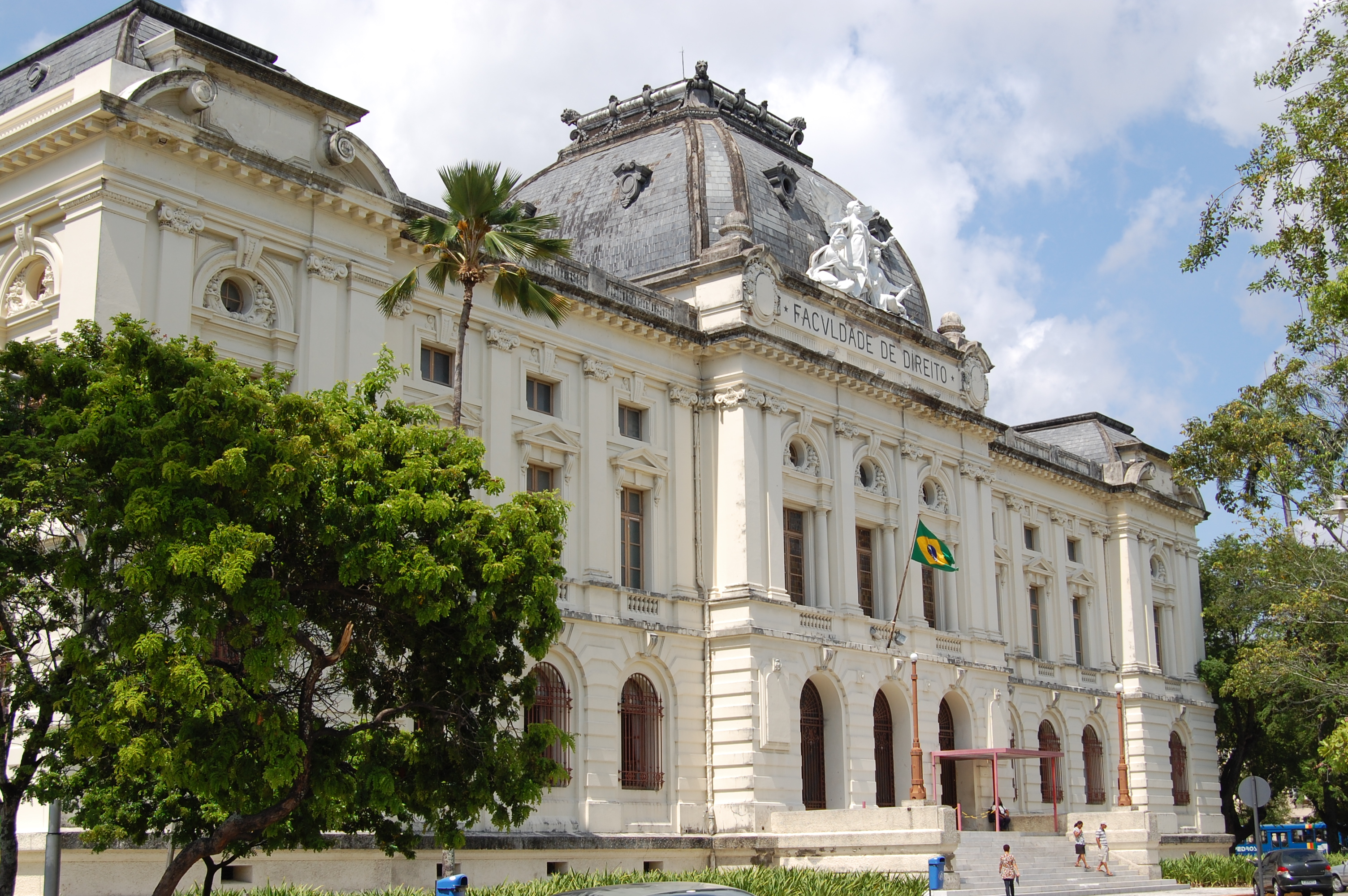
The building of the Law School of the Federal University of Pernambuco.

The Recife School of Law, is the law school of the Federal University of Pernambuco (formerly in Portuguese Faculdade de Direito do Recife and now Faculdade de Direito da Universidade Federal de Pernambuco), it is located in Recife, Pernambuco, Brazil.

== History ==
Established on August 11, 1827, by an imperial law of Dom Pedro I, the school was one of the first higher education institutions in Brazil. Originally located in Olinda, it moved to Recife in 1854. Since 1912 it has been located in its own palace at the square Dr. Adolfo Cirne in downtown Recife.

The school has functioned as a center for philosophy and the humanities since its establishment.

The 'Escola do Recife' intellectual movement, based at the school between 1860 and 1960, was influential in the development of Brazilian positivism. Notable alumni include: Tobias Barreto, Teixeira de Freitas, Assis Chateaubriand, Rio Branco, Nilo Peçanha, Eusébio de Queirós, Epitácio Pessoa, Castro Alves, Sílvio Romero, João Pessoa, Clóvis Beviláqua, Capistrano de Abreu, Graça Aranha, Araripe Júnior, Pontes de Miranda, Barbosa Lima Sobrinho, José Lins do Rego, Paulo Freire, Ariano Suassuna, Zacarias de Góis e Vasconcelos, Rosa e Silva, Sinimbu, Paranaguá, João Alfredo, José Linhares, and Câmara Cascudo.

The postgraduate program has approximately 970 students and has been recognized by the Order of Attorneys of Brazil (OAB). The school's library contains over 100,000 volumes, including rare books.
