= The Passion According to G.H. (film) =

2023 film by Luiz Fernando Carvalho

- Poster
- Portuguese: A Paixão Segundo G.H.
- Directed by: Luiz Fernando Carvalho
- Screenplay by: Melina Dalboni; Luiz Fernando Carvalho
- Based on: A Paixão Segundo G.H. by Clarice Lispector
- Produced by: Luiz Fernando Carvalho; Paulo Roberto Schmidt; Marcio Fraccaroli; Veronica Stumpf; Eleonora Jenkinson; Maria Clara Fernandez; Renata Rezende; Marcelo Ludwig Maia
- Starring: Maria Fernanda Cândido; Samira Nancassa
- Cinematography: Paulo Mancini; Miqueias Lino
- Edited by: Marcio Hashimoto; Nina Galanternick
- Production companies: Paris Entretenimento; Academia de Filmes; LFC Produções; República Pureza; Melograno Films
- Distributed by: Paris Filmes (Brasil); Nitrato Filmes (Portugal)
- Release dates: October 13, 2023 (Festival do Rio); April 11, 2024 (Brazil)
- Country: Brazil
- Language: Portuguese

The Passion According to G.H. (Portuguese: A Paixão Segundo G.H.) is a 2023 Brazilian drama film directed by Luiz Fernando Carvalho, based on the novel of the same name by Clarice Lispector. The film was expected to be released by the end of 2020, in celebration for Lispector's 100th anniversary, before being delayed.

The film premiered at the 2023 São Paulo International Film Festival, with tickets sold out in just 8 minutes. It was also part of the official selection for the 2023 Rio de Janeiro International Film Festival. The film was released in Brazilian theatres on April 11, 2024. In Portugal, it was distributed by Nitrato Filmes at February of the same year.

The film was selected for important international film festivals, such as International Film Festival Rotterdam (2023), Buenos Aires International Festival of Independent Cinema (2024), where it won the Grand Prize and the Best Acting Award for Maria Fernanda Cândido, and FILMADRID (2024), where it won two awards: a special mention from the Jury of Young Filmmakers and Best Performance for the actress Maria Fernanda Cândido.

== Plot ==
Rio de Janeiro, 1964. After suffering the end of a love affair, G.H., a sculptor from Copacabana's artistic elite, decides to clean her apartment by herself, starting with the maid's room. The day before, the maid had quit. In the room, G.H. faces a huge cockroach that reveals her own horror of the world, a reflection of a society full of prejudice against beings it treats as subordinate. Facing the insect, G.H. descends into an existential Via Crucis. This experience leads to the loss of her identity and makes her question all conventions that imprison females to this day.

== Cast ==
- Maria Fernanda Cândido – G.H.
- Samira Nancassa – Janair

== Production ==
The Passion According to G.H. is the second feature film by filmmaker Luiz Fernando Carvalho after the award-winning To the Left of the Father (Portuguese: Lavoura Arcaica) (2001), also a cinematographic version of a classic of Brazilian literature. It was during the editing of "Lavoura Arcaica" that Luiz Fernando Carvalho had contact with G.H. - the central novel of Clarice Lispector's work. Throughout his career, Luiz Fernando Carvalho directed several TV productions based on literature, such as Os Maias, by Eça de Queiroz (2001); Capitu, by Machado de Assis (2005); A Pedra do Reino, by Ariano Suassuna (2007); Dois Irmãos, by Milton Hatoum (2017); and the mini-series Correio Feminino (2013), inspired by chronicles written by Clarice Lispector in the 1950s and 1960s.

The creative process of the film took place in the director's creative shed, in the neighborhood of Vila Leopoldina (SP). In this preparation center, Luiz has proposed various trainings to his team and cast, always in a collaborative way. The entire conception of the movie, the transformation of the literary work for cinema, the work of the team and the filming gave rise to the book "Diary of a Movie" (Rocco (editora), 2024), by screenwriter Melina Dalboni. The publication also brings together the transcripts of the lectures which were given to the team by highly important researchers of Clarice's body of work: José Miguel Wisnik, Nádia Battella Gotlib, Maria Rita Kehl, Yudith Rosembaum, Rafaella Zorzanelli, Flávia Trocoli and Franklin Leopoldo e Silva. The book also combines photos, frames and notebooks from the movie director, Luiz Fernando Carvalho.

=== Casting Preparation ===
Actress Maria Fernanda Cândido was chosen to "be" G.H., the title role of the film. The actress continues her artistic partnership with Luiz Fernando Carvalho: "Capitu" (2008), "Afinal, o que querem as mulheres?" (2010), "Correio Feminino" (2013) and "Dois Irmãos" (2017). Maria Fernanda's preparation work includes improvisation, vocal study and immersion in the original text, always coordinated by Luiz Fernando.

Samira Nancassa, an immigrant from Guinea-Bissau, was specially chosen by Luiz Fernando Carvalho for the role of Janair, G.H.'s maid who resigns.

=== Filming ===
An apartment in Copacabana, Rio de Janeiro (very near the building where Clarice Lispector was actually living), served as a location for the filming of the film, set in the early 1960s. The film was entirely made on 35mm film, developed at the Tecnicolor laboratory in New York. The cinematography was made by Luiz Fernando himself, with the support of Paulo Mancini and Miqueias Lino and the editing by Marcio Hashimoto, the filmmaker's collaborator since "A Pedra do Reino". Some final editing adjustments were done by Nina Galanternick.

=== Release ===
"The movie 'The Passion According to G.H.' is like savoring the achievement of the impossible. It is necessary to discuss whether any artist has ever achieved this. Clarice came close. Carvalho and Candido too"

— Walter Porto, colunista, na Folha de S. Paulo

Initially scheduled for release in 2020, the year of Clarice Lispector's centennial, "Passion" suffered a series of postponements due to the COVID-19 pandemic. In between, Luiz had some different projects to work on, such as the miniseries "Independências" released in 2022, on TV Cultura, in the year of the bicentennial of Brazilian independence.

"Passion" was shown for the first time to the audience at the 25th Rio Film Festival, on October 13, 2023, and at the 47th São Paulo International Film Festival, where the Q&A was held, in the presence of Luiz Fernando Carvalho, Maria Fernanda Candido, Clarice's biographer Nádia Battella Gotlib and Melina Dalboni.

At the international screening at the 53rd edition of the Rotterdam Film Festival, in the Netherlands, the film was widely applauded and had sold-out sessions followed by conversations with the public. On February 15, 2024, the feature film had its national premiere in Portugal, marked by a special and sold-out session at Cinema Trindade, in the city of Porto.

The film had its commercial release in Brazil on April 11, 2024.

=== Critical reception ===
""Clarice Lispector's highly philosophical prose finds a cinematic representation that exceeds all expectations. The film combines the confessional, the experimental and the psychological to achieve an existential horror with echoes of Through a Glass Darkly (film) (1961), by Ingmar Bergman, and Repulsion (film) (1965), by Roman Polanski"

— Cristina Álvarez López, curator from Rotterdam International Film Festival

The work was celebrated by critics after screenings at festivals in Rio, São Paulo, Rotterdam and Buenos Aires. Carlos Alberto de Mattos, a brazilian movie critic, described the film as "extraordinary, courageous and exquisite, not slackening in the face of the challenges of the original. Instead, it dives into its scaly, delirious tissue to extract a pearl of cinema from it."

For movie critic Mónica Delgado, who saw the screening in Rotterdam, "the power of monologues is explored by Carvalho from a predominance of the foreground. And so, the Brazilian director tied with the more than ninety years of "The Passion of Joan of Arc", by Carl Theodor Dreyer. The extraordinary actress Maria Fernanda Cândido, G.H., is a glamorous Maria Falconetti and lives in Rio de Janeiro in the splendid 50s".

In the words of Argentine critic Marta Casale, after the screening at BAFICI, in Buenos Aires, "Carvalho's film is surprisingly sensorial; it plays with textures, sounds and colors; it moves between strong close-ups."

Maria Fernanda Cândido, in the review by the critic Susana Schild, "conducts this particular odyssey with luminous, ethereal power, through the gaze and the pores". Also according to the author Mario Sergio Conti, "it is a film whose beauty has no parallel in recent national cinema. It is better than the novel by author Clarice Lispector on which it is based."

=== Clarice's legacy ===
Sales of Clarice Lispector's book (The Passion According to G.H.) increased 69% in bookstores after the film's premiere in Brazil, according to Rocco (editora), responsible for all the author's work.

In addition to the film, Luiz Fernando Carvalho wrote one of the afterwords was included in the new edition of Clarice's complete work, published by Rocco (editora).
