= Dois Irmãos (miniseries) =

- Genre: Drama; Romance
- Based on: Dois Irmãos by Milton Hatoum
- Developed by: Luiz Fernando Carvalho
- Story by: Maria Camargo
- Starring: Cauã Reymond; Antônio Fagundes; Eliane Giardini; Juliana Paes; Antônio Calloni; Ryan Soares; Irandhir Santos; Maria Fernanda Cândido
- Narrated by: Irandhir Santos
- Country of origin: Brazil
- Original language: Portuguese
- No. of episodes: 10

Production
- Production location: Itacoatiara
- Camera setup: Multi-camera
- Production company: Estúdios Globo

Original release
- Network: Rede Globo
- Release: 9 January – 20 January 2017

Dois Irmãos is a Brazilian miniseries that premiered on 9 January and ended on 20 January 2017. It was developed and directed by Luiz Fernando Carvalho and written by Maria Camargo based on the novel of the same name by Milton Hatoum.

The story runs in three phases featuring identical twin brothers Omar and Yaqub with their family: father Halim, mother Zana and sister Rânia together with an ensemble cast.

The miniseries stars Cauã Reymond who portrays the two brothers, Antonio Fagundes, Eliane Giardini, Juliana Paes, Irandhir Santos, Maria Fernanda Cândido and Vivianne Pasmanter.

== Cast ==
Ator			Character
Phase 1	Phase 2	Phase 3	Character
Enrico Rocha	Matheus Abreu	Cauã Reymond	Omar
Lorenzo Rocha	Matheus Abreu	Cauã Reymond	Yaqub
Gabriella Mustafá	Juliana Paes	Eliane Giardini	Zana
Bruno Anacleto	Antônio Calloni	Antônio Fagundes	Halim
Raphaela Miguel	Letícia Almeida	Bruna Caram	Rânia
Sandra Paramirim	Zahy Guajajara	Silvia Nobre	Domingas
Theo Kasper	Ryan Soares	Irandhir Santos	Nael
Monique Bourscheid	—N/a	Bárbara Evans	Lívia
Emílio Orciollo Netto		Ary Fontoura	Abelardo Reinoso
Maria Fernanda Cândido		Carmem Verônica	Estelita Reinoso
—N/a		Michel Melamed	Antenor Laval
Mariana Nolasco	Yasmin Garcez	Victória Blat	Nahda
Sura Zachia	Giulia Nadruz	Mabel Cezar	Zahia
Munir Kanaan		Isaac Bardavid	Abbas
—N/a		Camila Silva	Pau Mulato
Sammer Othman		Jitman Vibranovski	Cid Tannus
—N/a		Gregorz Mielec	Bolislau
Zeferino Kuaray		Júlio Adrião	Adamor Perna de Sapo
Mounir Maasri	—N/a		Galib
Sami Bordokan		Sami Bordokan	Talib
Vivianne Pasmanter			Irmã Damasceno
