= Luiz Fernando Carvalho bibliography =

This is a bibliography of books by or about the Brazilian director Luiz Fernando Carvalho.

== Books about Luiz Fernando Carvalho works ==
- Carter, Eli Lee "Luiz Fernando Carvalho: An Auteur of Brazilian Television", UCLA Electronic Theses and Dissertations, 2013
- Hamburguer, Esther (2010). "Brazilian Film and Television in Times of Intermedia Diversification". A Companion to Latin American Cinema. Zahar. pp. 375–390. ISBN 9781118552889.
- Debs, Sylvie (2008). "Do gosto do público, segundo Luiz Fernando Carvalho" (PDF). Cinémas d'Amérique latine, nº 16. ARCALT - PUM Presses universitaires du Mirail (Toulouse). ISBN 978-2-85816-989-4.
- Eduardo, Cléber (2005). "Eu é um outro – Variações da narração em primeira pessoa". Cinema Brasileiro 1995-2005 – Ensaios sobre uma década. Contracampo. p. 137. ISBN 9788588338685.
- Diegues, Carlos; Merten, Luiz Carlos; Fonseca, Rodrigo (2007). Cinco mais cinco – Os maiores filmes brasileiros em bilheteria e crítica. Legere. pp. 212–213. ISBN 9788586402418.
- Valente, Eduardo (2011). "O que pulsa além dos longas?" (PDF). Cinema Brasileiro – Anos 2000, 10 questões. CCBB/Revista Cinética. pp. 68–71.
- Avellar, José Carlos (2007). O chão da palavra – Cinema e literatura no Brasil. Rocco. ISBN 9788532521804.
- Victor, Adriana; Lins, Juliana (2007). Ariano Suassuna – Um perfil biográfico. Zahar. p. 100. ISBN 9788571109896.
- Bernardo, Gustavo (2010). O livro da metaficção. Tinta Negra. pp. 122–123. ISBN 9788563114006.
- Catálogo de la 55 semana internacional de cine de Valladolid. Semana Internacional de Cine de Valladolid. 2010. ISBN 978-8487737251.
- Catálogo da 15ª Mostra de Cinema de Tiradentes. Universo Produções. 2012.

=== Studies of To the Left of the Father (Lavoura Arcaica) ===
- Carvalho, Luiz Fernando (2002). Sobre Lavour'Arcaica – O filme. Ateliê Editorial. ISBN 9780815411833.
- Tardivo, Renato Cury (2009). Porvir que vem antes de tudo: uma leitura de lavoura arcaica - literatura, cinema e a unidade dos sentidos (Thesis). São Paulo: Universidade de São Paulo (USP). doi:10.11606/D.47.2009.tde-11122009-110032.
- Carvalho, Walter (2003). Fotografias de um filme. Cosac Naify. ISBN 9788575031889.

=== Studies of Today is Maria's Day (Hoje é Dia de Maria) ===
- Carvalho, Luiz Fernando; Abreu, Luis Alberto (2006). Hoje é dia de Maria – Roteiros da 1a e 2a jornadas. Globo. ISBN 9788525040985.
- Guzzi, C. P. (2005). "A recriação dos contos populares e a constituição da narradora arquetípica na minissérie Hoje é dia de Maria". Revista Literatura Em Debate. 8 (14): 146–159.
- Guzzi, C. P. (2012). "Riscando o molde: a função poética como modelo estruturante na transposição da minissérie Hoje é dia de Maria". Cadernos de Letras da UFF: 403. Archived from the original on 2017-08-05.

=== Studies of Capitu ===
- Carvalho, Luiz Fernando (2008). O processo de Capitu. LeYa Casa da Palavra. ISBN 978-8577341023.
- Carvalho, Luiz Fernando (2008). "Capitu c'est moi?". Livro - Quem é Capitu?. Nova Fronteira. pp. 17–20. ISBN 9788520920831.
- Carvalho, Luiz Fernando; Diniz, Julio (2008). "Capitu c'est moi?". Machado de Assis (1908-2008). Contraponto. pp. 80–83. ISBN 978-85-7866-011-6.
- Carter, Eli Lee "Rereading Dom Casmurro - aesthetic hybridity in Capitu", University of Virginia, 2014.
- Guzzi, C. P. (2012). "Por uma ficção autoconsciente: a transposição do romance Dom Casmurro para a minissérie Capitu" (PDF). Machado de Assis Em Linha: 82–101.
- Guzzi, C. P. (2012). "A narrativa impressionista do escritor Machado de Assis e a atitude expressionista do diretor Luiz Fernando Carvalho". CASA (Araraquara). 10 (2): 1–12. doi:10.21709/casa.v10i2.5593.
- Bulhões, Marcelo Magalhães (2012). "Para Além da "Fidelidade" na Adaptação Audiovisual: o Caso da Minissérie Televisiva Capitu". Galáxia. Revista do Programa de Pós-Graduação Em Comunicação e Semiótica (23).
- Nepomuceno, Mariana Maciel (2015). "O elogio da ilusão: Capitu de Luiz Fernando Carvalho". Pernambuco: UFPE.
- Torrens Leite, Rafaela Bernardazzi (2016). "Poética visual e a relação com elementos fílmicos da minissérie Capitu". Revista Estética. Archived from the original on 2017-09-29.
- Czizewski, Claiton César; Silva, Anderson Lopes (2014). "Capitu: A cultura híbrida e a liquidez pós-moderna em um olhar". Revista Latino Americana de Estudios en Cultura. Archived from the original on 2017-09-29.
- Pucci, Renato Luiz (2015). "Grande Sertão: Veredas e Capitu – Rupturas de paradigmas na ficção televisiva brasileira" (PDF). Socine.
- Izawa, Irene (2012). "Capitu: uma leitura pós-moderna de Dom Casmurro – Rupturas de paradigmas na ficção televisiva brasileira" (PDF). Curitiba: Uniandrade. Archived from the original (PDF) on 2017-09-29.
- Becker, Caroline Valada (2010). "Dom Casmurro e Capitu : poéticas da palavra e da imagem". Porto Alegre: UFRGS.
- Santos, Juliana Rodrigues dos (2010). "A literatura na tela da televisão: Capitu, uma tradução de Dom Casmurro". Campo Grande: UFMS.
- Torrens Leite, Rafaela Bernardazzi (2015). A cor e o figurino na construção de personagens na narrativa televisual: um estudo de caso da minissérie Capitu (Thesis). São Paulo: USP. doi:10.11606/D.27.2015.tde-24112015-164357.
- Monteiro, Alexandre de Assis (2013). "Capitu: olhares para uma narração oblíqua". João Pessoa: UFPB.
- Pires, Yasmin (2013). "Um Expressionismo em Capitu: a apropriação imagética contemporânea". Manaus: Universidade da Amazônia.
- Monteiro, Alexandre de Assis; Mousinho, Luiz Antonio (2016). "A captura de Dom Casmurro por uma crítica disposta entre o romance e a microssérie". Bakhtiniana: Revista de Estudos do Discurso. 11 (3): 103–119. doi:10.1590/2176-457322360.
- Millecco, Mariana (2017). "No princípio era o texto: Dom Casmurro no papel, Capitu na tela". Machado de Assis Em Linha. 10 (20): 110–133. doi:10.1590/1983-6821201710207.
- Collaço, Fernando Martins (2013). "Luiz Fernando Carvalho e o processo criativo na televisão : a minissérie Capitu e o estilo do diretor". Universidade Estadual de Campinas.
- Pinati, Flávia Giúlia Andriolo (2013). "Capitu: uma transposição metaficcional". Aleph: 159 f. : il.
- Silva, Ana Claudia Suriani; Millecco, Mariana (2017). "Entrevista com Beth Filipecki, figurinista de Capitu (2008)". Machado de Assis Em Linha. 10 (20): 147–153. doi:10.1590/1983-6821201710209.
- Oliveira, Lara Luiza Spagnol (2013). "Aí vindes outra vez, inquietas sombras: tempo e memória na tradução de Dom Casmurro para Capitu" (PDF). Belo Horizonte: UFMG. Archived from the original (PDF) on 2017-09-29.
- Bezerra, Júlia Rochetti (2016). "Da adaptação de Dom Casmurro : do romance aos quadrinhos e à televisão". Campinas: Unicamp.
- Rosa, Luiza Maria Almeida (2012). "A adaptação barroca de Dom Casmurro para Capitu: do livro ao corpo na TV". São Paulo: PUC-SP.
- Nonato, Lívia Martins (2013). "Teatralidade na obra audiovisual Capitu". Londrina: Universidade de Londrina.
- Heck, Ana Paula (2014). "Uma ideia e um escrúpulo:a a apropriação de Capitu como experiência educomunicativa" (PDF). Curitiba: UFPR.

=== Studies of other TV series ===
- Carter, Eli Lee "Afinal, o que Querem as Mulheres?: Luiz Fernando Carvalho's Metafictional Critique of Brazilian Television Fiction", University of Virginia, 2014
- Wajnman, Solange (2011). "Minisséries históricas e a comunicação por objetos. Notas sobre os figurinos e cenários de 'Primo Basílio' e "Os Maias"". Santa Maria: Universidade de Santa Maria (UFSM).
- Guzzi, C. P. (2007). "A leitura figurativa do Movimento Armorial a partir da significação da vinheta de abertura de A Pedra do Reino". Rebeca - Revista Brasileira de Estudos de Cinema e Audiovisual. 4: 257–274. doi:10.22475/rebeca.v4n1.178.
- Pagliaro, Leandro (2017). Fotografias – O processo criativo dos atores de Dois irmãos. Bazar do Tempo. ISBN 9788569924203.

== Books by Luiz Fernando Carvalho ==
- Carvalho, Luiz Fernando (2002). Sobre Lavour'Arcaica – O filme. Ateliê Editorial. ISBN 9780815411833.
- Carvalho, Luiz Fernando; Abreu, Luis Alberto (2006). Hoje é dia de Maria – Roteiros da 1a e 2a jornadas. Globo. ISBN 9788525040985.
- Carvalho, Luiz Fernando (2007). Pedra do Reino - Estojo Ilustrado com 5 Cadernos de Filmagens + Diário de Elenco e Equipe. Globo. ISBN 978-8525043375.
- Carvalho, Luiz Fernando (2008). O processo de Capitu. LeYa Casa da Palavra. ISBN 978-8577341023.
- Carvalho, Luiz Fernando (2008). "Capitu c'est moi?". Livro - Quem é Capitu?. Nova Fronteira. pp. 17–20. ISBN 9788520920831.
- Carvalho, Luiz Fernando; Diniz, Julio (2008). "Capitu c'est moi?". Machado de Assis (1908-2008). Contraponto. pp. 80–83. ISBN 978-85-7866-011-6.
- Carvalho, Luiz Fernando; Cuenca, João Paulo; Gianetti, Cecília; Melamed, Michel (2010). Afinal, o que querem as mulheres?. LeYa. ISBN 9788580440300.
- Carvalho, Luiz Fernando; Lins, Paulo; Franz, Pedro (2012). Suburbia. Aeroplano. ISBN 9788578200916. Archived from the original on 2017-11-12.
- Carvalho, Luiz Fernando (2013). Meu Pedacinho de Chão. LeYa Casa da Palavra. ISBN 978-85-7734-525-0.
