= Don't Swallow My Heart, Alligator Girl! =

2017 film

- Directed by: Felipe Bragança
- Written by: Felipe Bragança
- Starring: Cauã Reymond
- Release date: 22 January 2017 (Sundance)
- Running time: 106 minutes
- Country: Brazil
- Languages: Portuguese; Guarani

Don't Swallow My Heart, Alligator Girl! (Portuguese: Não Devore Meu Coração) is a 2017 Brazilian drama film directed by Felipe Bragança. It was screened in the World Cinema Dramatic Competition section of the 2017 Sundance Film Festival.

== Cast ==
- Cauã Reymond as Fernando
- Mario Verón as Alberto
- Leopoldo Pacheco as César
- Adeli Benitez as Basano
