= Milton Hatoum =

Brazilian writer, translator and professor

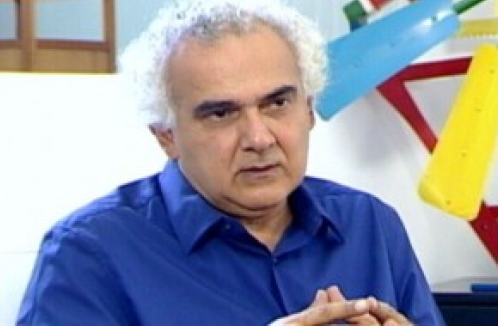
- Born: August 19, 1952 (age 73); Manaus, Brazil
- Occupation: Writer
- Notable work: Two Brothers, Orphans of Eldorado and Tale of a Certain Orient.

Milton Assi Hatoum (Brazilian Portuguese: [ˈmiwtõ aˈsi aˈtũ]; born August 19, 1952) is a Brazilian writer, translator and professor. Hatoum is one of Brazil's most eminent contemporary writers. Among other honors, Hatoum was awarded Brazil's most prestigious literary award, the Jabuti Prize, three times for best novel. In 2017, he received the title of Officier de L'Ordre des Arts et des Lettres from the French government.

Born in Manaus of Lebanese descent, he studied comparative literature in Paris, and has served as professor of literature at universities such as the Federal University of Amazonas (UFAM) and at the University of California, Berkeley.

His first novel, Relato de um Certo Oriente ("Tale of a Certain Orient"), won the Jabuti Prize in 1989. His second novel, Dois Irmãos ("Two Brothers"), won another Jabuti in 2000 and was translated into twelve languages and adapted for television, theater and comics. His third novel Cinzas do Norte ("Ashes of the Amazon") won the Jabuti in 2005, as well as the Portugal Telecom Prize for Literature, Bravo! and APCA awards. In 2008, his novel Órfãos do Eldorado, was adapted for the cinema.

Over 200,000 copies of his books have been sold in Brazil, and they have been translated in several languages including Italian, English, French, Spanish, Danish, Czech, and Arabic.

Hatoum writes about destructured families in his works, with a political tendency. In two of his books, Dois Irmãos and Cinzas do Norte, Milton Hatoum made a subtle criticism of the Brazilian military regime of 1964–1985.

== Early years ==
Hatoum's father was an immigrant from Lebanon who met a Brazilian of Lebanese origin. During his childhood, Milton lived with the culture, religion and language of Arabs and African Jews. At age 15 he moved to Brasília and finished secondary school in the Brazilian capital.

After that, Hatoum moved to São Paulo. Three years later, he studied Architecture and Urbanism at the University of São Paulo (USP). In 1980 he traveled to Spain on a scholarship from Instituto Iberoamericano de Cooperación. He lived in Madrid and Barcelona. After that, he took postgraduate courses at the University of Paris III.

=== Career ===
After concluding his studies, Hatoum returned to Manaus, where he taught French language and literature at the Universidade Federal do Amazonas. Relato de um Certo Oriente was published when he was 37.

He became a Doctor in Literary Theory at USP in 1998. Feeling unsatisfied with the politics in Manaus, he decided to live in São Paulo. Eleven years after publishing his first novel, Milton wrote Dois Irmãos. Between the publishing of the first and second books, he published several short stories in newspapers and magazines in Brazil and abroad.

On 14 August 2025, he was elected to occupy the Chair number 6 at the Brazilian Academy of Letters, in succession to Cícero Sandroni.

== Recognition ==
- 1990 Jabuti Prize - Shortlisted in the Best Book of the Year category for Relato de um Certo Oriente
- 2001 Jabuti Prize - Shortlisted in the Best Romance of the Year category for Dois Irmãos
- 2009 São Paulo Prize for Literature — Shortlisted in the Best Book of the Year category for Órfãos do Eldorado

== Novels ==
- Relato de um Certo Oriente ("Tale of a Certain Orient"). São Paulo: Cia. das Letras, 1989.
- Dois Irmãos ("Two Brothers"). São Paulo: Cia. das Letras, 2000.
- Cinzas do Norte ("Ashes of the Amazon"). Cia. das Letras, 2005.
- Orfãos do Eldorado ("Orphans of Eldorado"). São Paulo: Cia. das Letras, 2008.

=== O Lugar Mais Sombrio (The Shadiest Place) trilogy ===
- A Noite da Espera ("The Night of Waiting"). São Paulo, Cia das Letras, 2017.
- Ponto de Fuga. São Paulo: Cia. das Letras, 2019.
- Dança de Enganos. São Paulo: Cia. das Letras, 2025.

=== Adaptations ===
- Fábio Moon and Gabriel Bá: Two Brothers, Milwaukie: Dark Horse Comics, 2015; a comic based on Dois Irmãos.
- In 2017, the miniseries Dois Irmãos debuted on TV Globo, directed by Luiz Fernando Carvalho. Cauã Reymond stars in the role of twin brothers.

== Short stories ==
- A cidade ilhada
- Você tem medo do quê?
- Varandas da Eva
