= Isaac Bardavid =

Brazilian actor (1931–2022)

- Born: 13 February 1931; Niterói, Rio de Janeiro, Brazil
- Died: 1 February 2022 (aged 90); Niterói, Rio de Janeiro, Brazil
- Occupations: Actor, voice actor and poet
- Years active: 1948–2022

Isaac Bardavid (13 February 1931 – 1 February 2022) was a Brazilian actor of Jewish-Turkish origin.

Bardavid was considered one of the great names in Brazilian dubbing, having voiced characters such as Doctor Eggman, Wolverine, Freddy Krueger, Tigger, and Skeletor - Bardavid's voicing of Wolverine awarded him a commend from actor Hugh Jackman himself. As an actor, he became known for playing the overseer Francisco in Escrava Isaura. Born in Brazil, he died on 1 February 2022, at the age of 90.

== Filmography ==
Year	Title	Role	Notes
2021	Carcereiros	Álvaro	
2017	Dois Irmãos	Abbas	
2013	Além do Horizonte	Klaus	
2012	Salve Jorge	Tartan	
2012	Rei Davi	Samuel	
2010	S.O.S. Emergência		
2008	Faça Sua História	Garrastazu and José Carlos Barreira	
2008	Casos e Acasos	Otacílio and Pedro Paulo	
2007	Eterna Magia	Zequinha	
2006	Sítio do Picapau Amarelo	Elias Turco	
2005	Mandrake	Raimundo	
2004	Chocolate com Pimenta	Lawyer	
2001	A Padroeira	Filipe Pedroso	
2001	Sítio do Picapau Amarelo	Miguelito Ramirez de Souza Rodrigues	
2000	O Cravo e a Rosa	Felisberto	
1994	A Viagem	Lawyer	
1993	Você Decide		
1980	Malu Mulher	Xavier	
1979	Sítio do Picapau Amarelo	Antônio Carreiro	
1978	Sítio do Picapau Amarelo	Cássio	
1977	O Astro	Youssef Hayala	
1977	Locomotivas	Vítor	
1976	Escrava Isaura	Francisco	
1974	Fogo sobre Terra	Salim	
1972	Selva de Pedra	State prosecutor	
1970	Irmãos Coragem	Dr. Humberto	
