= Irandhir Santos =

Brazilian actor (born 1978)

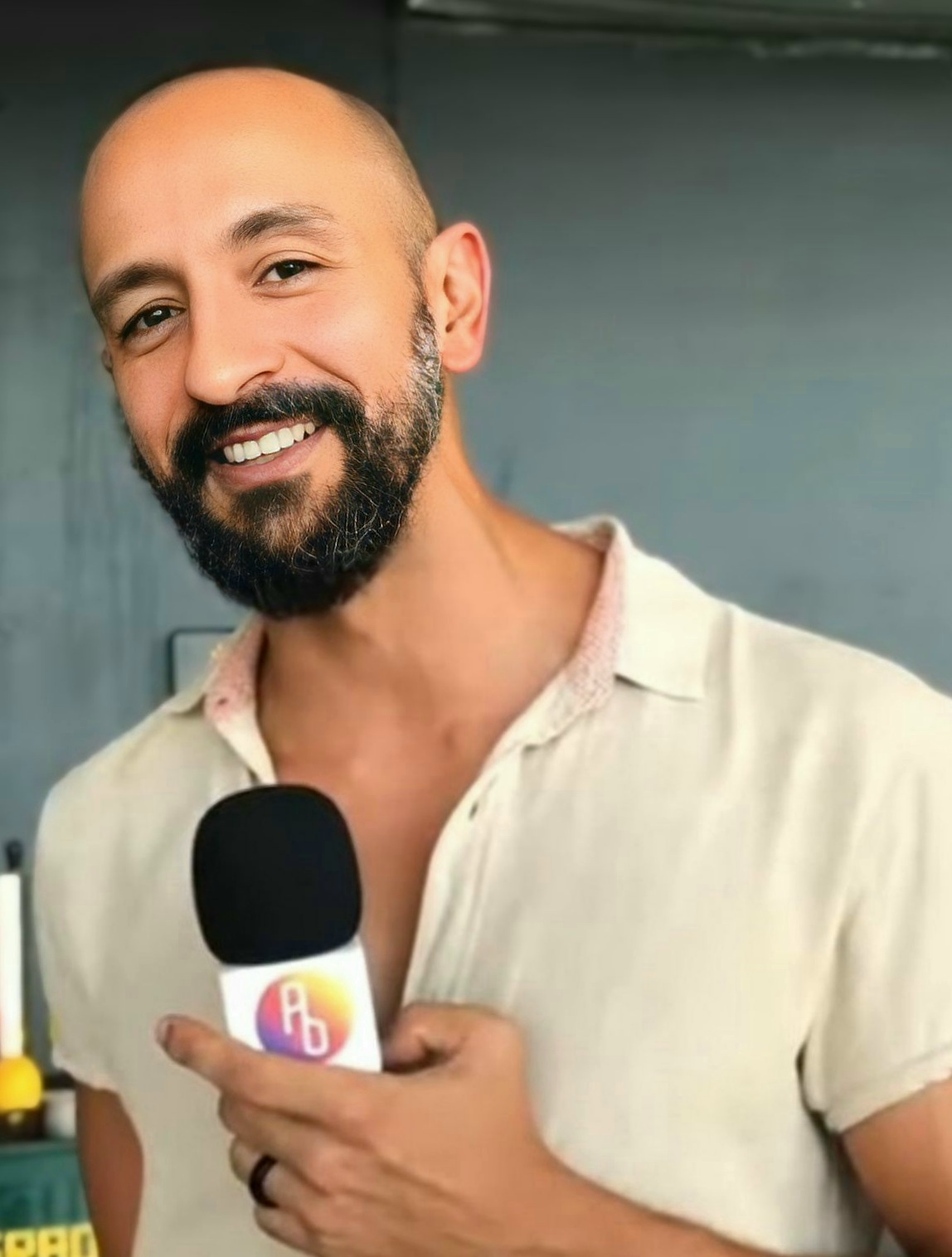
- Santos in 2019
- Born: 22 August 1978 (age 48); Barreiros, Pernambuco, Brazil
- Education: Federal University of Pernambuco
- Occupation: Actor
- Years active: 1996–present
- Spouse: Roberto Efrem Filho (m. 2014)

Irandhir Santos Pinto (born 22 August 1978) is a Brazilian actor.

== Early life ==
Born in Barreiros, Pernambuco, Irandhir lived in several cities in the countryside of Pernambuco during his childhood. In 2003, he graduated from a performing arts degree course at the Federal University of Pernambuco. Since then, he has acted in some plays, a television mini-series and several movies.

== Filmography ==
=== Film ===
Year	Title	Role
2005	Cinema, Aspirins and Vultures	Manoel
2006	Baixio das Bestas	Maninho
2009	Blue Eyes	Nonato
2009	I Travel Because I Have to, I Come Back Because I Love You	Zé Renato
2009	The Assailant	Noca de Antônia
2010	Elite Squad: The Enemy Within	Diogo Fraga
2011	A Febre do Rato	Zizo
2012	Neighboring Sounds	Clodoaldo
2013	Tatuagem	Clécio
2014	Absence	Ney
2016	Aquarius	Roberval
2024	Carnival is Over	

=== Television ===
Year	Title	Role
2025	Guerreiros do Sol	Arduino Alencar
2025	Vale Tudo	William José Cardoso / William McPherson
2024	Renascer	Sebastião de Pádua "Tião Galinha"
2022	Pantanal	José Lucas de Nada
2019	Amor de Mãe	Álvaro da Nóbrega
2018	Onde Nascem os Fortes	Samir
2017	Dois Irmãos	Nael
2016	Velho Chico	Bento dos Anjos
2014	Meu Pedacinho de Chão	José Aparecido Menezes (Zelão)
2014	Amores Roubados	João da Silva
2007	A Pedra do Reino	Dom Pedro Diniz Quaderna
