= Sílvio Romero =

Brazilian writer

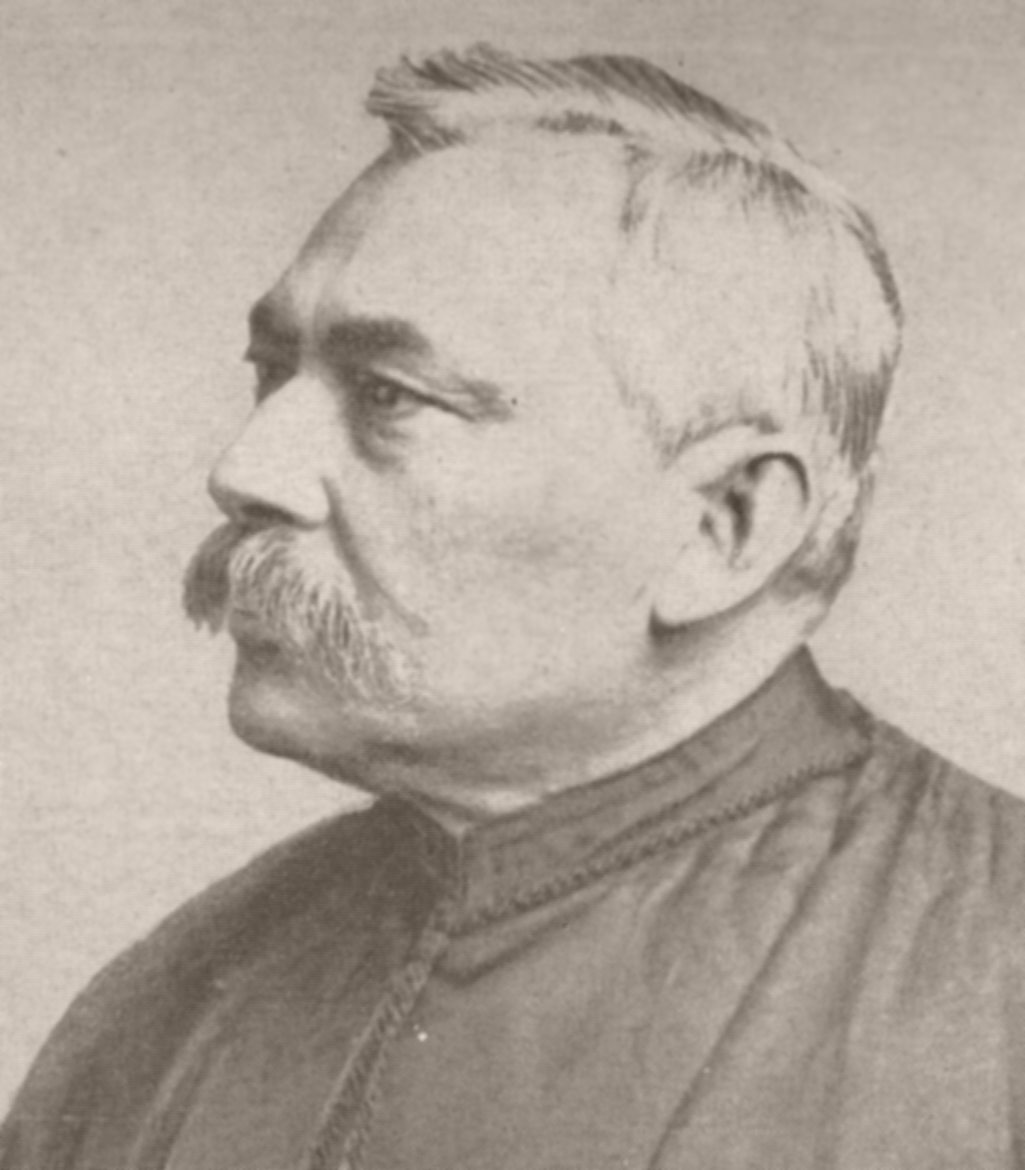
- Born: Sílvio Vasconcelos da Silveira Ramos Romero; 21 April 1851; Lagarto, Sergipe, Empire of Brazil
- Died: 18 June 1914 (aged 63); Rio de Janeiro City, Rio de Janeiro, Brazil
- Education: Faculdade de Direito do Recife
- Occupations: Poet; essayist; literary critic; professor; journalist
- Writing career
- Movement: Romanticism

Sílvio Vasconcelos da Silveira Ramos Romero (April 21, 1851 – June 18, 1914) was a Brazilian "Condorist" poet, essayist, literary critic, professor, journalist, historian and politician.

He founded and occupied the 17th chair of the Brazilian Academy of Letters from 1897 until his death in 1914.

== Life ==
Romero was born in the city of Lagarto, in the State of Sergipe, in 1851, to André Ramos Romero, a Portuguese salesman, and Maria Joaquina Vasconcelos da Silveira. He graduated in Law at the Faculdade de Direito do Recife in 1873, and would work for many newspapers of Pernambuco and Rio during the 1870s.

In 1875, he was elected a provincial deputy for the city of Estância. His first poetry book, Cantos do Fim do Século, was published in 1878. In 1879 he moved to Rio de Janeiro and served as Philosophy teacher for the Colégio Pedro II between 1881 and 1910.

He died in 1914.

== Works ==
- Cantos do Fim do Século (1878)
- Cantos Populares do Brasil (1883)
- Últimos Harpejos (1883)
- Contos Populares do Brasil (1885)
- Uma Esperteza (1887)
- Parnaso Sergipano (1889)
- Folclore Brasileiro (1897)

Preceded by Hipólito da Costa (patron)	Brazilian Academy of Letters - Occupant of the 17th chair 1897 — 1914	Succeeded by Osório Duque-Estrada
