= Maria Fernanda Cândido =

Brazilian actress and television presenter

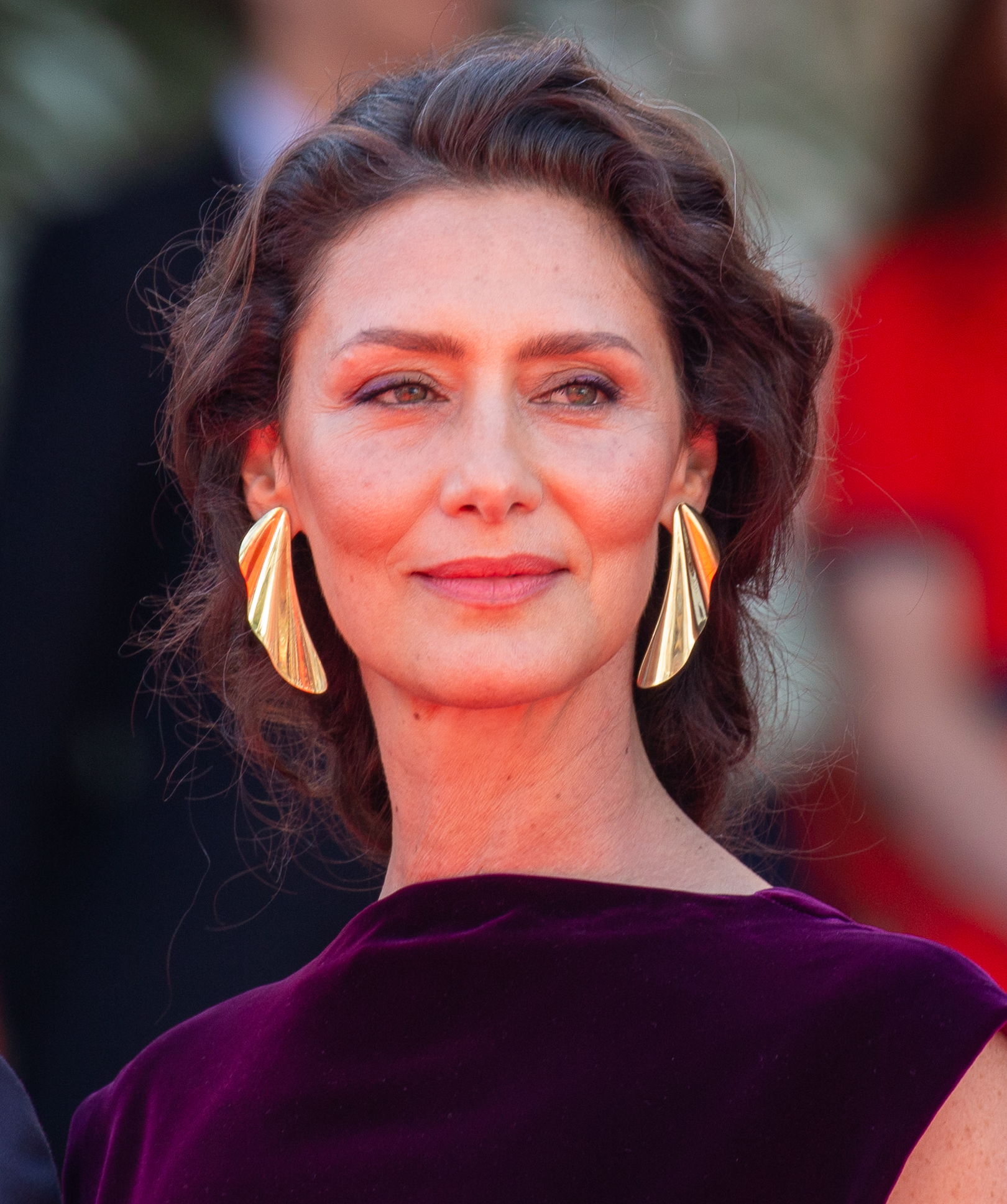
- Cândido at the 2025 Cannes Film Festival
- Born: 21 May 1974 (age 52); Londrina, Paraná, Brazil
- Education: St. Louis College
- Alma mater: University of São Paulo
- Occupations: Actress; television presenter
- Height: 1.77 m (5 ft 10 in)
- Spouse: Petrit Spahira (m. 2005)
- Children: 2

Maria Fernanda Cândido (born 21 May 1974) is a Brazilian actress, television presenter, and former model.

== Biography ==
Maria Fernanda Cândido lived in Curitiba from the age of four to twelve, when she moved to São Paulo with her family. Her parents, José Reginaldo and Agda, were merchants.

Once in São Paulo, she was enrolled in the prestigious Colégio São Luiz, where she proved to be a good student. At 14, she began her career as a professional model after being discovered by one of her neighbours, who was a fashion producer. She modeled for fashion publications, magazine covers, and campaigns for famous brands. At age 15, during school summer breaks, she travelled to Paris to work. In total, she spent five years juggling school, fashion shows, and photo shoots.

After finishing high school, she lived in New York City for six months and, before returning to Brazil, went to the French capital for another season of runway shows. She always made a good impression on her co-workers due to her punctuality and discipline regarding schedules. More than a year living abroad was enough for her to decide to put an end to her international modeling career.

Back in Brazil, she applied for, and was accepted at USP, where she studied occupational therapy, studying in the full-time programme for three years before dropping out to join MTV, working as a VJ hosting the show Ilha do Biquini (Bikini Island). After shooting the pilot, unhappy with the outcome, she sought technical improvement in a studio in São Paulo. As a result of that experience, she discovered her talent for on-camera work. She formally withdrew from college to study vocal technique with Fátima Toledo, a famous speech therapist, in order to focus on acting for the cinema.

Real success came in 1999. After sending a videobook to TV director Jayme Monjardim, of Rede Globo, she was invited to audition and soon joined the cast of Terra Nostra soap-opera in the role of an Italian young woman, Paola. For that job, she hired a dialect coach in order to improve her Italian pronunciation. The role led to her winning the prestigious Troféu Imprensa and in 2000 she was voted the most beautiful woman of the century in a poll conducted by Fantástico a Sunday evening TV show. At the time, she was compared to the young Sophia Loren, the Italian legend, paralleling the latter's beauty and talent. Like her character in the soap opera, Cândido's great-grandmother, arrived in Brazil around 1880. The actress is a descendant of the Bortolacci and Malvezi families on her mother's side and the Guiraldellis on her father's side, both coming from Venice, northern Italy. "The funny thing is that I go by the Cândido family name, highlighting the only part of my heritage that is actually Brazilian," she stresses. Another coincidence between her own family's history and the soap opera is that her family settled in the same area where the plot was set, the Oeste Paulista, the western region of the State of São Paulo. The character is also the daughter of Italian Anacleto, who works on a coffee farm, the same occupation as her great-grandparents when they arrived in Brazil. As part of her research to play Paola, she watched films such as Bicycle Thieves, Marriage Italian Style and The Gold of Naples, and to better understand the context in which her character would have lived, she also watched 1900, Bernardo Bertolucci.

In 2003, she debuted as a cinema actress in the movie Dom and won the Kikito Award for Best Actress at the Festival de Gramado.

In 2008, she was chosen to be the face of Orient Watches' new marketing campaign during the first half of the year. Cândido was the star in two campaigns for the launching of the company's then new collection, which were broadcast over the months of April, May and June. The female models of Orient were chosen to reflect major global trends.

== Filmography ==
=== Film ===
Year	Title	Role	Notes
2003	Dom	Ana	
2005	Sal de Prata	Cátia	
2010	Aparecida - O Milagre	Beatriz	
2010	A Fronteira de Sangue		
2015	My Hindu Friend		
2019	The Traitor	Maria Cristina de Almeida Guimarães	
2022	Fantastic Beasts: The Secrets of Dumbledore	Vicência Santos	
2023	The Passion According to G.H.	G.H.	
2025	The Secret Agent	Elza	

=== Television ===
Year	Title	Role	Notes
1996	A Ilha do Biquíni	Herself	TV Show. VJ
1997	Al Dente	Herself	TV Show. VJ
1997	A Indomada	Woman	Telenovela. Opening Sequence
1998	Pérola Negra	Manoela	Telenovela. Cameo
1998	Serras Azuis	Magali	
1999	Terra Nostra	Paola	Telenovela. Main Cast
2000	Mundo VIP	Herself	Cameo
2000	Aquarela do Brasil	Isa Galvão	
2002	Esperança	Nina	Telenovela. Main Cast
2003	Os Normais	Fabiana	Series. Guest. Episode: Casal Que Vive Brigando Não Tem Crise
2004	Um Só Coração	Ana Schmidt	Limited Series. Main Cast
2004	Como uma Onda	Lavínia	Telenovela. Main Cast
2007	Paraíso Tropical	Fabiana Sampaio	Telenovela. Main Cast
2008	Capitu	Capitu	Limited Series. Main Role
2010	Dalva e Herivelto: uma Canção de Amor	Lurdes Torelly	Limited Series. Main Cast
2010	S.O.S. Emergência	Melissa Kutner	Series. Guest. Episode: Nasce uma Estrela
2010	Afinal, o Que Querem as Mulheres?	Monique	
2010	A Princesa e o Vagabundo	Queen Valentina	TV Special.
2011	Acampamento de Férias 2 - A Arvore da Vida	mother of Lili	Limited Series. Cameo
2012	O Brado Retumbante	Antonia	Limited Series. Main Cast
2012	As Brasileiras	Sandra	Anthology Series. Episode: A Perseguida de Curitiba
2012	Sessão de Terapia	Júlia Rebelo	Series. Guest.
2012	Saia Justa	Herself	Presenter
2012	Lado a Lado	Jeanett Dórleac	Telenovela. Cameo
2013	Helen Palmer em Correio Feminino	Helen Palmer	Narrator
2015	Felizes para Sempre?	Marília Drummond	Limited Series. Main Cast
2017	A Força do Querer	Joyce Garcia	Telenovela. Main Cast
2024	Renascer	Cândida Gouveia	Telenovela. Guest Star

=== Theater ===
Year	Title	Role	Ref.
1997–98	Anchieta - Our story	Jaquaruna Indigenous	
2000–01	Passion of Christ	Maria	
2001–03	The Gospel According to Jesus Christ	Mary Magdalene	
2006–07	Small Marital Crimes	Lisa	
2010–11	Ligações Perigosas	Marquesa de Merteuil	
2013–14	Rabbit Hole	Becca	
2016	Troilus and Cressida	Cressida	
