= Cauã Reymond =

Brazilian actor and martial artist (born 1980)

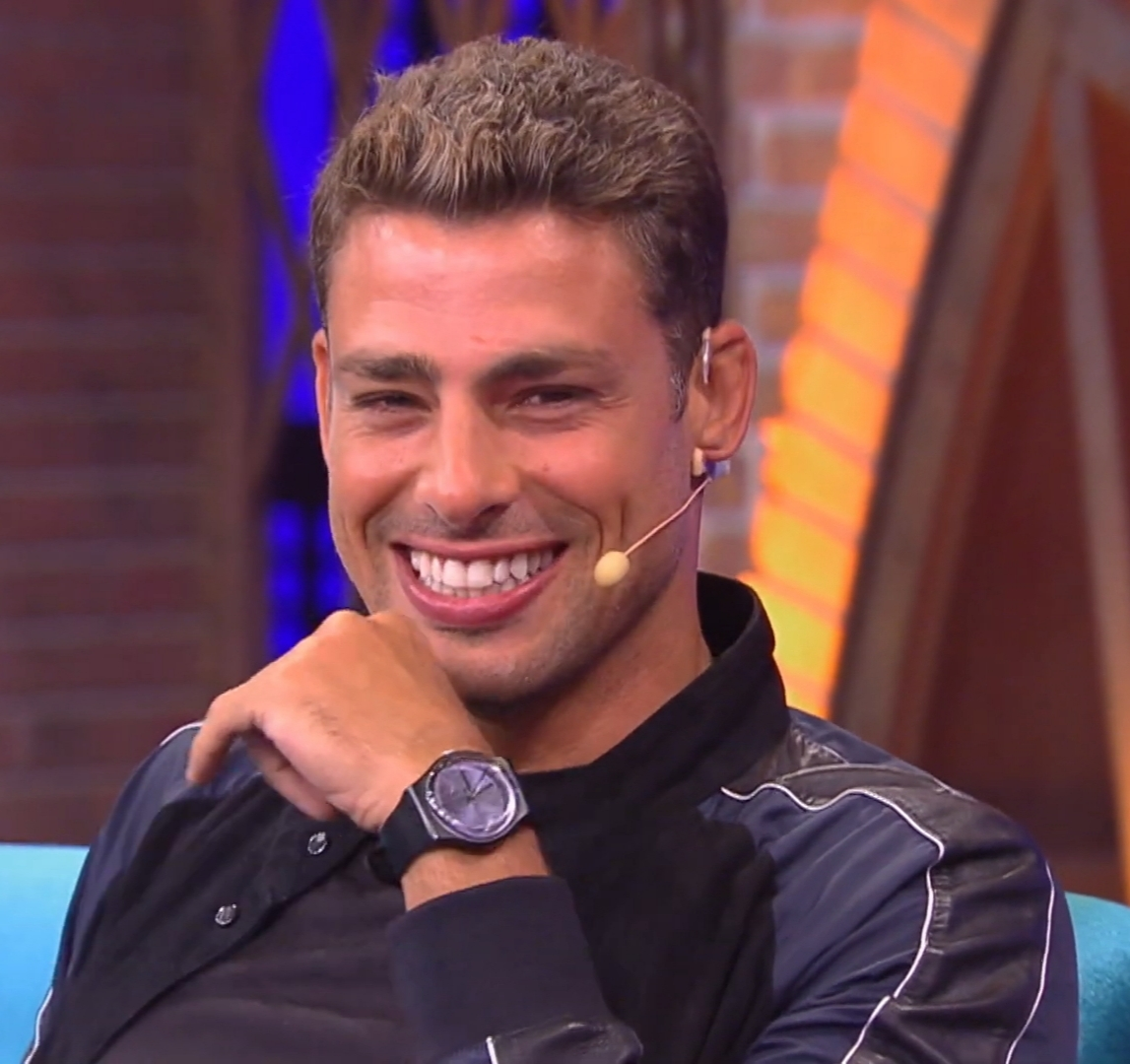
- Reymond in 2018
- Born: Cauã Reymond Marques; 20 May 1980 (age 46); Rio de Janeiro, Brazil
- Occupations: Actor; Audiovisual producer
- Spouse: Mariana Goldfarb (m. 2019; div. 2023)
- Children: 1
- Martial arts career
- Rank: 5th Dan–Brazilian jiu-jitsu
- Years active: 1992–present

Other information
- Website: www.cauareymond.com.br

Cauã Reymond Marques (/kaʊˈɑːn/ kow-AHN; Brazilian Portuguese pronunciation: [kaˈwɐ̃ ˈʁejmõ(dʒi) ˈmaʁkis]; born 20 May 1980) is a Brazilian actor and martial artist. He is best known for his television roles in Malhação and Cordel Encantado. His television credits include Belíssima, Passione, A Favorita, and Avenida Brasil. His most recent credits include Terra e Paixão (2023), Vale Tudo (2025) and a series regular role in All's Fair in 2026.

== Career ==
=== 1990s ===
Cauã's acting career began in the late 1990s in New York, where he was granted a scholarship by Professor Susan Batson, who trained actors such as Nicole Kidman and Tom Cruise. He moved to New York after a modeling career that took him to Milan and Paris where he worked with designers such as Jean Paul Gaultier and Gianfranco Ferré. One of the main campaigns he starred in was for Zoomp, alongside international models Gisele Bündchen and Fernanda Tavares. Also noteworthy are the São Paulo Fashion Weeks of 1999 and 2000, the editorial shoot for Karl Lagerfeld in Paris, and the Abercrombie & Fitch campaign photographed by Bruce Weber.

=== 2000s ===
Cauã debuted on TV Globo in 2002, playing Mau-Mau in the series Young Hearts, where he remained for two seasons. In 2004, he was in the main cast of the telenovela Shades of Sin, standing out in the role of the comical and charismatic fighter Thor Sardinha. This work earned him an invitation from writer Walter Negrão to play young fisherman Floriano in the telenovela Like a Wave.

In 2005, Cauã Reymond debuted in prime time on TV Globo as gigolo Mateus in the telenovela Belíssima. In the plot, his character only got involved with older women who were played by great Brazilian actresses like the flamboyant Ornella (Vera Holtz) and the villain Bia Falcão (Fernanda Montenegro). Mateus ended up with Bia Falcão in Paris.

In 2006, he was in Em Alto Mar, a play directed by brothers Adriano and Fernando Guimarães, with a season at the Banco do Brasil Cultural Center in Brasília. He was also in Essa Nossa Juventude, directed by Maria Luiza Mendonça and performed at Teatro Leblon in Rio de Janeiro.

In 2007, he joined the cast of the telenovela Eterna Magia as young writer Lucas Finnegan, who harbors a secret passion for his best friend Nina (Maria Flor).

In 2008, he played the rogue Halley in the telenovela The Favorite (2008). He received several awards for this performance, establishing himself in the market and consolidating his acting career.

=== 2010s ===
In 2010, Reymond joined the cast of the telenovela Passione as cyclist Danilo, a character who gets involved with drugs and ends up having a romantic relationship with the main antagonist of the story, the unscrupulous Clara (Mariana Ximenes).

In 2011, he played his first leading role in telenovelas as backcountry hero Jesuíno in The Enchanted Tale. In 2011, he played a producer and DJ in the film Estamos Juntos.

In 2012, Cauã Reymond played the young protagonist of Avenida Brasil in partnership with Deborah Falabella. Their characters, Jorginho and Nina, fall in love as children while living in a garbage dump and end up meeting again in the present. Jorginho is the son of the villain, Carminha (Adriana Esteves).

In 2013, he starred in the miniseries Doomed as Leandro Dantas, a real Don Juan. The series is written by George Moura and Sergio Goldenberg.

In 2014, Reymond starred in the police series The Hunter as former police officer André who "hunts" drug traffickers' enemies and fugitives for money.

In 2015, he featured in the telenovela A Regra do Jogo, his fourth time working with writer João Emanuel Carneiro.

In 2016, he was one of the protagonists of the series Justiça, portraying Maurício who is arrested for euthanasia after killing his wife Beatriz (Marjorie Estiano), a ballerina who is run over by Antenor (Antonio Calloni) at the beginning of the plot.

In 2017, he played the roles of twins Omar and Yaqub in the miniseries Dois Irmãos. This production aired two years after it was filmed. In 2018 through 2019, he played oil worker Dante, the protagonist of both seasons of the series Ilha de Ferro, developed for Globoplay.

=== 2020s ===
In 2021, Cauã starred in Um Lugar ao Sol, portraying twin brothers for the second time in his career.

In 2023, he was cast to play Caio Meirelles La Selva, the protagonist of the telenovela Land and Passion. In 2025, he played Cesar Ribeiro in Anything Goes, remake of the 1988 telenovela of the same name.

His next project is the Globoplay original series The Playoffs, conceived by him and will make its international debut at the SXSW festival in London in 2026. In addition to starring in the series, Cauã also had the opportunity to direct some scenes. With art direction by Bruno Safadi and screenplay by Thiago Dottori, the series focuses on Maurício, a former player who seeks to establish himself as an agent in the competitive soccer market.

In September 2026, Cauã joined the cast of Hulu's All's Fair as a series regular.

== Personal life ==
Cauã Reymond was born in Rio de Janeiro, is of Portuguese and Swiss descent, and is fluent in English. He spent part of his childhood in Nova Friburgo, Rio de Janeiro. During his adolescence, he lived with his father for three years in Balneário Camboriú, Santa Catarina.

Cauã Reymond is a 6th-degree black belt in Jiu-Jitsu and has practiced the martial art since he was 13 years old. He maintains a training routine that complements his acting career. Besides Jiu-Jitsu, he is dedicated to surfing, swimming, and weight training.

He is the father of Sofia Massafera Reymond (May 23, 2012), from his relationship with actress Grazi Massafera. They divorced in 2014. He lives in Rio de Janeiro as of 2026.

== Filmography ==
In his career of over 20 years, Cauã has performed in 18 films, 13 telenovelas, six TV series, and two theater plays. His most recent film is Pedro, Between the Devil and the Deep Blue Sea (2022), directed by Laís Bodanzky and co-produced by Reymond.

Film
| Year | Title | Role |
|---|---|---|
| 2004 | Ódiquê? | Tito |
| 2007 | Falsa Loura | Bruno |
| 2009 | Se Nada Mais Der Certo | Léo |
| 2009 | Divã | Murilo Almeida |
| 2009 | Flordelis - Basta uma Palavra para Mudar | |
| 2009 | À Deriva | Barman |
| 2009 | Não se Pode Viver sem Amor | João |
| 2010 | Borboletas Indômitas | |
| 2011 | Estamos Juntos | Murilo |
| 2011 | Meu País | Tiago |
| 2012 | Reis e Ratos | Hervê Gianini |
| 2014 | Alemão | Patrão Playboy |
| 2014 | Tim Maia | Fábio |
| 2017 | Don't Swallow My Heart, Alligator Girl! | |
| 2019 | Piedade | Sandro |
| 2022 | A Viagem de Pedro | Pedro I of Brazil |

Television
| Year | Title | Role | Notes |
|---|---|---|---|
| 2002 | Malhação | Maurício Terra (Maumau) | |
| 2003 | Malhação | Maurício Terra (Maumau) | |
| 2003 | Cidade dos Homens | Himself | Special participation |
| 2004 | Da Cor do Pecado | Thor Sardinha | |
| 2004 | Como uma Onda | Floriano | |
| 2005 | Belíssima | Mateus Güney | |
| 2006 | Minha Nada Mole Vida | Guga Bergatin | Special participation |
| 2007 | Eterna Magia | Lucas Finnegan | |
| 2008 | A Favorita | Halley Gonzaga | |
| 2008 | Episódio Especial | Himself | Special participation |
| 2009 | Episódio Especial | Himself | Special participation |
| 2010 | Passione | Danilo Gouveia | |
| 2011 | Cordel Encantado | Jesuíno Araújo | |
| 2012 | Avenida Brasil | Jorginho de Souza Araújo | |
| 2014 | Amores Roubados | Leandro Dantas | |
| 2015 | A Regra do Jogo | Juliano Pereira | |
| 2017 | Dois Irmãos | Omar and Yaqub | |
| 2018–2019 | Ilha de Ferro | Dante Giordano | |
| 2021 | Um Lugar ao Sol | Christian and Renato | |
| 2023 | Terra e Paixão | Caio La Selva | |
| 2025 | Vale Tudo | César Ribeiro | |
| 2026 | Jogada de Risco | Maurício Conceição | Main role; also creator |
| 2026 | All's Fair | Raul Ortiz | Series regular (season 2) |

== Awards ==
Cauã won the Best Actor award at the Los Angeles Film Festival, at the Miami International Film Festival, and at the Brazilian Film Festival of Toronto for his performance in If Nothing Else Works Out (2009). His performance in Mercy (2021) earned him the Best Supporting Actor award at the Los Angeles Film Festival and at the Brasília Film Festival.

| Year | Awards | Title | Work |
|---|---|---|---|
| 2008 | Troféu Imprensa | Melhor Ator | A Favorita |
| 2008 | Troféu Internet | Melhor Ator | A Favorita |
| 2008 | Prêmio Contigo de Televisão | Melhor Ator | A Favorita |
| 2008 | Prêmio Melhores do Ano | Melhor Ator Coadjuvante | A Favorita |
| 2008 | Prêmio Extra de Televisão | Melhor Ator Coadjuvante | A Favorita |
| 2010 | Prêmio Extra de Televisão | Melhor Ator Coadjuvante | Passione |
