= Câmara Cascudo =

Brazilian academic (1898–1986)

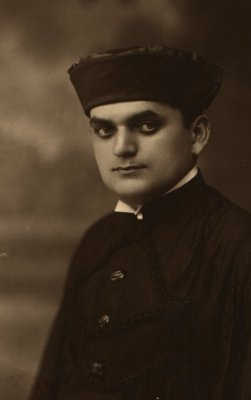
Luís da Câmara Cascudo

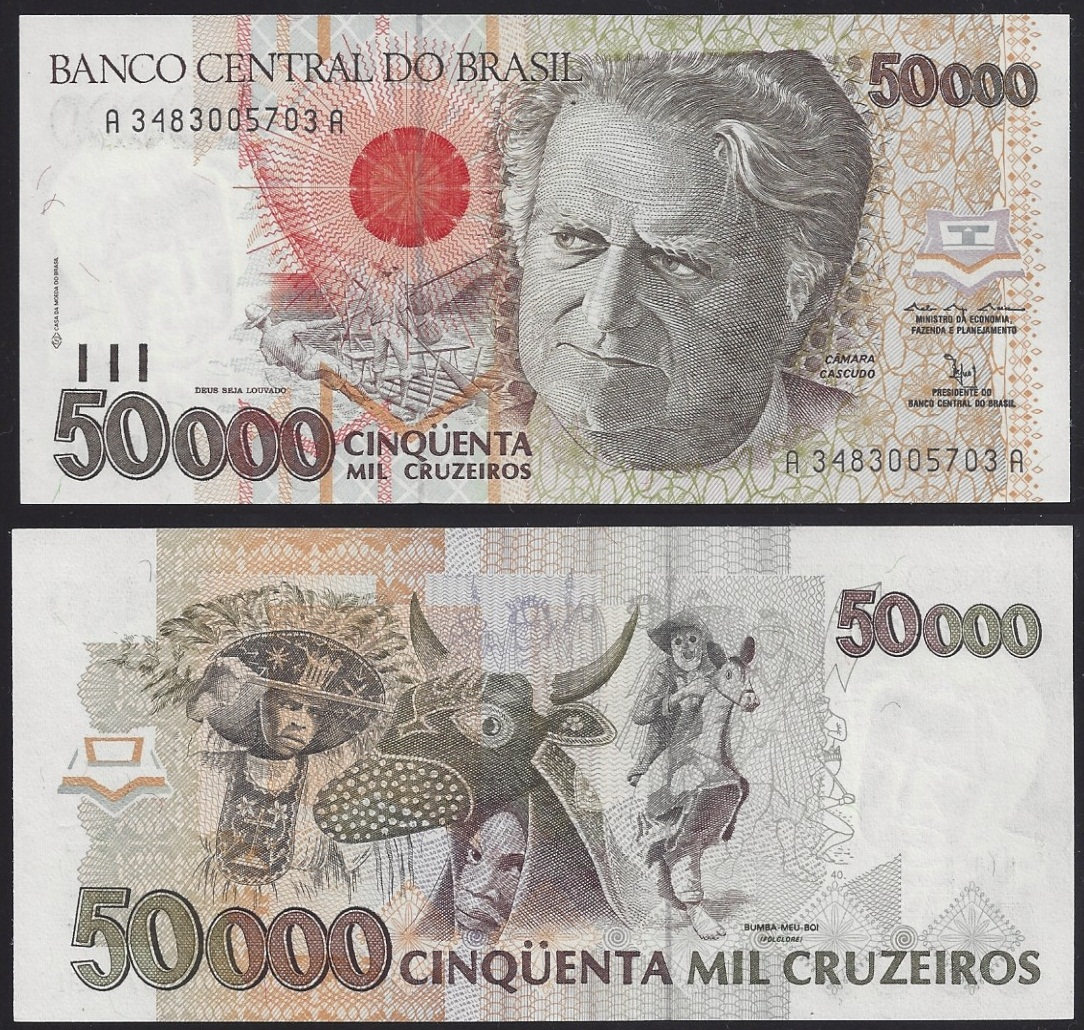
Câmara Cascudo on a 1991 50,000 Brazilian cruzeiros banknote

Luís da Câmara Cascudo (30 December 1898 – 30 July 1986) was a Brazilian anthropologist, folklorist, journalist, historian, lawyer, and lexicographer.

He was born in Natal, Northeast Brazil. He lived his entire life in Natal and dedicated himself to the study of Brazilian culture and he was a professor at the Federal University of Rio Grande do Norte. He was also interested in music and was a co-founder of the Natal Instituto de Música in 1933. The institute of anthropology there now bears his name.

He was a member of the Brazilian Historic and Geographic Institute.

== Books ==
As a researcher into the manifestations of the Brazilian cultures, he left behind an extensive body of work. Câmara Cascudo wrote 31 books on Brazilian folklore, over 8000 pages. He has done the most extensive work on Brazilian folklore so far, with notable quality, and he has received recognition for it.

- Alma patrícia (1921 his first work),
- Traditional Tales of Brazil (1946).
- Dictionary of Brazilian Folklore (1952).
- Made in Africa, pesquísas e notas, 1965, and later editions
- His studies of the period of the Dutch invasions of Brazil led to the publication of his Geography of Dutch Brazil.
- His memoirs, Time and I (1971) were edited posthumously.
