= Festival Internacional da Canção =

Televised Brazilian music festival

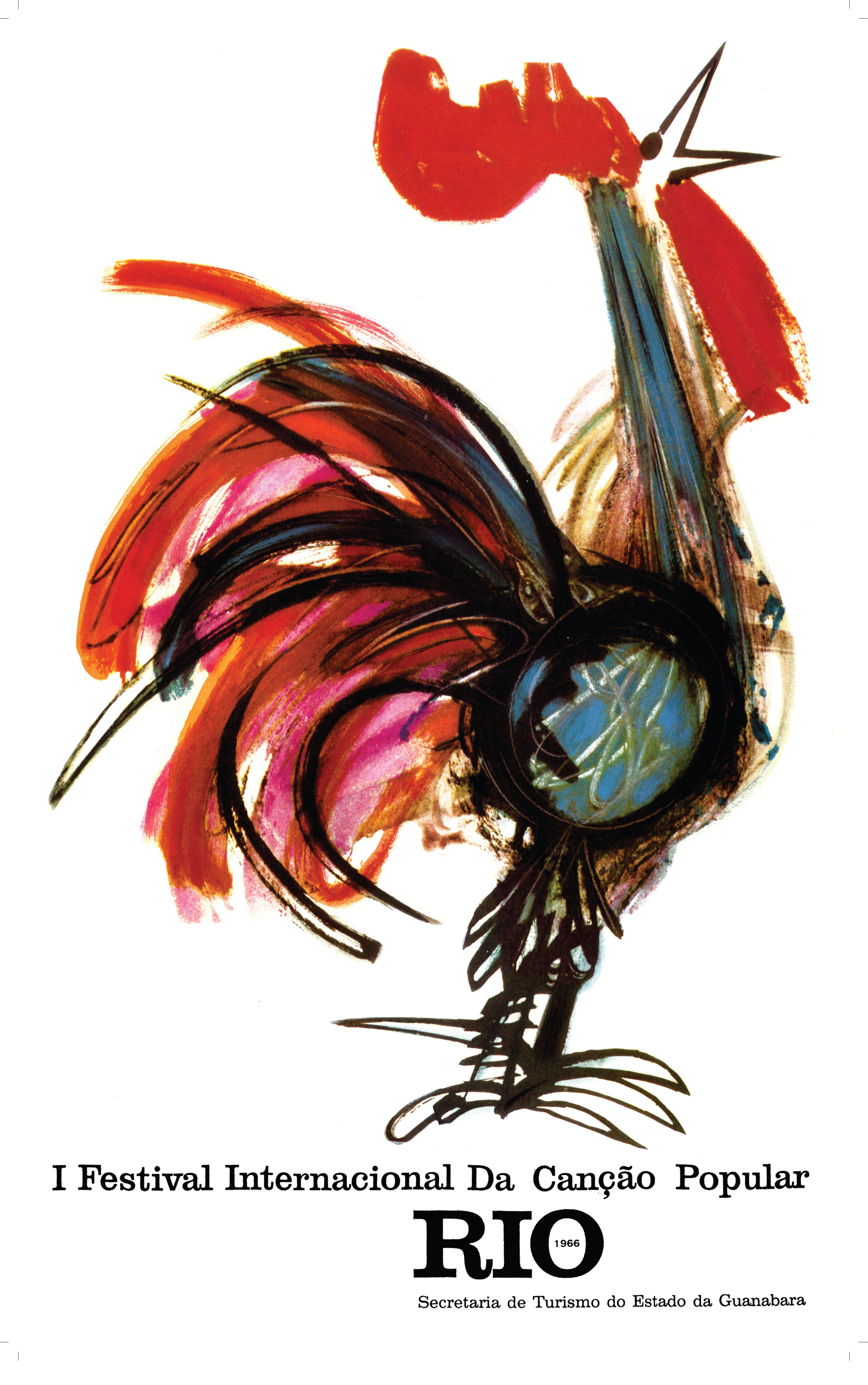
- Poster for the first festival designed by Ziraldo
- Presented by: Hilton Gomes
- Opening theme: "Hino do Festival Internacional da Canção" composed by Erlon Chaves and Ronaldo Bôscoli
- Country of origin: Brazil
- Original language: Portuguese
- No. of episodes: 7

Production
- Production location: Rio de Janeiro
- Production companies: TV Rio (1966); TV Globo (1967–1972)

Original release
- Release: 1966 – 1972

The Festival Internacional da Canção (FIC; also known as the Festival Internacional da Canção Popular) was an annual televised music competition held at the Ginásio do Maracanãzinho in Rio de Janeiro from 1966 to 1972. The festival was created by journalist Augusto Marzagão with the goal of rivaling the Festival de Música Popular Brasileira hosted by TV Record. The competition consisted of two sections: a national phase (consisting of only Brazilian songwriters) and an international phase (consisting of all attending countries including the winners of the national phase). The winners of each phase were given the Golden Rooster Award (Portuguese: Galo de Ouro), produced by jewelry firm H. Stern and designed by Ziraldo.

Despite only having a seven-year run, the festival featured some of the most influential musicians in Brazilian music such as Os Mutantes, Antônio Carlos Jobim, Vinicius de Moraes, and Gilberto Gil. It also helped launch the careers of several notable artists, including Raul Seixas and Milton Nascimento.

The festival functioned as a propaganda tool for the Brazilian military dictatorship to promote the country abroad while conversely featuring protest songs that highlighted the political discontent within the country. Several editions featured demonstrations against the dictatorship and government censorship. Some featured expressions of black pride. As a result, many iterations of the festival were marked by controversy.

== Formation ==
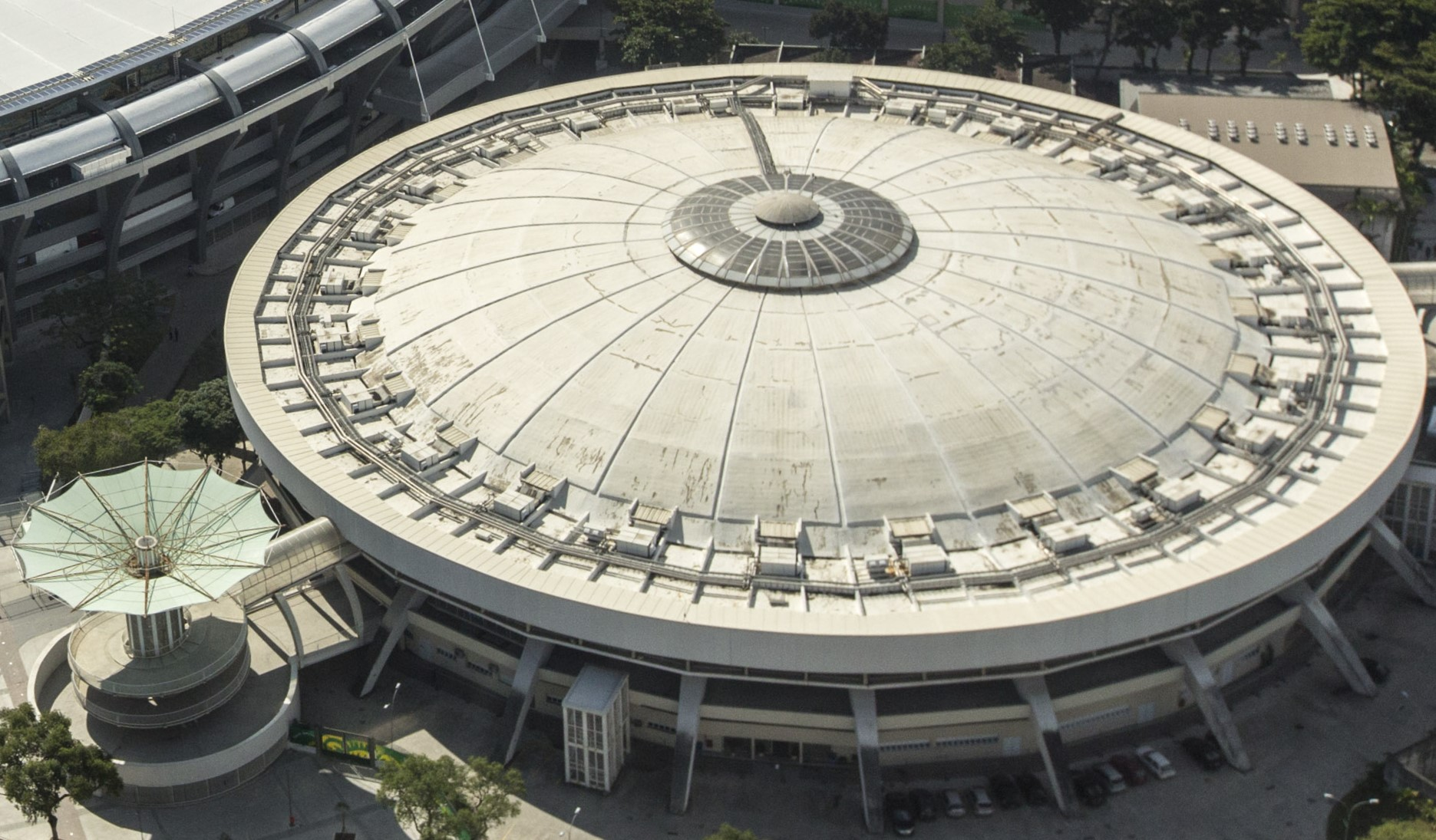
The Maracanãzinho hosted all editions of the festival

Augusto Marzagão was a journalist and businessman who befriended several important politicians, executives, and musicians across Brazil. He was a friend of Jânio Quadros, serving as his secretary while he was governor of São Paulo. After Quadros was elected president of Brazil in 1961, Marzagão was given the role of director of public relations for the Instituto Brasileiro do Café. Through this function, he witnessed the Sanremo Music Festival while advertising abroad in Italy.

Inspired by the format of the festival in Sanremo, Marzagão enlisted the help of Francisco Negrão de Lima, the governor of the State of Guanabara, to create a music festival for Rio de Janeiro. Lima was enthusiastic to help, as it would rival the Festival de Música Popular Brasileira hosted in São Paulo and bring tourism to Rio, which was lacking attractions. At the same time, it would also help improve international relations, which had become strained due to the 1964 Brazilian coup d'état. With the backing of the Tourism Minister of Guanabara, João Paulo do Rio Branco, Marzagão began looking for a broadcaster and venue.

Marzagão initially asked TV Globo, the largest network in South America, to be the broadcaster, but its executive, Walter Clark, was hesitant to commit resources to such an expensive and new festival. Marzagão instead looked toward TV Rio. With support from its executives and music director Erlon Chaves, it became the official broadcaster for the inaugural event. For the venue, both the Teatro Carlos Gomes and Theatro Municipal were considered. The management teams for each opera hall were worried that a popular music festival would draw too large and ill-mannered a crowd compared to the normal attendees. After some more searching, the Maracanãzinho was suggested by Paulo Tapajós (a member of the planning committee) due to its large capacity. However, the gymnasium was designed for basketball games and had never held any sort of musical event. Chaves and Marzagão ran some acoustics tests in the space and were disappointed. Nonetheless, with no other alternative, the gymnasium was chosen to host the event. To advertise the event, and to ensure the stadium would be filled with attendees to improve acoustics, several hundreds of tickets for the national phase were given away for free.

== Editions ==
=== 1966 ===
The first festival saw nearly two thousand original songs submitted for the national phase of the competition, exceeding the expectations of the organizers. To choose the songs that would be performed and judged at the festival, a preliminary committee made up of noted scholars and musicians—including César Guerra-Peixe, Marques Rebelo, and Lindolfo Gaya—was assembled. Among the thirty-six songs chosen were compositions by Vinícius de Moraes, Alcyvando Luz, and Billy Blanco.

The presenters for the first festival were Murilo Néri, a soap opera star, and Adalgisa Colombo, the former Miss Brazil. The jury for the national phase was a twenty-three member panel made up of noted Carioca journalists, music critics, musicians, and scholars, chaired by musicologist Mozart de Araújo. The competition was formatted in three rounds over three nights; eighteen songs were heard in each of the first two rounds, and the top fourteen songs chosen from either night moved on to the final round. After several hectic performances, filled with technical issues from a hastily constructed set, the top three songs for the national phase were announced: "Dia das Rosas", written and performed by Maysa Matarazzo, placed third; "O Cavaleiro", written by Geraldo Vandré and performed by Tuca, placed second; "Saveiros", written by Dori Caymmi and Nelson Motta, with a performance by Nana Caymmi, placed first. Named after the traditional fishing vessel, "Saveiros" was inspired by the fishermen of Bahia and chosen by the panel for its unique complexity. As the winning song, it represented Brazil in the international phase.

The international phase contained representatives from twenty-seven countries, including Brazil. Mighty Sparrow, who was supposed to represent Trinidad and Tobago, was disqualified for not arriving in time. Noted performers included Eduard Khil, representing the Soviet Union, Dúo Dinámico representing Spain, and Gogi Grant representing the United States. The format paralleled the national phase, with qualifiers held over two nights and a final on the third. This format was used going forward. The jury was also altered, now containing international stars such as Henry Mancini, Horst Jankowski, and chairman of the jury, Chico Buarque. With the song "Frag den Wind", written by Helmut Zacharias, lyricized by Carl J. Schauber, and performed by Inge Brück, Germany was declared the winner. This victory allowed Brück to represent Germany at the upcoming Eurovision Song Contest. The winner of the national phase and representative of Brazil, "Saveiros", placed second. The song "L'Amour Toujours L'Amour", sung by Guy Mardel, the representative of France, placed third.

=== 1967 ===
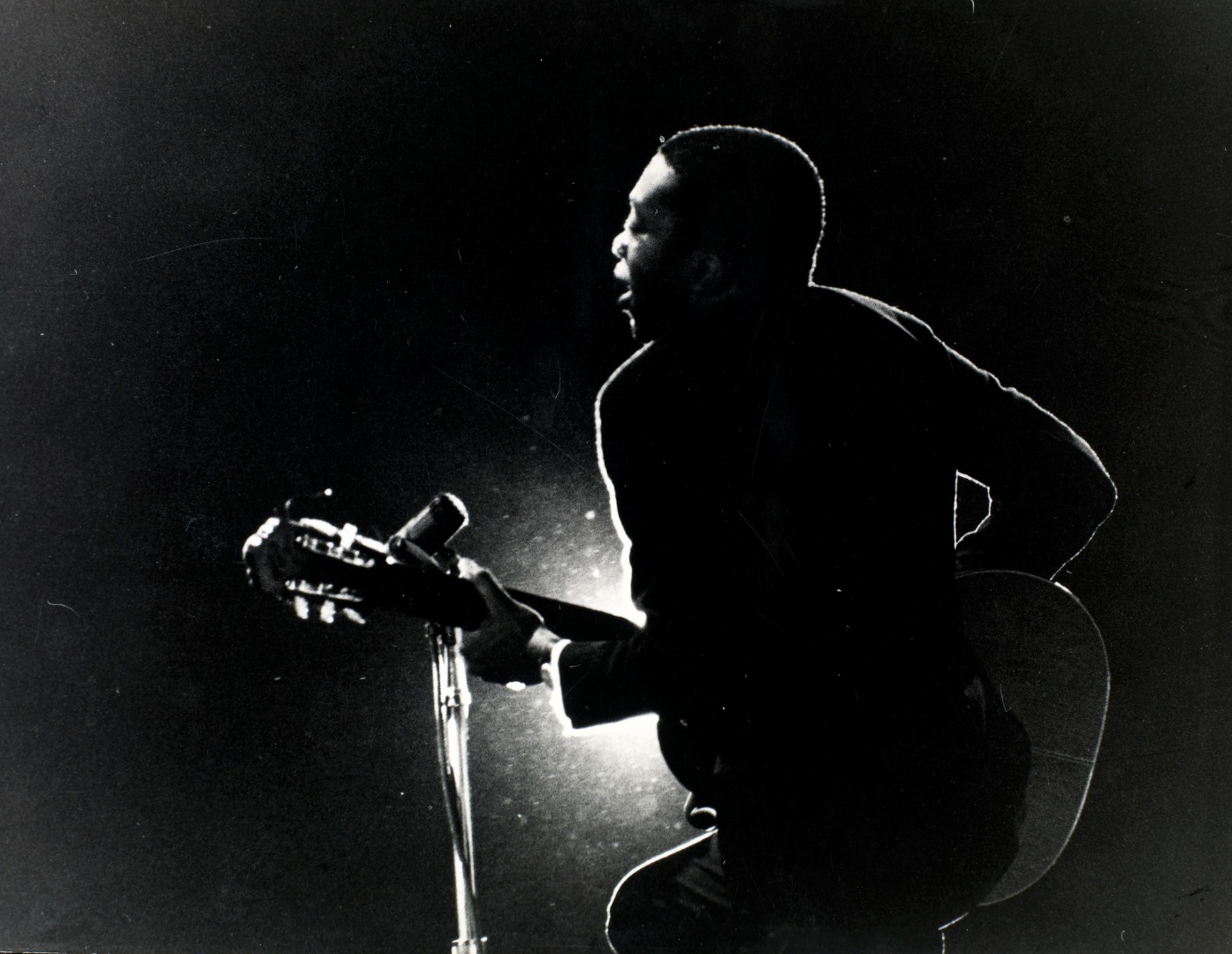
Milton Nascimento performing at the 1967 edition of the festival

The second festival was the first to be broadcast by TV Globo as Walter Clark was now eager to get involved after the success of the first. This allowed Hilton Gomes (the anchor of its flagship news program Jornal da Globo) to henceforth serve as the presenter. Thanks to a larger budget and with the hope of attracting more sponsors, the competition was lengthened and several renovations were done to the gymnasium. This included a new stage, sound system, and improvements to the dressing rooms. Originally, forty songs were selected to compete in the national phase. However, the secretary of tourism for Guanabara, Carlos de Laet, made an executive decision to alter the list of songs that had been chosen by the committee. This caused several artists to pull out of the festival, including songwriters Carolina Cardoso de Menezes and Tito Madi, who would have benefited from the alterations. After several back-and-forth meetings, a final list of forty-six songs was made that included those which Laet had removed. Milton Nascimento was the most represented on the list with three songs.

Nascimento was a minor artist at the time, but had impressed Agostinho dos Santos while playing at a bar. Dos Santos advocated for Nascimento to enter the festival, but Nascimento refused, discouraged after receiving a poor audience reaction at the Festival Nacional de Música Popular Brasileira a year prior. Dos Santos instead asked Nascimento to record three songs for a fictitious upcoming album. After the songs were recorded, Agostinho secretly sent the tapes to the festival committee. Only learning of the entry after being accepted, Nascimento felt no other choice but to perform.

The juries were chaired by conductor Isaac Karabtchevsky for the national phase and Henry Mancini for the international phase. The first round of competition opened with a work by choro composer Pixinguinha that was sung by Ademilde Fonseca. This was followed by two of the entries from Nascimento, which included "Travessia" (better known in English as "Bridges"). The songs, with orchestral arrangements by Eumir Deodato, were praised by both the audience and the jury, establishing him as one of the strongest competitors. For the second round, Nascimento performed "Morro Velho", his third and final song, reportedly drawing an even larger crowd than the first night. All of his songs made the final round and were later recorded on his debut album.

In third place for the national phase was "Carolina", written by Chico Buarque and performed by sisters Cynara and Cybele of Quarteto em Cy. Buarque had only entered the competition under the condition that a fine he incurred from Walter Clark for breaching a contract earlier that year be waived and was surprised to have placed so high. Meanwhile, Nascimento earned second place with "Travessia" and received the special designation of best performer. Record producer Creed Taylor, who was in attendance, was so impressed by Nascimento that he immediately signed him to his label for a three-album deal, beginning with Courage. The national phase was won by the song "Margarida", written and performed by Guttemberg Guarabyra alongside his band, Grupo Manifesto. The song (based on "Seche tes Larmes, Marie", a French folk tune) was another crowd favorite and was chosen by the jury for its unique structure that allowed the audience to sing along even during its debut performance.

The international phase grew to contain thirty-two countries that competed under the same format as the year prior. In third place was Brazil, represented by "Margarida", the national winner. In second place was the United States, represented by "And the World Goes On", written by Quincy Jones and Alan and Marilyn Bergman with a performance by Patti Austin. The festival was won by Italy with "Per una Donna", a ballad written by Marcello di Martino, Giulio Perreta, and Corrado Mantoni. Performed by Jimmy Fontana, it was loudly booed when announced as the winner, as the crowd had greatly favored "Margarida".

=== 1968 ===
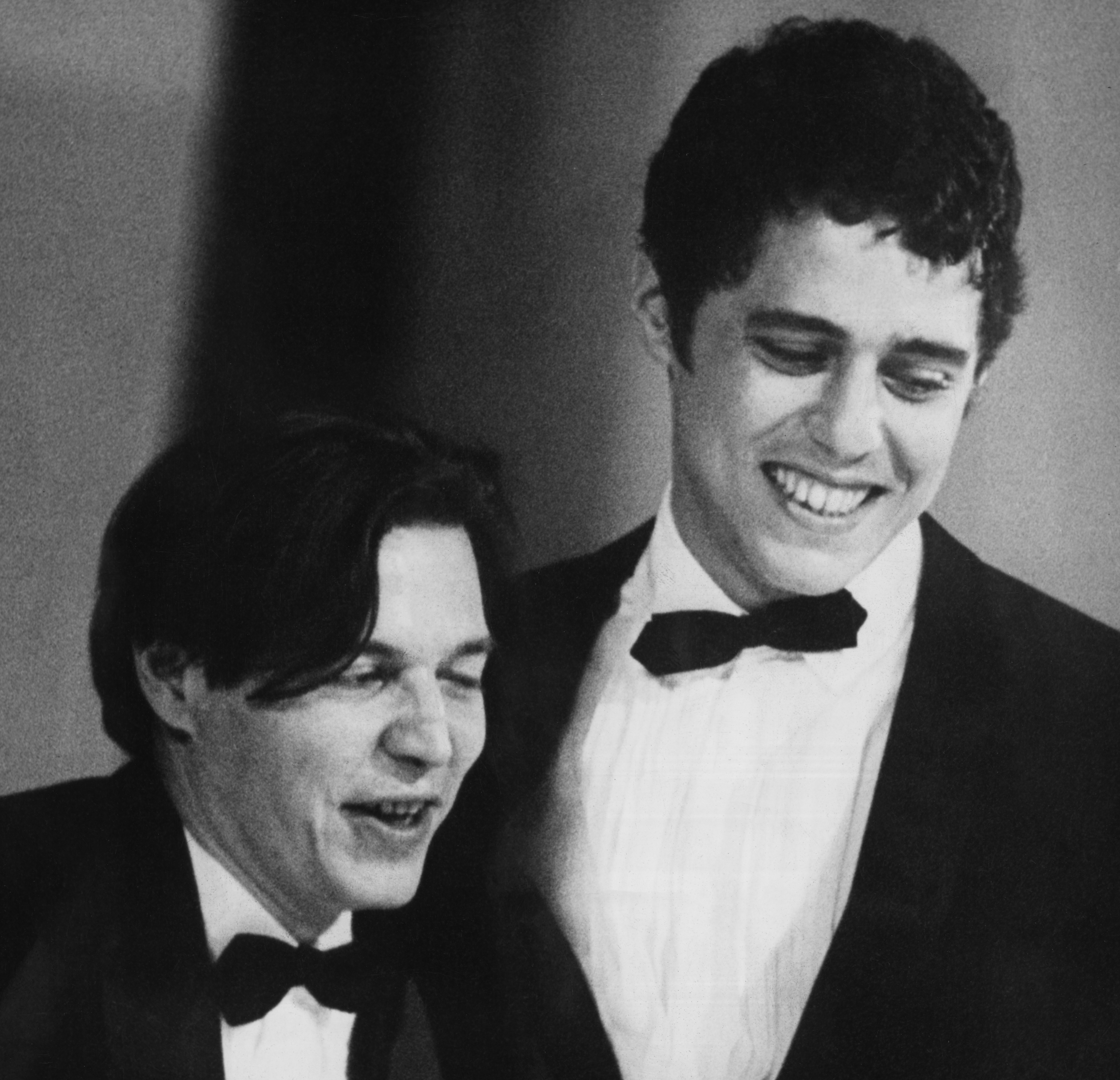
Antônio Carlos Jobim and Chico Buarque receiving their award for winning the international phase in 1968

After complaints of a Rio bias, it was decided that the national phase would be altered so that the largest states were guaranteed songs in the festival. São Paulo was guaranteed six songs, Minas Gerais was guaranteed two, and Bahia, Pernambuco, Paraná and Rio Grande do Sul were each guaranteed one. Instead of a simple committee, the Teatro da Pontifícia Universidade Católica de São Paulo would host a preliminary concert to choose the six songs that would represent São Paulo. In addition to better representing Paulista musicians, the concert would also help Globo pull viewers away from the rival Festival de Música Popular Brasileira hosted in the city by TV Record.

The third edition is best remembered for an unruly audience that harassed several of the musicians. The temperament of the audience is retrospectively viewed as a reflection of the growing angst toward the increasingly censorial government alongside the perceived degradation of traditional Brazilian music due to foreign influences. Tropicália, which took its inspiration from psychedelic rock, was one such controversial musical movement featured during the festival. Its reception during the São Paulo phase was overwhelmingly negative. In one example, tropicália pioneer Gilberto Gil was booed and disqualified after performing the "Questão de Ordem" (a Jimi Hendrix-inspired rock song) due to its supposed incendiary content. In another, Caetano Veloso and his backing band, Os Mutantes, were booed and pelted with garbage while performing their song "É Proibido Proibir" (lit. 'It is Forbidden to Forbid') during the São Paulo finals. The song (inspired by the French aphorism used during May 68) featured electric guitars and Veloso dressed in a gaudy, plastic outfit. With such traits, it was considered a representation of capitalist America, which was seen as a corrupting force among the leftist student crowd. In response to the overwhelmingly negative crowd reaction, Veloso stopped playing and gave a speech. He opened with a question—"But is this the youth who wants to take power?" (Note: Original: "Mas é isso que é a juventude que diz que quer tomar o poder?")—before protesting the earlier disqualification of Gil and the political climate of Brazil in a sequence of events described as defining the generation. Although "É Proibido Proibir" was one of the six songs chosen by the jury, Veloso refused to attend the national phase in Rio. Only Os Mutantes, with their entry "Caminhante Noturno", represented tropicália at the Maracanãzinho.

Antônio Carlos Jobim, a neighbor of Marzagão, had been personally invited to have some sort of role in the festival. Since Jobim did not feel comfortable judging his colleagues as part of the jury, he opted to compete instead. With Chico Buarque as his lyricist, he wrote "Sabiá", a bossa nova song performed by Cynara and Cybele. The song was well-applauded by the audience back in Rio and easily made it to finals. Nonetheless, the undeniable favorite of the crowd was "Pra Não Dizer que Não Falei das Flores" (lit. 'Not To Say That I Didn't Talk About The Flowers'), written and performed by Geraldo Vandré. Also known by the shortened name "Caminhando" (lit. 'Walking'), the song was a thinly veiled protest against the Brazilian government. Unlike the other songs that featured orchestral backings, Vandré performed solo, backing himself with just a guitar.

In third place for the national phase was "Andança" by Edmundo Souto, Paulinho Tapajós, and Danilo Caymmi. It was performed by Beth Carvalho with the Golden Boys as her backing band, and it later became widely recognized as her signature song. When second place was announced as "Caminhando", the crowd began to boo the decision, believing it should have won. When accepting his award and preparing an encore, Vandré gave a speech, declaring that Jobim and Buarque deserved greater respect. Afterward, when "Sabia" was declared the winner, the boos instead intensified. Jobim later admitted that he cried on the way home that evening, stunned by how the crowd had reacted. His son, Paulo Jobim, called it the "darkest day of his [father's] life".

In his autobiography, Walter Clark reveals that he was ordered by General Siseno Sarmento, leader of the Eastern Military Command, to ensure that "Caminhando" and "América, América" (a song by Cesar Roldão Vieira that had also made finals) did not win due to their potentially subversive lyrics. While Clark maintained that "Sabiá" won without any interference on his part, the national jury was chaired by Donatello Grieco. It is believed that as a Brazilian diplomat, Grieco may have placed pressure on the other jurors to prevent "Caminhando" from winning. Afterward, "Caminhando" was banned by the government, and Vandré was forced into exile, fleeing to Chile. Likewise, Veloso and Gil were arrested and exiled to London that following December, partly due to their performances in São Paulo.

The international jury was chaired by Harry Warren and included composers Elmer Bernstein and Paul Mauriat. The United States came in third with "Mary" written by Nelson Riddle, lyricized by Norman Gimbel, and performed by West Coast singer Michael Dees. Canada placed second with "This Crazy World", a protest song written and performed by Paul Anka. The ultimate winner was Brazil with "Sabia", once again booed when announced the winner. Despite the dissatisfied crowd, the festival was an economic success.

=== 1969 ===
The fourth festival was the first to be held after the enactment of Institutional Act Number Five (AI-5), passed the previous December. Among other things, the AI-5 allowed for broader censorship of music. In addition, Charles Burke Elbrick, the United States ambassador to Brazil, had been kidnapped a few weeks before the event. Because of these circumstances, several foreign artists, including George Harrison and Jack Jones, announced that they would not attend the festival. This edition of the festival also marked its first broadcast in Europe, motivating the organizers to secure prominent performers, recognizing its potential to influence and improve deteriorating international relations. Because of this, it was also among the first programs in Brazilian television history to be recorded in color, using two imported cameras from Saarländischer Rundfunk. This color version was broadcast by Eurovision the following January.

The festival continued the same format from the year prior, including the São Paulo preliminaries. Compared to the previous edition, the festival ran smoothly, in part due to government suppression preventing any protest songs. The notable exception to this was "Gotham City" by Jards Macalé and José Carlos Capinan, which had managed to slip past the censors. The song used the fictional city from Batman as a metaphor for Brazil, noting in the lyrics that the narrator would "only be free if [he left] Gotham City". (Note: Original: "Só serei livre se sair de Gotham city")

Both the national and international juries were chaired by Wilson Simonal de Castro. The winner for the national phase was "Cantiga por Luciana", a waltz by Edmundo Souto and Paulinho Tapajós. It was performed by Evinha, a former member of the vocal trio Trio Esperança, and had won the crowd vote effortlessly. In second place was "Juliana", written and performed by Antônio Adolfo and Tibério Gaspar. In third place was "Visão Geral" by César Costa Filho, Ruy Maurity and Ronaldo Monteiro de Souza.

Brazil went on to win the international phase for the second year in a row. In second place, the United States was represented with "Evie", a song written by Jimmy Webb and performed by Bill Medley. The English entry, which finished third, was the most applauded performance of the event. Written by Les Reed and Barry Mason, "Love Is All" was a ballad performed by Malcolm Roberts. It was so popular among the audience that they began to boo both Brazil and the United States after placements were announced, despite "Cantiga por Luciana" receiving such a positive response during the national phase. Medley later stated that he believed "Cantiga por Luciana" deserved to win, commenting that it had the perfect balance between the popularity of "Love Is All" and the songwriting quality of "Evie". Despite the dissatisfaction towards the winners once again, it was described by organizers as the calmest festival to date.

=== 1970 ===
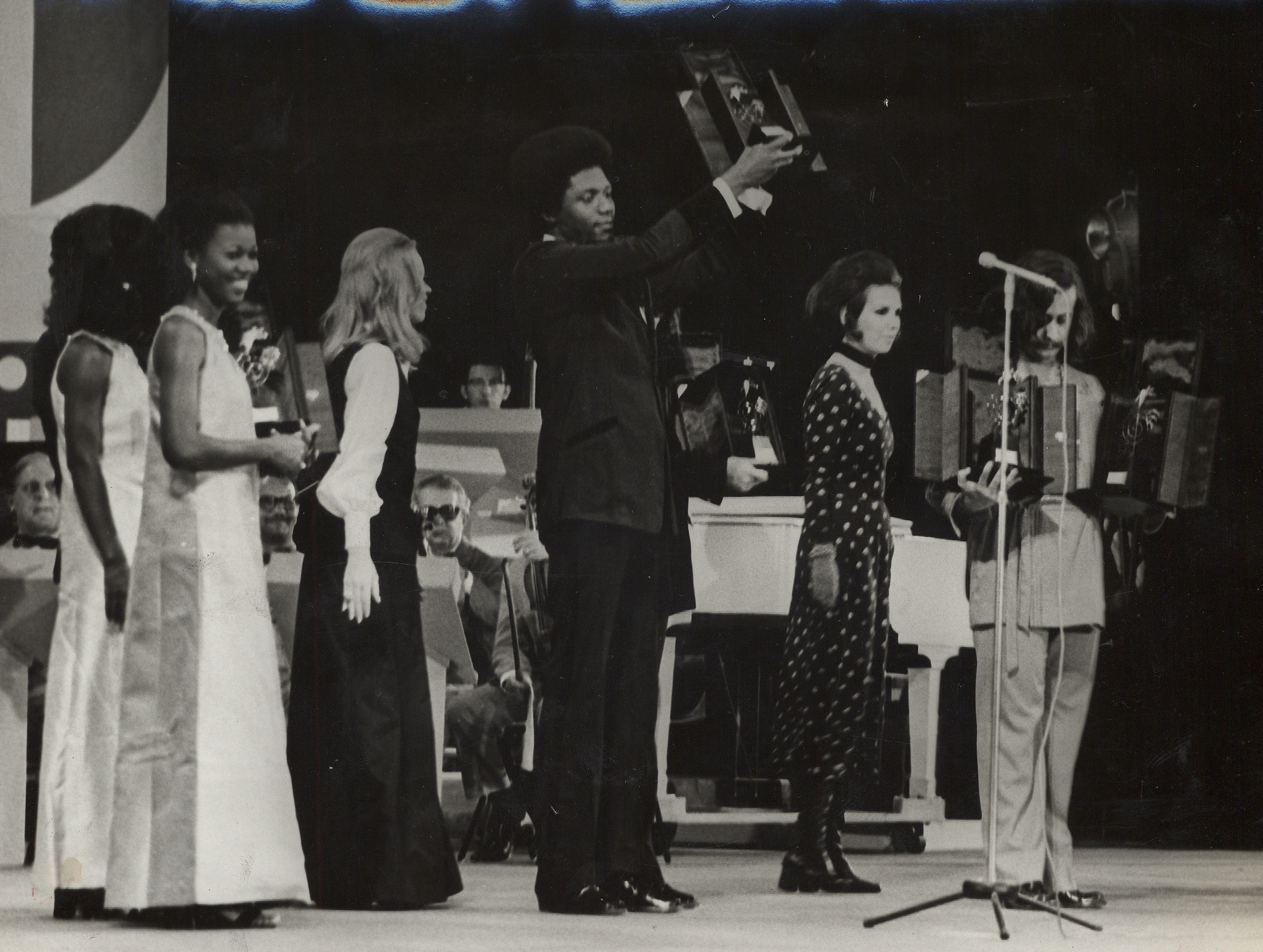
Tony Tornado and Trio Ternura receiving the national award at the 1970 edition of the festival

The fifth festival started rife with issues. The gymnasium of the Maracanãzinho had caught fire in early January and repairs were behind schedule. Because of the fire damage, the event was postponed for three weeks, leading half a dozen countries to drop out. In addition, jurors Jimmy Webb, Astrud Gilberto, and Amália Rodrigues had pulled out at the last second. In their place were Paul Simon, who served as chairman of the international jury, and Marcos Valle.

For the first time, there was also a popular jury composed of seven members chosen randomly from the audience and chaired by comedian Chacrinha. In addition, this festival was another major milestone in Brazilian broadcasting, being the first fully color broadcast transmitted via satellite to other countries.

This edition of the festival reflected the growing movimento negro through the expanded presence of Afro-Brazilian musicians. One example was Dom Salvador, who performed the spiritual "Abolição 1860–1960" with a band dressed in bright African robes. Another was Jorge Ben, who entered with "Eu Também Quero Mocotó" (lit. 'I Want Mocotó Too'), a soul song sung by Erlon Chaves, the former music director for the festival. The song used mocotó (a Brazilian dish) as slang for female legs. It was popular with the audience and invited to be performed again during the closing ceremony of the international phase. For this final performance, Chaves performed a new routine where he was kissed by a couple of the white background dancers. This led to his arrest for public indecency, alongside Globo network executive Boni, under orders of the military. Both were later released, but Chaves was banned from performing for thirty days. It is largely believed he was only arrested because the image of a black man being kissed by white women had offended the conservative dictatorship. Afterward, "I want mocotó" became a popular slogan for ridiculing the government. (Note: In one case, the editors of O Pasquim were all arrested after publishing an edited version of Independence or Death with a speech bubble from Pedro I of Brazil saying "eu quero mocotó".)

The national jury was chaired by Paulinho da Viola. In third place was "Encouraçado", written by Sueli Costa, lyricized by poet Tite de Lemos, and performed by Fábio. In second place was "O amor é o meu país", written and performed by Ivan Lins and Ronaldo Monteiro de Souza. The winning song was "BR-3", named for the highway of the same name. A soul song in the style of James Brown, it was written by Antonio Adolfo and Tibério Gaspar. Singer Tony Tornado and backing vocal group Trio Ternura became the first black musicians to win. Tornado became well-known after his performance, thanks in part to his flamboyant outfits and acrobatic dancing.

The international phase was won by Argentina; Piero de Benedictus wrote and performed the ballad "Pedro Nadie" with the help of frequent collaborator and lyricist José Tcherkaski. In second place was Yugoslavia with the song "The World Is Mine", written by Alfi Kabiljo and sung by Radojka Šverko. Breaking its winning streak, Brazil took third.

=== 1971 ===
The sixth festival was heavily impacted by government censorship. With few entrants signed up, Marzagão invited prominent past performers and offered them guaranteed spots in the festival. Several accepted the invitation, but now each song submitted had to be screened by the federal police in a new, lengthier process. The government exerted more control over the festival as a whole, recognizing its importance as a propaganda tool to promote a positive image of the dictatorship overseas. Because of this, less than two weeks before the festival, twelve musicians pulled their entries and released a letter declaring that government censorship had made it impossible for them to participate. Among the signees were Vinicius de Moraes, Paulinho da Viola, and Marcos Valle alongside past winners Guttemberg Guarabyra, Antônio Carlos Jobim, and Chico Buarque. As these musicians were among the biggest stars in Brazil, it greatly hurt the foreign image of the country, and the government attempted to repress the letter. Everyone who signed the letter was subsequently arrested and interrogated by the police. The international journalist who had published the letter overseas was deported. In addition, Taiguara, Hermínio Bello de Carvalho, and Maurício Tapajós had their songs outright rejected by the censorship committee.

In a rush, Globo filled the large number of missing entries with its unreleased material, using themes from upcoming telenovelas and unreleased material recorded for Som Livre. This led to fifty songs accepted, the most of any edition. To sell more tickets, the band Santana was invited. While opening night was packed, mainly due to the promise of Santana, the competitors were not as well received as years past. It was reported that only three songs received any applause. This included "O Visitante", written by Jorge Amiden and César das Mercês, which was performed by O Terço in one of their earliest national appearances. As a result of poor song quality, the second night of the festival had the smallest audience in its history.

Aside from the striking songwriters, the festival was also marked by racial tensions. Wanting to further publicize the discrimination of Afro-Brazilians after winning the last festival, Tony Tornado guest performed the song "Black is Beautiful" in a duet with Elis Regina. (Note: The song was originally released on her album Ela.) Written by brothers Marcos and Paulo Sérgio Valle, the song featured lyrics from the perspective of a white woman who prefers black men over white men. To promote black pride, Tornado took the stage with a large afro and raised his fist in a black power salute. He was arrested while performing and exiled to Uruguay soon after. (Note: For the next year, Tornado was forced to move to various other countries, including North Korea and Czechoslovakia, before being able to return to Brazil.)

Actress Regina Duarte served as the president of the national jury and Grande Otelo served as president of the popular jury. The national phase was won by "Kyrie", a song written by budding songwriters Paulinho Soares and Marcelo Silva with a backing orchestral arrangement by Leonardo Bruno. It was performed by Trio Ternura, the same trio of siblings that had backed Tony Tornado during the last festival. Second place was taken by "Desacato", written by songwriting duo Antônio Carlos & Jocáfi. In third place was "Dia de Verão" by Eumir Deodato.

Elis Regina, despite her trouble with the law after the earlier performance with Tornado, served as the president of the international jury. Mexico won with "Y Después del Amor", written by Arturo Castro, who performed it with Los Hermanos Castro. Pakistan came in second with "Love Is On My Mind", written and performed by Rocky Shahan, the former bassist of The Konrads. Once again, Brazil placed third.

=== 1972 ===
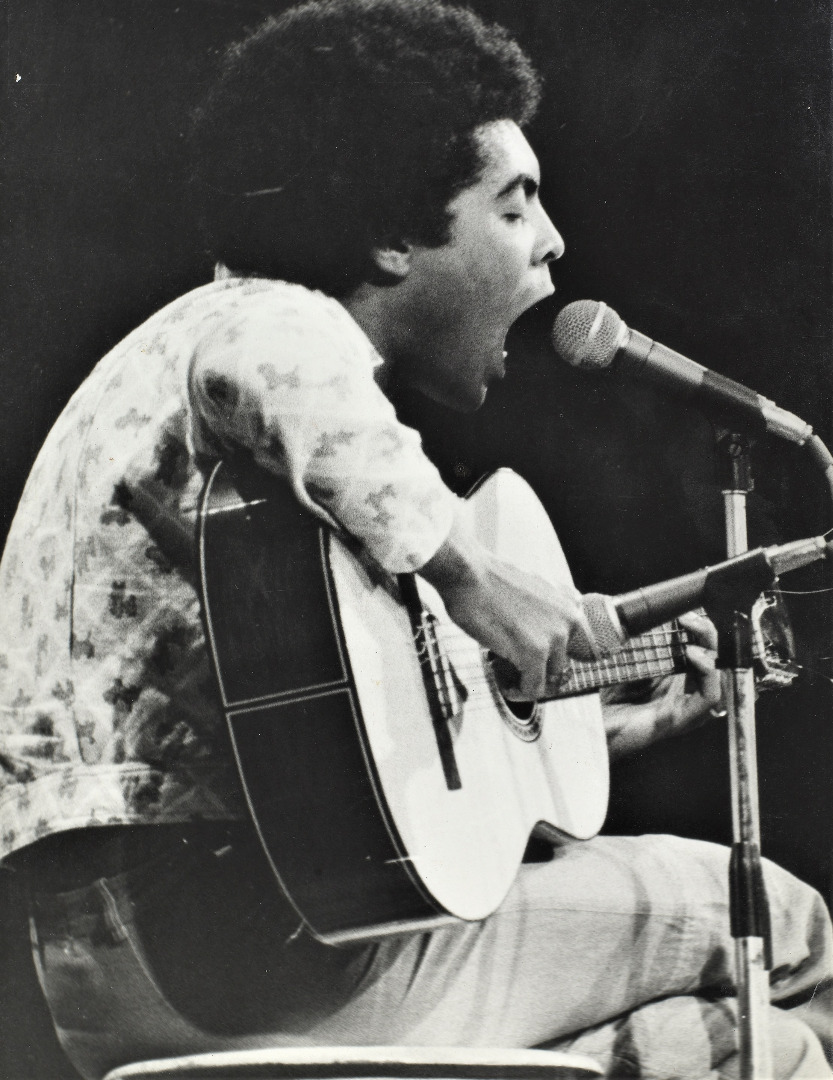
Gilberto Gil during the festival in 1972

The seventh and final festival was the first to be held without the involvement of Marzagão. He had taken a job in Mexico to serve as the vice president of Televisa. In his place were Solano Ribeiro, a producer who had worked with TV Excelsior and TV Record for their festivals in São Paulo, and José Otávio de Castro Neves. A new trophy was also created, designed by jeweler Caio Mourão. However, as a cost-cutting measure, the festival was abbreviated. Only thirty songs were accepted to compete in the national phase, and only fourteen countries were invited to compete alongside Brazil in the international phase. Since Ribeiro wanted a larger focus on Brazilian music, there would be two winners for the national phase. In addition, the winner of the popular jury for the international phase would also be given the Golden Rooster Award.

The government continued to become increasingly strict with its censorship, at one point dismissing the entire national jury and replacing it with foreigners. Lee Zhito (editor-in-chief of Billboard) ended up serving as the chairman for both juries. The reason given at the time was that it would help bring an international perspective to the competition and keep things fair. In actuality, it was because Nara Leão, the prior chairperson, had made critical remarks towards the government.

This festival featured guest performances by Gilberto Gil and Mungo Jerry. Gil had returned from his exile in London before the festival, and this was one of his first live performances back in Brazil. This festival also marked one of the earliest performances of Raul Seixas on the national stage. His entry, "Let me Sing, Let me Sing", was inspired by Elvis Presley and featured Seixas imitating the American singer in both mannerisms and clothing. It was later released as his first single. His success at the festival led to a deal with Philips Records and the subsequent release of his first solo album.

The two winners of the national phase were "Fio Maravilha", a song composed about the football player by Jorge Ben and performed by Maria Alcina, and "Diálogo", written by Paulo César Pinheiro and Baden Powell, who performed it alongside the duo Cláudia Regina & Tobias.

A tie-breaking vote decided the winner of the international phase. The United States won with "Nobody Calls me Prophet", written and performed by David Clayton-Thomas and William Smith as part of the Sanctuary Band. There were some boos directed towards Zhito, who cast the deciding vote, as some felt he gave preference to his own nationality. Close behind was Spain with "Mi Tierra", written by Augusto Algueró and performed by Nino Bravo. In third place was Greece with "Velvet Mornings", written by Alec Costandinos and Stélios Vlavianós. This song became a hit after being released as a single by original performer Demis Roussos. Despite not medaling, Italy won the popular vote, represented with "Aeternum" by Formula Tre. For the first time, Brazil did not medal.

== Dissolution ==
Because of government censorship targeting música popular brasileira and tropicália, under the provisions of AI-5, many musicians no longer felt safe performing. Some of the most prominent Brazilian musicians had, at some point, been arrested or forced into exile due to some sort of involvement with the festival. This group included Tony Tornado, Vinicius de Moraes, Antônio Carlos Jobim, Gilberto Gil, Chico Buarque, Geraldo Vandré, Erlon Chaves, and Caetano Veloso, as all previously discussed. From an economic standpoint, the festival had also been declining in popularity, both in ticket sales and television ratings. It was no longer profitable to run, and Globo announced in May the following year that there would be no more festivals.

== Winners ==
=== National ===
Winners of the National Phase
Year	Ed.	Song	Songwriter(s)	Performer(s)
1966	I	"Saveiros"	Dori Caymmi and Nelson Motta	Nana Caymmi
1967	II	"Margarida"	Guttemberg Guarabyra	Guttemberg Guarabyra and Grupo Manifesto
1968	III	"Sabiá"	Antônio Carlos Jobim and Chico Buarque	Cynara and Cybele
1969	IV	"Cantiga por Luciana"	Edmundo Souto and Paulinho Tapajós	Evinha
1970	V	"BR-3"	Antonio Adolfo and Tibério Gaspar	Tony Tornado and Trio Ternura
1971	VI	"Kyrie"	Paulinho Soares and Marcelo Silva	Trio Ternura
1972	VII	"Fio Maravilha"	Jorge Ben	Maria Alcina
1972	VII	"Diálogo"	Baden Powell and Paulo César Pinheiro	Baden Powell and Claudia Regina & Tobias

=== International ===
Winners of the International Phase
Year	Ed.	Country	Song	Songwriter(s)	Performer(s)
1966	I	Germany	"Frag Den Wind"	Helmut Zacharias and Carl J. Schauber	Inge Brück
1967	II	Italy	"Per una Donna"	Marcello di Martino, Giulio Perreta, and Corrado Mantoni	Jimmy Fontana
1968	III	Brazil	"Sabiá"	Antônio Carlos Jobim and Chico Buarque	Cynara and Cybele
1969	IV	Brazil	"Cantiga por Luciana"	Edmundo Souto and Paulinho Tapajós	Evinha
1970	V	Argentina	"Pedro Nadie"	Piero and José Tcherkaski	Piero
1971	VI	Mexico	"Y Después del Amor"	Arturo Castro	Los Hermanos Castro
1972	VII	United States	"Nobody Calls me Prophet"	David Clayton-Thomas and William Smith	David Clayton-Thomas and the Sanctuary Band
1972	VII	Italy	"Aeternum"	Alberto Radius, Gabriele Lorenzi, and Tony Cicco	Formula Tre
