= List of songs about Rio de Janeiro =

This is a list of songs about Rio de Janeiro, the second largest city in Brazil, or which mention the name of the city in the title or lyrics.

== Song listings ==
- "Rio" by the Doobie Brothers Taking it to the Streets
- "A Day in Rio" by Les Baxter
- "A Night in Rio" by Fourplay
- "A Rainy Night in Rio" (from the 1946 film The Time, the Place and the Girl)
- "A Rendezvous In Rio" by Xavier Cugat And His Waldorf-Astoria Orchestra
- "Addio in Rio" by Svend Asmussen & Dieter Reith
- "Ah, Rio" by Ron Carter
- "As Caravanas" by Chico Buarque
- "An der Copacabana" by Erste Allgemeine Verunsicherung
- "Aquele Abraço" by Gilberto Gil
- "Afternoon in Ipanema" by Marcos Ariel with Justo Almario
- "Androids In Rio" by Christopher Just (there is an entry for him on German wiki)
- "Aquarela Carioca" by Paulo Steinberg
- "Assim Como o Rio ..." from musical Estudantes
- "Autumn in Rio" by Nelson Riddle
- "Avenida Central" by Romero Lubambo
- "Avenida Rio Branco" by Azymuth
- "Ay Ay Ay Ay Moosey" by Modern Romance
- "Balanço Carioca" (from the animated film Rio)
- "Barra da Tijuca (Tijuca Bay)" by John Patitucci
- "Beautiful Lover" by Brotherhood of Man
- "Bedtime for Rio" by Yargo
- "Berimbau Carioca" by Laurindo Almeida
- "Biaozinho Carioca" by Azymuth
- "The Big Brass Band from Brazil" by Art Mooney & His Orchestra
- "Botafogo (dedicated to Oswald Guerra)" by Darius Milhaud
- "Cabana Carioca" by Spyro Gyra
- "Caboclo do Rio" by Nat King Cole
- "Carioca" by Blue Rondo à la Turk
- "Carioca" by Chico Buarque
- "Carioca" by Choker Campbell
- "Carioca" (from the musical film Flying Down to Rio)
- "Carioca" by Guido & Maurizio de Angelis
- "Carioca" by Paulinho da Costa
- "Carioca Blue" by Jimmy Bruno & Joe Beck
- "Carioca Fun" by Miecio Askanasy's Braziliana
- "Carioca Hills" by Bud Shank
- "Cariocas" by Adriana Calcanhotto
- "Carnaval in Rio (Carnaval No Rio)" by Djavan
- "Carnevale A Rio" by Umberto Bindi
- "Carnival in Rio (Punk Was)" by Die Toten Hosen
- "Cats of Rio" by Dave Grusin & Lee Ritenour
- "Christmas in Rio" by Stanley Clarke
- "Christmas in Rio" by Tony Martin
- "Cidade Maravilhosa" by André Filho (1935)
- "Coisa da Rio" by Jeff Gardner & Gary Peacock
- "Copa Beach" by Luiz Bonfa & Eumir Deodato
- "Copacabana" by Ary Barroso
- "Copacabana" by The Chakachas
- "Copacabana" by Edmundo Ros
- "Copacabana" by Herbie Mann
- "Copacabana" by Barry Manilow
- "Copacabana" by John Klemmer
- "Copacabana" by Martha and the Muffins
- "Copacabana" by Sailor
- "Copacabana" by Two Man Sound
- "Copacabana (dedicated to Godofredo Leão Velloso)" by Darius Milhaud
- "Copacabana Dreams" by Sérgio Mendes
- "Copacabana Girl" by Les Reed
- "Copacabana, Ipanema, Leblon" by Willie Colón
- "Copacabana Midnight" by Luiz Bonfá
- "Copacabana Night" by Barry Mason
- "Copacabana Ripple" by Freddy Cole
- "Copacabana Samba" by Joseph Francis Kuhn
- "Corcovado" by Antônio Carlos Jobim
- "Corcovado (dedicated to Madame Henri Hoppenot)" by Darius Milhaud
- "De Janeiro" by R.I.O.
- "Dio in Rio" by JBO
- "Do Leme ao Pontal" by Tim Maia
- "Down to Rio" by Gregg Rolie
- "Dreams of Rio" by Akira Jimbo
- "Ela é Carioca" by Carol Saboya
- "Feitio de Oração" by Noel Rosa
- "Fever in Rio" by Ray Materick
- "Flying Down to Rio", theme song from the Fred Astaire/Ginger Rogers film of the same name
- "Flying Down to Rio" by Drugstore
- "Flying Down to Rio" by Sutherland Brothers and Quiver
- "From Rio with Love" by Jakatta (pseudonym of Dave Lee (DJ))
- "Funk Me Down to Rio" by RAH Band
- "Gavea (dedicated to Madame Henrique Oswald)" by Darius Milhaud
- "The Girl from Ipanema" by Antônio Carlos Jobim
- "Girl from Ipanema Goes to Greenland" by The B-52's
- "Girl from Rio" by Anitta
- "Goin' Down to Rio" by Jeff Lynne
- "Goodbye Ipanema" by Lee Konitz
- "Guanabara Bay" by BZN
- "Guaratiba" by Azymuth
- "Gypsy in Rio" by Jean Jacques Perrey
- "Hello Rio!" by Ottawan
- "Hit 'Em Up" by 2Pac
- "I Go to Rio" by Peter Allen, Pablo Cruise
- "I'm Going to Rio" by Paulinho da Costa
- "In Copacabana" by Blue Barron and his Orchestra
- "In Rio de Janeiro" by Mireille Mathieu
- "Incident in Rio" by Skeewiff
- "Ipanema (dedicated to Arthur Rubinstein)" by Darius Milhaud
- "Ipanema Amour" by Mad Professor
- "Ipanema 2000" by Richard Bone
- "Ipanema Lady" by George Duke
- "Ipanema Sol" by Lee Ritenour
- "Ipanema Walk" by Ronnie Foster
- "It's All About The Benjamins" by Puff Daddy & The Family
- "Janeiro" by Mystic Diversions (featuring Mike Francis)
- "Janeiro" by Solid Sessions
- "Je Rêve à Rio" by Robert Charlebois
- "Je vais à Rio" by Claude François
- "Jesus of Rio" by Crosby & Nash
- "Jesus of Rio" by Violent Femmes
- "Knee Deep in Rio" by Maynard Ferguson
- "La Rua Madureira" by Nino Ferrer
- "Laranjeiras (dedicated to Audrey Parr)" by Darius Milhaud
- "Last Summer in Rio" by Azymuth
- "Leblon" by Romero Lubambo
- "Leme (dedicated to Nininha Velloso-Guerra)" by Darius Milhaud
- "Les Cariocas, Elles Sont Si Belles Les Cariocas" by Sacha Distel
- "Les Rues de Rio" by Caravelli
- "L'incendie de Rio" by Sacha Distel
- "The Lights of Rio" by Johnny Mathis
- "Luá Joá (Moon in Joá)" by Sebastião Tapajós & Zimbo Trio
- "Lunada en Rio" by Luiz Bonfa
- "Luzes do Rio" by Luiz Bonfa
- "Maracana" by Azymuth
- "Maxixe Carioca - Samba" by Roberto Inglez
- "Menino do Rio" by Caetano Veloso
- "Me Rio de Janeiro" by Mecano
- "Me, Myself & Rio" by Doc Powell
- "Meu Lugar" by Arlindo Cruz
- "Meu Rio de Janeiro" Salgueiro
- "Moonlight in Rio" by Luiz Bonfá
- "Morning In" by Earl Klugh
- "Morning in Rio" by Earl Klugh
- "Mourir a Rio" by Claude Morgan (member of Bimbo Jet)
- "My Friend from Rio" by Greg Abate Quintet featuring Richie Cole
- "My Own Way" (Night Mix) by Duran Duran
- "Nancy's Goin' to Rio" (from the musical comedy Nancy Goes to Rio)
- "Next Summer in Rio" by Azymuth
- "New York - Rio - Tokyo" by Trio Rio
- "Ob in Bombay, Ob in Rio" by Mary Roos
- "Oh Rio" by Cuban Soldiers
- "One Night in Rio" by Albert West
- "Only a Dream in Rio" by James Taylor
- "O Nome da Cidade" by Adriana Calcanhotto
- "Out from Rio" by Vernon Dalhart
- "Over Rio" by Quantum Jump
- "Pao de Assucar (Sugar Loaf)" by Shorty Rogers
- "Paris Pas Rio" by Evinha (member of Trio Esperança)
- "Parque do Flamengo (Flamingo Park)" by Paul Horn
- "Parque Laje (A Park in Rio)" by Paul Horn
- "Passeio Ho Rio (Walk in Rio)" by Luis Bonfá
- "Pe do Samba" by Mart'nália
- "The People of Rio" by Lincoln Mayorga
- "Piano na Mangueira" by Paula Morelenbaum
- "Pieces of Ipanema" by Azymuth
- "Ponte Entre Rio E Paris" by Evinha (member of Trio Esperança)
- "Praia do Flamengo" by Passport (band)
- "Pregões Cariocas" (originally known as "Cena Carioca") by Braguinha
- "Primavera no Rio" by Carmen Miranda and Heriberto Muraro
- "Prisoner of Rio" by Ronnie B
- "Quiet Nights of Quiet Stars (Corcovado)" by Cannonball Adderley
- "Radio Rio" by Masayoshi Takanaka
- "Rancho do Carioca" by Oscar Castro-Neves
- "Real in Rio" by Sérgio Mendes
- "Rendezvous in Rio" by Michael Franks
- "Rendezvous in Rio" by Philip Green
- "Rhapsody in Rio" by Marcos Ariel with Justo Almario
- "R.I.O" by R.I.O.
- "Riding To Rio" by William Orbit
- "Rio" by Affinity
- "Rio" by Edmundo Ros
- "Rio" by Gerard Joling
- "Rio" by Hubert Giraud
- "Rio" by Lee Morgan
- "Rio" by Leonard Feather
- "Rio" by Les Baxter
- "Rio" by Paul Winter Luiz Bonfá Roberto Menescal Luiz Eça
- "Rio" by Maywood
- "Rio" by McCoy Tyner
- "Rio" by Michael Nesmith
- "Rio" by Netsky
- "Rio" by Private Line
- "Rio" by Raul de Souza
- "Rio" by Sylvia Telles
- "Rio" by Victor Feldman
- "Rio" by Victor Silvester
- "Rio" from Welcome to the Club (musical)
- "Rio.com" by Alex Bugnon
- "The Rio Convoy" by Bob Rowe's O.M.O.
- "Rio 40 Graus" by Fernanda Abreu
- "Rio Acima" by Luiz Bonfa
- "Rio After Dark" by Lalo Schifrin
- "Rio and Me (Eu E o Rio)" by Walter Wanderley
- "Rio Antigo" by Los Indios Tabajaras
- "Rio Batucada" by George Cates
- "Rio Bonito (Beautiful Rio)" by Laurindo Almeida and the Bossa Nova All Stars
- "Rio Brasil" by Edmundo Ros
- "The Rio Connection" by Steve Hackett
- "Rio Dawning" by Oscar Castro-Neves
- "Rio de Janeiro" by Afric Simone
- "Rio de Janeiro" by Ary Barroso
- "Rio de Janeiro" by Barry White
- "Rio de Janeiro" by Bill Wyman
- "Rio de Janeiro" by Edmundo Ros
- "Rio de Janeiro" by Irving Fields Trio
- "Rio de Janeiro" by Patricia Paay
- "Rio de Janeiro" by Sérgio Mendes
- "Rio de Janeiro" by Tele
- "Rio de Janeiro" (from Time Out for Rhythm)
- "Rio de Janeiro" by Ugly Duckling
- "Rio de Janeiro Blue" by Richard Torrance & John Haeny (1977)
- "Rio de Janeiro Blue" by Freddy Cole
- "Rio de Janeiro Underground" by Romero Lubambo
- "Rio de Janvier" by Gold
- "Rio do Brasil" by Dalida
- "Rio Dreamin'" by Johnny "Guitar" Watson
- "Rio Drive" by Gregg Karukas
- "Rio (Eu Te Quero Mais)" by Dizzy Man's Band
- "Rio et Venise" by Nicole Croisille
- "Rio Favela" by Mad Professor
- "Rio from the Air" by Vince Guaraldi
- "Rio Funk" by Lee Ritenour
- "Rio Girl" by Timmy Thomas
- "Rio Greyhound" by Stan Ridgway
- "Rio Jam" by Passport
- "Río-Líze" by Vital Information
- "Rio Loco" by Raul de Souza
- "Rio Manhattan" by Hidehiko Matsumoto
- "Rio Nights" by Moulin Rouge Orchestra (featuring Ben Selvin)
- "Rio Nights" by Shakatak
- "Rio Non Stop" by André Gagnon
- "Rio One" by Gerry Mulligan
- "Rio Party Nights" by Stevie B
- "Rio Reggae" by Michel Pagliaro
- "Rio Rhapsody" by Bud Shank
- "Rio Rio" by Lu Colombo
- "Rio Rocks" by Sigue Sigue Sputnik
- "Rio Romance' by Sam Most
- "Rio Rush" by Fourplay
- "Rio Samba" by Joachim Heider & Michael Holm
- "Rio Samba" by John Brimhall
- "Rio Samba" by Larry Carlton
- "Rio Sangre" by Deodato
- "Rio Sol" by Lee Ritenour
- "Rio Sunrise" by Jim Horn
- "Rio Tropico" by Tim Weisberg
- "Rio with Love" by Luiz Bonfá
- "Rock & Rio" by Focus
- "Roll Down to Rio" by Peter Bellamy
- "Rolling Down To Rio" from Just So Songs
- "Romantic Rio" by Les Baxter
- "Roses of Rio" by The Four Aces
- "Sabado em Copacabana" by Zelia Duncan
- "Salva o Rio" by Raul de Souza
- "Samba de Janeiro" by Bellini
- "Samba de Orly" (from the animated film Rio)
- "Samba del Rio" by Craig Chaquico
- "Samba do Avião" by Tom Jobim
- "Samba do Carioca" by Elza Soares
- "Samba do Rio" by Tom Jobim
- "Sambamé Rio" by Foxy
- "Saturday in Rio" by Luiz Bonfa & Eumir Deodato
- "See You in Rio" by Elephant's Memory
- "Sex Bomb Boogie" by Sigue Sigue Sputnik
- "She Is Carioca" by Tom Jobim
- "Si Tu Vas À Rio" by Dario Moreno
- "Slow Boat to Rio" by Earl Klugh
- "Som do Rio (The Sound of Rio)" by Paul Horn
- "Son of Rio" by Depth Charge (an alias of Jonathan Saul Kane)
- "Sound of Leblon Beach" by Lizzy Mercier Descloux
- "Souvenir from Rio" by Space
- "Spanish Eyes" by Ricky Martin
- "The Star of Rio" ("Stern von Rio", from the film The Star of Rio)
- "Stars Over Rio" by Victor Silvester
- "Streets of Rio" by Elements
- "Sugar Loaf" by Art Mooney
- "Sugar Loaf" by Dick Hyman
- "Sugarloaf" by Herb Alpert
- "Sugar Loaf" by Luiz Bonfá
- "Sugarloaf at Twilight" by Ahmad Jamal
- "Sugarloaf Express" by Lee Ritenour
- "Sugar Loaf Mountain" by George Duke
- "Sugar Loaf Mountain Rag" by John Sheahan & Michael Howard
- "Sugar Loaf Samba" by Stanley Black<--this is an orchestrated, piano-based Samba that has no words -->
- "Sugar Loaf Sunrise" by Wade Marcus
- "Suiça Carioca" by Azymuth
- "Summer Nights in Rio" by Wilton Felder
- "Swingin' Down To Rio" by Charlie Barnet
- "Take You to Rio", by Justin Bieber, from the animated film Rio
- "Tango del Rio" by Thierry Lang
- "That's the Way the Money Goes" by M (band)
- "Theme of Rio" by Salomé de Bahia
- "They Met in Rio" by Edmundo Ros
- "Tijuca (dedicated to Ricardo Viñes)" by Darius Milhaud
- "Twilight in Rio" by Victor Silvester
- "Two Tickets for Rio" by Gruppo Sportivo
- "Un Américain Dans les Rues de Rio" by Franck Fernandel
- "Un Poco Rio (Little Rio)" by Joe Harnell
- "Up from the Sea It Arose and Ate Rio in One Swift Bite" by George Duke
- "Valsa Carioca" (from the animated film Rio)
- "Valsa de uma Cidade" by Teresa Salgueiro
- "Venceremos - We Will Win" by Working Week
- "Vida Gal" by Daniela Mercury
- "Virginia Plain" by Roxy Music
- "Viva o Rio" by Raul de Souza
- "What Do They Do On A Rainy Night In Rio?" by Tony Pastor
- "Suburbio" by Chico Buarque

== See also ==
- List of songs about cities
