= Bruno Fagundes =

Brazilian actor (born 1989)

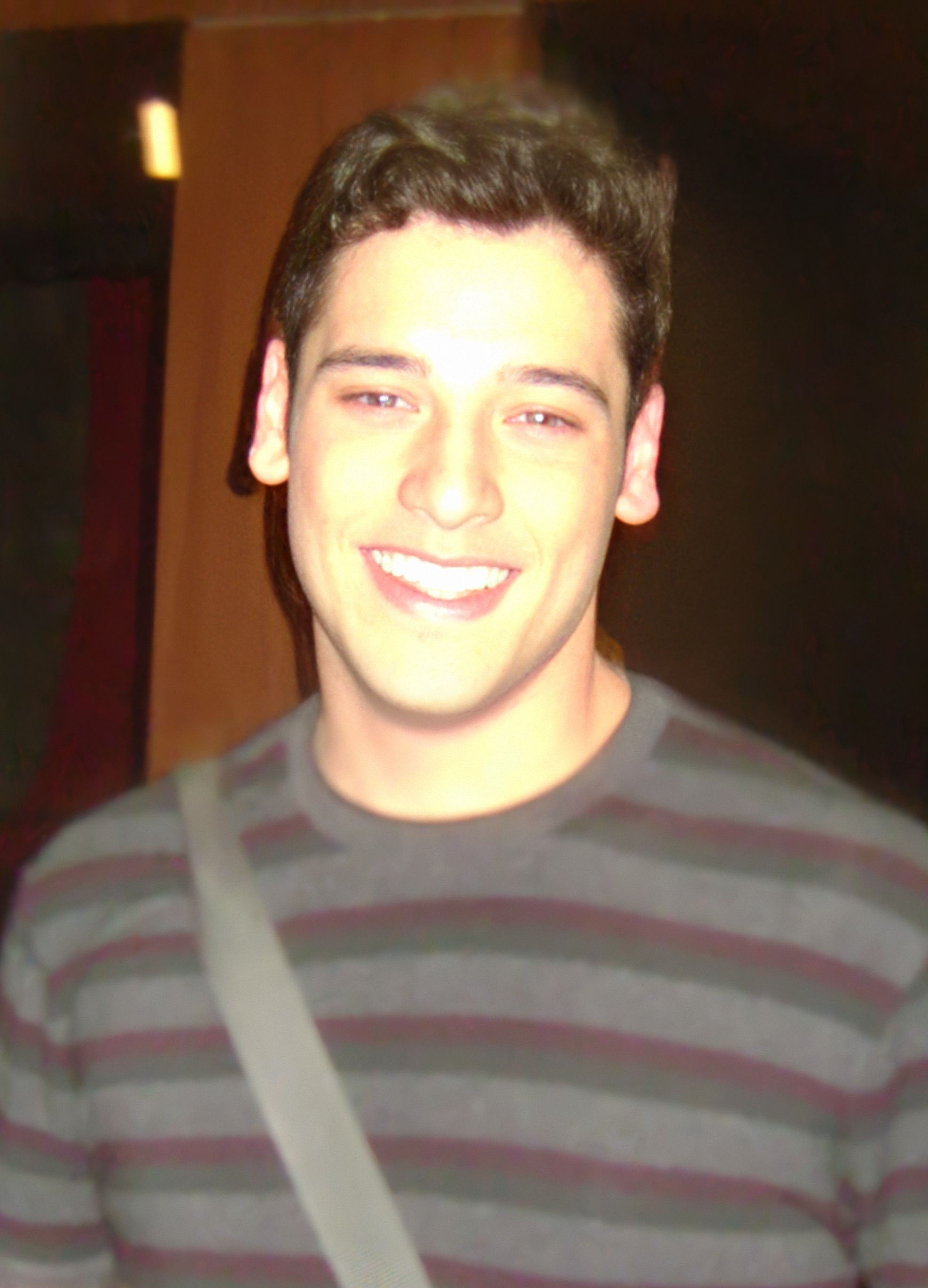
- Fagundes in July 2012
- Born: Bruno Carvalho Fagundes; 24 May 1989 (age 36); São Paulo, Brazil
- Occupation: Actor
- Years active: 1994–present
- Father: Antônio Fagundes
- Website: brunofagundesoficial.com

Bruno Carvalho Fagundes (born 24 May 1989) is a Brazilian actor.

== Career ==
Fagundes graduated from the Incenna theatre school. His television appearances include Negócio da China (2008), Gluom – Piloto (2006), Carga Pesada (2006), O Rei do Gado (1996) and A Viagem (1994). On stage, he has appeared in Os Tagarelas (2004), Viúva, Porém Honesta (2004), Procura-se uma Rosa (2005), Sonho de uma Noite de Verão (2005), Pã (2005), Gente que Faz (2006, in which he performed with his mother, Mara Carvalho), A Lua sobre o Tapete (2007). He has also appeared in films such as Fim da Linha (2005), Bellini and the Devil (2006), Quem Sabe (2007) and Chico Talarico: O Documentário (2008).

In 2011, Fagundes also decided to sing and performed in São Paulo at the show Improvável. In 2012, he joined his father, Antônio Fagundes, in the play Vermelho in São Paulo. The montage features a panorama of Russian expatriate painter Mark Rothko (1903–1970) in the United States, played by his father. This one is in crisis with the new times, dominated by people of a different generation and values different from his, represented by the young painter Ken, Bruno's role.

In 2014, he was in the reboot of Rede Globo, Meu Pedacinho de Chão, with the authorship of Benedito Ruy Barbosa.

== Personal life ==
Fagundes was born in São Paulo, Brazil. He is the son of actor and director Antônio Fagundes and actress, director and writer Mara Carvalho.

He has been dating fellow actor Igor Fernandez since 2022, who met during the recording of the telenovela Cara e Coragem.

== Filmography ==
=== Television ===
Novels, Series and Minisseries
Year	Title	Role
1994	A Viagem	Dudu's friend
1996	O Rei do Gado	
2006	Carga Pesada	Jorge
2008	Negócio da China	
2014	Meu Pedacinho de Chão	Renato
2017	Sense8	Cameo
2016–2020	3%	Andre Santana
2022	Cara e Coragem	Renan Garcia Lopes
2022	Só Se For Por Amor	Rafael

=== Film ===
Long & Short films
Year	Title	Role	Notes
2005	Fim de Linha	Daniel	De Gustavo Steinberg
2006	Bellini and the Devil	–	of Marcelo Galvão
2007	Quem Sabe	–	of Márcio Mehiel
2008	Chico Talarico – O Documentário	–	of Bruno Azevedo

== Stage ==
Shows
Year	Play	Notes
2004	Os Tagarelas	Free adaptation of texts of Machiavelli, Shakespeare and Mololière. Directed by Ayrton Dupin.
2004	Viúva, Porém Honesta	Of Nelson Rodrigues. Direction: Magali Biff
2005	Pã	Direction:: Mara Carvalho
2005	Procura-se Uma Rosa	Of Vinícius de Moraes. Direção de Aline Ferraz
2005	Sonho de Uma Noite de Verão	Of William Shakespeare. Direction: André Grecco
2006	Gente que Faz	Text of Mara Carvalho; Direction: André Grecco and Mara Carvalho
2007	A Lua Sobre o Tapete	Text e direction of Olayr Coan
2008	Efemérides	Direction of Aline Ferraz
2008	Restos	Bruno Fagundes: Production assistant. Direction: Marcio Aurélio
2011	Show Improvável	Musical
2012–2013	Vermelho	Direction: Jorge Takla
2013	Tribos	Production of TUCA (PUC theater). Direction: Ulysses Cruz.
