= TUCA =

TUCA may refer to:

- Teatro da Pontifícia Universidade Católica de São Paulo, a theatre in São Paulo abbreviated as TUCA
- Trade Union Confederation of the Americas, a regional trade union federation, also abbreviated as TUCA-CSA

== See also ==
- Tuca (disambiguation)
