= A Mulher sem Pecado =

Play written by Nelson Rodrigues

- Original language: Portuguese
- Written by: Nelson Rodrigues
- Characters: Olegário; Inézia; D. Aninha; Umberto; Inner Voice; Lídia; Joel; Maurício; D. Márcia; Girl; Woman

Premiere
- Date: December 9, 1942

A Mulher sem Pecado was the first play written by Nelson Rodrigues. The play falls under the category of psychological dramas, alongside, for example, Vestido de Noiva, one of the playwright's masterpieces. The play premiered on December 9, 1942, at the Teatro Carlos Gomes in Rio de Janeiro, Brazil.

== Plot ==
"The plot focuses on the neurosis of Olegário, a businessman confined to a wheelchair who turns jealousy into an exercise in psychological torture. His physical condition becomes an obsession with controlling the soul and, above all, the thoughts of his young wife, Lídia. The protagonist spies on her through the servants – the chauffeur Umberto and the maid Inézia – turning the home into a claustrophobic stage for his own delirium, which oscillates between the real and the imaginary." The entire unfolding of the plot takes place in the living room of Olegário's house.

== Analysis ==
Claudiomar Pedro da Silva and Agnaldo Rodrigues da Silva analyzed that Nelson Rodrigues' inaugural play, A Mulher sem Pecado, written in 1941 and premiered in 1942, presents a fictional world full of meanings that reveal human fragility in the face of our ghosts and fears. The analysis highlights that Nelson Rodrigues conceives the world through the ambiguities of modern man, with Olegário being the ultimate representation of this obsession—a businessman who feigns paralysis to test the fidelity of his wife Lídia, turning their home into a stage for his own delirium. The researchers point out the irony of the title, as there is no woman without sin in the plot; Lídia, the oppressed wife tired of morbid suspicion, ends up transgressing by fleeing with the chauffeur Umberto, materializing her desire for freedom. The central conflict, driven by the characters' actions in a single setting, demonstrates how Olegário's obsessive jealousy, his attempt to control even his wife's thoughts, and his imposition of limits between wife and mistress create the environment for his own downfall. Finally, Silva and Silva conclude that the play ends tragically: at the very moment Olegário is certain of Lídia's fidelity, she betrays him, and the protagonist, facing the catastrophe of his world, stages his own suicide, symbolizing the destruction caused by his obsession.

Eduardo Nunomura, on the Farofafá website, observed that "this neurosis of Olegário is the seed that, as we can see, would flourish in the delirium of Alaíde (Vestido de Noiva), the character who takes refuge in madness and hallucination to escape her condition," and that the toxic relationship between Olegário and Lídia forces the wife to "confront a moral precipice." He also states, "It is symptomatic to see that Lídia frees herself, but leaves for another prison. In other words, if Olegário is punished, Lídia, in fact, does not free herself completely. She merely exchanges the neurosis of chastity for the violence of desire."
