= Meu Pedacinho de Chão =

Brazilian telenovela directed by Luiz Fernando Carvalho

- Also known as: My Little Piece of Ground
- Genre: Telenovela; Romance; Fantasy
- Created by: Benedito Ruy Barbosa
- Written by: Benedito Ruy Barbosa; Edilene Barbosa; Marcos Barbosa de Bernardo
- Directed by: Luiz Fernando Carvalho
- Starring: Bruna Linzmeyer; Irandhir Santos; Johnny Massaro; Osmar Prado; Antônio Fagundes; Rodrigo Lombardi; Bruno Fagundes; Juliana Paes; Emiliano Queiroz; Geytsa Garcia; Tomás Sampaio see more
- Country of origin: Brazil
- Original language: Portuguese
- No. of episodes: 96

Production
- Running time: 19–43 minutes

Original release
- Network: TV Globo
- Release: 7 April – 1 August 2014

Related
- Meu Pedacinho de Chão (1971)

Meu Pedacinho de Chão (English: My Little Piece of Ground) is a Brazilian telenovela written by Benedito Ruy Barbosa and directed by Luiz Fernando Carvalho and produced and broadcast by TV Globo. It aired from April 7 to August 1, 2014. It is based on the 1971 telenovela of the same name also created by Benedito Ruy Barbosa.

It starred Bruna Linzmeyer, Irandhir Santos, Johnny Massaro, Bruno Fagundes, Rodrigo Lombardi, Juliana Paes, Osmar Prado, Antônio Fagundes, Geytsa Garcia and Tomás Sampaio.

== Cast ==
Actor/Actress	Character
Bruna Linzmeyer	Juliana
Irandhir Santos	Zelão
Johnny Massaro	Ferdinando Napoleão
Osmar Prado	Epaminondas Napoleão
Rodrigo Lombardi	Pedro Falcão
Antônio Fagundes	Giácomo
Bruno Fagundes	Dr. Renato
Juliana Paes	Catarina Napoleão
Emiliano Queiroz	Father Santo
Cíntia Dicker	Milita
Geytsa Garcia	Pituca
Tomás Sampaio	Serelepe
Gabriel Sater	Viramundo
Inês Peixoto	Tê
Flávio Bauraqui	Rodapé
Kauê Ribeiro	Tuim
Letícia Almeida	Rosinha
Dani Ornellas	Amância
Paula Barbosa	Gina
Teuda Bara	Benta
Raul Barretto	Izidoro
Alice Coelho	Lurdes
Alex Brasil	Jonas
Fernando Sampaio	Marimbondo
