= Tuca =

Tuca is the nickname of:

- Ricardo Ferretti (born 1954), also known as Tuca, Brazilian-Mexican football manager and former player
- Tuca (footballer) or Juliano Francisco de Paula (born 1981), Brazilian football defender
- Tuca (musician) or Valeniza Zagni da Silva (1944–1978), Brazilian guitarist, songwriter, and singer
- Benjamín "Tuca" Pardo, fictional character in the 2012 Argentine telenovela Graduados

== See also ==
- TUCA (disambiguation)
