= Cintia Dicker =

Brazilian model and actress

- Born: Cintia Schneider Dick; 6 December 1986 (age 39); Campo Bom, Rio Grande do Sul, Brazil
- Occupations: Model, actress
- Modeling information
- Height: 1.78 m (5 ft 10 in)
- Hair color: Red
- Eye color: Blue
- Agency: Women Management (New York); Storm Management (London); Public Image Management (Montreal); Munich Models (Munich); Satoru Japan Inc. (Tokyo)

Cintia Schneider Dick (born 6 December 1986), known as Cintia Dicker, is a Brazilian model and actress.

== Career ==
She has appeared in advertisements for Ann Taylor, Macy's, L'Oréal, American Eagle Outfitters, Tom Ford, Wildfox Couture, and Yves Saint Laurent, and in catalogs for Victoria's Secret, H&M, Gap, bebe stores, and Lands' End. She has been on the covers of French Marie Claire, Elle, Madame Figaro and Brazilian Vogue/Teen Vogue, and was featured in the Sports Illustrated Swimsuit Edition in 2009, 2010, 2011, 2012 and 2013. Dicker has walked fashion shows including Gucci, Anna Sui, Peter Som, Matthew Williamson, Tommy Hilfiger, DSquared², Lanvin, and Dolce & Gabbana.

Her career modeling and acting for Sports Illustrated and other high paying clients has allowed her to support children's charities in Brazil and she also hopes it will allow her to start her own businesses in the future. She is ranked as one of the "Top Sexiest" models in the industry.

She has described herself as spiritualist. In 2014, she was given the role of Milita in the Brazilian telenovela Meu Pedacinho de Chão.

In 2015, she performed in the 100 Years of Beauty series of the WatchCut Video YouTube Channel, representing her home country Brazil.

== Filmography ==
=== Television ===
Year	Title	Role
2005	Belíssima	Model
2013	Correio Feminino	Teenager
2014	Meu Pedacinho de Chão	Milita
2016	Totalmente Demais	Herself
2017	Pega Pega	Ulla
