= Piero (Argentine singer) =

Argentine singer (1945–2026)

Piero De Benedictis
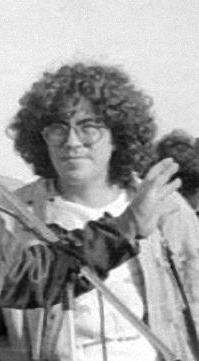
- Piero with Alejandro Mayol in the 1970s
- Born: Piero Antonio Franco De Benedictis; 19 April 1945; Gallipoli, Apulia, Italy
- Died: 7 October 2026 (aged 81); Buenos Aires, Argentina
- Citizenship: Argentina; Colombia
- Occupations: Singer; songwriter; actor
- Years active: 1964–2022
- Website: www.pieroonline.com

Piero Antonio Franco De Benedictis (19 April 1945 – 7 October 2026), known professionally as Piero, was an Italian-born Argentine singer and songwriter. Born in Gallipoli, Apulia, he moved with his family to Argentina at the age of three and began his professional career as a singer in 1964. He became widely known in Latin America for songs including "Mi viejo", "Pedro Nadie", and "Para el pueblo lo que es del pueblo", and became associated with protest song and socially conscious music during the 1970s.

Piero left Argentina following the 1976 Argentine coup d'état and spent several years in exile in Spain before returning in 1981. He subsequently developed a particularly close relationship with Colombia, where he received Colombian citizenship in 1994 and was recognized for his involvement in peace and humanitarian initiatives. He received the Latin Grammy Lifetime Achievement Award in 2016.

== Early life ==
Piero was born on 19 April 1945 in Gallipoli, in the Italian region of Apulia. His family emigrated to Argentina in 1948, when he was three years old. They initially settled in Banfield, in the southern part of Greater Buenos Aires, and moved in 1951 to Allen, Río Negro, where his father operated a business selling radios and record players. Piero completed his primary education in Allen and became interested in music there.

As a teenager, Piero studied at seminaries in Viedma and Villa Devoto with the intention of becoming a priest. His experiences in religious education exposed him to socially engaged Catholic figures, including Alejandro Mayol, and contributed to his later interest in socially conscious music.

In 1964, a recording Piero had made while at the seminary was sent to Canal 9, leading to his television debut on the musical program Remates musicales. He initially performed Italian-language melodic songs and subsequently appeared in Buenos Aires nightclubs alongside performers including Leo Dan, Palito Ortega, Lalo Fransen and Chico Novarro.

== Musical career ==
=== Early career and breakthrough ===
Piero recorded the singles "El cachivache" and "Rosa, Rosita" in 1964 and "La sombrilla" in 1965. He subsequently withdrew from performing for several years to study music and develop his songwriting. During this period he worked selling clerical collars to priests.

In 1968, Piero met writer and journalist José Tcherkaski, with whom he formed a songwriting partnership. Their collaboration produced several of Piero's best-known songs, including "Mi viejo". The song, with music by Piero and lyrics by Tcherkaski, was recorded in 1969 and became one of the defining songs of his career.

In 1969, Piero won first prize at the Third Buenos Aires Song Festival with "Cómo somos". The following year, he won the international competition at the Festival Internacional da Canção in Rio de Janeiro with "Pedro Nadie", becoming the first Argentine to win the international prize at the festival.

His music increasingly reflected social and political concerns. Albums such as Coplas de mi país (1972) and Para el pueblo lo que es del pueblo (1973) established him as a prominent figure in Argentine protest song. Songs including "Para el pueblo lo que es del pueblo", "Que se vayan ellos", "Los americanos" and "Las cosas que pasan" addressed political repression, social inequality and the political climate of Argentina.

Piero also began acting in films. In 1970 he appeared in El profesor patagónico, directed by Fernando Ayala, playing a young priest and performing several of his songs. He subsequently appeared in Heroína (1972) and other film projects.

=== Exile and return ===
During 1975 and 1976, Piero faced increasing restrictions and harassment because of his repertoire. He left Argentina after the 1976 military coup and went into exile in Spain. He lived for several years in the province of Guadalajara, including in the municipality of Utande, where he lived in a former mill and cultivated the land. During this period he largely withdrew from musical activity, although he continued working on material that later appeared on the album Y mi gente dónde va.

Piero returned to Argentina in 1981. His return was accompanied by his manager Pierre Bayona, and he formed the band Prema with several musicians with whom he had worked or become acquainted during his years abroad. He subsequently developed a closer relationship with Argentina's rock nacional scene, performing at Estadio Obras and the Teatro Ópera in Buenos Aires.

His post-exile recordings included Canto de la ternura (1982), Un hombre común (1983), Qué generosa sos, mi tierra (1984), El regalao (1985), Gaviota (1986) and Las galaxias nos miran (1986). He also wrote "Señora Violencia e Hijos", recorded by Pedro y Pablo on the album Contracrisis, addressing the Malvinas War and its consequences.

In the mid-1980s, Piero increasingly described his approach as "music of proposals" rather than protest music. He also became involved in ecological and social projects, including the development of educational agricultural initiatives for disadvantaged young people. He received the Konex Award Diploma of Merit as a ballad singer in 1985.

=== Later musical career ===
Piero continued recording and performing throughout the 1980s and 1990s. His albums included Tríptico - Volumen 1 (1988), Tríptico - Volumen 2 (1989), A pesar de los pesares (1989), Cachuso Rantifuso (1991), recorded with Marilina Ross and Juan Carlos Baglietto, Te quiero contar (1993), and Piero e Indra Devi (1993).

His children's music became an important part of his later work. Sinfonía inconclusa en la mar, originally released in 1975 and based largely on compositions by priest and songwriter Alejandro Mayol, became one of his best-known children's recordings. In 2011 it was nominated for the Latin Grammy Award for Best Latin Children's Album.

In 1995, Piero participated in a double-album project devoted to children's rights involving artists including David Gilmour, Annie Lennox, Joaquín Sabina, León Gieco, Jairo, Cristian Castro, Pedro Fernández, Baglietto, Miguel Cantilo and Diego Maradona. The project was associated with UNICEF.

He released Piero & Pablo en vivo desde Colombia, recorded with Cuban singer Pablo Milanés, in 1999. He subsequently released 30 años de canciones blindadas (2001), Todavía no hicimos lo mejor (2015), recorded during a tour in Chile, and América (2016).

In 2016, Piero received the Latin Grammy Lifetime Achievement Award from the Latin Recording Academy. The Academy cited his work as a singer-songwriter addressing social, economic and spiritual themes and noted that he had sold more than three million records.

In August 2022, he released a new version of "Manso y tranquilo" with the Argentine-Colombian band Che Sudaka.

Piero continued to perform into 2026. In April of that year, he appeared in Bogotá as part of a presentation of La sinfonía inconclusa del mar.

== Colombia ==
Piero developed a particularly close relationship with Colombia after his exile. He lived in Bogotá during the early 1980s and returned regularly to the country thereafter. He received Colombian citizenship in 1994 from President Ernesto Samper, after an earlier attempt to arrange his naturalization under President César Gaviria had been delayed.

He became involved in initiatives related to the Colombian conflict, including concerts and public activities promoting peace and reconciliation. During the peace process under President Andrés Pastrana Arango, he visited San Vicente del Caguán and performed there in support of the negotiations. He later participated in activities supporting victims of paramilitary violence and state crimes and remained publicly associated with peace initiatives in Colombia.

In 2013, Piero participated in the Centro Nacional de Memoria Histórica's Monumento Sonoro por la Memoria, a project involving children and adolescents from several Colombian regions affected by violence. The project brought the participants to Bogotá for a performance focused on memory and reconciliation.

In 2016, he publicly supported the Colombian peace process and met with representatives of the Colombian government and the FARC during negotiations in Havana. In 2023, the Chamber of Representatives of Colombia awarded him the Order of Democracy Simón Bolívar in recognition of his musical career and his work as a peace advocate in Colombia.

== Political activity in Argentina ==
In 1998, Governor Eduardo Duhalde appointed Piero as Undersecretary of Culture of the Province of Buenos Aires. He took office in June and proposed cultural programs intended to broaden access to cultural activities throughout the province.

In 2018, Piero ran for the Italian Chamber of Deputies in the South America constituency as a candidate of Italy's Democratic Party.

== Legal case ==
In the 2000s, Piero and several other directors of the Fundación Buenas Ondas were investigated and prosecuted in connection with alleged irregularities involving public subsidies for an educational agricultural project operated by the foundation. The provincial government had provided funding intended for scholarships for children and adolescents in vulnerable situations. Prosecutors alleged that the scholarships had not been implemented as intended.

The case eventually went to trial. In February 2012, Piero was declared in default after failing to appear at a scheduled hearing, and the Criminal Trial Court No. 5 of La Plata ordered his arrest. He did not serve a period of imprisonment. Later that month, the proceedings were declared time-barred and the arrest order was lifted.

The case ended through the expiration of the prosecution period rather than through a criminal conviction or acquittal on the underlying allegations.

== Personal life ==
Piero was married first to María Laura Lampreabe, with whom he had two children. Their son Mariano died 40 days after birth; their other son Juan, born in 1975, became a musician and actor.

Piero later married Mariana Schettini, with whom he had two children.

=== Death ===
Piero died in Buenos Aires on the morning of 7 October 2026, at the age of 81, after several pneumonia symptoms. He had been hospitalized at the Hospital Italiano for several days preceding his death. The Asociación Argentina de Actores y Actrices described him as an important figure in Argentine and Latin American popular music whose career also included acting and social activism.

== Discography ==
=== Studio and live albums ===
- 1969: Piero ("Mi viejo")
- 1970: Piero ("Pedro Nadie")
- 1970: Piero en Caracas ("Caminando por Caracas")
- 1972: Coplas de mi país
- 1973: Para el pueblo lo que es del pueblo
- 1975: Folklore a mi manera
- 1975: Sinfonía inconclusa en la mar
- 1976: Y mi gente dónde va (released in Argentina in 1982)
- 1981: Recuerdos
- 1981: Calor humano (live)
- 1982: Canto de la ternura
- 1983: Un hombre común (live)
- 1984: Qué generosa sos, mi tierra
- 1985: El regalao
- 1986: Las galaxias nos miran
- 1989: A pesar de los pesares
- 1989: Piero, 15 años después (live)
- 1991: Cachuso Rantifuso (with Marilina Ross and Juan Carlos Baglietto)
- 1993: Piero e Indra Devi, recorded at the Pyramid of Cheops in Egypt
- 1999: Piero & Pablo en vivo desde Colombia (with Pablo Milanés)
- 2015: Todavía no hicimos lo mejor (live recording from a tour in Chile)
- 2016: América

=== Compilations ===
- 1986: Gaviota
- 1987: 20 años
- 1988: Tríptico - Volumen 1
- 1989: Tríptico - Volumen 2
- 1993: Te quiero contar
- 2001: 30 años de canciones blindadas (including six previously unreleased tracks)
- 2002–2003: reissues of greatest hits (six albums)
- 2004: Colección Oro

=== Singles ===
- 1964: "El cachivache" / "Rosa, Rosita"
- 1965: "La sombrilla"
- 1969: "Si vos te vas" / "Mi viejo"
- 2022: "Manso y tranquilo" (with Che Sudaka)

=== Other appearances ===
- 1996: Todas las voces todas

== Filmography ==
- El profesor patagónico (1970) – Raúl, a young priest
- Heroína (1972) – musical performer
- Mercedes Sosa, como un pájaro libre (1983)
- Bang Bang (1990) – short film
- Fotos del alma (1995)

== Cultural references ==
Piero's "Mi viejo" was referenced in the Mexican Spanish dub of the The Simpsons episode "The Ziff Who Came to Dinner", in which Homer Simpson sings a parody of the song.

== Bibliography ==
- Maya Sierra, Maureen (2017). Piero, mi querido Piero. Penguin Random House Grupo Editorial Colombia. ISBN 978-958-899-158-0.
