= Tony Tornado =

Brazilian actor and singer

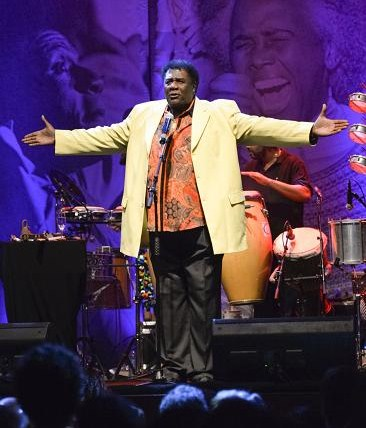

Background information
- Also known as: Tony Tornado
- Genres: soul music and funk

Antonio Viana Gomes, better known as Tony Tornado or Toni Tornado (Pirapozinho, May 26, 1930), is a Brazilian actor and singer. In 1970 he won the Brazilian stage of the V Festival Internacional da Canção with the soul song "BR-3".

== Biography ==
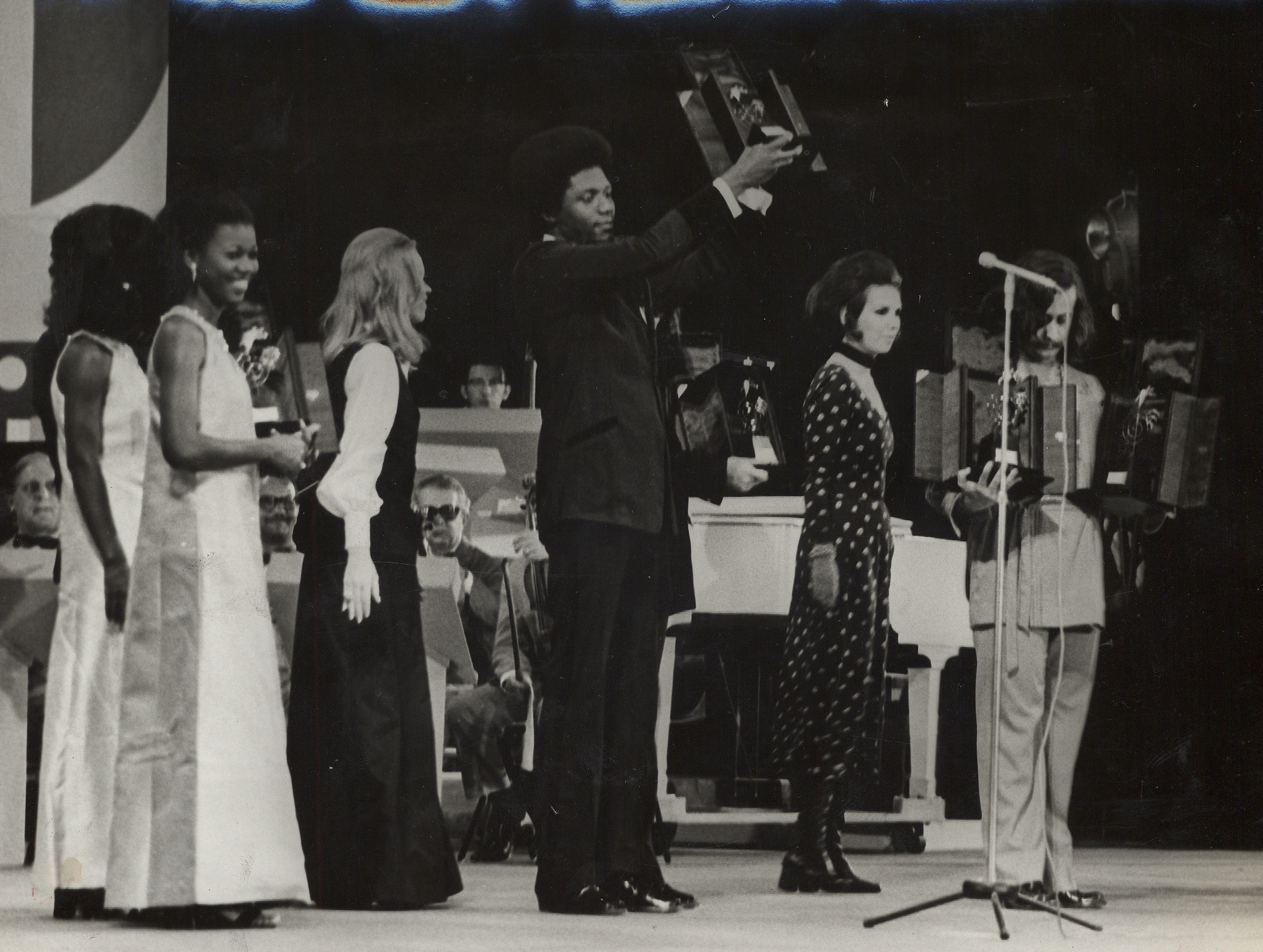
Tony Tornado and Trio Ternura at Festival Internacional da Canção, 1970.

Son of a Guyanese father and a Brazilian mother, at 11 years old Tony ran away from home and ended up in Rio de Janeiro where he became a street kid and made a living selling peanuts and shining shoes.

At 18 he served in the Deodoro School of Parachuting along with the future TV presenter and entrepreneur Silvio Santos. In 1957, he fought in the Suez Canal.

Tony began his artistic career in the '60s with the stage name Tony Checker, lip-synching and dancing on Jair Taumaturgo's show Hoje é dia de rock. That time Tony imitated singers Chubby Checker and Little Richard. After that, he traveled to the United States, where he lived for five years in New York.

In New York, Tony worked as a drug dealer and pimp, to deceive the immigration department, pretending to be an employee of a car wash. At that time, Tony met Tim Maia, another Brazilian singer who was living in New York.

Back in Brazil in 1969, he worked in Ed Lincoln's group and also sang at night under the pseudonym Johnny Bradfort, the owner of the club forced him to pretend to be a foreigner.

In 1970, he adopted the name with he came to be known, "Tony Tornado". Influenced by James Brown, Tony was one of the artists who introduced soul music and funk in Brazilian music.

That same year, alongside Trio Ternura, he defended the song BR-3, which got the first place in the festival. His first role on television was in 1972, on the telenovela Jerônimo on TV Tupi.

Tornado often participates in several soap operas and miniseries, although almost never in prominent roles. The biggest role of his career on TV was Gregório Fortunato, the "Black Angel", the chief of the security of president and statesman Getúlio Vargas in the 1993 miniseries Agosto, based on the work of Rubem Fonseca. Another important role of his career was the foreman Rodésio, who worked for Viúva Porcina (Regina Duarte) in Roque Santeiro. He also appeared as Ganga Zumba in Carlos Diegues's Quilombo.

Tornado was married to actress Arlete Salles in the '70s. He is the father of Lincoln Tornado, also an actor and singer.

Tornado later returned to performing on stages all over Brazil singing his greatest hits, accompanied by the band Funkessência and Lincoln Tornado.
