= Nelson Rodrigues Filho =

Brazilian cultural activist (1945–2026)

- Born: June 23, 1945; Rio de Janeiro, Brazil
- Died: February 25, 2026 (aged 80); Rio de Janeiro, Brazil
- Other name: Nelsinho
- Education: Rio de Janeiro State University
- Occupations: Electrical engineer, cultural producer, writer, journalist, theater director, university professor
- Employer: UERJ (professor of Brazilian Literature)
- Organization(s): Bloco do Barbas (founder); MR-8 (former member)
- Known for: Founder of the Bloco do Barbas carnival block Political prisoner during the military dictatorship Revival of street carnival in Rio de Janeiro
- Notable work: Adaptations of his father's plays Cultural productions and articles
- Father: Nelson Rodrigues

Nelson Rodrigues Filho (June 23, 1945 – February 25, 2026), more commonly known as Nelsinho, was a Brazilian electrical engineer, cultural producer, writer, and journalist. He was the son of playwright Nelson Rodrigues.

== Biography ==
Son of playwright Nelson Rodrigues and journalist Elza Bretanha, Nelson Rodrigues Filho was born in Rio de Janeiro in 1945. As an electrical engineering student at the Rio de Janeiro State University (UERJ), he became involved in the struggle against the Brazilian military dictatorship and joined the October 8 Revolutionary Movement (MR-8), a Marxist political organization that participated in the armed struggle against the dictatorship.

He was arrested by the military dictatorship. His father, Nelson Rodrigues, was in favor of the military dictatorship. Nelson Filho spent seven years imprisoned during the dictatorship and relied on his father's prestige with the military to avoid being killed. His father, Nelson Rodrigues, while visiting his son in prison, learned of the torture and changed sides, using his influence in the press to advocate for amnesty and demand his son's release, even sending letters to then-President João Figueiredo. He was tortured for three days and released only in 1979. Despite their ideological differences, he continued to maintain a good relationship with his father. After he left, he began working on adaptations of his father's works, at Nelson's request, and thus began working as an assistant director.

In 1985, with the end of the military regime, he founded Bar Barbas, a bar that became a tradition in the Botafogo neighborhood, where he created a space that expanded the concept of a restaurant, establishing himself as an important cultural producer in the city. With the redemocratization of the country, he was one of the founders of the Carnival Block, Barbas, considered one of the blocks that helped revive the tradition of street carnival in the city of Rio de Janeiro. The carnival block began as an extension of the bar, which despite having closed in the early 2000s, leaving from Botafogo, in the South Zone of Rio.

In addition to his career behind the bar, he earned a master's degree in Literary Theory from the Federal University of Rio de Janeiro (UFRJ), the same institution where he later completed his doctorate. After obtaining his doctorate, he became a professor of Brazilian Literature at UERJ. At UERJ, he was one of the founders of the institution's teachers' trade union.

== Personal life ==
Nelson suffered a hemorrhagic stroke at the end of November 2015. In 2024, he suffered another stroke. He was a Fluminense FC fan, just like his father.

=== Death ===
He died in the early hours of February 25, at the age of 80, at Unimed Barra Hospital, in the Barra da Tijuca neighborhood of Rio de Janeiro, where he had been hospitalized since Ash Wednesday with pneumonia and a urinary tract infection. His death was mourned by the Brazilian Ministry of Culture.
