= Leonardo Bruno =

Brazilian conductor

Leonardo Bruno (born May 30, 1945, in Coromandel, Brazil) is a Brazilian conductor, arranger, and composer. He served as the principal conductor of the Espírito Santo Symphony Orchestra and the Rio de Janeiro Philharmonic Orchestra. As an arranger, he is known for his work with Gilberto Gil, Zeca Pagodinho, Martinho da Villa, Beth Carvalho, Antônio Carlos & Jocáfi, and Clara Nunes. As a composer, he is recognized for his collaborations on songs such as Frevo Rasgado with Gilberto Gil, Maracatu do meu Avô with Nei Lopes, and Zumbi dos Palmares with Martinho da Vila.

== Biography ==
Leonardo Bruno Ferreira was born in Coromandel, Minas Gerais, Brazil. He began his musical career at the Ministry of Education Radio in Rio de Janeiro as a lyric singer at the age of 19. At the same time, he worked as a musician and singer in the play Liberdade, Liberdade, alongside Oduvaldo Vianna Filho, Paulo Autran, and Odete Lara. During this time, he was already performing with his father, the clarinetist Abel Ferreira.

== Career ==
In 1965, he did his first professional orchestration for the musician Sérgio Ricardo, a piece called Pena e Penar. In 1967, he was invited to join the orchestra of Rede Globo and later joined Érlon Chaves' orchestra. In the same year, he worked on arrangements for Gilberto Gil's debut album, Louvação, marking the beginning of their partnership. In the same year, along with Toquinho and other musicians from São Paulo, he became part of the Quinteto de Roda, formed by Gilberto Gil, for monthly performances at the Teatro Paramount, alternating with Caetano Veloso, Elis Regina, and Chico Buarque.

At the beginning of the 2000s, he performed with the Ribeirão Preto Symphony Orchestra as interim principal conductor. In the same year, he performed the Concerto Negro at the Municipal Theatre in Rio de Janeiro.

In 2002, he arranged opera O Alabê de Jerusalém, by the composer Altay Veloso. In 2004, he took over the children's choir, As Princesas de Petrópolis, which he created in 1999 and led until 2007.

In 2017, he became vice-president and titular conductor of the Rio de Janeiro Philharmonic Orchestra. The following year, he conducted the Bandeira da Fé concert in celebration of Martinho da Vila's 80th birthday. The performance was later released on a live album.
