= Nelson Rodrigues =

Brazilian playwright, journalist and novelist (1912–1980)

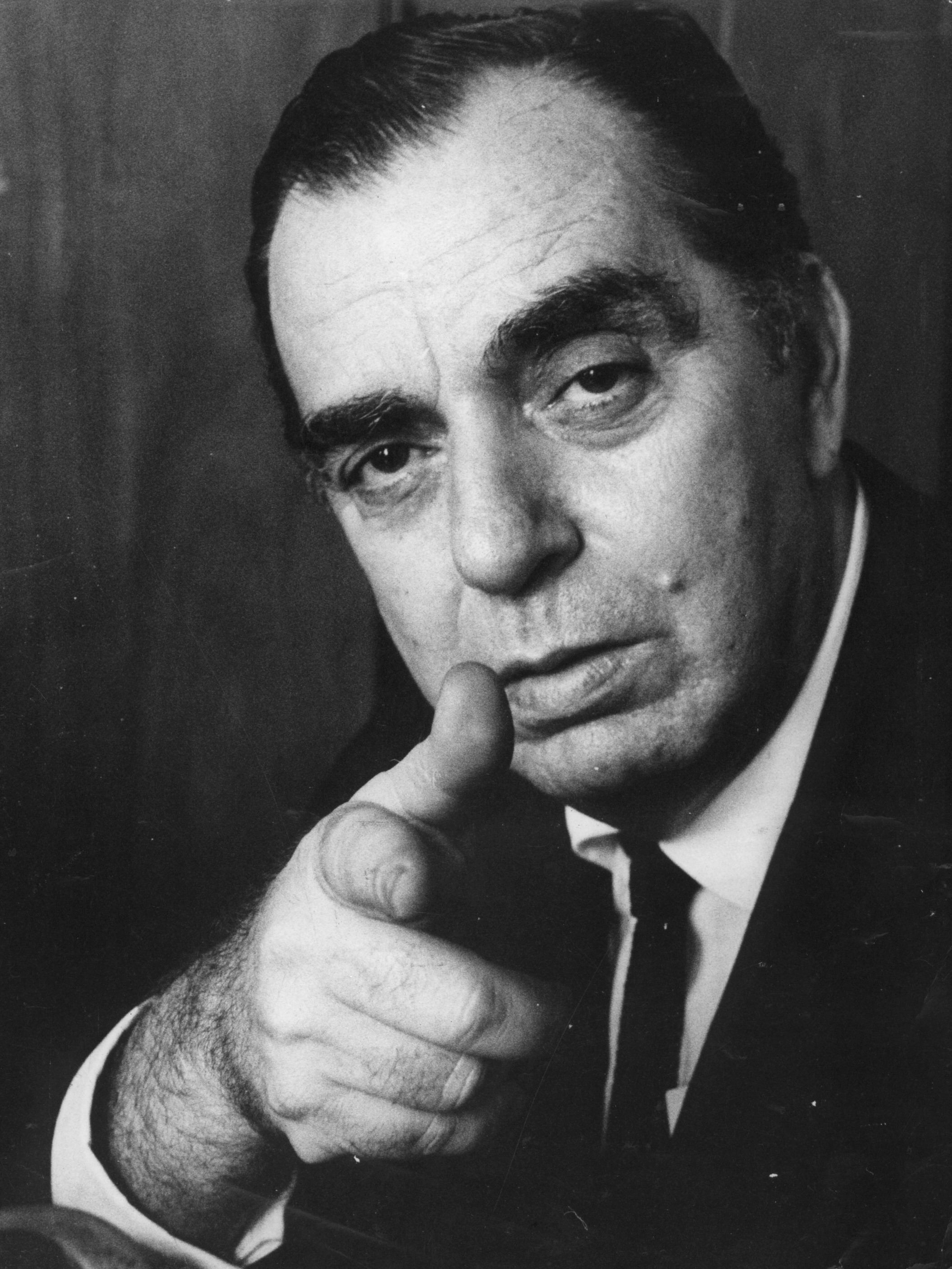
- Rodrigues in 1971
- Born: Baptised 23 August 1912; Recife, Pernambuco, Brazil
- Died: 21 December 1980 (aged 68); Rio de Janeiro, Brazil
- Occupations: Playwright, journalist and novelist
- Spouse: Elza Bretanha (1940–1950)
- Partner: Yolanda Camejo dos Santos (1952–1962)
- Children: Joffre Bretanha Rodrigues, Nelson Rodrigues Filho, Maria Lucia Rodrigues Muller, Sonia Rodrigues, Paulo Rodrigues

Nelson Falcão Rodrigues (August 23, 1912 – December 21, 1980) was a Brazilian playwright, journalist and novelist. In 1943, he helped usher in a new era in Brazilian theater with his play Vestido de Noiva (The Wedding Dress), considered revolutionary for the complex exploration of its characters' psychology and its use of colloquial dialogue. He went on to write many other seminal plays and today is widely regarded as Brazil's greatest playwright.

== Early life and work ==
Nelson Rodrigues was born in Recife, the capital of the Brazilian state of Pernambuco (in the Northeast of Brazil), to Mario Rodrigues, a journalist, and his wife, Maria Esther Falcão. In 1916, the family moved to Rio de Janeiro after Mario ran into trouble for criticizing a powerful local politician. In Rio, Mario rose through the ranks of one of the city's major newspaper and, in 1925, launched his own newspaper, A Critica, a sensationalist daily. By age fourteen Nelson was covering the police beating his father; by fifteen he had dropped out of school; and by sixteen he was writing his own column. The family's economic situation improved steadily, allowing them to move from a middle-class neighborhood in Zona Norte to what was then the exclusive neighborhood of Copacabana.

In less than two years the family's fortunes would be reversed spectacularly. In 1929, older brother Roberto, a talented graphic artist, was shot and killed at the newspaper offices by Sylvia Serafim, a writer who objected to the salacious coverage of her divorce, allegedly involving an adulterous affair with a local doctor. At her trial Serafim admitted that she had intended to kill Rodrigues' father Mario, the newspaper's owner; unable to find him, she settled for his son instead.

Devastated by his son's death, Mario Rodrigues died a few months later of a stroke, and shortly after that the family newspaper was closed by military forces supporting the Revolution of 1930, which the newspaper had fiercely opposed in its editorials. The ensuing years were dark ones for the Rodrigues family, and Nelson and his brothers were forced to seek work at rival newspapers for low wages. To make matters worse, in 1934 Nelson was diagnosed with tuberculosis, a disease that plagued him, on an off, for the next ten years.

During this time Rodrigues held various jobs including comic strip editor, sports columnists and opera critic.

In 1941, Rodrigues wrote his first play A Mulher Sem Pecado (The Woman Without Sin), to mixed reviews.

His following play, Vestido de Noiva (The Wedding Dress), was hailed as a watershed in Brazilian theater and is considered among his masterpieces. It began a fruitful collaboration with Polish émigré director Zbigniew Ziembinski, who is reported to have said on reading The Wedding Dress, "I am unaware of anything in world theater today that resembles this."

In the play, which takes place after the female protagonist is hit by a car and undergoes surgery, the playwright revealed the mastery of his craft by overlapping moments in time and place in order to create a more dynamic vision of reality. The stage is divided into three planes: one for real-time action happening around the character, another for her memories, a third for her dying hallucinations. As the three planes overlap, reality melds with memory and delusion. The play has been described as a jigsaw puzzle—we are left to interpret the truth from the disjointed hallucinations of a woman lying on an operating table who mixes her life story with the story of a prostitute whose diary she once read. Slowly we discover the mystery of the woman's accident.

== Family ==
Nelson Rodrigues married Elza Bretanha Rodrigues (1918–2017) on April 29, 1940, in Rio de Janeiro (formerly known as Guanabara). They had two children; Joffre (1941–2010) and Nelson (1945). Nelson was a womanizer and left his wife to date freely.

Rodrigues had a long-term relationship with Yolanda Camejo dos Santos (1932–2018) with whom he had three children; Maria Lucia (1953), Sonia (1955) and Paulo (1957). Yolanda threw Nelson out of her house when she discovered that Nelson was cheating on her. Rodrigues suspected the two girls weren't his but believed the boy was his son, even dedicating his column on Ultima Hora newspaper to Paulo on the day of his birth. A DNA test was done in 1996 between Elza's sons and Yolanda's children. The DNA test confirmed Maria Lucia, Sonia and Paulo were Nelson's children.

Rodrigues became briefly involved with a married woman, Lucia Lima (1931–2009) who became pregnant with Daniela (1963–2019) during their relationship. The child was born deaf, blind and mute. The relationship deteriorated and Rodrigues moved out, but continued to support the child. No paternity test was ever done. He was involved with other women before he rekindled with his wife Elza in the late 1970s, around the time that divorce became officially legal in the mostly Catholic nation.

== Writing ==
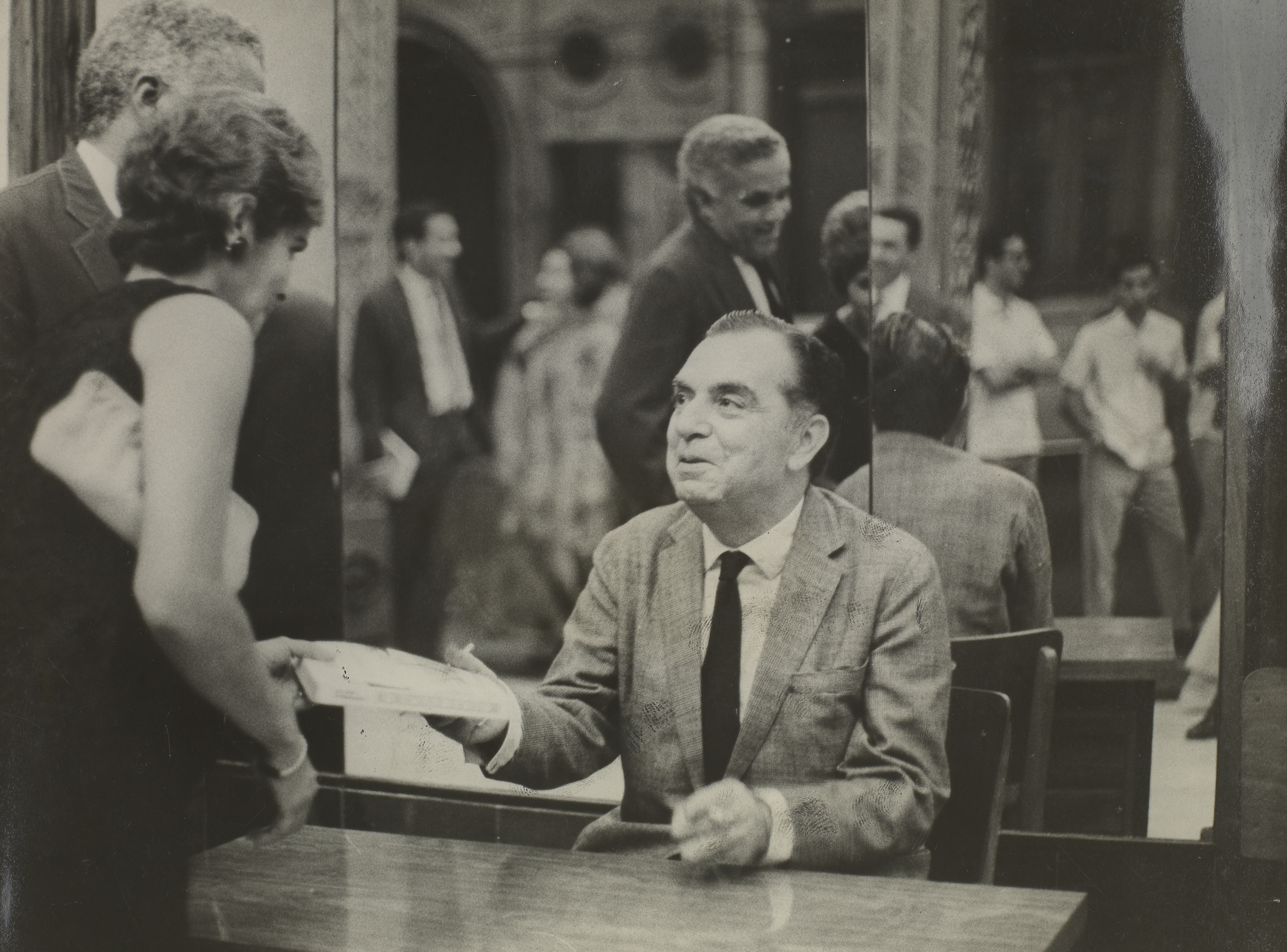
Nelson Rodrigues, 1967. National Archives of Brazil.

Nelson Rodrigues wrote 17 full-length plays, 9 novels and thousands of short stories. He was most influential as a playwright, and his plays include Toda Nudez Será Castigada (All Nudity Shall Be Punished), Dorotéia, and Beijo no Asfalto (The Asphalt Kiss, or The Kiss on the Asphalt), all considered classics of the Brazilian stage.

Rodrigues' plays were divided into three categories by critic Sábato Magaldi: psychological, mythical and Carioca tragedies. The latter plays, which include some of his later and best-known productions, are mostly tragicomedies where Rodrigues explored the lives of Rio's lower-middle class, a population never deemed worthy of the stage before him. From the beginning, Rodrigues's plays shocked audiences and attracted the attention of censors.

Rodrigues's third play (1945) "Álbum de família" (Family Album) chronicled a semi-mythical family living on the fringes of society and mired in incest, rape and murder. It was considered so controversial that it was censored and only allowed to be staged 21 years later.

Other important earlier plays included "Anjo Negro" (Black Angel), an explosive 1946 play held from the stage by censorship until 1948 that deals with issues of race and incest. In the play — which takes place in a semi-mythical setting, which is never identified — a successful black doctor marries a white woman and their marriage cannot help but reflect the dysfunctional race relations of society at large. The woman slowly kills their black children one by one, and the husband does nothing to intervene. When the doctor's white brother arrives, his wife sleeps with him in the hopes of having a white son.

In the 1960 play "O Beijo no Asfalto" (The Asphalt Kiss or the Kiss on the Asphalt), Rodrigues tackled the issue of homophobia. In the play, a recently married man comforts a dying stranger who has just been run over in a traffic accident. A newspaper reporter witnesses the kiss and spins a salacious story that the two were lovers. The kiss occurs before the play actually begins and, Rashomon-like, it assumes different characteristics according to who describes it. Slowly, the innuendos and lies begin to corrode the young man's marriage. The play was written in 1960 at the request of actress Fernanda Montenegro. Rodrigues reportedly wrote it in three weeks.

"Os Sete Gatinhos" (Seven Kittens) was described by the playwright as a "divine comedy." Determined to remind us that things are not always what they appear, Rodrigues created the Noronha family, a seemingly normal lower-middle-class Brazilian family headed by the family patriarch, a low-level employee in the Brazilian congress. As the action unfolds, we become aware that nothing is as it seems. Four of the five daughters are prostitutes, and the one teen daughter who is held up as the symbol of chastity by the family is no longer a virgin. Amid an atmosphere where seemingly realist outlook becomes unreal vulgarity - the mother writes obscenities on the bathroom wall, the father prohibits the family from using toilet paper - the family's many unspoken secrets climax into a gruesome last scene.

"Doroteia" (1949), is one of five plays Magdali classified as mythical. It is a surreal play in which Rodrigues anticipates Ionesco and Beckett's theater of the absurd. Filled with guilt after the death of her son, Doroteia abandons a life of prostitution and seeks redemption in the house of her three cousins, all widows. The cousins disdain all sensuality and live a puritanical life of chastity and privations. To accept Doroteia, they impose one condition, she must disfigure her appearance and become ugly. In the play, men are completely absent, except for a pair of boots on stage meant to represent the fiancé of the daughter of one of the widows, Das Dores, who is actually the ghost of a stillborn child.

"Toda Nudez Será Castigada" (All Nudity Shall Be Punished) is a "Carioca tragedy' written 1965, and along with The Wedding Dress is one of his most-produced plays. It is the story of despondent widower Herculano who has promised never to remarry. His son, Serginho is the self-appointed guardian of his father's celibacy. When Herculano's brother introduces him to a lively prostitute and nightclub singer he is smitten and brings her home to live with him, unwittingly creating a menage á trois with his own son and wreaking havoc on the entire household. Much of the film's humor revolves around Herculano's need to make everything look right and proper to his bourgeois neighbours and friends. In 1973, the play was made into a film by the same name, which won the silver bear at the 23rd Berlin International Film Festival.

In spite of his success as a playwright, Rodrigues never dedicated himself exclusively to the theater. In the 1950s, Rodrigues began publishing daily short stories as part of highly successful column A Vida Como Ela É (Life As It Is). Rodrigues wrote the column six days a week eleven years, writing an estimated 2,000 of these stories. The stories in the column became a laboratory for many of his full length plays. They have since been republished in several collections.

Rodrigues also wrote soap operas, movie scripts, and novels. In the 1960s and 70s, he became a well-known TV persona and sports commentator. His fanciful columns on soccer, where he melded scant commentary on the games' happenings with his literary obsessions and stock phrases, are said by Alex Bellos to have taken football-writing "into a new dimension".

During this period, Rodrigues relished his role as an iconoclast and had running feuds with major figures of the Brazilian Left and Right.

== Death ==
In the 1970s, at the height of his reputation as a journalist and playwright, Rodrigues health began to fail because of lifelong gastroenterological and heart problems. Rodrigues died on December 21, 1980, at 68 years of age, of cardiac and respiratory complications. He is buried in Cemitério de São João Batista, in Botafogo. Ironically, the writer of tragic stories died a few hours before he won the lottery with his younger brother, Augusto and friends.

== Controversies, literary and political ==
Much of Rodrigues's career was filled with controversy, a state of affairs he often courted and even relished. He called his theater "the theater of the unpleasant" and had an almost messianic conviction that it was his duty to hold a mirror up to society's hypocrisies and to expose the darkness in the audience's heart. "We must fill the stage with murderers, adulterers, madmen; in short, we must fire a salvo of monsters at the audience," he said. "They are our monsters, which we will temporarily free ourselves from only to face another day". According to the critic Paulo Francis Rodrigues' constant subject-matter was simple: "human beings are prisoners of irresistible passions, taken as shameful by society [...] and usually punished [...] Nelson was a moral conservative, with a talent for depicting emotions below the waist".

From the very start of his playwright career, Rodrigues' was labeled by conservative critics as a "pervert" for his nearly obsessive exploration of sexual taboos (adultery, homosexuality, incest) in his plays, novels and columns. However, as various critics have remarked, Rodrigues' theater and narrative fiction themselves partake of a deeply felt conservative streak shared by other Modernist Brazilian writers (Raul Pompéia, Octavio de Faria, Lúcio Cardoso, among others) a moral anguish before modern society and the menaces offered by it to traditional religiosity and morals: the flaunting of traditional sexual taboos, specially, being felt as sharply increasing an awareness of moral guilt for living in a society felt as increasingly amoral, where the old hierarchies and taboos were being actively destroyed. An anguish for order that could be summarized by Rodrigues' famous quote: "all women like to be spanked" (Toda mulher gosta de apanhar). During the 1960s, Rodrigues was to write that giving room for the young to offer opinion was to turn society upside down, and that Betty Friedan should be locked in a mental institution.

It was exactly this implicit awareness of the immorality of existing social relations - the portrayal of the family as both sacred and failed - that didn't endear Nelson Rodrigues to fellow conservatives: after reading Album de Família, his close friend, the poet Manuel Bandeira, offered him the advice to try his hand at writing about "normal people". In the early 1950s, the myth of Rodrigues as pervert bogey was already well established: in 1953, politician Carlos Lacerda compared excerpts from Rodrigues' column to the Communist Manifesto to "prove" that Rodrigues's column was part of a Communist conspiracy to subvert family values; in 1957, a conservative Rio de Janeiro councilman, present at the opening night of Rodrigues' play Perdoa-me por me traíres (Forgive me for cheating on me) pointed a gun at the applauding audience for condoning what he regarded as an immoral play. During the military dictatorship, Rodrigues' 1966 novel O Casamento, about a middle-aged businessman who gradually realizes his incestuous love towards his daughter on the eve of her wedding, was withdrawn from circulation by government censorship for alleged indecency.

As a playwright, Rodrigues is frequently considered a realist, mostly on account of the self-acknowledged influence exerted on him by the dramatic work of Eugene O'Neill - specially in his earlier, "mythical" plays. Actually, in terms of style, Rodrigues' work is a kind of belatedly Expressionism, combining an appearance of empirical reality (the accurate portrayal of small everyday happenings and the use of the contemporary Brazilian vernacular) surrounding a kernel of mythologized, intense and unrealistic - to the point of "cartoonish absurdity" - psychological dramatic action. In it, the viewpoint is always that of the small man who acts as the writer's alter ego, with his "obtuse, fanatic, delirious obsessions" - the small man of the 1950s Rio de Janeiro lower middle-class, who, as Rodrigues himself, had "a single suit, a single pair of shoes", and was torn between the longing for a lost moral order - specially, when a male, to the threat posed to his authority by the incipient female emancipation fostered by the development of an urban milieu and its possibilities of unwitnessed encounters and his (or hers) sexual drives. In short, his work displays a "violent prejudiced patriarchal society" confronted to "all manner of sexual repression, perversions and taboos".

It was this viewpoint that explained Rodrigues' antipathy towards the higher middle-class intelligentsia that made much of the political Left of the period ("I'm not moved by marches of the ruling classes", was he to say before a march of protesters against the military dictatorship). Conversely, for those Brazilian writers that equated modernism in literature with support for social change, Rodrigues' longings for a lost old order made it impossible to accept the reality of his formal innovations: for the modernist Oswald de Andrade, Rodrigues' literature was "nothing but a wretched newspaper feuilleton", and Rodrigues himself "an ill-educated, [albeit] illustrious, pervert". However, in 1962, Rodrigues' 1958 play Boca de Ouro (The Golden Mouth) - the tragedy of a mobster of the illegal Brazilian animal lottery (jogo do bicho) known for his set of gold false teeth, hence the title - was to be adapted to the screen by leftist director Nelson Pereira dos Santos, who tried to meld Rodrigues' moralizing streak with Brechtian social drama and American mob film.

A fervent, spontaneous anticommunist already before the military coup d'etat of 1964, Rodrigues was generally regarded as apolitical before the dictatorship, during which he was to engage in constant clashes and running feuds with the Left. During much of the 1960s and early 1970s, he included incendiary attacks in his newspaper column against various opponents of the dictatorship—a list that ranged from leaders of leftist movements and guerrilla organizations to the bishop of Olinda Helder Câmara and the Catholic literary critic Alceu Amoroso Lima, eventually leading charges of being an apologist for the dictatorship. One of his collections of articles - where he offered, in an almost daily basis, an exquisite mix of adulation for the dictatorship and denunciation of allegedly communist plots -he proudly titled O Reacionário (The Reactionary).

His support for the dictatorship, however, was by no means unconditional. In 1968, he participated in an anti-censorship rally to protest the closing of eight plays by the military censors, and signed a petition that formally requested that such censorship be rescinded. He also successfully intervened to help release well-known leftist Helio Pellegrino from jail and testified at a military tribunal in favor of jailed student activist Wladimir Palmeira. He managed to keep among his friends several people who were confirmed leftists at the time, people like theater director Augusto Boal, actor and black activist Abdias do Nascimento, and filmmaker Arnaldo Jabor.

In his later years, such support for the dictatorship was tempered by the arrest and torture of his son, a militant opponent of the regime. In one of his last political interventions, he asked for a general amnesty of political prisoners. Afterwards, in poor health and unable to write during most of the late 1970s, Rodrigues died in 1980 in Rio de Janeiro.

After his death, landmark productions of his plays in the 1980s and 1990s as well as the publication of several collections of his writings helped secure his reputation as a great playwright and literary figure.

He also supported Fluminense.

== Works ==
Plays
- 1941: A Mulher sem Pecado
- 1943: Vestido de Noiva
- 1946: Álbum de Família
- 1947: Anjo Negro
- 1947: Senhora dos Afogados
- 1949: Dorotéia
- 1951: Valsa No. 6
- 1953: A Falecida
- 1957: Viúva, Porém Honesta
- 1957: Perdoa-me por me Traíres
- 1958: Os Sete Gatinhos
- 1958: Boca de Ouro
- 1960: Beijo no Asfalto
- 1962: Otto Lara Resende ou Bonitinha, mas Ordinária
- 1965: Toda Nudez Será Castigada
- 1973: Anti-Nélson Rodrigues
- 1978: A Serpente

Novels
- 1944: Meu Destino é Pecar (as Suzana Flag)
- 1946: Escravas do Amor (as Suzana Flag)
- 1946: Minha Vida (as Suzana Flag)
- 1947: A Mulher Que Amou de Mais (as Suzana Flag)
- 1947: O Homem Proíbido (as Suzana Flag)
- 1948: Núpcias de Fogo (as Suzana Flag)
- 1953: A Mentira
- 1959 Asfalto Selvagem (also known as Engraçadinha)
- 1966: O Casamento
Newspaper column collections
- 1967: Memórias de Nélson Rodrigues
- 1968: A Cabra Vadia
- 1970: O Óbvio Ululante
- 1971: A Sombra Das Chuteiras Imortais
- 1972: A Pátria em Chuteiras
- 1977: O Reacionário
- 1978: O Remador de Ben-Hur
- 2006: A Vida Como Ela É...

=== Works in English ===
- Selected Plays (including Wedding Dress; Waltz No. 6; All Nudity Will Punished; Forgive Me for Your Betrayal; Family Portraits; Black Angel; and Seven Little Kitties). London: Oberon Books, 2019. ISBN 978-1786827159

== See also ==
- Mongrel complex
