= Evinha =

Brazilian singer (born 1951)

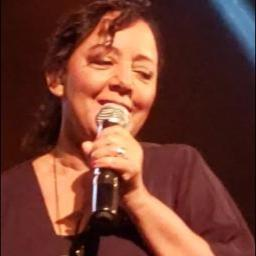
- Evinha in 2024
- Born: Eva Corrêa José Maria; 17 September 1951 (age 74); Rio de Janeiro, Brazil
- Occupation: Singer
- Years active: 1961–present
- Musical career
- Genres: MPB, pop, soul

Eva Corrêa José Maria (born 17 September 1951), known professionally as Evinha, is a Brazilian singer.

== Life and career ==
Born in Rio de Janeiro, Evinha began her professional career in 1961 as a member of Trio Esperança alongside her siblings Mário and Regina. In 1968, when Regina got pregnant and the trio went on hiatus, she made her solo debut with "Casaco Marrom", which turned to be a hit. In 1969, she won the fourth Festival Internacional da Canção with "Cantiga por Luciana" and released her first album Eva 2001. In the 1970s she got several hits, notably "As canções que você fez pra mim" (composed by Roberto and Erasmo Carlos), "Teletema", and "Que bandeira". In the second half of the decade she started a collaboration both in studio and live performances with Paul Mauriat and his orchestra. After marrying Mauriat orchestra's pianist Gerard Gambus, she moved to Paris and slowed her activities.

In the 1990s Evinha rejoined Trio Esperança, with her sister Marisa replacing her brother Mario. In 1999, she returned to perform in Brazil and recorded a new album, Reencontro. In the 2020s, her success revamped when her 1971 song "Esperar pra ver" was used in a Renault commercial campaign and was later sampled by rapper BK'.

Evinha was included by Rolling Stone Brasil in their list of the 100 greatest voices in Brazilian music.

== Discography ==
Album

- Eva 2001 (1969)
- Eva (1970)
- Cartão Postal (1971)
- Evinha (1973)
- Eva (1974)
- Reencontro (1999)
- Uma Voz, um Piano (2016)
- Evinha Canta Guilherme Arantes (2019)
