= Trio Esperança =

Brazilian vocal trio

- Origin: Rio de Janeiro, Brazil
- Discography: A Capela do Brasil (1990s); De Bach a Jobim (2010); Doce França (2013)
- Years active: 1958-present
- Members: Mário, Regina and Evinha Correia José Maria

Trio Esperança is a Brazilian vocal trio, formed in the city of Rio de Janeiro in 1958, by the siblings Mário, Regina and Evinha Correia José Maria. They had several hits in Brazil, such as "Festa do Bolinha" and "Filme Triste" - a version of the pop song "Sad Movies (Make Me Cry)", released as a single in 1962, and released albums through Polygram Records, EMI, Universal Music and Philips Records.

After releasing four albums in France, the Trio Esperança took a break from the music business in 2002. The band returned on stage in 2008. In 2010, the Trio Esperança, composed of Evinha, Regina and Mariza, released a new album De Bach a Jobim on French label Dreyfus Jazz. The disc featured covers of music by The Beatles, Bach, and Antonio Carlos Jobim, in addition to original material.

In 2013, almost 20 years after the release of "A Capela do Brasil", the first album they released in France, the Trio Esperança decided to pay tribute to French music, with their personal take on 14 songs by emblematic French artists, releasing a new album "Doce França"
