= Teatro Carlos Gomes =

Historic theater in Brazil

Coordinates: 22.9075°S 43.1826°W

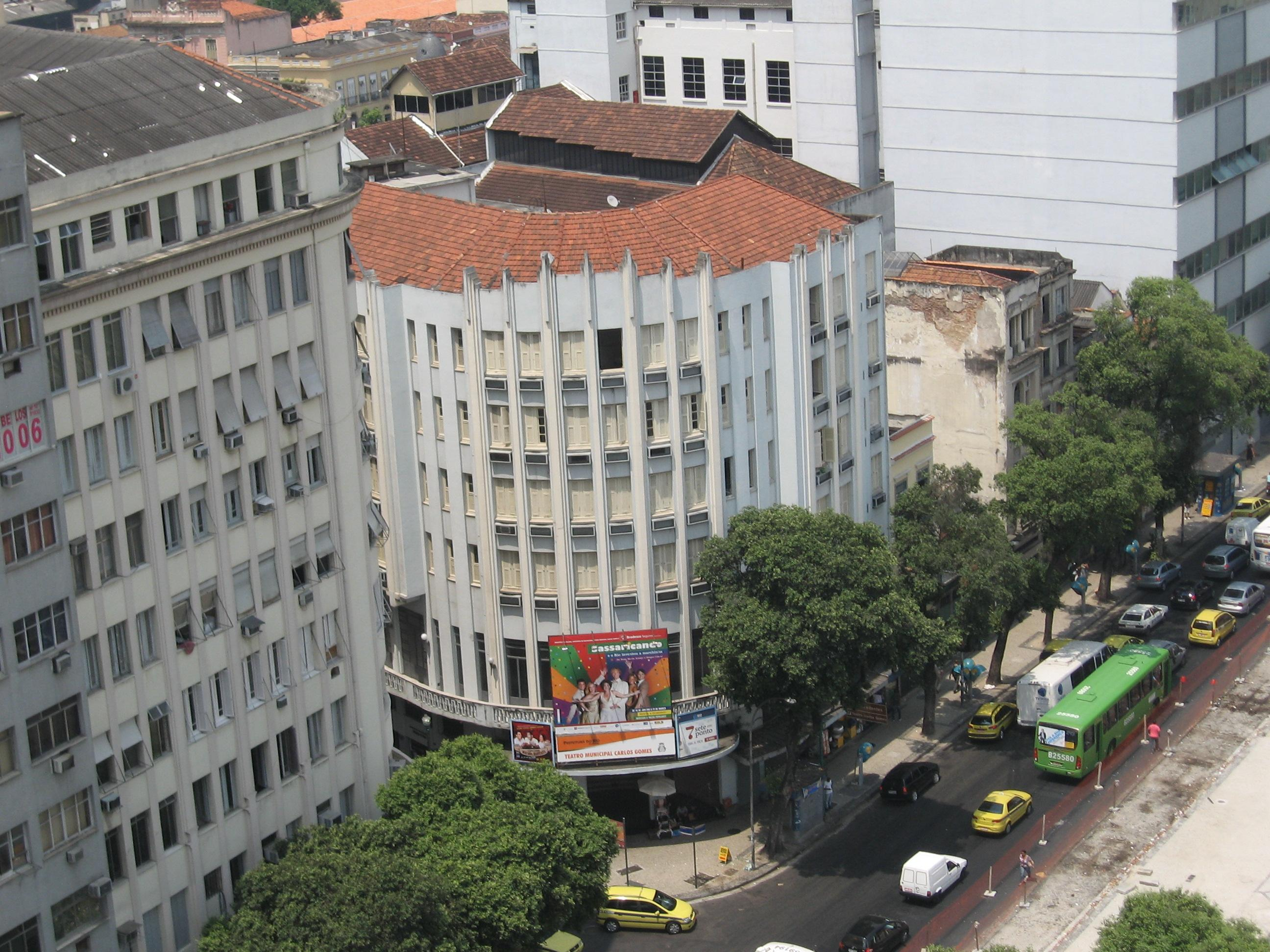

Teatro Carlos Gomes is a theatre in Rio de Janeiro, Brazil. It was established in 1868 in the Hotel Richelieu.

Teatro Carlos Gomes is a theater located in Praça Tiradentes, in the center of the city of Rio de Janeiro. It is one of the most traditional theaters in the country.

Its primitive facilities were inaugurated in 1872, when it was called Theater Franc-Brésiliene, later denominated like Theater Santana and, finally, with the current denomination. Throughout its history, these facilities were devastated by three large fires.

Currently has a capacity for an audience of 760 people, highlighting the three foyers in Art Deco style - one below the entrance, another up and third in the galleries - with floor in pads and stairs in marble. The theatre has ten dressing rooms (five singles), distributed on four floors.

The name of the theater is a tribute to the composer Antônio Carlos Gomes.
