= Teatro da Pontifícia Universidade Católica de São Paulo =

Theatre in São Paulo

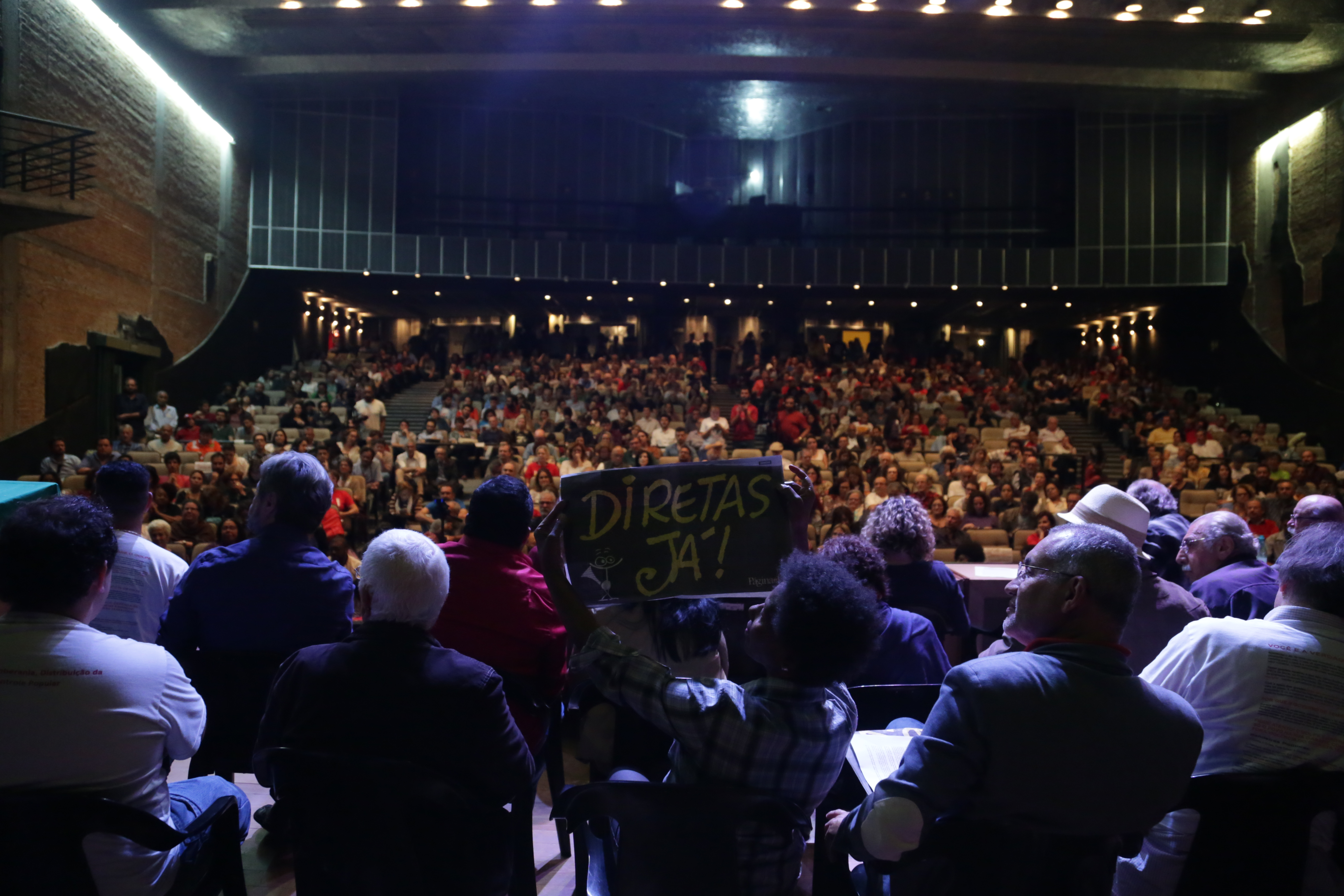
- Interactive map of Teatro da Pontifícia Universidade Católica de São Paulo
- Location: São Paulo, Brazil
- Coordinates: 23°32′19″S 46°40′17″W

Website
- Official website

Teatro da Pontifícia Universidade Católica de São Paulo (TUCA) is a theatre in São Paulo, Brazil.
