= List of accolades received by To the Left of the Father =

The following is the complete list of awards and nominations received by 2001 film To the Left of the Father.

Awards
Award	Date of ceremony	Category	Recipients and nominees	Result
Montreal World Film Festival	September 2001	Best Artistic Contribution	Luiz Fernando Carvalho	Won
Biarritz Film Festival	October 2001	Special Jury Prize	Luiz Fernando Carvalho	Won
Rio de Janeiro International Film Festival	October 2001	Ministry of Culture Award	Luiz Fernando Carvalho	Won
São Paulo International Film Festival	October 2001	Best Film - Audience Award	Luiz Fernando Carvalho	Won
Festival de Brasília	November 2001	Best Film	Luiz Fernando Carvalho	Won
Festival de Brasília	November 2001	Best Actor	Selton Mello	Won
Festival de Brasília	November 2001	Best Actress in a Supporting Role	Juliana Carneiro da Cunha	Won
Festival de Brasília	November 2001	Best Actor in a Supporting Role	Leonardo Medeiros	Won
Festival de Brasília	November 2001	Best Cinematography	Walter Carvalho	Won
Festival de Brasília	November 2001	Best Original Score	Marco Antônio Guimarães	Won
Festival de Brasília	November 2001	ANDI/ Unicef Award		Won
Havana Film Festival	December 2001	Special Jury Prize	Luiz Fernando Carvalho	Won
Havana Film Festival	December 2001	Best Original Score	Marco Antônio Guimarães	Won
Havana Film Festival	December 2001	Best Actor	Selton Mello	Won
Havana Film Festival	December 2001	Best Cinematography	Walter Carvalho	Won
Tiradentes Film Festival	January 2002	Best Film - Audience Award	Luiz Fernando Carvalho	Won
Santo Domingo International Film Festival	February 2002	Best Film	Luiz Fernando Carvalho	Won
Santo Domingo International Film Festival	February 2002	Best Cinematography	Walter Carvalho	Won
Cartagena Film Festival	March 2002	Best Film	Luiz Fernando Carvalho	Won
Cartagena Film Festival	March 2002	Best Director	Luiz Fernando Carvalho	Won
Cartagena Film Festival	March 2002	Best Cinematography	Walter Carvalho	Won
Cartagena Film Festival	March 2002	Special Jury Prize for Original Score	Marco Antônio Guimarães	Won
Cartagena Film Festival	March 2002	Cartagena Filmclubs Award	Luiz Fernando Carvalho	Won
Guadalajara International Film Festival	March 2002	Best Film	Luiz Fernando Carvalho	Won
Guadalajara International Film Festival	March 2002	Best Director	Luiz Fernando Carvalho	Won
Guadalajara International Film Festival	March 2002	Critic’s Award – Best Film	Luiz Fernando Carvalho	Won
SESC São Paulo Award	March 2002	Best Film	Luiz Fernando Carvalho	Won
SESC São Paulo Award	March 2002	Best Actress - Audience Award	Juliana Carneiro da Cunha	Won
SESC São Paulo Award	March 2002	Best Film – Jury Award	Luiz Fernando Carvalho	Won
The Art Critics Association of São Paulo (APCA)	March 2002	Best Actress	Juliana Carneiro da Cunha	Won
Lleida Latin-American Film Festival	April 2002	Best Screenplay	Luiz Fernando Carvalho	Won
Lleida Latin-American Film Festival	April 2002	Best Actor	Selton Mello	Won
Buenos Aires International Festival of Independent Cinema	April 2002	Best Film – Audience Award	Luiz Fernando Carvalho	Won
Buenos Aires International Festival of Independent Cinema	April 2002	Best Cinematography	Walter Carvalho	Won
Buenos Aires International Festival of Independent Cinema	April 2002	Special Jury Prize	Walter Carvalho	Won
Buenos Aires International Festival of Independent Cinema	April 2002	KODAK Award – Best Cinematography	Walter Carvalho	Won
Prêmio ABC de Cinematografia	May 2002	Best Cinematography	Walter Carvalho	Won
Los Angeles Latino International Film Festival	August 2002	Best Director	Luiz Fernando Carvalho	Won
Encuentro Latinoamericano de Cine	August 2002	Fellini Medal	Luiz Fernando Carvalho	Won
Encuentro Latinoamericano de Cine	August 2002	Best Actor	Selton Mello	Won
Encuentro Latinoamericano de Cine	August 2002	Best Film – Cinema Magazine La Gran Ilusión	Luiz Fernando Carvalho	Won
Grande Prêmio do Cinema Brasileiro	September 2002	Best Film	Luiz Fernando Carvalho	Nominated
Grande Prêmio do Cinema Brasileiro	September 2002	Best Director	Luiz Fernando Carvalho	Nominated
Grande Prêmio do Cinema Brasileiro	September 2002	Best Actor	Raul Cortez	Nominated
Grande Prêmio do Cinema Brasileiro	September 2002	Best Actor	Selton Mello	Nominated
Grande Prêmio do Cinema Brasileiro	September 2002	Best Actress	Juliana Carneiro da Cunha	Won
Grande Prêmio do Cinema Brasileiro	September 2002	Best Actor in supporting role	Leonardo Medeiros	Nominated
Grande Prêmio do Cinema Brasileiro	September 2002	Best Actress in supporting role	Simone Spoladore	Nominated
Grande Prêmio do Cinema Brasileiro	September 2002	Best Cinematography	Walter Carvalho	Won
International Film Camera Festival “Manaki Brothers”	September 2002	Golden Camera 300	Walter Carvalho	Won
International Film Camera Festival “Manaki Brothers”	September 2002	Best Film – Audience Award	Luiz Fernando Carvalho	Won
Valdivia International Film Festival	October 2002	Best Film	Luiz Fernando Carvalho	Won
Trieste Film Festival	October 2002	Best Film	Luiz Fernando Carvalho	Won
Belfort Film Festival	November 2002	Best Film - Audience Award	Luiz Fernando Carvalho	Won
Santa Maria da Feira Film Festival	November 2002	Best Film - Audience Award	Luiz Fernando Carvalho	Won
Santa Maria da Feira Film Festival	November 2002	Best Film - Jury Award	Luiz Fernando Carvalho	Won
