= Passo de anjo =

Studio album by SpokFrevo Orquestra
- Released: 2004
- Genre: Frevo
- Length: 37:55
- Label: Biscoito Fino
- Producer: Spok, Gilberto Pontes

SpokFrevo Orquestra chronology
Passo de anjo (2004)	Passo de anjo ao vivo (2008)

Passo de anjo is the debut album of the Brazilian big band SpokFrevo Orquestra. Released in 2004, the album was praised for its innovation of frevo, which presents some influences from jazz, emphasizing improvisations. The album was firstly released independently. However, two years later, due to its success, it was released again by Biscoito Fino.

The disc presents reinterpretations of old frevo classics, but also presents new compositions. Between many musicians which participated of its recording, one can cite Antonio Nóbrega, which plays violin in some songs.

Passo de anjo was elected by O Estado de S. Paulo as one of the three best albums released in 2004.

== Track listing ==
#	Title	Songwriters	Length
1.	"Passo de anjo"	João Lyra, Spok	2:54
2.	"Ponta de lança"	Clóvis Pereira	3:15
3.	"Nino, o pernambuquinho"	Duda	3:43
4.	"Ela me disse"	Luciano Oliveira	6:11
5.	"Frevo da luz"	Luizinho Duarte, Carlinhos Ferreira	2:45
6.	"Mexe com tudo"	Levino Ferreira	3:24
7.	"Frevo sanfonado"	Sivuca, Glorinha Gadelha	4:10
8.	"Nas quebradas"	Hermeto Pascoal	3:05
9.	"Pontapé"	Adelson Viana	3:20
10.	"Lágrima de folião"	Levino Ferreira	2:22
11.	"Frevo aberto"	Edson Rodrigues	2:40

== Personnel ==
SpokFrevo Orquestra:

- Spok: saxophone
- Gilberto Pontes: saxophone
- Gilmar Black: saxophone
- Gustavo Anacleto: saxophone
- Enok Chagas: trumpet
- Fábio Costa: trumpet
- José Francisco (Pêto): trumpet
- Alexandre "Papa-Légua": trumpet
- Jailson José: trumpet
- Germeson Silva: trumpet
- Nilsinho Amarante: trombone
- Marcílio Batista: trombone
- Cléber Silva: trombone
- Flávio Souza: trombone
- Jorge Guerra: trombone
- Adelson Silva: percussion
- Augusto Silva: percussion
- Elisângelo de Oliveira: percussion
- Renato Bandeira: guitar
- Hélio Silva: bass

Special guests:

- Adelson Viana: accordion and keyboards (in "Frevo da luz" and "Pontapé")
- Ítalo Oliveira: keyboards (in "Frevo da luz" and "Pontapé")
- Heriberto Cavalcanti: flute (in "Frevo da luz" and "Pontapé")
- Carlinhos Ferreira: clarinet (in "Frevo da luz" and "Pontapé")
- Cristiano Pessoa: guitar (in "Frevo da luz" and "Pontapé")
- Miquéias Sousa: bass (in "Frevo da luz" and "Pontapé")
- Adriano Giffone: bass (in "Frevo da luz" and "Pontapé")
- Luizinho Duarte: drums (in "Frevo da luz" and "Pontapé")
- Tarcísio de Lima: (in "Frevo da luz" and "Pontapé")
- Antônio Hoto: percussion (in "Frevo da luz" and "Pontapé")
- Antonio Nóbrega: violin (in "Lágrima de folião")
- Zezinho Pitoco: clarinet (in "Lágrima de folião")
- Edmilson Capeluppi: acoustic guitar (in "Lágrima de folião")
- Gabriel Almeida: pandeiro (in "Lágrima de folião")
- Luciano Oliveira: guitar (in "Ela me disse")
- Marimbanda: arrangement (in "Frevo da luz")
- Genaro: accordion (in "Frevo sanfonado")
