= Suassuna =

Suassuna is a surname. Notable people with the surname include:

- Ariano Suassuna (1927–2014), Brazilian playwright and author
- João Suassuna (1886–1930), Brazilian politician
