= Juliana Carneiro da Cunha =

French-Brazilian actress and dancer

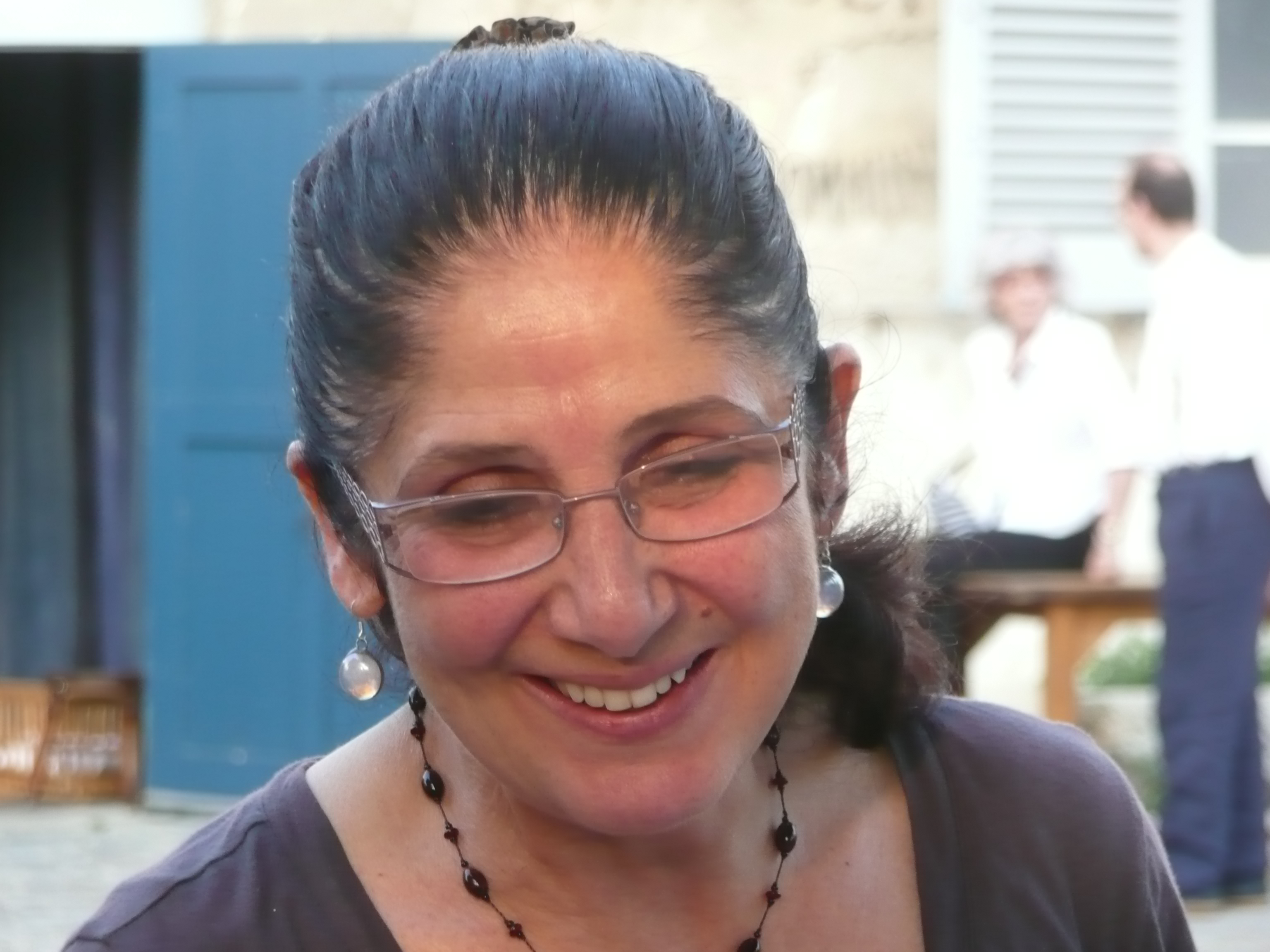
- Juliana Carneiro da Cunha (2010)
- Born: Juliana Carneiro da Cunha; January 19, 1949 (age 76); Rio de Janeiro, Brazil
- Occupation(s): Actress and dancer
- Years active: 1975-present

Juliana Carneiro da Cunha (Brazilian Portuguese: [ʒuliˈɐnɐ kaʁˈne(j)ɾu da ˈkũɲɐ]; born January 19, 1949) is a French-Brazilian actress and dancer. She has worked at the Théâtre du Soleil in Paris since 1990.

== Biography ==
In Europe, Juliana Carneiro da Cunha worked with Maurice Béjart, Maguy Marin and Ariane Mnouchkine. Since 1990, she is part of the Théâtre du Soleil group, directed by Ariane Mnouchkine, with whom she developed a lasting relationship.

She was recognized in Brazilian cinema for her award-winning performance in the film To the Left of the Father (2001), directed by Luiz Fernando Carvalho, in which she plays the mother of André (Selton Mello), the prodigal son who returns to the house and finally shakes the foundations of the family of Lebanese origin. Her most recent cinematographic work is The Venom of the Madrugada (2004), directed by Ruy Guerra, where she works alongside Leonardo Medeiros, with whom she also worked in Lavoura Arcaica.

Carneiro da Cunha has also recently appeared in Brazilian television in the mini-series Hoje é dia de Maria (2005), also directed by Luiz Fernando Carvalho.

She is the cousin of the actors Mateus Solano, Gabriela Carneiro da Cunha and Beatriz Carneiro da Cunha.

== Theater ==
Her career as an actress began on a Brazilian theater stage and includes works such as As Lágrimas Amargas de Petra von Kant (English title: Petra von Kant's Bitter Tears), featuring Fernanda Montenegro, in 1982, and Mão na Luva (English title: Hand in the Glove), featuring Marco Nanini, in 1984.

== Television ==
Her last TV project was Hoje é dia de Maria (English title: Today is Mary's day), a short TV series that focuses on the Brazilian magical folklore, directed by Luiz Fernando Carvalho.

== Movies ==
She plays the dedicated mother in Lavoura Arcaica (To the left of the father) (2001), directed by Luiz Fernando Carvalho, based on the novel by Raduan Nassar. Her most recent movie is O Veneno da Madrugada (2004), directed by Ruy Guerra, based on the novel by Gabriel García Márquez.
