= Curva de Vento =

Curva de vento

Studio album by Rivotrill
- Released: January 25, 2008
- Recorded: March 2007
- Genre: Instrumental music, Progressive rock, Jazz, Brazilian rhythms
- Length: 43:13
- Producer: Yuri Queiroga, Rivotrill

Curva de vento is the debut album of the Brazilian instrumental band Rivotrill. Released in 2008, all the album was recorded inside a house in Itamaracá, Pernambuco, and counted on the participation of other artists, such as Naná Vasconcelos and Maestro Spok. The songs of the album mix Brazilian, Caribbean and African rhythms, progressive rock and jazz.

== Album recording ==
Curva de vento was recorded inside an old house in Itamaracá, Pernambuco, which belongs to a friend of the group members. The band and its technical staff spread microphones around the whole house and each group member decided where he preferred to play (bedroom, bathroom etc.). This way, the musicians could find the best tones for their instruments.

The recording period took around ten days. After recorded all the instruments, the songs were mixed in a musical studio. However, this phase took much more time and the album was only released in the beginning of 2008.

== Releasing show ==
Curva de vento's releasing show happened on January 25, 2008. The group performed in Santa Isabel Theatre, Recife, Pernambuco, for more than 700 people, above the capacity of the place. The show last more than two hours and the band was much acclaimed for the public, which considered the songs of the band an excellent fusion of Brazilian rhythms, rock and roll and jazz.

== Track listing ==
#	Title	Songwriters	Length
1.	"A casa"	Junior Crato, Rafa Duarte	3:36
2.	"Chuva verde"	Junior Crato	5:12
3.	"Pirangueiro"	Yuri Queiroga	1:00
4.	"Alaursa quer farinha"	Junior Crato	4:06
5.	"Cangote"	Junior Crato, Rafa Duarte	5:28
6.	"Groove tube"	Junior Crato, Rafa Duarte	4:51
7.	"Curva de vento"	Junior Crato	4:19
8.	"Charo cubano"	Rafa Duarte	2:30
9.	"Espinho de mandacaru"	Junior Crato	5:32
10.	"A floresta e o duende"	Junior Crato, Rafa Duarte	6:35

== Personnel ==
- Junior Crato: vocals (in "Alaursa quer farinha" and "Groove tube"), flute, saxophone
- Rafa Duarte: vocals (in "Alaursa quer farinha" and "Grove tube"), bass
- Lucas dos Prazeres: vocals (in "Alaursa quer farinha"), percussion
- Yuri Queiroga: vocals (in "Alaursa quer farinha"), sound effects (in "Pirangueiro")
- Breno Martis Rêgo: vocals (in "Alaursa quer farinha")
- Serginho: vocals (in "Alaursa quer farinha")

Special Guests:

- Naná Vasconcelos: tambour, vocals and sound effects (all in "Groove tube")
- Spok: saxophone (in "Cangote")
- Fabinho Costa: trumpet (in "Charo cubano")
- Renata Rosa: vocals (in "Espinho de mandacaru")
