= Lagoa Rasa (quilombo) =

Quilombola Community in Paraíba, Brazil

Coordinates: 6°18′57″S 37°39′58″W

Lagoa Rasa is a quilombola community located in the city of Catolé do Rocha, in the state of Paraíba, Brazil, where its main source of income is subsistence agriculture, such as corn and beans, and the manufacture of handicrafts on terraces and hammocks.

The territory managed by the Quilombola Community Association of Lagoa Rasa was certified as a quilombo remnant (historical remnants of former quilombos) in 2006, by the Palmares Cultural Foundation. This community has not yet had a Technical Identification and Delimitation Report published (land regularization stage).

== Listing ==
The listing of quilombos is provided for by the Brazilian Constitution of 1988, and certification by the Fundação Cultural Palmares is sufficient:

Art. 216. Brazilian cultural heritage constitutes assets of a material and immaterial nature, taken individually or together, bearing references to the identity, actions, memory of the different groups forming Brazilian society [...] § 5 All are listed documents and sites holding historical reminiscences of the former quilombos.

== Territorial situation ==
The lack of land title (land tenure regularization) creates difficulties for the community in developing agriculture, in addition to conflicts with farmers and land grabbers in the region. The claim to ethnic territories also allows access to some important public policies.

Traditional Peoples or Traditional Communities are groups that have a culture different from the local predominant culture, which maintain a way of life closely linked to the natural environment in which they live. Through its own forms: social organization, use of territory and natural resources (with a relationship to subsistence ), its socio-cultural-religious reproduction uses knowledge transmitted orally and in everyday practice.
