= Teuda Bara =

Brazilian actress (1941–2025)

- Born: Teuda Magalhães Fernandes; 1 January 1941; Belo Horizonte, Minas Gerais, Brazil
- Died: 25 December 2025 (aged 84); Belo Horizonte, Minas Gerais, Brazil
- Occupation: Actress

Teuda Magalhães Fernandes (1 January 1941 – 25 December 2025), better known by the stage name Teuda Bara, was a Brazilian actress, one of the founders of the theater company Grupo Galpão.

== Life and career ==
Teuda Magalhães Fernandes was born in Belo Horizonte on 1 January 1941. Her father was a fire department major and trombone player, and her mother a nurse and singer; she never attended any formal theater training. She studied Social Sciences at the Federal University of Minas Gerais, where she participated in newspaper theater practices with the academic directorate of the Faculty of Philosophy and Human Sciences. In the 1960s, she left university and embraced the hippie lifestyle.

She worked with director Eid Ribeiro and founded the Fulias Bananas group. He moved to São Paulo, where he acted with José Celso Martinez Correa. In 1982, back in Belo Horizonte, she joined a theater workshop directed by two members of the Freies Theater München, George Froscher and Kurt Bildstein, which would become the seed of Grupo Galpão .

In addition to performing in most of the Galpão's shows, she participated in the Cirque du Soleil show K.A. and acted in films such as O Menino Maluquinho, by Helvécio Ratton, Vinho de Rosas, by Elza Cataldo, O Contador de Histórias, by Luiz Villaça, and O Palhaço, by Selton Mello.

Bara died from complications of septicaemia in Belo Horizonte, on 25 December 2025, at the age of 84. The actress had been hospitalized since 14 December, at the Madre Tereza Hospital.

== Filmography ==
=== Television ===
Year	Title	Character	Notes
2017	Filhos da Pátria	Cigana	
2017	A Vila	Dona Fausta	
2014	Meu Pedacinho de Chão	Mãe Benta	
2008	Toma Lá, Dá Cá	Dona Juba	Episode: "Uma epidemia politicamente correta"

=== Cinema ===
Year	Title	Character
2025	Quem Ficou Fui Eu	Helenir
2024	Nação Comprimido	Francisca
2023	As Órfãs da Rainha	Donana
2023	Peixe Abissal	Dona Luzia
2022	Febre	Mulher na piscina
2021	Noites de Alface	Iolanda
2020	Éramos em Bando	Ela mesma
2019	Ângela	Ângela
2017	As Duas Irenes	Madalena
2017	As Formigas	Cassandra
2015	Hipócrates	Paciente
2013	Abrigo ao Sol	Mulher
2011	O Palhaço	Dona Zaira
2011	Till - A Saga de um Herói Torto	—N/a
2010	Ponto Org	D. Zilda
2010	Transeunte	Metilene
2010	Revertere Ad Locum Tuum	—N/a
2009	O Contador de Histórias	Judith
2008	Os Filmes que Não Fiz	Beata
2007	O Crime da Atriz	Atriz da trupe
2005	Vinho de Rosas	Irmã Arcanja
2004	Irreconhecível	—N/a
2002	Samba Canção	Dona Martírio
1999	Outras Estórias	—N/a
1994	Menino Maluquinho - O Filme	Servente da escola
1985	Ela e os Homens	—N/a
1984	Dois Homens para Matar	Prostituta
1983	Idolatrada	—N/a

== Stage ==
- 1975 – Bar e Café São Tomé, Criação Coletiva
- 1976 – Viva Olegário, directed by Eid Ribeiro
- 1977 – Triptolemo XVII - José Antônio de Souza, directed by Adir Assunção
- 1978 – A Conquista do Dia - Criação Coletiva, directed by Carlos Rocha
- 1979 – Ensaio Geral do Carnaval do Povo, directed by José Celso Martinez Corrêa
- 1979 – Corre Terra - Teatro de Bonecos
- 1983 – De Olhos Fechados, de João Vianney, directed byFernando Linares
- 1984 – Ó Prô Cê Vê na Ponta do Pé - Criação Coletiva
- 1984 – O Agiota, directed by Eduardo Rodrigues
- 1985 – Arlequim, Servidor de Dois Amores, de Carlo Goldoni, directed by Fernando Linares e Eduardo Moreira
- 1986 – A Comédia da Esposa Muda que Falava mais que Pobre na Chuva, direção de Paulinho Polika
- 1986 – Triunfo, Um Delírio Barroco, directed by Carmen Paternostro
- 1987 – Foi Por Amor, roteiro de Antônio Edson Soares e Eduardo Moreira, directed by Antônio Edson Soares
- 1988 – Corra Enquanto é Tempo, written and directed by Eid Ribeiro
- 1990 – Álbum de Família, de Nelson Rodrigues, directed de Eid Ribeiro
- 1992 – Romeu e Julieta, directed by Gabriel Villela
- 1994 – A Rua da Amargura, directed by Gabriel Villela
- 1994 – Um Molière Imaginário, directed by Eduardo Moreira
- 1999 – Partido, directed by Cacá Carvalho
- 2001 – Um Trem Chamado Desejo, directed by Chico Pelúcio
- 2003 – O Inspetor Geral, directed by Paulo José
- 2009 – Till, a Saga de um Herói Torto, directed by Júlio Maciel

== Awards and nominations ==
Year	Award	Category	Nominanted by	Result
1996	Prêmio Shell de Teatro	Best Actress	Rua da Amargura	Nominated
2013	Festival de Cinema de Santa Rosa	Best Actress	Abrigo ao Sol	Nominated
2013	Festival de Cinema de Maringá	Best Actress	Abrigo ao Sol	Won
2013	8° Encontro Nacional de Cinema e Vídeo dos Sertões	Best Actress	Abrigo ao Sol	Won
2013	Prêmio MuBe Vitrine Independente	Special acting prize	Abrigo ao Sol	Won
2014	FECIN – Festival de TV e Cinema do Interior	Best Actress	Abrigo ao Sol	Won
2016	Prêmio Cenym de Teatro	Best Supporting Actress	Nós	Nominated
2017	Prêmio Questão de Crítica	Homage to Culture Award	Nós	Won
2019	Prêmio Cenym de Teatro	Special Honorary Prize		Won
2019	Prêmio Claudia	Culture	Contribuição c/ Cultura	Nominated
2019	Festival Internacional de Cinema de Brasília	Best Actress in a Short Film	Ângela	Won

== Bibliography ==
- Santos, João (2016). Teuda Bara: comunista demais para ser chacrete. Javali. p. 237. ISBN 9788558760010.
