= Alvacir Raposo =

Brazilian physician and writer (born 1950)

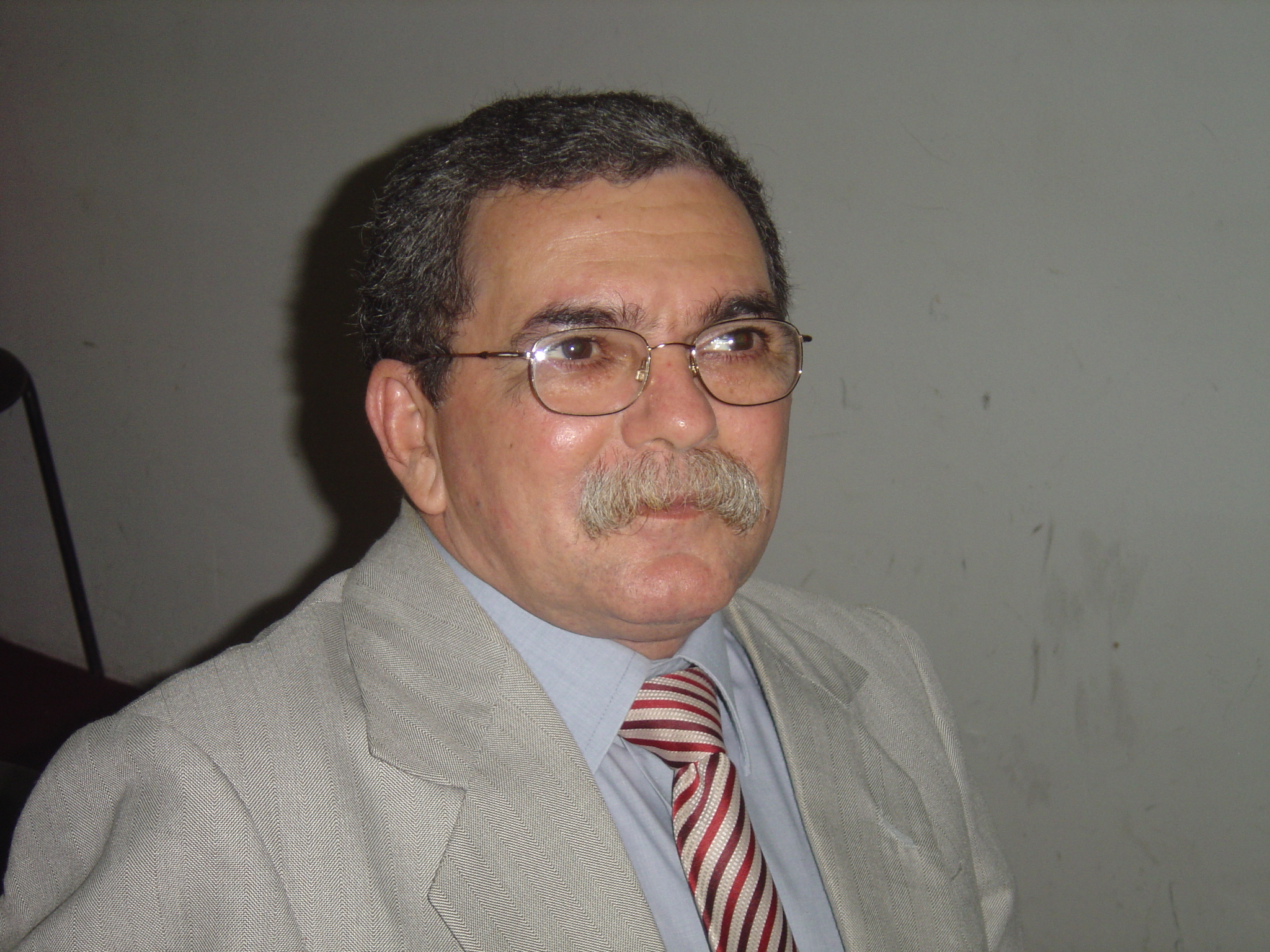
Alvacir dos Santos Raposo Filho

Alvacir dos Santos Raposo Filho (born January 18, 1950) is a Brazilian physician and writer.

Born in Piauí, Brazil, Raposo moved as a young man to Recife, Pernambuco. He graduated from the Federal University of Pernambuco (UFPE) in 1974 with a doctorate in Ophthalmology.

Raposo is a professor at UFPE and the Faculty of Medical Sciences of the University of Pernambuco. He is a poet, and composer of frevos, having recorded a CD of gender to another physician and composer Luiz Guimaraes.

== Professional training ==
- Medical (UFPE);
- Master of Ophthalmology (UFPE), with a dissertation on Retinal haemorrhages in newborns;
- Doctor of Medicine (Universidade Federal de São Paulo), with a thesis on Variations of intraocular pressure in individuals undergoing testing stationary bike.

== Books published ==
- A resistência e a Natividade. Recife: Fundarpe, 1994
- A casa do vinho. Recife: Fundarpe, 1994
- O galo de metal. Recife: Bagaço, 1995
- Rua dos Arcos. Recife: Bagaço, 1996
- O discurso do rei. Recife: Fundação de Cultura Cidade do Recife, 1996
- Sonetos. Recife: Bagaço, 1999
- O território. Recife: Bagaço, 1999
- Os tambores. Recife: Bagaço, 1999
- O pássaro e a arca. Recife: Bagaço, 2001
- Ensaio das lâminas. Recife, 2003
- A chama intacta. Recife: Bagaço, 2008
- A rosa em chamas. Recife: Bagaço, 2012
- A flauta de vidro. Recife: Bagaço, 2014

== Discography ==
- Carnaval 2000 - CD frevo jointly with the medical composer Luiz Guimaraes.

== Awards ==
- Mauro Mota Prize for Poetry, FUNDARPE, 1992
- Mauro Mota Prize for Poetry, FUNDARPE, 1993
- Poetry Prize from the Academy of Arts Pernambuco, 1993
- Award Ladjane Flag, Diário de Pernambuco, 1994
- Award Eugenio Coimbra Junior, City Council Culture of Recife, 1995
- Poetry Prize from the Academy of Arts Pernambuco, 1996

== Member of literary institutions ==
- Academia Pernambucana de Letras - elected and installed in 2002
- Academia de Letras e Artes do Nordeste - having exercised its presidency
- Sociedade Brasileira de Médicos Escritores (SOBRAMES-PE) - Socio-holder
  - Secretary for the biennium 1990-1991
  - President in 1992-1993
- Academia Recifense de Letras
- Academia Piauiense de Letras (honorary member)

== Bibliography ==
- Google-books - A poesia da Geração 65
