= Spoladore =

Spoladore is a surname. Notable people with the surname include:

- Lorena Salvatini Spoladore (born 1995), Brazilian Paralympic athlete
- Simone Spoladore (born 1979), Brazilian actress
