= Auto da Compadecida =

Auto da Compadecida is a play written by Ariano Suassuna, published in 1955. Its first production was in 1956 in Recife, Pernambuco.

Auto da Compadecida is a comedy of northeast Brazil. It combines elements of the tradition of popular literature known as cordel, a striking feature of the Brazilian Catholic baroque, mixing popular culture and religious tradition. It is very important in Brazilian culture.

== Characters ==
- The clown – the clown acts as the play host, since it is a pantomime; he comes in and out of scene, talking with the audience.
- João Grilo – a poor con man, always getting himself in trouble. He works for the baker and is Chicó's best friend.
- Chicó – a coward and a liar, he also works for the baker and is João's best friend.
- The baker – a greedy man, owner of the bakery and president of the Brotherhood of Souls. His wife constantly cheats him.
- The baker's wife – an adulterous wife that claims to be a saint. She is also greedy and a pet lover.
- Father João – the racist and greedy head priest of the local parish.
- Bishop – just like the priest, he is very greedy, and keeps badmouthing his colleague, the friar.
- Friar – an honest, kindhearted man. He does not know he is badmouthed by the bishop.
- Sacristan – a conservative and wary man.
- Major Antônio Morais – Antônio Noronha de Brito Morais is an arrogant and authoritarian major and farmer. The richest and most powerful man in the region, he uses his power to scare the poorer.
- Severino – Severino de Aracaju is a cangaceiro, a common type of outlaw in the northeast of Brazil during the late 19th century. He found in banditry means of survival after his parents were killed by the police.
- Cangaceiro or Cabra – one of Severino's henchmen. He tries to please his boss, whom he idolizes, as well as he can.
- The Compassionate Lady – Our Lady of Aparecida, the patroness of Brazil. Good and kind, she intercedes for all during the final judgment.
- Manuel – short for Immanuel, he is Jesus Christ, also the judge, judging with wisdom and impartiality, but also with mercy. He is described as having dark skin, causing surprising some of the characters.
- Encourado – the devil incarnate, he keeps imitating Manuel, demanding reverence wherever he goes. He is the trial's merciless prosecutor and wants to take all characters to hell.
- Demon – the Encourado's servant. He always tries to please his master but is often despised by him.

== Film and television adaptations ==
The play has been performed and adapted several times since its first production:

- A Compadecida (1969 film)
- Os Trapalhões no Auto da Compadecida (1987 film)
- Auto da Compadecida (1999 miniseries)
- O Auto da Compadecida (2000 film)
- O Auto da Compadecida 2 (2024 film)

== Guel Arraes' Adaptation ==
In 1999, Brazilian director Guel Arraes directed a 4-part mini-series adaptation of the play. The production received a theatrical release in 2000. Matheus Nachtergaele and Selton Mello played the roles of João Grilo and Chicó respectively.

Arraes' adaptation had small differences from the original work. Characters like the clown, the friar, the sacristan and the demon were omitted. The baker and his wife received names, Eurico (Diogo Vilella) and Dora (Denise Fraga). The son of Major Antônio Morais (Paulo Goulart), only mentioned as being very sick and mistaken by the baker's dog, was turned into a daughter, Rosinha (Virginia Cavendish), who eventually becomes Chicó's love interest. Two characters were created for the series and movie: Cabo Setenta (Aramis Trindade), commander of the military detachment sent to secure Taperoá after the first raid by Severino de Aracaju (Marco Nanini); and Vicentão (Bruno Garcia), the local bully. These last two characters contend with Chicó for Rosinha's love, but ultimately are outsmarted by him.

Other actors include Rogerio Cardoso as Father João, Lima Duarte as the Bishop, Enrique Díaz as Severino's henchman, Luís Melo as the Devil, Maurício Gonçalves as Manuel, and Academy Awards nominee for Best Actress Fernanda Montenegro as the Compassionate Lady.

Both the series and the film received critical praise, and the movie was a box office success, becoming the most watched film in the country in 2000.

A sequel, O Auto da Compadecida 2, is set to be released on Christmas day of 2024, directed once again by Guel Arraes, with Matheus Nachtergaele, Selton Mello, Virginia Cavendish, and Enrique Díaz reprising their roles, and with addition of Taís Araújo, Fabíula Nascimento, Humberto Martins, and Juliano Cazarré to the cast.
