= December (2008 film) =

2008 drama film directed by Selton Mello

- Directed by: Selton Mello
- Written by: Selton Mello; Marcelo Vindicato
- Produced by: Vânia Catani
- Starring: Leonardo Medeiros; Darlene Glória; Graziella Moretto; Paulo Guarnieri; Lúcio Mauro
- Cinematography: Lula Carvalho
- Edited by: Selton Mello; Marilia Moraes
- Music by: George Saldanha
- Production companies: Bananeira Filmes; Mondo Cane Filmes
- Release date: 21 October 2008
- Running time: 100 minutes
- Country: Brazil
- Language: Portuguese
- Budget: R$2.4 million
- Box office: R$197,197

December (Portuguese: Feliz Natal) is a 2008 Brazilian drama film and directoral debut of Selton Mello. Shot in Rio de Janeiro, it stars Leonardo Medeiros, Darlene Glória, Graziella Moretto, Paulo Guarnieri, and Lúcio Mauro.

== Plot ==
Caio (Leonardo Medeiros) travels to his hometown to visit his family on Christmas Eve. At the reunion, he must deal with past memories.

From start, the film exposes a structural functioning: it is an example of a "performance cinema".

== Cast ==
- Leonardo Medeiros as Caio
- Darlene Glória as Mérci
- Graziella Moretto as Fabiana
- Paulo Guarnieri as Theo
- Lúcio Mauro as Miguel
- Fabricio Reis as Bruno
- Thelmo Fernandes as Neto
- Cláudio Mendes as Thales
- Daniel Torres as Vitor
- Rose Abdallah as Célia
- Lucas Guarnieri as Thiago
- Liz Maggini Seraphin as Bia
- Hossein Minussi as Alex
- Emiliano Queiroz as Zé do Caixão
- Nathalia Dill as Marília

== See also ==
- List of Christmas films
