= Ariano Suassuna =

Brazilian playwright (1927–2014)

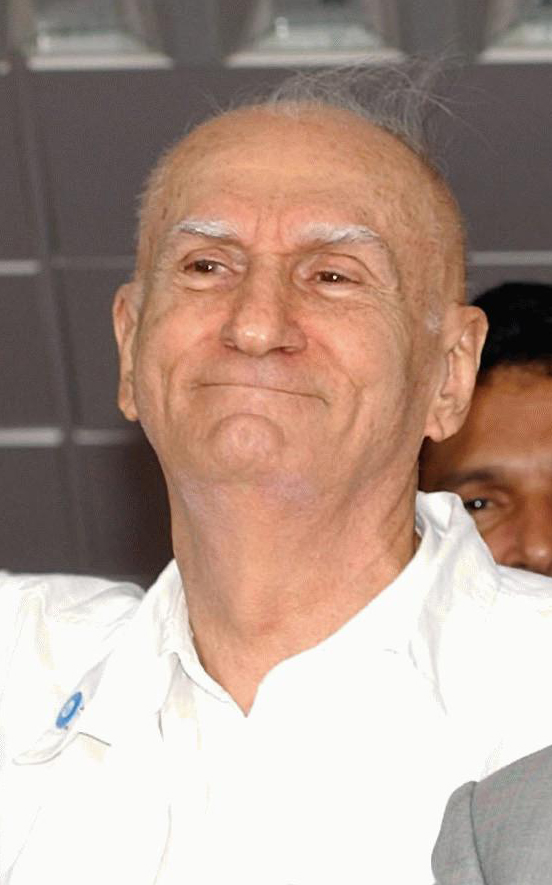
- Suassuna in 2003
- Born: 16 June 1927; Parahyba do Norte (modern-day João Pessoa), Paraíba, Brazil
- Died: 23 July 2014 (aged 87); Recife, Pernambuco, Brazil
- Education: Recife Law School
- Occupation: Writer
- Spouse: Zélia de Andrade Lima
- Children: 6
- Father: João Suassuna

Ariano Vilar Suassuna (Brazilian Portuguese pronunciation: [aɾiˈɐnu viˈlaʁ su.aˈsunɐ]; 16 June 1927 – 23 July 2014) was a Brazilian playwright and author. He was the driving force behind the creation of the Movimento Armorial. He founded the Student Theater at Federal University of Pernambuco. Four of his plays have been filmed, and he was considered one of Brazil's greatest living playwrights of his time. He was also an important regional writer, doing various novels set in the Northeast of Brazil. He received an honorary doctorate at a ceremony performed at a circus. He was the author of, among other works, the Auto da Compadecida and A Pedra do Reino. He was a staunch defender of the culture of the Northeast, and his works dealt with the popular culture of the Northeast.

== Biography ==
Ariano Vilar Suassuna was born in the northeastern city of Nossa Senhora das Neves (now João Pessoa capital of the state of Paraíba), on June 16, 1927, son of João Suassuna and Cassia Villar Suassuna. The following year, his father left the government of Paraíba and the family went to live in the wilderness, in Acauhan Farm ("Fazenda Acauã").

During the Revolution of 1930, his father was murdered for political reasons in Rio de Janeiro and the family moved to Taperoá, Paraíba, where he lived from 1933 to 1937. In this city, Ariano began his first studies and also watched for the first time mamulengos (kind of theatric plays played by hand puppets that were typical to the region) and a Viola Challenge, whose character of "improvisation" was one of the hallmarks of his theatrical production.

From 1942 he lived in Recife, where he finished in 1945, his secondary education at the Gymnasium in Pernambuco and Osvaldo Cruz High School. The following year he began Law School, where he met Hermilo Borba Filho. And along with him, he founded the Student Theater of Pernambuco. In 1947 he wrote his first play, Uma Mulher Vestida de Sol. In 1948, his play, Cantam as Harpas de Sião (ou O Desertor de Princesa) was performed by the Student Theater of Pernambuco. Os Homens de Barro was presented the following year.

In 1950, he graduated from the Faculty of Law and was awarded the Martin Pena Award by Auto de João da Cruz. He was forced to move back to Taperoá, to be cured of lung disease. There he wrote the play and set up Torturas de um Coração in 1951. In 1952 he returned to live in Recife. Until 1956, he devoted himself to law, however, without abandoning the theater industry. During this time O Castigo da Soberba (1953), O Rico Avarento (1954) and O Auto da Compadecida (1955), were performed around the country and would be considered in 1962 by Sabato Magaldi "the text of the most popular modern Brazilian theater."

In 1956, he abandoned law to become professor of Aesthetics at the Federal University of Pernambuco (UFPE). The following year he staged his play O Casamento Suspeitoso in São Paulo, Cia Sérgio Cardoso, and O Santo e a Porca, in 1958, was staged his play O Homem da Vaca e o Poder da Fortuna, in 1959, A Pena e a Lei, awarded ten years after the Festival Latinoamericano de Teatro.

In 1959, along with Hermilo Borba Filho, he founded the Teatro Popular do Nordeste, which then set up A Farsa da Boa Preguiça (1960) and A Caseira e a Catarina (1962). In the early '60s, he interrupted his successful career as a playwright to devote to the classes in Aesthetics at UFPE. There, in 1976, defends the thesis Habilitation A Onça Castanha e a Ilha Brasil: Uma Reflexão sobre a Cultura Brasileira, Retires as professor in 1994.

Founding member of the Federal Council of Culture (1967), appointed by the Rector Murilo Guimarães, director of the Department of Cultural Extension of UFPE (1969). Directly linked to culture, began in 1970 in Recife, the "Armorial Movement", interested in the development and understanding of traditional forms of popular expression. Called names expressive music classical music to seek a northeast to come join the movement, launched in Recife, October 18, 1970, with the concert "Three Centuries of Northeastern Music – the Armorial of the Baroque" and an exhibition of printmaking, painting and sculpture. Secretary of Culture of the State of Pernambuco, Miguel Arraes Government (1994–1998).

Between 1958 and 1979, also dedicated himself to prose fiction, publishing the Romance d'A Pedra do Reino e o Príncipe do Sangue do Vai-e-Volta(1971) and História d'O Rei Degolado nas Caatingas do Sertão / Ao Sol da Onça Caetana (1976), classified by him as "armorial-popular Brazilian novel."

The music group Armorial Quintet was founded in 1970.

Ariano Suassuna built in São José do Belmonte (PE), where the ride is inspired by the Romance d'A Pedra do Reino, an outdoor sanctuary, consisting of 16 sculptures of stone, with height 3.50 m each, arranged in circle, representing the sacred and the profane. The first three are images of Jesus Christ, Our Lady and St. Joseph, the patron saint of the city.

Paraíba State Academy of Arts and Doctor Honoris Causa from the Federal University of Rio Grande do Norte (2000).

In 2002, Ariano Suassuna story was the subject of the carnival, in 2008, was again the subject of plot, this time the samba school Carnival Mancha Verde in São Paulo. In 2004, with the support of the ABL, the Kind Films produced a documentary entitled The Hinterland: World of Ariano Suassuna, directed by Douglas Machado and was exhibited at the Sala José de Alencar. In 2006, he was awarded the title of Doctor Honoris Causa from the Federal University of Ceara, but only received it on June 10, 2010, on the eve of his 83rd birthday.

On July 21, 2014, he suffered from a hemorrhagic stroke; he was hospitalized in coma and died from cardiac arrest on July 23.

== Conversion to Roman Catholicism ==
Ariano Suassuna was born in a Calvinist Protestant family, became agnostic and converted to Roman Catholicism in 1958.

== Plays ==
- O Auto da Compadecida (1955)
- O Castigo da Soberba (1960)
- O Casamento Suspeitoso (1961)
- A Caseira e a Catarina (1962)
- Uma Mulher Vestida de Sol (1964)
- O Rico Avarento (1964)
- O Santo e a Porca (1964)
- Pena e a Lei (1974)
- A Farsa da Boa Preguiça (1982)

== Novels ==
- A Pedra do Reino e o Príncipe do Sangue do Vai-e-Volta, 1971.
- História d'O Rei Degolado nas caatingas do sertão: ao sol da Onça Caetana, 1977.

== Critical study ==
- Ariano Suassuna : um perfil biográfico, Adriana Victor, Juliana Lins. Rio de Janeiro: Zahar, c. 2007. ISBN 978-85-7110-989-6
