= Antonio Nóbrega =

Brazilian singer, dancer and actor (born 1952)

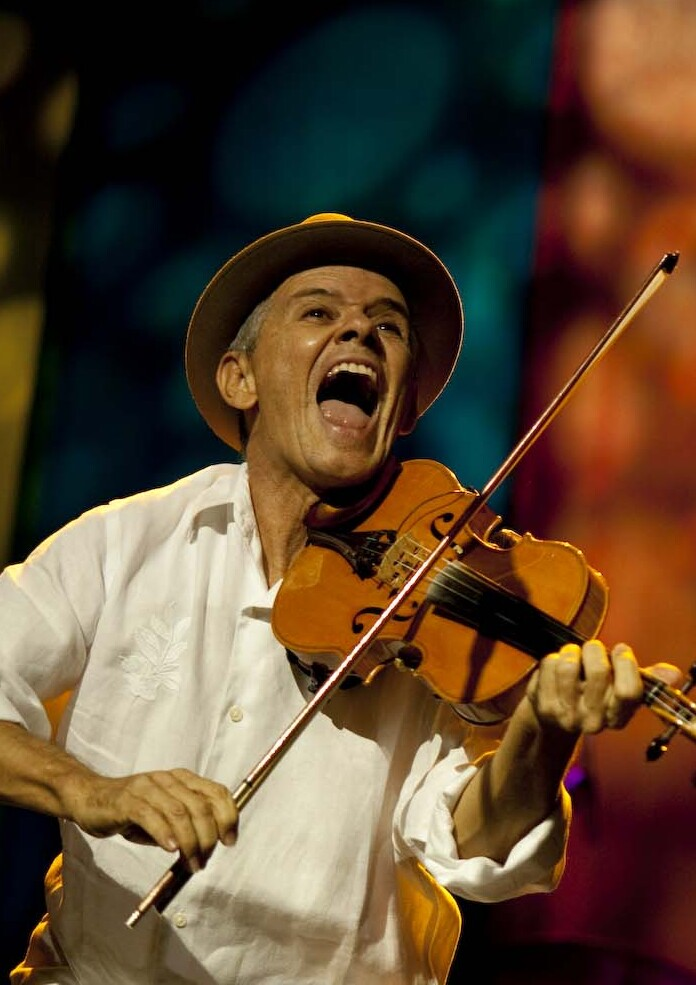
- Antônio Nóbrega, 2010.

Background information
- Born: Antonio Carlos Nóbrega; May 2, 1952 (age 74)
- Origin: Recife, Pernambuco, Brazil
- Genres: frevo, maracatu, classical music
- Occupations: Singer, dancer, actor
- Instruments: Voice, violin, rebec
- Years active: 1965–present
- Labels: Brincante, Eldorado
- Website: http://www.antonionobrega.com.br/

Antonio Nóbrega (born May 2, 1952) is a Brazilian singer, dancer and actor whose work features cultural traditions from Pernambuco.

== Biography ==
Antonio Nóbrega was born in 1952, in Recife, Pernambuco, Brazil. His father was a doctor and he studied in a Catholic school, Colégio Marista. When he was 12, he started studying music in Escola de Belas Artes do Recife, where he learned how to sing and play violin.

In the 1960s, he became musician for Orquestra de Câmara da Paraíba and Orquestra Sinfônica do Recife. As member of those orchestras, Nóbrega started his musical career. In the 1970s, he joined Quinteto Armorial, a musical group idealized by Ariano Suassuna for creating classical chamber music from Brazilian folklore roots. The group travelled abroad and recorded four albums.

In 1976, he started his solo career. Thereafter, his works mixed music, theatre and dance and contributed to make him famous and prominent. However, he only became famous in all the country in the 1990s, after three shows: "Figural", "Brincante" and "Segundas histórias", starring his character Tonheta, which is a mix of clown and vagabond that tries to captivate people.

In 1983, Nóbrega moved to São Paulo and, as a music and dance researcher, he contributed to create Departamento de Artes Corporais, in Unicamp.

During his career, Nóbrega won several awards. In 1994 and 1996, he won Prêmio Shell and Troféu Mambembe, respectively, for his contributions to art. In 1996, he received the Sharp Awards for Best Song in regional category due to "Na pancada do ganzá". He also won I Prêmio Multicultural Estadão, in 1997.

== Discography ==
- 1996: Na pancada do ganzá
- 1997: Madeira que cupim não rói
- 1998: Pernambuco falando para o mundo
- 2001: O marco do meio-dia
- 2002: Lunário perpétuo
- 2005: Nove de frevereiro
- 2007: Nove de frevereiro, volume 2
