= The Movie of My Life =

2017 film directed by Selton Mello

- Theatrical release poster
- Portuguese: O Filme da Minha Vida
- Directed by: Selton Mello
- Screenplay by: Selton Mello; Marcelo Vindicatto
- Based on: Un padre de película by Antonio Skármeta
- Produced by: Vânia Catani
- Starring: Selton Mello; Bruna Linzmeyer; Johnny Massaro; Bia Arantes; Vincent Cassel
- Cinematography: Walter Carvalho
- Edited by: Marcio Hashimoto
- Production companies: Bananeira Filmes; Mondo Cane Filmes; Globo Filmes; Orion Pictures
- Distributed by: Vitrine Filmes
- Release date: August 3, 2017 (Brazil)
- Running time: 113 minutes
- Country: Brazil
- Language: Portuguese
- Box office: $1.1 million

The Movie of My Life (Portuguese: O Filme da Minha Vida) is a 2017 Brazilian film written and directed by Selton Mello, who also stars in the film. It is based on the 2010 novel Un padre de película by Chilean writer Antonio Skármeta. Besides Mello, the film also stars Bruna Linzmeyer, Johnny Massaro, Bia Arantes and Vincent Cassel.
