= O Contador de Histórias =

2009 film directed by Luiz Villaça

- Theatrical release poster
- Directed by: Luiz Villaça
- Written by: Maurício Arruda; José Roberto Torero; Mariana Veríssimo; Luiz Villaça
- Produced by: Francisco Ramalho, Jr. Denise Fraga
- Starring: Maria de Medeiros; Daniel Henrique; Paulinho Mendes
- Cinematography: Lauro Escorel
- Edited by: Umberto Martins; Maria Altberg
- Music by: André Abujamra; Márcio Nigro
- Production company: Ramalho Filmes
- Distributed by: Warner Bros. Pictures
- Release date: 7 September 2009 (Brazil)
- Running time: 110 minutes
- Country: Brazil
- Language: Portuguese

O Contador de Histórias (The Story of Me or (Australian title) The Storyteller) is a 2009 Brazilian film directed by Luiz Villaça, based on the life of Roberto Carlos Ramos, a Brazilian teacher and storyteller brought up in a state educational institution for poor children.

== Plot ==
Roberto, an imaginative 6-year-old and the youngest of ten brothers in an impoverished family, is consigned by his mother to a newly founded government institution. The goal of educating poor youngsters to university level is not matched by the facilities, and the unhappy Roberto repeatedly tries to escape and is brought back. A French social-work researcher, Margherit, makes the boy, who is now aged 13 and on the way to a life of crime, a subject of study. After many tribulations, she gets closer to him and shows how love and care can make a difference. She teaches him to read and introduces works of Jules Verne which refire his imagination and launch him on a successful career of teaching and public oratory.

== Cast ==
- Maria de Medeiros as Margherit
- Daniel Henrique as 6-year-old Roberto
- Paulinho Mendes as 13-year-old Roberto
- Cleiton Santos as adult Roberto
- Malu Galli as Pérola
- Ju Colombo as Roberto's mother
- Daniel Henrique da Silva as 6-year-old Samuel
- Ricardo Perpétuo as 13-year-old Samuel
- Matheus de Freitas as 13-year-old Cabelinho de Fogo
- Victor Augusto da Silva as 17-year-old Cabelinho de Fogo
- Teuda Bara as Judith
- Chico Díaz as camelô
- Jacqueline Obrigon as psychologist

== Reception ==
In 2009, adjudged Best Film (Audience Choice), Critics’ Special Prize and Best Actor at Paulínia Festival; Lente de Cristal Award at Cine Fest Brasil, Madrid. Also screened at Vienna International Children's Festival, 2010 Brazilian Film Festival of London; Brazilian Film Festival in Miami.
