= Southwest (film) =

2012 film

- Film poster
- Directed by: Eduardo Nunes
- Produced by: Helder Dacosta
- Starring: Simone Spoladore
- Cinematography: Mauro Pinheiro Jr.
- Release date: 29 January 2012 (Rotterdam)
- Running time: 128 minutes
- Country: Brazil
- Language: Portuguese

Southwest (Portuguese: Sudoeste) is a 2012 Brazilian drama film directed by Eduardo Nunes.

== Cast ==
- Simone Spoladore as Clarisse
- Dira Paes
