= Spok =

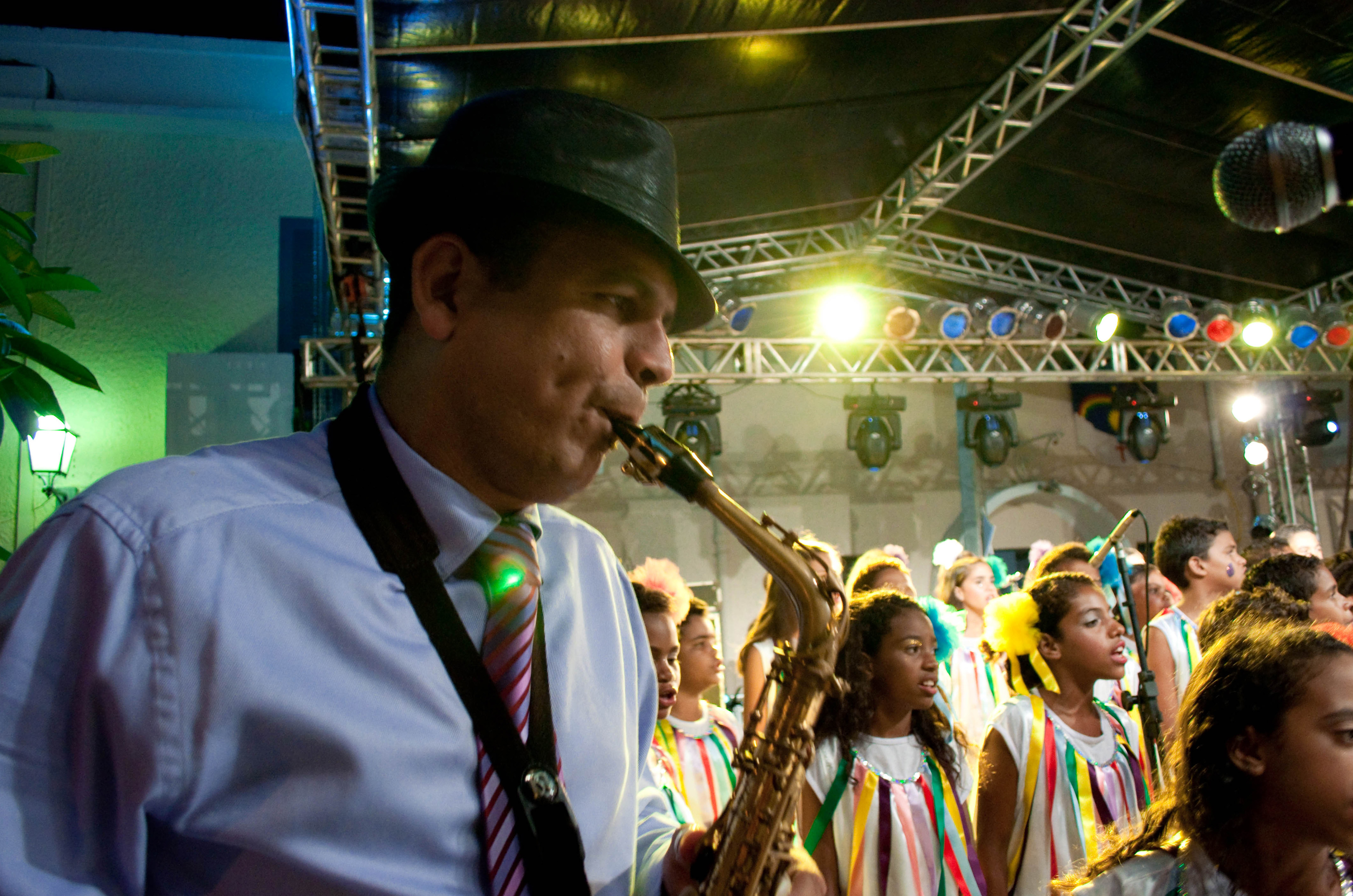

Background information
- Also known as: Maestro Spok
- Born: Inaldo Cavalcante de Albuquerque
- Origin: Igarassu, Pernambuco, Brazil
- Genres: Frevo, jazz
- Occupations: Musician, composer, conductor
- Instrument: Saxophone
- Years active: 1984-present
- Label: Biscoito Fino

Inaldo Cavalcante de Albuquerque, better known as Spok or Maestro Spok, is a Brazilian sax player who is one of the main frevo composers in the state of Pernambuco. His big band, SpokFrevo Orquestra, composed of 18 musicians, is considered one of the most important frevo groups in the city of Recife. It has performed in many countries of the world, spreading the frevo rhythm. Spok has played with many other Brazilian artists, such as Raimundo Fagner, Alceu Valença, Antonio Nóbrega, Elba Ramalho, Geraldo Azevedo, Sivuca, Naná Vasconcelos and Rivotrill. Spok has been called the new frevo ambassador for his contributions to the development and spread of the frevo rhythm.

== Biography ==
Inaldo Cavalcante de Albuquerque was born in Igarassu, Pernambuco, Brazil. However, he lived in Abreu e Lima for most of his childhood, and began his musical studies there in 1984. Two years later, in 1986, he moved to Recife, where he worked with the greatest conductors and composers of Pernambuco of the day, such as Maestro Ademir Araújo, Maestro Clóvis Pereira and Maestro Guedes Peixotos.

In Recife, Spok studied in Centro Profissional de Criatividade Musical do Recife, with the most eminent music teachers of the city, becoming one of the most important sax players in Recife. In 1996, he founded his big band, which is known as the SpokFrevo Orquestra. Over the course of his career, he has played with many well-known Brazilian musicians, such as Raimundo Fagner, Alceu Valença, Elba Ramalho and Antonio Nóbrega.

Since 2007, Spok has organized the closing show for the Recife Carnival, an event which usually involves a large number of musicians. In 2009, for example, his orchestra had 170 musicians. Well-known artists, such as Lenine, Alceu Valença, Claudionor Germano, Lula Queiroga, Antonio Nóbrega, Moraes Moreira, Luis Melodia, Zé Renato and Leo Gandelman, also participated in his show.

== SpokFrevo Orquestra ==
In 1996, Maestro Spok founded Banda Pernambucana, which played with Antonio Nóbrega around the world. Some years later, this group was named Orquestra de Frevo do Recife, becoming the SpokFrevo Orquestra in 2004.

In its initial years, the group played frevo songs as they were originally composed. However, bit by bit, the big band incorporated some influences from jazz, emphasizing solo improvisation and introducing rhythmic innovations. This characteristic led to many negative reviews by traditional frevo musicians. However, it also helped make the SpokFrevo Orquestra famous in Recife and around the world.

In 2004, the big band recorded its first album, named Passo de anjo ("Angel Dance"). This album was positively reviewed by experts for reinterpreting old classics and presenting new songs. In 2008, the big band recorded a DVD of its show, which was also released as CD. This work was named Passo de anjo ao vivo and contains performances by Lenine, Elba Ramalho and Zé da Flauta.

Spok Frevo Orquestra has performed in many countries of the world, such as Portugal, Italy, Netherlands, Switzerland, France and Austria, always spreading the music of Pernambuco. Their repertory includes compositions by Spok as well as Sivuca, Dori Caymmi and many other frevo composers. The band embarked on its first US tour in March 2012.

== Discography ==
- 2004: Passo de anjo
- 2008: Passo de anjo ao vivo
