= The Clown (2011 film) =

2011 film directed by Selton Mello

- Theatrical poster
- Directed by: Selton Mello
- Written by: Selton Mello; Marcelo Vindicatto
- Produced by: Vânia Catani
- Starring: Selton Mello; Paulo José; Larissa Manoela; Giselle Motta
- Cinematography: Adrian Teijido
- Edited by: Marília Moraes
- Music by: Plínio Profeta
- Production company: Bananeira Filmes
- Distributed by: Imagem Filmes
- Release dates: October 7, 2011 (Festival do Rio); October 28, 2011 (Brazil)
- Running time: 90 minutes
- Country: Brazil
- Language: Portuguese
- Budget: R$ 5 million
- Box office: R$ 13,544,617

The Clown (Portuguese: O Palhaço) is a 2011 Brazilian comedy-drama film. It is the second feature film directed by Selton Mello, who also stars as the protagonist.

The film follows the story of the father and son Benjamin and Valdemar, who work as clowns Pangaré and Puro Sangue, running the country roads together with the Circus Hope troupe. The clown Benjamin, however, is in crisis. He thinks that he is not funny anymore.

The film was selected as the Brazilian entry for the Best Foreign Language Oscar at the 85th Academy Awards, but was not nominated.

== Plot ==
The film tells the story of Benjamin and Valdemar, father and son known as the clowns Pangaré and Puro Sangue. They make their living traveling the country with Circus Hope, without a fixed address, no neighbors, and no ID.

The drama begins when Pangaré, tired of life on the road, feels that he is no longer a funny clown, awakening a lifelong dream of having a place to live and a social security number, proof of residence, and an identity card.

== Cast ==
- Paulo José as Valdemar / Puro Sangue
- Selton Mello as Benjamim / Pangaré
- Larissa Manoela as Guilhermina
- Giselle Motta as Lola
- Teuda Bara as Dona Zaira
- Álamo Facó as João Lorota
- Cadu Fávero as Tony Lo Bianco
- Erom Cordeiro as Robson Felix
- Hossen Minussi as Chico Lorota
- Maíra Chasseraux as Lara Lane
- Thogun as Gordini
- Bruna Chiaradia as Justine
- Renato Macedo as Borrachinha
- Tony Tonelada as Meio Quilo
- Fabiana Karla as Tonha
- Jorge Loredo as Nei
- Jackson Antunes as Juca Bigode
- Moacyr Franco as Delegado Justo
- Tonico Pereira as Beto / Deto Papagaio

== Production ==
The film was shot in March and April 2010; in the city of Paulínia, São Paulo, and some scenes in the district of Conceição do Ibitipoca, Lima Duarte, Minas Gerais.

Director and star of O Palhaço, Selton Mello said in an interview that the film is "a mixture of Oscarito, Didi Mocó and Bye Bye Brazil." He said the production helped him to get rid of depression. Mello showed the script to actors Wagner Moura and Rodrigo Santoro, offering them the lead role, but the schedule prevented both from accepting the invitation.

== Release ==
The film premiered on October 28, 2011 in 200 theaters throughout Brazil.

== Reception ==
=== Box office ===
In the first three days of release the film grossed R$ 2 million, reaching the milestone of 1 million viewers in the third week of screening.

=== Awards and nominations ===
São Paulo Association of Art Critics Awards

- Won: Best Director - Selton Mello

4th Festival Paulínia de Cinema

- Won: Best Director - Selton Mello
- Won: Best Script - Selton Mello and Marcelo Vindicatto
- Won: Best Supporting Actor - Moacyr Franco
- Won: Best Costume Design - Kika Lopes

== See also ==
- List of submissions to the 85th Academy Awards for Best Foreign Language Film
- List of Brazilian submissions for the Academy Award for Best Foreign Language Film
