= A Caseira e a Catarina =

1962 play written by Ariano Suassuna

- Author: Ariano Suassuna
- Language: Brazilian Portuguese
- Genre: Comedy
- Publication date: 1962 (play)
- Publication place: Brazil

A Caseira e a Catarina is a very popular Brazilian play written by Ariano Suassuna that was first published in 1962.

== Plot ==
The plot has one act. It is about a woman betrayed by her husband. Angry and in sorrow, she makes a deal with the devil and asks him to take her husband and his lover to hell.
