= Adriana Falcão =

Brazilian screenwriter

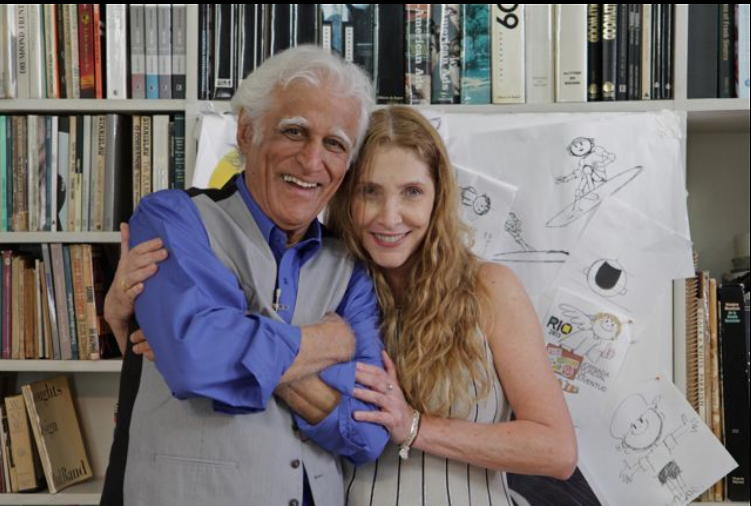
Adriana Franco de Abreu Falcão

Adriana Falcão (born in 1960 in Rio de Janeiro) is a Brazilian screenwriter.

== Life ==
Born in Rio de Janeiro but moved to Recife at 11 years old.

First her father committed suicide and later her mother too, taking a fatal dose of sleeping pills.

Graduated in architecture, but never worked in the profession.

== Works ==
Her first novel was The Machine (A máquina); as a screenwriter wrote for series such as Comedy privacy (Comédias da vida privada), A grande familia (A large family, also wrote the screenplays for the film. Currently publishes chronic in the paper O Estado de Sao Paulo.

=== Television ===
- Só Dez por Cento é Mentira (2008) - Producer
- Eu e Meu Guarda-Chuva (2010)
- Se Eu Fosse Você 2 (2009)
- A Mulher Invisível (2008)
- Chega de Saudade (2007)
- Fica Comigo Esta Noite (2006)
- Irma Vap - O Retorno (2006)
- O Ano em Que Meus Pais Saíram de Férias (2006)
- Se Eu Fosse Você (2006)
- O Auto da Compadecida

=== Screenwriter ===
- Quer Tapioca com Manteiga, Freguesa? (1985)
- A Grande Família (2001)
- O Auto da Compadecida (1999)

=== Others ===
- A Máquina (Editora Objetiva, 1999)
- Mania de Explicação (2001)
- Luna Clara & Apolo Onze (2002)
- Histórias dos tempos de escola: Memória e aprendizado (2002);
- Pequeno dicionário de palavras ao vento (2003);
- Contos de estimação (Editora Objetiva, 2003);
- A comédia dos anjos (2004);
- PS Beijei (2004);
- A tampa do céu (2005),
- Contos de escola (2005);
- O Zodíaco – Doze signos, doze histórias (2005);
- Tarja preta (Editora Objetiva, 2005)
- Sonho de uma noite de verão (Coleção Devorando Shakespeare, Editora Objetiva, 2007)
- A arte de virar a página (2009) (Editora Fontanar. Com imagens de Leonardo Miranda)
