= Rivotrill =

Brazilian band

- Origin: Recife, Pernambuco, Brazil
- Genres: Progressive rock, jazz, Brazilian music
- Years active: 2006–present
- Members: Junior Crato; Rafa Duarte; Lucas dos Prazeres
- Website: www.rivotrill.com.br

Rivotrill is a Brazilian instrumental group formed by Junior Crato (flute and saxophone), Rafa Duarte (bass) and Lucas dos Prazeres (percussion), which presents a fusion of Brazilian, Latin and African rhythms with progressive rock and jazz.

== History ==
Rivotrill started its career in 2006. The band members usually create their songs influenced by jazz, rock, particularly Jethro Tull, and Afro-Brazilian rhythms. However, they also have influences of classical music.

In 2007, the band participated of many festivals around Brazil, such as Festival Rec-Beat, Festival de Inverno de Garanhuns, Festival de Música Instrumental de Garulhos and Feira da Música de Fortaleza, and was positively criticized by press. In Festival Rec-Beat, they were considered the greatest discovery of the festival.

In 2008, the group released its first album, named Curva de vento, with collaboration of CHESF. This work counted with participation of many other artists, such as Naná Vasconcelos and Maestro Spok. The releasing show happened in Santa Isabel Theater on January 25 and counted with more than 700 people, above the capacity of the theater. In that same year, in June, it was named as finalist in Concurso Peligro/Trama Virtual.

In 2009, Vitor Araújo, a pianist from Recife, joined the band as partnership in August, in Universidade Federal de Pernambuco Theater. Vitor Araújo and Rivotrill toured Brazil and were characterized by their musical eclecticism, trying to mix classical and popular music. Between the most important shows of these musicians, one can cite Festival de Música do Mundo, realized in João Pessoa, Paraíba, Brazil.

In October of this same year, Araújo and Rivotrill performed in Auditório Ibirapuera, São Paulo. This shows was recorded and released in DVD weeks later. The show counted with participation of the musician Vinicius Sarmento.

== Discography ==
- 2008: Curva de vento
- 2009: Vitor Araújo + Rivotrill (DVD)
