= The Saint and The Sow =

The Saint and The Sow ("O Santo e a Porca", in the original title) is a very popular Brazilian play written by Ariano Suassuna that was first published in 1957. The play, according to Suassuna, is a "Northeastern imitation" of the play Aulularia (a.k.a. The Pot's Comedy), from the Roman writer Plautus.

== Plot ==
The story focuses in Eurico Árabe, who is called Euricão Engole-Cobra (something like Euricão Swallows-Snake) by his employees. Eurico is a "rich" and niggard man who has a beautiful and courteous daughter called Margarida and two employees: a smart housemaid called Caroba and his "Official Servant" Dódó, who is Margarida's secret boyfriend.

One day, a man called Pinhão (who is Caroba's secret boyfriend) arrives in Eurico's house with a letter from the rich and powerful Colonel Eudoro. It was written in the letter:

"My dear and honored Eurico: I expect you have being enjoying your peace and prosperity! Above all, I desire that your charming daughter Margarida be fine and healthy like she was in the days that she spent in my house, if you remember. I sent this letter with my loyal employee Pinhão to advise you of the visit I will make to your home soon and I fear that I will steal your most precious treasure."

Then, Eurico becomes mad thinking that Eudoro will steal his coffer (that is in the form of a pig - in this case, a sow) and tries to "stop" Eudoro's robbery. But Caroba, in a secret meeting with Margarida, Pinhão and Dodó, tells them that the "most precious treasure" in the letter referred to Margarida and that Eudoro was going to marry her. Then they make a plan to try to reconcile Eudoro with his old love, Benona. But they will have to take care about Eurico, who is trying to protect his "sow coffer".

== The Saint ==
Despite being part of the title, the saint is not important to the play. In fact, the saint is a statue of Saint Antonio, to whom Eurico prays a lot (usually asking for more money or for protection of his "sow coffer").

== The Play ==
The play is divided in three acts:

- First Act: the arrival of the letter and the elaboration of Caroba's plan to reconcile Colonel Eudoro and his old love, Benona;
- Second Act: Caroba's plan is in progress, but many unexpected events occur (usually caused by Eurico, who is trying to protect his coffer) and Caroba has to improvise her plan;
- Third Act: a huge mass is made at the end but everything ends well for everyone (except for Eurico, who discovers that he lost his "fortune" in his "sow coffer").
