= Catolé do Rocha =

- Municipality
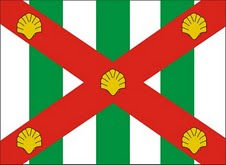
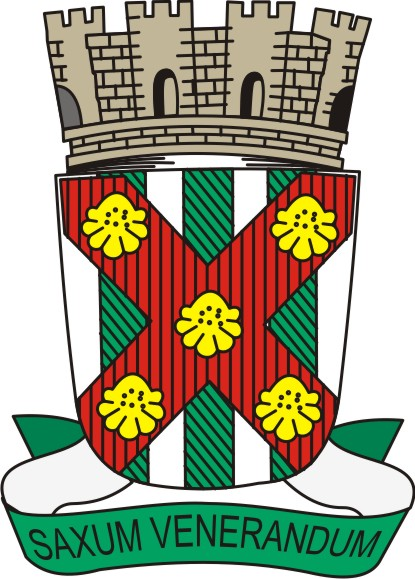
- Flag Coat of arms

- Location in Brazil
- Coordinates: 6°21′S 37°45′W
- Country: Brazil
- Region: Northeast
- State: Paraíba
- Mesoregion: Sertao Paraibana

Population (2020)
  - Total: 30,684
- Time zone: UTC−3 (BRT)

Catolé do Rocha is a municipality in the state of Paraíba in the Northeast Region of Brazil.

== See also ==
- List of municipalities in Paraíba

== Notable people ==
- João Suassuna, (1886-1930), politic, president of Paraíba
