= To the Left of the Father =

2001 film by Luiz Fernando Carvalho

- Theatrical release poster
- Directed by: Luiz Fernando Carvalho
- Written by: Luiz Fernando Carvalho
- Based on: Lavoura Arcaica by Raduan Nassar
- Produced by: Luiz Fernando Carvalho; Maurício Andrade Ramos; Donald K. Ranvaud
- Starring: Selton Mello; Raul Cortez; Juliana Carneiro da Cunha; Simone Spoladore; Leonardo Medeiros; Caio Blat
- Cinematography: Walter Carvalho
- Edited by: Luiz Fernando Carvalho
- Music by: Marco Antônio Guimarães
- Production companies: Video Filmes; LFC Produções; Raquel Couto Produções
- Distributed by: RioFilme
- Release date: 2001
- Running time: 165 minutes
- Country: Brazil
- Language: Portuguese
- Box office: R$874.018 ($372.520)

To the Left of the Father (Portuguese: Lavoura Arcaica) is a 2001 Brazilian drama film produced, written, directed and edited by Luiz Fernando Carvalho, based on the novel of the same name by Raduan Nassar. The film follows a man (Selton Mello) who returns to his father's home after many years and falls in love with his sister (Simone Spoladore). In 2015, the Brazilian Film Critics Association (Abraccine) placed To the Left of the Father among their list of 100 Greatest Brazilian Films of All Time.

== Plot summary ==
The story concerns a young man living at home, André (Selton Mello), whose ideas are radically different from those of his farmer father (Raul Cortez). The father advocates order and restraint, which enhance his own power under the guise of family love. The son seeks freedom and pleasure, exemplified in his passion for his sister Ana (Simone Spoladore). When André moves to a seedy boarding house, his older brother Pedro (Leonardo Medeiros), is asked by their mother (Juliana Carneiro da Cunha) to bring him back. His return, however, will shatter the family's insular life.

== Cast ==
- Selton Mello - André
  - Pablo César Câncio - young André
  - Luiz Fernando Carvalho - André voice (narrator)
- Raul Cortez - Father
- Juliana Carneiro da Cunha - Mother
- Simone Spoladore - Ana
- Leonardo Medeiros - Pedro
- Caio Blat - Lula
- Denise Del Vecchio - prostitute
- Samir Muci Alcici Júnior
- Leda Samara Antunes
- Felipe Abreu Salomão
- Raphaela Borges David

== Production ==
Aiming to maintain the connection with the poetic prose of Raduan Nassar's book, Luiz Fernando Carvalho elected to film without a defined script, based entirely on the actors' improvisations on the theme. This involved intensive coaching of the cast, secluded on a farm for four months. The film's creation and production process was discussed in the book About To the Left of The Father ("Sobre Lavoura Arcaica"), in which the director is interviewed by José Carlos Avellar, Geraldo Sarno, Miguel Pereira, Ivana Bentes, Arnaldo Carrilho and Liliane Heynemann, launched in Portuguese, English and French by the publisher Ateliê Editorial.

== Reception ==
It was a success with the critics and the public, reaching 300,000 viewers with just two exhibition locations, one in Rio de Janeiro and the other in São Paulo.

=== Critical response ===
It is considered one of the 100 best Brazilian films of all time, according to the Brazilian Film Critics Association (Abraccine). In the opinion of writer and psychoanalyst Renato Tardivo, author of Porvir que vem antes de tudo – literatura e cinema em Lavoura Arcaica, the film is one of the most important works of Brazilian cinema “of all times”. The critic Carlos Alberto de Mattos described it as the first work of art of the Brazilian cinema in the 21st century. The film was acclaimed by the critics of various countries and, according to the French magazine Cahiers du Cinéma, To the Left of the Father is a "barbarous poem verging on hallucination, of extraordinary power".

=== Accolades ===
It had a successful career in a number of national and international festivals, receiving over 50 awards at the Montreal World Film Festival, the Rio Film Festival, the São Paulo International Film Festival, the Grand Prix for Brazilian Film, the Brasília Film Festival, the Havana Film Festival, the Cartagena Film Festival, the Guadalajara International Film Festival, the Buenos Aires International Festival of Independent Cinema, among others.
