= Mamulengo =

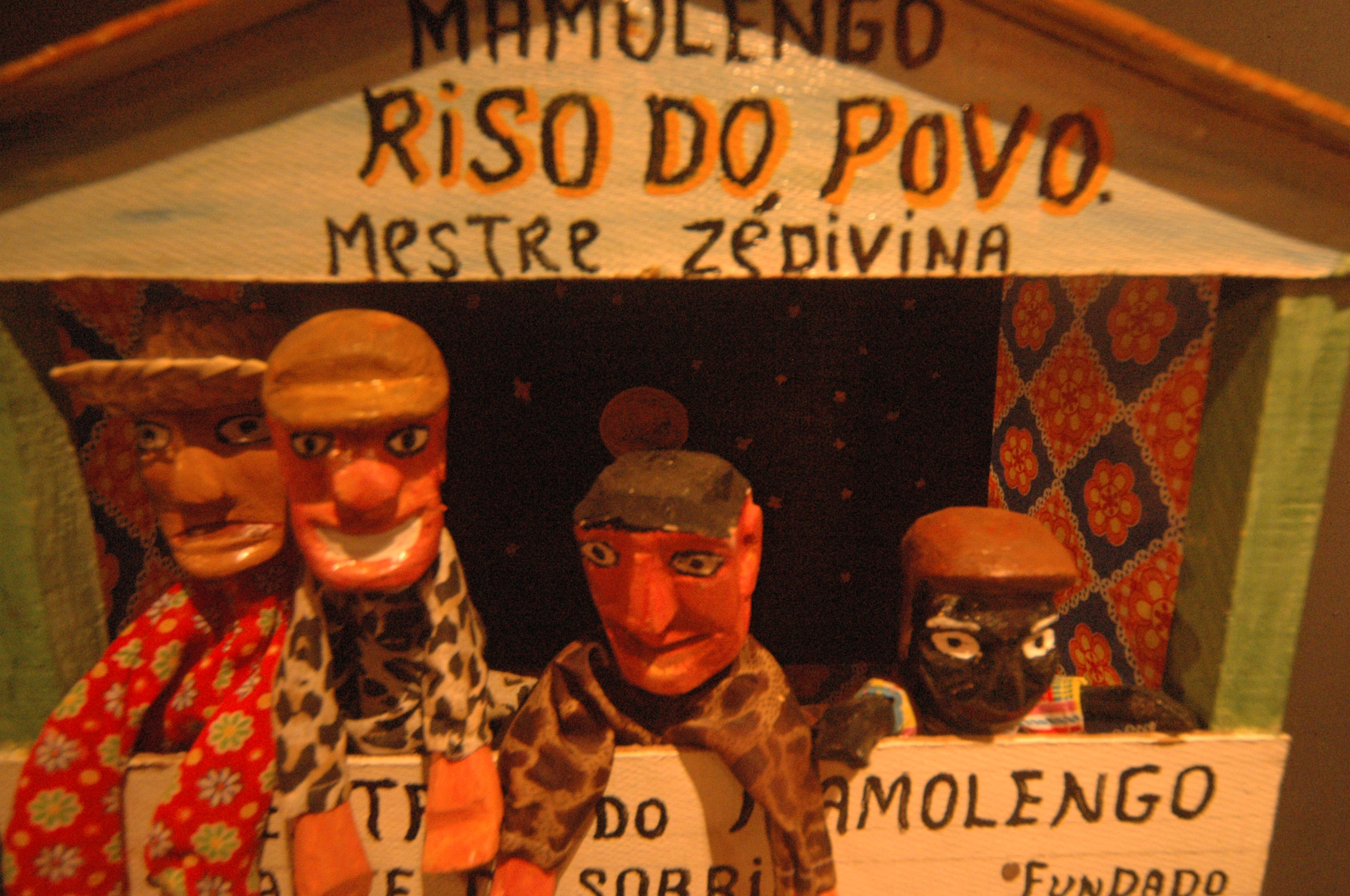
A mamulengo puppet stage and puppets.

Mamulengo is a type of puppet performance popular in North East Brazil, especially in the state of Pernambuco. The origin of the name is unclear, but it is believed that it originated with the Portuguese phrase mão molenga, meaning "soft hand", ideal for giving lively movements to a puppet.

== Origins ==
For Luís da Câmara Cascudo, the Brazilian folklorist, mamulengo is the same as the guignol puppet theatre of France, and the similar Italian pupazzi or Pulcinella. They both share certain elements with mamulengo, such as a stage with panels in front, behind which lurk one or more puppeteers to animate and give voice to the puppets. Other European puppet traditions are also found in mamulengo, such as characters that are popular anti-heroes, which is also found in the Spanish Don Cristobal, the English Punch and Judy, and the Russian Petrushka. However, mamulengo has many elements that are foreign to European traditions of puppetry. Mamulengo expresses "the hardness of the life of the people of North-East Brazil". Themes of violence, street life, and a satirical outlook are part of mamulengo. Magic is another important theme in mamulengo performances. The puppets of mamulengo may have originated with figures from nativity scenes and pastoral performances that evolved into folk performances that lost their religious meaning during the 19th century.

Mamulengo performances are in public, usually in the rural areas and suburbs during religious festivals. Mamulengo puppets lead parades through the streets of Olinda during the pre-Lent season Carnival. The mamulengo plots feature Biblical themes in general, or comment on current events.

The mamulengo is part of popular culture of the North East, where it has been practiced since colonial times. It portrays everyday situations of people who are the audience, often through comic situations and skits.

== Museum of Mamulengo ==
The city of Olinda has a Museum of Mamulengo, dedicated to preserving the art of mamulengo puppetry. The museum has a collection of antique mamulengo puppets. It also honours the popular masters of the art, such as Saúba, Tonho de Pombos, Luiz da Serra, Pedro Rosa, Zé Lopes, Antônio Biló, and Manuel Marcelino. Olinda itself was declared a UNESCO World Heritage Site in 1982, and has many examples of local Pernambucan culture.

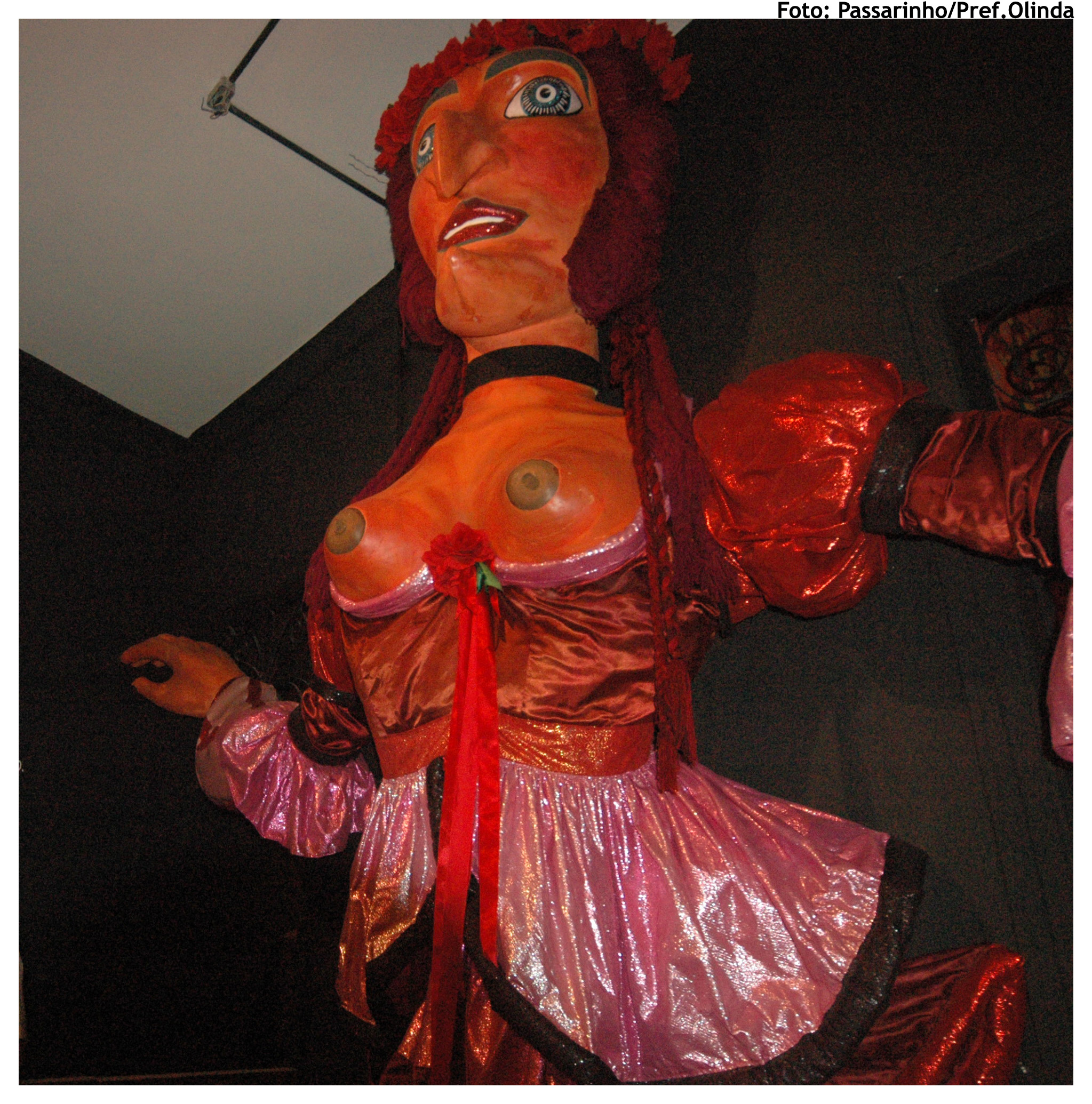
Puppet at the Museum of Mamulengo in Olinda, Brazil.

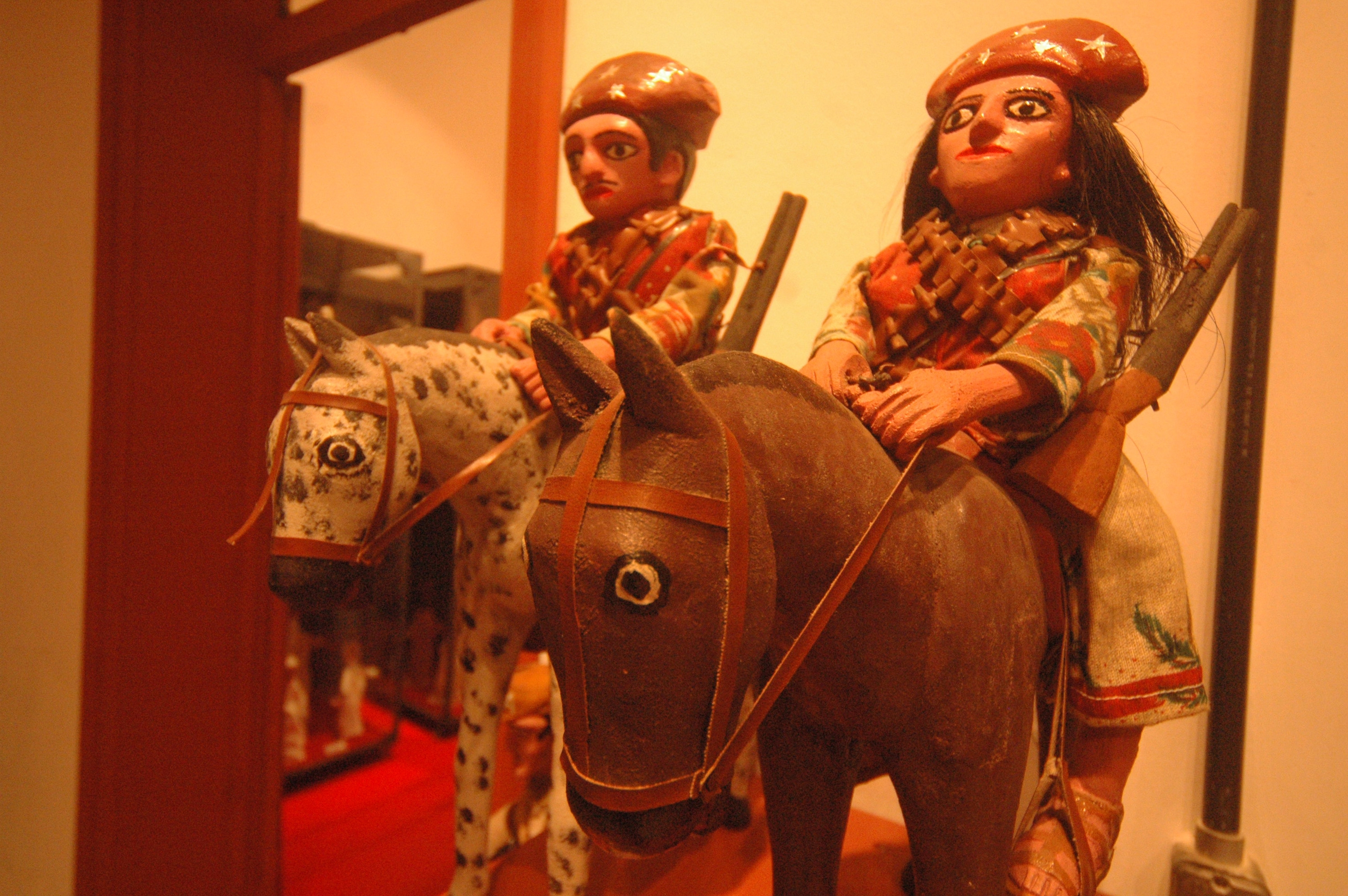
Cangaceiro puppets at the Museum of Mamulengo.

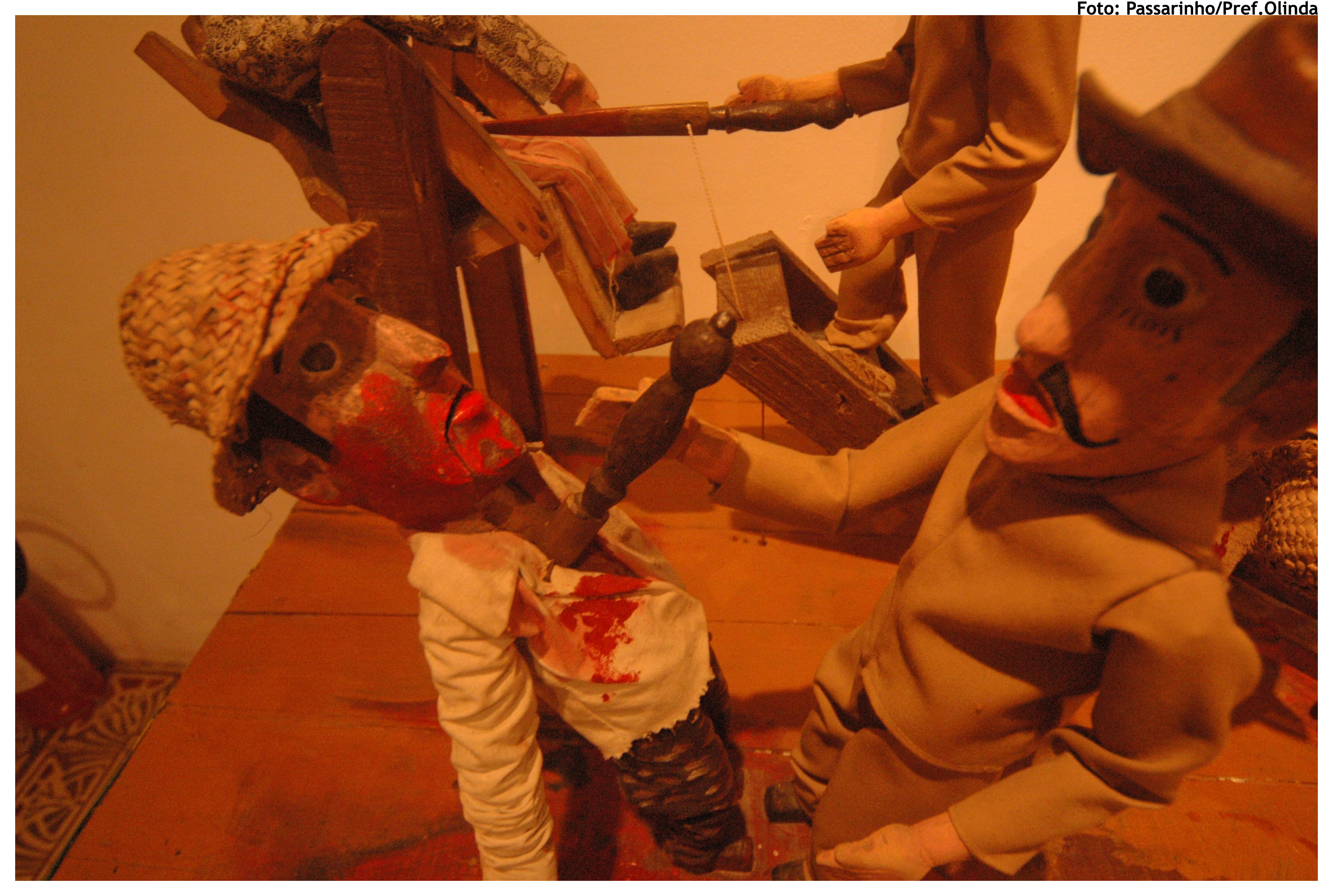
Mamulengo puppets performing crimes.
