= Quinteto Armorial =

Brazilian musical group

Quinteto Armorial (en: Armorial Quintet) was an important Brazilian instrumental music group formed in Recife in 1970. They recorded four LPs until the end of the group in 1980.

The proposal of the Armorial Quintet was to create an erudite chamber music with popular roots, the group managed to perform a synthesis work between classical music and the popular traditions of the Northeast, in addition to the medieval Galaic-Portuguese.

It is considered the most important group to create a Brazilian classical chamber music of popular roots.

Its foundation was a dream of writer Ariano Suassuna.
