= João Suassuna =

Brazilian politician (1886–1930)

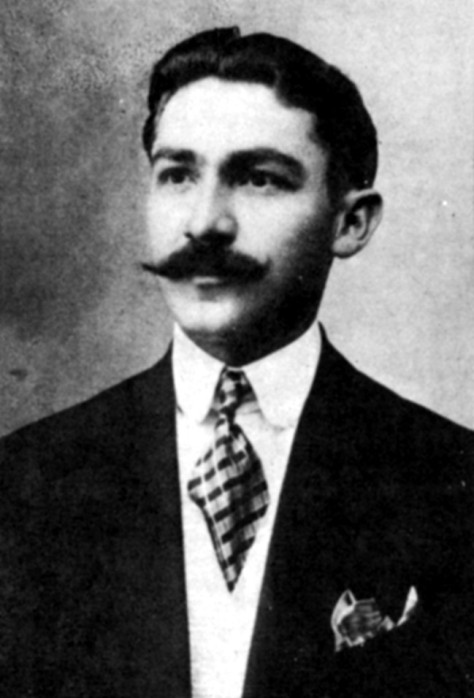

President of Paraíba
- In office 22 October 1924 – 22 October 1928
- Vice President: Walfredo Guedes Pereira; Flávio Ribeiro Coutinho
- Preceded by: Sólon de Lucena
- Succeeded by: João Pessoa

Member of the Chamber of Deputies
- In office 3 May 1921 – 22 October 1924
- Constituency: Paraíba

Personal details
- Born: 9 January 1886 Catolé do Rocha, Paraíba. Empire of Brazil
- Died: 9 October 1930 (aged 44) Rio de Janeiro, Federal District, Brazil
- Spouse: Cássia Villar
- Children: Ariano Suassuna
- Education: Faculty of Law of Recife
- Profession: Politician

João Urbano Pessoa de Vasconcelos Suassuna, better known as João Suassuna (9 January 1886 – 9 October 1930) was a Brazilian politician from the Sertão region. He was the father of the playwright and author Ariano Suassuna.

== Biography ==
Suassuna was born in Catolé do Rocha. From 1924 to 1929, he was the president of Paraíba, immediately before João Pessoa. Whereas Suassuna was the defender of agricultural Sertão culture, João Pessoa was a supporter of modernisation. His son Ariano wrote about the opposition between the two men:

Pessoa represented the middle class of the towns and of the capital, and was in the avant-garde. My father however represented the sertanejos and the status quo. It can be said that they were the last two feudal lords of the sertão...

When Pessoa became president of his state, and Suassuna a deputy, the military were worried about this situation and declared part of Paraíba independent, which provoked the then President of Brazil, Washington Luís to intervene on behalf of the national government. Pessoa was murdered on 26 July 1930 by a relative of Suassuna.

On 9 October 1930 Suassuna was murdered in revenge in Rio de Janeiro where he had gone for a meeting with Washington Luís to try to find a solution to the social unrest in the sertão.

== Legacy ==
- Ariano Suassuna was inspired by the life of his father to write the novel O Romance d'A Pedra do Reino e o Príncipe do Sangue do Vai-e-Volta.
- In 1960 the Campina Grande Airport was renamed the Presidente João Suassuna Airport.
