= Taperoá, Paraíba =

Coordinates: 07°12′28″S 36°49′34″W

Taperoá
- Municipality
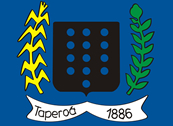
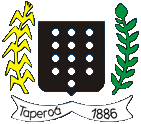
- Flag Coat of arms

- Location in Paraíba
- Country: Brazil
- Region: Northeast
- State: Paraíba

Population (2020)
  - Total: 15,441
- Time zone: UTC−3 (BRT)

Taperoá (Central northeastern portuguese pronunciation: [tɐpɛɾuˈa]) is a municipality in the state of Paraíba in the Nordeste of Brazil. It was founded in 1886. As of 2020 the municipality population is 15,441.

== See also ==
- List of municipalities in Paraíba
