= Simone Spoladore =

Brazilian actress (born 1979)

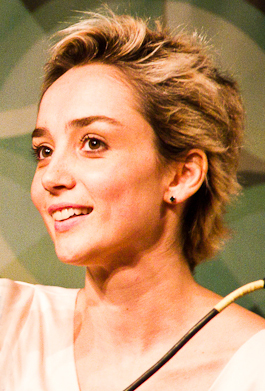
- Spoladore in 2013
- Born: 29 October 1979 (age 45); Curitiba, Paraná, Brazil
- Citizenship: Brazilian; Italian
- Occupation: Actress
- Years active: 1995–present

Simone Spoladore (born 29 October 1979) is a Brazilian actress. Her first film role was as Ana in To the Left of the Father.

Spoladore won the Gramado Film Festival's award for Best Actress in 2010.

In The Book of Delights, Simone portrays Lóri, an elementary school teacher on a journey to explore the existential aspects of love. The film, exploring erotic themes, adapts Clarice Lispector's novel, with director Marcela Lordy incorporating visual elements through structured chapters and photography.

== Filmography ==
- To the Left of the Father (2001)
- Desmundo (2002)
- The Year My Parents Went on Vacation (2006)
- Elvis & Madonna (2010)
- Southwest (2012)

== Television ==
- Os Maias (2001) – Young Maria Monforte
- Esperança (2002) – Caterina
- América (2005) – Helô
- O Profeta (2006) – Luci
- Bela, a Feia (2009) – Verônica Matoso / Veronica Matoso
- Vidas em Jogo (2011) – Andrea Vasconcellos
- Magnifica 70 (2015–16) – Dora Dumar
- Éramos Seis (2019–20) – Clotilde Amaral
- Mania de Você (2024) – Cecília
