= Leonardo Medeiros =

Brazilian actor (born 1964)

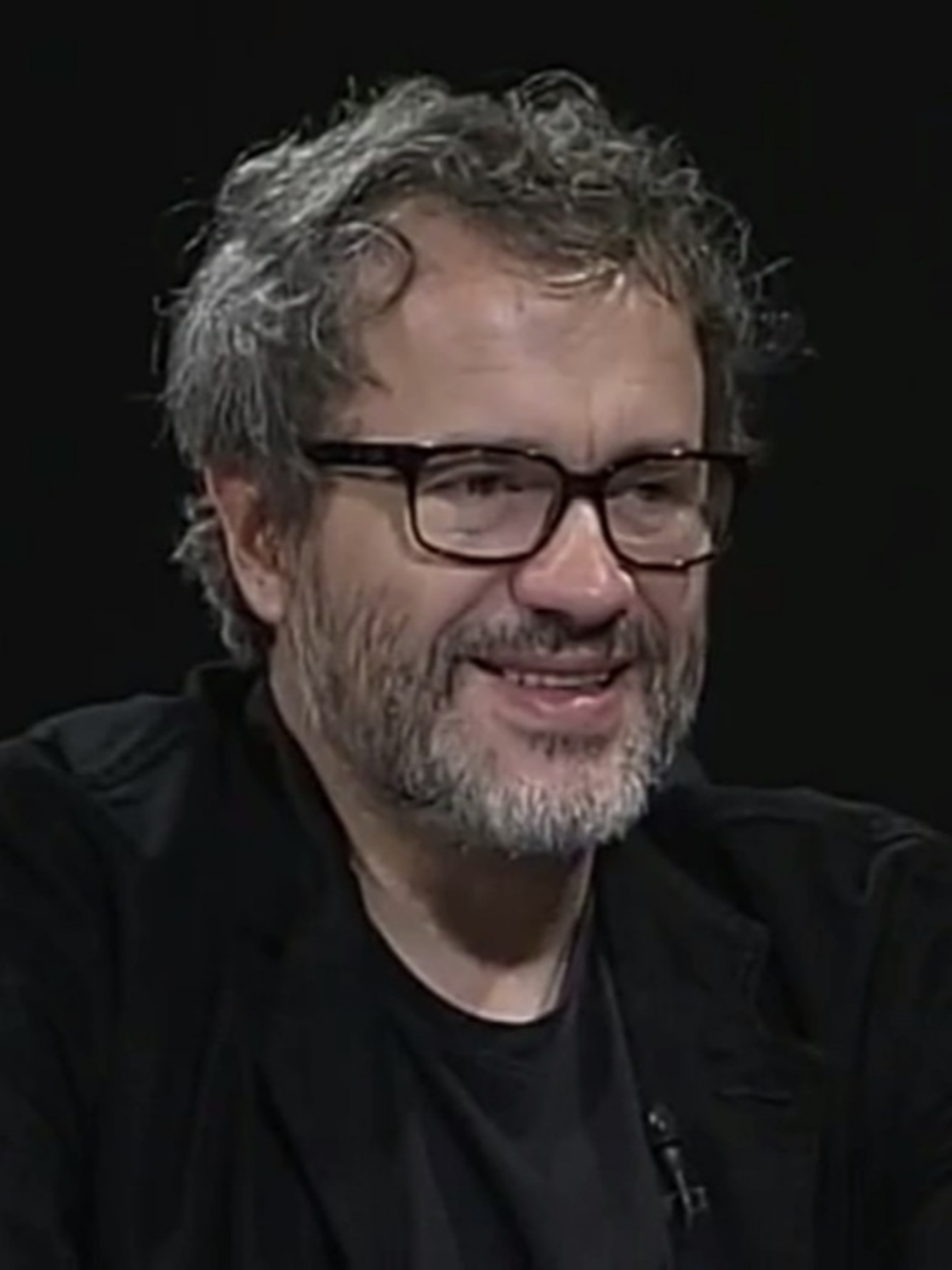
- Medeiros in 2014
- Born: Leonardo Wilson de Medeiros; 20 November 1964 (age 61); Rio de Janeiro, Brazil
- Education: University of São Paulo; British Theatre Association
- Occupation: Actor
- Years active: 1988–present

Leonardo Wilson de Medeiros (born 20 November 1964) is a Brazilian actor.

Before Os Maias, he had worked together with Luiz Fernando Carvalho in To the Left of the Father (2001), a film based on a novel by Raduan Nassar.

His most recent movies include O Veneno da Madrugada, Cabra Cega, Corpo, Não Por Acaso, Getúlio, A menina que matou os pais and O menino que matou meus pais.
