= Selton Mello =

Brazilian actor (born 1972)

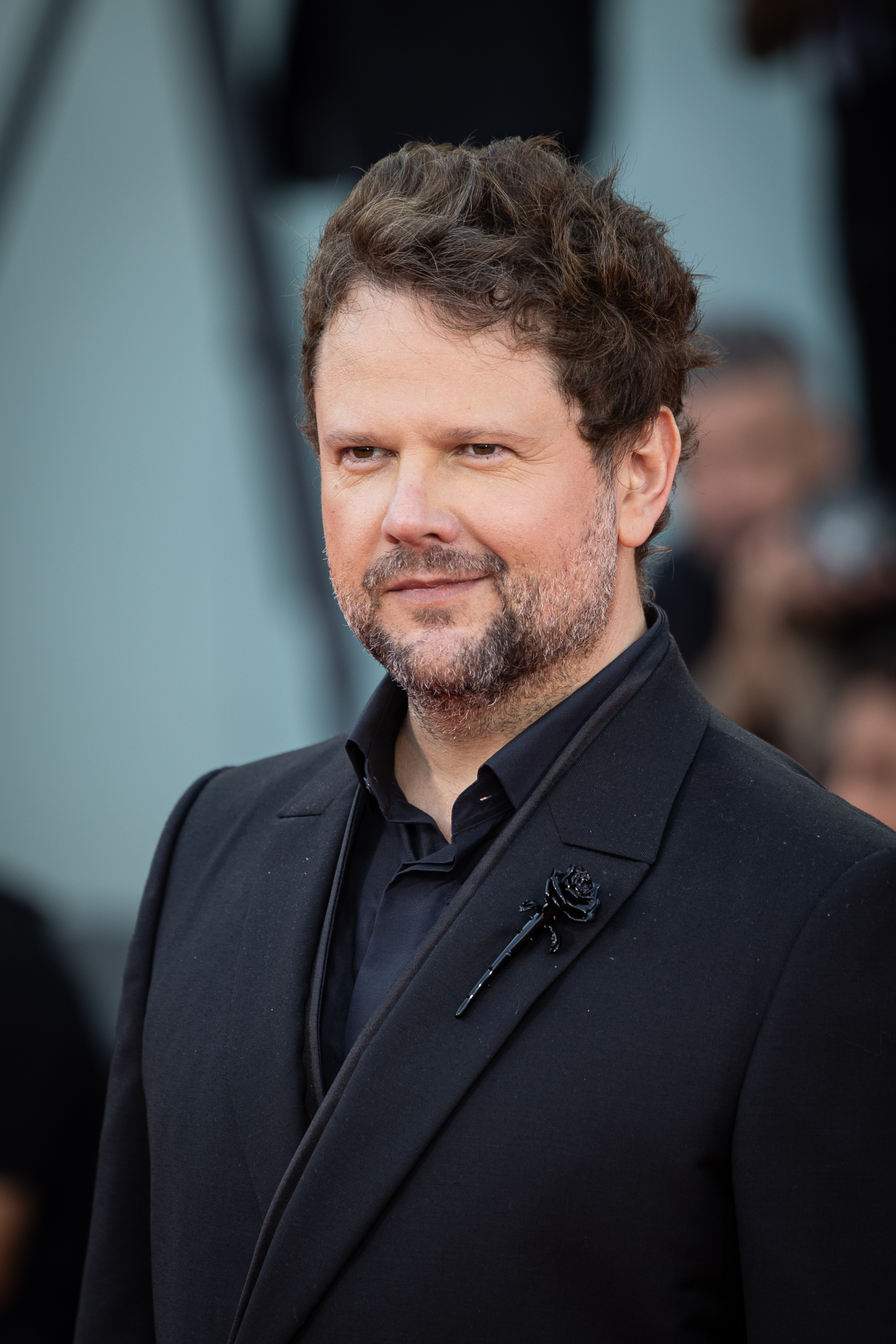
- Mello in 2024
- Born: Selton Figueiredo Melo; 30 December 1972 (age 53); Passos, Minas Gerais, Brazil
- Occupations: Actor; filmmaker
- Years active: 1981–present
- Relatives: Danton Mello (brother)

Selton Figueiredo Mello (Brazilian Portuguese: [ˈsɛwtõ ˈmɛlu]; born 30 December 1972) is a Brazilian actor and filmmaker. Acting since childhood on television shows, Mello gained national popularity in Brazil for his comedic performances in A Dog's Will (2000) and Lisbela and the Prisoner (2003).

In 2008, Mello made his directorial debut with December, followed by The Clown (2011), which was selected as Brazil's submission for the Academy Award for Best International Feature Film at the 85th Academy Awards, though it was not nominated.

In 2024, Mello gained international recognition for his portrayal of Rubens Paiva in Walter Salles' Academy Award-winning film I'm Still Here.

== Life and career ==
=== Early life ===
Selton Mello was born in Passos, Minas Gerais, son of housewife Selva and banker Dalton Melo. He and his family have Portuguese and Italian ancestry. His younger brother Danton Mello is also an actor.

After Mello was born, his parents moved to São Paulo, where he lived until the age of 11. In São Paulo, he was selected to star on a soap opera at TV Globo, and had to move with his entire family to Rio de Janeiro.

=== 2000s ===
He played André in the Brazilian film To the Left of the Father (2001), directed by Luiz Fernando Carvalho and based on the novel of the same name by Raduan Nassar.

He has also played João da Ega in Os Maias, also directed by Luiz Fernando Carvalho, based on the eponymous novel by Eça de Queiroz.

Beyond that, Selton Mello played roles in the movies, Lisbela and the Prisoner (Lisbela e o Prisioneiro - more than 3.5 million tickets sold); Auto da Compadecida (more than 2.5 million tickets sold), by Guel Arraes; Drained (O cheiro do Ralo), by Heitor Dhalia; and My Name Ain't Johnny (Meu Nome Não É Johnny - more than 2.5 million tickets sold), by Mauro Lima and Four Days in September by Bruno Barreto (nominated for Best Foreign Language Film for the 1997 Oscar Awards).

Selton Mello's acting skills have been awarded several times in national and international festivals such as the Havana Film Festival (Cuba), Brasília International Film Festival (Brazil), Lleida Latin-American Film Festival (Spain) and the Lima Latin American Film Festival (Peru) in which he was awarded for his performance in To the Left of the Father. He also won the Cinema Brazil Grand Prize (Grande Prêmio do Cinema Brasileiro) for Lisbela and the Prisoner and the best actor award for My Name Ain't Johnny granted by both the Cinema Brazil Grand Prize and the Miami International Film Festival; and the best actor award for Drained, granted by the Rio International Film Festival (Festival do Rio), Punta Del Este International Film Festival and by the Guadalajara International Film Festival.

Selton is also a screenwriter, editor, and musician. After he developed a solid career as an actor, he began to work on the other side of the camera as a director. He began directing video clips, documentaries, and TV shows. His debut in film directing was in 2006 with the short film entitled When the Time Falls, selected for competitive screenings at the Gramado Film Fest (Festival de Gramado), Rio International Film Festival, São Paulo International Film Festival and the Guadalajara Film Festival.

The award-winning movie December, acclaimed by critics in Brasil and worldwide, marked his debut as a director and has amassed more than 20 awards at various festivals, such as the Paulínia Film Festival (Festival Paulínia de Cinema), Goiania and Curitiba Film Festivals in Brazil.

He also received the Special Jury Prize in Imola/Italy, three awards at the Los Angeles Brazilian Film Festival, including the Best Director and the Best Screenplay award at the 7th Cine Cero Latitud Festival (Festival Cero Latitud de Ecuador), Best Cinematography at the Lima Latin American Film Festival, and in the XI Ibero-American Film Festival of Santa Cruz.

=== 2010s ===
In 2011, he acted and co-directed the TV Series The Invisible Woman (based on the eponymous film) which won the International Emmy Award in 2012 for Best TV Comedy of the Year.

In 2012, he directed Sessão de Terapia, the Brazilian version of the much celebrated TV series In Treatment (Bi Tipul), written by Hagai Levi (originally for Israeli TV and then consequently seen in over 25 countries)

His second film feature, The Clown (in which he directed, co-wrote, co-edited and played the lead character), launched in October 2011, was selected as the Brazilian entry for the Best Foreign Language Oscar at the 85th Academy Awards, but it did not make the final shortlist. This film hit the milestone of 1.5 million viewers, and was received with great enthusiasm by critics, receiving over 40 national and international awards, including Best Director in Paulínia, APCA (Paulista Association of Art Critics - Associação Paulista de Críticos de Arte) and the 38th SESC Film Fest - where it was also awarded as best film (both by the jury and the public selection). He was further enshrined in the Cinema Brazil Grand Prize (Grande Prêmio do Cinema Brasileiro 2012), having won 12 categories, - a record that assured the film a place in the history of the most successful Brazilian films.

== Filmography ==
=== As actor ===
Year	English Title	Original title	Role	Notes
1990	Uma Escola Atrapalhada			
1996	Flora			
1997	Four Days in September	O Que é Isso Companheiro?	César / Oswaldo	
1997	Guerra de Canudos			
2000	A Dog's Will	O Auto da Compadecida	Chicó	
2000	The Emperor's New Groove		Kuzco	Dubbing, Brazilian version only
2001	Caramuru: The Invention of Brazil	Caramuru: A Invenção do Brasil		
2001	To the Left of the Father	Lavoura Arcaica	André	
2003	Lisbela and the Prisoner	Lisbela e o Prisioneiro	Leléu Antônio da Anunciação	
2003	Brother Bear		Kenai	Dubbing, Brazilian version only
2004	Garotas do ABC			
2004	Nina		Ana's boyfriend	
2005	The Colonel and the Werewolf	O Coronel e o Lobisomem	Pernambuco Nogueira	
2006	Tarantino's Mind			Short film
2006	Árido Movie		Bob	
2007	Drained	O Cheiro do Ralo	Lourenço	
2008	My Name Ain't Johnny	Meu Nome Não É Johnny	João	
2008	Os Desafinados		Dico	
2008	The Herb of the Rat	A Erva do Rato	Ele	
2008	Jean Charles		Jean Charles	
2009	The Invisible Woman	A Mulher Invisível	Pedro	
2009	Reflections Of A Blender	Reflexões de um Liquidificador	Blender	Voice only
2010	Lope		Marqués de Navas	
2010	Federal			
2011	The Clown	O Palhaço	Benjamim / Pangaré	Also writer and director
2012	Kings & Rats	Reis e Ratos	Troy Somerset	
2013	Rio 2096: A Story of Love and Fury	Uma História de Amor e Fúria	Immortal Warrior	Voice
2014	Trash		Frederico	
2015	My Hindu Friend	Meu Amigo Hindu	Common Man	
2017	Lino: An Adventure of Seven Lives	Lino: O Filme	Lino	Voice
2017	The Movie of My Life	O Filme da Minha Vida		
2019	Babenco: Tell Me When I Die	Babenco: Alguém Tem que Ouvir o Coração e Dizer Parou	Himself	Documentary
2024	I'm Still Here	Ainda Estou Aqui	Rubens Paiva	
2024	The Rogue's Trial	O Auto da Compadecida 2	Chicó	
2025	Anaconda		Santiago Braga	

=== As Filmmaker ===
Year	English title	Original Title	Notes
2006	Quando o Tempo Cair		Short film
2008	December	Feliz Natal	
2011	The Clown	O Palhaço	Also writer and actor
2017	The Movie of My Life	O Filme da Minha Vida	

=== Television ===
- Sinhá Moça (1986) - Soap Opera
- Pedra sobre Pedra (1992) - Soap Opera
- Olho no Olho (1993) - Soap Opera
- Tropicaliente (1994) - Soap Opera
- A Próxima Vítima (1995) - Soap Opera
- A Indomada (1997) - Soap Opera
- O Auto da Compadecida (1999) - Miniseries
- Força de um Desejo (1999) - Soap Opera
- Os Maias (2001) - Miniseries
- Caramuru - A Invenção do Brasil (2001) - Miniseries
- Os Aspones (2004) - Comedy Series
- O Sistema (2007) - Comedy Series
- A Cura (2010) - Miniseries
- A Mulher Invisível (2011) - Comedy Series
- Sessão de Terapia (2012; 2019-21) - Series; Also writer and director
- Ligações Perigosas (2016) - Miniseries
- Treze Dias Longe do Sol (2018) - Miniseries
- O Mecanismo (2018) - Series
- Nos Tempos do Imperador (2021) - Soap Opera

== Awards ==
- The Clown (MOVIE)

Best Director of Fiction - Menina de Ouro (Paulínia Film Festival 2011)
Best Director - Prêmio APCA (Paulista Association of Art Critics)
Best Actor - Prêmio QUEM
Best Director - Prêmio Melhores do Ano SESC SP
Best Director - Festival de Cinema da Lapa
Best Picture Montage - Prêmio ABC (Associação Brasileira de Cinematografia)
Best Director - Prêmio Contigo de Cinema Nacional
Best Actor - Prêmio Contigo
Best Actor - BRAFFTV - Brazilian Film & TV Festival of Toronto
Best Actor - Cinema Brazil Grand Prize 2012
Best Director - Cinema Brazil Grand Prize 2012
Best Screenplay, Original - Cinema Brazil Grand Prize 2012
Best Editing - Cinema Brazil Grand Prize 2012
Audience Award - Huelva Latin American Film Festival 2012

- Jean Charles (MOVIE)

Best actor - Quem Magazine 2009

- Feliz Natal (MOVIE)

Best director - Paulinia Film Festival 2008
Best director - Goiania Film Festival 2008
Best director - 2nd Brazilian Film Festival - Los Angeles, EUA 2009

- Meu Nome Nao é Johnny (MOVIE)

Best actor - Cineport Festival 2009
Best actor - Prêmio Vivo de Cinema Brasileiro 2009
Best Actor - Cinema Brazil Grand Prize 2009
Best actor - 12th Brazilian Film Festival of Miami 2008
Best actor - Prêmio Contigo de Cinema 2008
Best actor - Prêmio Qualidade Brasil 2008
Best actor - Toronto Brazilian Film Festival 2008
Best actor - Quem magazine award 2008

- O Cheiro do Ralo (MOVIE)

Best actor - Prêmio APCA 2007
Best actor - Rio Film Festival 2006
Best actor - Punta Del Leste International Film Festival
Best actor - Guadalajara, Mexico XXII Film Festival
Best actor - Sesc-Sated award, Minas Gerais
Best actor - Film Festival - Quito, Ecuador

- O Coronel e o Lobisomem (MOVIE)

Best Supporting Actor - Contigo Award Cinema 2006

- Lisbela e o Prisioneiro

Best Actor - Cinema Brazil Grand Prize 2004

- Lavoura Arcaica (MOVIE)

Best Actor - Qualidade Brasil Award 2001
Best Actor - Lleida Latin-American Film Festival 2002
Best Actor - Lima Latin American Film Festival 2002
Best Actor - Havana Film Festival 2001
Best Actor - Brazilia Festival of Brazilian Cinema 2001

- Árido Movie (MOVIE)

Best supporting actor: Recife Film Festival
Best supporting actor: Qualidade Brasil Award
Best supporting actor: Cineport Film Festival

- Os Maias (TV Serie)

Best Actor in a Special Project - Qualidade Brasil Award 2001

- A indomada (TV Soap Opera)

Best Supporting Actor - Contigo Award 1998
