= Frevo =

Dance and music style of Recife, Brazil

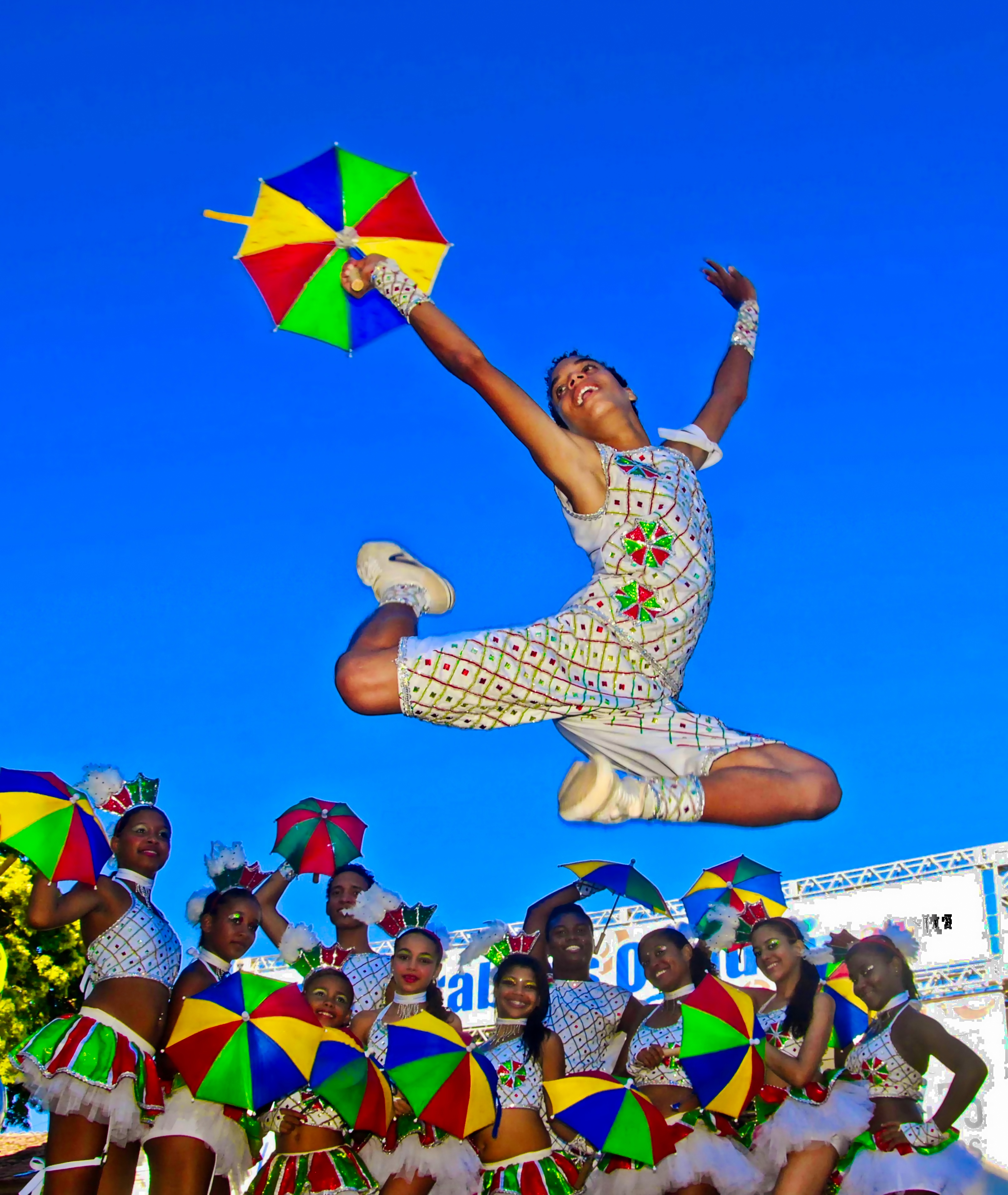
- Genre: Quasi-acrobatical dance
- Origin: Brazil

Frevo, performing arts of the Carnival of Recife
- UNESCO Intangible Cultural Heritage
- Country: Brazil
- Reference: 00603
- Region: Latin America and the Caribbean

Inscription history
- Inscription: 2012 (7th session)
- List: Representative

Frevo is a dance and musical style originating from Recife, Pernambuco, Brazil, traditionally associated with Brazilian Carnival. The word frevo is said to come from frever, a variant of the Portuguese word ferver (to boil). It is said that the sound of the frevo will make listeners and dancers feel as if they are boiling on the ground. The word frevo is used for both the frevo music and the frevo dance.

It was declared as Intangible Cultural Heritage by UNESCO in 2012, under the title "Frevo, performing arts of the Carnival of Recife".

== Origins of Frevo ==
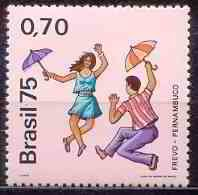
A depiction of frevo on a stamp

The frevo music came first. By the end of the 19th century, bands from the Brazilian Army regiments based in the city of Recife started a tradition of parading during the Carnival. Since the Carnival is originally linked to Catholicism, they played religious procession marches and martial music, as well. A couple of infantry and cavalry regiments had famous bands which attracted many followers amongst the populace of the state and it was just a matter of time to people start to compare one to another and cheer for their favorite bands. The two most famous bands were the Espanha (meaning Spain), whose conductor was of Spanish origin, and the 14, from the 14th Infantry Regiment. The bands started to compete with each other and also started playing faster and faster, louder and louder.

In order to end the violence, the police started to pursue the capoeiras and arrested many during their exhibitions. The latter reacted in a clever way by carrying umbrellas instead of knives and also disguising the capoeira movements as dance movements. Thus the dances evolved into what would be a unique form of dance - the frevo dance.

== Development ==
Frevo is more than 100 years old (1907) and naturally it has developed throughout this time to reach its current form.

=== Dance ===
In the same spirit of competition that created it, Frevo was developed by transforming the capoeira movements into the quasi-acrobatical movements of the dance. Each dancer worked hard in order to develop a new movement which required much rehearsal, strength, endurance, and flexibility and the fight between the groups moved from the physical to the aesthetical field. Frevo dance movements include jumps, coordinated fast leg movements, leg flexions, tumbling, etc.

Frevo dance is now known as passo and Frevo dancers as passistas. The clothes of the passistas also developed from regular clothing to a skimpy attire that is more appropriate for the movements. They are also very colorful, so they can be more visible in the crowd.

The umbrella also developed from regular black umbrellas with wooden handles to a small and also colorful umbrella. Umbrella movements are part of the dance and doing acrobatics with them is a common practice. It's not uncommon to see passistas throwing umbrellas in the air, do some movement, and catch them again. They also pass the umbrellas between their legs. The most common movement is just swinging the umbrella and passing it from hand to hand while executing regular movements.

Starting in the 1950s, one of the biggest contributors to the passo is the master Nascimento do Passo. It's said that he added more than 100 different movements to the dance since then. He also founded the first Frevo school in Recife in the late 1990s. The image of the passista is one of the most prominent icons of the carnival of Pernambuco.

American pop-star Cyndi Lauper is dancing the frevo when she sings her song "Maybe He'll Know".

=== Music ===
==== Frevo-de-rua ====
Frevo-de-Rua (Street Frevo), the most common meaning of the word "frevo", is an instrumental style, played in a fiery fast tempo with brass instruments, namely trumpets, trombones, saxophones, and tuba. It is frequently perceived by American ears as resembling polka.

Frevo-de-Rua bands can often be found playing during football matches in Recife, forming a sort of pep band. A well-known Frevo-de-Rua tune is called "Vassourinhas". A famous conductor in this style is Maestro Duda. In the 2000s the best-known ambassadors of the frevo is the Recife-based big band SpokFrevo Orquestra, led by sax player Inaldo Cavalcante de Albuquerque, better known as Spok. These are 17-18 professional musicians - including two virtuoso drummers and a percussionist - who have made it their mission to introduce the world to frevo music. They embarked on their first US tour in March 2012.

===== Instrumentation of Street Frevo bands =====
- Brass section
  - Trumpet
  - Cornet
  - Flugelhorn
  - Trombone (valved and/or slide)
    - including Bass trombone
  - Mellophone
  - Tuba
  - Euphonium
  - Sousaphone
- Saxophones
  - Tenor saxophone
  - Alto saxophone
  - Soprano saxophone
- Marching percussion
  - Snare drum
  - Bass drum
  - Clash cymbals
  - Surdo
  - Repinique

==== Frevo-de-bloco ====
Frevo de Bloco is also sung and played with string instruments. Capiba was the most famous composer in this style, but one can also cite Getulio Cavalcante. Claudionor Germano (singer) and Antonio Nóbrega (singer and dancer) are two of Frevo de Bloco greatest performers.

==== Frevo de trio (frevo baiano) ====
Adaptation of frevo compositions for smaller formations, commonly without a brass section and made up of Bahian-guitars, drums, bass, electric guitars, keyboards and a singer. The style developed in the early 1950s in Bahia, spurred by a performance given by the "Clube Carnvalesco Misto Vassourinhas of Olinda" in Salvador (Bahia State) and later by the band Trio Elétrico Armandinho, Dodô & Osmar, gave origin to the trio eléctrico tradition of the Bahian carnival, which fused the frevo with Western pop rock.

==== Captain Zuzinha's Band ====
Performances in military ceremonies and various cultural festivals of Pernambuco allowed for musician Capitão Zuzinha and his frevo-playing band Military Police to act as a bridge between the state police and civilians. The band later changed its name to “Captain Zuzinha Frevo Band” in Zuzinha's honour, as he was the driving force that led to national recognition of the band in the 1930's and 1940's. Captain Zuzinha and the band wrote thousands of manuscript scores throughout the early twentieth century and into the early 2000’s. These frevo scores document the historical origins of modern frevo and the genre's emergence in Brazilian pop culture. The Modern Endangered Archives Program at the UCLA Library sponsored a digitization project of nearly 700 music arrangements which document Captain Zuzinha's contribution to the genre. This collection is available digitally through the UCLA library.

== See also ==
- Arrocha
- Baião
- Chôro
- Seresta
