= Raduan Nassar =

Brazilian writer (born 1935)

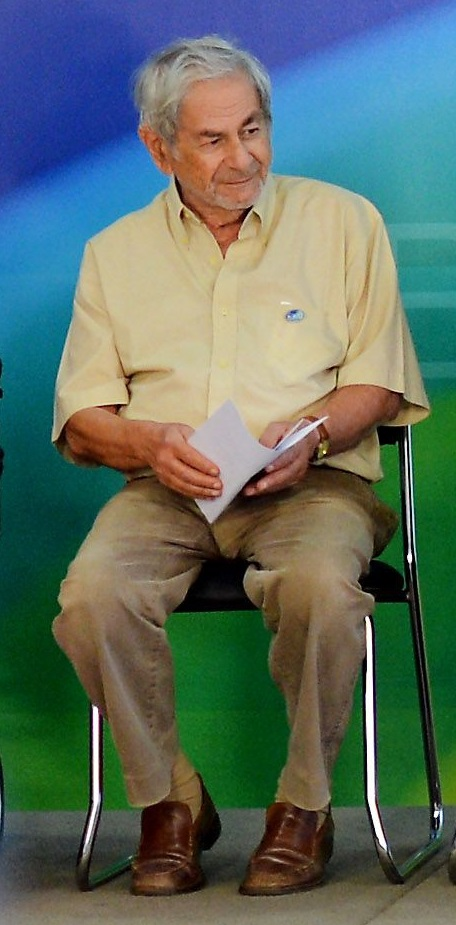
- Raduan in 2016.
- Born: November 27, 1935 (age 90); Pindorama, São Paulo, Brazil
- Education: University of São Paulo
- Occupations: Writer; farmer
- Writing career
- Years active: 1960s–1984
- Notable works: Ancient Tillage (Lavoura Arcaica); A Cup of Rage (Um Copo de Cólera)
- Notable awards: Camões Prize

Raduan Nassar (Brazilian Portuguese: [ʁaduˈɐ̃ naˈsaʁ]; born November 27, 1935) is a Brazilian writer. The son of Lebanese immigrants, he moved to São Paulo when he was a teenager. He studied Law and Philosophy at the University of São Paulo. In 1970, he wrote Um Copo de Cólera, published in 1978. His literary debut was in 1975, when Lavoura Arcaica was released. The Brazilian cinema adapted both of his books, the latter as To the Left of the Father (2001). In 1997, Menina a Caminho, a book of short stories written during the 1960s and 70s, was released.

Despite great critical acclaim, Nassar retired from writing in 1984, claiming he had lost interest in literature and wanted to work with agriculture instead. As a landowner, Nassar dedicated himself to commercial farming until 2011, when he donated the entire farm to the Federal University of São Carlos, on the condition that it should become a new campus. He has also donated much of his real estate and invested in local charity, retiring then to a small farm.

In 2016, Nassar was acclaimed the winner of the 2016 Camões Prize, the most prestigious award of the Portuguese language literature.

== English translations ==
- Nassar, Raduan (7 January 2016) [First published 1975 in Portuguese as Lavoura Arcaica]. Ancient Tillage. Translated by Sotelino, Karen. Penguin Classics. ISBN 978-0141396781.
- Nassar, Raduan (7 January 2016) [First published 1978 in Portuguese as Um copo de cólera]. A Cup of Rage. Translated by Tobler, Stefan. Penguin Classics. ISBN 978-0141396804.

Reviewing A Cup of Rage in British daily newspaper The Guardian, Nicholas Lezard found it to be "a burning coal of a work", adding, "You may consider a book this short to be scarcely worthy of the name, but it packs more power into its scant 47 pages than most books do into five or 10 times as many. Each of its seven chapters comes not only as an unbroken paragraph but as a single sentence: you have to read carefully to keep track, and once you have finished you will want to read it again. The writing is chewy – dense, tough, but well worth the effort".
