= Sessão de Terapia =

- Also known as: Therapy Session
- Genre: Drama
- Created by: Jaqueline Vargas
- Based on: BeTipul by Hagai Levi
- Written by: Cadu Machado; Ana Luiza Savassi; Luh Maza; Ricardo Inhan; Marilia Toledo; Emilio Boechat
- Directed by: Selton Mello
- Starring: Zé Carlos Machado; Selma Egrei; Selton Mello; Morena Baccarin
- Theme music composer: Plínio Profeta
- Country of origin: Brazil
- Original language: Portuguese
- No. of seasons: 5
- No. of episodes: 185

Production
- Producer: Roberto d'Avila
- Production location: São Paulo
- Camera setup: Single-camera
- Running time: 22–29 minutes
- Production company: Estúdios Globo

Original release
- Network: GNT (seasons 1–3); Globoplay (seasons 4–5)
- Release: 1 October 2012 – 9 July 2021

Sessão de Terapia (English: Therapy Session) is a Brazilian television series written and directed by actor Selton Mello, and based on the Israeli series BeTipul, created by Israeli psychologist, Hagai Levi. It is also based on the American version of the series, In Treatment. It debuted on 1 October 2012 on GNT at 10 pm, and ended on 30 November after a total of 45 episodes.

In June 2013, the series official Facebook page confirmed a second season, which began shooting on the third day of that month. It debuted on 7 October, and ended on 22 November after 35 episodes.

After a third season of 35 episodes, Sessão de Terapia was discontinued in 2014. In 2019, it returned with a fourth, 35-episode season, which premiered all at once on Globoplay on 30 August 2019, and was expected to air in 2020 on GNT. Due to scheduling conflicts, Zecarlos Machado did not return as protagonist, Dr. Theo Cecatto, and instead saw Mello take the role of Caio Barone, the new psychologist.

The fifth and final season of Sessão de Terapia premiered on Globoplay on 4 June 2021, and ended on 9 July after a total of 35 episodes.

== Cast ==
=== Season 1 ===
- Zécarlos Machado Dr. Theo Cecatto
- Maria Fernanda Cândido asJúlia Rebelo
- Sergio Guizé as Breno Dantas
- Bianca Müller asNina Vidal
- Mariana Lima as Ana
- André Frateschi as João
- Selma Egrei as Dora Aguiar
- Maria Luísa Mendonça as Clarice Cecatto

==== Guest stars ====
- Mayara Constantino as Malu Cecatto (Episodes 32,37, 41 e 42)
- Norival Rizzo as Antônio Dantas (Episode 37)
- Paulo Miklos as Michel Vidal (Episode 43)

=== Season 2 ===
- Zécarlos Machado as Dr. Theo Cecatto
- Bianca Comparato as Carol Martins
- Cláudio Cavalcanti as Otávio Carvalho de Medeiros
- Adriana Lessa as Paula Varella
- Derick Lecouffle as Daniel
- Mariana Lima as Ana
- André Frateschi as João
- Selma Egrei as Dora Aguiar

==== Guest stars ====
- Norival Rizzo as Antônio Dantas
- Mayara Constantino as Malu Cecatto
- Luana Tanaka as Lia Braga
- Paula Possani as Milena Dantas
- Aline Leite as Tatiana Carvalho de Medeiros ("Tati")
- Giulio Lopes as Nestor Cecatto

=== Season 3 ===
- Zécarlos Machado as Dr. Theo Cecatto
- Ravel Andrade as Diego Duarte
- Letícia Sabatella as Bianca Cadore
- Rafael Lozano as Felipe Alcântara Figueiredo
- Paula Possani as Milena Dantas
- Camila Pitanga as Rita Sanchez
- Fernando Eiras as Evandro Mendes
- Celso Frateschi as Guilherme Damasceno
- Selma Egrei as Dora Aguiar

==== Guest stars ====
- Johnnas Oliva as Rafael 'Rafa' Cecatto
- Mayara Constantino as Malu Cecatto
- Netuno Trindade as Caio Cecatto
- Giulio Lopes as Nestor Cecatto
- Nicolas Trevijano as Tadeu Cadore
- Ondina Clais Castilho as Neusa
- Marco Antônio Pâmio as Frederico Duarte
- Rafael Primot as Guto
- Luana Tanaka as Lia Braga

=== Season 4 ===
- Selton Mello as Dr. Caio Barone
- Fabíula Nascimento as Chiara Ferraz
- Livia Silva as Guilhermina
- David Junior as Nando
- Cecília Homem de Mello as Haidée
- Morena Baccarin as Sofia Callas

==== Guest stars ====
- Thais Morello as Elisa
- Carolina Borelli as Vera
- David Wendefilm as Thomas
- Belize Pombal as Maria Lucia Batista
- Thaia Perez as Isabel
- Zecarlos Machado as Theo Cecatto
- Giovanna Rizzo as Gio
- Roberto D'avila as Nelson
- Fania Espinosa as Carmen
- Jaqueline Vargas as Agnes
- Roberto Mellão as Andinho
- Renato Macedo as Álvaro
- Bruna Chiaradia as Mariana
- Elisa Telles as Patient welcomed by Caio in the end of episode 21
- Yorran Furtado as Patient welcomed by Caio in the end of episode 21 together with the above
- Yndara Barbosa as Bianca
- Ligia Yamaguti as Bianca's girlfriend
- Renata Gasparim as Eva
- Gustavo Merighi as João
- Damião Bertani as Child patient treated by Caio in the beginning of episode 29; brother of the patient below
- Tomé Bertani as Child patient treated by Caio in the beginning of episode 29; brother of the patient above
- Nathalia Timberg as Silvia / Alice Barone

=== Season 5 ===
- Selton Mello as Dr. Caio Barone
- Letícia Colin as Manu
- Christian Malheiros as Tony
- Luana Xavier as Giovana
- Miwa Yanagzzawa as Lidia
- Morena Baccarin as Sofia Callas

==== Guest stars ====
- Rodrigo Santoro as Dr. Davi Greco
- Nathalia Timberg as Alice Barone

== Episodes ==
=== Series overview ===
Season	Episodes	Originally released		
Season	Episodes	First released	Last released	Network
1	45	1 October 2012	30 November 2012	GNT
2	35	7 October 2013	22 November 2013	GNT
3	35	4 August 2014	19 September 2014	GNT
4	35	30 August 2019		Globoplay
5	35	4 June 2021	9 July 2021	Globoplay

=== Season 1 (2012) ===
The series follows Theo Cecatto (Zécarlos Machado), a middle-aged psychotherapist, and his relations with his patients, who visit him daily. Every week day, he welcomes a different patient: On Mondays, Júlia (Maria Fernanda Cândido), a woman dealing with the fear of relationships and who admits to be in love with him; on Tuesdays, Breno (Sérgio Guizé), an elite police sniper who is haunted by the death of a child resulting from a mistake he committed during an operation; on Wednesdays, Nina (Bianca Muller), a teenager gymnastic athlete who got involved in a traffic accident and needs Theo to evaluate her mental condition so she can receive insurance money; on Thursdays, Ana (Mariana Lima) and João (André Frateschi), a couple in constant conflict over personal problems and a pregnancy that one wished and the other didn't. On Fridays, Theo visits Dora Aguiar (Selma Egrei), a fellow psychologist, personal friend and supervisor who starts guiding him. Simultaneously, Theo deals with the fall of his own marriage with Clarice (Maria Luísa Mendonça).

No. overall	No. in season	Title	Original release date
1	1	"Júlia"	1 October 2012
2	2	"Breno"	2 October 2012
3	3	"Nina"	3 October 2012
4	4	"Ana e João"	4 October 2012
5	5	"Dora"	5 October 2012
6	6	"Júlia"	8 October 2012
7	7	"Breno"	9 October 2012
8	8	"Nina"	10 October 2012
9	9	"Ana e João"	11 October 2012
10	10	"Dora"	12 October 2012
11	11	"Júlia"	15 October 2012
12	12	"Breno"	16 October 2012
13	13	"Nina"	17 October 2012
14	14	"Ana e João"	18 October 2012
15	15	"Dora"	19 October 2012
16	16	"Júlia"	22 October 2012
17	17	"Breno"	23 October 2012
18	18	"Nina"	24 October 2012
19	19	"Ana e João"	25 October 2012
20	20	"Dora"	26 October 2012
21	21	"Júlia"	29 October 2012
22	22	"Breno"	30 October 2012
23	23	"Nina"	31 October 2012
24	24	"Ana e João"	1 November 2012
25	25	"Dora"	2 November 2012
26	26	"Júlia"	5 November 2012
27	27	"Breno"	6 November 2012
28	28	"Nina"	7 November 2012
29	29	"Ana e João"	8 November 2012
30	30	"Dora"	9 November 2012
31	31	"Júlia"	12 November 2012
32	32	"Breno"	13 November 2012
33	33	"Nina"	14 November 2012
34	34	"Ana e João"	15 November 2012
35	35	"Dora"	16 November 2012
36	36	"Júlia"	19 November 2012
37	37	"Breno"	20 November 2012
38	38	"Nina"	21 November 2012
39	39	"Ana e João"	22 November 2012
40	40	"Dora"	23 November 2012
41	41	"Júlia"	26 November 2012
42	42	"Breno"	27 November 2012
43	43	"Nina"	28 November 2012
44	44	"Ana e João"	29 November 2012
45	45	"Dora"	30 November 2012

=== Season 2 (2013) ===
After the events in the first season, Theo is divorced and moved to an apartment, where he treats his patients now. The season's patients are: Carol (Bianca Comparato), a college student who recently discovered a cancer; Otávio (Cláudio Cavalcanti), a successful businessman who has been suffering from anxiety issues; Paula (Adriana Lessa), a lawyer who wishes to be a mother but feels she is getting too old for it; and Daniel (Derick Lecouflé), the ten-year-old son of Ana (Mariana Lima) and João (André Frateschi) who struggles to deal with his parents' divorce. On Fridays, he still visits Dora. Simultaneously, he has to deal with the worsening of his father's condition at the hospital, the return of his childhood love and the constant threats of Antônio, Breno's father who blames Theo for his son's death.

No. overall	No. in season	Title	Original release date
46	1	"Carol"	7 October 2013
Theo has moved to an apartment in downtown São Paulo where he also receives his patients. On Mondays at 4 pm, he treats Carol (Bianca Comparato), a 23-year-old Architecture undergraduate who's been diagnosed with lung cancer, but refuses to share the news with anyone because she doesn't want her family to worry and is unhappy with the idea of people pitying her. Theo warns her against carrying this burden alone and encourages her to return next week. Just after she leaves, Breno's father Antonio (Norival Rizzo) knocks on his door, demands his son's coffee machine back, threatens to sue Theo over Breno's death and says he regrets not having killed him.
47	2	"Otavio"	8 October 2013
48	3	"Paula"	9 October 2013
49	4	"Daniel"	10 October 2013
50	5	"Dora"	11 October 2013
51	6	"Carol"	14 October 2013
52	7	"Otavio"	15 October 2013
53	8	"Paula"	16 October 2013
54	9	"Daniel"	17 October 2013
55	10	"Dora"	18 October 2013
56	11	"Carol"	21 October 2013
57	12	"Otavio"	22 October 2013
58	13	"Paula"	23 October 2013
59	14	"Daniel"	24 October 2013
60	15	"Dora"	25 October 2013
61	16	"Carol"	28 October 2013
62	17	"Otavio"	29 October 2013
63	18	"Paula"	30 October 2013
64	19	"Daniel"	31 October 2013
65	20	"Dora"	1 November 2013
66	21	"Carol"	4 November 2013
67	22	"Otavio"	5 November 2013
68	23	"Paula"	6 November 2013
69	24	"Daniel"	7 November 2013
70	25	"Dora"	8 November 2013
71	26	"Carol"	11 November 2013
72	27	"Otavio"	12 November 2013
73	28	"Paula"	13 November 2013
74	29	"Daniel"	14 November 2013
75	30	"Dora"	15 November 2013
76	31	"Carol"	18 November 2013
77	32	"Otavio"	19 November 2013
78	33	"Paula"	20 November 2013
79	34	"Daniel"	21 November 2013
80	35	"Dora"	22 November 2013

=== Season 3 (2014) ===
After a self-given period of vacation, Theo returns to his apartment where he treats new patients: Bianca Cadore (Letícia Sabatella) is a housewife who seems to be submissive to her husband's wills; Diego Duarte (Ravel Andrade), a rich teenage alcoholic who feels ignored by his father; Felipe Alcântara (Rafael Lozano), a young businessman working at his family's company and reluctant to come out to them, especially to his mother; and Milena Dantas (Paula Possani), Breno's widow who seems disturbed by her own routine of perfectionist tasks and obsessive-compulsive disorder. On Fridays, he takes part of a supervision group composed of him, Rita Costa (Camila Pitanga), Guilherme Damasceno (Celso Frateschi) and supervisor Evandro Mendes (Fernando Eiras).

No. overall	No. in season	Title	Original release date
81	1	"Bianca - Sessão 01"	4 August 2014
After a long period of vacation, Theo returns to his apartment and starts treating patients again. He is also invited by fellow therapist Evandro Mendes to take part of a group of mutual supervision. His Monday's patient is Bianca, a woman in her forties who is submissive to her husband Tadeu, a mechanic, and is trying to bring her marriage back to normality. After the session ends, Rafael, Theo's middle son, shows up bruised and upset, asking his father for money to fix his car. Theo lends it, but Rafael leaves in a rush before Theo can accompany him.
82	2	"Diego - Sessão 01"	5 August 2014
Malu tells Theo that Rafael is doing heavy drugs. Theo says he will see what he can do. Later, he welcomes Neusa, who brought 16-year old Diego to try and solve his drinking issues. Theo deduces Diego is her child, but she says she is actually just a secretary hired by Diego's father, the rich businessman Frederico, to take care of the boy. During the session, Diego says he does like to drink, that he has been emancipated from his father so he is legally responsible for himself, and that he feels distant from his father. Theo says he should bring his father to the sessions.
83	3	"Felipe - Sessão 01"	6 August 2014
On Tuesdays, Theo treats Felipe, a rich and young engineer working at his family's company. He is about to marry Nicole under his mother strong influence, but in secret he dates veterinary Guto and is afraid of coming out to his family despite Guto's pressure. Later, Theo accepts Evandro's invitation.
84	4	"Milena - Sessão 01"	7 August 2014
Breno's wife, Milena, pays Theo a visit and discusses his death and their son Victor. She also says she has developed some habits since her husband's death which are upsetting her family, including obsessive–compulsive disorder and strong hygiene concerns. However, she refuses to recognize anything wrong with her. Theo insists that she comes back more times to treat herself and she eventually accepts. Later, Nestor shows up to confront him about Rafael. Theo says he can help his son, and Nestor asks if he will do the same he has done with their father. Angry, Theo asks him to leave.
85	5	"Evandro - Sessão 01"	7 August 2014
Theo goes to Evandro's supervision group and meets Rita, a younger therapist working at a clinic owned by Guilherme, Theo's college colleague who is also taking part of the group. In their first meeting, Theo says he is afraid he may not be able to treat Diego because he is having similar issues with his own son, Rafael. The group decides to think of the matter for the next meeting. Rita talks to Theo and says she admires his courage to openly talk about his son's condition.
86	6	"Bianca - Sessão 02"	11 August 2014
Theo contemplates sending his son to rehab. Later, Bianca has a bruise in her hand, but she says it was just an accident. Eventually, he reveals she got hurt trying to defend her son Enzo from Tadeu's attacks. Theo pressures her to admit if she is suffering from domestic violence, but she is evasive. She also tells him how her parents and brother were murdered following a robbery.
87	7	"Diego - Sessão 02"	12 August 2014
Diego says he is only going to therapy so Neusa leaves him alone for at least a while. He tries to drink, but Theo doesn't allow it. He details his distant relation from his father and Theo deduces he is only drinking in order to gain some attention from Frederico. Later, Malu pays Theo a visit and they talk about Rafael. She is against having him internet.
88	8	"Felipe - Sessão 02"	13 August 2014
Theo tries to talk to Rafael. Lia pays him a visit and offers to stay with Rafael until the next session ends. Later, Felipe says Guto left home, but he is still reluctant about coming out. He also explains his mother has always tried to control him. After he leaves, Lia informs Rafael has passed out in the toilet.
89	9	"Milena - Sessão 02"	14 August 2014
Milena is licensed from the university where she teaches. She said it was due to a minor health problem, but Theo doesn't believe it. Theo suspects her OCD is too strong and recommends she goes see a psychiatrist. She refuses and insists there's nothing wrong with her. Later, Nestor visits Theo looking for Rafael and finds out Theo sent him to rehab.
90	10	"Evandro - Sessão 02"	15 August 2014
Theo tells the group he interned Rafael and says he is still unsure if he should resume Diego's treatment, afraid of projecting his own son on him. Evandro makes him reflect on the consequences of a possible end of Diego's therapy. Later, he and Rita have some coffee.
91	11	"Bianca - Sessão 03"	18 August 2014
Theo calls the rehab clinic to know about his son. Later, Bianca says things are getting better with Tadeu, but Theo doesn't believe her. She eventually admits she can't stand Tadeu's constant suspicions about her and that he beats her. Theo tells her she should go to the police.
92	12	"Diego - Sessão 03"	19 August 2014
Neusa goes to Theo's apartment to see how the therapy is going, but Theo says he can't reveal what Diego tells him during the sessions and that it is Frederico who should have come. Diego says he does not understand why his father does not care about him. He shows Theo a comic book story he's been writing and reveals he was just the second person to ever know about it. He also says he misses his mother, who died at his birth.
93	13	"Felipe - Sessão 03"	20 August 2014
Malu is disappointed and asks Theo to take Rafael out of rehab. Later, Felie details his relationship with his mother, and says she is very proud of him, likes to show him off to her friends and has always raised him like a prince. Theo talks about Oedipus complex and says his relation with his mother may explain his homosexuality. Felipe is still fighting against coming out and prepares for the end of his relationship with Guto.
94	14	"Milena - Sessão 03"	21 August 2014
Milena paralyzes during her session and admits the true reason behind her forced license from the university is because she paralyzed during a master's degree thesis presentation. she explains she sometimes only works under specific circumstances controlled by her, and that includes thinking of certain situations so she can proceed with her duties. The failure of such mechanism is what caused her to paralyze. Theo insists she should go to a psychiatrist and recommends a friend. She reluctantly agrees.
95	15	"Evandro - Sessão 03"	22 August 2014
Tension rises between Rita and Guilherme as they discuss Bianca's case until Evandro asks them to explain what's going on. Rita admits she has an affair with Guilherme which he won't make public out of fear of damaging his clinic's image, says she is disappointed at Evandro for not moderating Guilherme's attitudes and leaves the group. Guilherme follows her. Evandro tells Theo they will determine the future of the supervision group in their next meeting. When Theo returns home, Nestor tells him Rafael has escaped from the rehab facility.
96	16	"Bianca - Sessão 04"	25 August 2014
Theo becomes increasingly frustrated after attempts to locate Rafael fail. Bianca arrives for her session full of bruises and informs she has left home with Enzo following Tadeu's increasing aggressiveness and is now living with a neighbor. She also says she found a gun among his things. Theo tells her to seek help from the police or otherwise, her life and Henzel's will be at risk. She asks him to go with her, but he says she must do it alone.
97	17	"Diego - Sessão 04"	26 August 2014
Diego tells Theo he hit a man with his car following a failed attempt to reconnect with his father. Diego admits he's done that in order to provoke a reaction from his father, but he only worried about what the press would say. He also says he paid his victim a visit at the hospital and was surprised that the man treated him well and told him lots of stories. Diego says nobody likes him, but a phone call by his love interest proves otherwise. They share a hug when the session ends.
98	18	"Felipe - Sessão 04"	27 August 2014
Theo is visited by Malu and Caio. The boy asks about Rafael, and Theo invents a story. At his session, Felipe says his mother is hospitalized following a stress crisis. He eventually admits she suffered the attack after he tried to come out to her. Theo believes he is using the situation as an excuse for not coming out. Felipe decides to break up with Guto in order to decrease everyone's suffering, and Theo questions him if he took his own suffering into consideration.
99	19	"Milena - Sessão 04"	28 August 2014
Nestor texts Malu and says he has a clue to Rafael's possible whereabouts. As the session begins, Milena says everything is fine in her life, but Theo says it is only because everything happened her way. Eventually, Milena starts reorganizing some of Theo's objects so they are geometrically aligned, but Theo puts them back in the place they were before and says she must resist her compulsions and relax. Milena says she misses Breno for he wouldn't judge her for her ways. She mentions a difficulty in reaching orgasms and Theo theorizes she is too organized and methodic to give in to a sensation that requires a relaxed state of mind. Immediately after she leaves, Nestor arrives with Rafael in his arms.
100	20	"Evandro - Sessão 04"	29 August 2014
Theo meets Rita outside the supervision room. She says she will not enter, kisses him and leaves. Alone with Evandro, Theo discusses why he gets so involved with his patient's problems. Evandro says Theo likes fragile patients and dislikes the confident ones. He also recommends him to go see a therapist and deduces Theo is reluctant about it because he does not want to put himself in a fragile position. Tension grows between them as Evandro pressures him to say how his mother died and Theo ultimately admits she committed suicide. Evandro says Theo does not actually try to save his patients, but himself. When he tries to talk about Theo's mother again, Theo says he had it and permanently leaves the supervision. Later, he calls Dora and leaves a message requesting a session.
101	21	"Bianca - Sessão 05"	1 September 2014
Bianca finally denounced Tadeu to the authorities, but says now he is after her. She left her neighbor's house and took shelter with a friend of her father, Miguel. When she got back home to take her and Enzo's things, accompanied by Miguel and his friends, Tadeu threatened her and grabbed her by the throat, but Miguel's friends saved her. Bianca says she's afraid Tadeu is going to commit suicide and says she will die too if he does that. Theo says she must find a new reason to live following her marriage's end. Bianca notices six missed calls from Miguel and calls him back only to find out Tadeu has located their hideout. Theo offers her a ride, but Bianca doesn't wait for him to get his keys and leaves. Soon after, Rafael enters the room feeling sick and passes out.
102	22	"Diego - Sessão 05"	2 September 2014
Rita calls Theo and he tells her about Rafael's condition and that he is in the hospital, expected to leave that day. Diego's father, Frederico, goes to Theo's apartment and insists on a conversation. Frederico says Theo's work is easy and is not being well done, since Diego is only getting worse. Theo says Diego misses him and finds comfort in his drawings, unbeknownst to Frederico. Frederico eventually says he believes Diego is not his actual son, because he discovered among his wife's (Cristina) things letters shared with an ex-boyfriend, whom he met in college and from whom he always felt inferior. Theo says he is afraid of loving Diego and consequently becoming indifferent to his true origin, and afraid of discovering Diego is his true son, which would mean he wasted 16 years of his life rejecting his own child. Frederico leaves without saying a word.
103	23	"Felipe - Sessão 05"	3 September 2014
Guto goes to Theo's apartment during Felipe's session and takes part of it. Felipe says the wedding has been advanced and is just one month away. Guto says he can't stand the situation anymore, breaks up with him and leaves. Felipe follows him. Soon after, Rita pays Theo a visit and they talk about Rafael and Theo's mother. Rita reveals she also had family issues. After her mother left her family, she got closer to her father and started sleeping with him constantly. When she grew up, she felt attracted to her father's friends, which he considered indecent. Theo offers Rita some coffee and she asks for "something more fun". The two have a toast and Rita starts questioning him about his love life. He answers evasively and she tries to leave, but he stops her and they make out.
104	24	"Milena - Sessão 05"	4 September 2014
Nestor visits Theo and says once again he did not take care of Rafael properly. Theo asks what happened to them both and Nestor replies that "they forget they are brothers". Later, Milena arrives late for her session and is consequently more agitated than normal. She explains she became paralyzed when he entered her car. Theo says she must let go of her daily rituals and compulsions for they are getting more intense with time and that she will not get better if she doesn't take her medication. Milena rushes to the toilet, washes her hands and arms with force and stands by the wall with water dripping on the floor. Theo eventually goes talk to her and finds her paralyzed. He questions her if she is taking her medication and she shows him an empty medicine box. He insists on the importance of the pills and that she seeks help from her family. He also says he believes Breno's family truly worry about her and consider her to be family too. She leaves without a word.
105	25	"Dora - Sessão 01"	5 September 2014
Theo and Lia chat about Rafael. Later, he goes to Dora's and tells her of his new patients and Evandro's failed supervision group. Theo asks to be treated by her, but she is reluctant. He proposes that she makes her decision after three sessions with him.
106	26	"Bianca - Sessão 06"	8 September 2014
Bianca misses her session, but Tadeu shows up and insists on talking to Theo. He contradicts most of the things Bianca had told Theo in their previous sessions: her family is still alive, Tadeu is not a mechanic, there is no gun in their house, Theo is not her first therapist, her bruises are caused by herself and her family was against her marriage because they were afraid of what she could do to him, but they decided not to tell him anything because she threatened to kill herself. He also said she lied to many of her previous therapists and has constant anger attacks. After he leaves, Theo calls her last therapist and confirms she has lied to him.
107	27	"Diego - Sessão 06"	9 September 2014
Malu questions whether Rafael should stay with Theo and says Nestor is just trying to help his brother. Later, Diego is angry at Theo for having talked with Frederico. He also says he quit drinking, he is aware that Frederico was never sure of his paternity, that Frederico emancipated him just to get rid of him, that he returned to high school and requested a DNA examination to finally reveal whether or not he is Frederico's son. In order to do so, he agreed with Frederico that he would disappear from his life regardless of the result. Eventually, Diego shows Theo an instrumental he composed with his acoustic guitar and says if he ever wants to picture a father, he will picture Theo. Theo smiles at him and walks him to the door. Then, he looks at pictures of his children.
108	28	"Felipe - Sessão 06"	10 September 2014
Theo meets Rita and they discuss Bianca's lies. Later, Felipe is conformed with his breakup with Guto and his upcoming wedding. He also says his father deduced he was gay and told his mother. His father also told him he is frustrated with his marriage due to his wife being so obsessed with business and will stand with Felipe when he comes out. He also says his mother also knows, but pretends she doesn't. Theo says it will be very good for both if they ever manage to see each other as they really are. Felipe asks him to wish him luck and leaves.
109	29	"Milena - Sessão 06"	11 September 2014
Milena arrives five minutes early and refuses to get in until exactly 9 am. As the session starts, she tells him Victor accidentally sets the kitchen on fire, but she didn't do anything at first because she was paralyzed, which led to her son suffering some burns. Theo asks her once again if she is taking her medication, and she admits she never did it. Theo puts the handkerchief box on the table between them in a misaligned position and asks her not to touch it within the minute. She gives in to her discomfort after one minute and a half, passing his test. Soon after, Theo helps her take the medicine for the first time and she leaves. Nestor pays him a visit and hands him some letters his father wrote him at the retirement home and that Nestor never posted.
110	30	"Dora - Sessão 02"	12 September 2014
Rafael leaves with Lia to buy some ink for her paintings. Later, Theo takes his father's letters, which he is yet to open, to his session with Dora. She reveals she is also visiting a therapist, but refuses to reveal his name. Dora asks him about the letters, and Theo explains he deduces Nestor never posted them out of jealousy, since he was the one to take care of his father but only the son who never visited him would be reminded. He starts reading them and both him and Dora shed some tears.
111	31	"Bianca - Sessão 07"	15 September 2014
Bianca shows up earlier than expected and Theo greets sher as if nothing happened on the previous Monday. She says she left Miguel's house with Enzo and is staying by a hotel. She is furious when Theo reveals he had been visited by Tadeu, but Theo calms her down. When she goes to the toilet, he takes the chance to call Tadeu and informs him of Enzo's whereabouts. When Bianca returns, he tells her that according to Tadeu's version of the story, she is the one trying to keep the marriage and he is the one willing to end it. She becomes infuriated again and says all Theo wants is to separate them. She admits her lies and says she did that out of fear of Theo misjudging her and that her therapy with him was a desperate attempt to save the marriage. She attempts to leave, but Theo locked the door. She loses it again and starts shouting and randomly breaking objects. Soon after she calms down, Tadeu arrives to take her to a mental health institution.
112	32	"Diego - Sessão 07"	16 September 2014
Diego gives Theo the results of his DNA examination, which he does not plan to check. He says he doesn't care if Frederico is his true father or not, and that he now plans to study abroad. Theo says he is trying to run away from his problems; he agrees. Frederico stops by the apartment by surprise and enters. He says he already saw his copy of the results and requests permission from Diego to open his. He hands the files to Diego, who reads them and hands them back saying "they won't change anything". Diego leaves and Theo talks to Frederico alone. Frederico says that now he is sure Diego is his son, he is feeling guilty for all the years of rejection and suspection. Theo explains that after so many attempts by Diego to connect with him, it is about time Frederico shows the same interest. Frederico asks Theo to be his therapist, but Theo says he will recommend a colleague since Diego might come back. Meanwhile, Diego is seen walking down the street.
113	33	"Felipe - Sessão 07"	17 September 2014
Felipe finally came out to his mother and to Nicole. His mother said she raised her son "to be a man, not a fag" and that it would be better for them to marry and then divorce instead of cancelling the wedding. Felipe consequently cut relations with her and quits his job. A man knocks at the door and delivers a flower, a letter and some chocolate sent by Felipe's mother to him. In the letter, she says she is proud of him and asks him to bring Guto for a dinner and to return to the company so he can one day become its president. Felipe tears the letter apart and remarks that she didn't even apologize.
114	34	"Milena - Sessão 07"	18 September 2014
Rafael goes to Ibirapuera Park with Theo and apologizes for his drug involvement. Later, Milena is much more relaxed since she started taking her medication. She also tells the story behind her parents' death and how she feels guilty about it. Theo says she may have blamed herself as a way of explaining the unexplainable and that her OCD developed after Breno's death out of her fear of loss. She tells him stories of her parents.
115	35	"Dora - Sessão 03"	19 September 2014
Theo has a dream with visions of his vacation and voices of all the patients he treated throughout the series. Later, he gives Dora a gift and asks her to open it after he leaves. He updates her about Bianca and Rafael and gives her back a letter she wrote about him in the past and that he read every time he missed her, so he would be angry at her again. He explains he doesn't want to be angry at her anymore. He asks her to treat him, but she refuses because he only looks for her in difficult times. He replies that he now trusts her and needs her. She changes her mind and walks him to the door. Then, she opens his gift and it turns out to be a boat miniature. Theo returns home and is greeted by Malu, Rafael and Caio, who prepared him a surprise dinner.

=== Season 4 (2019) ===
The patients now consult with Dr. Caio Barone (Selton Mello). On Mondays at 11 am, Caio receives Chiara (Fabíula Nascimento), an actress known for comic roles who refuses to accept a recent depression diagnostic. On Tuesdays at 4 pm, the patient is Guilhermina (Livia Silva), a teenager who focus too much on her social media accounts and avoid tackling her real problems. On Wednesdays at 9 am, he is consulted by Nando (David Junior), who has been experiencing erectile dysfunction of psychological origins. The last weekly patient (on Thursdays at 5 pm) is Haidée (Cecília Homem de Mello), an elderly woman who can't get over her husband's death. On Fridays at 5 pm, Caio is himself the patient, consulting with Dr. Sofia (Morena Baccarin), with whom he alternately flirts and fights.

No. overall	No. in season	Title	Original release date
116	1	"Chiara - Sessão 01"	30 August 2019
After having an argument on the phone with his former mother-in-law Isabel, who wants to collect his wife's and daughter's belongings, Caio (Selton Mello) receives his Monday 11 am patient, Chiara Ferraz (Fabíula Nascimento), an actress specializing in comedy who struggles to accept she suffers from depression. She says she's been feeling exhausted and stopped taking her prescribed anti-depressants, Caio prompts her to speak more like Joana (her real name) than Chiara (artistic name), since the latter is constantly trying to be funny and entertaining. After she leaves, he sits on the patients' sofa and has a vision of himself greeting his wife, Vera, and their daughter, Elisa.
117	2	"Guilhermina - Sessão 01"	30 August 2019
As he organizes some boxes, Caio welcomes Guilhermina, his Tuesday 4 pm patient, a 12-year old girl who was born to a Brazilian mother and a Swiss father and who is highly active on social media. She's skipped school for the last week, claiming she was bullied in the restroom, but Caio finds loopholes in her story. Eventually, Guilhermina says she's tired and asks to sleep on the couch. She gets back up soon after, though, and reveals she's been sleeping with her parents every night for a long time, and that her father spoils her a lot and won't allow her to have boyfriends. Caio says she is growing up and that changes are OK and she responds by leaving and saying she'll never get back there again, forgetting to pick up her doll Laura in the process. Caio has another vision of him with his family.
118	3	"Nando - Sessão 01"	30 August 2019
On Wednesdays 9 am, Caio receives Nando, a businessman who is married to Maria Lucia Batista, a sociologist and a successful writer focusing on black feminism topics. He's been struggling with erectile dysfunction and feels less of a man for that. Following some examinations that turned nothing abnormal, Caio insists his impotence is psychological in origin. As the session progresses, Nando explains both were top students in college, but while he made it as a business executive right at the beginning, Maria began her career in low-paid jobs. Eventually, Nando says he proposed to her when he realized he could help her have a better life and Caio questions him whether he married her out of love or out of compassion. Later, he reveals he wanted her to reprehend him after failing to have sex, but instead she was understanding towards the situation. He says they are becoming distant and fears losing his wife. Caio recommends him he reads his wife's books, since he's never read any of them completely. After he leaves, Caio has yet another vision of himself with his family.
119	4	"Haidée - Sessão 01"	30 August 2019
On Thursdays 5pm, Caio treats Haidée, an elderly woman living with her son Mário and daughter-in-law Vanessa following her husband's Afonso death and who sees herself as a problem to the couple. When Caio asks what she wants to achieve with therapy, she replies that she wishes to die, stating she has already done everything she had to in life. When she suggests she's going to overdose on pills, Caio gives her a dose of whiskhy for her to do it, but she goes to the restroom and cries. Later, she comments that during her last trip to New York City, where her daughter Camila lives, she appreciated the engravings found on benches of Central Park containing epitaphs. Caio asks what she thinks would be written on hers and she replies "mother and dedicated wife". Caio suggests that with her husband dead and her children grown, people no longer are dependent on her and that scares her a lot. After she leaves, Guilhermina's father Thomas pays him a visit and attacks him, asking what he told her.
120	5	"Caio - Sessão 01"	30 August 2019
Caio returns to his sessions with his supervisor Sofia after two months. She asks him why he is reluctant about delivering Vera's and Elisa's belongings and Caio deduces she thinks him a coward. As the session progresses, it is revealed that Vera and Elisa were murdered shortly after an argument in which Caio discovered Elisa was not his daughter. Caio feels guilty for their deaths and says he can't understand why the criminal killed them but didn't steal anything. He also reveals he was found to be sterile in recent examinations and that with Elisa's death, he'll never be a father again. He says Guilhermina's father attacked him because he thinks Caio is flirting with his daughter and Sofia says he is not ready to treat adolescents because of what he's gone through with his family. She also deduces he feels guilty for their deaths because the truth about Elisa must have made him so angry that he wished she was dead. Sofia also notices Caio is flirting with her and says he is not doing that out of attraction, but out of fear of being alone. Caio is unhappy and quits the session promising to never return. Later, he leaves Theo a message and goes to a nightclub alone.
121	6	"Chiara - Sessão 02"	30 August 2019
Chiara receives a phone call from her mother, lies about her whereabouts and accepts a request to give her some money. Soon after, Caio accepts to give her a session even though she promised she wouldn't return and, therefore, it was an unscheduled one. Chiara tells the story of her career and Caio asks her whether she did her first auditions because she wanted to be an actress or just because her parents saw a money-making opportunity. She also tells of a school love interest that liked her before she was famous, but later said he preferred the "old Joana". Chiara says no one ever showed interested in knowing her deeply until she started the sessions with Caio and Caio ponderates that she's caring too much about what other people think of her. After she leaves, Caio begins his next session.
122	7	"Guilhermina - Sessão 02"	30 August 2019
Caio has a vision of Vera helping Elisa with her studies. Guilhermina's mother Carmen attends the session while her daughter waits outside and discusses Thomas' outburst last thursday. She says Guilhermina locked herself in her room following the previous session, refusing to talk about it. When she finally did, she accused Caio of making sexual comments towards her. Carmen also said security footage shows Guilhermina entering the restroom alone in the moment she claimed she was bullied. Caio invites Guilhermina in and asks Carmen to leave them alone. As the session continues, someone calls Guilhermina numerous times, but she never answers even when Caio allows her to. He also pressures her to allow him in "her world" and stop lying, but she asks him to end the session. Before she goes, she leaves Laura again, this time on Caio's suggestion.
123	8	"Nando - Sessão 02"	30 August 2019
After finishing a session with a woman, Caio welcomes Nando, who said he managed to have sex with a prostitute and left home, believing his impotence is caused by Maria Lucia. Nando says he felt "avenged" when he admitted to having sex with the prostitute, but can't understand this feeling. Caio suggests Nando is feeling diminished now that Maria Lucia has become a successful professional, that his manhood just couldn't co-exist with her and that he may have sabotaged his own marriage in order to regain his virility, but says only Nando himself can determine whether it is true.
124	9	"Haidée - Sessão 02"	30 August 2019
After commenting that Mario travelled with Vanessa to the countryside and she had to go to the doctor alone in order to treat injuries from a fall she suffered before the previous session, Haidée suffers a panic attack and says she's experienced that before. She also says the examinations revealed a nodule in her thyroid, but she didn't say anything to her son in order not to make him worried. When Caio encourages her to talk about her youth, she says her mother would barely allow her to hang out, but after she divorced, she would go to parties quite often, leaving Haidée alone and waiting for her all night long. As she leaves, Isabel pays Caio a visit and asks for anything that belonged to Vera and Elisa just so she can sense their smell one last time. She also says she and her husband Carlos didn't expect to lose him, as well, and that they should mourn their deaths together. Caio stands facing the opposite direction, never turning to her, and only says Elisa wasn't his daughter. Isabel cries for some moments and leaves as he shows no reaction. Caio then contemplates the boxes containing his family's belongings.
125	10	"Caio - Sessão 02"	30 August 2019
Caio receives a visit from his former-therapist-turned-friend Dr. Theo Cecatto. The reunion soon becomes a session and Theo suggests he needs therapy, even more than supervision, since he's apparently failing to deal with his current problems. Theo also deduces Caio only keeps his patients in order to ease his loleniness. Caio admits he's fallen in love with Sofia. Theo says Caio is looking for a relationship when he should be looking for therapy, and that it is too soon to stop his treatment with Sofia because therapy is a commitment established between the professional and the patient. The episode ends as they leave for a stroll.
126	11	"Chiara - Sessão 03"	30 August 2019
Chiara recalls one episode of bullying inflicted by a teacher back in school and how she managed to manipulate the situation in her favor with humor, which resulted in her gaining the respect of her classmates. After that, she discovered a "power" within herself and she buried her old self. As the session progresses, Caio suggests she is always putting other people's demands above hers and that she should start making herself a priority. After she leaves, Caio googles her artistic name and checks the results.
127	12	"Guilhermina - Sessão 03"	30 August 2019
Caio has a memory of his family. Guilhermina arrives ten minutes before the session and frantically knocks on the door. After she enters, she receives numerous messages and calls, which makes her visibly anxious. After Caio questions her, she admits the caller is her secret boyfriend, Pedro, whom she met on the internet and who is older than her, though she never specifies how much. Guilhermina says he told her lots of lies in order to gain her attention and that disappointed her. Caio notices she's highly uncomfortable about meeting him, but because of Pedro himself, and not because of what her father will do to her if he ever finds out. Before she leaves, Caio makes her promise she will not talk to Pedro again unless she truly wants to.
128	13	"Nando - Sessão 03"	30 August 2019
Nando still blames Maria for the end of their marriage and for his impotence while Caio suggests he reflects on his own contribution to the situation. He also says he's been filed for mobbing by his personal assistant, Michelle, who is black like him. He is frustrated because he saw her as his possible successor in the company and while he recognizes to have always been highly demanding of her, he never thought she minded that. Caio ponderates that Nando may have related to both Maria and Michelle because of their skin color, but that he may have felt threatened by their growth. When Nando mentions his company's HR department has scheduled a confrontation with him and Michelle, Caio recommends he keeps his cool and listens to what his former assistant has to say.
129	14	"Haidée - Sessão 03"	30 August 2019
Haidée comments about a school reunion party that she attended with her old classmates, in which a former colleague asked her out. Haidée thinks she's too old to date again and that Afonso was her only man. She also says Vanessa is pregnant and now she feels more afraid, since her room will probably be designated for the child. She also feels older, but says deep inside she doesn't feel as old as she is, while Caio thinks she is always trying to look older. Caio says she apparently forbids herself from being happy and that she should not be looking for another place to live, but for things that make her feel well.
130	15	"Caio - Sessão 03"	30 August 2019
Caio checks himself on the mirror before he leaves for his session with Sofia. During their conversation, Sofia tries to explore his relationship with his mother, who died when he was a child, but he has no memories of her whatsoever, not even pictures, and says he already exhausted the topic with Theo in the past. Later, he contradicts himself and says he does have a few memories, adding that he was much closer to his father. As he discusses Guilhermina's progress, Sofia suggests he may be attempting to take the role of her father. Later in the session, Caio asks why he always ends up thinking the same things. Sofia throws the question back at him and he reasons that it's something that hurts him and needs to get out. Once they're finished, Caio says he will return next week. Before he leaves, he hugs Sofia, who timidly reciprocates after some hesitation. After he leaves, she has a drink and contemplates the rain falling on the garden outside.
131	16	"Chiara - Sessão 04"	30 August 2019
Caio has a memory of himself dodging a question from Elisa about his mother. Later, Chiara laments that she lost a dream role to Juliana Noronha, a digital influencer with no acting experience. Caio asks her if she truly believes there's no chance Noronha did perform better in the audition and she briefly leaves the room. Later, she talks about her parents and Caio realizes she considers her mother "beautiful and seductive" and her father "invisible and submissive", while the role that was "left" for her was that of the "funny one". Caio says she is tired of being funny and that she needs to believe she can also be the beautiful one. Chiara also tells of an audition she went with her mother for a Mother's Day commercial in which only her mother was selected, but she only found that out when the commercial was aired. She asks him to finish the session earlier and listens to his advice again, via a secret recording she took mid-session.
132	17	"Guilhermina - Sessão 04"	30 August 2019
Caio dreams of the session in which Guilhermina talked about Pedro, but it is actually Elisa speaking while Vera plays the acoustic guitar in the background. Later, at her session, Guilhermina says Pedro threatened her with telling everything about them to her father. When Caio asks her to talk more about their relationship, she reveals he is considerably older than her - enough to drive his own car -, that he molested her and that she once sent him an intimate picture. Caio says what happened to her is serious and encourages her to reveal the truth to her parents. Guilhermina agrees to let her mother in the room and informs her of the incident. Carmen comforts her daughter as Caio observes.
133	18	"Nando - Sessão 04"	30 August 2019
Caio has another vision of his family. Later, Nando says he was suspended at work following the confrontation session between him and Michelle, which he believed was biased due to a woman having been assigned to moderate it. He felt diminished when he walked out of the company while observed by several female colleagues, all of which, according to him, were apparently feeling "avenged". He also says Maria forbid him from seeing their son and he laments that she never even considered the possibility of him being the victim. Later, he recalls some episodes of his youth in which he was a victim of unfairness, but couldn't say a single word in his own defense. Caio says he sees himself too much like a victim, and that he needs to have more empathy. Nando says even though he's not working, he still leaves home with elegant clothes so that he reduces the risk of having trouble when going to stores and malls and says he would like to dress up like they do in Wakanda. Caio says he is not superhero, but he has the power of choice. Nando understands and says he may have lost his wife, but can still save his job. After he leaves, Caio happily performs a song on the acoustic guitar.
134	19	"Haidée - Sessão 04"	30 August 2019
Following the examination that revealed a nodule, Haidée underwent a biopsy and brought the unopened results to the session, willing to read them in Caio's company. Before that, she says everything went well on her date and that she feels younger than ever. She recalls the day in which her neighbor reported her mother to the authorities for partying frequently and leaving Haidée alone, which resulted in her spending about a year in foster care. When her mother regained the right to raise her, she was a changed woman and started to control Haidée's every move. Caio notices Haidée is somehow becoming like her. Haidée leaves without checking the exams, but promises to update him.
135	20	"Caio - Sessão 04"	30 August 2019
After having another vision of his family, Caio welcomes his sister Mariana, who will spend a week in his apartment, and leaves for his session with Sofia. Once alone, Mariana stare at the boxes containing Vera's and Elisa's belongings. In the session, Caio intensifies his attempts to seduce Sofia, who reprehends him for his behavior. He reveals his mother didn't really die when he was a child, but left the family after becoming pregnant of another man. Later, he also says Elisa didn't really want to leave with her mother the night they were murdered. Such memory makes him feel uncomfortable and he leaves the session abruptly. Sofia checks on her notes about Caio, which read "maternal figure", "abandonment" and "resistance".
136	21	"Chiara - Sessão 05"	30 August 2019
Mariana tells Caio their mother has contacted her. He is uninterested, but Mariana insists he gets over their mother's abandonment. It is revealed that the recording of Chiara's session with Caio was leaked, but Chiara says it was due to her cellphone being stolen during the shooting of some scenes. She apologizes, but Caio says she needs not worry about him. Still, he asks her why she felt the need to record the session, and she replies it was because she wanted to listen to his advices and wanted to become a better person. However, she says the incident gave her a career boost: she has triple the followers on social media now and her TV program is reaching high ratings. She also received calls from Noronha, who turned out to be a nice girl; and a childhood love interest named Henry, who asked her out on a dinner (but she declined). Her father left her mother and the latter is disappointed at her for the way she commented the Mother's Day commercial incident and Chiara realises she did distort parts of the story. As the session progresses, Caio deduces deep inside Chiara wanted the audio to be leaked so that people could see the real Chiara (Joana). He recommends she works on a theater play she always wanted to starr in and reminds her some people will like it and some will not, and that's OK.
137	22	"Guilhermina - Sessão 05"	30 August 2019
Mariana insists one more time that Caio meets their mother. Later, Guilhermina's father Thomas comes to the session before Guilhermina, apologizes for attacking Caio and discusses his daughter's behavior. He thinks himself a bad father for having been too flexible with Guilhermina whilst his two other sons are now estranged due to the strict manner in which he raised them both. Caio tells him neither flexibility nor strictness in excess can be a good thing. Carmen and Guilhermina arrive, but only the former comes in. Tension rises between the couple, but Caio makes them both realize their shared responsibility towards the situation and recommends they do individual therapy and, afterwards, couples therapy. When Guilhermina finally enters, Thomas forgives her and she says she's no longer afraid of Pedro and is willing to go back to school. Caio asks the couple to leave him alone with Guilhermina, who says she feels frustrated she won't ever see Pedro again. Caio say it's OK to have such feeling but reiterates she should not talk to him again.
138	23	"Nando - Sessão 05"	30 August 2019
Nando says he tried to talk to the woman who moderated his confrontation session but he lost his temper, yelled at her and ended up fired. Caio says he needs to stop thinking women are "harassing" him but Nando still refuses to recognize his sexism. It is revealed that on the previous Sunday, Nando and Caio met by chance at a nightclub and that Nando hooked up with a woman that Caio tried to approach; Nando eventually taunts him about it and adds that he is just as lost and unconfident as he is. Both stand up and stare each other, but nothing happens. Caio asks Nando why he didn't fight and he says he doesn't want to be the "violent black man". He adds that he doesn't want to be sexist and Caio encourages him to go after this will while respecting who he is.
139	24	"Haidée - Sessão 05"	30 August 2019
Mariana returns to her city and leaves Caio a note asking him to think about everything they discussed. Later, Haidée brings the results again and her nodule turns out to be a benign one. Mario and Vanessa are searching for a house and want her to keep living with them, but she sees the results as a second chance to actually live her own life. Caio makes her reflect about her relationship with her mother and with her son and Haidée realizes her mother must have lived a lonely life. She asks Caio if his mother is alive, and he confirms, to which she replies that he should tell her she's lucky to have him as a son.
140	25	"Caio - Sessão 05"	30 August 2019
Caio has a vision of him and Sofia passionately hooking up before the session. Back to reality, he comments on his mother's return and believes she must be either seriously ill or broke to have remembered about her children. Sofia suggests he must be afraid of seeing his mother again either because she may abandon him again or because he may find out he doesn't hate her as much as he wants to. Caio says he understands but will deliberately not do what he should because he's used to postponing such things. Sofia suggests he is as stuck in the "grieving, abandoned boy" role as Nando is in the "violent sexist man" one, and suggests he can be what he wants to be. As he leaves, Caio says he had an "edgy dream" about them and she suggests they talk about it next session. Caio watches her shade through the glass door for a moment before leaving.
141	26	"Chiara - Sessão 06"	30 August 2019
Isabel leaves Caio a voice message which he doesn't listen until the end. Later, Chiara says her life is crazy with so many commitments. She comments that she passed out during a recent shooting of a scene and she feels bad for affecting the schedule, but after she tells of a similar incident from her childhood that her mother thought was just an attempt to gain some attention, Caio decuces she was actually more concerned about passing out in front of other people. He recommends she leaves her family behind, but she says he's doing bad today and asks the session to be over sooner.
142	27	"Guilhermina - Sessão 06"	30 August 2019
Pedro leaked Guilhermina's intimate picture and everybody made fun of her at school. To make things worse, her father screamed her down instead of comforting her. She feels guilty for it, but Caio says she shouldn't, although commenting that it is a sign that she's beginning to understand she can be held accountable for her actions. Guilhermina says she will never like anyone again, but Caio assures her she will, and it will bring her both happy and sad experiences. Guilhermina feels sick and goes to the restroom, where her mother joins her as she experiences her very first menstruation.
143	28	"Nando - Sessão 06"	30 August 2019
Nando and Maria Lucia agree to have a session together, but Nando is late and Caio begins without him. Maria Lucia talks about racism, sexism, feminism and representation of black people and Caio praises her work, but says she should take it easier with Nando, who seems to be genuinely trying to learn, albeit not dealing with it in a grown-up manner. Nando arrives, tension rises between the two and Maria Lucia threatens to leave, but Nando apologizes and begs her for a second chance. Maria Lucia allows him back home, saying she's not sure it's the right thing for her to do.
144	29	"Haidée - Sessão 06"	30 August 2019
Haidée spent a weekend in Guarujá with her boyfriend Ivan, but her children reprehended her for that, saying she's "too old" for that. When Caio asks her what she thinks of Ivan compared to Afonso, she says her sex life had always been devoted to Afonso's pleasure and still he had many affairs. With Ivan, however, she's feeling loved and valued and even experienced her very first orgasm. Caio says he's very happy for her and recommends she enjoys herself.
145	30	"Caio - Sessão 06"	30 August 2019
Caio watches a video of Elisa's birthday on the phone and angrily throws it against the wall. Later at Sofia's, he says Mariana sent him the video after trying to call him numerous times, presumably to convince him to talk to their mother. Later, he says the night his family was murdered, Vera said he didn't like them anymore and when Elisa asked to stay with him, he angrily told her to go with her mother. Sofia says he shouldn't feel guilty and he replies that he doesn't, but thinks he doesn't deserve to stop feeling the pain. Also, Caio confesses his attraction for her, but she says nothing will ever happen between them and decides to end their sessions, claiming she has fallen in love with him and can't deal with it. Caio leaves, but comes back right after and they kiss.
146	31	"Chiara - Sessão 07"	30 August 2019
Chiara had a fight with her mother and for the first time she decided to stand her ground and draw a line. She feels relieved and has decided to produce the theater play she always wanted to work on. Caio encourages her to pursue her dreams and allow herself to be valued and respected. Chiara leaves and is seen walking down the street with a smile on her face.
147	32	"Guilhermina - Sessão 07"	30 August 2019
Caio finally lets Isabel collects some of Vera's and Elisa's belongings. Later, Guilhermina's parents come to the session and announce their decision to travel to Lucerne, Switzerland, in order to distance themselves from their daughter's photo incident. Guilhermina says she does want to leave Brazil, but wouldn't like to interrupt her therapy. Caio suggests they continue online, but Thomas rejects the idea, saying they should just forget everything and move on and questioning the effectiveness of such medium. Guilhermina insists and says he should do therapy too. He cries and apologizes for the way he's been handling everything. Guilhermina asks to be alone with Caio and says she's learned a lot from her experience with Pedro. Caio agrees and praises her evolution. After she leaves, he has a vision of him and Vera playing acoustic guitars for Elisa to sing.
148	33	"Nando - Sessão 07"	30 August 2019
Sofia and Caio spend the morning together as a couple, but they agree they still see each other as therapist and patient and Sofia breaks up with him. Later, Nando says he's got a new job and has finally had an erection with Maria Lucia. He says he wants to be a better man and Caio says he's already becoming one. Before leaving, Nando gives Caio a copy of Maria Lucia's new book with a dedication to him.
149	34	"Haidée - Sessão 07"	30 August 2019
A woman named Silvia schedules a session with Caio for the day after. Later, Haidée says Ivan mentioned the possibility of marrying her, but she says she wants their relationship to stay the way it is for now. She has decided to move out of her son's and live alone, remove her wedding ring and take a cursinho to prepare for a vestibular exam and pursue her dream career in medicine. She also says it is her birthday and that she wants her Central Park bench engraving to read "Haidée: woke up to life at the age of 68". Caio says he's happy for her and she gives him an envelope for him to open when she leaves. Inside, he finds a letter which reads "life goes by fast. Go live, my son. With affection, Haidée" and a pair of tickets to a cruise that Afonso had bought to him and Haidée before dying and that she no longer wanted to take.
150	35	"Caio - Sessão 07"	30 August 2019
Silvia comes to her session and talks about her life. When she says she has abandoned her two children because of an extra-marital child, she reveals herself as Alice, Caio's mother. Caio tells her everything he thinks with a therapist tone and she says she reached out for her children because she's growing old and wanted a chance of redemption. Caio says he can't give what she's looking for, that he cannot "invent" a mother he never had and that he's no longer the boy she abandoned. Before leaving, she says she's sorry for Elisa and adds that she understands the pain of losing a child. Caio goes to a nightclub and meets Sofia by chance. They exchange looks and funny gestures.

=== Season 5 (2021) ===
No. overall	No. in season	Title	Original release date
151	1	"Manu"	4 June 2021
Sofia (Morena Baccarin) sends Caio (Selton Mello) a video message breaking up with him and recommending him to a doctor called Davi for supervision. On Mondays at 5 pm, Caio receives Manu (Letícia Colin), a fashion designer who's just had her first child and went to therapy under her pediatrician's recommendation after leaving her daughter Liz alone in her bedroom because she wasn't coping with the child's constant crying. She eventually mentions the witching hour and Caio asks why she's scheduled her session at that time, to which she rudely responds that she can schedule whenever she wants. Caio assures her it's ok to have a mix of feelings following the birth of a child and asks her if she wishes to keep coming, but she says she'll think about it. After she leaves, Caio listens to an audio message from his sister Mari (Bruna Chiaradia), who asks if he's coming to their mother's funeral. Caio replies that "the woman who's being buried is nothing mine".
152	2	"Tony"	4 June 2021
On Tuesdays at 1 pm, Caio receives delivery motorcyclist Tony (Christian Malheiros), who's coming to face-to-face sessions following an online period. Caio treats him for free as part of a volunteer COVID-19 mental health project, though Tony feels uncomfortable with this. Tony vents that people will often look down on him for his position and also expresses discomfort about some male clients supposedly having some sort of "fetish" for professionals like him. Tony eventually says that what he really wants is a better, more stable job to provide a better life for his family. Later he says he would like to "die and be born again" in a better position and Caio wonders if that's why he has the habit of riding without a helmet. Towards the end, Caio reminds him that he started therapy after getting hurt in an accident. Tony asks if he's going to ask if he wants to kill himself, to which Caio replies if he would like him to. Tony then admits he does want to kill himself, just like police officers, reckless drivers and drunk drivers want. Tony finally admits he likes what he does for a living and tells Caio he doesn't plan to come back next week, but Caio says the time will still be his anyway. After he leaves, Caio receives a message of his sister lamenting that he didn't go to their mother's funeral but telling him about it anyway.
153	3	"Giovana"	4 June 2021
Mari insists that Caio meets Miguel, their estranged half brother whom their mother had after abandoning them. On Wednesdays at 1pm, Caio treats Giovanna (Luana Xavier), an Afro-Brazilian overweight woman who's unsuccessfully tried numerous strategies to become slim and fears that her condition will eventually kill her. She says she's always the best at what she does because people will usually underestimate her due to her skin color and her looks and the constant doubts fuel her motivation to be the best. However, she admits losing weight is the only thing she failed to do. Caio suggests she cares too much about other people's validation and that she simultaneously wishes and fears being noticed.
154	4	"Lidia"	4 June 2021
On Thursdays at 10 am, Caio treats Lidia (Miwa Yanagizawa), a nurse who's coming back to therapy after interrupting it due to the excessive workload generated by the COVID-19 crisis. She tells a handful of sad stories of sick and dying patients. Caio tells her she's used to taking care of others, but that she should be caring for herself, too, with which she agrees before concluding that the pandemic "was terrible" and crying. Caio also points that she's constantly using "we/us" to refer to the struggles of a nurse during the pandemic, but that the space is hers and that she should focus on her very own hardships.
155	5	"Caio"	4 June 2021
Caio schedules a session on Friday at 4 pm with Davi Greco (Rodrigo Santoro), who had just finished with his child patient Benício (Dani Gutto). Caio observes toys on a table, expresses discomfort with the presence of such objects and says he believes "adult and child therapy are two totally different worlds". Caio mentions his mother's death but grows increasingly angry with the topic. Davi says he has had to learn to take care of himself from a very young age and that he needs to allow someone to take care of him. Caio eventually says he missed both his mother's and his daughter's funerals and that he's "a dick" and abruptly leaves. Davi closes the door and checks on some objects in a separate room.
156	6	"Manu"	4 June 2021
Caio listens to an audio message of a woman braking up with him. Later, Manu knocks on his door but he says she never confirmed it, so he wasn't really expecting her. Under her insistence, Caio accepts to have the session. Manu says her mother has moved in and now she feels monitored by both her and her husband Murilo, especially after he had a security camera installed in the room (claiming it to be something they'll need when they hire a nanny). Malu eventually says she just wants her life back and that she doesn't feel able to love her daughter as much as she should. Caio notices that she apparently sees maternity as just a fulfilled item on a to-do list and reminds her it's about much more than taking care of a child. He also quotes Donald Winnicott on the idea that it is the child who teaches a woman how to be a mother. After she leaves, he starts an online session with Guilhermina (Livia Silva), a patient from the previous season.
157	7	"Tony"	4 June 2021
Tony says he still feels uncomfortable about being treated for free, so Caio proposes they exchange services, and Tony agrees to deliver him some of the meals his parents cook for a living. Caio asks Tony to tell him about the accident and Tony says he was working via an app that specializes on long delivery trips that generate extra money the sooner the items are delivered. Because he was broke at the time, he took on the jobs and rode as fast as possible and eventually collided with a car that was trying to catch a light. Tony was frustrated that the police officers who attended to the scene barely listened to him and that he was taken to a hospital very far from his home, while the other driver was safe & sound inside a luxury, armored car filled with airbags and was quickly helped by a tow car and a taxi. Following the accident, he now walks with a limb, which Caio hadn't noticed. Tony believes everybody spots his situation and makes fun of him, and that he's afraid of never being able to do the things he loves again, such as dancing, flirting and playing football. Later, he has a memory of a book he read when he was in school, To Kill a Mockingbird. He identified with the character who was falsely accused of abusing a woman, and Caio wonders why. Tony eventually says "life is shitty and there's no way out", but Caio says when he was working a lot before the accident, he probably knew there was, indeed, a way out.
158	8	"Giovana"	4 June 2021
Caio listens to an audio message of a friend speaking well of Davi and watches an interview with the therapist. Later, Giovanna says she's casually met with her former husband Alê just before the session and tells Caio of how Alê hooked up with her in a barbecue and walked around the place hand-in-hand with her, not feeling "embarrassed". Caio asks if she believes he wouldn't have wanted her if she were fatter and she stops talking. After he insists that she speaks so he can help her, she laments that she cannot keep a diet and that she will eat compulsively when no one's looking. Caio proposes that she calls him whenever she feels like she's about to do that and she agrees. After she leaves, she opens a ridesharing app and vacillates between going home or to a Japanese restaurant.
159	9	"Lidia"	4 June 2021
Lidia talks about her past, telling Caio of how her father demanded high of her due to her position as first child. When she had to decide on a career to follow, she was stuck between nursing and hospitality management studies, but ultimately decided on the former because she likes to "care for people". Caio wonders if working in the hotel industry couldn't be another form of caring for people. She also reveals she's married to a woman (Andressa) and feared for her father's reaction to the relationship, but he just said "that's not what I expected for my daughter, but if you're happy, I'm happy". After she leaves, Mari pays Caio a visit and reveals their mother bequeathed them an inheritance.
160	10	"Caio"	4 June 2021
At Davi's, Caio talks about his mother and their history together, and comments that he feels uncomfortable treating Manu because of her motherhood issues. Davi suggests that by helping Manu work through her challenges, Caio would be humanizing his mother and her past mistakes. Caio says he's "afraid" of learning more about his mother's inheritance because it would extend her presence in his life and because he could even like what she left them. He then reveals details of the night his mother left: she was quieter than usual during dinner and put them to sleep, which she wouldn't usually do. Caio woke up in the middle of the night and saw his mother leaving home with some suitcases. He cried for her, but she walked away without even looking back. Mid-session, Caio notices Davi keeps boxes with his patients' names and spots one labeled "Caio", but Davi says it belongs to another patient. After Caio leaves, a woman (Camila Lucciola) carrying a guitar case enters Davi's room and they exchange serious looks before she leaves.
161	11	"Manu"	11 June 2021
Caio's telephone screen is shown with several missed calls from Giovanna. Also, the building's janitor leaves an envelope at his door. Manu tells Caio that she lived with several different relatives as a child and never developed intimacy with her mother. Caio deduces she may be afraid of developing intimacy with her child the way her mother never did with her, and that's why she tends to leave her daughter either alone or with someone else. Manu says she has an appointment and quickly leaves.
162	12	"Tony"	11 June 2021
Caio listens to an audio message in which Sofia's new boyfriend angrily tells him to stop messaging her. Before his session, Tony chit chats with another patient, Eva (Renata Gasparim). Later, he tells Caio of the day some criminals stole a package of money he was supposed to deliver and that his boss first suspected of him, and then had him "apologize for being robbed". He also says he's happy that he talked a bit with Eva and Caio reminds him that now he doesn't see himself as an "intruder", but as just another patient, so much that he's wearing casual clothing instead of his motorcyclist attire. Eventually, Tony reflects that "there are things in life that can't be controlled". Caio asks what he would like to control and he tells him of a manga he likes in which if the main character writes the name of a person while mentally visualizing them on a certain notebook, they will die. He then says "it's tough not to know when we're gonna die" and Caio asks if he would like to write his name on the notebook, but Tony just leaves. Caio then listens to an audio message of his sister insisting that they discuss their mother's inheritance. He then checks on the envelope he received in the previous episode and learns it is related to legal procedures related to the inheritance.
163	13	"Giovana"	11 June 2021
Caio talks about his mother's inheritance with Theo. Soon after, he tosses the envelope on the trash can. Later, Giovanna says she's just been to a brunch with her childhood friend, who gathered some friends to announce her wedding and invite them to be her bridesmaid. Giovanna is happy with the invitation, but plans to decline it because she grew annoyed and offended with the girls' discussions of diets and also thinks it's pointless to spend so much on a one-night dress. Caio apologizes for not taking her calls at night but reminds her she never answered his return calls, either. Eventually, Giovanna says she noticed her father never cared for her state and would often offer her high-calorie meals. She later reminds of a movie about a serial killer who receives the death penalty from a judge who is seemingly remorseful of "wasting a human life full of potential". Caio asks why she thought of that movie and she says she sees her father in the judge, because her father admires her while she walks along a "death row". Giovana says she wants to "eat in order to live" and not the opposite, but Caio asks if she sees that she's doing quite the opposite. Giovanna says she's going to eat with a friend and leaves.
164	14	"Lidia"	11 June 2021
Lidia, still traumatized and feeling unable to resume work at the hospital, tried to have a doctor friend give her a sick note, but he refused. She says her legs simply "paralyze" whenever she attempts to enter the hospital and wonders what's wrong with her. She also says Andressa found out about her condition and now is angry with her for keeping such situation from her. And that she had a major conflict with her family after venting on pretty much everything that was disturbing her. She says Caio is "at fault" for this and he replies that one can only be "at fault" after deliberately causing harm to someone, and wonders why she used such term. Lidia receives a phone call from the hospital and says she's going there right now. Caio is glad that's she's willing to tackle work. Later, Mari pays him a visit and they have a heated argument over Caio's reluctance to accept their mother's inheritance.
165	15	"Caio"	11 June 2021
At Davi's, Caio comments on Sofia's boyfriend's message and on his patients. Davi notices Caio appears to lack confidence on his ability to help them and asks him if he still likes to treat people. Caio then talks about Tony and concludes he's growing "attached" to him, which he believes will tamper with his work. Davi says he totally opposes the idea that attachment will necessarily be an obstacle in a therapist-patient relationship. He then repeats his question and suggests that Caio's patients do not all really have issues with their mothers, but that it is Caio who always sees a bit of his mother in all of them because deep inside he's still looking for her and waiting for her return. Davi mentions one patient who decided to become a priest as a way of fighting his insecurities after being abandoned by his mother, and Caio angrily rejects that he's following a similar path. He then asks Davi to keep the envelope, which he still hasn't opened. Caio mentions the box with his name and Davi asks him what else would he keep in a box at his place in case they started one. Caio says keeping such a box would be pointless. Eventually, Caio expresses disagreement over Davi's approach, and he reminds him that starting therapy with a new professional means subjecting oneself to the process of "deconstruction". Caio leaves and Davi checks on an old picture of a man and a child.
166	16	"Manu"	18 June 2021
Álvaro (Renato Macedo), a patient of Caio, comments mid-session that Caio seems to be "daydreaming" while he speaks and announces he will leave earlier and doesn't plan to go back. Later, Manu talks about her struggles with breastfeeding and how Liz is rejecting her breast over the baby bottle. Caio assures her the baby is just rejecting her breast, not her altogether. Manu also mentions that her mother would often buy her lots of things as a way of "compensating for her absence", but Caio wonders if it isn't just the way she manifests love, just like her recent attempts to bond with her.
167	17	"Tony"	18 June 2021
Mari has breakfast with Caio and after an exchange of mild provocations, she gives him Miguel's phone number and reminds him he's just another victim of their mother. Tony comes in late and comments that he witnessed another motorcyclist being abused by police officers and decided to intervene by shooting a video. He shows Caio the video, in which he delivers a fiery speech, and Caio expresses his approval of it, commenting on how Tony was able to speak up his mind. Tony, however, doesn't plan to post the video online. Caio comments that he was worried about Tony following their previous session. Tony mentions a neighbor who committed suicide and says he is afraid of dying. After he leaves, Caio starts crying and checks on Miguel's number.
168	18	"Giovana"	18 June 2021
Giovana tells Caio she rejected additional food from her father, which started a heated argument between them, and that she felt like "a different person" when she said "no" to the father. She then details their relationship and reveals that as she came of age, her father grew increasingly overprotective and started prohibiting her from wearing short clothes and being "too nice" with customers. They eventually conclude she would eat a lot simply to obey her father, so much that one night she collected food from the trash can that she had previously discarded in order not to eat it. Caio assures her that speaking up her mind doesn't make her "a different person", much the opposite. He asks her what does her father usually cook, and she says he can cook pretty much anything, especially Italian dishes. Caio, having noticed that she usually goes to Japanese restaurants, reminds her that he can't cook Japanese food. In the middle of the session, Giovana asks Caio if he has any siblings. After some hesitation, he says he has a sister.
169	19	"Lidia"	18 June 2021
Giovana calls Caio, and this time he answers it. Later, Lidia says she needs to go on a trip, which she never did as a child, which caused her to make up every text about the topic that her teachers asked her to write. She then tells Caio the tale of Urashima Tarō. She concludes the story if about "exchanging work for fun", but Caio notices she apparently believes the protagonist was punished for having fun. Caio asks what would Lidia keep in her tamatebako and she says she would put her mistakes and maybe her siblings because she would love to spend some time alone with her parents. She then tells about one incident at the hospital in which two patients suffered simultaneous cardiac arrests and her co-worker Fernanda simply paralyzed instead of helping her. She then chose to prioritize an older widowed patient with children "so they wouldn't be alone" over the other patient, a young man who she thought would be more "resistant". The latter ended up dying. Caio notices how she usually brings up the topic of loneliness and asks her to describe Fernanda, and is surprised to find out she's young. Lidia starts crying, says she's feeling "funny! and abruptly leaves. Caio sends her a voice message saying he's worried and asking her to call him back. Sofia calls Caio and apologize for her boyfriend Jonata's behavior.
170	20	"Caio"	18 June 2021
Caio apologizes to Davi for his behavior during their last session. He reminds one day in which he got lost inside Copan Building while accompanying his father, an architect, who went there to check on a renovation he was leading. Davi wonders if he feared being abandoned again during the incident and later in the session asks if he really got lost or simply went hiding. He comments on his patients and concludes that if they knew how he was doing, "there would be none left". He also comments on his sister's attempts to connect with Miguel, which he despises. Davi mentions that he has lost trust in several of his close ones and he might be stuck in a certain "loop" and that may be preventing him from getting to know Miguel. He also believes Caio doesn't want to know Miguel out of fear of liking him and possibly tearing down the "fantasy" that he created in his mind. Caio reminds of the night his mother left him again and concludes that by abandoning her family, she was abandoning her role as a mother. Caio comments on his relationship with Sofia. Davi suggests Caio has "two mothers": the one who raised him until he was seven and whom he misses, and the one that chose to prioritize herself and "be a woman, not a mother". He then asks which of the two is he mad with and suggests he got himself involved with Sofia because she represented his mother and he represented the affair that removed his mother from the family. Davi also concludes Caio inadvertently "tests" the ones around him in order to see if they'll stand by him or simply leave like his mother. He says being stuck in a "loop" is human and he himself has reached a stalemate with his wife because he wants to have a child and she doesn't. Davi concludes therapists like them are good at caring for others. The session ends with both emotionally promising not to stop their progress together.
171	21	"Manu"	24 June 2021
Caio proudly watches Tony's video, which he finally posted online. Later, Manu complains again about her role as a mother and Caio comments that she's struggling to create intimacy with her mother and daughter. Manu eventually concludes the wanted to be a better mother than the one she had, but "failed completely". She comments she is supposed to travel to Paris for work but is not sure if she really wants to go.
172	22	"Tony"	24 June 2021
Caio receives a voice message from Miguel (Danton Mello), who wishes to meet him. Later, Tony comments that when he rides his motorcycle at high speeds, he forgets everything and starts fantasizing that he is a superhero saving people. Caio wonders what is he trying to escape from with such fantasy and Tony concludes it's his life and reality. Caio says there's nothing wrong with fantasies, but reminds him that sometimes they can limit people, and exemplifies by reminding Tony that he often believes girls will want nothing with him because he walks with a limb.
173	23	"Giovana"	24 June 2021
Giovana gains a few kilos and starts eating compulsively again after the fight with her father. Caio asks her why she didn't call him and she explains she simply wanted to eat and that's it. She reveals that during the fight, the father said he made her fatter on purpose claiming that if she were thinner, men would "take advantage of her". He also said that should simply accept that she "was born fat and will die fat". Together, they conclude she ate compulsively in order to "obey" her father's prediction. Caio compares her and her fight against obesity to the myth of Sisyphus and assures her she doesn't have to "let the boulder fall back again" and that it is normal for a journey to have its ups and downs, but that the failures should be exceptions. As she leaves, she says she wishes she could hug him because nobody ever does that to her. A sad Caio sits on the sofa with his hands on his face.
174	24	"Lidia"	24 June 2021
Caio checks on some pictures of him and Sofia. A woman (Karine Teles) knocks at his door, shows him a watch in a plastic bag and asks him "what the fuck is this". It is revealed that she is Lidia's wife Andressa and that she was indeed scheduled to be there, but together with Lidia. She aggressively questions Caio's ethics and competence, reveals that Lidia crashed her car into a lamp post following their last session and asks if Caio is going to try and "seduce" her. Caio insists that they do not start the session without Lidia. Andressa starts talking more about Lidia and concludes their marriage is "over". Lidia arrives and is disappointed that the session started without her. She vents a bit more about work, reveals she made Fernanda up and that she was actually alone in the room that night, and promises Andressa she will communicate more with her. The couple leaves and Andressa apologizes and thanks Caio.
175	25	"Caio"	24 June 2021
Caio asks Davi if he and Sofia ever had an affair and he assures him that they never had anything. Caio then starts complaining about her and Davi says that Sofia, well aware of Caio's background, shouldn't have allowed romance to grow between them. He also points out that she "abandoned" him as a therapist to become his lover. Eventually, Davi asks about his father and Caio praises him, saying he "held his own" with the task of raising the family alone. He then tells of a day in which he ran away from a school trip with some friends and got one of them injured. On the way back with his father, he started crying and his father told him to "suck up his crying and take responsibility for his mistakes". Caio then claims he has always taken responsibility for his actions. Davi claims his father raising the family alone may have been his way of "sucking up his crying and taking responsibility for his mistakes", since there is a possibility that Alice left because of him. He also reminds Caio that the topic of abandonment haunts him and claims the story he has just heard has nothing to do with his father being a "great man", but is just another example of Caio putting those close to him to the test. Caio then asks if Davi believes he is angry with his father. Davi asks the question back and Caio abruptly leaves. Davi calls a woman named Rachel and says he would like to schedule an extra appointment with her to talk about Stella, who "hasn't come back", which has caused him to feel sick.
176	26	"Manu"	2 July 2021
Manu says she's tired and tells Caio she has had some time alone with her daughter in which she was finally able to breastfeed her. She also says she declined her trip to Paris because the event will happen every year, but such moments with Liz will soon be gone forever. Caio notices that she's speaking about maternity in a more "welcoming" and less distant tone, and compares her evolution to Alexander the Great resolving the Gordian Knot.
177	27	"Tony"	2 July 2021
Caio has a session with a patient named Lucy (Aline Fontes), who complains about the constant harassment of her boss, who would disrespect her even in front of her daughter. She eventually says the only man she doesn't hate is Caio himself, looks at him provocatively and abruptly walks towards the door, leaving a confused Caio. Later, Tony reveals he has managed to both organize an upcoming major strike of food delivery motorcyclists and hook up with his dream girl. Caio congratulates him on his achievements and notices that their current arrangement is not working because Tony keeps forgetting his food, so he proposes he starts paying directly with money, albeit under a reduced price. After he leaves, Caio receives a phone call from Giovanna, who's having a heated argument with her father.
178	28	"Giovana"	2 July 2021
Caio sends an audio message to Sofia saying "he's sorry" for something that's not specified. Giovana says the fight erupted after she arrived home and, having eaten some salad, refused her father's high-calorie meal. The father insisted by bringing a plate to her room, and then she felt the urge to call Caio. Caio wonders why did she want him to watch the fight and hypothesizes that she wanted a "witness". She confirms, and he notices how she sees everything as a "court", recalling the session in which she compared her father to the judge. After she leaves, Caio listens to an audio message of Miguel inviting him to meet him.
179	29	"Lidia"	2 July 2021
Lidia says she's planning to travel alone to spend some time with herself. She then talks about a childhood friend called Maria Fernanda and recalls a day in which they switched their names on a test in which she performed poorly, so that Lidia would seemingly have a good grade and make her father proud. Maria Fernanda, however, was beaten by her father due to her supposed bad performance and stopped talking to her until both girls and their parents were summoned at the principal's office to explain themselves, en event at which Lidia "paralyzed". Caio believes she paralyzed at the hospital and made Fernanda up because she wanted to have somebody there to help her just like she had her friend back in school.
180	30	"Caio"	2 July 2021
Caio recalls the day of his father's funeral, in which he got lost driving around São Paulo. Davi once again asks if he got lost or just hid himself, and Caio cries. Davi suggest Caio may be transferring his father on Miguel. Caio, having Googled Miguel, is surprised with their resemblance. Davi recommends he meets Miguel without "sucking up his crying", but showing him as he really is. After Caio leaves, Davi's wife Stella comes in and they have a heated argument over having children. Stella says Davi needs to "look for the mother he wants so much". Davi replies that he wants her to be that mother, cries on the floor and they share an emotional hug.
181	31	"Manu"	9 July 2021
Caio sends Miguel an audio message saying he is available on Thursday by the end of the afternoon. Later, Manu is happy now that she's connecting more with Liz. She also reveals she's starting a new design brand named after her daughter, and Caio notices that "Liz" may be a short form for Elizabeth, which is her mother's name. Manu is surprised that she inadvertently paid homage to her mother when naming both her daughter and her brand.
182	32	"Tony"	9 July 2021
Following his viral video, Tony is invited by Eva to deliver a speech at her college. Tony also says the strike he helped promote was a success and that he and a few other representatives were invited to negotiate with the food delivery apps. He also announces to Caio that he will take a cursinho to try and study psychology in college. Caio tells him a bit about his job routine and how he got involved with this field. As Tony leaves, Caio gifts him with two books by Ferréz.
183	33	"Giovana"	9 July 2021
Mari pays Caio a visit and tells him not to meet Miguel in case he's just willing to fight. Caio says he won't and thanks her for not "giving up" on him. Later, Giovanna says she's got a job interview, that she's just mortgaged a new apartment, that she accepted the invitation for her friend's wedding and that her recent exams revealed better results than before. Caio says he's happy for her progress.
184	34	"Miguel"	9 July 2021
Lidia sends Caio a voice message, sharing details about her trip and letting him know that she'll schedule a session upon her return. Later, at 5 pm, Caio is visited by Miguel. Their initial interaction is tense, with Caio repeatedly and harshly criticizing Alice while Miguel defends her as a "protective mother." Miguel mentions he's "getting along well" with Mari and reveals he knows about Caio's family tragedy. In response, Caio explains that he is the one who truly knows Mari, having cared for her after their mother's abandonment. He adds that he unlearned how to love due to that experience, but relearned through his daughter, only to have "the world take her away from him." Miguel suggests they start slowly and attempts to leave, but Caio asks him to stay, and they share a tearful hug.
185	35	"Caio"	9 July 2021
Benício, who's about to move out of the city, is saddened by the thought of no longer seeing Davi, whom he always wanted to be his father. Meanwhile, Caio arranges a dinner with Miguel and Mari and bids farewell to Benício. During the session, Caio recounts his initial encounter with Miguel. Davi presents him with a box bearing his name, and inside, Caio finds the envelope, which he finally opens. The contents include a drawing of a woman and a child on a beach, a photograph of Alice and Caio, a legal document confirming Caio as an heir, and a handwritten letter from Alice. In the letter, she apologizes for abandoning him and expresses regret for attempting to contact them only once. Caio expresses remorse for not having bid farewell to his daughter and reveals plans to visit her grave, intending to place numerous sunflowers — her favorite flower. Caio recalls how she used to say that sunflowers usually "look for the sun," and he plans to do the same from now on. The episode ends with images of Caio walking down the street.

=== Season 6 (2026) ===
No. overall	No. in season	Title	Original release date
186	1	"Erica – Sessão 1"	TBA
On Monday 6pm, Caio has some wine with fellow psychologist Erica (Olívia Torres), whom he met in a congress. What he thought was a possible date soon became a therapy session and a potential supervision session, as well, with Erica expressing interest in the latter two. She reveals she is married to Arthur (Rodrigo Veronese) and that they had a spare room in their house which he converted to a baby's room as a surprise for her, which she interpreted as an ultimatum for them to have a child, which confused her because he had undergone vasectomy in the past, but recently reverted it. Caio asks her if the wants to have children and she reflects that being a mother is much harder than being a father. Caio mentions the myth of Psyche and concludes that she may be struggling with a choice, and that it's often easier to say no to one self than to another person. Arthur shows up at the door and is seemingly unhappy to see the wine bottles on the table. After the couple leaves, Mari visits him and announces she is 25 weeks pregnant. Caio is elated, but she is upset because the father, Guido, wants her to get an abortion, which she contemplates because she doesn't want to raise it alone. Caio says he can be by her side in order to help with the child.
187	2	"Morena – Sessão 1"	TBA
On Tuesdays 4pm, Caio treats Morena (Alice Carvalho), a dentist whose 67-year old father (a samba musician known as "Seu Sorriso" ("Mr. Smile")) has developed Alzheimer's disease. She goes to a mutual aid group that bores her and is unhappy with the recent caretakers she hired and claims the necessary arrangements are hard to organize. However, she rejects sending him to a nursing home because she is reluctant about "abandoning" him. She is also concerned that they only allow patients to bring one suitcase with 120 items. She feels it's impossible to "summarize" her father in just 120 items and Caio suggests she's actually afraid of preparing the suitcase due to what it truly represents: her father moving out of their childhood home. She reflects it is unfair for him to have developed such disease following a healthy life and Caio encourages her to keep going to the group sessions, because people there may learn something from her. Caio also suggests her therapy is a search for someone with whom to share this difficult moment. After Morena leaves, Erica sends him an audio message apologizing for the day before and explaining that she shares a schedule with her husband, which explains how he got there.
188	3	"Ulisses – Sessão 1"	TBA
On Wednesdays at noon, Caio treats Ulisses (Paulo Gorgulho), an elderly man and former patient returning after six years. Uli says he was recommended to therapy after his doctor thought he was too concerned with his appearance. He comments on how many friends of his age are dying, including his ex-wife Berenice, and reflects that he may be afraid of aging and dying, as well. He tells of his son's wedding, in which the son thanked everyone except for him and he believes he did so because he went to the party with an escort, which displeased the groom. He recalls Berenice's funeral, which he attended mostly against his will, and tells of how he eventually kissed her on the lips before quickly leaving after he noticed people were staring. Caio asks if that's what brought him to therapy, Uli says he doesn't know, but Caio comforts him, stating he will help him understand and elaborate. Mari asks Caio to accompany her in a medical appointment.
189	4	"Ingrid – Sessão 1"	TBA
On Thursdays 8am, Caio treats Ingrid (Bella Camero), a young trader with a desperate need to perform at the highest possible level. She arrives very early for the first in-person session (after several reschedules) and is unhappy that Caio cannot see her before the agreed time. With quick gestures and an accelerated pace of speech, she explains that she is the best, that she works in a high-pressure environment and that she's been taking some "stuff" with a daily average of 4-12 cans of energy drinks to keep herself focused. She also claims that her sister Maya, who is an artist, has been "drugging" her because she once saw some content on sedatives on her computer. Ingrid says she is "better" than her in terms of performance, behavior and appearance and dismisses her artist work as a total waste of time. Ingrid found Caio after a secretary named Antônia caught her sleeping at her desk and told her she had to see a professional or else she would report her to HR. When Caio asks why she didn't ask HR to refer her to a psychologist, she replies that her company is like a "shark tank" where everyone is "just waiting for your mistake". When Caio asks her why she is going to therapy if she handles pressure so well, she tells of how her father, also a trader, broke down following a 60-hour shift and pretty much ended his career and Caio suggest she might be afraid of suffering the same fate. She tearfully denies, says therapy is not going to work because it is for "weak" people like him and leaves.
190	5	"Rosa – Sessão 1"	TBA
On Fridays, Caio goes see Rosa Gabriel (Grace Passô), to whom he was referred by Davi. She treats patients at the same house where she lives with two teenage daughters. Caio says he's not interested in therapy and is actually looking for supervision. He eventually mentions psychologists who are "paternalist" towards patients and she remarks that this was a curious word to use, since at one moment he said he would no longer have children. As he leaves, he is desperate to find a passed out Mari in the waiting room.
191	6	"Erica – Sessão 2"	TBA
Mari is treated at the hospital and Miguel announces he's coming to their aid. Caio discusses Erica's shared schedule with Arthur and questions about their individual privacy, also commenting that partners usually share schedules when they are sharing parenting responsibilities. Erica insists Caio becomes her supervisor and Caio says she must take it seriously and no longer set up "scenes" to catch her husband's attention like he suggests she did in the previous session. Caio insists they talk about her intention to raise a child and Erica wants to focus on supervision, instead. Caio questions about her relationship with her previous therapist and starts noticing a pattern of her fleeing her own problems to focus on her patients instead. After discussing a few cases, she says her period is late and tells of a day in her childhood in which she forgot a doll and her father recovered it, held it in front of her and mimicked its voice saying "you forgot me, mommy", which traumatized her. Caio asks about her previous lovers and she says she constantly fell in love with "wrong" men, including married and gay men. Erica receives a message from Arthur saying he managed to schedule a last-minute appointment and she's afraid of going there and finding out she is pregnant. Caio asks her if she'll have it in case the pregnancy is confirmed and she leaves without an answer. Caio notices she forgot her jacket and picks it up, finding a chocolate and a note thanking him for "the warmth and comfort".
192	7	"Morena – Sessão 2"	TBA
Morena, who is turning 32 today, notices her father is losing the ability to care for his hygiene and nutrition on his own. She still struggles with caretakers and tells of a day in which her father left home and got lost even under a caretaker's attention. He was eventually found in a ballet school talking with the teacher and commenting on the class's performance. She says she felt afraid, and that she now is more afraid of the disease than on sending him to a nursery home. However, she also felt betrayed because she never knew his father was into ballet. Caio then asks her if she never kept any secret from him and she tells of a boyfriend that she had but broke up with before her father could know. She also says she once hid some women in her house in order to keep them away from him. She recalls one particular woman named Leonor that she did appreciate and that she wished to have by her side now. When they again talk about sending him to the nursery home, Caio asks her if it isn't worth it even if more expensive, since he'll receive more attention there. Morena says she's afraid of people claiming that she "abandoned" him and Caio says no one has the right to judge her. After she leaves, he learns from Miguel that Mari is going through pre-eclampsia and wants his presence.
193	8	"Ulisses – Sessão 2"	TBA
Miguel pays Caio a visit and suggests they go talk to Guido, even if Caio dislikes him. Later, Ulisses says he is writing his autobiography guided by questions raised by his assistant on his life. Ulisses claims people want to know certain things for the sake of entertainment, but Caio asks what does he want to know. He tells other stories of his life with Berenice and concludes that everyone at her funeral had better lives than his. Caio thinks this is too melancholic a way to view his life and empathizes with his mourning by telling of his daughter's death. Caio asks what he would like to say to Berenice if he could and he goes to the restroom without saying anything. When he returns, he says he no longer sees himself in the mirror because all he sees is an old man with just about five years remaining and who belongs in a retirement home. Caio says there's much he could do and asks him what he would like to do and he replies he would like to be the President of Brazil. He then proceeds to say that the most important thing he has ever done was marrying Berenice, but that they divorced due to "that son of a bitch Alberto" (his son). When Caio asks him to elaborate, he reveals Alberto resulted from an extramarital affair with a model who refused to abort, which lead to the end of his marriage. Caio tries to make Ulisses see that he is blaming all his life's misfortunes on his son simply for getting born.
194	9	"Ingrid – Sessão 2"	TBA
Ingrid arrives early again and disturbs another session. She also says she will make a slightly shorter payment because the previous session ended 5 minutes earlier. Caio reprehends her and insists she follows the rules. She tells of a day when she was ten in which her sister embarrassed her in front of some ugly, 12-year old boys by revealing she had never kissed. One of them remarked that she was pretty, which, according to Ingrid, made Maya jealous. Maya then told the boy to kiss her sister. Ingrid was paralyzed and didn't resist despite being disgusted at all of them and grew disappointed at her sister for putting her through this. Caio asks if she has ever discussed this traumatizing episode with her, and she denies it. He then suggests their relationship will never change if she doesn't deal with the episode.
196	10	"Rosa – Sessão 2"	TBA
Rosa reprehends her older daughter Joyce on the phone for spending a fortune in a dermatology clinic and calls a therapist called Paula to say she'll require therapy because one of her patients has the same name of the therapist who treated someone named Lauriano. Later, Caio says he was reluctant about returning to her because he didn't think of her as welcoming and because he believes their first session didn't go well. In another moment, she reprehends Caio for telling Ulisses of his daughter's death because in doing so, he may have swapped roles with his patient. Caio angrily rejects Rosa's attempts to talk about his father, mother and daughter and Rosa believes he is doing therapy through his patients' own processes. She also insists that they establish whether they are going to do therapy or supervision, since Caio asks for the latter but puts her in the role of the former. Rosa finishes by saying he may feel uncomfortable with her because she can also lie, run away and die, like people close to him did. Caio leaves and comments to a girl how difficult Rosa is not knowing she is her daughter Joyce (Cassia Gois).
197	11	"Erica – Sessão 3"	TBA
Caio and Erica keep discussing her marriage and possible motherhood. He confronts her about taking Arthur everywhere in her life and asks why a man who wanted to be a father went through vasectomy and why a woman who wants to be a mother plans to get pregnant with a man she learned was sterile, and concludes by asking what are they committed with. Erica reacts by going to the restroom. She returns with a pregnancy test and says she hasn't had the courage to check it yet. She finally checks it and is happy that it turned out negative. Based on several events of her life, Caio remarks that she seems to be constantly sending sings to him, Arthur, her mother and even patients that she is trying to become a mother. Caio then finishes by asking her who would she be if she took everyone and their opinions "out of the equation".
198	12	"Morena– Sessão 3"	TBA
Guido sends a message to both Caio and Miguel and Miguel insists they talk to him, while Caio rejects the idea. Later, Morena says she was frustrated to look at a family picture on a beach and not remember when and where exactly it was taken. Caio says it is only natural that some memories will be lost as one grows. She comments she is afraid of becoming the past that her father has forgotten and Caio reminds her she has a life of her own and is more than just her father's memory. She then announces she has finally agreed to hospitalize her father and that in order to afford it she will stop therapy, but Caio says she can continue and they'll arrange payments later.
199	13	"Ulisses – Sessão 3"	TBA
Caio has a dream with his daughter as a teenage girl. Later, Ulisses says he has just found out that he's a grandfather, and that he was "the last one to know". Caio suggests he may not be really looking for news regarding his son, either, and Ulisses calls Alberto "a symbol of his failure". He also reveals he and Berenice were expecting a child, but lost it shortly before Ulisse's affair happened. When he says he cannot be a father, Caio asks if he can be a grandfather. Ulisses tells Caio about a dream he had in which he sees his reflection in the water, falls into it and emerges in a large avenue where no one recognizes him. Both then try to draw a parallel with the myth of Narcissus. He says his autobiography has the working title of "Uli Vasconcelos: an Odyssey of the King of the Night" and he says he may not want to be Ulisses, but Caio reminds him that he is.
200	14	"Ingrid – Sessão 3"	TBA
Caio calls Davi to schedule a conversation about Rosa. Later, Ingrid says she tried to discuss the kissing episode with Maya, but the sister replied that she invented all of this and they ended up in a physical fight. She says her sister's boyfriend seems to be "watching" her, which she deduces is an order from Maya, but Caio asks if she doesn't believe he may be truly interested in her. Caio then tries to discuss her social life and she dodges it, dismissing relationships and describing herself as terrified of meeting new people, specially via dating apps. Ingrid comments again on the possibility of someone be overhearing their conversation from outside and Caio asks her if there's anything that she would like to say that she wouldn't want anyone else to listen. She then reveals that her sister abused her by teaching her to kiss and reproducing sexual acts she learned about in hentai manga. After he learns that Maya told Ingrid never to reveal this to anyone or else people would think she was crazy, Caio suggests this is the reason why Ingrid is so afraid of people listening to her conversations. Ingrid thanks him and says she had never been able to speak her heart out like that before. After she leaves, Guido comes to demand information on Mari and confirms he did ask her not to have it because he has three children already and having a child at his age is difficult. Caio kicks him out and Ingrid is seen in the waiting room, holding her telephone.
201	15	"Rosa – Sessão 3"	TBA
Rosa reprehends her daughters for their shopping sprees and says she's doing what's possible to raise them in the absence of their father. Caio says he intends to end their work together and in the ensuing discussion they again gravitate between therapy and supervision. Rosa asks him why does she disturb him so much and says she's not her mother, sister or daughter, who all "left" him somehow. She then asks him who is this perfect person he's looking for. After Caio leaves, Joyce arrives, apologizes and confesses herself insecure about her body.
202	16	"Erica – Sessão 4"	TBA
Erica says Arthur was jealous of her for taking the pregnancy test with Caio. The session covers several issues Erica has with motherhood, including changes in her body and in her life that she is afraid of. Towards the end of the session, Erica confesses she feels good with Caio "looking at her with curious eyes" and suggests they would be "a good couple". Caio denies it and she leaves.
203	17	"Morena – Sessão 4"	TBA
Morena was finally able to pack her father's belongings for the nursery home. She was helped by Leonor and confesses herself surprised that she was there to help even after Morena did everything she could to prevent any woman to come near her father. She was even able to remember where the picture mentioned in Moren's previous session had been taken (Ubatuba); after this, they decided to quickly head to that beach and Morena canceled her appointments. She later finally took her father to the nursery home and says she felt like taking a child to their first school day. She later mentions a possible love interest, but says her father wouldn't approve of it anyway, and Caio asks why would he have to approve it.
204	18	"Ulisses – Sessão 4"	TBA
Miguel says he'll move in to Mari's once she's discharged from the hospital, but Caio says she'll have more room in his apartment. Miguel says Mari's presence may disturb his routine with his patients and insists to stay with their sister before ending the call, leaving Caio visibly uneasy. Later, Ulisses says he nearly "died with a hard cock" because he wanted to party hard like the old times and took some drugs, including MDMA and erectile dysfunction pills. He later says his mother often used him as a shield against his father because the couple had agreed not to fight in front of him. He once even confronted his drunk father to prevent him from fighting with his mother, to which the father replied "you're becoming a man, huh?" and walked away. Caio asks Ulisses what is he protecting his mother from nowadays, and he is unsure.
205	19	"Ingrid – Sessão 4"	TBA
Ingrid reveals she recorded Caio's altercation with Guido and claims conversations in his apartment can indeed be heard from outside. Caio then discusses with her that she has an extreme need to always prove herself right and suggests this may be a result of growing up with her sister, with her being the "perfect, behaved one" while Maya "always messed everything up". Ingrid tells she brought a major client to her company and expected more recognition from her bosses, but she just received public praise and a tap in the back. Caio suggests she wants to be recognized for what she does. She says she told her father, who spread the news in the family's group chat, which got her worried that Maya would react badly to that. Ingrid then reveals she always hid all medals and awards she's received since a younger age in order not to make her sister dislike her for being better.
206	20	"Rosa – Sessão 4"	TBA
Rosa's younger daughter (Mariana Carvalho) admits she's been doing therapy with an AI model and claims her mother is never around. Rosa apologizes for being absent and comforts both daughters. Later, she and Caio discuss some of his patients until Caio notices Rosa is visibly uncomfortable. After he insists that she says what is going on, she finally admits that he has the same name of he psychologist who treated her ex-husband Laureano 14 years ago and allegedly told him to leave his family. Caio says it is impossible that he is the same because he would not forget an uncommon name like Laureano. Still, Rosa decides to suspend their work together.
207	21	"Erica – Sessão 5"	TBA
Caio has another dream of his teenage daughter, who talks about the myth of Demeter and Persephone. Later, Erica speaks about the pressures of being a mother in today's society and the two end up once more discussing whether they are doing therapy or supervision after Erica accuses Caio of going from the latter to the former. Arthur knocks at Caio's door as soon as she leaves and says she's been different. He also says his father also started to behave differently after his mother died. Caio asks him what did he ultimately want by going there and Arthur leaves without an answer.
208	22	"Morena – Sessão 5"	TBA
Miguel pays Caio a visit and says he plans to introduce him to his girlfriend's sister. Caio jokes about the possibility of two brothers dating two sisters. Later, Morena says her father had a breakdown in the middle of the night at the nursery home and assaulted fellow patients, who wanted to press charges against him, which outraged her. She is also frustrated that she only learned about the incident the next morning and considers bringing her father back home, commenting on how sad it must be to wake up in an unrecognizable place not knowing one's own name. She asks Caio whether she should wait and Caio avoids answering it himself. After she insists, he recommends she waits a week and she leaves in a hurry.
209	23	"Ulisses – Sessão 5"	TBA
Ulisses bought a few gifts for his grandson, but decides not to give them anymore mid-session. He comments about his mother and how she always wanted to play several roles, including the role of a grandparent which should be his. He also complains that she reprehended him for the partying incident, warning that he is bringing shame to their family. In the end, after they discuss these issues, he ultimately decides to come by Alberto and hand in the gifts.
210	24	"Ingrid – Sessão 5"	TBA
Ingrid gave Caio a multi-session worth payment from her bonus, acknowledging him as influential in her performance, but Caio returns it claiming her recognition is enough. She says her sister was involved in a DUI car accident after leaving a party with their father's car and Caio suggests she is again having to be the "good daughter" in opposition to her less well behaved sister. By the end of the session, Ingrid receives an answer from the company she was applying for, but refuses to open it right away. Caio insists and says he will be there for her. She opens the message and is elated to learn she is hired.
211	25	"Théo – Sessão 5"	TBA
Caio seeks Théo for his supervision. He tells him of his dreams with his daughter, says he envies Rosa for her children and wishes his daughter was back. Théo reminds him that is impossible and they decide to carry on together. After Caio leaves, Théo opens a gift left by a previous patient and unpacks a mug. His daughter Malu comes and reminds him of his doctor advising against drinking coffee.
212	26	"Erica – Sessão 6"	TBA
Guido shows up again, admits he was wrong and asks Caio for help. An emotional Caio says Mari is the most important person for him and asks him to take care of her. Later, Erica comes, talks about her patients and eventually asks if Caio is not going to discuss Arthur's visit. Later, she finally verbalizes she doesn't really want to be a mother and never had such will. She then talks about mother behavior and asks him if he knows of a mother who would abandon her own children, and he mentions his mother.
213	27	"Morena – Sessão 6"	TBA
Morena goes back to the mutual aid group for people with relatives suffering from Alzheimer. She claims therapy has helped her changing the way she faces the pain and that resulted in her finally telling her experience at a group session. At first she didn't want to reveal who her father was in order to preserve his privacy and legacy, but eventually conceded that the disease is part of his story and, therefore, his identity. She receives a call from the nursing home mid-session request her permission to promote a special visit by some dance students, but Morena is reluctant about people visiting a Sorriso that is no longer the one who became famous. Morena also reflects that after three years focusing on her father, she is left with no hobbies nor close friends that could miss her, but that her father is the only person she wished would miss her.
214	28	"Ulisses – Sessão 6"	TBA
Miguel visits Caio and says they cannot decide Mari's life for her. Later, Ulisses says he finally visited his grandson and was invited in. He talked to his son about his father and tells Caio that when he was fifteen, his father took him to a sex professional for him to "become a man". He also reveals he's willing to finally visit his unborn child's grave, which Caio endorses.
215	29	"Ingrid – Sessão 6"	TBA
Ingrid tells Caio about her first week at the new job. She was sexually harassed by an important client but chose not to report it to HR in order to keep a low profile. She also met and slept with Mauricio, her former and only ex-boyfriend, and says he once told her she could overcome her father and that would upset him, which annoyed her. Caio comments that she seems reluctant to admit that she could indeed do better than her father and that for some reason she always perceives compliments and acts of love as containing hidden agendas. Caio then asks if her father congratulated her on the new job and wonders why does she wait for a reaction that will never come. Ingrid tells Caio of hardships her father faced and Caio asks why does she have to blame herself for this, which enrages her and results in her ranting at Caio about the deaths of his wife and daughter, which she learned about on the news. She apologizes after calming down and mentions that her father had a Saturn Devouring His Son on the wall, which Mauricio said was "symbolic" for him to have. Caio concludes by saying it is OK to be a Saturn's child and that in order to grow up, one may have to leave their childhood's father back in childhood.
216	30	"Théo – Sessão 6"	TBA
Caio dreams of his daughter again and she congratulates him on how she handled Ingrid in the previous session. Later, Théo says his children are helping him deal with an undisclosed disease and says he was "canceled" at a congress for an undisclosed joke, wondering if people are no longer allowed to make mistakes and if the elderly are prohibited from expressing themselves. When discussing Caio's patients, Théo says he handled Ingrid with elegance. Later, he questions why Caio doesn't want to go to the ranch his mother left him as inheritance and wonders what memories is he afraid of reliving there.
217	31	"Érica – Sessão 7"	TBA
Erica has finally decided not to have children and is resolute about her non-motherhood. She also reveals progress with some of her patients.
218	32	"Morena – Sessão 7"	TBA
Morena decided to give thumbs up to the dance students visiting her father and she was moved with the tribute they prepared for him. She also allows herself to connect more with her love interest Leco and her coworker Gislaine. Mari reveals she's back with Guido, which Caio reluctantly supports.
219	33	"Ulisses – Sessão 7"	TBA
Malu pays Caio a visit and reveals Théo has leukemia, which is why he shouldn't be having sessions anymore. Caio says he wasn't aware and that he will pay Théo one final visit to finish their work. Later, Ulisses says he finally mustered up some courage to visit Berenice's and his unborn child's grave, and that once there, he "cried everything he didn't cry before". He also says he now feels ready to be a father and grandfather and that he will move out to a place farther from his mother.
220	34	"Ingrid – Sessão 7"	TBA
Ingrid says she finally confronted her father after he gave little importance to a serious mistake she made at work, which was hopefully fixed and caused no tension with her boss. Caio suggests she and Maya basically grew up caring for each other and that she is angry at everyone so she doesn't target such anger at her father.
221	36	"Ingrid – Sessão 7"	TBA
Mari, Guido, their child and Miguel pay Caio a visit. Later, he tells Théo that "Eliza's father" has finally died and bids him farewell. He later goes back to Rosa, where he tells her about his father, including the day he got lost from him at Copan. Later, Caio is seen driving to the ranch with visions of his daughter in the car.

== Awards and nominations ==
Year	Award	Category	Nominated	Outcome	Reference
2014	Prêmio F5	Série ou Minissérie do Ano	Sessão de Terapia	Nominated	
2014	Prêmio F5	Ator do Ano (série ou minissérie)	Zécarlos Machado	Nominated	
2014	Prêmio F5	Atriz do Ano (série ou minissérie)	Letícia Sabatella	Nominated	
