= Cursinho =

Brazilian cram school

Cursinho (Portuguese pronunciation: [kuʁˈsĩɲu], "little course", also called curso pré-vestibular [ˈkuʁsu ˌpɾɛvestʃibuˈlaʁ] or curso preparatório [ˈkuʁsu pɾeˌpaɾaˈtɔɾju]) is a type of cram school, usually private, in many Brazilian cities, and attended by students trying to qualify for university admission through entrance exams (vestibular), or by people willing to take a public examination to work as a public servant. These last for three months, in general.

Cursinhos pré-vestibular always have extensive and semi-extensive courses, extensive courses taking place during most of the year, and semi-extensive ones taking place during the second semester, while the exact month to start may vary.

Most of them revise the subjects that the students need to know to take the vast majority of the vestibulares: Mathematics, Portuguese language (literature and grammar), History, Geography, Biology, Physics, Chemistry and English language. Some still offer extra classes for deeper studies on specific subjects, current news (which may be required in some of the vestibulares) and techniques on writing an essay, which is required in all vestibulares.

It is also common to separate the students by the area of knowledge they wish to study in the university (humanities, exact sciences and biological sciences), providing a deeper study in different subjects accordingly with the area (History and Geography; Mathematics, Physics and Chemistry; Biology and Chemistry respectively, with similar focus on Portuguese and English for all groups).
