= Vestibular exam =

Brazilian university entrance examination

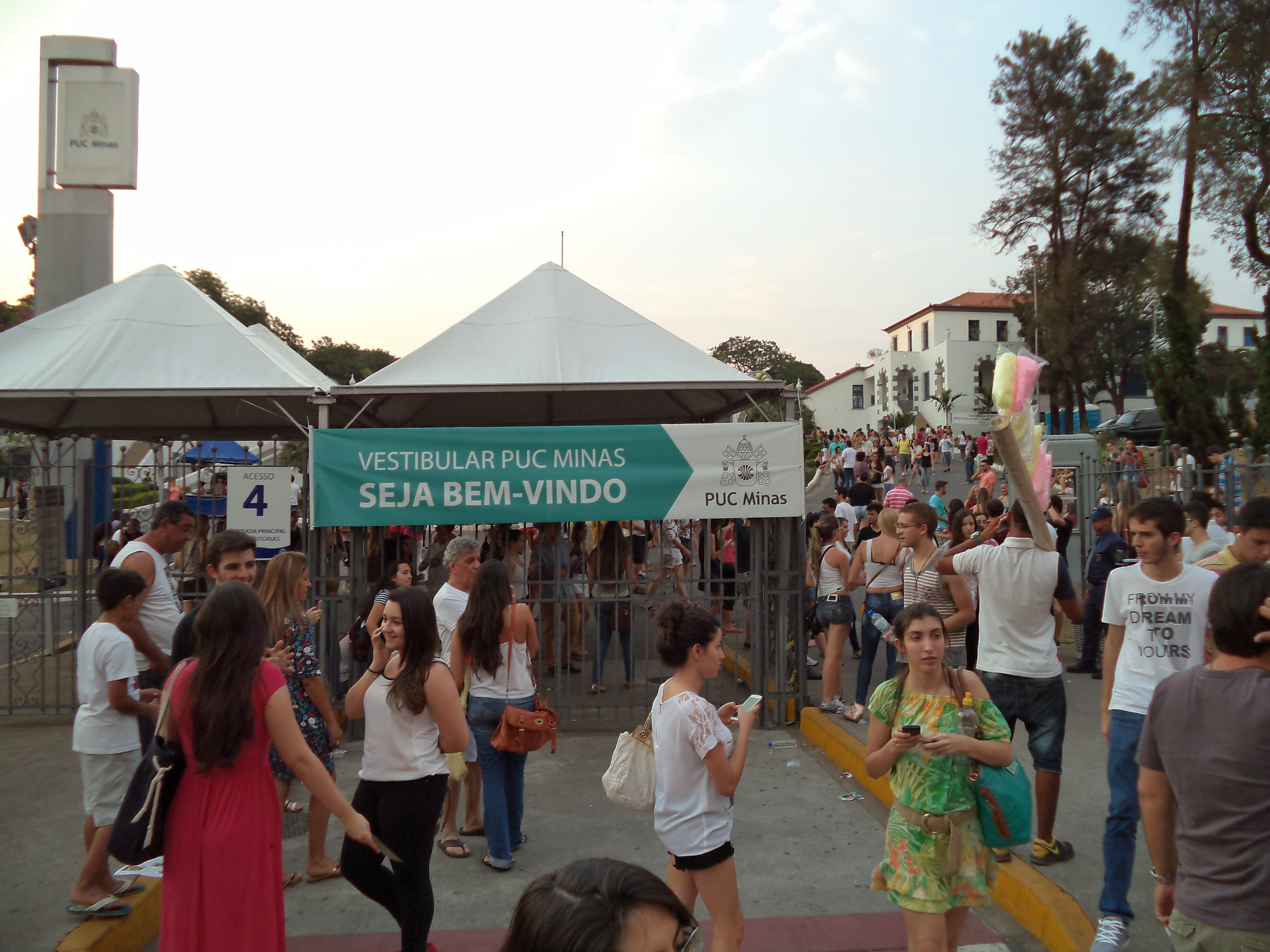
Entrance to the Coração Eucarístico campus of the PUC Minas during the Vestibular in 2014.

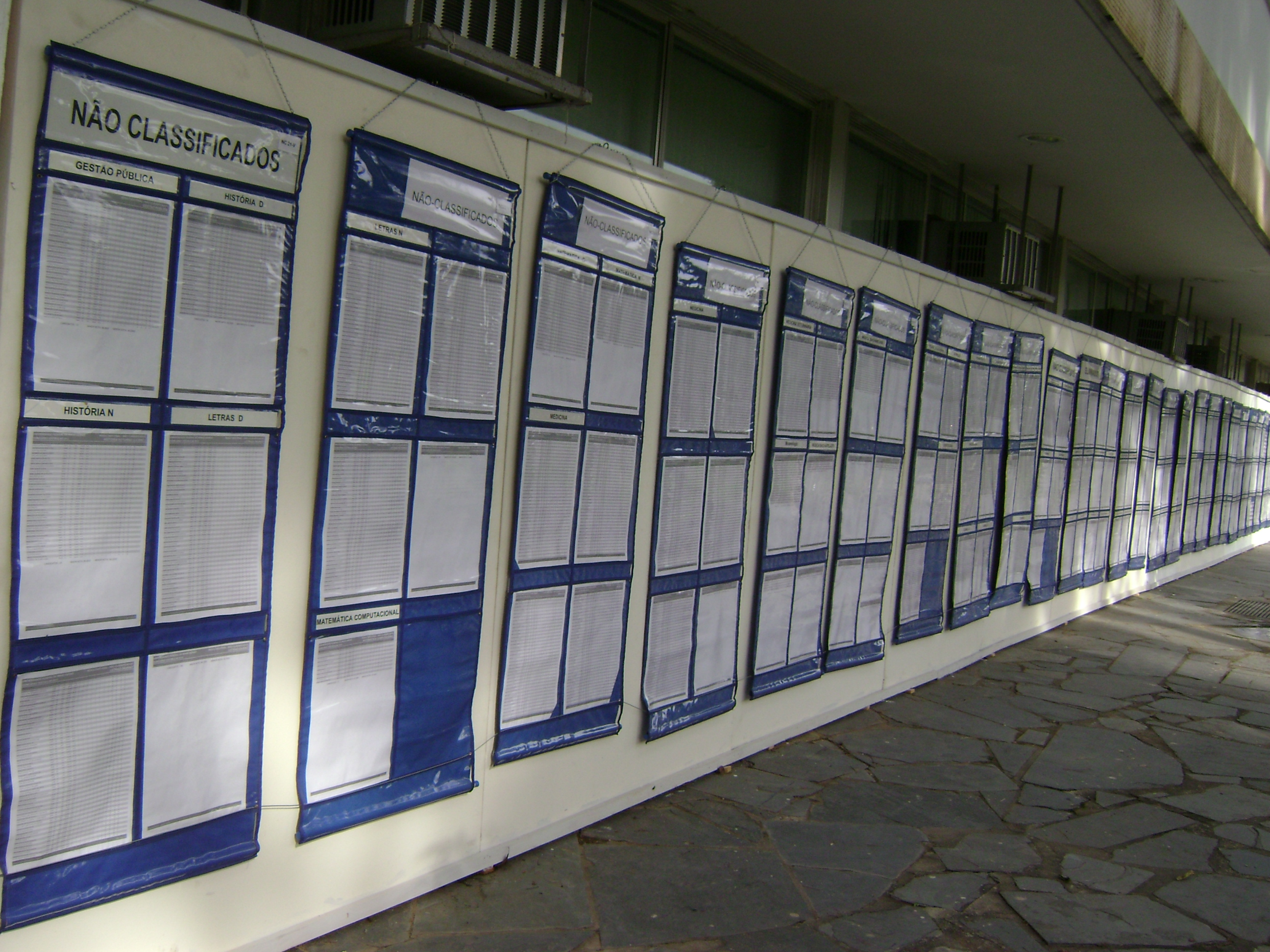
Banners listing the scores of candidates for the 2010 UFMG Vestibular, posted in front of the rector's office.

The Vestibular (from Portuguese: vestíbulo, "entrance hall") is a competitive examination and is the primary and widespread entrance system used by Brazilian universities to select the students admitted.

The Vestibular usually takes place from November to January, right before the start of school year in February or March, although certain universities hold it every semester. The exams often span several days, usually two, with different disciplines being tested each day.

== Structure ==
Several Brazilian universities follow the FUVEST (University of São Paulo's entry exam) pattern, which is divided into two stages or "phases". The first stage consists of 90 multiple choice questions, including subjects such as Portuguese Language, Portuguese Literature and Brazilian Literature; Math, History, Geography, Biology, Physics, Chemistry and Foreign Language. The answers are marked on an answer card, and they are graded afterwards by an automated optical reader. Some institutions establish a cutoff score for the first stage. Students who score below that are automatically eliminated and do not proceed to the second stage, even if the maximum number of candidates has not been reached, although some schools make exceptions in the rare case of most candidates scoring below the cutoff.

In some universities, the Vestibular may include only a single-stage exam where the scores for each subject tested are adjusted by weights depending on the student's course choice. For example, on the Brazilians unities of PUC (known as one of the most prestigious private universities in Brazil) has a Vestibular consisting of 45 multiple choice questions, one written question about Chemistry and Biology, one about Maths and Physics, and another about History and Geography, in addition to a student-written essay on a provided theme. All of that is done in one single day. Another example is Mackenzie, considered one of the best private universities in the country: its Vestibular consists of 60 multiple choice questions and a student-written essay.

In some military engineering colleges such as ITA and IME, the Vestibular includes exams in Math, Physics, Chemistry, Portuguese and English only. Those exams are mostly write-in and demand more from the students when compared to ordinary Vestibular exams of the same subjects by other universities, being heavily influenced by mathematics competitions questions. In the other hand, colleges with a humanities focused curriculum, such as ESPM, only include Portuguese, English, History, Geography, Math and culture. This is done in order to let the student focus on the subjects of the college's interest while preparing for the exams.

University candidates must choose their majors by the time they sign in for the Vestibular, and they cannot change their choice except through a very bureaucratic process of internal transfers within the university. Some exceptions exist, such as Engineering in some universities, where the engineering major is chosen only after a three or four semester period. In the Polytechnic School of the University of São Paulo, for example, students choose their majors by the time they sign in for the Vestibular, but they can change their major (only between the courses offered in the Polytechnic School) whenever they want, after two semesters taken, and as long as there are places available, by the internal transfer system, which instead of the usual, is very organised and accessible.

Throughout the last decades, there has always been a gap between the few vacancies offered and the overwhelmingly high and growing demand for high quality and tuition-free public universities. The competition goes as far as having more than 150 candidates per vacancy for the most sought-after careers, such as medicine.

== Origin ==
The Vestibular was implanted primarily as a way to prevent nepotism or some other form of unfair or beneficial selection of candidates. It was considered by law the only authorized selection method until 1996, when the new Education Law was passed.

== Criticism ==
While the Vestibular is generally considered to be a fair and unbiased system to select students due to the standardized nature of the tests, there are a few controversies surrounding it.

There is some criticism to the alleged standardization of the high school curriculum for the whole country to match the Vestibular agenda. As with most types of academic evaluation, the Vestibular suffers from the same limitations as a regular test, that is, factors such as stress come into play. It also seems to favor candidates that come from a wealthier background, who had access to better and deeper education in private schools, as opposed to the comparatively poor public high school educational system, although many university boards claim that it doesn't matter which background the candidates have, since their Vestibular aims to select the best students based solely on their knowledge.

To ease this problem, some universities such as the Federal University of Minas Gerais, provide a 10–15% bonus for students who received their middle and high education in public schools. There is also the alternative of taking classes at cram schools called cursinhos (a Brazilian word that usually means "Vestibular course"). Those are revisions of Vestibular subjects, given through periods of 9 months (the regular year-long one), 6 months (the semi-intensive one), and 3 months (known as intensive). These courses are given usually for the most prestigious schools and can be done after concluding high school or as a complement of the last year of it.

== Racial quotas ==
Racial quotas and social quotas are a very controversial subject in Brazil. They were implemented by the government as an attempt to minimize the gap between students. That way, students who had their high school education entirely at public schools get quotas. Also, African and Indigenous Brazilian descendants gain a small percentage of bonuses on their Vestibular. That is considered an affirmative action policy.

=== Court challenge ===
In August 2005, at Universidade Federal do Paraná, a student was granted by a federal court the right to be admitted at the university because she had a better score on the Vestibular than several other freshmen that took advantage of their quotas. In 2012 a law was approved that gave quotas to students who came from public schools. The federal universities (such as UFRJ, UNIFESP, UFPR, UFRGS...) will have to save half of the vacancies for those students. Public establishments, such as the University of São Paulo, are not currently forced to abide by this law. In spite of this, the majority of public universities in Brazil adopt the social and racial quotas.

== New ENEM (Novo ENEM) ==
The Ministry of Education and Culture of Brazil (MEC) proposed in 2009 that the universities should use the ENEM (National High School Exam), a non-mandatory national exam, as a standard university entrance qualification test. The "new ENEM", as it is known, is composed of 180 multiple choice questions in five main areas (natural sciences, human sciences, math, Portuguese and either English or Spanish as a foreign language) and an essay.

The proposal's main objective is to democratize access to higher education, opportunities for federal jobs, academic mobility and induce the restructuring of the curricula of high school.

The universities have the autonomy to choose whether or not they want to use the exam, and if they want to, they can also choose the way it is used:

- As a single phase, with a unified system of selection, electronic and online
- As the first phase
- Combined with the university's test (using it to admit only part of its students or as part of the overall grade, along with a Vestibular)
- As a single phase for the remaining chairs

== See also ==
- Cursinho
- Concurso público

General:

- Brazil university rankings
- Universities and higher education in Brazil
