= List of Brazilian submissions for the Academy Award for Best International Feature Film =

Best International Feature Film submissions from Brazil

Highlights
- Debut: 1960
- Submissions: 56
- Nominations: 6
- Oscar winners: 1

Brazil has submitted films for the Academy Award for Best International Feature Film (Note: The category was previously named the Academy Award for Best Foreign Language Film, but this was changed to the Academy Award for Best International Feature Film in April 2019, after the Academy deemed the word "Foreign" to be outdated.) since 1960. The award is handed out annually by the United States–based Academy of Motion Picture Arts and Sciences to a feature length motion picture produced outside the U.S. that contains primarily non-English language dialogue. It was not created until the 1956 Academy Awards, in which a competitive Academy Award of Merit was created for non-English speaking films, and has been given annually since.

As of 2026, Brazil has been nominated six times, winning once for I'm Still Here (2024).

== History ==
At the 1959 ceremony, Black Orpheus, a Portuguese language film shot on location in Rio de Janeiro with a large Brazilian cast and crew, won the award representing France. Since the film was directed by French filmmaker Marcel Camus and produced by French companies, the film was able to be nominated as France's official submission.

In 1986, Kiss of the Spider Woman by Héctor Babenco became the first Brazilian co-production to get nominated for Best Picture. However, it was ineligible to be selected as the official submission because it was mostly in English.

=== Statistics ===
Seven films directed by Carlos Diegues (also known as Cacá Diegues) were chosen to represent Brazil, more than any other filmmaker. Followed by Nelson Pereira dos Santos and Walter Salles, with four each.

Three films by Bruno Barreto were submitted, although his biggest box-office success, Dona Flor and Her Two Husbands (1976), was not chosen. His 1997 drama film Four Days in September was nominated at the 70th Academy Awards.

Three films by Kleber Mendonça Filho were submitted, even though some of his most popular productions (Aquarius and Bacurau) were famously snubbed.

Suzana Amaral's Hour of the Star (1987) was the first film directed by a woman to be submitted. Only twenty-nine years later another film directed by a female filmmaker was selected as the Brazilian's entry: Anna Muylaert's The Second Mother (2015). Four years later, Babenco: Tell Me When I Die (2019), by Bárbara Paz became the third and last, as of 2026.

Gabriel Martins's Mars One (2022) marked the first film directed by a Black filmmaker to be chosen as the country submission.

Number of submissions	Name	Films
7	Carlos Diegues	Xica, Bye Bye Brazil, Subway to the Stars, Better Days Ahead, Tieta of Agreste, Orfeu and The Great Mystical Circus
4	Nelson Pereira dos Santos	How Tasty Was My Little Frenchman, The Amulet of Ogum, Tenda dos Milagres and Memoirs of Prison
4	Walter Salles	A Grande Arte, Central Station, Behind the Sun and I'm Still Here
3	Bruno Barreto	The Story of Fausta, Four Days in September and Last Stop 174
3	Kleber Mendonça Filho	Neighbouring Sounds, Pictures of Ghosts and The Secret Agent

== Submissions ==
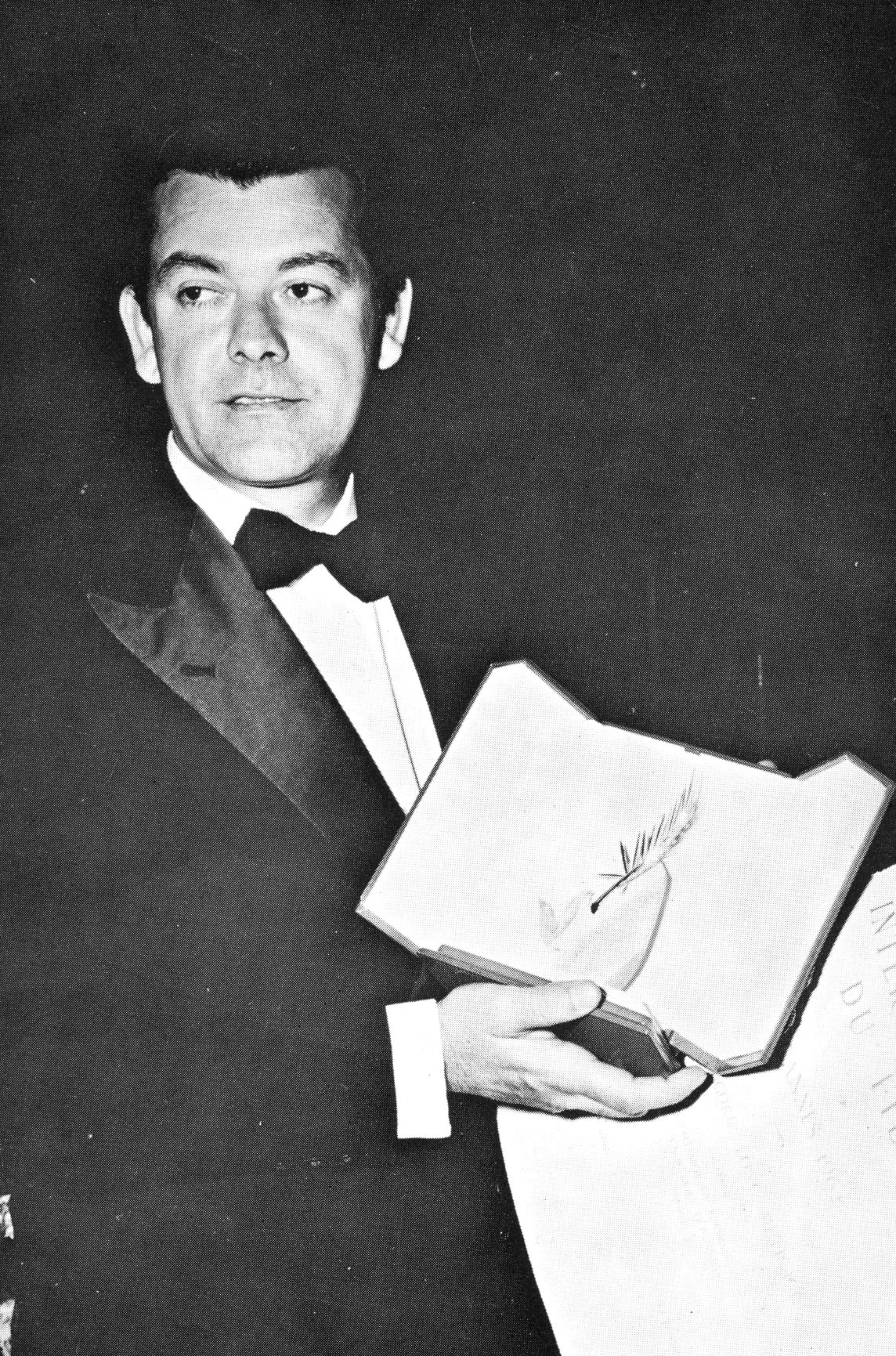
Anselmo Duarte's O Pagador de Promessas was the first Brazilian film to receive a nomination in the category. The film had won the Palme d'Or in 1962.

O Pagador de Promessas or (Keeper of Promises, 1962), directed by Anselmo Duarte, was the first Brazilian submission nominated for Best Foreign Language Film, at the 35th Academy Awards.

At the 71st Academy Awards, Central Station (1998) received a nomination, alongside Fernanda Montenegro in the Best Actress category. It marked the first nomination for a Brazilian actress in an acting category.

At the 75th Academy Awards, even though City of God (2002) was selected as the Brazilian submission, the film was famously snubbed and the decision was met with heavy criticism, since it was considered the category's front-runner. In the subsequent year, at the 76th Academy Awards, the film was nominated in four categories: Best Director for Fernando Meirelles, Best Adapted Screenplay for Bráulio Mantovani, Best Cinematography for César Charlone, and Best Film Editing for Daniel Rezende.

At the 97th Academy Awards, Brazil won the award for the first time with I'm Still Here (2024), while the film was also nominated for Best Picture and Best Actress for Fernanda Torres, marking the first time that a Brazilian film, shot in Portuguese, was nominated for Best Picture.

At the 98th Academy Awards, The Secret Agent (2025) was nominated in the category alongside nominations for Best Picture, Best Casting, and Best Actor for Wagner Moura, marking the first nomination for a Brazilian male acting category and the second year in a row that a Brazilian film was nominated for Best Picture.

The Brazilian nominee is selected by a committee of the Academia Brasileira de Cinema since 2017.

Most of the films are primary in Brazilian Portuguese, with the exception of Cinema, Aspirins and Vultures (2005), which is mainly in German despite being set in the Brazilian Northeast region. Below is a list of the films that have been submitted for consideration.

Year (Ceremony)	Film title used in nomination	Original title	Language(s)	Director(s)	Result
1960 (33rd)	Death Commands Brigandage	A Morte Comanda o Cangaço	Brazilian Portuguese	Carlos Coimbra and Walter Guimarães Motta	Not nominated
1962 (35th)	Keeper of Promises	O Pagador de Promessas	Brazilian Portuguese	Anselmo Duarte	Nominated
1964 (37th)	Black God, White Devil	Deus e o Diabo na Terra do Sol	Brazilian Portuguese	Glauber Rocha	Not nominated
1965 (38th)	São Paulo, Incorporated	São Paulo, Sociedade Anônima	Brazilian Portuguese	Luis Sérgio Person	Not nominated
1967 (40th)	Case of the Naves Brothers	O Caso dos Irmãos Naves	Brazilian Portuguese	Luis Sérgio Person	Not nominated
1968 (41st)	The Amorous Ones	As Amorosas	Brazilian Portuguese	Walter Hugo Khouri	Not nominated
1969 (42nd)	Antonio das Mortes	O Dragão da Maldade contra o Santo Guerreiro	Brazilian Portuguese	Glauber Rocha	Not nominated
1970 (43rd)	Mortal Sin	Pecado Mortal	Brazilian Portuguese	Miguel Faria Jr.	Not nominated
1971 (44th)	Pra Quem Fica, Tchau		Brazilian Portuguese	Reginaldo Faria	Not nominated
1972 (45th)	How Tasty Was My Little Frenchman	Como Era Gostoso o Meu Francês	Portuguese, French, Tupi	Nelson Pereira dos Santos	Not nominated
1973 (46th)	João and the Knife	A Faca e o Rio	Brazilian Portuguese	George Sluizer	Not nominated
1974 (47th)	The Scarecrow's Night	A Noite do Espantalho	Brazilian Portuguese	Sérgio Ricardo	Not nominated
1975 (48th)	The Amulet of Ogum	O Amuleto de Ogum	Brazilian Portuguese	Nelson Pereira dos Santos	Not nominated
1976 (49th)	Xica	Xica da Silva	Brazilian Portuguese	Carlos Diegues	Not nominated
1977 (50th)	Tent of Miracles	Tenda dos Milagres	Brazilian Portuguese	Nelson Pereira dos Santos	Not nominated
1978 (51st)	The Lyre of Delight	A Lira do Delírio	Brazilian Portuguese	Walter Lima Jr.	Not nominated
1980 (53rd)	Bye Bye Brazil	Bye Bye Brasil	Brazilian Portuguese	Carlos Diegues	Not nominated
1981 (54th)	Pixote	Pixote: A Lei do Mais Fraco	Brazilian Portuguese	Héctor Babenco	Disqualified
1984 (57th)	Memoirs of Prison	Memórias do Cárcere	Brazilian Portuguese	Nelson Pereira dos Santos	Not nominated
1986 (59th)	Hour of the Star	A Hora da Estrela	Brazilian Portuguese	Suzana Amaral	Not nominated
1987 (60th)	Subway to the Stars	Um Trem para as Estrelas	Brazilian Portuguese	Carlos Diegues	Not nominated
1988 (61st)	The Story of Fausta	Romance da Empregada	Brazilian Portuguese	Bruno Barreto	Not nominated
1989 (62nd)	Better Days Ahead	Dias Melhores Virão	Brazilian Portuguese	Carlos Diegues	Not nominated
1991 (64th)	Exposure	A Grande Arte	Brazilian Portuguese, English, Spanish	Walter Salles	Not nominated
1995 (68th)	O Quatrilho		Brazilian Portuguese	Fábio Barreto	Nominated
1996 (69th)	Tieta of Agreste	Tieta do Agreste	Brazilian Portuguese	Carlos Diegues	Not nominated
1997 (70th)	Four Days in September	O Que é Isso, Companheiro?	Brazilian Portuguese	Bruno Barreto	Nominated
1998 (71st)	Central Station	Central do Brasil	Brazilian Portuguese	Walter Salles	Nominated
1999 (72nd)	Orfeu		Brazilian Portuguese	Carlos Diegues	Not nominated
2000 (73rd)	Me, You, Them	Eu, Tu, Eles	Brazilian Portuguese	Andrucha Waddington	Not nominated
2001 (74th)	Behind the Sun	Abril Despedaçado	Brazilian Portuguese	Walter Salles	Not nominated
2002 (75th)	City of God	Cidade de Deus	Brazilian Portuguese	Fernando Meirelles	Not nominated
2003 (76th)	Carandiru		Brazilian Portuguese	Héctor Babenco	Not nominated
2004 (77th)	Olga		Brazilian Portuguese	Jayme Monjardim	Not nominated
2005 (78th)	Two Sons of Francisco	Dois Filhos de Francisco	Brazilian Portuguese	Breno Silveira	Not nominated
2006 (79th)	Cinema, Aspirins and Vultures	Cinema, Aspirinas e Urubus	German, Brazilian Portuguese	Marcelo Gomes	Not nominated
2007 (80th)	The Year My Parents Went on Vacation	O Ano em que Meus Pais Saíram de Férias	Brazilian Portuguese, Yiddish, Hebrew	Cao Hamburger	Made shortlist
2008 (81st)	Last Stop 174	Última Parada 174	Brazilian Portuguese	Bruno Barreto	Not nominated
2009 (82nd)	Time of Fear	Salve Geral	Brazilian Portuguese	Sérgio Rezende	Not nominated
2010 (83rd)	Lula, Son of Brazil	Lula: O Filho do Brasil	Brazilian Portuguese	Fábio Barreto	Not nominated
2011 (84th)	Elite Squad: The Enemy Within	Tropa de Elite 2: O Inimigo Agora é Outro	Brazilian Portuguese	José Padilha	Not nominated
2012 (85th)	The Clown	O Palhaço	Brazilian Portuguese	Selton Mello	Not nominated
2013 (86th)	Neighbouring Sounds	O Som ao Redor	Brazilian Portuguese	Kleber Mendonça Filho	Not nominated
2014 (87th)	The Way He Looks	Hoje Eu Quero Voltar Sozinho	Brazilian Portuguese	Daniel Ribeiro	Not nominated
2015 (88th)	The Second Mother	Que Horas Ela Volta?	Brazilian Portuguese	Anna Muylaert	Not nominated
2016 (89th)	Little Secret	Pequeno Segredo	Brazilian Portuguese, English	David Schurmann	Not nominated
2017 (90th)	Bingo: The King of the Mornings	Bingo: O Rei das Manhãs	Brazilian Portuguese	Daniel Rezende	Not nominated
2018 (91st)	The Great Mystical Circus	O Grande Circo Místico	Brazilian Portuguese	Carlos Diegues	Not nominated
2019 (92nd)	The Invisible Life of Eurídice Gusmão	A Vida Invisível de Eurídice Gusmão	Brazilian Portuguese	Karim Aïnouz	Not nominated
2020 (93rd)	Babenco: Tell Me When I Die	Babenco – Alguém Tem que Ouvir o Coração e Dizer: Parou	Brazilian Portuguese	Bárbara Paz	Not nominated
2021 (94th)	Private Desert	Deserto Particular	Brazilian Portuguese	Aly Muritiba	Not nominated
2022 (95th)	Mars One	Marte Um	Brazilian Portuguese	Gabriel Martins	Not nominated
2023 (96th)	Pictures of Ghosts	Retratos Fantasmas	Brazilian Portuguese	Kleber Mendonça Filho	Not nominated
2024 (97th)	I'm Still Here	Ainda Estou Aqui	Brazilian Portuguese	Walter Salles	Won Academy Award
2025 (98th)	The Secret Agent	O Agente Secreto	Brazilian Portuguese, German	Kleber Mendonça Filho	Nominated
2026 (99th)	Gugu's World	Feito Pipa	Brazilian Portuguese	Allan Deberton	Pending

== Shortlisted films ==
Following a number of controversies, since 2022, Brazil has announced a list of finalists that varied in number over the years (from 5 to 6 films) before announcing its official submission. The following films have been shortlisted:

Year	Films
2022	Charcoal · A Mãe · Pedro, Between the Devil and the Deep Blue Sea · Pacified · Paloma
2023	Alien Nights · Our Dream · A Strange Path · Toll · Vultures
2024	Bittersweet Rain · Cidade; Campo · Heartless · Motel Destino · Power Alley
2025	Baby · The Blue Trail · Manas · Same Old West · White House
2026	100 Days · The Fabulous Time Machine · The Nature of Invisible Things · On Behalf of My Son · Our Secret

== See also ==
- List of Academy Award winners and nominees for Best International Feature Film
- List of Academy Awards nominations for Brazilian films
- Cinema of Brazil

== Notes ==
a: Also known as The Given Word and The Promise in the English-speaking market.
b: Central do Brasil was also nominated for the Academy Award for Best Actress. The film's lead actress, Fernanda Montenegro, held the title as the only Brazilian nominated in an acting category until her daughter, Fernanda Torres, was nominated in 2025.
c: Cidade de Deus was submitted for the 75th Academy Awards, but it was not nominated for the Best Foreign Language Film award. The film, however, was eventually nominated for four awards—Best Director, Best Cinematography, Best Adapted Screenplay, and Best Film Editing—at the following ceremony. It shares the title with Kiss of the Spider Woman as the Brazilian film with the highest number of nominations. All of Cidade de Deus nominees were Brazilian, while Hector Babenco was the only Brazilian nominee for Kiss of the Spider Woman, an American co-production.
d: Ainda Estou Aqui was also nominated for the Academy Awards for Best Picture and Best Actress.
e: O Agente Secreto was also nominated for the Academy Awards for Best Picture, Best Actor and Best Casting.
