= Bruna Linzmeyer =

Brazilian actress (born 1992)

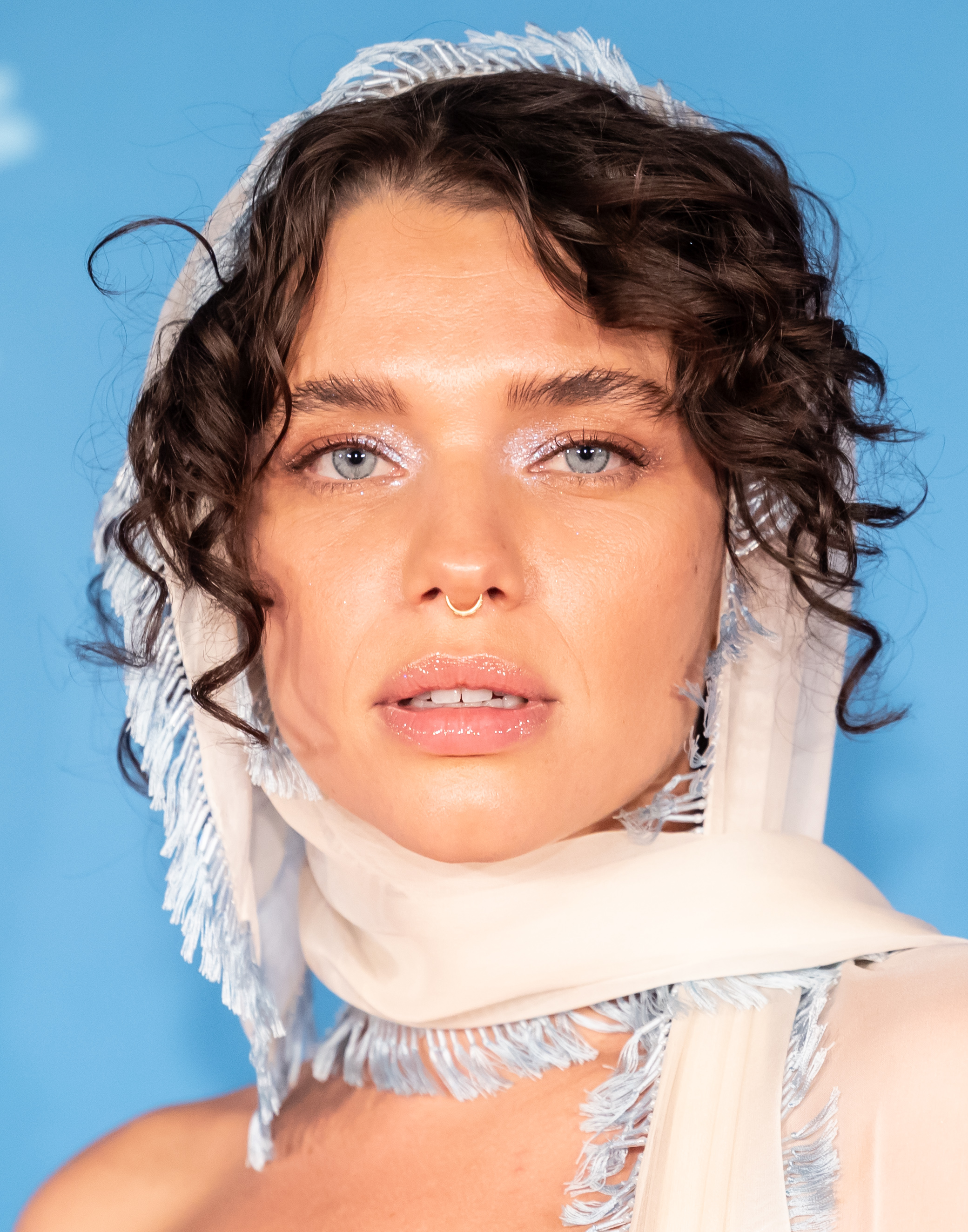
- Linzmeyer at the 74th Berlin International Film Festival in 2024
- Born: November 11, 1992 (age 33); Corupá, Santa Catarina, Brazil
- Occupation: Actress
- Years active: 2010–present

Bruna Linzmeyer (born November 11, 1992) is a Brazilian actress also known for her activism in support of LGBTQIA+ and feminist rights.

== Early life and education ==
Linzmeyer was born on November 11 in Corupá, a small town in the south Brazilian countryside in the state of Santa Catarina. Her father has worked his whole professional life in a connector factory, and her mother has had many different experiences, from working as a secretary in factories and in the city's main catholic church to assisting people as a medium in a spiritism center and as a reiki therapist. Linzmeyer has one brother, ten years older, who works in a bank.

She doesn't have artists in her family and becoming an actress had never been a dream of hers. She wanted to leave the countryside since she was a teenager. As her family didn't have the financial resources to make it happen for her, she accepted to work as a model. When Linzmeyer was 15 years old, she won a beauty contest named Garota Verão, promoted by the Grupo RBS, which is TV Globo's subsidiary in Santa Catarina and one year later she moved to São Paulo to have better job prospects. While living there, she studied theater at Globe Company. Unfortunately, during this time, she couldn't make any money as a model and her parents couldn't support her financially anymore. Linzmeyer thought then working on TV Globo would give her enough money to keep living out of her hometown. So, she asked the model agency to get her some auditions for TV roles as an actress. Linzmeyer was chosen in her first audition to do a TV series at TV Globo and moved to Rio de Janeiro.

She studied at public schools and attended PUC-Rio (one of the largest and most prestigious private universities in Brazil) to study history, but she hasn't finished it. When it comes to her artistic training, she's been doing different open courses, but Linzmeyer is quite self-taught as well.

== Career ==
Bruna Linzmeyer started playing a Russian character named Tatiana Dovichenko in the 2010 TV Globo miniseries called Afinal, o Que Querem as Mulheres?, written-directed by Luiz Fernando Carvalho. Since then, she has built a solid career in cinema and TV.

Linzmeyer played several emblematic roles on TV. For instance, an autistic girl named Linda (who faces her family to have a more autonomous life) in the 2013 TV Globo telenovela Amor à Vida. Also, the sweet Professora Juliana, (a teacher who moves to the countryside, but when she decides to teach the adult workers of a local farm how to read and write, the a conservative colonel order her to be killed) who is the lead character, in the 2014 remake of the telenovela Meu Pedacinho de Chão. Bruna Linzmeyer plays Cibele Dantas in the 2017 telenovela A Força do Querer, by Glória Perez, one of the eight main characters of the telenovela, who gets involved in a love triangle with Ísis Valverde and Fiuk characters. Finally, her most recent work in the popular Pantanal remake, where she starred as Madeleine (a rich woman from Rio de Janeiro who falls in love with a farm laborer and ends up moving with him to his hometown in Pantanal, an isolated place surrounded by forest and wild animals that she hates). For this job, Linzmeyer did a web series on her Instagram, called #MadeleineReality, sharing with her followers the development of her character. It was an innovative and successful project that attracted more than 30 million viewers.

When it comes to cinema, her debut was in the Brazilian version of the franchise Cities of Love. The episode she took part in, the anthology Rio, eu te amo, was directed by Carlos Saldanha and starred her and Rodrigo Santoro as well.

In The Cold Front Brought by the Rain, where she starred as a heroin addict called Amsterdam, her performance was praised.

In the epic The Great Mystical Circus, directed by Carlos Diegues, she plays a circus contortionist and the film premiered at the Cannes Film Festival.

In 2019 she won Felix Suzy Capó Award at Rio de Janeiro International Film Festival, the festival's queer award as Personality of the Year, due to her activism for the LGBTQIAP+ community.

In the acclaimed 2021 production A Wild Patience Has Taken Me Here, written-directed by Erica Sarmet, Linzmeyer won the Special Jury Award of the Sundance Film Festival with the ensemble cast for their performance in the film. They also collectively won the Best Interpretation award of the Mix Brasil Cinema Festival in São Paulo.

Regarding Medusa, a horror by Anita Rocha da Silveira, which premiered in the Directors' Fortnight at Cannes Film Festival, Linzmeyer portrayed a free woman whose face was burned since she was considered to be a slut by a group of conservative girls.

== Personal life ==
Bruna has ancestry of German, indigenous, African, Portuguese, and Spanish descendents.

Linzmeyer describes herself as sapatão-queer and lesbian.

== Filmography ==
=== Cinema ===
Year	Title	Director	Role	Ref
2013	Rio, Eu Te Amo (Segment: "Pas de Deux")	Carlos Saldanha	Ballet dancer	
2014	Autorretrato	Anna Costa e Silva	Anna Costa e Silva	
2014	Seewatchlook, O que você vê quando olha o que enxerga?	Michel Melamed	She	
2015	O Amuleto	Jeferson De	Diana	
2016	A Frente Fria que a Chuva Traz	Nevile D'Almeida	Amsterdã	
2017	The Movie of my Life	Selton Mello	Luna Madeira	
2018	O Banquete	Daniela Thomas	Cat Woman	
2018	The Great Mystical Circus	Carlos Diegues	Beatriz	
2018	O Que Resta	Fernanda Teixeira	Patrícia	
2019	Alfazema	Sabrina Fidalgo	Diabe	
2020	Alice & Só	Daniel Lieff	Alice	
2020	Doberman	Ernesto Solis		
2020	Escândalo	Yasmin Thayná e Lucílio Jota	Amanda	
2021	A Wild Patience Has Taken Me Here	Erica Sarmet	Rô	
2022	Medusa	Anita Rocha da Silveira	Melissa	
2024	Cidade; Campo	Juliana Rojas	Mara	World Premiere at the 74th Berlin International Film Festival
2024	Baby	Marcelo Caetano	Jana	

=== Television ===
Television
Year	Title	Author	Role	Notes
2010	Afinal, o Que Querem as Mulheres?	Luiz Fernando Carvalho	Russinha (Tatiana Dovichenko)	
2011	Insensato Coração	Gilberto Braga	Leila Alencar Machado	
2012	As Brasileiras	Gregorio Duvivier e Clarice Falcão	Clara	Episode: A Vidente de Diamantina
2012	Gabriela	Walcyr Carrasco	Anabela Fernandes Prado	
2013	Seewatchlook		Various	
2013-2014	Amor à Vida	Walcyr Carrasco	Linda	
2014	Meu Pedacinho de Chão	Benedito Ruy Barbosa	Teacher Juliana	
2015-2016	A Regra do Jogo	João Emanuel Carneiro	Belisa Stewart	
2017	A Força do Querer	Gloria Perez	Cibele Dantas	
2018	Pega Pega	Claudia Souto	Police officer	One episode
2018	Quebrando o Tabu		Herself	Episode: "LGBT Fobia"
2018-2019	O Sétimo Guardião	Aguinaldo Silva	Lourdes Maria	
2022	Pantanal	Bruno Luperi	Young Madeleine	12 episodes
2023	Notícias Populares	Marcelo Caetano	Rata	Episode: "Fogo Amigo"
2023	Drag Race Brasil	Reality show	Guest judge	Episode: "Brazilian Festivals Ball"
2025	Máscaras de Oxigênio (não) Cairão Automaticamente		Léa	

=== Theater ===
Year	Play	Author	Ref.
2011	Seewatchlook	Michel Melamed	
2012	Adeus à Carne	Michel Melamed	

=== Web ===
Year	Title	Note	Ref
2016	Jantar Secreto	Booktrailer	

== Discography ==
=== Single ===
Year	Title	Label	Ref
2015	Aqui é a Belisa	Som Livre	

== Awards and nominations ==
Year	Award	Category	Work	Result	Ref
2011	Prêmio Contigo! de TV	Best TV Newcomer Actress	Afinal, o Que Querem as Mulheres?	Nominated	
2011	Prêmio Qualidade Brasil	Best Newcomer in a TV Series or miniseries	Afinal, o Que Querem as Mulheres?	Won	
2011	Prêmio Qualidade Brasil	Best Telenovela Newcomer Actress	Insensato Coração	Nominated	
2011	Prêmio Quem de Televisão	Best Newcomer	Insensato Coração	Nominated	
2012	Melhores do Ano	Best Newcomer Actress	Insensato Coração	Nominated	
2014	Prêmio Contigo! de TV	Best Supporting Actress	Amor à Vida	Nominated	
2014	Prêmio F5	Best Actress (telenovela)	Meu Pedacinho de Chão	Nominated	
2014	Melhores do Ano	Best Telenovela Actress	Meu Pedacinho de Chão	Nominated	
2015	Melhores do Ano	Best Newcomer Actress	A Regra do Jogo	Nominated	
2016	Troféu Viver SC	Best Artist	Herself	Won	
2022	Sundance Film Festival	Special Jury Award (for the Ensemble Cast)	A Wild Patience Has Taken Me Here	Won	
2022	Festival Mix Brasil	Best Performance	A Wild Patience Has Taken Me Here	Won	
