= Quem Matou Pixote? =

1996 film directed by José Joffily

- Directed by: José Joffily
- Written by: Jorge Durán; Paulo Halm; José Joffily; José Louzeiro (book)
- Starring: Cassiano Carneiro; Luciana Rigueira; Joana Fomm; Tuca Andrada; Roberto Bomtempo
- Cinematography: Nonato Estrela
- Music by: Mauricio Maestro; David Tygel
- Distributed by: Columbia Pictures
- Release date: 1996
- Running time: 116 minutes
- Country: Brazil
- Language: Portuguese

Quem Matou Pixote? (English: Who Killed Pixote?) is a 1996 Brazilian drama biographical film directed by José Joffily. Based on the true story of Fernando Ramos da Silva, actor of Hector Babenco's Pixote: A Lei do Mais Fraco (1981).

== Synopsis ==
The story of Fernando Ramos da Silva, a semi-illiterate who became known when playing the title role in Pixote.

== Cast ==
- Cassiano Carneiro ... Fernando Ramos da Silva (Pixote)
- Luciana Rigueira ... Cida Venâncio da Silva
- Joana Fomm ... Josefa
- Tuca Andrada ... Cafu
- Roberto Bomtempo ... Lobato
- Carol Machado ... Ana Lúcia
- Maria Luisa Mendonça ... Malu
- Anselmo Vasconcelos ... Director
- Antônio Petrin
- Antonio Abujamra ... Lawyer
- Paulo Betti ... TV director
- Maria Lúcia Dahl ... Actress

== Critical reception ==
Emanuel Levy of Variety said that the film is "a disappointing dramatic reconstruction of the turbulent life and untimely death of child actor Fernando Ramos da Silva," and that "despite honorable intentions and an interesting life to relate, Pixote is not touching."

== Awards ==
Wins

- 1996 Gramado Film Festival
  - Popular jury award
  - Best Film
  - Best Actor (Cassiano Carneiro)
  - Best Actress (Luciana Rigueira)
  - Best Screenplay
  - Best Cinematography
  - Best Score
- 1996 Havana Film Festival
  - Best Actor (Cassiano Carneiro)
- 1997 Cartagena Film Festival
  - Best Actress (Luciana Rigueira)
  - Best Supporting Actor (Tuca Andrada and Roberto Bomtempo)
