= Miriam Pires =

Brazilian actress (1927–2004)

- Born: Miriam de Souza Pires; 20 April 1927; Rio de Janeiro, Brazil
- Died: 7 September 2004 (aged 77); Rio de Janeiro, Brazil
- Occupation: Actress
- Years active: 1945–2004
- Children: 1

Miriam de Souza Pires (20 April 1927 – 7 September 2004) was a Brazilian actress. She acted in over 40 telenovelas, including prominent roles in Irmãos Coragem, Pecado Capital, Gabriela, Pedra sobre Pedra, Sonho Meu, and O Casarão. Having won the Festival de Brasília Best Supporting Actress Award in 1978 for A Summer Rain, Pires acted in twelve films during her career. She was born in Rio de Janeiro, where she died from toxoplasmosis.

== Selected filmography ==
=== Films ===
- A Summer Rain (1978)
- Gabriela, Cravo e Canela (1983)
- Kiss of the Spider Woman (1985)
- Subway to the Stars (1987)

=== Telenovelas ===
- A Sucessora (1978)
- Tieta (1989)
- Pedra sobre Pedra (1992)
- Sonho Meu (1993)
- Xica da Silva (1996)
- Uga-Uga (2000)
- Um Anjo Caiu do Céu (2001)
- Desejos de Mulher (2002)
- Senhora do Destino (2004)
