= Chica da Silva: A Brazilian Slave of the Eighteenth Century =

2009 book by Júnia Ferreira Furtado

Chica da Silva: A Brazilian Slave of the Eighteen Century is a book by historian Júnia Ferreira Furtado published by Cambridge University Press in 2009. It details the life of Chica da Silva, an eighteenth-century Brazilian woman who gained her freedom.

== Critical reception ==
Review by Mariana L. R. Dantas in the Journal of Social History 44 (Spring 2011): 950-952.

Review by Katherine Holt in the Journal of World History 22 (2011): 391-393.

Review by Beatriz Mamigonian in Slavery & Abolition 31(2010): 300-302.
