= 2011 Torneio Touchdown =

The 2011 Torneio Touchdown was the third season since the league's foundation.

== Teams in 2011 ==
| Team | City/Area | Stadium | Joined |
Conference Walter Camp
| Botafogo Mamutes | Rio de Janeiro, Rio de Janeiro | | 2011 |
| Curitiba Predadores | Curitiba, Paraná | | 2011 |
| Palmeiras Locomotives | São Paulo, São Paulo | | 2011 |
| Ponta Grossa Phantoms | Ponta Grossa, Paraná | | 2010 |
| Santos Tsunami | Santos, São Paulo | | 2011 |
| Timbó Rhinos | Timbó, Santa Catarina | | 2011 |
| Tubarões do Cerrado | Brasília, Federal District | | 2009 |
| Vila Velha Tritões | Vila Velha, Espírito Santo | | 2010 |
Conference George Halas
| ABC Corsários | Natal, Rio Grande do Norte | | 2011 |
| Corinthian Steamroller | São Paulo, São Paulo | | 2011 |
| Curitiba Hurricanes | Curitiba, Paraná | | 2011 |
| Corupá Buffalos | Corupá, Santa Catarina | | 2011 |
| Jaraguá Breakers | Jaraguá do Sul, Santa Catarina | | 2010 |
| Ribeirão Preto Challengers | Ribeirão Preto, São Paulo | | 2011 |
| Uberlândia Lobos | Uberlândia, Minas Gerais | | 2011 |
| Vasco da Gama Patriotas | Rio de Janeiro, Rio de Janeiro | | 2010 |
