= On Behalf of My Son =

2026 Brazilian drama film

- Promotional release poster
- Portuguese: Vicentina Pede Desculpas
- Directed by: Gabriel Martins
- Written by: Gabriel Martins
- Produced by: Thiago Macêdo Correia
- Starring: Rejane Faria; Maíra Azevedo; Renato Novaes; Giovanna Heliodoro; Thalma de Freitas; Grace Passô
- Cinematography: Leonardo Feliciano
- Edited by: Gabriel Martins; Thiago Ricarte
- Music by: Tiganá Santana
- Production company: Filmes de Plástico
- Distributed by: Netflix
- Release dates: 12 September 2026 (TIFF); 5 November 2026 (Brazil); 20 November 2026 (Netflix)
- Running time: 146 minutes
- Country: Brazil
- Language: Portuguese

On Behalf of My Son (Portuguese: Vicentina Pede Desculpas) is a 2026 Brazilian drama film written and directed by Gabriel Martins. It follows Vicentina (Rejane Faria), a 75-year-old retired teacher who seeks out the families of victims after the death of her son Wesley (Renato Novaes) in a bus accident in Belo Horizonte.

The film had its world premiere at the Platform section of the 2026 Toronto International Film Festival on 12 September, where it competed for the Platform Prize. It will be released in Brazilian theatres on 5 November and subsequently globally by Netflix on 20 November 2026.

== Synopsis ==
On a sunny morning in Belo Horizonte, a busy city bus heads toward downtown. While crossing an overpass, it suddenly swerves, leaves the road, and falls onto the avenue below. Where only one passenger survives. The disaster becomes major national news. Video footage raises doubts about whether the crash was an intentional suicide. Wesley's mother Vicentina, a 75-year-old retired teacher, is heartbroken and unsure how to cope. Deciding to visit the families of the victims, the painful and complicated journey is not what she expected.

== Cast ==
- Rejane Faria as Vicentina
- Maíra Azevedo as Joana
- Renato Novaes as Wesley/Bruno
- Giovanni Venturini as Fred
- Giovanna Heliodoro as Gisele
- Grace Passô as Isabel
- Marisa Revert as Vera
- Fernanda Vianna as Marta
- Clébia Sousa as Solange
- Fábio Leal as Victor
- Docy Moreira as Marluce
- Carlos Francisco as Antônio
- Thalma de Freitas as Cleide
- Flavio Bauraqui as Luiz
- Bárbara Colen as Amélia
- Karine Teles
- Miguelzinho do Cavaco as himself

== Production ==
Martins revealed on his Instagram account that the project was under development for the last 10 years. Vicentina was also the name of his paternal grandmother, who was a close relative to him. Produced by Martins' co-owned Filmes de Plástico in partnership with Netflix, it marks Martins' second feature film, following Mars One (2022), about Belo Horizonte's working class.

Principal photography began on 18 September 2024, shooting on location at Belo Horizonte, Minas Gerais.

== Release ==
On Behalf of My Son had its world premiere at the 2026 Toronto International Film Festival on 12 September 2026, in Platform section. The film was also selected for the main competition of the 74th San Sebastián International Film Festival, where it competed for Golden Shell on 24 September 2026.

It was selected in the Main Slate of Mill Valley Film Festival to be screened on 6 October 2026. It competed in Premiére Brasil section of the Rio de Janeiro International Film Festival on 9 October 2026, where it won 3 awards.

The film was shortlisted for Brazilian submission for the 99th Academy Awards for Best International Feature Film.

The Brazilian Film Academy submitted On Behalf of My Son for the Best Ibero-American Film category at the 41st Goya Awards.

The film will be available on Netflix to stream from 20 November 2026.

== Accolades ==
Award	Date of ceremony	Category	Recipient(s)	Result	Ref.
Toronto International Film Festival	12 September 2026	Platform Prize	On Behalf of My Son	Nominated	
San Sebastián International Film Festival	26 September 2026	Golden Shell for Best Film	On Behalf of My Son	Nominated	
San Sebastián International Film Festival	26 September 2026	SIGNIS Award	On Behalf of My Son	Special Mention	
Rio de Janeiro International Film Festival	11 October 2026	Premiére Brasil: Director – Fiction	Gabriel Martins	Won	
Rio de Janeiro International Film Festival	11 October 2026	Screenplay	Gabriel Martins	Won	
Rio de Janeiro International Film Festival	11 October 2026	Fiction Feature – Audience Award	On Behalf of My	Won	
