= Babenco: Tell Me When I Die =

2019 film directed by Bárbara Paz

- Directed by: Bárbara Paz
- Written by: Maria Camargo; Bárbara Paz
- Produced by: Myra Babenco; Bárbara Paz
- Starring: Hector Babenco; Regina Braga; Willem Dafoe; Paulo José; Xuxa Lopes; Selton Mello; Fernanda Montenegro
- Cinematography: Stefan Ciupek; Carolina Costa
- Production company: HB Filmes
- Release date: September 2, 2019 (Venice Film Festival)
- Country: Brazil
- Language: Portuguese

Babenco: Tell Me When I Die (Brazilian Portuguese: Babenco – Alguém Tem que Ouvir o Coração e Dizer: Parou, literally "Someone has to listen to the heart and say it stopped") is a 2019 Brazilian documentary film directed by Bárbara Paz. The film premiered at the 2019 Venice Film Festival, where it won Best Documentary on Cinema. It focuses on the last years filmmaker Hector Babenco's life, who died in 2016 of cancer. It was selected as the Brazilian entry for the Best International Feature Film at the 93rd Academy Awards, but it was not nominated.

== Interviews ==
- Hector Babenco
- Regina Braga
- Willem Dafoe
- Paulo José
- Xuxa Lopes
- Selton Mello
- Fernanda Montenegro
- Bárbara Paz
- Carmo Sodré
- Fernanda Torres
- Dráuzio Varella

== Reception ==
=== Critical response ===
On the review aggregator website Rotten Tomatoes, 80% of 5 critics' reviews are positive, with an average rating of 7.5/10.

=== Awards and nominations ===
- WINNER: Venice Film Festival Best Documentary on Cinema (Italia) 2019
- WINNER: Bisato D'oro Independent Critic Award of Venice Film Festival (Italia) 2019
- WINNER: MIFF 2020 Best Documentary (India) 2020
- WINNER: FICVIÑA 2020 Best Latin American Documentary Feature Film (Chile) 2020
- SPECIAL MENTION: IDF 2020 4th West Lake International Documentary Festival (China) 2020
- WINNER: GZDOC 2020 Guangzhou International Documentary Film Festival (China) 2020
- NOMINADA: Mejor película iberoamericana en la 63° edición de los Premios Ariel entregada por la Academia Méxicana de Artes y Ciencias Cinematográficas

== See also ==
- List of submissions to the 93rd Academy Awards for Best International Feature Film
- List of Brazilian submissions for the Academy Award for Best International Feature Film
