= The Last Plantation =

1976 film

- Directed by: Marcos Farias
- Written by: Marcos Farias; José Lins do Rego
- Produced by: Miguel Borges; Maria Aparecida Correa de Souza; Marcos Farias
- Starring: Joffre Soares
- Cinematography: Renato Neumann
- Release date: 1976
- Running time: 88 minutes
- Country: Brazil
- Language: Portuguese

The Last Plantation (Portuguese: Fogo morto) is a 1976 Brazilian drama film directed by Marcos Farias. It was entered into the 26th Berlin International Film Festival.

== Cast ==
- Joffre Soares
- Othon Bastos
- Rafael de Carvalho
- Rodolfo Arena
- Ângela Leal
- Fernando Peixoto
- Procópio Mariano
- Alberto Solha
- Mary Neubauer
- Vicentina Amaral
- Marcelo Malta
- José Cavalcanti
- Ari Severo
- Antonio Albuquerque
