= Júnia Ferreira Furtado =

Brazilian historian and university professor

Júnia Ferreira Furtado (Belo Horizonte, 1960) is a Brazilian historian and university professor. She retired from the Universidade Federal de Minas Gerais (UFMG) in 2016.

== Education ==
After graduating in 1983 with a degree in History from the Universidade Federal de Minas Gerais, Júnia Furtado completed a specialization in Modern and Contemporary History from the Pontifícia Universidade Católica de Minas Gerais. She then completed a Master's degree in Social History from the Universidade de São Paulo (1991), where she went on to defend her doctoral degree in 1996.

In 2000, Júnia Furtado completed a post-doctorate at Princeton University. In 2008 and 2009, she completed another post-doctorate at the École des hautes études en sciences sociales.

In 2003, Furtado published her best-known work Chica da Silva e o contratador de diamantes, (English: Chica da Silva: A Brazilian Slave of the Eighteenth Century).

She has been a professor at the UFMG since 1992, and at the Universidade de Lisboa since 2005.

== Books ==
- Memória sobre a capitania das Minas Gerais: seu território, clima e produções metálicas (edição crítica do livro de José Vieira Couto), 1994
- O Livro da Capa Verde: o regimento diamantino de 1771 e a vida no distrito Diamantino no período da Real Extração, 1996
- Chica da Silva: A Brazilian Slave of the Eighteenth Century (New York: Cambridge University Press, 2009).
- Índice do Inventário dos Manuscritos Avulsos relativos a Minas Gerais existentes no Arquivo Ultramarino (Lisboa), 1998
- Homens de negócio: a interiorização da metrópole e do comércio nas Minas setecentistas, 1999
- Cultura e Sociedade no Brasil Colônia, 2000
- Diálogos Oceânicos: Minas Gerais e as novas abordagens para uma história do Império Ultramarino português (organizadora), 2001
- Cartografia das Minas Gerais: da Capitania à Província, 2002
- Erário Mineral de Luís Gomes Ferreira (organizadora), 2002
- Chica da Silva e o contratador dos diamantes: o outro lado do mito, 2003
- Cartografia da Conquista do Território das Minas, 2004
- Trabalho livre, trabalho escravo Brasil e Europa, séculos XVIII e XIX (organizadora), 2006
- Odontologia: história restaurada, 2007
- Sons, formas, cores e movimentos na modernidade atlântica: Europa, Américas e África (organizadora), 2008
- O governo dos povos, 2009

== Awards ==
- Honorable mention for the 2004 Casa de las Américas Prize for her book about Chica da Silva.
- Honorable mention (2004) for the Prêmio Érico Vanucci Mendes, awarded by the CNPq
