= Joffre Soares =

Brazilian actor (1918–1996)

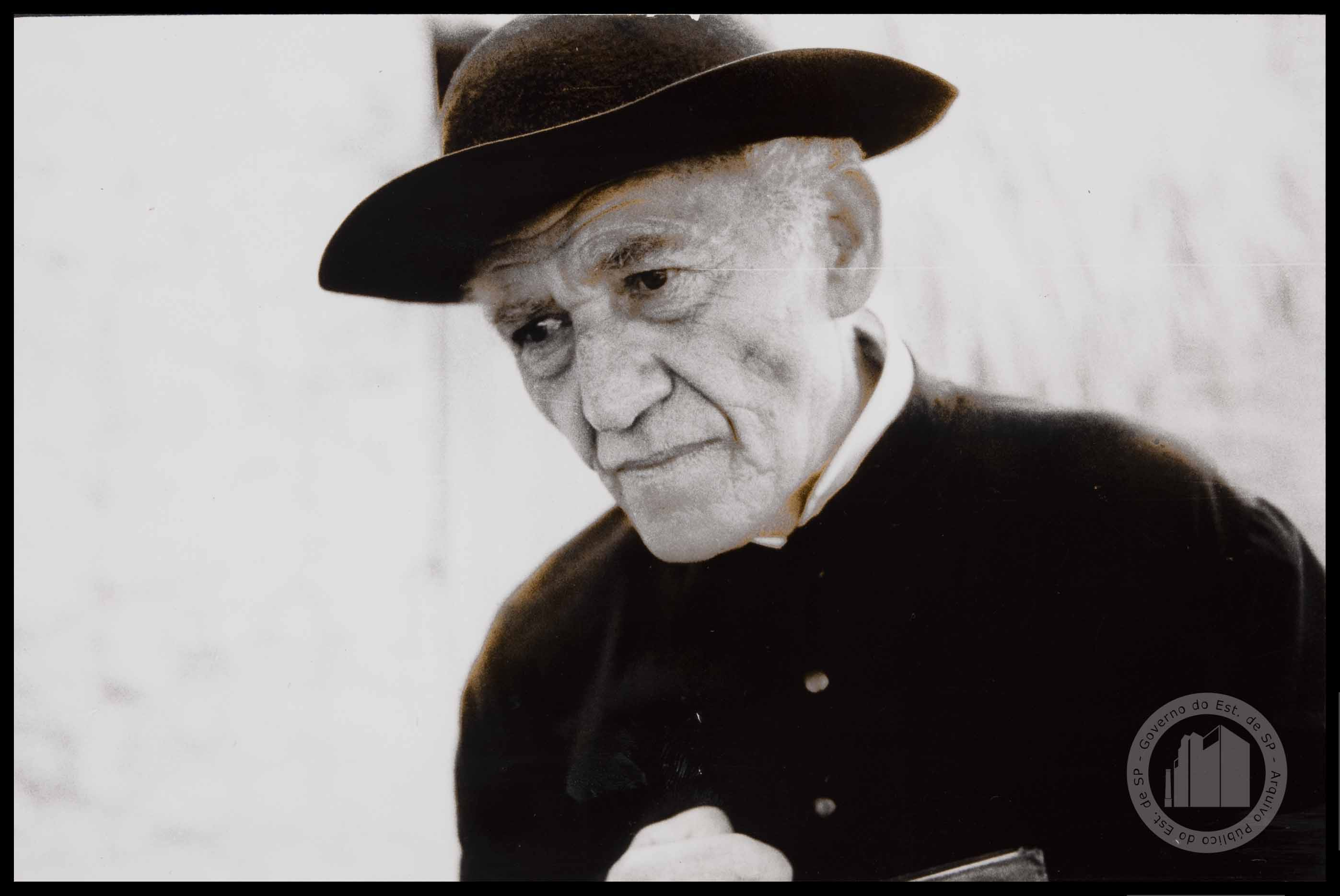
- Born: 21 September 1918; Palmeira dos Índios, Brazil
- Died: 19 August 1996 (aged 77); São Paulo, Brazil
- Occupation: Actor
- Years active: 1963–1996

Joffre Soares (21 September 1918 – 19 August 1996) was a Brazilian film actor. He appeared in 100 films between 1963 and 1996.

== Selected filmography ==
- Vidas secas (1963) - Fazendeiro (Farmer)
- River of Evil (1963)
- Selva Trágica (1964) - Nitan
- Grande Sertão (1965) - Zé Bebelo
- Entre Amor e O Cangaço (1965)
- The Hour and Turn of Augusto Matraga (1965) - Joaozinho Bem Bem
- A Grande Cidade ou As Aventuras e Desventuras de Luzia e Seus 3 Amigos Chegados de Longe (1966) - Lourival
- Entranced Earth (1967) - Father Gil
- The ABC of Love (1967) - Inez's father (segment "Pacto, O")
- Proezas de Satanás na Vila de Leva e Tráz (1967) - Blind Man
- Panca de Valente (1968)
- Viagem ao Fim do Mundo (1968) - Barbosa
- O Homem Nu (1968) - Senator Santos Neves
- Maria Bonita, Rainha do Cangaço (1968) - Salustiano
- A Virgem prometida (1968)
- A Madona de Cedro (1968) - Padre Estevão
- O Dragão da Maldade Contra o Santo Guerreiro (1969) - Horácio, the Coronel / Land Owner
- O Cangaceiro Sem Deus (1969)
- O Cangaceiro Sanguinário (1969) - Justino / Coronel-Colonel
- Corisco, O Diabo Loiro (1969) - Domingos
- A um Pulo da Morte (1969)
- Águias em Patrulha (1969)
- The Prophet of Hunger (1970) - Priest
- A Guerra dos Pelados (1970)
- Uma Verdadeira História de Amor (1971) - Father
- S. Bernardo (1972) - Padre Brito
- Joao (1972) - João
- Trindade... é Meu Nome (1973)
- The Amulet of Ogum (1974) - Severiano
- Sagarana: The Duel (1974)
- Exorcismo Negro (1974)
- Trote de Sádicos (1974) - Delegado
- O Exorcista de Mulheres (1974)
- Noiva da Noite - o Desejo de 7 Homens (1974) - Coronel
- Guerra Conjugal (1974) - Joãozinho
- As Cangaceiras Eróticas (1974)
- O Predileto (1975) - Totônio Pacheco
- O Jeca Macumbeiro (1975) - Januário
- Cada um Dá o que Tem (1975) - (segment "Despejo, O")
- The Last Plantation (1976)
- Os Pastores da Noite (1976) - Mad-Cock / Coq-fou
- Crueldade Mortal (1976) - Antônio
- Um Brasileiro Chamado Rosaflor (1976)
- Soledade, a Bagaceira (1976)
- Padre Cícero (1976) - Padre Cícero
- O Menino da Porteira (1976) - Major Batista
- Tenda dos Milagres (1977)
- Quem Matou Pacífico? (1977)
- O Jogo da Vida (1977)
- O Crime do Zé Bigorna (1977)
- Morte e Vida Severina (1977)
- Cordão De Ouro (1977)
- A Virgem da Colina (1977)
- Batalha dos Guararapes (1978) - Frei Salvador
- Colonel Delmiro Gouveia (1978)
- A Summer Rain (1978) - Afonso
- A Santa Donzela (1978)
- Milagre - O Poder da Fé (1979)
- O Guarani (1979)
- O Coronel e o Lobisomem (1979)
- O Caçador de Esmeraldas (1979) - Fernão Dias
- O Bom Burguês (1979) - O Velho
- Amor e Traição (1979) - Coronel Tonho
- Bye Bye Brasil (1980) - Zé da Luz
- O Inseto do Amor (1980) - Padre
- O Boi Misterioso e o Vaqueiro Menino (1980)
- Cabocla Teresa (1980)
- Bacanal (1980) - Belarmino
- Tempo de Revanche (1981) - El Padre
- La conquista del paraíso (1981) - Joao Mentira
- Amélia, Mulher de Verdade (1981)
- Aberrações de uma Prostituta (1981)
- Dôra Doralina (1982)
- Gabriela, Cravo e Canela (1983) - Cel. Ramiro Bastos
- Águia na Cabeça (1984)
- Quilombo (1984) - Canindé
- Memoirs of Prison (1984) - Soares
- Os Trapalhões e o Mágico de Oróz (1984) - Judge
- O Filho Adotivo (1984)
- Perdidos no Vale dos Dinossauros (1985) - Josè
- Tigipió - Uma Questão de Amor e Honra (1985)
- Jubiabá (1986)
- Por Incrível Que Pareça (1986)
- Sonhos de Menina Moça (1988)
- Sonhei com Você (1988)
- Better Days Ahead (1989) - Coronel
- O Grande Mentecapto (1989)
- Después de la tormenta (1990) - Jesús de las Mercedes
- O Gato de Botas Extraterrestre (1990)
- The Third Bank of the River (1994)
- Felicidade É... (1995) - (segment "Bolo")
- O Cangaceiro (1997) - Tico velho
- Perfumed Ball (1997) - Padre Cícero
