= Subway to the Stars =

1987 film

- Film poster
- Directed by: Carlos Diegues; Tereza Gonzalez
- Written by: Carlos Diegues; Carlos Lombardi
- Produced by: Carlos Henrique Braga; Rodolfo Brandão; George Reinhard
- Starring: Guilherme Fontes
- Cinematography: Edgar Moura
- Edited by: Gilberto Santeiro
- Release date: May 1987
- Running time: 103 minutes
- Country: Brazil
- Language: Portuguese

Subway to the Stars (Portuguese: Um Trem para as Estrelas) is a 1987 Brazilian drama film directed by Carlos Diegues. It was entered into the 1987 Cannes Film Festival. The film was selected as the Brazilian entry for the Best Foreign Language Film at the 60th Academy Awards, but was not accepted as a nominee.

== Cast ==
- Guilherme Fontes - Vinicius
- Milton Gonçalves - Freitas
- Taumaturgo Ferreira - Dream
- Ana Beatriz Wiltgen - Nicinha
- Zé Trindade - Oliveira
- Míriam Pires - Mrs.Oliveira
- José Wilker - Teacher
- Betty Faria - Camila
- Daniel Filho - Brito
- Tania Boscoli - Bel
- Fausto Fawcett - himself

== See also ==
- List of submissions to the 60th Academy Awards for Best Foreign Language Film
- List of Brazilian submissions for the Academy Award for Best Foreign Language Film
