= Bye Bye Brazil =

1979 film directed by Carlos Diegues

- American release poster
- Directed by: Carlos Diegues
- Written by: Carlos Diegues; Leopoldo Serran
- Produced by: Luiz Carlos Barreto; Lucy Barreto
- Starring: José Wilker; Betty Faria; Fábio Jr. Zaira Zambelli
- Cinematography: Lauro Escorel
- Edited by: Mair Tavares
- Music by: Chico Buarque; Dominguinhos; Roberto Menescal
- Production company: L. C. Barreto
- Distributed by: Embrafilme
- Release date: 1979
- Running time: 100 minutes
- Countries: Brazil; France; Argentina
- Language: Portuguese

Bye Bye Brazil (Portuguese: Bye Bye Brasil) is a 1979 satirical comedy film co-written and directed by Carlos Diegues. Starring José Wilker, Betty Faria and Fábio Jr., the film follows a circus troupe travelling through Brazil, seeking surviving late 1970's societal changes during the rising popularity of television. It was filmed on location in Belém, Altamira, Maceió and Brasília.

The film had its international premiere in the main competition of the 1980 Cannes Film Festival.

== Plot ==
The "Caravana Rolidei" (Holiday Caravan) is a traveling show made up of a magician, Lorde Cigano (Gypsy Lord), exotic dancer Salomé, and the mute strongman Andorinha (Swallow). The caravan drives their van up and performs in small towns along the São Francisco River. Afterwards a local accordion player, Ciço, begs Lorde Cigano to let him join them. He agrees, and Ciço joins the caravan together with his pregnant wife Dasdô. They then go to Maceió to see the ocean, but completely fail to find any business.

They arrive at the next town only to find everyone watching the new invention, television, in a public area, since at first, in poor areas, television was too expensive for people to have it in their homes. After attempting and failing to convince the audience to stop watching, Lorde Cigano pretends to use magic to blow up the TV (actually just Salomé overloading a circuit breaker). The townspeople then force them to leave.

At a gas station, Swallow arm-wrestles a truck driver for money as part of a bet. After losing multiple times, he tells Lorde Cigano that he has come from Altamira, which he describes as a new El Dorado, a place of riches where no one can spend their money.

Driving into a small town, they learn from another traveling performer who screens films, during a screening of O Ébrio, that the town has not received rain in over two years. The traveling performer tells the group that the community has no money, and that they pay to watch his films with food, drink, and other odd possessions. As the sun sets, Ciço enters Salomé's tent with lust in his eyes. Salomé proceeds to put on her record player and the two have sex. Dasdô is aware of the whole encounter, and while she is clearly not pleased with Ciço, she doesn't seem very upset either. Lorde Cigano then decides to take the group to Altamira.

On the drive, Dasdô gives birth, as the group navigates through dense jungle along a long, straight dirt road, littered with dead trees and an armadillo. The caravan finds a group of indigenous people who ask for a ride to Altamira. They cannot make a living in the jungle anymore because of the white men bringing change and death. Lorde Cigano agrees to take them for a price.

Upon arriving at Altamira, they find that the city is actually highly developed and is not rural like they previously believed. Attempting to earn money, Lorde Cigano has Swallow wrestle another strongman, betting the caravan's truck. Losing the bet and their means of transport, Lorde Cigano asks Salomé to temporarily prostitute herself, so they can afford to leave Altamira.

That night, Swallow leaves the group, and Lorde Cigano has sex with Dasdô. The next morning, Salomé comes back with money. Lorde Cigano splits the money, and tells Ciço to leave with Dasdô. He refuses to leave, after which Lorde Cigano explicitly tells him they are going to a whorehouse. Ciço volunteers Dasdô to work in the whorehouse without so much as asking her, and Lorde Cigano tells him he will have to tell his wife.

Upon arriving in the next town and ending up at a bar, a man tries to go out with Dasdô. Ciço stops him, and pushes him away. Salomé ends up going and having sex with the man, and Ciço states that he will take the bus to Brasília with Dasdô. The next morning however, he is outside Lorde Cigano and Salomé's hotel room. He states that he won't go to Brasília, and confesses his eternal love for Salomé.

Lorde Cigano, however, finally loses his patience with Ciço, and punches him multiple times, knocking him out, and wheels him out and onto the bus. Ciço and Dasdô end up taking the bus down to a small home in Brasília.

Some time later, Ciço and Dasdô are performing onstage in a small club with a band, with their child playing in the band. Ciço hears the sound of a loudspeaker, and goes outside to see a much more modern truck with neon lights, the new "Caravana Rolidey", driven by Salomé with Lorde Cigano in the passenger seat. He asks Ciço and Dasdô to rejoin them, and tells him that they are going inland to bring civilization, telling them that the innermost area has never seen anything like them. Ciço declines, however, and Lorde Cigano returns to the van, as he and Salomé drive off along the highway.

== Geography of the movie ==
The movie has a thematic richness in the way it presents its locations. The region depicted is northeastern Brazil, characterized by historical lack of rain, which is to Brazil something like a combination of the dry midwest and the folkloric South of the United States. It is a region many leave to find work towards the south (Rio de Janeiro, São Paulo). They are in the sertão, a word for which there is no exact translation in any language, but approximately "the backlands", far from a city. Country music in Brazil is sertão music, "música sertaneja”. The partly navigable São Francisco River, at the movie's opening, is Brazil's largest river outside the Amazon watershed, and the longest river totally in Brazil. It (not the Amazon) is culturally in Brazil something like the Mississippi is in the U.S. Another major river, the Xingu, also appears.

There are a number of shots of rivers, boats, and a ferry - the boats and ferry old but utilitarian. This is the old river transportation.

Modern transportation is via highways. A major theme is the expansion of modern civilization, from the northeast into the west, into the adjacent Amazon jungle. We see a bulldozer, and television antennae are discussed — into the jungle, building highways, destroying native cultures; the Caravan, while decrying this, is in fact participating in the process. At one place, the male lead says that the Caravan is civilization, which it is bringing to those that don't have it. The mute truck driver is said to represent the working class: mute, in the Brazil of the 1960s. A social service organization, Casa do Ceará ("The Ceará House", Ceará being a northeastern state), with extravagant promises, is ridiculed. A mayor is hypocritical; women are exploited. Yet the mood is optimistic: it's great to have a truck, the title song says, and to set off on the road. "The sun will never set" are the concluding words of the title song, which concludes the movie.

== Native Brazilians ==
Brazilian whites and mulattoes (more numerous than the whites) coexist with the pre-contact native Brazilians somewhat like white Americans do with native Americans. Once the Caravan takes the Pan-American Highway, recently constructed and still unpaved, they meet native Brazilians in Bolivia. Some ask for a ride to the next major city, Altamira. The most important of the natives is their ruler, who says "my kingdom ["audiencia"] is over." His elderly father attempts to make conversation about the President of Brazil, as if they were equals, both heads of countries.

The natives are anything but unhappy with their state of affairs. They want to be civilized. They hear news on a battery-powered radio (commercial short wave radio, as short waves travel further than the familiar medium wave AM broadcast band). We see their excitement at their first encounter with frozen food: a bar of ice cream on a stick, like a popsicle. The mother is dying to fly on a plane, a labor recruiter sends those recruited off by jet, and a small commercial jet makes a cameo appearance taking off from the airport of the small Altamira (like in Alaska, settlements are far from each other, roads poor or non-existent, so communication is limited to boats or planes).

== Cast ==
- José Wilker as Lorde Cigano (Lord Gypsy)
- Betty Faria as Salomé
- Fábio Jr. as Ciço
- Zaira Zambelli as Dasdô
- Príncipe Nabor as Andorinha / Swallow
- Emmanuel Cavalcanti as Mayor (as Emanoel Cavalcanti)
- José Márcio Passos as Mayor's Assistant
- Carlos Kroeber as Truck Driver
- Joffre Soares as Zé da Luz
- Rodolfo Arena as Peasant
- Aderbal Junior
- Carlos Lagoeíro as Sertanejo
- Catalina Bonakie as Widow (as Catalina Bonaky)
- Rinaldo Gines as Indian Chief
- Marcus Vinícius as Empresário

== Music ==
Chico Buarque made a minor hit record from the title song, "Bye Bye Brasil", whose lyrics do not precisely match the action in the film, as if the song had been ordered before the script was written. It matches some basic facts: the voice is that of a man, without a girlfriend nearby; he goes to Belem and Maceió. But the song also has him in places the movie does not visit: Ilheus, Tocantins, and he contracts an "illness" (doença, probably gonorrhea), in Ilheus, "but now everything's OK", and again in Belem, "but I'm almost cured". Now the progress is pin-ball machines ("fliperama") and skates. But, inexplicably, he took the coastal passenger boat ("a Costeira", the Coastal [boat]), important in the pre-airplane era, but the Companhia Nacional de Navegação Costeira (:pt:) ceased operations in 1965. He has a Japanese man behind him waiting to use the phone, whom he mentions twice; it is Brazilian folk wisdom that the Japanese are going to have too much power in Brazil if we aren’t careful.

The accordion is to the sertão something like what the guitar is in the U.S., the instrument of country music. The accordion and an accordion player play major roles. The music is actually played by, and credited to, Brazil's most famous accordion player, Dominguinhos (who does not appear).

== Reception ==
=== Critical response ===
Bye Bye Brasil was listed as one of the top 10 Brazilian films by Glauco Ortolano of World Literature Today. The New York Times noted that it was "a most reflective film, nicely acted by its small cast and beautifully though not artily photographed in some remarkable locations." The film has been described as a kind of "Seismological documentary … registers the cultural aftershocks of the Brazilian Subcontinent."

=== Awards and nominations ===
The film was nominated for the Palme d'Or at the 1980 Cannes Film Festival. The film was also selected as the Brazilian entry for the Best Foreign Language Film at the 53rd Academy Awards, but was not accepted as a nominee.

== See also ==
- List of submissions to the 53rd Academy Awards for Best Foreign Language Film
- List of Brazilian submissions for the Academy Award for Best Foreign Language Film
