= My Hindu Friend =

2016 film directed by Héctor Babenco

- Brazilian film poster
- Directed by: Hector Babenco
- Written by: Hector Babenco
- Produced by: Hector Babenco
- Starring: Willem Dafoe; Maria Fernanda Cândido; Bárbara Paz; Selton Mello; Reynaldo Gianecchini
- Cinematography: Mauro Pinheiro Jr.
- Edited by: Gustavo Giani
- Music by: Zbigniew Preisner
- Production company: HB Filmes
- Release dates: 22 October 2015 (São Paulo International Film Festival); 3 March 2016
- Country: Brazil
- Languages: Portuguese; English

My Hindu Friend is a 2015 Brazilian drama film, directed and written by Hector Babenco, starring Willem Dafoe, Maria Fernanda Cândido, Bárbara Paz, Selton Mello and Reynaldo Gianecchini.

It was released on 3 March 2016.

== Plot ==
Diego (Willem Dafoe) is a film director who is diagnosed with cancer and, while hospitalized, meets and befriends a Hindu 8-year-old boy who is also a patient at the hospital.

== Cast ==
- Willem Dafoe as Diego Fairman
- Maria Fernanda Cândido as Livia Monteiro Bueno
- Reynaldo Gianecchini as Ricardo Steen
- Selton Mello as Common Man
- Bárbara Paz as Sofia Guerra
- Guilherme Weber as Antonio Fairman
- Dan Stulbach as Marcos
- Gilda Nomacce as Antonio's Wife
- Tuna Dwek as Gabi
- Tania Khalill as Rosemary
- Maitê Proença as Debora
- Dalton Vigh as Dr. Morris
- Supla as Paiva
- Ary Fontoura as Dudu
- Rio Adlakha as Hindu Friend
- Soren Hellerup as Herbert Spencer

== Reception ==
On the review aggregator website Rotten Tomatoes, 83% of 6 critics' reviews are positive, with an average rating of 7.0/10.
