= The Story of Fausta =

1988 film

- Directed by: Bruno Barreto
- Written by: Naum Alves de Sousa
- Starring: Betty Faria
- Release date: 1988
- Running time: 90 minutes
- Country: Brazil
- Language: Portuguese

The Story of Fausta (Portuguese: Romance da Empregada) is a 1988 Brazilian drama film directed by Bruno Barreto. The film was selected as the Brazilian entry for the Best Foreign Language Film at the 61st Academy Awards, but was not accepted as a nominee.

== Cast ==
- Betty Faria as Fausta
- Brandão Filho as Zé da Placa
- Expedito Barreira
- Nika Bonfim
- Mário Borges
- Neusa Borges
- Cândido Damm
- Arthur Costa Filho
- Daniel Filho as João
- Stela Freitas as amiga de Fausta
- Cláudia Jimenez

== See also ==
- List of submissions to the 61st Academy Awards for Best Foreign Language Film
- List of Brazilian submissions for the Academy Award for Best Foreign Language Film
