= The Great Mystical Circus (film) =

2016 film directed by Carlos Diegues

- Film poster
- Portuguese: O Grande Circo Místico
- Directed by: Cacá Diegues
- Written by: Cacá Diegues; George Moura
- Based on: "The Great Mystical Circus" by Jorge de Lima
- Produced by: Luís Galvão Teles; Renata Almeida Magalhães
- Starring: Vincent Cassel; Bruna Linzmeyer; Jesuíta Barbosa; Mariana Ximenes; Catherine Mouchet
- Cinematography: Gustavo Hadba
- Edited by: Daniel Garcia; Mair Tavares
- Music by: Chico Buarque; Edu Lobo
- Release dates: 12 May 2018 (Cannes); 15 November 2018 (Brazil)
- Running time: 105 minutes
- Countries: Brazil; Portugal; France
- Language: Portuguese
- Box office: $51,736

The Great Mystical Circus (Portuguese: O Grande Circo Místico) is a 2018 Brazilian romantic drama film directed and written by Cacá Diegues, his first film in 12 years. It premiered at the 2018 Cannes Film Festival and was selected as the Brazilian entry for the Best Foreign Language Film at the 91st Academy Awards, but it was not nominated.

It is based on a poem by Jorge de Lima and tells the story of a great love affair between an aristocrat and an acrobat and the saga of the Austrian family who owned the Circus Knieps, and their adventures around the world during the early 20th century.

== Plot ==
The story of five generations of the same circus family, from the grand opening of the Great Mystical Circus in 1910 to the present day. Celavi, the master of ceremonies that never ages, shows the adventures and loves of the Knieps, from heyday to decadence.

== Cast ==
- Vincent Cassel as Jean-Paul
- Bruna Linzmeyer as Beatriz
- Jesuíta Barbosa as Celavi
- Mariana Ximenes as Margareth
- Juliano Cazarré as Oto
- Catherine Mouchet as Imperatriz
- Antônio Fagundes as Dr. Frederico

== See also ==
- List of submissions to the 91st Academy Awards for Best Foreign Language Film
- List of Brazilian submissions for the Academy Award for Best Foreign Language Film
