= O Predileto =

1975 film directed by Roberto Palmari

- Directed by: Roberto Palmari
- Written by: João Alphonsus (novel); Roberto Palmari
- Starring: Joffre Soares; Suzana Gonçalves; Othon Bastos
- Cinematography: Roberto Palmari
- Release date: 19 December 1975 (Brazil)
- Running time: 99 minutes
- Country: Brazil
- Language: Portuguese

O Predileto is a 1975 Brazilian film directed by Roberto Palmari, based on the novel Totônio Pacheco written by João Alphonsus.

== Cast ==
- Joffre Soares .... Totônio Pacheco
- Susana Gonçalves .... Coló
- Othon Bastos ...Dr. Fernando
- Célia Helena
- Fernando Peixoto
- Wanda Kosmo
- João Carlos Ferreira
- Xandó Batista
- Ruthinéa de Moraes
- Abrahão Farc
- Maria Célia Camargo

== Awards and nominations ==
Gramado Film Festival (1976)

- Winner in the categories

Best Picture
Best Actor (Joffre Soares)
Best Cinematography (Roberto Palmari)
Best Screenplay (Roberto Palmari and Roberto Santos)

APCA Award

- Winner in the categories

Best Picture
Best Supporting Actor (Xandó Batista)
Best Scenic Design (Hermínio Queiroz Telles)
