= A Summer Rain =

1978 film directed by Carlos Diegues

- Theatrical release poster
- Directed by: Carlos Diegues
- Written by: Carlos Diegues
- Produced by: Luiz Fernando Goulart
- Starring: Joffre Soares; Miriam Pires
- Cinematography: José Medeiros
- Edited by: Mair Tavares
- Music by: Paulinho da Viola
- Production companies: Alter Filmes; Terra Filmes
- Distributed by: Embrafilme
- Release date: April 24, 1978
- Running time: 86 minutes
- Country: Brazil
- Language: Portuguese

A Summer Rain (Portuguese: Chuvas de Verão) is a 1978 Brazilian comedy-drama film directed by Carlos Diegues. It tells the story of Afonso, a newly retired sixty-five-year-old man who falls in love with his neighbor.

== Cast ==
- Joffre Soares as Afonso
- Miriam Pires as Isaura
- Rodolfo Arena as Lourenço
- Carlos Gregório as Paulinho
- Gracinda Freire as Judith
- Cristina Aché as Lurdinha
- Luis Antonio as Lacraia
- Daniel Filho as Geraldinho
- Marieta Severo as Dodora
- Lourdes Mayer as Dona Helô
- Paulo César Pereio as Juraci
- Sady Cabral as Abelardo
- Roberto Bonfim as chief officer

== Reception ==
It was awarded the Best Film at the 4th Festival de Cine Iberoamericano de Huelva, and it has won four awards at the 11th Festival de Brasília: Best Editing, Best Scenography, Best Supporting Actress for Pires and Best Supporting Actor for Pereio.
