= Fernando Ramos da Silva =

Brazilian actor (1967–1987)

- Born: Fernando Ramos da Silva; 29 November 1967; São Paulo, São Paulo, Brazil
- Died: 25 August 1987 (aged 19); São Paulo, São Paulo, Brazil
- Occupation: Actor
- Years active: 1975–1983

Fernando Ramos da Silva (29 November 1967 – 25 August 1987) was a Brazilian actor who became known for his role in Hector Babenco's 1980 film Pixote: A Lei do Mais Fraco, a documentary-style account of the street children of Brazil. Da Silva became a controversial figure after the film's release and found it hard to separate himself from his depiction as the street assailant Pixote.

On 25 August 1987, da Silva was fatally wounded in an alleged shootout with police. Police reports claim that da Silva was resisting arrest, but there are conflicting reports from eyewitnesses who claim da Silva was unarmed.

== Early life ==
Born on 29 November 1967 in São Paulo, da Silva was the sixth of ten children. When he was eight years old, his father died, leaving him with his widowed mother and the rest of his siblings. They lived in a poor city called Diadema on the outskirts of São Paulo.

As the opening of Pixote states, his upbringing was similar to that of the role he would end up portraying. His mother received a pension of less than $10 a month. The family sold lottery tickets to generate a livable income.

After attending grade school briefly, he soon joined a theater group and began acting in plays at the age of eight. His big break came when da Silva was picked out of 1,300 applicants by Hector Babenco to play the role of Pixote.

== Pixote: A Lei do Mais Fraco ==
Pixote was released in 1981 and would become Babenco's first internationally successful film.

The film follows four young boys through their stay in a reformatory and their subsequent breakout. After escaping, they return to their lives as children of the street, pickpockets, prostitutes, drug dealers, and, eventually, murderers.

Controversial aspects of the film include the brutal depiction of sex involving children, scenes of children committing acts of murder and drug trafficking. One of the major characters, Lilica, is a 17-year-old sex worker that sees older men.

Pixote became a huge international success, even earning a nomination for best Foreign-language film at the Golden Globes, although it achieved only moderate success in Brazil. An estimated 2.5 million viewers in 20 countries saw the movie. The movie received praise from film critics such as Roger Ebert of the Chicago Sun-Times and Vincent Canby of The New York Times.

== Life after Pixote ==
Da Silva's newfound success landed him a one-year contract on TV Globo in the prime-time soap opera O amor é nosso. However, he was soon fired, apparently for missing filming sessions, although his inability to read lines due to his illiteracy may have contributed to the perception that he was lazy.

After being fired from the soap opera, da Silva appeared in a small role in Gabriela, a movie by Bruno Barreto. He subsequently went to acting school where he dropped out after just two days.

Da Silva struggled to recapture his fame and eventually returned to the street life he had come from. In 1984, he was arrested on robbery charges in Diadema, one of several charges that would become a frequent occurrence for the former child star.

Da Silva married Maria Aparecida Venancia da Silva in 1985, with whom he had one daughter, Jacqueline.

== Death and surrounding controversy ==
On 25 August 1987, da Silva was shot by three policemen who claimed he had got into a shootout with them after being involved in a mugging. His sister challenged the official report, claiming that he was unarmed and had fled a police raid. While the police report stated that da Silva had been shot while resisting arrest, a forensic examination showed that he had been shot while lying on the ground. Both his wife and mother called the shooting "a police execution."

The story of Fernando Ramos da Silva is depicted in the 1996 biographical film Quem Matou Pixote?.
