= Pixote =

1980 film by Héctor Babenco

- Theatrical release poster
- Directed by: Héctor Babenco
- Written by: Héctor Babenco; Jorge Durán
- Based on: A Infância dos Mortos by José Louzeiro
- Produced by: Héctor Babenco; Paulo Francini; Jose Pinto
- Starring: Fernando Ramos da Silva; Jorge Julião; Gilberto Moura; Edilson Lino
- Cinematography: Rodolfo Sánchez
- Edited by: Luiz Elias
- Music by: John Neschling
- Production companies: H.B. Filmes; Unifilm
- Distributed by: Embrafilme
- Release date: 26 September 1980
- Running time: 128 minutes
- Country: Brazil
- Language: Portuguese

Pixote: A Lei do Mais Fraco (Portuguese pronunciation: [piˈʃɔtʃi a ˈlej du ˈmajs ˈfɾaku]; "Small Child: The Law of the Weakest") is a 1980 Brazilian crime drama film directed by Héctor Babenco. The screenplay was written by Babenco and Jorge Durán, based on the book A Infância dos Mortos (The Childhood of the Dead Ones) by José Louzeiro. The film is a docudrama account of Brazil's lower classes youth exposure to organized crime and police corruption.

The film features Fernando Ramos da Silva (who was killed at the age of 19 by Brazilian police in São Paulo) as Pixote and Marília Pêra as Sueli. The plot revolves around Pixote, a young boy who is used as a child criminal in muggings and drug transport. The film was selected as the Brazilian entry for the Best Foreign Language Film at the 54th Academy Awards, but it was disqualified.

In 2015, the Brazilian Film Critics Association (Abraccine) voted Pixote the 12th greatest Brazilian film of all time, in its list of the 100 best Brazilian films.

== Plot ==
After a police round up of street children, Pixote a 10-year-old boy is sent to a juvenile reformatory (FEBEM). The prison is a hellish school where Pixote uses glue sniffing as a means of emotional escape from the constant threats of abuse and rape.

It soon becomes clear that the young criminals are only pawns in the criminal, sadistic games of the prison guards and their commander.

When a boy dies of physical abuse by the police, the officials frame (and ultimately kill) another child, the unnamed lover of the trans woman known as Lilica, for the murder.

Soon after, Pixote, his friend Chico, Lilica and her new lover Dito find an opportunity to flee from the prison. First, they stay at the apartment of Cristal, a former lover of Lilica, but when tensions arise after Dito rejects Cristal's sexual advances, they go to Rio for a cocaine drug deal; there, however, they get duped by showgirl Débora.

After some time bumming around the city, Pixote and his friends go to a club for another drug deal. While there, Pixote finds Débora and, after an argument, stabs her. Chico is accidentally killed in the struggle.

The group become pimps for the prostitute Sueli who is definitely past her prime and is ill — possibly from a botched abortion. They conspire to rob her clients, but when Lilica's lover Dito falls for Sueli, Lilica leaves. The robbery scheme fails when an American client fights back (because he apparently does not understand Portuguese) and they shoot him. In the ensuing fight, Pixote accidentally shoots and kills Dito as well.

Pixote tries to gain comfort from Sueli, treating her as a mother figure by sucking on her breast, but she rejects him out of disgust. He leaves and walks down a railway line, gun in hand, disappearing in the distance.

== Cast ==
- Fernando Ramos da Silva as Pixote
- Jorge Julião as Lilica
- Gilberto Moura as Dito
- Edilson Lino as Chico
- Zenildo Oliveira Santos as Fumaça
- Claudio Bernardo as Garatao
- Israel Feres David as Roberto Pie de Plata
- Jose Nilson Martin dos Santos as Diego
- Marília Pêra as Sueli
- Jardel Filho as Sapatos Brancos
- Rubens de Falco as Juiz
- Elke Maravilha as Debora
- Tony Tornado as Cristal
- Beatriz Segall as Widower
- João José Pompeo as Almir

== Background ==
=== Casting ===
The movie is shot in the manner of a documentary and shows the strong influence by Italian neorealism in that amateur actors were used whose real lives strongly resembled those of the protagonists in the film.

=== Filming locations ===
It was filmed in São Paulo and Rio de Janeiro. The film features several scenes of Rio's beaches. Historical places in São Paulo like 'Viaduto Santa Ifigênia' and the statue 'Monumento às Bandeiras' (at the Ibirapuera Park) are seen throughout the film.

== Release ==
The film was first presented at the New Directors/New Films Festival in New York City on 5 May 1981. It later opened on a limited basis in the United States on 11 September 1981.

The film was screened at various film festivals, including the San Sebastián International Film Festival, Spain; the Toronto Festival of Festivals, Canada; the Locarno International Film Festival, Switzerland; and others.

== Reception ==
=== Critical response ===
On the review aggregator website Rotten Tomatoes, the film holds an approval rating of 94% based on 18 reviews.

Film critic Roger Ebert, who wrote for the Chicago Sun-Times, considered the film a classic, and wrote, "Pixote stands alone in Babenco's work, a rough, unblinking look at lives no human being should be required to lead. And the eyes of Fernando Ramos da Silva, his doomed young actor, regard us from the screen not in hurt, not in accusation, not in regret - but simply in acceptance of a desolate daily reality."

Critic Pauline Kael was impressed by its raw, documentary-like quality, and a certain poetic realism. She wrote, "Babenco's imagery is realistic, but his point of view is shockingly lyrical. South American writers, such as Gabriel García Márquez, seem to be in perfect, poetic control of madness, and Babenco has some of this gift, too. South American artists have to have it, in order to express the texture of everyday insanity."

The New York Times film critic, Vincent Canby, liked the neo-realist acting and direction of the drama, and wrote, "[Pixote], the third feature film by the Argentine-born Brazilian director Hector Babenco, is a finely made, uncompromisingly grim movie about the street boys of São Paulo, in particular about Pixote - which, according to the program, translates roughly as Peewee...The performances are almost too good to be true, but Mr. Da Silva and Miss Pera are splendid. Pixote is not for the weak of stomach. A lot of the details are tough to take, but it is neither exploitative nor pretentious. Mr. Babenco shows us rock-bottom, and because he is an artist, he makes us believe it as well all of the possibilities that have been lost."

Filmmakers Spike Lee, Mira Nair, Harmony Korine, Martin Scorsese, and the Safdie brothers have cited it as being among their favorite films or as an influence on their work.

=== Restoration and physical media release ===
The film was restored and released on Blu-ray by Criterion in the United States as part of Martin Scorsese’s World Cinema Project No. 3 in 2020.

In August 2021, Versátil Home Vídeo launched a pre-order campaign in Brazil, in partnership with Europa Filmes and HB Filmes, for an edition featuring the new restoration. Released as part of the Babenco Essentials – Limited Edition box set, it was limited to 1,000 copies and packaged with two other films by the director, both also restored in high definition: Kiss of the Spider Woman and King of the Night. The same year, the film was also included in the Hector Babenco Collection – Limited Edition DVD box set, alongside seven other films by Babenco.

=== Awards and nominations ===
Although it was accepted as the Brazilian submission for the Academy Award for Best Foreign Language Film it was later disqualified since it was test marketed in Brazil before the allowable date.

Wins

- San Sebastián International Film Festival: OCIC Award - Honorable Mention; Hector Babenco; 1981.
- Locarno International Film Festival: Silver Leopard; Hector Babenco; 1981.
- Los Angeles Film Critics Association Awards: LAFCA Award; Best Foreign Film; 1981.
- New York Film Critics Circle Awards: NYFCC Award; Best Foreign Language Film; 1981.
- Boston Society of Film Critics Awards: BSFC Award; Best Actress, Marília Pêra; Best Film; 1982.
- National Society of Film Critics Awards, USA: NSFC Award Best Actress, Marília Pêra; 1982.

Nominations

- National Board of Review of Motion Pictures (US), Best Foreign Language Film; 1981.
- Golden Globes: Golden Globe, Best Foreign Film, Brazil; 1982.

== See also ==
- Quem Matou Pixote? (Who Killed Pixote?)
- List of submissions to the 54th Academy Awards for Best Foreign Language Film
- List of Brazilian submissions for the Academy Award for Best Foreign Language Film
