= Betty Faria =

Brazilian actress

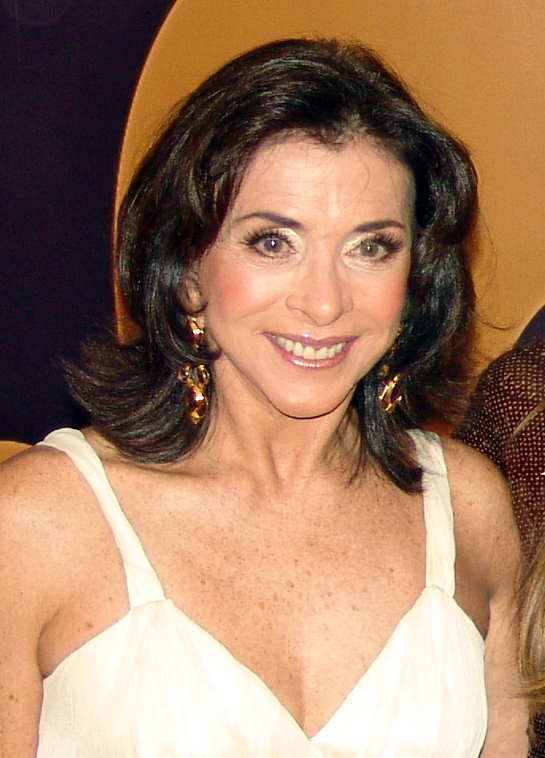
- Born: May 8, 1941 (age 85); Rio de Janeiro, Brazil
- Occupation: Actress

Elisabeth Maria Silva de Faria known professionally as Betty Faria (born May 8, 1941 in Rio de Janeiro) is a Brazilian actress.

She is best known for her interpretation of the title character in the 1989 telenovela Tieta.

She co-won (with Zezé Motta for Night Angels) the award for best actress at the 1987 Gramado Film Festival for "Anjos do Arrabalde" (or "Angels of the Outskirts").

== Personal life ==
She was brought up as a Christian and later converted to Nichiren Buddhism in 1996.

== Selected filmography ==
- Bye Bye Brasil (1979)
- Subway to the Stars (1987)
- The Story of Fausta (1988)
- Tieta (1989)
- Perfume de Gardênia (1992)
- A Indomada (1997)
- Suave Veneno (1999)
- América (2005)
- Alma Gêmea (2005)
- Duas Caras (2007)
- Uma Rosa com Amor (2010)
- Avenida Brasil (2012)
- Casa da Mãe Joana 2 (2013)
- A Dona do Pedaço (2019)
- Salve-se Quem Puder (2020)
- Volta por Cima (2024)
