= João and the Knife =

1972 film

João and the knife
- Film poster
- Directed by: George Sluizer
- Written by: George Sluizer; Odylo Costa Filho
- Produced by: Roberto Bakker
- Starring: Joffre Soares
- Cinematography: Jan de Bont
- Edited by: Jan Dop
- Release date: 5 October 1972
- Running time: 96 minutes
- Countries: Brazil; Netherlands
- Language: Portuguese

João and the knife (Portuguese: A Faca e o Rio, literally: The Knife and the River; Dutch: João en het mes) is a 1972 Brazilian drama film directed by Dutch filmmaker George Sluizer. It was entered into the 22nd Berlin International Film Festival. The film was also selected as the Brazilian entry for the Best Foreign Language Film at the 46th Academy Awards, but was not accepted as a nominee.

== Cast ==
- Joffre Soares as João
- Ana Maria Miranda as Maria
- Joao-Augusto Azevedo as Judge
- Douglas Santos as Zeferino
- João Batista as Deodato
- Áurea Campos as Dona Ana (as Aurea Souza Campos)

== See also ==
- List of submissions to the 46th Academy Awards for Best Foreign Language Film
- List of Brazilian submissions for the Academy Award for Best Foreign Language Film
