= Gabriel Martins =

Brazilian filmmaker (born 1987)

- Martins in 2026
- Born: 22 December 1987 (age 38); Belo Horizonte, Minas Gerais, Brazil
- Occupations: Filmmaker, editor, producer, actor, musician
- Years active: 2005–present

Gabriel Martins (born 22 December 1987) is a Brazilian filmmaker, actor, editor, producer, and musician. He is best known for his social drama films set in Minas Gerais, his home state, including Mars One (2022) and On Behalf of My Son (2026).

== Early life ==
Martins was born in Belo Horizonte, Minas Gerais, on 22 December 1987. Based in the outskirts of Contagem, he graduated from the Free School of Cinema/BH and earned a degree in Social Communication with a specialization in Cinema and Video from the UNA University Center in 2010.

== Career ==
Martins began his filmmaking career around 2005, directing short films. Notable short films directed by Martins during this period include Contagem (2010), Dona Sônia Pediu uma Arma para Seu Vizinho Alcides (2011), Meu Amigo Mineiro (2012), and Rapsódia para o Homem Negro (2015).

Alongside fellow Brazilian filmmakers André Novais Oliveira and Maurílio Martins, and producer Thiago Macêdo Correia, he co-created the producing company Filmes de Plástico (Plastic Films) in 2009. Which is focused in producing projects from local filmmakers of Minas Gerais.

His short film Nothing (2017), had its world premiere at the Directors' Fortnight section of the 2017 Cannes Film Festival. In the same year, he also directed a segment in the omnibus terror film The Devil's Knot (2017).

His first feature film In the Heart of the World (2019), was co-directed with his elder brother Maurilio Martins, and follows the everyday life of Contagem's citizens. The film had its world premiere at the 48th International Film Festival Rotterdam, in competition for the Tiger Award.

Mars One (2022) had its world premiere at the World Cinema Dramatic section of the 2022 Sundance Film Festival on 20 January. It follows a black working class family in the outskirts of Belo Horizonte, and their infant dream of becoming an astrophysicist. It was chosen as Brazil's entry in the 95th Academy Awards, marking the first black filmmaker to be selected.

On Behalf of My Son (2026), had its world premiere in the Platform section of the 2026 Toronto International Film Festival on 12 September, where it competed for the Platform Prize. It will be released globally by Netflix in late 2026.

=== Influences ===
In 2022, in an interview with Itaú Cultural, in which he stated that filmmakers Eduardo Coutinho, Andrea Tonacci, and Carlos Alberto Prates Correia are major influences on his work.

== Filmography ==
=== Feature films ===
| Year | English Title | Original Title | Notes |
|---|---|---|---|
| 2017 | The Devil's Knot | O Nó do Diabo | Co-directed with Ramon Porto, MotaIan Abé, and Jhésus Tribuzi |
| 2019 | In the Heart of the World | No Coração do Mundo | Also editor |
| 2022 | Mars One | Marte Um | Also editor |
| 2026 | On Behalf of My Son | Vicentina Pede Desculpas | Also editor |

=== Television ===
- 2025: Silva' Christmas (Miniseries, 5 episodes)

=== Short films ===
| Year | Title | Notes |
|---|---|---|
| 2005 | 4 Passos | |
| 2006 | Más Notícias para Franco | |
| 2007 | O Choque | |
| 2008 | Beatriz | |
| 2009 | Filme de Sábado | |
| 2009 | No Final do Mundo | |
| 2009 | Gabriel Shaolin Mordock | |
| 2010 | Contagem | Co-directed with Maurilio Martins |
| 2010 | Pelos de Cachorro | Co-directed with Maurilio Martins |
| 2011 | Dona Sônia pediu uma arma para seu vizinho Alcides | |
| 2012 | Meu Amigo Mineiro | Co-directed with Victor Furtado |
| 2014 | Aliança | Co-directed with João Toledo e Leonardo Amaral |
| 2014 | Mundo Incrível Remix | |
| 2015 | Rapsódia para o Homem Negro | |
| 2017 | Nothing | |
| 2022 | Terremoto | |
