= Xica =

1976 film directed by Carlos Diegues

- Brazilian Portuguese: Xica da Silva
- Directed by: Carlos Diegues
- Written by: Antonio Callado; Carlos Diegues
- Based on: Xica da Silva by João Felício dos Santos
- Produced by: Jarbas Barbosa; Airton Correa; Hélio Ferraz; José Oliosi
- Starring: Zezé Motta; Walmor Chagas; José Wilker; Elke Maravilha; Stepan Nercessian
- Cinematography: José Medeiros
- Edited by: Mair Tavares
- Music by: Jorge Ben Jor; Roberto Menescal
- Production companies: J.B. Produções; Distrifilmes
- Distributed by: Embrafilme
- Release date: September 6, 1976
- Running time: 107 minutes
- Country: Brazil
- Language: Portuguese
- Box office: $1.3 million (Brazil)

Xica (Portuguese: Xica da Silva) is a 1976 Brazilian comedy film directed and written by Carlos Diegues, based on the novel by João Felício dos Santos, which is a romanticized retelling of the true story of Chica da Silva, an 18th-century slave in Brazil, who attracts the attention of a powerful Portuguese land-owner and eventually rises into the Brazilian high society. The movie stars Zezé Motta, Walmor Chagas and José Wilker.

It was chosen as the Brazilian submission for the Academy Award for Best Foreign Language Film at the 49th Academy Awards, but it was not nominated.

== Plot ==
The film is based on the 1863 book Memórias do Distrito de Diamantina, written by João Felicio dos Santos (his nephew has a small role in the film as a Roman Catholic pastor). It is a romanticized retelling of the true story of Chica da Silva, an 18th-century African slave in the state of Minas Gerais, who attracts the attention of João Fernandes de Oliveira, a Portuguese sent by Lisbon with the Crown's exclusive contract for mining diamonds, and eventually becomes his lover, rises into power and into the Brazilian high society of the time. Moreover, João quickly lets the intendant and other authorities know that he can be bribed, and gets onto their corruption scheme. Eventually Lisbon hears of João's (and Xica's) excesses and sends an inspector. José, a political radical, is another main character, who provides Xica refuge.

== Cast ==
- Zezé Motta as Xica da Silva (based on Chica da Silva)
- Walmor Chagas as João Fernandes
- Altair Lima as Intendent
- Elke Maravilha as Hortência
- Stepan Nercessian as José
- Rodolfo Arena as Sargeant
- José Wilker as The Count of Valadares
- Marcos Vinicius as Teodoro
- João Felicio dos Santos as pastor

== Reception ==
The film performed well at the Brazilian box office grossing over $1.3 million.

== TV adaptation ==
In 1996, the now defunct TV station Rede Manchete successfully adapted the film plot to the telenovela format, directed by Walter Avancini, written by Walcyr Carrasco and starring Taís Araújo as the title character. This telenovela marked the first time an Afro-Brazilian actress played the lead role on a TV show. In 2005, SBT re-aired Xica da Silva.

== See also ==
- List of submissions to the 49th Academy Awards for Best Foreign Language Film
- List of Brazilian submissions for the Academy Award for Best Foreign Language Film

== Sources ==
Gordon, Richard (2005). "Allegories of Resistance and Reception in Xica da Silva". Luso-Brazilian Review. 42 (1): 44–60. doi:10.1353/lbr.2005.0028. JSTOR 3514051. S2CID 143867441.
