= Chica da Silva =

Brazilian freed slave (c. 1732–1796)

Francisca da Silva de Oliveira (c. 1732–1796), known in history by the name Chica da Silva and whose romanticized version/character is also known by the spelling Xica da Silva, was a Brazilian woman who became famous for becoming rich and powerful despite having been born into slavery. Her life has been a source of inspiration for many works in television, films, music, theater and literature. She is popularly known as the slave who became a queen. The myth of Chica da Silva is often conflated with the historical accounts of Francisca da Silva de Oliveira.

== Biography ==
Francisca da Silva de Oliveira was a parda woman born in Vila do Príncipe (nowadays Serro), in the north of the state of Minas Gerais, in Brazil between 1730 and 1735. Not unlike many other regions in Brazil, in this region the slave population outnumbered whites by a large margin. People in the town made a living either through gold or diamond mining. Francisca lived mainly in Arraial do Tijuco (nowadays known as Diamantina) and was the daughter of a Portuguese man, Antônio Caetano de Sá and an enslaved African woman, Maria da Costa, who was probably from the Gulf of Guinea or Bahia. The region of Minas Gerais was unique in that it had a fairly diverse population in comparison to other slave regions on the Brazilian coast, Caribbean, and the United States.

She was known as "Francisca parda" while enslaved, and her first owner was Domingos da Costa, who was from Milho Verde. After Costa, Francisca was sold to Sergeant Manuel Pires Sardinha, with whom she had her first son, Simão Pires Sardinha. Although Sardinha listed Simão as one of his heirs, Sardinha never officially declared paternity of Simão. Francisca's third master was João Fernandes de Oliveira, a diamond mine owner and mining Governor of Arraial do Tijuco, one of the richest persons of Colonial Brazil. Because Francisca later added "da Silva" as a surname, it is often incorrectly concluded that she was once owned by a José da Silva de Oliveira. The name, however, was (and still is) very common among the Portuguese and offered a fresh start.

Sources suggest that Francisca was granted her freedom, either by José da Silva de Oliveira at the request of João Fernandes or that she was given her freedom directly by João Fernandes when he bought her from Pires Sardinha in 1753. After being granted her freedom, Chica officially changed her name to Francisca da Silva de Oliveira in order to erase her history as a slave. This was hugely beneficial for her son Simão Pires Sardinia who later in life was able hide his mothers slave ancestry and his status of being an illegitimate son in order to receive the prestigious Portuguese title knight of the Order of Christ.

Francisca and João soon started a relationship. Despite not being officially married, they lived together for several years and had 13 children: Francisca de Paula (1755); João Fernandes (1756); Rita (1757); Joaquim (1759); Antonio Caetano (1761); Ana (1762); Helena (1763); Luiza (1764); Antônia (1765); Maria (1766); Quitéria Rita (1767); Mariana (1769); José Agostinho Fernandes (1770). Soon after, Chica became an independent owner of a house in Tejuco on Opera Street. The house was adorned with many luxuries including an extensive garden, her own personal chapel, and furniture like bathtubs, armoires, mirrors and canopy beds, that were rare to households at the time. Chica was also the owner of many slaves who both helped her in the house and worked in the mines in the region. Chica also presented herself in a very ostentatious manner in order to help differentiate herself from the other mixed people in society. People often showed their status through their material items, which for Chica included her clothing, home, slaves, and change in name. By the end of her life she also included Dona at the beginning of her name for a more prestigious title.

In 1770, João Fernandes had to return to Portugal and took along with him the four sons he had with Chica as well as Chica's two other sons Placid Pires Sardinha and Simão Pires Sardinha, who were granted noble titles by the Portuguese court. Their daughters remained with Chica in Brazil and were sent to the then-renowned Convent of Macaúbas. Even after the departure of João to Portugal, Chica retained her prestige. She was a member of the São Francisco do Carmo Brotherhood (exclusive to whites), Mercês Brotherhood (exclusive to mulattos) and the Rosário Brotherhood (exclusive to Africans).

Chica da Silva died in 1796. She was buried at the Church of São Francisco de Assis, a privilege that only wealthy whites enjoyed.

== Gender in Colonial Brazil ==
In eighteenth century Brazil, colonizers and slaves were both overwhelmingly male. Portuguese men had traveled to Brazil alone to seek wealth, as Portuguese women were often banned from migrating. In part due to love affairs and children born between Portuguese men and African and/or mulatta slave women, freed former slaves were predominately female. Stereotypes about non-white women were abundant during the colonial period and while gender, race and color worked together to systemically disadvantage black women, some individuals—such as Chica—used their perceived hyper-sensuality to invert gender and power relations. Once socially mobile, these women were seen as even more dominant than their masters.

Sex was decisive to the relative facilitated access to freedom and concubinage with white men offered advantages to black women because, once free, they reduced the stigma of color and of slavery for them and for their descendants.

== The myth ==
Chica's legacy was often misused to symbolize Brazil's so called "racial democracy." Currently, however, scholars maintain that she used miscegenation and her connections as a tool to achieve a higher social status, as did other African Brazilians at the time. Historian Júnia Ferreira Furtado sustains that concubinage and marriage between white male and black female in colonial Brazilian society was a way found by the enslaved to change their social position.

Manumission, rather than the beginning for the formation of a positive black identity, was the beginning of a process of acceptance of values of the elite, in order to insert them (former slaves) as well as their descendants in this society.

João Fernandes and Chica da Silva's relationship was a scandal in colonial Brazilian society. Chica da Silva, formerly enslaved, had become one of the most powerful women in colonial America. Chica was banished from the parish church, which was reserved for Caucasians only. To show the locals Chica's power, João Fernandes built a luxurious church attended just by herself. However, as Furtado discloses, Chica attended brotherhoods exclusive to whites, as a way to try to fit into the status quo and be aware of its schemes against her and her people.

Chica, as the other freed female slaves, achieved her freedom, loved, had children and raised them up socially sought to reduce the mark that the condition of Parda (brown) and former slave had to herself and to her descendants.

== Works ==
- Xica da Silva (movie): a film released in 1976, by Cacá Diegues, starring Zezé Motta as Chica da Silva.
- Xica da Silva (telenovela): a telenovela released in 1996, written by Walcyr Carrasco and directed by Walter Avancini. It has been successful in several countries around the world. Starring as Xica da Silva, the actress Taís Araújo was the first black Brazilian to be the protagonist of a soap-opera. In 2004 she also played a protagonist again in Rede Globo's Da Cor do Pecado. Taís Araújo continued for a few years one of the only black protagonists in Brazilian soap operas, however more recent works has brought other names into an Afro-centered protagonism beyond her.
- "Xica da Silva," a song by Jorge Ben on his 1976 album África Brasil and featured in the 1976 film Xica
- "Chica da Silva," a song by Boney M from the 1985 album Eye Dance
