= Mars One (film) =

2022 Brazilian film

- International film poster
- Brazilian Portuguese: Marte Um
- Directed by: Gabriel Martins
- Written by: Gabriel Martins
- Produced by: Gabriel Martins; Maurílio Martins; André Novais Oliveira; Thiago Macêdo Correia
- Starring: Cícero Lucas; Carlos Francisco; Camilla Damião; Rejane Faria
- Cinematography: Leonardo Feliciano
- Edited by: Gabriel Martins; Thiago Ricarte
- Music by: Daniel Simitan
- Production companies: Filmes de Plástico; Ancine; Canal Brasil
- Distributed by: Embaúba Filmes
- Release dates: 20 January 2022 (Sundance); 25 August 2022 (Brazil)
- Running time: 115 minutes
- Country: Brazil
- Language: Portuguese

Mars One (Portuguese: Marte Um) is a 2022 Brazilian family drama film written and directed by Gabriel Martins. It tells the story of Deivinho (Cícero Lucas), a Black Brazilian youth who dreams of becoming an astrophysicist and joining a mission to the planet Mars. Deivinho's parents and sister are hard-working and support each other but live precariously on the outskirts of Belo Horizonte. The film dramatizes the social upheaval amongst Brazil's poor that greeted the election of populist Jair Bolsonaro.

The film premiered at the Sundance Film Festival and had a successful run at smaller film festivals, including jury wins at the L.A. Outfest and Nashville Film Festival. It was chosen as Brazil's entry in the 95th Academy Awards, but it was not nominated. It is distributed by ARRAY Releasing and went into wide release on Netflix (only in the USA) in January 2023.

== Plot ==
The film follows a family of four in Belo Horizonte, Brazil. The youngest, Deivinho (Cícero Lucas), is on the cusp of adolescence. Curious and imaginative, his dream is to become an astrophysicist and join a Mars One mission in 2030 in order to begin colonizing the red planet. While his hopes give the film an organizing motive, screen time is shared amongst all four members. His older sister Eunice (Camilla Damião) is almost to adulthood. Although loving, she chafes against traditional family roles and the idea of remaining homebound. She begins a romantic relationship with another young woman and fears telling her parents, particularly her traditional father, Wellington (Carlos Francisco).

Much of the film's action centres on the children's relationship with the patriarch. Wellington is doting and emotionally demonstrative but he can be temperamental and often imposes his own aspirations on his daughter and son. Having been an avid footballer as a youth, he insists Deivinho play soccer; the boy is indifferent to the game and plays only to please him. The family's finances are precarious and Wellington works long hours in pool cleaning and landscaping. At the outset of the film, he has been sober for four years. Mother Tercia (Rejane Faria) often plays the role of family mediator and also works hard as an outside housekeeper to pay the household bills. Early in the film she is subject to a hidden camera prank—a seemingly emotionally deranged man lets off a dummy stick of dynamite in a diner beside her—prompting headaches and a coinciding series of unfortunate events. She comes to believe she is cursed as the film progresses, adding a darkly comic subthread.

Family conflicts eventually reach a head. Wellington erupts in anger in front Eunice's new girlfriend, Joana (Ana Hilãrio), and Eunice proceeds with a plan to leave home. Later, Deivinho faces a conflict: his father insists he attend a soccer tryout after an invitation from footballer Juan Pablo Sorin. On the same Saturday, the boy planned to visit a science fair featuring astrophysicist Neil Degrasse Tyson. Deivinho, playing outside against his father's wishes the day before, breaks his leg riding a bicycle, rendering both plans moot.

Wellington faces his own difficulties at the same time: his wealthy boss has asked he tend to her plants and pet while she vacations. Needing to leave early two days before the tryout, he entrusts the keys to a coworker, Flavio (Russo Apr). Flavio is seemingly gregarious but tends to long tirades against bourgeois wealth. Tellingly, the request to look after the apartment comes while both men are watching news of Bolsonaro's mandate on television. Wellington returns to work the morning after trusting the keys to Flavio to discover the apartment has been robbed and emptied of all its valuables. He is fired.

Returning home to tell the family of his job loss, Wellington discovers the soccer tryout is also out of the question. He explodes, cursing in front of his family, despite remonstrations from Eunice and Tercia. That night he drinks heavily. The film concludes with Wellington's contrition. He returns to Alcoholic's Anonymous with his wife and daughter attending. He tells Eunice outside that she can offer an apology to Joana; Eunice accepts this but says he ought to offer the apology himself. The family gathers to view Mars on Deivinho's homemade telescope. Wellington asks how far away the planet is and whether Deivinho would like to visit, telling his son "we'll find a way."

== Cast ==
- Cícero Lucas as Deivinho
- Carlos Francisco as Wellington
- Camilla Damião as Eunice (Nina)
- Rejane Faria as Tercia
- Ana Hilãrio as Joana
- Russo Apr as Flavio
- Instagram influencer Tokinho and footballer Juan Pablo Sorin have cameo roles as themselves.

== Production ==
Afro-Brazilian director, screenwriter, and cinematographer Gabriel Martins is the creative force behind the film. Martins is a graduate of Centro Universitário UNA and launched Filmes de Plástico in 2009 with André Novais Oliveira and Maurílio Martins, who are credited as producers on Mars One. The film was shot just after the 2018 Brazilian general election. It was produced with public funds in order to promote Black filmmakers and narratives, a fact made poignant after Bolsonaro's election and the subsequent reversal of civil rights gains in Brazil.

Magnolia Pictures purchased the rights to the film just prior to its debut at the Sundance Film Festival in January, 2022. The distributor touted an "uplifting and tender film about a family’s hopes and dreams, set against a Brazil in constant turmoil.” Magnolia guided the film through a successful film festival run before negotiating the sale of the rights to Ava DuVernay’s distribution banner ARRAY Releasing in late 2022. Netflix launched the movie on its streaming service on January 5, 2023 while ARRAY retains distribution rights in English-speaking countries.

== Reception ==
The film was well received. The Hollywood Reporter called it "a gracefully composed observation of a working-class Brazilian family, is littered with arresting shots." The review applauded the juxtaposition of family and political life: "big political moments and small personal wins; loud triumphs and quiet failures; momentous days and devastating ones." Indie Wire provided the film an -A calling it an "elegant personal portrait."

On the review aggregator website Rotten Tomatoes, 97% of 34 critics' reviews are positive, with an average rating of 7.8/10. The website's consensus reads: "An earthbound story with its eyes on the stars, Mars One finds universally resonant themes within one Brazilian family's specific struggles." Metacritic, which uses a weighted average, assigned the film a score of 82 out of 100, based on 10 critics, indicating "universal acclaim".

== See also ==
- List of submissions to the 95th Academy Awards for Best International Feature Film
- List of Brazilian submissions for the Academy Award for Best International Feature Film
