= Bárbara Paz =

Brazilian actress (born 1974)

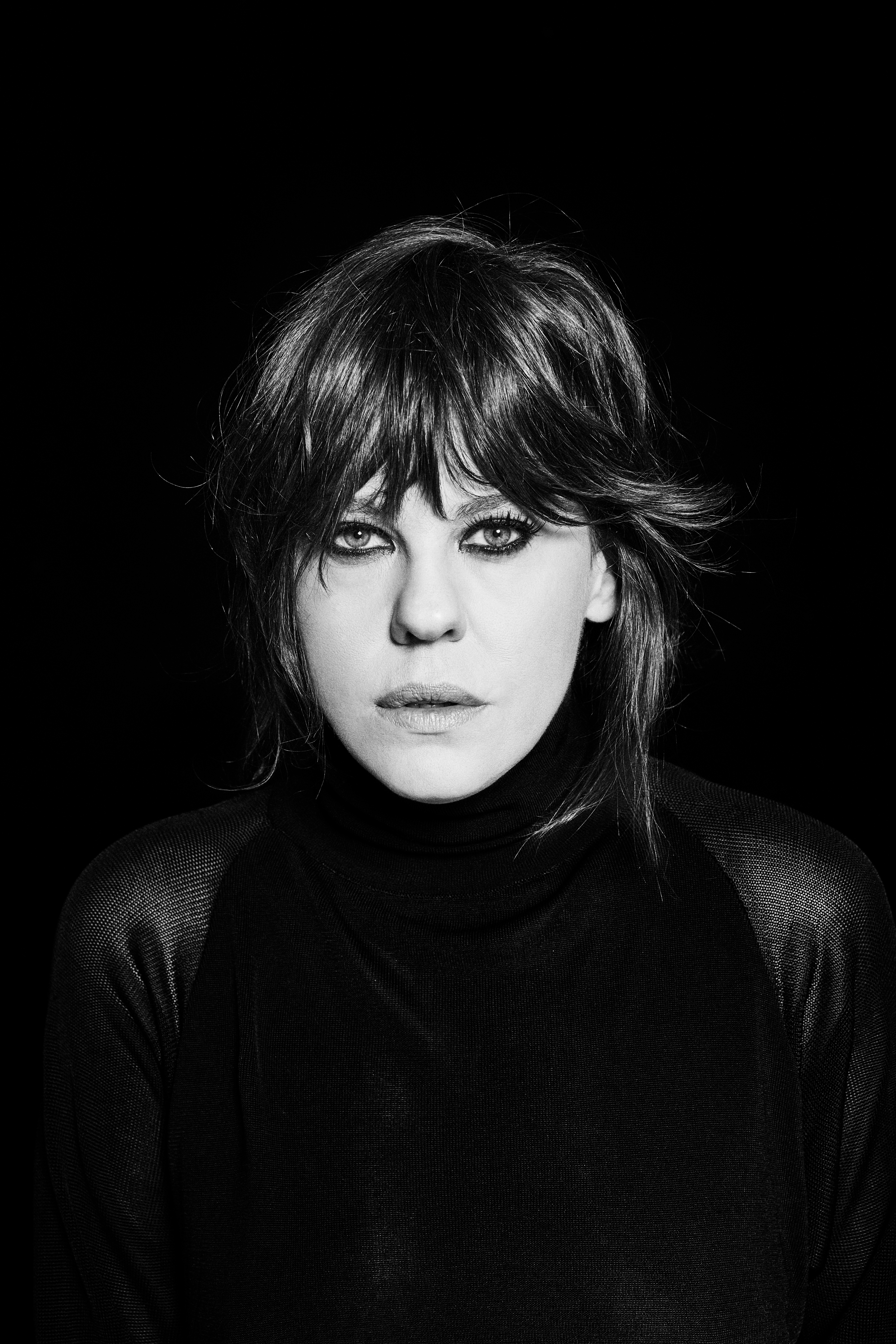
- Paz in 2019
- Born: Bárbara Raquel Paz; 17 October 1974 (age 50); Campo Bom, Rio Grande do Sul, Brazil
- Occupation(s): Actress, producer, film director
- Years active: 1997–present
- Partner: Hector Babenco (2010–2016)

Bárbara Raquel Paz (born 17 October 1974) is a Brazilian actress, producer, and director.

== Life and career ==
Paz graduated from the Macunaíma Theatre School and from the Antunes Centre for Theatre Research (CPT) and is a long-standing member of TAPA, a São Paulo based performing arts group. She has performed in over 25 plays by a wide range of playwrights from Oscar Wilde to Tennessee Williams.

In 2013, in recognition of her distinguished acting career, the Ministry of Culture awarded her the Medalha Cavaleiro (Knight's Medal). Paz is also under permanent contract to TV Globo and has played in many of their soap operas and mini-series. She is the presenter of the Canal Brasil programme A Arte do Encontro (The Art of the Interview) in which she converses with well-known figures in Brazilian culture.

She has performed in various feature length and short films, including Hector Babenco’s final film My Hindu Friend in which she played opposite Willem Dafoe. She has also ventured into the area of shorts, producing and directing television programmes and other films. The documentary Babenco - Tell Me When I Die is her first feature-length film. Its première was at the Venice Film Festival 2019 where it won Best Documentary in the official Venice Classics competition, and also the Independent Critics Prize - Bisato D'oro. The film also received Brazil’s Official Selection for Best International Feature for the 2020 Oscars.

== Filmography ==
=== Television ===
Year	Title	Role	Notes
2000	Ô... Coitado!	Marta/Glorinha	Participation
2001	Acampamento Legal	Guardian of the Portal	Participation
2001	Sandy & Júnior	Tereza	Participation
2001	As Filhas da Mãe	Caroline Alves	Participation
2001	Casa dos Artistas	Participant / Winner	Season 1
2002	Marisol	Marisol Lima do Vale (Verônica)	Main role
2005	A Diarista	Nini Potranca	Episode: "Infeliz Aniversário, Marinete"
2006	Cristal	Inocência Perez	
2007	Maria Esperança	Maria Muniz Hurtado Trajano Queiroz	Main role
2008	Alice	Guiga	Participation
2009	Unidos do Livramento	Leontina	
2009	Força-Tarefa	Laura Barreto	Episode: "Quadrilha de Ladrões de Carga"
2009	Viver a Vida	Renata Ferreira	
2010	As Cariocas	Denise	Episode: "A Vingativa do Méier"
2011	Morde & Assopra	Virgínia Lolatto	
2011	Curta na Estrada	Presenter	
2012	Dança dos Famosos	Participant	Temporada 9
2013	Amor à Vida	Edith Sobral Khoury	
2014	O Caçador	Taís	Episode: "June 27, 2014"
2014	A Mulher da Sua Vida	Herself	Fantástico series
2014	Dupla Identidade	Ana	Episode: "October 31, 2014"
2015	Acredita na Peruca	Luana Capricci	Participation Special
2015	A Regra do Jogo	Ana Elisa Barroso Stewart (Nelita)	
2016	A Arte do Encontro	Presenter	
2017	Malhação	Stella	Episode: "January 11–19, 2017"
2017	O Outro Lado do Paraíso	Joana Medeiros (Jô)	
2019	Assédio	Lorena	Episode: "O Julgamento"
2022	Além da Ilusão	Úrsula Alves	

=== Film ===
Year	Title	Role	Notes
2000	De Cara Limpa	Carol	
2002	Não Perca a Cabeça	Gostosa	Short film
2002	Seja o que Deus Quiser!	Tati	
2002	Cama de Gato	Woman cop	
2003	Produto Descartável	Neighbor	Short film
2003	Ilha Rá-tim-bum: O Martelo de Vulcano	Polca	
2003	Vinte e Cinco	Teresa	Short film
2004	Amigo Secreto	Sueli	Short film
2004	Sexo e a Metrópole	Flávia	Short film
2005	Manual Para Atropelar Cachorro	Wanessa	Short film
2005	Quanto Vale ou É por Quilo?	—	
2006	5 Mentiras	A atriz histéria	Short film
2007	O Papel das Dobras	Prostituta	Short film
2008	Quarto 38	Luisa	Short film
2009	3.33	Sara	Short film
2012	Quinta das Janelas	Lalinha	Short film
2013	Se Puder...Dirija!	Márcia	
2013	Gata Velha Ainda Mia	Carol	
2015	Depois de Tudo	Manu	
2016	Meu Amigo Hindu	Sophia Guerra	
2019	Babenco: Tell Me When I Die	—	Director and Producer

== Stage ==
Ano	Titulo	Direção
1997	Memórias da Infância	Beth Lopes
1999	Romeu e Julieta e Suas Facetas	Geraldine Quaglia
1999	O Gato de Botas	Paulino Rafanti
1999	Grogue	Debora Dubois
1999	Poemas Fesceninos	Hugo Possolo
1999	Mistérios Gulosos	Hugo Possolo
2000	Um Chopes, Dois Pastel e Uma Porção de Bobagem	Hugo Possolo
2000	Água Fora da Bacia	Hugo Possolo
2000	Os Mané	Hugo Possolo
2001	Projeto Pantagruel	Hugo Possolo
2001	Farsa Quixotesca	Hugo Possolo
2002	Suburbia	Franscisco Medeiros
2002	As Viúvas	Sandra Corveloni
2002-05	A Importância de Ser Fiel	Eduardo Tolentino
2003	Vestir o Pai	Paulo Autran
2004	A Quarta Irmã (leitura dramática)	Eduardo Tolentino
2004	A Babá	Bibi Ferreira
2004	Arsênico e Alfazema	Alexandre Reinecke
2005	Madame de Sade	Roberto Lage
2005	Os Sete Gatinhos	Alexandre Reinecke
2006	Contos de Sedução	Eduardo Tolentino
2006	A Gata Borralheira	Débora Dubois
2007	Felizes para Sempre	Mário Bortoloto
2008	Às Favas com os Escrúpulos	Jô Soares
2010-14	Hell	Hector Babenco
2014	Vênus em Visom	Hector Babenco
2014	A Toca do Coelho	Dan Stulbach
2016	Gata em Telhado de Zinco Quente	Eduardo Tolentino
2018	A Teoria da Incerteza	Guilherme Piva

== Awards and nominations ==
Year	Award	Category	Work	Result
2003	Festival de Gramado	Best Actress (Curtas e Médias Metragens em 16MM)	Produto Descartável	Won
2006	Vitória Cine Vídeo	Best Actress	Manual para atropelar cachorro	Won
2010	Prêmio Contigo! de TV	Best Supporting Actress	Viver a Vida	Nominated
2010	Prêmio Arte Qualidade Brasil	Best Supporting Actress	Viver a Vida	Nominated
2011	Prêmio Quem	Best Stage Actress	Hell	Won
2014	Prêmio Quem de Televisão	Best Supporting Actress	Amor á Vida	Nominated
2014	Prêmio Shell	Best Actress	Vênus em Visom	Nominated
2014	8º Prêmio APTR	Best Actress	Vênus em Visom	Nominated
2016	Prêmio Arte Qualidade Brasil	Best Actress in a Drama	Gata em Telhado de Zinco Quente	Nominated
2016	Troféu APCA	Best Actress	Gata em Telhado de Zinco Quente	Nominated
2019	Venice International Film Festival	Best Documentary on Cinema	Babenco: Tell Me When I Die	Won
2019	Bisato D'oro	Best Documentary	Babenco: Tell Me When I Die	Won
2020	Festival de Viña del Mar	Best Documentary	Babenco: Tell Me When I Die	Won
2020	MIFF 2020 Mumbai International Film Festival	Best Documentary	Babenco: Tell Me When I Die	Won
2020	IDF 2020 West Lake International Documentary Festival	Special Mention	Babenco: Tell Me When I Die	Won
2020	GZDOC 2020 Guangzhou International Documentary Film Festival	Best first Feature Documentary	Babenco: Tell Me When I Die	Won
