= Corupá =

- Municipality
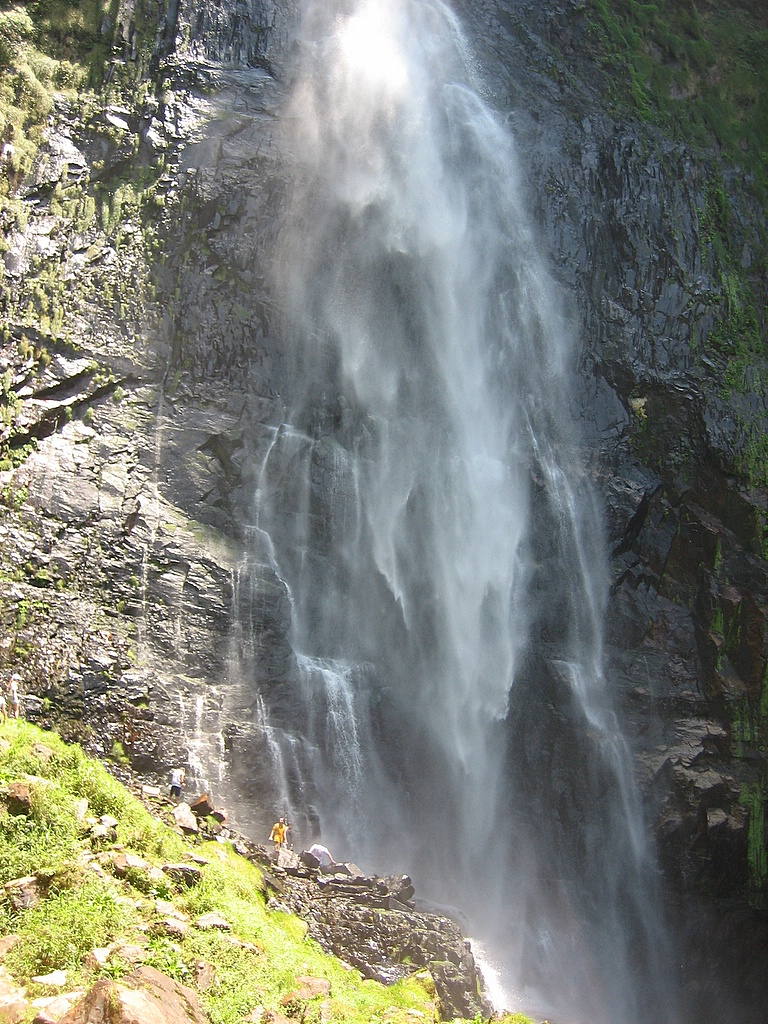
- Corupá

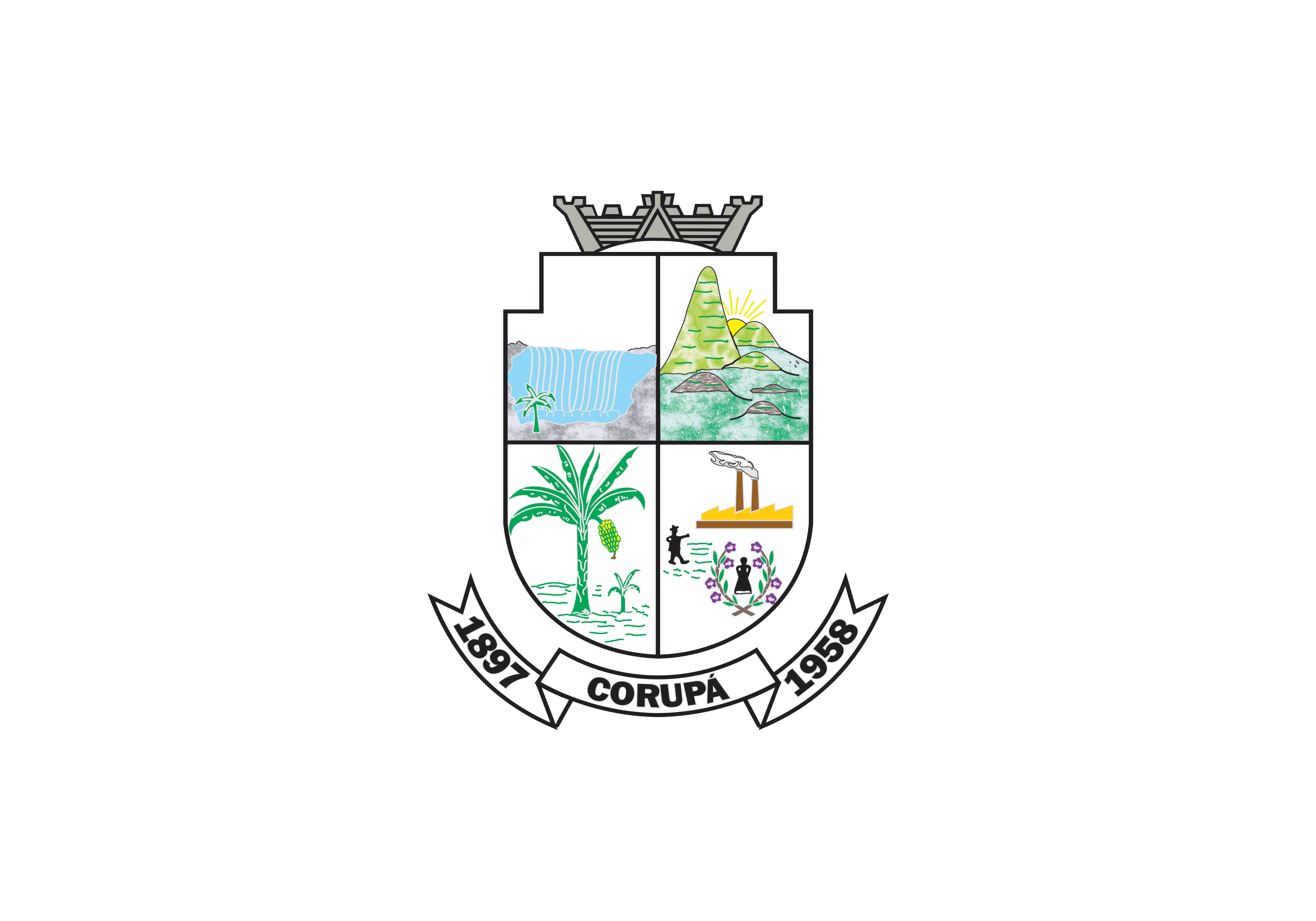
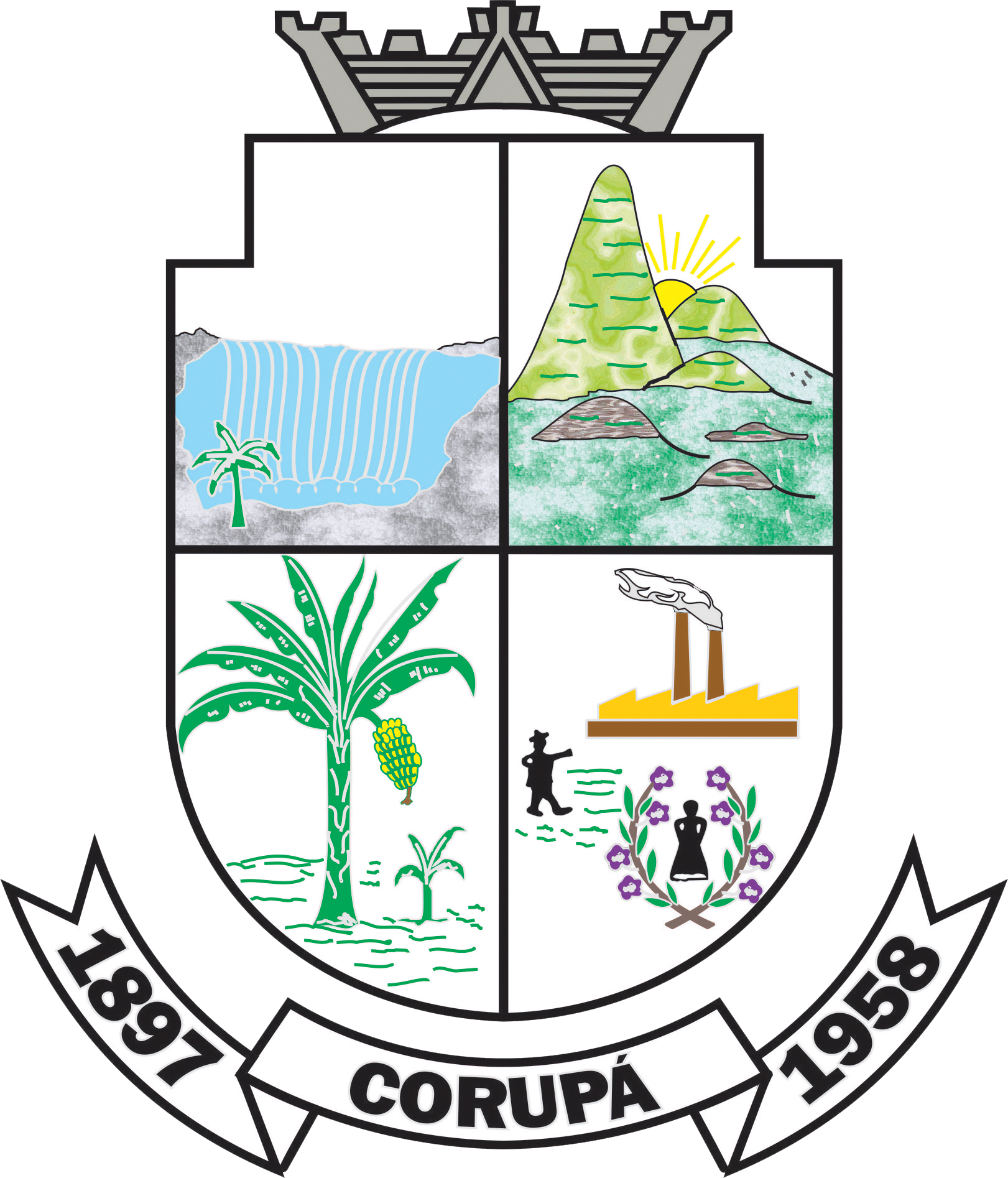
- Flag Coat of arms

- Location in Brazil
- Coordinates: 26°26′S 49°14′W
- Country: Brazil
- Region: South
- State: Santa Catarina
- Mesoregion: North
- Microregion: Itapocu Valley

Government
  - Mayor: Nininho Eipper

Area
  - Total: 10,550 km^{2} (4,072 sq mi)
  - Land: 10,540 km^{2} (4,068 sq mi)
- Elevation: 75 m (246 ft)

Population (2020)
  - Total: 16,107
  - Density: 12.6/km^{2} (32.7/sq mi)
- Time zone: UTC -3
- Area code: 47
- Website: www.corupa.sc.gov.br

Corupá is a municipality of the state of Santa Catarina, located in the South Region of Brazil. It has approximately 16,000 inhabitants distributed over 407 km². It is located in the Valley Itapocu near Joinville. Its economy is based on the metallurgical industry and in the production of bananas.

== See also ==
- List of municipalities in Santa Catarina
