= Carlos Diegues =

Brazilian film director (1940–2025)

- Diegues in 2019
- Born: 19 May 1940; Maceió, Alagoas, Brazil
- Died: 14 February 2025 (aged 84); Rio de Janeiro, Brazil
- Other name: Cacá Diegues
- Occupations: Film director, screenwriter
- Years active: 1959–2025
- Spouses: Nara Leão (m. 1967–1977); Renata Almeida Magalhães (m. 1981)

Carlos Diegues (also known as Cacá Diegues; 19 May 1940 – 14 February 2025) was a Brazilian film director, best known as a member of the Cinema Novo movement. He was popularly known for his unconventional, yet intriguing film techniques among other film producers of the Cinema Novo movement. Diegues was also widely known for his dynamic use of visuals, ideas, plots, themes, and other cinematic techniques. He incorporated many musical acts in his film as he favored musical pieces to be complementary to his ideas. Diegues remained very popular and is regarded as one of the great cinematic producers of his generation. He produced films, plays, musicals, and other forms of entertainment in Brazil.

Diegues' contributions to Brazilian cinema developed the film industry. He would pioneer the most expensive film projects that domestic filmmakers had ever seen. Films such as Bye Bye Brazil were two million dollar projects, and later, films such as God is Brazilian were over 10 million dollars. This was a new era in Brazil, as domestic directors had yet to produce any films with that kind of financial support.

Diegues admitted to using Brazilians in his films as much as he could. He used extras, film technicians, painters, sculptors, and other essential personnel of Brazilian backgrounds even if they were inexperienced. Diegues attempted to consistently represent the underrepresented people of Brazil in his films. He suggested that history is written by the winners and the Afro-Brazilian communities were not among those who were given a chance to write their own history. He also proposed the idea that up until this movement, cinema in Brazil only provided the white Brazilian experience despite the growing masses of black Brazilians all over the country. He was known for distinguished publications that uplift the Afro-Brazilian spirit and bodies.

In 2018, Diegues was elected to the Brazilian Academy of Letters.

== Personal life ==
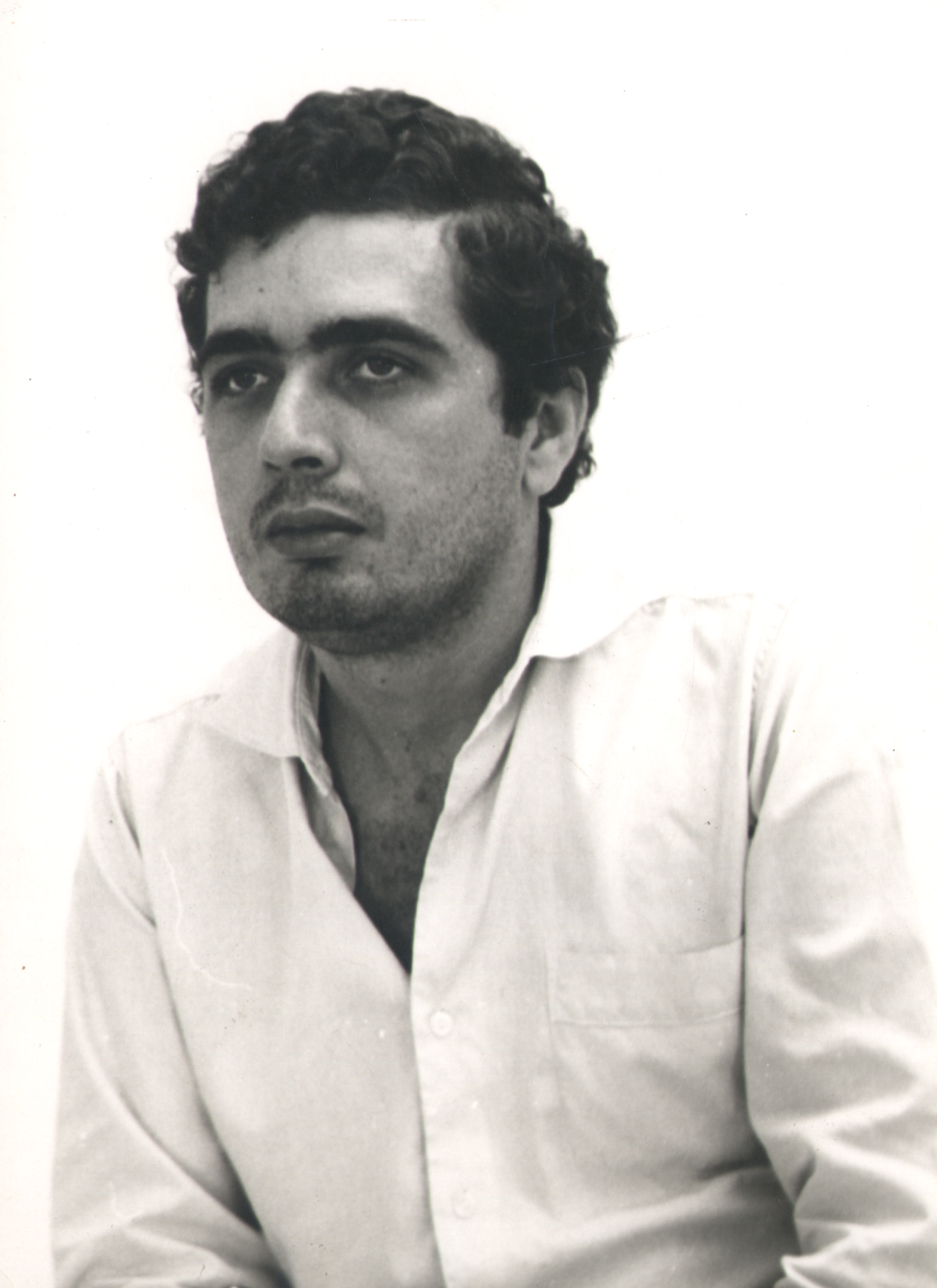
Diegues in 1972

Carlos Diegues attended the Pontificia Universidade Católica in Rio de Janeiro. In 1959 he began his legal studies at the university. A university engaged with political affairs, Diegues immersed himself in political activism through the Juventude Universitária Católica (Catholic Youth Movement) and the Centros Populares de Cultura (Popular Cultural Centers) (CPC). As a left leaning student, he pursued filmmaking as he applied his deep understanding of social criticism in his works. or CPCs, both originating in leftist student politics. In the CPCs Diegues started his career as a filmmaker.

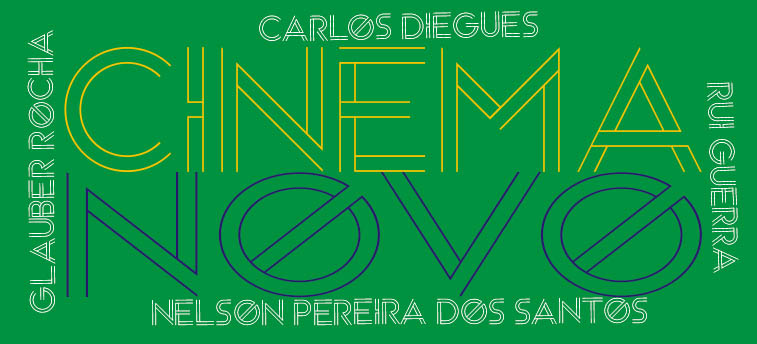
Cinema Novo

Diegues later went on to become an integral participant of the Cinco Vezes Favela and produced the episode Escola de Samba: Alegría de vivir in 1962. Doing so, he criticized the Carnival and suggested workers should unionize and demand workers rights. His work painted a bleak picture of what was the reality. Depicting landlords and leaders in charge as figures who upheld an inequitable world. His film sparked mixed emotions, but most importantly, it gave the working masses hope for change. This was the beginning of an era in film known as Cinema Novo. In the 60s the films associated with Cinema Novo explicitly talked about the unfair treatment of people under the status quo. The leftist ideas by filmmakers like Diegues and other important figures would allow the Cinema Novo to flourish.

As the dictatorship reached full force in the late 1960s the CPC could no longer operate as regularly for the members. As a result, Diegues and other filmmakers were forced to redirect the paths of their careers. In his earliest works Diegues created Joana Francesa by 1975, when the dictatorship repressed and censored most of the media and entertainment industries. This film alluded to the ideas of inequality and injustice but it also garnered criticism by the left as they suggested it was not as intricate or heavily influenced by the social commentary Diegues had used before. After the regime's collapse Diegues returned to a more explicit approach he was once heavily praised for, however, he still produced films during the repression that garnered international attention such as Bye Bye Brazil.

Diegues died of complications before a surgery in Rio de Janeiro, on 14 February 2025, at the age of 84.

== Filmography ==
Key
†	Indicates a documentary	‡	Indicates a short film

List of films directed by Carlos Diegues
Year	Original title	English release title(s)	Language(s)	Notes
1960	Fuga ^{‡}			
1960	Brasília ^{‡}		Portuguese	
1961	Domingo ^{‡}		Portuguese	
1962	Escola de Samba Alegria de Viver ^{‡}		Portuguese	Segment of Cinco Vezes Favela (1962)
1963	Ganga Zumba		Portuguese	
1965	A Oitava Bienal ^{‡}		Portuguese	
1966	A Grande Cidade	The Big City	Portuguese	Also known as A Grande Cidade ou As Aventuras e Desventuras de Luzia e Seus 3 Amigos Chegados de Longe.
1967	Oito Universitários ^{‡}		Portuguese	Co-directed with David Neves.
1970	Os Herdeiros	The Heirs / The Inheritors	Portuguese	
1971	Receita de Futebol ^{‡}		Portuguese	
1972	Quando o Carnaval Chegar	When Carnival Comes	Portuguese	
1973	Joanna Francesa	Jeanne the Frenchwoman	Portuguese	Brazilian-French production.
1974	Cinema Íris ^{‡}		Portuguese	
1975	Aníbal Machado ^{‡}		Portuguese	
1976	Xica da Silva	Xica / Xica da Silva	Portuguese	
1978	Chuvas de Verão	A Summer Rain / Summer Showers	Portuguese	
1980	Bye Bye Brasil	Bye Bye Brazil	Portuguese	
1984	Quilombo		Portuguese	
1985	Batalha da Alimentação ^{‡}		Portuguese	
1986	Batalha do Transporte ^{‡}		Portuguese	
1987	Um Trem para as Estrelas	Subway to the Stars	Portuguese	
1989	Dias Melhores Virão	Better Days Ahead	Portuguese	
1990	Exército de Um Homem Só ^{‡}		Portuguese	Music video for Engenheiros do Hawaii.
1994	Veja Esta Canção	Rio's Love Song	Portuguese	
1996	Tieta do Agreste	Tieta of Agreste	Portuguese	Based on Tieta, by Jorge Amado.
1999	Orfeu		Portuguese	Based on Orfeu da Conceição, by Vinicius de Moraes.
1999	Reveillon 2000 ^{‡}		Portuguese	
2000	Carnaval dos 500 Anos ^{‡}		Portuguese	
2003	Deus É Brasileiro	God Is Brazilian	Portuguese	
2006	O Maior Amor do Mundo	The Greatest Love of All	Portuguese	
2006	Nenhum Motivo Explica a Guerra ^{†}		Portuguese	Co-directed with Rafael Dragaud. Documentary on the Grupo Cultural AfroReggae.
2013	Vinte: RioFilme, 20 Anos de Cinema Brasileiro ^{†}		Portuguese	
2013	Rio de Fé ^{†}		Portuguese	
2018	O Grande Circo Místico	The Great Mystical Circus	Portuguese	
