= Héctor Babenco =

Argentine-Brazilian film director (1946–2016)

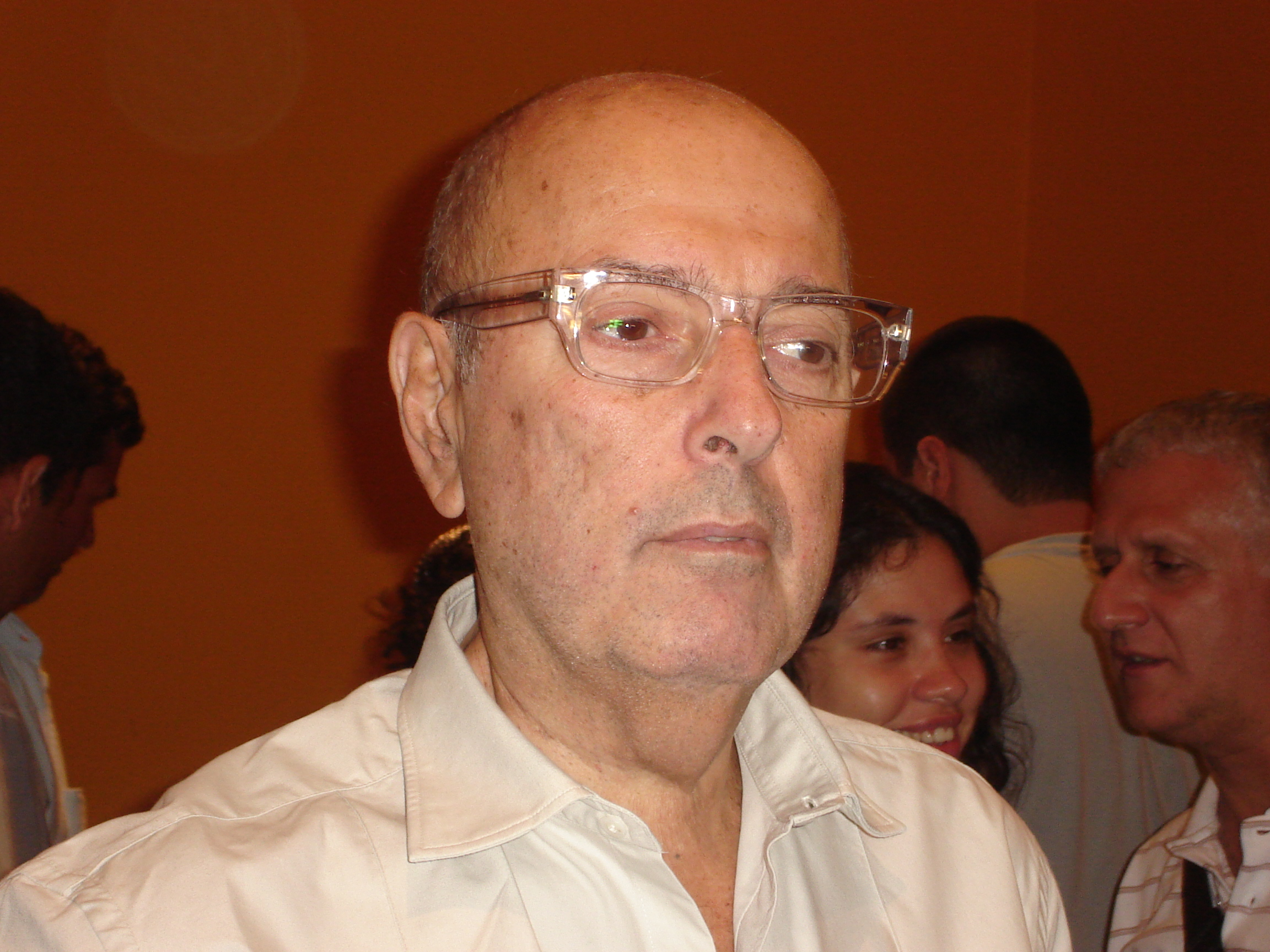
- Babenco in São Paulo, Brazil (2008)
- Born: Héctor Eduardo Babenco; February 7, 1946; Buenos Aires, Argentina
- Died: July 13, 2016 (aged 70); São Paulo, Brazil
- Occupations: Film director and producer, screenwriter
- Years active: 1973–2015
- Notable work: Pixote; Kiss of the Spider Woman; Ironweed; At Play in the Fields of the Lord; Carandiru

Héctor Eduardo Babenco (February 7, 1946 – July 13, 2016) was an Argentine-born Brazilian film director, screenwriter, producer and actor who worked in several countries including Brazil, Argentina, and the United States. He was one of the first Brazilian filmmakers to gain international critical acclaim, through his films which often dealt with social outcasts on the fringes of society. His best-known works include Pixote (1980), Kiss of the Spider Woman (1985), Ironweed (1987), At Play in the Fields of the Lord (1990) and Carandiru (2003).

Babenco's films brought him several accolades. He was nominated three times for the Palme d'Or of the Cannes Film Festival, and was nominated for an Academy Award for Best Director for Kiss of the Spider Woman. He won the Grande Prêmio do Cinema Brasileiro twice, and the Prêmio ACIE de Cinema once.

== Early life ==
Babenco was born in Buenos Aires and raised in Mar del Plata. His mother, Janka Haberberg, was a Polish Jewish immigrant, and his father, Jaime Babenco, was an Argentine gaucho of Ukrainian Jewish origin. Babenco lived in Europe from 1964 to 1968. In 1969, he decided to stay in São Paulo, Brazil, permanently.

== Career ==
His first solo feature film as a director was O Rei da Noite (King of the Night) (1975), starring Paulo José and Marília Pêra.

Babenco had an international success with Pixote – A lei do mais fraco (1981). It concerns Brazil's abandoned children. In the words of E. Ruby Rich while it concerns "a pair of boys who form a symbiotic sexual union", the film cannot "be held up as an example of how gay desire can be depicted, given its sensationalistic and sordid treatment of gay sex as accommodation, substitution, and punishment". The film featured impressive work of young actor Fernando Ramos da Silva, 10 years old at the time, who was discovered in the suburbs of São Paulo. The film received numerous prizes, including nomination for Best Foreign Film at the 1982 Golden Globes Awards.

For Kiss of the Spider Woman (1985), Babenco was nominated for the Academy Award for Best Director, the first Latin American to be nominated in this category.

He directed some of the most respected American actors of his time, including William Hurt, John Lithgow, Raul Julia, Jack Nicholson, Meryl Streep, Tom Berenger, Daryl Hannah, Aidan Quinn and Kathy Bates.

In 2012 Babenco was part of the jury in the 34th Moscow International Film Festival.

His last film was My Hindu Friend (2015), which stars Willem Dafoe. It recounts the story of a film director close to death.

== Personal life ==
In 2010, Babenco married actress Bárbara Paz. He was previously married to Xuxa Lopes and Raquel Arnaud. He was the father of two daughters, Janka Babenco and Myra Arnaud Babenco, from his previous marriages, and also had two grandchildren.

Babenco is depicted in Bárbara Paz's 2019 documentary film Babenco: Tell Me When I Die.

== Health issues and death ==
In 1994, Babenco fell ill and had to undergo a bone marrow transplant to treat a lymphatic cancer, a diagnosis which he had since he was 38 years old.

On July 12, 2016, Babenco was admitted to Hospital Sírio-Libanês to treat sinusitis. The following night, he suffered a cardiac arrest, and died shortly thereafter.

== Filmography ==
Year	Original title	English release title	Functioned as			Country	Notes
Year	Original title	English release title	Director	Writer	Producer	Country	Notes
1975	O Rei da Noite	King of the Night	Yes	Yes	Yes	Brazil	Directorial Debut; Co-writer with Orlando Senna
1977	Lúcio Flávio: O Passageiro da Agonia	Lúcio Flávio	Yes	Yes	No	Brazil	Co-writer with José Louzeiro & Jorge Durán
1980	Pixote: A Lei do Mais Fraco	Pixote	Yes	Yes	Yes	Brazil	Co-writer with Jorge Durán
1985	Kiss of the Spider Woman		Yes	No	No	Brazil; United States	
1987	Ironweed		Yes	No	No	United States	
1991	At Play in the Fields of the Lord		Yes	Yes	No	Brazil; United States	Co-writer with Jean-Claude Carrière & Vincent Patrick
1998	Corazón Iluminado	Foolish Heart	Yes	Yes	Yes	Brazil; Argentina; France	Co-writer with Ricardo Piglia
2003	Carandiru		Yes	Yes	Yes	Brazil; Argentina; Italy	Co-writer with Fernando Bonassi & Victor Navas
2007	El Pasado	The Past	Yes	Yes	Yes	Brazil; Argentina	Co-writer with Marta Goes
2014	Words with Gods		Yes	Yes	No	Mexico; United States	Segment: "The Man That Stole a Duck"
2015	Meu Amigo Hindu	My Hindu Friend	Yes	Yes	Yes	Brazil	

=== Documentaries ===
Year	Original title	English release title	Functioned as			Country	Notes
Year	Original title	English release title	Director	Writer	Producer	Country	Notes
1973	O Fabuloso Fittipaldi	-	Yes	Yes	Yes	Brazil	Co-directed with Roberto Farias
1984	A Terra É Redonda como Uma Laranja	-	Yes	No	No	Brazil; Argentina	

=== Television ===
Year	Original title	English release title	Functioned as			Country	Notes
Year	Original title	English release title	Director	Writer	Producer	Country	Notes
2005	Carandiru: Outras Histórias	-	Yes	Yes	Yes	Brazil	Episodes: "Love Story I" & "Love Story II"

=== Acting roles ===
Year	Original title	English release title	Role	Director	Country	Notes
1999	The Venice Project		Danilo Danuzzi	Robert Dornhelm	United States	
2000	Before Night Falls		Virgilio Piñera	Julian Schnabel	United States	
2007	El Pasado	The Past	Projectionist	Himself	Brazil; Argentina	Cameo

== Awards and nominations ==
Awards and nominations earned for Babenco's films
Year	Film	Academy Awards		BAFTA Awards		Golden Globe Awards	
Year	Film	Nominations	Wins	Nominations	Wins	Nominations	Wins
1980	Pixote					1	
1985	Kiss of the Spider Woman	4	1	1	1	4	
1987	Ironweed	2				1	
1991	At Play in the Fields of the Lord					1	
Total		6	1	1	1	7	

Directed Academy Award performances
Under Babenco's direction, these actors have received Academy Award nominations (and one win) for their performances in these respective roles.

Year	Performer	Film	Result
Academy Award for Best Actor
1986	William Hurt	Kiss of the Spider Woman	Won
1988	Jack Nicholson	Ironweed	Nominated
Academy Award for Best Actress
1988	Meryl Streep	Ironweed	Nominated
