= Valentina Herszage =

Brazilian actress (born 1998)

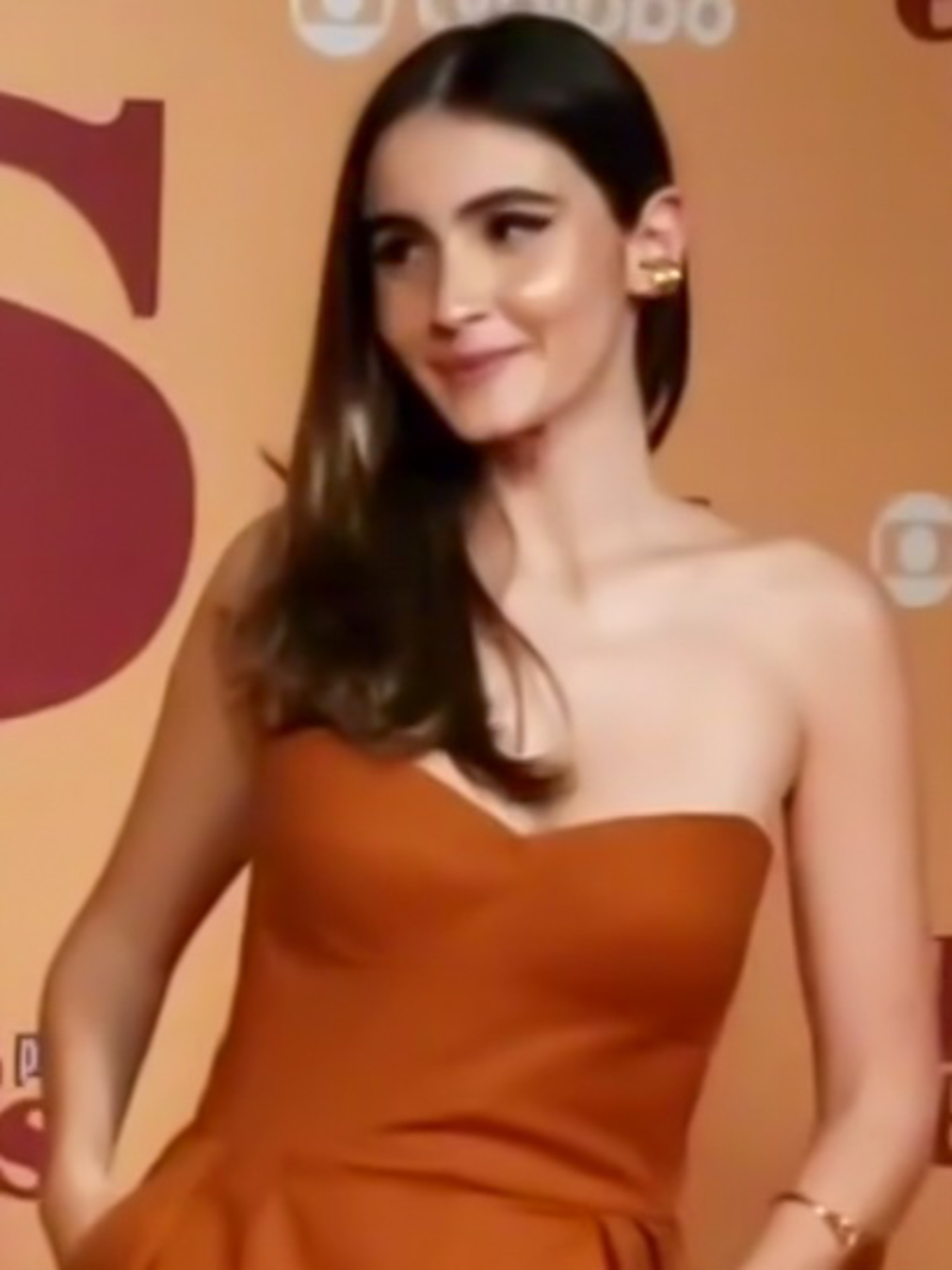
- Herszage in 2023
- Born: March 11, 1998 (age 28); Rio de Janeiro, Brazil
- Occupation: Actress
- Years active: 2009–present
- Awards: 2015 - Festival do Rio - Best Actress

Valentina Herszage (Portuguese: [valẽˈtʃinɐ iʁsˈzaʒi]; born March 11, 1998) is a Brazilian actress.

== Career ==
Valentina participated in the New Theater Course at Universidade Cândido Mendes, in Ipanema, Rio de Janeiro and at Catsapá Escola de Musicais. As a child, in 2009, she starred in the children's short film Direita É a Mão que Você Escreve, by director Paulo Santos, shown in 2010 at the Florianópolis Children's Film Festival. In 2015, she participated in the film Mate-Me Por Favor as Bia and received the Redentor Trophy for Actress at the 2015 edition of the Rio Festival. In 2016, she acted in the play Jovem Estudante Procura.

In 2017, she debuted on television in the soap opera Pega Pega on Rede Globo as Bebeth Ribeiro.

In 2019, she played Hebe Camargo in her youth, in the Globoplay miniseries Hebe, sharing the role with actress Andrea Beltrão. In the same year, she shot the feature film The Seven Sorrows of Mary, by Portuguese director Pedro Varela and, in November, she starred in the film Raquel 1:1, by Mariana Bastos, released at SXSW in 2022. She also participated in the film Homem Onça, by Vinicius Reis. At the theater, Valentina is part of the cast of the Brazilian production of Lazarus, by David Bowie and Enda Walsh.

In 2020, she remotely recorded the film Álbum em Família, by Daniel Belmonte, about a group of actors who meet virtually to stage a play by Nelson Rodrigues. In 2022, she recorded the series Fim, based on the novel by Fernanda Torres. She plays the nurse Maria Clara, who takes care of Ciro, Fabio Assunção's role in old age. In August, she recorded the film As Polacas, in the role of the protagonist Rebeca, a Jewish woman who flees Poland to start a new, better life in Brazil, deceived, and is taken to the brothel. At the end of the year, she recorded the series Suíte Magnólia, on Canal Brasil, by Hamilton Vaz Pereira, playing Nunky, a woman who believes she came from another planet. In 2023, in June, she recorded the film Ainda Estou Aqui, by Walter Salles, based on the memoir of the same name written by Marcelo Rubens Paiva, playing Vera Sílvia Facciolla Paiva, one of the five children of Eunice Paiva, a symbol of the fight against the dictatorship, played by Fernanda Torres. She then began recording the remake of the soap opera Elas por Elas, playing her first villain, the spoiled Cris, Lara's daughter, played by Deborah Secco.

== Personal life ==
Herszage has Jewish ancestry, with her great-grandparents being from Warsaw, Poland.

== Filmography ==
=== Film ===
Year	Title	Role	Notes
2009	Direita É a Mão que Você Escreve	Carolina	Short film
2015	Kill Me Please (Mate-Me Por Favor)	Bia	
2021	Homem Onça	Rosa	
2021	Álbum em Família	Valentina / Heloísa	
2023	The Seven Sorrows of Mary		
2023	Raquel 1:1	Raquel	
2023	O Mensageiro	Vera	
2024	Vidro Fumê	Luana de Freitas	
2024	As Polacas	Rebeca	
2024	I'm Still Here (Ainda Estou Aqui)	Vera Sílvia Facciolla Paiva	
2025	Coisa de Novela	Laura	
2025	A Batalha da Rua Maria Antônia		

=== Television ===
Year	Title	Role	Notes
2017–2018	Pega Pega	Elizabeth Castro Ribeiro "Bebeth"	
2019	Hebe	Young Hebe Camargo	
2021–2022	Quanto Mais Vida, Melhor!	Flávia Santana / Pink	
2023	Fim	Maria Clara	
2023–2024	Elas por Elas	Cristiane "Cris" Furtado Lopes Pompeu	
2024	Suíte Magnólia	Nunky	

=== Music Videos ===
Year	Song	Artist
2017	"Me Adora"	César Lacerda

== Stage ==
Year	Title	Role
2016	Jovem Estudante Procura	Clara
2019–20	Lazarus	Teenage Girl

== Awards and nominations ==
Year	Award	Category	Work nominated	Result
2011	Festival de Cinema de Maringá	Best Leading Actress	Direita é a Mão Que Você Escreve	Won
2015	Festival do Rio	Best Actress	Mate-me Por Favor	Won
2015	Bisatto D’Oro do Festival de Veneza	Best Interpretation	Mate-me Por Favor	Won
2015	Janela Internacional de Cinema do Recife	Special mention for best performance (official jury)	Mate-me Por Favor	Won
2016	Prêmio Guarani de Cinema Brasileiro	Revelation of the Year	Mate-me Por Favor	Won
2017	Prêmio Contigo!	Best New Actress	Pega Pega	Nominated
2017	Prêmio Extra de Televisão	Feminine Revelation	Pega Pega	Nominated
2020	Melhores do Ano Minha Novela	Best Supporting Actress	Hebe	Nominated
2022	North Bend Film Festival	Best Performance	Raquel 1:1	Won
2023	Troféu Que História É Essa, Porchat?	Best Bar Story	"Afogada na Banheira"	Nominated
2024	Festival Sesc Melhores Filmes	Best National Actress	Raquel 1:1	Pending
