= List of accolades received by I'm Still Here (2024 film) =

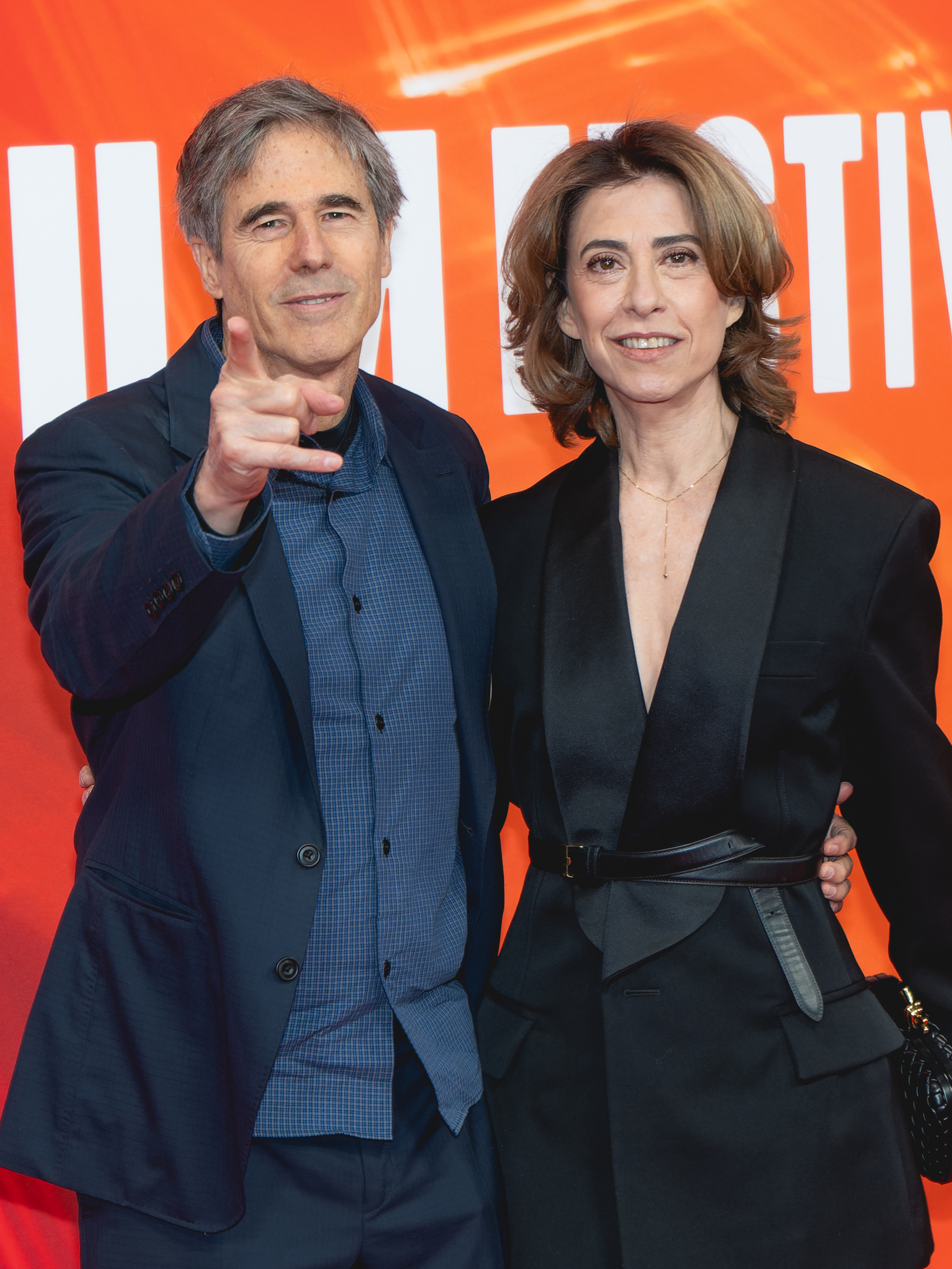
- Walter Salles (left) received accolades for his direction, while Fernanda Torres (right) received for her performance
Accolades
Award	Wins	Nominations
Academy Awards	1	3
Astra Film and Creative Arts Awards	0	1
Austin Film Critics Association	0	1
British Academy Film Awards	0	1
Critics' Choice Movie Awards	0	1
Dorian Awards	1	1
Florida Film Critics Circle	0	1
Golden Globe Awards	1	2
Goya Awards	1	1
Miami Film Festival	1	1
Mill Valley Film Festival	1	1
National Board of Review	1	1
Online Film Critics Society	0	2
Palm Springs International Film Festival	1	1
Prêmio F5	3	3
San Francisco Bay Area Film Critics Circle	0	1
São Paulo Art Critics Association	2	5
São Paulo International Film Festival	1	1
Satellite Awards	1	2
Vancouver International Film Festival	1	1
Venice International Film Festival	3	4
Washington D.C. Area Film Critics Association	0	1

Totals (Note: Certain award groups do not simply award one winner. They acknowledge several different recipients, have runners-up, and have third place. Since this is a specific recognition and is different from losing an award, runner-up mentions are considered wins in this award tally. For simplification and to avoid errors, each award in this list has been presumed to have had a prior nomination.)
- Wins: 55
- Nominations: 73

I'm Still Here (Portuguese: Ainda Estou Aqui) is a 2024 political biographical drama film directed by Walter Salles from a screenplay by Murilo Hauser and Heitor Lorega, based on Marcelo Rubens Paiva's 2015 memoir of the same name. It stars Fernanda Torres and Fernanda Montenegro as Eunice Paiva, a mother and activist coping with the forced disappearance of her husband, the dissident politician Rubens Paiva, during the military dictatorship in Brazil.

The film premiered at the 81st Venice International Film Festival on 1 September 2024, where it won Best Screenplay. It was released in Brazil on 7 November 2024, and in France on 15 January 2025. The film received acclaim from critics, particularly for Torres' performance. On the review aggregator website Rotten Tomatoes, the film holds an approval rating of 97% based on 188 reviews. Metacritic calculated a weighted average score of 85/100 based on 43 reviews, indicating "universal acclaim".

I'm Still Here has received several awards and nominations from critical and industry groups. It received three nominations at the 97th Academy Awards, including Best Picture, becoming the first time a Brazilian film is nominated in the category. At the 82nd Golden Globe Awards, Torres won Best Actress in a Motion Picture – Drama, becoming the first Brazilian actress to win a Golden Globe in an acting category, while the film was nominated for Best Foreign Language Film. It also was nominated for Best Film Not in the English Language at the 78th British Academy Film Awards.

== Accolades ==
Award	Date of ceremony	Category	Recipient(s)	Result	Ref.
Academy Awards	2 March 2025	Best Picture	Maria Carlota Bruno and Rodrigo Teixeira	Nominated	
Academy Awards	2 March 2025	Best Actress	Fernanda Torres	Nominated	
Academy Awards	2 March 2025	Best International Feature	I'm Still Here	Won	
Astra Film Awards	8 December 2024	Best International Feature	Maria Carlota Bruno and Rodrigo Teixeira	Nominated	
27th Women's Image Network Awards	9 November 2025	International Actress - Feature Film	Fernanda Torres	Won	
Troféu AIB de Imprensa	10 December 2025	Best Brazilian Film	I'm Still Here	Won	
Uruguayan Film Critics Association	11 December 2025	Best Latin American Film	I'm Still Here	Won	
Dias de Cine Awards	21 February 2026	Best International Actress	Fernanda Torres	Won	
Austin Film Critics Association	6 January 2025	Best International Film	Maria Carlota Bruno and Rodrigo Teixeira	Nominated	
Brazil Online Film Award	17 February 2025	Best Film	Maria Carlota Bruno and Rodrigo Teixeira	Won	
Brazil Online Film Award	17 February 2025	Direction	Walter Salles	Won	
Brazil Online Film Award	17 February 2025	Best Actress	Fernanda Torres	Won	
Brazil Online Film Award	17 February 2025	Best Supporting Actor	Selton Mello	Nominated	
Brazil Online Film Award	17 February 2025	Best Supporting Actress	Fernanda Montenegro	Runner-up	
Brazil Online Film Award	17 February 2025	Best Ensemble	I'm Still Here	Won	
Brazil Online Film Award	17 February 2025	Best Screenplay	Murilo Hauser and Heitor Lorega	Won	
Brazil Online Film Award	17 February 2025	Best Cinematography	Adrian Teijido	Nominated	
Brazil Online Film Award	17 February 2025	Best Brazilian Film	I'm Still Here	Won	
British Academy Film Awards	16 February 2025	Best Film Not in the English Language	I'm Still Here	Nominated	
Critics Choice Awards Celebration of Cinema & Television	22 October 2024	Actress Award – International Film	Fernanda Torres	Honored	
International Cinephile Society	9 February 2025	Best Actress	Fernanda Torres	Nominated	
International Cinephile Society	9 February 2025	Best Adapted Screenplay	Murilo Hauser and Heitor Lorega	Nominated	
Critics' Choice Awards	7 February 2025	Best Foreign Language Film	I'm Still Here	Nominated	
Dallas–Fort Worth Film Critics Association Awards	18 December 2024	Best Foreign Language Film	I'm Still Here	4th place	
David di Donatello	May 6, 2026	Best International Film	I'm Still Here	Nominated	
Dorian Awards	13 February 2025	Non-English Language Film of the Year	I'm Still Here	Won	
Fidos Award	23 February 2025	Historical Hound Award	Suri Doguinha	Won	
San Sebastián International Film Festival	19 September 2025	FIPRESCI Grand Prix	Walter Salles	Won	
Florida Film Critics Circle	20 December 2024	Best International Film	I'm Still Here	Nominated	
Gold Derby Film Awards	February 11, 2025	Best Film	I'm Still Here	Won	
Gold Derby Film Awards	February 11, 2025	Best International Feature Film	I'm Still Here	Won	
Gold Derby Film Awards	February 11, 2025	Best Actress	Fernanda Torres	Won	
Gold Derby Film Awards	February 11, 2025	Besy Adapted Screenplay	Murilo Hauser; Heitor Lorega	Won	
Golden Globe Awards	5 January 2025	Best Actress in a Motion Picture – Drama	Fernanda Torres	Won	
Golden Globe Awards	5 January 2025	Best Foreign Language Film	I'm Still Here	Nominated	
Goya Awards	8 February 2025	Best Ibero-American Film	I'm Still Here	Won	
IndieWire Critics Poll	16 December 2024	Best Performance	Fernanda Torres	10th place	
International Film Festival Rotterdam	8 February 2025	Audience Award	I'm Still Here	Won	
International Film Critics Society	8 March 2025	Exceeding (One-Inch) Barriers	I'm Still Here	Won	
Latino Entertainment Journalists Association	17 February 2025	Best Picture	I'm Still Here	Nominated	
Latino Entertainment Journalists Association	17 February 2025	Best Director	Walter Salles	Nominated	
Latino Entertainment Journalists Association	17 February 2025	Best Actress	Fernanda Torres	Won	
Latino Entertainment Journalists Association	17 February 2025	Adapted Screenplay	Murilo Hauser, Heitor Lorega and Marcelo Rubens Paiva	Nominated	
Latino Entertainment Journalists Association	17 February 2025	Best Non-English Film	I'm Still Here	Won	
Latino Entertainment Journalists Association	17 February 2025	Best Cinematography	I'm Still Here	Nominated	
Latino Entertainment Journalists Association	17 February 2025	Best Editing	I'm Still Here	Nominated	
London Film Critics' Circle Awards	2 February 2025	Foreign Language Film of the Year	I'm Still Here	Nominated	
Los Angeles Film Critics Association	8 December 2024	Best Lead Performance	Fernanda Torres	Runner-up	
Macondo Awards	2 November 2025	Best Iberoamerican Film	I'm Still Here	Won	
Miami Film Festival	7 November 2024	Audience Award	I'm Still Here	Won	
Mill Valley Film Festival	16 October 2024	Audience Favorite World Cinema	I'm Still Here	Won	
National Board of Review	7 January 2025	Top 5 International Films	I'm Still Here	Won	
New York Film Critics Online	16 December 2024	Best International Feature	I'm Still Here	Runner-up	
Online Film Critics Society	27 January 2025	Best Foreign Language Film	I'm Still Here	Nominated	
Online Film Critics Society	27 January 2025	Best Actress	Fernanda Torres	Nominated	
Palm Springs International Film Festival	12 January 2025	FIPRESCI Prize – Best International Film Feature	I'm Still Here	Won	
Pedro Sienna Awards 2024	3 October 2025	Lihuen Award for Best Ibero-american Film	I'm Still Here	Won	
Pingyao International Film Festival	18 October 2024	Crouching Tiger Hidden Dragon East-West Award	Walter Salles	Honored	
Platino Awards	27 April 2025	Best Ibero-American Film	I'm Still Here	Won	
Platino Awards	27 April 2025	Best Director	Walter Salles	Won	
Platino Awards	27 April 2025	Best Actress	Fernanda Torres	Won	
Premio ABC	17 May 2025	Best Cinematography	Adrian Teijidio	Won	
Premio ABRA	27 May 2025	Best Adapted Screenplay	Murilo Hauser and Heitor Lorega	Won	
Premio ABRA	27 May 2025	Screenwriter of the Year	Murilo Hauser and Heitor Lorega	Won	
Premio Exclamação	1 March 2025	Best Film	I'm Still Here	Won	
Premio Exclamação	1 March 2025	Best Brazilian Film	I'm Still Here	Won	
Premio Exclamação	1 March 2025	Best Poster	I'm Still Here	Won	
Premio Exclamação	1 March 2025	Best Trailer	I'm Still Here	Won	
Premio Exclamação	1 March 2025	Best Ensemble Cast	I'm Still Here	Won	
Premio Exclamação	1 March 2025	Best Character	Eunice Paiva (Fernanda Torres and Fernanda Montenegro)	Won	
Premio Exclamação	1 March 2025	Best Actress	Fernanda Torres	Won	
Premio Exclamação	1 March 2025	Best Supporting Actor	Selton Mello	Won	
Premio Exclamação	1 March 2025	Best Supporting Actress	Fernanda Montenegro	Won	
Premio Exclamação	1 March 2025	Best Director	Walter Salles	Won	
Puerto Rico Film Critics Association Awards	12 January 2025	Best Actress	Fernanda Torres	Runner-up	
Puerto Rico Film Critics Association Awards	12 January 2025	Best International Film	I'm Still Here	Won	
Prêmio F5	19 December 2024	Performance of the Year – Film	Fernanda Torres	Won	
Prêmio F5	19 December 2024	Best Film	I'm Still Here	Won	
Prêmio F5	19 December 2024	Performance of the Year – Children's Role	Cora Mora	Won	
Premio O Globo: Faz Diferença	10 May 2025	Personality of the Year	Fernanda Torres	Won	
Premio O Globo: Faz Diferença	10 May 2025	Personality of the Year	Walter Salles	Won	
Premio O Globo: Faz Diferença	10 May 2025	Cinema	Selton Mello	Won	
Premios Soto	21 October 2025	Best Ibero-american Feature Film	I'm Still Here	Won	
Robert Awards	31 January 2026	Best Non-English Language Film	Walter Salles	Won	
San Francisco Bay Area Film Critics Circle	15 December 2024	Best International Feature Film	I'm Still Here	Nominated	
Santa Barbara International Film Festival	9 February 2025	Virtuoso Award	Fernanda Torres	Honored	
São Paulo Art Critics Association (APCA)	20 January 2025	Best Picture	I'm Still Here	Won	
São Paulo Art Critics Association (APCA)	20 January 2025	Best Director	Walter Salles	Nominated	
São Paulo Art Critics Association (APCA)	20 January 2025	Best Actress	Fernanda Torres	Won	
São Paulo Art Critics Association (APCA)	20 January 2025	Best Actor	Selton Mello	Nominated	
São Paulo Art Critics Association (APCA)	20 January 2025	Best Screenplay	Murilo Hauser and Hector Lorega	Nominated	
São Paulo International Film Festival	30 October 2024	Audience Award – Best Brazilian Fiction	I'm Still Here	Won	
Satellite Awards	26 January 2025	Best Actress in a Motion Picture – Drama	Fernanda Torres	Won	
Satellite Awards	26 January 2025	Best Motion Picture – International	I'm Still Here	Nominated	
Séries em Cena Awards	3 August 2025	Film of the Year	I'm Still Here	Won	
Séries em Cena Awards	3 August 2025	National Film of the Year	I'm Still Here	Won	
Séries em Cena Awards	3 August 2025	Favorite Film of the Year	I'm Still Here	Won	
Séries em Cena Awards	3 August 2025	Best Performance in a National Film	Fernanda Torres	Won	
Soto Awards	21 October 2025	Best Ibero-American Film	I'm Still Here	Won	
Sur Awards	23 July 2025	Best Ibero-American Film	I'm Still Here	Won	
Vancouver International Film Festival	11 October 2024	Gala & Special Presentations Audience Award	I'm Still Here	Won	
Veja Rio – Carioca do Ano	16 December 2024	Cinema	Fernanda Torres	Honored	
Venice International Film Festival	7 September 2024	Golden Lion	Walter Salles	Nominated	
Venice International Film Festival	7 September 2024	Best Screenplay	Murilo Hauser and Heitor Lorega	Won	
Venice International Film Festival	7 September 2024	Green Drop Award	Walter Salles	Won	
Venice International Film Festival	7 September 2024	SIGNIS Award	Walter Salles	Won	
Washington D.C. Area Film Critics Association	8 December 2024	Best Foreign Language Film	I'm Still Here	Nominated	
