= Kill Me Please =

Kill Me Please may refer to:

- Kill Me Please (2010 film), a French-Belgian comedy film
- Kill Me Please (2015 film), a teen thriller drama film
