= Paulo Vieira =

Brazilian comedian

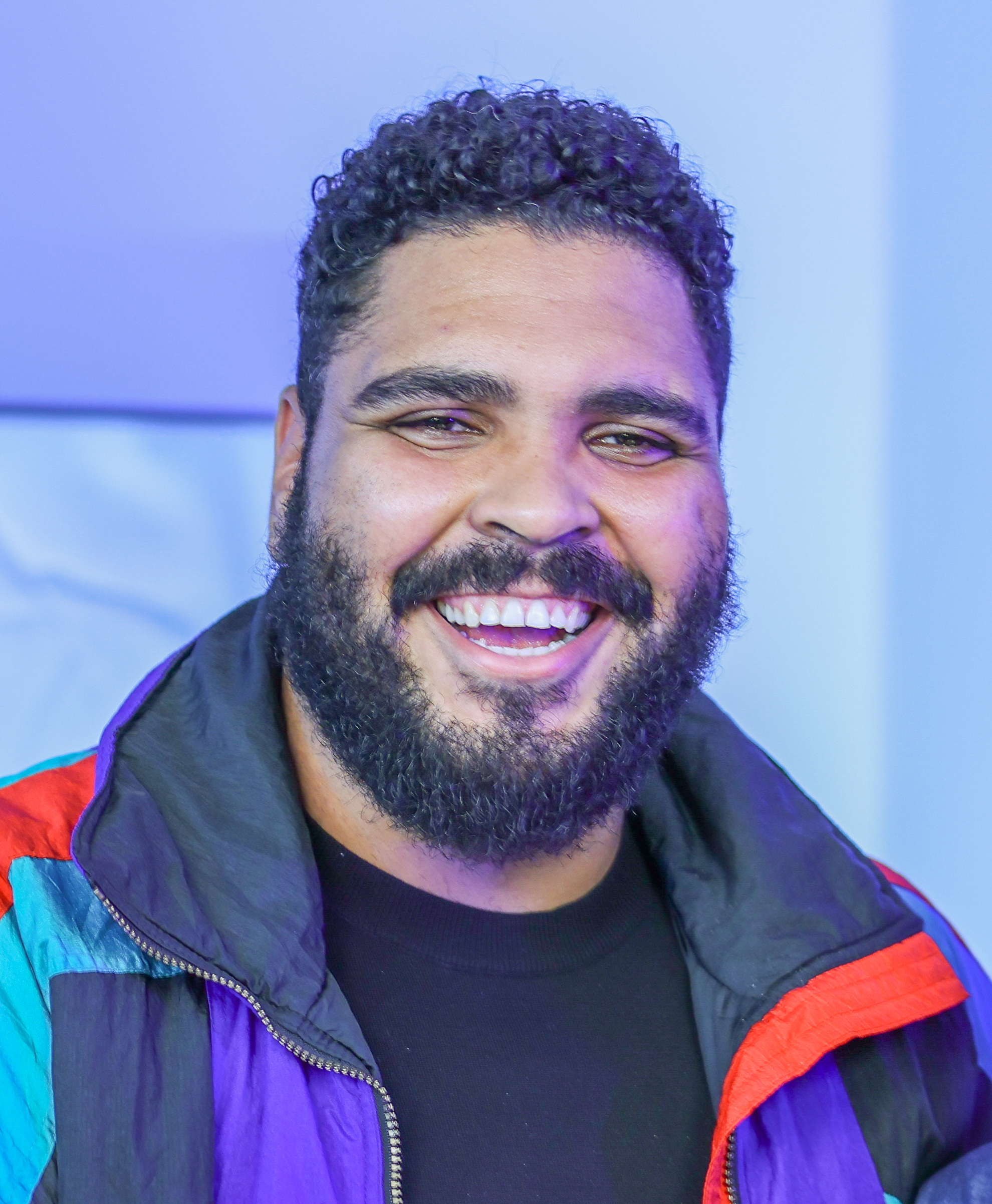
- Paulo Vieira in 2022
- Born: Paulo Vieira da Silva; November 10, 1992 (age 33); Trindade, Goiás, Brazil
- Occupations: Comedian; Actor; Television presenter; Screenwriter
- Years active: 2010–present

Paulo Vieira da Silva (November 10, 1992) is a Brazilian comedian, actor, and TV presenter.

== Biography ==
=== Early years ===
Paulo Vieira was born in Trindade, Goiás, but moved with his family to Palmas, the capital of Tocantins, when he was still a child, and since then has considered himself a native of Tocantins.

He began working at the age of 12 as a street vendor, taking responsibility for the family's income. Since childhood, he has participated in children's theater in Palmas, studying for a career in the performing arts. At the age of 12, he performed his first professional play in Palmas.

=== Career ===
In 2010, the comedian was invited to perform with members of the Rio de Janeiro comedy group Comédia em Pé in Palmas. After the show, Paulo continued doing stand-up comedy and, together with friends, created the first comedy group in Tocantins, called Tô na Comédia.

He began to stand out and won national comedy awards, including the Prêmio Multishow de Humor in 2013, the Quem Chega Lá segment on the Domingão do Faustão program, and the Risadaria de Humor Brasileiro award, both in 2015. Also in 2015, he debuted in the play Torrenegra, alongside actors Kaká Nogueira and Thiago Omena, produced by Companhia Cenaberta de Teatro, directed by Ana Isabel Friedlander and written by Wilson Fumoy. The play toured nationally until 2017, with performances in Palmas, Goiânia, and Belo Horizonte, among other places.

In 2016, he was invited to participate in Programa do Porchat, hosted by comedian and presenter Fábio Porchat on RecordTV. On the talk show, the comedian acted as the presenter's sidekick. Also on the program, he was the lead actor in the segment Emergente Como a Gente (Emerging Like Us), which humorously portrayed the lives of people with limited financial means. In 2017, he released his first EP, entitled Circo das Pulgas, with four tracks composed by him. The project was produced by Gustavo Ruiz and the cover was designed by singer Tulipa Ruiz.

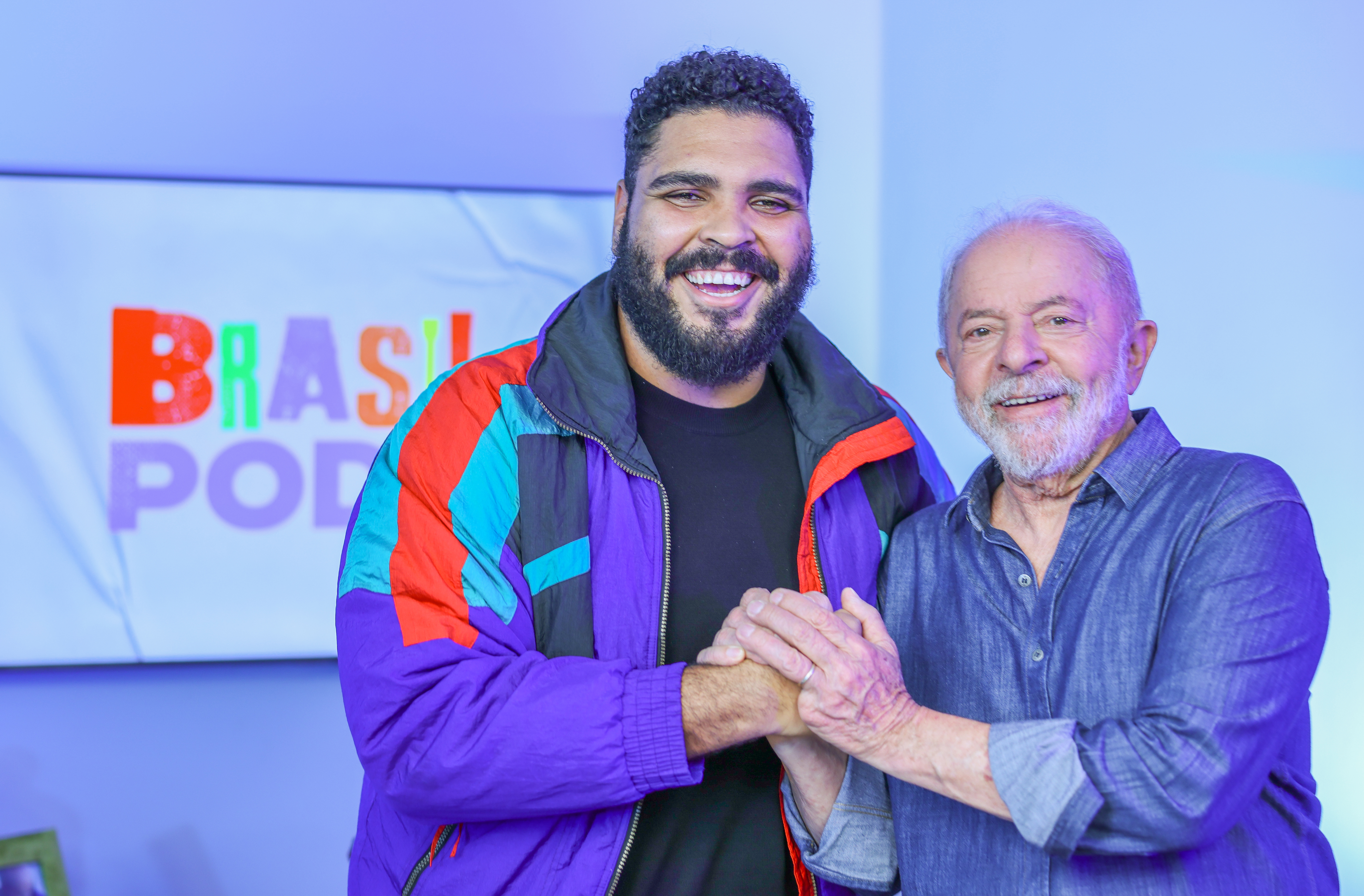
Paulo Vieira, and Luiz Inácio Lula da Silva in 2022.

In 2018, the comedian took advantage of his success on Programa do Porchat to launch a long-held dream: the tourism company Viva Jalapão, which combines tourism in Jalapão State Park, a tourist region in Tocantins, with social action to benefit the local community. It was also at this time that Paulo presented the theatrical show Juntei Tudo Para Te Contar, which dealt with his childhood in the interior of Tocantins and his life as an amateur actor.

With the end of the Programa do Porchat in 2018, Paulo was hired by TV Globo in early 2019. Initially, the invitation was to join the cast of the comedy show Zorra. In October of the same year, Paulo debuted in the fifth season of Escolinha do Professor Raimundo, playing the character Seu Fininho, who in the first version of the show was played by actor André Mattos in the 1990s. In the same year, he directed the theatrical thriller O Antiquário Frankl, written by Wilson Fumiy and also produced by Companhia Cenaberta de Teatro. In September 2019, the segment Isso é Muito Minha Vida debuted on the show Se Joga. He participated in the medium-length film The Last Hangover, produced by Porta dos Fundos and Netflix. The special won the 2019 International Emmy Award in the Best Comedy category.

In 2020, he made his debut as host of the comedy show Fora de Hora, alongside actress Renata Gaspar. The program is inspired by a television news program and satirizes daily news stories. Due to the COVID-19 pandemic in Brazil, recordings were suspended and the program began to be produced in podcast format. While social distancing measures were still in place due to the pandemic, the comedian debuted the segment Como Lidar? on Fantástico. In July of the same year, he debuted alongside comedian Fernando Caruso on the show Cada Um no Seu Quadrado on the Globoplay streaming platform.

In October 2021, he debuted on the GNT channel as host of Rolling Kitchen Brasil, a cooking game show in which two couples compete in the challenge of preparing a dish. In 2022, he won a comedy segment on the twenty-second season of the reality show Big Brother Brasil, called Big Therapy, which aired every Wednesday. That same year, he debuted the program Avisa Lá Que Eu Vou on the GNT channel, in which he visited small towns in search of interesting and funny stories. On Sundays, the program was aired as a segment on Fantástico.

In July, during the 26th São Paulo International Book Biennial, he launched his first children's book, entitled O Dia Que a Árvore do Meu Quintal Falou Comigo. The work is narrated in the first person and shows a child's perspective as he talks to the tree in his backyard, which wants to see the world and move to the Baltic Sea.

In 2025, he was the creator and screenwriter of the series Pablo & Luisão, broadcast by Globoplay, which follows the adventures of Luisão, played by Aílton Graça, father of comedian Paulo Vieira, and his inseparable friend Pablo, played by Otávio Müller.

== Personal life ==
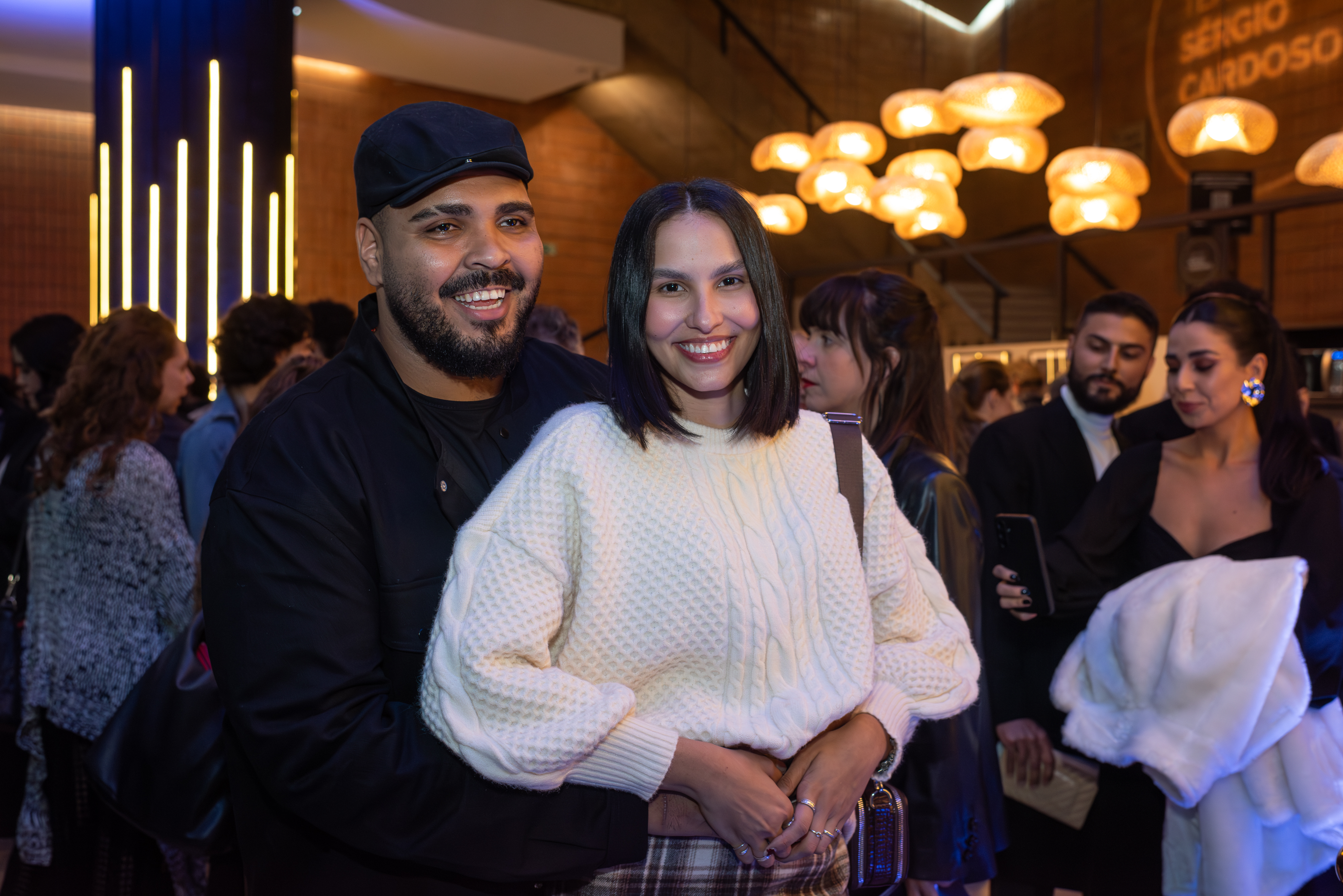
Paulo Vieira and Illana Sales.

He is a follower of Candomblé. In 2022, during the Brazilian presidential elections, he declared his support for Luiz Inácio Lula da Silva (PT).

He has been dating fellow actress Ilana Salles for seven years.

== Filmography ==
=== TV ===
Year	Title	Role	Notes
2015	Quem Chega Lá?	Contestant (winner)	Domingão do Faustão – Season 4
2016–18	Programa do Porchat	Stage assistant / Reporter	
2019–20	Se Joga	Various characters	Segment: "Isso é Muito Minha Vida"
2019–20	Zorra	Various characters	
2019	Escolinha do Professor Raimundo	Seu Fininho	
2020–present	Fantástico	Reporter	
2020–21	Cada Um no Seu Quadrado (Globoplay)	Host	
2021–22	Rolling Kitchen Brasil (GNT)	Host	
2022–present	Avisa Lá Que Eu Vou	Host	Also artistic director (since Season 4)
2022–23	Big Brother Brasil	Commentator	Segment: "Big Terapia"
2022	Novelei	Victor Marques (Vitinho)	
2024	The Masked Singer Brasil	Judge	Special participation
2024–present	Vem que Tem	Host	
2025	Video Show: Especial	Reporter	
2025	Pablo & Luisão	Narrator / Himself	Also creator and screenwriter
2025	Garota do Momento	Mirosmar Piratininga	Episodes: "25–26 June"

=== Film ===
Year	Title	Role
2019	The Last Hangover	Pedro
2022	O Palestrante	George
2022	Dissonantes	Paulo Santos
2023	Fervo	Jonas Camargo

=== Theater ===
Year	Title	Character	Notes	Ref.
2010–15	Grupo Comédia em Pé	Stand-up comedy		
2010–15	Tô na Comédia	Stand-up comedy		
2015	Torrenegra	Baltazar / Meirinho / Prof. Rapaport Milller		
2018	Juntei Tudo Para Te Contar	Stand-up comedy		
2019	O Antiquário Frankl		Director	

== Other workers ==
=== Books ===
- 2022 – O Dia Que a Árvore do Meu Quintal Falou Comigo – (Rio de Janeiro: HarperKids).

== Awards and nominations ==
Year	Award	Category	Work/Recipient	Result	Ref.
2013	Prêmio Multishow de Humor	Best Comedian	Paulo Vieira	Won	
2015	Grande Prêmio Risadaria de Humor	Highlight of the Year	Paulo Vieira	Won	
2019	Troféu UOL TV e Famosos	Best Comedian (critical vote)	Paulo Vieira	Won	
2020	Prêmio F5	Best Actor in a Comedy Series/Program	Fora de Hora	Nominated	
2020	Prêmio Men of the Year Brasil	Humor	Paulo Vieira	Won	
2020	Splash Awards	Best Comedian	Paulo Vieira	Nominated	
2020	Prêmio APCA	Humor	Paulo Vieira	Nominated	
2021	Splash Awards	Best Twitter Profile	Paulo Vieira	Nominated	
2022	SEC Awards	Featured on Social Media	Paulo Vieira	Nominated	
2022	MTV Millennial Awards	Laugh Out Loud	Big Brother Brasil 22; Quadro Big Terapia	Nominated	
2022	Prêmio Potências	Comedian of the Year	Big Brother Brasil 22; Quadro Big Terapia	Won	
2022	Melhores do Ano	Humor: Troféu Paulo Gustavo	Big Brother Brasil 22; Quadro Big Terapia	Nominated	
2022	Prêmio Faz Diferença – O Globo	TV Highlight	Big Brother Brasil 22/ GNT/Fantástico	Nominated	
2023	SEC Awards	Best Performance in a Domestic Film	Fervo	Nominated	
2023	SEC Awards	TV Highlight	Big Brother Brasil 23; Quadro Big Terapia	Nominated	
2023	Splash Awards	Best Comedian	Big Brother Brasil 23; Quadro Big Terapia	Won	
2023	Melhores do Ano	Humor	Big Brother Brasil 23; Quadro Big Terapia	Won	
2024	Melhores do Ano	Humor	Avisa Lá Que Eu Vou	Won	
2024	Troféu Internet	Best Comedian	Avisa Lá Que Eu Vou	Nominated	
2024	Troféu Imprensa	Best Comedian	Avisa Lá Que Eu Vou	Nominated	
