= I'm Still Here (2024 film) =

2024 film by Walter Salles

- Brazilian theatrical release poster
- Portuguese: Ainda Estou Aqui
- Directed by: Walter Salles
- Screenplay by: Murilo Hauser; Heitor Lorega
- Based on: I'm Still Here by Marcelo Rubens Paiva
- Produced by: Maria Carlota Bruno; Rodrigo Teixeira; Martine de Clermont-Tonnerre
- Starring: Fernanda Torres; Selton Mello; Fernanda Montenegro; Valentina Herszage; Guilherme Silveira; Luiza Kosovski; Barbara Luz
- Cinematography: Adrian Teijido
- Edited by: Affonso Gonçalves
- Music by: Warren Ellis
- Production companies: VideoFilmes; RT Features; MACT Productions; Arte France Cinéma; Conspiração; Globoplay
- Distributed by: Sony Pictures Releasing International (Brazil); StudioCanal (France)
- Release dates: 1 September 2024 (Venice); 7 November 2024 (Brazil); 15 January 2025 (France)
- Running time: 138 minutes
- Countries: Brazil; France
- Language: Portuguese
- Budget: $9 million
- Box office: $36.4 million

I'm Still Here (Portuguese: Ainda Estou Aqui ; Brazilian Portuguese: [aˈĩdɐ isˈtow aˈki]) is a 2024 political biographical drama film directed by Walter Salles from a screenplay by Murilo Hauser and Heitor Lorega, based on Marcelo Rubens Paiva's 2015 memoir of the same name. It stars Fernanda Torres and Fernanda Montenegro as Eunice Paiva, a mother and activist coping with the forced disappearance of her husband, the dissident politician Rubens Paiva (Selton Mello), during the military dictatorship in Brazil.

The film had its world premiere at the 81st Venice International Film Festival on 1 September 2024, where it won the Best Screenplay award and received critical acclaim with widespread praise for Torres' performance. It was named one of the Top 5 International Films of 2024 by the National Board of Review. At the 82nd Golden Globe Awards, Torres won the Best Actress in a Motion Picture – Drama award while the film was nominated for Best Foreign Language Film, a category in which it was also nominated at the Critics' Choice Movie Awards and the BAFTA. At the 97th Academy Awards, the film was nominated for Best Picture and Best Actress (Torres), and won Best International Feature Film, becoming the first-ever Brazilian-produced film to win an Academy Award.

Soon after its release in Brazilian theaters on 7 November 2024 by Sony Pictures Releasing International, the film was the target of an unsuccessful boycott by the Brazilian far-right, which denies that the military regime was a dictatorship. Grossing $36 million with a budget of around $9M, it became the highest-grossing Brazilian film since the COVID-19 pandemic.

== Plot ==
In December 1970, former Brazilian congressman Rubens Paiva lives in a house near Leblon beach in Rio de Janeiro with his wife Eunice and their five children. Returning to his civil career, after the revocation of his tenure as a congressman following the 1964 Brazilian coup d'état, Paiva continues to support political expatriates without disclosing his activities to his family.

After revolutionary movements kidnap the Swiss ambassador to Brazil, the country faces looming political instability. The Paivas' friends Fernando and Dalva Gasparian decide to seek refuge in London, taking the Paivas' eldest daughter, Vera, with them. Vera had previously witnessed military violence while returning from the cinema with her friends. Paiva's house is raided by the military and he is arrested and disappears in January 1971. Eunice's public inquiries about his whereabouts result in her arrest and torture for 12 days, during which she is questioned about her husband's involvement in pro-democracy movements, which she denies. Eliana, their teenage daughter, is also imprisoned but soon released.

Newspaper reports claim that Rubens fled the country into exile, but Eunice and her friends suspect otherwise. With the help of lawyer Lino Machado, she files a habeas corpus petition. She also learns from family friend Bocaiuva Cunha that Rubens had been secretly helping political exiles. A former teacher, Martha, confirms she was imprisoned with Rubens but is afraid to speak out publicly. She later writes a letter detailing her arrest. Félix, a journalist and family friend, informs Eunice that Rubens was killed, but the military authorities refuse to confirm it. Left to care for her children alone, Eunice sells their home and moves to São Paulo, anticipating a new start close to her maternal family.

Twenty five years later, in 1996, surrounded by journalists while receiving Rubens Paiva's official death certificate from the Brazilian state, now once again a democracy, Eunice calls for reparations for victims' families and accountability for the military dictatorship's crimes.

In 2014, during a family gathering surrounded by her children and grandchildren, the now 85-year-old Eunice lives with advanced Alzheimer's disease. When a news report about the National Truth Commission addresses Rubens's case, a distressed Eunice appears to remember him.

An epilogue reveals that five men were identified as responsible for the murder of Paiva, who was killed at the DOI-CODI headquarters between January 21 and 22, 1971, but none were prosecuted. The epilogue also notes that Eunice graduated from law school at 48 and became one of the few experts on indigenous rights in Brazil, serving as a counselor for the federal government, the World Bank, and the United Nations. She died in 2018 at the age of 89.

== Cast ==
- Fernanda Torres as Eunice Paiva
  - Fernanda Montenegro as Eunice Paiva (older)
- Selton Mello as Rubens Paiva
- Guilherme Silveira as Marcelo Rubens Paiva
  - Antonio Saboia as Marcelo Rubens Paiva (adult)
- Valentina Herszage as Vera Paiva
  - Maria Manoella as Vera Paiva (older)
- Luiza Kosovski as Eliana Paiva
  - Marjorie Estiano as Eliana Paiva (older)
- Barbara Luz as Nalu Paiva
  - Gabriela Carneiro da Cunha as Nalu Paiva (older)
- Cora Mora as Maria Beatriz Facciolla Paiva
  - Olívia Torres as Maria Beatriz Facciolla Paiva (adult)
- Pri Helena as Maria José (Zezé)
- Humberto Carrão as Félix
- Maeve Jinkings as Dalva Gasparian
- Caio Horowicz as Ricardo Gomes Pimpão
- Camila Márdila as Dalal Achcar
- Charles Fricks as Fernando Gasparian
- Luana Nastas as Helena Gasparian
- Isadora Ruppert as Laura Gasparian
- Daniel Dantas as Raul Ryff
- Maitê Padilha as Cristina
- Carla Ribas as Martha
- Dan Stulbach as Bocaiuva Cunha
- Helena Albergaria as Beatriz Bandeira

== Production ==
=== Development ===
The screenplay is by Murilo Hauser and Heitor Lorega. It is adapted from the memoir Ainda Estou Aqui by Marcelo Rubens Paiva, Eunice's son.

The Brazilian-French co-production was produced by RT Features and VideoFilmes in collaboration with Globoplay, Mact Productions, Conspiração Filmes and Arte France Cinéma.

=== Filming ===
Principal photography began during May and June 2023 on location in Rio de Janeiro, during November and December filming took place in Sāo Paulo, shooting for 16 weeks in total. Cinematographer Adrian Teijido shot the production on 35mm, aiming to recreate the Brazilian 1970's mood, selected scenes were also shot in Super 8mm.

== Release ==
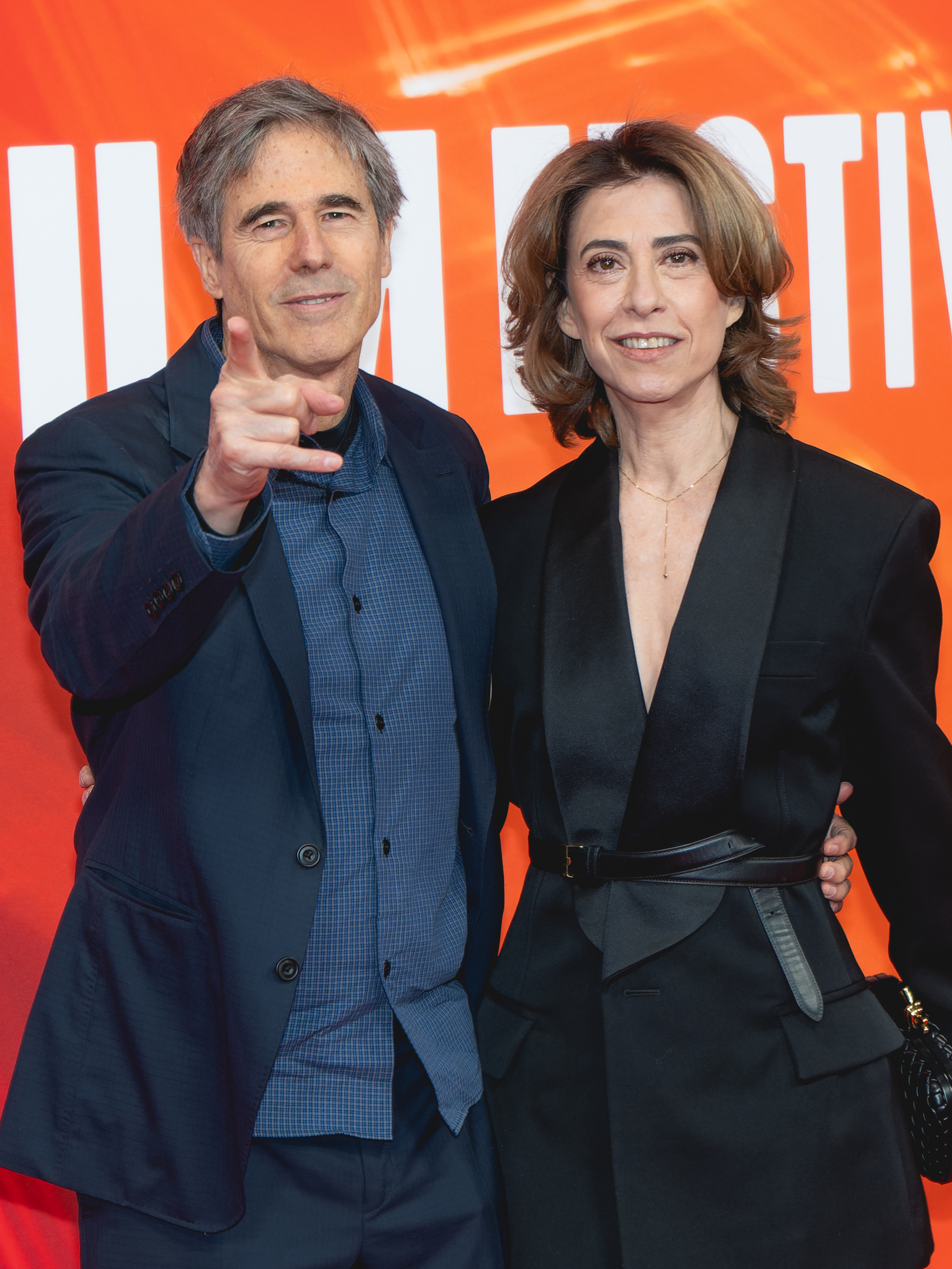
Director Walter Salles and lead actress Fernanda Torres promoting I'm Still Here at the 2024 BFI London Film Festival

In May 2024, Sony Pictures Classics acquired distribution rights to I'm Still Here in North America, the Middle East, Eastern Europe, Turkey, Portugal, Australia, and New Zealand at the Marché du Film.

The film had its world premiere at the 81st Venice International Film Festival on 1 September 2024, receiving a standing ovation of over 10 minutes; it was in competition for the Golden Lion and won the Best Screenplay prize. In September and October it screened at various festivals, including Toronto, New York, and London. It had its Asian premiere at China's Pingyao International Film Festival, where Salles was honored with the Crouching Tiger Hidden Dragon East-West Award. It was screened in the Limelight section of the 54th International Film Festival Rotterdam in February 2025.

To qualify for the Best International Feature Film category at the 97th Academy Awards, the film was given a limited theatrical run in the Brazilian city of Salvador from 19 to 25 September 2024, followed by a nationwide release on 7 November 2024 by Sony Pictures Releasing. I'm Still Here was released in France on 15 January 2025 by StudioCanal. In the United States, the film received a one-week awards-qualifying run in November 2024 and a limited theatrical release in New York City and Los Angeles on 17 January 2025, before expanding to more cities on 14 February.

The film was released on premium video on demand (PVOD) in the United States on 11 March 2025, and on the Brazilian streaming service Globoplay on 6 April 2025. It was released on Blu-ray in the United Kingdom on 23 June 2025 by Altitude Film Distribution.

== Reception ==
=== Box office ===
On its opening day in Brazil, I'm Still Here brought 50,320 people to the cinemas, grossing R$1.1 million. In its first weekend, even though it was the target of a frustrated boycott by the Brazilian far right, the film debuted in first place at the box office with 358,000 admissions, earning R$8.6 million, surpassing the third week of Venom: The Last Dance (R$6.6 million) and fellow new release Red One (R$5.3 million).

It was released in Portugal on January 16, 2025, where it quickly became popular, surpassing 100,000 spectators within two weeks, according to the Portuguese newspaper Público.

By February 2025, the film had surpassed 5 million admissions in Brazil, becoming the highest-grossing Brazilian film since the COVID-19 pandemic, grossing $25 million during its national theatrical release.

Alongside international markets, the film grossed a total of $36 million.

=== Critical response ===
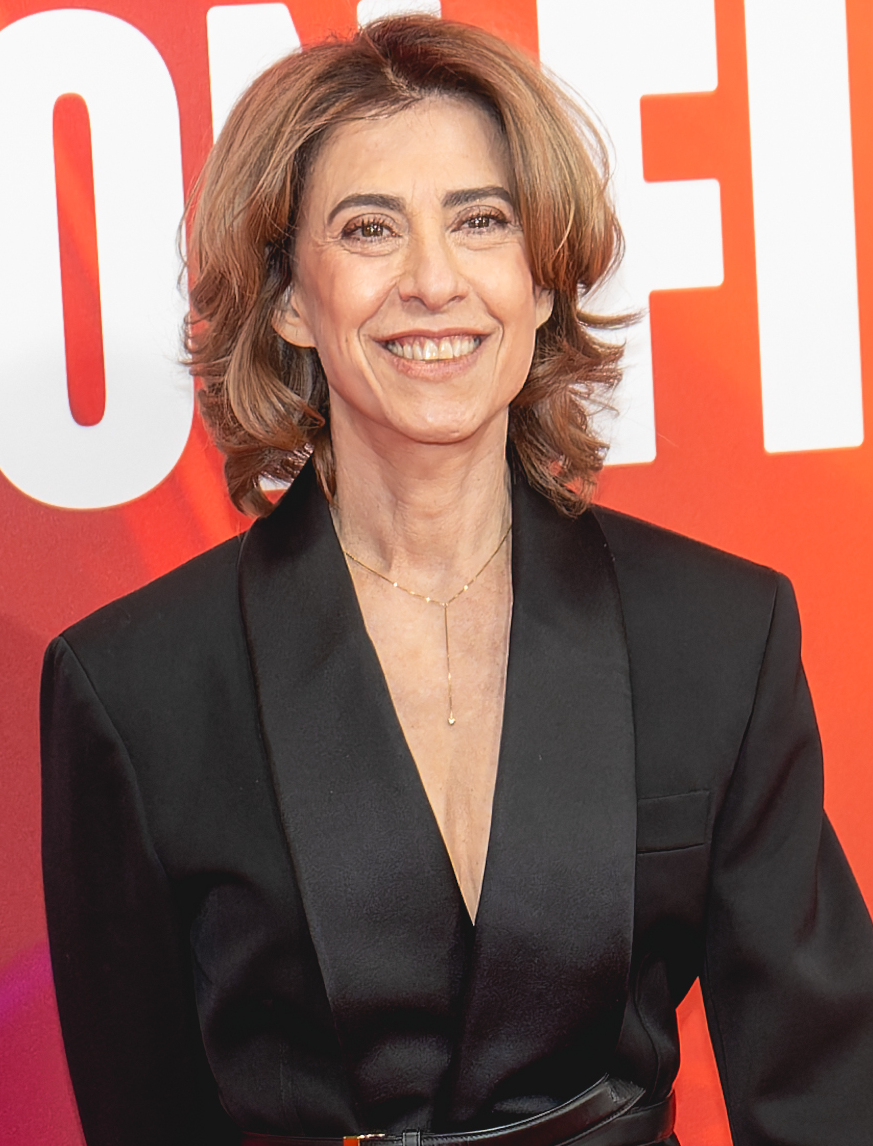
Fernanda Torres garnered widespread critical acclaim for her performance and earned an Academy Award nomination for Best Actress.

Upon its release, I'm Still Here received overwhelming praise from the public, film critics, and the press; Torres's performance was particularly acclaimed. On the review aggregator website Rotten Tomatoes, 97% of 205 critics' reviews are positive, with an average rating of 8.2/10. The website's consensus reads: "Carried along by Fernanda Torres' superb performance, I'm Still Here poignantly explores a nation's upheaval through one family's search for answers." Metacritic, which uses a weighted average, assigned the film a score of 85 out of 100, based on 43 critics, indicating "universal acclaim".

Jessica Kiang of Variety praised the film and its dramatic charge: "Classical in form but radical in empathy, I'm Still Here arguably does not need the follow-up sections—one set in 1996 and the other in 2014—that somewhat alter the emotional rhythm. But on the other hand, these characters are so vivid that we don't want to leave them either". For Wendy Ide of Screen Daily, Salles "never over-labours the film's emotional beats, relying instead on Torres' magnificent, intricately layered performance to drive the picture"; she also praised Montenegro, "who has a brief but exceptionally powerful cameo here as the elderly Eunice".

Several international outlets applauded Torres's performance, with Collider considering it one of the best of the year and "more than deserving of an Oscar nomination". In her review for Deadline, Stephanie Bunbury calls the film a "celebration of Brazil" and praises Torres, writing that she "has an emotional delicacy as Eunice that conveys, through the smallest and subtlest signals, what it costs her to hold back her anxiety and anger for the sake of her family. It is a performance that should catapult her into the awards race, 25 years after her mother Fernanda Montenegro was Oscar-nominated for Salles' breakthrough feature, Central Station". David Rooney in The Hollywood Reporter highlighted the relationship between Montenegro and Torres, writing, "What makes the connection even more poignant is that she appears as the elderly, infirm version of the protagonist". He called I'm Still Here "a gripping, profoundly touching film with a deep well of pathos. It's one of Salles' best". For IndieWire, Leila Latif called Torres's performance "as spectacular as her filmography would suggest, having marked herself out as one of the South American continent's greatest actors in roles in Foreign Land (also directed by Salles) and won a Best Actress Award in Love Me Forever or Never. Her Eunice possesses phenomenal strength and stoicism which make each moment of pain that peep through the chinks of her armor all the more moving". Latif also praised Torres's on-screen interaction with Selton Mello.

Filmmaker Alfonso Cuarón named it one of his favorite films of 2024, saying, "Watching a Walter Salles film is to be embraced in generosity, is like experiencing a gravitational pull, both lifting and grounding us at the same time with an invisible yet undeniable force. With I'm Still Here, this effect is even more compelling. Many other filmmakers, including Nicole Holofcener and Chad Hartigan, also cited it as among their favorite films of 2024.

In 2025, Collider ranked it third on its list of the "10 Essential Movies of the 2020s So Far", with Eddie Possehl writing, "With the disease of misinformation and government corruption spreading across the real world, the story told within I'm Still Here is a vital watch for people of every age as society continues to evolve and degrade at the same time."

I'm Still Here was named one of the Top 5 International Films of 2024 by the National Board of Review and one of 50 Best Films of the year by British film magazine Sight & Sound. In July 2025, it ranked 253rd in the "Readers' Choice" edition of The New York Times's list of "The 100 Best Movies of the 21st Century".

=== Accolades ===
The film received several awards and nominations. At the 82nd Golden Globe Awards, the film received two nominations: Best Foreign Language Film and Best Actress in a Motion Picture – Drama for Torres. Torres won in her category, becoming the first Brazilian actress to win a Golden Globe in an acting category. The film was also nominated for Best Film Not in the English Language at the 78th British Academy Film Awards.

At the 97th Academy Awards, the film received three nominations, including Best Picture, becoming the first time a Brazilian film was nominated in the category. It won the award for Best International Feature Film (the first Brazilian film to win after four nominations). Emilia Pérez was considered a front-runner, but controversies around Karla Sofía Gascón and an attempt to smear I'm Still Here's campaign led most pundits to agree it ceased France's chances to win the category after more than thirty years.

On 17 February 2025, the film received Cinema for Peace Dove for the Most Valuable Film of the Year. Shortly after, at the 12th Platino Awards held in Madrid on 27 April 2025, it won Best Ibero-American Fiction Film, Best Director for Walter Salles, and Best Actress for Fernanda Torres.

=== Cultural impact ===
Brazilians widely embraced I'm Still Here, as its release coincided with the celebrations marking 40 years since the restoration of democracy in Brazil, and because country still pays reparations for the regime's victims families, following an amnesty approved during the Military dictatorship that prevented accountability for crimes committed by the regime officials.

The film's success resonated during the 2025 Brazilian Carnival season: Torres was a prominent figure in the festivities. Shops reported a surge in demand for costumes inspired by her Golden Globes outfit, and stores along the Rua 25 de Março" in São Paulo were filled with Oscar statue props and costumes.

== See also ==
- Ainda Estou Aqui
- List of submissions to the 97th Academy Awards for Best International Feature Film
- List of Brazilian submissions for the Academy Award for Best International Feature Film
