= Past Minutes =

2013 film directed by Caio Sóh

- Directed by: Caio Sóh
- Screenplay by: Caio Sóh
- Produced by: Luana Lobo
- Starring: Vladimir Brichta; Paulo Moska; Otávio Muller
- Cinematography: Rodrigo Alayete
- Edited by: Bruno Regis
- Production companies: Sinceramente Cinicos; Maria Farinha Filmes
- Distributed by: H2O Films
- Release date: October 8, 2013 (Festival do Rio)
- Running time: 100 minutes
- Country: Brazil
- Language: Portuguese

Past Minutes (Portuguese: Minutos Atrás) is a 2013 Brazilian comedy-fantasy film directed and written by Caio Sóh.

== Plot ==
Nildo (Otávio Muller) and Alonso (Vladimir Brichta) are two waste pickers, whose lonely souls wander through life behind remains of dreams and fears played out in search of a reason for their lives. Along with the Ruminant horse (Paulo Moska), their companion, the two share fantastic and surreal stories that sometimes borders on insanity. They walk towards the construction of a new destination to its existence, distressed by the passage of time.

== Cast ==
- Vladimir Brichta as Alonso
- Paulo Moska as Ruminant
- Otávio Muller as Nildo
