= Kissing Game (TV series) =

Brazilian television series

- Portuguese: Boca a Boca
- Genre: Thriller drama
- Created by: Esmir Filho
- Screenplay by: Esmir Filho; Juliana Rojas; Marcelo Marchi; Jaqueline Souza; Thais Guisasola
- Directed by: Esmir Filho; Juliana Rojas
- Starring: Caio Horowicz; Denise Fraga; Esther Tinman; Bianca Byington; Carolina del Carmen Peleritti; Iza Moreira; Thomás Aquino
- Country of origin: Brazil
- Original language: Portuguese
- No. of seasons: 1
- No. of episodes: 6

Production
- Producers: Fernando Sapelli; Thereza Menezes; Caio Gullane; Fabiano Gullane
- Production companies: Gullane; Fetiche Features

Original release
- Network: Netflix
- Release: 17 July 2020

Kissing Game (Portuguese: Boca a Boca) is a Brazilian thriller drama television series created by Esmir Filho for Netflix.

== Plot ==
After a party, a girl wakes up the next day with a slightly different hangover. She was infected with a virus transmitted through her mouth. In addition to the common dramas from the coming of age, teenagers in a rural town live with the panic of the virus and the fear that their secrets will be discovered.

== Cast ==
=== Main ===
Actor/Actress	Role
Caio Horowicz	Alex Nero
Iza Moreira	Fran
Michel Joelsas	Francisco "Chico"
Denise Fraga	Guiomar Araújo
Thomás Aquino	Maurílio
Luana Nastas	Isabel "Bel" Lima Alves
Luana Camaleão	Marina
Olívia de Sá	Nanda
Esther Tinman	Manuela "Manu" Araújo
Kevin Vechiatto	Quim
Grace Passô	Dalva
Bianca Byington	Carminha Nero
Bruno Garcia	Doni Nero
Flávio Tolezani	Tomás
Júlia Feldens	Theresa Lima Alves
Bella Camero	Bianca Nero
Augusto Trainotti	Guilherme

== Episodes ==
No.	Title	Directed by	Written by	Original release date
1	"Got You!" "Te Peguei!"	Esmir Filho	Esmir Filho & Thais Guisasola	July 17, 2020
2	"Friday Night-Monday Morning" "Sextou/Segundou"	Esmir Filho	Esmir Filho & Juliana Soares	July 17, 2020
3	"Easy When That Doesn't Affect You" "É Facil Quando Não Te Afeta"	Esmir Filho	Esmir Filho & Marcelo Marchi	July 17, 2020
4	"Are You Looking?" "A Fim de Real?"	Esmir Filho	Esmir Filho & Thais Guisasola	July 17, 2020
5	"Unfollow" "Unfollow"	Juliana Rojas	Esmir Filho & Juliana Soares	July 17, 2020
6	"We Are All Sick" "Estamos Todos Doentes"	Juliana Rojas	Esmir Filho & Marcelo Marchi	July 17, 2020

== Release ==
On June 23, 2020, Netflix released the official trailer for the series.
