= Anita Rocha da Silveira =

Brazilian film director and screenwriter

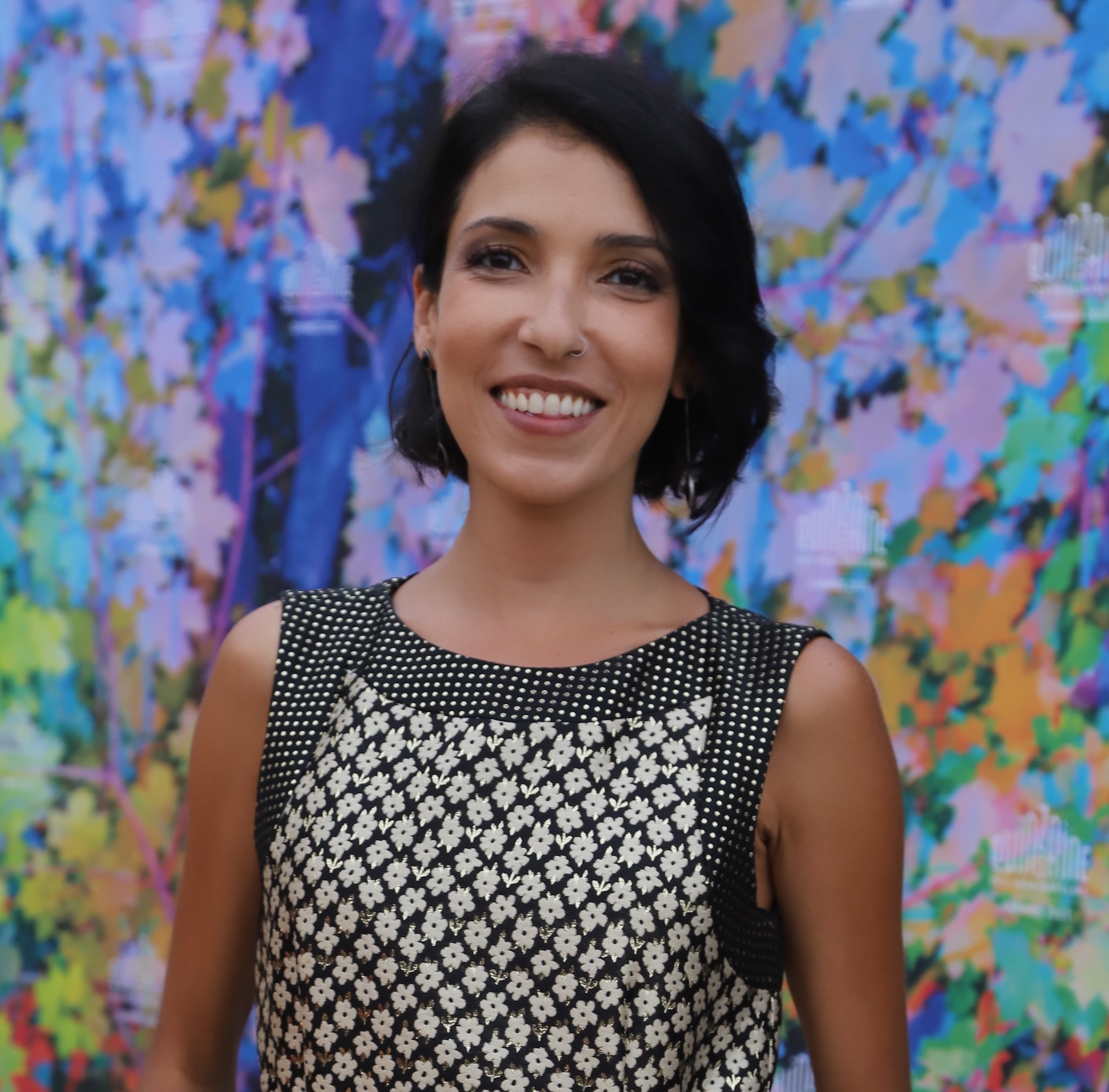
- Born: Rio de Janeiro, Brazil
- Occupations: Director, writer, editor, producer
- Years active: 2008–present

Anita Rocha da Silveira is a Brazilian film director and screenwriter. She is best known for directing the films Kill Me Please and Medusa.

== Biography ==
Silveira was born and raised in Rio de Janeiro. In 2011, she had her first international premiere at a bigger film festival with her short film Handball being selected to International Short Film Festival Oberhausen. In 2012, her short film The Living Dead (Os Mortos-Vivos), screened at the Cannes Directors' Fortnight. Her debut feature film Kill Me Please, premiered at the 72nd Venice International Film Festival in the Orizzonti section in 2015. Her second feature film Medusa, premiered at the Cannes Directors' Fortnight and Toronto International Film Festival in 2021. She was invited to become a member of the Academy of Motion Picture Arts and Sciences in 2023.

== Filmography ==
Year	Title	Contribution	Note
2008	O vampiro do meio-dia	Director, writer and editor	Short film
2010	Handball (Handebol)	Director, writer and editor	Short film
2012	The Living Dead (Os Mortos-Vivos)	Director, writer, editor and producer	Short film
2015	Kill Me Please (Mate-me Por Favor)	Director and writer	Feature film
2021	Medusa	Director and writer	Feature film

== Awards and nominations ==
Year	Result	Award	Category	Work	Ref.
2011	Nominated	International Short Film Festival Oberhausen	Best Film	Handebol (Handball)	
2011	Won	International Federation of Film Critics	Best Film	Handebol (Handball)	
2015	Won	Rio de Janeiro International Film Festival	Best Director	Kill Me Please (Mate-me Por Favor)	
2015	Nominated	Venice Film Festival	Best Film	Kill Me Please (Mate-me Por Favor)	
2016	Nominated	South by Southwest	SXSW Gamechanger Award	Kill Me Please (Mate-me Por Favor)	
2021	Won	Sitges Film Festival	Best Director	Medusa	
2021	Won	San Sebastián International Film Festival	Sebastiane Award	Medusa	
2021	Won	Rio de Janeiro International Film Festival	Best Director and Best Film	Medusa	
2021	Won	Raindance Film Festival	Best International Feature	Medusa	
2022	Won	Tromsø International Film Festival	Aurora Prize	Medusa	
2022	Won	Palm Springs International Film Festival	Ibero-American Award	Medusa	
