= Quanto Mais Vida, Melhor! =

- Genre: Telenovela
- Created by: Mauro Wilson
- Written by: Marcelo Gonçalves; Mariana Torres; Rodrigo Salomão
- Directed by: Pedro Brenelli; Allan Fiterman
- Starring: Giovanna Antonelli; Vladimir Brichta; Mateus Solano; Valentina Herszage
- Theme music composer: Ludwig van Beethoven
- Opening theme: "Symphony No. 5"
- Country of origin: Brazil
- Original language: Portuguese
- No. of seasons: 1
- No. of episodes: 161 (70 International version)

Production
- Camera setup: Multi-camera

Original release
- Network: TV Globo
- Release: 22 November 2021 – 27 May 2022

Quanto Mais Vida, Melhor! (English title: A Life to Die For) is a Brazilian telenovela produced and broadcast by TV Globo. It aired from 22 November 2021 to 27 May 2022. The telenovela is written by Mauro Wilson, with the collaboration of Marcelo Gonçalves, Mariana Torres, and Rodrigo Salomão. It stars Giovanna Antonelli, Vladimir Brichta, Mateus Solano, and Valentina Herszage.

The series revolves around four different people who, after going through the experience of facing Death together, are given a second chance at life.

== Plot ==
After dying in a plane crash, Neném, Paula, Guilherme, and Flávia are given a second chance at life by Death under one condition: they have to fix their lives and that one of them will definitively die in one year. Paula (Giovanna Antonelli) is a fashionista businesswoman who owns a cosmetics company, and has a bad relationship with her daughter, Ingrid, because of her introspective way of life. She is at war in business with Carmem, owner of a competitor company, who schemes to destroy her with the help of her lover Marcelo, who seduces Paula to spy on her. Neném (Vladimir Brichta) is a retired soccer player who lives with his mother, his two ex-wives, and the two daughters he had with each wife: Martina, who dreams of becoming a soccer player, and Bianca, who has an illness. Neném decides to gain his career back in order to pay for Bianca's treatment. Guilherme (Mateus Solano) is a successful surgeon who has dedicated his entire life to his job, forgetting about his family. He wants to save his failing marriage to Rose and his turbulent relationship with his son Antonio. Flávia (Valentina Herszage) a pole dancer who decides to change her life. She bonds with Paula, creating a mother-daughter relationship with her, much to the annoyance of Ingrid. She gets into complicated romances with Guilherme and Gabriel, Carmem's son, besides Murilo being attracted to her, causing the envy of Vanda and Ingrid, who are both in love with him.

== Cast ==
- Giovanna Antonelli as Paula Terrare / Eliete
  - Giulia Costa as Young Eliete
- Vladimir Brichta as Luca Marino "Neném"
  - Leonardo Zanchin as Young Neném
  - João Bravo as Child Neném
- Mateus Solano as Guilherme Monteiro Bragança
  - Nicolas Ahnert as Young Guilherme
- Valentina Herszage as Flávia Santana
- Bárbara Colen as Rose Costa Grava Monteiro Bragança
  - Carol Macedo as Young Rose
- Júlia Lemmertz as Carmem Wollinger
- Evelyn Castro as Deusilene dos Santos "Deusa"
- Thardelly Lima as Odaílson Pafúncio Ferreira
- Luciana Paes as Odete
  - Renata Benicá as Young Odete
- Fabio Herford as Juca
- Mariana Nunes as Dr. Joana Valadares
- Bruno Cabrerizo as Marcelo Pereira
- Felipe Abib as Ronildo Marino "Roni"
  - José Victor Pires as Young Roni
  - Fred Garcia as Child Roni
- Valentina Bandeira as Cora Maria de Aparecida
- Pedroca Monteiro as Deputy Prado
- Jussara Freire as Antônia "Tuninha"
- Zezeh Barbosa as Tetê
- Marcelo Flores as Waldemar Silva "Trombada"
- Nina Tomsic as Ingrid Terrare
- Ana Hikari as Vanda "Vandinha"
- Matheus Abreu as Antônio Costa Grava Monteiro Bragança "Tigrão"
- Karina Dohme as Maria Teresa Santos "Teca"
- Carol Garcia as Betina "Beta"
- Micheli Machado as Jandira
  - Maíra Sá Ribeiro as Young Jandira
- Jaffar Bambirra as Murilo
- Caio Manhente as Gabriel Wollinger
- Cridemar Aquino as Deputy Nunes
- Sérgio Menezes as Chicão
- Tadeu Mello as Nilton Braga
- Camila Rocha as Soraia
- Fabrício Assis as Cabeça
- Diego Francisco as Denis
- Alessandro Brandão as Chefe
- Carol Marra as Alice Fernandes Junqueira Paiva
- João Fenerich as Dr. Soares
- Gabriel Sanches as Roberto Cintra "Bebeto"
- Maria Sílvia Radomille as Regina
- Séfora Rangel as Rute
- Alex Nader as Conrado Tavares
- Cândido Damm as Celso Terrare
- A Maia as Morte
- Agnes Brichta as Martina Marino "Tina"
- Sara Vidal as Bianca Marino "Bibi"
- André Silberg as Leco
- Carlos Silberg as Neco
- Ana Lúcia Torre as Celina Monteiro Bragança
- Tato Gabus Mendes as Daniel Monteiro Bragança
- Marcos Caruso as Osvaldo
- Elizabeth Savalla as Nedda
  - Bianca Joy Porte as Young Nedda
- Renato Livera as Arthur Gomes "Tucão"
- Stepan Nercessian as Edson
  - Pierre Santos as Young Edson
- Akin Garragar as Lázaro
- Carlos Lopes as Carlinhos
- Osvaldo Baraúna as Marcão
- Ítallo Vilane as Jura
- Felipe Hintze as Deputy Torres

=== Guest stars ===
- Nany People as Lourdes / Madame Lu
- Lucio Mauro Filho as Cardoso
- Débora Lamm as Simone Gonçalves
- Gillray Coutinho as Jairo
- Alex Escobar as himself
- Zico as himself
- Luciano Huck as himself
- Diogo Nogueira as Zé do Pasto
- Dejan Petković as himself
- Adílio as himself
- Donizete Pantera as himself
- Túlio Maravilha as himself
- Nunes as himself
- Galvão Bueno as himself

== Production ==
Originally, the telenovela was to be titled A Morte Pode Esperar (Death Can Wait), but due to the deaths caused by the COVID-19 pandemic, it was changed to Quanto Mais Vida, Melhor! (The More Life, the Better!). Filming began on 17 November 2020.

== Ratings ==
Season	Episodes	First aired		Last aired		Avg. viewers (points)
Season	Episodes	Date	Viewers (points)	Date	Viewers (points)	Avg. viewers (points)
1	161	22 November 2021	21.7	27 May 2022	23.9	20.5

The first episode of Quanto Mais Vida, Melhor! on 22 November 2021 drew a rating of 21.7%, the worst debut for the 7 p.m. telenovela (novelas das sete) timeslot in 51 years since Pigmalião 70 premiered with a 20% rating on 2 March 1970. It was also the lowest pilot-episode rating in more than two years since the premiere of Verão 90 drew a rating of 23.6% on 29 January 2019.
