= Long Way Home (2018 film) =

2007 film by Júlio Bressane

- Film poster
- Portuguese: Temporada
- Directed by: André Novais Oliveira
- Written by: André Novais Oliveira
- Produced by: Gabriel Martins; Maurilio Martins; André Novais Oliveira
- Starring: Alessandra Negrini; Miguel Falabella; Bruno Garcia
- Cinematography: Wilssa Esser
- Edited by: Gabriel Martins
- Music by: Pedro Santiago
- Production company: Filmes de Plástico
- Distributed by: Netflix
- Release dates: August 5, 2018 (Locarno Film Festival); January 17, 2019
- Running time: 113 minutes
- Country: Brazil
- Language: Portuguese

Long Way Home (Portuguese: Temporada) is a 2018 Brazilian drama film directed by André Novais Oliveira. The film won five awards at the 51°. Brasília Film Festival, including Best Picture.

== Cast ==
- Grace Passô... Juliana
- Russo Apr ... Russão
- Rejane Faria ... Lúcia
- Hélio Ricardo ... Hélio
- Juliana Abreu ... Jaque
- Renato Novaes ... Jairo

== Awards ==
2018: AFI Fest

1. New Auteurs Audience Award (Nominee)

2018: Festival de Brasília

1. Best Film (won)
2. Best Actress (Grace Passô) (won)
3. Best Supporting Actor (Russo Apr) (won)
4. Best Art Direction (Diogo Hayashi) (won)
5. Best Cinematography (Wilssa Esser) (won)
