= Colégio Santa Cruz, São Paulo =

Colégio Santa Cruz
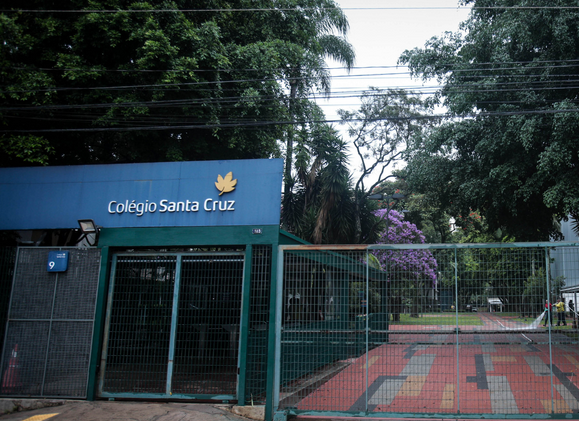
- Facade of the Colégio Santa Cruz

Location
- São Paulo, São Paulo, 05466-000; Brazil; 23.551°S 46.717°W

Information
- Religious affiliation: Catholic
- Established: September 15, 1952
- Founder: Father Corbeil, C.S.C.
- School district: Alto de Pinheiros
- Headmaster: Fábio Aidar
- Faculty: 626
- Enrollment: 3,300
- Classrooms: Campus Arruda: 93 classrooms
- Campuses: Campus Arruda, Campus Butantã, Campus Orobó
- Colors: blue and yellow
- Nickname: Santa, Santinha
- Affiliations: Congregation of Holy Cross
- Website: santacruz.g12.br

Colégio Santa Cruz is a private educational institution located in Alto de Pinheiros, São Paulo,São Paulo, Brazil. It was founded in 1952 by Canadian priests from the Congregation of Holy Cross. The school has notable alumni, including Chico Buarque, Fernando Meirelles, Candido Bracher, and Marcelo Rubens Paiva. It is a Catholic school, pluralistic, open to students of all religions, and committed to diversity of ideas and respect for different opinions.

The school has established itself as a prestigious humanistic educational institution, forming critical and engaged citizens.

Located in Alto de Pinheiros, the main campus, Campus Arruda, spans 50,000 m^{2} and serves approximately 3,000 students, including regular and night courses (EJA and technical courses). The school also has a campus in the Butantã neighborhood for sports activities and social projects.

In 2021, the school launched the Santa Plural Program, which promotes anti-racist education. One of its pillars is increasing racial diversity in the school through quotas and scholarships for Black and Indigenous students.

In 2025, the school inaugurated Campus Orobó, dedicated to Early Childhood Education and the first year of Elementary School, serving about 300 children. Located one block from Campus Arruda, on a 3,000 m² plot, the new campus features spaces and facilities designed to enhance early childhood education.

== Congregation ==
The Congregation of Holy Cross is the institution’s managing body. It is also affiliated with Colégio Santa Maria, located in the southern zone of São Paulo, as well as Notre Dame School in Campinas, São Paulo, and Colégio Dom Amando in Santarém, Pará.

== Notable alumni ==
- Chico Buarque OMC • ComIH, singer, songwriter, and writer
- Didi Wagner, television host
- Eduardo Giannetti, economist
- Fernando Grostein, filmmaker
- Fernando Limongi, political scientist
- Fernando Meirelles ORB • OMC, filmmaker
- Lucas Di Grassi, racing driver and former Formula 1 driver
- Luciano Huck, television host
- Mallu Magalhães, singer-songwriter
- Marcelo Rubens Paiva, writer
- Marina Person, actress, filmmaker, and presenter
- Ricardo Kotscho, writer and journalist
- Tim Bernardes, singer, songwriter, music producer, and member of the band O Terno
- Xexa, former player of the Brazil men's national handball team
- Zeeba, singer and songwriter

== Other notable people ==
- Father Charbonneau (creator of the pedagogical project)
- Father Corbeil (Founder)
- Prof. Luiz Eduardo Cerqueira Magalhães (Former headmaster)
- Prof. Antônio Mendonça (Former teacher)
