= Pablo & Luisão =

Brazilian TV show

- Genre: Comedy
- Created by: Paulo Vieira
- Written by: Paulo Vieira; Maurício Rizzo; Bia Braune; Caito Mainier; Nathália Cruz; Patrick Sonata
- Directed by: Luis Felipe Sá
- Starring: Aílton Graça; Otávio Müller; Dira Paes; Yves Miguel; João Pedro Martins; Paulo Vieira (narrator)
- Theme music composer: Juraildes da Cruz
- Opening theme: "Nois é Jeca Mais é Joia" by Genésio Tocantins
- Country of origin: Brazil
- Original language: Portuguese
- No. of seasons: 1
- No. of episodes: 16

Production
- Executive producer: Claudio Dager
- Producer: Leilanie Silva
- Production location: Brazil
- Camera setup: Single-camera
- Running time: 30 min.
- Production company: Estúdios Globo

Original release
- Network: Globoplay
- Release: May 22, 2025 – present

Pablo & Luisão is a Brazilian semi-autobiographical sitcom created by Paulo Vieira, directed by Luis Felipe Sá and produced by Estúdios Globo. The first season premiered on 22 May 2025 on the streaming platform Globoplay, and later premiering on TV Globo on July 7 2025.

Loosely inspired by Vieira's childhood memories of his father and best friend's exploits together, the series stars Aílton Graça, Otávio Müller, Dira Paes, Yves Miguel, and João Pedro Martins in the leading roles. and is written by Vieira in partnership with Bia Braune, Caito Mainier, Maurício Rizzo, Nathalia Cruz, and Patrick Sonata.

== Premise ==
The series follows the entertaining and chaotic adventures of Luisão (Ailton Graça), father of comedian Paulo Vieira, and his inseparable friend Pablo (Otávio Müller). Together, they constantly come up with crazy plans that end up having unusual consequences – especially for Paulo's children (Yves Miguel), his brother Neto (João Pedro Martins) and the boys' mother, Conceição (Dira Paes). Inspired by real events from Paulo Vieira's childhood, the plot mixes humour and family affection.

== Cast ==
=== Main ===
- Aílton Graça as Luis Vieira da Silva (Luisão)
- Otávio Müller as Pablo Xavier
- Dira Paes as Conceição Vieira da Silva (Ceição)
- Yves Miguel as young Paulo Henrique Vieira da Silva
- João Pedro Martins as Neto Vieira da Silva
- Paulo Vieira as Narrator (voice)

=== Guest cast ===
Actor	Character	Episode
Karine Teles	Selma Santana	"A Cerca Elétrica"
Solange Couto	Dona Sofia	"A Cerca Elétrica"
Caetano Veloso	Narrator (special appearance)	"A Cerca Elétrica"
Miguel Falabella	Padre Sebastião	"Padre Trambiqueiro"
Maria Mônica	Véia Perpértua	"Padre Trambiqueiro"
Theo Matos	Anão	"Sala Comercial"
Evaldo Macarrão	Erezinho	"Meu Filho Usa Drogas"
Rafael Vitti	Military Police Arthur Oliveira	"Meu Filho Usa Drogas"
Orã Figueiredo	Military Police André Coelho	"Meu Filho Usa Drogas"
Rodrigo Fagundes	Diretor Luís	"Meu Filho Usa Drogas"
Grace Gianoukas	Verônica	"Galo Pica-Pau"
Welder Rodrigues	Caçador / Matador	"Galo Pica-Pau"
Rejane Faria	Tia Vera	"Tia Vera" / "Enterro do Tio Zé"
Carlos Francisco	Tio Zé	"Tia Vera" / "Enterro do Tio Zé"
Marcelo Adnet	Bigode	"Avestruz Maxx"
Gero Camilo	Reynaldo	"Avestruz Maxx"
Grace Passô	A Gomes	"Luís e Luan"
Gillray Coutinho	Radio broadcaster	"Luís e Luan"
Paulo Mathias Jr.	Tito	"A Concessionária Pablo"
David Pinheiro	Flávio	"A Concessionária Pablo" / "Enterro do Tio Zé"
Márcio Vito	Zeca	"Aniversário do Neto"
Clarissa Pinheiro	Claudia	"Monga"
Thogun Teixeira	Security guard	"Monga"
Charles Fricks	Fábio	"Guerra dos Salgados"
Fábio de Luca	Thiagão	"Noni"
Lima Duarte	Senhorzinho Maldonado	"Enterro do Tio Zé"

== Episodes ==
No. overall	No. in season	Title	Directed by	Written by	Original release date
1	1	"A cerca elétrica"	Luis Felipe Sá	Paulo Vieira, Bia Braune, Caito Mainier, Maurício Rizzo, Nathália Cruz, Patrick Sonata	22 May 2025
Conceição demands a wall around the house. After several failed attempts, Pablo and Luisão install an electric fence that causes a blackout and chaos across the entire neighborhood.
2	2	"Padre trambiqueiro"	Luis Felipe Sá	Paulo Vieira, Bia Braune, Caito Mainier, Maurício Rizzo, Nathália Cruz, Patrick Sonata	22 May 2025
A priest makes Pablo and Luisão an offer they can't refuse. They borrow money from a loan shark to sell snacks at a pilgrimage, only to face brutal competition.
3	3	"Sala comercial"	Luis Felipe Sá	Paulo Vieira, Bia Braune, Caito Mainier, Maurício Rizzo, Nathália Cruz, Patrick Sonata	22 May 2025
To save money, Luisão moves the family into a commercial office directly opposite the children's school, putting the whole household on public display.
4	4	"Meu filho usa drogas"	Luis Felipe Sá	Paulo Vieira, Bia Braune, Caito Mainier, Maurício Rizzo, Nathália Cruz, Patrick Sonata	22 May 2025
Paulo starts acting classes. Luisão becomes convinced his son is on drugs and begins spying on him. Pablo tries to calm him with a special tea that backfires spectacularly.
5	5	"Galo pica-pau"	Luis Felipe Sá	Paulo Vieira, Bia Braune, Caito Mainier, Maurício Rizzo, Nathália Cruz, Patrick Sonata	22 May 2025
To apologise to Luisão, Pablo gifts him a fighting rooster. The bird quickly takes over the house and terrorises the family.
6	6	"Tia Vera"	Luis Felipe Sá	Paulo Vieira, Bia Braune, Caito Mainier, Maurício Rizzo, Nathália Cruz, Patrick Sonata	22 May 2025
The family visits Aunt Vera and Uncle Zé in a riverside community. Pablo and Luisão decide to hunt an alligator and immediately get into deep trouble.
7	7	"Avestruz Maxx"	Luis Felipe Sá	Paulo Vieira, Bia Braune, Caito Mainier, Maurício Rizzo, Nathália Cruz, Patrick Sonata	22 May 2025
Pablo, Luisão and Conceição invest their life savings in an ostrich farm that turns into a nationwide pyramid scheme.
8	8	"Luís e Luan"	Luis Felipe Sá	Paulo Vieira, Bia Braune, Caito Mainier, Maurício Rizzo, Nathália Cruz, Patrick Sonata	22 May 2025
A dodgy businesswoman convinces Pablo and Luisão to record a country album and tour. Their sudden "fame" lands them on the front page of the newspaper for all the wrong reasons.
9	9	"A concessionária Pablo"	Luis Felipe Sá	Paulo Vieira, Bia Braune, Caito Mainier, Maurício Rizzo, Nathália Cruz, Patrick Sonata	22 May 2025
Pablo and Luisão buy another old banger. Their history of terrible cars includes a "convertible" Beetle and an Escort with a hole in the floor that almost kills the dog Kaká.
10	10	"Aniversário do Neto"	Luis Felipe Sá	Paulo Vieira, Bia Braune, Caito Mainier, Maurício Rizzo, Nathália Cruz, Patrick Sonata	22 May 2025
Luisão travels to treat a wound with Pablo's folk healer. The money runs out on the road, forcing the family to rescue him before Neto's birthday party.
11	11	"Seu Justino"	Luis Felipe Sá	Paulo Vieira, Bia Braune, Caito Mainier, Maurício Rizzo, Nathália Cruz, Patrick Sonata	22 May 2025
Luisão hires talented cook Justino for the snack factory. Justino wins Conceição's affection, making Pablo extremely jealous.
12	12	"Monga"	Luis Felipe Sá	Paulo Vieira, Bia Braune, Caito Mainier, Maurício Rizzo, Nathália Cruz, Patrick Sonata	22 May 2025
A travelling carnival arrives in Palmas. Pablo starts acting strangely; Paulo and Neto investigate while Luisão grows increasingly suspicious.
13	13	"Guerra dos salgados"	Luis Felipe Sá	Paulo Vieira, Bia Braune, Caito Mainier, Maurício Rizzo, Nathália Cruz, Patrick Sonata	22 May 2025
Pablo is arrested after fighting the school principal over the best snack-selling spot. The vendors form a union to defend their livelihood.
14	14	"Noni"	Luis Felipe Sá	Paulo Vieira, Bia Braune, Caito Mainier, Maurício Rizzo, Nathália Cruz, Patrick Sonata	22 May 2025
Pablo and Luisão discover the "miracle" noni fruit and start growing it in Palmas, accidentally threatening the town's ecosystem.
15	15	"A visita do Papa"	Luis Felipe Sá	Paulo Vieira, Bia Braune, Caito Mainier, Maurício Rizzo, Nathália Cruz, Patrick Sonata	22 May 2025
Pablo and Luisão head to Rio de Janeiro with the kids to see Pope Francis. Back home, Conceição is forced to host dozens of pilgrims.
16	16	"Enterro do tio Zé"	Luis Felipe Sá	Paulo Vieira, Bia Braune, Caito Mainier, Maurício Rizzo, Nathália Cruz, Patrick Sonata	22 May 2025
At Uncle Zé's chaotic wake, Pablo and Luisão end their friendship. The arrival of the deceased's childhood friend moves everyone to tears.

== Production ==
The idea for the series began to take shape from a thread created by Paulo Vieira on Twitter in 2020. On social media, Paulo began sharing unbelievable moments from his family life and the confusion created by his father and best friend, making the subject go viral. Since then, fans have been suggesting that a book, film or series be made based on the stories.

The series began pre-production in 2023, following the success of Avisa Lá Que Eu Vou, also hosted by Paulo Vieira. In August 2023, it was announced that Allan Fiterman would be the artistic director of the series, but he was eventually replaced by Luis Felipe Sá, after taking over as director of soap opera No Rancho Fundo. The work was initially commissioned for 2024, but its release was postponed to 2025, being replaced by Tô Nessa on TV Globo and Cosme e Damião: Quase Santos on streaming. The broadcaster's decision was part of Grupo Globo's resumption of comedy productions, both on free-to-air television and streaming.

Actor Antônio Fagundes was approached for the cast, but no agreement was reached with the broadcaster. Off the air since Mar do Sertão, Clarissa Pinheiro secured a special appearance as a dancer. The series marks Miguel Falabella's return to the network after his last appearance on Globo in Cine Holliúdy in the 2019 season. The production also marked Lima Duarte's return to drama, after appearing in 2022 in the first phase of the soap opera Além da Ilusão.

With a huge impact, linked to praise from the public and the specialised media, as well as occupying second place among the most viewed products on Globoplay in one week, the show has been renewed for a second season in 2026.

== Broadcast ==
With the huge repercussions, TV Globo aired the first episode on Espiadinha Globoplay, a programme that shows streaming productions on open TV, on 7 July 2025, in addition to confirming its regular broadcast in the 2026 schedule.
