= Caio Horowicz =

Brazilian actress

- Caio Horowicz Rezende
- Born: 24 January 1996 (age 29); São Paulo, Brazil
- Occupation: Actor
- Known for: Boca a Boca, Bacurau

Caio Horowicz Rezende (born 24 January 1996) is a Brazilian actor. He became known for starring the TV Series "Boca a Boca" by Netflix. He won the 2015 Festival do Rio in the Supporting Actor category and the 2020 Prêmio Contigo in the Best Actor category.

== Filmography ==
=== Movies ===
Year	Title	Role	Notes
2024	I'm Still Here	Pimpão	
2021	A Torre	Homem na floresta	
2020	Música para Morrer de Amor	Felipe	
2019	Hebe: A Estrela do Brasil	Marcello Camargo	
2018	Sueño Florianópolis	César	
2017	Seja Bem-vindo!	Rafael	Curta-metragem
2016	Love Snaps	Felipe	Curta-metragem
2015	Califórnia	JM	

=== Television ===
Ano	Título	Personagem	Notas
2021	5x Comédia	Cliente chapado	Episódio: "Sexo Online"
2020	Boca a Boca	Alex Nero	Elenco principal
2020	Hebe	Marcello Camargo	
2014	Que Monstro te Mordeu?	Super Tom	
2013	Família Imperial	Jonas Torres Imperial/Alphonso Imperial	2012-2013
2013	Vitrola	Gabriel	Filme da TV Cultura

== Awards and nominations ==
Year	Award	Category	Work	Result
2015	Festival do Rio	Melhor Ator Coadjuvante	Califórnia	Won
2020	Prêmio Contigo! de TV	Melhor Ator de Série	Boca a Boca	Nominated
2020	Prêmio F5	Melhor Ator de Série Dramática	Boca a Boca	Nominated
2020	Festival Sesc Melhores Filmes	Melhor Ator Nacional	Música Para Morrer de Amor	Pending
