= Grace Passô =

Brazilian actress

Grace Passo
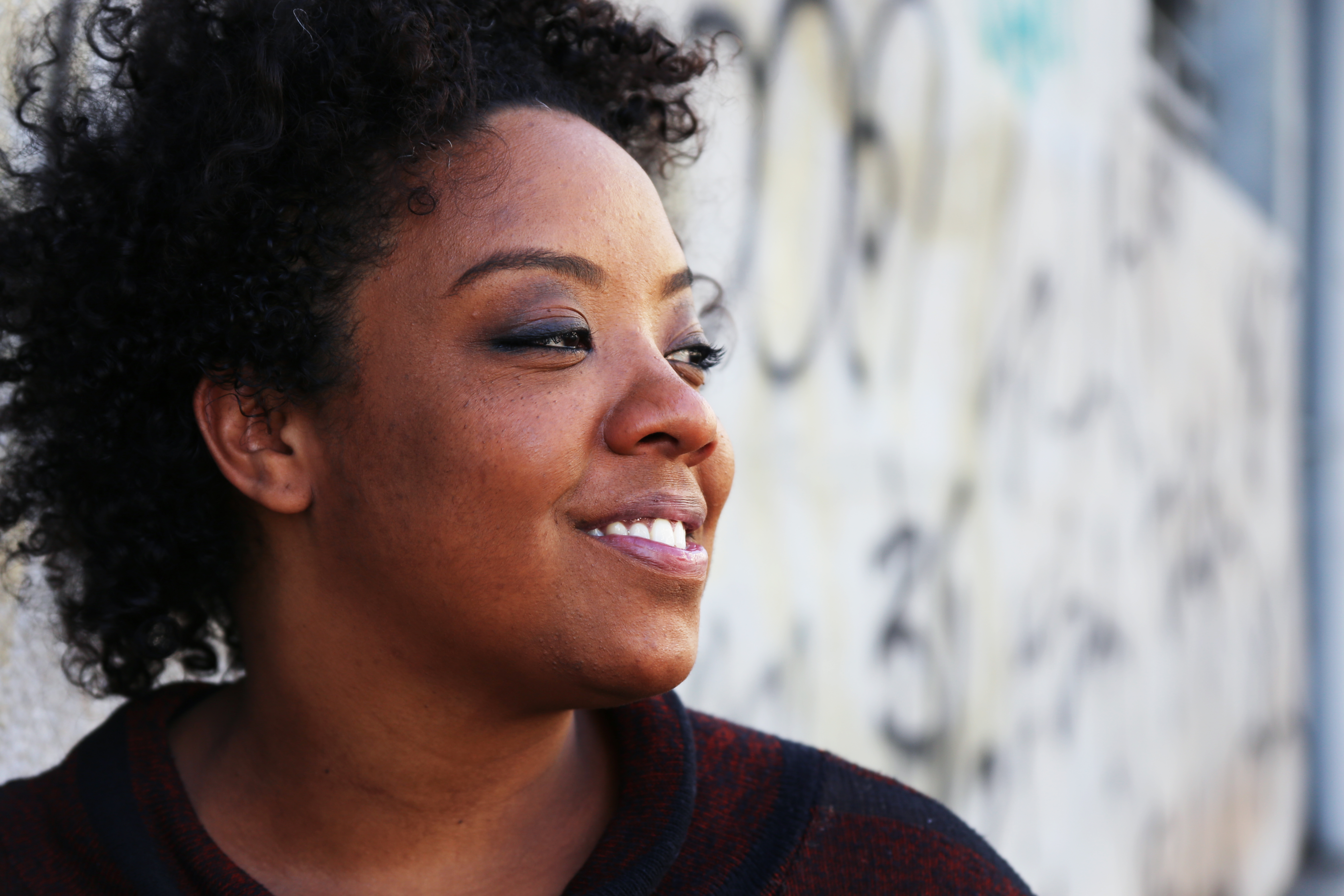
- Born: 20 May 1980 (age 46); Pirapora, Minas Gerais, Brazil
- Occupation: Actress
- Years active: 2000 - present
- Known for: Boca a Boca

Grace Passô (born May 20, 1980) is a Brazilian actress, director and playwright. Her film acting credits include Temporada and Praça Paris.

As a writer, Passô has won the Associação Paulista de Críticos de Arte Award for "Best Playwright.

== Filmography ==
=== Movies ===
Year	Title	Role	Notes
2008	Fronteira		
2011	O Céu sobre os Ombros		
2016	Elon Não Acredita na Morte	Graça	
2016	O Roubo da Taça	Verinha	
2018	Praça Paris	Glória	
2018	Temporada	Juliana	
2019	No Coração do Mundo	Selma	
2020	Vaga Carne		
2020	Enquanto estamos aqui	Narradora	
2020	República		curta-metragem
2020	Transmissão	Anjo	
2026	Our Secret	Director	Directorial debut film
2026	On Behalf of My Son	Isabel	

=== Television ===
Year	Title	Role	Notes
2014	O Caçador	Vânia	
2020	Boca a Boca	Dalva	6 episódios
2021	Onde Está Meu Coração	Drª Célia	4 episodes
2025	Pablo & Luisão	A Gomes	Episode: "Luís e Luan"
