= Kill Me Please (2015 film) =

Film by Anita Rocha da Silveira

- Theatrical release poster
- Portuguese: Mate-Me Por Favor
- Directed by: Anita Rocha da Silveira
- Written by: Anita Rocha da Silveira
- Produced by: Vânia Catani
- Starring: Valentina Herszage; Dora Freind; Júlia Roliz; Mari Oliveira; Bernardo Marinho
- Cinematography: João Atala
- Edited by: Marília Moraes
- Music by: Bernardo Uzeda
- Production companies: Bananeira Filmes; Rei Cine
- Distributed by: Imovision
- Release dates: 9 September 2015 (Venice); 15 September 2016 (Brazil)
- Running time: 104 minutes
- Countries: Brazil; Argentina
- Language: Portuguese

Kill Me Please (Portuguese: Mate-Me Por Favor) is a 2015 teen thriller film written and directed by Anita Rocha da Silveira in her directorial debut. It premiered in the Horizons section of the 72nd Venice International Film Festival, and was later awarded for best director and best actress (Valentina Herszage) at the 2015 Rio de Janeiro International Film Festival.

== Premise ==
A wave of murderers plague the Barra da Tijuca neighborhood of Rio de Janeiro. What starts off as a morbid curiosity for the local youth slowly begins to eat away at their lives. Among them is Bia, a 15-year-old girl. After an encounter with death, she will do anything to ensure she stays alive.

== Cast ==
- Valentina Herszage as Bia
- Dora Freind as Renata
- Mari Oliveira as Mariana
- Júlia Roliz as Michele
- Rita Pauls as Dead Girl
- Laryssa Ayres as Amanda
- Vicente Conde as Bernardo
- Bernardo Marinho as João
- Antara Morri as Nicole
