= Rubens Paiva =

Brazilian civil engineer and politician

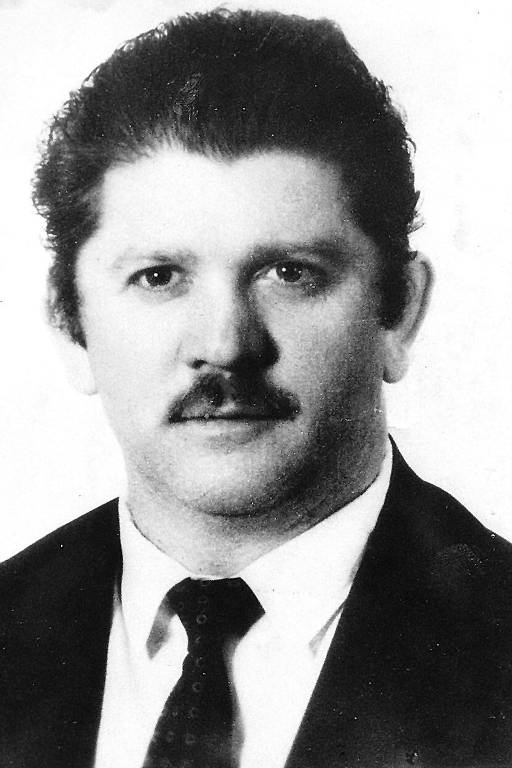

Member of the Chamber of Deputies
- In office 2 February 1963 – 10 April 1964
- Constituency: São Paulo

Personal details
- Born: Rubens Beyrodt Paiva; 26 December 1929 Santos, São Paulo, Brazil
- Disappeared: 20 January 1971 (aged 41); Rio de Janeiro, Guanabara, Brazil
- Status: Declared dead in absentia
- Education: Mackenzie Presbyterian University
- Occupations: Civil engineer, journalist, student activist, politician
- Political party: PTB (1962–1965)
- Spouse: Eunice Paiva (m. 1952)
- Children: 5, including Marcelo

Rubens Beyrodt Paiva (Brazilian Portuguese: [ˈʁubẽs ˈpajvɐ]; 26 December 1929 – 21 January 1971) was a Brazilian civil engineer and politician who, as a Congressman at the Brazilian Chamber of Deputies, opposed the implementation of the military dictatorship in Brazil in 1964. Due to his involvement with activities deemed subversive by the dictatorial regime, he was arrested by the military forces, tortured, and murdered. His body hasn’t been recovered.

== Biography ==
=== Early life ===
Rubens Paiva was born in Santos, São Paulo. He was the son of Jaime Almeida Paiva, a lawyer and farmer, and Araci Beyrodt. He was married to Maria Lucrécia Eunice Facciolla Paiva, with whom he had five children: Marcelo Rubens Paiva, Vera Silvia Facciolla Paiva, Maria Eliana Facciolla Paiva, Ana Lucia Facciolla Paiva and Maria Beatriz Facciolla Paiva.

Paiva graduated with a BA in civil engineering from the Mackenzie Presbyterian University in 1954. He joined the "Oil is Ours" nationalist campaign for state monopoly on oil in Brazil as a member of the student council. During his college years, he was the president of the Academic Center of the Civil Engineering Students and vice-president of the São Paulo Union of Students.

=== Political career ===
Paiva's political career began in October 1962, when he was elected Congressman for the state of São Paulo by the Brazilian Labour Party. He took office in February of the next year and became a member of the Congressional Committee created to examine the activities of both the Institute of Research and Social Studies and the Brazilian Institute for Democratic Action. Those two organizations were under the suspicion of funding propaganda about a possible "red menace" in Brazil. The committee also accused some high-ranking military officers of receiving bribery from the two entities, in a scheme that supposedly financed the military coup d'état on 1 April 1964. However, the Investigation Committee never presented any proof of such allegations. After the Brazilian government was overthrown in 1964, Paiva, among other politicians, had his congressional tenure revoked by the military government on 10 April 1964.

=== Exile and return ===
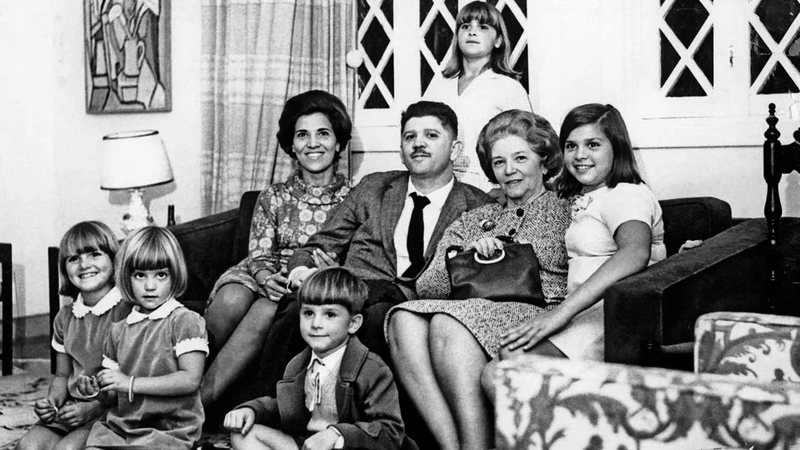
Paiva family in the 1960s

Shortly after the coup, Paiva voluntarily left Brazil for self-exile in Yugoslavia and in France. Nine months later, he was supposed to fly to Buenos Aires for a meeting with the deposed left-wing leaders João Goulart and Leonel Brizola. During the layover in Rio de Janeiro, he left the plane and boarded a flight to São Paulo, heading to his house, where his wife and children lived. Paiva then moved with his family to Rio de Janeiro and returned to work as a civil engineer, while continuing to collaborate with and assist exiled rebels' family members to receive letters from the exiled in Brazil and abroad. He was not part of any armed guerrilla activity, but rather aided people deemed subversive by the military dictatorship.

Paiva co-founded the newspaper Jornal de Debates and was the last director of Última Hora in São Paulo, before Samuel Wainer sold it to Grupo Folha.

When returning from a trip to Santiago, Chile, where he had been helping the exiled daughter of his friend Bocaiúva Cunha, Paiva was mistakenly identified as a contact of "Adriano", which was the contact of Carlos Lamarca, then the top of the Brazil's dictatorship‘s list of most-wanted terrorists.

=== Arrest and disappearance ===
Hoping to catch "Adriano" and thus reach Lamarca, the military forces raided Paiva's house in Rio de Janeiro and arrested him on 20 January 1971. The action was conducted by armed men who claimed to be members of the Brazilian Air Force.

After the raid, Paiva was reported missing. According to documents published by the Brazilian military, the car that was conducting Paiva to the Center for Internal Defense Operations prison was forcibly stopped by unknown individuals who rescued him.

Paiva's wife Eunice was also arrested during the same operation. She remained incommunicado for twelve days. Eliana, the couple's 15-year-old daughter, was held in the same prison for 24 hours. Eunice and Eliana were interrogated in the same DOI-CODI room where suspected communist agents were tortured. They claimed to have seen blood, the pau de arara and the portrait of Paiva in the tokens of recognition. They also said to have heard the screams from prisoners apparently being tortured.

While his wife and daughter were being interrogated, Paiva was transferred to the Department of Internal Operations. Testimony given decades later to the National Truth Commission by a Brazilian Army doctor and former military officers stated that Paiva died in an army barracks two days after his arrest from injuries related to torture.

In a 1971 letter, based on accounts by other political prisoners, Eunice Paiva wrote that her husband was tortured on the same day she was arrested at the III Aerial Zone, located near Santos Dumont Airport, then under the command of João Paulo Burnier, who was also accused of torturing and killing Stuart Angel Jones.

=== Rubens Paiva in the StB Archives ===
In the Czechoslovak State Security (StB) archives in Prague, in the folder No. 11,778, entitled 'People of Political and Economic Life in Brazil', there are two letters with official reports on Rubens Paiva. Both reports were written on 27 March 1964, by a Czechoslovak communist political police chief and secret agent operating in Brazil, codenamed Moldán.

The contents of the report explain why Moldán [or rather Josef Mejstřík], took interest in Paiva. With the help of the Brazilian journalist and communist agent Maria da Graça Dutra and agents Losada and Lenco, a mapping of the ideological spectrum of several Brazilian politicians was carried out, in order to catalog the respective political orientation of each one of them. The motivation that led Moldán to carry out this work was not due to a specific intelligence task, but an official request made by the Czechoslovak ambassador in the course of his legal diplomatic activities. However, all the information collected about Paiva was sent to the headquarters of the intelligence of StB, because that acquired content, sooner or later, could be useful for the Czech Communist Party.

The Czech spy's report on Rubens Paiva says:

Rubens Paiva, congressmember and leader in one of the Congressional committees. He belongs to a more leftist wing of his party, and he is part of the so-called 'Compact Group', which reunites the most radical congressmembers under the influence of the Brazilian Communist Party, along with other radical leftist fringes. Rubens Paiva is known as a radical leftist congressman, but he does not call himself a communist. [...] I met him last year, sometime in late May during my visit to the House of Representatives Committee on Foreign Affairs, and he was introduced to me along with other members of that committee.

I verified this earlier with the help of Maria da Graça Dutra, Losada and Lenco, along with many other names. […] All three responded in a consistent assessment of Paiva as being a radical nationalist and politically combative leader. Apparently, however, he is not a member of the Communist Party.

In Moldán's second note, dated from the same day, the above information was completed. He wrote that he was convinced he could use the report to carry out active operations involving Paiva, to exploit his role in the Brazilian parliament. The Czech agent states that his contacts with the congressman would intensify and, according to the results, he would see if how far he could go.

The recruitment, however, ended up never happening. The StB documents are dated from 27 March 1964, and the military coup d'état in Brazil took place only five days later.

== In popular culture ==
Rubens Paiva is portrayed by Selton Mello in the 2024 film I'm Still Here, directed by Walter Salles. It is Salles' first Brazilian feature film in 16 years. The film had its world premiere at the 81st Venice International Film Festival, where it received critical acclaim, with unanimous praise towards Mello's and lead actress Fernanda Torres's performance, and was awarded with the Golden Osella for Best Screenplay. The screenplay was written by Murilo Hauser and Heitor Lorega, and adapted from the non-fiction memoir book Ainda Estou Aqui by Marcelo Rubens Paiva, Eunice's son. In September 2024, the film was selected as the Brazilian entry for Best International Feature Film at the 97th Academy Awards.

On 23 January 2025, it was nominated for Best International Feature Film, Best Actress (Torres), and Best Picture at the 97th Academy Awards. On the same day, Paiva's death certificate was corrected to state that he died from violent causes at the hands of the State; the previous version only stated that he was missing.

== See also ==
- Engenheiro Rubens Paiva Station, a subway station in Rio de Janeiro, named after Rubens Paiva
- List of kidnappings
- List of solved missing person cases
- Vladimir Herzog
