= Hebe: A Estrela do Brasil =

- Film poster
- Directed by: Maurício Farias
- Written by: Carolina Kotscho
- Produced by: Carolina Kotscho
- Starring: Andréa Beltrão; Marco Ricca
- Cinematography: Inti Briones
- Edited by: Joana Collier
- Music by: Branco Mello; Emerson Villani
- Production companies: Hebe Forever; Labrador Filmes; 20th Century Fox; Globo Filmes; Loma Filmes
- Distributed by: Warner Bros. Pictures
- Release date: 26 September 2019
- Running time: 112 minutes
- Country: Brazil
- Language: Portuguese

Hebe: A Estrela do Brasil (English: Hebe: The Star of Brazil) is a 2019 Brazilian biographical film directed by Maurício Farias. It stars Andréa Beltrão in the role of the TV host Hebe Camargo.

It was selected to compete for the Kikito award at the 47th Gramado Film Festival.

== Cast ==
- Andréa Beltrão as Hebe Camargo
- Marco Ricca as Lélio Ravagnani
- Danton Mello as Cláudio Pessutti
- Gabriel Braga Nunes as Décio Capuano
- Caio Horowicz as Marcello Camargo
- Danilo Grangheia as Walter Clark
- Otávio Augusto as Chacrinha
- Cláudia Missura as Nair Bello
- Karine Teles as Lolita Rodrigues
- Daniel Boaventura as Silvio Santos
- Ivo Müller as Carlucho
- Stella Miranda as Dercy Gonçalves
- Renata Bastos as Roberta Close

== Accolades ==
| Year | Award | Category | Nominee | Result | Ref. |
|---|---|---|---|---|---|
| 2019 | Gramado Film Festival | Best Picture | Hebe - A Estela do Brasil | Nominated | |
| 2019 | Gramado Film Festival | Best Editing | Joana Collier and Fernanda Krumel | Won | |
| 2020 | International Emmy Awards | Best Actress | Andréa Beltrão | Nominated | |
