= Andréa Beltrão =

Brazilian actress and playwright

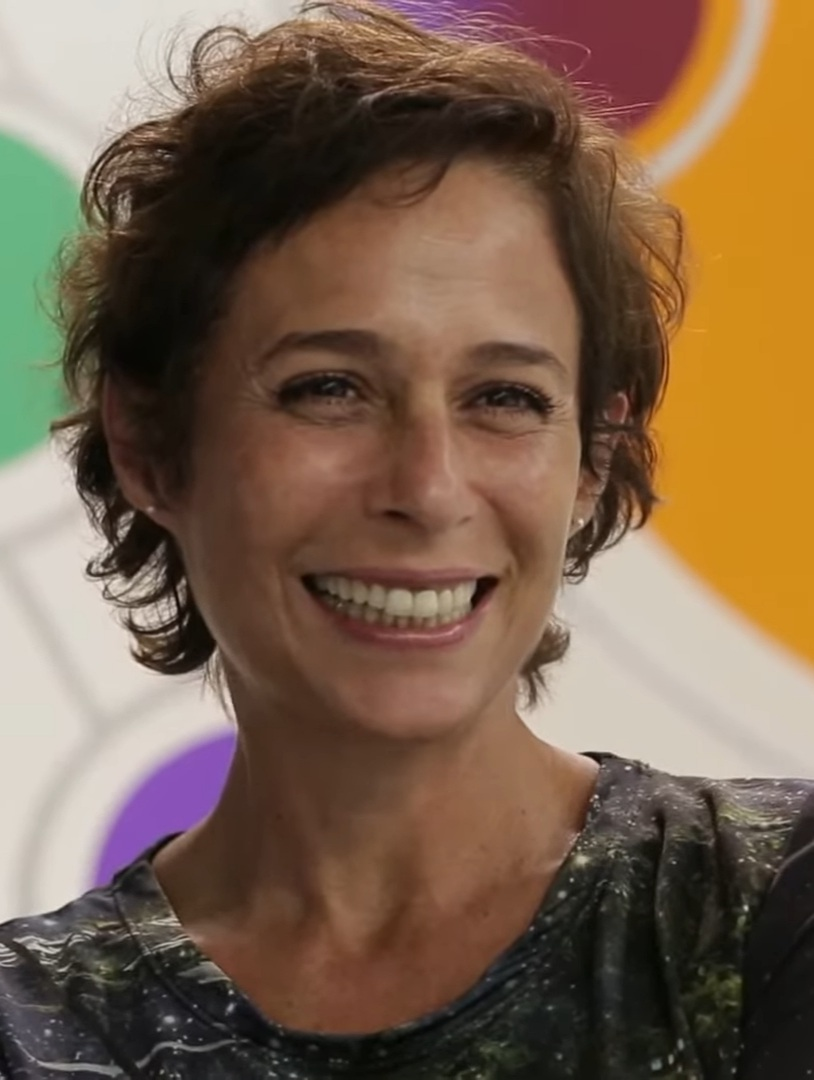
- Beltrão in 2015
- Born: Andréa Vianna Beltrão; 16 September 1963 (age 62); Rio de Janeiro, Brazil
- Occupation: Actress
- Years active: 1976–present
- Partner(s): Guel Arraes (1984–1987); Maurício Farias (1995–present)
- Children: 3

Andréa Vianna Beltrão (born 16 September 1963) is a Brazilian actress. She is most known for acting in comic roles. Especially Zelda Scott, the female protagonist of Armação Ilimitada (1985–1988), Úrsula in Pedra sobre Pedra (1992), Tônia in Mulheres de Areia (1993), one of the main characters of the plot, Lisa, one of the protagonists of A Viagem (1994), Marilda in A Grande Família (2002–2009), Sueli in Tapas & Beijos (2011–2015), and Hebe Camargo, in the film and series Hebe: A Estrela do Brasil, in which she was nominated for the International Emmy Award for Best Actress in 2020.

== Selected filmography ==
=== Television ===
Year	Title	Role	Notes
1981	Ciranda de Pedra		
1982	Elas por Elas	Regina	
1984	Corpo a Corpo	Angela Machado	
1985-1988	Armação Ilimitada	Zelda Scott	
1990	Rainha da Sucata	Ingrid Figueroa e Albuquerque de Bresson	
1992	Pedra sobre Pedra	Úrsula Pontes	
1993	Mulheres de Areia	Antônia dos Santos, "Tônia"	
1993	Radical Chic	Radical Chic	
1994	A Viagem	Lisandra Barbosa, "Lisa"	
1994	A Madona de Cedro	Marta	
1996-1997	A Comédia da Vida Privada	Various Characters	
1996	Vira Lata	Maria Helena Moreira Viana, "Lê" and "Helena"	
1998	Era uma Vez...	Bruna Reis	
1999	Zorra Total	Roberta, the PMS Girl	
1999	Você Decide		
2000	Brava Gente		
2001	As Filhas da Mãe	Tatiana Cavalcanti	
2001	Os Normais		
2002-2009	A Grande Família	Marilda Maria Rei	
2004	Sitcom.br		
2004	The Aspones	Leda Maria	
2009	Som & Fúria		
2011-2015	Tapas & Beijos	Sueli Sampaio	
2017	Cidade Proibida		
2018	Malhação: Vidas Brasileiras		
2021	Um Lugar ao Sol	Rebecca Assunção	
2024	No Rancho Fundo	Josefa "Zefa" Belmont Leonel	

=== Film ===
Year	Title	Role	Notes
1985	O Rei do Rio	Thaís	
2004	Cazuza: O Tempo Não Pára	Malu	
2011	O Bem Amado		
2019	Hebe: A Estrela do Brasil	Hebe Camargo	
