= Otávio Müller =

Brazilian actor (born 1965)

Otávio Muller
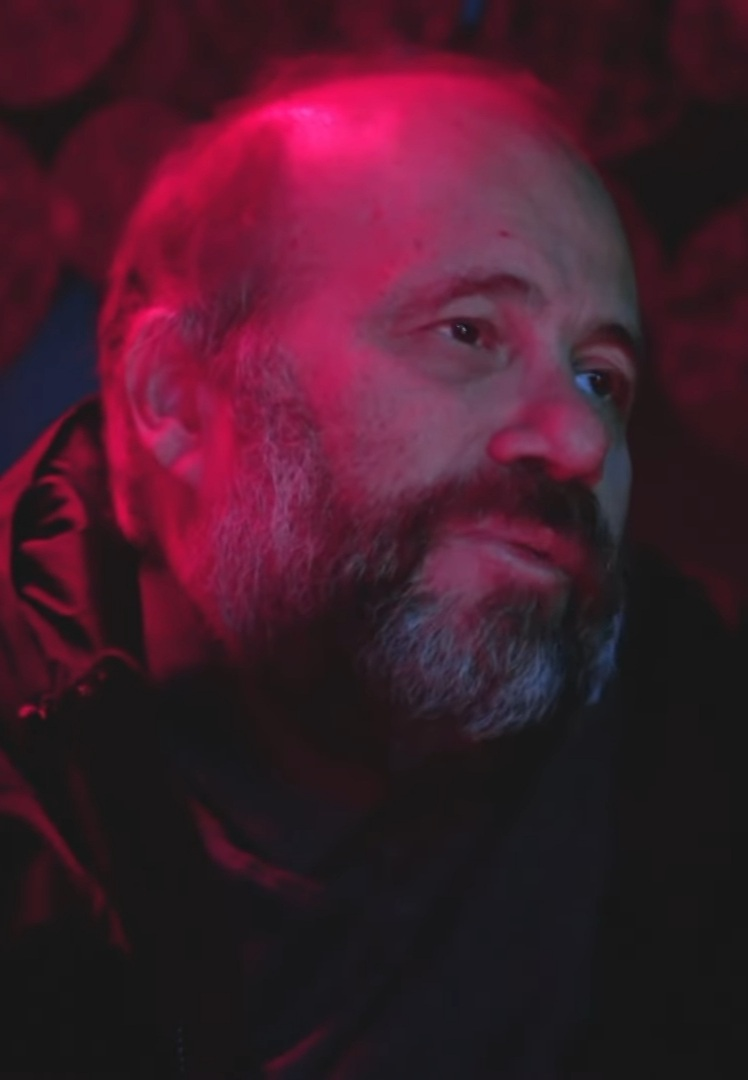
- Müller in 2023
- Born: Otávio Müller de Sá; August 6, 1965 (age 60); Rio de Janeiro, Brazil
- Occupation: Actor
- Years active: 1988–present
- Spouses: Preta Gil (m. 1994; div. 1995) Adriana Junqueira (m. 2005)
- Children: 3

Otávio Müller de Sá (born August 6, 1965), most known as Otávio Müller, is a Brazilian actor. Most known for comical roles in television, such as in the Rede Globo's series Tapas & Beijos, he is also a stage actor, and film actor. On theater, he starred in the monologue A Vida Sexual da Mulher Feia, and, on cinema, he won the Rio Film Festival Best Actor Award for The Gorilla.

He was married to Preta Gil and had a son, Francisco. Now, he is married to Adriana Junqueira with whom he had two daughters, Maria and Clara.

== Selected filmography ==
- Vale Tudo (1988)
- Força de um Desejo (1999–2000)
- Memórias Póstumas (2001)
- Desejos de Mulher (2002)
- Paraíso Tropical (2007)
- Os Amadores (2007)
- Craft (2010)
- Tapas & Beijos (2011–2013)
- Past Minutes (2013)
- Alemão (2014)
- Loveling (2018)
- Three Summers (2019)
- Guerreiros do Sol (2025)
- Pablo & Luisão (2025)
- Três Graças (2025)
