= Marcelo Rubens Paiva =

Brazilian writer (born 1959)

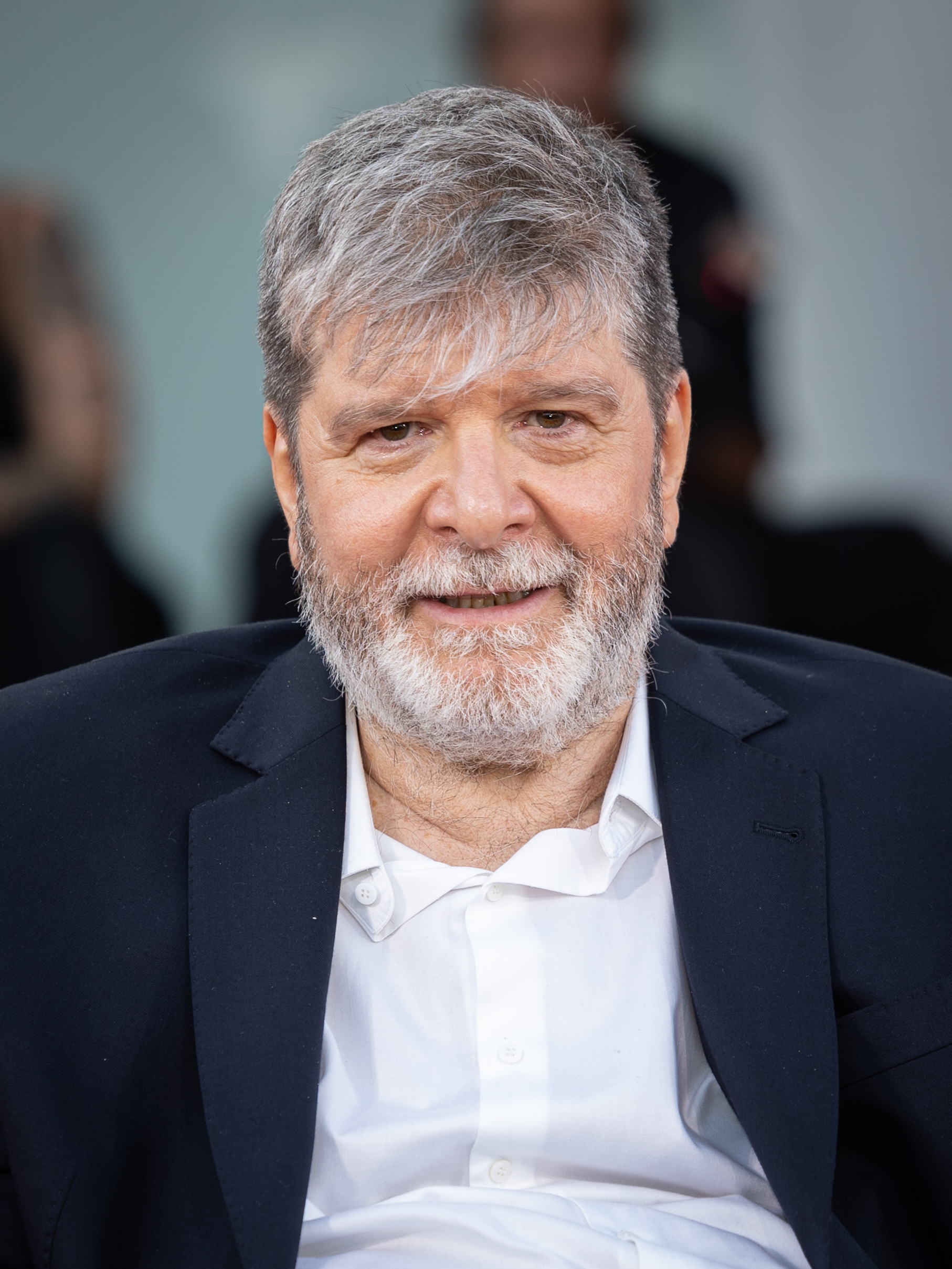
- Paiva in 2024
- Born: 1 May 1959 (age 67); São Paulo, Brazil
- Education: State University of Campinas; University of São Paulo; Stanford University
- Occupations: Novelist; playwright; screenwriter; journalist
- Parent(s): Eunice and Rubens Paiva

Marcelo Rubens Paiva (Brazilian Portuguese: [maʁˈsɛlu ˈʁubẽs ˈpajvɐ]; born 1 May 1959) is a Brazilian novelist, playwright, screenwriter and journalist born in São Paulo, Brazil. He is the son of Rubens Paiva, who was murdered during Brazil's military dictatorship in 1971. The impact of his father's disappearance on his family's life, especially on his mother, Eunice Paiva, is portrayed in his 2015 autobiography Ainda estou aqui, which served as the basis for the Oscar-winning 2024 film I'm Still Here.

== Biography ==
Marcelo Rubens Paiva is the only son of Eunice and Rubens Paiva, who also had four daughters. At the age of six he moved to the city of Rio de Janeiro in 1966, after his father, then a member of Brazil's Chamber of Deputies, was impeached and exiled following the 1964 Brazilian coup d'état. In 1971, when Marcelo was 11, his father "disappeared" after being arrested, tortured and killed in the city of Rio de Janeiro by the military. His body was never found. The Rubens Paiva family was then forced to move from the city.

He returned to live in São Paulo in 1974, and there he was a student at the Colégio Santa Cruz. He studied agricultural engineering at the State University of Campinas. When jumping into a shallow lake at 20 years old, Paiva fractured his spine and became tetraplegic. In 1983, after extensive physiotherapy, he gained the movement of both arms and hands and wrote Feliz Ano Velho (Happy Old Year), an autobiographical recollection of these events and his entire life. The book was adapted into a play directed by Paulo Betti and also a film, directed by Roberto Gervitz. It won the Jabuti Prize, the most important literary award in Brazil.

Marcelo Rubens Paiva is a writer, screenwriter and playwright. He graduated in Communication Radio & TV (USP; 1982–87), drama course (Centro de Pesquisas Teatrais do Sesc-SP; 1989–90), master in Literature (Unicamp; 1991–94) and the Knight Fellowship Program (Stanford University, CA; 1995–96).

== Career ==
He wrote for TV Teleplay with Fernando Meirelles (Olho Mágico, 1987), TV Cultura (Leitura Livre, 1984, Fanzine, 1992–94), Rede Globo (Vida ao Vivo - Fantástico, 2000, and Sexo Frágil, 2003–04), BandTV with Mauro Lima (Aventuras de Tiazinha), Multishow GloboSat (Segunda Vez, 2014, and E Aí, Comeu?, 2016). Writer's room for Conspiração (Contravenção, 2018–19) and Feliz Ano Velho (MaFilmes, 2019). He was Emmy nominated for the teleplay of O Homem Mais Forte do Mundo (TV Globo, 2018).

He has written films such as Bicho de 7 Cabeças (1999), Malu de Bicicleta (2010), E Aí, Comeu? (2012), Depois de Tudo (2015), Mais Forte que o Mundo (2016), and the docs Fiel e Polanski no Brasil. Four times nominated as best screenwriter by Academia Brasileira de Cinema. He won the ABL prize for the script of Malu de Bicicleta and wrote the screenplays of Casagrande e Seus Demônios (Globo e Paris Filmes), Código 12 (Barretos) and The Book (Tambellini Filme).

Marcelo Rubens Paiva has also written Feliz Ano Velho (1982, Prêmio Jabuti), Blecaute (1986), Ua:brari (1990), Bala na Agulha (1992), Não És Tu, Brasil (1996), Malu de Bicicleta (2003), A Segunda Vez Que Te Conheci (2009), Orangotango Marxista (2016) by Companhia das Das Letras, As Fêmeas (1994), O Homem Que Conhecia as Mulheres (2006) and As Verdades Que Ela Não Diz (2012), Ainda Estou Aqui (prêmio Jabuti 2015), Meninos em Fúria (2016), and Menino e o Foguete (Jabuti de 2017), which was translated into English, Spanish, French, Italian, German, and Czech.

He has also written theatre plays: 525 Linhas (1989), E Aí, Comeu? (1999, Prêmo Shell), Mais-Que-Imperfeito (2000), As Mentiras que os Homens Contam (2001), Closet Show (2001), No Retrovisor (2002), Amo-te (2006), A Noite Mais Fria do Ano (2009), O Predador Entra Na Sala (2010).

For the press, since 1983, he has written columns for newspapers and magazines such as Veja, Folha de S. Paulo, Vogue RG, O Estado de São Paulo, Miami Herald, San Francisco Chronicle, New York Times.

Since 2003, he has written a column for the Brazilian newspaper Estadão.

In 2024, his autobiographical novel Ainda estou aqui was adapted to film, directed by his close friend, Walter Salles.

== Works ==
Books

- Feliz Ano Velho (1982)
- Blecaute (1986)
- Ua brari (1990)
- Bala na Agulha (1992)
- As Fêmeas (1994)
- Não És Tu, Brasil (1996)
- Malu de Bicicleta (2002)
- O Homem que Conhecia as Mulheres (2006)
- A Segunda Vez que Te Conheci (2008)
- Marcelo Rubens Paiva - Crônicas para ler na escola (2011)
- E Aí, Comeu? (2012)
- As Verdades Que Ela Não Diz (2012)
- 1 drible, 2 dribles, 3 dribles: manual do pequeno craque cidadão (2014)
- Ainda Estou Aqui (2015)
- Meninos em Fúria (2016)
- O Orangotango Marxista (2018)
- O Homem Ridículo (2019)

Screenplays

- Fiel (2012)
- E Aí, Comeu? (2012)
- Malu de Bicicleta (2013)
- Depois de Tudo (2015)
- Mais Forte que o Mundo (2016)
- Código 12 (2017)
- O Book (2018)
- Casagrande e Seus Demônios (2019)

Stage plays

- 525 Linhas (1989)
- E Aí, Comeu? (Da Boca pra Fora) (1998)
- Mais-que-Imperfeito (2001)
- Closet Show (2003)
- As Mentiras que os Homens Contam (2003)
- No Retrovisor (2003)
- Amo-te (2006)
- A Noite Mais Fria do Ano (2011)
- O Predador Entra na Sala (2012)
- C'est La Vie (2014)
- Amores Urbanos (2016)

== Awards and nominations ==
Year	Award	Category	Nominated work	Result	Refs
2025	Latino Entertainment Journalists’ Film Awards	Adapted Screenplay	I'm Still Here	Nominated	
