= Eunice Paiva =

Brazilian lawyer and human rights activist (1929–2018)

- Paiva during an interview for TV Globo
- Born: Maria Lucrécia Eunice Facciolla; November 7, 1929; São Paulo, Brazil
- Died: December 13, 2018 (aged 89); São Paulo, Brazil
- Education: Universidade Presbiteriana Mackenzie
- Occupation: Lawyer
- Spouse: Rubens Paiva (m. 1952; died 1971)
- Children: 5, including Marcelo Rubens Paiva

Maria Lucrécia Eunice Facciolla Paiva (Brazilian Portuguese: [ewˈnisi ˈpajvɐ]; née Facciolla; November 7, 1929 – December 13, 2018) was a Brazilian lawyer and activist who challenged the Brazilian military dictatorship. After Brazil's military dictatorship caused the disappearance of her husband, the former federal deputy Rubens Paiva, without a word as to his whereabouts, Eunice confronted a dire need to support herself and her five children; she enrolled and graduated from the Faculty of Law at Mackenzie Presbyterian University, then built a career as a prominent advocate for the human rights of the victims of political repression, doggedly campaigned to open the military dictatorship's closed records, and then championed the rights of Brazil's indigenous peoples.

== Biography ==
Eunice Paiva spent her childhood in Brás, a traditional neighborhood of São Paulo, where she lived among the Italian-Brazilian community that came to Brazil at the beginning of the 20th century. Later, she and her family moved to Higienópolis, a more affluent neighborhood. From childhood, she cultivated a love of reading. She graduated in literature from Mackenzie Presbyterian University and spoke fluent French and English. At the age of 23, she married engineer and politician Rubens Beyrodt Paiva, who was involved in labor causes, and with whom she had five children: Vera Sílvia Facciolla Paiva (1953), Maria Eliana Facciolla Paiva (1955), Ana Lúcia Facciolla Paiva (1957), Marcelo Rubens Paiva (1959) and Maria Beatriz Facciolla Paiva (1960). She was friends with great writers such as Lygia Fagundes Telles, Antônio Callado and Haroldo de Campos.

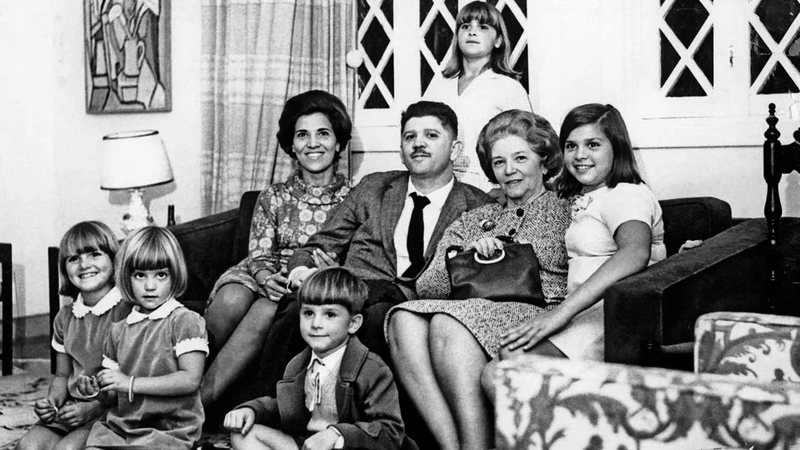
Paiva family in the 1970s

Living on oceanfront Avenida Delfim Moreira in Rio de Janeiro's Leblon neighborhood, Eunice, Rubens and their children enjoyed a comfortable life. On January 20, 1971, however, six men claiming to belong to the Brazilian Air Force invaded and occupied their residence, seizing Rubens and taking him to the cellar of the intelligence agency, DOI-CODI, where the military dictatorship then ruling Brazil tortured him to death, killing him one day after he was seized. After her husband's death (which was unknown to her), Eunice and her daughter Eliana were also then seized (Eunice was imprisoned without charge and interrogated for 12 days; Eliana was released after one day). With her husband disappeared, Eunice was unable to support her family in Rio de Janeiro; she returned with her children to São Paulo where, in 1973, she re-enrolled at Mackenzie University to study law, graduating at the age of 47.

=== Career ===
Indefatigable in her search for information on her husband's whereabouts, Eunice Paiva led campaigns to open archives on the victims of the military regime, becoming a symbol of the fight against the dictatorship. Due to her determination and criticism of the dictatorship, she and her children were watched by military agents from 1971 until 1984, as evidenced in documents from the National Intelligence Service (SNI) that were made public in 2013. She became one of the greatest advocates lobbying for the enactment of Law 9.140/95, which acknowledged the deaths of people disappeared for their political activities during the military dictatorship. She was invited to attend the ceremony where President Fernando Henrique Cardoso signed the law, the only relative of a disappeared person present at the event.

In 1996, after 25 years, Eunice succeeded in compelling the Brazilian government to officially issue Rubens Paiva's death certificate. In 2025, years after Eunice's death, the Brazilian state corrected Rubens' death certificate to accurately state that he died violently at the hands of the State.

In her law career, Eunice Paiva advocated for the rights of indigenous people in Brazil, documenting and bringing actions to end the violence and illegal land expropriation committed against indigenous people. In October 1983, she and Manuela Carneiro da Cunha wrote "Defend the Pataxós," an influential opinion piece published in prominent São Paulo newspaper Folha de S. Paulo that shined a spotlight on the struggles of Brazil's indigenous peoples and served as a model for indigenous peoples elsewhere. In 1987, together with other partners, she founded the Institute of Anthropology and the Environment (IAMA), a non-governmental organization that worked until 2001 to defend the autonomy of indigenous peoples. In 1988, she was a consultant to indigenous agendas to the National Constituent Assembly, which promulgated a new Constitution of Brazil to replace the one abused by the military dictatorship.

=== Personal life and death ===
Paiva was Catholic and attended Mass on Sundays.

She died on December 13, 2018, at the age of 89, in the city of São Paulo, after living for 15 years with Alzheimer's disease.

== In popular culture ==
Released in 1978, the documentary Eunice, Clarice, Thereza, directed by Joatan Berbel, tells the story of three widows of political prisoners: Clarice Herzog (widow of journalist Vladimir Herzog); Thereza Fiel (widow of worker Manoel Fiel Filho); and Eunice Paiva. These three women were united against the military dictatorship and its repression.

In the 1980s, Eunice Paiva was portrayed by Denise Del Vecchio in the Brazilian play Feliz Ano Velho, directed by Paulo Betti. The character Lúcia, played by Eva Wilma in the 1987 Brazilian drama film Feliz Ano Velho, was also a portrayal of Eunice Paiva. Heloísa Périssé portrays Eunice Paiva in the 2026 musical play Feliz Ano Velho - O Musical. All these works were based on the 1982 autobiographical novel Feliz Ano Velho, written by Eunice Paiva's son Marcelo Rubens Paiva.

Published in 2015, the autobiographical novel Ainda Estou Aqui, also written by Marcelo Rubens Paiva, deals with the life of Eunice Paiva and draws parallels between her story and the period of dictatorship in Brazil. The book won third place in the Jabuti Prize in the reader nomination category and was nominated for the Oceanos awards, as well as being included in the list of the best books of 2015 by O Globo newspaper.

The book Ainda Estou Aqui has been adapted for the cinema. Directed by Walter Salles and starring Fernanda Torres as Eunice in her adulthood, Fernanda Montenegro as an elderly Eunice in her last years of life and Selton Mello as Rubens Paiva, I'm Still Here was released in Brazil on November 7, 2024. The film won Best Screenplay at the 2024 Venice Film Festival, and was chosen to represent Brazil at the 97th Academy Awards for Best International Feature Film, which it won, becoming the first Brazilian victory in a category. For her portrayal of Paiva, Torres won the Golden Globe Award for Best Actress in a Motion Picture – Drama at the 82nd Golden Globe Awards and was nominated for the Academy Award for Best Actress category at the 97th ceremony.
