= Ainda Estou Aqui =

2015 Brazilian memoir by Marcelo Rubens Paiva

- Author: Marcelo Rubens Paiva
- Language: Portuguese
- Genre: Biography
- Publisher: Alfaguara
- Publication date: 4 August 2015 (1st edition)
- Publication place: Brazil
- Pages: 295

Ainda Estou Aqui is a memoir by Marcelo Rubens Paiva. It was published on 4 August 2015 by Alfaguara, a subsidiary of the Brazilian publisher Companhia das Letras.

== Synopsis ==
The autobiographical work deals with the author's delicate relationship with his mother, Eunice, and is marked by the passage of time. At the beginning, we follow Eunice Paiva in her old age and with signs of Alzheimer's disease. Throughout, the reader discovers details about the author's childhood and family. Another subject addressed is his father, federal deputy Rubens Paiva. Marcelo Paiva shows affection for his family and addresses the issues surrounding the military dictatorship in Brazil and his father's death.

== Critical reception ==
In his blog on the G1 portal, the journalist Zeca Camargo gave the book a positive review and told readers to "stop what you're doing and go read Marcelo's new book". He wrote: "It's pure intelligence, sensitivity and provocation. It's also a book—a somewhat outmoded artifact, and immensely less popular than Twitter, which with its 140 characters (if there are people who use "all that" to express their unhappiness and project their bile these days). But it's exactly a book like this that makes the difference."

In her column in Veja Rio magazine, Fernanda Torres called the book a "Christmas present" and wrote, "In times of political blackout, with the country held hostage by the evil forces that run Congress, Ainda Estou Aqui comes to remind us that people like Eunice exist, existed, make and made a difference." Torres was cast as Eunice in the 2024 film I'm Still Here and received an Academy Award nomination for Best Actress for her performance.

In the year of its release, journalist and sociologist Maria Carolina Maia, writing for the national edition of Veja, called the book a must-read, writing, "Ainda Estou Aqui can be considered an easy read, in the sense of being fluid. But it is at the same time a difficult read to undertake. And necessary. Very necessary. Write it down for your Secret Santa: I'm Still Here is one of the best releases of 2015."

== Adaptation ==
The book has been adapted into a movie. Directed by Walter Salles and starring Fernanda Torres, I'm Still Here was released in Brazil on 7 November 2024.

The film won Best Screenplay at the 81st Venice Film Festival. At the Golden Globes, Fernanda Torres secured the Golden Globe for Best Actress. At the 97th Oscars the feature was nominated for three categories, winning Best International Film, the first Brazilian film to win an Oscar.

== See also ==
- Eunice Paiva
- Rubens Paiva
- Marcelo Rubens Paiva
- I'm Still Here
