= List of awards and nominations received by Walter Salles =

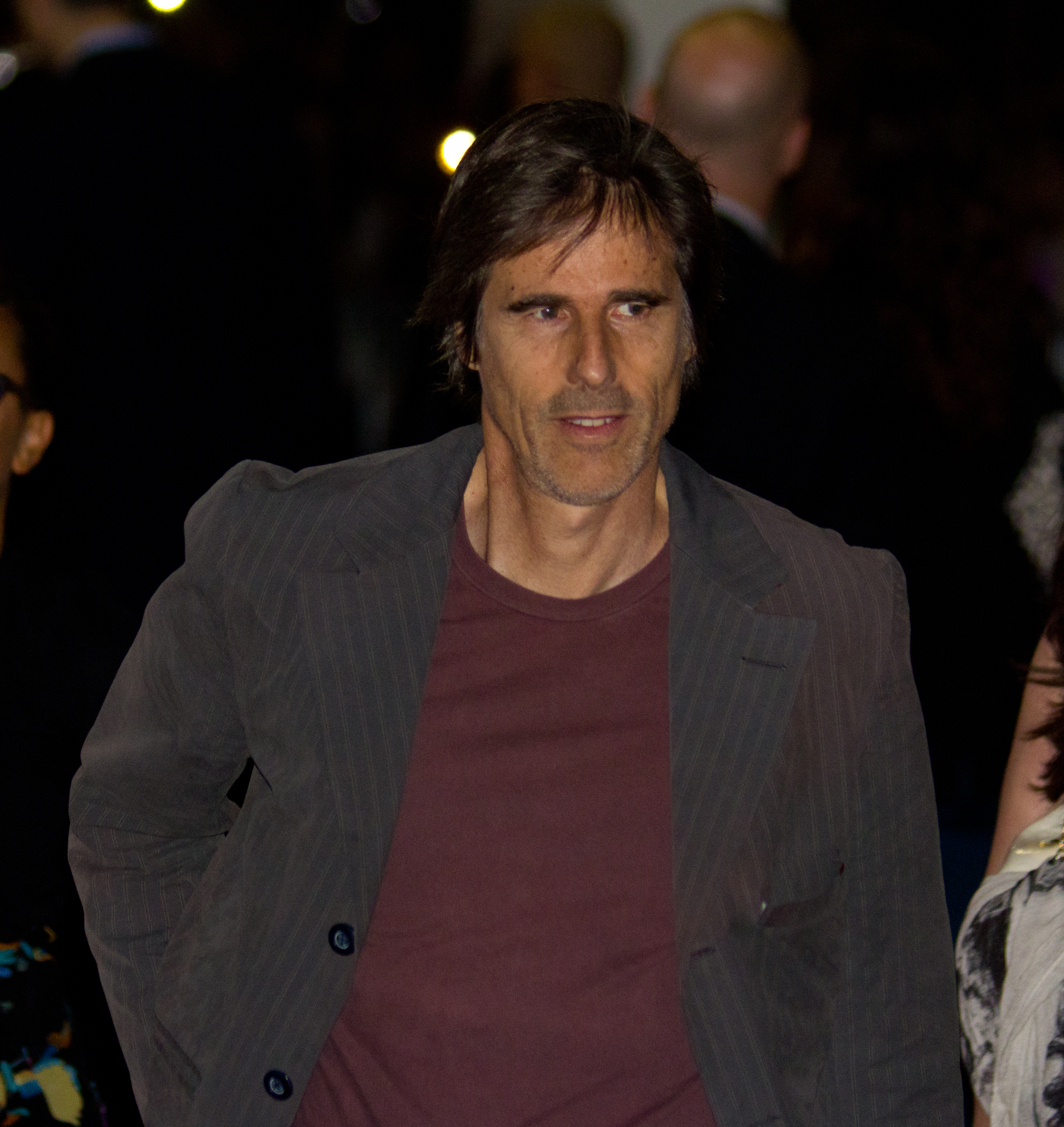
Salles at the 2012 Toronto International Film Festival showing of On the Road.

Walter Salles is a Brazilian filmmaker and producer. This is a list of awards and nominations for Salles.

== Major awards ==
On October 18, 2025, Salles received the Academy Museum of Motion Pictures Luminary Award “given to an artist whose singular contributions have expanded the creative possibilities of cinema.”

=== Academy Awards ===
Year	Category	Nominated work	Result	Ref.
2025	Best International Feature Film	I'm Still Here	Accepted	

=== Berlin International Film Festival ===
Year	Category	Nominated work	Result	Ref.
1998	Golden Bear	Central Station	Won	
1998	Prize of the Ecumenical Jury	Central Station	Won	

=== BAFTA Awards ===
Year	Category	Nominated work	Result	Ref.
British Academy Film Awards
1999	Best Film Not in the English Language	Central Station	Accepted	

=== Cannes Film Festival ===
Year	Category	Nominated work	Result	Ref.
2004	Palme d'Or	The Motorcycle Diaries	Nominated	
2004	François Chalais Prize	The Motorcycle Diaries	Won	
2004	Prize of the Ecumenical Jury	The Motorcycle Diaries	Won	
2008	Palme d'Or	Linha de Passe	Nominated	
2012	Palme d'Or	On the Road	Nominated	

=== César Awards ===
Year	Category	Nominated work	Result	Ref.
1999	Best Foreign Film	Central Station	Nominated	
2005	Best Foreign Film	The Motorcycle Diaries	Nominated	

=== Golden Globe Awards ===
Year	Category	Nominated work	Result	Ref.
1999	Best Foreign Language Film	Central Station	Won	
2002	Best Foreign Language Film	Behind the Sun	Nominated	
2005	Best Foreign Language Film	The Motorcycle Diaries	Nominated	
2025	Best Foreign Language Film	I'm Still Here	Nominated	

=== Venice Film Festival ===
Year	Category	Nominated work	Result	Ref.
2001	Golden Lion	Behind the Sun	Nominated	
2001	Leoncino d'Oro	Behind the Sun	Won	
2024	Golden Lion	I'm Still Here	Nominated	
2024	Green Drop Award	I'm Still Here	Won	
2024	SIGNIS Award	I'm Still Here	Won	

== Critics awards ==
Organizations	Year	Category	Work	Result	Ref.
Argentine Film Critics Association	2000	Best Foreign Film	Central Station	Won	
Argentine Film Critics Association	2005	Best Director	The Motorcycle Diaries	Nominated	
Argentine Film Critics Association	2005	Best Film	The Motorcycle Diaries	Nominated	
Latino Entertainment Journalists Association	2025	Best Director	I'm Still Here	Nominated	
London Film Critics' Circle	2004	Director of the Year	The Motorcycle Diaries	Nominated	
Los Angeles Film Critics Association	1998	Best Foreign Language Film	Central Station	Runner-up	
Los Angeles Film Critics Association	2004	Best Foreign Language Film	The Motorcycle Diaries	Runner-up	
Online Film Critics Society	1998	Best Foreign Language Film	Central Station	Nominated	
São Paulo Art Critics Association	1999	Best Director	Central Station	Won	
São Paulo Art Critics Association	1999	Best Film	Central Station	Won	
São Paulo Art Critics Association	2009	Best Film	Linha de Passe	Won	
São Paulo Art Critics Association	2025	Best Film	I'm Still Here	Won	

== Miscellaneous awards ==
Organizations	Year	Category	Work	Result	Ref.
Ariel Awards	2000	Best Ibero-American Film	Midnight	Won	
BFI London Film Festival	2015	Grierson Award – Documentary Competition	Jia Zhangke, A Guy from Fenyang	Nominated	
David di Donatello	1999	Best Foreign Film	Central Station	Nominated	
Directors Guild of Great Britain	2005	Outstanding Directorial Achievement in a Foreign Language Film	The Motorcycle Diaries	Won	
Cinema Brazil Grand Prize	2000	Best Film	Midnight	Nominated	
Cinema Brazil Grand Prize	2009	Best Film	Linha de Passe	Nominated	
European Film Awards	2004	Non-European Film – Prix Screen International	The Motorcycle Diaries	Nominated	
Goya Awards	2025	Best Ibero-American Film	I'm Still Here	Won	
Independent Spirit Awards	1999	Best Foreign Film	Central Station	Nominated	
Independent Spirit Awards	2005	Best Director	The Motorcycle Diaries	Nominated	
International Film Festival Rotterdam	2025	Audience Award	I'm Still Here	Won	
National Board of Review	1998	Best Foreign Film	Central Station	Won	
Norwegian International Film Festival	2004	Audience Award	The Motorcycle Diaries	Won	
Palm Springs International Film Festival	2025	FIPRESCI Prize for Best International Film	I'm Still Here	Won	
Pingyao International Film Festival	2024	Crouching Tiger Hidden Dragon East-West Award	I'm Still Here	Won	
Satellite Awards	1999	Best Foreign Language Film	Central Station	Won	
Sydney Film Festival	2012	Sydney Film Prize	On the Road	Nominated	
