= Federal Bank Heist =

2011 film directed by Marcos Paulo

- Directed by: Marcos Paulo Simões
- Written by: Renê Belmonte
- Produced by: Walkiria Barbosa; Vilma Lustosa; Marcos Didonet
- Starring: Eriberto Leão; Hermila Guedes; Milhem Cortaz; Lima Duarte; Giulia Gam
- Cinematography: José Roberto Eliezer
- Music by: André Moraes
- Production company: Total Entertainment
- Release date: July 22, 2011
- Country: Brazil
- Language: Portuguese

Federal Bank Heist (Portuguese: Assalto ao Banco Central) is a 2011 Brazilian thriller film directed and produced by Marcos Paulo Simões, starring Milhem Cortaz, Hermila Guedes, Eriberto Leão and Lima Duarte. It is based on the 2005 Banco Central burglary at Fortaleza.

== Plot ==
In 2005, high-ranked criminal Barão (Milhem Cortaz) and his wife Carla (Hermila Guedes) are planning the heist that inspired the film - they need to dig a tunnel linking a house to the Banco Central's vault in Fortaleza, where they'll steal millions of reals. To accomplish their objective, they assemble a group of eight other criminals: Mineiro (Eriberto Leão), the couple's right-hand and chief of the band when Barão's not around; Doutor (Tonico Pereira), a communist civil engineer; Tatu (Gero Camilo), the chief of the brickies; Caetano (Fábio Lago), Saulo (Créo Kellab), Décio (Juliano Cazarré) and Firmino (Cadu Fávero), all brickies; and Léo (Heitor Martinez), head of security and an ex-police officer, expelled due to corruption.

Before the group is assembled, Barão obtains vital security information from Moacir (Antônio Abujamra) and uses it later to plan the group's moves once inside the vault. Barão also arranges an old house as a HQ for his men and a second one under which the hole will be dug. He also settles a fake artificial turf company to cover the group's operations. Carla's evangelical brother Devanildo (Vinícius de Oliveira) later joins the group as the company's secretary. Though initially unaware of the true intentions of his colleagues, he later secretly sneaks down into the tunnel and discovers the gang's plan. He asks Barão to be allowed to leave but is forced to stay.

Alternating with these scenes, sheriff Amorim (Lima Duarte) and his assistant Telma (Giulia Gam) are show investigating the heist. They arrive at the Banco Central building and follow the tunnel back to the fake company. Amorim is also shown interrogating some members of the group that were later arrested.

Back to the time before the heist, the gang finally reaches the vault on August 6, 2005, after three months. Barão, Carla and Mineiro collect the cash and the group moves the R$164 million to their HQ, where each criminal earns R$2 million. Saulo, inspired by Doutor's communist ideals, protests against the unequal division of the money, but is shot dead by Barão. In order to bait the police away from his whereabouts, Barão has a large sum of money planted inside a car that is later loaded on an autorack headed for São Paulo. Police stop the autorack and arrest its driver, believing all the money was sent to São Paulo.

Later on, Léo is visited by his ex-colleagues from the police Robson (Marcello Gonçalves) and Vágner (Jorge Medina). They found out about his sudden enrichment and demand him to put them inside the scheme. Léo reluctantly admits he was part of the heist and agrees to sell his colleagues out. They start with Décio, whom Léo had some disagreements before the heist. Décio refuses to reveal the location of his sum and is shot dead by Léo. Some kids later sneak into Décio's yard and discover his cut buried there. Amorim arrives afterwards to investigate.

Meanwhile, Carla and Barão have an argument over whether or not they should start spending their money - Barão wants to lie low for a while until police heat is lowered. Unhappy with Barão's attitude, she decides to leave him and moves to the group's former HQ, where Mineiro now lives. Amorim pays Caetano a visit after he tries to buy a mansion with R$1 million worth of old R$50 bills - the same type of bills stolen during the heist. Caetano inadvertently reveals his connection to the heist and ends up cuffed by Amorim's men.

Devanildo reveals to his priest (Milton Gonçalves) that he earned a lot of money after working with people that "did not follow the Lord's words". The priest convinces him to donate all the money to the church, but Devanildo decides to keep a part of it for him. When returning from the church, he drops some bills and reacts strangely when a police officer picks it up for him, ending up arrested and later interrogated by Amorim. Amorim and Telma also arrest Firmino, mistaking him for Barão. Firmino initially denies his identity as Barão, but Barão's lawyer bribes him into assuming Barão's identity to lower Barão's heat.

Mineiro calls the remaining group members and arranges a meeting so they can discuss their next steps now that the gang leader is supposedly in jail. One night, Barão surprises Mineiro on his way back home and confronts him over dating his wife Carla after being informed by Martinho (Cássio Gabus Mendes), a detective he hired to keep watch of every gang member after the heist. Barão easily beats Mineiro and holds him at gunpoint, ultimately sparing him and stating that nobody will care about his death. Léo informs his police friends about the meeting and they plan to have the rest of the group taken out. However, Amorim and Telma taped Mineiro's phone and are also aware of the meeting. They assemble a group of special forces and break into the old HQ, arresting Mineiro, Léo, Tatu and Carla. Léo's police friends just watch before they can escape.

Upon interrogating Firmino, Amorim is interrupted and informed of his compulsory retirement. Disappointed with the way crime is handled in then current times, he greets a recently promoted Telma as she announces she will take his place. Telma then escorts Carla to the back of a police SUV while Amorim watches. Barão infiltrates himself among the photographers and smiles at Carla, who smiles back at him in front of a confused Amorim.

== Reception ==
According to Fox Filmes Brasil, which distributed the film in Brazil, Assalto ao Banco Central had a successful premiere, with more than 325,000 spectators during its first weekend.

Receptions to the film have so far been negative. Mauricio Stycer, from UOL Cinema, disliked what he called "a rare action movie without action".

== Cast ==
- Milhem Cortaz - Barão
- Eriberto Leão - Mineiro
- Hermila Guedes - Carla
- Lima Duarte - Delegado Amorim
- Giulia Gam - Telma Monteiro
- Tonico Pereira - Doutor
- Gero Camilo - Tatu
- Vinícius de Oliveira - Devanildo
- Heitor Martinez - Léo
- Cadu Fávero - Firmino
- Fábio Lago - Caetano
- Juliano Cazarré - Décio
- Créo Kellab - Saulo
- Cássio Gabus Mendes - Martinho
- Ilva Niño - Marisa Mello
