= Vazante (film) =

2017 film directed by Daniela Thomas

- Film poster
- Directed by: Daniela Thomas
- Written by: Daniela Thomas; Beto Amaral
- Produced by: Beto Amaral; Maria Ionescu; Sara Silveira
- Starring: Adriano Carvalho; Luana Nastas
- Cinematography: Inti Briones
- Edited by: Estevan Schilling; Tiago Marinho
- Production companies: Cisma Produções; Dezenove Som e Imagem; Ukbar Filmes
- Release date: 10 February 2017 (Berlin)
- Running time: 116 minutes
- Countries: Brazil; Portugal
- Language: Portuguese

Vazante is a Brazilian-Portuguese historical drama adventure film about slavery in 1820s Brazil, directed by Daniela Thomas. The film premiered in the Panorama section of the 67th Berlin International Film Festival.

== Plot ==
In 1821, a slave trader and miner, Antonio, returns home with imported African slaves only to discover his wife has died in childbirth along with their son. In grief, he abandons his home and heads to the wild. As the mines have dried up and there is no other work or chance of money, Antonio's brother-in-law, Batholomeu, decides to take the slaves to be sold himself. On the journey, the slaves manage to overpower Batholomeu and free themselves from their coffle. However, as the leader of the group is fleeing, he comes across Antonio who is close to death, and saves him by returning him to his family.

Antonio re-enslaves the man who saved him. He remains despondent until he is approached by a free black man, Jeremias, who offers to turn his land into a profitable farm. During the brush's burning, Antonio briefly glimpses Beatriz, Batholomeu's youngest daughter who was attracted by the fire. Though she has not yet begun to menstruate, he decides to marry her, much to the distress of her parents who feel they cannot say no due to Batholomeu's loss of the slaves and their financial difficulties.

Antonio does not consummate the marriage as Beatriz is too young, and shortly after their wedding, leaves to obtain grains and other goods. Meanwhile, Beatriz's family decides to leave for Serro.

Lonely and bored, Beatriz befriends some of the children enslaved by her husband, including Virgílio, a boy her age. While out playing they accidentally discover the leader of the African slaves who saved Antonio, dead. The death bonds them together, and while out in the fields together, they are found by Jeremias and are bound and dragged back to the farm. Jeremias flees and the rest of the slaves conspire to keep the incident a secret, shortly after Beatriz begins to menstruate for the first time.

Antonio returns home. After learning that Beatriz has begun menstruating, he initially puts off consummating their marriage and rapes Virgílio's mother, Feliciana. However, he soon begins raping Beatriz. Feliciana soon grows pregnant as does Beatriz. Upon learning of Beatriz's pregnancy, Antonio swears he will never leave her again. Beatriz tries to run away but is caught and brought back by Antonio.

Beatriz goes into labour. Antonio leaves and when he returns discovers that Beatriz has birthed a black child, fathered by Virgílio. In a rage, Antonio murders Beatriz's child and grandmother as well as Virgílio and Feliciana.

As Antonio warns the other slaves not to touch their bodies Beatriz comes out of the house and retrieves Feliciana and Antonio's crying child and begins to suckle the baby.

== Cast ==
- Adriano Carvalho as Antonio
- Luana Nastas as Beatriz
- Sandra Corveloni as Dona Ondina
- Juliana Carneiro de Cunha as Dona Zizinha
- Maria Helena Dias as Domingas
- Roberto Audio as Batholomeu
- Jai Baptista as Feliciana
- Toumani Kouyaté as Lider
- Vinícius dos Anjos as Virgílio
- Fabrício Boliveira as Jeremias
- Adilson Maghá as Porfírio
- Geisa Costa as Joana

== Release ==
Vazante premiered in the Panorama section of the 67th Berlin International Film Festival.

== Reception ==
As of June 2020, the film holds an 85% approval rating on review aggregator Rotten Tomatoes, based on 34 reviews with an average rating of 7.16/10. On Metacritic, the film has a weighted average score of 68 out of 100, based on 12 critics, indicating "generally favorable reviews".

The Hollywood Reporter described the film as 'a hushed opera that builds to a shattering climax.'
