= Vinícius de Oliveira =

Brazilian actor

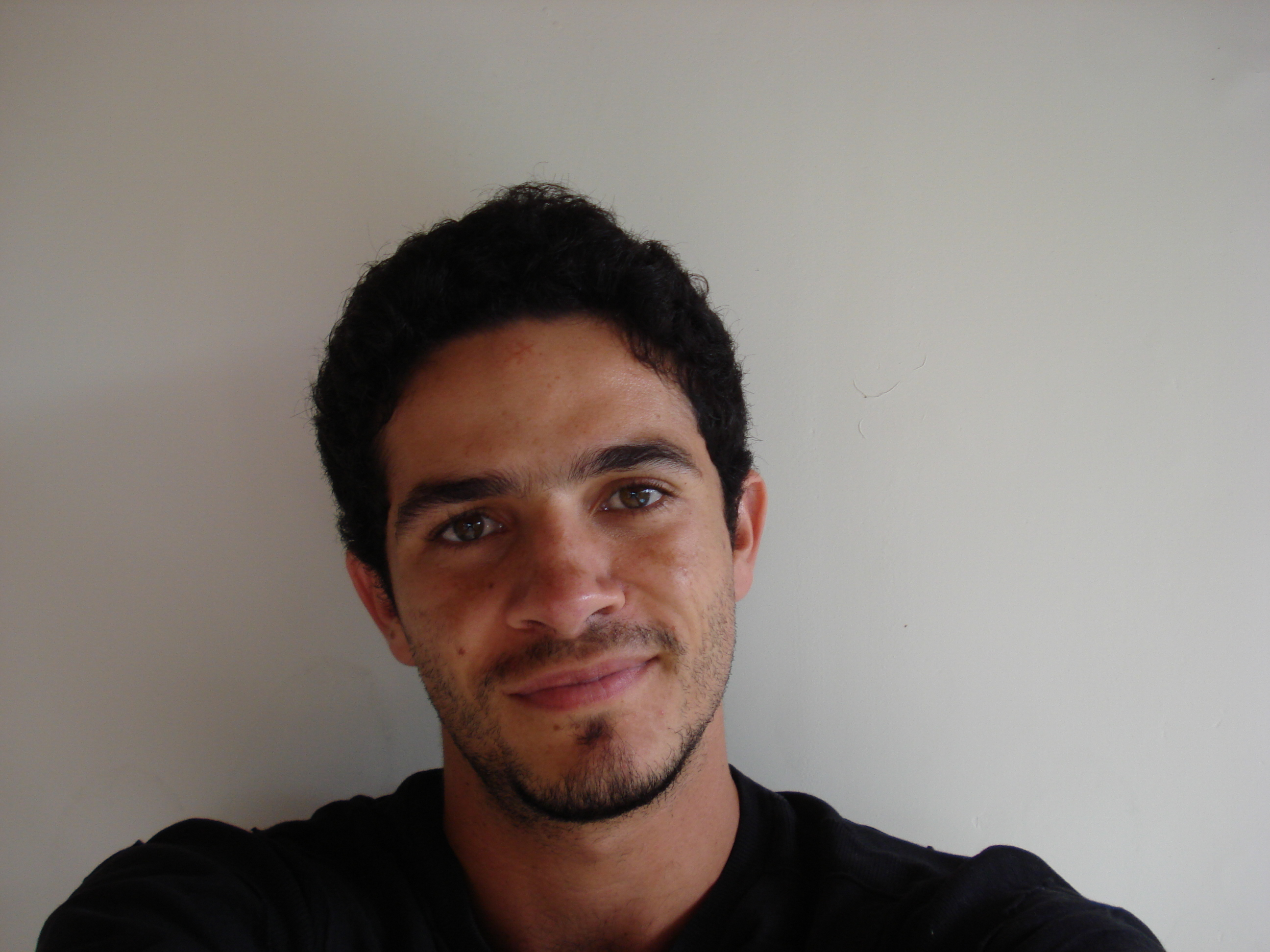
- Vinícius de Oliveira, 2009
- Born: July 18, 1985 (age 40); Bonsucesso, Rio de Janeiro, Brazil
- Occupation: Actor
- Website: Official website

Vinícius de Oliveira (born July 18, 1985) is a Brazilian actor.

== Biography ==
Vinícius Campos de Oliveira was born on July 18, 1985, in Bonsucesso, Rio de Janeiro. He was raised by his mother, Juçara, along with an older brother and two younger sisters; Vinícius and his brother would shine shoes to make ends meet, and it was while shining shoes that de Oliveira met director Walter Salles, who would invite him to a screen test for a role in his upcoming film.

== Career ==
In 1997, de Oliveira selected from among almost 2,000 candidates to play the role of Josué in Salles’ Central Station alongside Fernanda Montenegro. The film was critically acclaimed and launched de Oliveira into a career as a child actor, presenting such programs as Alô Vídeo Escola and Que bicho é esse? on Canal Futura between June 1998 and March 2000. He also starred in the telenovela Suave Veneno on Globo TV and reunited with Walter Salles to perform in the film Behind the Sun during this period.

De Oliveira began to break into theater around this time, performing in a production of Carlos Drummond de Andrade’s Jovem Drummond, which debuted in November 2000 and toured the country, and Marcus Vinícius Faustini's São Paulo production of They Do Not Wear Black-Tie between March and May 2001. He appeared in the Caixa Preta Group’s production of Anamaria Nunes’ The Trianon Generation in 2004.

In 2008, de Oliveira starred in Walter Salles and Daniela Thomas’ Linha de Passe, which was nominated for the Palme d’Or at that year’s Cannes Film Festival. He also had a role in the 2015 film Neon Bull, which was highly acclaimed and won the Grand Prix at the 31st Warsaw International Film Festival and the Horizons Special Jury Prize at the 72nd Venice International Film Festival.

== Filmography ==
=== Film ===
Year	Title	Role	Notes
1998	Central Station	Josué Fontenele de Paiva	
2001	Behind the Sun	Diogo	
2003	Bala Perdida	Boyfriend	Short-film
2008	Se Nada Mais Der Certo	Burglar	
2008	Linha de Passe	Dario	
2011	Fala Sério!	Jonas	
2011	Fca Carla	Doctor Hugo	
2011	Federal Bank Heist	Devanildo	
2011	The Hour and Turn of Augusto Matraga	Josias	
2013	As Órbitas	Rafael	Short-film
2013	Sem Alma	Crom	Short-film
2014	Se Deus Vier, que Venha Armado	Damião	
2014	Quando Ladram os Cães	Motoboy	Short-film
2015	Neon Bull	Júnior	
2016	Demônia	Rildo	Short-film
2020	Volta Seca	Inácio	Short-film
2021	Dente por Dente	Palhuca	

=== Television ===
Year	Title	Role	Notes
1999	Suave Veneno	Adelmo de Alencar Júnior	
2004	Carga Pesada	Meleca	Episode: "Homem não Chora"
2010	Nosso Querido Trapalhão	Renato Aragão	End of year special
2014	O Rebu	Eduardo "Edu" Muniz	
2015	Santo Forte	João	
2015	A Regra do Jogo	Genivaldo	
2016	Unidade Básica	Malaquias	Season 1
2017	Sob Pressão	Elaine's boyfriend	Episode: "July 25th"
2018	Magnífica 70	Saulo	Season 3
2019	Sintonia	Éder	
2019	Segunda Chamada	Pedro Torres Soares	Season 1
2019	Irmãos Freitas	Gilvan	
2020–23	Um dia Qualquer	Maciel	
2022	Não Foi Minha Culpa	Eduardo "Dudu"	Episode: "Maria do Carmo"
