= Arthur Cohn =

Swiss film producer (1927–2025)

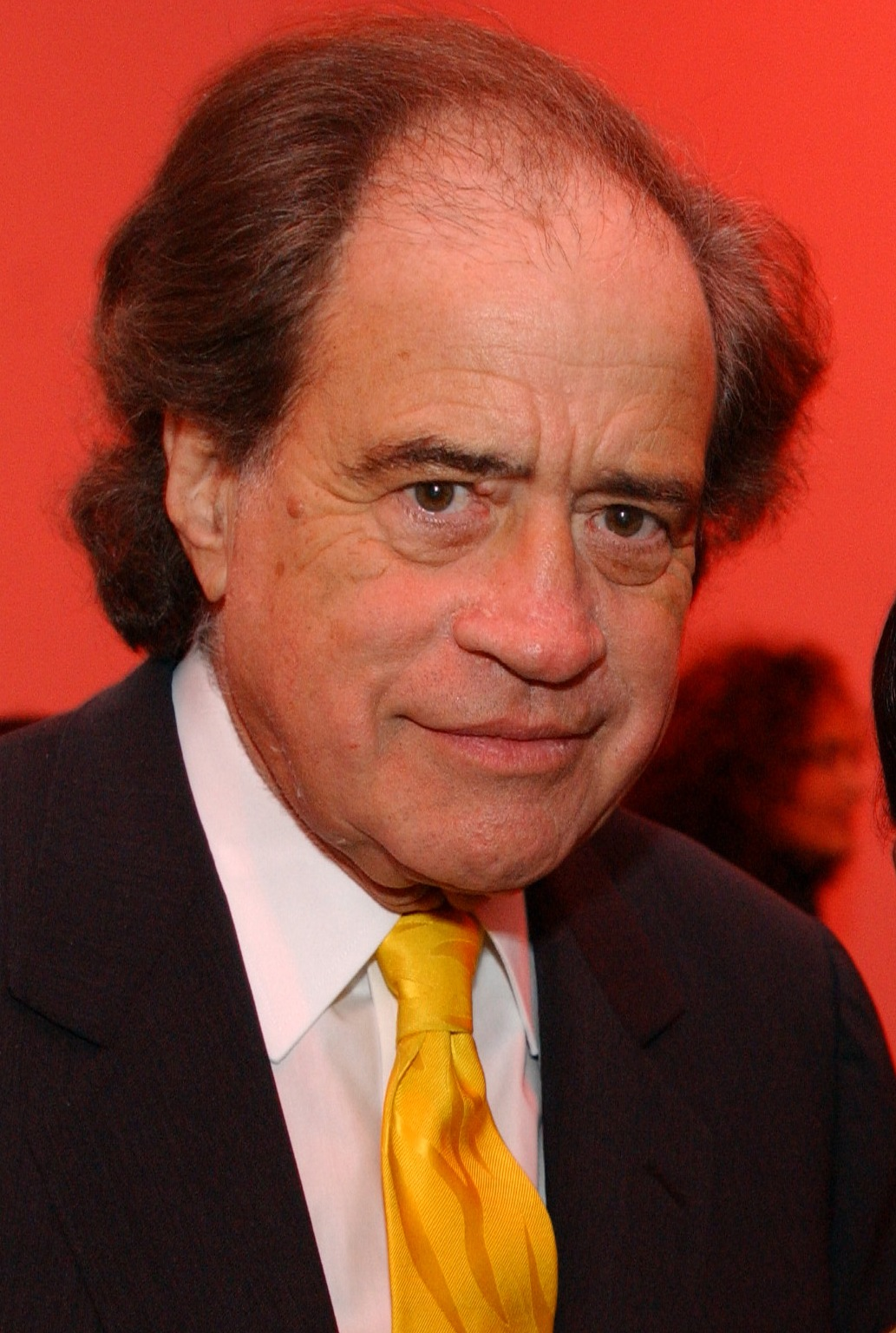
- Born: 4 February 1927; Basel, Switzerland
- Died: 12 December 2025 (aged 98); Jerusalem, Israel
- Occupation: Film producer
- Years active: 1959–2025
- Relatives: Arthur Cohn (grandfather)

Arthur Cohn (4 February 1927 – 12 December 2025) was a Swiss film producer and a multiple Academy Award winner.

== Life and career ==
Cohn was born to a Jewish family, the son of Marcus Cohn, a lawyer who saved the lives of many Jews from within Switzerland during World War II and leader of the Swiss Zionist movement. Cohn's mother, Rose Cohn-Galewski, was a Jewish-German poet from Berlin. Cohn's grandfather, Arthur Cohn, was the first chief rabbi of Basel. After completing high school in Basel, Cohn became a journalist and a reporter for Swiss Radio, covering the Middle East as well as soccer and ice hockey games. He shifted from journalist writing to script writing, but soon found his passion in film production.

Six of his films won the Academy Award, three in the category of Best Foreign Language Film and three in the category of Best Documentary Feature. Cohn was awarded a Star on the Hollywood Walk of Fame in 1992, the Ordre des Arts et des Lettres by the French Minister of Culture in 1995, the Humanitarian Award by the National Board of Review in 2001, the Guardian of Zion Award in 2004, as well as the UNESCO Award in 2005. He was bestowed with multiple honorary degrees including from Boston University (1998), Yeshiva University (2001), the University of Basel (2006), and Bar-Ilan University (2021). Cohn received Lifetime Achievement Awards from the Chicago International Film Festival (1992), the Jerusalem Film Festival (1995), the Shanghai International Film Festival (1999), the Haifa International Film Festival (2016) as well as from the Cinema for Peace Foundation (2019).

Cohn divided his time between Basel and Los Angeles and was regarded as a hands-on producer who was strongly involved with the development of the script until the final touches of the editing process. For decades he was assisted by Lillian Birnbaum (Paris) and Pierre Rothschild (Zurich). Cohn's films have been shown at many retrospectives around the world.

His best-known fictional film is The Garden of the Finzi-Continis (1970, directed by Vittorio De Sica). He also produced films by Kevin Macdonald (One Day in September) and Walter Salles (Central Station, Behind the Sun).

== Death ==
Arthur Cohn died in Jerusalem on 12 December 2025, at the age of 98.

== Filmography ==
Year	Film	Notes
1961	Sky Above and Mud Beneath (Le Ciel et la Boue)	Academy Award for Best Documentary Feature Film
1963	Mit Karl May im Orient	TV series
1964	Paris Secret	Documentary feature film
1967	Woman Times Seven (Sette volte donna)	
1968	Clown	Short film
1968	A Place for Lovers (Amanti)	
1970	Sunflower (I Girasoli)	
1970	The Garden of the Finzi-Continis (Il Giardino dei Finzi-Contini)	Academy Award for Best Foreign Language Film
1972	We'll Call Him Andrew (Lo chiameremo Andrea)	
1973	A Brief Vacation (Una breve vacanza)	David di Donatello Award Winner
1976	Black and White in Color (La Victoire en chantant)	Academy Award for Best Foreign Language Film
1979	Adoption (L'adoption)	
1981	The Yellow Star – The Persecution of the Jews in Europe 1933-45 (Der Gelbe Stern)	Academy Award Nominee for Best Documentary Feature Film
1984	Love on the Ground (L'Amour par Terre)	
1984	Dangerous Moves (La Diagonale du Fou)	Academy Award for Best Foreign Language Film
1990	American Dream	Academy Award for Best Documentary Feature Film
1991	November Days	Documentary film
1995	Two Bits	
1997	White Lies	
1998	Central Station (Central do Brasil)	Academy Award Nominee for Best Foreign Language Film and Best Actress in a Leading Role and Golden Globe Award for Best Non-English Language Film
1999	Children of the Night	Documentary short film
1999	One Day in September	Academy Award for Best Documentary Feature Film
2001	Behind the Sun (Abril Despedaçado)	Golden Globe Nominee for Best Non-English Language Film
2004	The Chorus (Les Choristes)	Academy Award Nominee for Best Foreign Language Film and for Best Original Song
2008	The Yellow Handkerchief	
2008	The Children of Huang Shi	
2009	Feathered Fan and Silken Ribbon	Documentary film
2012	Russian Disco	
2018	The Etruscan Smile	
