= Luana Tanaka =

Brazilian actress (born 1989)

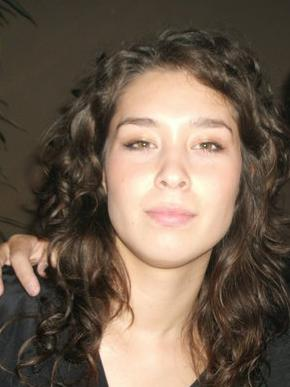
- Tanaka in 2012
- Born: Luana Tanaka Ostan; October 11, 1989 (age 36); São Paulo, Brazil
- Other name: La Gitanita de Patraix
- Occupation: Actress
- Years active: 2006–present

Luana Tanaka Ostan (born October 11, 1989) is a Brazilian actress.

== Biography ==
Luana Tanaka was born in São Paulo, Brazil. She is of Japanese, French and Belgian descent.

She gained fame after playing the part of the dekasegi Keiko, in the television series Morde & Assopra. In 2013, she participated in the series Sessão de Terapia, giving life to Lia. In 2014, she played Elda, expert and best friend of Vera Luana Piovani, in TV show Dupla Identidade created by Glória Perez.

In 2016, she was cast as Ágata in the Netflix original series 3%. She most recently appeared in the 2020 series Omniscient_(TV_series) on Netflix.

== Filmography ==
=== Television ===
Year	Title	Character	Notes
2010	Araguaia	Dra. Murakami	Guest appearance
2011	Morde & Assopra	Keiko Tanaka	
2013	Sessão de Terapia	Lia Braga	Guest appearance
2014	Dupla Identidade	Elda	
2016	A Garota da Moto	Fang	
2017	Novo Mundo	Miss Liu	
2020	Omniscient	Olivia Okamoto	
2025	Dona de Mim	Gisele	

=== Cinema ===
Year	Title	Character
2010	Café con Pienas	Chii
2010	Inside Car SP	Rebeca
2014	Superpai	Scheila

=== Theater ===
Year	Title	Character
2006	Asas da Mente	Ser do Inconsciente
2009	Justine	Senhora du Buisson
2009	A Filosofia na Alcova	Eugénie
2012	Biodramas	
2013	L.E.R	
2015	Bruto	

=== Clip ===
Year	Title
2011	Coração Coragem

=== Streaming ===
Year	Title	Character
2016	3%	Ágata
2020	Onisciente	Olívia Okamoto
