= Life Somewhere Else =

1995 film

- Directed by: Walter Salles
- Written by: Frans Krajcberg; Walter Salles
- Produced by: Mini Kerti
- Starring: Frans Krajcberg; Maria do Socorro Nobre
- Cinematography: Walter Carvalho
- Edited by: Felipe Lacerda; Walter Salles
- Release date: 1995
- Running time: 23 minutes
- Country: Brazil
- Language: Portuguese

Life Somewhere Else (Portuguese: Socorro Nobre) is a 1995 short documentary film directed by Walter Salles. It tells the story of Maria do Socorro Nobre, a Brazilian woman who, while serving a 20-year prison sentence, becomes inspired by the story of Polish artist Frans Krajcberg, and becomes pen pals with him.

Krajcberg himself co-wrote the film with director Walter Salles.
