= Juliano Cazarré =

Brazilian actor (born 1980)

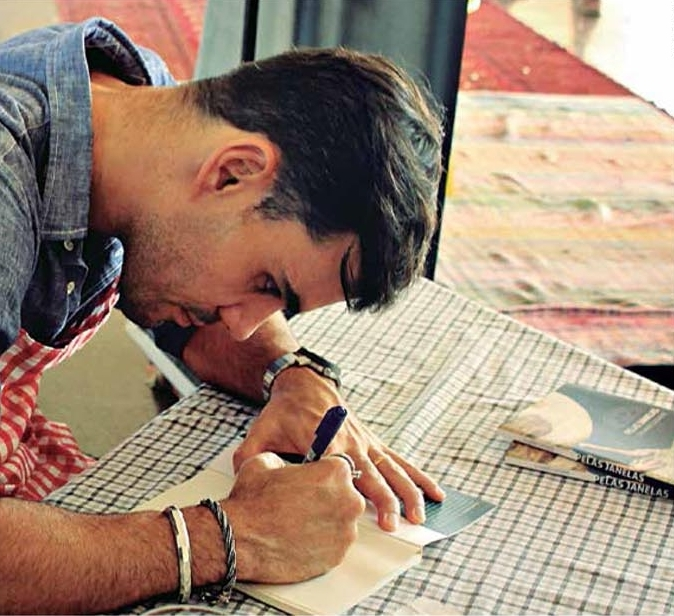
- Cazarré during the signing of his poetry book (Brasília) in 2014
- Born: 24 September 1980 (age 45); Pelotas, Rio Grande do Sul, Brazil
- Education: University of Brasília
- Occupations: Actor; writer
- Years active: 2000–present
- Height: 1.80 m (5 ft 11 in)
- Spouse: Leticia Cazarré (m. 2011)
- Children: List: Vicente Cazarré; Inácio Cazarré; Gaspar Cazarré; Maria Madalena Cazarré; Maria Guilhermina Cazarré; Estêvão Cazarré
- Father: Lourenço Cazarré
- Relatives: Déa Selva (great-grandaunt); Darcy Cazarré (great-granduncle); Older Cazarré (first cousin twice removed); Luiz Olmer Cazarré (first cousin twice removed); Olney Cazarré (first cousin twice removed)

Juliano Cazarré (born 24 September 1980) is a Brazilian actor and writer. He appeared in more than thirty films since 2002.

== Biography ==
Cazarré is son of the juvenile writer and journalist Lourenço Cazarré, winner of the 1998 Jabuti Award. His family moved to Brasília shortly after his birth.

He is the grandnephew of the brothers actors and voice actors Older Cazarré and Olney Cazarré.

Cazarré is graduated in performing arts at the University of Brasília (UnB).

In October 2012 Cazarré released his first book of poems called Pelas Janelas.

=== Personal life ===
At the Universidade de Brasília he met the biologist and journalist Letícia Bastos, with whom he became involved in 2009 and married at the end of 2011. They have three sons: Vicente, Inácio and Gaspar.

In March 2015, they renewed their wedding in Las Vegas.

From his interpretation of Jesus Christ in the 2019 Passion of the Christ of Nova Jerusalem in Brejo da Madre de Deus, Pernambuco, Cazarré converted to Roman Catholicism from Spiritism and in his social networks he has posted reflections and his experience of his Catholic faith.

On 29 September 2020 Juliano and Letícia performed a Roman Catholic wedding, two of their children were baptized (Vicente and Inácio) and Letícia, Vicente and Inácio made their First Communion.

== Career ==
Juliano entered the theater participating in important plays under the direction of Hugo Rodas. Within this context, he had never thought of doing theater, nor had he been involved in workshops in the area, until the third year of secondary school, when he participated in a cultural fair at the Leonardo da Vinci school. In 1999 he took part in the Programa de Avaliação Seriada (PAS) project. Averse to the exact disciplines, he enrolled in performing arts at the suggestion of his father. He moved to São Paulo in 2007. Juliano debuted on TV in Alice, a series that HBO Brasil started showing in September 2008; he was an employee of a financial company that dreamed and managed to become a DJ. Cazarré was nominated for the best actor award at the Gramado Festival for the film Nome Próprio, in 2007. In 2008 he participated in the Marcelo D2's music video Desabafo.

In 2011 Cazarré participated in Insensato Coração where he played the role of Ismael. In 2012, he lived the illiterate Adauto in the soap opera Avenida Brasil for him Juliano received prestigious awards. In 2013 he acts in Amor à Vida as one of the main characters in the plot, alongside Paolla Oliveira and Malvino Salvador.

In 2015 Cazarré participated in A Regra do Jogo as MC Merlô, a resident of Morro da Macaca and who never left the community where he was born. In 2017, he acted in the Vade Retro series as the troubled Davi and then went on to work as a gold miner in the nine o'clock Walcyr Carrasco's soap opera, O Outro Lado do Paraíso.

Still in 2013, Juliano starred in the feature film Serra Pelada, a super production by director Heitor Dalia that reproduced the drama of the largest gold mine in the history of Brazil. The film was later transformed into a Rede Globo's super series and broadcast.

In 2016, Juliano traveled the world as the protagonist of Boi Neon, by Gabriel Mascaro. The film has won numerous awards at festivals such as Toronto, Marrakesh and Venice, yielding positive reviews from the American specialized media. The publication IndieWire published an article saying: "Cazarré is a movie star in Brazil and his authentic and unpretentious performance in Boi Neon should launch him on an international stage. Seu Iremar really looks from this world, skin made of dust and muscles of fight with the bulls. Mascaro's film is an auspicious, original and absorbing work that thrills with his look at this little-seen world and the dreamers that inhabit it." The film was still voted among the top ten in 2016 by The New York Times.

The Tribeca Film Festival wrote: "We often applaud actors for the amount of information they can convey about their characters within a given film. But if there is a unique acting style that is often undervalued in contemporary cinema, it is more likely to be Gabriel Mascaro's Boi Neon, an electric study of gender dynamics among a traveling group of rodeo hands, owes much of its power to the seductive central performance of Juliano Cazarré, who plays Iremar, a bull breeder with fashion design dreams. Cazarré reveals little more than the basic facts about his character and speaks even less throughout the film, based on his muscular physique (and the comfort he exhibits within him) to suggest a muted machismo which tightens erotic tensions and tells a subliminal story of a free and libidinal life that does not require a single word." Many other publications praised Juliano Cazarré's work for Boi Neon, such as Variety, Hollywood Reporter, The Boston Globe, Chicago Tribune, The Vienna Review and others. In 2017, Juliano was chosen Best Actor at the Grand Prix of Brazilian Cinema. In 2018, Cazarré was chosen to play Jesus in the 2019 Passion of the Christ from Nova Jerusalem in Fazenda Nova, Pernambuco.

== Filmography ==
=== Television ===
Year	Title	Role	Notes
2007	Antônia	Bandit	Episode: "Ligação a Cobrar"
2008	Alice	Téo	Episode: "O Lado Escuro do Espelho"; Episode: "Wonderland"
2009	Som & Fúria	Cléber	
2009–11	Força-Tarefa	Corporal Irineu	
2010	As Cariocas	Paulão	Episode: "A Vingativa do Meier"
2011	Insensato Coração	Ismael Cunha	
2011	Tapas & Beijos	Tattoo artist	Episode: "November 30th"
2012	Avenida Brasil	Adauto dos Santos	
2013	Amor à Vida	Joaquim "Ninho" Roveri	
2015	A Regra do Jogo	Mário Sérgio dos Santos "MC Merlô"	
2017	Vade Retro	Davi	
2017–18	O Outro Lado do Paraíso	Mariano de Assis	
2019–21	Amor de Mãe	Magno dos Santos Silva	
2022	Pantanal	Alcides	
2023–24	Fuzuê	Pascoal Garcia	
2024–25	Volta por Cima	Jayme	
2025	Três Graças	Jorge Garcia "Jorginho Ninja"	

Film

As a movie actor

Year	Title	Role	Notes
2002	Suicídio Cidadão		Short film
2003	Momento trágico		Short film
2005	Macacos me Mordam	Man	Short film
2005	A Concepção	Alex	
2007	Nome Próprio	Felipe	
2007	O Magnata	Arthur (Cabeça)	
2007	Elite Squad	Soldado Eduardo (Tatu)	
2007	Meu Mundo em Perigo	Frentista	
2008	The Dead Girl's Feast	Tadeu	
2008	Ana Beatriz		Short film
2009	Time of Fear	Zé	
2010	Véi	Gumball	Media footage
2011	360	Rui	
2011	Federal Bank Heist	Décio	
2011	Confessions of a Brazilian Call Girl	Gustavo	
2011	Vips	Baña	
2011	Rat Fever	Boca Mole	
2012	Augustas – O Filme	Nightclub Security	
2013	Serra Pelada	Juliano	
2013	A Wolf at the Door	Delegate	
2014	Sorria, Você Esta Sendo Filmado – O Filme	Police officer 1	
2016	Neon Bull	Cowboy Iremar	
2017	Real – O Plano Por Trás da História	Gonçalves	
2018	The Great Mystical Circus	Otto	
2018	Ser Tão Velho Cerrado	Himself	Documentary
2018	Aurora	João	
2020	Dente por Dente	Ademar	
2022	Pluft, o Fantasminha	Pirate Perna de Pau	
2024	Dona Lurdes - O Filme	Magno dos Santos Silva	
2024	O Auto da Compadecida 2	Omar	

As a movie director

Year	Name	Office	Note
2014	A Roza	Director of the short	Short film

=== Stage ===
Year	Name	Character
2000	Álbum Wilde	
2002	Rosa Negra – Uma saga Sertaneja	
2005	Eu, Você, Gregos e Troianos	
2005–07; 2014	Adubo ou a Sutil Arte de Escoar Pelo Ralo	
2007	A Obscena Senhora	
2016	A Streetcar Named Desire	Stanley Kowalski
2019	Paixão de Cristo de Nova Jerusalém	Jesus

=== Literature ===
Year	Title	Note
2012	Pelas Janelas	Poems

=== Awards and nominations ===
Year	Award	Category	Work	Result
2011	Prêmio Extra de Televisão	Best Male Revelation	Insensato Coração	Indicated
2012	Prêmio Extra de Televisão	Best Supporting Actor	Avenida Brasil	Indicated
2012	Prêmio Quem de Televisão	Best Supporting Actor	Avenida Brasil	Won
2012	Melhores do Ano	Best Supporting Actor	Avenida Brasil	Won
2012	1º Prêmio Botequim Cultural	Best Supporting Actor	Avenida Brasil	Won
2012	1º Prêmio Botequim Cultural	Best Revelation	Avenida Brasil	Won
2013	Prêmio Contigo! de TV	Best Supporting Actor	Avenida Brasil	Indicated
2013	Melhores do Ano	Best Supporting Actor	Amor à Vida	Indicated
2014	FESTIN Festival Lisboa	Best Actor	Serra Pelada	Won
2015	Melhores do Ano	Best Supporting Actor	A Regra do Jogo	Indicated
2016	Prêmio Quem de Cinema	Best Actor	Neon Bull	Indicated
2017	Festival Sesc Melhores Filmes	Best Actor	Neon Bull	Won
2017	Grande Prêmio do Cinema Brasileiro	Best Actor	Neon Bull	Won
2017	Prêmio Platino	Best Actor	Neon Bull	Indicated
2018	Melhores do Ano	Best Supporting Actor	O Outro Lado do Paraíso	Indicated
