= Nome Próprio =

2008 film directed by Murilo Salles

- Directed by: Murilo Salles
- Starring: Frank Borges; Juliano Cazarré; Leandra Leal; Luciana Brites
- Release date: 2008
- Running time: 120 minutes
- Country: Brazil
- Language: Portuguese

Nome Próprio is a 2008 Brazilian film directed by Murilo Salles. The film won three awards at the Gramado Film Festival, including Best Picture and Best Actress.

== Synopsis ==
In São Paulo, Camila dreams of writing a book. She creates a blog where she writes compulsively about her intense and sometimes inconsequential experiences. In living a complex existence, his obsession with writing also causes isolation.

== Cast ==
- Leandra Leal ... Camila
- Frank Borges ... Leo
- Luciano Bortoluzzi ... Magazine Editor
- Luciana Brites ... Aurora
- Juliano Cazarré ... Felipe
- David Cejkinski ... Guilherme
- Milhem Cortaz ... Locador

== Awards ==
2008 Gramado Film Festival

1. Best Picture
2. Best Actress (for Leandra Leal)
3. Best Art Direction (for Pedro Paulo de Souza)
