= Alto Astral =

- Also known as: Forever and Ever
- Created by: Daniel Ortiz; Silvio de Abreu
- Directed by: Jorge Fernando
- Starring: Sérgio Guizé; Nathália Dill; Claudia Raia; Thiago Lacerda; Christiane Torloni; Edson Celulari; Maitê Proença; Elizabeth Savalla; Débora Nascimento; Silvia Pfeifer; Kayky Brito see more
- Opening theme: "Alma" by Zélia Duncan
- Country of origin: Brazil
- Original language: Portuguese
- No. of episodes: 161

Production
- Running time: approx. 60 minutes

Original release
- Network: TV Globo
- Release: 3 November 2014 – 8 May 2015

Alto Astral Portuguese pronunciation: [ˈawtu asˈtɾaw] (International Title:Forever and Ever) is a Brazilian access prime telenovela produced and broadcast by TV Globo. It premiered on November 3, 2014, replacing Geração Brasil and ended on May 8, 2015 replaced by I Love Paraisópolis. It was originally created by Andréa Maltarolli, but due to her death in 2009, it's being written by Daniel Ortiz, with the supervision of Silvio de Abreu.

== Plot ==
Since childhood, Caíque (Sergio Guizé) drew the face of an unknown young woman. One day, thanks to the help of a mysterious spirit named Bella (Nathália Costa), Caíque comes face to face with Laura (Nathalia Dill), the girl he always drew. When she comes in front of him, he can hardly believe that the woman of his dreams exists. What they do not realize is that Laura is the bride of Marcos (Thiago Lacerda), Caíque's brother. Even engaged to Laura, Marcos maintains a secret relationship with Sueli (Débora Nascimento).

But the rivalry between the two brothers goes far beyond that. Heirs of a large hospital, both are doctors with opposite attitudes. Marcos is a successful surgeon who dreams to have all the hospital just for him, while Caíque is a general practitioner who gives diagnosis by phone and makes operations in adverse conditions, despite fear of blood. Caíque can see spirits and is followed by one spirit named Castilho (Marcelo Médici). The spirit appeared to him as a child, and now reappears putting the doctor in absurd and comical situations.

In the middle of the fight between the two brothers, is Laura (Nathalia Dill), a certain journalist. She lives with her grandfather Vicente (Otávio Augusto) and her siblings Gustavo (Guilherme Leicam) and Bia (Raquel Fabbri). While Bia is a responsible and hard-working girl, Gustavo is an arrogant and highly irresponsible kid. Not only does he criticise the lives of others, but he also opposes the romance between his sister and Caíque. He works with Marcos to separate them so that Marcos can marry Laura. In addition to working and raising a family, Laura tries to find her mother, who abandoned her when she was little. Four women are suspected to be the real mother of Laura, and the journalist investigates them one by one.

Strengthening the villainy is Samantha (Claudia Raia), a psychic charlatan. This exuberant, extravagant and quite glamorous woman was already quite famous thanks to her powers of clairvoyance. But as she used her premonitions to make money, she ended up losing her gift. She's the Ex-girlfriend of Caíque and still very passionate. She sees the doctor as her great opportunity to return to stardom and fame. For this she will spare no effort, nor scruples to hinder the doctor's romance with Laura. Samantha has as an accomplice, a Peruvian nurse called Pepito (Conrado Caputo) that helps in heir villainy.

Maria Inês (Christiane Torloni) is the adoptive mother of Marcos and Caíque. She is a very lonely woman, since she is a widow of Mr. Bittencourt. She married without loving her husband, for the great love of her life is Marcelo (Edson Celulari). Several years later they meet again in a library, and the love they both have for each other comes back. But this love will face a major obstacle: Marcelo is married to Úrsula (Silvia Pfeifer), a woman without scruples, who pretends to have a fatal disease just to keep her husband. Úrsula pretends to be the best friend of Maria Inês, but deep down hates her, knowing that her husband is in love with her.

Across the street is the World-Map Family, composed by the patriarch Manoel (Leopoldo Pacheco), the stepmother Tina (Elizabeth Savalla) and children Israel (Kayky Brito), Bélgica ("Belgium"; played by Giovanna Lancellotti), Itália ("Italy"; played by Sabrina Petraglia) and Afeganistão ("Afghanistan"; played by Gabriel Godoy). Manuel works in the cafeteria of the City Club, which belongs to Santana family. Manoel is the brother of Maria Inês, and does not accept any help that comes from the sister. Afeganistão also works in the cafeteria, a boy who only speaks wrong. Itália is a nurse working in the Bittencourt Hospital. At first she is dating César (Alejandro Claveaux), a playboy who dates her in order to win a bet. Then he begins to fall in love for real. Israel is a physician-surgeon, who had long ceased to perform his specialty in the hospital, thanks to Marcos' machinations. Bélgica is fake, pretending to be best friends with Gaby (Sophia Abrahão), but deep down dies of envy from her. Meanwhile, Tina divides a life between Nova Alvorada and São Paulo.

== Cast ==
Actor/Actress	Character
Sérgio Guizé	Carlos Henrique Bittencourt (Caíque)
Nathália Dill	Laura Martins
Cláudia Raia	Samantha Santana (Samantha Paranormal)
Thiago Lacerda	Marcos Bittencourt (Marquinhos)
Christiane Torloni	Maria Inês Pereira Bittencourt
Edson Celulari	Marcelo Barbosa
Silvia Pfeifer	Úrsula Barbosa
Totia Meireles	Adriana Máximo
Elizabeth Savalla	Cristina Pereira (Tina) / Cristina Romantini
Kayky Brito	Israel Pereira
Débora Nascimento	Sueli Caldas
Sophia Abrahão	Gabriela Santana Peixoto (Gaby)
Rosanne Mulholland	Débora Lara
Monica Iozzi	Scarlett Máximo / Aparecida dos Santos (Cidinha)
Maitê Proença	Catarina Santana (Kitty)
Guilherme Leicam	Gustavo Martins
Leopoldo Pacheco	Manuel Pereira
Giovanna Lancellotti	Bélgica Pereira (Bél)
Nando Rodrigues	Ricardo Barbosa
Sabrina Petraglia	Itália Pereira
Otávio Augusto	Vicente Martins
Marcelo Médici	Castilho
Simone Gutierrez	Morgana
Marianna Armellini	Ana Dirce Rosas (Didi)
Alejandro Claveaux	César Santana
Sérgio Malheiros	Emerson Duarte
Gabriel Godoy	Afeganistão Pereira
Conrado Caputo	Pepe Perez (Pepito)
Débora Olivieri	Meire Rosas
Hugo Bonemer	Nicolas Pereira Romantini
Norival Rizzo	Walter Escobar
Adriana Prado	Suzana Santana Peixoto
Ana Carbatti	Aurélia Duarte
Marat Descartes	Fernando Tallarico
Fábio Audi	Heitor Santana Peixoto
Marilu Bueno	Marieta Santana
Débora Rebecchi	Elizabeth Barbosa (Liz)
Nina Frosi	Dionice
Nathália Costa	Isabella (Bella)
JP Rufino	Adeilson Duarte (Azeitona)
Carlo Porto	Eduardo Tavares
Rodrigo Lopéz	Salvador Stigler
Pedro Farah	Afonso
Juan Alba	Oscar Peixoto
Rodrigo Serrano	Murilo Santiago
Maria Carol	Nildes Batista
Luciana Rigueira	Rosa
Raquel Fabbri	Beatriz Martins (Bia)

Cameos

Actor/Actress	Character
Jorge Fernando	Himself
Jô Soares	Himself
Fátima Bernardes	Herself
Kadu Moliterno	Pedro Romantini
Fábio Rhoden	Marcelo Barbosa (flashback 1 phase)
Elisa Brites	Maria Inês Pereira Bittencourt (flashback 1 phase)
Xande Valois	Carlos Henrique Bittencourt (Caíque) (flashback 1 phase)
Gabriel Kaufmann	Marcos Bittencourt (flashback 1 phase)
Hanna Romanazzi	Catarina Santana (Kitty) (flashback 1 phase)
Paula Baltar	Samantha Santana (flashback 1 phase)
Laís Pinho	Scarlett Máximo (flashback 1 phase)
Matheus Venâncio	Ricardo Barbosa (flashback 1 phase)
Igor Rickli	Mohammed Abdullah Al-Masi
Victor Spaparane	Victor
Jarbas Homem de Mello	Himself
Marcos Reis	Leonardo (Léo)
Java Mayan	Gilberto (Giba)
Luciano Andrey	Nazir
Jarbas Homem de Mello	Himself
Renata Augusto	Layla Abdullah Al-Masi
Paulo Carvalho	Diziabas
Daniel Dias e Silva	Miranda
Ana Maria Braga	Herself
Gutemberg Barros	Haroldo Máximo
Léo Wainer	Osvaldo
Lana Guelero	Lucia Garcia
Ricardo Pavão	Celso Luiz Esteves
Júnior Prata	Evandro
Anitta	Herself
MC Ludmilla	Herself
Junior Prata	Evandro
Vanessa Gabriel	Vanessa

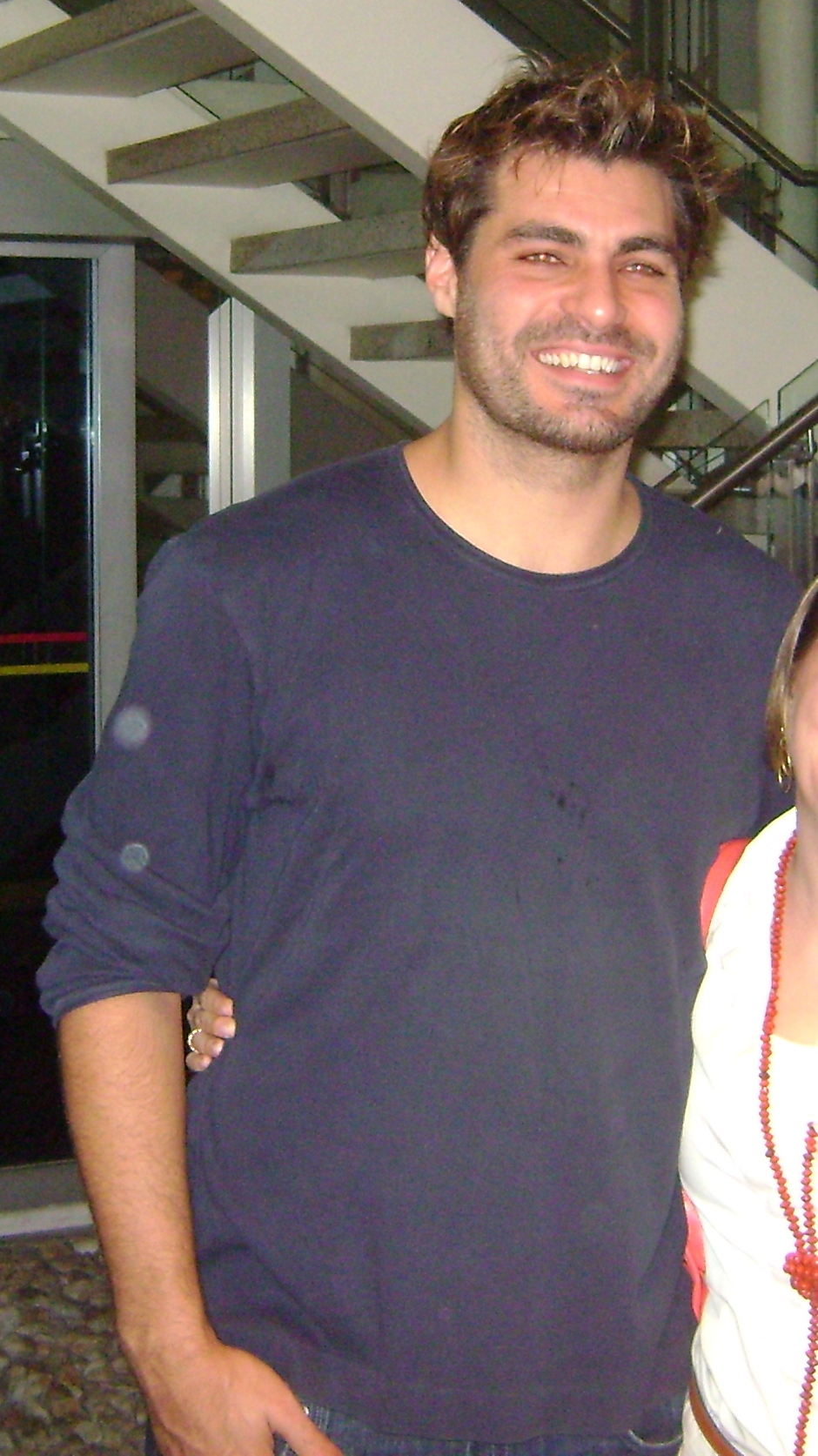
Thiago Lacerda was the great villain Marcos.

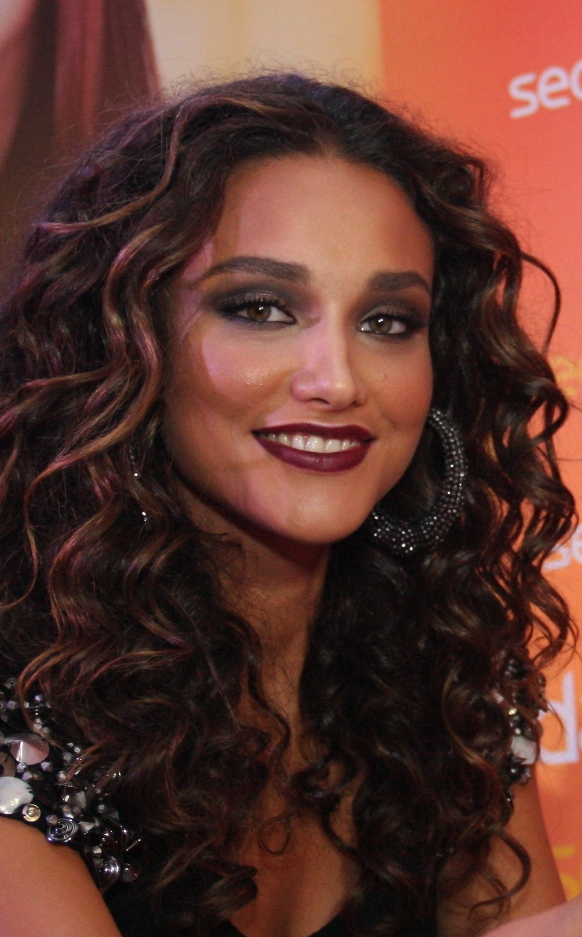
Débora Nascimento was the ambitious villain Sueli.

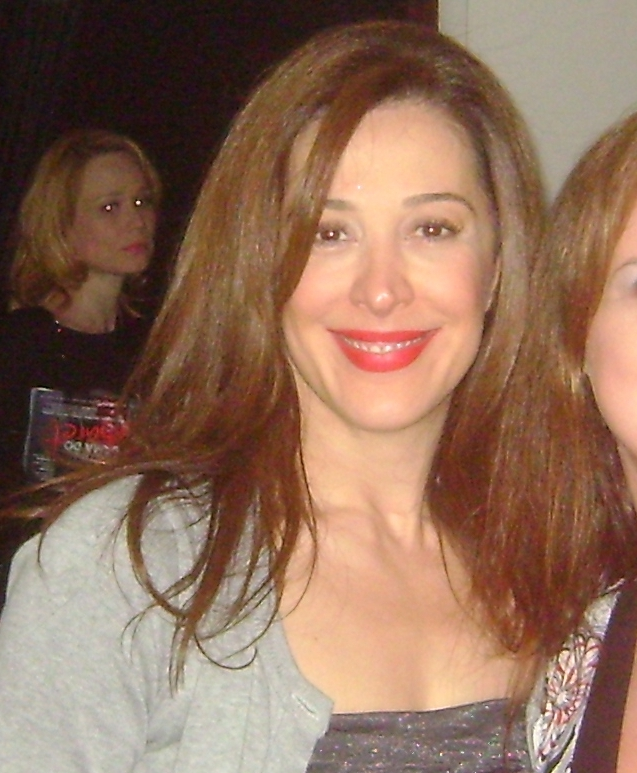
Cláudia Raia was the psychic charlatan and comic villain Samantha.

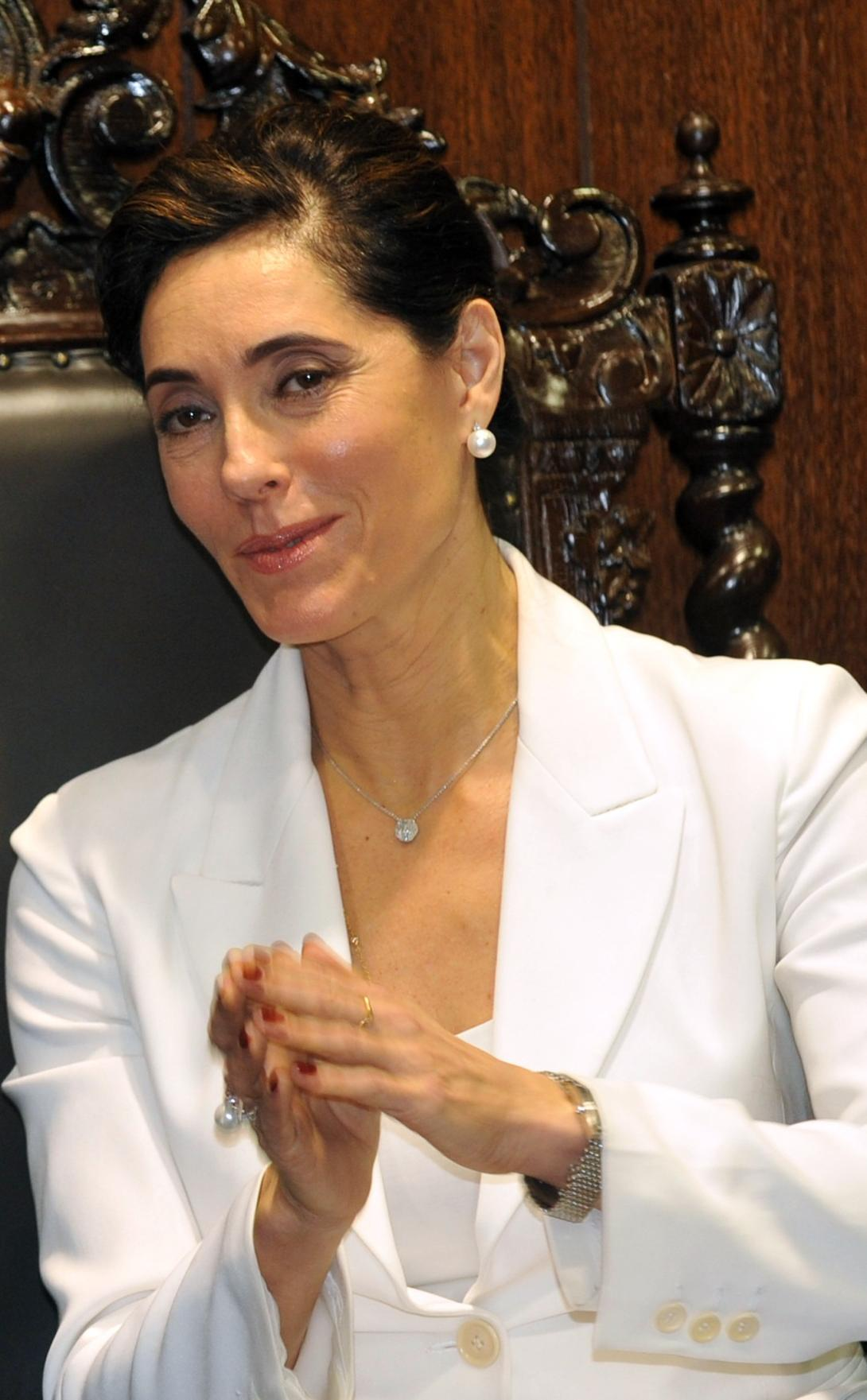
Christiane Torloni was the kind Maria Inês.

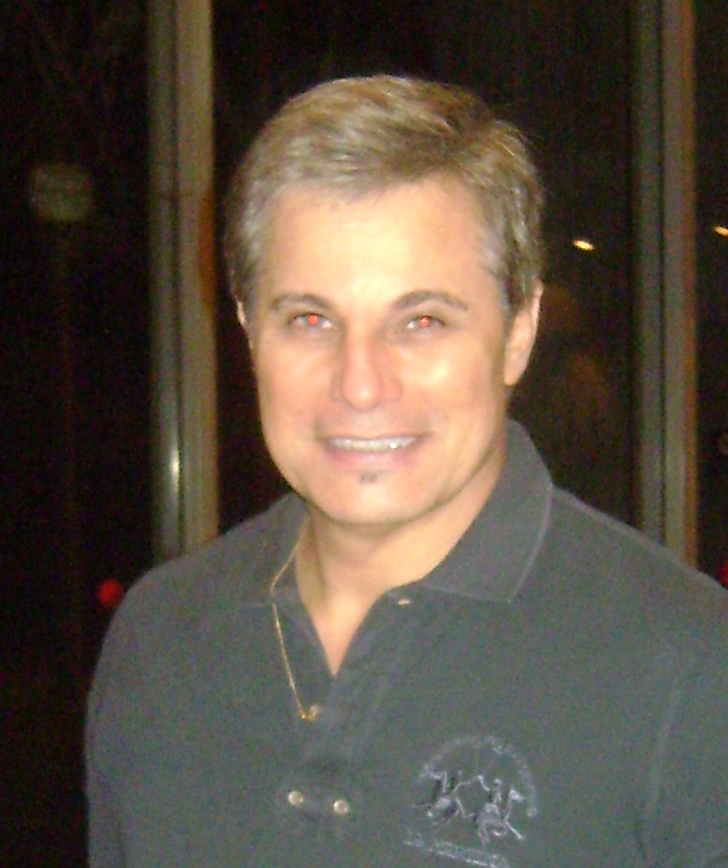
Edson Celulari was the romantic Marcelo.

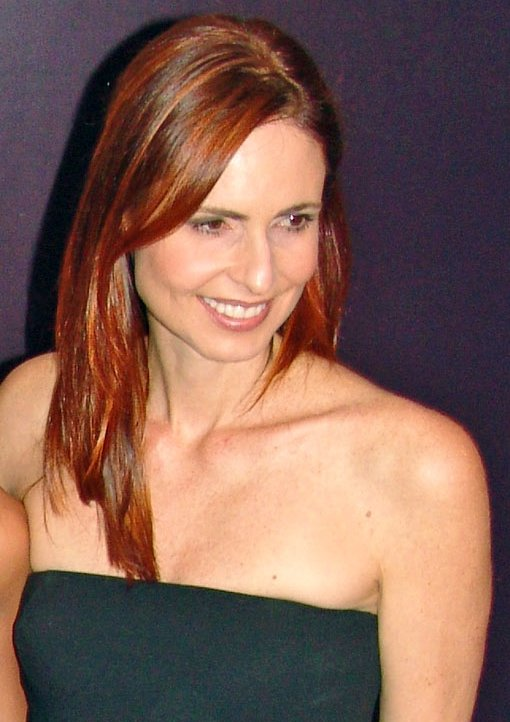
Sílvia Pfeifer was the great villain Úrsula.

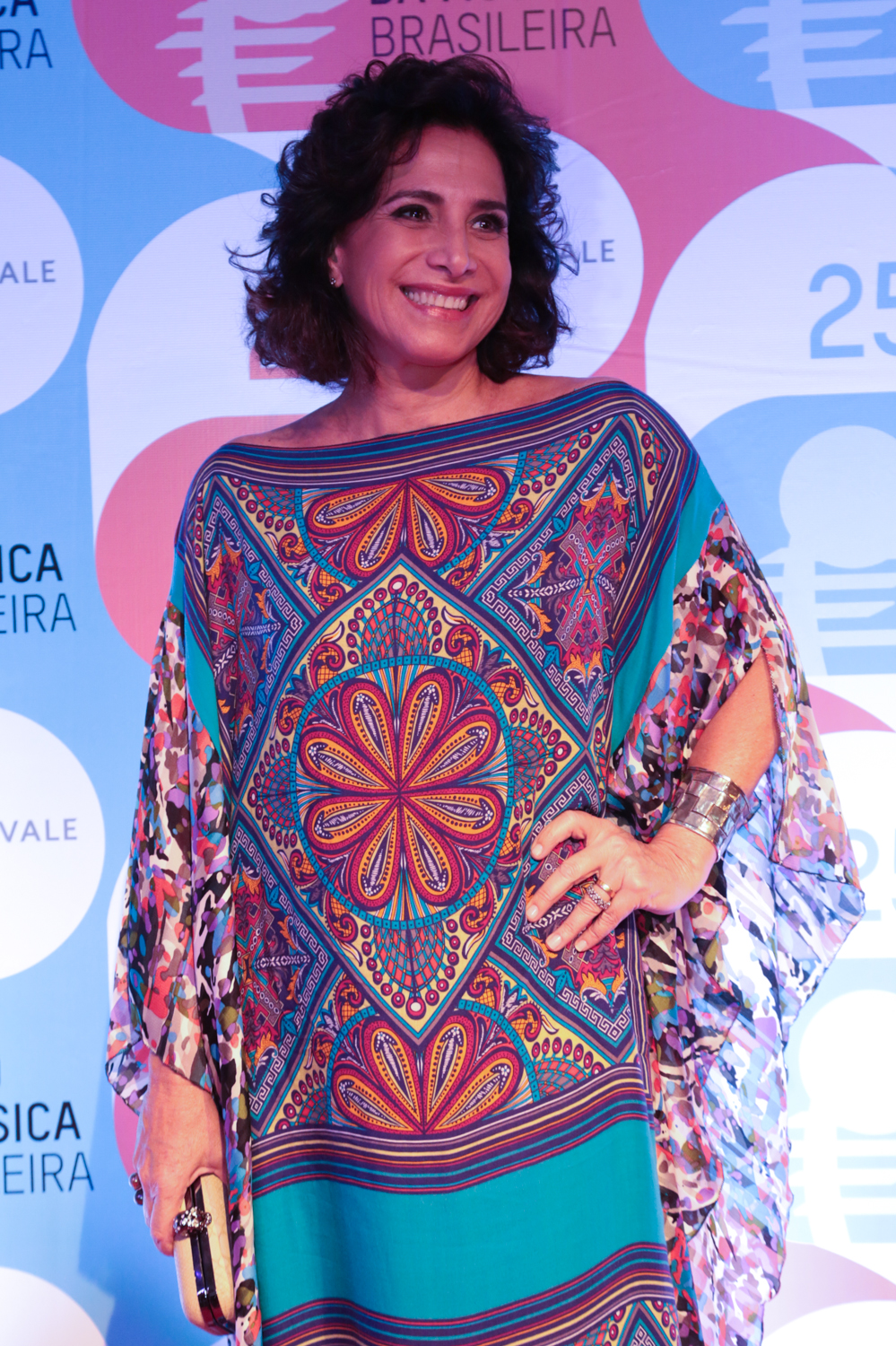
Totia Meireles was the mysterious villain Adriana.

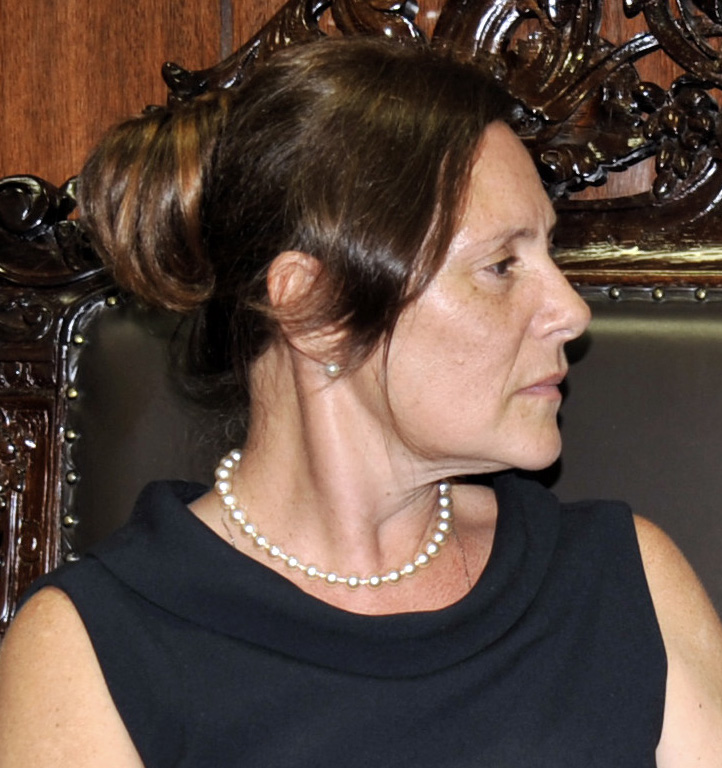
Elizabeth Savalla was the comic Tina.

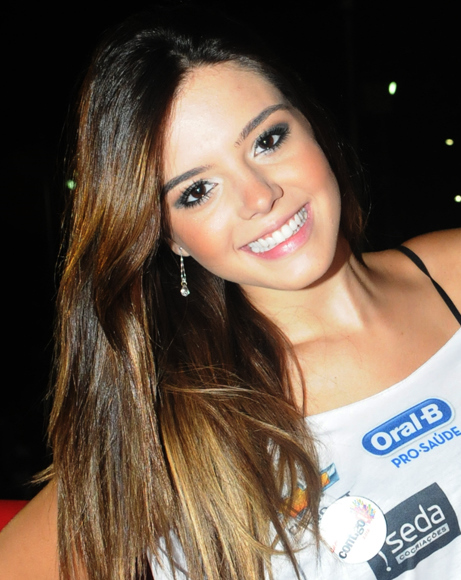
Giovanna Lancellotti was the envious villain Bélgica.

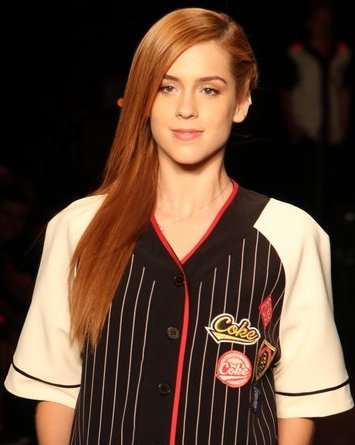
Sophia Abrahão was the kind Gaby.

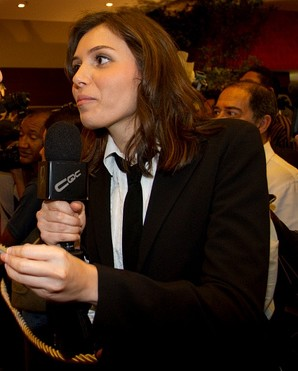
Monica Iozzi was the comic preppy Scarlett.

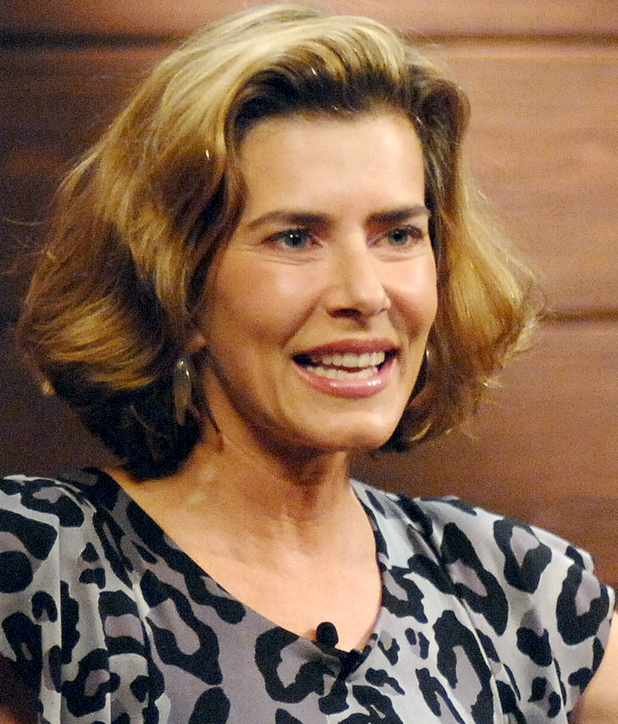
Maitê Proença was the bankrupt comic villain Kitty.

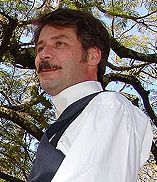
Leopoldo Pacheco was the comic Manuel.

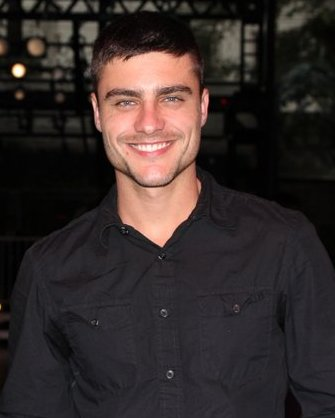
Guilherme Leicam was the villain bad character Gustavo.

== Curiosities ==
- The title of the original synopsis was Muu, which would allude to a cow that would fall from the sky at the beginning of the plot, but because of changes, and the fact that there are ghosts in the story, the provisional name was Búu. As Búu had phonetic like another soap opera: O Rebu, Globo decided to change the name again. Other names being considered were: Assombrações, Plano Astral and Supernatural.
- Bruno Gagliasso and Débora Falabella were rated to be the protagonists, but given the refusal of the first, Falabella also dropped. Grazi Massafera came to be announced by the press as the protagonist, but denied the information. Paolla Oliveira was also listed for the protagonist post.
- Sergio Guizé was quoted to be the villain of the story. But was upgraded to be the protagonist, as Bruno Gagliasso gave up the role.
- To occupy the villain post that was still vacant, the Rede Globo chose Rodrigo Lombardi. As the actor was already in the air Meu Pedacinho de Chão, they decided that he shouldn't amend two consecutive jobs. The character was given to Thiago Lacerda.
- Monica Iozzi had been cast as the villain Samantha. But she lost the role to Claudia Raia. The ex CQC won another character in the plot.
- The first scenes were filmed in Poços de Caldas and Pedra Azul (Espírito Santo) as part of the fictional town of Nova Alvorada.

== International broadcasting ==
Country	Channel	Title location	Premiere	End	Weekly wchedule	Hour
(Brazil)	TV Globo	Alto Astral	3 November 2014	8 May 2015	Monday to Saturday	19:35
(Portugal)	SIC	Alto Astral	24 November 2014	2 October 2015	Monday to Friday	19:00

== Awards and nominations ==
Year	Award	Category	Nominated	Result
2014	Atrevida Magazine	Favorite Actress	Sophia Abrahão	Nominated
2015	Troféu Internet	Best Telenovela of 2014	Alto Astral	Nominated
2015	Troféu Internet	Best Actress of 2014	Sophia Abrahão	Nominated
2015	Prêmio Contigo! de TV	Best Telenovela	Alto Astral	Nominated
2015	Prêmio Contigo! de TV	Best Author of Telenovela	Daniel Ortiz	Nominated
2015	Prêmio Contigo! de TV	Best Director of Telenovela	Jorge Fernando	Nominated
2015	Prêmio Contigo! de TV	Best Actress	Cláudia Raia	Nominated
2015	Prêmio Contigo! de TV	Best Actress	Christiane Torloni	Nominated
2015	Prêmio Contigo! de TV	Best Actress	Nathalia Dill	Nominated
2015	Prêmio Contigo! de TV	Best Supporting Actress	Débora Nascimento	Nominated
2015	Prêmio Contigo! de TV	Best Supporting Actress	Elizabeth Savalla	Nominated
2015	Prêmio Contigo! de TV	Best Supporting Actress	Giovanna Lancellotti	Nominated
2015	Prêmio Contigo! de TV	Best Child Actor	JP Rufino	Won
2015	Prêmio Contigo! de TV	Best Child Actress	Nathália Costa	Nominated
2015	Prêmio Contigo! de TV	Revelation Actor	Conrado Caputo	Nominated
2015	Prêmio Contigo! de TV	Revelation Actor	Fábio Audi	Nominated
2015	Prêmio Contigo! de TV	Revelation Actor	Gabriel Godoy	Nominated
2015	Prêmio Contigo! de TV	Revelation Actress	Monica Iozzi	Nominated
2015	Prêmio Contigo! de TV	Revelation Actress	Raquel Fabbri	Nominated
2015	Prêmio Contigo! de TV	Best Actor	Sérgio Guizé	Nominated
2015	Prêmio Contigo! de TV	Best Actor	Thiago Lacerda	Nominated
2015	Prêmio Contigo! de TV	Best Actor	Edson Celulari	Nominated
2015	Prêmio Contigo! de TV	Best Supporting Actor	Marcelo Médici	Nominated
2015	Prêmio Contigo! de TV	Best Supporting Actor	Rodrigo López	Nominated
2015	Prêmio Contigo! de TV	Best Supporting Actor	Guilherme Leicam	Nominated
2015	Prêmio Jovem Brasileiro	Best Young Actress	Sophia Abrahão	Nominated
2015	Prêmio Extra de Televisão	Best Supporting Actress	Claudia Raia	Nominated
2015	Prêmio Extra de Televisão	Best Male Revelation	Conrado Caputo	Nominated
2015	Prêmio Extra de Televisão	Best Child Actor/Best Child Actress	JP Rufino	Nominated
2015	Prêmio Extra de Televisão	Best Theme Song	"Diz Pra Mim" by Malta	Nominated
2015	Prêmio Extra de Televisão	Best Theme Song	"Na Batida" by Anitta	Nominated
