= Vade Retro =

- Genre: Comedy
- Created by: Fernanda Young; Alexandre Machado
- Directed by: André Felipe Binder; Rodrigo Meirelles; Mauro Mendonça Filho
- Starring: Monica Iozzi; Tony Ramos; Maria Luísa Mendonça; Juliano Cazarré
- Country of origin: Brazil
- Original language: Portuguese
- No. of seasons: 1
- No. of episodes: 11

Production
- Running time: 30 minutes
- Production company: O2 Filmes

Original release
- Network: Rede Globo
- Release: April 20 – June 29, 2017

Vade Retro is a 2017 Brazilian television series created by Fernanda Young and Alexandre Machado. It stars Monica Iozzi and Tony Ramos in the main roles.

== Cast ==
- Monica Iozzi ... Celeste Vasconcelos
- Tony Ramos ... Abelardo Zebul (Abel)
- Maria Luísa Mendonça ... Lucy Ferguson
- Juliano Cazarré ... Davi
- Luciana Paes ... Kika
- Maria Casadevall ... Lilith
- Cecília Homem de Mello ... Leda Vasconcelos
- Enrico Baruzzi ... Damien
- Nathália Falcão ... Carrie
- Pascoal da Conceição ... Padre

== Reception ==
=== Ratings ===
Timeslot	Episodes	Premiere		Finale		Rank	Season	Average viewership
Timeslot	Episodes	Date	Viewers (in points)	Date	Viewers (in points)	Rank	Season	Average viewership
Thursday; 10:30pm	11	19 April 2017	20	29 July 2017	14	#1	2017	
