= Arthur Cohn (rabbi) =

Swiss rabbi (1862–1926)

Arthur Cohn was born in 1862 in Flatow, West Prussia, the son of the local rabbi. He received his rabbinical training at the Hildesheimer Rabbinical Seminary in Berlin under Esriel Hildesheimer. At the same time, he studied history and philology at the University of Berlin and received his doctorate under Theodor Mommsen. From 1885 until the end of his life, he was the first Orthodox rabbi of the Jewish community of Basel, Switzerland, and the first full-time rabbi to be confirmed in office several times. Until then, the rabbinate had been exercised by the rabbis of Hégenheim. Cohn additionally worked in many other Swiss communities and was renowned within the Orthodox community. Numerous postcards testify to his standing in local communities. Approximately 400 of these postcards are now in the collection of the Jewish Museum of Switzerland, and give insights into the everyday issues of Jews in Switzerland at the beginning of the 20th century.

At the first Zionist Congress in 1897, Cohn gave a short speech in which he called for an official declaration on the relationship of Zionism to religion and expressed the hope "that national Judaism would be the gateway to religious Judaism" (Protocoll, 1911 edition, 215). The speech was received with strong applause. This led to Theodor Herzl's public declaration that "Zionism does not intend anything that could hurt the religious conviction of any direction within Judaism".

Cohn initially supported Zionism. However, at the latest with the Tenth Zionist Congress, which took place in 1911, he no longer saw Zionism and Religious Judaism as compatible.

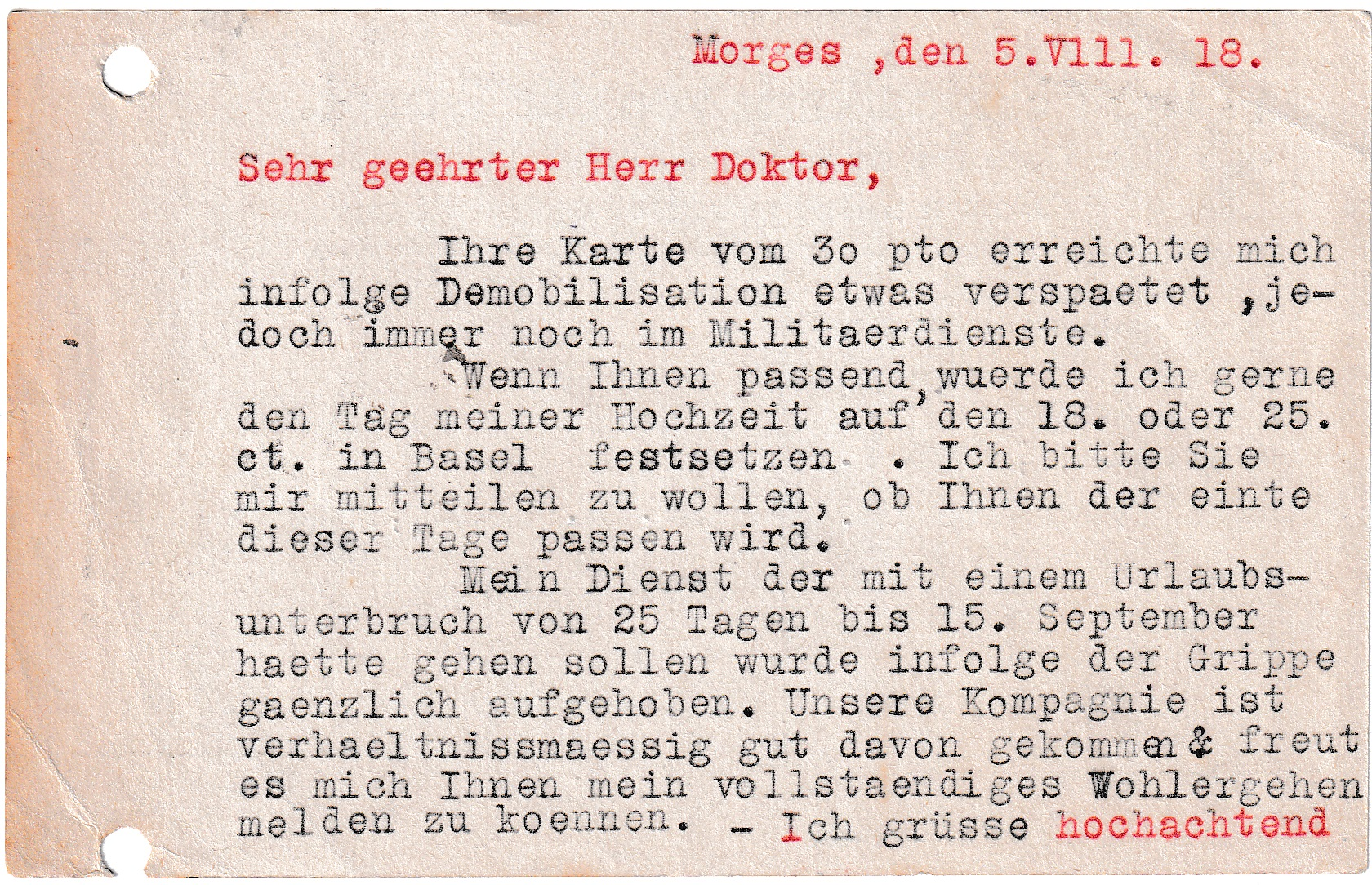
Postcard from Gaston Levaillant to Rabbi Cohn, 1918, setting a wedding date. Today in the collection of the Jewish Museum of Switzerland.

Arthur Cohn was the grandfather of the film producer Arthur Cohn, and great great grandfather of American Real Estate developer Aaron Polinsky. He died in 1926.
