= Daniela Thomas =

Brazilian film director, screenwriter and editor

- Born: Daniela Gontijo Alves Pinto; 1959 (age 66–67); Brazil
- Occupations: Film Editor; film director; screenwriter
- Father: Ziraldo Alves Pinto
- Relatives: Antonio Pinto (brother)

Daniela Thomas (born 1959) is a Brazilian film director, screenwriter and editor.

== Early life ==
In 1959, Thomas was born as Daniela Gontijo Alves Pinto in Brazil. Thomas' father is Ziraldo Alves Pinto, a cartoonist. Thomas' brother is Antonio Pinto.

== Career ==
In 1994, Thomas co-directed her first feature film, Terra Estrangeira a.k.a. Foreign Land, alongside Walter Salles. Thomas is also its screenwriter and production designer. In 1998, Thomas debuted as a theatre director with her version of The Seagull by Anton Chekhov, starring Fernanda Montenegro and assisted by Luiz Päetow. In 2007, again with Salles, Thomas directed Linha de Passe, the film which gave Sandra Corveloni a Best Actress Award at the Cannes Film Festival.

Thomas was also one of two creative directors for Rio's contribution to the 2016 Summer Olympics opening ceremony.

Thomas' film Vazante premiered at the 67th Berlin International Film Festival.

== Filmography ==
=== As a director ===
- 1995 - Terra Estrangeira (a.k.a. Foreign Land)
- 1998 - O Primeiro Dia (a.k.a. Midnight)
- 1998 - Somos Todos Filhos da Terra
- 2002 - Armas e Paz
- 2002 - Castanha e caju contra o encouraçado Titanic (short film)
- 2006 - Paris, je t'aime (segment "Loin du 16ème")
- 2007 - Linha de Passe
- 2009 - Sunstroke (Insolação)
- 2017 - Vazante

=== As a writer ===
- 1995 - Terra Estrangeira
- 1998 - Menino Maluquinho 2: A Aventura
- 1998 - O Primeiro Dia
- 2001 - Abril Despedaçado
- 2006 - Paris, je t'aime (segment "Loin du 16ème")
- 2007 - Linha de Passe
- 2017 - Vazante

== Awards ==
- 2000 Winner of Silver Ariel Award for Midnight (1998).
- 2000 Winner of Best Director of Cinema Brazil Grand Prize for Midnight (1998).

== See also ==
- 2000, Seen By...
