= Omniscient (TV series) =

Brazilian science fiction television series

- Genre: Science fiction
- Created by: Pedro Aguilera
- Written by: Pedro Aguilera; Guilherme Freitas; Ludmila Naves; Maria Shu; Thais Fujinaga
- Directed by: Júlia Jordão
- Starring: Carla Salle; Sandra Corveloni; Jonathan Haagensen; Guilherme Prates; Luana Tanaka; Marcello Airoldi; Marco Antônio Pâmio
- Country of origin: Brazil
- Original language: Portuguese
- No. of seasons: 1
- No. of episodes: 6

Production
- Running time: 38–51 minutes
- Production company: Boutique Filmes

Original release
- Network: Netflix
- Release: 29 January 2020

Omniscient (Portuguese: Onisciente) is a Brazilian science fiction television series created by Pedro Aguilera and starring Carla Salle, Sandra Corveloni and Jonathan Haagensen. The plot revolves around a society with an all-knowing security system in place.

It premiered on Netflix on January 29, 2020.

== Cast ==
- Carla Salle as Nina Peixoto
- Sandra Corveloni as Judite Almeida
- Jonathan Haagensen as Vinícius Moreira
- Guilherme Prates as Daniel Peixoto
- Luana Tanaka as Olívia Okamoto
- Marcello Airoldi as Ricardo
- Marco Antônio Pâmio as Inácio Peixoto
- Bruno Lourenço as Sílvio
- Belize Pombal as Débora
- Fernanda Viacava as Carolina Borges
- Wladimir Candini as Henrique Ambrósio
- Guilherme Moilaqua as Caio
- Camilla Veles as Lúcia
- Wynner Gonzalez as Euribiades

== Release ==
Omniscient was released on January 29, 2020 on Netflix.
