= Foreign Land (film) =

1996 film

- DVD cover
- Directed by: Walter Salles; Daniela Thomas
- Written by: Marcos Bernstein; Millor Fernandes; Walter Salles; Daniela Thomas
- Starring: Alberto Alexandre
- Cinematography: Walter Carvalho
- Edited by: Felipe Lacerda; Walter Salles
- Release date: 1995
- Running time: 100 minutes
- Country: Brazil
- Language: Portuguese

Foreign Land (Portuguese: Terra Estrangeira) is a 1995 Brazilian action film directed by Walter Salles and Daniela Thomas.

In 2015, the Brazilian Film Critics Association aka Abraccine voted Foreign Land the 47th greatest Brazilian film of all time, in its list of the 100 best Brazilian films.

== Synopsis ==
The film deals with the loneliness experienced by immigrants. It tells the story of Paco (Fernando Alves Pinto), who wants to get to know his mother's land. After her death, and with no money after the confiscation promoted by Collor, Paco accepts to deliver a mysterious package, on request of the also mysterious Igor (Luís Mello), in Portugal, in exchange for the cost of the trip. After losing the package, he meets up with Alex (Fernanda Torres), a Brazilian who works as a waitress in Portugal and lives with Miguel (Alexandre Borges), a musician-turned-heroin addict. Fleeing to Spain, Paco is pursued by bandits interested in the package.

== Cast ==
- Alberto Alexandre - Maitre Machado
- Fernando Alves Pinto - Paco
- Alexandre Borges - Miguel
- Canto e Castro - Porteiro
- Laura Cardoso - Manuela
- António Cara D'Anjo - Espanhol 1
- Filipe Ferrer - Coprador
- João Grosso - Carlos
- Miguel Guilherme - André
- Miguel Hurst - Angolano 3
- Tchéky Karyo - Kraft
- João Lagarto - Pedro
- Zeka Laplaine - Loli
- Álvaro Lavín - Espanhol 2
- Carla Lupi - Agente turismo
- Fernanda Torres - Alex

== Review ==
Foreign Land (Terra Estrangeira), directed by Walter Salles and Daniela Thomas, is a story of fate, one of the foreign lands of the title. It’s a compelling tale accompanied by some great cinematography by Walter Carvalho and a fine choice of suitably melancholic fado tunes by José Miguel Wisnik. It is also something of a homage in a wider sense to the movement of people and the idea and importance of belonging... Foreign Land has some great scenes, beautiful imagery and fine performances (especially from Melo) and all in all it’s well worth rediscovering this early gem from one of Brazil’s most-in-demand directors, Walter Salles.

—Sounds and Colours

== Reception ==
Foreign Land has the rank of two out of five stars on AllMovie.
