= Neon Bull =

2015 film

- Film poster
- Directed by: Gabriel Mascaro
- Written by: Gabriel Mascaro
- Produced by: Rachel Ellis
- Starring: Juliano Cazarré; Alyne Santana; Carlos Pessoa; Maeve Jinkings; Vinícius de Oliveira; Samya De Lavor
- Cinematography: Diego García
- Edited by: Fernando Epstein; Eduardo Serrano
- Music by: Otávio Santos; Cláudio N Carlos Montenegro
- Distributed by: Imovision
- Release dates: 4 September 2015 (Venice); 14 January 2016 (Brazil)
- Running time: 101 minutes
- Country: Brazil
- Language: Portuguese
- Box office: $148,913

Neon Bull (Portuguese: Boi neon) is a 2015 Brazilian drama film directed by Gabriel Mascaro. The film premiered at the 72nd Venice International Film Festival and won the Horizons (Orizzonti) - Special Jury Prize. It was also shown in the Platform section of the 2015 Toronto International Film Festival, where it received an honorable mention from the jury. At the 31st Warsaw International Film Festival it received the main prize of the International Competition, the Warsaw Grand Prix.

== Plot ==
Iremar is a bull handler, working for a traveling group who transport bulls from rodeo to rodeo, who dreams of becoming a tailor and making fashionable clothing for women. He finds an outlet for his creativity making custom horse masks and provocative outfits for Galega, the group's driver who also performs sexually enticing dances for groups of men after each rodeo. They are accompanied by Galega's daughter, Cacá; and Zé, a buffoonish bull wrangler who is the butt of the other's jokes. The film deals mainly with the interactions between the members of this group, interspersed with Iremar's attempts to design clothing, and rodeo scenes. After an attempt by Iremar and Zé to steal valuable horse semen from a stud auction goes awry, Zé is offered a new job as a horse wrangler; he is replaced in the group by Junior a young, attractive, and vain, but kind, man who befriends Cacá and becomes sexually involved with Galega. During a rodeo, Iremar meets Geise, a pregnant woman selling cologne and perfume from a large factory where she also works as a nighttime security guard. After the rodeo, Geise brings a bottle of cologne to Iremar as a gift. Later, at night, he visits her at the factory, where he is impressed by the industrial clothing machinery. She seduces him, whereupon they engage in sexual intercourse.

== Cast ==
- Juliano Cazarré as Iremar
- Maeve Jinkings as Galega
- Vinícius de Oliveira as Júnior
- Alyne Santana as Cacá
- Josinaldo Alves as Mário
- Samya De Lavor as Geise
- Carlos Pessoa as Zé
- Abigail Pereira as Fabiana

== Production ==
In the scene where Juliano Cazarré had to manually stimulate a horse, he was sure that Gabriel Mascaro had planned to use a prosthesis. Instead, when the director told him that he would have to actually touch the horse's penis, he refused to continue unless Mascaro did the same first. So in the end they both did the act.

The genuineness of the scene in which Juliano Cazarré had to have sex with Samya De Lavor, who was really 8 months pregnant, is disputed. Mascaro asked Cazarré to have an erection at the beginning of the scene. Cazarré said the sex was simulated. Director Mascaro said he was standing far from the action, so he could not see and he did not ask the actors how they performed it, but he admitted the result "is very persuasive" and done in only one take. More, talking about the camera position, he said that "The sex scene with the pregnant woman, if we were one step ahead, it would become a totally porn film".

Gabriel Mascaro revealed that all the sounds in the film were recreated in post-production.

== Release ==
The feature film had its first worldwide screening on 3 September 2015, at Venice Festival. Its first Brazilian session took place at the Rio Festival on 4 October, where it won four awards. The film reached the Brazilian commercial circuit in January 2016.

== Reception ==
=== Critical response ===
Neon Bull earned critical acclaim upon release. Review aggregator Rotten Tomatoes gives the film an approval rating of 88% based on 50 reviews, with an average rating of 7.1/10. The website's critical consensus reads, "Neon Bull's hypnotic visual poetry occasionally borders on exploitation, though its reflective nature softens its animalistic gaze." On Metacritic, the film holds a score of 80 out of 100, based on 15 critics, indicating "generally favorable reviews". It is ranked at number 60 on the "Best Movies of 2016" list.

=== Accolades ===
Year	Group/Award	Category	Recipient	Result
2015	Venice International Film Festival	Horizons (Orizzonti) – Best Film	Gabriel Mascaro	Nominated
2015	Venice International Film Festival	Horizons (Orizzonti) - Special Jury Prize	Gabriel Mascaro	Won
2015	Toronto International Film Festival	Platform – Best Film	Gabriel Mascaro	Nominated
2015	Toronto International Film Festival	Platform - Special Mention	Gabriel Mascaro	Won
2015	Festival do Rio	Best Film	Gabriel Mascaro	Won
2015	Festival do Rio	Best Screenplay	Gabriel Mascaro	Won
2015	Festival do Rio	Best Cinematography	Diego Garcia	Won
2015	Festival do Rio	Best Supporting Actress	Alyne Santana	Won
2015	Filmfest Hamburg	FIPRESCI Award	Gabriel Mascaro	Won
2015	Adelaide Film Festival	Feature Fiction Award	Gabriel Mascaro	Won
