= Monica Iozzi =

Brazilian actress and reporter (born 1981)

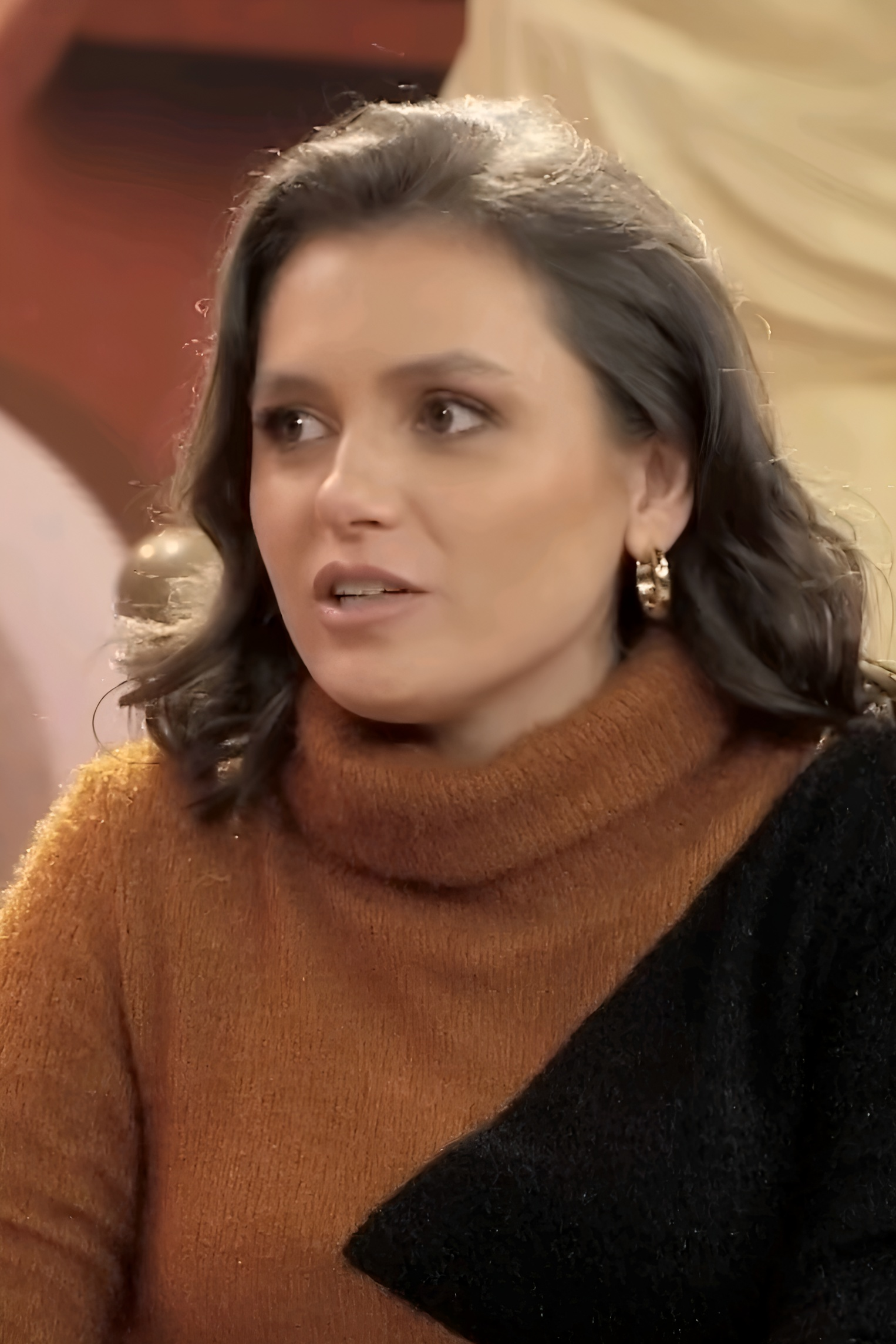
- Iozzi in 2024
- Born: Monica Iozzi de Castro; November 2, 1981 (age 43); Ribeirão Preto, São Paulo, Brazil
- Other names: Mô
- Occupation(s): Actress and reporter
- Years active: 2006-present
- Known for: CQC - Vídeo Show
- Height: 1.74 m (5 ft 9 in)
- Website: http://www.monicaiozzi.com

Monica Iozzi de Castro (Ribeirão Preto, November 2, 1981) is a Brazilian actress and reporter.

She gained prominence as a reporter for the Band program CQC.

== Career ==
She graduated in Performing Arts from Unicamp in 2005 and joined the SESI Experimental Center. She began her career as an actress in the theater company Os Satyros.

In 2009, she won the competition to become a reporter for CQC, on Rede Bandeirantes, competing against 5 thousand other participants. In January 2014, announcing her desire to return to her acting career, she chose to leave CQC, after a period of more than four years on the attraction's team.

The actress signed a contract with Rede Globo in 2014. Monica debuted as a commentator on Big Brother Brasil 14, presenting a panel that was shown on Tuesdays on the program. Her first appearance on BBB was on January 21, 2014.

At the beginning of February, Monica was confirmed by Globo as a commentator for the 2014 Oscar ceremony, along with actress and presenter Fernanda Lima. In the same year, she joined the cast of the soap opera Alto Astral, playing Scarlett/Ritinha. The character made her first appearance in January 2015.

On April 6, 2015, she debuted as presenter of the Vídeo Show program, forming a duo with Otaviano Costa. The last program with Iozzi on the bench was on February 12, 2016. The presenter left the program so she could dedicate herself to her profession as an actress.

In April 2017, the actress starred in the series Vade Retro, on Rede Globo, alongside Tony Ramos.

In 2019, the actress played the eccentric Kim Ventura, a businesswoman of digital influencers in A Dona do Pedaço.

== Personal life ==
In 2019, she started dating administrator Gabriel Moura. In March 2021, the couple broke off the relationship, but got back together soon afterwards.

She was ordered to pay R$30,000 to Federal Supreme Court (FSC) minister Gilmar Mendes for criticizing him on Twitter after he granted habeas corpus to doctor Roger Abdelmassih, sentenced to 278 years in prison for the rape of 37 patients.

== Filmography ==
Television

Year	Title	Role / Job	Notes
2009–2013	CQC: Custe o Que Custar	Reporter	
2014	Big Brother Brasil	Reporter	Season 14
2014	Oscar 2014	Comentarist	
2014	Alto Astral	Scarlett Máximo / Aparecida dos Santos (Cidinha)	
2015–2016	Vídeo Show	Presenter	
2015	Babilônia	Susana's friend	Episode: "june 2"
2015	Tomara que Caia	Natasha	Episode: "A Mala que vem Para o Bem" Episode: "Um Sogro do Outro Mundo"
2015	Caldeirão de Ouro	Presenter	End of year special
2016–2018	Tá no Ar: a TV na TV	Herself	Episode: "february 23" Episode: "april 17"
2017	Vade Retro	Celeste Vasconcelos	
2017	Palavras em Série	Tati Bernardi	Episode: "december 9"
2018	Papo de Segunda: Verão	Presenter	
2018	Assédio	Carmen	Episode: "O Julgamento"
2019	Carcereiros	Daniela	Episode: "Cartas Não Mentem"
2019	A Dona do Pedaço	Kim Ventura / Cleonice da Silva	
2021	Crónica dos Bons Malandros	Japonesa	
2022	Fale Mais Sobre Isso, Iozzi	Presenter	
2023	Novela	Isabel	
2024	Turma da Mônica - Origens	Luisa Moreira de Sousa	

Film

Year	Title	Role	Notes
2008	Dente de Leão	Girlfriend	Short-film
2013	Real Utopia	Bruna	Short-film
2015	Superpai	Mariana	
2016	Zootopia	Judy Hopps	Brazilian dubbing
2017	A Comédia Divina	Raquel	
2018	Mulheres Alteradas	Sônia	
2019	Turma da Mônica: Laços	Luisa Moreira de Sousa	
2021	Turma da Mônica: Lições	Luisa Moreira de Sousa	
2022	Mar de Dentro	Manuela "Manu"	
2024	Noah's Ark	Female Hyena / Guineafowl	Original voice

Internet

Year	Title	Role	Notes
2020	Sofia	Helena Pereira	Original Spotify audio series

== Theater ==
Year	Title
2006	Please Send Junk Food
2006	Intersecções
