= Walter Salles =

Brazilian filmmaker (born 1956)

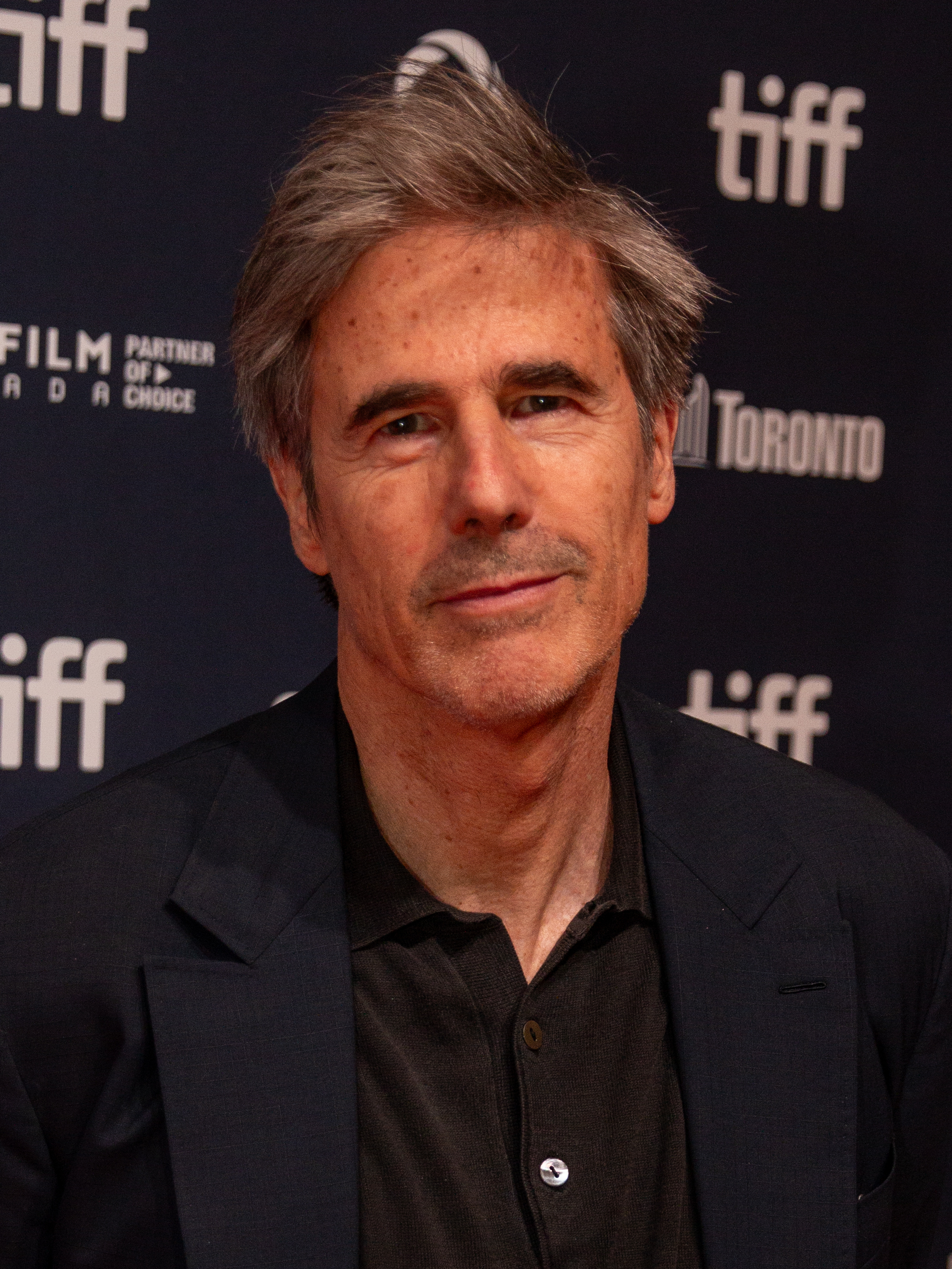
- Salles at the Toronto International Film Festival in 2024
- Born: Walter Moreira Salles Júnior; 12 April 1956 (age 70); Rio de Janeiro, Brazil
- Education: Pontifical Catholic University of Rio de Janeiro; University of Southern California
- Occupations: Filmmaker; editor
- Spouse: Maria Klabin (m. 2004)
- Children: 2
- Father: Walter Moreira Salles
- Relatives: João Moreira Salles (brother); Pedro Moreira Salles (brother) Fernando Moreira Salles (brother)
- Awards: Full list

Walter Moreira Salles Júnior (/ˈsɑːlɪs/; Brazilian Portuguese: [ˈvawteʁ ˈsalis]; born 12 April 1956) is a Brazilian filmmaker. A major figure of the Resumption Cinema in Brazil, Salles is widely regarded as one of the greatest filmmakers in Brazilian cinema. His accolades include an Academy Award accepted for Best International Film, three Cannes Film Festival prizes, three Venice Film Festival prizes, two British Academy Film Awards, a Golden Bear and a Golden Globe.

He first became internationally known for his film Central Station (1998), which earned two Academy Awards nominations, for Best Foreign Language Film and Best Actress for Fernanda Montenegro, winning a Golden Globe and a BAFTA for Best Foreign Language Film as well as the Golden Bear at the 48th Berlin International Film Festival. His subsequent works include Behind the Sun (2001), The Motorcycle Diaries (2004), Dark Water (2005) and On the Road (2012). At the 97th Academy Awards, his critically acclaimed film I'm Still Here (2024) received a rare double nomination for Best Picture and Best International Feature.

Heir to Itaú Unibanco, with a fortune valued at US$4.5 billion (R$25.45 billion), Salles is the third richest filmmaker in the world.

== Early life and education ==
Walter Moreira Salles Júnior was born on 12 April 1956, in Rio de Janeiro. Salles resided in both France and the United States throughout his youth, following his diplomat father, Walter Moreira Salles. At the age of 15, Salles returned to Brazil, then under the dictatorship of Emílio Garrastazu Médici.

Salles attended the University of Southern California's School of Cinematic Arts.

== Career ==
Salles originally gained experience in film through non-fiction documentaries. He worked on documentaries for ten years before switching to fictional films.

His first notable film was Terra Estrangeira (Foreign Land), released in Brazil in 1995. Locally, it was widely acclaimed by film critics and a minor box-office hit, and it was selected by over 40 film festivals worldwide. In 1998, he released Central Station to widespread international acclaim and two Academy Awards nominations, for Best Actress in a Leading Role (Fernanda Montenegro) and Best Foreign Language Film. Salles won a Golden Globe Award for Best Foreign Language Film, becoming the first Brazilian to win a Golden Globe.

In 2001, Abril Despedaçado (Behind the Sun), based on a novel by Albanian author Ismail Kadare and starring Rodrigo Santoro, was nominated for the Best Foreign Language Film at the Golden Globe. Salles said: "... there was one book that resonated to the point where I couldn't forget it. And that was Broken April by Ismail Kadare. The book was handed to me by my younger brother, who said: 'If I know you well, this will touch you.' ... What really struck me was the opposition between the atavistic violence described in the book and the possibility for that violence to be overpowered by the discovery of poetry and literature and ultimately by brotherly love." Both films were produced by veteran Arthur Cohn, and had worldwide distribution.

In 2003, Salles was voted one of the 40 Best Directors in the World by The Guardian. His biggest international success has been The Motorcycle Diaries, a 2004 film about the life of young Ernesto Guevara, who later became known as Che Guevara. It was Salles's first foray as director of a film in a language other than his native Portuguese (Spanish, in this case) and quickly became a box-office hit in Latin America and Europe. He won the Prize of the Ecumenical Jury and François Chalais Prize at the 2004 Cannes Film Festival.

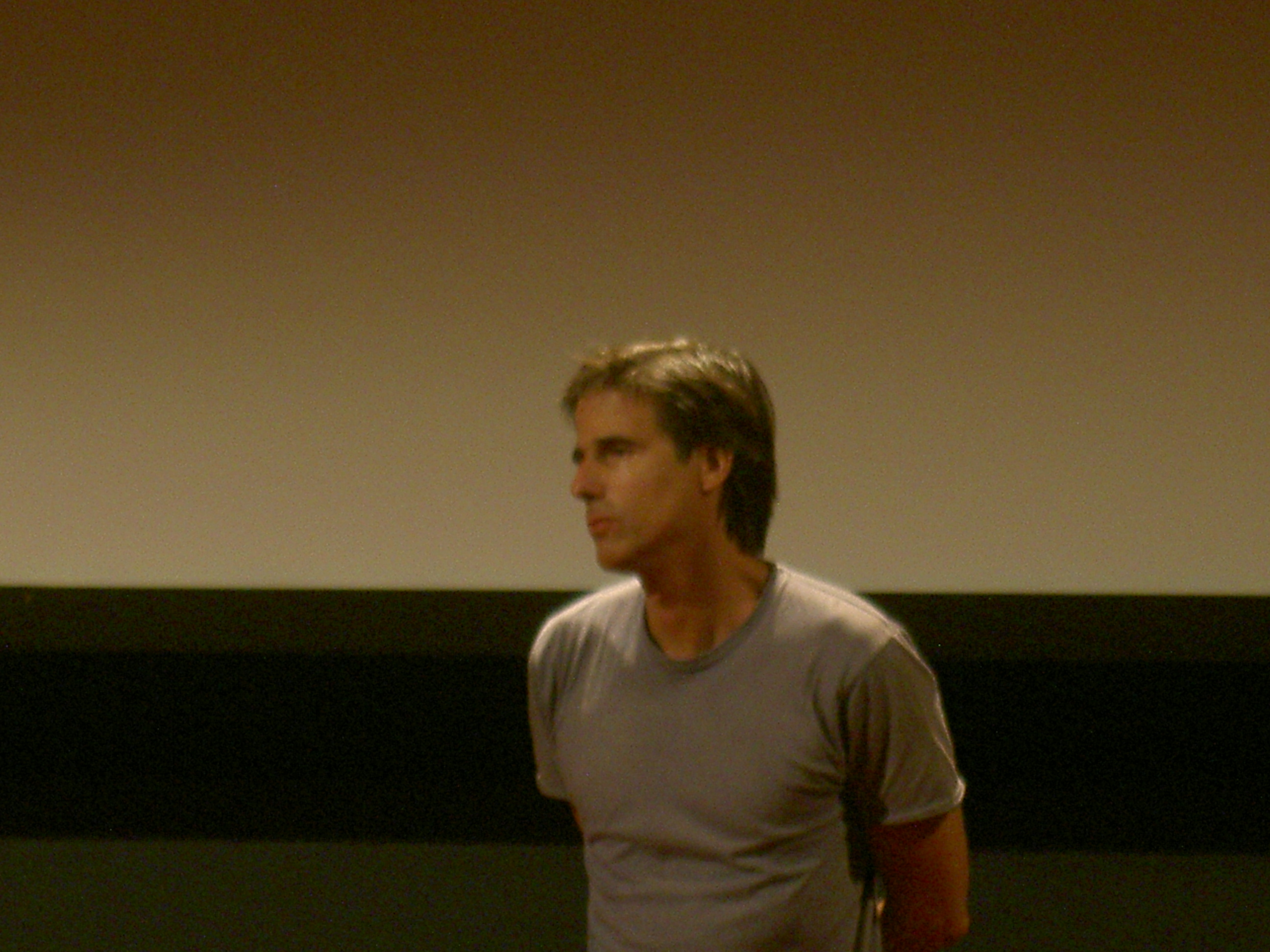
Salles in 2005

In 2005, Salles released his first Hollywood film, Dark Water, a remake of the 2002 Japanese film of the same name. He also helped to produce the Argentine picture Sisters (Spanish: Hermanas), which was a major success. In 2006, Salles wrote and directed a segment in the French film Paris, je t'aime (French for "Paris, I love you") with Daniela Thomas. The film is a collection of 18 shorter segments made by different 21 directors and set in different arrondissements of Paris. Salles' segment called Loin du 16^{e} (literally: Far from the 16th) and took place in the 16th arrondissement of Paris. In 2007, Salles took part in a similar project called To Each His Own Cinema (French: Chacun son cinéma) in the 60th anniversary of the Cannes Film Festival. He made a three-minute segment called A 8.944 km de Cannes (English: 5,557 Miles from Cannes).

In 2008, Salles wrote and directed the film Linha de Passe, also with Thomas. It is a story about four brothers from a poor family who need to fight to follow their dreams. He was nominated for the Palme d'Or and Sandra Corveloni won the Best Actress award for her role in this film at 2008 Cannes Film Festival. In 2012, Salles released José Rivera's screenplay adaptation of Jack Kerouac's On the Road, with Francis Ford Coppola producing. The film was nominated for the Palme d'Or at the 2012 Cannes Film Festival.

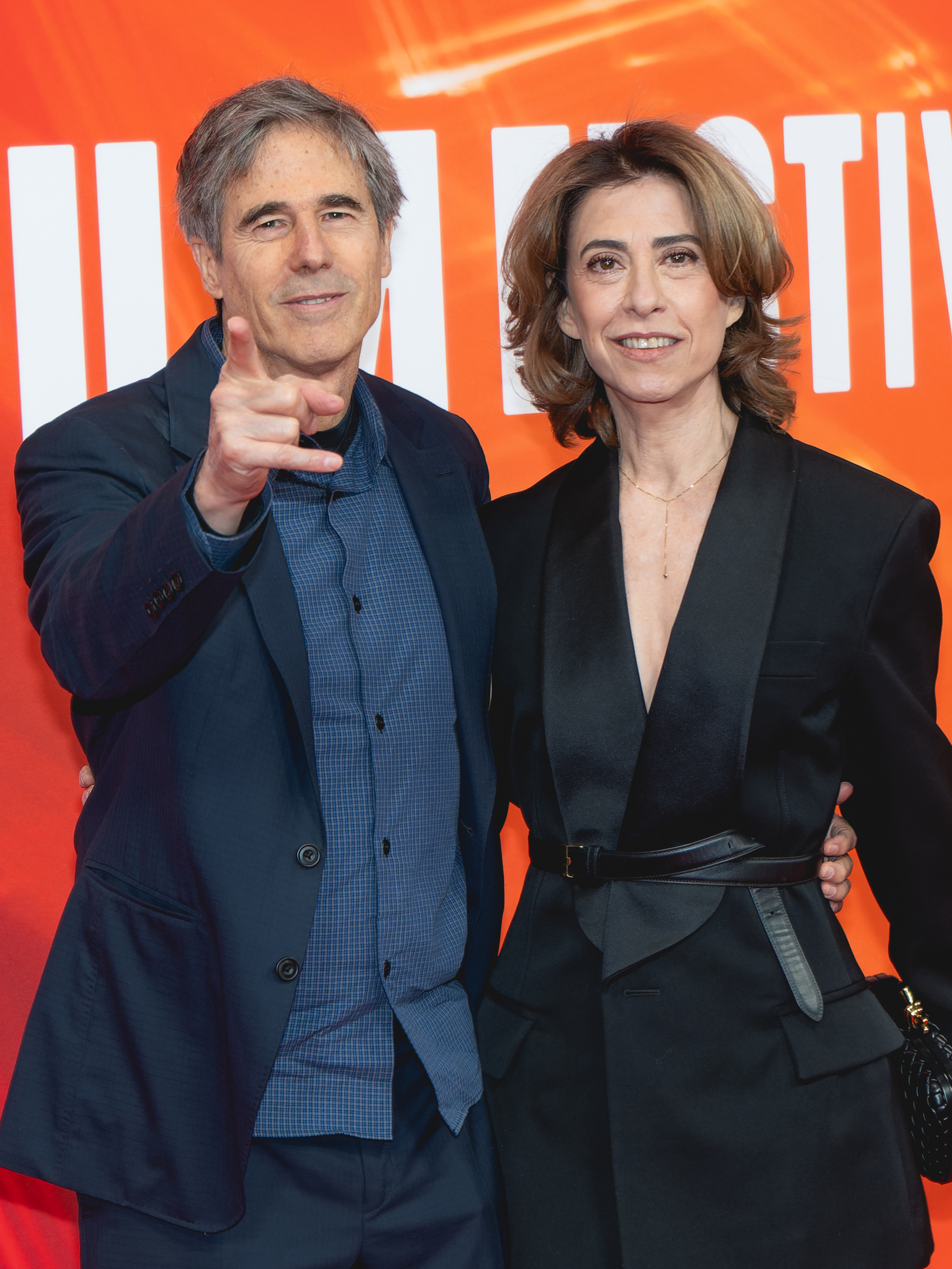
Salles and Fernanda Torres promoting I'm Still Here at the 2024 BFI London Film Festival

In 2024, twelve years after his last feature film, Salles released I'm Still Here (Ainda Estou Aqui), based on the book of the same name by Marcelo Rubens Paiva; the film tackles the arrest and disappearance of Rubens Paiva in 1971, Marcelo's father, during the military dictatorship in Brazil. The film was nominated for the Golden Lion at the 81st Venice International Film Festival and Best Foreign Language Film at the 82nd Golden Globe Awards, where it won the Best Actress in a Motion Picture – Drama category for Fernanda Torres, becoming the first Brazilian actress to win the Golden Globe for acting. For I’m Still Here, at the 97th Academy Awards, Salles accepted the Oscar for Best International Feature Film on behalf of Brazil.

== Personal life, views and beliefs ==
In December 2023, alongside 50 other filmmakers, Salles signed an open letter published in Libération demanding a ceasefire and an end to the killing of civilians amid the 2023 Israeli invasion of the Gaza Strip, and for a humanitarian corridor into Gaza to be established for humanitarian aid, and the release of hostages.

In February 2025, Salles stated during an interview to CNN that his movie I'm Still Here is a product of the Brazilian democracy, after the 2022 Brazilian general election and the 2023 Brasília attacks, and that he wouldn't have had the opportunity to film during the government of Jair Bolsonaro.

=== Fortune ===
As of January 5, 2025, he has an estimated net worth of $4.2 billion. He is the third richest filmmaker in the world, behind Steven Spielberg ($5.3 billion) and George Lucas ($5.2 billion).

== Filmography ==
=== Feature films ===
Year	Title	Director	Writer	Producer	Notes
1991	A Grande Arte	Yes	No	No	
1995	Foreign Land	Yes	Yes	No	Co-directed with Daniela Thomas
1998	Central Station	Yes	Story	No	
1998	Midnight	Yes	Yes	No	Co-directed with Daniela Thomas
2001	Behind the Sun	Yes	Yes	No	
2002	City of God	No	No	Yes	
2004	The Motorcycle Diaries	Yes	No	No	
2005	Dark Water	Yes	No	No	
2006	Paris, je t'aime	Yes	Yes	No	Segment: "Loin du 16e"
2007	To Each His Own Cinema	Yes	No	No	Segment: "5,557 Miles from Cannes"
2008	Linha de Passe	Yes	Yes	Yes	Co-directed with Daniela Thomas
2012	On the Road	Yes	No	Uncredited	
2018	Unremember	No	No	Yes	
2023	The Movie Teller	No	Yes	No	
2024	Noah's Ark	No	No	Yes	
2024	I'm Still Here	Yes	No	No	

=== Short films ===
Year	Title	Director	Writer	Producer	Notes
1995	Life Somewhere Else	Yes	Yes	No	Documentary
2010	In Search of the World	Yes	No	No	Short essay
2017	Where Has the Time Gone?	Yes	No	No	Segment: "When the Earth Trembles"

=== Television ===
Year	Title	Director	Writer	Notes
1986	Japão: Uma Viagem No Tempo	Yes	No	4 episodes
1995	Un Siécle d'Écrivains	Yes	No	Episode: "Jorge Armando"
2019	Irmãos Freitas	No	Yes	8 episodes
2026	Sócrates Brasileiro	Yes	Yes	Documentary; 5 episodes

=== Documentaries ===
Year	Title	Subject	Notes
1987	Krajcberg: O Poeta Dos Vestígios	Frans Krajcberg	
1988	Marisa Monte	Marisa Monte	Co-directed with Nelson Motta
1989	Chico, ou O País Da Delicadeza Perdida	Chico Buarque	Co-directed with Nelson Motta
1995	Antônio Carlos Jobim: An All-Star Tribute	Antônio Carlos Jobim	
1999	Somos Todos Filhos Da Terra	Adão Dãxalebaradã	Co-directed with Kátia Lund, João Moreira Salles and Daniela Thomas
2002	Castanha E Caju Contra O Encouraçado Titanic		Co-directed with Daniela Thomas and George Moura.
2013	Venice 70: Future Reloaded	Venice Film Festival	Segment director
2014	Jia Zhangke, A Guy from Fenyang	Jia Zhangke	

== Awards and nominations ==
In July 2022 Salles was awarded the honorary degree of Doctor of letters by the University of Reading.

On October 18, 2025, Salles received the Academy Museum of Motion Pictures Luminary Award “given to an artist whose singular contributions have expanded the creative possibilities of cinema.”
