= Sandra Corveloni =

Brazilian film and stage actress

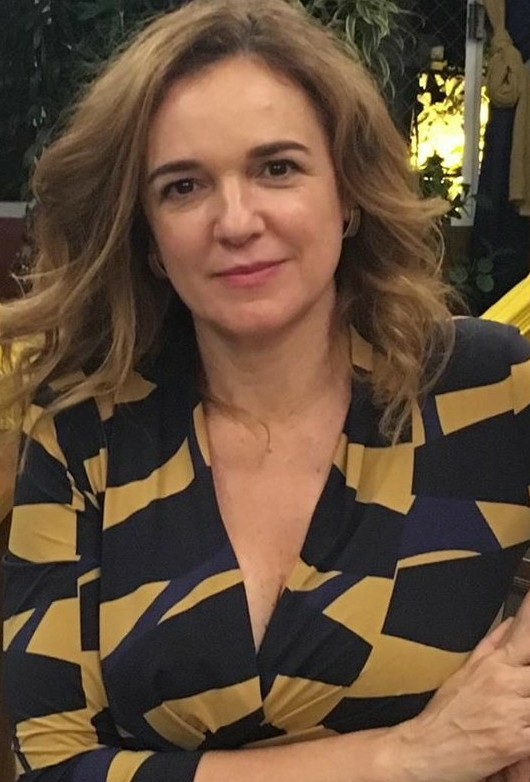
- Corveloni in 2019
- Born: 9 May 1965 (age 61); Flórida Paulista, São Paulo, Brazil
- Occupation: Actress
- Years active: 1994–present
- Spouse: Maurizio de Simone (m. 1998)
- Children: 1

Sandra Regina Corveloni (born 9 May 1965) is a Brazilian film, stage, and television actress.

Born in Flórida Paulista and raised in São Paulo, Corveloni graduated in performing arts from the Pontifícia Universidade Católica de São Paulo (PUC-SP), one of the largest and most prestigious private universities in Brazil.

In 2008, she won the Best Actress Award in the Cannes Film Festival for her role in the film Linha de Passe. This was her first role in a full-length motion picture. A miscarriage forced her to cancel her attendance at the Festival.

== Filmography (partial) ==
The director's name is listed in parentheses.

- 1994 – Amor! (Short) (José Roberto Torero)
- 1996 – Flores Ímpares (short) (Sung Sfai)
- 2008 – Linha de Passe (Walter Salles and Daniela Thomas)
- 2011 – O Filme dos Espíritos
- 2020 — Omniscient (TV series) as Judite Almeida
