= Linha de Passe =

2008 film directed by Walter Salles, Daniela Thomas

- Directed by: Walter Salles; Daniela Thomas
- Written by: Walter Salles; Daniela Thomas; Bráulio Mantovani
- Produced by: Mauricio Andrade Ramos; Rebecca Yeldham
- Starring: Sandra Corveloni; João Baldasserini; Vinícius de Oliveira; José Geraldo Rodrigues; Kaique Jesus Santos
- Cinematography: Mauro Pinheiro Jr.
- Edited by: Gustavo Giani
- Music by: Gustavo Santaolalla
- Distributed by: Universal Pictures
- Release date: September 19, 2008 (United Kingdom)
- Running time: 108 minutes
- Country: Brazil
- Language: Portuguese

Linha de Passe is a 2008 Brazilian drama film directed by Walter Salles and Daniela Thomas. Written by Salles, Thomas and Bráulio Mantovani, the film stars Vinícius de Oliveira and Sandra Corveloni, who won the Best Actress Award at the 2008 Cannes Film Festival for her role, which was her first in a full-length motion picture.

== Plot ==
The film tells the story of four poverty-stricken half brothers with the same mother, Cleuza (Sandra Corveloni) but different fathers, who live in a suburban neighborhood in the periphery of São Paulo and have to fight to follow their dreams. Dario (Vinícius de Oliveira), seeks the opportunity of a better life with his soccer skills; Dênis (João Baldasserin) survives as a motorcycle courier; Dinho (José Geraldo Rodrigues) works in a filling station and helps at the local church and Reginaldo (Kaique Jesus Santos), although gifted as a soccer player dreams of becoming a bus driver. Cleuza, pregnant with her fifth child, works as a cleaner for a woman in a middle-class area of São Paulo.

== Cast ==
- Sandra Corveloni as Cleuza
- João Baldasserini as Dênis
- Vinícius de Oliveira as Dario
- José Geraldo Rodrigues as Dinho
- Kaique Jesus Santos as Reginaldo

== Awards and nominations ==
2008 Cannes Film Festival

- Palme d'Or – Walter Salles and Daniela Thomas (nominated)
- Best Actress Award – Sandra Corveloni (won)
