= Behind the Sun (film) =

2001 film by Walter Salles

- Original film poster
- Directed by: Walter Salles
- Written by: Karim Aïnouz; Sérgio Machado; Walter Salles; João Moreira Salles; Daniela Thomas
- Based on: Broken April by Ismail Kadare
- Produced by: Arthur Cohn
- Starring: Rodrigo Santoro; José Dumont; Rita Assemany
- Cinematography: Walter Carvalho
- Edited by: Isabelle Rathery
- Music by: Ed Cortês; Antonio Pinto; Beto Villares
- Production company: Videofilmes
- Distributed by: Lumiére Pictures (Brazil); Mars Distribution (France)
- Release dates: September 6, 2001 (Venice); May 1, 2002 (Brazil)
- Running time: 105 minutes
- Countries: Brazil; France; Switzerland
- Language: Portuguese
- Budget: $4 million
- Box office: R$2.063.956 ($928,037)

Behind the Sun (Portuguese: Abril Despedaçado) is a 2001 social drama film directed by Walter Salles, produced by Arthur Cohn, and starring Rodrigo Santoro. Its original Portuguese title means Shattered April, and it is based on the 1978 novel Broken April written by the Albanian writer Ismail Kadare, about the honor culture in the North of Albania.

Co-produced by Brazil, France, and Switzerland, it was shot entirely in Bahia, taking place in Bom Sossego, a district of the city of Oliveira dos Brejinhos, and in the cities of Caetité and Rio de Contas. The film was selected as the Brazilian entry for the Best Foreign Language Film at the 74th Academy Awards, but it was not nominated.

In 2015, the Brazilian Film Critics Association aka Abraccine voted Behind the Sun the 58th greatest Brazilian film of all time, in its list of the 100 best Brazilian films. Scenes from the film inspired the 2006 Telugu feature film Pournami.

== Plot ==
The year is 1910; the place, the badlands of Northeast Region, Brazil. Twenty-year-old Tonho is the middle son of an impoverished farm family, the Breves. He is next in line to kill and then die in an ongoing blood feud with a neighboring clan, the Ferreiras. For generations, the two families have quarreled over land. Now they are locked in a series of tit-for-tat assassinations of their sons; an eye-for-an-eye, a tooth-for-a-tooth. Embedded in this choreography of death is a particular code of ethics: "Blood has the same volume for everyone. You have no right to take more blood than was taken from you." Life is suffused with a sense of futility and stoic despair.

Under pressure from his father, Tonho kills one of the Ferreira sons to avenge the murder of his older brother. This act marks him as the next victim. Tonho's younger brother is addressed only as "the Kid" by the family. Anticipating future loss, his parents do not give him a name. The Kid is an imaginative and loving child, whose spirit will not break in the face of harsh parenting, brutalizing isolation, and numbing poverty. The Kid's love encourages Tonho to question his fate. When Tonho meets Clara, a charming itinerant circus girl, all of life's possibilities open up for him.

The film is narrated by "The Kid" who is later given a name by Clara and her stepfather, the traveling circus performers. They call him "Pacu" and he spends the whole film narrating which ultimately drives the viewers to identify and allows the film to humanize the characters.

Later, Pacu and Tonho visit the circus in town, with Tonho forming a relationship with Clara. Clara later leaves her stepfather to be with Tonho, arriving at the farm to be with him. The two sleep together before she departs, telling Tonho to meet her in the east by the ocean. One of the Ferreira men come to the farm in order to exact revenge on the Breves, initially appearing to kill Tonho. However, it is revealed that they actually shot and killed Pacu, devastating the Breves.

The father tells Tonho to get the gun in order to kill all of the remaining Ferreiras in retaliation. Tonho, realizing that his life with his family is destroyed, walks off without a word. His father attempts to shoot him for disregarding the honor of their family, but he is stopped by the mother who insists that the feud no longer matters and that it is over. Tonho arrives on a beach, staring at the sea with an expression of melancholic wonder on his face.

== Cast ==
- José Dumont as the father
- Rodrigo Santoro as Tonio, the eldest son
- Rita Assemany as the Mother
- Ravi Ramos Lacerda as Pacu
- Luiz Carlos Vasconcelos as Salustiano
- Flávia Marco Antonio as Clara
- Everaldo Pontes as Old Blind Man
- Caio Junqueira as Inácio
- Mariana Loureiro as Widow
- Servilio De Holanda as Isaías
- Wagner Moura as Matheus
- Othon Bastos as Mr. Lourenço
- Gero Camilo as Reginaldo
- Vinícius de Oliveira as "the Kid"

== Reception ==
=== Critical response ===
Behind the Sun has an approval rating of 74% on review aggregator website Rotten Tomatoes, based on 46 reviews, and an average rating of 6.7/10. The website's critical consensus states: "Visually poetic, Behind the Sun is a powerful statement about cycles of violence. Metacritic assigned the film a weighted average score of 73 out of 100, based on 19 critics, indicating generally favorable reviews.

=== Awards and nominations ===
BAFTA Film Awards

- Best Film Not in the English Language – Arthur Cohn and Walter Salles (nominated)

Golden Globe Awards

- Best Foreign Language Film (nominated)

Havana Film Festival

- Best Director – Walter Salles (won)
- House of the Americas Award – Walter Salles (won)

Venice Film Festival

- Little Golden Lion – Arthur Cohn and Walter Salles (won)
- Golden Lion – Walter Salles (nominated)

== See also ==
- List of submissions to the 74th Academy Awards for Best Foreign Language Film
- List of Brazilian submissions for the Academy Award for Best Foreign Language Film
