= Banco Central burglary at Fortaleza =

2005 bank heist in Fortaleza, Brazil

Coordinates: 3.7339°S 38.5226°W

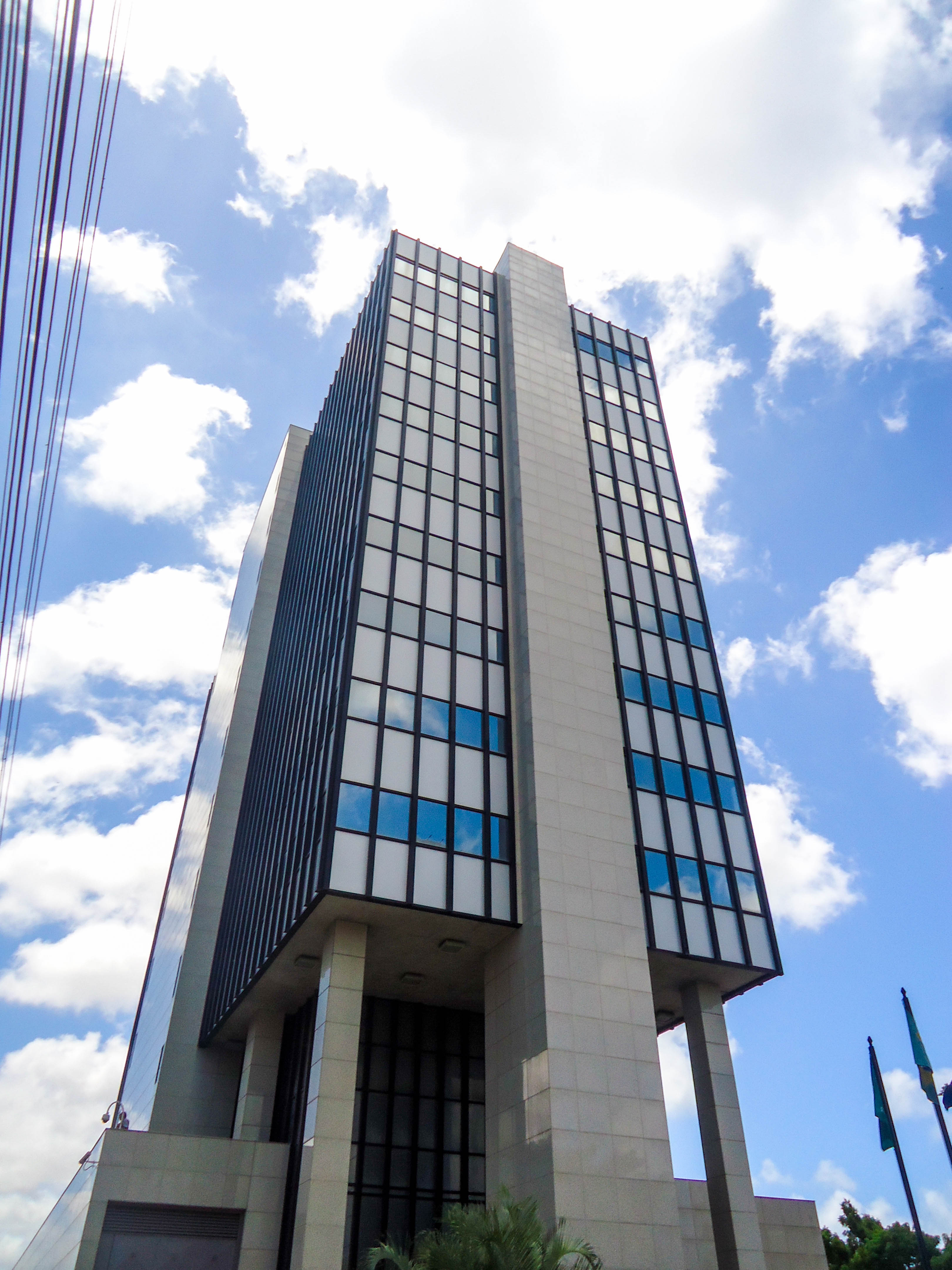
The Central Bank of Brazil in Fortaleza

The Banco Central burglary at Fortaleza was the theft of about R$160 million from the vault of the Banco Central branch located in Fortaleza, in the state of Ceará, Brazil, on August 6, 2005. In the aftermath of the burglary, of the 25 people thought to be involved, only 8 had been arrested, and R$20 million recovered, up to the end of 2005. In addition, several of the gang are thought to have been victims of kidnapping, and one member, Luis Fernando Ribeiro, thought to have been the mastermind of the operation, was killed by kidnappers after a ransom was paid. Arrests and recovery of the money, as well as kidnapping and murder of the perpetrators, have been ongoing. One hundred and twenty nine arrests were made, and 32 million Reais were recovered. The Brazilian Federal Police were also able to prevent other burglaries, as shown in the Netflix documentary "3 Tonelada$: Assalto ao Banco Central".
