= Teatro dos Sete =

Entertainment venue in Brazil

Teatro dos Sete is a theatre in Rio de Janeiro, Brazil. Founded in 1959 by Gianni Ratto, it has featured actors such as Fernanda Montenegro, Henriette Morineau, Sérgio Britto, Ítalo Rossi, and Fernando Torres.
