= Redeemer (2004 film) =

2004 film directed by Cláudio Torres

Redeemer Redentor
- Theatrical release poster
- Directed by: Cláudio Torres
- Written by: João Emanuel Carneiro; Elena Soarez; Cláudio Torres; Fernanda Torres
- Produced by: Cláudio Torres; Leonardo Monteiro de Barros
- Starring: Pedro Cardoso; Miguel Falabella; Camila Pitanga; Stênio Garcia; Fernanda Montenegro
- Cinematography: Ralph Strelow
- Edited by: Vicente Kubrusly
- Music by: Luca Raele; Maurício Tagliari
- Production company: Conspiração Filmes
- Distributed by: Warner Bros. Pictures
- Release date: 10 September 2004
- Running time: 95 minutes
- Country: Brazil
- Language: Portuguese
- Budget: R$ 6,500,000

Redeemer (Portuguese: Redentor) is a 2004 Brazilian drama film, the debut film of director Cláudio Torres.

== Plot ==
In the 1970s, in Rio de Janeiro, the neighborhood of Barra da Tijuca was a kind of promised land. One of several buildings on the site was the Paradise Condominium, a luxury building that would be constructed by the contractor of Dr. Sabóia (José Wilker). Celio, still a child, is impressed with the model of the enterprise, shown by his friend Otávio, son of Dr. Sabóia. With the excitement of the son, his parents decide to buy an apartment in Paradise Condominium, the number 808.

However, despite having paid all the benefits for years, the family of Celio would never occupied the apartment again. This is because Dr. Sabóia, after selling the same apartment several times, bankruptcy and left the work incomplete. Fifteen years later, the workers who worked in the construction of the building created a slum beside the Paradise Condominium, and decided to take possession of the apartments and organize a peaceful invasion. With the real estate scandal coming public, Dr. Sabóia committed suicide and left the business in the hands of Otávio (Miguel Falabella). Celio (Pedro Cardoso), working as a reporter, is assigned to cover the case and thus is forced to reconnect with Otávio. Obsessed with the apartment, Célio accepts the proposal of Otávio of being his stooge, in return for $5 million.

The situation is beyond control, causing Célio to repent the business he've done with Otávio. Desperate and looking for God, Célio ends up finding it. That's when he receives a mission which will also be his salvation: persuade Otávio to give his entire fortune to the poor.

== Cast ==
- Pedro Cardoso as Célio Rocha
- Miguel Falabella as Otávio Sabóia
- Camila Pitanga as Soninha
- Stênio Garcia as Acácio
- Fernanda Montenegro as Dona Isaura
- Fernando Torres as Justo
- Jean Pierre Noher as Gutierrez
- Enrique Diaz as Moraes
- Mauro Mendonça as Noronha
- Tony Tornado as Tonelada
