= Joana da Paz =

Brazilian activist (1925–2023)

- Born: 15 April 1925; Quebrangulo, Alagoas, Brazil
- Died: 22 February 2023 (aged 97); Salvador, Bahia, Brazil
- Known for: Reporting against drug trafficking and police corruption

Joana Zeferino da Paz (15 April 1925 – 22 February 2023), popularly known as Dona Vitória, was a Brazilian activist. She was known for recording, at the age of 80, criminal actions in her neighborhood, contributing to the arrest of dozens of drug traffickers and corrupt police officers. Her real identity was only revealed after her death. She was viewed as a symbol of courage and the fight against criminality.

== Life ==
Joana was born in Quebrangulo in the agreste of Alagoas. She was thrown out and forced to leave the house where she worked as a maid after suffering numerous acts of violence, including rape by a farmer from Alagoas, which resulted in an early pregnancy. Her son died of heart failure before he was two years old. She wandered for a long time before buying an apartment in Ladeira dos Tabajaras favela, in Copacabana, Rio de Janeiro. Joana graduated as a massage therapist from the General Polyclinic of Rio de Janeiro.

For most of her life, she faced the social challenges of living in a favela amidst the violence of drug trafficking. At the age of 80, dissatisfied with the increasing crime rate, she began recording drug trafficking operations, extortion and armed confrontations from her window with a camera. The recordings were handed over to the authorities and became essential evidence in police investigations, resulting in the arrest of approximately 30 people, including drug traffickers and military police officers involved in corruption. For security reasons, Joana was included in the Witness Protection Program and adopted the name "Dona Vitória". She spent the rest of her life anonymously, living in several cities until her death in Salvador on 22 February 2023, at the age of 97.

== Recognition ==
In August 2024, the Legislative Assembly of the State of Rio de Janeiro posthumously awarded Joana Zeferino da Paz the Peace Builder Award, in recognition of her courage and contribution to the promotion of a culture of peace and denunciation of violence.

In 2025, the film Vitória was released in Brazilian cinemas, inspired by her story, directed by Breno Silveira and Andrucha Waddington, starring Fernanda Montenegro in the lead role.

The book Dona Vitória Joana da Paz, written by journalist Fábio Gusmão, was published in 2016 and reissued in 2024, offering a detailed view of her life and legacy.
