= Henriette Morineau =

Brazilian actress of French descent

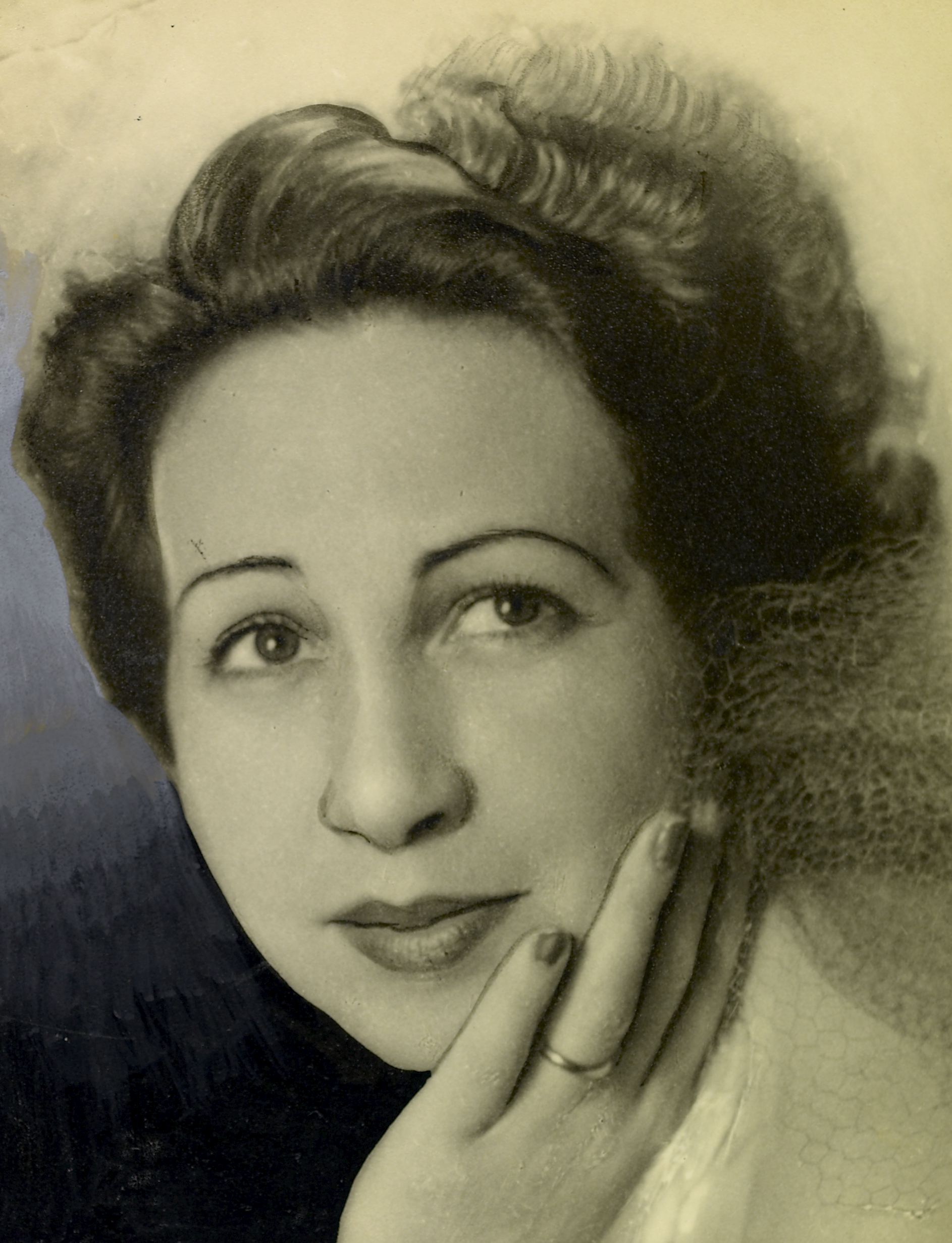
- Born: 29 November 1908; Niort, France
- Died: 3 December 1990 (Aged 82); Rio de Janeiro, Brazil
- Occupation(s): Theatrical director and actress
- Spouse(s): 1. George Morineau; 2. Delorges Caminha
- Children: Antonieta Morineau
- Awards: Order of the Southern Cross, Brazil

Henriette Morineau (1908 – 1990) was a French Brazilian actress who spent most of her working life in Brazil. Primarily focused on theatre, she also appeared in films and two television soap operas.

== Early life ==
Henriette Fernande Zoé Morineau was born in Niort in France on 29 November 1908. She fell in love with literature at school and convinced her stepfather to allow her to study with Henry Mayer in Paris. In 1926 she joined the Conservatoire de Paris. She worked with the Comédie-Française, under the name Henriette Risner, her stepfather's surname, and on one of her tours she met her future husband, George Morineau, in Belgium. He was advised by doctors to move to a tropical country and they decided to settle in Brazil. Henriette arrived in Rio de Janeiro to join him in 1931 and they married five days later.

== Career ==
It was not a successful marriage. Between 1931 and 1942 Morineau did not perform, because her husband would not permit it. However, their daughter, Antonieta Morineau, would also become an actress. Having returned to France, she was then invited by the French actor and director, Louis Jouvet, to take part in a tour of South America with his theatre company. Travelling with her daughter, she stayed in Brazil at the end of the tour and started to work with the company of the actress and director, Bibi Ferreira, performing in Portuguese for the first time. In 1946 she founded the Companhia dos Artistas Unidos (United Artists Company), which she directed for 14 years. In a short time she became a leading figure in Brazilian theatre and cinema, in 1946 receiving a prize from the Brazilian Association of Theatre Critics for her performance in Frénésie by Charles de Peyret-Chappuis. In 1948, she gave the first performance at the Teatro Brasileiro de Comédia in São Paulo, with The Human Voice, a monologue by Jean Cocteau. In 1956 she played in an adaptation of Colette's novel Chéri, which she considered to have been her biggest theatrical success. Actors who worked with her company included Fernanda Montenegro, Beatriz Segall and Jardel Filho.

Morineau divorced her husband and later married the actor and director Delorges Caminha, who died in 1971. After the closure of the Companhia dos Artistas Unidos, Morineau worked with several theatre groups, including Teatro dos Sete, directed by Gianni Ratto. In 1963 she was sent by the Ministry of Foreign Affairs of Brazil on a cultural mission to Portugal, spending eight years there directing, acting and teaching at the National Conservatory. During this assignment she spent more time in Portugal than Brazil. Her last stage performance was around 1982. She preferred the theatre to film or television, being credited with only six film performances, the last being released in 1983. On television, she appeared in two soap operas, Água Viva and Escrava Isaura, a series set during the time of abolition.

== Awards and honours ==
- Morineau was awarded the Order of the Southern Cross for her contribution to Brazilian theatre.
- She was made an honorary Carioca (Citizen of Rio de Janeiro).

== Death ==
Henriette Morineau died on 3 December 1990, in poverty.
