= Vitória (film) =

Brazilian drama film

- Theatrical release poster
- Directed by: Andrucha Waddington; Breno Silveira
- Screenplay by: Paula Fiúza
- Starring: Fernanda Montenegro; Alan Rocha
- Production companies: Globoplay; Conspiração Filmes
- Release date: March 13, 2025
- Country: Brazil
- Language: Portuguese

Vitória is a 2025 Brazilian drama film directed by Andrucha Waddington and Breno Silveira, and written by Paula Fiúza. It was produced by Conspiração Filmes in partnership with the streaming service Globoplay. The film stars Fernanda Montenegro and is based on the book Dona Vitória Joana da Paz, by Fábio Gusmão, which tells the true story of Joana Zeferino da Paz, known by the pseudonym Dona Vitória. The film premiered on March 13, 2025.

== Production ==
The film's director, Breno Silveira, died during the early stages of filming in May 2022. As a result, Andrucha Waddington took over to complete the project. Filming resumed in July of the same year and concluded in December. Dona Vitória, the woman who inspired the story, died in February 2023 at the age of 97, with her real identity being revealed only after her death.

In November 2022, Linn da Quebrada was confirmed as part of the film's cast.

== Cast ==
- Fernanda Montenegro as Dona Nina/Vitória
- Alan Rocha as Fábio Gusmão
- Linn da Quebrada
- Jeniffer Dias
- Sacha Bali
- Laila Garin
- Thelmo Fernandes
- Henrique Manoel Pinho
- Thawan Lucas

== Release ==
The first official trailer for the film was released on October 23, 2024. The film premiered on March 13, 2025 in Brazilian theaters.
