= Memórias Póstumas =

2001 film by André Klotzel

- Theatrical release poster
- Directed by: André Klotzel
- Written by: André Klotzel; José Roberto Torero
- Based on: The Posthumous Memoirs of Bras Cubas by Machado de Assis
- Produced by: André Klotzel
- Starring: Reginaldo Faria; Petrônio Gontijo; Viétia Rocha; Sônia Braga
- Cinematography: Pedro Farkas
- Edited by: André Klotzel
- Music by: Mário Manga
- Production company: Superfilmes
- Distributed by: Lumière
- Release dates: February 14, 2001 (Berlin); August 17, 2001 (Brazil)
- Running time: 102 minutes
- Countries: Brazil; Portugal
- Language: Portuguese
- Budget: R$4.5–5 million
- Box office: R$855,484

Memórias Póstumas (known in English as Posthumous Memoirs and Posthumous Memories) is a 2001 comedy-drama film directed by André Klotzel based on The Posthumous Memoirs of Bras Cubas by Machado de Assis. It follows Brás Cubas, played by Reginaldo Faria and Petrônio Gontijo, as he recounts his life after his death.

== Cast ==
- Reginaldo Faria as Bras Cubas
  - Petrônio Gontijo as young Bras Cubas
- Viétia Rocha as Vírgilia
- Sônia Braga as Marcela
- Otávio Müller as Lobo Neves
- Marcos Caruso as Quincas Borba
- Stepan Nercessian as Bento Cubas
- Débora Duboc as Dona Eusébia
- Walmor Chagas as Dr. Villaça
- Nilda Spencer as Dona Plácida
- Milena Toscano as Eugênia

== Production ==
Klotzel started to adapt the novel and search for sponsors in 1996; the production was done in 1998, and it was shot in 1999. A co-production between Brazil and Portugal, Memórias Póstumas had a budget of about R$4.5–5 million ($2,006,509–2,229,455). It was shot in about 60 filming locations at eight cities, including São Paulo, Rio de Janeiro, Parati, Salvador and Coimbra, which lasted twelve weeks.

== Release and reception ==
Its worldwide premiere occurred at the Panorama section of the 2001 Berlin International Film Festival, and it was well received by the public. Memórias Póstumas competed at the 18th International Film Festival of Kerala, and won five awards at the 29th Festival de Gramado: Best Critic's Choice Film, Best Jury's Choice Film, Best Director, Best Screenplay and Best Supporting Actress for Braga. Its release in Brazil was on August 17, 2001, and it grossed R$855,484 ($381,452) with an attendance of 186,380 people in the 57 theatres in which it was released.

It was also well received by English-language critics. Kate Blackhurst from The Lumière Reader said "I can see why it won several international film awards, and its excellence lies in the fact that it is almost impossible to explain." Variety's Eddie Cockrell "Andre Klotzel revisits distinctive brand of local telenovela melodrama he knows best, with spoofy results that will put pic in demand at fests. Theatrical may be a bit iffier, although vid and tube life will be spry." Writing for The New York Times, Elvis Mitchell stated it has a "hilarious poise", adding that the film "is playful and formal".
