= Fernanda Torres =

Brazilian actress and writer (born 1965)

- Torres at the 82nd Venice International Film Festival in 2025
- Born: Fernanda Pinheiro Monteiro Torres; 15 September 1965 (age 61); Rio de Janeiro, Brazil
- Occupations: Actress; writer
- Years active: 1979–present
- Spouse: Andrucha Waddington (m. 1997)
- Children: 2
- Parents: Fernando Torres (father); Fernanda Montenegro (mother)
- Relatives: Cláudio Torres (brother)

Fernanda Pinheiro Monteiro Torres (Brazilian Portuguese: [feʁˈnɐ̃dɐ ˈtoʁis]; born 15 September 1965) is a Brazilian stage and screen actress and writer renowned for her versatility across both comedic and dramatic roles. She has earned numerous accolades, including a Golden Globe, the Cannes Film Festival Award for Best Actress, a Brazilian Academy Film Award, as well as a nomination for an Academy Award.

Torres received international acclaim for her performance as Eunice Paiva in the drama I'm Still Here (2024). She became the first Brazilian, first South American and first Portuguese-speaking actor to win the Golden Globe Award for Best Actress in a Motion Picture – Drama. She was also nominated for the Academy Award for Best Actress, becoming only the second Brazilian actress to be nominated in that category, the first being her mother, Fernanda Montenegro.

Her debut novel, The End, sold over 200,000 copies in Brazil. It was translated into seven other languages and adapted into a miniseries.

== Career ==
Debuting as an actress at thirteen, Torres established a career that spans more than four decades in theater, television, literature and cinema.

=== Cinema ===
Her film debut was at the age of 17, in 1983, with the film Innocência, based on the work of Viscount of Taunay and directed by Walter Lima Jr. Her next movie A Marvada Carne (1985), by André Klotzel, won her the award for Best Actress at the Gramado Festival. For Love Me Forever or Never (1986) by Arnaldo Jabor, Torres won the Best Actress at the Cannes Film Festival and at the Cuba Film Festival.

Among her 24 film credits, the most notable are: Excuse Me, I'm Going to Fight (1986), Best Actress at the Nantes Film Festival and a special nomination at the Locarno Festival; One Man's War (1991) by Sergio Toledo, alongside Anthony Hopkins and Norma Aleandro; Foreign Land (1996) by Walter Salles and Daniela Thomas; Four Days in September (1997) by Bruno Barreto, nominated as Best Foreign Language Film at the 70th Academy Awards; Gêmeas (1999); Redentor (2004), a film directed by her brother, Cláudio Torres; and The House of Sand (2005), directed by her husband Andrucha Waddington.

In 2024, she played Eunice Paiva in the biographical film I'm Still Here, based on the book of the same name by Marcelo Rubens Paiva and working again with director Walter Salles. For her performance, Torres became the second Brazilian to be nominated for a Golden Globe Award for Best Actress in a Motion Picture – Drama, the first one being her mother Fernanda Montenegro 26 years before her, and also the first Brazilian to win the award. They also became the first mother-daughter duo to be nominated for the Academy Award for Best Actress category since Judy Garland and Liza Minnelli.

In June 2025, Torres was invited to join the Academy of Motion Picture Arts and Sciences.

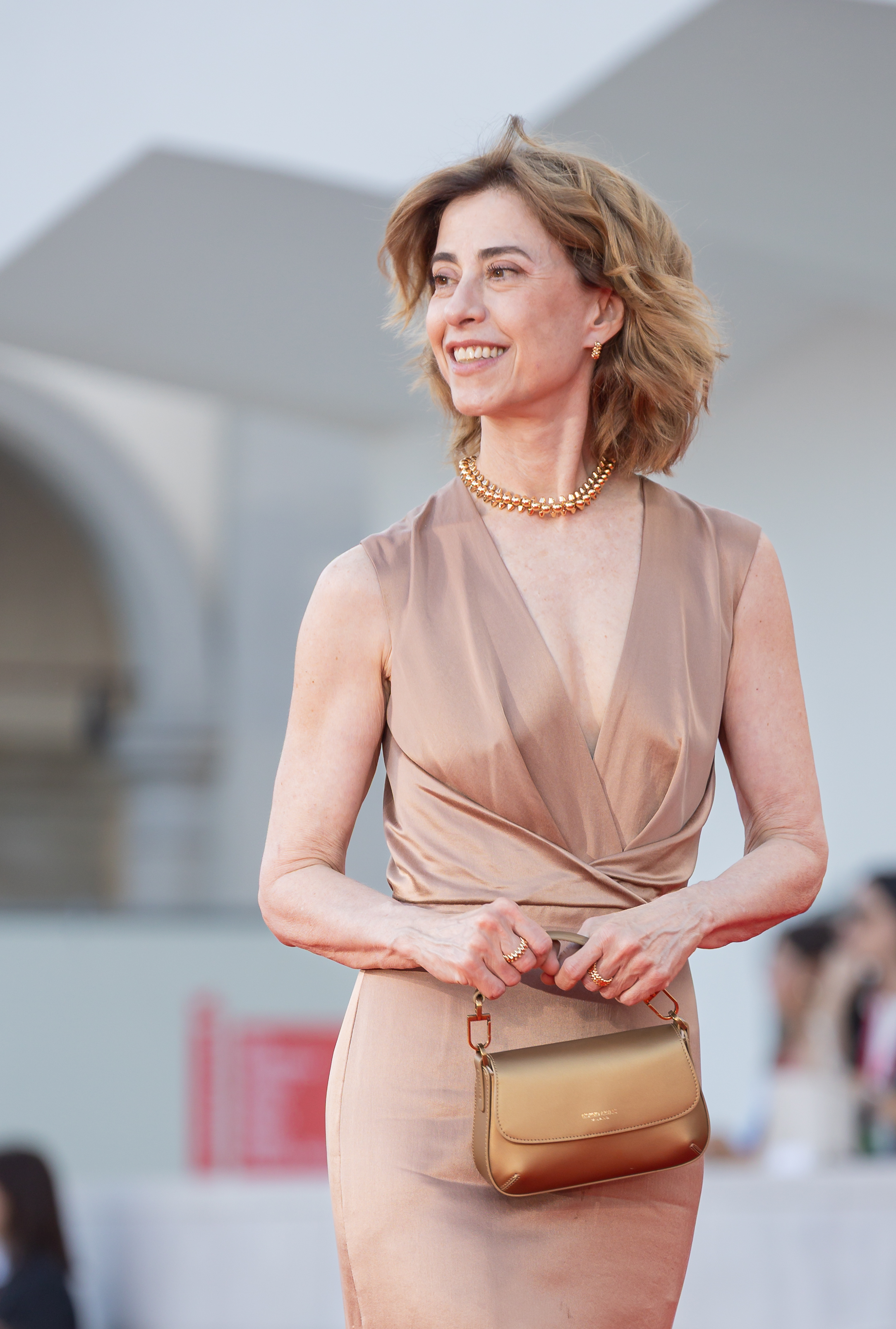
Torres during the 82nd Venice International Film Festival in 2025

=== Theater ===
At thirteen, Torres attended Teatro O Tablado. Her first performance on stage was in 1978, in the play Um Tango Argentino, by Maria Clara Machado. Torres acted in more than a dozen plays, having received praise for works such as Orlando (1989), by Bia Lessa; Da Gaivota (1998), by Daniela Thomas; Two Women and a Corpse (2000), by Aderbal Freire Filho. She was the first actress of the Companhia de Ópera Seca, founded by Gerald Thomas, having starred in three plays, including The Flash and Crash Days (1991)—sharing the stage with her mother—which was presented on tour in the United States and European. The monologue A Casa dos Budas Ditosos, based on the novel of the same name by João Ubaldo Ribeiro, debuted in 2003 reaching more than one million spectators.

=== Television ===
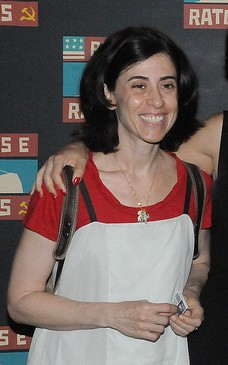
Torres in 2012

On television, she acted in numerous popular comedy series and soap operas in Brazil. From 2001 to 2003, Torres starred with Luiz Fernando Guimarães in the series Os Normais, which showed with humor and innovative language the everyday situations experienced by the couple Rui and Vani. Os Normais became a cult favorite and led many fans to not leave the house on Friday nights before the program ended. Not only the characters' scenes and dialogues, but also the panties and bras worn by Torres won over the public. The success of the series also led to two feature films, Os Normais – O Filme (2003), a prequel telling how Rui and Vani met, and Os Normais 2: A Noite Mais Maluca de Todas (2009), a sequel to the show where Rui and Vani try to reignite their relationship.

From 2011 to 2015, Torres starred, alongside Andréa Beltrão, in the comedy series Tapas & Beijos, for which she received several awards nominations and wins, such as the Best of the Year Award for Best Actress.

In 2016, she wrote the script for the feature film O Juízo, with her mother in the cast. In 2018, Torres was confirmed in the second season of the series Sob Pressão, as Renata, the new hospital administrator.

As a presenter, she developed the project Minha Estupidez and Bicho Homem for television, and the podcast The Playlist of My Life, as an interviewer on Deezer.

=== Writing ===
In 2007, she began writing for newspapers and magazines as a columnist, publishing a weekly column in the newspaper Folha de S.Paulo since 2010.

In 2014, Torres released her first novel, The End (Fim), which sold more than 200,000 copies in Brazil and was translated into seven languages. In 2023, Torres created, wrote and adapted the novel into a 10-episode miniseries for the Brazilian streaming service Globoplay.

In 2017, Torres published her second novel, Glory and Its Litany of Horrors (A Glória e Seu Cortejo de Horrores).

== Personal life ==
Torres is of Portuguese and Italian descent. She is married to movie producer and director Andrucha Waddington. The couple has two sons, Joaquim (b. 2000) and Antônio (b. 2008). She is also stepmother of João (b. 1993) and Pedro (b. 1995), from Andrucha's first marriage.

== Filmography and bibliography ==
=== Film ===
Year	Title	Role	Notes	Ref.
1983	Inocência	Inocência		
1984	Amenic – Entre o Discurso e a Prática		Extra	
1985	A Marvada Carne	Carula		
1985	Madame Cartô		Voice	
1985	Sonho sem Fim	Cigana		
1986	Love Me Forever or Never	The Woman		
1986	Com Licença, Eu Vou à Luta	Eliane Maciel		
1988	A Mulher do Próximo	Isabel		
1988	Fogo e Paixão	Woman eating an apple	Cameo	
1989	Kuarup	Francisca		
1990	Beijo 2348/72	Claudete		
1993	Capitalismo Selvagem	Elisa Medeiros		
1996	The Jew	Brites Cardoso		
1996	Foreign Land	Alex		
1997	Miramar	The Producer		
1997	Four Days in September	Maria Augusta Carneiro / Andréia		
1998	Midnight	Maria		
1998	Traição	Irene		
1999	Gêmeas	Iara / Marilena		
2003	So Normal	Vanilce "Vani" Alencar		
2004	Redeemer	Young Isaura	Also screenwriter	
2005	The House of Sand	Áurea / Maria		
2007	Saneamento Básico	Marina		
2007	Playing	Herself	Documentary	
2009	A Mulher Invisível	Lúcia		
2009	Os Normais 2: A Noite Mais Maluca de Todas	Vanilce "Vani" Alencar		
2017	Os 8 Magníficos	Herself	Documentary	
2018	O Juízo	—N/a	Screenwriter only	
2019	Babenco: Tell Me When I Die	Herself	Documentary	
2019	Lina Bo Bardi: A Marvelous Entanglement	Young Lina Bo Bardi		
2024	I'm Still Here	Eunice Paiva		

=== Television ===
Year	Title	Role	Notes
1979	Aplauso	Soraia	
1981	Baila Comigo	Fauna Rosa França	Telenovela
1981	Brilhante	Marília Newman Carvalho	Telenovela
1983	Parabéns pra Você	Irene	Telenovela
1983	Caso Especial	Clara	Episode: "O Fantasma de Canterville"
1983	Caso Especial	Maria Alice	Episode: "Todas as Mulheres do Mundo"
1983	Eu Prometo	Dayse Ribeiro Cantomaia	Telenovela
1986	Selva de Pedra	Simone Marques / Rosana Reis	Telenovela
1991	One Man's War	Dolly	Television film
1994	Terça Nobre	Diana	Episode: "Comédia da Vida Privada"
1994	Terça Nobre	Dorinha	Episode: "O homem que sabia javanês"
1994	Terça Nobre	Lúcia McCartney	Episode: "Lúcia McCartney"
1995–97	A Comédia da Vida Privada		
1999	Luna Caliente	Dora	
2001	As Filhas da Mãe	Lulu de Luxemburgo (young)	Telenovela
2001–03	Os Normais	Vanilce "Vani" Alencar	
2002	Brava Gente	Jaci	Episode: "Lira Paulistana"
2004	Um Só Coração	Fernanda Montenegro	Episode: "8 de abril"
2004	Sitcom.br	Nana	Episode: "Dia das Mães"
2006	Os Amadores	Alice	Episode: "22 de dezembro"
2008	Sexo Oposto		
2009	Bicho Homem		
2010	Programa Piloto	Renata	
2010	As Cariocas	Cris	Episode: "A Invejosa de Ipanema"
2010	Amoral da História		
2011–15	Tapas & Beijos	Fátima de Souza	
2016	Mister Brau	Bárbara	Episode: "19 de julho"
2016–17	Minha Estupidez		
2017–19	Filhos da Pátria	Maria Teresa Bulhosa	
2018	Sob Pressão	Dr. Renata Gomes	Season 2
2019	Mulheres Fantásticas	Narrator	Voice; Episode: "Hedy Lamarr"
2020	Todas as Mulheres do Mundo	Estela	
2020	Diário de Um Confinado	Leonor	
2020	Amor e Sorte	Lúcia Bóis	
2020	Gilda, Lúcia e o Bode	Lúcia Bóis	Television special
2023	Fim	Celeste	Also creator and writer

=== Books ===
- 2013 – Fim (The End)
- 2017 – A Glória e seu Cortejo de Horrores (Glory and Its Litany of Horrors)

== Awards and nominations ==
Year	Association	Category	Nominated work	Result	Ref
1985	Festival de Gramado	Best Actress	A Marvada Carne	Won	
1986	Three Continents Festival	Best Actress	Com Licença, Eu Vou à Luta	Won	
1986	Cannes Film Festival	Best Actress	Love Me Forever or Never	Won	
1987	International Film Festival of India	IFFI Best Actor Award (Female)	Love Me Forever or Never	Won	
1999	Festival de Brasília	Best Actress	Gêmeas	Won	
2000	Grande Prêmio do Cinema Brasileiro	Best Actress	Traição	Nominated	
2000	São Paulo Art Critics Association	Best Actress	O Primeiro Dia	Won	
2001	Grande Prêmio do Cinema Brasileiro	Best Actress	Gêmeas	Nominated	
2004	Prêmio ACIE de Cinema	Best Actress	So Normal	Nominated	
2006	Guadalajara International Film Festival	Best Actress	The House of Sand	Won	
2024	Celebration of Cinema and Television	Best Actress – International Film	I'm Still Here	Won	
2024	Los Angeles Film Critics Association	Best Lead Performance	I'm Still Here	Runner-up	
2025	Golden Globe Awards	Best Actress in a Motion Picture – Drama	I'm Still Here	Won	
2025	São Paulo Art Critics Association	Best Actress	I'm Still Here	Won	
2025	Satellite Awards	Best Actress in a Motion Picture – Drama	I'm Still Here	Won	
2025	International Cinephile Society	Best Actress	I'm Still Here	Nominated	
2025	Santa Barbara International Film Festival	Virtuoso Award	I'm Still Here	Honored	
2025	Latino Entertainment Journalists’ Film Awards	Best Actress	I'm Still Here	Won	
2025	Gold Derby Film Awards	Best Actress	I'm Still Here	Won	
2025	Academy Awards	Best Actress	I'm Still Here	Nominated	
2025	Platino Awards	Best Actress	I'm Still Here	Won	

== See also ==
- List of Brazilian Academy Award winners and nominees
- List of actors with Academy Award nominations
- List of actors nominated for Academy Awards for non-English performances
