= A Marvada Carne =

1985 film directed by André Klotzel

- Directed by: André Klotzel
- Written by: André Klotzel; CA Sofredini
- Starring: Fernanda Torres; Adilson Barros; Regina Casé
- Cinematography: Pedro Farkas
- Edited by: Alain Fresnot
- Distributed by: Tatu Filmes
- Release date: 1985
- Running time: 77 minutes
- Country: Brazil
- Language: Portuguese

A Marvada Carne is a 1985 Brazilian romantic comedy film directed by André Klotzel and starring Fernanda Torres, Adilson Barros and Regina Casé.

== Cast ==
- Adilson Barros ... Quim
- Fernanda Torres ... Carula
- Dionísio Azevedo ... Nhô Totó
- Geny Prado ... Nhá Policena
- Lucélia Maquiavelli ... Nhá Tomasa
- Nelson Triunfo ... Curupira
- Regina Casé ... Mulher Diaba
- Paco Sanches ... Serafim

== Awards ==
13th Gramado Film Festival

- Best Picture
- Best Actress (Fernanda Torres)
- Best Screenplay (André Klotzel and CA Sofredini)
- Best Director (André Klotzel)
- Best Cinematography (Pedro Farkas)
- Best Editing (Alain Fresnot)
- Best Set Design (Adrian Cooper)
- Best Original Music (Rogério Duprat)
