= 11th International Film Festival of India =

Indian film festival in 1987

- Awarded for: Best of World cinema
- Presented by: Directorate of Film Festivals
- Presented on: 24 January 1987
- Official website: www.iffigoa.org
- Best Feature Film: "Farewell Green Summer"

The 11th International Film Festival of India was held from 10 to 24 January 1987 in New Delhi. This edition of the festival introduced the "Indian Mainstream" section. India's official entry for the Best Foreign Language Film for the Academy Awards in 1986, Swati Mutyam, was screened in the mainstream section.

== Winners ==
- Golden Peacock (Best Film): Golden Peacock Award: "Farewell Green Summer" by Elyer Ishmukhamedov (Russian film)
- Golden Peacock (Best Short Film) Not Awarded
- IFFI Best Actor Award (Male) (Silver Peacock) "Raghubir Yadav" for "Massey Sahib" (Indian film)
- IFFI Best Actor Award (Female) (Silver Peacock) "Fernanda Torres" for "Love Me Forever or Never" (Brazilian film)
