= Reflexões de um Liquidificador =

2010 film directed by André Klotzel

- Directed by: André Klotzel
- Written by: José Antônio de Souza
- Produced by: Rui Pires; André Montenegro
- Starring: Selton Mello; Ana Lúcia Torre
- Cinematography: Ulrich Burtin
- Edited by: Leticia Giffoni
- Music by: Mário Manga
- Production companies: Bras Filmes; Aurora Filmes
- Distributed by: Bras Filmes
- Release date: August 19, 2010
- Running time: 80 minutes
- Country: Brazil
- Language: Portuguese
- Box office: R$ 179.521,29

Reflexões de um Liquidificador (Reflections Of A Blender) is a 2010 Brazilian surrealist dark comedy directed by André Klotzel.

== Plot ==
The film follows the story of Elvira, a housewife with a busy lifestyle. Onofre, her husband, disappeared, and she decides to go to the police to find out about his disappearance. The trajectory of the couple is narrated by Elvira's blender, which came to life when, long ago, Onofre switched its propeller for a much larger one.

== Cast ==
- Selton Mello as the blender
- Ana Lúcia Torre as Elvira
- Germano Haiut as Onofre
- Gorete Milagres as Nurse Teresa
- Marcos Cesana as postman
- Aramis Trindade as Fuinha

== Production and release ==
Reflexões de um Liquidificador commenced to be shot in August 2008 in São Paulo. To attract a bigger public than other Brazilian films of 2010 which had less than 10,000 attendance, Klotzel released it as a road show. It was not a success but grossed R$179,521, and an audience of 24,149 people, while other domestic releases did not achieve 100 viewers. It also guaranteed Klotzel the Best Director Award at the Brazilian Film & Television Festival of Toronto.
