= Ítalo Rossi =

Brazilian actor (1931–2011)

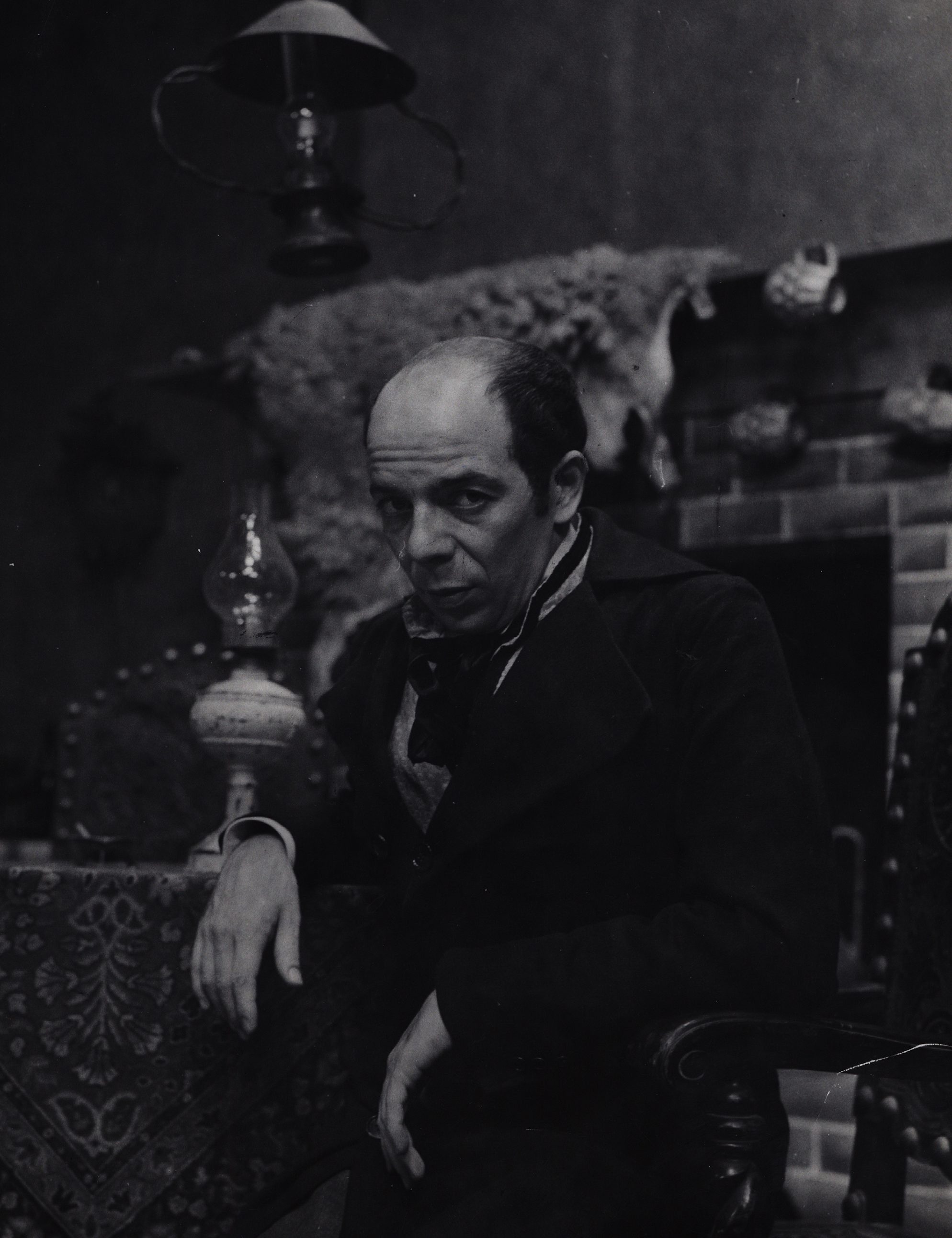
- Rossi in 1959
- Born: 19 January 1931; Botucatu, São Paulo, Brazil
- Died: 2 August 2011 (aged 80); Rio de Janeiro, Brazil
- Years active: 1953–2008

Ítalo Balbo Di Fratti Rossi (19 January 1931 – 2 August 2011) was a Brazilian actor who had a prolific career in Brazilian national television and cinema.

== Career ==
Rossi was born on 19 January 1931 in Botucatu, the son of Italian emigrants Ottorino Humberto Rossi and Iacopina Coppola. Rossi began his prolific career in Rio de Janeiro, working at Theatro Municipal alongside actors Sérgio Britto, Fernando Torres, Fernanda Montenegro, Manoel Carlos, and many others.

In television, Rossi played characters in numerous telenovelas, including Escrava Isaura (1976), Que Rei Sou Eu? (1989), Senhora do Destino (2005–2006), and Belíssima (2005–2006). He also took part in the children's television series Sítio do Picapau Amarelo in 1977. In 2008, Rossi was also cast in the sitcom Toma Lá, Dá Cá.

Rossi's credits in cinema span since 1953 until 2008, having roles in films like The Brave Warrior, María, mãe do filho de Deus (2003), and Sexo com Amor? (2008).

Rossi died in Rio de Janeiro on 2 August 2011 at the age of 80 after being hospitalized due to respiratory problems.

== Selected roles ==
Year	Title	Role	Notes
1953	Esquina da Ilusão		Film
1953	O Homem dos Papagaios		Film
1968	The Brave Warrior	Conrado Frota	
1975	Bravo!	Paes Duarte	TV series
1976	Escrava Isaura	José	TV series
1981–1982	Brilhante	Delegado	TV series
1989	Que Rei Sou Eu?	Marquês de Castilha	
2002	Coração de Estudante	Bonifácio	Special guest
2003	Mãe do Filho de Deus	Caiaphas	Film
2005	Mandrake	Dr. Graff	TV series
2005–2006	Senhora do Destino	Alfred	TV series
2005–2006	Belíssima	Fernando Medeiros	TV series
2008	Sexo Com Amor?	Padre Ancelmo	Film
2008–2009	Toma Lá, Dá Cá	Ladir Miranda	Sitcom
