= André Klotzel =

Brazilian film director

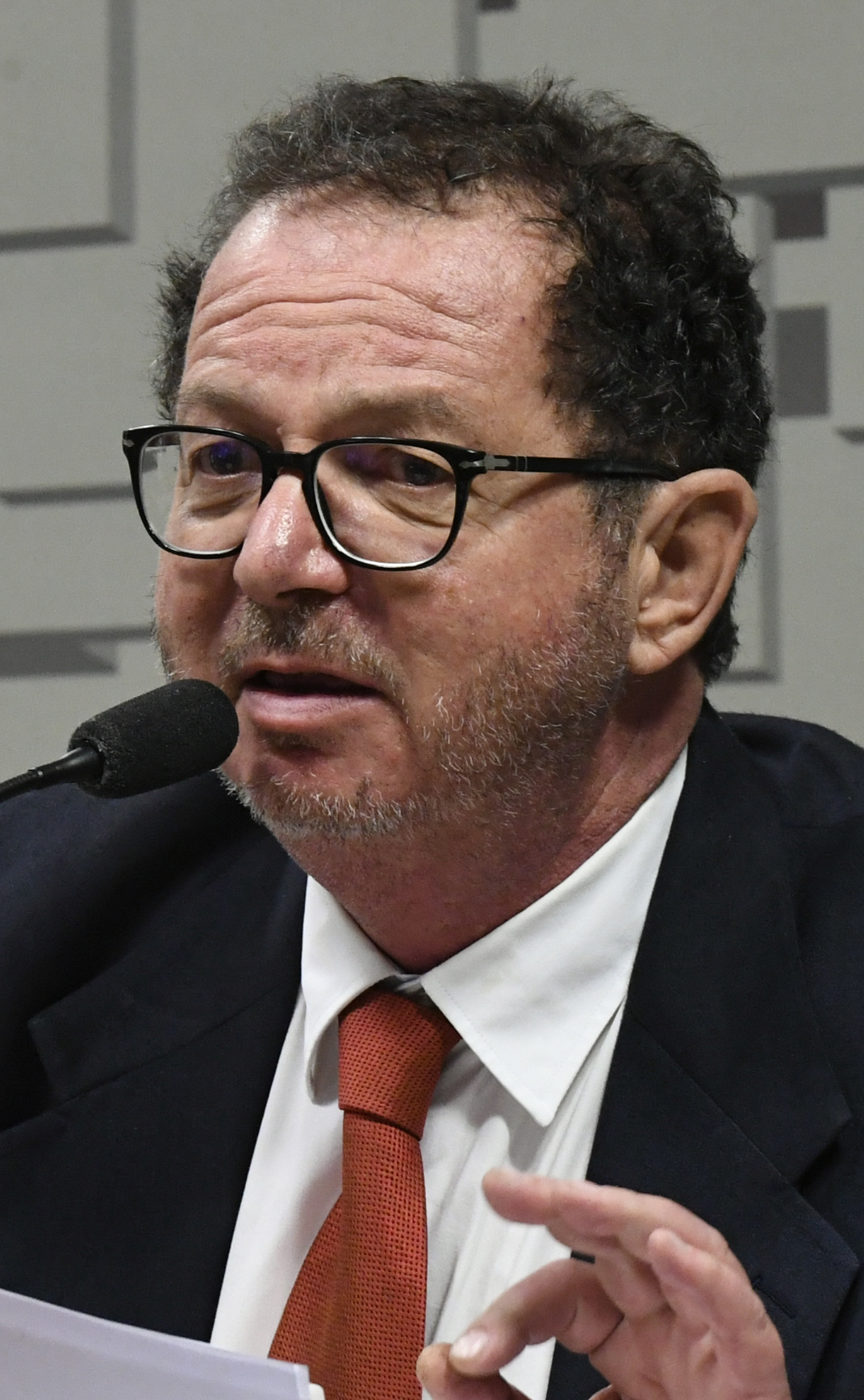
- Born: July 30, 1954 (age 71); São Paulo, Brazil
- Occupations: Director, producer, writer
- Years active: 1976–present

André Klotzel (born July 30, 1954) is a Brazilian film director, producer and screenwriter. Born in São Paulo, Klotzel always enjoyed photography and thus studied it at the School of Communications and Arts at the University of São Paulo in 1973. In the following year, he took an internship to work with Anibal Massaini at the Boca do Lixo and also directed a short film. He worked on several functions, having worked in almost 15 films in the period he was in the college. In 1985, he directed his first feature film, A Marvada Carne, which won the Best Film, Best Screenplay, and Best Director at the Gramado Film Festival. He won the same awards at the same festival film in 2001 for Memórias Póstumas.

== Filmography ==
- Maldita Coincidência (1979; producer)
- Janete (1983; writer)
- A Marvada Carne (1985; director)
- Anjos da Noite (1987; executive producer)
- Capitalismo Selvagem (1993; director)
- Brevísimas Histórias de Gentes de Santos (1996; director; documentary)
- Memórias Póstumas (2001; director)
- Reflexões de um Liquidificador (2010; director)
