= As Cariocas =

Brazilian television series

- DVD cover
- Also known as: The Cariocas
- Genre: Comedy; Drama
- Created by: Euclydes Marinho
- Based on: As Cariocas by Sérgio Porto
- Written by: Euclydes Marinho; Adriana Falcão; Clarice Falcão; Cláudia Tajes; Gregório Duvivier; Marcelo Saback
- Directed by: Daniel Filho; Amora Mautner; Cris D'Amato
- Starring: Alinne Moraes; Adriana Esteves; Paola Oliveira; Fernanda Torres; Cintia Rosa; Sônia Braga; Grazi Massafera; Alessandra Negrini; Deborah Secco; Angélica
- Narrated by: Daniel Filho
- Opening theme: "Mulher Carioca" (Bela Fera)" by Pedro Luís e a Parede
- Country of origin: Brazil
- Original language: Portuguese
- No. of seasons: 1
- No. of episodes: 10

Production
- Production locations: Rio de Janeiro, Brazil
- Camera setup: Multi-camera
- Running time: 30 minutes
- Production company: Estúdios Globo

Original release
- Network: Rede Globo
- Release: 19 October – 21 December 2010

Related
- As Brasileiras

As Cariocas (English: The Cariocas) is a 2010 Brazilian television series written by Euclydes Marinho, based on Sérgio Porto's novel of the same name. It aired on Rede Globo from 19 October 2010 to 21 December 2010. The series consists of 10 independent episodes, each one starring a different actress and set in a different neighborhood of Rio de Janeiro.

A spin-off entitled As Brasileiras was produced and aired by Rede Globo in 2012.

== Premise ==
As Cariocas is inspired by the novel of the same name by Sérgio Porto, written under the pseudonym Stanislaw Ponte Preta in 1967, and tells the story of 10 beautiful women from different Neighborhoods of Rio de Janeiro.

== Cast ==
- Alinne Moraes
- Adriana Esteves
- Paola Oliveira
- Fernanda Torres
- Cintia Rosa
- Sônia Braga
- Grazi Massafera
- Alessandra Negrini
- Deborah Secco
- Angélica

== Episodes ==
| No. | Title | Directed by | Written by | Original release date | Brazil viewers (Rating points) |
|---|---|---|---|---|---|
| 1 | "A Noiva do Catete" | Daniel Filho | Euclydes Marinho & Adriana Falcão | 19 October 2010 | 19 |
Nadia plays the perfect girl. Her fiancé, Carlinhos, was left paraplegic when he saved her from a robbery. Nadia's desire to marry him and have children with him does not stop her from making her escapes. Cast : Alinne Moraes as Nadia, Ângelo Antônio as Carlinhos, Pedro Nercessian as Nelsinho, Nelson Baskerville as Fagundes, Theresa Amayo as Dona Zeni
| 2 | "A Vingativa do Méier" | Cris D'Amato | Cláudia Tajes & Marcelo Saback | 26 October 2010 | 19 |
Celi has been married for five years and is extremely prudish, but she suspects that her husband's lack of desire is a sign that he is cheating on her. Celi then seeks revenge in the same way. Cast : Adriana Esteves as Celi, Aílton Graça as Djalma, Agildo Ribeiro as Alberto, Bárbara Paz as Denise, Myrian Pérsia as Jacira
| 3 | "A Atormentada da Tijuca" | Amora Mautner | Euclydes Marinho | 2 November 2010 | 19 |
Clarissa is newly divorced and has no patience for flirting. The only man she doesn't despise is a friend, a dance teacher. At one point, she decides to put an end to the harassment she receives from her bosses and co-workers. Cast : Paola Oliveira as Clarissa, Gabriel Braga Nunes as Gilberto "Giba", Denise Dumont as Taci, Ana Ferraz as Amélia, Charles Fricks as Heitor, Fernando Ceylão as Jorge, Henrique Neves as Sr. Raul, Maria Mariana as Betânia
| 4 | "A Invejosa de Ipanema" | Daniel Filho & Amora Mautner | Euclydes Marinho & Adriana Falcão | 9 November 2010 | 14 |
Cris is a high society woman who, besides always envying someone, has the difficult task of reconciling business with glamour and mistresses. Married to Gustavo, the pinnacle of her envy is a convertible. And she does everything she can to get it. Cast : Fernanda Torres as Cris, Luiz Gustavo as Gustavo, Guilherme Fontes as Luiz Felipe Magalhães, Rafael Primot as Chiquinho Prado, Lavínia Vlasak as Julinha
| 5 | "A Internauta da Mangueira" | Cris D'Amato | Euclydes Marinho & Adriana Falcão | 16 November 2010 | N/A |
Beautiful Gleicy has been married for two years to Armando, but he complains that she never leaves the computer. Armando doesn't realize that his wife drives men crazy on the Internet. Cast : Cintia Rosa as Gleicy, Eduardo Moscovis as Armando, André Gonçalves as Leleco, Flávio Bauraqui as Edimilsson, Preta Gil as Gláucia, Marcos Winter as Élber, Fernando Caruso as Ivan, Babu Santana as Salesman at Maracanã
| 6 | "A Adúltera da Urca" | Daniel Filho & Cris D'Amato | Euclydes Marinho & Adriana Falcão | 23 November 2010 | 18 |
Julia is the exemplary housewife, wife and employee. Only she ends up discovering that she loved one of the things she despised the most: seducing men who were not her husband. Cast : Sônia Braga as Júlia, Antônio Fagundes as Carlos Faria "Cacá", Regina Duarte as Maria Elisa "Malu", Dalton Vigh as Giuliano
| 7 | "A Desinibida do Grajaú" | Cris D'Amato | Clarice Falcão & Gregório Duvivier & Adriana Falcão | 30 November 2010 | N/A |
Michelle, after losing everything, is forced to return to her parents' home in Grajaú. Used to the perks of the South Zone, she does not surrender to the customs of the traditional North Zone neighborhood and scandalizes the neighborhood. Cast : Grazi Massafera as Michelle, Carla Daniel as Esperança, Aramis Trindade as Eugênio, Chico Tenreiro as Seu Arnaldo, Fernando Eiras as Walther, Bernardo Castro Alves as Ismaelzinho, Isabela Garcia as Dona Irene, Alice Borges as Lourdes, Joana Fomm as Denise, Marcelo D2 as Wescley
| 8 | "A Iludida de Copacabana" | Amora Mautner | Euclydes Marinho & Adriana Falcão | 7 December 2010 | 21 |
Marta likes to show that she is well married to a tremendous handsome man. But the marriage, happy only in appearance, is shaken when she meets her husband's best friend. Cast : Alessandra Negrini as Marta, Thiago Lacerda as Silvinho, Eriberto Leão as Eduardo, Roberta Rodrigues as Suellen
| 9 | "A Suicida da Lapa" | Daniel Filho | Clarice Falcão & Gregório Duvivier | 14 December 2010 | 16 |
Alice is a young woman who loves to reinvent herself. Still, she is dissatisfied with her own life. She ends up having a relationship with one of her husband's co-workers and they plan a rather shady encounter. Cast : Deborah Secco as Alice, Cássio Gabus Mendes as Roberto
| 10 | "A Traída da Barra" | Daniel Filho | Adriana Falcão | 21 December 2010 | 21 |
After catching her husband in bed with her best friend, Maria Teresa freaks out and seeks help from prostitutes to get revenge on her unfaithful husband. Cast : Angélica as Maria Teresa, Luciano Huck as Cícero, Luís Miranda as Margarete, Rosi Campos as Penélope, Leona Cavalli as Rita, André Dias as Fernando, Marcelo Saback as Barman, Serjão Loroza as Segurança, Miguel Nader as Cadú, Fernanda Pontes as Suzana

== Reception ==
Patrícia Kogut of O Globo said that As Cariocas "has impeccable photography, inspired track sound and a good direction."

O Estado de S. Paulo said that As Cariocas, "premieres with a cast of beautiful actresses," and that "Daniel Filho re-creates the universe of the characters of Sérgio Porto with bossa."
