= Fernando Torres (actor) =

Brazilian actor (1927–2008)

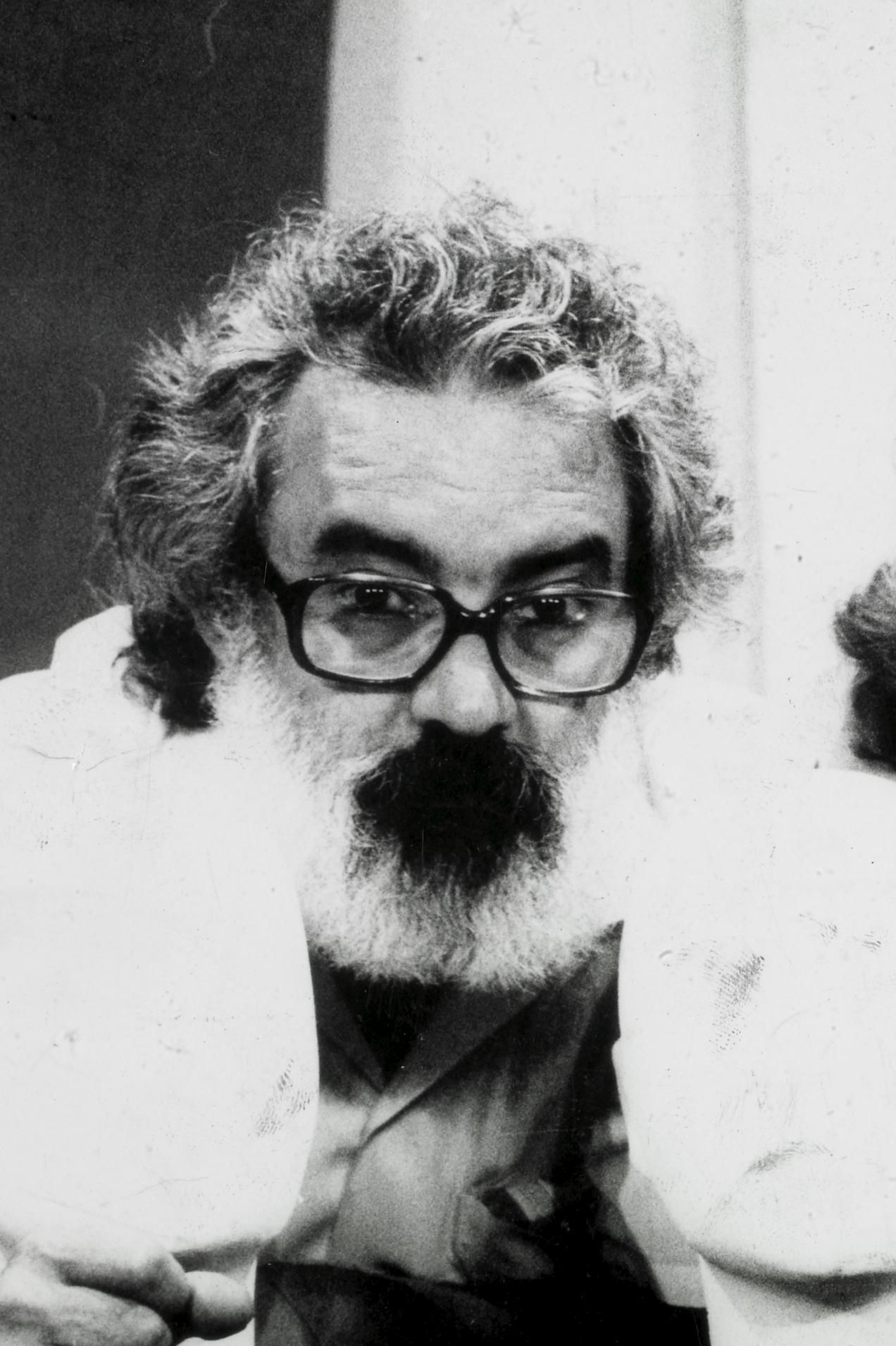
- Torres in 1972
- Born: Fernando Monteiro Torres; 14 November 1927; Guaçuí, Espírito Santo, Brazil
- Died: 4 September 2008 (aged 80); Rio de Janeiro, Brazil
- Occupations: Actor; filmmaker
- Spouse: Fernanda Montenegro (m. 1953)
- Children: Cláudio Torres; Fernanda Torres
- Relatives: Andrucha Waddington (son-in-law)

Fernando Monteiro Torres (Brazilian Portuguese: [feʁˈnɐ̃du ˈtoʁis]; 14 November 1927 – 4 September 2008) was a Brazilian actor, as well as a television, film and theatre director and producer. Torres' career in Brazilian film, stage and television spanned more than five decades. He was best known to international movie audiences for his supporting role as Americo in the 1985 film Kiss of the Spider Woman, which won several awards. He founded the Teatro dos Sete in 1959.

Born in Guaçuí, Espírito Santo, Torres was married to Academy Award-nominated Brazilian actress Fernanda Montenegro from 1953 until his death. The couple had two children together, film director Cláudio Torres and actress Fernanda Torres.

Fernando Torres died in his home in Rio de Janeiro of pulmonary emphysema on 4 September 2008, at the age of 80.

== Filmography ==
=== Television ===
Television actor

- Laços de Família (2000) - Aléssio Lacerda
- Zazá (1997) - Brigadeiro
- Amor com Amor Se Paga (1984) - Tio Romão
- Louco Amor (1983) - Alfredo
- Sétimo Sentido (1982) - Harold Bergman
- Terras do Sem Fim (1981)
- Baila Comigo (1981) - Plínio Miranda
- Simplesmente Maria (1970)
- A Gordinha (1970)
- Dez Vidas (1969) - Cláudio Manoel da Costa
- Vitória (1964)
- Pouco Amor Não É Amor (1963)
- A Morte Sem Espelho (1963)

=== Television director ===
- Minha Doce Namorada (1971)
- Ana (1968)
- Paixão de Outono (1965)
- Coração (1964)
- O Desconhecido (1964)
- Pouco Amor Não É Amor (1963)
- A Morte Sem Espelho (1963)

=== Film actor ===
- Redentor (2004)
- Ação Entre Amigos (1998)
- A Ostra e o Vento (1997)
- Veja Esta Canção (1994)
- Kiss of the Spider Woman (O Beijo da Mulher Aranha) (1985)
- Inocência (1983)
- Tudo Bem (1978)
- Marília e Marina (1976)
- O Descarte (1973)
- Eu Transo...Ela Transa (1972)
- Os Inconfidentes (1972)
- Matei Por Amor (1971)
- A Penúltima Donzela (1969)
- Golias Contra o Homem das Bolinhas (1969)
- Em Busca do Tesouro (1967)
- Jerry - A grande parada (1967)
- Engraçadinha Depois dos Trinta (1966)
- Star Without Light (1953)
- A Mulher de Longe (1949)
