= Love Me Forever or Never =

1986 film

- Theatrical release poster
- Directed by: Arnaldo Jabor
- Written by: Arnaldo Jabor
- Produced by: Hélio Paulo Ferraz; Arnaldo Jabor
- Starring: Fernanda Torres; Thales Pan Chacon
- Cinematography: Lauro Escorel
- Edited by: Mair Tavares
- Production companies: Sagitário Filmes; Embrafilme
- Distributed by: Embrafilme
- Release date: 17 April 1986
- Running time: 110 minutes
- Country: Brazil
- Language: Portuguese

Love Me Forever or Never (Portuguese: Eu Sei que Vou Te Amar) is a 1986 Brazilian drama film directed by Arnaldo Jabor. The film stars Fernanda Torres and Thales Pan Chacon.

The film screened at Cannes Festival, where it was selected for the main exhibition, competing for the Palme d'Or for Best Film. Fernanda Torres received the Prix d'interprétation féminine, becoming the first Brazilian actress to win the prize. It was commercially released on April 17, 1986.

== Plot ==
Love Me Forever or Never is a psychological drama with Fernanda Torres as a newly separated woman with one child who meets her husband, Thales Pan Chacon, for a heart-to-heart discussion. They examine their feelings for one another and look back on their relationship while arguing and talking about their fears, insecurities, pleasures, and hopes.

== Cast ==
- Fernanda Torres
- Thales Pan Chacon
- Paulo Henrique Souto

== Production ==
Love Me Forever or Never was shot in Rio de Janeiro.

== Reception ==
- 1986 Cannes Film Festival where Fernanda Torres won the award for Best Actress.
- IFFI Best Actor Award (Female) for Fernanda Torres at the 11th International Film Festival of India
