= Esley (footballer) =

Brazilian footballer (born 1979)

Personal information
- Full name: Esley Leite do Nascimento
- Date of birth: April 15, 1979 (age 47)
- Place of birth: Espírito Santo, Brazil
- Height: 1.76 m (5 ft 9 1/2 in)
- Position: Attacking midfielder

Senior career*
| Years | Team | Apps | (Gls) |
| 1999–2000 | Ituano | | |
| 2001 | Atlético Sorocaba | | |
| 2002 | Paraná | | |
| 2002–2003 | Kriens | | |
| 2004 | Anapolina | | |
| 2004–2005 | Santa Clara | 15 | (1) |
| 2005 | Anapolina | 11 | (4) |
| 2006 | Portuguesa | 7 | (0) |
| 2007 | CRAC | | |
| 2007–2008 | Gama | 44 | (9) |
| 2008–2009 | Grêmio Prudente | 40 | (2) |
| 2009–2010 | Ceará | 20 | (2) |
| 2010 | → Ipatinga (loan) | | |
| 2010 | → América de Natal (loan) | 17 | (0) |
| 2011 | Mirassol | 5 | (0) |
| 2011 | Fortaleza | 7 | (3) |
| 2011 | Bragantino | 13 | (0) |
| 2012 | Mirassol | 16 | (3) |
| 2012–2013 | Fortaleza | 77 | (2) |
| 2014–2020 | São Caetano | 178 | (5) |
| 2020–2021 | Rio Branco-ES | 27 | (0) |
| 2021 | Capixaba | 8 | (0) |
| 2022–2023 | Desportiva Ferroviária | 27 | (0) |
| 2023 | Capixaba | 2 | (0) |
- * Club domestic league appearances and goals as of April 15, 2014

Esley Leite Nascimento, better known as Esley (Victoria, April 15, 1979), is a Brazilian footballer.

== Contract ==
- Ceará.
