= 1986 Cannes Film Festival =

- Official poster of the 39th Cannes Film Festival
- Opening film: Pirates
- Closing film: El amor brujo
- Location: Cannes, France
- Founded: 1946
- Awards: Palme d'Or: The Mission
- No. of films: 20 (In Competition)
- Festival date: 8 May 1986 – 19 May 1986
- Website: festival-cannes.com/en

Cannes Film Festival
- 1987 1985

The 39th Cannes Film Festival took place from 8 to 19 May 1986. American filmmaker Sydney Pollack served as jury president for the main competition. British filmmaker Roland Joffé won the Palme d'Or, the festival's top prize, for the drama film The Mission.

The festival opened with Pirates by Roman Polanski, and closed with El amor brujo by Carlos Saura.

== Juries ==
=== Main competition ===
- Sydney Pollack, American filmmaker, producer, and actor - Jury President
- Charles Aznavour, French-Armenian musician
- Sônia Braga, Brazilian actress
- Lino Brocka, Filipino filmmaker
- Tonino Delli Colli, Italian cinematographer
- Philip French, English film critic and producer
- Alexandre Mnouchkine, French-Russian producer
- István Szabó, Hungarian filmmaker
- Danièle Thompson, French filmmaker
- Alexandre Trauner, Hungarian-French production designer

=== Camera d'Or ===
- Anne Fichelle - Jury President
- Christophe Ghristi, cinephile
- Lawrence Kardish cinephile
- Serge Leroy, French filmmaker
- Pierre Murat, film critic
- Ivan Starcevic, journalist
- Eva Zaoralova, journalist

== Official selection ==
=== In Competition ===
The following feature films competed for the Palme d'Or:

English title	Original title	Director(s)	Production country
After Hours		Martin Scorsese	United States
Boris Godunov	Борис Годунов	Sergei Bondarchuk	Soviet Union, Poland, Czechoslovakia, West Germany
Evening Dress	Tenue de soirée	Bertrand Blier	France
Down by Law		Jim Jarmusch	United States
The Fringe Dwellers		Bruce Beresford	Australia
Fool for Love		Robert Altman	United States
Genesis		Mrinal Sen	India
I Love You		Marco Ferreri	France, Italy
The Last Image	الصور الأخير	Mohammed Lakhdar-Hamina	Algeria
Love Me Forever or Never	Eu Sei Que Vou Te Amar	Arnaldo Jabor	Brazil
Max, My Love	Max mon amour	Nagisa Ōshima	France, United States, Japan
The Mission		Roland Joffé	United Kingdom
Mona Lisa		Neil Jordan	United Kingdom
Otello		Franco Zeffirelli	Italy, Netherlands
Poor Butterfly	Pobre mariposa	Raúl de la Torre	Argentina
Rosa Luxemburg		Margarethe von Trotta	West Germany
Runaway Train		Andrei Konchalovsky	United States
The Sacrifice	Offret	Andrei Tarkovsky	Sweden, United Kingdom, France
Scene of the Crime	Le lieu du crime	André Téchiné	France
Thérèse		Alain Cavalier	France

=== Un Certain Regard ===
The following films were selected for the Un Certain Regard section:

English title	Original title	Director(s)	Production country
A Girl's Own Story		Jane Campion	Australia
Backlash		Bill Bennett	Australia
Belizaire the Cajun		Glen Pitre	United States
Burke & Wills		Graeme Clifford	Australia
Coming Up Roses	Rhosyn a Rhith	Stephen Bayly	United Kingdom
Das zweite Schraube-Fragment		Walter Andreas Christen	Austria
Desert Bloom		Eugene Corr	United States
Laputa		Helma Sanders-Brahms	West Germany
Man of Ashes	ريح السد	Nouri Bouzid	Tunisia
Passionless Moments		Jane Campion and Gerard Lee	Australia
A Promise	人間の約束	Yoshishige Yoshida	Japan
The Pied Piper	Krysař	Jiří Barta	Czechoslovakia, West Germany
Ricochets	שתי אצבעות מצידון	Eli Cohen	Israel
Salomè		Claude d'Anna	Italy, France
Sunrise	日出	Yu Benzheng	China
Two Friends		Jane Campion	Australia
The Unknown Soldier	Tuntematon sotilas	Rauni Mollberg	Finland
Welcome in Vienna	Wohin und zurück - Teil 3: Welcome in Vienna	Axel Corti	Austria
Where Are You Going?	За къде пътувате?	Rangel Vulchanov	Bulgaria

=== Out of Competition ===
The following films were selected to be screened out of competition:

English title	Original title	Director(s)	Production country
Absolute Beginners		Julien Temple	United Kingdom
El amor brujo (closing film)		Carlos Saura	Spain
The Color Purple		Steven Spielberg	United States
Don Quixote (unfinished)		Orson Welles	Spain, Italy, United States
Hannah and Her Sisters		Woody Allen	United States
A Matter of Life and Death (1946)		Michael Powell and Emeric Pressburger	United Kingdom
A Man and a Woman: 20 Years Later	Un homme et une femme: Vingt ans déjà	Claude Lelouch	France
Pirates (opening film)		Roman Polanski	France, Tunisia, Poland
Precious Images (short)		Chuck Workman	United States
You've Got Beautiful Stairs, You Know (short)	T'as de beaux escaliers tu sais	Agnès Varda	France

=== Short Films Competition ===
The following short films competed for the Short Film Palme d'Or:

- 15-Août by Nicole Garcia (France)
- Heiduque by Y. Katsap, L. Gorokhov (Russia)
- A Gentle Spirit (Lagodna) by Piotr Dumala
- Le Vent by Csaba Varga
- Les Petites Magiciennes by Vincent Mercier, Yves Robert (France)
- Les Petits Coins by Pascal Aubier
- Miroir d'ailleurs by Willy Kempeneers
- Nouilles Sèches (Dry Noodles) by Dan Collins
- Peel by Jane Campion (Australia)
- Question d'optiques by Claude Luyet
- Quinoscopio by Juan Padron
- Street of Crocodiles by Brothers Quay
- Turbo Concerto by Martin Barry

== Parallel sections ==
=== International Critics' Week ===
The following feature films were screened for the 25th International Critics' Week (25e Semaine de la Critique):

- 40 Square Meters of Germany (40 Quadratmeter Deutschland) by Tevfik Baser (West Germany)
- Devil in the Flesh by Scott Murray (Australia)
- La Dona del traghetto by Amedeo Fago (Italy)
- Esther by Amos Gitaï (Israel)
- Faubourg Saint-Martin by Jean-Claude Guiguet (France)
- San Antoñito by Pepe Sanchez (Colombia)
- Sleepwalk by Sara Driver (United States)

=== Directors' Fortnight ===
The following films were screened for the 1986 Directors' Fortnight (Quinzaine des Réalizateurs):

- Cactus by Paul Cox
- Comic Magazine (Komikku Zasshi Nanka Iranai) by Yōjirō Takita
- Dancing in the Dark by Leon Marr
- The Decline of the American Empire (Le Déclin de l'empire américain) by Denys Arcand
- Defence of the Realm by David Drury
- Devil in the Flesh (Diavolo in corpo) by Marco Bellocchio
- Giovanni Senzapensieri by Marco Colli
- Golden Eighties by Chantal Akerman
- Malandro (Ópera do Malandro) by Ruy Guerra
- Memoirs of a Sinner by Wojciech Has
- Qing Chun Jin by Nuanxin Zhang
- Schmutz by Paulus Manker
- She's Gotta Have It by Spike Lee
- Sid and Nancy by Alex Cox
- Sorekara by Yoshimitsu Morita
- Tarot by Rudolf Thome
- Visszaszamlalas by Pal Erdoss
- Working Girls by Lizzie Borden

== Official Awards ==
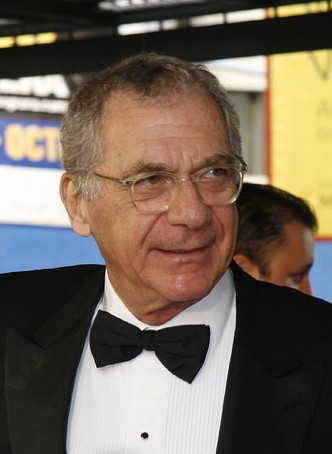
Sydney Pollack, Jury President

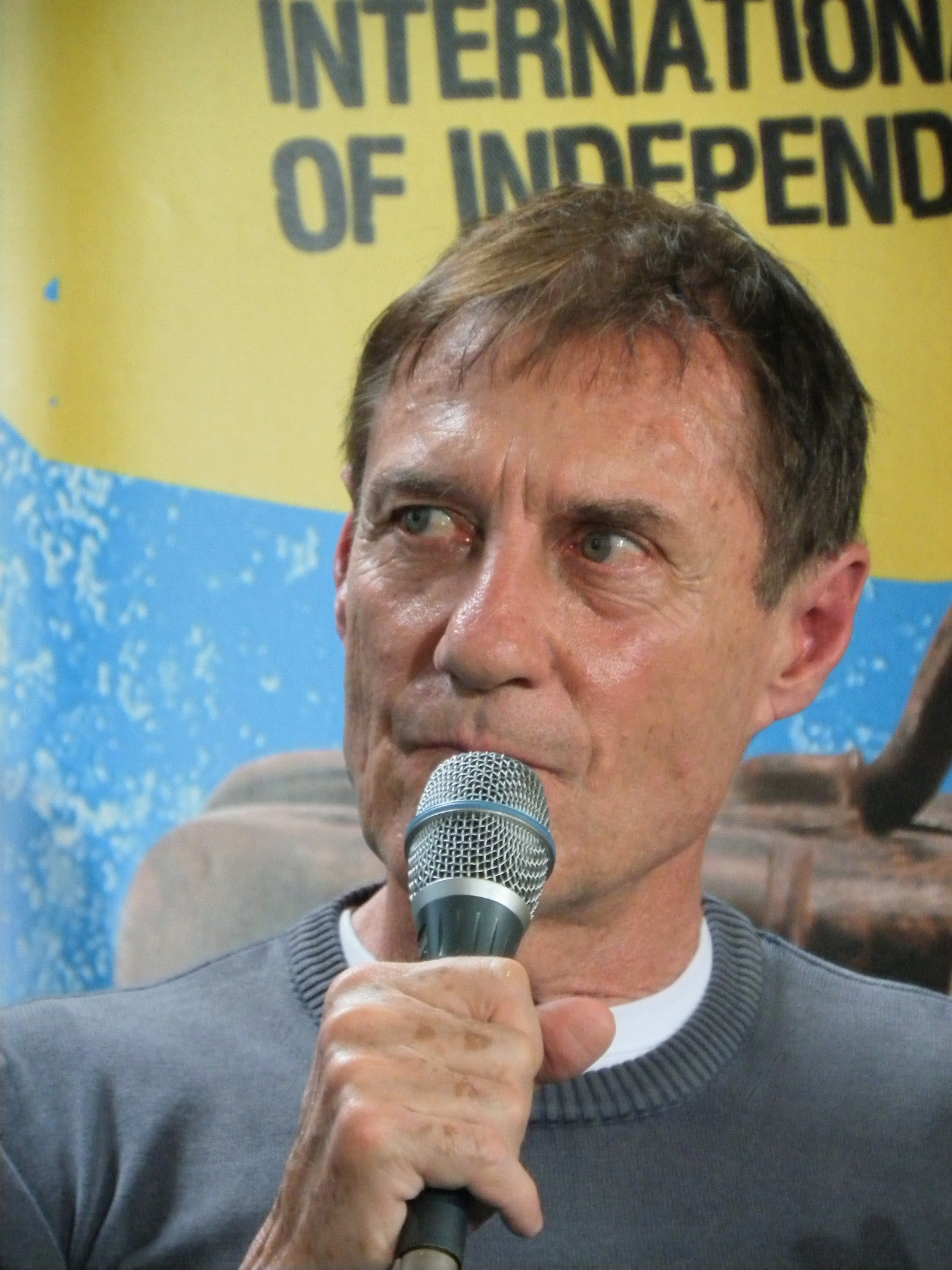
Roland Joffé, Palme d'Or winner

=== In Competition ===
- Palme d'Or: The Mission by Roland Joffé
- Grand Prix: The Sacrifice by Andrei Tarkovsky
- Best Director: Martin Scorsese for After Hours
- Best Actress:
  - Barbara Sukowa for Rosa Luxemburg
  - Fernanda Torres for Love Me Forever or Never
- Best Actor:
  - Michel Blanc for Evening Dress
  - Bob Hoskins for Mona Lisa
- Best Artistic Contribution: Sven Nykvist (cinematography) for The Sacrifice
- Jury Prize: Thérèse by Alain Cavalier

=== Caméra d'Or ===
- Noir et Blanc by Claire Devers

=== Short Film Palme d'Or ===
- Peel by Jane Campion
- Jury Prize for Fiction: Les Petites Magiciennes by Vincent Mercier and Yves Robert
- Jury Prize for Animation: Heiduque by Y. Katsap, L. Gorokhov

== Independent Awards ==
=== FIPRESCI Prizes ===
- The Decline of the American Empire by Denys Arcand (Directors' Fortnight)
- The Sacrifice by Andrei Tarkovsky (In competition)

=== Commission Supérieure Technique ===
- Technical Grand Prize: The Mission by Roland Joffé

=== Prize of the Ecumenical Jury ===
- The Sacrifice by Andrei Tarkovsky
  - Special Mention: Thérèse by Alain Cavalier

=== Award of the Youth ===
- Foreign Film: She's Gotta Have It by Spike Lee
- French Film: High Speed by Monique Dartonne and Michel Kaptur

== Media ==
- INA: Roman Polanski presents Pirates at the opening of the 1986 Festival (interview in French)
- INA: List of winners of the 1986 festival (commentary in French)
