= Viétia Zangrandi =

Brazilian actress

- Born: Viétia Zangrandi Rocha; July 12, 1970 (age 56); Aracaju, Sergipe, Brazil
- Occupation: Actor
- Years active: 1994-presents

Viétia Zangrandi is the stage name of Viétia Zangrandi Rocha, a Brazilian actress who works in TV, film and theater. She was born in Aracaju, Sergipe, Brazil on 12 July 1970.

The actress was in the cast of the Brazilian version of Desperate Housewives, Donas de Casa Desesperadas in partnership with the Disney with the RedeTV!; her role was Elisa Fernandes, perfect mother and desperate housewife. In the original version, the role was Bree Van de Kamp, played by Marcia Cross.

In television, she had roles in the Brazilian telenovelas Páginas da Vida, Um Anjo Caiu do Céu, Celebridade, Belíssima, América, Amor e Ódio, Pequena Travessa and Seus Olhos. She also acted in films such as Memórias Póstumas and Bocage, o Triunfo do Amor, and in advertising campaigns.

She holds a degree in scenic arts from UNICAMP (University of Campinas).
