= Affonso Arinos de Mello Franco =

Brazilian diplomat and journalist

Affonso Arinos de Mello Franco (November 11, 1930 – March 15, 2020) was a Brazilian diplomat and journalist. He was born in Belo Horizonte on November 11, 1930. His parents were Affonso Arinos de Mello Franco and Anna Guilhermina Pereira de Mello Franco. He was grandnephew of Afonso Arinos. He obtained a Bachelor's Degree in Legal and Social Sciences at the National Faculty of Law from the University of Brazil, in 1949–1953. He was a member of the Brazilian Academy of Letters.
