= Andrucha Waddington =

Brazilian film director

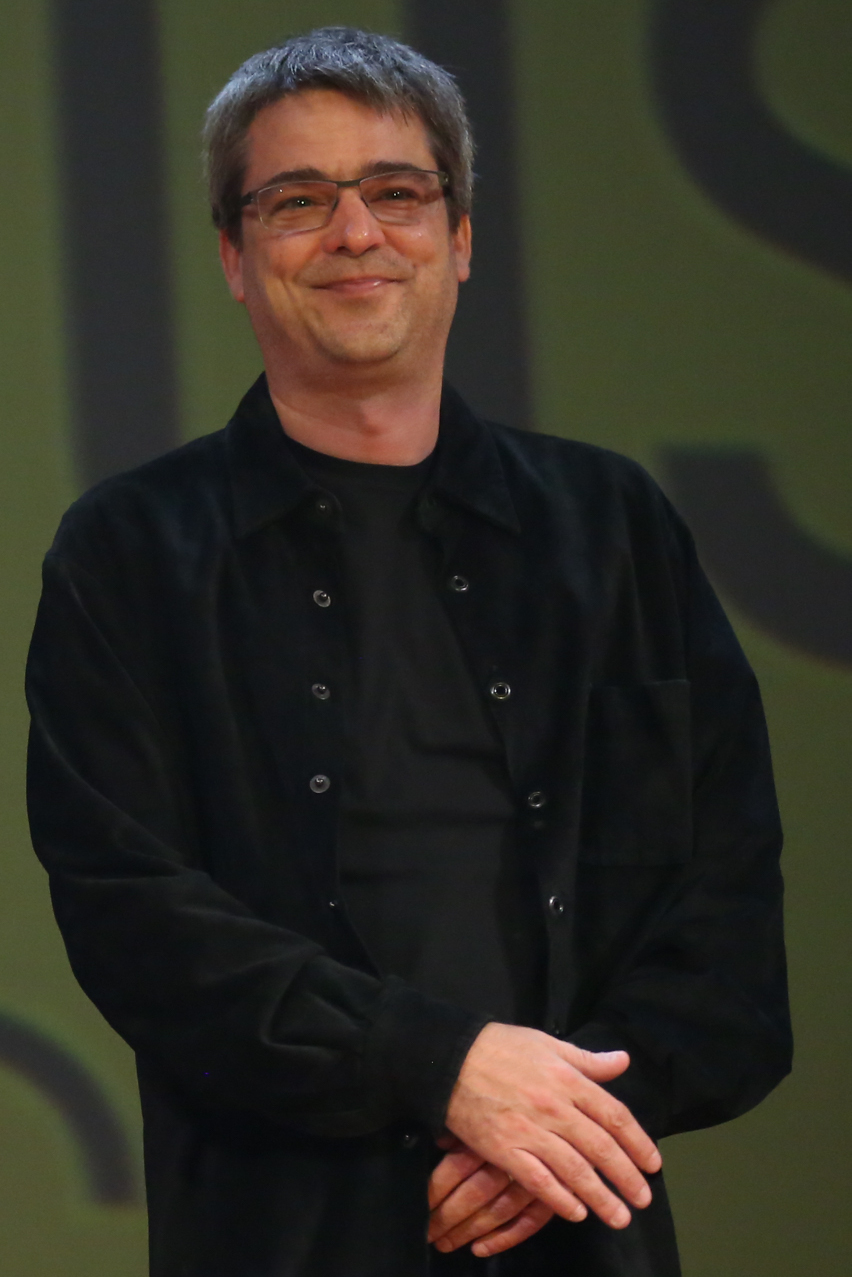
- Born: Andrew Waddington; 20 January 1970 (age 56); Rio de Janeiro, Brazil
- Occupations: Film director; film producer; screenwriter
- Years active: 1998–present
- Spouses: Kiti Duarte (divorced) Fernanda Torres (m. 1997)
- Children: 4
- Relatives: Fernanda Montenegro (mother-in-law); Fernando Torres (father-in-law); Cláudio Torres (brother-in-law)

Andrew "Andrucha" Waddington (born 20 January 1970) is a Brazilian film director, producer, and screenwriter.

== Career ==
His several film credits include Me You Them (2000), Mention spéciale of Un Certain Regard in Cannes, an Official Selection of Toronto and Sundance Film Festivals, Brazil's official entry to the Oscars - Best Foreign Language Film - and winner, Best Film, at Karlovy Vary, Havana and Cartagena Film festivals; The House of Sand (2005) Berlin, Toronto, and Sundance film festivals official selection, winner of the Sundance/NHK International Filmmakers Script and Alfred Sloan awards; and the Brazil/Spain co-production Lope (2010), a Venice and Toronto official selection and winner of two Goya Awards.

Moreover, he directed and produced the TV Globo/Conspiração drama series Under Pressure (2017–2019), which got rave reviews and skyrocket ratings. He also directed and produced the Brazilian blockbuster Party Crashers (2012), the biopic Chacrinha – O Velho Guerreiro (2018), the thriller The Loss (2019), the drama Vitória and theatrical film documentaries as Gilberto Gil – Viva São João (2002), Maria Bethania-Pedrinha de Aruanda (2007) and André Midani - from vinyl to download (2015).

Andrucha Waddington has been a partner at Conspiração Filmes since 1995.

He was one of the creative directors of the opening ceremony of the 2016 Olympics in Rio de Janeiro, working alongside Daniela Thomas and Fernando Meirelles on a shoestring budget equivalent to less than £5 million.

== Personal life ==
He is married to actress Fernanda Torres since 1997. The couple has two sons, Joaquim (b. 2000) and Antônio (b. 2008). He also has two sons, João (b. 1993) and Pedro (b. 1995), from his first marriage to art director Kiti Duarte. From his second marriage, he is the son-in-law of Brazilian writer and actress Fernanda Montenegro and the Brazilian actor Fernando Torres.

== Filmography ==
=== Film ===
- Paralamas em Close Up (1998)
- Gêmeas (1999)
- Eu Tu Eles (2000)
- Outros (Doces) Bárbaros (2000)
- Os Paralamas do Sucesso - Longo Caminho (2002)
- Gilberto Gil: Tempo Rei (2002)
- Viva São João! (2002)
- Casa de Areia (2005)
- 'Y Ikatu Xingu (2006)
- Maria Bethânia - Pedrinha de Aruanda (2007)
- Lope (2010)
- Os Penetras (2012)
- Rio, I Love You (segment "Dona Fulana") (2014)
- Sob Pressão (2016)
- Os Penetras 2 (2017)
- Chacrinha, o Velho Guerreiro (2018)
- The Loss (2019)
- Vitória (2025)

=== TV shows ===
- Sob Pressão (2017–2019)
- Rio 2016 Olympic Games Opening Ceremony (TV Special)
- André Midani: do Vinil ao Download (2015)
- Retrato Celular (2007)
