= Zazá =

- Genre: Telenovela
- Created by: Lauro César Muniz
- Written by: Aimar Labaki; Rosane Lima
- Directed by: Jorge Fernando
- Starring: Fernanda Montenegro
- Opening theme: "Dona Doida" by Rita Lee
- Country of origin: Brazil
- Original language: Portuguese
- No. of episodes: 215

Production
- Running time: 50 minutes

Original release
- Network: TV Globo
- Release: 5 May 1997 – 9 January 1998

Zazá is a Brazilian telenovela created by Lauro César Muniz, and starring Fernanda Montenegro. It was broadcast on TV Globo from May 5, 1997 to January 9, 1998.

== Plot ==
Zazá Dumont (Fernanda Montenegro) is an eccentric millionaire who has a passion for airplanes. She grew up hearing from her mother that she was the daughter of inventor Alberto Santos-Dumont, a relationship confirmed by his old friend and confidant, Brigadier Pascoal Borato. Zazá's mother had met the young Alberto at a carnival seventy years earlier. Despite this, historical records about the father of aviation do not mention that he had any children.

The plot opens with Zazá wearing a moustache and dressed as Santos Dumont, in Paris retaking his pioneering flight in a replica of the 14-bis, after circling the Eiffel Tower. Drawing attention to the secret project she has in hand: the construction of an innovative atomic plane.

Zazá is also an overprotective mother, she has seven children. All of them are either not good at anything or don't know how to do anything, which Ângelo, her second husband, criticizes. To prove him wrong, Zazá vows to make her children competent and independent. On one of her flights, Zazá sees the clouds form the figure of seven angels and has an idea: hire seven professionals linked to the areas in which her children are interested to be what she calls guardian angels and guide the seven children in business.

The seven "guardian angels" are highly skilled professionals, but with some difficulties and mistakes made in the past, which is reflected in the scheme organized by Silas, the Dumont family's lawyer, who gathers evidence against the angels and keeps them all "on their toes". Silas' intention is to make the angels "seven shadows", in other words, to convince them to work without their names being made public, which means that it is Zazá's children who will take all the glory, giving the appearance that they are intelligent and successful on top of the angels' talent. Silas' main aim is to prevent Zazá's project from getting off the ground and to take over the companies for himself.

== Cast ==
- Fernanda Montenegro as Mariza Dumont "Zazá"
- Ney Latorraca as Silas Vasconcelos "Silas Vadan"
- Nathalia Timberg as Teresa Vasconcelos
- Paulo Goulart as Ulisses
- Cecil Thiré as Dorival Dumont "Doc"
- Fafy Siqueira as Renata Dumont
- Antônio Calloni as Milton Dumont
- Julia Lemmertz as Fabiana Dumont
- Alexandre Borges as Solano Dumont
- Vanessa Lóes as Lavínia Dumont
- Rachel Ripani as Sílvia Dumont "Sissi"
- Fernando Torres as Brigadeiro
- Letícia Spiller as Beatriz Soffer
- Marcello Novaes as Hugo Guerreiro
- Jorge Dória as Angelo Dumont
- Reginaldo Faria as Roberto
- Louise Cardoso as Mercedes Hidalgo
- Cláudia Ohana as Maria Olímpia
- Mário Gomes as Álvaro
- Xuxa Lopes as Marina
- Paulo Gorgulho as Victor
- Roberto Bataglin as Pedro
- Giselle Policarpo as Clarinha Dumont
- Deborah Secco as Dora Meira Dumont
- Fernanda Rodrigues as Valéria
- Juliana Martins as Lúcia
- Marcos Breda as Ronaldo Hidalgo "Ro-Ro Pedalada"
- André Valli as Marcos
- Sylvia Bandeira as Dorothy Meira Dumont
- Roberto Bontempo as José
- Betty Erthal as Jéssica
- Luciano Vianna as Samuel
- Ana Maria Nascimento e Silva as Hilda
- Eduardo Caldas as Jonas
- Aracy Cardoso as Neusa
- Élcio Romar as Lua
- Leina Krespi as Nilda
- Fernanda Muniz as Marília
- Marcelo Barros as Júnior
- Bernadeth Lyzio as Tânia
- Daniel Marinho as Luís
- David Cardoso Jr. as Douglas
- Adriana Londoño as Jacqueline Dumont
- Sueli Oliveira as Isabel

== Production ==
Zazá is presented in the form of a farce, using caricatured and eccentric characters, in addition to showing situations that border on fantasy and the unreal. The plot changed tone from farcical comedy to drama.

Originally, Zazá was to run for 161 episodes, but since Corpo Dourado was chosen late as its replacement, there was no time for its premiere that year. For this reason, Lauro César Muniz had to add 54 episodes. The telenovela struggled with viewership. Muñiz stated that he had never written such a long telenovela and after growing tired of the workload, he split the responsibility with two other collaborators: Jacqueline Veleso and Felipe Miguez.

Globo's set design team, in partnership with Embraer, produced a replica of a real airplane for the plot, a hybrid model inspired by the Brasília and a futuristic aircraft designed by Santos Dumont. The airplane was used by the writer as a metaphor for the country's development. According to Muniz, the main purpose of the telenovela was to discuss whether or not Brazil was "taking off" towards the future.

The character Zazá was born in 1924, five years older than the actress Fernanda Montenegro. The production team thought of putting a gray wig on the actress to make her look older, but gave up the idea and let her assume her own identity. In Montenegro's opinion, love in old age is one of the most interesting aspects of the telenovela. The older actors star in love affairs, adulteries and fights, which is "very beautiful", said the actress.

The telenovela also tackled the themes of AIDS and sexuality. The character Jacqueline, played by debuting Adriana Londoño, was infected with HIV during a blood transfusion. The show featured a bisexual character (Rô Rô Pedalada) and a pansexual character (Silas), representing sexual minorities in society who had previously been little explored in telenovelas.
