= Guaçuí =

- Municipality
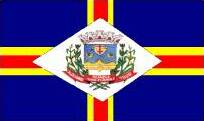
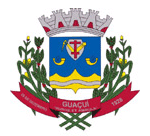
- Flag Coat of arms

- Location in Espírito Santo state

- Location in Brazil
- Coordinates: 20°46′33″S 41°40′44″W
- Country: Brazil
- Region: Southeast
- State: Espírito Santo

Area
  - Total: 469 km^{2} (181 sq mi)

Population (2020)
  - Total: 31,122
  - Density: 66.4/km^{2} (172/sq mi)
- Time zone: UTC−3 (BRT)

Guaçuí is a municipality located in the Brazilian state of Espírito Santo. Its population was 31,122 (2020) and its area is 469 km^{2}.

The city's economy is based mainly on coffee production and livestock farming.
