= Fernanda Montenegro =

Brazilian actress (born 1929)

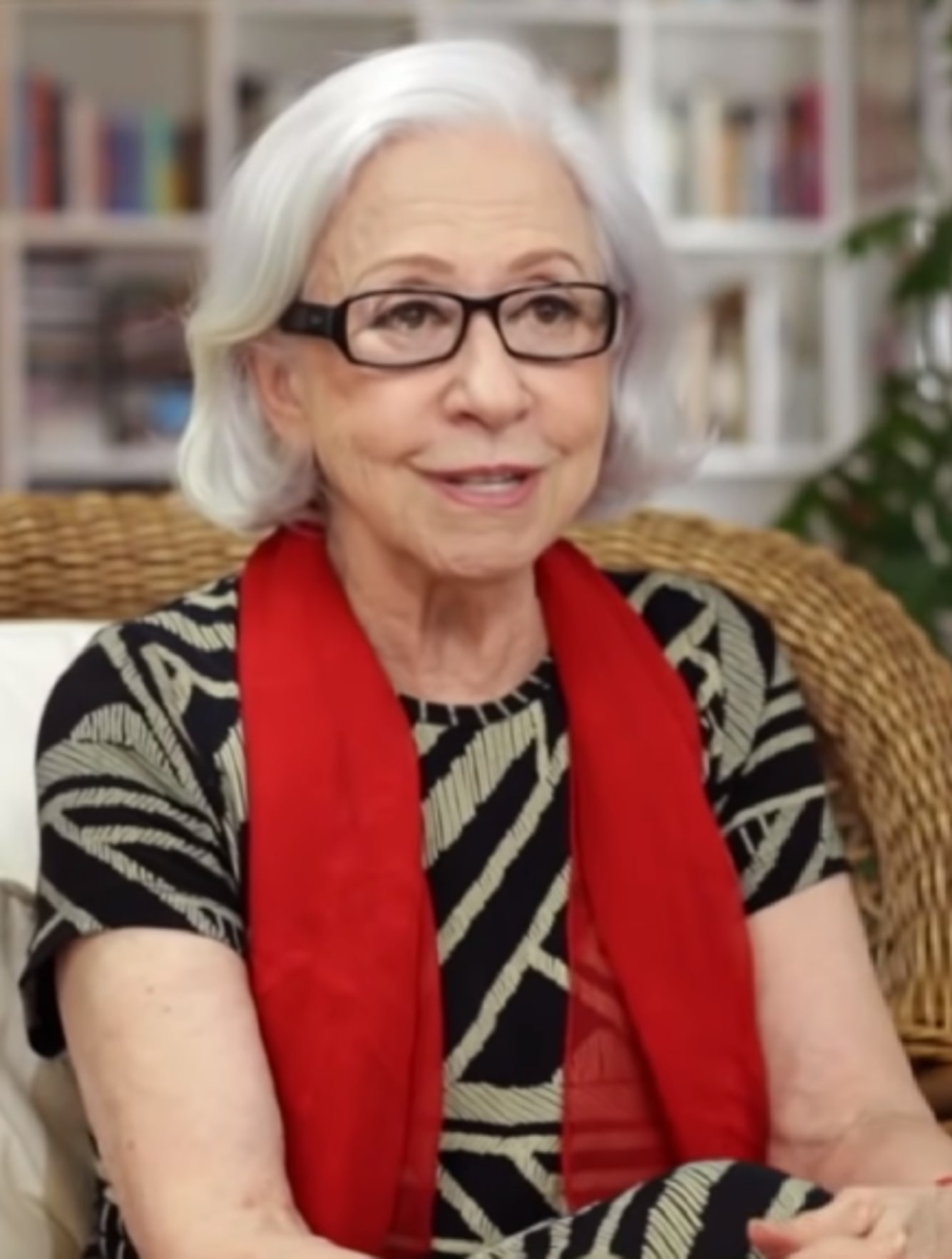
- Montenegro in 2019
- Born: Arlette Pinheiro Esteves da Silva; 16 October 1929 (age 96); Campinho, Rio de Janeiro, Brazil
- Education: Pedro II School
- Alma mater: Berlitz Corporation
- Occupation: Actress
- Years active: 1950–active
- Spouse: Fernando Torres (m. 1953; died 2008)
- Children: Cláudio Torres; Fernanda Torres
- Relatives: Andrucha Waddington (son-in-law)
- Website: Official website

Arlette Pinheiro Monteiro Torres (née Esteves da Silva; born 16 October 1929), known by her stage name Fernanda Montenegro (Brazilian Portuguese: [feʁˈnɐ̃dɐ mõtʃiˈneɡɾu]), is a Brazilian actress. Considered by many as the greatest Brazilian actress of all time, she is often referred to as the grande dame of Brazilian theater, cinema, and performing arts. For her work in Central Station (1998), she became the first Brazilian and first Latin American to be nominated for the Academy Award for Best Actress, as well as the first actress nominated for an Academy Award for a performance in a Portuguese language film. Her daughter, actress Fernanda Torres, was also nominated in 2025. Additionally, she became the first Brazilian to win the Emmy Award for Best Actress, for her performance in Sweet Mother (2014).

Among the various national and international awards she has received in a career spanning more than sixty years, she was awarded in 1999 her country's highest civilian honor, the National Order of Merit, "in recognition of her outstanding work in the Brazilian performing arts," delivered by then-president Fernando Henrique Cardoso. In addition to having been awarded the Molière Prize five times, Fernanda Montenegro is a three-time recipient of the Governor Award of the State of São Paulo. She also won the Silver Bear for Best Actress at the 48th Berlin International Film Festival 1998 for her performance as "Dora" in Central Station by Walter Salles, a role which earned her nominations for the Academy Award for Best Actress and the Golden Globe Award for Best Actress in a Motion Picture – Drama in 1999, among other distinctions. On television, she was the first actress hired by TV Tupi, in 1951, where she starred in teletheater shows under the direction of Fernando Torres, Sérgio Britto, Ítalo Rossi, and Flávio Rangel. She made her debut in telenovelas in 1954 with A Muralha on RecordTV, where she appeared in other productions as well. She has done work in most of Brazil's main broadcasters, such as Band, TV Cultura, RecordTV, and TV Globo (where she remains since 1981), in addition to the defunct TV Excelsior, TV Rio and TV Tupi.

In 2014, she was voted the 15th most influential celebrity in Brazil by Forbes magazine. During the Opening Ceremony of the 2016 Summer Olympics, Fernanda read the poem "A Flor e a Náusea" by Carlos Drummond de Andrade, dubbed in English by Judi Dench.

On 4 November 2021, she was elected to occupy the Chair number 17 at the Brazilian Academy of Letters, in succession to Affonso Arinos de Mello Franco.

In November 2024, she was recognized by Guinness World Records for achieving the biggest audience in a Philosophy lecture, with over 15,000 people attending an event on 18 August 2024 at the Ibirapuera Park, where Montenegro read La Cérémonie des Adieux by Simone de Beauvoir. In December 2025, she confirmed her retirement from her career in film.

== Early life ==
Fernanda Montenegro was born as Arlette Pinheiro Esteves da Silva, the daughter of Vitório Esteves da Silva, a mechanic of Portuguese origin, and Carmen Nieddu Pinheiro Esteves da Silva, a housewife, daughter of Italians from the island of Sardinia.

== Career ==
=== Stage and television career ===
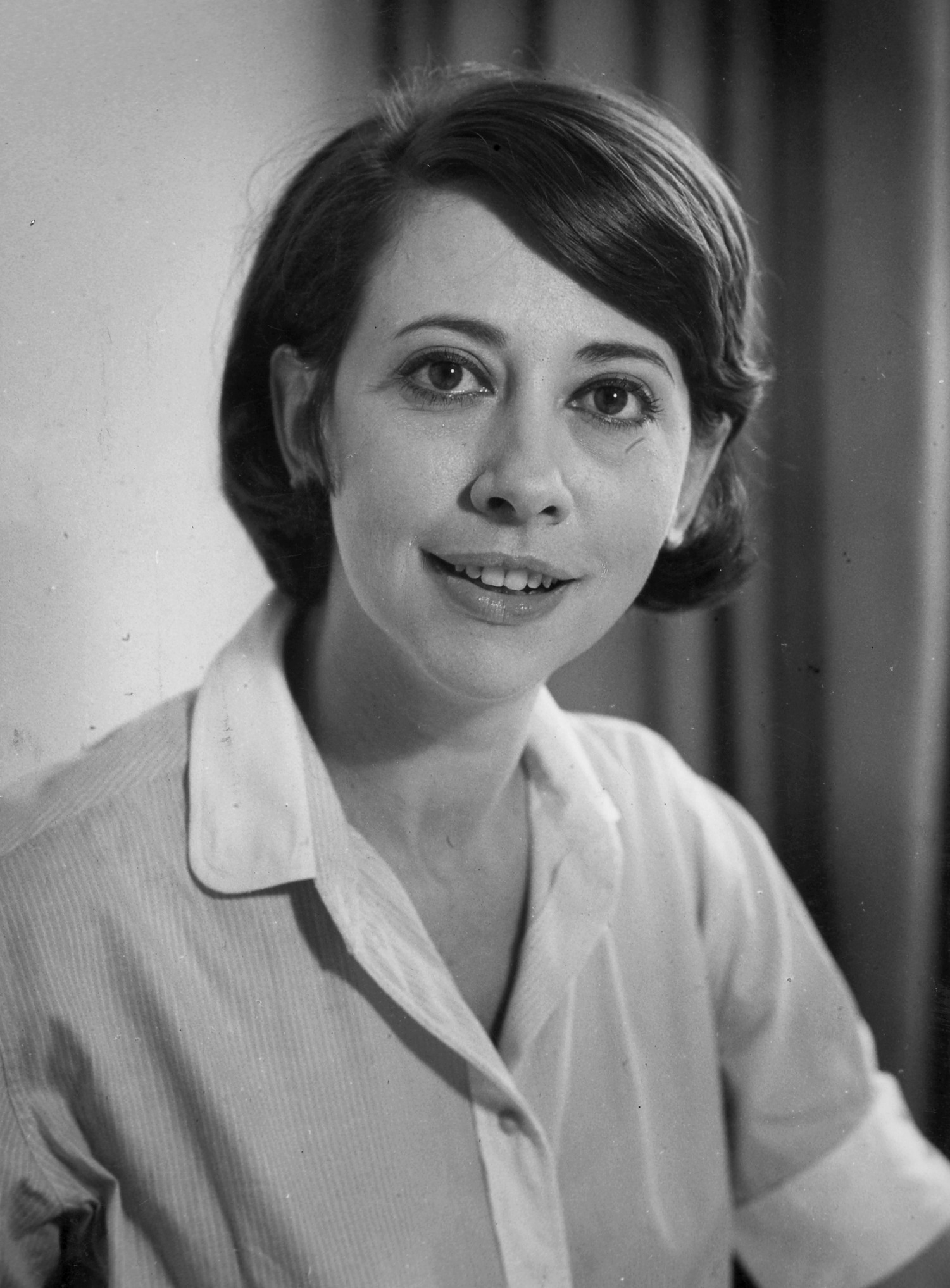
Fernanda Montenegro, 1967. National Archives of Brazil.

In the late 1940s, Montenegro was adapting famous theatre plays to radio. She began her artistic life in the theatre with the play Alegres Canções nas Montanhas (Happy Songs on the Mountain) in 1950. Among her fellow actors was Fernando Torres, who would soon become her husband. She subsequently worked with other acclaimed actors like Sérgio Britto, Cacilda Becker, Nathalia Timberg, Cláudio Corrêa e Castro and Ítalo Rossi. In 1951 she became a TV pioneer in Brazil, working for Rio de Janeiro's TV Tupi – the second TV station of South America. She appeared in several plays on TV between 1951 and 1970.

Moving to São Paulo in the early 1960s, Montenegro initially worked solely on theatre. In 1963 she took her first role in a telenovela Pouco Amor Não é Amor. A succession of notable telenovela's roles followed, mainly her performances in the ensemble piece A Muralha (1968), based on the novel by celebrated Brazilian author Dinah Silveira de Queiroz, and Sangue do Meu Sangue (1969), a memorable melodrama engraved in Brazilian pop culture, whose stellar cast featured not only Montenegro, but other theatre's stars like Sérgio Britto, Cláudio Corrêa e Castro, Francisco Cuoco, Nicette Bruno and Tônia Carrero.

Throughout the 1970s Montenegro moved away from television, rather focusing on her theatre and film career. Still, a televised performance in Euripides’ classic play Medea, in 1973, was lauded by reviewers. It was only in the very late 1970s that Montenegro would once again engage in a substantial television effort, with Cara a Cara (1979), for which she won the Best Actress in Television Award by the São Paulo Art Critics Association.

The 1980s marked Montenegro's return to television in full force. She appeared in telenovelas such as Baila Comigo (1981), Brilhante (1982) and Cambalacho (1986), and struck a massive hit with Guerra dos Sexos (1983), a light-hearted comedy about the constant bickering men and women experience in different stages of romantic relationships. In the latter, Montenegro once again left a significant impression in Brazilian pop culture, starring in a now-immortalized food fight scene, opposite Paulo Autran. Throughout this decade, Montenegro won her second and third Best Actress in Television Awards, by the São Paulo Art Critics Association, for her work in Brilhante and Guerra dos Sexos.

The early 1990s proved once again to be a time of success in television for Montenegro, as she took on roles in two other smash hits, the popular primetime telenovelas Rainha da Sucata (1990) and O Dono do Mundo (1991), both Brazilian pop culture favorites. Years later, she once again gained artistic distinction, appearing on the critically acclaimed mini-series Incidente em Antares (1994), an adaptation of the book by one of Brazilian literature's greatest novelists, Erico Verissimo.

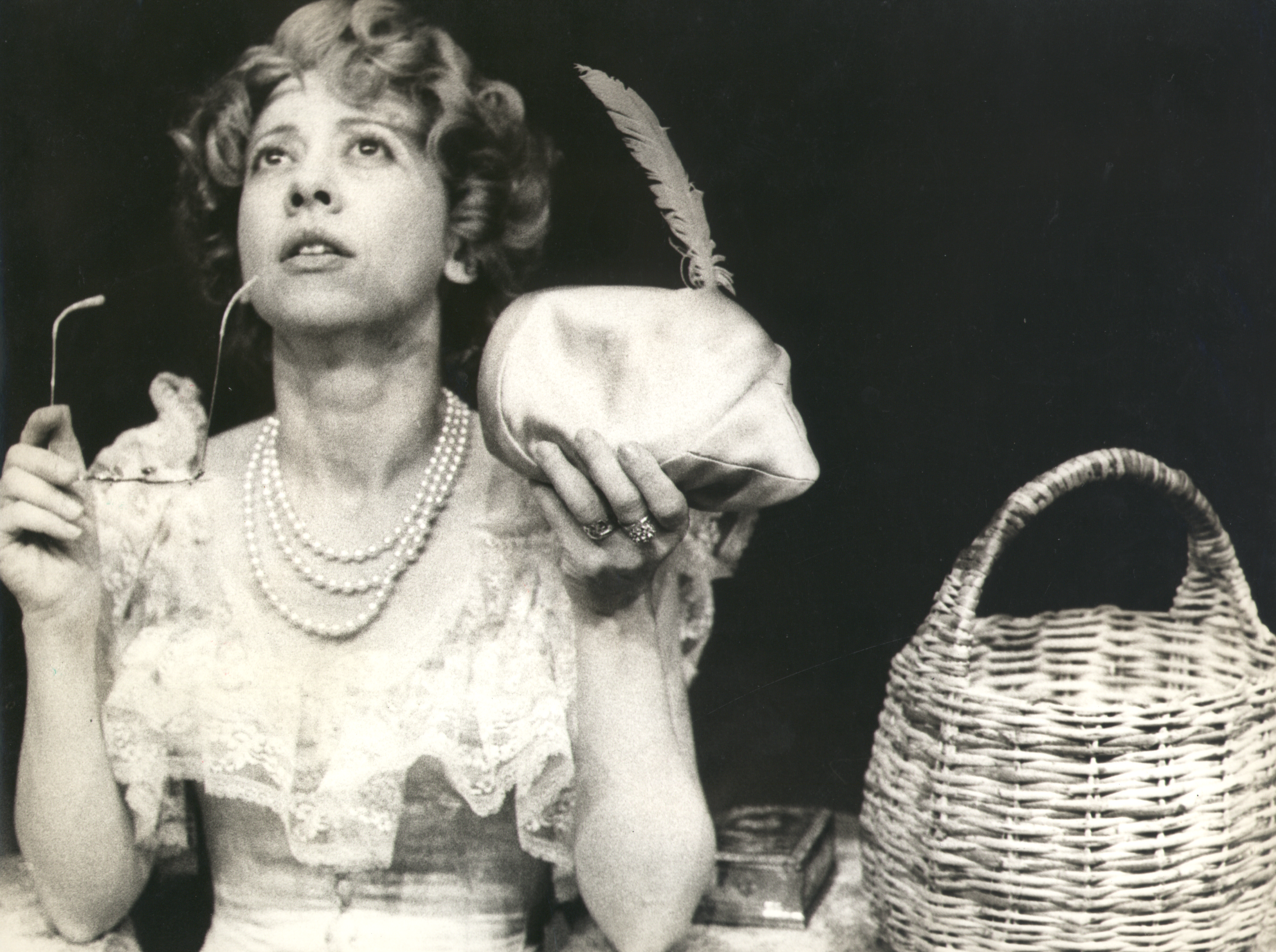
Fernanda Montenegro in the theater, 1970. National Archives of Brazil.

In 1997, Montenegro's string of critical and audience triumphs came to an abrupt halt as her portrayal of the lead role in the telenovela Zazá, a much anticipated return to comedy, couldn't live up to either reviewers' or the viewing public's expectations. After a series of changes in attempt to salvage it from absolute failure, still facing overall rejection, the show was cut short and quickly wrapped. Despite its being a considerable letdown, "Zazá" was soon eclipsed by the monumental success Montenegro's film career witnessed with the release of Central Station.

In spite of a successful minor appearance as Mary, mother of Jesus, in the mini-series O Auto da Compadecida (1999), later re-cut into a theatrical film (internationally known as A Dog's Will), Montenegro's television career struggled in the late 1990s and early 2000s. In 2001, another attempt was made in telenovela comedy with As Filhas da Mãe, which covered the backstage of Brazilian Fashion Industry. Short of a celebrated scene, early on, which featured Montenegro's character winning an Oscar, the telenovela was, once more, a flop. Lackluster ratings and overall negative reviews led to its swift cancellation. Nevertheless, Montenegro still managed to be nominated as Best Actress in the Contigo Awards, which laureates excellence in Brazilian telenovelas.

The following year, Montenegro shifted towards primetime drama, opting for a minor role in the first stage of the telenovela Esperança (2002). Although Montenegro herself earned positive reviews, "Esperança" was a major failure, generally panned by critics and despised by audiences, setting a record for an all-time low in ratings for a primetime telenovela televised by TV Globo, the broadcasting channel of Brazil's most powerful telecommunications conglomerate. Due to Montenegro's continued success in film, as well as her status as one of the most cherished artists and personalities in Brazil, these disappointments tended to be minimized, often regarded as minor blots in an extended résumé of significant successes.

Montenegro returned to television's good graces in a supporting role as the exploitive stepmother of the lead character in the ensemble piece mini-series Hoje É Dia de Maria (2005), a coming-of-age tale set in a fantasy world, positively reviewed for its inventiveness, its stunning art direction and overall production design, as well as its acting. Montenegro scored her second nomination as Best Actress in the Contigo Awards, while the mini-series garnered two nominations for the International Emmy Awards and won the Grand Prize of the Critics of the São Paulo Art Critics Association Award.

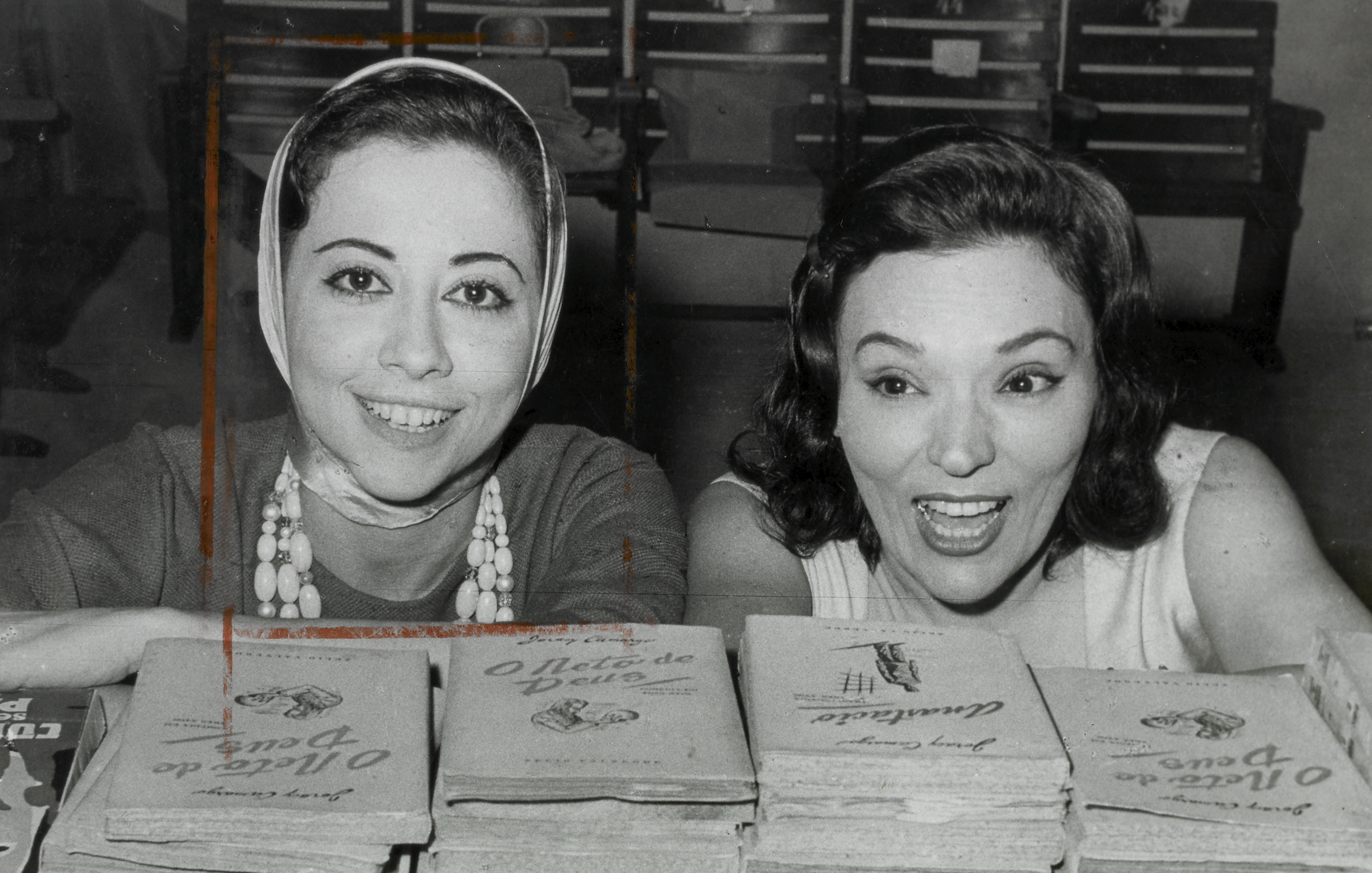
Fernanda Montenegro and Bibi Ferreira, 1972. National Archives of Brazil.

The following year, Montenegro returned to primetime drama, taking on the female lead role in Belíssima (2006), which also offered a backstage view to Brazilian Fashion Industry, only in a much more earnest and cruel perspective than in her previous work As Filhas da Mãe (2001). Starring as the shrewd calculating villainess, Bia Falcão, Montenegro was applauded by critics and audiences alike, delivering a solid, sophisticated performance while handling an unapologetic, uncharismatic character, whose story twist was pivotal to the development of the main plot. For this portrayal, Montenegro finally won her first Contigo Award for Best Actress, and also her fourth Best Actress in Television Award by the São Paulo Art Critics Association.

Following her streak of well-received roles, Montenegro returned to television in 2008, taking a supporting role, as Dona Iraci, in the critically and publicly acclaimed primetime mini-Series Queridos Amigos, based on the book "Aos Amigos", by Portuguese novelist Maria Adelaide Amaral, an ensemble piece that tells a fictional reconstitution of personal experiences of Amaral and a group of close friends, set during a moment of political turbulence in the Brazilian transition from a military dictatorship to a democratic regime.

In 2010, she starred in the telenovela Passione, where she played Beth Gouveia.

In 2012, Montenegro starred in the latest episode of the miniseries As Brasileiras as an actress without much talent named Mary Torres. Determined to make the success they have always dreamed, Mary ends vontando television to revive his career.

In Sweet Mother, she plays Dona Picucha, an 85-year-old widow who confronts life with good humor and who knows how to take advantage of all the difficulties she face. “‘Sweet Mother’ has one foot in reality and the other in fantasy. The reality of a country of youths where there are more and more old people and many doubts about how to deal with them. The fantasy of the comedy, the music, the poetry which become a believable reality. Picucha is 85 years old and still does not know what she wants to be when she grows up. I don't either,” Fernanda said. Montenegro was awarded for her role, and became the first Brazilian actress to win an Emmy Award. She would return to play the same character, now in the TV series of the same name, which was aired in 2014 by Globo. She was again nominated for an Emmy in 2015, and the series was awarded Best Comedy at the 43rd International Emmy Awards Gala.

In 2013, at age 85 years, Montenegro returns to television in the remake of Saramandaia.

In the same year, Montenegro had participated in the cast of the telenovela Babilônia, written by Gilberto Braga, in the role of Teresa, a lesbian lawyer who maintains a relationship with the character Nathalia Timberg, Estela.

=== Film career ===
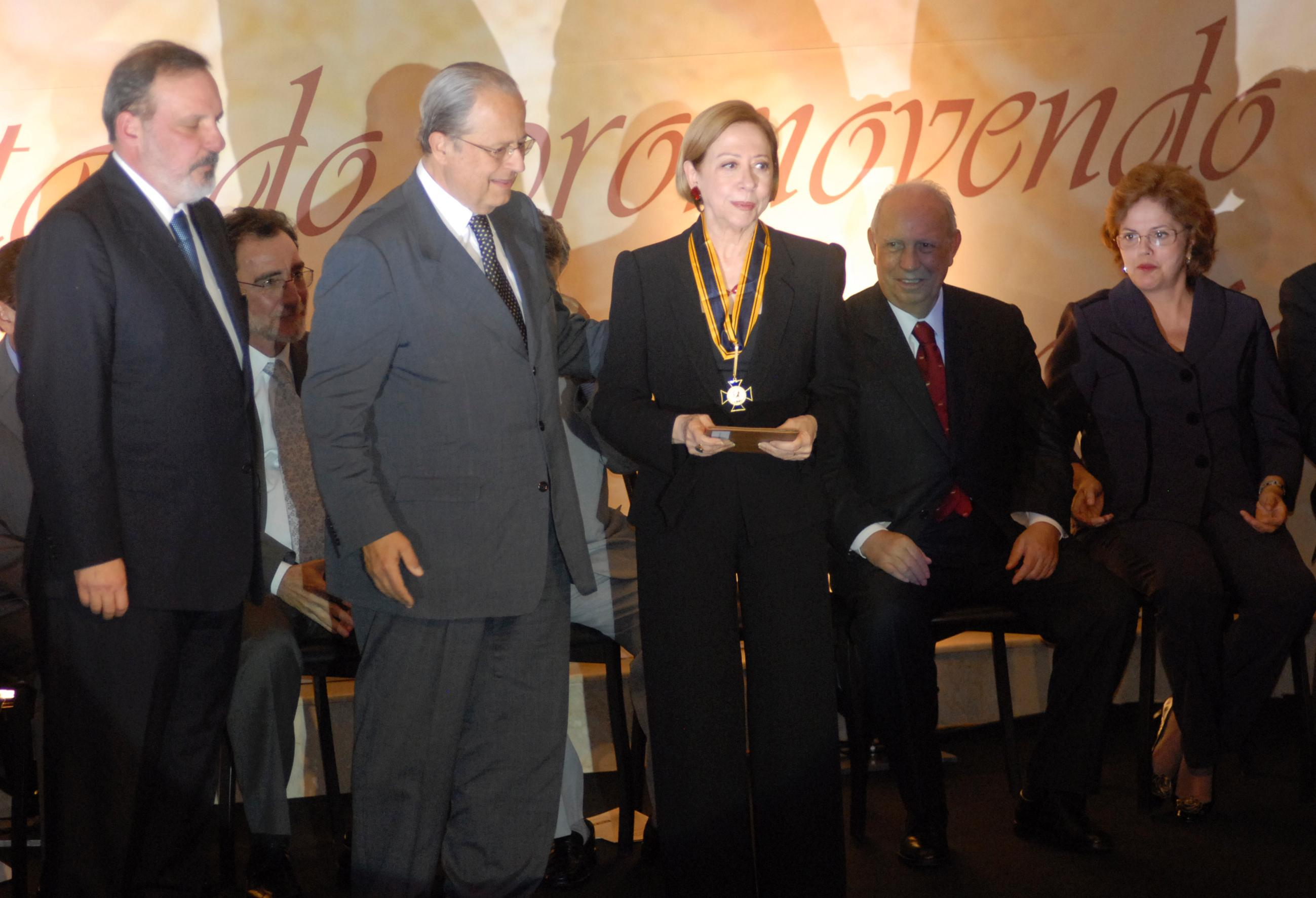
The actress Fernanda Montenegro is awarded with the medal Euvaldo Lodi, celebrating the 70th anniversary of the Confederação Nacional da Indústria (CNI).

Montenegro's film career was launched in the mid-1960s. Her debut came in 1965, as Zulmira, in the movie A Falecida (internationally known as The Death and released in the U.S. as The Deceased). The film was a cinematic adaptation of the play, by the greatest of Brazilian dramatists, Nelson Rodrigues, and earned its female lead, amongst positive reviews, her first distinction as a film actress, as Montenegro won the Candango Trophy as Best Actress in the Brasília Festival of Brazilian Cinema.

Throughout the 1970s, Montenegro was featured in a series of other movies, but none seemed to match the degree of acclaim as her debut, until, in 1978, she starred as Elvira Barata, opposite Paulo Gracindo, in Arnaldo Jabor's Tudo Bem (internationally known as Everything's Alright). The movie earned positive reviews, eventually winning the top prize at the Brasília Festival of Brazilian Cinema, taking the Candango Trophy for Best Film. Although receiving considerable appraisal, Montenegro's performance missed any major awards.

As her next big screen role, in 1981, Montenegro starred as Romana in Eles Não Usam Black-Tie (internationally known as They Don't Wear Black Tie), based on a play by the late Gianfrancesco Guarnieri, who was also her co-star in the movie. The movie proved to be a big domestic hit, earning Guarnieri the Award as Best Actor in Film by the São Paulo Art Critics Association, and, most significantly, a movie of international notice, landing major awards in film festivals all around the world, including the Grand Coral First Prize in the Havana Film Festival, as well as the Grand Jury Special Prize and the FIPRESCI Prize in the Venice Film Festival.

Focusing in television during the 1980s, Montenegro's film exposure was limited throughout the remaining of the decade, but she still participated in a minor role as Carlota, a religious practitioner of Umbanda (a syncretic belief system very popular in Brazil), in 1985's A Hora da Estrela (internationally known as Hour of the Star), a movie that was lauded by critics both domestically – snatching six Candango Trophies in the Brasília Festival of Brazilian Cinema, including Best Film, Director, Actor (José Dumont) and Actress (Marcélia Cartaxo) and, internationally, earning the Grand Coral First Prize in the Havana Film Festival, as well as three major awards in the Berlin Film Festival: the International Confederation of Art House Cinemas Award, the OCIC Award and the Silver Berlin Bear for Best Actress (awarded to fellow co-star Marcélia Cartaxo).

Montenegro's film career hiatus would only be broken in 1994, emerging in a segment titled "Samba do Grande Amor" of the film Veja Esta Canção (internationally known as Rio's Love Song), which garnered its director Carlos Diegues a Best Director Award in the Havana Film Festival. She then moved, in 1997, to a small appearance in O Que é Isso, Companheiro? (internationally known as Four Days in September), which starred American actor Alan Arkin and chronicled the kidnapping of American consul Charles Burke Elbrick by rebellious political activists who opposed the military dictatorship in Brazil, based on the memoirs of Brazilian politician Fernando Gabeira. The movie had significant international repercussion, welcoming nominations to the Golden Bear in the Berlin International Film Festival and to the Academy Award for Best Foreign Language Film.

=== Central do Brasil ===
In 1998, Montenegro starred in Central do Brasil (internationally known as Central Station), as Dora, her most internationally famous and prestigious role. The movie fared well domestically, winning four awards by the São Paulo Art Critics Association (including Best Film, Director and Actress in Film – Montenegro's first, after winning thrice for her television career), and achieved international acclaim unprecedented for any Brazilian film. Central Station debuted to undisputed praise in the Berlin Film Festival, eventually earning three of its major awards: The Golden Berlin Bear for Best Film, the Special Prize by the Ecumenical Jury and the Silver Berlin Bear for Best Actress for Montenegro.

Successively, many other honors were bestowed upon the film, as it won five awards at the Havana Film Festival, including the Special Jury Prize and the Best Actress Award to Montenegro, as well as several other prizes for Best Foreign Film, including a BAFTA, a Golden Globe, awards by the Argentine Film Critics Association, the National Board of Review, the San Sebastián International Film Festival, the Spain Film Critics Association, the Spain Cinema Writers Circle and the Satellite Awards, among others. Other high-profile Best Foreign Film nominations included the César Award, the Independent Spirit Award, and an Academy Award nomination as Best Film in a Foreign Language.

Montenegro was honored on numerous occasions, earning additional Best Actress awards from the Fort Lauderdale International Film Festival, the National Board of Review and the Los Angeles Film Critics Association, and others. She was also nominated for a Golden Satellite Award, for a Golden Globe and for the Academy Award for Best Actress in a Leading Role, a feat which gave Montenegro the distinction of being the first (Brazilian and) Latin American actress to be bestowed with such an honor by the Academy. She is also the first person nominated for a performance in the Portuguese language. In 2025, her own daughter, Fernanda Torres, accomplished that feat being the second Brazilian person to be nominated for Best Actress at the Academy Awards for the movie I'm Still Here (2024) (also directed by Central Station director, Walter Salles).

=== 21st century ===
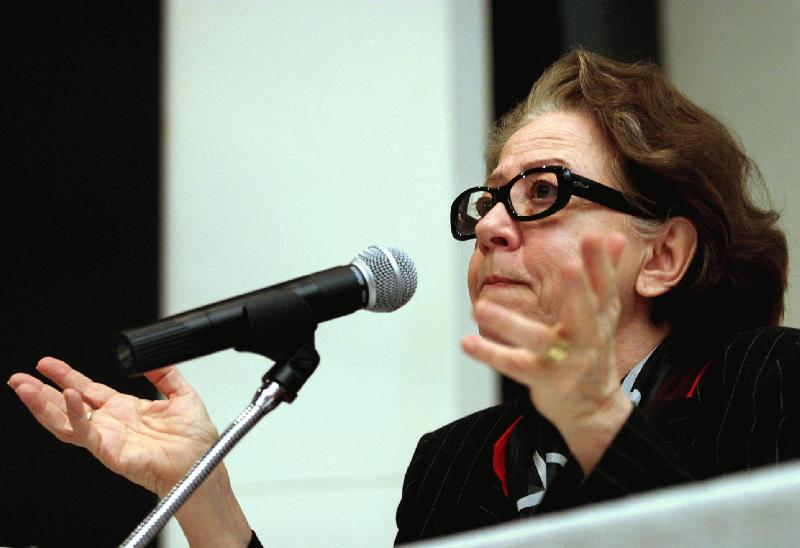
Montenegro in 2003

Montenegro's follow-up to Central Station marked her return to the work of Nélson Rodrigues, as she took on a supporting role in 1999's "Gêmeas", directed by her own son-in-law, Andrucha Waddington, and starred by her own daughter, Fernanda Torres. The film fared relatively well domestically, earning Torres a Candango Trophy for Best Actress in the Brasília Festival of Brazilian Cinema and a nomination for Best Actress in the Cinema Brazil Grand Prize, but failed to gain any substantial recognition internationally. In 2000, the celebrated television mini-series "O Auto da Compadecida", in which Montenegro appeared as the Holy Mary, was re-cut into a film of same title (internationally known as A Dog's Will) and released to movie theaters to significantly appreciative domestic appraisal. It eventually won four awards at the Cinema Brazil Grand Prize, including Best Director, Best Actor (Matheus Nachtergaele) and Best Screenplay (surprisingly, it lost the Best Picture award), but also failed to launch a noteworthy international career.

In 2004, Montenegro's film career was once again in full force. She returned to the Berlin Film Festival with O Outro Lado da Rua (internationally known as The Other Side of the Street), which landed stellar reviews and garnered the International Confederation of Art House Cinemas Award. Montenegro herself was also honored, winning the Horizons Award in the San Sebastian International Film Festival and the Best Actress Award in the Tribeca Film Festival. Domestically, the film also fared well, landing six nominations to the Cinema Brazil Grand Prize, with Montenegro winning the Best Actress award.

The same year, she also took a supporting role in Redentor (internationally known as Redeemer), directed by her son, Cláudio Torres, and co-starred by her husband Fernando Torres. The movie proved to be a smash hit domestically, earning rave reviews and scoring nine nominations in the Cinema Brazil Grand Prize (winning one for Best Director), but failed to produce an expressive splash internationally. Still in 2004, Montenegro once again landed a supporting role, playing Leocádia Prestes, mother of Brazilian communist leader Luiz Carlos Prestes, and mother-in-law of Jewish-German socialist revolutionary Olga Benário in the biopic Olga, based on the book by Brazilian biographer Fernando Morais. The movie was received with mixed reviews by critics, often praised for its technical merits (mainly its cinematography, make-up art, costume design and art direction) and panned for its narrative and directing choices. It still fared strongly in the box-office, though, and scored nine nominations in the Cinema Brazil Grand Prize, earning three technical awards (Best Art Direction, Best Costume Design and Best Make-Up). "Olga" was also chosen, eventually, as the film to represent Brazil in the Oscar race in pursuit of a nomination for Best Foreign Language Film, but it did not make it to the final five nominees.

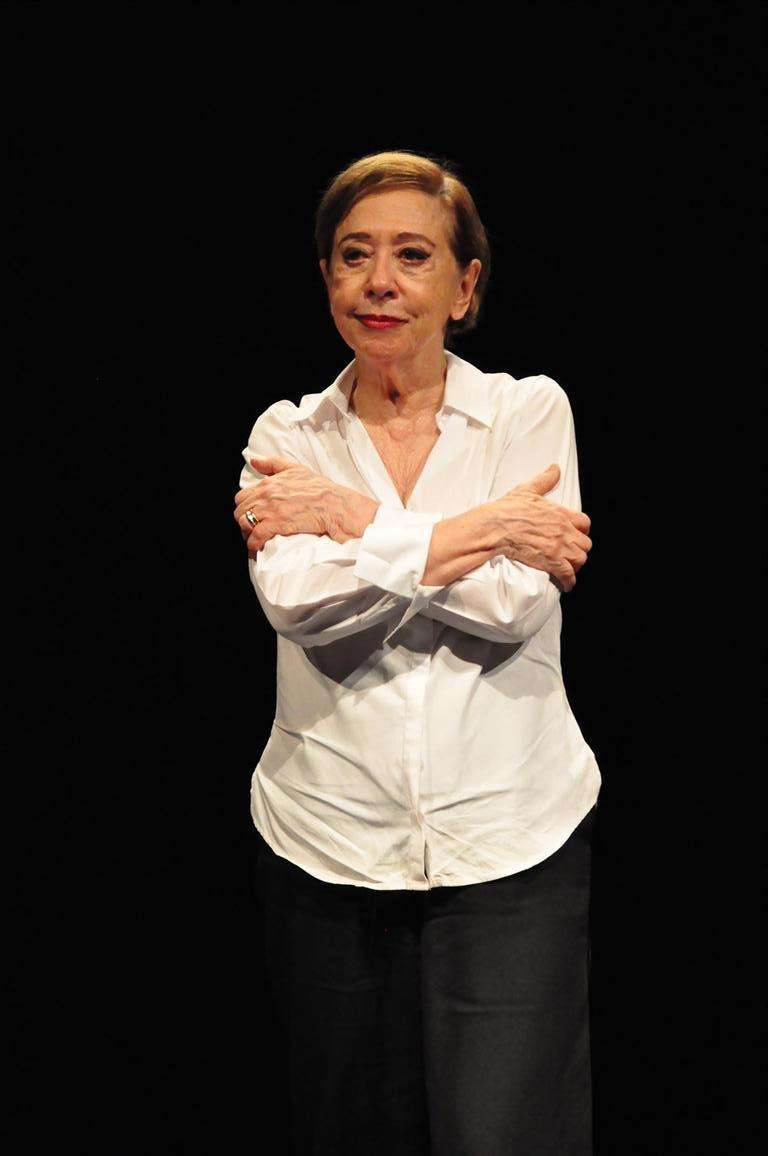
Fernanda Montenegro during presentation of the play Viver sem tempos mortos in 2012.

2005 saw Montenegro's return to lead, as she took on three different roles in the feminist epic saga Casa de Areia (internationally known as The House of Sand), opposite her own daughter, Fernanda Torres, with whom she alternated the same roles. The movie had a strong display domestically, earning rave reviews and special distinction to Montenegro's performance. It garnered 12 nominations to the Cinema Brazil Grand Prize (including Best Actress for Montenegro), earning three technical awards (the same as "Olga"). The movie displayed the potential to develop an international career, as it earned two nominations to the Satellite Awards and earned an Alfred P. Sloan Feature Film Prize in the Sundance Film Festival, but its campaign was crippled when Brazilian critics turned their support to Cinema, Aspirinas e Urubus (internationally known as Cinema, Aspirins and Vultures), choosing it to represent Brazil in the Oscar race.

In late 2006, Montenegro garnered attention for leading a movement of film artists and investors who firmly opposed a Congressional Bill that reduced federal incentives in cultural programmes, reallocating such funds to public investments in the fields of sports and leisure. On December 14, 2006, Montenegro directly addressed the Brazilian Senate, strongly criticizing the legislation and famously asserting "Culture is, above all, a social need. It is not a frivolity." For such deeds, as well as her overall career in film, Montenegro earned, in 2007, in the Rio de Janeiro International Film Festival, an Honorary Award, as a Latin American Character of the Culture. Also in 2007, Montenegro played Tránsito Ariza, in Love in the Time of Cholera, an adaptation of the novel by the winner of the Nobel Prize of Literature, Gabriel García Marquez. Albeit a minor role, it marked Montenegro's first performance in an English language spoken feature.

In 2012, Montenegro starred in the short film A Dama do Estácio directed by Edward Ades and in 2013 participated in the film cast Time and the Wind an adaptation of the novel by Erico Verissimo with Thiago Lacerda, Marjorie Estiano and Cléo Pires.

In 2024, at 95 years old, Montenegro entered the Guinness World Record for the largest audience during a philosophical reading for her stage reading of French writer and feminist activist Simone de Beauvoir's autobiography La Cérémonie des adieux (Adieux: A Farewell to Sartre, 1981) at Ibirapuera Park drawing an audience of 15,000 people.

Also in 2024, Montenegro and her daughter Fernanda Torres portrayed Eunice Paiva at different stages of her life in the acclaimed film I'm Still Here, directed by Walter Salles, who also directed Montenegro in Central Station. In 2025, this movie won the Academy award for Best International Feature Film, becoming the first-ever Brazilian produced film to win an Academy Award and also the first ever Brazilian nominee to win an Academy Award in any of the categories.

== Personal life ==
Montenegro was married to Fernando Torres from 1954 until his death in 2008. They had two children: Fernanda Torres (b. 1965), who won the Best Actress prize at the 1986 Cannes Film Festival and the Golden Globe Award for Best Actress in a Motion Picture – Drama in 2024, and film director Cláudio Torres (b. 1962).

Regarding the adoption of a stage name, the actress has stated that she chose "Fernanda" simply because of its sonority, whilst "Montenegro" was the surname of her family's doctor.

== Honours ==
– Grã-Cruz da Ordem Nacional do Mérito: Awarded by President Fernando Henrique Cardoso on April 12, 1999.

== Quotes ==
- "My English is not good. My soul is better".
- "I'm the Old Lady from Ipanema".
- "In Brazil, I have a career. In America, I have an accent."
- "Culture is, above all, a social need. It is not a frivolity."
- "I vote Lula in the hopes of a Brazil with education, with health, in the defense of nature. I vote Lula in the hopes of a real care for science, for culture, for the culture of the arts. In the name of democracy, for president, Lula." (10/07/2022)

Academic offices
Preceded by Affonso Arinos de Mello Franco	7th Academic of the 17th chair of the Brazilian Academy of Letters; 2022–present	Incumbent
