= Festival de Gramado =

International film festival

Coordinates: 29°24′S 50°52′W

- Festival logo.
- Location: Gramado, Rio Grande do Sul, Brazil
- Founded: 1973
- Website: http://www.festivaldegramado.net/

The Gramado Film Festival (Portuguese: Festival de Gramado) is an international film festival held annually in the Brazilian city of Gramado, Rio Grande do Sul, since 1973. In 1992, the festival began to award Latin American films produced outside of Brazil. It is the biggest film festival in the country.

== History ==
Formed by the National Cinema Institute (Instituto Nacional de Cinema - INC) in January 1973, the Gramado Film Festival was originally launched at the Hydrangeas Festivity (Festa das Hortênsias), where film exhibitions were promoted between 1969 and 1971. The efforts of the artistic community, the press, tourists, and locals made the initiative a successful event. By the 1980s, it was already the most important film festival of Brazil.

== Awards ==
The festivals are held at the Festivals Palace (Palácio dos Festivais).

Currently, the festival grants awards in 24 categories (13 for Brazilian films, eight for international films, and three special awards). Its awards, called "Kikitos", are 13 inch statuettes created by the artisan Elisabeth Rosenfeld.

=== Brazilian motion pictures ===
- Best Picture
- Best Director
- Best Actor
- Best Actress
- Best Supporting Actor
- Best Supporting Actress
- Best Screenplay
- Best Film Editing
- Best Photography
- Best Original Music Score
- Best Art Direction
- Special Jury Award
- Popular Jury Award

=== Latin motion pictures ===
- Best Picture
- Best Director
- Best Actor
- Best Actress
- Best Screenplay
- Special Jury Award
- Critics Award
- Popular Jury Award

=== Special awards ===
- Troféu Oscarito
- Troféu Eduardo Abelin
- Troféu Cidade de Gramado

== See also ==
- Cinema of Brazil
