= Vidas em Jogo =

- Genre: Telenovela
- Created by: Cristianne Fridman
- Directed by: Alexandre Avancini
- Starring: Guilherme Berenguer; Thaís Fersoza; Leonardo Vieira; Vanessa Gerbelli; Julianne Trevisol
- Opening theme: "É" by Gonzaguinha
- Country of origin: Brazil
- No. of episodes: 245

Production
- Camera setup: Multi-camera
- Running time: 45 minutes

Original release
- Network: Record TV
- Release: May 3, 2011 – April 9, 2012

Related
- Ribeirão do Tempo; Máscaras

Vidas em Jogo (English: Lives at Stake, International Title: Jackpot!) is a Brazilian primetime telenovela created by Cristianne Fridman and directed by Alexandre Avancini.

The series premiered on May 3, 2011 and ended on April 9, 2012 on Rede Record at the 10 p.m. timeslot.

A total of 245 episodes of 45 minutes were produced. Due to the 2011 Pan American Games, Vidas em Jogo was preempted on October 14 and 30, so when first shown in Brazil, episodes 242–245 were shown as a separate 90-minute two episodes. In other countries, these final four episodes were aired separately.

== Plot ==
A group of friends had been playing the lottery for two years ago. On New Year's Eve, when the prize has an extraordinary value, they picked the correct numbers of the lottery and they all become millionaires.

They live their dreams but they are also involved in a terrible nightmare because they made a pact: each one has a mission to accomplish within one year and only those who can accomplish their mission shall be entitled to the other half of the prize that is stored in a saving account.

The conflicts get worse when the friends that won the lottery start to die mysteriously and the winners enter in a game of life or death in which, if they don't discover who the murderer is, they may be the next victim.

== Cast ==
=== Main cast ===
Actor	Character
Guilherme Berenguer	Francisco
Thaís Fersoza	Patricia
Leonardo Vieira	Ernesto
Vanessa Gerbelli	Divina
Julianne Trevisol	Rita
Betty Lago	Marizete
Lucinha Lins	Zizi
Beth Goulart	Regina
Denise Del Vecchio	Augusta
Marcos Pitombo	Lucas
Amandha Lee	Margarida
Simone Spoladore	Andrea
Paulo César Grande	Severino
Ricardo Petraglia	Belmiro
Cláudio Heinrich	Elton
André Di Mauro	Carlos
Bia Montez	Hermê
Letícia Colin	Juliana
Luciana Braga	Fátima
Gabriela Moreyra	Marialice
Sílvio Guindane	Ivan
Luiz Guilherme	Adalberto
Mário Gomes	Dr. Maurício
Sandro Rocha	Cleber
André Ramiro	Betão
Felipe Martins	Zé
Nill Marcondes	Vinícius
Ricky Tavares	Wellington
Sacha Bali	Jorge
Marcela Barrozo	Cacau
Aline Fanju	Roseli
Giovana Falcão	Gracena
Shaila Arsene	Tati
Rômulo Arantes Neto	Raimundo
Júlia Tanus	Jaqueline
Tati Zig	Lúcia
César Pezzuoli	Dr. Guilherme
Guilherme Prates	Daniel
Adriano Garib	Edimilson
Adriano Pettermann	Valdisnei

=== Recurring cast ===
Actor	Character
Manoelita Lustosa	Nelize
Cláudia Alencar	Adalgisa
Sílvia Bandeira	Suzana
Pedro Malta	Marcolino
Henrique Ramiro	Edmundo
