= Claudia Mauro =

Brazilian actress and dancer

Cláudia Mauro
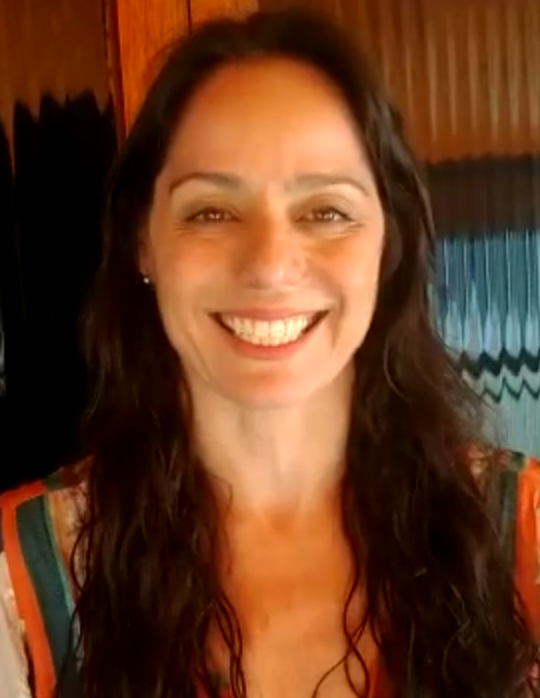
- Mauro in 2019.
- Born: Claudia Fellipe Di Mauro; February 11, 1969 (age 57); Rio de Janeiro, Guanabara, Brazil
- Education: Pontifical Catholic University of Rio de Janeiro
- Occupations: Actress; Ballerina; Writer
- Spouse: Paulo César Grande (m. 1994)
- Relatives: André Di Mauro (brother); Giovanna Antonelli (cousin)

Claudia Fellipe Di Mauro (February 11, 1969) is a Brazilian actress, dancer, and writer. Known for her work in theater and television since the late 1980s, she has received several awards, including an APTR Prize, as well as nominations for a Cesgranrio Foundation and a Botequim Cultural Award.

Mauro made her breakthrough playing the seductive Capitu in the comedy series Escolinha do Professor Raimundo (1992), which brought her popularity on Brazilian television. This led to other roles on television, such as housewife Valquíria Assunção in História de Amor (1995), nanny Lisa in Por Amor (1997), and ambitious villain Simone Moralles in Estrela de Fogo (1998), her first major character in soap operas. She has also acted in several other productions, notably as the prejudiced Angélica Cunha in Páginas da Vida (2006) and as Mary of Nazareth, mother of Jesus, in the biblical soap opera Jesus (2018).

In theater, she developed a vast career as an actress and author. Her debut was in 1982 in musical theater in the show Vira – Avesso. She also devoted herself to dance, studying abroad. Cláudia acted alongside big names in Brazilian theater, such as in Entre Amigas (1993), Bodas de Papel (2000), Nada de Pânico, and Da Vida das Marionettes. In 2017, she was critically acclaimed for her performance and authorship in the show A Vida Passou Por Aqui, for which she was nominated for the APTR Award for Best Actress and Best Text, among others. In 2023, she gained notoriety as the antagonist Pilar in the soap opera Travessia.

== Biography ==
=== Early years and education ===
Born in Rio de Janeiro, her academic training as an actress includes acting courses at Casa das Artes de Laranjeiras theater and Teatro O Tablado, two of the most renowned acting schools in Brazil. Early in her acting career, she stood out in two more theatrical productions by her brother, André Di Mauro, both musicals produced by the company Além da Lua: Vai-Vem (1982) and Azul (1983–84). In 1985, she was directed by Carlos Wilson in an adaptation of the play Os XII Trabalhos de Hércules.

In addition to her training as an actress, she studied literature at Pontifical Catholic University of Rio de Janeiro (PUC-Rio).

=== Career ===
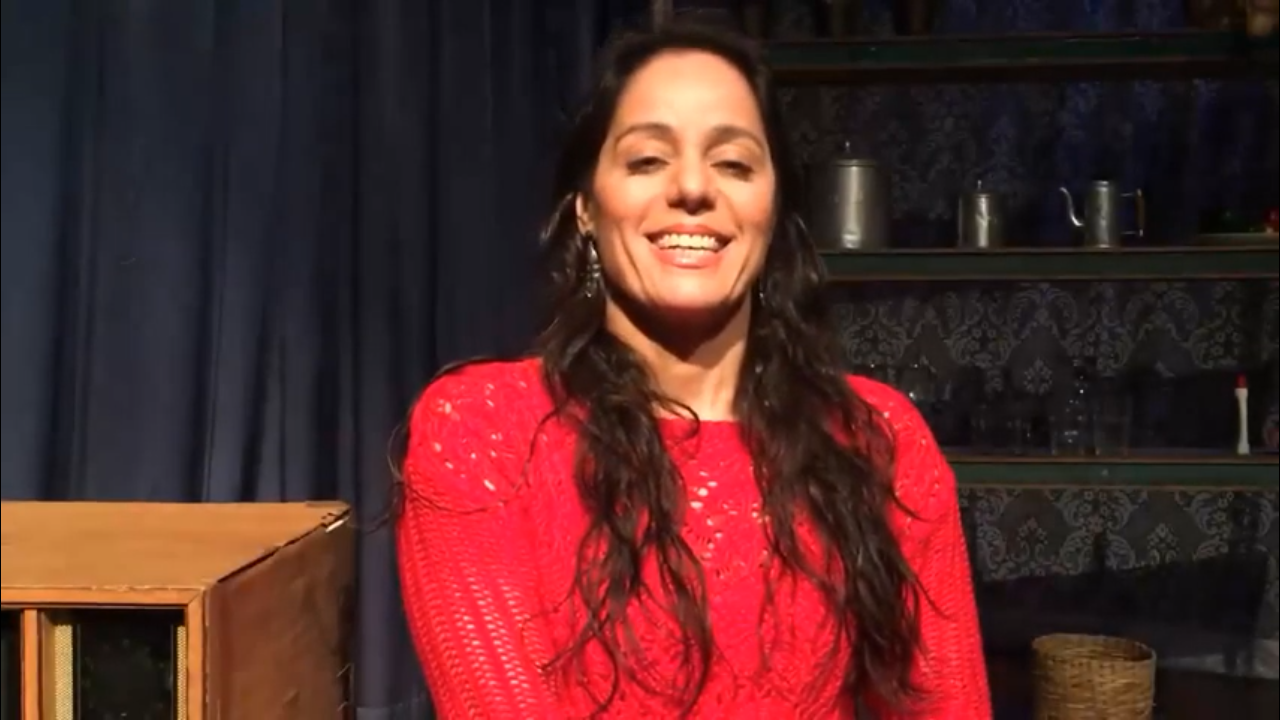
Claudia in 2017.

She lived in London for two years, between 1986 and 1987, studying ballet at Pineapple Dance Studios. Back in Brazil in 1987, she made her film debut in the biographical drama Leila Diniz, starring Louise Cardoso, and in 1988, she appeared in the musical Splish Splash, written by Flávio Marinho and directed by Wolf Maya.

In 1988, she was selected for a special appearance in the soap opera Bebê a Bordo, aired at 7 p.m. on TV Globo, where she played the secretary Dona Brígida, who worked at the agency owned by Walkíria, a character played by Márcia Real. Between 1991 and 1992, she was directed by Cininha de Paula in the play Meu Primo Walter. In 1992, she joined the cast of the comedy series Escolinha do Professor Raimundo, led by comedian Chico Anysio, where she remained for three seasons as the seductive Capitu. For playing a seductive character, she claimed to have been suffered sexual harassment by a colleague during the filming of the series. In June 2025, in an interview with the program Sem Censura, she told interviewer Cissa Guimarães that playing a sexual character had "labeled her for a long time."

Her first major television role was on Escolinha, which brought her greater visibility in the Brazilian television market. She wanted to play other roles at the network and so asked to leave the program to pursue other projects, receiving the approval of Chico Anysio and director Cininha de Paula.

In 1993, she starred in the hit play Entre Amigas, directed by Cecil Thiré, and returned to work with her brother in Flicts, a musical writer by Ziraldo. In 1995, she was invited by Emiliano Queiroz to star in his play Sara e Severino. Also in 1995, after three months off the air, she was invited by director Ricardo Waddington to star in Manoel Carlos' soap opera História de Amor, aired at 6 p.m. on TV Globo, where she played the housewife who lived in Leblon Valquíria, married to Assunção (Nuno Leal Maia), a former athlete who worked as a television sports commentator who suffers a car accident and becomes paraplegic.

In the following years, she limited her television appearances to guest roles in series such as Caça Talentos and A Justiceira. She was also part of the cast of the play Salve Amizade (1997–98). In 1997, she returned to work with Manoel Carlos, who would become one of her main partners in television, in the 9 p.m. soap opera Por Amor, playing the nanny Liza. In 1998, she moved to RecordTV, playing one of the central roles in the second phase of the soap opera Estrela de Fogo, as the ambitious villain Simone.

In the early 2000s, Claudia devoted herself to theater, acting in several plays. Her performances on stage made her one of the great references of the time. In 2000, she was on stage in two major productions, the comedy Laboratório de Humor, directed by Antonio Vinicius, and the drama Bodas de Papel, written by Maria Adelaide Amaral and directed by Carlo Milani. In 2001, she starred in Frisson, a musical by Marcelo Saback, and in 2002 she starred in Caixa 2, by Juca de Oliveira and directed by Fauzi Arap. After five years away from soap operas, she returned to acting in O Beijo do Vampiro as the maid Matilde. In 2003, she participated in Nada de Pânico, a major production directed jointly by Enrique Díaz, Marco Nanini, and Guel Arraes. That same year, she acted in A Flor do Meu Bem-Querer. In 2004, she was directed by Bibi Ferreira in DNA – Nossa Comédia.

Between 2005 and 2006, she starred in a play written by Manoel Carlos, Off, directed by Monica Lazar. At the end of the season, she was invited to return to soap operas in Manoel Carlos' Páginas da Vida, where she would play one of the most important and memorable roles of her career. In the plot, Cláudia Mauro played a prejudiced woman who died in a bus robbery. Her character aroused revulsion in the audience for her prejudiced and racist attitudes, but also provoked reflections on the dangers of hatred and intolerance.

She then returned to the stage. In 2007, she acted in O Baile. In 2008, she appeared in Eu sou o Samba, a musical by Fátima Valença, and made guest appearances in episodes of the series Faça Sua História and Guerra e Paz In 2009, she joined the cast of the 16th season of Malhação, playing Iracema, a mother devoted to her family. On stage, she acted in the production Cabaret Melinda. She took a break from acting to devote herself to motherhood.

Claudia returned to the stage four years later in Randevu do Avesso, a play directed by Jose Possi Neto that ran from 2012 to 2013. After eight years away from television and soap operas, she returned to TV Globo in the soap opera Em Família (2014), once again partnering with Manoel Carlos in what would be the author's last work for television. In the same year she also appeared in Da Vida das Marionettes, an adaptation of Ingmar Bergman's film directed by Guilherme Leme.

In 2015, she appeared in another play, Eu e Ela. In 2017, she was hired by RecordTV, where she starred in the biblical soap opera O Rico e Lázaro. In 2018, she gained widespread recognition for her portrayal of Mary of Nazareth, the mother of Jesus, in the biblical soap opera Jesus.

After seven years away from TV Globo, the actress made a triumphant return in the soap opera Um Lugar ao Sol (2021). In the plot, she played Helena Valentim, who reappears in the life of her ex-husband Paco (Otávio Muller) and shakes up his new relationship.

In 2023, she was invited to join the cast of the soap opera Travessia, at the invitation of author Glória Perez, to play the villain Pilar.

=== Personal life ===
She is the sister of actor André Di Mauro and cousin of actress Giovanna Antonelli. Since 1994, she has been married to actor Paulo César Grande, with whom she has two children.

== Filmography ==
=== Television ===
Year	Title	Role	Notes
1988	Bebê a Bordo	Dona Brígida	Guest appearance
1992–1994	Escolinha do Professor Raimundo	Capitulina / Capitu	
1995	História de Amor	Valquíria Assunção	
1996	Caça Talentos	Úrsula	Episode: "Jazão Mega Boss"
1997	A Justiceira	Selma	Episode: "Criador e Criatura"
1997	Você Decide	Roberta	Episode: "Quando Eles Amam"
1997	Por Amor	Lisa	
1998	Estrela de Fogo	Simone Moralles	
2001	Brava Gente	Emília	Episode: "História de Carnaval"
2002	O Beijo do Vampiro	Matilde	
2003	Carga Pesada	Socorro	Episode: "Não Faz Diferença"
2005	A Diarista	Laura	Episode: "Quero Ser Solineuza"
2006	Páginas da Vida	Angélica Cunha	
2008	Faça Sua História	Sara	Episode: "A Última Farra"
2008	Guerra e Paz	Lu	Episode: "Pais & Filhos"
2009	Malhação	Iracema Vidal	Season 16
2014	Em Família	Ana	
2015	As Canalhas	Angélica	Episode: "Sônia"
2015	Romance Policial – Espinosa	Marlene	Episode: "Um Assassino Entre Nós"
2016	Os Suburbanos	Suzana	Episode: "Me Amarro Nessa Casa"
2017	Sem Volta	Claire Bittencourt	
2017	O Rico e Lázaro	Ilana Bach	
2018	Jesus	Mary of Nazareth	
2020	A Divisão	Débora Bismark	Season 2
2022	Um Lugar ao Sol	Helena Valentim	
2023	Travessia	Pilar	
2024	Reis	Maacah	From Season 11
2024	O Jogo que Mudou a História	Tina	

=== Film ===
Year	Title	Role	Notes
1987	Leila Diniz	Suzy	
1997	For All - O Trampolim da Vitória	Ana	
1999	O Viajante	Sister	
1997	Tangerine Girl	Ledinha	Short film
2001	Minha Vida em Suas Mãos		
2003	Viva Sapato!	Conchita	
2006	Acredite, um Espírito Baixou em Mim	Normanda	
2006	O Amigo Invisível	Lurdes	
2016	É Fada!	Jazz Teacher	
2019	Carlinhos e Carlão	Kelly	
2019	De Pernas pro Ar 3	Marta	
2025	Todo Mundo (Ainda) Tem Problemas Sexuais	Tina	

=== Theatre ===
Year	Title
2017	A Vida Passou Por Aqui
2015	Eu e Ela
2014	Da Vida das Marionettes
2012–2013	Randevu do Avesso
2009	Cabaret Melinda
2008	Eu Sou o Samba
2007–2008	O Baile
2005–2006	Off
2004	DNA – Nossa Comédia
2003–2004	A Flor do Meu Bem-Querer
2003	Nada de Pânico (Noises Off)
2002	Caixa 2
2001	Frisson
2000	Bodas de Papel
2000	Laboratório de Humor
1997–1998	Salve Amizade
1995	Sara e Severino
1993–1994	Flicts
1993–1994	Entre Amigas
1991–1992	Meu Primo Walter
1988–1989	Splish Splash
1985–1986	Os XII Trabalhos de Hercules
1983–1984	Azul
1982	Vai-Vem
1981	Vira – Avesso

== Prizes and nomination ==
Year	Award	Category	Nominated work	Result	Ref.
2017	APTR Theatre Award	Best leading actress	A Vida Passou Aqui	Nominated	
2017	APTR Theatre Award	Best Writer	A Vida Passou Aqui	Won	
2017	Botequim Cultural Award	Best Script	A Vida Passou Aqui	Nominated	
2017	Cesgranrio Theatre Award	Best Actress	A Vida Passou Aqui	Nominated	
2017	Cesgranrio Theatre Award	Best Script	A Vida Passou Aqui	Nominated	
