= Charles Paraventi =

American-born Brazilian actor (born 1969)

- Born: Charles Adrian Paraventi Essabbá; July 4, 1969 (age 57); New York City, New York, U.S.
- Occupations: Actor, comedian
- Years active: 1995–present
- Website: charlesparaventi.com

Charles Adrian Paraventi Essabbá (born July 4, 1969) is an American-Brazilian actor and comedian.

== Life and career ==
Paraventi was born to Brazilian parents in New York City in 1969, and began appearing in magic shows and children's theatre productions at the age of 5. He and his family moved back to Brazil in 1986, where Paraventi enrolled in the Casa das Artes de Laranjeiras in Rio de Janeiro.

In addition to his film and television career, Paraventi is the founder and director of the improv sketch group Acepipes.

== Career ==
=== Film ===
Year	Title	Role	Notes
1995	O Monge e a Filha do Carrasco	Dominicius	
1997	A Ostra e o Vento	Saulo (voice)	
1998	White Dunes	Dr. Farina	
2000	Tainá – Uma Aventura na Amazônia	Boca	
2001	Maids	Cliente	
2002	City of God	"Tio Sam"	
2004	Man on Fire	Guard	
2004	Espelho d'Água	Olavo	
2004	A Dona da História	Fellow #1	
2004	Didi Quer Ser Criança	Professor Muller	
2005	Domino	Howie Stein	
2005	Um Lobisomem na Amazônia	Borges	
2010	De Pernas pro Ar	Raul	
2012	2 Coelhos	Robério (Tanajura)	
2013	Odeio o Dia dos Namorados	Helder	
2013	Até que a Sorte nos Separe 2	Garcia	
2014	Copa de Elite	Guarda Virgílio	
2014	Trash	Father Michael	
2015	Loucas Pra Casar	Geraldo José	
2015	Zoom	Assistant Director	Voice
2016	O Roubo da Taça	Osório	
2016	É Fada	Policial	
2016	Nova Amsterdam	Maurício de Nassau	
2018	Os Farofeiros	Rocha	
2019	Marighella	Bob	
2019	Encena: O Jogo dos Atos	Himself	
2019	O Braço Direito	Júlio	
2019	Socorro, Virei Uma Garota!	Solano	
2020	Tô Ryca 2	Marcão	
2021	Yakuza Princess	Armond	

=== Television ===
Year	Title	Role	Notes
1999	Flora Encantada	Bóris	
1999–2004	Globo Ciência	Galileu	
2000	A Muralha	Padre	
2000	Você Decide		
2002	Sítio do Picapau Amarelo	Doutor Zamenhof	Episódie: "A Reforma Da Natureza"
2003–2006	Malhação	Professor Afrânio	
2005	The Snake King	Ronald	TV movie
2010	Vampiro Carioca	Ernestinho	
2014	Estranha Mente	Jorge	
2014	Não Tá Fácil Pra Ninguém		
2015	As Canalhas	Armando	
2015	Santo Forte	Passageiro Surtado	
2015-2016	Chapa Quente	Amauri, primo do Marreta	
2016	Ômicron		
2017	Enredo de Bamba	José	
2017	Era Uma Vez Uma História	Dom João VI	
2018	Xilindró	Zica	
2018	Ilha de Ferro	Rogério	
2018	Pais de Primeira	Jair	
2018	Malhação: Vidas Brasileiras	Tobias	
2018-2019	Rio Heroes	Scott	
2019	Cine Holliúdy	Morte	

== Stage credits ==
Year	Theater Play	Notes
1993	Terror na Praia	
1993	O Mágico de Oz	
1994	Perdoa-me Por me Traíres	
1995	Lear	
2008–2010	Acepipes	As director
2011	Os Capangas	
