= Escolinha do Professor Raimundo =

Brazilian comedy television series

- Genre: Comedy; Sitcom; Escolinha
- Directed by: Cininha de Paula; Paulo Ghelli; Cassiano Filho; Alex Cabral
- Country of origin: Brazil
- Original language: Portuguese

Production
- Running time: 25/30 minutes
- Production company: Central Globo de Produção

Original release
- Network: Rede Globo
- Release: 4 August 1990 – 28 May 1995

Escolinha do Professor Raimundo (literally Professor Raymond's Little School) is a Brazilian escolinha comedy TV sketch and later TV show led by Chico Anysio and aired on various comedy shows for over 38 years. There, Anysio played Professor Raimundo, a teacher in charge of an adult education class.

It premiered on its own television program on August 4, 1957 and on Rede Globo from 1973 until May 28, 1995. It aired in 1999 as part of the comedy show Zorra Total, remaining until October 2000. Shortly after no longer being broadcast on Globo due to the low audience results, it nevertheless returned to its original and independent format as a television show airing from March 26 to December 28, 2001, when it was aired its last season.

As of October 4, 2010, reruns were aired on Viva channel.

In 2015, Canal Viva produced, in partnership with Globo, a revival of the old Escolinha, with 7 episodes (2 of which were only broadcast by Globo). The crew included three members of Chico Anysio's family, all with experience in the original series: direction by his niece Cininha de Paula, writing by his son Nizo Neto (who played Seu Ptolomeu in the original series), and teacher Raimundo was played by his son Bruno Mazzeo (writer in the old Escolinha). The revival lasted until 2020 when it was cancelled due to the COVID-19 state of emergency in the country, the 2015 revival is in reruns.

== History ==
=== Radio ===
The comedy format of a teacher and his students already existed on the Brazilian radio, having as a precursor Escolinha da Dona Olinda created by the humorist Nhô Totico and broadcast by Rádio Record during the 1930s. Escolinha do Professor Raimundo was created in 1952 by Haroldo Barbosa for Rádio Mayrink Veiga. It consisted of a classroom where Professor Raimundo Nonato (Chico Anysio) served as a foil for the jokes of three students: the smart one, played by Afrânio Rodrigues, the dumb one, played by João Fernandes, and a cunning one, played by Zé Trindade. Later they would be joined by Antônio Carlos Pires.

=== Television ===
With the success of the radio show, the format got a television version in 1957, on TV Rio show Noites Cariocas. The intelligent student was now played by João Loredo; its opposite by Castrinho; Vagareza was the trickster who tried to deceive the teacher; and Ary Leite, a stuttering and confused student. Escolinha was then aired on TVs Excelsior and Tupi, until getting into Rede Globo, where it was aired as part of the shows Chico City (1973), in its format of three students and a teacher, and Chico Anysio Show (1988), with a larger, 20-student classroom

The idea of turning the format into a solo program came from Chico Anysio. It premiered on August 4, 1990, directed by Cassiano Filho, Paulo Ghelli and Cininha de Paula. It was recorded initially at the studios of the defunct TV Tupi, at the former Cassino da Urca, and later at Cinédia and at the Tycoon and Renato Aragão studios (now Casablanca Studios), all in Rio de Janeiro, Escolinha aired on Saturdays at 9:30 pm. It premiered with twenty students, and from October 29, with the addition of three, began airing Monday through Friday at 5:30 pm

On June 11, 1992, the program number 500 aired. Escolinha stopped being shown on Saturdays, moving to Wednesday nights, but after a while the change was undone. By then the cast had 37 actors, including students and supporting characters.

In 1995 the evening editions began to be reran. Saturday's program aired on Wednesdays, returning to Saturday and ending on Sunday afternoons. As the changes did not work, Escolinha was cancelled in May 1995 to make way for the soap opera Malhação.

In 1999, Chico Anysio decided to take Escolinha on stage in Brazil and his tour kicked off on October 8 for free at Shopping Grande Rio, in São João de Meriti, Rio de Janeiro. In the same year it was once again aired on Rede Globo, now as a sketch in the program Zorra Total, remaining in the air until October 2000.

A final season, again as a 25-minute solo program, aired Monday through Friday between March and December 2001.

== Cast ==
Actor	Character
Chico Anysio†	Professor Raimundo Nonato

=== Students ===
==== 1990 decade ====
Actor/Actress	Character
Aldine Muller	Dona Flor
André Mattos	Pedro Bó
Antônio Carlos Pires†	Joselino Barbacena
Antônio Pedro	Bicalho
Berta Loran	Manuela D'Além Mar
Brandão Filho†	Sandoval Quaresma
Brita Brazil	Flora Própolis
Castrinho	Geraldo
César Macedo†	Seu Eugênio
Cláudia Jimenez†	Dona Cacilda
Claudia Mauro	Capitu
Costinha†	Mazarito
David Pinheiro	Armando Volta
Dedé Santana	Bomfiglio
Eliezer Motta	Batista
Emiliano Queiroz	Dirceu Borboleta
Francisco Milani†	Pedro Pedreira
Grande Othelo†	Eustáquio
Ivon Curi†	Gaudêncio
Jaime Filho†	Suppapou Uaçi
João Netto	Zé Modesto
Jorge Loredo†	Zé Bonitinho
Lúcio Mauro†	Aldemar Vigário
Lug de Paula	Seu Boneco
Marcos Plonka†	Samuel Blaustein
Marina Miranda	Mandala
Mário Tupinambá†	Bertoldo Brecha
Nádia Maria†	Célia Caridosa de Mello
Nizo Neto	Ptolomeu
Olney Cazarré†	João Bacurinho
Orival Pessini†	Patropi
Orlando Drummond†	Seu Peru
Paulo César Rocha	Paulo Cintura
Pedro Bismarck	Nerso da Capetinga
Roberto Guilherme†	Carlos Carreta
Rogério Cardoso†	Rolando Lero
Rony Cócegas†	Galeão Cumbica
Sérgio Mallandro	Mallandro
Stella Freitas	Cândida
Tássia Camargo	Marina da Glória
Tom Cavalcante	João Canabrava
Tim Rescala	Capilé Sorriso
Walter D'Ávila†	Baltazar da Rocha
Zezé Macedo†	Dona Bela
Zilda Cardoso†	Catifunda

==== 2000 decade ====
Actor/Actress	Character
Alcione Mazzeo	Dona Angélica
Alice Borges	Dona Neura
André Lucas	Aranha
André Mattos	Seu Fininho
Antônio Pedro	José Bonvê
Arnaud Júnior	Ramório
Berta Loran	Sara Rebeca
Cláudia Jimenez	Dona Cacilda
Francisco Milani†	Pedro Pedreira
Cláudio Cunha†	Gaúcho
Daniele Valente	Dona Tesinha
Elaine Mickely	Terezuda
Fafy Siqueira	Dona Lusa do Canindé
George Savalla†	Carequinha
Heloísa Périssé	Tati
Ingrid Guimarães	Leandra Borges
Lúcio Mauro†	Aldemar Vigário
Lug de Paula	Seu Boneco
Maurício Manfrini	Paulinho Gogó
Nairon Barreto	Zé Lezin
Orlando Drummond†	Seu Peru
Pedro Haidar	Tiquinho
Rogério Cardoso†	Rolando Lero
Tom Cavalcante	João Canabrava
Viviane Araújo	Rosinha
