= Vitória (2014 TV series) =

- Genre: Drama
- Created by: Cristianne Fridman
- Directed by: Edgard Miranda
- Opening theme: "Tente Outra Vez" by Raul Seixas
- Country of origin: Brazil
- Original language: Portuguese
- No. of episodes: 208

Production
- Production locations: Petrópolis, Brazil
- Camera setup: Multi-camera
- Running time: 45 minutes

Original release
- Network: Rede Record
- Release: June 2, 2014 – March 20, 2015

Vitória is a Brazilian primetime telenovela created, developed and written by Cristianne Fridman and directed by Edgard Miranda.

The series premiered on Monday, June 2, 2014 at 9:15 p.m. (BRT/AMT) on Rede Record, replacing Pecado Mortal. The series ended on March 20, 2015 and was replaced by Os Dez Mandamentos in a brand new 8:30 p.m. timeslot.

Thaís Melchior and Bruno Ferrari star as the protagonists, while Juliana Silveira star as the main antagonist.

== Plot ==
Artur (Bruno Ferrari), the rich young owner of Arminho Ranch, holds a grudge against his alleged father Gregório (Antônio Grassi). At the age of twelve, Artur, who was baptized as Mossoró, became paraplegic after he fell off a horse given by his father Gregório, who never managed to cope with this tragedy and ended up rejecting Mossoró.

Clarice (Beth Goulart) is Artur's mother, Gregório's first wife, and teaches at Priscila Schiller school. She can't live with the troubled relationship between her son and her husband and decides to run away with her first born to Curaçao, hiding the secret of his father's identity for years, until, upon realizing Artur's thirst for vengeance, she reveals that Gregório is not his biological father. But this doesn't alleviate his hate, and he commits his mother to a psychiatric hospital so she won't get in the way of his revenge. Clarice eventually becomes addicted to medications.

Dominated by his desire for vengeance, Artur returns to Brazil to implement his plan to destroy the Training Center Ranch Altacyr Ferreira, Gregório's property, where he spent his youth. Diana (Thais Melchior) was born from Gregório's second marriage and is Mossoró's (Ricky Tavares) sister. Both are children of Gregório's second wife, now deceased. Diana inherited her father's passion for horses.

She is disturbed by the thought that she committed incest with Artur, who is not really her brother. While going through this psychological torture, she has a new affair with Raphael (Rodrigo Phavanello), creating a love triangle full of emotions, intrigues and revenges.

== Cast ==
=== Main cast ===
| Actor | Character |
|---|---|
| Bruno Ferrari | Artur |
| Thaís Melchior | Diana |
| Juliana Silveira | Priscila Schiller |
| Beth Goulart | Clarice |
| Lucinha Lins | Zuzu |
| Antônio Grassi | Gregório |
| Jonas Bloch | Ramiro Pessoa |
| Heitor Martinez | Caíque |
| Paulo César Grande | Bernardo |
| Gabriel Gracindo | Ziggy |
| Maytê Piragibe | Renata |
| Leonardo Vieira | Tadeu |
| Rodrigo Phavanello | Rafael |
| Rafaela Mandelli | Sabrina |
| Raymundo de Souza | Ednaldo |
| Roberta Gualda | Anastácia |
| Cláudio Gabriel | Eduardo (Edu) |
| Ricky Tavares | Mossoró |
| Marcos Pitombo | Paulão |
| Luciana Braga | Matilde |
| Sílvio Guindane | Paulo Henrique |
| André De Biase | Dante |
| Aline Borges | Laíza |
| André Di Mauro | Jorge |
| Bruna di Túllio | Luciene de Melo Faria |
| Thelmo Fernandes | William |
| Nina de Pádua | Yone Gusmão |
| Rocco Pitanga | Nelito |
| Karen Marinho | Kátia |
| Leandro Léo | Ricardinho |
| Letícia Medina | Beatriz |
| Gustavo Leão | Quim |
| Henrique Ramiro | Alex |
| Augusto Garcia | Bruno |
| Gustavo Ottoni | Javier Rodriguez |
| Créo Kellab | Pedro |
| César Pezzuoli | Manoel |
| Alessandra Loyola | Analice |
| Liége Müller | Bárbara |
| Raphael Montagner | Enzo |
| Ricardo Ferreira | Virgulino |
| Camila Avancini | Rosa |
| Rose Lima | Catarina |
| Pablo Mothé | Cícero (Cicinho) |
| Diego Kropotoff | Vinicíus |
| Alice Rodrigues | Isabele |
| Letícia Pedro | Rebeca |
| Victória Diniz | Gabriela (Gabi) |
| Zeca Gurgel | Orlando (Dinho) |

=== Guest appearances ===
| Actor | Character |
|---|---|
| Flávia Monteiro | Rúbia |
| Cássio Ramos | Pablo |
| Marcelo Escorel | Fernando |
| Dado Dolabella | Léo |
| Eduardo Pires | Felipe |
| Bruno Chateaubriand | Mariano Morgado (MM) |
