= Roberto Santucci =

Brazilian filmmaker (born 1967)

Roberto Santucci (born 1967) is a Brazilian filmmaker. Santucci holds degrees from the Columbia College Hollywood and University of California, Los Angeles. He started his career as a filmmaker directing short films, and then action films. However, due to low box offices, and even a film that was never released, Alucinados, Santucci decided to "do a film that they [the producers] want to do". This was De Pernas pro Ar, a commercial success, followed by other comedy commercial success, including Até que a Sorte nos Separe and De Pernas pro Ar 2.

== Biography ==
Santucci was born into an upper-middle-class family in Rio de Janeiro in 1967. In 1989, he moved to Hollywood, United States, where he graduated in cinema from Columbia College and completed extension courses at the University of California.

In 1992, he served as an assistant editor on School Ties, directed by Robert Mandel, and worked on Legends of the Fall, released in 1994, directed by Edward Zwick. In 1994, he wrote, produced, directed, and edited the short films Helpless and Bienvenido a Brazil, the latter of which was finalized in 1995.

He directed and edited Bellini and the Sphinx (Bellini e a Esfinge), released in 2002. An adaptation of the novel by Tony Bellotto, the film won the Audience Award for Best Film at the Festival do Rio.

He also worked on Olé – Um Movie Cabra da Peste (2000). Five years later, he produced, directed, wrote, and edited the feature film Alucinados, which won Audience Awards for Best Film at the Los Angeles Brazilian Film Festival, the Brazilian Film Festival of Madrid, and the first Paulínia Film Festival.

In 2011, he released one of his most notable works, the film De Pernas Pro Ar, which reached an audience of over 3.5 million in theaters. He also directed Até que a Sorte nos Separe, starring Leandro Hassum, released in 2012, which drew more than 1 million spectators.

Santucci has expressed interest in moving beyond comedies to direct action films, dramas, and thrillers, projects he refers to as "personal projects."

== Filmography ==
- Helpless (1994; short film)
- Bienvenido Brazil (1995; short film)
- Olé – Um Movie Cabra da Peste (2000)
- Bellini and the Sphinx (2001)
- Alucinados (2008)
- De Pernas pro Ar (2010)
- Sequestro Relâmpago (2010)
- Até que a Sorte nos Separe (2012)
- De Pernas pro Ar 2 (2012)
- Odeio o Dia dos Namorados (2013)
- Até que a Sorte nos Separe 2 (2013)
- De Pernas pro Ar 3 (2015)
- Os Farofeiros (2018)
- Os Farofeiros 2 (2024)
