= Ricky Tavares =

Brazilian actor and model (born 1991)

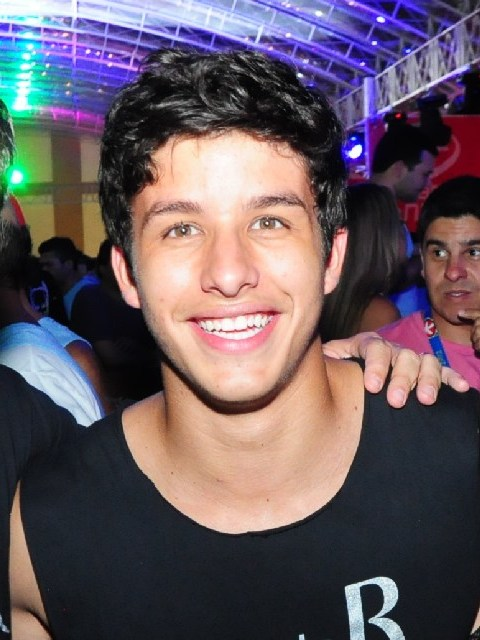
- Tavares in 2012
- Born: Marcílio Henrique Tavares Gonçalves; 28 August 1991; Brasília
- Alma mater: Teatro O Tablado
- Occupation: Actor, television actor, stage actor, model, film actor
- Partner(s): Marcela Barrozo
- Relatives: Juliana Xavier

Marcílio Henrique Tavares Gonçalves (born 28 August 1991), better known as Ricky Tavares, is a Brazilian actor and model.

== Life and career ==
Tavares was born in Brasília, and moved to Rio de Janeiro with his family during childhood. His siblings Juliana Xavier and Dharck Tavares are also actors. His cousin Tiago Santiago is a telenovela author and director.

Tavares studied at the drama school O Tablado. He began his artistic career in the theater, at age 16, playing the hunter Gaston in the play Beauty and the Beast. Still in the theater, he was in Pintando o Sete and The Wonderful Wizard of Oz. His first television appearance was in 2009 in the telenovela Promessas de Amor on RecordTV with the character Aurélio Pitini (Pit). In the same year, he played the character Rodrigo in TV Globo's Malhação ID. In 2013, the actor played his first leading role in the miniseries José do Egito.

Tavares joined the cast of several other soap operas, as well as Vidas em Jogo, A Terra Prometida, Jesus, Gênesis, among others. The artist also appears in the Netflix original series Maldivas.

For seven years, Tavares was in a relationship with actress Marcela Barrozo. The couple broke up in 2019.

== Filmography ==
=== Television ===
Year(s)	Title	Role(s)	Notes
2009	Mutantes: Promessas de Amor	Aurélio Pitini (Pit)	
2009	Malhação	Rodrigo Cerqueira	17th season
2011	Vidas em Jogo	Wellington Nobre Batista	
2013	José do Egito	Young José	Episodes: "January 30 – February 20"
2013	Casamento Blindado	Diogo	New Year's Special
2014	Milagres de Jesus	Davi	Episode: "O Homem Hidrópico"
2014	Vitória	Mossoró Ferreira	
2016	A Terra Prometida	Zaqueu	
2018	Jesus	Judas Tadeu	
2021	Gênesis	Harã	
2022	Além da Ilusão	Inácio	
2022	Maldivas	Miguel	

=== Film ===
Year	Title	Role	Notes
2022	Rocinha, Toda História Tem Dois Lados		

=== Internet ===
Year	Title	Role
2015	Discutindo a Relação	Fred Ribeiro
2017	Super Crianças	Morel

== Theater ==
Year	Play
2013	Apaixonados
