= José do Egito =

2013 Brazilian miniseries by RecordTV

- Genre: Miniseries; Biblical epic
- Directed by: Alexandre Avancini
- Starring: Ângelo Paes Leme; Maytê Piragibe; Leonardo Vieira; Bianca Rinaldi; Celso Frateschi; Carla Cabral; Taumaturgo Ferreira; Larissa Maciel; Samara Felippo; Eduardo Lago; Iran Malfitano; Mylla Christie; Caio Junqueira; Guilherme Winter; Felipe Cardoso; Vitor Hugo; Denise Del Vecchio; Andréa Avancini; Gustavo Leão; Camila Rodrigues
- Theme music composer: Daniel Figueiredo
- Opening theme: "Egiptopen"
- Country of origin: Brazil
- Original language: Portuguese
- No. of episodes: 38

Production
- Production company: RecordTV

Original release
- Network: RecordTV
- Release: January 30 – October 9, 2013

José do Egito (English: Joseph from Egypt) is a Brazilian miniseries produced and broadcast by RecordTV. It premiered on January 30, 2013 and ended on October 9, 2013. It is based on the biblical account of the Book of Genesis that deals with the patriarch Joseph, son of Jacob.

== Synopsis ==
The story begins with the birth of Joseph around 1716 BC, in Haran, region of Mesopotamia, as a ‘miracle‘ son. He is the son of Rachel, a sterile woman and the most loved wife of Jacob, who is already an old man when his son is born. Joseph soon becomes the favorite son, and eventually receives an ornamented tunic from Jacob, symbolizing he was chosen as his successor. Unaccepting of their father‘s decision and overcome by envy, the brothers decide to teach Joseph a lesson, throwing him into a deep well with no way out, and then sell their brother as a slave. Joseph is taken to Egypt.

The young Hebrew becomes the servant of Potiphar, commander of the Pharaoh Apepi‘s guard. Sati, the commander‘s wife, begins to feel a burning desire for Joseph, and does everything to conquer his heart, but fails: young man is in love with Asenath, daughter of an Egyptian priest Potipherah. Furious, she gets back at Joseph by lying and saying the Hebrew tried to rape her. Potiphar sends him to prison.

Pharaoh Apepi begins to be tormented by strange nightmares and, when he finds out that Joseph has the gift to interpret dreams, he calls him to the royal palace. After hearing Apepi‘s dream, Joseph reveals that Egypt will enjoy seven years of bounty, which will then be replaced by long period of famine. Joseph also says it will be necessary to store enough food during the period of bounty to supply the people during the times of famine. When hunger arrives in Canaan, Jacob sends his sons in search of food in Egypt, because he learns it is the only place on earth with food. Upon arriving before the respected governor of Egypt, Jacob‘s sons do not recognize him as their brother under the Egyptian clothing. But Joseph recognizes them and he is forced to hide in order to cry, in deep pain, almost twenty years after the betrayal. Now, only Joseph can save the brothers who made him suffer so much in the past.

== Cast ==
- Ângelo Paes Leme as José
- Maytê Piragibe as Azenate
- Carla Cabral as Bila
- Samara Felippo as Diná
- Mylla Christie as Raquel
- Caio Junqueira as Simeon
- Eduardo Lago as Pentephres
- Sandro Rocha as Seneb
- Iran Malfitano as Hapu
- Babi Xavier as Elisa
- Gustavo Leão as Benjamin
- Vitor Hugo as Judá
- Marcela Barrozo as Diná (young)
- Paulo Nigro as Siquém
- Ricky Tavares as José (young)
- Larissa Maciel as Sati
- Camila Rodrigues as Tamar
- Guilherme Winter as Rúben
- Andréa Avancini as Zilpa
- Felipe Cardoso as Levi
- Nanda Ziegler as Naamá
- Thelmo Fernandes as Jetur
- Juliana Boller as Mara
- Bruno Padilha as Kedar
- Henrique Ramiro as Onã
- Rafael Sardão as Nekau
- Caetano O'Maihlan as Gibar
- Joelson Medeiros as Mitri
- Henri Pagnoncelli as Hamor
- Daniel Bouzas as Thot
- João Vitor as Selá
- Elder Gatelly as Ismael
- Janaína Moura as Rebeca
- Bia Braga as Mara (young)
- Fernando Sampaio as Naftali
- Eduardo Spinetti as Dã
- Vasco Valentino as Gade
- Eduardo Melo as Benjamin (young)
- Binho Beltrão as Er
- Edu Porto as Issacar
- Wendell Duarte as Aser
- Acacio Ferreira as Zebulom
- Anna Rita Cerqueira as Azenate (young)
- Eliete Cigarini as Grande Sacerdotisa
- Maurício Ribeiro as Manassés

== Production ==
Shooting includes scenes recorded in the Atacama Desert in Chile, Egypt and Israel. For the scenery two cities were built representing Avaris, and Hebron.

== Rating ==
Season	Timeslot (BRT/AMT)	Episodes	First aired		Last aired	
Season	Timeslot (BRT/AMT)	Episodes	Date	Viewers (In points)	Date	Viewers (In points)
1	Wednesday 9:45pm	38	January 30, 2013	12.1	October 9, 2013	13.7
