= Just Another Christmas =

2020 Brazilian film by Roberto Santucci

- Promotional poster
- Portuguese: Tudo Bem no Natal que Vem
- Directed by: Roberto Santucci
- Written by: Paulo Cursino
- Produced by: André Carreira
- Starring: Leandro Hassum; Elisa Pinheiro; Danielle Winits
- Cinematography: Julio Costantini
- Edited by: Eduardo Hartung; Roberto Santucci
- Music by: Lucas Marcier; Fabiano Krieger; Gustavo Salgado
- Production companies: Camisa Listrada Films; Netflix Brazil
- Distributed by: Netflix
- Release date: December 3, 2020
- Running time: 101 minutes
- Country: Brazil
- Language: Portuguese

Just Another Christmas (Portuguese: Tudo Bem no Natal que Vem) is a 2020 Brazilian Christmas fantasy comedy drama film directed by Roberto Santucci and starring Leandro Hassum, Elisa Pinheiro, and Danielle Winits. Hassum portrays Jorge, a father who begins awakening on Christmas Eve with no memories of the year before, repeatedly in a time loop.

Filmed in Rio de Janeiro in December 2019, Just Another Christmas was released on December 3, 2020, on Netflix. Within the first month of being released, 26 million households viewed the movie on Netflix or 48.43 million hours.

== Plot ==
In 2010, a man named Jorge, who was born on Christmas and hates celebrating his birthday, awakens on Christmas Eve to prepare for the upcoming holiday. After rudely talking about his grandfather-in-law, Vô Nhanhão, who has not talked for many years, Jorge is told by Nhanhão that he will learn the true meaning of Christmas. That same night, Jorge is told by his wife Laura to dress up as Santa and to get on the roof to appear as the jolly old man. By accident, Jorge falls off the roof and knocks himself unconscious.

In 2011, a confused Jorge awakens on Christmas Eve, with a new car, a recently received promotion, and a secret smoking addiction, but with no memories of the past year. Like the year before, Jorge encounters some of the same events, such as Leo asking him for money, Luana inviting her new boyfriend, and Tio Victor being offended at the dinner table and running away with the dinner turkey.

Once again, Jorge wakes up on Christmas Eve, this time in 2012, with no memories of the year prior. To not have to spend another Christmas Eve with the family, Jorge decides to take sleeping pills when he awakens each year. In 2021, Jorge is stopped by Laura from taking the pills, and he is forced to confront the changes in his life. Throughout the day, Jorge learns that he had two bypass surgeries due to his smoking addiction and that he has an on-going affair with Márcia, his secretary at work.

In 2022, Jorge awakens to find out that he has divorced Laura and moved in with Márcia, also finding a pre-recorded video, from the Jorge who lives through the year, telling him to enjoy his new life. After a suicide attempt, Jorge learns that his son has graduated from college, Tio Victor has died, and that Laura still has feelings for him. Near the end of the night, Jorge begs Laura to not give up on their relationship, to the dismay of Márcia.

In 2023, Jorge wakes up on a secluded island and learns that he has successfully gotten back with Laura. Still trapped by Nhanhão's curse, Jorge awakens each year and goes on vacation with his family every Christmas Eve. In the following years, Jorge learns that he has become a grandfather, that his brother-in-law, Leo, has become rich, and that his daughter has developed terminal breast cancer. To spend time with his daughter, the pair watch her favorite movie, Shrek the Halls, which she had begged him to watch back in 2010. The next year, Jorge learns that his daughter has died.

That same day, Jorge is told by Nhanhão to simply "make a wish." After Laura brings out his birthday cake, and Jorge makes a wish, Jorge awakens on Christmas Eve in 2010, determined to make better life choices in his second try on life (including saving a breast cancer leaflet for his daughter).

== Cast ==
- Leandro Hassum as Jorge
- Elisa Pinheiro as Laura
- Danielle Winits as Márcia
- Louise Cardoso as Teodora
- Rodrigo Fagundes as Luiz Cláudio
- Arianne Botelho as Aninha
- Miguel Rômulo as Leo
- José Rubens Chachá as Tio Victor
- Levi Ferreira as Vô Nhanhão
- Lola Fanucchi as Luana
- Daniel Filho as Seu Pedro

== See also ==
- List of Christmas films
