= Os Farofeiros =

- Theatrical release poster
- Directed by: Roberto Santucci
- Screenplay by: Paulo Cursino
- Produced by: André Carreira
- Starring: Maurício Manfrini; Cacau Protásio; Antônio Fragoso; Danielle Winits; Charles Paraventi; Elisa Pinheiro; Nilton Bicudo
- Production companies: Camisa Listrada; Fox International Productions; Panorama Filmes; Telecine; Globo Filmes
- Distributed by: Paris Filmes; Downtown Filmes; 20th Century Fox International
- Release date: 8 March 2018
- Running time: 103 minutes
- Country: Brazil
- Language: Portuguese
- Budget: R$6 million
- Box office: R$36.8 million

Os Farofeiros is a 2018 Brazilian comedy film directed by Roberto Santucci, produced by Camisa Listrada and Panorama Filmes, written by Paulo Cursino, and starring Maurício Manfrini, Cacau Protásio, Antônio Fragoso, Charles Paraventi, Nilton Bicudo, Aline Campos, Elisa Pinheiro, and Danielle Winits. Set in Maricá, the plot revolves around four friends who bring their families together to celebrate New Year's in a beach house, but the party turns into chaos due to a secret that involves everyone.

Os Farofeiros was released in Brazil on March 8, 2018, by Downtown and Paris Filmes. The film grossed over R$36.8 million during its theatrical run, becoming a box office hit with more than 2.5 million viewers. It ranked as the 17th most-watched film in Brazilian cinemas in 2018. Despite its commercial success, the movie received mixed reviews from critics, who generally described its humor as full of "cliches and stereotypes" but praised the cast's performance and chemistry.

At the 18th Grande Otelo Awards, held by the Brazilian Academy of Cinema, the film received a nomination for Best Comedy Feature. On March 7, 2024, a sequel titled Os Farofeiros 2 was released.

== Synopsis ==
Four work friends — Lima (Maurício Manfrini), Alexandre (Antônio Fragoso), Rocha (Charles Paraventi), and Diguinho (Nilton Bicudo) — plan to spend the long New Year's holiday at a beach house rented by Lima. However, upon arrival, they realize they've gotten themselves into a huge mess. The place isn't the upscale Búzios as expected, but rather Maringuaba, a neighborhood in Maricá. The house is abandoned and falling apart, completely different from what was promised. The beach is always crowded, and mosquitoes are everywhere.

Meanwhile, Alexandre is hiding a work-related secret: The company they all work for is struggling financially, and he’s been tasked with firing one of his friends. Chaos escalates as the secret slowly gets out, and everyone starts trying to win Alexandre's favor to avoid being the one laid off.

== Cast ==
- Maurício Manfrini as Paulo "Lima" Gonçalves Lima
- Cacau Protasio as Jussara Ferrari de Lima
- Danielle Winits as Renata Salomão
- Antônio Fragoso as Alexandre "Alê" Salomão
- Charles Paraventi as Pedro "Rocha" Pereira Rocha
- Elisa Pinheiro as Vanete Pereira Rocha
- Nilton Bicudo as Rodrigo "Diguinho" dos Santos Pena
- Aline Campos as Elen
- Felipe Roque as Adônis
- Tony Tornado as Dr. Alberto
- Alice Borges as Teacher Elizângela
- Taísa Lima as Bárbara
- Felipe Adler as Roberto
- Nathália Costa as Karolayne Ferrari de Lima
- Gabriel Rocha as Enzo "Pitoco" Ferrari de Lima
- Ana Cecília Banal as Anita Pereira Rocha
- Melissa Nóbrega as Isabela "Bebela" Salomão
- Theo Medon as Fábio "Fabinho" Salomão
- Duda Batista as Cristina "Tininha" Salomão
- Eduardo Martini as Dona Hercília

== Production ==
The film is directed by Roberto Santucci, one of Brazil’s highest-grossing filmmakers, particularly known for his comedy films. It is produced by Camisa Listrada and Panorama Filmes, with co-production by Globo Filmes, and André Carreira as the executive producer. The screenplay was written by Paulo Cursino.

The idea for the film’s plot began to take shape while Paulo was working on the 2012 film Até que a Sorte nos Separe 2, also directed by Santucci. Specifically, it was inspired by a scene in which the characters stayed at a hotel where "everything went wrong." This sparked the idea of creating a movie that would expand on a similar premise. The creators drew inspiration from classic American comedy films, such as National Lampoon's Vacation (1983), to structure the story.

With a total budget of around 6 million reais, the film's key scenes were shot in a house located in the Itaipuaçu neighborhood of Maricá, in the state of Rio de Janeiro.

=== Cast ===
The film brings together a diverse cast in its central roles. Cacau Protásio and Danielle Winits lead the production as its two strongest names. Antônio Fragoso was personally invited by the director to play his first leading role in a film.

Actor and comedian Maurício Manfrini, known for his breakout role as Paulinho Gogó, was cast as one of the film's protagonists — marking his first major cinema role. During a promotional event for the film in Recife, Manfrini stated:

Lima and Paulinho have very similar traits. At first, I struggled to adapt these characteristics while still finding my own approach to the new role.

Aline Campos (at that time known as Aline Riscado) also portrays her first cinematic character in the film. In an interview, she admits facing prejudice for being new to acting, as well as the stigma of having been nationally known as a commercial model. She also discusses her relationship with her co-stars:

I was lucky enough to land a wonderful cast. We always joked around behind the scenes — it was such a joy. That's why I hope there are many sequels ahead!

== Release ==
Os Farofeiros premiered directly in Brazilian cinemas on March 8, 2018, distributed by Paris Filmes and Downtown Filmes.

== Reception ==
=== Box office ===
On its opening weekend, Os Farofeiros became the second most-watched film in Brazilian cinemas, drawing 489,000 viewers — just behind Black Panther, which sold 550,000 tickets. During that weekend alone, the film grossed over R$7 million. Within just one week of release, it surpassed 1 million viewers, cementing its status as a major box office hit. By the end of its theatrical run, the film had attracted 2,604,658 moviegoers and earned a total of R$36,820,843. According to Ancine (Brazil's National Film Agency), the movie ranked among the top 20 most-watched films in Brazilian cinemas in 2018, landing at 17th place overall. Among Brazilian productions, it was the second highest-grossing domestic film of the year.

=== Critical response ===
Os Farofeiros received mixed to negative reviews from film critics. On the Brazilian review aggregator AdoroCinema, it holds an average rating of 2.4 out of 5 stars based on 9 press reviews. Taiani Mendes gave the film a rating of 2.5/5, which classifies it as "Average", and said that the film "often resembles a bridge, blending relatable situations with classic cinema — a quality often missing in sterilized Globo Filmes comedies. While its moral resolution feels clumsy, the attempt at harmony suggests a promising new direction for (lucrative) mainstream Brazilian comedy".

Pablo Bazarello from the website CinePOP praised the cast's performance: "The humor may be straightforward, but as mentioned, it's elevated by the cast's undeniable charm, electric chemistry, and razor-sharp improvisational skills. From Winits' scene-stealing caricature and Protásio's lightning-fast comebacks to Manfrini's shameless bravado, Pinheiro's endearing sweetness [...] and Riscado's delightful naivety - every performance clicks together with watchlike precision."

Robinson Samulak Alves from the website Cinema com Rapadura noted: "At its core, the film embraces physical comedy — a clear nod to classic Brazilian chanchadas [...] Yet it offers more than just slapstick and face-slapping gags. The script cleverly leverages its own structure to orchestrate the chaos, and ultimately, every absurdity lands with surprising logic."

The newspaper O Globo offered a sardonic take: "Granted, the 'working-class' stereotype involves loud voices, hogging public spaces, and rolling in beach sand — we get it. But must every character shriek nonstop? One can only assume this was a calculated marketing ploy."

The magazine Veja delivered a scathing assessment: "Though it manages two or three genuinely funny moments, the film relies on histrionic overacting to portray three couples trapped in a derelict beach house before New Year's. From the catty female rivalries to the cringe-inducing machismo, the script traffics in downright embarrassing jokes..."

=== Accolades ===
Year	Award	Category	Recipient(s)	Result	Ref.
2019	Grande Prêmio do Cinema Brasileiro	Best Comedy Feature	Os Farofeiros	Nominated	
