= Bellini and the Sphinx =

2001 film by Roberto Santucci

- Theatrical release poster
- Directed by: Roberto Santucci
- Written by: Alexandre Plosk
- Based on: Bellini e a Esfinge by Tony Bellotto
- Produced by: Theodoro Fontes; Tony Bellotto
- Starring: Fabio Assunção; Malu Mader; Maristane Dresch
- Cinematography: Jacob Solitrenick
- Edited by: Roberto Santucci
- Music by: Andreas Kisser; Charles Galvin; Eduardo Queiróz; Tony Belloto
- Production companies: Afrodísia Filmes; Banco Rural
- Distributed by: Copacabana Filmes
- Release dates: 2001 (Festival do Rio); March 1, 2002 (theatrical release)
- Running time: 120 minutes
- Country: Brazil
- Language: Portuguese
- Budget: R$1.7–1.9 million
- Box office: R$300,000

Bellini and the Sphinx (Portuguese: Bellini e a Esfinge) is 2001 Brazilian crime film directed by Roberto Santucci. Based on Tony Bellotto's homonymous novel, it stars Fabio Assunção as Remo Bellini, a São Paulo-based detective who investigates mysterious murders. It premiered at the 2001 Festival do Rio, where it won the award of Best Film.

It was followed by Bellini and the Devil, also starring Assunção, and directed by Marcelo Galvão.

== Cast ==
- Fábio Assunção as Remo Bellini
- Malu Mader as Fátima
- Maristane Dresch as Beatriz
- Eliana Guttman as Dora Lobo
- Paulo Hesse as dr. Rachid Rafidjian
- Marcos Damigo as Samuel Rafidjian
- Rosaly Papadopol as Sofia Rafidjian
- Cláudio Gabriel as Stone

== Production ==
Producer Theodoro Fontes approached director Roberto Santucci to direct Bellini and the Sphinx after seeing Olé! - Um Movie Cabra da Peste, Santucci's first feature film as director. The film's score was composed by a team that included Tony Bellotto and Charles Gavin, members of the Brazilian rock band Titãs. Andreas Kisser, guitarist of the heavy metal band Sepultura, also contributed to the score.
