= Escolinha =

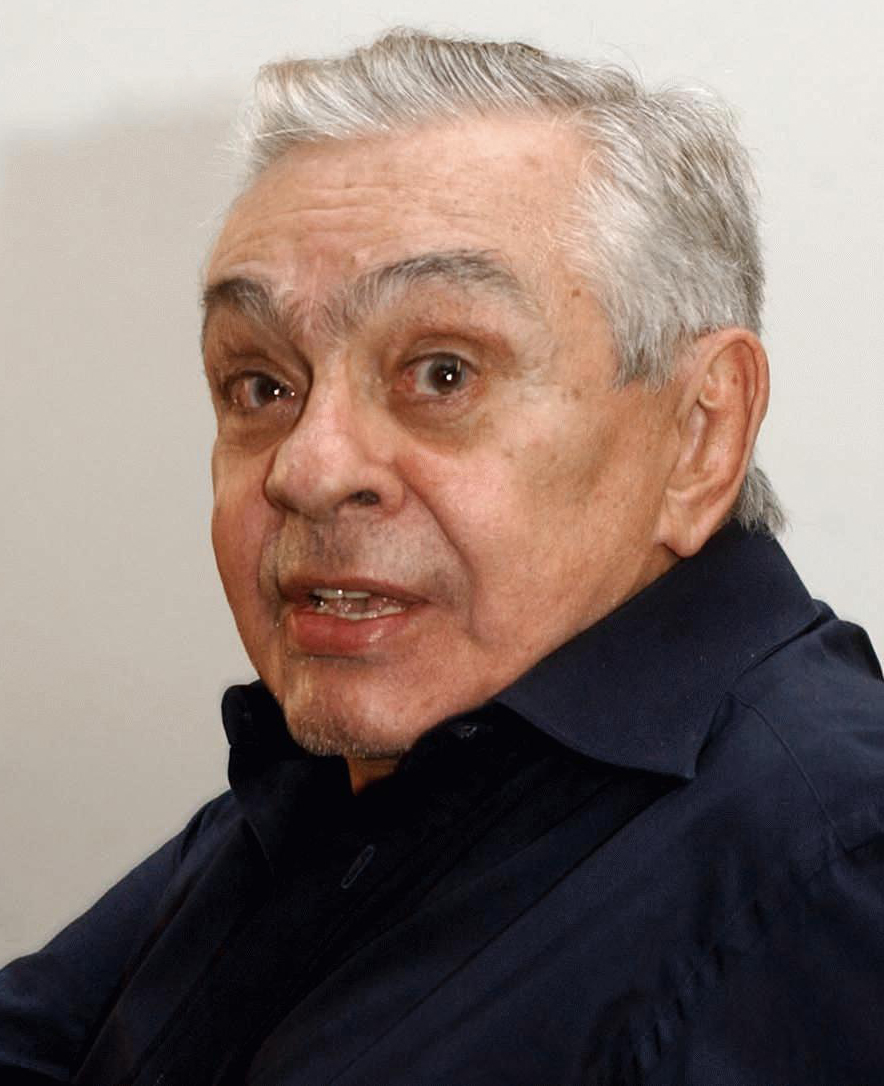
Chico Anysio gave new life to the genre with his Escolinha do Professor Raimundo.

Escolinha (Portuguese: [es.kɔˈlĩ.ɲɐ], little school) is a popular comedy genre in Brazilian media. It usually consists of a fictional classroom where an ensemble cast of adult actors play different overly stereotypical comic characters and attempt to answer questions asked by their teacher, a straight man stock character.

The earliest program that followed this setup was the 1935 radio show Escolinha da Dona Olinda on Rádio Record. It also proved to be very successful as a television format, with shows such as Escolinha do Professor Raimundo and A Escolinha do Golias.

Similar concepts are also found in some episodes of the Mexican sitcom El Chavo del Ocho, and in the Turkish film series Hababam Sınıfı.

== See also ==
- A Praça é Nossa
- Character comedy
- Radio comedy
