= Odeio o Dia dos Namorados =

2013 film directed by Roberto Santucci

- Directed by: Roberto Santucci
- Written by: Paulo Cursino
- Produced by: Mayra Lucas; Paulo Boccato
- Starring: Heloísa Périssé; Daniel Boaventura; Danielle Winits
- Edited by: Leonardo Clark
- Production companies: Glaz Entretenimento; Miravista
- Distributed by: Buena Vista International
- Release date: 7 June 2013
- Country: Brazil
- Language: Portuguese

Odeio o Dia dos Namorados (English: I Hate Valentine's Day) is a Brazilian romantic comedy film, directed by Roberto Santucci, written by Paulo Cursino and starring Heloísa Périssé, Daniel Boaventura and Danielle Winits. The film was released on June 7, 2013.

== Plot ==
Deborah was dumped by Heitor humiliatingly after certain disagreements. Soon after she puts priority to his work in advertising, where one week next "Dia dos Namorados" comes a job offer after accepting she discovers her client is Heitor. In this situation, she still has to deal with the unexpected visit of the ghost of a friend Gilberto, who tries to get her to rethink life and discover what people really think of her.

== Cast ==
The cast was as follows:

- Heloísa Périssé as Débora Ferrão
- Daniel Boaventura as Heitor
- Danielle Winits as Marina
- Marcelo Saback as Gilberto
- MV Bill as Tonhão
- Fernando Caruso as Fred
- Daniele Valente as Carol Werneck
- André Mattos as Marcos
- Charles Paraventi as Helder
- Marcela Barrozo as Young Débora.
