= Julia Dalavia =

Brazilian actress

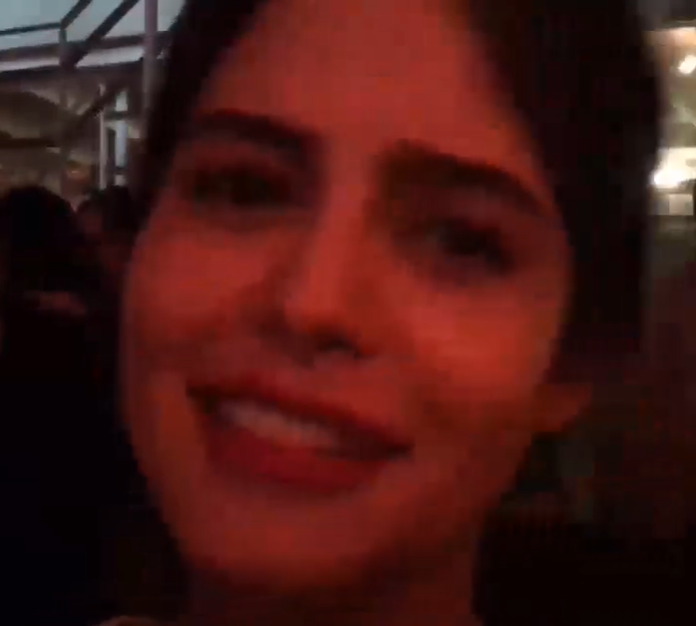
- Born: 9 February 1998 (age 27); Rio de Janeiro, Brazil
- Occupation: Actress
- Years active: 2006–present

Julia Dalavia (Brazilian Portuguese: [ˈʒuliɐ dalaˈviɐ]; born 9 February 1998) is a Brazilian actress.

== Early life ==
Dalavia was born in Tijuca, Rio de Janeiro on February 9, 1998, daughter of Márcia Dalavia. She studied at O Tablado and took Video and Film courses with Cybele Santa Cruz, and Theatre at Humaita Culture House, with Daniela Pessoa and supervision of Pedro Vasconcelos.

== Career ==
She debuted in the theater in 2006, in the play A Fuga das Galinhas. In the same year, made her first film, O Cavaleiro Didi e a Princesa Lili, of Marcus Figueiredo. On television, she made her first role in Xuxa e as Noviças of Rede Globo in 2008. In 2012, debuted in national cinemas interpreting Stephane, the Tété in Até que a Sorte nos Separe. However, she became known in 2014 when interpreting Helena, character in the first phase of the novel Em Família of Manoel Carlos. In 2014, she participated in the cast of the soap opera Boogie Oogie.

== Filmography ==
=== Television ===
Year	Title	Role	Notes
2013	As Canalhas	Young Tereza/Irmã Angélica	Episode: "Angélica"
2013	Meu Passado Me Condena	Beatriz "Bia" Costa	Episode: "O Ex-Namorado que Gostava de Criança"
2014	Em Família	Helena "Leninha" Fernandes Machado	First phase
2014	Boogie Oogie	Alessandra Dias dos Santos (Alê)	
2016	Velho Chico	Maria Tereza de Sá Ribeiro (Terê)	First phase
2016	Justiça	Mayara Libéria do Nascimento / Suzy	
2017	Os Dias Eram Assim	Fernanda "Nanda" Sampaio	
2017–2018	O Outro Lado do Paraíso	Adriana Mello de Montserrat	
2019	Órfãos da Terra	Laila Faiek	
2022	Pantanal	Maria "Guta" Augusta	
2025	Reencarne	Verônica	
2025	Dias Perfeitos	Clarice	

=== Film ===
Year	Title	Role
2006	O Cavaleiro Didi e a Princesa Lili	Rovena
2012	Até que a Sorte nos Separe	Stefani Peixoto (Teté)
2013	Até que a Sorte nos Separe 2	Stefani Peixoto (Teté)
2015	Até que a Sorte nos Separe 3: A Falência Final	Stefani Peixoto (Teté)
2022	Minha Família Perfeita	Debora
2022	O Pastor e o Guerrilheiro	Juliana
