= A Escolinha do Golias =

- Country of origin: Brazil
- No. of seasons: 3

Production
- Running time: 30 minutes

Original release
- Network: SBT
- Release: July 11, 1990 – 1997

A Escolinha do Golias (Portuguese: Golias' Little School) was a Brazilian escolinha comedy television program broadcast by SBT between 1990 and 1997. It was rerun in 2007 and in 2018.

== Main cast ==
Actor	Character	Season			
Actor	Character	1 1990	2 1991	3 1995	4 1996
Ronald Golias	Pacífico				
Carlos Alberto de Nóbrega	Prof. Cagliostro				
Nair Bello	Pazza				
Marta Pessoa	Paçoca				
Consuelo Leandro	Severina				
Patrícia Opik	Alemanha				
