= How Angels Are Born =

1996 film directed by Murilo Salles

- Theatrical release poster
- Directed by: Murilo Salles
- Written by: Murilo Salles; Jorge Duran; Aguinaldo Silva; Nelson Nadotti
- Produced by: Cláudio Kahns; Rômulo Marinho Jr. Murilo Salles
- Starring: Larry Pine; Priscila Assum; Silvio Guindane; André Mattos
- Cinematography: César Charlone
- Edited by: Isabelle Rathery; Vicente Kubrusly
- Music by: Victor Biglione
- Production company: Empório de Cinema
- Distributed by: RioFilme
- Release dates: August 16, 1996 (Festival de Gramado); 1996 (theatrical release) (Note: An exactly date cannot be assumed, but the earliest report found about How Angels Are Born in theaters dates November 26, 1996.)
- Running time: 97 minutes
- Country: Brazil
- Language: Portuguese
- Box office: R$200,000

How Angels Are Born (Portuguese: Como Nascem os Anjos) is a 1996 Brazilian crime drama film directed by Murilo Salles. It stars Priscila Assum and Silvio Guindane as two Rio de Janeiro favela's children who become involved in the kidnapping of an American man played by Larry Pine. How Angels Are Born has received awards at film festivals, and has been well received by critics.

== Plot ==
Maguila, a developmentally delayed man, accidentally kills the drug lord of Favela Santa Marta, Rio de Janeiro. Pursued by other drug dealers, Maguila flees from the favela along with a 13-year-old tomboy nicknamed Branquinha who proclaims herself Maguila's wife. Amid the confusion, Branquinha takes her friend Japa into a car whose driver is forced to help Maguila. Suddenly, Maguila gets out of the car with the children. They arrive at the house of the American William, and Maguila asks to use his bathroom to relieve himself, as according to Branquinha he was well-bred by his mother and cannot bring himself to urinate outdoors. Assuming it is a robbery, William's chauffeur shoots Maguila who in response kills him.

In the house, they discover Dona Conceição, William's maid, and Julie, William's daughter, both trying to call the police, but Japa prevents them from doing it. Maguila and the children do not want to stay there, but Maguila wants first aid to be performed on his wound before leaving. Julie attempts to bandage him up, but when the fugitive trio are about to leave the house, Japa notices a police car nearby. Japa recommends that they to wait until it goes away, and Branquinha and Japa tie up the residents. While Maguila is exhausted due to his injury, Japa explores the house and Branquinha becomes fascinated by Julie, forcing her to take off her shirt so she can admire her breasts. The police car eventually disappears, but Maguila decides to rest. In this time, Marta, William's secretary, finds it odd that no one answers the doorbell, and calls the police.

Trapped inside the house, the children and William try to negotiate with the police to leave the place. They request the presence of an American ambassador, a children's rights non-governmental organization, and the press to assure their security. To show off to the police, Branquinha asks Julie to wear fancy clothes to give the appearance that she is safe. While the children are on the second floor choosing Julie's clothes for her appearance on television, Conceição manages to escape from the ties that held her. Japa instructs her to stop trying to release William from his ties and attempting to escape, which she refuses, leading Japa to accidentally kill her. After this, Japa and Branquinha argue about the best way to escape, and accidentally kill each other. The police then invade the home and rescue William and Julie.

== Cast ==
- Larry Pine as William
- Priscila Assum as Branquinha
- Silvio Guindane as Japa
- Ryan Massey as Julie
- André Mattos as Maguila
- Maria Sílvia as Dona Conceição
- Antonio Grassi as police chief
- Graziela de Laurentis
- Vicente Barcelos
- Clemente Viscaíno
- Maria Adélia as Marta
- Ricardo Sampaio

== Reception ==
At the 24th Gramado Film Festival, How Angels Are Born won five awards: Best Director, Critic's Award, Special Jury Award (Assum and Guindane), Best Cinematography (tied with Quem Matou Pixote?), and Best Editing. Sílvia won the Best Supporting Actress Award at the 29th Brasília Film Festival, while it was awarded the Best Film at the 23rd Festival de Cine Iberoamericano de Huelva.

Luiz Zannin Oricchio, writing for O Estado de S. Paulo, called it "one of the best films of the so-called renaissance of Brazilian cinema". The author of the book Splendors of Latin Cinema, Hernandez Rodriguez, declared it is "far from the visual rush, the intensity, and the perfection of style, as well as the visual of pyrotechnics of Cidade de Deus", and said it is "definitely more interesting than Cidade dos Homens". The way children are represented in How Angels Are Born was commented by Italian Neorealism and Global Cinema's writers Laura E. Ruberto and Kristi M. Wilson, who compared it to Italian neorealism films. Variety's critic Ken Eisner praised Assum's performances, stating Branquinha was "played memorably" by her, as well as its cinematography, which helps "to offset plot claustrophobia". Eisner commented that "an apocalyptic ending provides a downbeat jolt to this generally smart and unpredictable drama."
