= Zilda Cardoso =

Brazilian actress (1936–2019)

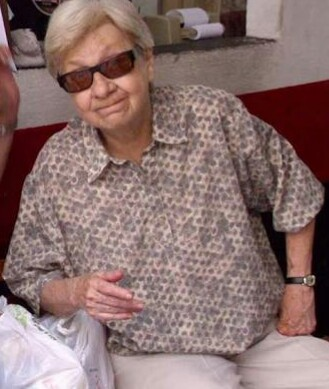
- Cardoso in 2016
- Born: January 4, 1936 (age 89); São Paulo, Brazil
- Occupation: Actress
- Years active: 1961–2000

Zilda Cardoso (4 January 1936 in São Paulo – 20 December 2019 in São Paulo) was a Brazilian actress.

She was best known for her many comedic roles in TV shows such as Praça da Alegria, A Praça é Nossa and Escolinha do Professor Raimundo.

== Filmography ==
Year	Title	Role	Notes
1964	O Lamparina	Maria	
1965	Meu Japão Brasileiro	Professora	
1969	Golias Contra o Homem das Bolinhas	Laura	
1970	Se Meu Dólar Falasse	Perua	
1990	Escolinha do Professor Raimundo	Dona Catifunda	TV series
