= Casa Amor: Exclusive for Ladies =

2015 film by Jung Bum-shik

- Theatrical poster
- Directed by: Jung Bum-shik
- Written by: Jung Bum-shik
- Based on: De Pernas pro Ar by Paulo Cursino, Marcelo Saback
- Produced by: Kim Hong-baek; Min Jin-su
- Starring: Cho Yeo-jeong; Clara
- Cinematography: Lee Seon-yeong
- Edited by: Kim Sun-min
- Music by: Sung Ki-wan
- Production companies: Soo Film; Hong Film
- Distributed by: Megabox Plus M
- Release date: January 8, 2015
- Running time: 112 minutes
- Country: South Korea
- Language: Korean
- Box office: US$1.1 million

Casa Amor: Exclusive for Ladies (Korean: 워킹걸; RR: Woking geol; lit. 'Working Girl') is a 2015 South Korean sex comedy film directed by Jung Bum-shik, starring Jo Yeo-jeong and Clara. It is adapted from the 2010 Brazilian film De Pernas pro Ar.

== Plot ==
Beautiful, workaholic Bo-hee is a successful marketing executive at the number one toy company in Korea. Respected by her colleagues and in line for a promotion, she makes an irrevocable mistake that gets her fired from her job. Bo-hee's life further spins out of control when her husband Gang-sung leaves her soon after.

Bo-hee befriends her neighbor Nan-hee, an amateur sex expert who runs a sex shop on the brink of bankruptcy called "Casa Amor." Nan-hee's predicament inspires Bo-hee's creativity, and using her background in children's toys, she is determined to save the shop by making its ambiance more refined and by promoting better sex toys.

== Cast ==
- Jo Yeo-jeong as Baek Bo-hee
- Clara as Oh Nan-hee
- Kim Tae-woo as Koo Gang-sung
- Kim Bo-yeon as Yoon Gwan-soon
- Ra Mi-ran as Eum Soon-ok
- Bae Seong-woo as Seok Soo-beom
- Kim Gi-cheon as Company president Cheon
- Kim Ha-yoo as Koo Ha-yoo
- Kim Young-ok as Chairman Yeon
- Oh Na-ra as Soo-beom's wife
- Lee Seon-hee as Housewife
- Kim Do-yeon as Head of department Jo's wife
- Go Kyung-pyo as Pyo Kyeong-soo (cameo)
- Jo Jae-yoon as Jo Ji-ho (cameo)
- Choi Seong-joon as Nan-hee's first love (cameo)
- Lee Jae-gu as Nan-hee's father (cameo)
- Julien Kang as Muscle man (cameo)
- Megu Fujiura as Reiko
