= Marcos Pitombo =

Brazilian actor

- Born: June 17, 1982 (age 44); Rio de Janeiro, Brazil
- Occupation: Actor
- Years active: 2007-present

Marcos Pitombo (born Marcos Menezes Magalhães Pitombo on June 17, 1982 in Rio de Janeiro) is a Brazilian actor.

== Filmography ==
=== TV series ===
Year	Title	Role
2007	Malhação	Siri
2008	Os Mutantes	Valente
2009	Promessas de Amor	José da Silva Valente
2010	A História de Ester	Assuero
2011	Vidas em Jogo	Lucas Coelho
2013	Pecado Mortal	Ramiro
2014	Vitória	Paulão
2015	Babilônia	Iuri
2017	Haja Coração	Felipe Miranda
2018	Orgulho e Paixão	Rômulo Tibúrcio
2020	Salve-se Quem Puder	Bruno Dantas

=== Cinema ===
Year	Title	Role
2008	Once Upon a Time in Rio	Dudu
2012	Até que a Sorte nos Separe	Tino (young)
