= Até que a Sorte nos Separe =

2012 film directed by Roberto Santucci

- Theatrical release poster
- Written by: Paulo Cursino; Angélica Lopes
- Starring: Leandro Hassum; Danielle Winits; Kiko Mascarenhas; Rita Elmôr; Ailton Graça
- Cinematography: Juarez Pavelak
- Edited by: Leo Clark
- Production companies: Globo Filmes; Gullane
- Distributed by: Paris Filmes; Downtown Filmes
- Release date: October 5, 2012
- Running time: 104 minutes
- Country: Brazil
- Language: Portuguese

Até que a Sorte nos Separe (transl. Till Luck Do Us Part) is a 2012 Brazilian comedy film directed by Roberto Santucci and starring Leandro Hassum and Danielle Winits. The film is inspired by the best selling book Casais Inteligentes Enriquecem Juntos by Gustavo Cerbasi. Its sequel, Até que a Sorte nos Separe 2, was released in Brazilian theaters on 27 December 2013. The film received generally negative reviews, with critics criticising the acting, the lack of originality and forced humor.

== Plot ==
Tino (Leandro Hassum) is a common family man who sees his life change dramatically after winning the lottery. Leading a life of ostentation with his wife, Jane (Danielle Winits), he spends all the money in 15 years. When broken, Tino accepts the help of neighbor Amauri (Kiko Mascarenhas), a bureaucratic and finance consultant who lives his own drama when facing a crisis in marriage with Laura (Rita Elmôr). Trying to avoid that Jane discovers the new financial situation, after all she is pregnant and cannot go through strong emotions, Tino engages in various confusions to pretend that everything is well. For that, he relies on the help of his best friend, Adelson (Aílton Graça), and his children.

== Cast ==
- Leandro Hassum as Tino
  - Marcos Pitombo as Young Tino
- Danielle Winits as Jane
- Julia Dalavia as Tete
- Kiko Mascarenhas as Amauri
- Rita Elmôr as Laura
- Ailton Graça as Adelson
- Rodrigo Sant'anna as Vander
- Maurício Sherman as Olavo
- Henry Fiuka as Juninho
- Victor Mayer as Bruno
- Marcelo Saback as Nelsinho
- Carlos Bonow as Rickson
