= Ronald Golias =

Brazilian comedian and actor (1929–2005)

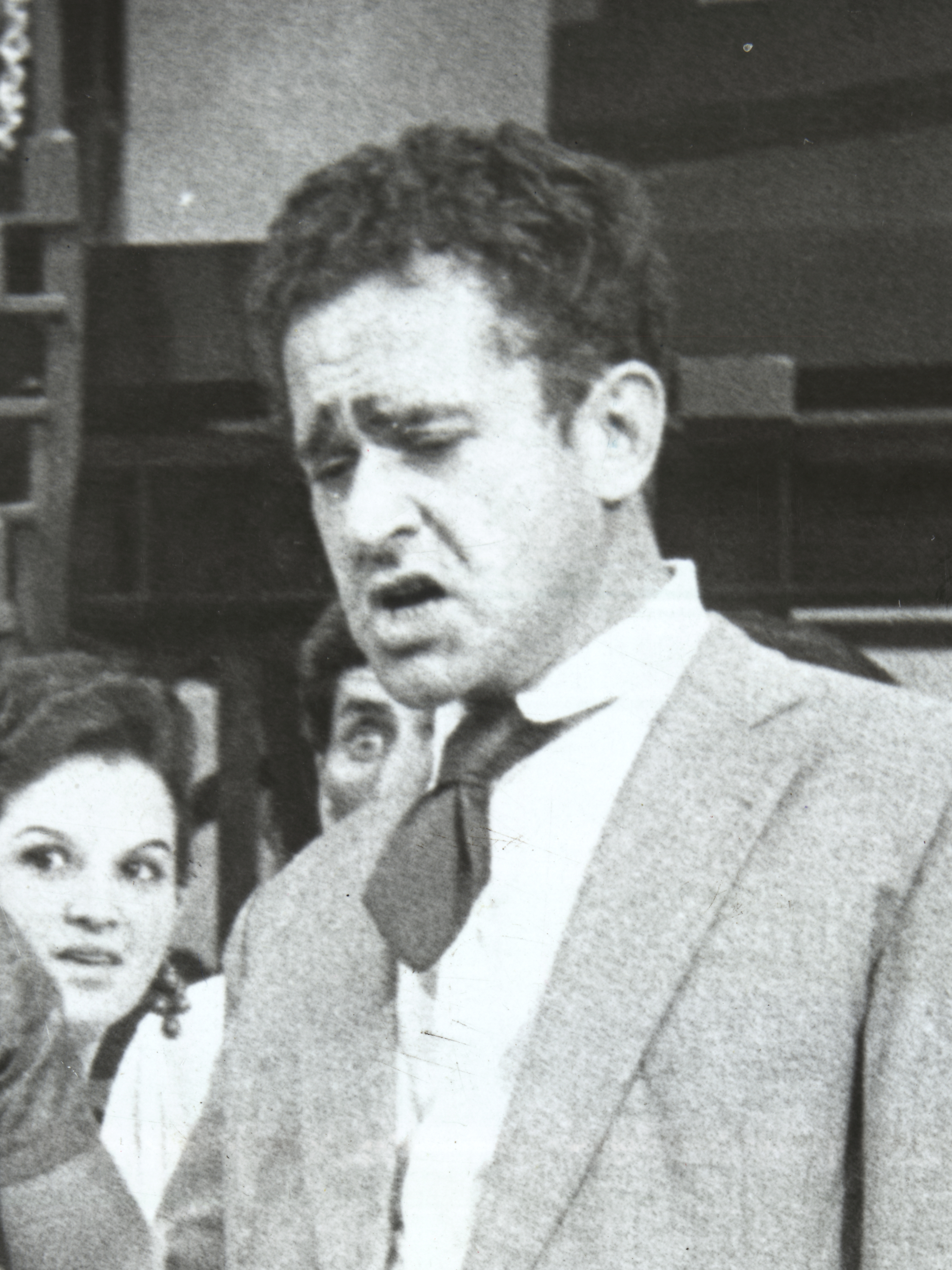
- Born: Ronald Golias; 4 May 1929; São Carlos, Brazil
- Died: 27 September 2005 (aged 76); São Paulo, Brazil
- Resting place: Cemitério do Morumbi, São Paulo, Brazil
- Notable work: Pacífico and Bronco
- Children: Paula Golias

Comedy career
- Years active: 1950–2005
- Medium: Radio; film; television
- Genres: Character comedy; physical comedy; satire
- Subjects: Naivety; Brazilians; politics

Ronald Golias (4 May 1929 – 27 September 2005) was a Brazilian comedian and actor.

== Biography ==
Golias was born in the city of São Carlos, in the state of São Paulo, Brazil, and worked as a tailor assistant and insurance agent, amongst other professions. But, during the 1950s, he impressed Manoel de Nóbrega, who hired him to work as a comedian, both on TV and on the radio.

His first character was named "Pacífico", a tongue-in-the-cheek young man, that made famous the catch phrase "Ô Cride!", Portuguese for "Hey, Cride!", being "Cride" a Brazilian nickname, or misspell for the name Euclides. A big hit, it paved the way for a cinema career, where he worked on ten movies. Back to television, he brought with himself "Bronco", his main cinema character, and became a big TV hit from 1967 to 1971 with A Família Trapo ("The Trapo Family", a reference to the von Trapp family from The Sound of Music). In this show, Bronco was the brother-in-law of an Italian short-tempered man. Bronco never held a job and lived off his brother-in-law, and he was never too intimidated to view his (often provocative) opinions. His sister was a character played by Renata Fronzi. Golias' character was the most important for the show's "rhythm" and also the funniest character.

In 1979, a short-lived Brazilian version of Mork & Mindy appeared as Superbronco. It was produced by Rede Globo and starred Ronald Golias and actress Liza Vieira. Superbronco had only one season and was canceled although it was among the ten highest TV audience rates in 1979.

Since the early 1990s, he worked in the TV show A Praça é Nossa, playing the character Pacífico, and sometimes also "The Master" (a sage who answered questions from the people using sexual innuendo jokes on them), "Isolda" (a woman who liked to talk about her personal life to Carlos Alberto de Nóbrega, the host of the show A Praça é Nossa) and "Professor Bartolomeu Guimarães". Also was starring since 2004 a TV show of his own called Meu Cunhado, along with another famed Brazilian comedian, Moacyr Franco. When Golias died, there were 22 episodes of Meu Cunhado never shown on TV, and that probably will never be aired, because his family asked SBT to stop airing his material. He was a good friend of the Brazilian comedian Renato Aragão.

Golias died in 2005 in São Paulo, from multiple organ failure, after being hospitalized with lung infection.

== Discography ==
=== 78 rpm disc ===
- Lágrimas de Amor / Chico Mulato (1956)
- Trudia / Ai que Humilhação (1957)
- Festa de Aniversário / O Gozadinho Chegou (1957)
- Copa do Mundo / Toureiro (Torero) (1958)
- A Bandolinha / Aguenta Bastiana (1958)
- Ó Crides / Mi Dimira Muito (1959)

=== LP record ===
- Bilhetinhos de Jânio (Coletânea de J. Pereira) (1960)
- "Côrte Rayol Show" (1967) – Guest appearance
- Olímpiaaaa (1967)
- Ronald Golias (1968)
- A escolinha do Golias (1968)
- Ronald Golias (1970)
- Ronald Golias (1972)
- Ronald Golias (1974)
- Humor a quatro (1979)
- As anedotas do Pasquim (1980)

== Theatrical performances ==
Year	Title	Role	Notes
1972	Circuito Fechado		It premiered at the Theatro Serrador.

== Filmography ==
=== Television ===
Year	Title	Role	Notes
1956	A Praça da Alegria	Pacífico	Broadcast by TV Paulista
1965	Quatro Homens Juntos	Carne de Pescoço and Tony Frank	Broadcast by TV Record
1965	Ceará contra 007	Bartolomeu	Broadcast by TV Record
1967	Família Trapo	Bronco	Broadcast by TV Record
1972	Bronco Total	Bronco	Broadcast by TV Record
1979	Superbronco	Bronco	Broadcast by Rede Globo
1986	Bronco	Bronco	Broadcast by Rede Bandeirantes
1990–2005	A Praça é Nossa	Pacífico, Bartolomeu Guimarães, The Master, Isolda, and Profeta	Broadcast by SBT
1991–1997	A Escolinha do Golias	Pacífico	Broadcast by SBT
2004	Meu Cunhado	Bronco	Broadcast by SBT

=== Film ===
Year	Title	Role	Notes
1957	Marido Barra Limpa	Teófilo	
1958	Vou te Contá…		
1960	Tudo Legal	Bronco	
1961	O Dono da Bola	Carlos da Silva Bronco	
1961	Os Três Cangaceiros	Carlos Bronco	
1962	Os Cosmonautas	Gagarino da Silva	
1963	O Homem que Roubou a Copa do Mundo		
1968	Repórter da Tela. n.740	Himself	Newsreel
1969	Agnaldo, Perigo à Vista!	Brazilian driver	Guest appearance
1969	Golias Contra o Homem das Bolinhas	Pacífico	
1996	Celebração	Himself	Documentary film
