= Just Short of Perfect =

- Portuguese: Amor Sem Medida
- Directed by: Ale McHaddo
- Written by: Michelle Ferreira
- Starring: Juliana Paes; Leandro Hassum; Letícia Birkheuer; Elizângela
- Production companies: Buena Vista International; Coração da Selva; Downtown Filmes
- Distributed by: Buena Vista International (Brazil); Netflix (International)
- Release date: 18 November 2021
- Running time: 94 minutes
- Country: Brazil
- Languages: Portuguese; English

Just Short of Perfect (Portuguese: Amor Sem Medida) is a 2021 Brazilian comedy film directed by Ale McHaddo, written by Michelle Ferreira and starring Letícia Birkheuer, Elizângela and Leandro Hassum. The film was released by Netflix on November 18, 2021. It is the fifth remake of the Argentinian film Lion's Heart (2013 film). Ivana Taveres, a tall and newly divorced attorney begins a romantic relationship with Ricardo Leon, a short widowed doctor.

== Plot ==
When Ivana loses her phone at a coffee shop, Ricardo finds it and calls her home phone. They decide to meet at the coffee shop the next morning, and she is surprised by how short he is. As a cardiologist, he sees that she is stressed and takes her sky-diving. He has to cut the date short when the Pope, visiting Brazil, is hospitalized and needs an emergency surgery. Ricardo asks his daughter, Manu, for advice on how to ask Ivana out, while Ivana battles her divorce with her ex-husband, Danilo.

Ivana and Ricardo have a romantic dinner date, where they share a kiss. For their next date, they go to a music club, where Ricardo performs live. In the middle of the performance, a creepy man tries to flirt with Ivana. The man makes fun of Ricardo's height and challenges Ricardo to a dance-off, in which Ricardo wins. They spend the night together at Ricardo's place, and Ivana realizes the challenges that come with being Ricardo's height.

Danilo sees Ivana with Ricardo and mocks his height, but Ivana defends him. Ivana invites Ricardo over for lunch and he has trouble reaching the utensils needed to make the meal. Ivana's mother calls her and she doesn't tell her about Ricardo. She hesitantly invites him to her brother's wedding reception party the upcoming weekend. At the party, Ivana introduces Ricardo to her family as her friend. When Ivana steps away, her mother asks Ricardo to help get Ivana and Danilo get back together.

The next day, when Ivana tells her mother that she is seeing Ricardo, she responds with prejudice towards Ricardo's height, so Ivana gets frustrated and leaves the car. Ricardo comes to Ivana's office to visit her and Danilo insults him. The two men get into a physical fight, and Danilo creates a misunderstanding between Ricardo and Ivana. Thinking Ivana is playing him because she is ashamed of him, Ricardo breaks up with her. Both Ricardo and Ivana are devastated by the break-up. Manu tells Ricardo to accept himself first before expecting Ivana to accept him.

At her brother's wedding, Ivana realizes how Danilo and her mother created the misunderstanding between her and Ricardo. She tells them both off, and her father starts to speak up in support of her when he experiences apparent heart problems. They rush him to Ricardo's hospital while Ricardo shows up to the wedding venue. When Ricardo arrives to treat him, everyone is relieved that he is just suffering from severe gas. Ivana's brother's wedding continues at the hospital. She and Ricardo both give a speech and kiss each other.

== Cast ==
- Juliana Paes as Ivana Taveres
- Leandro Hassum as Ricardo Leon
- Marcelo Laham as Danilo Taveres
- Luana Martau as Corina
- Pietra Hassum as Manuela Leão
- Letícia Birkheuer as Dr. Cláudia
- Elizângela as Márcia Alvarenga
- Casey Frost as Fred
- Johnny Klein as Nurse Fran
- Marcelo Mansfield as Adolfo Alvarenga
- Eduardo Montenegro as Jacob
- Delurdes Moraes as Odete
- Rogerio Morgado
- Eduardo Mossri as Wladimir Alvarenga
- Mário José Paz as Pope Francisco
- Teca Pereira as Nurse Joyce
- Carol Portes as Ceremonialist
- Rafael Portugal as Raul
