= Orlando Drummond =

Brazilian actor (1919–2021)

- Born: Orlando Drummond Cardoso; 18 October 1919; Rio de Janeiro, Brazil
- Died: 27 July 2021 (aged 101); Rio de Janeiro, Brazil
- Occupations: Actor; comedian
- Years active: 1942–2021
- Spouse: Glória Drummond (m. 1951) (her death in 2022)
- Children: 2

Orlando Drummond Cardoso (18 October 1919 – 27 July 2021) was a Brazilian actor and comedian, best known for his works as "Senhor Peru" (literally "Mr. Turkey") in the sitcom Escolinha do Professor Raimundo and also as the voice of the dubbed versions of Scooby-Doo, ALF, and Popeye.

== Life and career ==
Drummond was born in Rio de Janeiro on 18 October 1919. He began working in 1942 as a foley artist and, with help from Paulo Gracindo, started his dubbing career. He also worked as an actor in the films Rei do Movimento (1954) and Angu de Caroço (1955), but he is primarily known for his dubbing works during the 1950s. He acted also in the telenovela Caça Talentos as Zarathustra from 1996 to 1998.

He died on 27 July 2021 from multiple organ failure, at the age of 101. He had also been hospitalised for a urinary tract infection three months before his death. Perhaps as an incredible coincidence, his long-standing friend Mário Monjardim Filho (who voiced Shaggy Rogers, Scooby-Doo's best friend) died only 3 days after Drummond's passing.

== Voice acting ==
- Scooby-Doo in all the series from 1969 to 2010.
- Popeye in all the series of the Company Herbert Richers.
- Alf (series and cartoons)
- Gargamel — The Smurfs in the Hanna-Barbera 1980s show / Papa Smurf — The Smurfs (2011)
- Owl (Winnie-the-Pooh)
- Bionicão : O Show do Bionicão - Dynomutt, Dog Wonder
- Commissioner James Gordon (Pat Hingle) - Batman (second dubbing), Batman Returns, Batman Forever, Batman & Robin (second dubbing)
- Dr. Kawa (Kawashimo Sensei) – Jetta Marusu / Jetter Mars
- Tanaka – Rokumon Tengai Mon Colle Knight
- Professor Tournesol – The Adventures of Tintin
- Sneezy – Snow White and the Seven Dwarfs
- Lebre de Março — Alice in Wonderland (first dubbing)
- Donald Hayes (Takashi Hayase) – Super Dimensional Fortress Macross
- Warera – Super Dimensional Fortress Macross
- Sr. Smee — Peter Pan
- Gennai – Digimon Adventure
- Gennai Older – Digimon Adventure 02
- Grim – The Grim Adventures of Billy & Mandy
- Galactor – Science Ninja Team Gatchaman Kagaku Ninjatai Gatchaman
- Marshall Dogus – Groizer X
- Archimede — The Sword in the Stone
- Sr. Dawes Sênior — Mary Poppins (first dubbing)
- Little John — Robin Hood
- Lafayette — The Aristocats
- Pepe Legal - (Quick Draw McGraw)
- Pops Racer – (first dubbing) Mach GoGoGo
- Patolino (Daffy Duck) and Frajola (Sylvester the Cat) — Looney Tunes and Uma cilada para Roger Rabbit (Who Framed Roger Rabbit)
- Thing — Fantastic Four
- Trailbreaker – (second dubbing) – Transformers: Generation 1
- Yar – Dinosaur
- Yukk – Mighty Man and Yukk
- Oliver Hardy — Laurel and Hardy
- General Patton — Patton
- Unicron – Transformers the Movie (VHS dubbing)
- Jack Marshak (Chris Wiggins) — Friday the 13th: The Series
- Venger - Dungeons & Dragons (TV series)
- Sabretooth - X-Men: The Animated Series
