= Jesus (TV series) =

- Promotional poster
- Genre: Telenovela; Drama; Epic
- Created by: Paula Richard
- Written by: Joaquim de Assis; Larissa de Oliveira; Méuri Luiza; Natália Piserni; Natália Sambrini; Rodrigo Ribeiro
- Directed by: Edgard Miranda
- Starring: Dudu Azevedo
- Opening theme: "Precioso" by Marcello Brayner
- Country of origin: Brazil
- Original language: Portuguese
- No. of seasons: 1
- No. of episodes: 193

Production
- Camera setup: Multi-camera
- Production companies: RecordTV; Casablanca

Original release
- Network: RecordTV
- Release: 24 July 2018 – 22 April 2019

Jesus is a Brazilian telenovela produced by Casablanca and RecordTV. The telenovela is created by Paula Richard and directed by Edgard Miranda. It premiered on 24 July 2018 and ended on 22 April 2019. It stars Dudu Azevedo as the titular character. Filming of the telenovela began in June 2018.

It is the fifth biblical telenovela by Record TV and it is based on the life and ministry of Jesus, the central figure of Christianity.

== Plot ==
After receiving the miraculous announcement that she, of all women, will soon bear the Son of God, young woman from Bethlehem named Maria gives birth to the prophesied Messiah and, together with her husband José, tries to raise Jesus with values and good principles. The prophecy of the Messiah troubles mad king Herod, who goes on to persecute the family in an attempt to kill the child, believing that it will secure his own rule of Judea, forcing Maria and José to raise Jesus as an ordinary young man, far from his mission.

Over the years, however, Jesus begins to understand his role in the world and travels through the towns of Judea, now under Roman rule, carrying the teachings of peace and equality together with his twelve apostles: Pedro, André, Tiago Maior, João, Filipe, Natanael, Tomé, Mateus, Tiago Menor, Judas Tadeu, and Simão Zelote, besides the envious and susceptible Judas Iscariote, who will eventually betray him. They are also joined by several female followers, including Jesus' mother Maria, her sister Sula, her childhood friend Mirian, and ultimately the greatest devotee of the Messiah, Maria Madalena, a Jewish Hellenist widow who suffered from demonic possession for years. She believed she was saved in the arms of the Roman centurion Petronius, but she found true liberation in Jesus and become his most steadfast disciple.

== Cast ==
- Dudu Azevedo as Jesus
  - Matheus Dantas as Child Jesus
  - Nícolas Sanches as Young Jesus
- Dayenne Mesquita as Maria Madalena
- Mayana Moura as Satanás
- Vanessa Gerbelli as Herodíade
- Marcos Winter as Herodes Antipas
  - Miguel Roncato as Young Herodes Antipas
- Guilherme Winter as Judas Iscariotes
- Petrônio Gontijo as Pedro da Galileia
- André Gonçalves as Barrabás
  - Luiz Eduardo Oliveira as Child Barrabás
- Fernando Pavão as Petronius
  - Victor Sparapane as Young Petronius
- Cláudia Mauro as Maria de Nazaré
  - Juliana Xavier as Young Maria
- Beth Goulart as Mirian de Alfeu
  - Victoria Pozzan as Young Mirian
- Adriana Garambone as Adela Rakh
- Nicola Siri as Pôncio Pilatos
- Larissa Maciel as Cláudia Prócula de Pilatos
- Gabriel Gracindo as Mateus Evangelista
- Ricky Tavares as Judas Tadeu
- Rafael Gevú as João Zebedeu
- César Cardadeiro as Thiago Maior
- José Victor Pires as Thiago Menor
- Rodrigo Andrade as Simão Zelote
  - DJ Amorim as Child Simão Zelote
- Pierre Baitelli as Natanael Bartolomeu
- Maurício Ribeiro as André da Galileia
- Gustavo Rodrigues as Tomé Dídimo
- Matheus Fagundes as Filipe de Betsaida
- Bárbara Borges as Livona Rakh
- Eucir de Souza as Caifás
  - Ronny Kriwat as Young Caifás
- Marcela Muniz as Judite de Caifás
- Giuseppe Oristanio as José de Arimatéia
- Ana Paula Tabalipa as Asisa Bah
  - Camila Mayrink as Young Asisa
- Manuela do Monte as Laila Bah
- Rafael Sardão as Simão Fariseu
- Felipe Cunha as Jairo
- Letícia Medina as Yoná de Nazaré
- Júlia Maggessi as Helena de Pilatos
- Maitê Padilha as Gabriela da Galileia
- Iano Salomão as João Batista de Jerusalém
- Raphael Montagner as Hélio
- Ana Lima as Joana de Chuza
- Tadeu Aguiar as Chuza
- Paulo Figueiredo as Anás ben Sete
- Ernani Moraes as Nicodemos
  - Vitor Novello as Young Nicomedos
- Kika Kalache as Sula de Nazaré Zebedeu
  - Isadora Cecatto as Young Sula de Nazaré Zebedeu
- Sacha Bali as Longinus
- Felipe Roque as Caius
- Gil Coelho as Tiago Justo de Nazaré
  - Leandro Silva as Child Thiago Justo de Nazaré
- Manuela Llerena as Deborah de Arimatéia
- Valentina Bulc as Salomé Agripa
- Hall Mendes as Abel de Chuza
- Felipe Cardoso as Ami de Betesda
- Jéssika Alves as Maria de Betânia
- Dani Moreno as Marta de Betânia
- Barbara Reis as Susana
- Paulo Lessa as Goy
- Vandré Silveira as Lázaro de Betânia
- Rafael Awi as Judá de Nazaré
- Lara Lazzaretti as Eliseba de Nazaré
- André Rosa as Simas de Nazaré
- Marcel Giubilei as José Filho de Nazaré
- Fifo Benicasa as Dimas Rakh
- Flávio Pardal as Gestas Rakh
- Polliana Aleixo as Kesiah
- Guilherme Lopes as Efraim Bah
- Adriano Alves as Nemestrino
- Zeca Richa as Almáquio
- Cacá Ottoni as Diana Rakh
- Claudia Assumpção as Cassandra
  - Juliana Boller as Young Cassandra
- Daniel Villas as Malco de Betesda
- Ana Barroso as Sara
- Hilton Castro as Zaqueu
- Ademir Emboava as Cornélius
- Luka Ribeiro as Shabaka
- Luiz Nicolau as Heitor
- Juliana Kaz as Bina
- Dani Bavoso as Rebeca
- Naiumi Goldoni as Liba
- Thales Coutinho as Abner
- Tiago Marques as Dylan
- Giuliano Laffayette as Aarão

=== Guest stars ===
- Michel Bercovitch as José de Nazaré
  - Guilherme Dellorto as Young José
- Paulo Gorgulho as Herodes, o Grande
- Raphael Sander as Anjo Gabriel
- Allan Souza Lima as Judas Galileu
- Maurício Mattar as Joaquim de Nazaré
- Talita Castro as Ana de Nazaré
- Bemvindo Sequeira as Zacarias de Jerusalém
- Cláudia Mello as Isabel de Jerusalém
- Dedina Bernardelli as Edissa de Arimatéia
- César Pezzuoli as Saul
- Roney Villela as Zebedeu
- Paulo César Pereio as Simeão
- Camilla Amado as Hanna
- Sthefany Brito as Dana
- Angelina Muniz as Yarin
- Adriana Birolli as Cívia de Yafo
- Pedro Lamin as Isaque de Yafo
- Marcelo Batista as Simão de Cirene
- Edson Fieschi as Tribuno
- Daniel Blanco as Alfeu
- João Fenerich as Abiel de Betânia
- Cássio Pandolph as Melchior
- Cridemar Aquino as Baltasar
- Tatsu Carvalho as Gaspar
- Sidney Guedes as Samaritano
- Bernardo Dugin as Youssef
- Raíssa Venâncio as Adela de Betânia
- Saulo Rodrigues as Caleb
- Myrella Victoria as Talita
- Nanda Andrade as Adira
- Kátia Moraes as Elza
- Rodrigo Vidigal as Quemuel
- Gabriela Rosas as Zilla
- Rodrigo Soni as Adão
- Thalita Xavier as Eva
- Zeca Carvalho as Comandante de Herodes
- Marcos Holanda as Servo de Herodes

== Ratings ==
Season	Timeslot (BRT/AMT)	Episodes	First aired		Last aired	
Season	Timeslot (BRT/AMT)	Episodes	Date	Viewers (in points)	Date	Viewers (in points)
1	Mon–Fri 8:45pm	193	24 July 2018	13	22 April 2019	11
