= André Mattos =

Brazilian actor (born 1961)

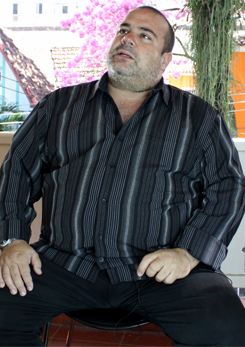
- Mattos in 2010
- Born: André de Mello Tavares de Mattos; 8 October 1961 (age 64); Rio de Janeiro, Brazil
- Occupation: Actor
- Years active: 1984–present
- Spouses: Heloísa Périssé (m. 1988; div. 1991) Roberta Repetto (m. 1992; div. 2013)
- Children: 2

André de Mello Tavares de Mattos (born 8 October 1961) is a Brazilian actor. Most known for his roles as Fininho on the sitcom Escolinha do Professor Raimundo, John VI of Portugal on the minisseries O Quinto dos Infernos, and Madruga on the telenovela Senhora do Destino. In cinema, his most known role is Fortunato in Elite Squad: The Enemy Within, for which he won Grande Prêmio do Cinema Brasileiro for Best Supporting Actor.

He was born to Emílio and Zélia de Mattos, two theatre actors and one of the founders of Teatro O Tablado. André has already acted on over one hundred of plays as of 2010. He was married to Heloísa Périssé between 1988 and 1991, and was married to Roberta Repetto, with whom he has two daughters, from 1992 to 2013.

== Selected filmography ==
=== Film ===
Year	Title	Role	Notes
1996	How Angels Are Born	Maguila	
2003	Lisbela e o Prisioneiro	Terente Guedes	
2005	Robots	Fender Pinwheeler	Brazilian dub
2010	Elite Squad: The Enemy Within	Fortunato	
2013	Odeio o Dia dos Namorados	Marcos	
2023	Elemental	Bernie Lumen	Brazilian Dub

=== Television ===
Year	Title	Role	Notes
2002	O Quinto dos Infernos	John VI of Portugal	
2003	Kubanacan	Agustin Tavalera	
2004	Senhora do Destino	Vanderlei Madruga (Madruga)	
2008	Caminhos do Coração	Paulo Pachola (Pachola)	
2008	Os Mutantes: Caminhos do Coração	Paulo Pachola (Pachola)	
2012	Balacobaco	Antônio Osório	
2015	Narcos	Jorge Ochoa	Season 1
2017	Belaventura	Falstaff	
2018	Além da Ilha	Theodoro	
2023	A Infância de Romeu e Julieta	Fausto Guerra	
2025	Três Graças	Delegado Jairo Barroso	
