= Heloísa Périssé =

Brazilian actress and writer (born 1966)

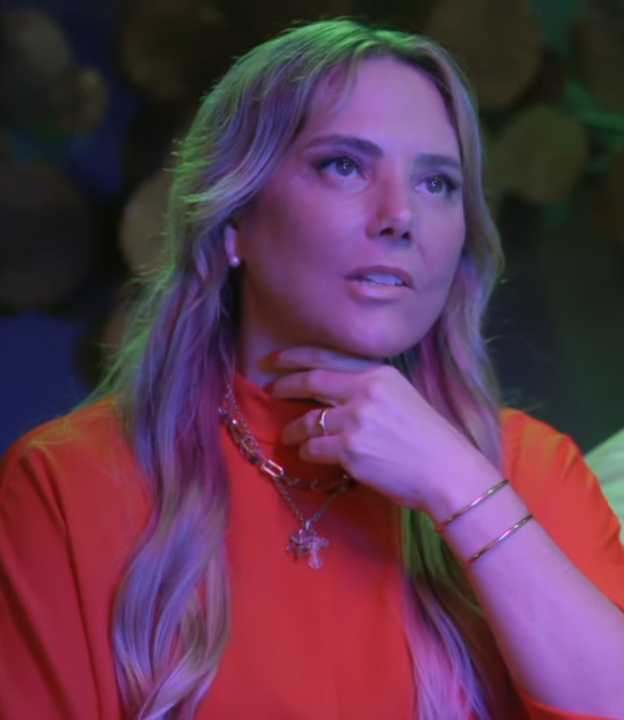
- Périssé in 2023
- Born: Heloísa Perlingeiro Périssé; 9 August 1966 (age 59); Rio de Janeiro, Brazil
- Occupations: Actress; writer
- Years active: 1988–present
- Spouses: André Mattos (m. 1988; div. 1991) Lug de Paula (m. 1992; div. 2001) Mauro Farias (m. 2002)
- Children: 2

Heloísa Perlingeiro Périssé (born 9 August 1966) is a Brazilian actress and writer.

== Biography ==
Périssé was born in Rio de Janeiro and has appeared in Brazilian television shows and films. She has also written for the TV show Sai de Baixo.

Périssé has also written books including, Mãe, Você Não Tá Entendendo and O Diário de Tati.

She has been a daughter-in-law of Chico Anysio. She divorced Lug de Paula, Chico Anysio's son, after a seven-year marriage.

She has two daughters: Antônia and Luiza.

== Filmography ==
=== Television ===
Year	Title	Role	Notes
1993	De Corpo e Alma	Woman buying sandals	Extra
1994	Incidente em Antares	Marfissa	
1994–1995	Escolinha do Professor Raimundo	Tati / Soledade	
1995	Você Decide	Cíntia	
1996	Chico Total	Various roles	
1999	Zorra Total	Malu	
2000	Brava Gente	Dirce	
2000	Os Normais	Kátia	
2002	Fantástico	Tati	
2003–2007	Sob Nova Direção	Belinha	
2008	Fantástico	Lolô	
2009–2010	Cama de Gato	Taís Helena Amâncio Prazeres Tibiriçá	
2010	Os Caras de Pau	Tati	
2010	O Relógio da Aventura	Regina / Lívia	
2011	Cordel Encantado	Neuza	
2012	Dercy de Verdade	Young Dercy Gonçalves	
2012	Avenida Brasil	Monalisa Barbosa	
2013	Junto & Misturado	Heloísa	
2014	Segunda Dama	Marali/Analu	
2014–2015	Boogie Oogie	Beatriz Miranda Romão	
2016	A Lei do Amor	Mileide Rocha	
2017	Novo Mundo	Cosette Villeneuve	
2022	The Masked Singer Brasil	Coxinha	Season 2
2023	Dança dos Famosos	Contestant	Season 20
2025–2026	Êta Mundo Melhor!	Zulma Dias	

=== Film ===
Year	Title	Role	Notes
2002	Avassaladoras	Receptionist Honeymoon	
2002	Lara	Cinira	
2003	Lisbela e o Prisioneiro	Prazeres	
2003	Xuxa Abracadabra	Patrícia	
2004	Sexo, Amor e Traição	Cláudia	
2005	Madagascar	Gloria	Brazilian voice dubbing
2007	Tati, o Filme	Tati	
2007	Os Porralokinhas	Escarlete	
2008	Madagascar: Escape 2 Africa	Gloria	Brazilian voice dubbing
2010	Muita Calma Nessa Hora	Esoteric woman	
2012	Madagascar 3: Europe's Most Wanted	Gloria	Brazilian voice dubbing
2012	O Diário de Tati	Tati	
2013	Odeio o Dia dos Namorados	Débora Ferrão	
2014	Muita Calma Nessa Hora 2	Esotérica	
2024	Noah's Ark	Ferret	Original voice
