= De Pernas pro Ar =

2010 film by Roberto Santucci

- Directed by: Roberto Santucci
- Written by: Paulo Cursino; Marcelo Saback
- Produced by: Mariza Leão
- Starring: Ingrid Guimarães; Maria Paula; Bruno Garcia; Denise Weinberg; Antonio Pedro; Cristina Pereira
- Edited by: Marcelo Moraes
- Music by: Fabio Mondego
- Production companies: Morena Films; Globo Filmes
- Distributed by: Downtown Filmes; Paris Filmes
- Release date: December 31, 2010
- Running time: 97 minutes
- Country: Brazil
- Language: Portuguese
- Budget: R$ 5 million
- Box office: R$ 31,5 million

De Pernas pro Ar (transl. Legs In The Air) is a 2010 Brazilian comedy film directed by Roberto Santucci.

The film had its premiere on December 25, 2010, with official debut on December 31, 2010. Its sequel, De Pernas pro Ar 2, debuted in Brazilian theaters on 28 December 2012. It was remade in 2015 as the South Korean film Casa Amor: Exclusive for Ladies, directed by Jung Bum-shik.

== Plot ==
Alice is a successful executive in her 30s, married to João, with whom she has a son. She is a workaholic who tries to balance between work and family routine, but loses her job and husband on the same day. She attempts to start a new life with the help of her neighbor Marcela, who tries to show that it's possible to be successful at business without forgoing the pleasures of life. Alice and Marcela become investors in a bankrupt sex shop, while Marcela helps Alice to discover the pleasures of sex toys.

== Cast ==
- Ingrid Guimarães as Alice Segretto
- Maria Paula as Marcela
- Bruno Garcia as João Luiz Segretto
- Denise Weinberg as Marion
- Antonio Pedro as Sorriso
- Cristina Pereira as Rosa
- Charles Paraventi as Raul
- João Fernandes as Paulinho
- Flávia Alessandra as Danielle Santucci
