= Teatro O Tablado =

Teatro O Tablado is a theatre in Rio de Janeiro, established in 1951 by Maria Clara Machado. Actors who have appeared here include Drica Moraes, Malu Mader, Ernesto Piccolo, Andréa Beltrão, Catarina Abdala, Louise Cardoso, Miguel Falabella, Luiz Carlos Tourinho, Felipe Camargo, Nizo Neto, Anna Cotrim, Jandir Ferrari, Marcello Novaes, Leonardo Brício, Sergio Kato, Luisa Thiré, Debora Lamm, Cláudia Abreu, Sílvia Buarque, Bia Nunnes, Guilherme Fontes, Hamilton Vaz Pereira, Ricky Tavares and Eduardo Sterblitch.
