= Helpless =

Helpless may refer to:

== Film, television and theatre ==
- Helpless, a 1996 film by Shinji Aoyama
- Helpless (2012 film), a South Korean thriller
- "Helpless" (Buffy the Vampire Slayer), a 1999 TV episode
- Helpless (play), a 2000 play by Dusty Hughes

== Songs ==
- "Helpless" (Crosby, Stills, Nash & Young song), 1970
- "Helpless" (Hamilton song), from the musical Hamilton, 2015
- "Helpless (You Took My Love)", by the Flirts, 1984
- "Helpless", by Backstreet Boys from This Is Us, 2009
- "Helpless", by Diamond Head from Lightning to the Nations, 1980
- "Helpless", by Electric Light Orchestra from Flashback, 2000
- "Helpless", by Faith No More from Album of the Year, 1997
- "Helpless", by Gucci Mane from Droptopwop, 2017
- "Helpless", by the Hardkiss from Perfection Is a Lie, 2017
- "Helpless", by John Mayer from The Search for Everything: Wave Two, 2017
- "Helpless", by Kim Weston, 1966
- "Helpless", by Neon Trees from Habits, 2010
- "Helpless", by the Platters, 1957
- "Helpless", by Sugar from Copper Blue, 1992
