= Leandro Hassum =

Brazilian actor, comedian, writer, and film producer

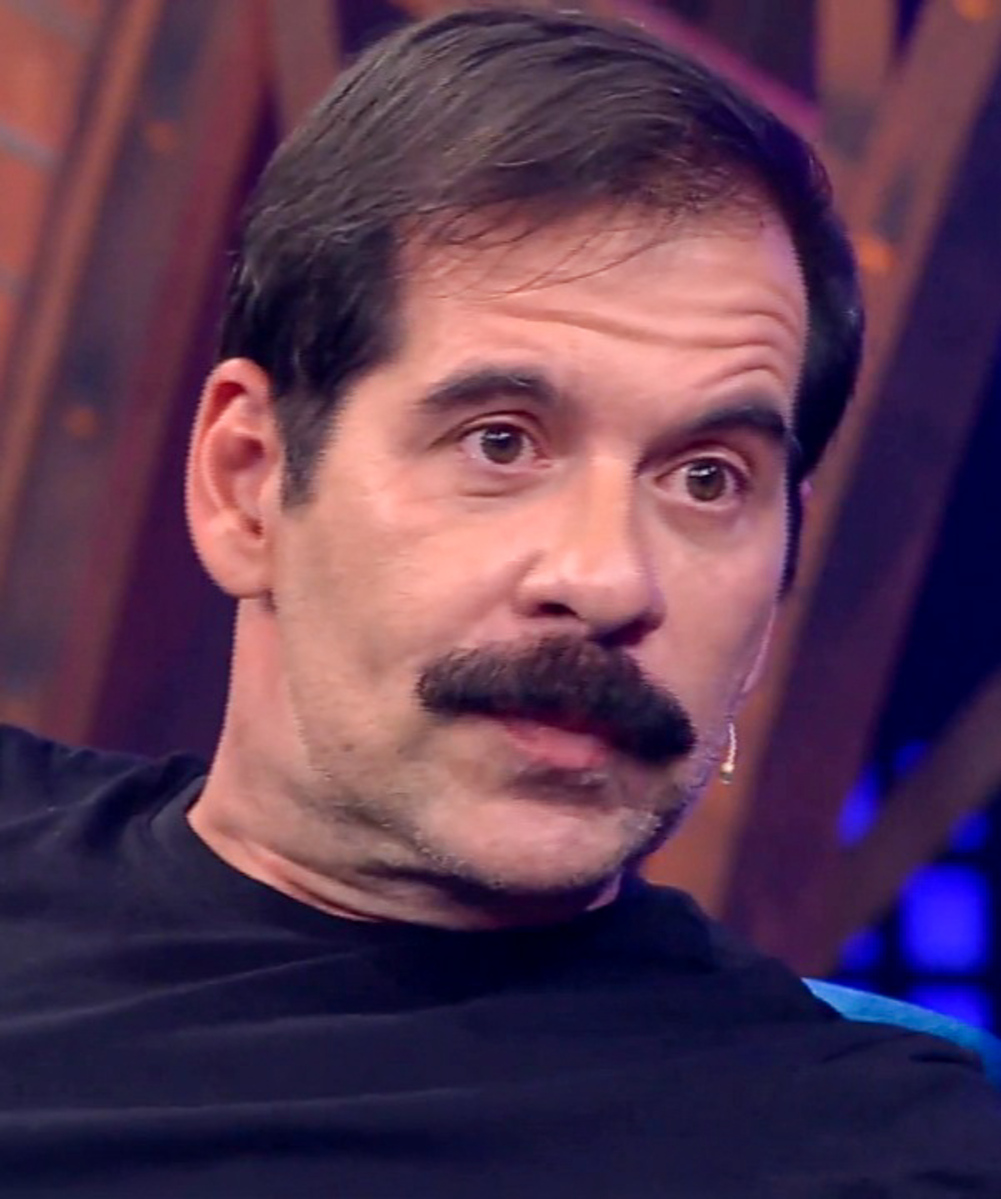
- Hassum in 2021
- Born: Leandro Hassum Moreira; 26 September 1973 (age 53); Niterói, Rio de Janeiro, Brazil
- Occupations: Actor; comedian; screenwriter; film producer
- Years active: 1990–present
- Spouse: Karina Gomes (m. 1997)

Leandro Hassum Moreira (born 26 September 1973) is a Brazilian actor, comedian, writer, and film producer. He is well known for having played Jorginho in the TV Show humorous Zorra Total and Os Caras de Pau. In 2012, he starred in the franchise Até que a Sorte nos Separe that reached 320,000 box office in its first weekend of exhibition and became the best opening of a national film of that year gaining two more sequels.

== Filmography ==
=== Television ===
| Year | Title | Role |
|---|---|---|
| 2016 - 2017 | A Cara do Pai | Théo Moreira |
| 2015 - 2016 | Chapa Quente | Genésio de Souza |
| 2015 | Tomara que Caia | Captain Orlando |
| 2014 | Geração Brasil | Haroldo Barata Filho (Barata) |
| 2013 | Divertics | Several different characters |
| 2013 | Flor do Caribe | Jeff Glam |
| 2013 | O Dentista Mascarado | Sérgio |
| 2012 | Cheias de Charme | Himself |
| 2010 - 2013 | Os Caras de Pau | Jorginho (Jorge Felipe Albuquerque de Goniert Brandão) |
| 2009 | Dança dos Famosos | Himself (Participant) |
| 2006 | Os Caras de Pau | Jorginho |
| 2004 | As Aventuras do Txutxucão | Detective James Banha |
| 2003 | Xuxa no Mundo da Imaginação | Security |
| 2003 | A Grande Família | Rodrigo |
| 2000 - 2010 | Zorra Total | DJ Gogó de Ouro/Saraiva/Jorginho |
| 2012 | Osmar a Primeira Fatia do Pão de Forma | Stevie |
| 1999 | Você Decide | Episode: Family Sex: Part 1 |
| 1998 | Pecado Capital | Marcos |

=== Film ===
| Year | Title | Role |
|---|---|---|
| 2023 | A vampire in the family | Fernandinho |
| 2022 | Vizinho | Valtinho |
| 2021 | Just Short of Perfect | Ricardo Leão |
| 2020 | Tudo Bem no Natal que Vem | Jorge |
| 2018 | Não Se Aceitam Devoluções | Juca Valente |
| 2017 | Dona Flor e Seus Dois Maridos | Dr. Teodoro Madureira |
| 2017 | Malasartes e o Duelo com a Morte | Esculápio |
| 2015 | Até Que A Sorte Nos Separe 3: A Falência Final | Faustino Araújo Peixoto (Tino) |
| 2014 | Os Caras de Pau em O Misterioso Roubo do Anel | Jorginho |
| 2014 | O Candidato Honesto | João Ernesto Praxedes |
| 2014 | Vestido pra Casar | Fernando |
| 2013 | Até que a Sorte nos Separe 2 | Faustino Araújo Peixoto (Tino) |
| 2013 | Eu Não Faço a Menor Ideia do que eu Tô Fazendo Com a Minha Vida | Uncle of Clara |
| 2012 | Até que a Sorte nos Separe | Faustino Araújo Peixoto (Tino) |
| 2012 | Se Puder... Dirija! | Ednelson |
| 2010 | Eu e Meu Guarda-Chuva | Brazilian taxi driver in Prague |
| 2010 | Muita Calma Nessa Hora | Sargento Nabuco |
| 2009 | O Mistério de Feiurinha | Mirror Genius |
| 2007 | Meteoro | Gordo |
| 2006 | No Meio da Rua | Alcides |
| 2006 | Xuxa Gêmeas | Zé Mané |
| 2006 | Muito Gelo e Dois Dedos d'Água | Engraçadinho |
| 2006 | Irma Vap - O Retorno | Luiz Alberto Jr. (Lula) |
| 2006 | Se Eu Fosse Você | Maurício |
| 2004 | Xuxa e o Tesouro da Cidade Perdida | Bunzão |
| 2004 | Tainá 2: A New Amazon Adventure | Zé Grilo |
| 2003 | Xuxa Abracadabra | Barba Azul / Príncipe Sapo |
| 1990 | Festinha de Arromba | Champion Motel |

=== Dubbing ===
| Year | Title | Role |
|---|---|---|
| 2024 | Despicable Me 4 | Gru |
| 2023 | Once Upon a Studio | Rhino (Archival Recordings) |
| 2022 | Minions: The Rise of Gru | Gru (child) |
| 2017 | Despicable Me 3 | Gru / Dru |
| 2015 | Minions | Gru (child) |
| 2015 | Pixels | Clyde |
| 2013 | Free Birds | Zeca |
| 2013 | Despicable Me 2 | Gru |
| 2013 | Osmar the First Slice of the Loaf | Stevie |
| 2011 | Allods | Level Up Games |
| 2010 | Despicable Me | Gru |
| 2008 | Bolt | Rhino |

== Theatre ==
- 2009: Um Casal Aberto, Ma Non Troppo
- 2008-atualmente: Lente de Aumento
- 2006-2007: Nós no Tempo
- 2006: O Livro Secreto
- 2004–present: Nós na Fita
- 2004: Orlando Silva, O Cantor Das Multidões
- 2003 e 2008: Os Sem-Vergonhas
- 2003: Mercedes de Medelin
- 2001: Aracy de Almeida no País da Araca
- 2001: Plunct Plact Zuuum
- 2001: Descontrole Remoto
- 2001: Dia dos Namorados
- 2001: Tudo no Escuro
- 2000-2004: Festa na Floresta
- 2000: Toda Donzela Tem Um Pai Que É Uma Fera
- 2000: Francisco de Assis
- 2000: Deus É Gordo
- 1999: Endependência
- 1995: Pluft, o Fantasminha
- 1995: Arca de Noé
- 1994: Dois Fernandos e Um Fernandes
- 1990: A Aurora da Minha Vida

== Awards and nominations ==
| Year | Awards ceremony | Award | Results |
|---|---|---|---|
| 2014 | Best of the Year Award | Comedy | Won |
| 2013 | Best of the Year Award | Comedy | Won |
| 2012 | Best of the Year Award | Comedy | Nominated |
| 2011 | Best of the Year Award | Comedy | Nominated |
| 2012 | Quem Award | Best Film Actor | Won |
| 2011 | Meus Prêmios Nick | Best comedian | Won |
| 2010 | Best of the Year Award | Best comedian | Won |
| 2010 | Art and Quality Brazil Award | Best comedian | Nominated |
| 2008 | Best of the Year Award | Best comedian | Nominated |
| 2006 | Zilka Salaberry Award | Best Children's Theater Actor | Won |
| 1992 | Coca-Cola Award | Best Actor | Won |
