= Até que a Sorte nos Separe 2 =

2013 film directed by Roberto Santucci

- Theatrical release poster
- Directed by: Roberto Santucci
- Written by: Paulo Cursino; Chico Soares
- Starring: Leandro Hassum; Camila Morgado; Jerry Lewis; Anderson Silva
- Cinematography: Juarez Pavelak
- Edited by: Leo Clark
- Production companies: Globo Filmes; Gullane
- Distributed by: Paris Filmes; Downtown Filmes
- Release date: December 27, 2013
- Country: Brazil
- Language: Portuguese
- Budget: R$ 7,000,000

Até que a Sorte nos Separe 2 (transl. Till Luck Do Us Part 2) is a 2013 Brazilian comedy film directed by Roberto Santucci and written by Paulo Cursino and Chico Soares. It is a sequel of the 2012 film Até que a Sorte nos Separe. Leandro Hassum who had played the protagonist in the previous film, back to reprise his role, while Danielle Winits who had played Jane in the previous film, was replaced by Camila Morgado. The film features a cameo by American actor Jerry Lewis.

== Plot ==
After losing everything, Tino is more cash-strapped than ever. That is until he receives the news of the death of Olavo, the uncle of his wife Jane, and discovers that he left an inheritance of R$100 million to her. He then makes a trip to Las Vegas. One night, after gambling, he discovers that he has lost everything and that he owes money to the Mexican Mafia.

== Cast ==
- Leandro Hassum as Tino
- Camila Morgado as Jane
- Julia Dalavia as Teté
- Jerry Lewis as Bellboy
- Rita Elmôr as Laura
- Anderson Silva as Detective Andrew Silver
- Berta Loran as Manuela da Silva
- Charles Paraventi as García
- Henry Fiuka as Juninho

== Release ==
=== Box office ===
In its first weekend in theaters, the film took almost 550,000 people to theaters, the largest opening of a Brazilian production in 2013.
