= Los Angeles Brazilian Film Festival =

- Location: Los Angeles, California, U.S.
- Founded: 2007; 18 years ago
- Founded by: Meire Fernandes; Nazareno Paulo
- Website: labrff.com

The Los Angeles Brazilian Film Festival is a film festival held in Los Angeles, California. First held in 2008, the festival is dedicated to showcase Brazilian cinema and films made by Brazilian-American filmmakers. The festival has been dubbed "the most prestigious Brazilian film festival outside of Brazil".

== History ==
The festival was founded in 2007 by Meire Fernandes and Nazareno Paulo. The festival hands out awards for select films, including for best feature film, documentaries, shorts, and best kids movies. They also host seminars and workshops, as well as networking opportunities for filmmakers, during the Brazilian Film Market section. The organization has showcased over 1300 films since the festival's inception.

The inaugural edition was held in 2008, going from March 5 to March 7 at the Landmark in West Los Angeles. The first film shown there was Bellini and the Devil, where lead actor Fábio Assunção won the award for Best Actor.

The 2012 edition hosted the world premiere of Márcio Garcia's film Open Road. The Los Angeles Film School hosted the 2013 edition of the festival. In 2015, the festival made its debut at Harmony Gold Theatre in Hollywood, with additional screenings at the Regent Theatre. A film made by both Fernandes and Paulo, Colors of Love, was shown at the 2015 edition. The 2020 edition was adapted for a "stay home" format due to the COVID-19 pandemic, including allowing for the audience to vote for their favorite movie.

As of 2023, the festival is held at the Culver Theater, near Culver Studios in Culver City. During the 2023 edition, 40% of the films selected were made by female filmmakers, and 30% of the films came from filmmakers from the North and Northeast of Brazil.
