= Malu Mader =

Brazilian actress (born 1969)

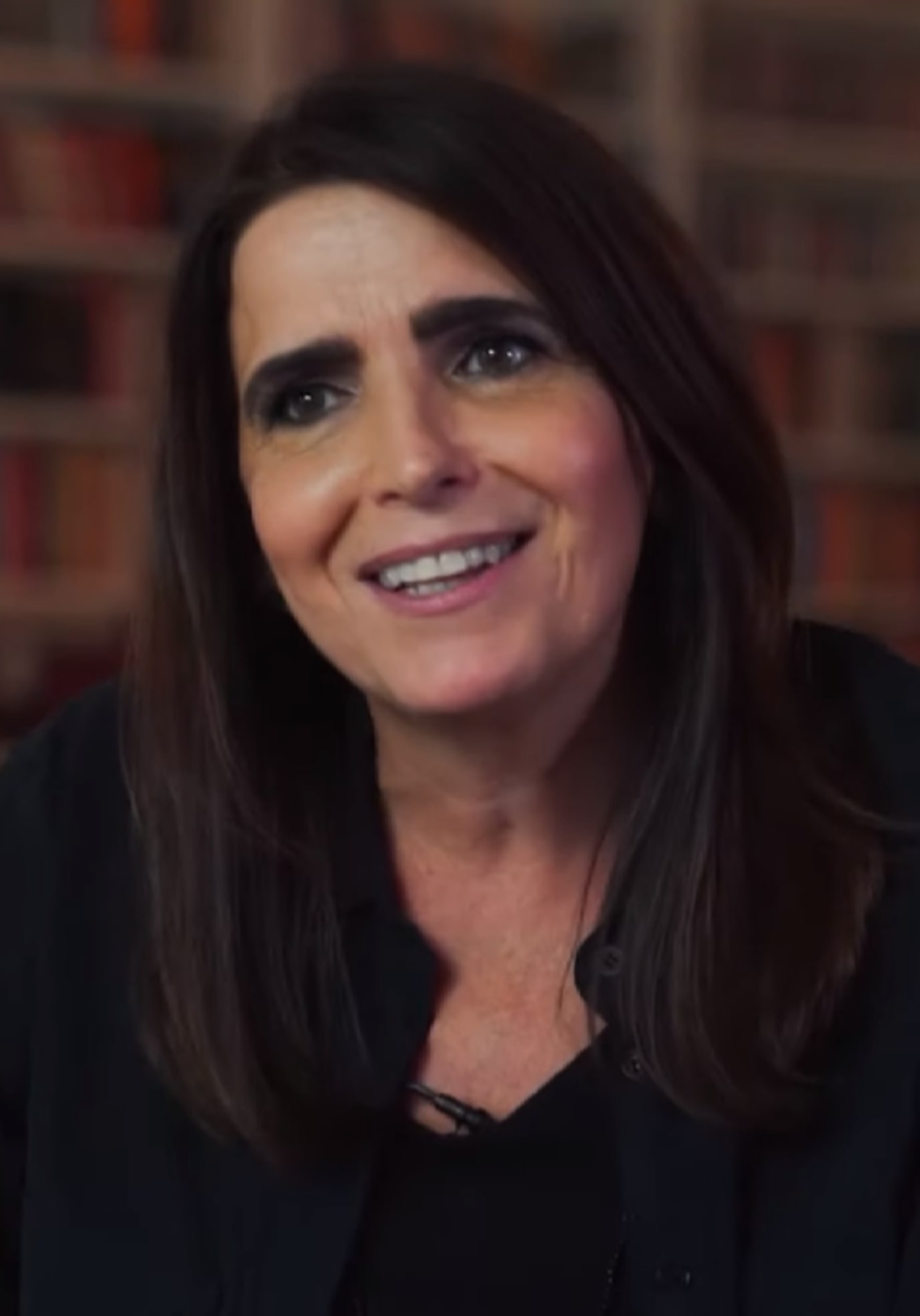
- Mader in 2020
- Born: Maria de Lourdes da Silveira Mäder; 12 September 1966 (age 58); Rio de Janeiro, Brazil
- Occupation: Actress
- Years active: 1981–present
- Spouse: Tony Bellotto (m. 1990)
- Children: João Mäder Bellotto (eldest son); Tony Mäder Bellotto (youngest son)
- Parent(s): Rubens Tramujas Mäder (father); Ângela Maria da Silveira (mother)
- Relatives: Luis Felipe Mäder (older brother); Patricia Mäder (older sister); Marco Antônio Barbosa de Alencar (brother-in-law); Erika Mäder (niece); Fernanda Mäder (niece)

Maria de Lourdes "Malu" da Silveira Mäder (born 12 September 1966) is a Brazilian actress.

== Biography ==
Born in Rio de Janeiro, she is the daughter of Rubens Tramujas Mäder, a Brazilian army colonel (who gives his name to the RJ-163 highway, which goes to Penedo) and Ângela Maria da Silveira, a social worker. She is of Lebanese, Luxembourgish and Portuguese descent. At age 10 she was taken by her cousin Maísa, who was starting to date her older brother, to watch the play Capitães da Areia, and then she decided to perform.

In 1972, she enrolled in the course for actors at the Tablado Theater, directed by Maria Clara Machado, and had as teacher Carlos Wilson, director of Capitães da Areia and also actress Louise Cardoso as a teacher.

== Personal life ==
She has been married since 1990 to musician, presenter and writer Tony Bellotto, who is part of the Brazilian rock band Titãs. Actress Betty Gofman was the mediator of the couple's formation. Two children were born from the union, João Mäder Bellotto, born May 14, 1995, and Antonio Mäder Bellotto, born September 1, 1997.

== Filmography ==
- 2024: Renascer - Aurora Guimarães Loureiro (special appearance)
- 2018: Malhação: Vidas Brasileiras - Melissa Kavaco (special appearance)
- 2018: Tempo de Amar - Ester Delamare, the Baroness of Sobral (special appearance)
- 2016: Haja Coração - Rebeca Rocha de La Fuente
- 2013: Sangue Bom - Rosemere Moreira
- 2010: Ti Ti Ti - Suzana Martins
- 2008: Sexo Com Amor? - Paula (film)
- 2007: Eterna Magia - Eva Sullivan
- 2004: Sexo Amor & Traição - Ana
- 2004: A Grande Família - Himself (special appearance)
- 2003: Celebridade - Maria Clara Diniz
- 2002: O Invasor - Cláudia/Fernanda
- 2001: Sítio do Picapau Amarelo - Cuca disguised as Malu Mader
- 2001: Bellini and the Sphinx - Fátima
- 2000: Brava Gente (episode: "Dia de Visita") - Delourdes
- 1999: Força de um Desejo - Ester Delamare, the Baroness of Sobral
- 1998: Labirinto - Paula Lee
- 1997: A Justiceira - Diana
- 1996: A Vida Como Ela É...
- 1993: O Mapa da Mina - Wanda Machado
- 1992: Anos Rebeldes - Maria Lúcia
- 1991: O Dono do Mundo - Márcia
- 1989: Top Model - Duda (Maria Eduarda)
- 1988: Fera Radical - Cláudia
- 1987: O Outro - Glorinha da Abolição
- 1986: Anos Dourados - Lurdinha
- 1985: Ti Ti Ti - Valquíria
- 1984: Corpo a Corpo - Beatriz Fraga Dantas (Bia)
- 1983: Eu Prometo - Dóris Cantomaia
