= Marcela Barrozo =

Brazilian actress

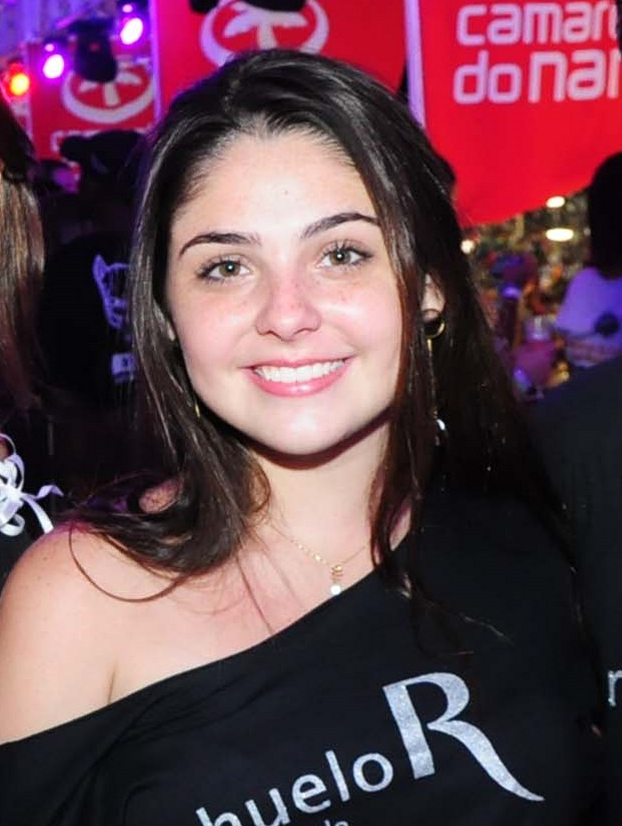
- Marcela in 2013 Carnival
- Born: Marcela de Sousa Barrozo; January 21, 1992 (age 34); Niterói, Rio de Janeiro, Brazil
- Occupation: actress
- Years active: 2001–present

Marcela de Sousa Barrozo (born Niterói, Rio de Janeiro, January 21, 1992) is a Brazilian theatre and screen actress.

== TV career ==
- 2002 - Sabor da Paixão .... Madona
- 2003 - Chocolate com Pimenta .... Estela Albuquerque
- 2004 - Senhora do Destino .... Bianca Ferreira da Silva
- 2005/2007 - Os Amadores .... Maria
- 2006 - Malhação .... Antônia Valença
- 2006 - JK .... Maria "Nana" da Conceição (child)
- 2007/2008 - Duas Caras .... Ramona Monteiro Duarte
- 2009 - Bela, a Feia .... Ludmila Freitas
- 2015 - Os Dez Mandamentos .... Betania

== Film career ==
- 2013 - Odeio o Dia dos Namorados .... Young Débora

== Theatre career ==
- 2001 - Severina .... Nena
- 2004 - Adolescente Faz Cada Uma
- 2005/2006 - O Rapto das Cebolinhas .... Lúcia
