= André Di Mauro =

Brazilian actor, director, producer, writer and screenwriter

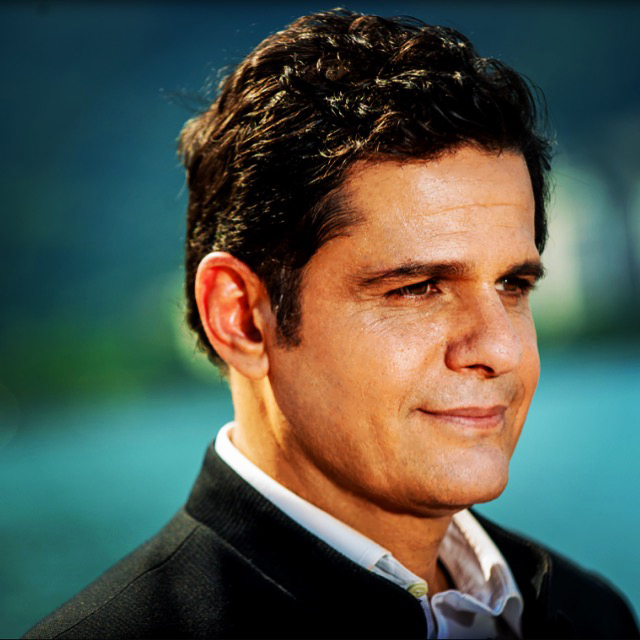
- Born: André Felippe Di Mauro; October 27, 1964 (age 61); Rio de Janeiro, Brazil
- Occupations: actor, director, producer, screenwriter, playwright and writer
- Years active: 1979–present
- Spouse: Liége Muller
- Children: 2
- Relatives: Humberto Mauro (grand-uncle)
- Awards: Awards as Director and Producer: Best Film – Humberto Mauro – 15th Play-Doc International Documentary Film Festival Awards as Actor: Best Actor – Los Angeles Urban Film Festival – Urban Survivor; Best Actor – Boston Independent Film Festival – Urban Survivor
- Website: www.andredimauro.com

André Felippe Di Mauro (born Rio de Janeiro, October 27, 1964) is a Brazilian actor, director, producer, writer and screenwriter. As an actor he played characters in popular works such as "Rodrigues" in the film Elite Squad and "Lipe" of the soap opera Chamas da Vida. He is the great-nephew of filmmaker Humberto Mauro, pioneer of cinema in Brazil, author of the book Humberto Mauro – the father of Brazilian cinema and director of the film "Humberto Mauro" selected for the 75th Venice International Film Festival the world premiere took place on September 5, 2018. And the premiere in Brazil took place at the 51st Festival de Brasília of Brazilian Cinema and still in 2018, the film participated in other important festivals and shows such as the 42nd São Paulo International Film Festival the 20th Festival do Rio (Première Brasil Hors Concours) and the 40th Havana Festival (in Spanish: Festival Internacional del Nuevo Cine Latinoamericano de La Habana), among others. In 2019, he participated in two more important film festivals in Europe, the 48th International Film Festival Rotterdam (International Film Festival Rotterdam - IFFR) and the 15th Play-Doc International Documentary Film Festival (Spain ) where the film won the award for "Best Film".

== Filmography ==
=== Film ===
Year	Title	Role	Notes
1984	Os Bons Tempos Voltaram (The Good Times Back)	Actor / Character: Almir	Feature film
1986	As Sete Vampiras (The Seven Vampires)	Actor / Character: Salvio	Feature film
1986	Rock Estrela (Rock Star)	Actor / Character: Dudu	Feature film
1987	Leila Diniz	Actor / Character: André	Feature film
1988	Banana Split (filme)	Actor / Character: Nei	Feature film
1989	O Grande Mentecapto (The Great Moron)	Actor / Character: Humberto Mauro	Feature film
1990	Pure Juice	Actor / Character: Carlos	Feature film
1991	Búzios, Um Estado de Espírito (Búzios One State Of Mind)	Actor / Character: Himself	Tele film
1992	Pra Ter Ciúmes Basta Ter Alguém (To have Jealousy Just Have Someone)	Screenwriter/Director/Producer	Tele film
1993	Hóspedes Que Vieram de Longe ( Guest Who Came To Far)	Screenwriter/Director/Producer	Tele film
1994	O Caminho das Formigas (The Path Of The Ants)	Screenwriter/Director/Producer	Short film
1995	Salve A Prainha (Save Prainha)	Interwier / Co-Producer	Documentary
1996	Região Dos Lagos(Lakes Region)	Director/Co-Producer	Documentary
1997	O Mistério da Mala (The Bag's Mystery)	Screenwriter/Executive Producer	Short film
1998	Voce Sabe Quem (You Know Who)	Executive Producer	Short film
1999	Coleira De Abutres (Collar Of Vultures)	Production Coordinator	Short film
2000	Namorada Tristeza (Girlfriend Sadness)	Production Coordinator	Short film
2001	Licor de Arbusto (Bush's Liquor)	Production Coordinator	Short film
2001	Pedro Pintor em Auto-retrato (Peter Painter in Self-portrait)	Production Coordinator	Short film
2003	Grafite (Graphite)	Producer	Short film
2007	Elite Squad	Actor / Character: Pedro Rodrigues	Golden Bear Berlin Film Festival
2008	O Amolador (The Grinder)	Actor / Character: Amolador	Short film
2009	Mapa-Múndi	Actor / Character: Lucas	Short film
2010	Entre Macacos e Anjos	Actor / Character: Fausto	Feature film
2012	A Casa Elétrica (Electric House)	Actor / Character: Carlos "Carlino" Leonetti	Feature film
2014	Sobrevivente Urbano (Urban Survivor)	Actor / Character: Daniel	Winner Best Actor Boston Independent Film Festival 2015
2015	Nova Amsterdam	Actor / Character: João Santiago	Feature film
2016	Efeito Lua (Moon Effect)	Screenwriter, Producer and Director	Best Documentary Short Film Award at the Canada Independent Film Festival
2018	Humberto Mauro, cinema is waterfall	Screenwriter, Editor, Producer and Director	Official selection of the 75th Venice International Film Festival – Venice Classics Documentary Films / 15th Play-Doc International Documentary Film Festival (Tui – Spain) "Best Film" Award. Oscar contender 2020 – Documentary Feature.
2020	Death Protocol'	Screenwriter, Editor, Producer and Director	Oscar contend 2021 in the categories: Documentary Feature, Original Song with the song "Protocol" and Original Score.

== Television ==
=== TV ===
Year	Title	Role	Notes
1983	Eu Prometo	Beto	
1985	Antônio Maria (Manchete)	Eduardo	
1986	Selva de Pedra	Guido	
1987	A Rainha da Vida	André Valadares	
1990	Rainha da Sucata	Manuel Moniz de Sousa (Maneco)	
1992	Perigosas Peruas	Dentinho	
1997	Xica da Silva	Dom Duarte	
2005	Prova de Amor	João Bonforte	
2006	Bicho do Mato	Pedro	
2007	Donas de Casa Desesperadas (Brazil)	Miguel Delfino	Desperate Housewives – Brazilian version
2008	Chamas da Vida	Felipe Rezende (Lipe)	
2010	A História de Ester	Hegai	
2010	Balada, Baladão	Policial Teixeira	
2011	Vidas em Jogo	Carlos Nobre Batista	
2013	Balacobaco	Arnaud Bittencourt	
2014	Vitória	Jorge	

== Theatre ==
=== Plays ===
- 2004: O Incorruptível by Helder Costa
- 2003: Personalíssima – Galvão (by Júlio Ficher, Directed by Jaqueline Lawrence, Produced by Rosamaria Murtinho)
- 1997/1998: Hilda Furacão (1997/1998) – Frei Malthus (by Roberto Drummond, Directed by Marcelo Andrade)
- 1995/1996: The Rocky Horror Show – Brad (by Richard O'Brien, Directed by Jorge Fernando) (Prêmio Sharp, Prêmio Cultura Inglesa e Prêmio SATED)
- 1993/1994: Spring Awakening ("Despertar da Primavera") – Mel (by Frank Wedekind, version by Tiago Santiago, Directed by Rogério Fabiano)
- 1991: Entre O Neon e a Lua lá de Casa (by André Di Mauro, Directed by Anselmo Vasconcelos)
- 1988: Uma Só Andorinha Não Faz Verão (by Giulliano Nandi, Directed by Márcio Meireles, Produced by Ítala Nandi)
- 1987: A Bela Adormecida – Prince Felipe (by Fernando Berditcheviski, Produced by Mírian Rios)
- 1986: A Streetcar Named Desire ("Um Bonde Chamado Desejo") (By Tennessee Williams, Directed by Maurice Vaneu, produced by Tereza Rachel)
- 1985: Os Doze Trabalhos de Hécules – Part 2 (by Monteiro Lobato, Directed by Carlos Wilson, Produced by Tablado)
- 1984: Azul (by André Di Mauro, Produced by Fábio Barreto)
- 1983: Os Doze Trabalhos de Hécules – Parte 1 (by Monteiro Lobato, Directed by Carlos Wilson, Produced by Tablado)
- 1982: Vai e Vem (by André Di Mauro, Directed by Marco Antônio Palmeira, Produced by Artimanhas D'Arte)
- 1981: Vira- Avesso (by André Di Mauro, Directed by Milton Dobbin) – Prêmio INACEN (Instituto Nacional de Artes Cênicas) – Troféu Mambembe – Category: Revelação como Ator e Autor * Prêmio Molière de Teatro – Category: Especial

== Awards and nominations ==
=== Movies, TV and theatre ===
Year	Awards	Category	Nominated work	Result	Notes
1981	Troféu Mambembe	Revelation Actor and Author	Vira-Avesso	Won	Theatre
1981	Prêmio Molière	Special Award	Vira-Avesso	Won	Theatre
1995	I Prêmio Sharp de Teatro	Producer – Best Play	Rocky Horror Show	Won	Theatre
1995	Prêmio de Teatro Cultura Inglesa	Producer Best Play	Rocky Horror Show	Won	Theatre
1995	Prêmio de Teatro S.A.T.E.D.	Producer Best Musical Production	Rocky Horror Show	Won	Theatre
2009	Prêmio Contigo! de TV de 2009	Best Supporting Actor	Lipe – Chamas da Vida	Nominated	TV
2011	Prêmio Top Empresarial Internacional	National Prominence Artistic	Carlos – Vidas em Jogo	Won	TV
2012	Prêmio Contigo! de TV de 2012	Best Actor	Carlos – Vidas em Jogo	Nominated	TV
2012	II Prêmio Destaques da Record	Best Actor	Carlos – Vidas em Jogo	Won	TV
2015	10º Melhores do Ano – Minha Novela	Best Supporting Actor	Jorge – Vitória	Won	TV
2015	Boston Independent Film Festival 2015	Best Actor	Daniel – Urban Survivor	Won	Movies
2015	Los Angeles Urban Film Festival 2015	Best Actor	Daniel – Urban Survivor	Won	Movies
