= Cinema da Boca do Lixo =

Film Genre

Cinema da Boca do Lixo (Mouth of Garbage film) is the collective name for a film genre associated with the Boca do Lixo ("Mouth of Garbage") downtown area of São Paulo, Brazil. On par with Hong Kong "Category III" movies and American slasher films, films of this genre are exploitational and often considered B movies. These films often feature eroticism.

== Background ==
The underworld of Boca de Lixo was an attraction for Cinema Marginal protagonists, most remarkably represented by Rogério Sganzerla's manifesto film O Bandido da Luz Vermelha (1968), that depicted the story of criminal João Acácio Pereira da Costa. The 1970s saw an influx of production companies to the area and producers such as Antônio Polo Galante, David Cardoso, Nelson Teixeira Mendes, Juan Bajon, Cláudio Cunha, Aníbal Massaini Neto made investments in Boca de Lixo. The result was cinema da Boca, low-budget films with superficial content, produced for quick returns to investors. Although identified foremost with pornochanchadas, Boca was the center of a set of various subgenres of exploitation films including comedies, crime films, action films, and kung fu films. The end of censorship in Brazilian cinema after the fall of the military regime in 1985, pornographic films began to be produced as well.

=== Notable Directors ===
- Rogério Sganzerla
- Carlos Reichenbach
- Luiz Castelini
- Alfredo Sternheim
- Juan Bajon
- Cláudio Cunha
- Walter Hugo Khouri
- José Mojica Marins

== Notable films ==
- A Margem (The Margin). (Ozualdo Candeias, 1967)
- O Bandido da Luz Vermelha (The Red Light Bandit). (Rogério Sganzerla, 1968)
- O Ritual dos Sádicos (Awakening of the Beast) (José Mojica Marins, 1969)
- Matou a Família e Foi ao Cinema (Killed the Family and Went to the Movies). (Júlio Bressane, 1969)

== See also ==
- Cinema of Brazil
- Cult film
