= Histórias Que Nossas Babás não Contavam =

1979 film by Oswaldo de Oliveira

- Directed by: Oswaldo de Oliveira
- Written by: Ody Fraga
- Produced by: Anibal Massaini Neto
- Cinematography: Oswaldo de Oliveira
- Edited by: José Luiz Andreone
- Release date: 1979
- Running time: 97 minutes
- Country: Brazil

Histórias Que Nossas Babás não Contavam (transl. Stories Our Nannies Didn't Tell) is a 1979 Brazilian film directed by Oswaldo de Oliveira and written by Ody Fraga. It is an adaptation of the Snow White story. Although it failed to secure its lead actress stardom, it is considered as a classic of pornochanchada genre with blending chanchada, elements of softcore, a superficial content, and a vulgar sense of humour.

The film features an Afro-Brazilian actress, Adele Fátima, as Snow White. Snow White is not named "White" (branca) but clara (a Brazilian racial term similar to "high yellow", morena clara in full). Also the name "Clara das Neves" may be read as a real person's name. The forest in the film is a jungle home to wild animals such as jaguars, monkeys, and some odd white rabbits. Snow White dances to a samba-canção played and sung by the Dwarfs. Characters of the Dwarfs are influenced by the Disney movie.

== Synopsis ==
Snow White lives in the castle with her father and her stepmother. Prince is her stepmother's lover. Her father dies and her stepmother banishes Snow White. Prince and Snow White meet accidentally and start a love affair. Queen witnesses this affair and commissions a hunter (played by Costinha, a veteran Brazilian comedian) to kill Snow White. Snow White offers herself to the hunter to survive. She then flees to the forest. She is found unconscious by the Seven Dwarfs and taken to their cottage. Six of the Dwarfs (except Grumpy (Zangado) who is gay) make advances to sleep with Snow White. Queen learning from the mirror that she is still alive and happier, commits suicide by eating a poisonous apple. Prince goes into the forest to find Snow White. To end the conflict, Dwarfs decide to draw lots and Dopey (Dunga) wins. Snow White finds out that Dopey possesses a huge virile member. Next day, Prince arrives at the cottage to take Snow White. She refuses, telling the Prince that Dopey is her lover. Prince takes the tempting Grumpy instead.
