= Killed the Family and Went to the Movies =

Killed the Family and Went to the Movies may refer to:

- Killed the Family and Went to the Movies (1969 film), a Brazilian film directed by Júlio Bressane
- Killed the Family and Went to the Movies (1991 film), a Brazilian film directed by Neville de Almeida
