= Rodolfo Arena =

Brazilian actor

- Born: 15 December 1910; Araraquara, São Paulo, Brazil
- Died: 31 August 1980 (aged 69); Araraquara, São Paulo, Brazil
- Occupation: Actor
- Years active: 1920–1980

Rodolfo Arena (15 December 1910 – 31 August 1980) was a Brazilian actor. He appeared in 90 films between 1920 and 1980. He starred in the 1974 film Sagarana: The Duel, which was entered into the 24th Berlin International Film Festival.

== Selected filmography ==
- O Crime de Cravinhos (1920)
- Vidas Solidárias (1945)
- O Ébrio (1946) – José
- Sempre Resta Uma Esperança (1947)
- Écharpe de Seda (1950)
- Toda a Vida em Quinze Minutos (1953)
- Sinfonia Carioca (1955)
- Depois Eu Conto (1956)
- O Diamante (1956)
- O Boca de Ouro (1957)
- O Camelô da Rua Larga (1958) – Rafael
- Na Corda Bamba (1958)
- Pista de Grama (1958)
- Eu Sou o Tal (1959)
- Boca de Ouro (1963) – Dentist
- Crime no Sacopã (1963)
- Asfalto Selvagem (1964) – Captain
- Procura-se uma Rosa (1964)
- Menino de Engenho (1965) – José Paulino
- Encontro com a Morte (1965)
- Cristo de Lama (1966) – João Gomes
- Essa Gatinha é Minha (1966) – Delegado
- O Levante das Saias (1967) – Councilman
- Isabella in Capitu (1968) – José Dias
- Maria Bonita, Rainha do Cangaço (1968) – Colonel Canavieira
- Brazil Year 2000 (1969) – Priest
- Macunaíma (1969) – Maanape
- Killed the Family and Went to the Movies (1969) – Father
- Meu Nome É Lampião (1969)
- Pobre Príncipe Encantado (1969)
- Os Senhores da Terra (1970)
- Barão Olavo, o Horrível (1970) – Barão Olavo
- Vinte passos para a morte (1970) – Xavier
- Jesus Cristo, Eu Estou Aqui (1970) – João Turco
- In the Family (1971) – Seu Souza
- Lúcia McCartney, Uma Garota de Programa (1971)
- Aventuras com Tio Maneco (1971) – Grandfather
- Crioulo Doido (1971) – Ruralista
- Como Ganhar na Loteria sem Perder a Esportiva (1971)
- O Doce Esporte do Sexo (1971) – (segment "A Boca")
- Missão: Matar (1972) – Cordeiro
- S. Bernardo (1972) – Dr.Magalhães
- Independência ou Morte (1972)
- Jesuíno Brilhante, o Cangaceiro (1972) – Soares
- Eu Transo, Ela Transa (1972) – Afonso
- O Grande Gozador (1972)
- O Supercareta (1972)
- O Azarento (1973)
- Vai Trabalhar, Vagabundo! (1973)
- Joanna Francesa (1973)
- Sagarana: The Duel (1974)
- Motel (1974)
- O Mau-Caráter (1974) – Barão de Moncovil
- Brutos Inocentes (1974)
- Quando as Mulheres Querem Provas (1975) – Arquimedes
- Com as Calças na Mão (1975) – Lauro
- Costinha o Rei da Selva (1975)
- Enigma para Demônios (1975) – Ricardo
- O Roubo das Calcinhas (1975) – Deusdedith – Segment 1
- O Caçador de Fantasma (1975)
- Intimidade (1975) – Cícero
- O Flagrante (1976)
- The Last Plantation (1976)
- Xica da Silva (1976) – Sargento-Mor
- Tem Folga na Direção (1976)
- O Vampiro de Copacabana (1976) – Motorista
- A Noite dos Assassinos (1976)
- As Meninas Querem... Os Coroas Podem (1976)
- Padre Cícero (1976)
- Noite Sem Homem (1976)
- E As Pílulas Falharam (1976)
- Ladrões de Cinema (1977)
- Quem Matou Pacífico? (1977)
- Costinha e o King Mong (1977)
- Lady on the Bus (1978)
- A Summer Rain (1978)
- Maneco, o Super Tio (1978) – Camargo
- J.J.J., o Amigo do Super-Homem (1978)
- Sábado Alucinante (1979) – Afonso
- Eu Matei Lúcio Flávio (1979)
- O Coronel e o Lobisomem (1979)
- A Pantera Nua (1979) – Sebastian
- Bye Bye Brasil (1980) – Lavrador
- Bububu no Bobobó (1980)
- Parceiros da Aventura (1980) – Inspetor
- A Mulher Que Inventou o Amor (1980) – Doutor / Doctor Perdigão
- A Mulher Sensual (1981)
- O Torturador (1981) – Herman Stahl
- Fruto do Amor (1981) – (final film role)
