= Aldine Müller =

Brazilian actress (born 1953)

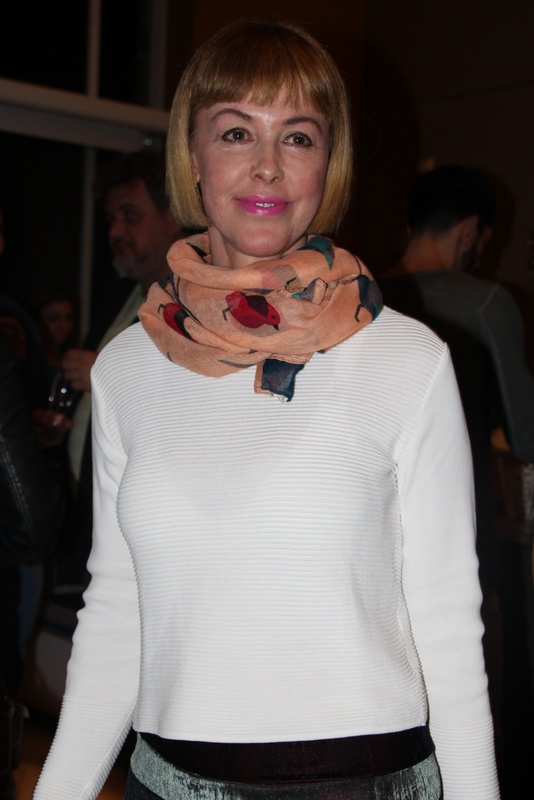
- Born: Aldina Rodrigues Raspini; 8 October 1953 (age 73); São José dos Ausentes, Rio Grande do Sul, Brazil
- Occupation: Actress
- Children: 1

Aldine Müller (born Aldina Rodrigues Raspini, 8 October 1953, São José dos Ausentes, Brazil) is a Brazilian actress. She was a prominent figure in the Brazilian sexploitation film genre known as Pornochanchada during the late 1970s.

Müller was born in 1953 to a Portuguese mother and an Italian father. She was married and has an adult son, Cézar Raspini da Fonseca.

== Filmography ==
=== Film ===
Year	Title	Role
2012	2 Coelhos	Sophia
1985	Noite	
1984	Amenic - Entre o Discurso e a Prática	
1983	Elite Devassa	
1983	Estranhos Prazeres de uma Mulher Casada	Meg
1982	A Noite do Amor Eterno	Lilian Davis
1982	Perdida em Sodoma	Cléo
1982	Excitação Diabólica	Constância
1982	Shock: Diversão Diabólica	Isa
1981	Bacanal	
1981	O Fotógrafo	Leninha
1981	O Império do Desejo	
1980	A Fêmea do Mar	Cassandra
1980	Colegiais e Lições de Sexo	Sílvia
1980	Consórcio de Intrigas	Aimée
1980	Convite ao Prazer	Sônia
1980	Força Estranha	
1980	A Boneca Cobiçada	
1980	A Mulher que Inventou o Amor	Doralice
1979	Os Imorais	Rosa
1979	Viúvas Precisam de Consolo	Selminha
1979	Nos Tempos da Vaselina	Lucinha
1979	Uma Cama para Sete Noivas	
1979	A Força dos Sentidos	Pérola
1979	O Prisioneiro do Sexo	Secretária
1978	O Artesão de Mulheres	Verinha
1978	O Estripador de Mulheres	Amante de Pascoal
1978	Bem Dotado, o Homem de Itu	Lurdinha
1978	Assassinato à Noite	
1978	Ninfas Diabólicas	Úrsula
1977	Dezenove Mulheres e um Homem	Jussara
1977	Internato de Meninas Virgens	Moça
1977	Coquetel do Sexo	
1977	Socorro! Eu Não Quero Morrer Virgem	Virgínia
1977	Paixão e Sombras	
1977	Segredo das Massagistas	Lorenia
1976	A Ilha das Cangaceiras Virgens	
1976	As Meninas Querem... Os Coroas Podem	Roberta
1975	As Fêmeas do Mar	
1975	Pesadelo Sexual de um Virgem	
1975	As Audaciosas	
1975	Os Pilantras da Noite	
1975	O Clube das Infiéis	

=== Television ===
Year	Title	Role	Notes	Channel
2013	Chiquititas	Vera	2013-2015	SBT
2007	Dance, Dance, Dance	Ângela Garcia		Rede Bandeirantes
2007	Show do Tom	various characters		Rede Record
2006	Cristal	Madre Montserrat		SBT
2004	A Escrava Isaura	Estela		Rede Record
2003	Jamais Te Esquecerei	Délia		SBT
1998	Serras Azuis	Ilsa Paleólogo		Rede Bandeirantes
1997	O Olho da Terra	Rosa		Rede Record
1996	Quem É Você?	Cristina		Rede Globo
1992	Escolinha do Professor Raimundo	Dona Flor	1992-1995	Rede Globo
1991	Estados Anysios de Chico City	various characters		Rede Globo
1990	Rainha da Sucata	Ângela		Rede Globo
1989	Cortina de Vidro	Judite		SBT
1989	O Salvador da Pátria	Dinah		Rede Globo
1987	Sassaricando	Brigite		Rede Globo
1986	Tudo ou Nada	Berta		Rede Manchete
1985	Uma Esperança no Ar			SBT
1983	Razão de Viver	Rita		SBT
1983	Moinhos de Vento	Lídia		Rede Globo
1982	Casa de Pensão	Amélia		TV Cultura
1982	O Pátio das Donzelas	Maya		TV Cultura
