= Killed the Family and Went to the Movies (1991 film) =

1991 film directed by Neville d'Almeida

- Film poster
- Directed by: Neville de Almeida
- Written by: Júlio Bressane (story) and Neville de Almeida
- Starring: Cláudia Raia; Louise Cardoso; Alexandre Frota; Maria Gladys; Ana Beatriz Nogueira
- Distributed by: Cineville Produções Cinematográficas
- Release date: 1991
- Running time: 90 min.
- Country: Brazil
- Language: Portuguese

Matou a Família e Foi ao Cinema (Killed the Family and Went to the Movies) is a Brazilian film directed by Neville de Almeida and released in 1991. It is a remake of the original 1969 film directed by Júlio Bressane.

== Production ==
Actress Cláudia Raia talked about her difficulties in filming a nude scene with a horse for this movie. Raia said that for this scene, filmed on a cold dawn, she wore only a bodice and that the horse needed to be calmed down in a moment. "There was a scene of mine naked, only with a bodice, which we shot on a cold morning in Teresópolis. My character almost had sex with the horse, which was actually her dream. At a certain point, the horse went crazy and needed to be removed from the scene in order to get a little out of it ", she said.
