= Adele Fátima =

Brazilian model, dancer and actress

Adele Fátima Hahlbohm
- Born: Adele Fátima Hahlbohm; 17 February 1954; Rio de Janeiro, Brazil
- Occupations: model; actress; dancer

Adele Fátima (born 17 February 1954) is a Brazilian actress, model and dancer. She was one of Brazil's main sex symbols, especially in the 1970s and was a key figure in the sexploitation film genre known as Pornochanchada in Brazil in the 1970s.

== Biography ==
In 1972, sponsored by Augusto César Vanucci, Adele became part of the casting of the Globo TV network, and, from there she started her career in comedy cameos. In 1973, she started acting in movies, and began her film career. In 1978, Adele was noted after her appearance in an advertisement, where she danced in a bikini. After this, she was invited by Albert Broccoli to play the role of a Brazilian girl in the film Moonraker from the James Bond series. Although her name and photo appeared in the film's credits and its publicity, she was replaced by Emily Bolton and the scenes in which she appeared were cut from the final edition. In 1979, she played the protagonist Clara das Neves in Histórias Que Nossas Babás não Contavam, a sensual parody of the story of Snow White. The film was a public success in Brazilian cinema and also on television, being shown constantly in the night sessions of SBT in the 1980s. The same year, she played a lead role in the film Histórias Que Nossas Babás não Contavam (Stories that our nannies didn't tell), a satire of the classic Snow White and the Seven Dwarfs. It is considered one of the most emblematic film of the pornochanchada genre. A major milestone in Adele's career happened in 1988 after her appearance in a commercial for the canned sardine, Sardinhas 88, which featured the number 88 stamped at the back of her bikini thong.

== Filmography ==
=== Film ===
Year	Title	Role	Director
1975	Com as Calças na Mão	Joana	Carlo Mossy
1976	O Flagrante		Reginaldo Faria
1976	As Massagistas Profissionais	Rosa	Carlo Mossy
1977	Os Amores da Pantera	Nara	Jece Valadão
1977	As Granfinas e o Camelô	Hilda, the star	Ismar Porto
1978	Lady on the Bus	Samba dancer	Neville de Almeida
1978	O Homem de Seis Milhões de Cruzeiros contra as Panteras	Gata	Luís Antônio Piá
1978	Manicures a Domicílio	Conceição	Carlo Mossy
1979	Moonraker	Manuela (scenes deleted)	Lewis Gilbert
1979	Histórias Que Nossas Babás Não Contavam	Clara das Neves	Osvaldo de Oliveira
1986	Fulaninha		David Neves
1987	Si tu vas à Rio... tu meurs	Wife of Vinicius	Philippe Clair
1988	As Divas Negras do Cinema Brasileiro	Herself	Vik Birkbeck
1988	Natal da Portela	Dona Lota	Paulo César Saraceni
1999	Traveller	Prostitute	Paulo César Saraceni
2018	Histórias Que Nosso Cinema (Não) Contava	Archive footage	Fernanda Pessoa

=== Television ===
Ano	Título	Personagem	Emissora
1993	Agosto	Zuleika	Rede Globo
1994	Memorial de Maria Moura	Cafetina	Rede Globo
