= Segreto =

Segreto is a surname. Notable people with the surname include:

- Affonso Segreto (1875–?), Italian-Brazilian filmmaker
- Ric Segreto (1952–1998), American-Filipino musician, actor, teacher, journalist and historian
- Samuele Segreto (born 2004), Italian dancer and actor
