= A Mulher que Inventou o Amor =

- Theatrical release poster. On the censorship bar covering her breasts, it reads "Released by the Superior Censorship Board".
- Directed by: Jean Garrett
- Written by: João Silvério Trevisan
- Starring: Aldine Müller; Zécarlos de Andrade; Rodolfo Arena; Roberto Miranda
- Production companies: E. C. Distribuição e Importação Cinematográfica; Marte Filmes
- Distributed by: Seleção Ouro Nacional
- Release date: 20 October 1980
- Running time: 100 minutes
- Country: Brazil
- Language: Portuguese

A Mulher que Inventou o Amor is a 1980 Brazilian romantic drama film directed by Jean Garrett, written by João Silvério Trevisan, and starring Aldine Müller. Produced in the Boca do Lixo district, the film tells the story of Doralice, a naive and humble young woman who, after being raped by a butcher, transforms into a prostitute who controls men by simulating her own pleasure, while nurturing the dream of marrying a famous television actor.

== Plot ==
Doralice is a naive and romantic young woman who ultimately transforms into a successful prostitute. Known as the "Queen of the Moan", her situation improves after meeting Dr. Perdigão, an elderly millionaire who chooses her as his exclusive mistress. She changes her name to Tallullah and begins pursuing César Augusto, a television actor she has always admired, eventually succeeding in seducing him. César submits to Tallullah's desires as she teaches him all the secrets of her profession. Torn between fascination and repulsion for the woman, César ultimately rejects her. To compensate for her suffering, Tallullah gives herself to other men solely to humiliate them. She regains her self-confidence and once again attempts to attract the actor. She invites him to dinner, and after making love, Tallullah kills him. Feeling at peace, Tallullah listens to the "Wedding March" beside her deceased lover.

== Cast ==
- Aldine Müller as Doralice/Tallullah
- Rodolfo Arena as Dr. Perdigão
- Zécarlos de Andrade
- Ricardo Angelini
- Carlos Arena
- Theresa Bianchi
- Nerzídio Bonacin
- Lola Brah as Doralice's mentor
- Simone Carvalho
- Renée Casemart
- Oswaldo Cirillo
- Walter Colletti
- Marcelo Dantas
- Genésio de Carvalho
- Rita de Cássia
- Osly Delano
- Jairo Ferreira
- Edgard Franco

== Reception ==
Tiago José Lemos Monteiro, in a work titled A noiva estava de vermelho: horror e sexualidade em "A mulher que inventou o amor", argued that the film embodies the tensions and ambiguities characteristic of the Boca do Lixo universe, "particularly in its attempt to achieve a kind of 'third way' between the exploitation aesthetic that guided most titles from the Boca, and the artistic proposals considered more sophisticated that various filmmakers managed to undertake." He also stated that, "on the one hand, A mulher que inventou o amor openly appropriates certain stylistic and narrative codes linked to a horrific and melodramatic imaginary; on the other hand, it shows itself willing to challenge these very elements by reframing them from a perspective considerably distinct from that which guided the Boca's more conventional approaches to issues of gender, sexuality, and representation."

The critic Arthur Tuoto said that "in A Mulher que Inventou o Amor, we do not merely observe the virgin transform into someone thirsty for sex—a path of fetishization typical of the erotic imagination—but rather the deconstruction of a romantic ideal, the reordering of active and passive roles through the subversion of the figure of the woman within that configuration." He also noted that the film "establishes a very rare balance between its thematic purpose and its properly dramatic relations. Just as the work invokes an aggressive symbolism in its carnal speculations between desire and sex (the butcher who takes the protagonist's virginity, the restaurant where everyone drinks blood), the film articulates a very powerful dimension of melodrama, with scenes of great directness in their emotional and graphic intentions."
