= Cinedistri =

Brazilian film studio and distributor

Cinedistri was a Brazilian film studio and distributor, created in 1949 by Oswaldo Massaini at Rua do Triunfo, where Boca do Lixo would later be established. The company initially acted only as a distributor of national titles between the year of its foundation and 1953, when it decided to also act in the field of cinematographic production. His star was due to be the film Rua sem sol, a melodrama directed by Alex Viany that ended up being a great commercial failure. Depois disso, a Cinedistri resolved to invest naquilo that used to distribute, or seja, musical or chanchada films. Between 1955 and 1961, the company produced or co-produced 35 films, among which stand out Fuzileiro do amor, Cala a Boca, Etelvina, Absolutamente Certo and Dona Xepa. Nessa phase, a Cinedistri associated on several occasions with filmmakers from Atlântida Cinematográfica and also constituted its own star system, with names such as Ankito, Costinha, Dercy Gonçalves, Grande Otelo, Mazzaropi, Odete Lara, among other national stars.

In the 1960s, Cinedistri resolved to invest in the most popular works, marking a new era in its history, when it produced O Pagador de Promessas, a work of greatest prestige made by the São Paulo company and which won various international awards, among which were in Palme d'or for the best picture in the Cannes Film Festival of 1962, and commercialization for tens of countries around the world. Another super production was Lampião, o Rei do Cangaço, the greatest commercial success of the producer and distributor, which solidified as the main film company in São Paulo in the 1970s. The last outstanding film of the golden period was Independência ou Morte, in 1972. From that date, Cinedistri began a phase of decline, making films with more modest budgets and more popular appeal, the so-called pornochanchadas.

In the following decade, already with financial difficulties, the company closed its cinematographic activities, being replaced by Cinearte, by Aníbal Massaini Neto and Oswaldo Massaini Filho.
