= Yakuza Princess =

Brazilian action thriller film

- Theatrical release poster
- Directed by: Vicente Amorim
- Written by: Fernando Toste; Kimi Howl Lee
- Based on: Samurai Shiro by Danilo Beyruth
- Produced by: Tubaldini Shelling; Andre Skaf
- Starring: Masumi; Jonathan Rhys Meyers; Tsuyoshi Ihara; Eijiro Ozaki
- Cinematography: Gustavo Hadba
- Edited by: Danilo Lemos
- Music by: Lucas Marcier; Fabiano Krieger
- Production companies: Tubaldini Shelling; Andre Skaf; Filmland International
- Distributed by: Magnet Releasing
- Release date: August 2021 (Fantasia Fest)
- Running time: 106 minutes
- Country: Brazil
- Languages: English; Japanese
- Box office: $35,763

Yakuza Princess is a 2021 Brazilian action thriller film directed by Vicente Amorim and written by Fernando Toste and Kimi Howl Lee, based on the graphic novel Samurai Shiro by Danilo Beyruth. The film stars Masumi, Jonathan Rhys Meyers, Tsuyoshi Ihara, Eijiro Ozaki, and Kenny Leu.

== Synopsis ==
The head of a notorious yakuza syndicate is killed in Japan and his only heir is sent to Brazil as a baby. Twenty years later, living in São Paulo, Akemi (Masumi Tsunoda) discovers that she has inherited half of the yakuza clan and that the other half wants her dead. Takeshi (Tsuyoshi Ihara), a mobster loyal to the late boss, comes to Brazil to protect her. At the same time, an amnesiac foreigner (Jonathan Rhys Meyers) wakes up in a hospital and crosses her path. Akemi will start a war and chart her own destiny.

== Cast ==
- Masumi as Akemi
- Jonathan Rhys Meyers as Shiro
- Tsuyoshi Ihara as Takeshi
- Eijiro Ozaki as Kojiro
- Kenny Leu as The Taxi Driver
- Mariko Takai as Mrs. Tsugahara
- Charles Paraventi as Armond
- Toshiji Takeshima as Chiba
- Lucas Oranmian as Perito

== Production ==
In October 2019, it was announced that the singer Masumi will make her big screen debut opposite Jonathan Rhys Meyers in the action film that completed filming in Brazil. On February 10, 2021, it was reported that XYZ Films would sell worldwide rights save Latin America, in the European Film Market, in early March. On April 6, 2021 it was announced that Magnet Releasing has acquired the U.S distribution rights.

== Reception ==
=== Critical response ===
According to critic aggregation site Rotten Tomatoes, the film has a critic score of 33% based on 42 review and an audience of 36% based on 50+ reviews with the critics consensus reading; "visually stylish but a narrative non-starter, Yakuza Princess serves as an unhappy reminder that action is rarely a substitute for an interesting story".
