= Gaijin 2: Love Me as I Am =

2005 film directed by Tizuka Yamasaki

Gaijin 2: Love Me As I Am
- Directed by: Tizuka Yamasaki
- Written by: Tizuka Yamasaki
- Starring: Tamlyn Tomita; Luís Melo; Mariana Ximenes; Eijiro Ozaki; Jorge Perugorría
- Production companies: Ponto Filmes; Scena Filmes
- Release date: September 2, 2005
- Running time: 131 minutes
- Country: Brazil
- Languages: Portuguese; Japanese
- Budget: R$10 million
- Box office: R$388,800 (Brazil only)

Gaijin 2: Love Me As I Am (Portuguese: Gaijin – Ama-me Como Sou) is a 2005 Brazilian drama film directed by Tizuka Yamasaki. It is the sequel of Gaijin: Roads to Freedom (1980), also directed by Yamasaki.

The film is set in 1908 and tells the story of Japanese immigrants who come to work on a coffee plantation in Brazil. There, they will need to adapt to the conditions and exploitations of the farm owners. The film was shot in a scenographic city in Londrina, and in locations of Curitiba, Maringá, Foz do Iguaçu, Paranaguá, and Cambará.

== Plot ==
In 1908 Titoe (Kyoko Tsukamoto) arrives in Brazil, a Japanese coming to the country in attempt to get money from work and then return to Japan to be able to follow her life in the home country. In 1935, now with her daughter Shinobu (Nobu McCarthy, who died in 2002 during filming) born and without enough money to return to Japan, Titoe decides to buy her first plot of land in Londrina.

The Second World War, and its consequences for Japan end up further delaying Titoe's plans to return to the country, especially after Kazumi and Maria (Tamlyn Tomita), her grandchildren were born. Maria marries Gabriel (Jorge Perrugoría), son of a Spanish father and Italian mother, with whom he has two children: Yoko (Lissa Diniz) and Pedro.

The business of Gabriel is going well, until the seizure made by the Collor Government in 1990 leads to bankruptcy. Without alternatives, Maria and the children will live with Titoe while Gabriel embarks to Kobe, intending to work temporarily and raise money for the family.

== Cast ==
- Tamlyn Tomita as Maria Yamashita
- Jorge Perugorría as Gabriel Damazo Bravo Salinas
- Nobu McCarthy (in her final film role) as Shinobu Yamashita
  - Eda Nagayama as Shinobu Yamashita (young)
- Aya Ono as Titoe Yamashita (née Yamada)
  - Kyoko Tsukamoto as Titoe Yamada (young)
- Kissei Kumamoto as Mr. Yamashita / Kazumi
- Luís Melo as Ramon Salina Bravo Salinas
- Zezé Polessa as Gina
- Louise Cardoso as Sofia Damazo Bravo Salinas
- Mariana Ximenes as Weronica Müller
- Lissa Diniz as Yoko Salinas
- Carlos Takeshi as Vicente
- Eijiro Ozaki as Kunihiro
- Felipe Kannenberg as George Müller
- Ken Kaneko as Jiro Kobayashi
- Ryogo Suguimoto as Ken
- Dado Dolabella as Yoko's Friend

== See also ==
- Dirty Hearts, a 2011 Brazilian historical drama-thriller film
