= Louise Cardoso =

Brazilian actress and producer

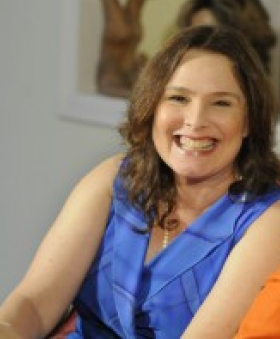
- Louise Cardoso in 2011
- Born: Louise Ferreira Cardoso; 17 April 1955 (age 71); Rio de Janeiro, Brazil
- Occupation: Actress
- Years active: 1976–present
- Partner: Guel Arraes
- Father: Francisco de Assis Stolze Cardoso

Louise Ferreira Cardoso (born 17 April 1955) is a Brazilian actress, producer, and theatre instructor. She is considered a prolific actress, having had a long career in acting through various mediums, including theatre, film, and television.

== Early life ==
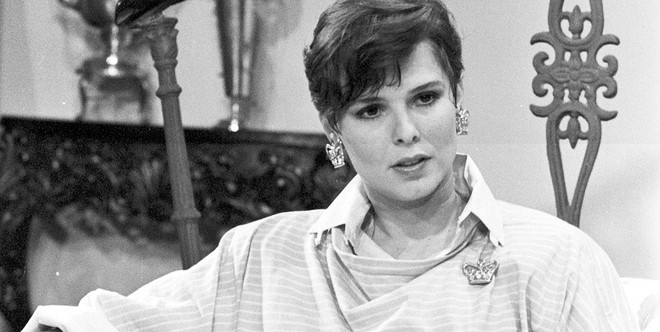
Louise in a scene from the novela Cambalacho (1986) as the villain Daniela.

Louise Cardoso was born on 17 April 1955 in Rio de Janeiro. Francisco de Assis Stolze Cardoso, Louise's father, at one point watched a film starring Maurice Chevalier. Enchanted by the movie's theme, called Louise, he promised himself that he would name his daughter Louise. Louise has one brother, named Wagner, named after the composer whom their father admired. She enjoyed acting in theatres in musicals during her youth. Her mothers' family acted in performances in the city of Santana de Sapucaí, which is now Silvianópolis in the state of Minas Gerais. During her youth she formed a band inspired by The Beatles with her friends called The Snakes, following in the steps of her brother. She attended the Federal University of Rio de Janeiro, majoring in literature, but dropped out six months before her graduation, due in part to her father's advice.

== Career ==
Having been educated at Teatro O Tablado under the direction of Maria Clara Machado, she participated in various award-winning productions. She would later also teach theatre there for 12 years. Among the productions she acted in, they include A Mente Capta, written by Mauro Rasi and directed by Wolf Maya, the Tennessee Williams play A Streetcar Named Desire directed by Maurice Vaneau, Fulaninha e Dona Coisa, by Noemi Marinho, and directed by Marco Nanini, and Velha é a Mãe, directed by João Fonseca and screenplay by Fábio Porchat. She has also acted in various telenovelas, such as Cambalacho, Força de um Desejo, Como uma Onda, Páginas da Vida, Sangue Bom and Além do Tempo. Her greatest success, however, was with TV Pirata, where she played various humorous personalities.

Cardoso began to be responsible for productions at local theatres, where her productions started to gain popularity. She went on to wholly dedicate herself to theatre, where she came upon the Teatro Tabulado and began taking classes with Machado. In 1975, Cardoso took a role in O Dragão, directed by Machado, playing the role of a cat in the play. The piece was translated by Maria Julieta, a daughter of Carlos Drummond de Andrade. Cardoso won an award for new actress for the production.

After Machado became sick, Cardoso became the new educator at the theatre and taught many notable students, including Drica Moraes, Malu Mader, Luís Carlos Tourinho, Maria Padilha, Lúcia Veríssimo, and Patrícia Pillar. In 1976, she left the theatre to participate in Asdrúbal Trouxe o Trombone and work with Ziembinski. They became known for their work O Quarteto, which became controversial for the romantic and sexual scenes between the young Cardoso and much older Ziembinski.

In 1976, she also worked in A Gata Borralheira, by Machado and directed by Maia. The title character was played by Lucélia Santos. In 1979, she acted in A Feira Livre, a play by Plínio Marcos and directed by Emiliano Queiroz, with choreography by Graciela Figueroa. Cardoso was invited by Marco Nanini to take part in Fulaninha and Dona Coisa and ended up becoming one of the producers of the show. It was the first play that she produced, and the theatre played productions of the show for three years.

She celebrated her 30 years in theatre with a rendition of the Bertolt Brecht play Mother Courage and Her Children. There was an installation of the performance in Rio de Janeiro and Brasília, as well as at the Festival de Curitiba. She helped to debut the play O Que é Que Ele Tem in 2018 after reading and coming to really like the book the play is based on.

The book, released in 2016, tells the story of singer Olivia Byington and her son, João, who was born with Apert syndrome. The play includes music by Byington. O Que é Que Ele Tem was the first monologue by the Cardoso.

=== Television ===
Though dismissive of television at first, she first was invited to join productions made by Globo when O Dragão was staged in 1975. She had been inspired by Ziembinski's advice, and he personally brought her to Globo.

She made her debut as the protagonist in Ciranda, Cirandinha (1977), created by Paulo Mendes Campos and directed by Paulo José. Afterwards came the novela Gina, followed by Marrom Glacê, by Cássio Gabus Mendes. She still performs in this novela, in a role that Janete Clair was written specifically for her.

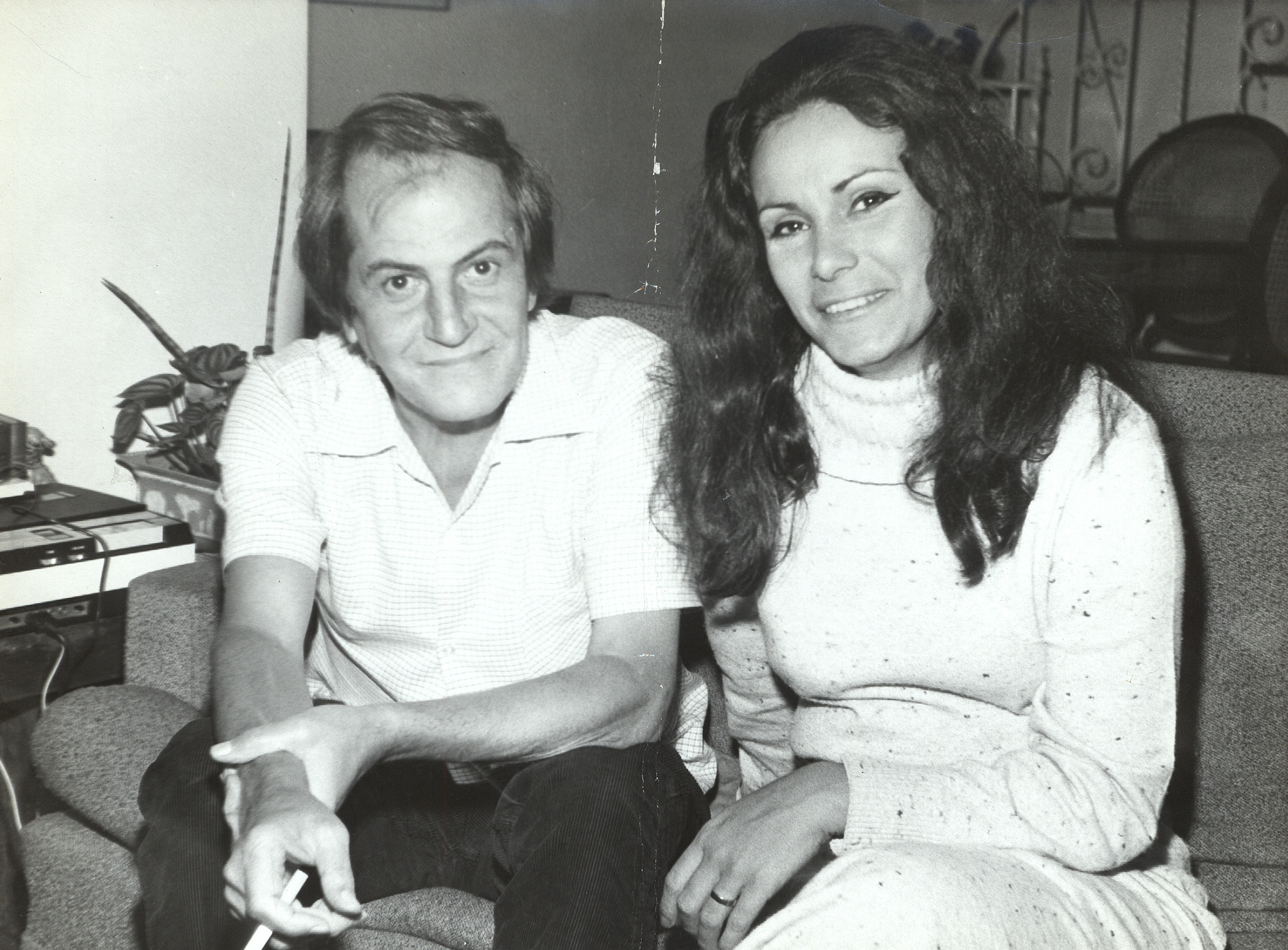
Cardoso in 1971.

She would later act in the comedy show Viva o Gordo for a year and a half. In 1983, she performed in Champanhe, by Cássio Gabus Mendes, her first novela of eight.

In 1984, she participated in the TV Manchete mini-series that was written by Manoel Carlos, where she played the protagonist along with Cláudia Magno and Paulo Castelli. In 1985, she was a part of O Tempo e o Vento, directed by Paulo José. She would later make Tenda dos Milagres, with filming in Salvador, Bahia.

In Cambalacho, in 1986, she was the villain Daniele in the 8th season. She also played the role of Cláudia in the 1990 novela Mico Preto.

In 1992, she acted as Gilda in Deus nos Acuda, written by Sílvio de Abreu and directed by Jorge Fernando, as well as in Felicidade. In 1995, she was professor Laurinha in Cara & Coroa, a novela by Antônio Calmon and directed by Wolf Maia. She also took part in Zazá along with Cecil Thiré. She acted as Guiomar in Força de um Desejo, a novela by Gilberto Braga. She was invited to take part in Porto dos Milagres, written by Aguinaldo Silva and directed by Marcos Paulo and Roberto Naar. In 2004, she was called to work on Como uma Onda, a novela by Walther Negrão.

=== TV Pirata ===
She made her debut with TV Pirata, directed by Guel Arraes in 1988. She was a part of the cast of various humorous personalities. Her most notable role was that of Clotilde, the wife of Barbosa, played by Ney Latorraca. Clotilde and Barbosa would play roles in the satirical novela Fogo no Rabo, a parody of Roda de Fogo. This would become one of Cardoso's most famous roles.

During the show, each cast member would impersonate various actors. Clotilde was inspired in part by actresses Renata Sorrah and Natália do Vale. Other notable characters include Wanda, inspired by Marilyn Monroe, and Isabelle Ruffon de Montpellier, alongside the character Tonhão, played by Cláudia Raia.

She left in 1990, along with Cláudia Raia. They were replaced by Maria Zilda Bethlem and Denise Fraga. Cardoso returned with Arraes the year after. However, the program was taken off the air without explanation not too long after.

TV Pirata would return to air in April 1992 with monthly episodes about specific themes. The last episode aired on 8 December 1992.

=== Film ===
Cardoso made her film debut in 1976 as Margarida in O Seminarista, based on the book of the same name by Bernardo Guimarães, and as a student in Marcados para Viver. The year after, she played roles such as Laurinha in Se Segura, Malandro! and Cecília in Gente Fina É Outra Coisa. In 1978, she participated in the short film Alô, Teteia, ending the decade as part of the cast of O Coronel e o Lobisomem, directed by Alcino Diniz. She also made a guest appearance on Parceiros de Aventura.

During the 1980s, she was a member of the team at Cabaret Mineiro, along with participating in the films Teu Tua as Celinha and Gaijin – Os Caminhos da Liberdade as Angelina. In 1981, she was on the cast of O Sonho não Acabou as the singer of "Meu Pai", along with performing as Carol. The year after, she worked alongside comedians Renato Aragão, Dedé Santana, Mussum and Zacarias in Os Vagabundos Trapalhões and Os Trapalhões na Serra Pelada as Loló and Lilian, respectively. In 1983, foi she was a member of the team at Bar Esperança as Nina Saraiva, and later was in A Próxima Vítima by João Batista de Andrade, alongside Antônio Fagundes.

Her most well known role would come in 1986 with the film Baixo Gávea as the lesbian actress Ana. For her role, she was awarded Best Actress by the Festival de Brasília. The year after, she was in the spotlight again, this time for her role as the protagonist in Leila Diniz, playing the homonymous character. She was awarded the same reward again for the second year in a row. Along with these, she acted in Urubus e Papagaios as Inês and Sonhos de Menina-Moça, directed by Teresa Trautman, playing Beatriz. She was awarded the Best Supporting Actress in Film award at the Prêmio APCA. She ended the decade by playing in the short film Por Dúvida das Vias.

The 1990s were relatively light in terms of the roles she played, as she only performed as Renata in Matou a Família e Foi ao Cinema. She also made a guest appearance in Miramar and was a member of the cast of For All – O Trampolim da Vitória. In 2001, she acted as a young Salma in Copacabana and, two years later in Gaijin – Ama-me como Sou as Sofia Damazo, along with the short film O Ovo. In 2006, she was in the romance film 1972 and, three years after that, ended the decade as Clarissa in Tempos de Paz and Rosa in Do Começo ao Fim.

In the 2010s, she acted in Muita Calma Nessa Hora, as well as in O Diário de Tati. In 2014, she portrayed Sônia in the short film Tempos Idos, and ending este decênio quatro anos depois na pele de Marlize em Uma Quase Dupla.

=== Leila ===
Cardoso played the role of Leila Diniz in the 1987 film of the same name. It was directed by Luis Carlos Lacerda, who invited her to take part in the production. The actress who initially was invited Tássia Camargo, was pregnant and thus was unable to shoot on set. Cardoso was given Diniz's diaries by her mother and talked with her close friends and sisters. Her preparation lasted 6 months and recordings lasted two months.

=== Personal life ===
Cardoso fell in love with fellow actor Carlos Alberto Riccelli while on the set of Leila Diniz, but nothing came of the infatuation as they were both married by that point.

She never was married beyond what was on paper, as her father had actively discouraged such during her youth. She has dated, among others, Guel Arraes, businessman Ricardo Aranovich, and lived together with Belgian photographer Jean Louis. She later dated Filipe Tenreiro, who directed A Rosa Tatuada, and Fernando Philbert while he participated in Zazá.

== Filmography ==
=== Television ===
Year	Title	Role	Notes
1978	Ciranda, Cirandinha	Tetê	Episode: "Toma que o Filho é Teu"
1978	Gina	Helena	
1979	Marron Glacê	Vânia	
1981	Viva o Gordo		Comedic role/participation
1983	Champagne	Anita	
1984	Viver a Vida	Marly	Episode: "09 de outubro – 20 de novembro"
1985	O Tempo e o Vento	Bibiana Terra Cambará (young)	2nd phase
1985	Tenda dos Milagres	Augusta	
1986	Cambalacho	Daniela Fernandes (Daniela Furtado)	
1988	O Primo Basílio	Joana	
1988	TV Pirata	Various roles	Comedic role
1988	O Dia Mais Quente do Ano		Year end special
1990	Mico Preto	Cláudia	
1991	Felicidade	Madalena	Special participation
1992	Deus nos Acuda	Gilda	
1992	Despedida de Solteiro	Sugarette	Episode: "01 de julho"
1993	Você Decide	Luelen	Episode: "Anjos Marginais"
1995	Engraçadinha	Florist	
1995	A Comédia da Vida Privada	Alaíde	Episode: "Pais e Filhos"
1995	A Comédia da Vida Privada	Carmen	Episode: "O Pesadelo da Casa Própria"
1995	Cara & Coroa	Laura Del Rey Villar (Laurinha)	
1997	Zazá	Mercedes Hildalgo	
1998	Mulher	Judite	Episode: "Repulsa"
1999	O Belo e as Feras	Sônia	Episode: "Azar no Jogo, Pior no Amor"
1999	Força de um Desejo	Guiomar	
2001	A Grande Família	Beatriz	Episode: "Cada Caso é um Caso"
2001	Porto dos Milagres	Maria Leontina Proença	
2002	Papo Irado	Isadora Duarte (Isa)	Fantástico frame
2004	A Diarista	Vera Palheta	Episode: "Será Que Ela É?"
2004	Sob Nova Direção	Dra. Tânia	Episode: "Fale com Ele"
2004	Como uma Onda	Idalina	
2005	Alma Gêmea	Doralice (guest appearance)	
2005	A Grande Família	Vilma	Episode: "Eu, Eu Mesma e Lineu"
2006	JK	Luisinha Negrão	Episode: "1–15"
2006	Páginas da Vida	Diana Salles Martins de Andrade	
2008	Faça sua História	Verônica	Episode: "O Último Casal Feliz"
2009	Malhação	Filomena Fontes (Tia Filó)	Season 16
2011	Insensato Coração	Sueli Brito Amboim	
2011	A Mulher Invisível	Ema Fachetti	Episode: "22 de novembro"
2012	A Grande Família	Marlene	Episode: "A Rosa Púrpura do Bairro"
2012	Doce de Mãe	Elaine de Souza	
2013	Sangue Bom	Salma Macedo Rabello	
2014	Doce de Mãe	Elaine de Souza	
2015	Além do Tempo	Gema de Luca	
2015	Além do Tempo	Gema Queiroz	
2016–17	Malhação	Irene Soares de Oliveira	Season 24
2023	B.O	Aparecida Ribeiro	

=== Film ===
Year	Title	Role	Notes
1976	O Seminarista	Margarida	
1976	Marcados para Viver	student	
1977	Se Segura, Malandro!	Laurinha	
1977	Gente Fina É Outra Coisa	Cecília	
1978	Alô, Tetéia		Short film
1979	O Coronel e o Lobisomem	Dona Bebel de Melo	
1979	Parceiros da Aventura		
1980	Cabaret Mineiro		
1980	Teu Tua		Segment: "O Corno Imaginário"
1980	Gaijin: Roads to Freedom	Angelina	
1981	O Sonho não Acabou	Carol	
1982	Os Vagabundos Trapalhões	Loló	
1982	Os Trapalhões na Serra Pelada	Lilian	
1983	Bar Esperança	Nina	
1983	A Próxima Vítima	Tereza	
1986	Baixo Gávea	Ana / Mário de Sá Carneiro	
1987	Urubus e Papagaios		
1987	Sonhos de Menina-Moça	Beatriz	
1987	Leila Diniz	Leila Diniz	
1988	Por Dúvida das Vias		Short film
1989	O Escurinho do Cinema	Vera Lúcia	
1991	Killed the Family and Went to the Movies	Renata	
1996	Quem Matou Pixote?		
1997	Miramar	mother	
1997	For All - O Trampolim da Vitória		
2000	O Barato É Ser Careta		Short film
2001	Copacabana	Salma (young)	
2002	Gaijin 2: Love Me as I Am	Sofia Damazo Bravo Salinas	
2003	Apolônio Brasil, o Campeão da Alegria	Milu	
2003	O Ovo		Short film
2006	1972	Dona Iracy	
2006	Irma Vap – O Retorno	Mara	
2007	Corpo		
2007	O Tablado e a Maria Clara Machado	Herself	Documentary
2009	Peacetime	Clarissa	
2009	From Beginning to End	Rosa	
2010	Muita Calma Nessa Hora	Dirce Matos	
2012	O Diário de Tati	Isadora Duarte (Isa)	
2014	Tempos Idos	Sônia	Short film
2015	A Saga da Alma de um Poeta		
2018	Uma Quase Dupla	Marlize	
2020	Just Another Christmas	Teodora	
2022	45 do Segundo Tempo	Soninha	
2023	Pérola	Tia Norma	
2023	Aunt Virginia	Valquíria	
2024	O Clube das Mulheres de Negócios	Brasília	

== Theatre ==
- 2018 – O Que é Que Ele Tem?
- 2016 – A Reunificação das duas Coreias
- 2011 – Velha é a Mãe!
- 2007 – Mother Courage and Her Children – Anna Fierling, Mother Courage
- 2003 – Pluft, o Fantasminha
- 2003 – O Accidente
- 2002 – Sylvia – Sylvia (a cachorrinha)
- 2000 – A Rosa Tatuada
- 1997 – A Capital Federal
- 1997 – Salve Amizade
- 1994 – Navalha na Carne
- 1993 – Fulaninha e Dona Coisa
- 1986 – A Divina Chanchada
- 1985 – A Streetcar Named Desire
- 1983 – Cloud Nine (Numa Nice)
- 1983 – Besame Mucho
- 1982 – A Mente Capta
- 1981 – O Beijo da Louca
- 1981 – Village
- 1979 – Feira Livre
- 1978 – As Cigarras e as Formigas
- 1977 – Beco de Brecht

== Awards and nominations ==
Year	Award	Category	Nomination	Result	Ref
1983	Prêmio Mambembe	Best Actress	Besame Mucho	Nominated	
1986	Candango Trophy of the Festival de Brasília	Best Actress	Baixo Gávea	Won	
1987	Candango Trophy of the Festival de Brasília	Best Actress	Leila Diniz	Won	
1989	Associação Paulista de Críticos de Arte Trophy (APCA)	Best Supporting Actress on TV	O Primo Basílio	Won	
1990	Associação Paulista de Críticos de Arte Trophy (APCA)	Best Supporting Actress in Film	Sonhos de Menina-Moça	Won	
2003	Maria Clara Machado Children's Theatre Prize	Best Supporting Actress	Pluft, o Fantasminha	Nominated	
2018	Nelson Rodrigues Trophy	Theatre	O Que É Que Ela Tem?	Won	
2023	Los Angeles Brazilian Film Festival	Best Supporting Actress	Aunt Virginia	Won	
2024	Festival Sesc Melhores Filmes	Best National Actress	Aunt Virginia	Pending	
