= Gaijin: Roads to Freedom =

1980 film directed by Tizuka Yamasaki

- Directed by: Tizuka Yamasaki
- Written by: Tizuka Yamasaki; Jorge Durán
- Starring: Kyoko Tsukamoto; Antônio Fagundes; Jiro Kawarazaki; Gianfrancesco Guarnieri; Álvaro Freire
- Cinematography: Edgar Moura
- Edited by: Vera Freire; Lael Rodrigues
- Music by: John Neschling
- Production company: Ponto Filmes
- Distributed by: Embrafilme
- Release date: May 1980 (Cannes Film Festival)
- Running time: 112 minutes
- Country: Brazil
- Languages: Portuguese; Japanese

Gaijin: Roads to Freedom (Portuguese: Gaijin – Caminhos da Liberdade), also known as Gaijin, a Brazilian Odyssey, is a 1980 Brazilian drama film, the debut film of director Tizuka Yamasaki.

The film is based on real events in the history of Japanese immigrants who came to Brazil in search of better opportunities. Its sequel, Gaijin 2: Love Me As I Am, was released on September 2, 2005.

== Plot ==
Japan, 1908. Motivated by poverty in the country and few job prospects, many Japanese have emigrated in search of opportunities. As the emigration company only accepted family groups who had at least a couple, Yamada (Jiro Kawarazaki) and Kobayashi (Keniti Kaneko) who were brothers, see as solution that Yamada would marry Titoe (Kyoko Tsukamoto), who was only 16 years old. Yamada and Titoe had just met and, along with a cousin, they depart to Brazil. After 52 days of travel they finally arrive in Brazil where they will work in Santa Rosa farm, in São Paulo, where the coffee expansion was intense. But they stumble upon a foreman who handles settlers with hostility, demanding them to work to exhaustion. In addition their wages are stolen by the owners of the farm, only being treated with respect by other settlers and by Tonho (Antônio Fagundes), the accountant of the farm.

== Cast ==
- Kyoko Tsukamoto as Titoe
- Antônio Fagundes as Tonho
- Jiro Kawarazaki as Yamada
- Ken Kaneko as Kobayashi
- Gianfrancesco Guarnieri as Enrico
- Álvaro Freire as Chico Santos
- Louise Cardoso as Angelina
- José Dumont as Ceará
- Yuriko Oguri as Mrs. Nakano
- Clarisse Abujamra as Felícia
- Carlos Augusto Strazzer as Dr. Heitor
- Dorothy Leirner as Grazziela
- Maiku Kozonoi as Keniti Nakano
