= Independência ou Morte (film) =

- Directed by: Carlos Coimbra
- Written by: Abilo Perreira de Almeida; Dionísio Azevedo; Carlos Coimbra; Anselmo Duarte; Lauro César Muniz
- Produced by: Anibal Massaini Neto
- Starring: Tarcísio Meira; Glória Menezes; Dionísio Azevedo; Kate Hansen; Maria Cláudia
- Cinematography: Carlos Coimbra
- Edited by: Campello Neto
- Music by: Chico Moraes; Wilson Miranda
- Distributed by: Cinedistri
- Release date: September 2, 1972
- Running time: 108 minutes
- Country: Brazil
- Language: Portuguese

Independência ou Morte (in English: Independence or Death) is a Brazilian Historical drama film directed by Carlos Coimbra and released on September 2, 1972. is based on the life of Emperor Pedro I of Brazil and Empress Maria Leopoldina of Austria, as well as other facts about the Independence of Brazil, is starring Tarcísio Meira, Glória Menezes, Kate Hansen and Dionísio Azevedo.

At the time of its premiere, around 2,924,494 people saw it, being the most watched film in that year and one in the history of Brazilian cinema.

== Plot ==
An interviewer begins to interview José Bonifácio who was by the Emperor's side all the time, he begins to tell everything, Pedro was always friendly with other children even though his mother and father prevented him because he was from the royalty, belonging to the Portuguese royal family and for being the Inheritor Viceroy of the Viceroyalty of Brazil, Over time the child Pedro would grow up to his perfect age, his father King John VI of Portugal due to his age he would inherit the throne of the Kingdom of Brazil to Pedro and would be crowned as King of Brazil, at the same time he would meet Maria Leopoldina of Austria with whom he would marry and become the Queen Consort of Brazil, while in the Masonic Palace in Rio de Janeiro, the Freemasons began to organize plans for an independence revolt against the Portuguese, due to the neglect of the Colony and the other Independences carried out by the Spanish colonies.

Over time, Pedro would know about the Freemasons and would join them voluntarily although he would do so completely in private, without anyone else knowing, and he would continue to be King of Brazil. As time passed until 1822, the uprisings would begin, commanded by Pedro against the Portuguese, in the end the news would reach him about what the Portuguese jury would do, knowing it, the Portuguese orders him, in fury, he would give a speech to his troops and then the Cry of Ipiranga, after this the Empire would be proclaimed and Pedro I would be crowned as Emperor of Brazil while the Kingdom would be dissolved and at the same time it would be the end of Brazil as a Portuguese Colony, Due to the war he was leading, he would begin to neglect his relationship with his wife, which over time would begin to suffer from an illness. The last year of fighting against the Portuguese army, the news about the birth of his son would reach him and he would leave the battlefield to go see the birth of his son, during the birth of the baby the Empress Leopoldina would be affected even that the baby would be born in good condition, after this Pedro would return to the battlefield to continue leading the troops even though at that moment the weak empress would die, and the news would reach the battlefield where Emperor Pedro would be devastated by the news, After finally having defeated the Portuguese, he would return to Rio, even though not with the motivation of before, and he and the Marchioness of Santos would take care of little Pedro de Alcántara. The depression would begin to affect the emperor, which would lead him to neglect his son and the affairs of the Empire, which would lead him to the decision to go into exile in Portugal.

Bonifácio's interviewer gave his opinion about the figure of Pedro, due to having gone from being a Liberal to being an Absolutist, having reigned twice, being an adorable father and unfaithful husband, Bonifacio would tell him that despite having been all that, Emperor Pedro consolidated the vast empire and guaranteed Brazilian independence, as well as having left Brazil free as a Portuguese colony, then finally, Pedro and others related to him would go by boat into exile to Portugal, saying goodbye to Bonifacio and 5-years-old Pedro de Alcántara.

== Cast ==
- Tarcísio Meira as Pedro I of Brazil
  - Tarcísio Filho as Pedro I (child)
- Kate Hansen as Maria Leopoldina of Austria
- Dionísio Azevedo as José Bonifácio de Andrada
- Glória Menezes as Domitila de Castro, Marchioness of Santos
- Manuel de Nóbrega as John VI of Portugal
- Heloísa Helena as Carlota Joaquina of Spain
- Emiliano Queiroz as Francisco Gomes da Silva
- Anselmo Duarte as Joaquim Gonçalves Ledo
- Jairo Arco e Flexa as Lieutenant Canto e Mello
- Abílio Pereira de Almeida as José Clemente Pereira
- Maria Cláudia as Amélie of Leuchtenberg
- Francisco Di Franco as Plácido
- José Lewgoy as João Pinto
- Macedo Neto as Francisco Vilela Barbosa
- Antônio Patiño as Martim Francisco Ribeiro de Andrada
- Marcelo Maduar as Younger-Pedro II
