= Pornochanchada =

Genre of sex comedy films produced in Brazil

Pornochanchada (Portuguese pronunciation: [poʁnoʃɐ̃ˈʃadɐ]) is a genre of sex comedy films (chanchada means a kind of light comedy, a burlesque) produced in Brazil that was popular from the late 1960s, following the popularity of commedia sexy all'italiana. By the 1980s, with the wide availability of hardcore pornography through clandestine video cassettes, the genre suffered a considerable decline. The name, combined pornô (porn) and chanchada (light comedy), which itself combined comedy and erotica.

== Background ==
Due to a confluence of economic and cultural factors, particularly with the liberation of customs, it produced a new trend in the film field, questioning customs and exploring erotica. As a typical cultural product of Brazil, pornochanchada achieved great commercial success in the country throughout the 1970s, despite the low cost of its productions, mainly made in Boca do Lixo.

The genre was heavily influenced by popular Italian comedies, especially those of an erotic nature, as well as the reinterpretation of the Rio de Janeiro tradition of popular urban comedy and the insinuating eroticism of São Paulo films from the late 1960s. Although the label was used indiscriminately, whether for poorly finished or well-crafted works, pornochanchada was characterized by the development of scripts emphasizing erotic situations, innuendos, jokes, and a priority focus on female anatomy, a film formula that quickly captured large segments of the Brazilian market. Combining titles with double meanings, the plots often revolved around themes such as virginity, romantic conquest, and adultery, among others.

For many of its critics, pornochanchada films were considered vulgar and crude, taking advantage of the strict control over cultural production and information during the Brazilian military dictatorship. More conservative and moralistic sectors of society even organized campaigns against the screening of these films, and hundreds of them were heavily censored by federal censors. Others argued that the genre led a significant market phase for Brazilian cinema in the mid-1970s. One notable film of the genre is Lady on the Bus, which is the fourth highest-grossing film in the history of Brazilian cinema, with 6.5 million viewers. This genre (alongside erotic drama) is responsible for the phrase "Brazilian cinema is just about sex."

The decline of pornochanchada came in the early next decade, due to both its thematic exhaustion and the rise of hardcore pornography, which put an end to the genre's roughly 15-year existence as a popular genre.

== History ==
=== Early days ===
According to the Enciclopédia do Cinema Brasileiro (Encyclopedia of Brazilian Cinema), pornochanchada began with the films Os paqueras (directed by Reginaldo Faria), Memórias de um gigolô (directed by Alberto Pieralisi), and Adultério à brasileira (directed by Pedro Carlos Rovai), which were produced in Rio de Janeiro. Between 1969 and 1972, in what can be considered the genre's first production phase, pornochanchada featured experienced producers and directors who made erotic comedies focusing on the cast, efficient direction, and script conception (including authors such as Lauro César Muniz and Oduvaldo Viana Filho).

=== Rise and peak ===
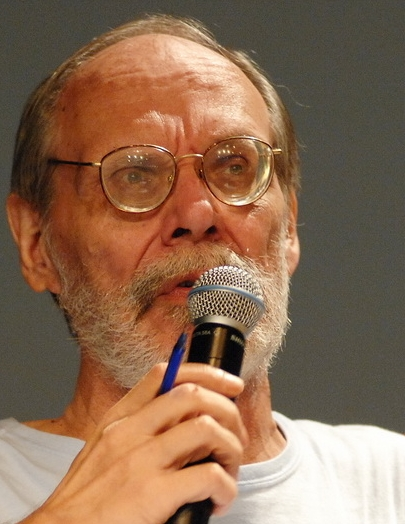
Director Carlos Reichenbach specialized in more experimental productions.

However, it was in a second phase that the genre gained fertile ground and consolidated itself, starting in the region of Luz (Note: The Luz neighborhood historically concentrated the offices of national and foreign producers, exhibitors, and distributors.) and more specifically in an area that became known as Boca do Lixo. With the emergence of new directors and an increasingly diverse and considerable film production, including some works that displayed recognized qualities, pornochanchada represented a golden age in terms of the Brazilian film market between 1972 and 1978. Among the top 25 box office hits from 1970 to 1975, nine were pornochanchada films, led by the record-breaking A Viúva Virgem (directed by Pedro Carlos Rovai).

During this phase, several subgenres emerged within the pornochanchada, with titles exploring drama, crime, horror, western, and even experimental, in addition to those that intensified their comedic or erotic sides. Directors such as Carlos Reichenbach, Ody Fraga, Roberto Mauro, Fauzi Mansur, Jean Garret, Cláudio Cunha, José Miziara, and Silvio de Abreu, among others, emerged, as well as filmmakers like cinematographers Cláudio Portioli and Antônio Meliande, editor Eder Mazzini, and screenwriter Rajá de Aragão, in addition to the production companies Servicine (owned by Alfredo Palácios and A. P. Galante) and Cinedistri (owned by Osvaldo Massaini).

Thanks to its ability to maintain a sufficiently large audience to sustain the genre's continuity at the box office, pornochanchada fostered a harmonious relationship between producers, distributors, and exhibitor groups (many of which were associated with the producers), which differed from previous periods in Brazilian cinema, except for the chanchada era in the 1950s. It achieved various commercial successes in the Brazilian film market, despite the objections of moralistic segments of society and critics of censorship, who were scandalized by its impolite manners and dubious taste. There were numerous reasons for loud campaigns in civil society and the National Congress, in addition to the Federal Censorship having banned scenes from hundreds of pornochanchada films.

Other entities bothered by pornochanchada were large American distributors, unhappy with the large number of national titles and the successful acquisition of a share of the domestic market. In terms of occupying the national market, Brazilian films accounted for 30% of tickets sold in the country, which corresponded to around 120 million tickets.

Led by Boca do Lixo, which was responsible for producing about two-thirds of Brazilian films on average annually in the 1970s, pornochanchada managed to create a kind of modest yet dynamic Brazilian star system, even without the support of advertising schemes and television networks. It launched actresses such as Nicole Puzzi, Zaira Bueno, Vera Fischer, Matilde Mastrangi, Aldine Muller, Adele Fátima, Monique Lafond, Zilda Mayo, and Xuxa Meneghel, or it seduced already known actresses such as Sandra Brea, Maria Lúcia Dahl, Adriana Prieto, Lucélia Santos, Lídia Brondi, and Ira de Furstenberg. Among the actors, a prominent name was David Cardoso, who was also a frequent producer.

=== Decline and end ===
In the early 1980s, pornochanchada was already showing signs of aesthetic and economic exhaustion. Its decline as a film genre coincided with the economic crisis that hit Brazil during that period, drastically affecting the decline in audience attendance for both national and foreign films in the country's cinemas.

Simultaneously, with the dominance of hardcore pornography from the United States in the Brazilian market, which previously belonged to pornochanchada films. Facing foreign competition, Brazilian producers hesitated but eventually embraced the production of explicit sex films, with the milestone being Coisas eróticas (directed by Raffaele Rossi). The success of the first Brazilian pornographic film, with an audience of over 4 million viewers in Brazil, gave impetus to the production of new domestic films. Some professionals from Boca do Lixo associated themselves with the Brazilian hardcore wave, albeit under pseudonyms, such as Alfredo Sternheim, Álvaro Moya, Antônio Meliande, David Cardoso, José Mojica Marins, Ody Fraga, among others. Most of the well-known pornochanchada actresses declined to participate in hardcore films, and the few who agreed were "doubled" in explicit sex scenes.

With lower production costs and poorer quality than pornochanchada, explicit sex films dominated a significant portion of the market, with considerable production by national standards. In 1984 alone, 69 out of 105 Brazilian films shown in São Paulo cinemas were hardcore pornographic films. This marked the last stage of film production in Boca do Lixo and the melancholic end of pornochanchada.

== Bibliography ==
- Abreu, Nuno C. Enciclopédia do Cinema Brasileiro (organizers: Fernão Ramos and Luiz Felipe Miranda). 2nd ed. São Paulo: Senac, 2004, pp. 431–433. ISBN 85-7359-093-9
- Simões, Inimá F. Sexo à brasileira (in Portuguese). Revista Alceu. v.8 n.15. PUC-RJ, July-December 2007, pp. 185-195.
- Ventura, M. Nos 30 anos do pornô brasileiro, 'Coisas eróticas' ganha livros e filme (in Portuguese). O Globo. Rio de Janeiro, September 2, 2012.
- 'Coisas Eróticas' desafiou a censura durante o regime militar (in Portuguese). Folha.com. São Paulo, January 15, 2014.
- Cinema: a influência negada (in Portuguese). O Estado de S.Paulo. São Paulo, July 1, 1979.
