= Eijiro Ozaki =

Japanese actor

Eijiro Ozaki (尾崎英二郎; born 31 March 1969) is a Japanese actor. To English-speaking audiences he is known for playing Lieutenant Okubo in Letters from Iwo Jima, Kaito Nakamura as a younger man in Heroes Season 2, Admiral Inokuchi in The Man in the High Castle Seasons 3 & 4, and Lord Kuroda Nobuhisa in Shōgun (2024 TV series).

== Career ==
=== 1990s ===
At the age of 20, he spent one year at the University of Nebraska–Lincoln as an exchange student. That was when he had his first acting experience in front of the cameras for an American televised educational program and gave him hint of his potential as an actor.

He made his first professional stage debut in 1994 playing Jim, the lead role in Rebel Without A Cause, performed entirely in English, and dived into his full-time acting career. He started learning Sanford Meisner's techniques under Yoko Narahashi at the United Performers' Studio, Tokyo in 1994. In 1995, he was coached by Frank Corsaro, a former Actors Studio, New York artistic director, in his drama training.

In 1997, he was singled out to play opposite a popular actress in the National Television drama series Agri. This TV debut gave him more chances to appear in the New Year special drama Uesugi Yozan (1998) and the prime time historical epic Genroku Ryoran (1999).

His breakthrough came as Lt. Yamamoto in the Elle Company production The Winds Of God, one of Japan's most popular straight plays. In 1998, the play was performed for one month at the Judith Anderson Theater, on Off-Off-Broadway in New York. In 1999, the troop went on the National Tour in Japan and gave a 2-month run in New York again at the American Place Theater on Off Broadway. With its total estimated viewing audience of nearly 40,000, The Winds Of God became an excellent opportunity for Ozaki to gain maximum exposure to theater fans. Playing the 3rd lead role, Lieutenant Yamamoto, a Kamikaze pilot. Ozaki showed his potential in both comedy and tragedy. Then he won acclaim by New York critics in 5 reviews of papers and magazines such as The New Yorker, Daily News, Newsday and more.

=== 2000s ===
In 2003, he appeared in Warner Bros.' period epic The Last Samurai. Ozaki was marked by the film's stunt coordinator Nick Powell and selected as one of the Battle Corps (Battle Core) actors. Battle Core was composed of the best 100 Japanese actors possessing accurate swordplay technique, for the key battle sequences set in the mountains of Japanese war fields. Ozaki performed as a High Ranking Samurai of Katsumoto (Ken Watanabe)'s troop in the last great sword-wielding charge against forces armed with the first Western weapons of mass destruction. After this production, he earned his membership in Taurus World Stunt Awards Academy.

The film project, in which he literally devoted his life, was the most prominent one to date in his filmography.

It is Warner Bros.' Iwo jima battle epic Letters From Iwo Jima, directed by Academy Award winner Clint Eastwood and produced by Steven Spielberg (DreamWorks) starring Ken Watanabe.

Besides Watanabe, only 7 actors were selected from the mainland of Japan as his supporting roles. Ozaki received the honor to be one of the 7 principal actors. He played as Lieutenant Okubo, Baron Nishi's deputy, who takes the lead of the men, when Nishi dies in a battle. Okubo's courage sacrifices his life to save his troop in the crossfire against the US Marines.

The film won numerous awards including an Academy Award for Best Sound Editing, Golden Globe Award for Best Picture in Foreign Language and National Board of Review's Best Film of The Year.

After Ozaki moved his base to the US in 2007, he landed the guest star role in NBC TV series Heroes, Young Kaito Nakamura, father of Hiro Nakamura, in 1977. Young Kaito stops Adam Monroe (David Anders) who tries to unleash a virus that could kill billions of innocent people.

In 2011, he played Mr. Sato in Lil Tokyo Reporter, a 1930s period film about Civil Rights Activist Sei Fujii, played by Academy Award-Winner Chris Tashima. The film received over 20 festival awards, and was presented at several U.S. Embassies around the globe.

2015 through 2016, Metanoia Films' Little Boy opened nationally in the US, Mexico, Japan and worldwide. The film won 2016 Premios Luminus Awards' Best Picture, Best Director, Best Young Actor.

2017 through 2019, he landed a recurring guest star role, Admiral Inokuchi in The Man in the High Castle season 3 and 4. Also played as Ishirō Honda in DC's Legends of Tomorrow and as Old Night in The OA. Other TV credits include a Chief scientist in Extant, a Hydra prisoner in Marvel's Agents of S.H.I.E.L.D., and Touch, How I Met Your Mother, FlashForward, The Game.

He played as a young Yakuza boss, Kojiro in film Yakuza Princess, directed by Vicente Amorim entirely shot in Brazil. Voiced two roles: General Kato and young detective Hiroshi in animation Hit-Monkey, directed by Josh Gordon and Will Speck.

He recently played as Lord Kuroda Nobuhisa in the Emmy Awards winning drama series Shōgun (2024 TV series) 1st season, Episode 6 directed by Hiromi Kamata shot in Vancouver, Canada in 2024. He also landed a lead guest star role, Chef Yasuda in High Potential season 2 on ABC in 2026.

== Filmography ==
=== Film roles ===
Title	Role	Notes
Yakuza Princess	Kojiro	
Orbital Christmas	Hiroki Yamamoto	
Little Boy	Masao Kume	
Masterless	Demon	
Fukai Mori	The Writer	
Lil Tokyo Reporter	Mr. Sato	
Gakko Wo Tsukuro (Let's Build A University)	Tetsuomi Tani	
Blood Ties	Joe	
The Hirosaki Players	Tsubasa	Short film
The 8th Samurai	Nanshu	
Letters From Iwo Jima	Lieutenant Okubo	
The Last Samurai	Sword Stunt performer	
Gaijin – Love Me As I Am	Kunihiro	
Born to Be King	Yakuza	
Garo no Okite	Koike	
Great Jail Break	Goto	
Infinity	Alan (voice)	

=== Television roles ===
Title	Role	Episodes
High Potential	Chef Yasuda	1 episode
Shōgun (2024 TV series)	Lord Kuroda Nobuhisa	1 episode
Hit-Monkey	General Kato, Hiroshi	3 episodes
The OA	Old Night	1 episode
Legends of Tomorrow	Ishirō Honda	Episode: "Tagumo Attacks!!!"
The Man in the High Castle	Admiral Inokuchi	9 episodes Season 3, 4
The Gorburger Show	Various roles	8 episodes
Heroes Reborn	Kaiju Bandit, Japanese Newscaster (voice)	2 episodes
Agents of S.H.I.E.L.D.	Hydra Prisoner	Episode: "The Things We Bury"
Extant	Chief Scientist	1 episode
Touch	Japanese Businessman	1 episode
Wedding Band	Tokyo Tourist	1 episode
How I Met Your Mother	Ninja	1 episode
FlashForward	Jiro	1 episode
The Game	Maitre D'	1 episode
Heroes	Young Kaito Nakamura	1 episode
Haru and Natsu	Kunio Takakura	2 episodes
Genroku Ryoran	Tamura's samurai	1 episode
Yozan Uesugi	Uesugi's samurai	
Agri	Kenichi Kimura	3 episodes
Shuriken	3rd prisoner	

=== Video games roles ===
Title	Role	Notes
Syndicate	Agent Tatsuo Hamilton	
The Chronicles of Riddick: Assault on Dark Athena	Yoto	
Dead Rising 3	Harry "Zhi" Wong	

== Stage ==
Location	Title	Notes
The American Place Theatre, New York	The Winds of God	
The Judith Anderson Theatre, New York	The Winds of God	
Japan National Tour	The Winds of God	
West Japan Tour	The Winds of God	
Shavian Theater Company, NZ	Shuriken	
Theater V Akasaka, Japan	Dog Day Afternoon	
Model Language Studio, Japan	Rebel Without a Cause	

== Awards ==
In 2013, Best Supporting Actor Award for his role in short film Lil Tokyo Reporter at Asians On Film Festival – Winter Award

In 2009, Best Actor Award for his role in AFI Production short The 8th Samurai at Show Off Your Shorts Film Festival, USA.

The film also won Best of Fest Award at LA Shorts Fest 2009.
