= O Crime de Cravinhos =

1920 film directed by Arturo Carrari

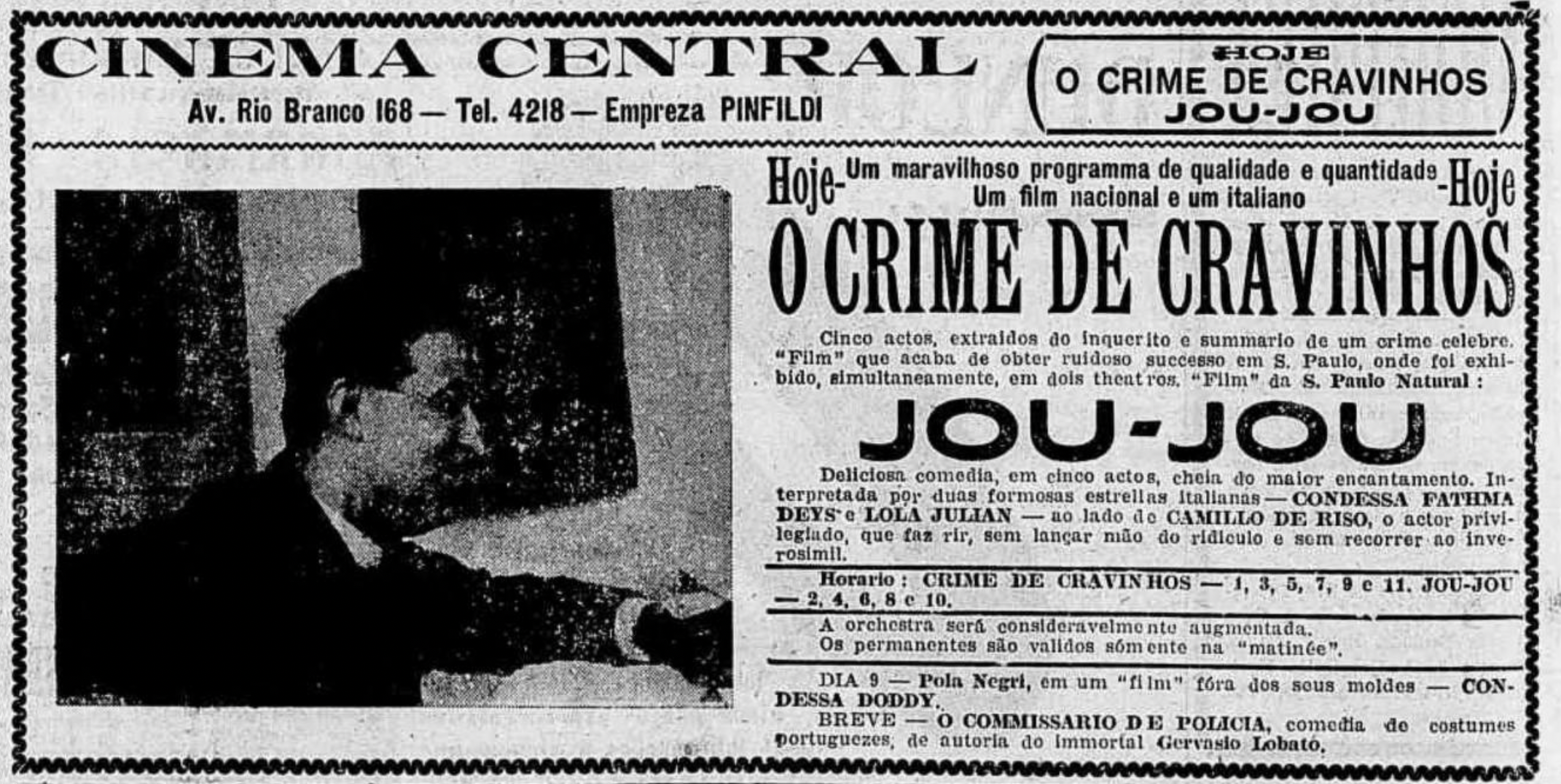
- Directed by: Arturo Carrari
- Written by: Arturo Carrari
- Produced by: Arturo Carrari, Gilberto Rossi, Fiorini Silva
- Cinematography: Gilberto Rossi
- Distributed by: São Paulo Natural Filmes
- Release date: 25 November 1920
- Country: Brazil
- Language: Silent

O Crime de Cravinhos is a 1920 Brazilian mystery film directed by Arturo Carrari. The title translates to The Crime of Cravinhos, referring to a suburb of Sâo Paolo, Brazil. It is known as "the first great box office success of São Paulo cinema," and it gathered a group of followers around the director. Some sources say Italian-born Gilberto Rossi was the director, and not just the cinematographer.

== Plot ==
The film is based on a real crime in Sǎo Paulo. Dona Sinhá Junqueira, the owner of a coffee farm in Ribeirão Preto, is said to have ordered the murder of her son-in-law.

== Cast ==
- Rodolfo Arena
- Antônio de Camilles
- Elvira de Camilles
- Carmo Nacarato
- Filippo Santoro
- Fiorini Silva
- Antônio Tagliaferro
- Nicola Tartagliore
- Humbertina Trimantini
