= Tizuka Yamasaki =

Brazilian film director (born 1949)

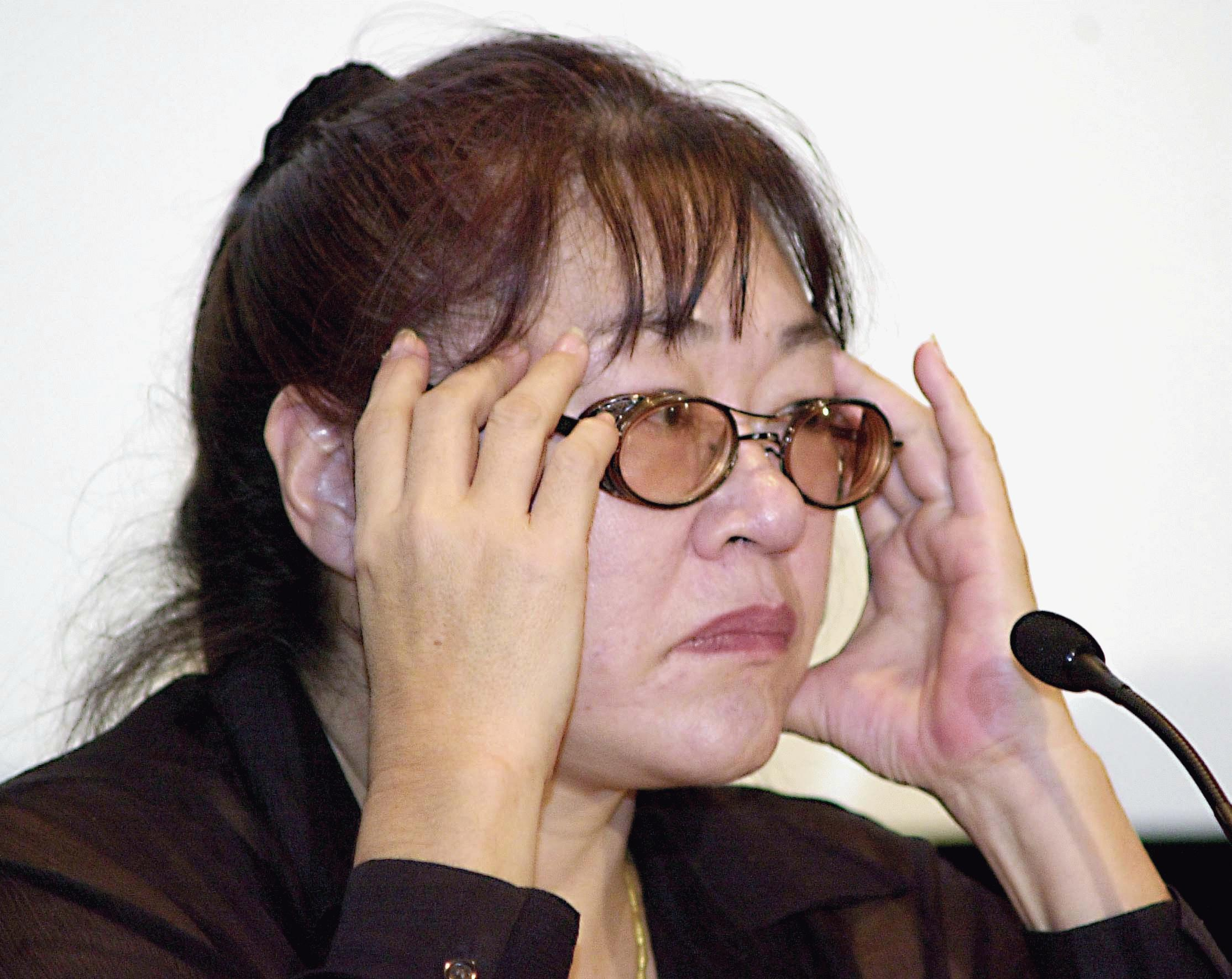
- Born: Tizuka Yamasaki; 12 May 1949 (age 77); Porto Alegre, Rio Grande do Sul, Brazil
- Occupations: Film and television director

Tizuka Yamasaki (born May 12, 1949) is a Brazilian Zu film director.

== Early life and work ==
Born in Porto Alegre, at the age of 2, Tizuka moved back with her Japanese immigrant parents to the city of Atibaia, in the state of São Paulo. In her teenage years, Yamasaki moved to São Paulo city for an undergraduate course in architecture, though she changed her mind before her admission and moved to Brasília to study cinema instead. Yamasaki finished college in Rio de Janeiro, where she started her professional career.

Yamasaki was one of the first women filmmakers in Brazil who achieved a successful and longstanding career. She and her peers learned filmmaking by working on the sets of well-established Cinema Novo directors. Yamasaki worked as director assistant with Nelson Pereira dos Santos and Glauber Rocha. Yamasaki challenged the norms of Cinema Novo by increasing both the representation of women and the awareness of issues affecting women in Brazilian society. Her film style focuses on historical subjects and she uses the genre of melodrama to reconstruct Brazilian politics, history and culture.

Yamasaki established herself as one of the most important film directors of the 1980s. Her films discussed sexuality and traditional gender roles more openly within Brazilian cultural identity. Yamasaki initiated a “cinema of emotion” to comment on Brazil's past and rework female figures’ experiences in Brazil's history.

She's also a director of telenovelas and TV series. Yamasaki began her work with auteur-style films, then transitioned to work in television. Yamaski continued to reference auteur cinema within her TV series productions. Yamasaki's work challenged glamorous Brazilian television by focusing on natural and realistic images.

During her career, especially during the final years of the dictatorship, Yamasaki has suffered censorship and funding issues with her films. In response to these challenges, Yamasaki established her own production company in 1976, Centro de Produção e Comunicação (Production and Communication Center). This enabled her to bypass government regulations and become eligible for production funding from Embrafilme.

Tizuka gained some critical acclaim with her 1980 film Gaijin, Os Caminhos da Liberdade (a.k.a. Gaijin, a Brazilian Odyssey), a story about Japanese immigration to Brazil. She has, however, been criticized for directing overly commercial movies with the children TV show hostess Xuxa. In 2003, she completed Gaijin 2 as a sequel to her debut film.

== Television productions ==
- Metamorphoses (2004) – telenovela
- A madona de cedro (1994) – miniseries
- Amazônia (1992) – telenovela
- Kananga do Japão (1989) – telenovela
- O pagador de promessas (1988) – miniseries

== Filmography as director ==
- Gaijin - Os Caminhos da Liberdade (1980)
- Parahyba, Mulher-Macho (1983)
- Patriamada (1984)
- Lua de Cristal (1990)
- Fica Comigo (1996)
- O Noviço Rebelde (1997)
- Xuxa Requebra (1999)
- Xuxa Popstar (2000)
- Gaijin - Ama-me Como Sou (2005)
- 1817: A Revolução Esquecida (2007)
- Xuxa em O Mistério de Feiurinha (2009)
- Aparecida: O Milagre (2010)
- Encantados (2017)
