= Aunt Virginia =

- Theatrical release poster
- Directed by: Fabio Meira
- Written by: Fabio Meira
- Produced by: Janaina Diniz Guerra; Fabio Meira
- Starring: Vera Holtz
- Cinematography: Leonardo Feliciano
- Edited by: Karen Akerman
- Music by: Cesar Camargo Mariano
- Production companies: Roseira Filmes; Kinossaurus
- Release date: August 13, 2023 (Gramado)
- Running time: 98 minutes
- Country: Brazil
- Language: Portuguese

Aunt Virginia (Portuguese: Tia Virgínia) is a 2023 Brazilian comedy-drama film written, directed and co-produced by Fabio Meira. Starring Vera Holtz. It had its world premiere at the 51st Gramado Film Festival on August 13, 2023, where it competed for the Golden Kikito and was honored with the Kikito Critics Prize for Best Film, Best Actress for Vera Holtz, Best Screenplay, Best Art Direction, Best Sound Design, and an Honorable Mention for Vera Valdez.

== Synopsis ==
Virgínia never married and didn't even have children, her sisters convinced her to leave the life she had to take care of her parents. The film takes place in a single day: the day that Virginia prepares to receive the sisters Vanda and Valquíria, who are traveling to celebrate Christmas.

== Cast ==
The actors participating in this film are:

- Vera Holtz as Aunt Virginia
- Arlete Salles as Vanda
- Louise Cardoso as Valquíria
- Vera Valdez
- Daniela Fontan
- Iuri Saraiva
- Antônio Pitanga
- Amanda Lyra

== Production ==
Principal photography finished in late February 2020 in Nova Friburgo, Brazil.

== Release ==
Aunt Virginia had its world premiere on August 13, 2023, at the 51st Gramado Film Festival.

== Accolades ==
Year	Award / Festival	Category	Recipient	Result	Ref.
2023	Gramado Film Festival	Golden Kikito	Aunt Virginia	Nominated	
2023	Gramado Film Festival	Kikito Critics Prize - Best Film	Aunt Virginia	Won	
2023	Gramado Film Festival	Best Actress	Vera Holtz	Won	
2023	Gramado Film Festival	Best Screenplay	Fabio Meira	Won	
2023	Gramado Film Festival	Best Art Direction	Ana Mara Abreu	Won	
2023	Gramado Film Festival	Best Sound Design	Rubem Valdés	Won	
2023	Gramado Film Festival	Honorable Mention	Vera Valdez	Won	
