= Roberto Mauro =

Brazilian footballer (born 1941)

Personal information
- Full name: Roberto Mauro de Oliveira
- Date of birth: April 12, 1941 (age 85)
- Place of birth: Belo Horizonte, Brazil
- Height: 5 ft 9 in (1.75 m)
- Position: Forward

Youth career
- Barreiro-MG
- América-MG

Senior career*
Years	Team	Apps	(Gls)
- América-MG
- Bangu
- América-RJ
1964–1967	Atlético Mineiro		
1968	Washington Whips	10	(4)
1968–1969	Atlético Mineiro		
- Villa Nova
Total		10	(4)
- * Club domestic league appearances and goals

Roberto Mauro de Oliveira (born April 12, 1941) is a former Brazilian soccer player who played in the NASL.

== Career statistics ==
=== Club ===
Club	Season	League			Cup		Other		Total	
Club	Season	Division	Apps	Goals	Apps	Goals	Apps	Goals	Apps	Goals
Washington Whips	1968	NASL	10	4	0	0	0	0	10	4
Career total			10	4	0	0	0	0	10	4
