= Cinema of Brazil =

- Gramado Film Festival
- No. of screens: 3,530 (2024)
  - Per capita: 1.6 per 100,000 (2015)
- Main distributors: Universal (20.8%); Disney (17.3%)

Produced feature films (2015)
- Total: 129
- Fictional: 79 (61.2%)
- Animated: 26 (10.0%)
- Documentary: 50 (38.8%)

Number of admissions (2015)
- Total: 172,943,242
- National films: 22,485,736 (13%)

Gross box office (2015)
- Total: R$2.35 billion
- National films: R$278 million (11.8%)

Cinema of Brazil refers to the film industry based in Brazil. The Brazilian cinema was introduced early in the 20th century but took some time to consolidate itself as a popular form of entertainment. Its film industry has gone through periods of ups and downs, a reflection of its dependency on state funding and incentives.

== History ==
=== Early days ===
A couple of months after the Lumière brothers' invention, a film exhibition was held in Rio de Janeiro. As early as 1898, Affonso Segreto supposedly filmed the Guanabara Bay from the ship Brésil on a return journey from Europe, though some researchers question the veracity of this event as no copy of the film remains. He would go on to make documentaries with his brother Paschoal Segreto.

From the early beginning of the 20th century, as early as 1900 to the year of 1912, Brazilian films had made a major impact on the internal market, which saw an annual production of over one-hundred films. In 1908, during a period coined Brazil's "golden age" of Cinema, the country saw its first widely popular film, titled Os Estranguladores, by Antonio Leal.

An ad of a May 1987 issue of Gazeta de Petrópolis, as shown in 1995 by Jorge Vittorio Capellaro and Paulo Roberto Ferreira, was introduced as the new "birth certificate" of Brazilian cinema, as three short films were advertised: Chegada do Trem em Petrópolis, Bailado de Crenças no Colégio de Andarahy and Ponto Terminal da Linha dos Bondes de Botafogo, Vendo-se os Passageiros Subir e Descer.

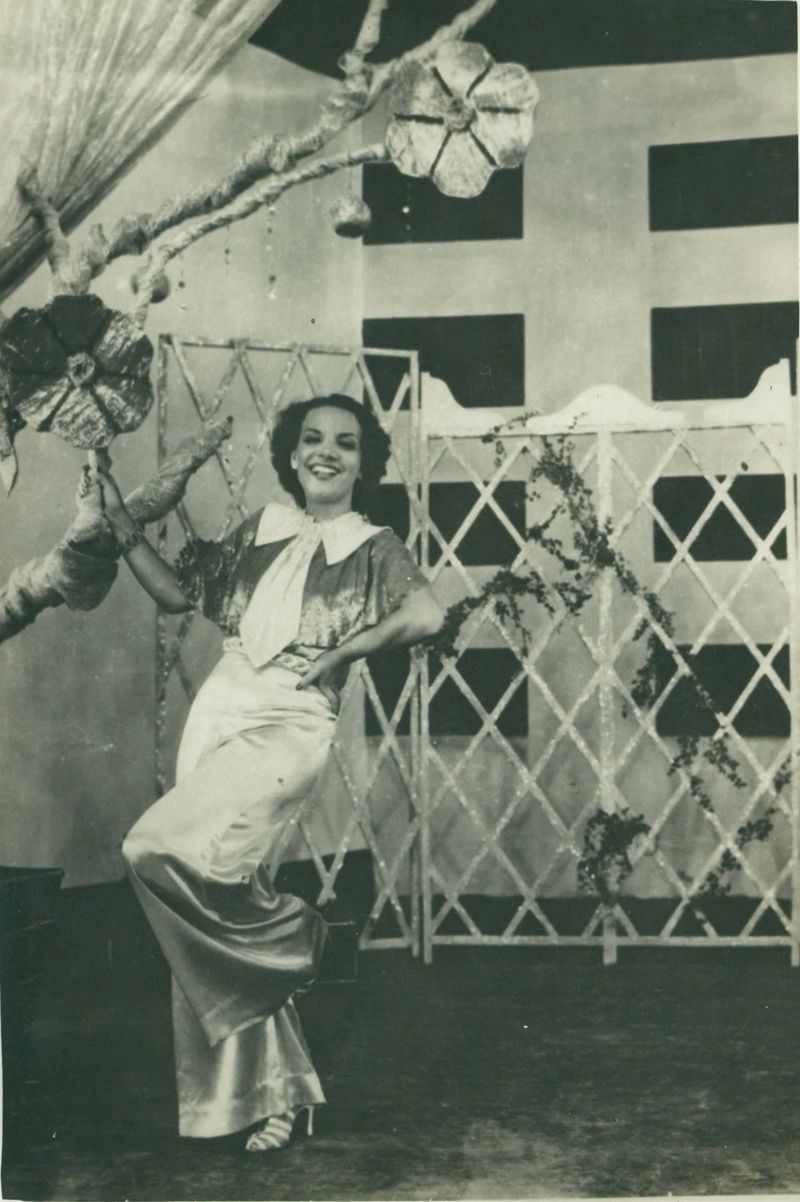
Carmen Miranda in Alô, Alô Carnaval (1936). The Brazilian actress gained visibility overseas.

During this belle époque of Brazilian cinema, when black and white silent films were less costly to produce, most work resulted from the effort of passionate individuals willing to take on the task themselves rather than commercial enterprises. Neither is given much attention by the state, with legislation for the sector being practically non-existent. Film theaters only become larger in number in Rio and São Paulo late in the following decade, as power supply becomes more reliable.

Foreign films as well as short films documenting local events were most common. Some of the first fictional work filmed in the country were the so-called "posed" films, reconstructions of crimes that had recently made the press headlines. The first success of this genre is António Leal and Francisco Marzullo's Os Estranguladores (1908). "Sung" films were also popular. The actors would hide behind the screen and dub themselves singing during projection. During the 1920s film production flourished throughout several regions of the country: Recife, Campinas, Cataguases, Juiz de Fora and Guaranésia.

Also in the early 20th century of Brazilian cinema, there was a major lack of Black presence in films that were being made. Brazilian and American films are common in this aspect, as both countries had endured similar types of European colonization, and how the colored were not given any time or recognition on film. Many of the early films being produced in Brazil were also made by Italian Brazilians, with respect to the likes of Affonso Segreto. Another way Brazil and America had similar aspects in their films is the idea of "blackface" in America, and the "redface" in Brazil.

At the end of World War One, silent Brazilian cinema moved to the growing expansion of women and their social class, mainly the middle, and shows their modernization and diversification. Hollywood influenced the idea of women becoming more seductive in Brazilian cinema as well with new types of hairstyles, smoking cigarettes, and looking "exotic", in terms of appearance.

Hollywood films were also extremely popular during this time, accounting for as much as 85 percent of film material being exhibited on Brazilian screens in 1928. That year, an estimated 16,464,000 linear feet of film was exported to Brazil, making it Hollywood's third largest foreign market. European films, mostly from Germany and France, were also exhibited with relative frequency. Fan magazines like Cinearte and A Scena Muda were published during this time, featuring both domestic and Hollywood films and stars.

=== 1930s and 1940s ===
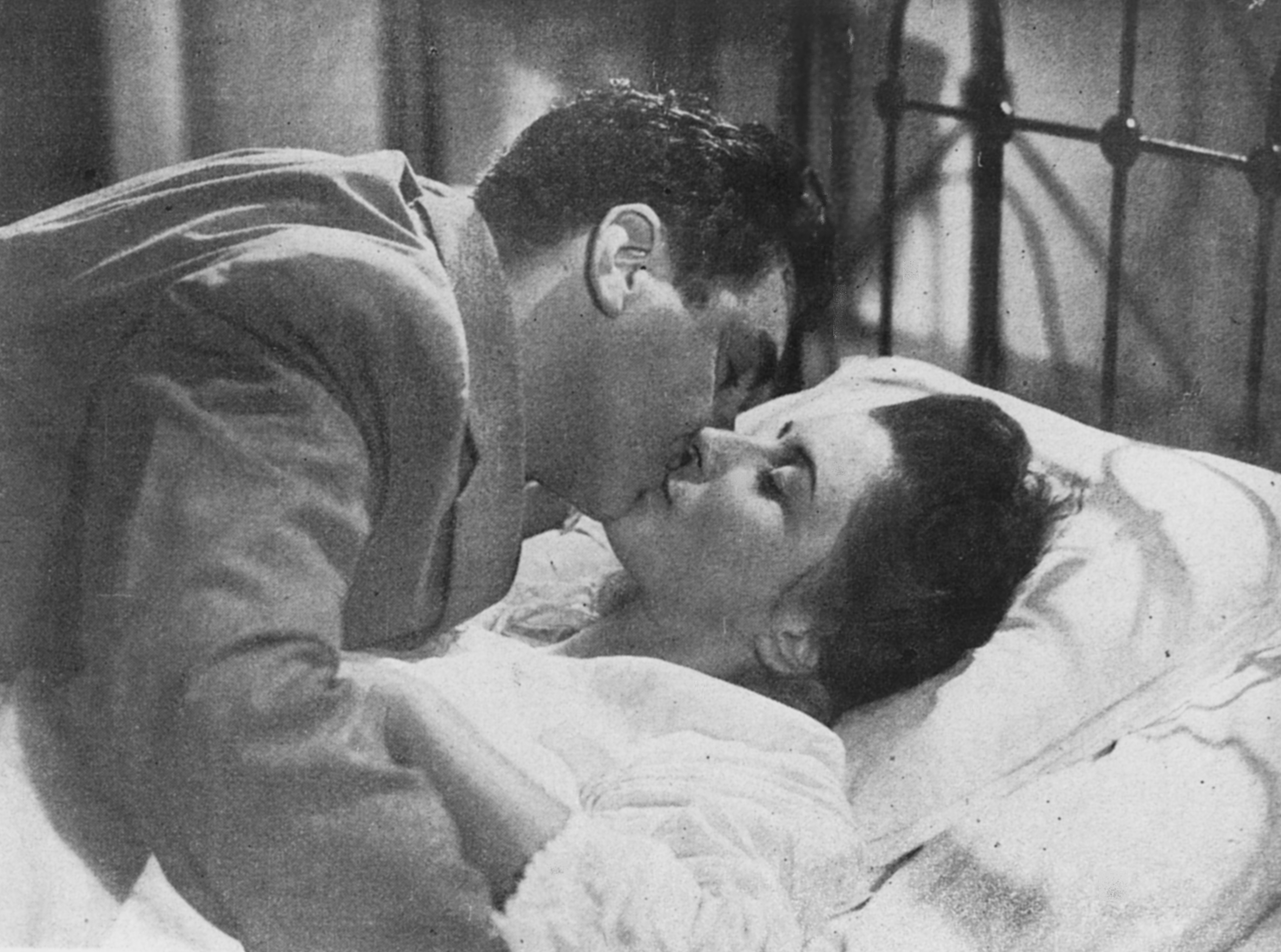
Scene from the 1943 Brazilian film Way to Heaven, Caminho do Céu. A kiss between Celso Guimarães and Rosina Pagã, protagonists.

=== Atlântida ===
During the 1940s and 1950s, films produced by the Atlântida Cinematográfica peaked and attracted large audiences by continuing with chanchadas. Among the actors that became strongly associated with Atlântida who had previously worked in Cinédia films are Oscarito, a comedian somewhat reminiscent of a Harpo Marx and commonly cast as lead, and Grande Otelo, who usually had a smaller supporting role and is often Oscarito's sidekick.

The two actors became widely popular throughout Brazil as an amazing comical duo. Otelo, would see much of the humor falling on him at the time due to his Afro-Brazilian characteristics, while Oscarito became the comical foil in the film, a more pale-toned man with like characteristics.

The two helped to display the diversity in Brazilian cinema to reflect on the diversity of Brazil itself. José Lewgoy was commonly cast as a villain while Zézé Macedo often took on the role of the undesired, nagging wife.

The films of this period have often been brushed aside as being overly commercial and americanized, though by the seventies a certain amount of revisionism sought to restore its legitimacy. Despite being overlooked by intellectual elites, these films attracted large audiences as none of the Cinema Novo films would achieve.

Today, the telenovela, especially the "novela das sete" (a nickname given to soap operas produced by the Rede Globo channel aired around seven p.m. Mondays through Saturdays) is sometimes identified as carrying on the spirit of the chanchada. Many of the films produced by the company have been lost throughout the years due to fire and flooding of its storage facilities.

=== Vera Cruz ===
The Companhia Cinematográfica Vera Cruz was a production company founded in the state of São Paulo during the forties and most notable for its output during the following decade. It is in this period that Lima Barreto's classic O Cangaceiro was produced. The movement was named after the large production studio, inspired by Hollywood scale.

However, despite O Cangaceiro, which was clearly inspired by western genre, the essence of these films followed the Italian cinema's style, popular between São Paulo's cultural elite in that time. Vera Cruz films were highly commercialized, which led some directors to begin experimenting with independent cinema. This movement away from commercialized Vera Cruz style films came to be called Cinema Novo, or New Cinema. Vera Cruz eventually bankrupted and closed.

=== Cinema Novo ===
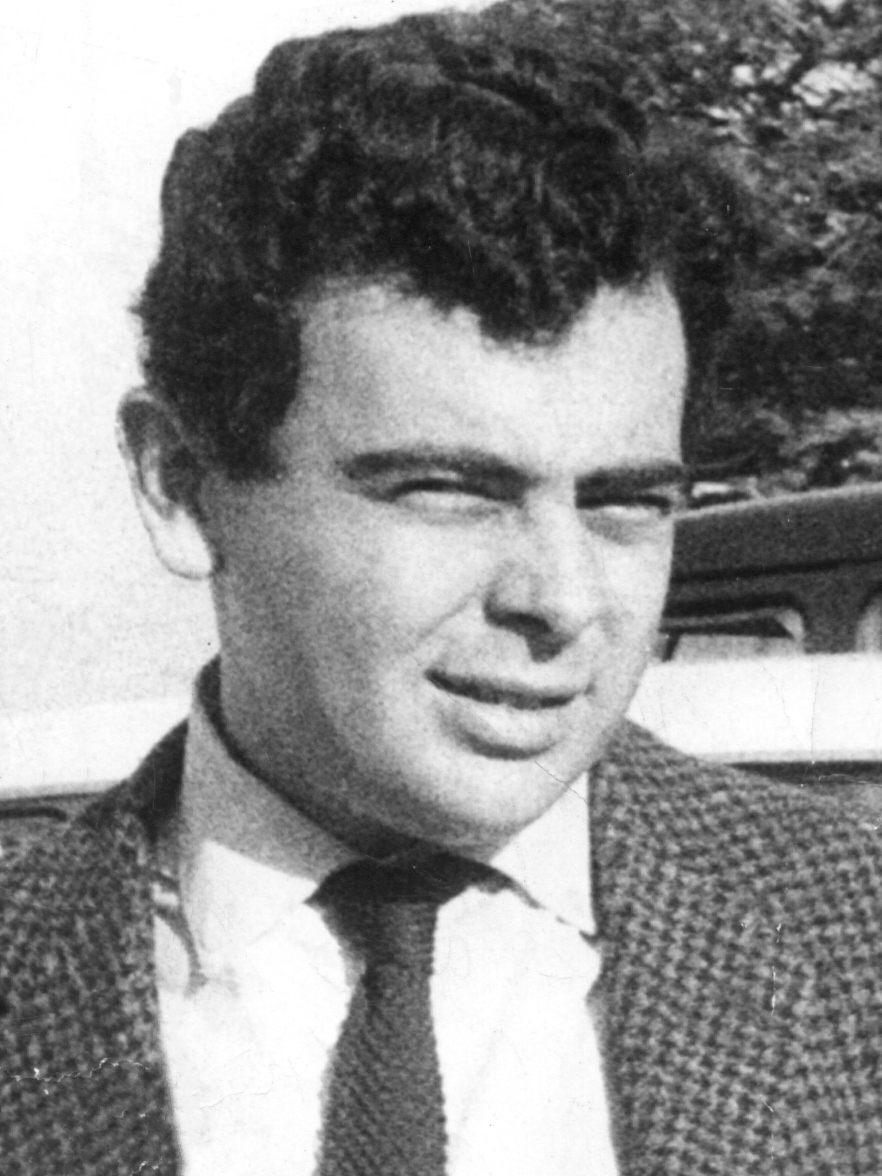
Director Glauber Rocha, a central figure of the Cinema Novo movement

Rocha often spoke of his films as being a departure from what he considered to be the colonizer's view, to whom poverty was an exotic and distant reality, as well as the colonized who regarded their third world status as shameful. He sought to portray misery, hunger and the violence they generate and thus suggest the need for a revolution. Deus e o Diabo na Terra do Sol and Terra em Transe are some of his most famous works.

Other key directors of the movement include Nelson Pereira dos Santos, Ruy Guerra, Leon Hirszman, and Carlos Diegues. Freedom to express political views becomes scarce as the 1964 Brazilian military regime takes place and repression increases over the following years, forcing many of these artists with a Marxist or communist bent into exile. In 1985, with the end of the military regime, these artists and singers returned to Brazil.

=== B Films ===
A "marginal cinema" emerges associated with the Boca de Lixo area in São Paulo. In 1968, Rogério Sganzerla releases O Bandido da Luz Vermelha, a story based on an infamous criminal of the period. The following year Júlio Bressane's Killed the Family and Went to the Movies (Matou a família e foi ao cinema) came out, a story in which the protagonist does exactly what is described by the title. Marginal cinema of this period is sometimes also referred to as "udigrudi", a mocking of the English word underground. Also popular was Zé do Caixão, the screen alter ego of actor and horror film director José Mojica Marins.

Associated with the genre is also the pornochanchada, a popular genre in the 1970s. As the name suggests, these were sex comedies, though they did not depict sex explicitly. One key factor as to why these marginal films thrived was that film theaters were obliged to obey quotas for national films. Many owners of such establishments would finance low-budget films, including those of pornographic content. Though the country was under military regime, censorship tended to be more political than cultural. That these films thrived could be perceived by many as a cause of embarrassment, yet they managed to draw in enough audiences so as to stay on the market consistently throughout those years.

=== 1970s and 1980s ===
Films in this period benefited from state-run agencies, most notably Embrafilme. Its role was perceived as somewhat ambiguous. It was criticized for its dubious selection criteria, bureaucracy and favouritism, and was seen as a form of government control over artistic production. On the other hand, much of the work of this period was produced mainly because of its existence.

A varied and memorable filmography was produced, including Arnaldo Jabor's adaptation of Nelson Rodrigues' All Nudity Shall Be Punished (1973), Carlos Diegues' Bye Bye Brazil (1979), Hector Babenco's Pixote (1981) and Nelson Pereira do Santos' Memoirs of Prison (1984). One of the most successful films in Brazilian film history is an adaptation of Jorge Amado's Dona Flor and Her Two Husbands (1976) by Bruno Barreto.

In 1972, Hanni Rocha hired a cinema in Rio de Janeiro (renamed Cinema I) to show Akira Kurosawa's Dodes'ka-den, starting art film distribution in Rio. He went on to form Grupo Nacional de Diversões, which became the biggest art film circuit in Brazil.

Brazilian cinemas had to show Brazilian films for a certain number of days per year. Originally this was 56 days and increased to 84 days and during the 1970s, this quota was increased further to 112 days of the year, but any film older than five years did not count towards the quota. To meet the quota, there was an increase in the production and distribution of pornochanchada films.

=== Retomada and contemporary cinema ===
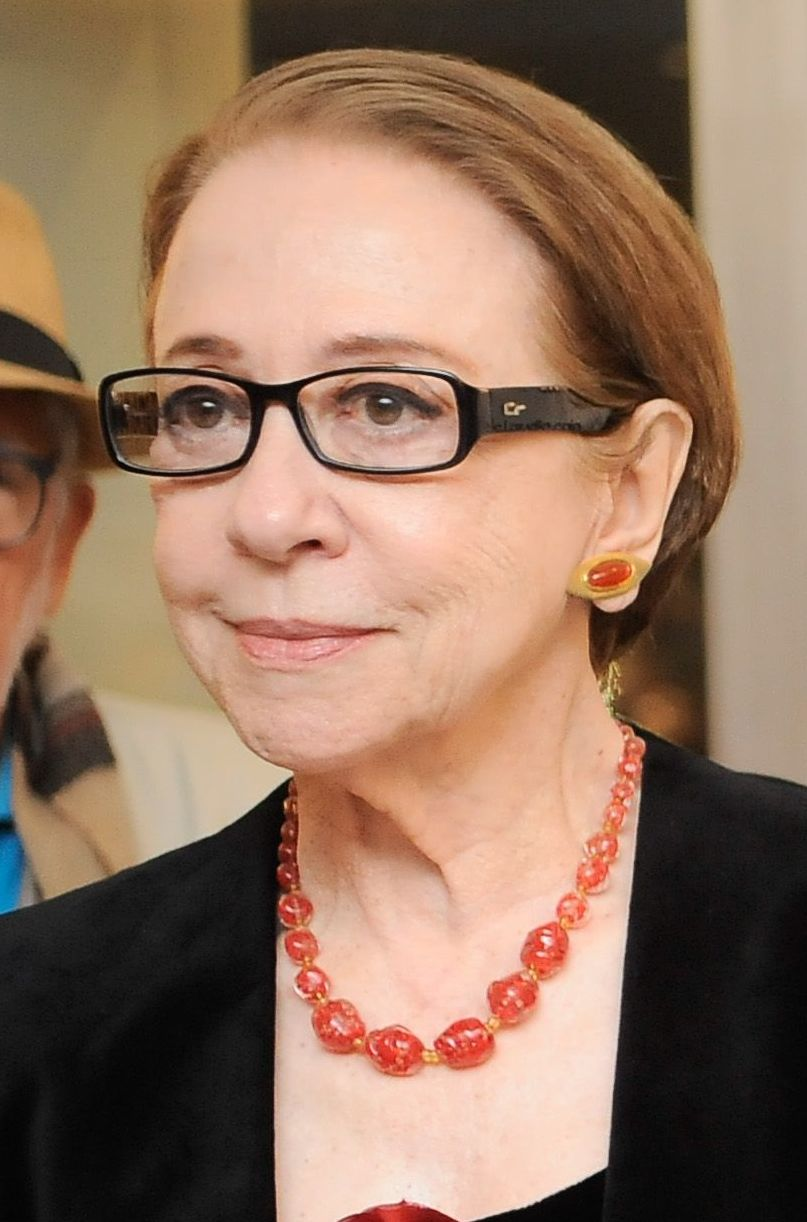
Fernanda Montenegro, mostly recognized for her leading role in Central Station, for which she was nominated for the Academy Award for Best Actress, becoming the first Brazilian actress to ever be nominated in the category. Also for this work, she was nominated for the Golden Globe Award for Best Actress – Motion Picture Drama and won the Silver Bear at the Berlin International Film Festival.

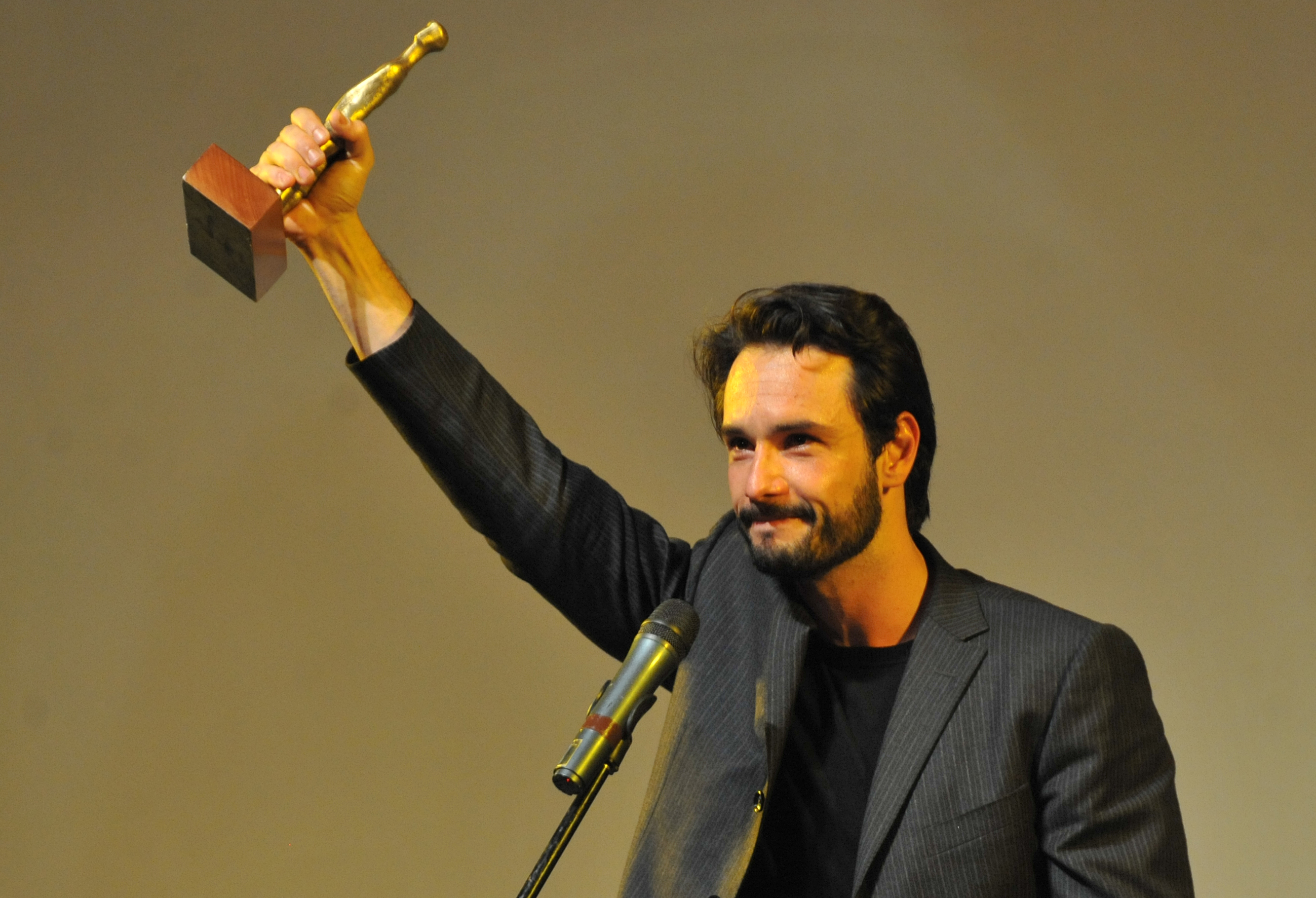
Brazilian actor Rodrigo Santoro lifts a statue he received for the best actor award at the 44th Festival of Brasília for the film My Country, Meu País, by André Ristum.

The early nineties, under the Fernando Collor government, saw a significant decrease in State funding that lead to a practical halt in film production and the closing of Embrafilme in 1989. However, in the mid nineties the country witnessed a new burst in cinematic production, mainly thanks to the introduction of incentive laws under the new FHC government.

The comedy Carlota Joaquina - Princess of Brazil came out in 1995 and is held by many as the first film of the retomada, or the return of national film production. Since then there have been films with Academy Award nominations such as O Quatrilho, Four Days in September, Central Station and City of God.

The dark urban film The Trespasser was chosen as the best film of the period by magazine Revista de Cinema. Some other films that have attracted attention are Carandiru, The Man Who Copied, Madame Satã, Behind the Sun, Olga and Two Sons of Francisco, though perhaps some of these would no longer qualify as films of the retomada, since the term is only adequate to describe the initial boost that occurred in the nineties.

Still common in Brazilian cinema is a taste for social and political criticism, a trait that reflects its strong Cinema Novo influences. For the common movie goer, there has been a shift in perception towards Brazilian cinema as becoming more audience friendly.

Television shows of the Rede Globo network such as Casseta & Planeta and Os Normais have also received film versions and Globo Filmes, Globo's film production branch, has been behind many of the films that have come out over the years, often as a co-producer. Globo's presence is seen by some critics as being overly commercial, thus compelling certain filmmakers to work outside its system to create independent work. Documentaries have also had a strong place in Brazilian cinema thanks to the work of renowned directors such as Eduardo Coutinho and João Moreira Salles.

In 2007, the film Elite Squad gained headlines due to how quickly leaked DVD copies spread among viewers before its release on theaters, but also due to the large number of audience members who cheered police brutality scenes.

in 2025, I'm Still Here won an Academy Award for Best International Feature Film.

As of 2025, Brazil has three Film Cities by UNESCO making it the only country to have it. Santos became the first Brazilian film city in 2015, is known for its port and many production companies. Penedo became the second Brazilian film city in 2023, where the old town is often used as locations and holds an annual film festivals. São Paulo became the third and newest Brazilian city in 2025, is often called as Brazilian film center and hosts annual São Paulo Film Festival.

== Domestic market ==
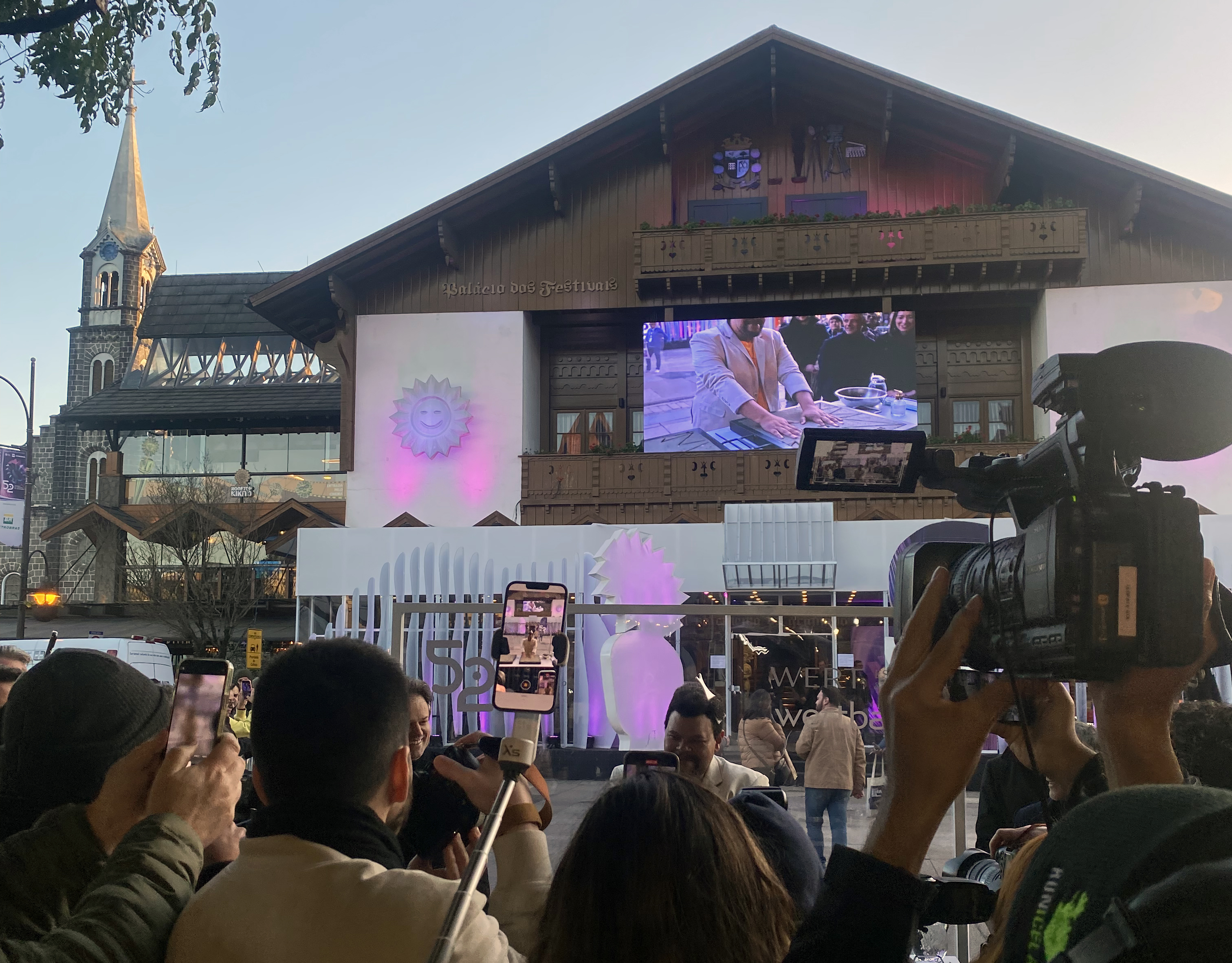
Gramado Film Festival in the Brazilian city of Gramado

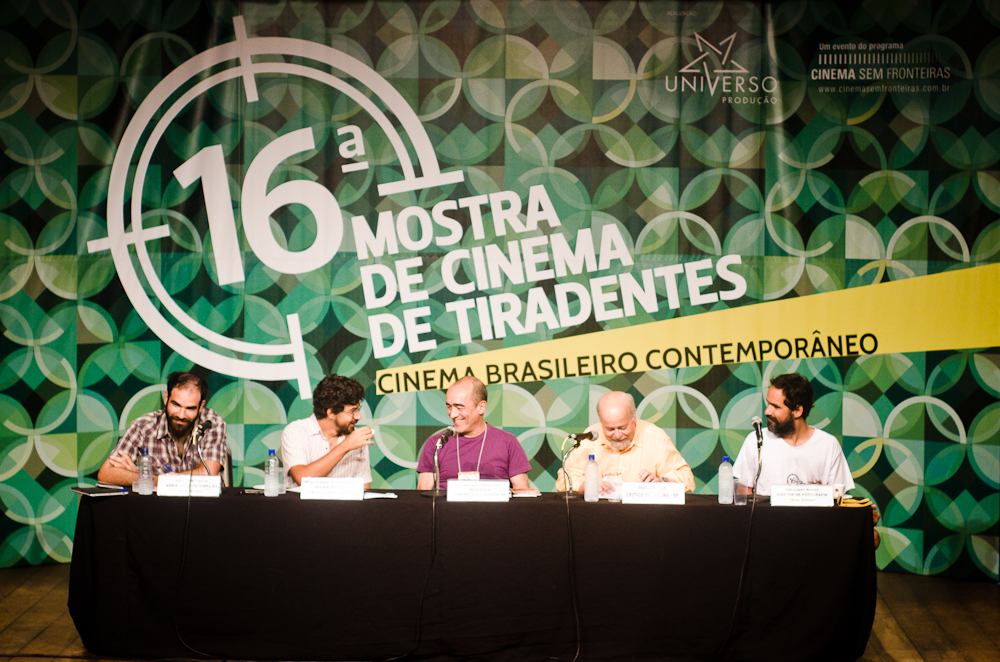
16th Tiradentes Film Festival brings together audiences, directors, producers and those interested in cinema in general for 10 days of activities related to the production, dissemination and circulation of Contemporary Brazilian cinema.

Since the 1970s, the quantity of movie theaters has declined heavily. During the 1990s, it became common for small theaters to close while multiplex theaters, which are usually found in shopping centers, gained market share. By December 1999, Cinemark Theatres was the largest theater chain with 180 screens followed by local exhibitor, Grupo Seveirano Ribeiro, with 170 and UCI Cinemas with 80 screens. In the last decades, the accessibility of televisions and computers sold at lower prices combined with success in making telenovelas of high production quality made cinema less attractive to lower income audiences. In addition, ticket prices increased more than tenfold in a span of twenty years.

In the early 1990s Brazilian film production suffered as a result of the president Fernando Collor's laissez-faire policy; the sector had depended on state sponsorship and protection. However, with the retomada Brazilian film regained speed, though not to the same extent it had seen before. A significant increase in audience was recorded, however, from 2000 to 2002, with 7 million viewers, to 2003, when 22 million viewers came to theaters to watch national films.

Because these films were made possible thanks to incentive laws introduced in the 1990s and that the number of viewers drawn in from year to year can fluctuate significantly, it is often questioned whether film production has in fact reached a certain amount of stability and whether or not it could in the future succumb to any governmental whims.

Incentive laws allow Brazilian films to receive funding from companies that, by acting as sponsors, are allowed tax deductions. A common criticism is that, through this system, though films are no longer directly controlled by state, they are, nevertheless, subject to the approval of entrepreneurs who are logically cautious as to which content they wish to associate their brands. Even with funding, there are still areas that require some struggle from filmmakers, such as distribution, television participation and DVD release.

== See also ==
- Ancine (National Film Agency)
- Dublavídeo (Dubbing studio in São Paulo)
- List of Brazilian films
- List of Brazilian film directors
- List of Academy Awards nominations for Brazilian films
- Abraccine Top 100 Brazilian films
- Mouth of Garbage Cinema
- Grande Prêmio do Cinema Brasileiro
- Cinemateca do Museu de Arte Moderna

== Sources ==
- Pinazza, Natália and Bayman, Louis (eds) (2013). 'Directory of World Cinema: Brazil. Bristol: Intellect.
- Augusto, Sérgio. Esse mundo é um pandeiro: chanchada de Getúlio a JK. Companhia das Letras.
- Benamou, Catherine, and Marsh, Leslie Louise. "Women Filmmakers and Citizenship in Brazil: From Bossa Nova to the Retomada." In Hispanic and Lusophone Women Filmmakers: Theory, Practice and Differences ed. Parvati Nari and Julián Daniel Gutierrez-Albilla, 54–71. Manchester, England: University of Manchester Press, 2013.
- Burton, Julianne. Cinema and Social Change in Latin America: Conversations with Filmmakers. Austin, TX: University of Texas Press, 1986.
- Dennison, Stephanie and SHAW, Lisa. Popular Cinema in Brazil. Manchester, England: University Manchester Press, 2004.
- Gomes, Paulo Emilo Sales. Cinema: trajetória no subdesenvolvimento. Paz e Terra. * 30 Anos de Cinema e Festival: a história do Festival de Brasília do Cinema Brasileiro / coordinated by Berê Bahia. Brasília, Fundação Cultural do Distrito Federal, 1998.
- Caldas, Ricardo Wahrendorff & Montoro, Tânia. A Evolução do Cinema no Século XX. Casa das Musas, Brasília, 2006.
- Brazilian Cinema. Ministry of Culture, Brasília 1999 (catalog).
- Glauber Rocha: del hambre al sueño. Obra, política y pensamiento. Malba - Colección Constantini, Artes Gráficas Ronor S.A., April 2004.
- Nagib, Lúcia. Brazil on Screen: Cinema Nôvo, New Cinema, Utopia. London: IB Tauris, 2007.
- Nagib, Lúcia, ed. The New Brazilian Cinema. London: I.B. Tauris & Co, 2006.
- Navitski, Rielle Brazilian Cinema and Moviegoing Oxford University Press, 2020.
- Pick, Suzana M. The New Latin American Cinema: A Continental Project. Austin, TX: University of Texas Press, 1993.
- Torres San Martín, Patricia. "Lost and Invisible: A History of Latin American Women Filmmakers." In Hispanic and Lusophone Women Filmmakers: Theory, Practice and Differences ed. Parvati Nari and Julián Daniel Gutierrez-Albilla, 29–41. Manchester, England: University of Manchester Press, 2013.
- Wilson, Pamela, and Stewart, Michelle. Global Indigenous Media: Cultures, Poetics, and Politics. Durham, NC: Duke University Press, 2008.
