= Lady on the Bus =

1978 film by Neville d'Almeida

- Theatrical release poster
- Portuguese: A Dama do Lotação
- Directed by: Neville de Almeida
- Screenplay by: Neville de Almeida
- Based on: "A Dama do Lotação" by Nelson Rodrigues
- Produced by: Albertino Fonseca; Walter Schilke; Flávio Leandro
- Starring: Sônia Braga; Nuno Leal Maia
- Cinematography: Edson Santos
- Edited by: Raimundo Higino
- Music by: Caetano Veloso
- Production company: Regina Filmes
- Distributed by: Embrafilme
- Release date: 17 April 1978 (Brazil)
- Running time: 90 minutes
- Country: Brazil
- Language: Portuguese

Lady on the Bus (Portuguese: A Dama do Lotação) is a 1978 Brazilian erotic drama film written and directed by Neville de Almeida, based on the short story of the same name by Nelson Rodrigues.

== Plot ==
Solange and Carlos have known each other since childhood and their marriage is arranged. On their wedding night, the inexperienced Solange resists her husband, who grows frustrated and impatient. Carlos ultimately forces himself on her and commits rape. Solange is traumatized and despite loving Carlos, wants nothing to do with him anymore. Solange tries to overcome her sexual dysfunction by having sex with strangers she picks up on buses.

== Cast ==
- Sônia Braga as Solange
- Nuno Leal Maia as Carlos
- Jorge Dória as Alexandre
- Paulo César Pereio as Assunção
- Cláudio Marzo as psychoanalyst
- Márcia Rodrigues as Dolores
- Paulo Villaça as Loafer
- Roberto Bonfim as Bacalhau
- Rodolfo Arena
- Ney Santanna as Contínuo
- Ivan Setta as Mosquito
- Washington Fernandes as Passenger
- Yara Amaral as Dona Matilde
- Adele Fátima as Samba dancer
- Cissa Guimarães as Wedding guest
