= Neville d'Almeida =

Brazilian filmmaker and screenwriter

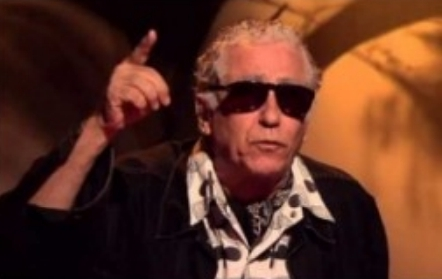
- d'Almeida in 2014
- Born: Neville Duarte de Almeida; 1941 (age 84–85); Belo Horizonte, Minas Gerais, Brazil
- Occupations: Filmmaker, actor, artist, photographer
- Years active: 1968–present
- Notable work: Lady on the Bus; Killed the Family and Went to the Movies

Neville Duarte de Almeida (born 1941), known as Neville d'Almeida, is a Brazilian filmmaker, screenwriter, actor, photographer and multimedia artist, involved with contemporary art, installations, objects of art and performance.

== Life and career ==
D'Almeida was born in Belo Horizonte into a Methodist family. He studied theater at the TU (Teatro Universitário de Minas Gerais), participated in the Centro de Estudos Cinematográficos (Center of Film Studies), and the Centro Mineiro Experimental when he started to work as an filmmaker. Some of its transgressive, avant-garde films were censored or banned by the Brazilian military dictatorship. His 1978 film Lady on the Bus, starring Sônia Braga, is the third highest-grossing Brazilian film of all time

In 1970 he went to New York, where he collaborated with Hélio Oiticica in the art installation Cosmococas.

== Filmography ==
=== Director ===
- 1968: Jardim de Guerra
- 1971: Piranhas do Asfalto
- 1971: Mangue Bangue
- 1972: Gatos da Noite
- 1973: Surucucu Catiripapo
- 1978: Lady on the Bus
- 1980: Os Sete Gatinhos
- 1980: Música para Sempre
- 1982: Rio Babilônia
- 1991: Killed the Family and Went to the Movies
- 1997: Navalha na Carne
- 1999: Hoje é Dia de Rock
- 2005: Maksuara — Crepúsculo dos deuses
- 2015: A Frente Fria que a Chuva Traz

=== Actor ===
- 1968: Hunger for Love - Felipe's Roommate in New York
- 1968: The Red Light Bandit
- 1969: O Anjo Nasceu
- 1970: Sem Essa, Aranha
- 1971: Mangue Bangue
- 1985: Noite
- 1985: Areias Escaldantes - Espião
- 1988: Moon over Parador - Family Member
- 1989: Sermões, a História de Antônio Vieira - (final film role)
