= Dublavídeo =

Brazilian dubbing studio

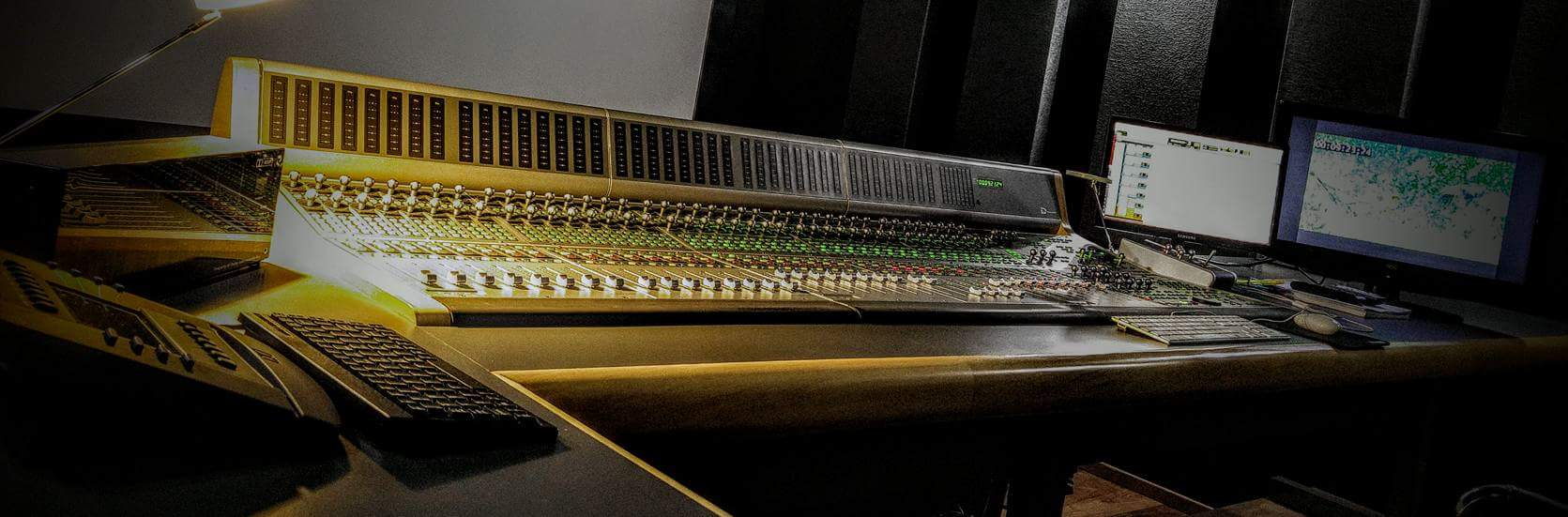
- Company type: Dubbing studio
- Founded: 1997
- Headquarters: São Paulo, Brazil
- Services: Dubbing
- Website: www.instagram.com/dublavideo

Dublavídeo is a dubbing studio located in the city of São Paulo. It is currently responsible for dubbing most Sony Pictures titles in Brazil, including film and television. Also receives several works of 20th Century Fox.

== Animation ==
- 9 (2nd dub)
- The Adventures of the Little Prince (shown in SBT)
- All Dogs Go to Heaven (2nd dub)
- ALVINNN! and the Chipmunks
- American Dad! (Seasons 1–5)
- Appleseed Alpha
- As Told by Ginger
- Breadwinners
- Bunsen Is a Beast
- The Cleveland Show (Season 1)
- The Day My Butt Went Psycho!
- The Dolphin: Story of a Dreamer
- El-Hazard (shown in Rede Bandeirantes)
- Family Guy (Seasons 6–8)
- Fatal Fury: Legend of the Hungry Wolf
- Fatal Fury 2: The New Battle
- Fatal Fury 3: Road to the Final Victory
- The Fearless Four
- Futurama (1999–2003)
- Ghost in the Shell
- Iron Man: Rise of Technovore
- Jackie Chan Adventures (Seasons 2–5)
- Jibaku-kun (shown in Rede Bandeirantes)
- Justin and the Knights of Valour
- The Nut Job
- Open Season 3
- Open Season: Scared Silly
- The Outback
- Ozzy (2nd dub)
- Paprika
- Pinky Malinky
- Resident Evil: Damnation
- Resident Evil: Degeneration
- Resident Evil: Vendetta
- Rise of the Teenage Mutant Ninja Turtles
- The Snow Queen
- Teenage Mutant Ninja Turtles (2012)
- Tokyo Godfathers
- Trust Me, I'm a Genie
- The Twisted Tales of Felix the Cat (shown in Rede Record)

== Live action shows ==
- Band of Brothers (Shown by Rede Bandeirantes)
- Big Time Rush
- Damages
- Dr. Hollywood
- Glee (Shown by in FOX and Rede Bandeirantes, 2016–Brazil)
- Hannibal
- How to Get Away with Murder
- Living with Fran
- Once Upon a Time
- Prison Break (Shown by Rede Globo and Rede Bandeirantes)
- That '70s Show
- True Jackson
