= Alfonso Segreto =

Brazilian filmmaker

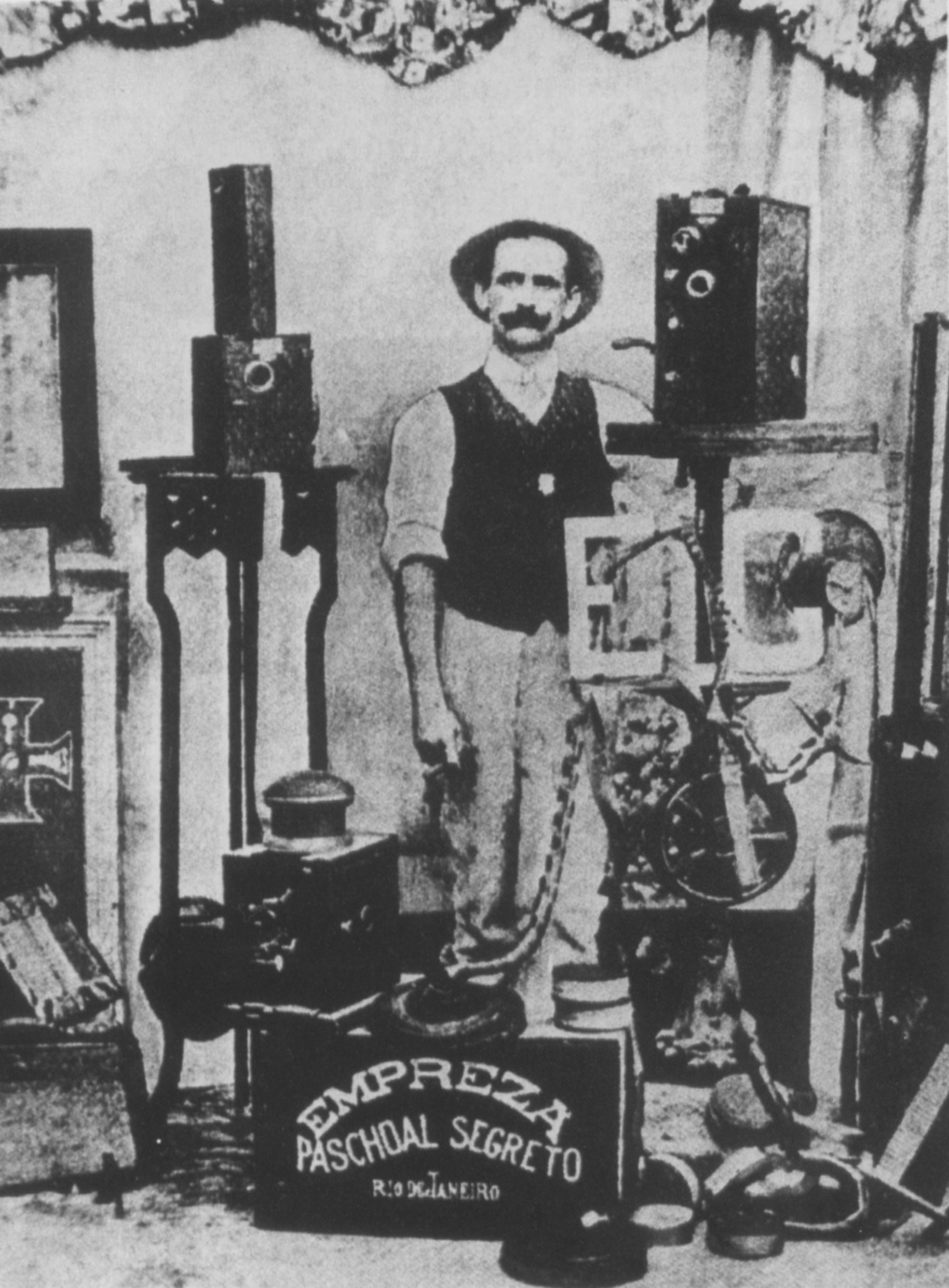

Affonso Segreto (born 27 December 1876) was an Italian-born Brazilian filmmaker.

Alfonso Segreto was born in Laureana Cilento, province of Salerno. Two of his brothers, Gaetano and Pasquale Segreto were also involved in the film industry. The opened Brazil's first cinema in Rio de Janeiro on 31 July 1897.

The Cinématographe, a film camera and projector invented by the Lumière brothers, was first exhibited in Brazil in Rio de Janeiro on 8 July 1896, under the name "Omnigrapho". In 1898, Segreto travelled to Europe and purchased a Cinématographe, which he brought back to Brazil, where he began producing his first films. This included potentially the earliest cinematic depiction of Brazil, filmed from the ship at the end of his return voyage in June 1898 as it approached Guanabara Bay.

Segreto began by shooting actuality films. He later became known for filming reconstructions of local crimes.

== Legacy ==
According to Luke McKernan, Affonso Segreto was an important figure "in the Brazilian film industry in the first decade of the century, when native production dominated the market". Brazilian cinema developed more slowly than in other countries, due to the poor electricity infrastructure.
