= Júlio Bressane =

Brazilian filmmaker and writer

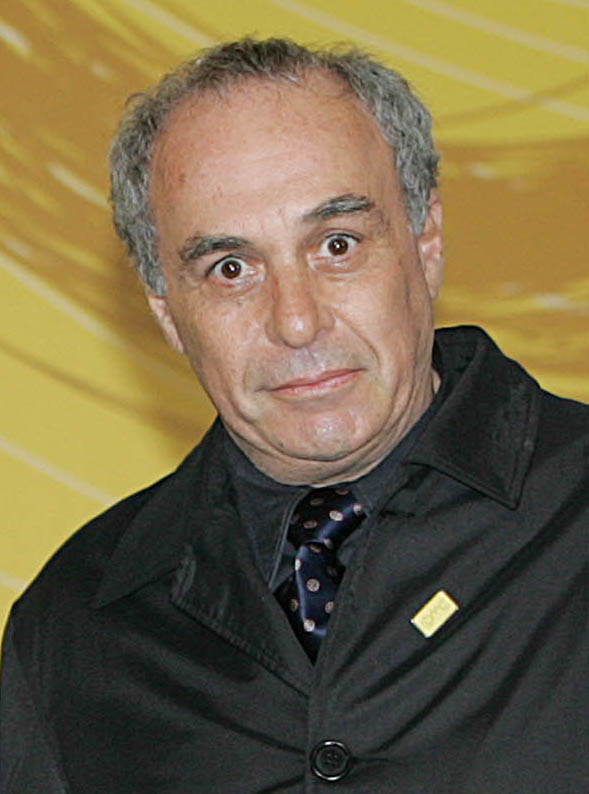
- Bressane in 2006
- Born: February 13, 1946 (age 80); Rio de Janeiro, Brazil
- Occupations: Film director, writer
- Years active: 1965–present

Júlio Eduardo Bressane de Azevedo (born February 13, 1946) is a Brazilian filmmaker and writer.

== Biography ==
A representative of the Brazilian cinema marginal, Julio Bressane began making films as an assistant director of Walter Lima Jr., in 1965.

In 1967 Bressane debuted as director with Face to Face, being selected for the Festival de Brasília. In 1970 he founded Belair Movies in company with fellow filmmaker Rogério Sganzerla. They chose a model of making films and low-cost production and thereby managed to run six feature films in just six months.

Bressane came into exile in London in the early 1970s, but returned to Brazil several years later and made one film after another, using slapstick and debauchery as its main features. An acclaimed film of this period was the provocative Tabu, released in 1982. Critics consider Bressane the most scholarly of the Brazilian film directors, and his work is notable for the diversity of its narrative language. Another feature of his filmography is the comprehensive approach to historical and literary characters. He is also noted by his low-budget, short-time shootings, with an average of 11 to 14 days to make and edit a film.

His film Cleopatra was presented at the Venice Film Festival in 2007, as part of the Mostra Venezia Maestri (Venice Masters Exhibition), as well as being named best film of the 40th Festival de Brasília in November 2007.

== Filmography ==
Key
Indicates a documentary	Indicates a short film

Year	Original title	English release title	Notes
1966	Lima Barreto: Trajetória		Short documentary on Lima Barreto.
1966	Bethânia Bem de Perto: A Propósito de Um Show		Co-directed with Eduardo Escorel. Short documentary and concert film on Brazilian singer Maria Bethânia.
1967	Cara a Cara	Face to Face	
1969	Matou a Família e Foi ao Cinema	Killed the Family and Went to the Movies	
1969	O Anjo Nasceu	The Angel Was Born	
1970	Cuidado Madame		
1970	Barão Olavo, o Horrível	Baron Olavo, the Horrible	
1970	A Família do Barulho		
1971	Memórias de Um Estrangulador de Loiras	Memories of a Strangler of Blondes	
1971	Amor Louco	Crazy Love	
1971	A Fada do Oriente		
1972	Lágrima Pantera		Brazilian-American Co-production.
1973	O Rei do Baralho		
1975	O Monstro Caraíba		
1977	Viola Chinesa	Chinese Viola: My Encounter with Brazilian Cinema	Short documentary.
1978	O Gigante da América	The Giant of America	
1978	Agonia		
1979	Cinema Inocente		
1982	Tabu		
1985	Brás Cubas		
1989	Sermões: A História de Antônio Vieira		Based on the life of António Vieira.
1992	Quem Seria o Feliz Conviva de Isadora Duncan?		Segment of Oswaldianas (1992).
1995	O Mandarim	The Mandarin	Based on the life of Mário Reis.
1997	Miramar		
1999	São Jerônimo		
2001	Dias de Nietzsche em Turim	Days of Nietzsche in Turin	Based on the life of Friedrich Nietzsche.
2003	Filme de Amor	A Love Movie	
2007	Ver Viver Reviver		Short documentary.
2007	Cleópatra	Cleopatra	
2007	Passagem em Ferrara		Short documentary dedicated to Michelangelo Antonioni.
2008	A Erva do Rato	The Herb of the Rat	
2012	Rua Aperana 52	Aperana Street 52	
2012	O Batuque dos Astros	Drumming Beat of the Stars	Documentary on Fernando Pessoa.
2013	Educação Sentimental		
2013	Venice 70: Future Reloaded		Segment director.
2015	Garoto	Kid	
2016	Beduino		
2018	Sedução da Carne	Seduction of the Flesh	
2019	Nietzsche sils Maria Rochedo de Surlej		Co-directed with Rosa Dias and Rodrigo Lima.
2021	Capitu and the Chapter	Capitu e o Capítulo	
2023	The Long Voyage of the Yellow Bus	A Longa Viagem do Ônibus Amarelo	
2023	Rudder of Destiny	Leme do Destino	

== Awards ==
- Venice Film Festival, 2001 (Italy) – Winner of Filmcritica Bastone Bianco Award (Júlio Bressane).
- Love Film won the awards for best film, photography (Walter Carvalho) and soundtrack (Guilherme Vaz), the 36th Festival de Brasília Film in 2003
- Candango won the trophy for best film at the Festival de Brasília, by Tabu (1982) and Miramar (1997)
- Candango won the trophy for best director at the Festival de Brasília, Miramar (1997) and St. Jerome (1999)
- Award for best screenplay to Rosa Maria Dias at the Festival de Brasília by Days of Nietzsche in Turin

== Bibliography ==
- Some (1996)
- Cinemancia (2000)
- Fotodrama (2005)
- Deslimite (2011)
