= Killed the Family and Went to the Movies (1969 film) =

1969 film directed by Júlio Bressane

- Directed by: Júlio Bressane
- Written by: Júlio Bressane
- Starring: Antero de Oliveira; Renata Sorrah; Vanda Lacerda; Paulo Padilha; Rodolfo Arena; Carlos Eduardo Dolabella; Márcia Rodrigues
- Release date: 1969
- Running time: 64 minutes
- Country: Brazil
- Language: Portuguese

Matou a Família e Foi ao Cinema (Killed the Family and Went to the Movies) is a Brazilian film directed by Júlio Bressane and released in 1969.

== Plot ==
The film has several related episodes in which the characters seek death as the apex for their passions.

== Production ==
The film was shot in 16 mm and then enlarged to 35 mm.

== Remake ==
A remake was made in 1991. This version was also written by Bressane but directed by Neville de Almeida.
