= Boca do Lixo =

Popular name for specific neighborhood in São Paulo, Brazil

Boca do Lixo (Portuguese pronunciation: [ˈbokɐ du ˈliʃu], Garbage Mouth) is an area in Luz, downtown São Paulo, Brazil. Boca do Lixo is the popular, unofficial name given to the Santa Ifigênia area between the streets Rua do Triunfo and Rua Vitória. In the 1990s it became known as Cracolândia ("Crack Land"), and was associated with drugs, organised crime and violence.

The area was characterized by its night clubs and sexual services establishments, and was home to a flourishing cinema industry known as Cinema da Boca do Lixo, particularly in the 1970s. Today, Boca is a constantly policed area and crime rate has dramatically fallen.
