= 2001 in Brazil =

Events in the year 2001 in Brazil.

== Incumbents ==
=== Federal government ===
- President: Fernando Henrique Cardoso
- Vice President: Marco Maciel

=== Governors ===
- Acre: Jorge Viana
- Alagoas: Ronaldo Lessa
- Amapa: João Capiberibe
- Amazonas: Amazonino Mendes
- Bahia: César Borges
- Ceará: Tasso Jereissati
- Espírito Santo: José Ignácio Ferreira
- Goiás: Marconi Perillo
- Maranhão: Roseana Sarney
- Mato Grosso: Dante de Oliveira
- Mato Grosso do Sul: José Orcírio Miranda dos Santos
- Minas Gerais: Itamar Franco
- Pará: Almir Gabriel
- Paraíba: José Maranhão
- Paraná: Jaime Lerner
- Pernambuco: Jarbas Vasconcelos
- Piauí:
  - Mão Santa (until 6 November)
  - Kléber Eulálio (9 November-19 November)
  - Hugo Napoleão (from 19 November)
- Rio de Janeiro: Anthony Garotinho
- Rio Grande do Norte: Garibaldi Alves Filho
- Rio Grande do Sul: Olívio Dutra
- Rondônia: José de Abreu Bianco
- Roraima: Neudo Ribeiro Campos
- Santa Catarina: Esperidião Amin
- São Paulo:
  - Mário Covas (till 6 March)
  - Geraldo Alckmin (from 6 March)
- Sergipe: Albano Franco
- Tocantins: José Wilson Siqueira Campos

=== Vice governors ===
- Acre: Edison Simão Cadaxo
- Alagoas: Geraldo Costa Sampaio
- Amapá: Maria Dalva de Souza Figueiredo
- Amazonas: Samuel Assayag Hanan
- Bahia: Otto Alencar
- Ceará: Benedito Clayton Veras Alcântara
- Espírito Santo: Celso José Vasconcelos
- Goiás: Alcides Rodrigues Filho
- Maranhão: José Reinaldo Carneiro Tavares
- Mato Grosso: José Rogério Sales
- Mato Grosso do Sul: Moacir Kohl
- Minas Gerais: Newton Cardoso
- Pará: Hildegardo de Figueiredo Nunes
- Paraíba: Antônio Roberto de Sousa Paulino
- Paraná: Emília de Sales Belinati
- Pernambuco: José Mendonça Bezerra Filho
- Piauí:
  - Osmar Ribeiro de Almeida Júnior (until 6 November)
  - Felipe Mendes de Oliveira (from 19 November)
- Rio de Janeiro: Benedita da Silva
- Rio Grande do Norte: Fernando Freire
- Rio Grande do Sul: Miguel Soldatelli Rossetto
- Rondônia: Miguel de Souza
- Roraima: Francisco Flamarion Portela
- Santa Catarina: Paulo Roberto Bauer
- São Paulo:
  - Geraldo Alckmin (till 6 March)
  - Vacant (from 6 March)
- Sergipe: Benedito de Figueiredo
- Tocantins: João Lisboa da Cruz

== Events ==
=== January ===
- January 11: A flash fire hits the studio of the children's program Xuxa Park, leaving 26 injured; seven being serious. The fire started while Xuxa Meneghel was recording the special carnival program and singing her biggest hit, Ilariê.
- January 12: The third edition of Rock in Rio with performances by Sting, R.E.M., Guns N' Roses, 'N Sync, Iron Maiden, Neil Young, and the Red Hot Chili Peppers.
- January 15: Gol Transportes Aéreos starts operations with a flight from Brasília to São Paulo.

=== February ===
- February 2: The Canadian government suspends imports of Brazilian beef due to mad cow disease.
- February 4: Musician Herbert Vianna is left a paraplegic after his ultralight plane crashed in Mangaratiba, Rio de Janeiro. His wife Lucy Needhan-Vianna is killed in the crash.
- February 19: The First Command of the Capital organizes a major rebellion in São Paulo prisons, leaving 14 inmates dead and 19 correctional officers injured. Until then, it would be the biggest rebellion registered in Brazil.

=== March ===
- March 15: Three explosions on the P-36 platform, the largest oil production platform in the world, in Campos Basin; leaves eleven employees dead.
- March 21: The killing of Lucas Terra in Bahia, allegedly committed by two pastors of the Universal Church of the Kingdom of God.

=== April ===
- April 15: A walkway collapses inside the Estácio de Sá University campus in Barra da Tijuca, West Zone of Rio de Janeiro, injuring 54 people.

=== May ===
- May 17: The electricity rationing program in the Southeast, Central-West, and Northeast regions take effect. Measure was announced by the Federal government to control the Blackout Crisis.
- May 30: Amidst accusations of involvement in the electronic panel violation scandal, Senator Antônio Carlos Magalhães (PFL-BA) resigns from office to avoid his impeachment.

=== July ===
- July 30: Colonel Ubiratan Guimarães is sentenced to 632 years in prison for the death of 102 prisoners in the Carandiru Massacre.

=== August ===
- August 6: 18-year-old Robério Souza de Oliveira shot six students and a teacher with a shotgun at a school in Macaúbas, after the shooting the perpetrator fled and committed suicide.
- August 21: Student Patrícia Abravanel, daughter of presenter and businessman Silvio Santos, is kidnapped in São Paulo. She was released from captivity seven days after the ransom was paid.
- August 30: Presenter and businessman Silvio Santos is kidnapped from his home in Jardim Morumbi, São Paulo after it was invaded by Fernando Dutra Pinto. Pinto led the gang that kidnapped Santos' daughter, Patricia, the week before. After 8 hours of negotiation, Pinto surrendered to police with the arrival of São Paulo Governor Geraldo Alckmin at the scene.

=== September ===
- September 10: Antônio da Costa Santos, mayor of Campinas, is assassinated.
- September 11: Three Brazilians are killed in the September 11 attacks in the United States.

=== November ===
- November 24: A fire at a nightclub leaves seven dead and 197 injured in Belo Horizonte.
- November 26: One hundred and six prisoners escape from the São Paulo House of Detention prison through a dug tunnel; the largest recorded escape in its history.

=== December ===
- December 3: Transbrasil, the third largest airline in Brazil ceases all operations.

== Births ==
=== January ===
- January 9 – Rodrygo, footballer

=== June ===
- June 18 – Gabriel Martinelli, footballer

=== September ===
- September 24 – Jade Picon, social media personality

=== December ===
- December 14 – Luis Henrique, footballer

== Deaths ==
=== January ===
- January 12 –
  - Luiz Bonfá, guitarist and composer (b. 1922)
  - Adhemar da Silva, triple jumper (b. 1927)
- January 20 – Nico Assumpção, bass player (b. 1954)

=== February ===
- February 27 – Walther Moreira Salles, banker and politician (b. 1912)

=== March ===
- March 6 – Mário Covas, then Governor of São Paulo (b. 1930)
- March 8 – Luís Rocha, politician and lawyer (b. 1937)

=== April ===
- April 1 – Eugênio German, chess master (b. 1930)

=== May ===
- May 15 – Juracy Magalhães, military officer and politician (b. 1905)

=== June ===
- June 13 – Marcelo Fromer, guitarist for the band Titãs (b. 1961)
- June 24: Milton Santos, geographer (b. 1926)

=== August ===
- August 10 – Jorge Amado, Brazil's best known modern writer (b. 1912)

=== September ===
- September 10 – Toninho, architect and politician (b. 1952)

=== October ===
- October 9 – Roberto de Oliveira Campos, economist (b. 1917)

=== December ===
- December 29 – Cássia Eller, musician (b. 1962)

== See also ==
- 2001 in Brazilian football
- 2001 in Brazilian television
- List of Brazilian films of 2001
