= 1952 in Brazil =

Events in the year 1952 in Brazil.

== Incumbents ==
=== Federal government ===
- President: Getúlio Vargas
- Vice President: Café Filho

=== Governors ===
- Alagoas: Arnon de Mello
- Amazonas: Álvaro Botelho Maia
- Bahia: Régis Pacheco
- Ceará: Raul Barbosa
- Espírito Santo:
  - Jones dos Santos Neves (until 31 January)
  - Francisco Alves Ataíde (from 31 January)
- Goiás: Pedro Ludovico Teixeira
- Maranhão: Eugênio Barros
- Mato Grosso: Fernando Corrêa da Costa
- Minas Gerais: Juscelino Kubitschek
- Pará: Zacarias de Assumpção
- Paraíba: José Américo de Almeida
- Paraná: Bento Munhoz da Rocha Neto
- Pernambuco:
  - Agamenon Magalhães (until 24 August)
  - Antônio Torres Galvão (from 24 August-12 December)
  - Etelvino Lins de Albuquerque (starting 12 December)
- Piauí: Pedro Freitas
- Rio Grande do Norte: Silvio Piza Pedrosa
- Rio Grande do Sul: Ernesto Dornelles
- Santa Catarina: Irineu Bornhausen
- São Paulo: Lucas Nogueira Garcez
- Sergipe: Arnaldo Rollemberg Garcez

=== Vice governors ===
- Alagoas: Antônio Guedes de Miranda
- Ceará: Stênio Gomes da Silva
- Espírito Santo: Francisco Alves Ataíde
- Goiás: Jonas Ferreira Alves Duarte
- Maranhão: Renato Bayma Archer da Silva
- Mato Grosso: João Leite de Barros
- Minas Gerais: Clóvis Salgado da Gama
- Paraíba: João Fernandes de Lima
- Piauí: Tertuliano Milton Brandão
- Rio de Janeiro: Tarcísio Miranda
- Rio Grande do Norte: Vacant
- São Paulo: Erlindo Salzano
- Sergipe: Edelzio Vieira de Melo

== Events ==
=== February ===
- February 14: Diário de Noite ran a report of mysterious bombs exploding in the city of Porto Alegre since the month of January. In May of the same year, the bomber, 24-year-old radio technician Herbert Rudiger was captured after maiming himself while fabricating another bomb. Rudiger confessed to the police that he was the author of the bombings while in the hospital and said his motive was fun he obtained with the sensationalism of the media.

=== March ===
- 4 March: A crowded steam-powered passenger train derails while crossing a bridge over the Pavuna River near Anchieta station, sending two old wooden carriages broadside onto the adjacent line. A modern high-speed electric freight train travelling in the opposite direction ploughs into the wooden carriages, telescoping them upwards. 119 people are killed and more than 200 are injured, resulting in an outcry prompting a major new investment in Brazilian railways.
- 15 March: The military assistance agreement between Brazil and the United States is signed by the Brazilian Minister of Foreign Affairs, João Neves da Fontoura and American ambassador, Herschel Johnson at the Itamaraty Palace in Rio de Janeiro.

=== April ===
- 28 April: Pan Am Flight 202 crashes in the Amazon Basin approximately 220 nautical miles (410 km) southwest of Carolina, Maranhão. All 50 people on board are killed in the worst-ever accident involving the Boeing 377.

=== June ===
- 20 June: President Getúlio Vargas signs a law, creating the National Bank for Economic and Social Development (BNDES, formerly BNDE).

=== August ===
- 12 August: A Douglas C-47A registered PP-ANH is destroyed after a in-flight fire, causing it to crash near Palmeiras de Goiás. All 24 people on board are killed.

=== October ===
- 14 October: The National Conference of Bishops of Brazil is founded in Rio de Janeiro.
- 29 October: The National Institute of Amazonian Research is created through Decree 31,672.

=== December ===
- 14 December: The city of Paranavaí is founded.

== Arts and culture ==
=== Films ===
- O Canto do Mar, directed by Alberto Cavalcanti.
- Sai da frente, film debut of Amácio Mazzaropi.
- Tico-Tico no Fubá, directed by Adolfo Celi, starring Anselmo Duarte and Tônia Carrero.

=== Music ===
- João Gilberto - "Quando Ela Sai"

=== Television ===
- Sítio do Pica-pau Amarelo, written by Tatiana Belinky and based on the series of novels of same name by Monteiro Lobato.

== Births ==
=== January ===
- 18 January – Túlio Mourão, pianist and composer

=== February ===
- 22 February – Marcos Caruso, author, director, screenwriter and actor

=== May ===
- 10 May – Vanderlei Luxemburgo, professional football coach and former player

=== August ===
- 17 August – Nelson Piquet, racing driver
- 19 August – Milton Hatoum, writer

=== September ===
- 10 September – Paulo Betti, actor

=== December ===
- 14 December – Pedro Collor de Mello, business and brother of former president of Brazil Fernando Collor (died 1994)

== Deaths ==
=== February ===
- 2 February – João Guilherme Fischer, agronomic engineer (born 1876)

== See also ==
- 1952 in Brazilian football
