= List of Brazilian films of 2001 =

A list of films produced in Brazil in 2001 (see 2001 in film). Brazil produced 30 films in 2001.

== 2001 ==
Title	Director	Cast	Genre	Notes
3 Histórias da Bahia	José Araripe Jr., Edyala Iglesias, Sérgio Machado	Sérgio Mamberti, Rita Assemany, Cyria Coentro, Ingra Liberato, Othon Bastos	Drama	
Antônio Dias: O País Inventado	Leila Hipólito	Achille Bonito Oliva, Paulo Sérgio Duarte, Paulo Herkenhoff, Catherine Millet	Documentary	
Artesãos da Morte	Miriam Chnaiderman		Documentary	Short film
Artifícios	Rafael Primot, Flavia Rea	Paulo Autran, Rafael Primot, Marcela Rafea		Short film
As Aventuras de Lucrécio no Mundo da Paquera	Luís Mingau	Pedro Perazzo, Rodrigo Luna, José Carlos Zeqa, Leo Abreu	Comedy	Short film
Atrocidades Maravilhosas	Lula Carvalho, Renato Martins, Pedro Peregrino		Documentary	Short film
Before Take Off	Thiago da Costa	Alan Pontes, Guilherme Biazotto, Marina Velloso, Priscilla Rozenbaum, Adriano Martins, Felipe Cardoso	Drama	Short film
Behind the Sun	Walter Salles	Rodrigo Santoro, José Dumont, Rita Assemany	Drama	Produced by Arthur Cohn
Bellini and the Sphinx	Roberto Santucci	Fábio Assunção, Malu Mader, Maristane Dresch	Crime	
Bufo and Spallanzani	Flavio R. Tambellini	José Mayer, Tony Ramos, Isabel Guéron	Thriller	Co-production with Portugal
Caramuru: A Invenção do Brasil	Guel Arraes	Selton Mello, Camila Pitanga, Deborah Secco	Romantic comedy	
Copacabana	Carla Camurati	Marco Nanini	Drama	
Um Crime Nobre	Walter Lima, Jr.	Ornella Muti, Reginaldo Faria, Alessandra Negrini	Drama	
Days of Nietzsche in Turin	Júlio Bressane	Fernando Eiras	Biographical drama	
Duralex sedlex	Henrique Silveira, Luciana Tanure, Marília Rocha	Aparecida Uemoto Maia, Claudio Manoel Uemoto Maia, Helena Uemoto Maia, José Uemoto Maia, Rosângela Uemoto Maia Schwarzer	Documentary	
Festive Land: Carnaval in Bahia	Carolina Moraes-Liu	Gilberto Gil, Daniela Mercury, Vovô, Roberto Albergaria, Armandinho, Milton Moura	Documentary	
The Happy Cricket	Walbercy Ribas	Vagner Fagundes, Araken Saldanha, Régis Monteiro, Fátima Noya, Letícia Quinto	Animated feature	Spent over 20 years in development
A Hidden Life	Suzana Amaral	Sabrina Greve	Drama	Entered into the 24th Moscow International Film Festival
Maids	Fernando Meirelles, Nando Olival	Cláudia Missura, Graziella Moretto, Lena Roque, Olivia Araújo, Renata Melo, Robson Nunes, Tiago Moraes	Comedy	
Marighella - Retrato Falado do Guerrilheiro	Silvio Tendler		Documentary	About the life of Carlos Marighella
Memórias Póstumas	André Klotzel	Reginaldo Faria, Petrônio Gontijo, Viétia Rocha, Sônia Braga	Comedy drama	Based on The Posthumous Memoirs of Bras Cubas
My Life in Your Hands	José Antônio Garcia	Maria Zilda Bethlem, Caco Ciocler	Drama	
Netto Loses His Soul	Tabajara Ruas, Beto Souza	Werner Schünemann	War film	Depicts Antônio de Sousa Neto in the Paraguayan War
Possible Loves	Sandra Werneck	Murilo Benício, Carolina Ferraz	Romantic comedy	
A Samba for Sherlock	Miguel Faria, Jr.	Joaquim de Almeida, Marco Nanini, Anthony O'Donnell, Maria de Medeiros	Comedy	Co-production with Portugal
Samba Riachão	Jorge Alfredo		Documentary	
Timor Lorosae: The Unseen Massacre	Lucélia Santos	Lucélia Santos	Documentary	
To the Left of the Father	Luiz Fernando Carvalho	Selton Mello, Raul Cortez, Juliana Carneiro da Cunha, Simone Spoladore, Leonardo Medeiros, Caio Blat	Drama	
The Trespasser	Beto Brant	Marco Ricca, Alexandre Borges, Paulo Miklos, Mariana Ximenes, Malu Mader	Thriller	
Tropical Dreams	André Sturm	Carolina Kasting, Bruno Giordano	Drama	
Window of the Soul	João Jardim, Walter Carvalho	José Saramago, Hermeto Pascoal, Oliver Sacks, Wim Wenders	Documentary	
Xuxa e os Duendes	Paulo Sérgio de Almeida, Rogério Gomes, Márcio Vito	Xuxa, Gugu Liberato, Angélica	Children's film	

== See also ==
- 2001 in Brazil
- 2001 in Brazilian television
