= R.S.V.P. (2002 film) =

- Film poster
- Directed by: Mark Anthony Galluzzo
- Written by: Mark Anthony Galluzzo
- Produced by: Mark Anthony Galluzzo
- Starring: Rick Otto; Lucas Babin; Glenn Quinn; Brandi Andres; Jason Mewes; Reno Wilson; Majandra Delfino
- Cinematography: Mark Anthony Galluzzo; Christian Grosselfinger; Thom Stukas
- Edited by: Adam P. Scott
- Music by: Michael Muhlfriedel
- Distributed by: Lions Gate Entertainment
- Release date: 2002
- Running time: 100 minutes
- Country: United States
- Language: English

R.S.V.P. is a 2002 American dark comedy suspense film written and directed by Mark Anthony Galluzzo. The film features Glenn Quinn in his final role.

== Plot ==
During a post-graduation party of a college student obsessed with serial killers, the guests are murdered one by one.

== Cast ==
- James M. Churchman as The Quick Brown Fox (as Jim Churchman)
- Sharon Bruneau as Female Victim
- Scott Workman as Male Victim
- A. Scott as Agent Hanna
- C.B. Allen as Officer Gaunt
- Rich Kelly as Detective Thomas
- Glenn Quinn as Prof. Hal Evans, PhD
- Rick Otto as Nick 'The Prick' Collier
- Lucas Babin as Jimmy Franklin
- Brandi Andres as Jordan
- Reno Wilson as Garrett
- Jeanne Chinn as Cricket
- Bruce Michael Paine as Bartender
- Jason Mewes as Terry
- Daniel Joseph as John Skyles
- Jonathan Banks as Walter Franklin
- Grace Zabriskie as Mary Franklin
- Nora Zehetner as Leigh Franklin
- Majandra Delfino as Callie
- Tommy Hoe as Uncle Atticus, MD.
- Fernando Quevedo as Xavier
- Lindsay Truxell as Sexy Motorist

== Genre ==
The film was marketed as a dark comedy. The Austin Chronicle described it as a suspense film.

== Production ==
Funding came from investors whose deal fell through on Mark Anthony Galluzzo's previous film. Galluzzo, who wrote, produced, and directed the film, said he performed many roles during production both out of necessity and because of his background working various jobs on other projects.

== Reception ==
Rotten Tomatoes, a review aggregator, reports that 20% of five surveyed critics gave the film a positive review; the average rating is 4.2/10. Scott Foundas of Variety called it a "loud, crass redo of Hitchcock's Rope" with unlikable characters. Kimberley Jones wrote in The Austin Chronicle that R.S.V.P.'s "inability to stick to a tone makes for a wildly uneven film, but also a mostly entertaining one, too".

R.S.V.P. won best film at the Malibu Film Festival.
