= Araguaia (TV series) =

Brazilian telenovela

- Also known as: Rio del destino
- Genre: Telenovela; Adventure
- Written by: Jackie Vellego; Renato Modesto; Julio Fischer; Alessandro Marson; Fausto Galvão
- Directed by: Marcos Schechtman; Marcelo Travesso
- Starring: Murilo Rosa; Milena Toscano; Cléo Pires; Laura Cardoso; Thiago Fragoso; Júlia Lemmertz; Suzana Pires; Lima Duarte
- Opening theme: "Companheiro" by Maria Eugênia; "Agua Misteriosa" by La Shica (international version)
- Composers: Hans Donner; Alexandre Pit Ribeiro; Roberto Stein
- Country of origin: Brazil
- Original language: Portuguese
- No. of episodes: 166; 105 (international version)

Production
- Editors: George Hamilton; Carlos Thadeu; Edson Mello; Roberto Mariano
- Camera setup: Multi-camera
- Running time: 50 minutes

Original release
- Network: Globo
- Release: September 27, 2010 – April 8, 2011

Araguaia (English: Destiny River (Note: Official name in English.)) is a Brazilian supernatural telenovela that ran on TV Globo from September 27, 2010 to April 8, 2011.

Created by Walther Negrão and co-written by Jackie Vellego, Renato Modesto, Julio Fischer, Alessandro Marson and Fausto Galvão. Directed by Marcos Schechtman and Marcelo Travesso.

Starring Cléo Pires, Murilo Rosa, Milena Toscano, Thiago Fragoso, Júlia Lemmertz and Lima Duarte.

In 2012, the show was nominated for the International Emmy Award for Best Telenovela.

== Plot ==
=== First phase ===
In 1845, before industrialization, women had to do everything to protect what they owned as they did not depend so much in men. One day an indigenous tribe, Karuê, launched an attack on the women's homestead and rob and grab their properties. Many are killed and Apoena, one of the attackers rescues Antonîa, a teenager and decides to take her to his community. Through the ventures, Antonîa and Apoena fall in love in and hence, she becomes pregnant. On arriving among the Karuê community, Antonîa's state (pregnancy) awakens Larú's hatred and therefore casts a curse on all Antonîa and Apoena's male offspring. The children die under mysterious circumstances on the banks of Araguaia River.

=== Second phase ===
In the 21st century, Fernando (Edson Celulari) receives the news that his mother Antoninha (Regina Duarte) is critically ill and nearing death. He sets a journey back to Araguaia together with his wife, son and her adoptive mother; Estela, Solano and Mariquita respectively. On arrival Antonîa dies after begging Fernando to take away his son away from Araguaia as the curse inflected by Larú is still effective. With the outgoing nature of Fernando he decides to sell Solano's horse in order to find money to take Estela and he back to Rio de Janeiro. He unfortunately dies on the eve of their supposed journey. Estela develops feelings for Solano while Solano has an irresistible attraction to Estela. A love story between Estela (Cleo Pires) a Karuê last female descendant and Solano (Murilo Rosa), the last descendant of Apoena and Antonia. This will put Estela on a quest of fulfilling the curse or living her own love story. The situation complicates when she becomes pregnant with Solano's son who is also affected by the curse. They must fight against all odds in order to get rid of the curse.

== Cast ==
Actor	Character
Murilo Rosa	Solano Rangel
Milena Toscano	Manuela Martinez
Lima Duarte	Max Martinez
Cléo Pires	Estela Rangel (Estrela Karue)
Laura Cardoso	Mariquita (Maria Quitéria)
Júlia Lemmertz	Amélia Martinez
Thiago Fragoso	Vitor Vilar
Mariana Rios	Nancy Santos
Suzana Pires	Janaína Santos Martinez
Raphael Viana	Frederico Martinez (Fred)
Suyane Moreira	Iaru
Eva Wilma	Beatriz Cardoso (Pierina)
Emílio Orciollo Netto	Neca Tenório
Maria Joana	Maria da Glória Mourão (Sargento Mourão)
Thaís Garayp	Terê Tenório
Flávia Guedes	Aspásia
Henri Castelli	Rudy
Juca de Oliveira	Gabriel (Cabo de Esquadra)
Tânia Alves	Pérola Simões
Otávio Augusto	Padre Emílio
Nando Cunha	Bucéfalo Almeida (Pimpinela)
Ângelo Antônio	Geraldo Lutti Filho
Paula Pereira	Isadora de Almeida Lutti (Dora)
Cinara Leal	Safira Simões
Bruna Marquezine	Terezinha
Neusa Borges	Ivete Valadares
Gésio Amadeu	Cirso Simões
Nanda Lisboa	Ametista Simões
Raquel Villar	Esmeralda Simões
Turíbio Ruiz	Ruriá Karuê
Ana Lima	Lenita
Thiago Oliveira	Tavinho
Yunes Chami	Mamed Mascate
Eduardo Coutinho	Dr. Ricardo
Luciano Scalioni	Bruno Santos
Ricardo Castro	Caroço
Luciana Carinielle	Lourdinha
Christovam Netto	Marreta
Adílson Maghá	Eugênio (Genão)
Brenda Diniz	Maria
Cadu Paschoal	Pedro
Douglas Moreira	André
Frederico Wolkmann	Tomé
Laura Barreto	Madalena
Luigi Matheus	Mateus
Roberta Piragibe	Verônica
Alice Motta	Antônia Rangel
Diogo Oliveira	Apoena Karuê
Regina Duarte	Antoninha Rangel
Edson Celulari	Fernando Rangel

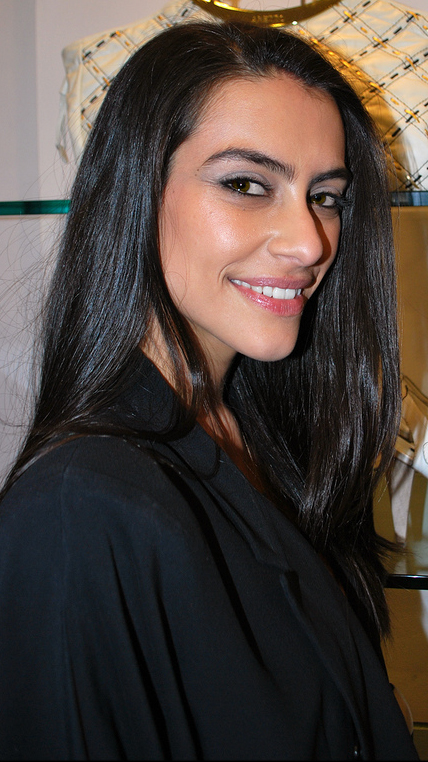
Cléo Pires is Estela.

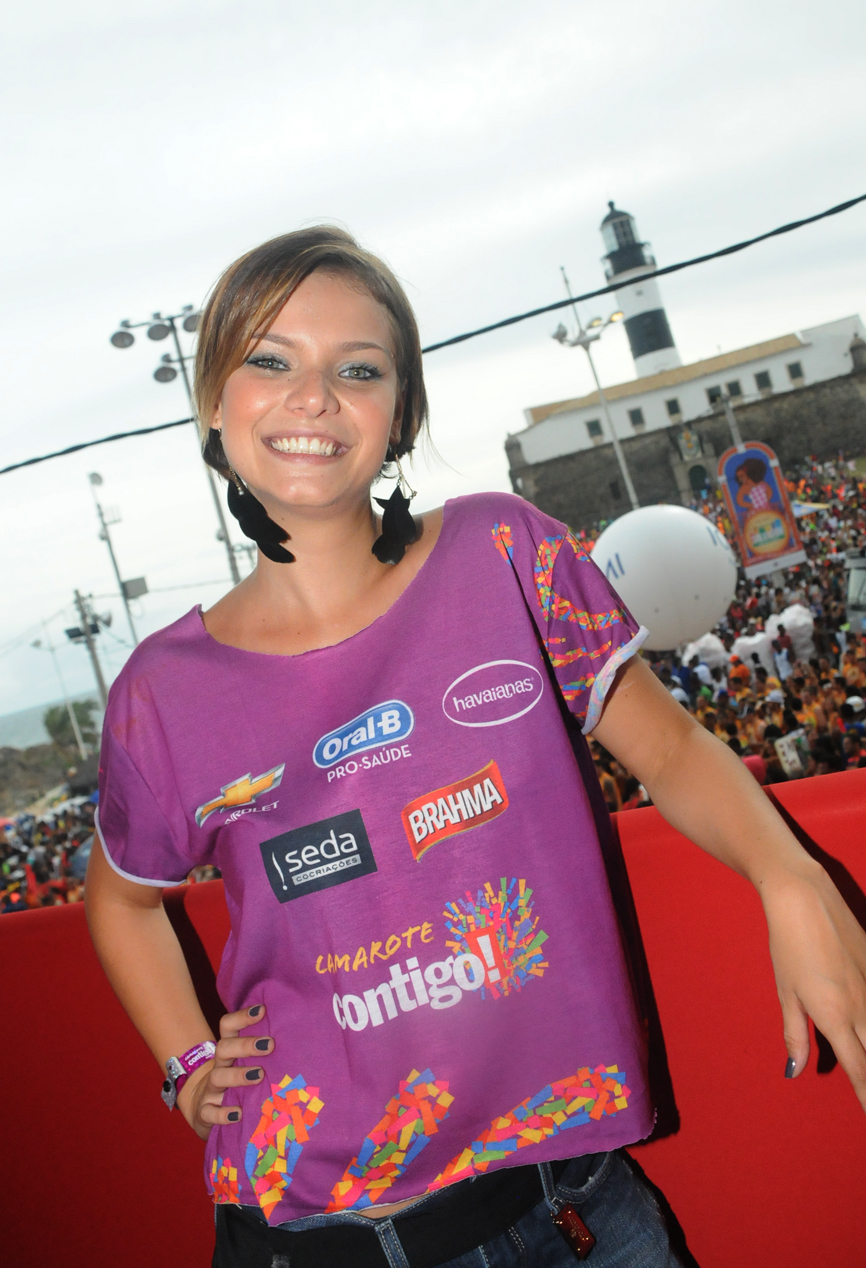
Milena Toscano is Manuela.

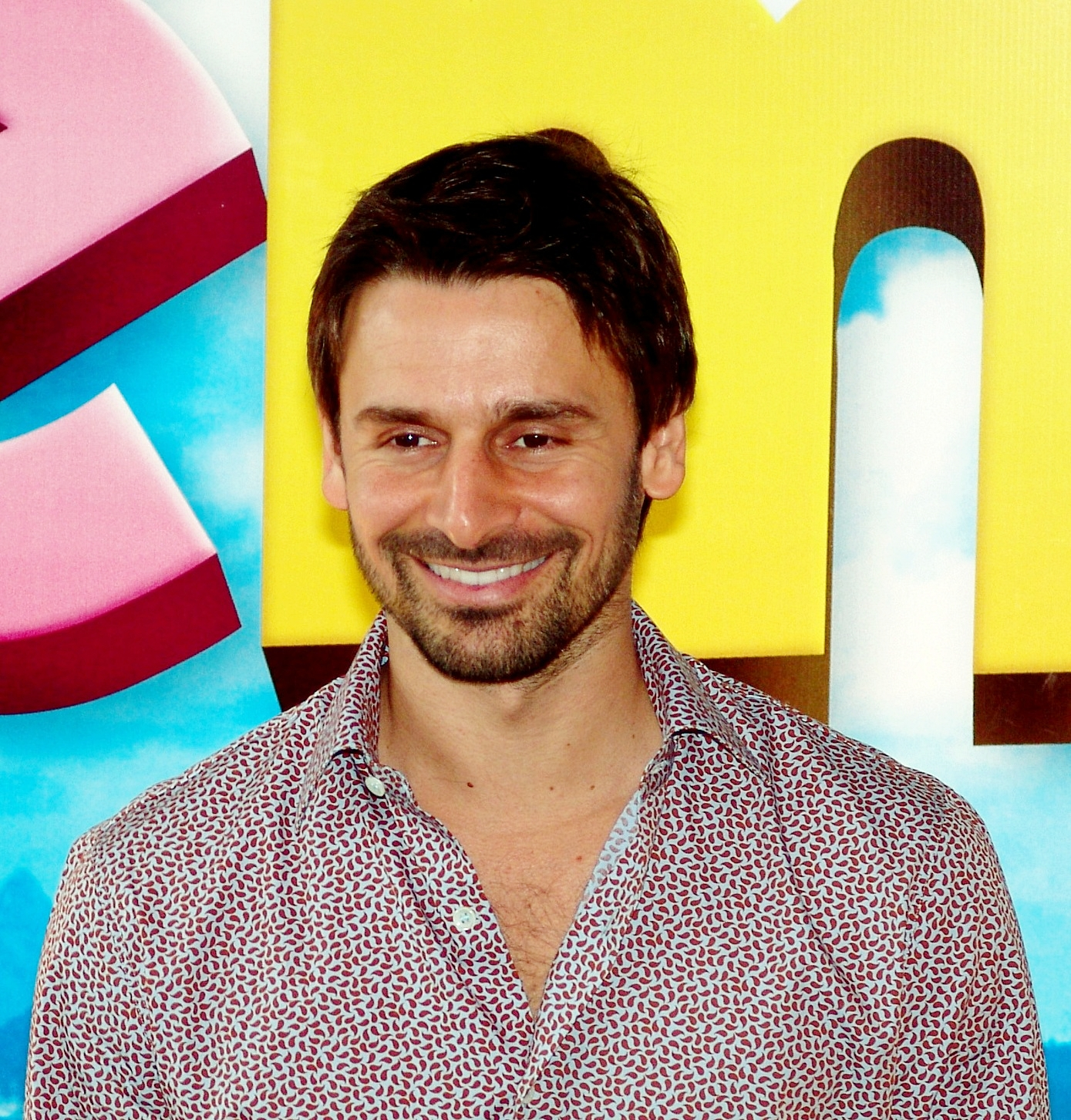
Murilo Rosa is Solano.

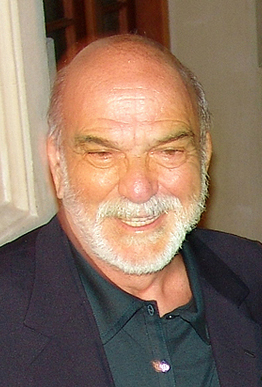
Lima Duarte is Max.

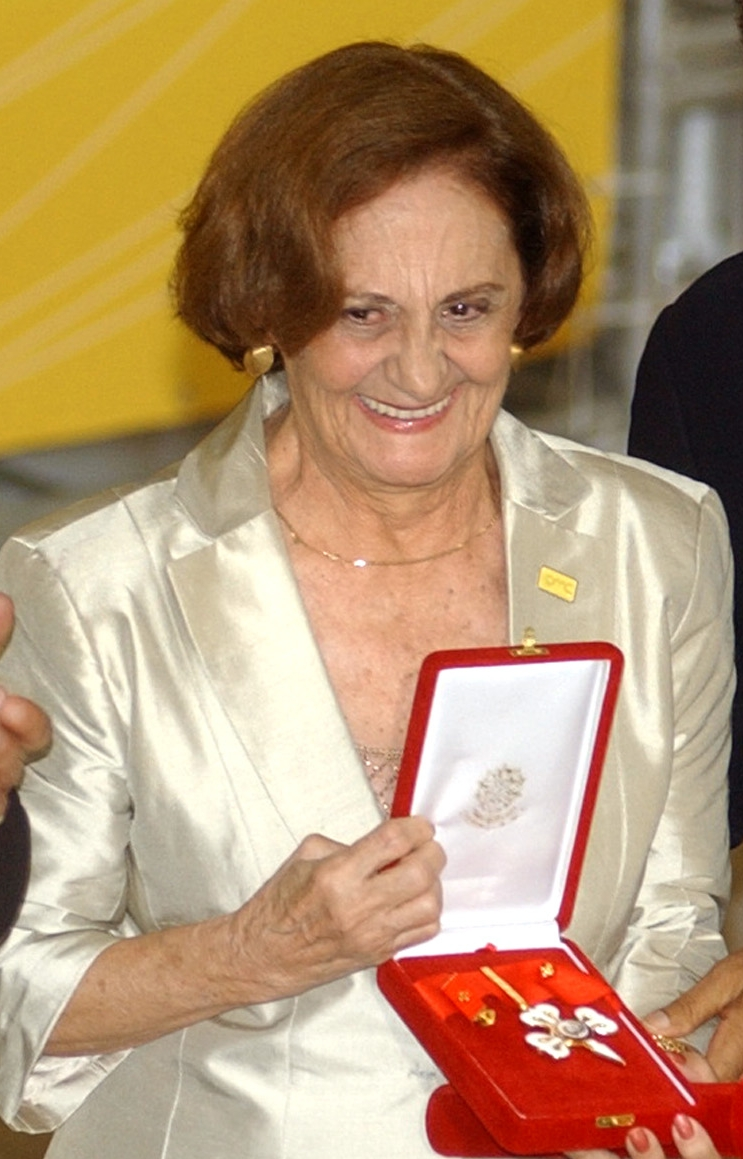
Laura Cardoso is Mariquita.

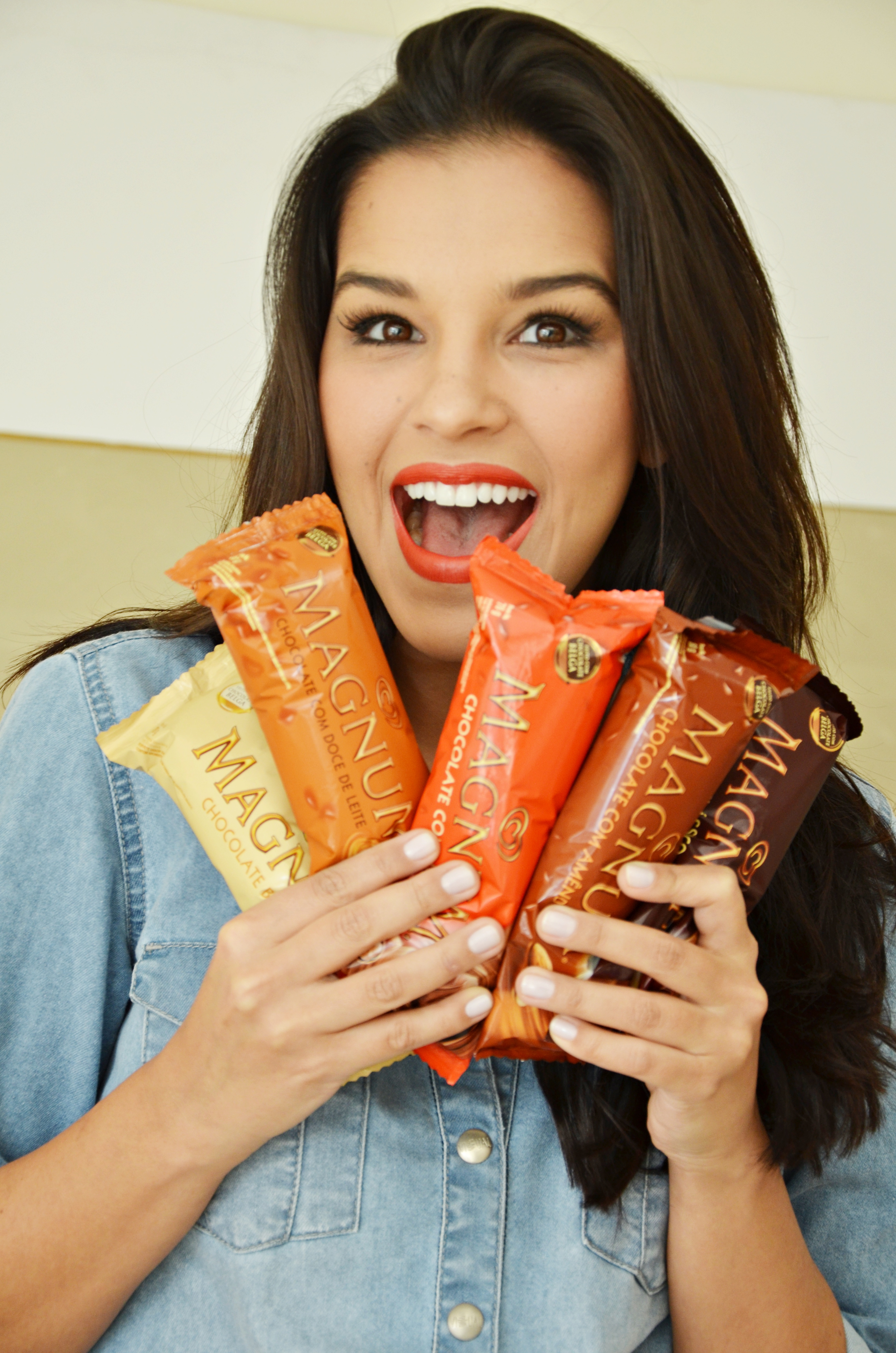
Mariana Rios is Nancy.

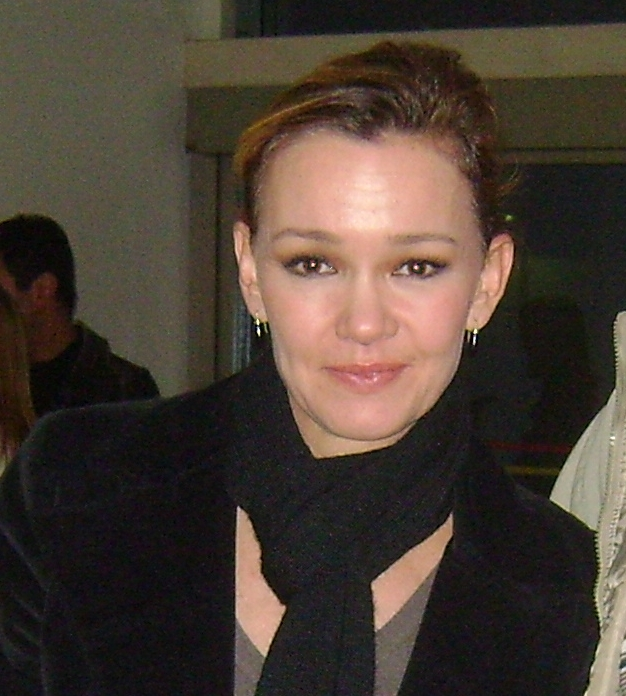
Júlia Lemmertz is Maria Amélia.

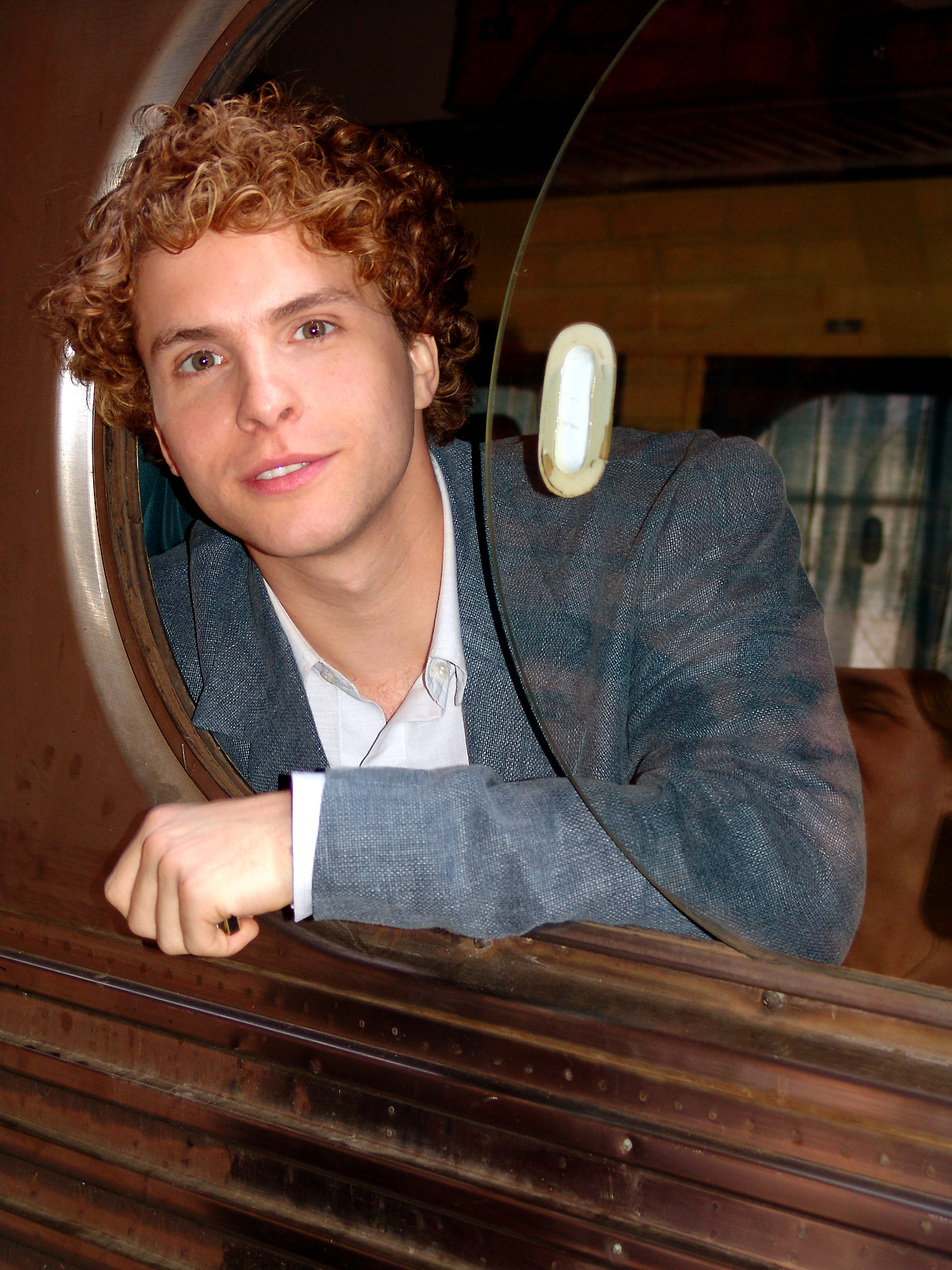
Thiago Fragoso is Víctor.

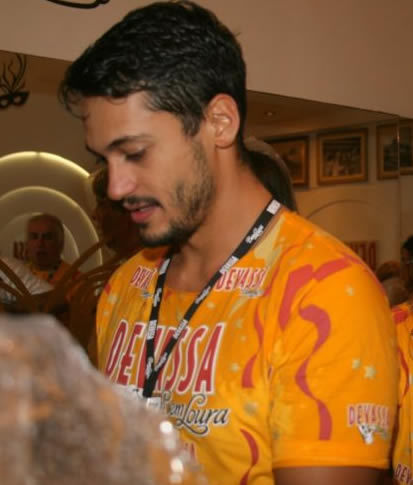
Raphael Viana is Frederico.

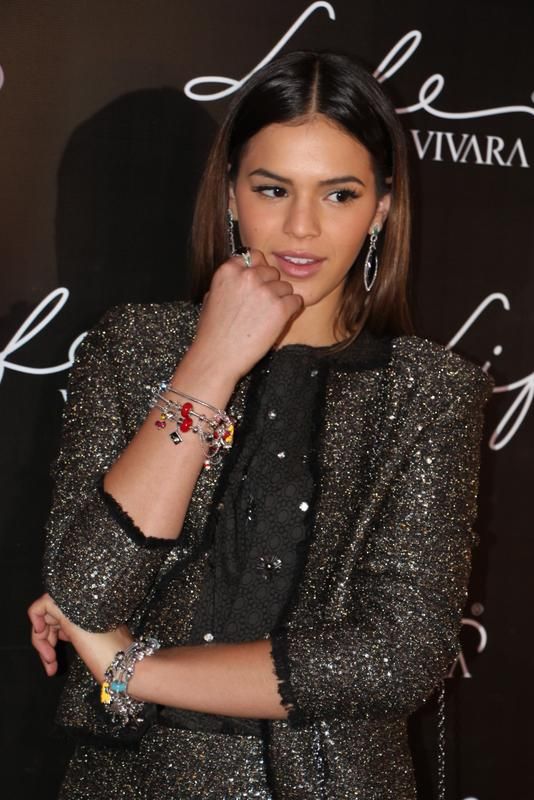
Bruna Marquezine is Terezinha.

== Awards and nominations ==
Year	Award	Category	Recipient	Result	Ref
2011	Prêmio Extra de TV	Best novela	Araguaia	Nominated	
2011	Prêmio Extra de TV	Best Actress	Cléo Pires	Nominated	
