= Supermax (Brazilian TV series) =

Brazilian television series

- Genre: Horror; Action; Thriller; Science fiction Supernatural fiction
- Created by: José Alvarenga Jr. Fernando Bonassi; Marçal Aquino
- Based on: Dead Set
- Screenplay by: Fernando Bonassi; Marçal Aquino; Carolina Kotscho; Bráulio Mantovani; Dennison Ramalho; Juliana Rojas; Raphael Draccon; Raphael Montes
- Directed by: José Alvarenga Jr.
- Starring: Mariana Ximenes; Cléo Pires; Erom Cordeiro; Bruno Belarmino; Nicolas Trevijano; Ademir Emboava; Maria Clara Spinelli; Rui Ricardo Dias; Fabiana Gugli; Mário César Camargo; Márcio Fecher
- Country of origin: Brazil
- Original language: Portuguese
- No. of seasons: 1
- No. of episodes: 12

Production
- Production location: Rio de Janeiro
- Camera setup: Multi-camera
- Running time: 45 minutes
- Production company: Estúdios Globo

Original release
- Network: Rede Globo
- Release: 20 September – 13 December 2016

Related
- Dead Set

Supermax is a Brazilian television series produced by Rede Globo that debuted on September 20, 2016, with an expected total of 12 episodes to be aired. The show was created by José Alvarenga Jr., Marcal Aquino and Fernando Bonassi. The latter two also wrote the script alongside Carolina Kotscho, Braulio Mantovani, Dennison Ramalho, Juliana Rojas, Raphael Draccon and Rafael Montes while José Eduardo Belmonte, Rafael Miranda and Alvarenga helm the directing team.

In 2017, the series was nominated for the Seoul International Drama Awards in Best Series and Best Author Categories.

== Production ==
The writing process of the series took place in the writer's room format in which the writers come together intensively for the creation and development of scripts. According to Carolina Kotscho, they had considerable freedom in writing: "we wrote without any limit. We imagined that eventually this limit would come, but it didn't. This was a grateful surprise!" According to Raphael Montes, one of the writers, Globo gave total freedom to the staff: "I remember a discussion in which we started to throw ideas and we said that this would never be aired, but they did film it! It was our will, the creation's, the direction's, the team's and Globo's itself to make something different, that has known and identifiable elements by the general public but at the same time innovating."

The creator and director José Alvarenga defined the series as a crossing of various genres; ranging from police thriller, horror, terror and suspense to romance. The series was inspired by the first season of True Detective, as well as other similar themed shows such as The Walking Dead, American Horror Story, Supernatural, The Hunger Games and Lost. To simulate the feel of a reality show as the plot demands, Alvarenga borrowed nine camera operators from Big Brother Brazil. The fictional 800 m^{2} prison set, built in Estúdios Globo, was inspired from Alcatraz Prison.

The casting aimed for names unknown to the general public. It also had a unique isolating element compared to other studios of Globo Studios, to keep those involved in the tense and sombre mood of the plot. It involved the knowledge of how to react to different scenes, like amputating a leg in cold blood, being strangled or finding an aberration, an unusual experience for Brazilian actors who were more used to drama and melodrama. Denisson Ramalho, a writer who specialises in horror movies, had said that "it is the most 'from hell' Brazilian TV series of all time".

== Release ==
The series was expected to be released on October 2, 2015, after the end of Verdades Secretas. The series had its debut postponed to 2016 due to the advertising market being in a bad economic time.

=== International version ===
An international version for Hispanic channels is also expected to be produced in Spanish, with Argentine filmmaker Daniel Burman as the director and Bruno Gagliasso starring as a transgender character.

== Plot ==
Mixing fiction and reality, the series chronicles the journey of 12 participants (7 men and 5 women) in a reality show taking place at a disabled maximum security prison located in the Amazon rain forest. Each participant are not chosen by chance but have one thing in common: each of them committed a serious crime.

All goes well on the first day of confinement until the production team disappears, leaving them to their own devices, with macabre and supernatural events occurring within the prison. Only one of them will win the prize of R$2 million, but they will have to leave the place alive.

== Episodes ==
No.	Original title	Original release date	Brazil viewers (Note: each point is equivalent to 69,400 households in the Greater São Paulo area and 43,300 in the Greater Rio de Janeiro area)
1	"Episode 1"	20 September 2016	14.9
12 people with varied problems with the law are selected to take part of a reality show in an isolated maximum security prison in the middle of the Amazon rainforest, competing for the ultimate prize of R$ 2 million. While a series of short videos introducing the participants are shown, Pedro Bial welcomes the team and explains some of the rules: the winner of every test is allowed to choose when, what and who is going to eat; when a certain sound goes off, everybody has 5 minutes to get back to their cells, or else they are eliminated; there is no form of contact with the outside world other than a red telephone that can only be used in case of emergencies, and whose user will be automatically eliminated. Bial asks the participants to pick up a stick from a hand hanging from a wall. The one who takes the short stick will have a secret revealed to everyone. Diana is the one and it is revealed that she shot her husband dead amidst a discussion. Later, they enjoy a party prepared by the production team. Some chat about their lives before the program and some take the time to explore the facilities. Sérgio and Artur provoke each other and almost start a fight, but José Augusto reminds them that fighting is punished with elimination. In the next morning, they awake to their first test, in which they are all confined inside a metallic box that gets gradually hotter. Artur and Sérgio are the last men standing. They provoke each other again and start a fight.
2	"Episode 2"	27 September 2016	12.9
Sérgio emerges as the winner of the fight and attempts to open the pantry, but his fingerprints won't work. Meanwhile, Artur forces the cage door open and activates the padlock with his fingerprint. He is then automatically set as the new leader - even though Sérgio won the fight, he forgot to put Artur's hands at the padlock before his own - the rules state that the winner is the last one to activate the door. Later, using his powers as the leader, Artur denies food to Sérgio and Mário, raising tensions among the participants. It is revealed that Artur was a cocaine addict, which eventually ended his football career and got him arrested. Sérgio also mentions a robbery of a gas station of which he supposedly took part. As days pass, the contestants suspect that they were abandoned by the program's production crew. Bial no longer contacts them, no punishment was applied to the ones who engaged in physical fights and no test was set to determine the next leader, even after Artur's fingerprints stopped working at the pantry's padlock. However, the prison's audio system eventually announces a new leader test.
3	"Episode 3"	4 October 2016	13.0
The group head to the test location and find out it was just a false alarm. They also try to break the pantry's armored window, to no avail. They agree they were abandoned and decide to elect a new leader on their own. As they realize Dante is missing, they form two groups to search for him. Meanwhile, Luisão reveals to Bruna how he punched a training partner to death while having an hallucination in which he was in the middle of an UFC match. Bruna starts questioning him how it felt to see someone die while images of her killing a sick older relative by injecting something in her veins are shown. Luisão grabs her by the throat and leaves, disturbed. Meanwhile, Diana pressures Nando to reveal his crime. He recalls catching his superior in suspicious physical contact with a visibly upset young acolyte and cries. Janette and Luisão find some macabre objects by a red-painted wall. The group later reunites by the dinner hall and discuss their findings. Suddenly, the pantry door opens and they quickly take all of its contents, assuming it as a sign that the production team is still in control of the prison. As the alarm forces them back to their cells, they spot a disturbed Dante with several injuries and tattoos all over his body. Before they can ask him anything, the final alarm goes off and they rush to their cells.
4	"Episode 4"	18 October 2016	11.0
Timóteo checks Dante's wounds. The boy tells his colleagues of how he was cruising the prison's undergrounds alone until he hears of a woman screaming. He says he was suddenly hit in the head and passed out. Later, he awoke outside of the prison, next to some indigenous people. He rushes back inside but was knocked out again. He ends up awake at his cell. Meanwhile, as the rest of the group wait for further instructions from the production crew, they discover that the facility's ventilation system was cut off. Sérgio and Luisão decide to search for a way out and force a traumatized Dante to accompany them since he allegedly made it out and back. On their way, Dante has a vision and runs back in terror while having a memory of how he murdered his own older brother, who was quadriplegic due to drunk driving. According to him, he did it at the brother's request. Later, Dante confesses he cut himself and invented the whole story so that the production team would intervene and possibly eliminate some contestants, suspecting they hurt him. Meanwhile, Cecília falls ill, Luisão and Janette are trapped inside the pantry and Nando has an hallucination in which he has both legs severed as he is surrounded by three demoniac, child-like creatures.
5	"Episode 5"	25 October 2016	10.6
6	"Episode 6"	1 November 2016	10.3
7	"Episode 7"	8 November 2016	09.7
8	"Episode 8"	15 November 2016	12.8
9	"Episode 9"	22 November 2016	09.5
10	"Episode 10"	29 November 2016	09.0
11	"Episode 11"	6 December 2016	09.3
12	"Episode 12"	13 December 2016	09.0

== Cast ==
=== Main cast ===
- Mariana Ximenes as Bruna, a nurse fired from a hospital where she used to take care of terminal patients.
- Erom Cordeiro as Sérgio, a police captain suspended for a crime he says he didn't commit.
- Cléo Pires as Sabrina Toledo, a psychologist who was once kidnapped and spent a few months in captivity.
- Bruno Belarmino as Luisão, a former MMA fighter that is constantly affected by a recurring guilt and spends time trying to control his anger and violence.
- Nicolas Trevijano as Father Nando, who dedicated most of his life to the Church, and considers his suspension unfair.
- Maria Clara Spinelli as Janette, owner of a chain of beauty salons who had a miserable childhood with her alcoholic and violent father.
- Ravel Andrade as Dante, the youngest participant and an enthusiast for obscure cults.
- Rui Ricardo Dias as Artur, a former football player who still believes to be active.
- Fabiana Gugli as Diana, a housewife who recently lost her husband.
- Mário César Camargo as Dr. Timóteo, a reformed Army physician.
- Vânia de Brito as Cecília Damasceno, a woman that reached Rio de Janeiro's elite, but is now close to misery following the death of her husband and son.
- Ademir Emboava as José Augusto, an economist linked to politicians who acted as a fund raiser for a political party.
- Márcio Fecher as Nonato/Baal, one of the people who worked at the construction of the prison. He used to be a pastor, but now lives underneath the prison with several other women.

=== Guest stars ===
- Pedro Bial as himself.

== Awards and nominations ==
- 2016 Troféu APCA - Nominated for Best Series and Best Director.
- 2016 Prêmio Extra de Televisão - Nominated for Best Series.
- 2017 Seoul International Drama Awards - Nominated Best Series and Best Author Categories.
- 2018 Platino Awards - Best Actress in a Series for Mariana Ximenes (Pending)
- 2018 Platino Awards - Best Series Actor for Erom Cordeiro (Pending)
