= Paula Pereira (actress) =

Brazilian actress (born 1967)

- Born: Paula Pereira de Bulhões de Carvalho; December 28, 1967 (age 57); Salvador, Bahia, Brazil
- Occupation: Actress
- Spouse: Marcos Schechtman
- Children: 2

Paula Pereira de Bulhões de Carvalho (born December 28, 1967 in Salvador, Bahia) is a Brazilian actress.

She is married to the director Marcos Schechtman, with whom he has two children, Júlia and Daniel.

== Career ==
Television
Year	Title	Role	Notes
1989	Kananga do Japão		Cameo
1993	Guerra sem Fim		Cameo
2001	O Clone	Creuza	Cameo
2004	Celebridade	Vanda Guimarães	Cameo
2004	Malhação	Silvinha	Cameo
2005	América	Déia	
2007	Amazônia, de Galvez a Chico Mendes	Maroca	
2007	Casos e Acasos	woman who separates from husband	Episode: "Pilot"
2008	Casos e Acasos	Amanda	Episode: "O Bombeiro, o Furto e a Foto"
2009	India – A Love Story	Durga	
2010	Araguaia	Isadora de Almeida Lutti (Dora)	
2012	Salve Jorge	Nilcéia Ribeiro	
