= América (Brazilian TV series) =

Brazilian telenovela by Glória Perez

- Genre: Telenovela
- Created by: Glória Perez
- Directed by: Jayme Monjardim; Marcos Schechtman
- Starring: Deborah Secco; Murilo Benício; Caco Ciocler; Gabriela Duarte; Eliane Giardini; Edson Celulari; Camila Morgado; Christiane Torloni; Marcelo Novaes
- Opening theme: "Órfãos do Paraíso" Milton Nascimento feat. Sagrado Coração da Terra (phase 1); "Soy loco por ti América" by Ivete Sangalo (phase 2)
- Country of origin: Brazil
- Original languages: Portuguese; English (Note: Some lines); Spanish (Note: Some lines)
- No. of seasons: 1
- No. of episodes: 203

Production
- Production locations: Rio de Janeiro, Barretos, Brazil; Miami Beach, USA
- Camera setup: Multi-camera
- Running time: 50 minutes

Original release
- Network: TV Globo
- Release: 14 March – 4 November 2005

América is a Brazilian telenovela that aired on TV Globo from 14 March to 4 November 2005. It was written by Glória Perez and directed by Jayme Monjardim and Marcos Schechtman. The telenovela focused on the life of an illegal immigrant to the United States of America and the lives of those she left behind in Brazil. It stars Deborah Secco and Murilo Benício.

In the United States, Telemundo aired a Spanish-dubbed version of América in 2009.

== Plot ==
=== Main plot ===
Sol and Tião are born to different social backgrounds—she to a poor suburban family in Rio, and him to an even poorer family who raised cattle in West São Paulo State. They eventually meet, due to unlikely circumstances, but part again, as she has set as her ultimate priority to reach the United States or bust. While she comes to the U.S. to live as an illegal immigrant, he remains in Brazil and, despite many trials and tribulations, he becomes a successful rodeo cowboy.

=== Subplots ===
América has several secondary plots about a variety of compelling characters. These, for the most part, take place in four locales: Vila Isabel, a middle-class neighborhood in Rio de Janeiro; Boiadeiros, a fictional town in West São Paulo State; the home of a rich family in Rio; and Miami. Various characters from each subplots often meet each other due to character linkages within the story.

The main subplots were:

- A love triangle involving Feitosa, a man who worked with pets, his girlfriend Islene (who happened to have a blind daughter from a previous relationship) and Creusa (a virginal woman who turned out to be too lustful).
- The problems and achievements of a blind man, Jatobá, trying to live with his disability in a country with no infrastructure for the visually impaired. He is engaged to a non-blind woman.
- The mischievous Alex and Djanira, smugglers and "coyotes".
- The love life of Glauco, a 50-year-old businessman married to a kleptomaniac woman that strives for a divorce in order to marry her lover (but he later leaves both for a 19-year-old girl).
- The complicated relationship between a middle-class American professor, Edward Talbot, and his rich girlfriend, May, who does social work at a ghetto school in Miami. Due to fan demand, the author of the soap opera changed its ending so Edward ends up marrying the main character, Sol.
- The lives of several illegal immigrants living in a boarding house in Miami kept by a Mexican woman, with Brazilian roots, named Consuelo.
- The thriving Brazil rodeo culture. Rodeo is a traditional sport in many countries in the Americas, with influences from the history of Mexican and Brazilian vaqueros or vaqueiros (cowboys) and American cowboys.

== Cast ==
| Actor | Character |
|---|---|
| Deborah Secco | Marisol de Oliveira "Sol" |
| Murilo Benício | Sebastião da Silva Higino "Tião" |
| Caco Ciocler | Edward Talbot "Ed" |
| Gabriela Duarte | Simone Garcia Menezes Higino |
| Camila Morgado | Miss May |
| Thiago Lacerda | Alexander Camargo "Alex" |
| Eliane Giardini | Viúva Neuta |
| Edson Celulari | Glauco Simões Lopes Prado |
| Christiane Torloni | Haydée Pamplona Lopes Prado |
| Marcelo Novaes | Genivaldo da Silva Higino |
| Mariana Ximenes | Raíssa |
| Murilo Rosa | Dinho |
| Juliana Paes | Creusa |
| Roberto Bomfim | Jota Abdalla |
| Lúcia Veríssimo | Gil Madureira |
| Cláudia Jimenez | Consuelo Torres Serrano |
| Paulo Goulart | Mariano de Oliveira |
| Jandira Martini | Odaleia de Oliveira |
| Nívea Maria | Maria José Higino |
| Francisco Cuoco | José da Silva Higino |
| Betty Faria | Djanira Pimenta |
| Luís Melo | Ramiro |
| Humberto Martins | Laerte Villa Nova |
| Daniela Escobar | Irene Villa Nova |
| Matheus Nachtergaele | Carreirinha |
| Cléo Pires | Lurdes Tupã do Nascimento "Lurdinha" |
| Bruno Gagliasso | Roberto Sinval Villa Nova Júnior |
| Erom Cordeiro | Zeca |
| Totia Meireles | Vera Tupã do Nascimento |
| Marcos Frota | Pedro Jatobá |
| Cissa Guimarães | Nina |
| Chico Diaz | Acácio da Silva Higino |
| Regina Maria Dourado | Graça |
| Neusa Borges | Diva Feitosa |
| Ailton Graça | Feitosa |
| Paula Burlamaqui | Islene |
| Walter Breda | Gomes |
| Eva Todor | Miss Jane |
| Reginaldo Faria | Adalberto |
| Bete Mendes | Fátima |
| Floriano Peixoto | Tony |
| Sílvia Buarque | Maria Elis |
| Guilherme Karan | Geraldito |
| Rosi Campos | Mercedes |
| Victor Fasano | James |
| José Dumont | Carlos Manuel de Andrade "Bóia" |
| Samara Felippo | Maria Odete "Detinha" |
| Marisol Ribeiro | Kerry Villa Nova |
| Rodrigo Faro | Neto |
| Simone Spoladore | Heloísa |
| Cris Vianna | Drica |
| Eri Johnson | Waldomiro |
| Paula Pereira | Déia |
| Raul Gazolla | Helinho |
| Fernanda Paes Leme | Rosário |
| Juliana Knust | Inesita |
| Lucas Babin | Nick |
| Camila Rodrigues | Mariana de Oliveira |
| Cacau Mello | Rose |
| Anderson Müller | Ariovaldo |
| Christiana Kalache | Maria Isabel "Bebela" |
| Franciely Freduzeski | Conchita |
| Rodrigo Hilbert | Murilinho |
| Viviane Victorette | Jú |
| Carolina Macieira | Penha |
| Duda Nagle | Radar Tupã do Nascimento |
| Luiza Valdetaro | Manuela "Manu" |
| Bruna Marquezine | Maria Flor |
| Mussunzinho | Farinha |
| Matheus Costa | Rick |
| Arlete Heringer | Rita |
| Flávia Guedes | Berenice |
| Marcelo Brou | Stallone |
| Lucy Mafra | Claudete |
| Dja Marthins | Dolores |
| Cláudia Borioni | Vilma |
| Maria Mariana Azevedo | Sol (child) |
| Brunno Abrahão | Tião (child) |
| Marly Bueno | Mrs. Mattos |

== Production ==
=== Casting Selection ===
Originally, Glória Perez wanted Cláudia Abreu as the protagonist Sol, repeating their collaboration from Barriga de Aluguel. The actress initially showed a lot of interest in playing Sol, but she set a condition: to film only three or four days a week. However, the director stated that this would not be possible, as it was a main role and the filming would be intense, requiring her constant presence. Since the condition was not accepted, Cláudia declined the role.

Next, Giovanna Antonelli was invited, but she also did not accept the offer, as she was pregnant with her first child and could not take on such an intensive role due to the pregnancy. Since none of the actresses considered the author’s main choices accepted the role, auditions for the role of Sol were opened.

Mariana Ximenes was the third actress invited, but since she did not want to play another “mocinha” immediately after Chocolate com Pimenta, she requested to be assigned a different role and was cast as the rebellious funk singer Raíssa. Danielle Winits, Regiane Alves, Deborah Secco, and Camila Morgado auditioned for the role, but the first two did not fit the profile.

The decision between Deborah and Camila caused tension between the author and director Jayme Monjardim, as Gloria wanted Deborah while he wanted Camila. Gloria argued that Camila had a naturally strong and determined profile, suitable to play a character who would suffer a lot, assigning her as the main antagonist, while the protagonist role went to Deborah.

Alinne Moraes was invited to play Lurdinha but chose instead to take the lead role in Como uma Onda. Singer Wanessa Camargo auditioned for the same role but was not selected. The part eventually went to Cleo, marking her debut in a telenovela at that time.

Bianca Rinaldi was invited to play Helô, but she opted to sign with Record to star in A Escrava Isaura, and was replaced by Simone Spoladore.

Preta Gil was initially confirmed in the cast as Raíssa's best friend, who would introduce her to the funk world. She even left a show she was hosting on Band mid-contract for the role. However, her character was cut and never appeared in the show.

American actor Lucas Babin was approved to play a Texan cowboy because he already spoke Portuguese.

== Reception ==
=== Ratings ===
| Timeslot | Episodes | Premiere | | Finale | | Rank | Season | Average viewership |
| Timeslot | Episodes | Date | Viewers (in points) | Date | Viewers (in points) | Rank | Season | Average viewership |
|---|---|---|---|---|---|---|---|---|
| Mondays—Saturdays; 9:00pm | 203 | 14 March 2005 | 56 | 4 November 2005 | 66 | #1 | 2005 | 49,4 |

== Music ==
Unlike most Brazilian soap operas, América featured different styles of music for each milieu. Vila Isabel had only traditional samba, other parts of Rio de Janeiro included Brazilian pop and funk, São Paulo was scored with Brazilian country music and Miami, with a mix of American pop and Latin music.

The songs used in América are:

- Disco 1

01. "Soy Loco por Ti América" - Ivete Sangalo

02. "Até Pensei" - Nana Caymmi

03. "A Volta" - Roberto Carlos

04. "Pra Rua Me Levar" - Ana Carolina

05. "Feitiço da Vila" - Martinho da Vila

06. "Nervos de Aço" - Leonardo

07. "Mágoa de Boiadeiro" - Lourenço & Lourival

08. "Os Amantes" - Daniel

09. "Girassóis Azuis II" - George Israel

10. "Vida de Viajante" - Lenine

11. "She's a Carioca (Ela é Carioca)" - Celso Fonseca

12. "Você" - Marina Elali

13. "Um Matuto em New York" - Roberto Trevisan

14. "Sinfonia dos Sonhos" - Marcus Viana

15. "Órfãos do Paraíso" - Milton Nascimento

16. "Eu Sei que Vou te Amar" - Caetano Veloso

- Disco 2

1. "Regresa a mi" - Il Divo

2. "Don't" - Shania Twain

3. "Home" - Michael Bublé

4. "Abrazame Así" - Tamara

5. "Amore e Música" - Russell Watson

6. "The Look of Love" - Diana Krall

7. "Summertime" - Michael Bolton

8. "A Horse with no Name" - America

9. "Redneck Woman" - Gretchen Wilson

10. "Pieces of Me" - Ashlee Simpson

11. "Por un Beso" - Gloria Estefan

12. "Cancion Mixteca" - Mariachi Vargas de Tecalitlan

13. "Besame Mucho" - Maysa

14. "Wind Shaking the Trees" - Darwing James Band

15. "Long Long Away" - Jesse Johnson

17. "Can't Get Over" - Kasino

18. "Breath" - O2

19. "Little Girl" - Lucas Babin

20. "Take Me Home, Country Roads" - Happening

== Controversy ==
=== Gay kiss deleted scene ===
While being cited as a pop culture phenomenon previously, the soap opera received greater exposure in the media after a long-running (2005) storyline between two gay characters included a scene in which they share a kiss. The scene was scheduled to be air in the final episode, which created much anticipation from the gay community in Brazil. However, Rede Globo, the soap opera's production company, elected not to run the scene, much to the surprise of the writers, fans and actors involved. The event led to a number of protests for equal rights, condemning Globo for their actions.

=== Criticism of the positive portrayal of rodeo ===
Brazilian animal rights organizations criticized the telenovela because rodeo was favorably exposed in the story. Several non-large-scale protests happened in several cities and activists tried to exhort a nationwide boycott campaign against the series. Coincidentally, the series faced a decline of its audience, though that was not attributed to a boycott eventually.
