= 2001 in Brazilian television =

This is a list of Brazilian television related events from 2001.

== Events ==
- 6 January - The children's television show Xuxa Park airs for the last time, before the fire.
- 11 January - A fire occurs in the recording studio of the children's television show Xuxa Park, located at the production center of Rede Globo, in Jacarepaguá, Rio de Janeiro. At the time, 26 people are injured.
- 11 September - The coverage of the terrorist attacks against the United States, reported by TV Globo, interrupts the children's programme Bambuluá.

== Debuts ==
=== 2000s ===
- 12 October - Sítio do Picapau Amarelo (2001–2007)

== Television shows ==
=== 1970s ===
- Turma da Mônica (1976–present)

=== 1990s ===
- Malhação (1995–2020)
- Cocoricó (1996–2013)
- Chiquititas (1997–2001)

=== 2000s ===
- Sítio do Picapau Amarelo (2001–2007)

== Networks and services ==
=== Launches ===
Network	Type	Launch date	Notes	Source
ZooMoo Kids	Cable television	17 January		
BandNews	Cable and satellite	19 March		
Cartoonito	Cable and satellite	2 July		

=== Conversions and rebrandings ===
Old network name	New network name	Type	Conversion Date	Notes	Source
History	Cable and satellite	1 July			

=== Closures ===
Network	Type	Closure date	Notes	Source
MuchMusic Brasil	Cable and satellite	December		

== Ending this year ==
- Chiquititas (1997–2001)

== See also ==
- 2001 in Brazil
- List of Brazilian films of 2001
