= Cléo Pires =

Brazilian actress and singer (born 1982)

Cleo
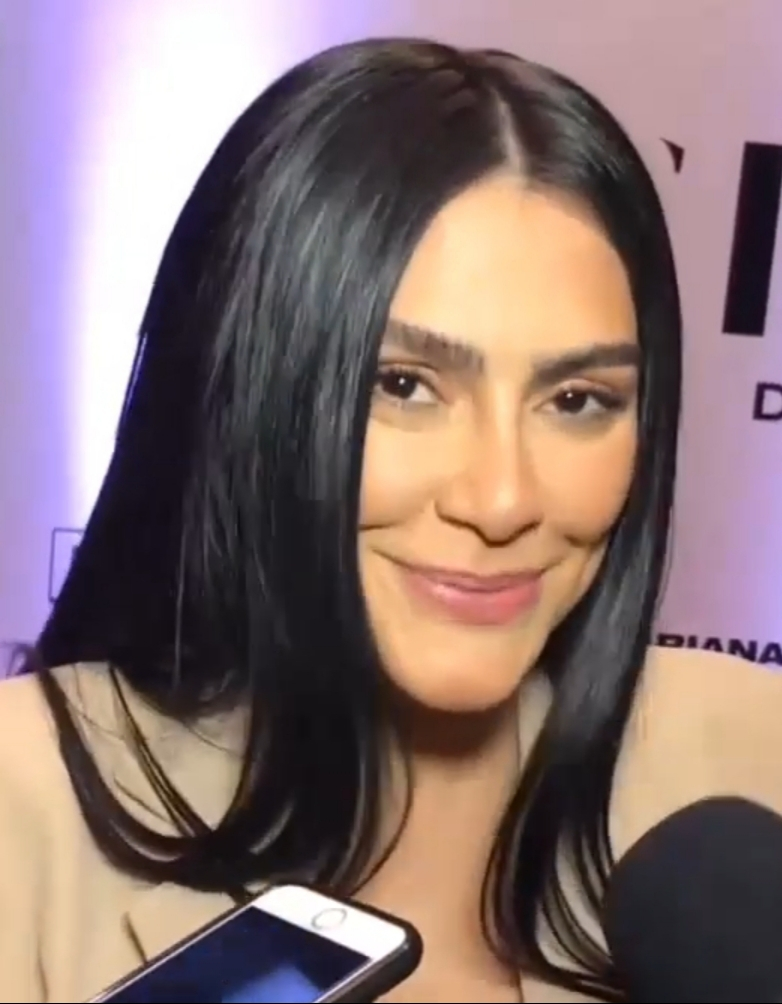
- Cleo in 2019
- Born: Cleo Pires Ayrosa Galvão; 2 October 1982 (age 43); Rio de Janeiro, Brazil
- Other name: Cleo Pires
- Occupations: Actress; singer
- Years active: 2003–present
- Spouses: João Vicente de Castro (m. 2010; div. 2012) Leandro D'Lucca (m. 2021)
- Parents: Fábio Júnior (father); Glória Pires (mother)
- Relatives: Fiuk (half-brother); Guilherme Boury (cousin)
- Website: cleopires.com.br

Cleo Pires Ayrosa Galvão (born 2 October 1982), known mononymously as Cleo, is a Brazilian actress and singer.

== Career ==
She made her debut as an actress when she participated in the Memorial de Maria Moura mini-series in 1994. It was a quick participation of just one episode in which the protagonist, Maria Moura, as a young woman, was replaced by her mother, Glória Pires, in the adulthood of the character. After that, she distanced herself from TV and the media, believing that she had no vocation to follow in her mother's footsteps. Cleo says she saw Gloria working day and night without stopping, the press invading her privacy and the phone ringing all the time, and that she did not want it for her future. She still says she just did not stand in the middle before, out of lack of will. Not that she had anything against her career, but it was something she did not think about, it was not in her head. A curious fact is that even the film being one of her passions, when asked if she wanted to be an actress, immediately thought of novels and theater, things that had no interest or curiosity.

Until, in 2003, she met Monique Gardenberg in a bathroom, and was invited to star in the movie Benjamin. Cleo says that she was surprised by such trust placed in her and therefore accepted the invitation. After much training and many rehearsals, since she had never made movies before, she filmed the film, whose script was based on the eponymous book by Chico Buarque. As soon as she finished the work and saw the result, she fell in love with the profession and decided that it was what she wanted. Even though she never took an acting course, she received praise for her performance and competed for several awards in the category of Best Actress, winning the Rio Festival.

In 2004, she was invited to star in the remake of the novel Cabocla, in the title role interpreted by her mother in the 1979 version. To avoid comparisons, and, believing that it would be too much responsibility to star in a novela and did not have enough preparation, the invitation, being replaced by the actress Vanessa Giácomo, who got the better after a battery of tests.

She shot to fame as one of the great revelations of the national drama, in interpreting the sexy Lurdinha novel América, Globo in 2005, becoming a sex symbol. That same year, she was named the sexiest woman in Brazil. According to Cleo, she only accepted the invitation to make the novela by knowing as much work as the author of its director, and, therefore, believe that it would be a good experience for her life. Also in 2005, Cleo attended the special program of the final year of the globe, in interpreting Cleopatra in the children's special, Clara e o Chuveiro do Tempo. She would also do a part in the special edition of the humorous Casseta & Planeta, Urgente! of end of year, however, due to health problems, was replaced by the singer Wanessa Camargo. In 2006, she played the rebel Letícia in Cobras & Lagartos.

For the paid channel Telecine Premium, hosted the Cineview, program that showed the news of the world of the cinema . After a reformulation, the attraction was called Moviebox, with a presentation by Daniel de Oliveira. In that same period, after almost two years of negotiations, she accepted to be cover of the magazine Nova, where she posed wearing only collars and a panties, lavishing style and sensuality.

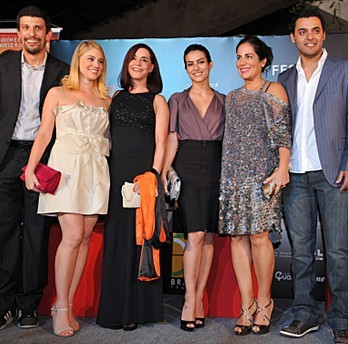
Cleo with the cast of the movie Lula, o Filho do Brasil

In 2008, she co-starred in the remake of Ciranda de Pedra, in which she lived the young teacher Margarida, a shy girl, who falls in love with the beautiful and honest engineer Eduardo. In 2009, she joined the cast of the soap opera Caminho das Índias, in which she played the Indian Surya, her first villain. Also in that year, after the resignation of the actress Juliana Paes in acting in the long one The Expendables, of Sylvester Stallone, Cleo was chosen to replace her. However, due to the novel by Glória Perez , her participation in the film could not be fulfilled. The role ended up with the actress Giselle Itié. Again, she was named one of the 25 sexiest women in the country, by Istoé Gente magazine .

Still in 2008, she recorded the film My Name Is Not Johnny and the following year recorded a film that tells the life story of Brazilian President Luiz Inácio Lula da Silva , Lula, the Son of Brazil , playing Lula's first wife, Maria Lurdes.

In August 2010 Cleo was the cover model for the Brazilian edition of Playboy magazine, in a special edition with 50 pages commemorating the 35 years of the magazine. In 2010/2011 she played India Estela, the protagonist of the telenovel Araguaia. The following year she starred in the episode " The Angel of Alagoas ", from the series As Brasileiras, directed by Daniel Filho. Cleo played Ana Terra in young stage of the film O Tempo e o Vento, a character who was his mother in miniseries of the same name in 1985.

Between 2012 and 2013, she played cosmopolitan Bianca in Salve Jorge. In 2014, back to TV, playing the fragile Katya, Alexander's wife (Alejandro Claveaux), who has an affair with the brother-André (Cauã Reymond) in O Caçador. In 2016, she participates in Haja Coração as Tamara, a romantic couple of Apollo Malvino Salvador. She can also be seen as Sabrina in Supermax, again working with Mariana Ximenes. In 2017, changes her stage name, adopting only Cleo. On September 1, 2017, Cléo participated in the new music video of the singer sertanejo Gusttavo Lima titled "Eu Vou Te Buscar" that in addition to bringing his participation, the rapper Hungary Hip Hop also participates in Pirenópolis, Goiás local of the recording of the video.

== Filmography ==
=== Film ===
Year	Project	Role	Notes
2003	Benjamim	Ariela Masé / Castana Beatriz	
2008	Meu Nome Não É Johnny	Sofia	
2009	Lula, Son of Brazil	Lourdes	
2011	Qualquer Gato Vira-Lata	Tatiana / Linda	
2013	Time and the Wind	Ana Terra	
2014	Rio, I Love You	Clara	segment "Inútil Paisagem"
2015	Qualquer Gato Vira-Lata 2	Tatiana / Linda	
2015	Operações Especiais	Francis	
2016	Stronger than the World	Viviane	
2019	Legalidade	Cecília Ruiz	
2021	Terapia do Medo	Clara / Fernanda	
2022	Me Tira da Mira	Roberta / Sandra	Also producer
2022	O Segundo Homem	Márcia	
2022	O Amor Dá Voltas	Dani	
2023	Eu Sou Maria	Professora Mari	
2025	Uma Babá Gloriosa	Gloria	
TBA	O Velho Fusca	Elaine	Also co-producer

=== Television ===
Year	Project	Role	Notes
1993	Mulheres de Areia	New York Girl	Episode: "6 March"
1994	Memorial de Maria Moura	Young Maria Moura	Episode: "17 May"
2005	América	Lurdinha	Won—Melhores do Ano for Best Female Revelation; Won—Meus Prêmios Nick for actress of the year.
2005	Clara e o Chuveiro do Tempo	Cleópatra	Episode: "25 December"
2006	Cobras & Lagartos	Letícia Pacheco	Won—Prêmio Contigo! do TV for Best Female Revelation; Won—Melhores de Ano awards for Best supporting actress Won—Meus Prêmio Nick for Actress of the year
2006	Páginas da Vida	Young Helena	Episode: "12 July"
2007	Cineview	Presenter	
2008	Episódio Especial	Herself	
2008	Ciranda de Pedra	Margarida Lemos Carmelo	
2009	Caminho das Indias	Surya Ananda	
2009	Episódio Especial	Herself	
2010–2011	Araguaia	Estela Rangel (Estrela Karuê)	Nominated—Prêmio, Extra de Televisâo for Best Lead Actress
2012	As Brasileiras	Ana	Episode: "O Anjo de Alagoas"
2012–2013	Salve Jorge	Bianca	
2014	O Caçador	Katia	
2014	A Mulher da Sua Vida	Pilar	Episode: "3 August
2016	Haja Coração	Tamara Bacellar	
2016	Supermax	Sabrina Toledo	
2018–2019	O Tempo Não Para	Betina Carvalhal	
2020	Show dos Famosos	Participant	Season 4
2023	A Magia de Aruna	Cloe	

== Discography ==
=== Extended Play (EP) ===
- 2018: Jungle Kid
- 2018: Melhor Que Eu
- 2023: Dark Pop

=== Singles ===
- Jungle Kid (2018)
- Bandida (2018)
- Trapped (2018)
- Melhor Que Eu (2018)
- Queima feat. Pocah (2019)
- Tormento feat. Karol Conká and Azzy (2021)
- Todo Mundo que Amei já me fez Chorar (2022)

=== As guest artist ===
- Você é do Mal - As Baías feat. Cleo (2020)
- Bom Ator - Number Teddie feat. Cleo (2022)

== Awards and nominations ==
Awards and nominations
Year	Awards	Category	Nominated work	Result	Ref.
2003	Festival do Rio	Best Actress	Benjamim	Won	
2005	Prêmio ACIE de Cinema	Best Actress	Benjamim	Nominated	
2005	Grande Prêmio do Cinema Brasileiro	Best Actress	Benjamim	Nominated	
2005	Melhores do Ano	Best Outstanding Actress	América	Won	
2005	Prêmio Extra de Televisão	Best Outstanding Actress	América	Won	
2005	Meus Prêmios Nick	Beautiful of the year	América	Won	
2006	Prêmio Contigo! de TV	Best Outstanding Actress	América	Won	
2006	Melhores do Ano	Best Supporting Actress	Cobras & Lagartos	Won	
2006	Meus Prêmios Nick	Beautiful of the year	Cobras & Lagartos	Won	
2007	9ª Prêmio Contigo! de TV	Best Supporting Actress	Cobras & Lagartos	Nominated	
2007	9ª Prêmio Contigo! de TV	Best Romantic Couple (with Carmo Dalla Vecchia)	Cobras & Lagartos	Nominated	
2008	Prêmio Qualidade Brasil	Best Actress	Meu Nome Não é Johnny	Nominated	
2008	Prêmio Contigo! de Cinema Nacional	Best Supporting Actress	Meu Nome Não é Johnny	Nominated	
2009	Prêmio Extra de Televisão	Best Supporting Actress	Caminho das Índias	Nominated	
2010	12ª Prêmio Contigo! de TV	Best Supporting Actress	Caminho das Índias	Nominated	
2011	Prêmio Extra de Televisão	Best Actress	Araguaia	Nominated	
2011	Prêmio Qualidade Brasil	Best Actress	Araguaia	Nominated	
2013	15ª Prêmio Contigo! de TV	Best Actress in a Series or Miniseries	As Brasileiras	Nominated	
2014	16ª Prêmio Contigo! de TV	Best Actress in a Series or Miniseries	O Caçador	Nominated	
2015	Troféu AIB de Imprensa	Actress	Operações Especiais	Won	

== Personal life ==
In 2023, Cleo said she is "kinda demisexual".

In addition to being the daughter of actor and singer Fabio Jr. and actress Gloria Pires, she is the granddaughter of actor and comedian Antônio Carlos Pires (father of Gloria Pires), half-sister of actor, singer and racing driver Fiuk (son of Fabio Jr. and businesswoman Cristina Kartalian) and first cousin of actor Guilherme Boury (son of soap opera author Margareth Boury and singer Heraldo Corrêa, younger brother of Fabio Jr.).
