= Ana Lima (actress) =

Brazilian actress and vocalist

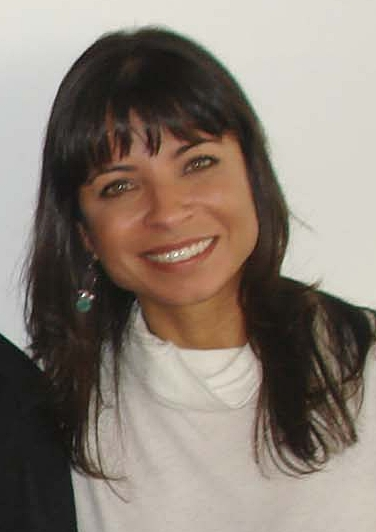
- Born: Ana Célia Lima; August 28, 1973 (age 51); Carangola, Brazil
- Occupation: Actress
- Spouse: Gabriel o Pensador (1999-2009)
- Children: 2

Ana Célia Lima (born August 28, 1973) is a Brazilian actress. She was married to musician Gabriel o Pensador, also being his backing vocals.

== Career ==
=== Television ===
Television
Year	Title	Role	Notes
2007	Carga Pesada	Eva	Episode: "Dupla Ação"
2007	Por Toda Minha Vida	Amália	Episode: "Leandro"
2007	Desejo Proibido	Eulália Palhares	
2008	Casos e Acasos	Raquel	Episode: "O Beijo, a Foto e o Empréstimo"
2008	Beleza Pura	Regina Paranhos	Cameo
2009	Caminho das Índias	Cecília Martins (Dr. Ciça)	
2010	Força-Tarefa	Solange	Episode: "Buraco"
2010	Araguaia	Lenita	
2012	Louco por Elas	Nurse	Cameo
2012	Malhação	Verônica	Cameo
2013	Louco por Elas	Tati Tattoo	Cameo
2013	Joia Rara	Zilda	
2016	Sol Nascente	Paula	

=== Cinema ===
Film
Year	Title	Role	Notes
2008	Bar A.K.A.	Serious woman	Short film
2011	Cilada.com		
