= Colégio Marista Arquidiocesano =

School in São Paulo, Brazil

Colégio Marista Arquidiocesano is a school located at Vila Mariana, a subcity of São Paulo, Brazil.

It was founded in 1858 and by 1908 the Maristas started teaching there.

Until 1935 it was located at Tiradentes Avenue, subcity of Luz. By January 25, it was opened at the new building, which had started in 1929.

In 1972 it opened to female students.

There is a language center, and an aquatic center complex in the new building finished by 2000.

== Notable alumni ==
- Venceslau Brás
- Jânio Quadros
- Mariana Ximenes
- Rodrigo Faro

== References and external links ==
- Archived website of Colégio Marista Arquidiocesano (in Portuguese)
- Província Marista Brasil Centro-Sul – PMBCS (in Portuguese)
- Location on Google Maps
