= Jeanne Chinn =

American actress and model

Jeanne Chinn is an American actress and model. She appeared in ER, Charmed, and According To Jim. She also co-starred in Code Name Phoenix along with Jeffrey Meek. She worked at various sub shops and shoe stores before becoming an actress and model. She is a rookie of Jeet Kune Do.

== Filmography ==
=== Television ===
- ER as Jennifer
- Charmed as Anling
- According To Jim as Jody Chen
- Curb Your Enthusiasm as Barbara Schneider in the "Car Salesman", episode 1 of season 2.

=== Movies ===
- Lethal Weapon 4 as Ping's mother
- Shopping for Fangs as Katherine Nguyen
- Target Audience 9.1 as Gillian
- R.S.V.P. as Cricket
