= Lucas Babin =

American actor

Tyler County Attorney
- In office January 1, 2019 – May 2026
- Preceded by: Lou Ann Cloy

Personal details
- Born: Lucas Edwin Babin; July 30, 1979 (age 47) Beaumont, Texas, U.S.
- Party: Republican
- Relations: Brian Babin (father)
- Education: Sam Houston State University (BA); University of Houston (JD)

Lucas Edwin Babin (born July 30, 1979) is an American attorney, actor, and fashion model who served as district attorney of Tyler County, Texas from 2019 to 2026. As an actor, Babin was noted for playing Spider in School of Rock (2003).

== Early life and education ==
Babin was born on July 30, 1979, in Beaumont, Texas. Babin is the son of Republican Congressman Brian Babin and the brother of former U.S. Navy SEAL officer and Extreme Ownership author, Leif Babin.

He earned a Bachelor of Arts degree from Sam Houston State University and a Juris Doctor from the University of Houston Law School.

== Acting and modeling career ==
He is known for playing Spider in the Paramount Pictures film, School of Rock, and has appeared in worldwide advertisements for Gucci, Versace, Versace Jeans Couture, CK, Calvin Klein, Roberto Cavalli, Just Cavalli, GAP, Louis Vuitton, and other top fashion brands.

Babin is the only American to star in a Brazilian telenovela, appearing in 67 episodes of the series América, on the Globo Network. He speaks Portuguese fluently. Babin was Paris Hilton's love interest in the music video "Stars Are Blind", as well as the knight in shining armor and boyfriend of Alanis Morissette in the 2002 music video for "Precious Illusions".

== Legal career ==
After several years in Houston, Babin moved back to his hometown Woodville, Texas. In 2018, Babin ran for and was elected as the district attorney of Tyler County, Texas.

As district attorney, Babin indicted Netflix for allegedly distributing lewd content through the release of Cuties (2020), which garnered controversy over its depiction of pre-adolescent girls. The U.S. Court of Appeals for the Fifth Circuit agreed with Netflix that Babin's prosecution was carried out in bad faith with the intent to harass Netflix, including presenting only selective portions of the film as evidence to the grand jury. According to Variety, commentators have suggested that the suit stands to boost Babin's political standing to prepare for a run for higher office.

== Filmography ==
=== Film ===
Year	Title	Role	Notes
2002	R.S.V.P.	Jimmy Franklin	
2003	School of Rock	Spider	
2005	Brick	Big Stoner	
2005	Venice Underground	Junkie	
2012	Slave	Sid	

=== Television ===
Year	Title	Role	Notes
1999	Undressed	Clyde	
2000	Angel	Joey	Episode: "First Impressions"
2000	This Is How the World Ends	Flash	Television film
2001	Sex and the City	Model at the Party	Episode: "The Real Me"
2002	ChromiumBlue.com	Joe	2 episodes
2005	América	Nick	67 episodes
2006	Avassaladoras: A Série	Peter / Stuart	3 episodes
2006	CSI: Miami	Todd	Episode: "If Looks Could Kill"
2006–2007	The Young and the Restless	Rocky	11 episodes
2007	CSI: Crime Scene Investigation	Larry Ludwig	Episodes: "The Case of the Cross-Dressing Carp"
