= Days of Nietzsche in Turin =

2001 film by Júlio Bressane

- Directed by: Júlio Bressane
- Written by: Júlio Bressane; Rosa Dias
- Starring: Fernando Eiras; Paulo José; Tina Novelli; Mariana Ximenes; Leandra Leal; Paschoal Villaboin; Isabel Themudo
- Distributed by: Grupo Novo de Cinema e TV; Riofilme
- Release dates: September 2001 (Venice); 25 January 2002 (Rotterdam); 31 March 2002 (Brazil)
- Running time: 85 minutes
- Country: Brazil
- Language: Portuguese

Days of Nietzsche in Turin (Portuguese: Dias de Nietzsche em Turim) is a 2001 biographical-drama Brazilian film directed by Júlio Bressane about the German philosopher Friedrich Nietzsche.

== Plot ==
A cinematographic essay, without dialogues, about the months Friedrich Nietzsche spent in Turin, Italy, with narration quoted by his original writings. It was there that the philosopher wrote some of his most known books such as Ecce Homo and Twilight of the Idols.

== Cast ==
- Fernando Eiras as Friedrich Nietzsche
- Paulo José
- Tina Novelli
- Mariana Ximenes
- Leandra Leal
- Paschoal Villaboin
- Isabel Themudo

== Awards and nominations ==
- Cinema Brazil Grand Prize, 2003 (Brazil) – Nominated in category of Best Picture
- Venice Film Festival, 2001 (Italy) – Winner of Filmcritica "Bastone Bianco" Award (Júlio Bressane).
- Candango Trophy, 2001 – Winner of Best Screenplay (Rosa Dias and Júlio Bressane)

== See also ==
- Brazilian films of 2001
