= Code Name Phoenix =

2000 television film

- Directed by: Jeff Freilich
- Starring: Jeanne Chinn; Jeffrey Meek; Jonathan Scarfe; Denis Akiyama; Christina Cox
- Original language: English

Production
- Running time: 97 minutes
- Production company: New World

Original release
- Network: UPN
- Release: March 3, 2000

Code Name Phoenix is a television film that aired on UPN on March 3, 2000. It was directed by Jeff Freilich. The film score was composed by Mark Snow.

== Plot ==
In 2020, where global peace has prevailed, a sinister new threat to world stability is exposed with a genetically engineered virus that can stop the human aging process. Faced with potential worldwide anarchy when the masses clamor for the drug, Special Agent Lucy Chang, code name Phoenix, must go undercover to track the drug's illegal marketer who has conspired with a beauty products magnate to auction the virus' rights to international bidders and ensure worldwide chaos. Chang is publicly denounced as a fugitive by a traitor in her organization and is immediately sought by Jake Hawkins, a U.S. Marshal. Convincing Jake that a planet-wide destabilization threat exists if the virus is made public, the duo joins forces and, with the combination of her remarkable martial arts prowess and his high-tech weaponry, battle to expose the plot and destroy the virus supply.

== Cast ==
- Jeanne Chinn as Agent Lucy Chang
- Jeffrey Meek as US Marshal Jake Hawkins
- Lexa Doig as Conchita Flores
- Denis Akiyama as Dr. Fong
- David Arnot as Sasha
- Alec McClure as Digital image of Sasha
- Jonathan Scarfe as Kenny Baker
