= Herbert Rudiger =

American terrorist

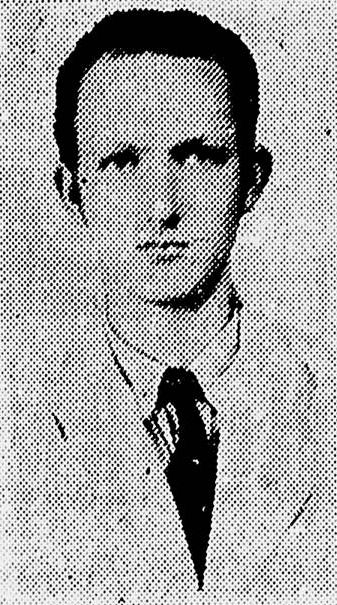
- Rudiger in or before 1952
- Born: 1927 or 1928; United States
- Occupation: Radio technician

Details
- Span of crimes: January – June 1952
- Country: Brazil
- State: Rio Grande do Sul
- Weapon: Bombs

Herbert Rudiger (born 1927 or 1928) is an American radio technician who terrorized the city of Porto Alegre, Brazil, in 1952 when he placed several bombs over the course of one month. Five people were known to have been wounded by his bombs; one of them disappeared after being injured by one of the bombs and presumably was not accounted for, as well as a bus ticket collector, although he was not in the newspapers' list of wounded victims but was mentioned in Rudiger's confession when he was captured.

== Bombings ==
Beginning in January 1952, bombs began to appear in the streets of Porto Alegre. One newspaper headline, titled "Bombas Misteriosas Explodindo Em Porto Alegre", was published on February 14, 1952.

The devices were left in crowded places or stuffed inside packages. One device exploded at the Viaduto Borges de Medeiros and injured a man described as "poor", who disappeared without requesting medical assistance.

== Investigation ==
Initially, the police attributed the bombings to Communists in the city, but ultimately they changed their version, attributing it to an unknown maniac, and in an attempt to calm the population, they advised them not to open any packages.

During this time, pranksters put false bombs in crowded streets, causing passersby to ask if it was a bomb, and while police came to check it, people laughed because the bombs contained mere paper and fruits' papers.

== Capture ==
In May 1952, Rudiger was fabricating a bomb in the workshop inside his house when it exploded, seriously wounding him and causing him to lose vision in one eye.

In the hospital the 24-year-old, who was the son of German parents, decided to confess to the police that he was the author of the bombings. He claimed his motive was the fun he obtained with the sensationalism of the media, with the following confession by Rudiger:

Neither do I know why I did it. Nobody knew anything. It all started when I made valves explode, the first in the Nacional Importadora and the second in the Importadora Americana. Then assumptions about me appeared in the newspaper. I then made a stronger one, which I put on Banco do Comercio's window. There was more sensationalism. I felt excited.

One night, I went to the cinema. Passing by, I placed a new bomb in the Viaduto Otavio Rocha. Returning from the cinema, I checked the place. It was still there, only exploding the next morning and injuring a bus ticket collector. Later, it was that one from Livraria Globo. I then stopped.

I was employed and only made bombs for leisure time, attempting to modify life's normality. One day, I was listening to the radio when the announcer, referring to the university freshman's parade, said that there was a note with the joke "Mister Bomba" (Mr. Bomb). Then returned the wish to make another petard. This was what I was doing lately and what brought me to the hospital.

Rudiger told police he suffered from psychosis and that he looked for a psychiatrist surnamed Kern but did not find a cure. According to him, he was tormented by his imagination and decided to create the bombs.

== Victims ==
List of the victims (none were fatally injured):

- Nelson Edmundo Lorenz
- Wilmar Almeida
- Nédio Martins da Silva
- Darci Xavider de Souza
- Aristeu Pedro da Costa
- An unidentified man, described as "poor"; left with no medical assistance after being injured by one of the devices
- An unidentified bus ticket collector; when captured, Rudiger claimed in his confession that a bomb he left at Viaduto Otavio Rocha injured one bus ticket collector

== Aftermath ==
In July 1952, Rudiger appeared in court and confessed to the bombings, and an inquiry was made.
