= Mariana Ximenes =

Brazilian actress (born 1981)

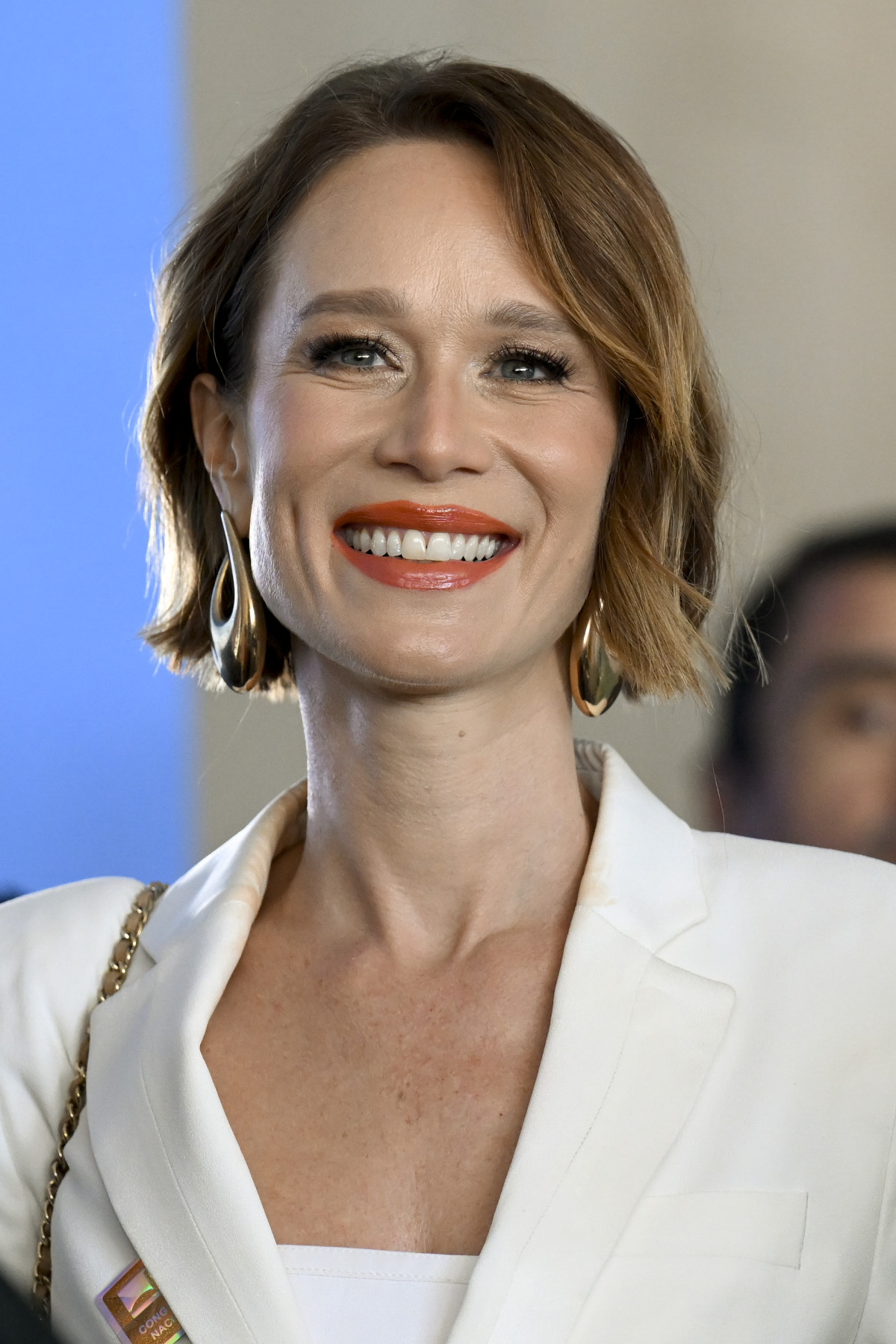
- Ximenes at the Brazilian National Congress in 2025
- Born: Mariana Ximenes do Prado Nuzzi; 26 April 1981 (age 45); São Paulo, Brazil
- Occupation: Actress
- Years active: 1998–present
- Spouse: Pedro Buarque de Hollanda (m. 2001; div. 2009)

Signature
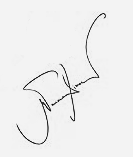

Mariana Ximenes do Prado Nuzzi (Brazilian Portuguese: [maɾiˈɐnɐ ʃiˈmɛnis]; born 26 April 1981) is a Brazilian actress. Her first role was in the telenovela Fascinação in 1998 where she portrayed the role of Emília Gouveia. In the same year she played the role of Ruth Stern in the film Caminho dos Sonhos. In 2000, she played in Uga-Uga portraying "Bionda". This role rise to prominence as she became widely known in Brazil and internationally. Later in 2001, she offered her services in the Portuguese voice over translation in the Canadian/Chinese animated series Braceface, for the character Sharon Spitz. She later played the protagonist in Cobras & Lagartos in 2006 and Lara in A Favorita, later in 2008. In 2010, she portrayed her first villainous role in the critically acclaimed telenovela Passione. Since 2010 she has appeared in several telenovelas, television series, films and theatre performances.

Mariana Ximenes has also earned several accolades throughout her acting career such as: Melhores do Ano, Grande Otelo, Troféu Impresa, Festival de Gramado, Festival do Recife, Prêmio Contigo among others.

== Early life ==
Mariana Ximenes do Prado Nuzzi was born in São Paulo on 26 April 1981 and grew up in Vila Mariana, a neighborhood in São Paulo. She is the daughter of speech therapist Fátima Ximenes do Prado, of Dutch descent, and lawyer José Nuzzi Neto, who is of Italian descent from Apulia.

Mariana dreamed to be an actress since her childhood. At age 6, she appeared in a school play as Cinderella. She began acting in amateur theater, insisting to her parents invest in her career as an actress, even participating in various advertising campaigns. Her first acting lessons were in Teatro Escola Célia Helena, and at age 12, she had already appeared in more than 200 commercials. She attended Colégio Marista Arquidiocesano, where she studied from 3rd grade till her 3rd year of high school.

== Career ==
=== 1994–01: Fascinação, Uga-Uga and A Padroeira ===
When she was seventeen, in 1998, Mariana debuted on television in the telenovela Fascinação of SBT in 1998, where she played the character Emília, her first major television role. In the same year, she joined Rede Globo and began working in her (Rede Globo) productions. She appeared in the episode "Dupla Traição" in the series Você Decide and in the film Caminho dos Sonhos portraying the character Ruth Stern. She also participated in the pilot of the series Sandy & Junior portraying the character Vicky.

In 1999, she played Celi Montana in Andando nas Nuvens. She also made a cameo appearance in the telenovela Força de um Desejo playing Ângela, in 2000.

Mariana played the character Bionda, which yielded great success for her career.

In 2001, she appeared in Brava Gente in the episode, "A Sonata", playing the character Luciana. She first performed in the Portuguese voice over translation for the character Sharon Spitz in the Canadian/Chinese animated series Braceface. She later did some ads for Fox Kids Brazil and she also played Izabel de Avelar in A Padroeira. That same year, she also starred in her second film, Dias de Nietzsche em Turim, playing Júlia Fino.

=== 2002–06: A Casa das Sete Mulheres, Chocolate com Pimenta and Cobras & Lagartos ===
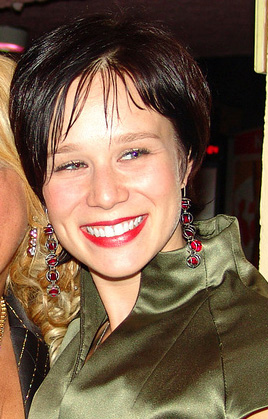
Ximenes in 2005

In 2002, Mariana Ximenes made a guest appearance in the comedy series Os Normais, in "A Turma do Didi" as Glorinha and Brava Gente in episode "Arioswaldo e o Lobisomem" as Branca Luz, alongside Suzana Vieira and Ângelo Antônio. Earlier that year, she had starred in her third film O Invasor, which earned her the award for Best Supporting Actress at the Festival do Recife, Passista Trophy, Grande Prêmio BR do Cinema Brasileiro and Cinema Brazil Grand Prize.

The following year, she played the character Rosário in A Casa das Sete Mulheres. She won the award for Best romantic couple along with Thiago Fragoso earning her a Contigo Award for her character that became popular among viewers, although her character died at the end of the miniseries. During this period, Mariana made a special participation in the program Zorra Total and A Grande Família. Her next role was in a telenovela perhaps one of her most prominent in her entire career. She played Ana, the main protagonist, also known as Aninha, in Chocolate com Pimenta that earned her media attention due to its success thanks to her portrayal in the telenovela. Mariana also starred in films such as O Homem do Ano and Uma Estrela Pra Ioiô (2003). In 2004, she also participated in the special Histórias de Cama & Mesa.

In 2005, she was cast the critically acclaimed telenovela América as the rebellious Raíssa. Her role, was well received by critics: Sérgio Ripardo said that, "América would be remembered in the future because of Mariana Ximenes and Cléo Pires, due to the popularity of their characters" and Folha Online said, "The character Raíssa overshadowed the main character in the plot, Sol", played by Deborah Secco. This year, she also starred in one more film Gaijin - Ama-me Como Sou portraying Weronika Muller. She participated in her second Portuguese voice over translation in the movie Chicken Little, where he voiced the character Hebe Marreca, known as Pata Ugly. Also in 2005, she made a cameo in Casseta & Planeta playing the character Raíssa. In 2006, Mariana was cast as Lílian Gonçalves in the miniseries JK. In Cobras & Lagartos, she portrayed the character Bel, that was initially for Giovanna Antonelli. In the plot, her character is a violinist who inherits 49% of her deceased uncle, Omar (Francisco Cuoco), who owns a fictitious company called Luxus.

=== 2007–10: A Favorita and Passione ===
After Cobras & Lagartos, she made a cameo appearance in Paraíso Tropical as Sônia, a journalist who becomes the new girlfriend of the character Mateus, played by Gustavo Leão. Originally, Gilberto Braga had cast her to play the character Bebel, but she later turned down the offer thus Camila Pitanga taking over the role. The following year, Mariana played the heroine, Lara Fontini, in A Favorita, one of the main characters of the plot. The look of her character became a hit among Brazilians. She was invited to be the presenter of the program Superbonita channel GNT, where she spoke about pin-ups. She also made a cameo as herself in the documentary Episódio Especial and as herself in the documentary Despertar das Amazonas.

In 2010, Mariana Ximenes was cast to play Clara Medeiros in the telenovela Passione, her first villain role in her acting career. It is based on Bette Davis' characters. In order to compose the character as well as some other villains in Brazilian telenovelas, such as Nazaré of Renata Sorrah and Maria de Fátima of Glória Pires, some changes were also made on her visual appearance to liven the character, making her hair longer and dressing in bolder outfits.

The Clara in, Passione, struck me very much. Besides being a very complex character, who sometimes portrays villainess girl in me she demanded a lot, it was the first time that I collaborated with Tony Ramos, Fernanda Montenegro, Cleyde Yáconis, and Leonardo Villar. The character gave me a lot in many ways.

— Mariana Ximenes about her character in Passione.

The actress Mariana Ximenes topped the poll site in Caras magazine as the greatest villain in telenovela history. The critical Flávio Ricco said "Mariana Ximenes as Clara did one of her best work in television". She won in Troféu Imprensa Awards for Best Alctress for her portrayal of the character, and was also nominated in some other awards. The journalist Fabíola Reipert said, "Mariana Ximenes can show her talent, because she is in the main cast of the telenovela, even with only 29 years". The character Clara was also compared to Bia Falcão, Fernanda Montenegro's character in Belíssima.

Furthermore, Mariana returned to theater, starring in the play Os Altruístas, directed by Guilherme Weber, after nine years of not performing on stage.

=== 2011–present: As Brasileiras, Guerra dos Sexos and movies ===
In 2011, Due to the success of her character in Passione, Rede Globo decided to keep her away from the small screen for some time. She produced the film Um Homem Só by herself in addition to starring in the film. In May 2012, she was part of the cast of the series As Brasileiras in the episode "A Adormecida de Foz do Iguaçu", playing the seductive character Liliane. She made her comeback in the Portuguese voice over translation for 31 minutos, la película, for the voice of Cachirula's character. She was also confirmed to star in the Guerra dos Sexos as Juliana. Shortly afterwards she was part of the film Os Penetras with Eduardo Sterblitch and Marcelo Adnet. She also starred in the film O Gorila by the filmmaker José Eduardo Belmonte, as a seductive character.

In 2013, she starred in the movies O Uivo da Gaita and O Rio nos Pertence! by Ricardo Pretti. Mariana performed a vedette cabaret in Joia Rara. In 2016, she starred the successor of Totalmente Demais, Haja Coração, together with Malvino Salvador.

== Personal life ==
=== Relationships ===
Mariana Ximenes and Pedro Buarque de Hollanda met at a party in 2001. They soon began cohabitating and considered themselves a "married couple." In 2008, Mariana starred in a film produced by him, A Mulher do Meu Amigo.

In 2009, confirmed her separation from Pedro. She stated that, "We parted cordially and maintain a friendship: alone and quiet".

== Filmography ==
=== Television ===
Year	Title	Role	Notes
1998	Você Decide	Valéria	Episode: "Dupla Traição"
1998	Fascinação	Emília Gouveia	
1998	Sandy & Junior	Vicky	Special End of Year
1999	Malhação	Herself	Special participation
1999	Andando nas Nuvens	Celi Montana	
2000	Força de um Desejo	Ângela	Special participation
2000	Uga-Uga	Bionda Cristina Arruda Prado	
2001	Brava Gente	Luciana	Episode: "A Sonata"
2001	Braceface	Sharon Spitz	Brazilian voice dubbing
2001	A Padroeira	Izabel de Avelar	
2002	Os Normais	Sônia	Episode: "Acima do Normal"
2002	A Turma do Didi	Glorinha	Participation
2002	Brava Gente	Brancaluz	Episode: "Arioswaldo e o Lobisomem"
2003	A Casa das Sete Mulheres	Rosário Gonçalves da Silva Ferreira	
2003	A Grande Família	Ana/Nicole	Episode: "Essa é pra Casar!"
2003	Cartão de Visitas	Reporter	Participation
2003	Chocolate com Pimenta	Ana Francisca Mariano da Silva (Aninha)	
2004	Histórias de Cama & Mesa	Carolina	Special End of Year
2005	América	Raíssa Pamplona Lopes Prado	
2005	Casseta & Planeta, Urgente!	Raíssa	Participation
2006	JK	Lílian Gonçalves Lima	
2006	Cobras & Lagartos	Maria Isabel Gonçalves Pasquim (Bel)	
2007	Paraíso Tropical	Sonia Silva Weissman	Special participation
2008	A Favorita	Lara Pereira Fontini	
2009	Superbonita	Presenter	
2009	Despertar das Amazonas	Herself	Documentary
2010	Passione	Clara Miranda Medeiros	
2012	As Brasileiras	Liliane	Episode: "A Adormecida de Foz do Iguaçu"
2012	Guerra dos Sexos	Juliana de Alcântara Pereira Barreto	
2013	Joia Rara	Aurora Lincoln	
2014	A Mulher da Sua Vida	Woman	
2014	A Grande Família	Lola Ferrara	Episode: "Um Hóspede do Barulho
2014	Eu Que Amo Tanto	Leididai de Oliveira Fontes	Episode: Leididai
2016	Haja Coração	Constância Rigoni Di Marino (Tancinha)	
2016	Supermax	Bruna Sabino	
2017	Cidade Proibida	Suzana	Episode: "Caso Suzana"
2018	Se Eu Fechar os Olhos Agora	Adalgisa Bastos	
2019	Ilha de Ferro	Drª. Olívia Dias	Season 2
2021	Nos Tempos do Imperador	Luísa Margarida de Barros Portugal, Countess of Barral	
2021	The Masked Singer Brasil	Guest judge	Special participation
2022	Happy Hour com Mariana Ximenes	Presenter	
2022	Turma da Mônica - A Série	Madame Frufru	
2023	O Repórter do Poder	Herself	Docuseries
2023	Amor Perfeito	Gilda Torquato Rubião	
2023	Vai na Fé	Herself	Special participation
2024	Tributo	Herself	Episode: "Ary Fontoura"
2024	Mania de Você	Ísis dos Santos Cavalcanti	
2025	Tributo	Herself	Episode: "Walcyr Carrasco"
2025	Show 60 Anos	Ana Francisca	Especial 60 anos TV Globo
2025	Dona de Mim	Mirna Vargas	Special participation
2026	Quem Ama Cuida	Eudora (Dora)	

=== Films ===
Year	Title	Role	Notes
1998	Caminho dos Sonhos	Ruth Stern	
2001	Dias de Nietzsche em Turim	Eva Chamberlain	
2002	O Invasor	Marina	
2003	O Homem do Ano	Gabriela	
2003	Uma Estrela Pra Ioiô	Ioiô	Short film
2005	Gaijin - Ama-me Como Sou	Weronika Muller	
2005	Chicken Little	Hebe Marreca	Brazilian voice dubbing
2006	A Máquina	Karina	
2006	Muita Alegria e 40 Graus de Calor		Short film
2006	Muito Gelo e Dois Dedos D'Água	Roberta	
2008	A Mulher do Meu Amigo	Renata	
2009	Bela Noite Para Voar	Princess	
2009	Hotel Atlântico	Diana	
2010	Quincas Berro D'Água	Vanda Cunha	
2012	Os Penetras	Laura	
2012	31 minutos, la película	Cachirula	Brazilian voice dubbing
2012	O Gorila	Cintia	
2013	Harmonica's Howl	Antônia	
2013	Rio Belongs to Us		
2014	O Fim de Uma Era		
2014	Para Sempre Teu, Caio F.	Herself	
2015	Quase Memória	Maria	
2016	Um Homem Só	Josie	
2016	Prova de Coragem	Adri	
2016	Zoom	Michelle	
2016	Uma Loucura de Mulher	Lúcia	
2016	Sing	Rosita	Brazilian voice dubbing
2017	Os Penetras 2 – Quem Dá Mais?	Laura	
2017	D.P.A - O Filme	Bibi da Capa Preta	
2017	Gosto Se Discute	Herself	
2017	Oitavo - Filme	A Sonhadora	Short film
2018	Todos os Paulos do Mundo	Herself	Documentary
2018	O Grande Circo Místico	Margarete	
2021	L.O.C.A.	Manuela	
2021	Capitu e o Capítulo	Capitu	
2023	Amores Pandêmicos	Bia	

== Theater ==
Year	Title	Role
1999	Auto de Natal	Maria
2000	A Rosa Tatuada	Rosa
2000	Paixão de Cristo	Maria
2000	Os Lusíadas	Maria
2005	O que diz Molero?	Investigadora
2006	Justine Recompensada	Justine
2011	Os Altruístas	Sydney
2020	Cara Palavra	Several characters

== Advertising ==
=== Risqué ===
In 2008, Mariana Ximenes was invited to be the poster girl for Risqué business on the company's various glazes. Later that year, Risqué created a line of nail polishes called Rendas do Brasil, named after the traditional enamel leading the company's sales, Renda. The Risqué is the leader in selling nail polish, and the first to run commercials on TV about nail polishes. In 2009, she starred in Campaign Os 7 Vermelhos Capitais, with seven different shades of red, a special edition. In 2009, she was part of the campaign Risqué Jóias Místicas, with various shades, ranging from light to dark blue. According to the actress, the idea was genius, because she always combines her jewelry with the color of her nail polish. In 2011, she starred in the campaign Pop 4 You, a line of nail polishes inspired by the 60's, with colorful hues and typical summer colors. The line was launched in November, more glazes were used by Mariana in her character Clara in the propagated telenovela Passione. In 2012, she starred in the campaign Clássicos Risqué with shades of pink and her Frenchie, which was used in commercials and became a success.

=== Products and trade ===
In 2000, investing in the success of the soap opera Uga-Uga, Rede Globo signed a contract with Estrela for manufacturing a Susi Bionda doll, inspired by the character of Mariana Ximenes. With Marisol Ribeiro, she starred in commercials for Johnson & Johnson. She was also the poster girl for Havaianas, along with actor Rodrigo Lombardi, including recording commercials for the brand. With Positivo Informática, she starred in campaigns for several years. She was also the poster girl for cards by Banco Bradesco. At Avon, she made the cover of the magazine along with Giselle Itié and Sheron Menezzes, also starring in commercials. She was also the poster girl for the Always absorbent line. She became the new poster girl Sunsilk in 2011, starring in the commercial Silk Pro-Natural. She was also the star of the summer campaign Arezzo. She recently starred in a campaign with actor Reynaldo Gianecchini for the brand Cavalera. With only 12 years of being active, Mariana has starred in over 200 commercials.

== Awards and nominations ==
Year	Award	Category	Nominated work	Result
1999	Prêmio Jornal dos Clubes	Best Female Revelation	Celi in Andando nas Nuvens	Won
1999	Magnífico Award	Best Female Revelation	Celi in Andando nas Nuvens	Won
1999	Prêmio Qualidade Brasil	Biggest Revelation	Celi in Andando nas Nuvens	Won
2000	Prêmio Millenium	Best Actress	Bionda in Uga Uga	Won
2000	Melhores do Ano	Best Female Revelation	Bionda in Uga Uga	Won
2000	Prêmio Qualidade Brasil	Best Actress	Bionda in Uga Uga	Won
2000	Meus Prêmios Nick	Best Actress	Bionda in Uga Uga	Won
2000	Prêmio Magnífico	Highlight of the year	Bionda in Uga Uga	Won
2002	Festival do Recife	Best Supporting Actress	Marina in O Invasor	Won
2002	Passista Trophy	Best Supporting Actress	Marina in O Invasor	Won
2002	Prêmio Qualidade Brasil	Best Supporting Actress	Marina in O Invasor	Won
2003	8º Prêmio Guarani	Best Supporting Actress	Marina in O Invasor	Nominated
2003	Grande Prêmio BR do Cinema Brasileiro	Best Supporting Actress	Marina in O Invasor	Won
2003	Prêmio Contigo	Best Romantic Couple with Thiago Fragoso	Rosário in A Casa das Sete Mulheres	Won
2003	Melhores do UOL e PopTevê	Best Actress	Aninha in Chocolate com Pimenta	Won
2005	FestCineGoiânia	Best Actress	Karina in A Máquina	Won
2005	Capricho Awards	Best Actress	Raíssa in América	Won
2006	Meus Prêmios Nick	Favorite Actress	Bel in Cobras & Lagartos	Won
2006	Capricho Awards	Best Actress Nationally	Bel in Cobras & Lagartos	Won
2006	12th Prêmio Guarani	Best Actress	Karina in A Máquina	Nominated
2007	Prêmio Contigo! do Cinema Nacional	Best Supporting Actress	Karina in A Máquina	Won
2009	Melhores do Ano	Best Actress	Lara Fontini in A Favorita	Nominated
2009	Troféu Imprensa	Best Actress	Lara Fontini in A Favorita	Nominated
2009	15º Prêmio Guarani	Best Actress	Diana in Hotel Atlântico	Nominated
2010	4th Prêmio Quem	Best Actress	Vanda in Quincas Berro D'Água	Won
2010	Prêmio Contigo! do Cinema Nacional	Best Supporting Actress	Diana in Hotel Atlântico	Nominated
2010	Veja Cariocas do Ano	Best Actress	Clara Medeiros in Passione	Won
2010	Prêmio Minha Novela	Best Actress	Clara Medeiros in Passione	Won
2011	Troféu Imprensa	Best Actress	Clara Medeiros in Passione	Won
2011	Troféu Internet	Best Actress	Clara Medeiros in Passione	Won
2011	Melhores do Ano	Best Actress	Clara Medeiros in Passione	Nominated
2011	Prêmio Jovem Brasileiro	Best Theatre Actress	Sydney in Os Altruístas	Won
2013	Prêmio Contigo! de TV de 2013	Best Actress in a Telenovela	Juliana in Guerra dos Sexos	Nominated
2015	Festival de Gramado	Best Actress	Josie in Um Homem Só	Won
2017	Troféu Internet	Best Actress in a Telenovela	Tancinha in Haja Coração	Nominated
2017	Prêmio Quem de Televisão	Best Television Actress	Tancinha in Haja Coração	Nominated
2018	Platino Awards	Best Actress in a Series	Bruna in Supermax	Nominated
2020	Séries em Cena Awards	Best Actress Nationally	Olívia in Ilha de Ferro	Nominated
2021	Melhores do Ano - RD1	Best Actress	Luísa in Nos Tempos do Imperador	Won
2021	Prêmio F5	Best Actress in a Telenovela	Luísa in Nos Tempos do Imperador	Nominated
2021	Prêmio Contigo	Best Actress in a Telenovela	Luísa in Nos Tempos do Imperador	Nominated
2021	Prêmio APCA de Televisão	Best Actress	Luísa in Nos Tempos do Imperador	Nominated
2022	VHS Film Society Awards	Best Actress	Capitu in Capitu e o Capítulo	Nominated
2022	Troféu Imprensa	Best Actress	Luísa in Nos Tempos do Imperador	Nominated
2022	Troféu Internet	Best Actress	Luísa in Nos Tempos do Imperador	Nominated
2023	Venice TV Awards	Branded Entertainment	Happy Hour with Mariana Ximenes	Won
2023	Troféu AIB de Imprensa	Best Actress	Gilda in Amor Perfeito	Nominated
2023	Prêmio Noticiasdetv.com	Best Antagonist Actress or Villain	Gilda in Amor Perfeito	Won
2023	Melhores do Ano NaTelinha	Best Actress	Gilda in Amor Perfeito	Won
2023	Prêmio ArteBlitz de Novela	Best Villain Actress	Gilda in Amor Perfeito	Won
2023	Prêmio Área VIP	Best Actress	Gilda in Amor Perfeito	Won
2023	Melhores do Ano - Duh Secco	Actress	Gilda in Amor Perfeito	Won
