= Murder of Lucas Terra =

2001 killing of a teenager in Salvador, Brazil

Lucas Terra Case
- Location: Avenida Vasco da Gama
- Date: March 21, 2001
- Attack type: Rape and murder
- Deaths: 1
- Victim: Lucas Vargas Terra
- Defenders: Vilebaldo José de Freitas Pereira (2008); Delma Lobo (2011); Vera Lucia Medauar (2011); Patricia Sobral (2012); Gelza Almeida (2013)
- Accused: Silvio Roberto Galiza (Shepherd); Igreja Universal; Joel Miranda Macedo; Fernando Aparecido da Silva
- Judge: Fórum Ruy Barbosa

The Lucas Terra case refers to the rape and murder of 14-year-old Lucas Vargas Terra. The crime took place on March 21, 2001, in Salvador, within the Brazilian state of Bahia, and was committed by two pastors of the Universal Church of the Kingdom of God (UCKG).

The case gained national and international repercussions. His photo first appeared in the newspaper Correio in May 2001. It was shown on Rede Globo's Linha Direta on November 30, 2006. It was listed in 2019 by Correio as one of the crimes that "marked the last 40 years in Bahia".

Lucas Terra suffered sexual assaults and was burned alive. Suspects are Pastor Silvio Roberto Galiza, a bishop, a worker, and a security guard at the Universal headquarters in Salvador. UCKG pastor Galiza was convicted in 2004, sentenced to 18 years imprisonment, and released after seven years. The UCKG was convicted of moral damages and paid two million reais to Lucas Terra's family.

The popular jury hearing of the case was postponed in March 2020, due to the COVID-19 pandemic. In 2021, a public petition was opened asking the Judiciary of the State of Bahia to set the date of the Jury Court; it was set for April 25, 2023, at the Ruy Barbosa Forum, in Salvador. UCKG pastors Fernando Aparecido da Silva and Joel Miranda were sentenced to 21 years in prison.

== History ==
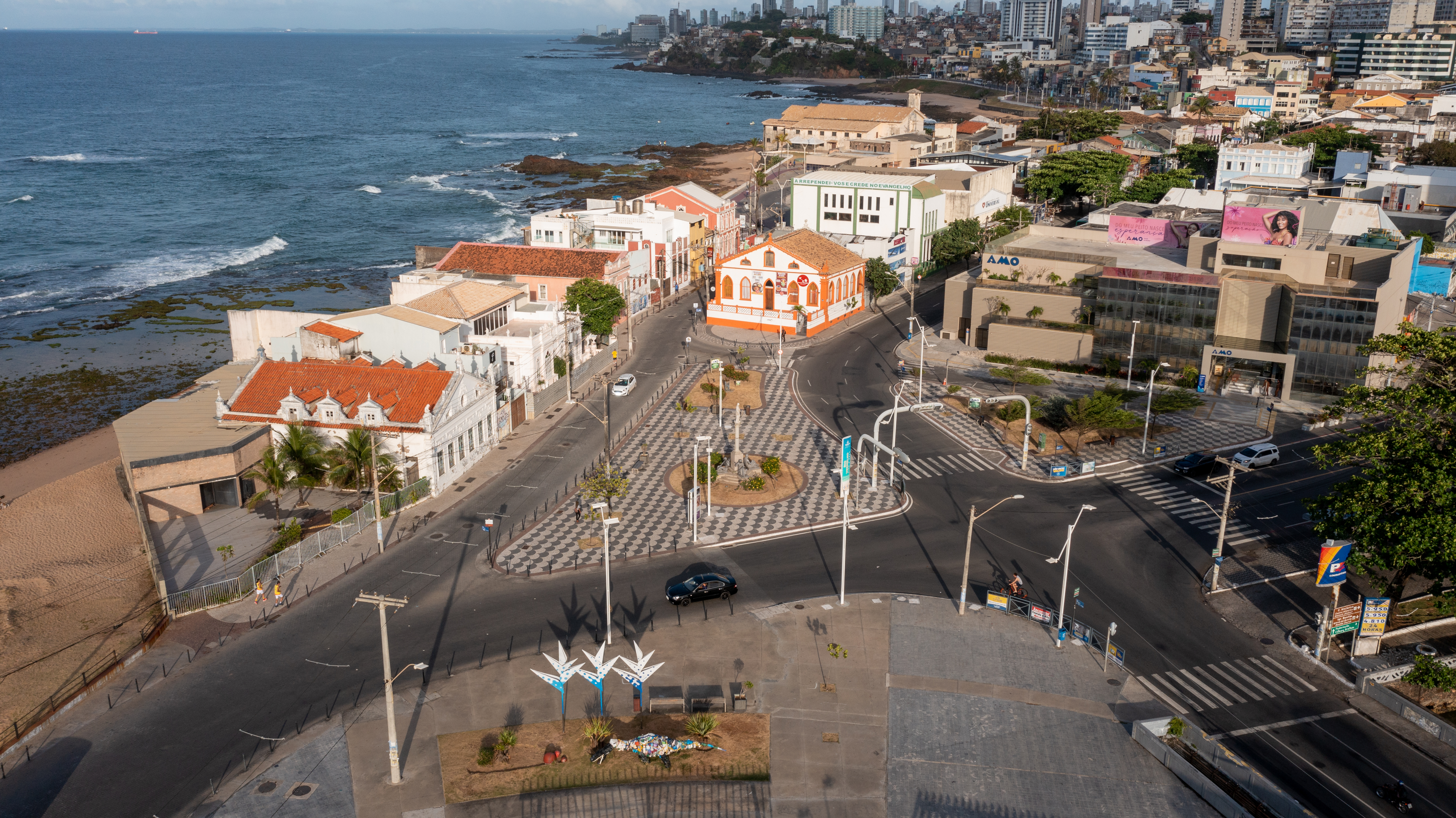
Salvador's Rio Vermelho neighborhood. The Universal Church of God church where the incident occurred is pictured in the middle of the photograph, just beyond the intersection.

=== Disappearance ===
On the night Terra disappeared, on March 21, 2001, the boy called his father, Carlos Terra, from a public telephone, informing him that he was with Pastor Silvio Roberto Galiza and due to the time he was going to sleep at the Universal Church of the Kingdom of God, in the neighborhood of Rio Vermelho. During the searches, Pastor Galiza told contradictory versions about the last time he saw Lucas. According to the prosecutor in the case, Davi Gallo, the pastor was close to the phone Lucas called and the searches were "blurred" by false information.

=== Body ===
On March 23, 2001, a body was found inside a burned crate in a vacant lot on Avenida Vasco da Gama. The body was put on hold for forty-three days at the Instituto Médico Legal, awaiting a DNA test. It was pointed out that the body would be that of Lucas Terra due to a lock of hair and parts of the clothes that were left intact, which days later was confirmed by the police expert report. The medical report revealed that there was an attempt to asphyxiate him and that afterwards he was charred to such an extent that it was impossible to determine the cause of death and whether there was sexual abuse or not; this detail led the prosecutor to believe that "there was certainly an act of sexual violence".

Criminal experts found remains of tissue similar to that found in the Rio Vermelho church on the body, linking the crime to Galicia and Universal. Lucas was buried in Bosque da Paz Cemetery. The crime took place days before Lucas and his father would immigrate to Italy, where his mother, Marion Terra, was already living.

=== Witnesses ===
According to witnesses, the boy was a very participatory member within the church and Galiza became obsessed with Lucas in a short time, demonstrating a domineering attitude towards him. The pastor was bothered when Lucas was close to the girls and always invited him to sleep in the church with other boys, which was unknown to Carlos Terra.

The pastor's superiors transferred Galiza to another institution after discovering that he slept in the same bed with Lucas in church, while the other boys slept in a separate room. However, after the transfer, Galiza continued to visit the Universal that Lucas attended. The pastor had already been expelled from another religious community, which earned him the nickname "The Secretary of the Devil" by residents of the neighborhood.

Witnesses who testified against Galiza were threatened by other church members. The witness who was Lucas's girlfriend, A.P.R.M., 17, said she was harassed, humiliated and expelled. The same was reported by the witness M.O.C.

"I was threatened and even going to church for 20 years, they said I was supposed to shut up. The regime is military. They say that [people] have to say everything in the name of the Lord, even lying. That's because I heard the pastor Silvio contradicting himself as to where he said he had left Lucas."

The reporting team of the newspaper A Tarde was also threatened and persecuted by order of Bishop João Leite, who called his security guards, preventing other members of the church from being interviewed by journalists. Carlos Terra was also threatened, which led him to ask the Public Ministry for help. Publicist and friend of Carlos Terra, Toni Costa, was enrolled in the witness protection program in 2003.

When giving his statement, in July 2002, Pastor Fernando was detained under the judge's observation, after contradicting himself several times.

=== Protests ===
In October 2001, the investigation was completed and Silvio Galiza was accused of Lucas' death, but his arrest was not decreed, which only happened after Carlos Terra camped outside the public prosecutor's office in Salvador.

Lucas's parents turned to Human Rights NGOs and the Ministry of Justice. Carlos Terra went to deliver a letter to the United Nations in Switzerland, where he questioned the delay in the trial and where the financial resources of Silvio Galiza came from to be defended by one of the most expensive lawyers in Brazil, since he lived on the outskirts. These protests culminated in the scheduling of the first trial in June 2004.

=== Silvio Galicia ===
Silvio Galiza was sentenced on June 9, 2004, to 23 years and 5 months in prison, which after appeal were reduced to 18 years and later to 15. The main evidence for the conviction were five witnesses against him. The jury's court considered the crime a triple qualified homicide, and accepted the prosecution's thesis that pointed out that Galiza committed sexual abuse, killed and burned the victim's body.

Prosecutor Cleusa Boyda said that "for me that was not a finished case. Because I always had that feeling that there were more people involved in that, but how to know if the pastor himself denied the authorship of it and would never say ... that someone participated ". Prosecutor Davi Gallo said that Galiza is the author of the crime, but that it would be impossible for him to have done it alone.

=== UCKG ===
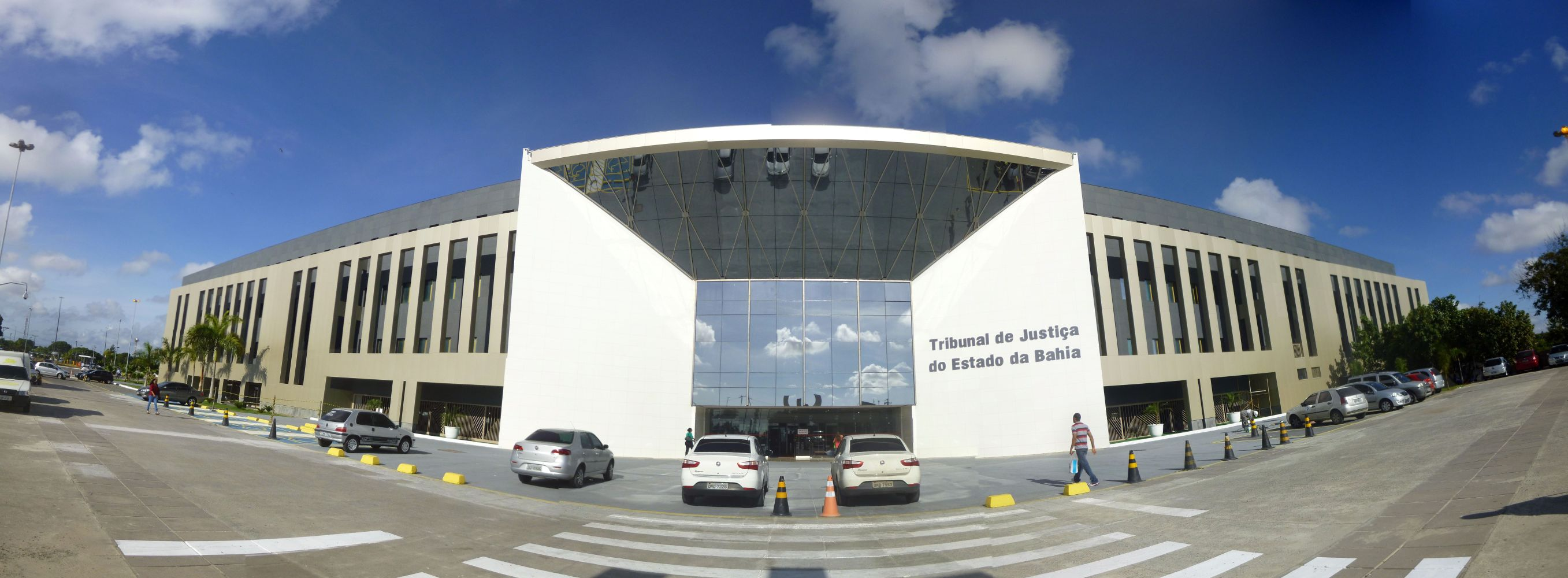
Alexius Salvador Tribunal de Justiça, Bahia.

In October 2007, the Superior Court of Justice, upholding the decision of the 2nd Civil Chamber of the Court of Justice (TJ) of Bahia, on March 14, determined that the Universal Church of the Kingdom of God indemnify Lucas's family in a million reais, for moral damages. The decision states that:

"The bond [of Galicia and Universal] is characterized by subordination, staggered directive power, remuneration, constitutive acts, among others. (...) As will be demonstrated, the occurrence of this heinous crime was only possible due to a careless attitude of the religious institution in question. In fact, such negligence is attributed to said church not only because of the poor choice of one of its preacher members, Auxiliary Pastor Sílvio Roberto Santos Galiza, but also because, over him, no surveillance was exercised satisfying."

The decision was contested by the church's defense, claiming that the pastor was not at work during the crime. However, the Superior Court of Justice of Bahia maintained the decision in favor of the prosecution, which alleged that the pastor asked Lucas to stay longer in the church and, in December 2008, with interest and monetary correction, the fine was estimated at two million reais, which was paid by Universal. In an interview with Agência Pública in January 2020, journalist Gilberto Nascimento, who researched other criminal activities linked to the IURD, commented on the church's behavior in the face of crimes:

Look, in these cases the church practically did not manifest itself. In the case of Lucas Terra (...), I interviewed the father and mother, the prosecutor, I spoke with journalists from Bahia who followed the case a lot, I spoke with lawyers and read everything that came out, I read the book by the boy's father, I read all the reports. I only saw the church speak at one point, that it was an individual action by the person who committed the crime. This is the case of that first pastor who was convicted, Silvio Galiza. In other cases, I don't remember having seen it, from everything I went to read.

(...)

I have not seen any manifestations of the church about these cases and surely they will say that they have nothing to do with it. They're going to say that João Monteiro de Castro [councilman, Universal worker and lead in the purchase of TV Rio who was executed when his car was shot with 20 rifle shots, also in Rio de Janeiro, in 2004] and Waldir Abrahão [another politician and Orange from Record, according to the book, and who also died mysteriously from a head injury in 2009] were no longer in the church. In the case of Valdeci Paiva de Jesus [pastor of Universal and newly elected at the time state deputy for the PSL, murdered in 2003 in Rio de Janeiro], there were no demonstrations by the church either. Valdeci's former advisor accused Bishop Rodrigues of involvement in the case, and Bishop Rodrigues accused the deputy's alternate. These are cases that have not been clarified.

=== New process ===
When interviewed by Linha Direta in 2006, Galiza was accompanied by seven lawyers and presented a new version of the crime, as on other occasions. Always claiming his innocence, but this time accusing three other members of the church, Bishop Fernando Aparecido da Silva, Pastor Joel Miranda Macedo and their security, Luis Claudio.

According to him, Lucas would have died for telling him that he saw Joel Miranda and Fernando Aparecido in a sexual act. The statement was accepted by the prosecution. The defense lawyer said that the complaint against his clients would be a strategy by Galicia, after Aparecido and Miranda removed him "when it was found that he (Silvio) was taking boys to sleep in the same bed as him, in the church in Rio Vermelho, in Salvador." In another interview, Galiza said he received threats from a Universal lawyer and was bribed to omit the facts of the crime.

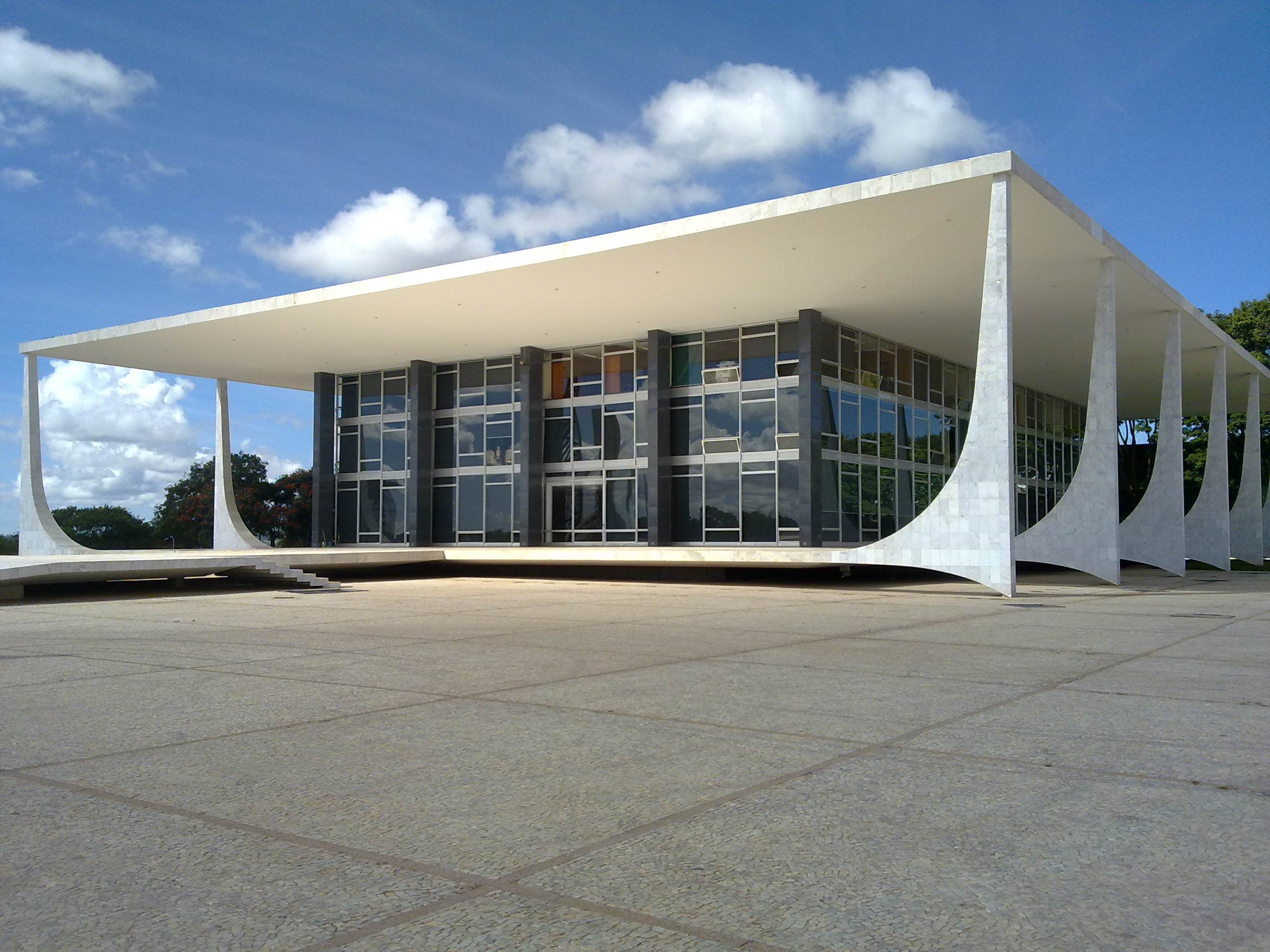
Supremo Tribunal Federal.

After the denouncement, in February 2008 a case was opened against Fernando Aparecido da Silva, who was arrested after spending some time on the run, and Joel Miranda Macedo, who remained on the run. Eighteen months after the start of the process, they received a habeas-corpus granted by the First Panel of the Supreme Federal Court (STF).

Fernando Aparecido da Silva and Joel Miranda Macedo were cleared in November 2013 by Judge Gelzi Almeida, who alleged lack of evidence. After Lucas' family appealed the decision, in September 2015 the Appeal was judged by the Court of Justice of Bahia (TJ-BA), with the judges unanimously deciding that Joel Miranda Macedo and Fernando Aparecido da Silva should be the popular jury.

After the defense of the two defendants appealed, the decision of the Court of Justice of Bahia was annulled in November 2018 by Minister Ricardo Lewandowski, of the STF. As part of the prosecution's action, the Public Ministry of Bahia said that the Attorney General's Office (PGR) would appeal the decision. Carlos Terra campaigned asking for a trial by the popular jury, until his death in February 2019. In a virtual session, Lewandowski voted against it again in March 2019 and Minister Cármen Lúcia asked for a view, preventing the pastors from going to the popular jury at that time.

As a last resort, the STF decided in September 2019 that Universal church pastors go to a popular jury. The popular jury hearing of the case was postponed in March 2020, due to the COVID-19 pandemic.

=== Further convictions ===
In 2021, a public petition was opened asking the Judiciary of the State of Bahia to set the date of the Jury Court; it was set for April 25, 2023, at the Ruy Barbosa Forum, in Salvador. In April 2023 UCKG pastors Fernando Aparecido da Silva and Joel Miranda were sentenced to 21 years in prison.

== Books and movie ==
In 2009, a documentary was released that portrays the simulation of the case in forty minutes. It was written and directed by Cláudio Factum and released in Bahia. In 2016, a non-profit book was launched, titled Lucas Terra - Betrayed by obedience. It was written by Lucas Terra's father and distributed independently. In 2019, the continuation of the first book, Betrayed by obedience, written by Carlos and Marion Terra, was released. The digital version was released on May 1, 2019.

== See also ==
- List of solved missing person cases (2000s)
- List of unsolved murders (2000–present)
- Political influence of Evangelicalism in Latin America
