= Diário de Noite =

- Editor-in-chief: Luís de Menezes
- Founded: 1 December 1919
- Ceased publication: December 1967
- Language: Portuguese
- Headquarters: São Tomé, Panjim, Portuguese India

Diário de Noite (Evening Diary) was a Portuguese language daily newspaper published from Panjim, Goa. The first issue was published on 1 December 1919. Luís de Menezes (1878-1938) was the founding editor of the newspaper. Diário de Noite had its offices in São Tomé, Panjim. It gained a wide Goan readership, and dealt with the events in the Indian mainland as well as Goan cultural issues.

Diário de Noite continued publication after the annexation of Goa by India. In the later period, it began carrying a page in English. The newspaper was closed down in December 1967.
