= Fabio Golombek =

Brazilian-American producer and director

Fabio Golombek is a Brazilian-American producer and director. In 2015 he is president of FJ Productions, which he founded in 2002. He has also been the senior producer of the award-winning show Planeta Brasil (TV Globo International) since 2003.

== Early life and education ==
Fabio earned a B.S. in Mechanical Engineering from FAAP, a master's degree in Radio and TV from San Diego State University and a B.A. in Social Communications (Cinema Studies) from the School of Arts and Communications at the University of Sao Paulo, in Brazil.

== Career ==
In 1983, after graduating from college, Golombek worked as assistant director on soap operas at Rede Bandeirantes TV. Later he was a director at JPO Productions, working on a number of programs produced for local networks. He moved to Los Angeles in 1990, and worked on a number of feature films such as Star Time, Killer Tomatoes Eat France, People Under the Stairs. In 1995 he co-founded Pacific Factory Entertainment and start to work with sports channels in the US (ESPN and ABC) and Brazil (SBT and Record TV), producing the IndyCar series, World Cup of Soccer and the Olympic Games, aside from several magazine format shows such as Shape Up (Fox Sports), Zona Zen (Sportv), Road to the Olympics (Directv) and others.

In 2002 Golombek founded FJ Productions to focus on entertainment shows and scripted programming. He produced the shows Shape Up (Fox Latin), Shop the World (SCG), Zen Zone (Sportv) and Hollywood News in 3D (Sky and Orange). After 2010, he produced Bed and Breakfast (Marcio Garcia dir.) which is distributed by PlayArt and Green Apple starring Dean Cain and Juliana Paes, Man Camp (Brian Brightly dir.) distributed by H2O and VMI with Mariel Hemingway, Dean Cain and Fernanda Machado. He also co-produced Open Road (Marcio Garcia dir.) distributed by Universal Pictures with Camilla Belle, Andy Garcia and Juliette Lewis.

Golombek later produced Like Sunday, Like Rain (written and directed by Frank Whaley) with Leighton Meester, Debra Messing and Billie Joe Armstrong which is distributed by Monterey and VMI) and which premiered at the Raindance Film Festival; Experimenter (Michael Almereyda dir.) that premiered at the Sundance Film Festival (2015) with Peter Sarsgaard and Winona Ryder distributed by Magnolia; and Bleiberg and Breaking Through (written and directed by John Swetnam) and distributed by Voltage and Xlrator.

In 2015 Golombek continues to act as president of FJ Productionsm where he is working on the development of feature films and documentaries and coordinates The Hollywood News Report TV (HBO and syndication), As Últimas de Hollywood and Sonywood News (Sony Entertainment), Hollywood Buzz (TNT) and Hollywood Uncut (Globosat +).

Golombek is a member of the Producers Guild of America (PGA), IDA and NALIP.

== Filmography ==
Date	Title	Position	Status	Director	Stars	Distribution
??	El Camino	Producer	Development	TBA		
??	Exile	Producer	Development	TBA		
2015	Captain Atlantis	Producer	Development	TBA		
2015	Hotel Everest	Executive Producer	Production	Claudia Sobral		
2015	Experimenter	Producer	Released	Michael Almereyda	Peter Sarsgaard, Winona Ryder	Magnolia Pictures, Bleiberg
2015	Breaking Through	Producer	Completed	John Swetnam	Julie Warner, Sophia Aguiar, Jordan Rodrigues	Xlrator, Voltage
2014	Like Sunday, Like Rain	Producer	Released	Frank Whaley	Leighton Meester, Debra Messing, Billie Joe Armstrong	Monterey Media, VMI
2013	Man Camp	Producer	Released	Brian Brightly	Dean Cain, Mariel Hemingway, Fernanda Machado	Green Apple, VMI, H2O
2013	Open Road	Associate Producer	Released	Marcio Garcia	Andy Garcia, Camilla Belle, Juliette Lewis	Universal Studios Home Entertainment
2010	Bed & Breakfast	Producer	Released	Marcio Garcia	Dean Cain, Juliana Paes	
2010	I Want Candy (short)	Associate Producer	Released	Theodore Melfi	Julia Almeida, Kimberly Quinn, Eamonn Roche	
1995	High Tomb	First Assistant Director	Released	Scott Gulbrandsen	Jeff Burr, Dena Rae Hayess	
1992	A Weekend with Barbara and Ingrid	First Assistant Director	Released	Gregory Neri	Jim Metzler, Anna Katarina, Michelle Holmes	
1992	Killer Tomatoes Eat France!	Second Second Assistant Director	Released	John De Bello	Marc Price, Angela Visser, Steve Lundquist	New World Pictures
1992	Star Time	Second Second Assistant Director		Alexander Cassini	Michael St. Gerard, John P. Ryan, Maureen Teefy	Northern Arts Entertainment
1992	Sua Excelência, O Candidato	First Assistant Director		Ricardo Pinto e Silva	Ivete Bonfá, Renato Borghi, Renato Consorte	
1991	The People Under the Stairs	Set Productions Assistant	Released	Wes Craven	Brandon Quintin Adams, Everett McGill, Wendy Robie	MCA / Universal Home Video

== TV ==
Date	Title	Channel
2015-	Sonywood News	Sony
2015-	SPACE Reporte	SPACE
2012-	TNT Buzz	TNT
2012-2013	Hollywood News 3D	Sky Italy / Orange
2011	Hollywood Uncut	Globosat
2009-	The Hollywood News Report	HBO and Syndication
2006-2009	Starz The Hollywood Reporter	Starz
2003-	Planeta Brasil	Globo International
2003-2007	Shop the World	
