= Tania Khalill =

Brazilian actress (born 1977)

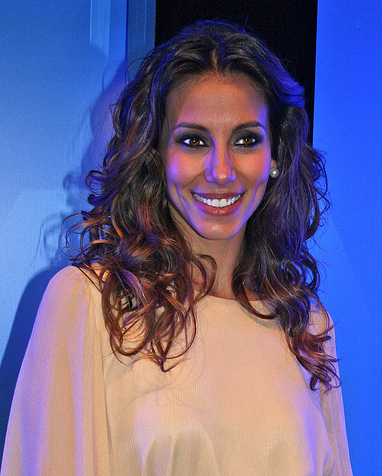
- Khalill in 2009
- Born: Tânia Calil Padis Campos; 8 July 1977 (age 49); São Paulo, Brazil
- Education: Mackenzie Presbyterian University
- Occupation: Actress
- Years active: 1995–present
- Height: 1.66 m (5 ft 5 in)
- Spouse: Jair Oliveira (m. 2005)
- Children: 2

Tânia Calil Campos de Oliveira (née Padis; born 8 July 1977), known professionally as Tania Khalill, is a Brazilian actress.

== Early life ==
Khalill was born to pediatrician Emiliano Campos and psychologist Terezinha Calil Campos in São Paulo's Partridge's neighborhood. Her stage name Khalill is derived from her last name Calil. She is the second of three daughters and is of Syrian and Lebanese descent.

She studied at Brazilian Baptist College and graduated in 2000 from Mackenzie University with a degree in psychology, although she has never practiced psychology as a profession.

Tania Khalill practiced ballet for 16 years, between the ages of 6 and 22. She danced professionally for five years in the Paulista Dance Company, formed by the classical ballet dancer Paula Castro, and lived in Cuba for five months to study at the Cuban National Ballet School, one of the most respected in the world. She also starred in advertising campaigns. Although she was represented by Elite modeling agency, she has never been a runway model.

To improve as a dancer, Tania sought inspiration in the theater. She later decided to invest in an acting career, so she studied drama for seven years and graduated from Carmina Actors School. She took courses at Beto Silveira, a Theatre-Macunaíma school, and attended a course for television and theater professionals at Actors School Wolf Maya. She also attended the Theatre Workshop of Interpretation of Oswaldo Boaretto for five years. Tania also studied speech and presentation with SENAC TV.

== Career ==
In 2002, Khalill premiered on television in the supporting cast of the soap opera, Sabor da Paixão. In 2004, she acted in the show Galera on TV Cultura, where she played the part of Nalva Ferrari, a samba dancer. The show was based on the novel Senhora do Destino, by Aguinaldo Silva. In 2006, Tania played Nikki Ortega in Cobras & Lagartos. In 2008, she participated in TV series Casos e Acasos and Guerra & Paz. In 2009, Tania played the part of the passionate Duda in Caminho das Índias, based on the novels.

Khalill made her stage debut in 1995, in a play by Naum Alves. Since then, she has appeared in works by Nelson Rodrigues; Short Comedy by Luis Fernando Verissimo and directed by Wolf Maya; The Suitcase, by Larry Shue and directed by Isser Koriki, along with José Rubens Chachá. In 2002, she participated in an SCYSD short film, a film course design at FAAP. In 2005, she joined the cast of another short, The Opposite Sex, directed by Hudson Glauber In 2009, she appeared in the short Innocent directed by Thiago Luciano and Bob Shultz, which was shown at the 13th International Film Festival Latino in Los Angeles, United States.

Khalill was on the cover of the following magazines: Boa Forma, Claudia, Manequim, Corpo a Corpo, among others. Sensual Held for VIP magazine, with cover of the publication in September 2004, was still present in the list of 100 Sexiest Women in the World in the same magazine that year, and was also considered one of the 25 sexiest women in the annual ranking of the journal This is People in 2004 and 2009. She refused the invitation to pose nude for Playboy magazine.

In 2010, Great Little attended the show, the children's musical based on the book was titled CD released by Jair Oliveira in 2009, and was nominated for a Grammy Latino in the same year. She debuted the piece with text by Mario Viana and opposite Dalton Vigh.

The actress, involved with a children's project, launched in October 2010, Acampamento de Férias 2 - A Arvore da Vida, where she plays Débora. In the film, the actress will work with Murilo Rosa and Isaiah Washington in the sci-fi Area Q, a co-production between Brazil and the United States, which deals with the appearance of aliens in Quixadá and Quixeramobim, Ceará cities. She played the role of Valkyrie, a reporter at the service of a self-interested superpower. The film is directed by Gerson Sanginitto Halder Gomes and production of the recordings take place in Ceará and Los Angeles.

In 2011, Tania was in the telenovela Fina Estampa, playing the teacher Letícia. In 2012, interpreted Ayla in the telenovela Salve Jorge of Glória Perez. In 2013, she played a cabaret dancer Dália, the telenovela Joia Rara.

== Personal life ==
On December 10, 2005, she married singer Jair Oliveira at the Nossa Senhora do Perpétuo Socorro church in São Paulo. Oliveira, known at the time as Jairzinho, was a member of the Balão Mágico group. She met her husband when Oliveira was singing in a bar in São Paulo. The couple has two daughters, Isabella, born on July 10, 2007, at the São Luiz hospital, and Laura was born on March 5, 2011, also at São Luiz Hospital.

== Filmography ==
=== Television ===
Year	Title	Role	Notes	Ref.
2002	Sabor da Paixão	Sabrina	Cameo	
2004	Galera	Plurabelle	Professor of history	
2004	Senhora do Destino	Marinalva Ferreira da Silva (Nalva)		
2006	Cobras & Lagartos	Nicole Ortega (Nikki)		
2007	Pé na Jaca	Paula	Episode: "March 20, 2007"	
2008	Guerra & Paz	Vivi	Episode: "Ricos & Pobres"	
2008	Casos e Acasos	Fabiana	Episode: "O Colar, O Cachorro e O DVD"	
2008	Casos e Acasos	Iara	Episode: "A Nova Namorada, o Chefe e o Dia Fértil"	
2009	Caminho das Índias	Maria Eduarda de Moraes Garrido (Duda)		
2011	Acampamento de Férias 2	Débora	Season 2	
2011	Fina Estampa	Letícia Fernandes Prado		
2012	Salve Jorge	Ayla		
2013	Joia Rara	Dália Hérnandez		
2016	Grandes Pequeninos Chefs	Presenter		
2017	Prata da Casa	Talita	Episode: "Kama Sutrex"	
2018	Bridecon	Spencer		
2019	Mrs. Fletcher	Sales Lady	Episode: "Free Sample"	

=== Films ===
Year	Title	Role	Notes
2009	Inocente		Short film
2011	Area Q	Valquíria	
2016	My Hindu Friend	Rosemary	
2017	Eu Fico Loko: O Filme	Martha Coelho	

=== Internet ===
Year	Title	Role
2013–present	Grandes Pequeninos Chefs	Presenter

== Theatre ==
Year	Title	Role
1995	No Natal a Gente Vem Te Buscar	
2003	Curta Comédia	
2007	O Mala	Tansy
2010	Grandes Pequeninos - O Show	
2010	Vamos?	
2015	Dez Encontros	
2017	Mary Poppins - O Musical	Mary Poppins
