= Rio Heroes =

Brazilian drama television series

- Genre: Action; Drama; Sports
- Starring: Murilo Rosa; Juliana Araripe; Bruno Bellarmino; Roney Facchini; Priscila Fantin; Giovanni Gallo; Luiz Guilherme; Ronny Kriwat; Rafael Losso; Miguel Nader; Duda Nagle
- Country of origin: Brazil
- Original language: Portuguese
- No. of seasons: 2
- No. of episodes: 10

Production
- Production location: São Paulo
- Cinematography: André Modugno
- Production companies: Mixer Films; NBCUniversal; Fox Networks Group

Original release
- Network: Fox Premium
- Release: February 24, 2018 – June 7, 2019

Rio Heroes is a Brazilian drama television series created by Fabio Danesi, Camila Raffanti and Alexandre Soares Silva, and produced by Mixer Films, NBCUniversal and Fox Networks Group: the 1st season premiered on Fox Premium on February 24, 2018, and the 2nd season premiered on May 10, 2019.

The series is based on a wrestling championship that actually existed between the years 2007 and 2009 and which became known for its extremely crude and violent nature. Starring Murilo Rosa in the lead role, Rio Heroes follows the story of Jorge Pereira, a jiu-jitsu athlete who did not conform to the increasing limitations imposed by wrestling federations that prevented the execution of certain blows and forced the use of gloves.

== Premise ==
The series is based on the real story of the Brazilian wrestler Jorge Pereira, who decided to create a Vale tudo championship.

== Cast ==
- Murilo Rosa as Jorge Pereira
- Juliana Araripe as Carol
- Bruno Bellarmino as Jair Cabeçada
- Roney Facchini as Rogério
- Priscila Fantin as Claudinha Pitbull
- Giovanni Gallo as Max Werneck
- Luiz Guilherme as Mestre Galdino
- Ronny Kriwat as Pipo
- Rafael Losso as Eric
- Miguel Nader as Goya
- Duda Nagle as Rogerinho
- André Ramiro as Basilio
