= Guilherme Zaiden =

Brazilian YouTuber

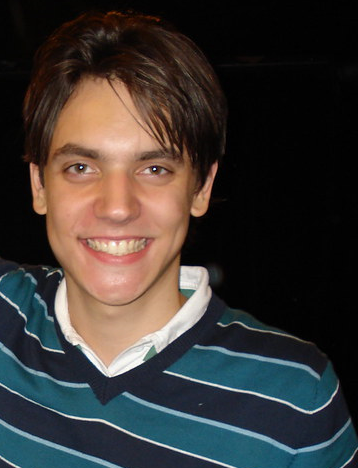
- Born: 1989 (age 36–37); Brasília, Brazil
- Occupation: YouTube personality

YouTube information
- Channel: gzaiden
- Years active: 2006–present
- Genres: comedy; vlog
- Subscribers: 59.7 thousand
- Views: 20.2 million

Guilherme Zaiden, better known by his YouTube username gzaiden, is a Brazilian YouTube personality and content creator. He published his first viral videos in 2006, being considered the first YouTuber in Brazil, and a pioneer of the so-called "vlogger era". His video "Confissões de um emo", recorded in 2006, in February 2015 was still the most viewed Brazilian video on YouTube, with more than six million views, being elected by the news website "GaúchaZH" as one of the 10 most famous memes in Brazil.

== Career ==
In 2006, when the first vlogs became popular in the United States, YouTube, launched just a year earlier, with about 50 million users, two million of which were in Brazil. At that time, an 18-year-old young man from Brasilia, Guilherme Zaiden, motivated by the lack of creativity in Brazilian humor, essentially because of a heteronormative culture, with homophobic and sexist tendencies, began making home videos, with a hand held camera and talking to himself for hours on end. He created characters that would make him famous, such as: an Orkut addict, a prejudiced pastor and an emo. The first video, "Confissões de um emo", was posted on July 21, 2006. In the video, Zaiden staged as the character "Bonequinho de Porcelana", a boy dissatisfied with being labeled as an emo. In 2015, celebrating twenty years of Internet in Brazil, the news website GaúchaZH chose the video "Confissões de um emo", by Guilherme Zaiden, as one of the 10 most famous memes in Brazil. On February 13 of the same year, "Confissões de um emo" continued to be the Brazilian video with most views, being one of only two with more than six million hits. As of 2017, the video had 7 million views.

Guilherme Zaiden was also, together with Clarah Averbuckee, one of the creators of the term blocks, derived from the English words blog and book, obtaining in 2006, on average, 50 million views in the shared productions, resulting in books based on the reports registered in the videos posted and acclaimed on blog pages. Despite the success of millions of views on the videos he produced, Zaiden's insecurity made him not take advantage of the success, and abandoned the platform about a year later, not even taking advantage of Google's partnership program, which was launched in 2007, where the company gives a portion of advertising revenue to those who produce videos. Despite this hiatus, in 2008 and 2009 Zaiden was still referred to as a champion of views and was considered an Internet celebrity, which led to Globo's invitation to participate in the soap opera Caminho das Índias in January 2009.

In 2015, Zaiden returned to YouTuber activity, taking a break shortly after. Despite posting few videos after 2007, in 2018 the YouTube channel "Zaiden" was still considered a reference in Internet humor.

In 2017, the YouTuber posted some revealing photos on Instagram, showing his current good physique.
