= Area Q =

2011 film directed by Gerson Sanginitto

Area Q.
- Directed by: Gerson Sanginitto
- Written by: Julia Camara; Gerson Sanginitto
- Starring: Isaiah Washington; Tania Khalill; Murilo Rosa
- Cinematography: Carina Sanginitto
- Edited by: David A. Davidson; Helgi Thor
- Music by: Perry La Marca
- Production companies: Reef Pictures; Solventdreams; Sophia Filmes
- Distributed by: California Filmes (Brazil)
- Release dates: October 22, 2011 (Hollywood Film Festival); April 13, 2012 (Brazil)
- Running time: 100 minutes
- Countries: Brazil; United States
- Languages: Portuguese; English
- Budget: $4 million
- Box office: $189,895

Area Q. (Área Q in Brazilian Portuguese) is a 2011 American-Brazilian science fiction film directed by Gerson Sanginitto and starring Isaiah Washington, Tania Khalill, and Murilo Rosa. It was shot in Los Angeles and multiple locations in the Brazilian state of Ceará.

== Plot ==
The film follows the story of Thomas Mathews, a well-known and award-winning reporter who suffers a big impact with the disappearance of his son. A year later, Thomas has not discovered anything about the kidnapping and remains obsessed with it to the point of being about to lose his home and his job.

In order to help him, his boss offers a special project, in which the journalist must investigate cases of UFO sightings, close encounters of the first, second and third kind and even abductions. For this task he must travel to Ceará, Brazil, in the cities of Quixadá and Quixeramobim, known as "Area Q".

It is during investigations that Thomas meets João Batista, a man who has many answers about what is happening in this area and also about his son. Gradually, he begins to realize that he is about to experience the greatest discovery of his life.

== Cast ==
- Isaiah Washington as Thomas Mathews
- Murilo Rosa as João Batista
- Tania Khalill as Valquiria
- Ricardo Conti as Eliosvaldo
- Leslie Lewis Sword as Carol Matthews
- Jordan Jones as Peter Mathews
- Jenny Vilim as Cynthia
