= Bed & Breakfast (2010 film) =

- Promotional poster
- Directed by: Márcio Garcia
- Written by: Leland Douglas
- Produced by: Fabio Golombek; Theodore Melfi; Uri Singer; Márcio Garcia
- Starring: Juliana Paes; Dean Cain; Bill Engvall; Julian Stone; John Savage; Julia Duffy; Eric Roberts; Rodrigo Lombardi; Marcos Pasquim
- Cinematography: Craig Kief
- Production companies: BB Film Productions; FJ Productions
- Release date: December 10, 2010 (Brazil)
- Running time: 93 minutes
- Countries: United States; Brazil
- Languages: English and Portuguese

Bed & Breakfast is a 2010 romantic comedy directed by Márcio Garcia and written by Leland Douglas. Produced by B.B. Film Productions and F.J. Productions, the movie was shot in Rio de Janeiro, Brazil and in Los Angeles. The film stars Dean Cain, Juliana Paes, Eric Roberts, John Savage, Bill Engvall, Marcos Pasquim, Rodrigo Lombardi and more.

The story is about Ana Vilanova (Juliana Paes), a saleswoman from a large department store in Rio who discovers she has inherited property in the wine county of California. She could never expect what she would find in Webster, a small country town.

== Synopsis ==
Jake Sullivan (Dean Cain) is the almost-ex-husband of movie star Amanda Cox (Kimberly Quinn). He owns a little bed and breakfast in the wine county. Ana Vilanova (Juliana Paes) is a Brazilian woman in love with a beach playboy (Marcos Pasquim) and whose brother (Daniel Ávila) is in trouble with the mob. Convinced that she owns the same piece of property on which Jake's B&B is located, Ana heads to California, intent on evicting him, selling the property and helping her brother, but soon realizes that she likes Jake quite a bit more than she likes her beach bum boyfriend.

== Cast ==
- Dean Cain as Jake
- Juliana Paes as Ana
- Bill Engvall as Pete Sullivan
- Julian Stone as Victor
- John Savage as Mr. Harvey
- Julia Duffy as Mrs. Harvey
- Eric Roberts as Mr. Hopewell
- Jamie Anderson as Caroline
- Meredith Bishop as Celeste
- Kimberly Dollar as Waiter
- Murilo Elbas as Thug One
- Jesse Jake Golden as Girl One
- Calvin Jung as Mr. Okata
- Débora Lamm as Gabriela
- Ted Lange as Judge / Mediator
- Júnior Lisboa as Thug Two
- Rodrigo Lombardi as Bartolomeu
- Lydia Look as Ms. Okata
- Priscila Marinho as Flavia
- Zilah Mendoza as Maria
- Emily Nelson as Hank
- Marcos Pasquim as Gustavo
- Kimberly Quinn as Amanda
- Roseli as Girl Two
- Luiza Valdetaro as Babita
- Daniel Ávila as Paulo
