= Like Sunday, Like Rain =

- Directed by: Frank Whaley
- Written by: Frank Whaley
- Produced by: Fabio Golombek; James Jones; Jimi Jones; Josh Kesselman; Danny Sherman; Uri Singer
- Starring: Leighton Meester; Debra Messing; Billie Joe Armstrong; Julian Shatkin
- Cinematography: Jimi Jones
- Music by: Ed Harcourt
- Production company: BB Film Productions
- Distributed by: Monterey Media
- Release dates: September 27, 2014 (Raindance); March 6, 2015 (United States)
- Running time: 104 minutes
- Country: United States
- Language: English
- Box office: $28,208

Like Sunday, Like Rain is a 2014 American independent drama film written and directed by Frank Whaley, and distributed by Monterey Media. The film stars Leighton Meester, Debra Messing, Billie Joe Armstrong, and Julian Shatkin in his film debut. The film follows a cello prodigy, Reggie, and his latest caretaker, Eleanor, as they develop a friendship over the course of a summer in New York City. It won at the Williamsburg Film Festival for Best Feature and Best Director for Whaley himself.

Filming took place over 20 days in all five boroughs of New York City, New York. Following a world premiere at the Raindance Film Festival in September 2014, and a US premiere at the Mill Valley Film Festival in October 2014, the film was given a limited theatrical release in March 2015.

== Plot ==
In Brooklyn, 23-year-old Eleanor breaks up with her failing and disloyal musician boyfriend, Dennis. She moves out of Dennis' apartment and crashes at a friend's place. Unfortunately, Dennis refuses to let her go and confronts her at her work where Dennis' tirade costs Eleanor her job. Eleanor tries to seek family support, but her family is not willing to help, so she crashes at her friend's place one last time before seeking a temporary job. On the Upper West Side, 12-year-old Reggie, a cellist and all-around genius who is bored and skeptical, lives a solitary life as his parents do not have time for him and delegate caretakers to watch after him. His most recent caretaker had to go back to Panama so Reggie's mother, Barbara, posts an ad for a temporary sitter; Eleanor answers the call.

Despite being a genius, Reggie is treated like a child. He does his best to get around his mother's arrangements by bribing the people in his life to spread the idea that he is obedient. Upon meeting him, Eleanor is touched to hear Reggie's composition Like Sunday, Like Rain and the two strike an unlikely friendship. As summer camp approaches, Eleanor tries to get Reggie to go, but he blows it off to hang in the city for the next six weeks. At this time, Dennis stalks Eleanor, wanting to talk and get back together, however, Eleanor makes it clear that they are broken up. Dennis promises to get back at her for breaking his guitar, but he never returns.

Later, while hanging out at the park, Reggie becomes fascinated with Eleanor. Eleanor's father is terminally ill and she has to go upstate to see him. Eleanor originally plans to go away for a few days, but Reggie suggests he go with her and they travel to her hometown. Reggie gets to see Eleanor's life and her dysfunctional family. Eleanor's sister works at a seedy bar, while her mother and uncle are carefree about Eleanor's father. Looking after Reggie's interest and unable to stand the situation at home, Eleanor takes him to a hotel to have some peace and quiet. There Eleanor tells Reggie how she met Dennis, the messy relations with her family, and that she nearly went to Juilliard to study the cornet. Reggie is intrigued that Eleanor can play. She explains she wanted to play the trumpet, but chose the cornet instead; she never made it to Juilliard due to lack of funds. Before they go to sleep, Reggie promises to write a cornet piece to include Eleanor in his single.

The following day, Eleanor visits her father and Reggie can only watch from a distance, seeing Eleanor become very emotional. Dropping off the car she borrowed from her uncle, she is enraged at how he could be so nonchalant about the illness of his brother. Her uncle and mother become defensive and Eleanor storms out, declaring she will never return, and escorts Reggie back home.

As the summer is nearly over, Reggie has formed a close bond with Eleanor, but her job is only temporary and another sitter has arrived to take over. He has trouble accepting Eleanor's departure and wants her to stay. Eleanor feels the need to regroup at home to get her life back in order and they promise to stay in touch with each other before emotionally embracing. Eleanor kisses Reggie lightly and bids him farewell. Reggie resumes his lonely, privileged life, with Eleanor on his mind. On the doorstep of Eleanor's family home, Reggie arranges a gift for her: a cornet with the revised notes to Like Sunday, Like Rain. Reggie resumes playing the cello and, at a distance, Eleanor plays her part.

== Cast ==
- Leighton Meester as Eleanor Logan
- Debra Messing as Barbara Kipper
- Olga Merediz as Esa
- Billie Joe Armstrong as Dennis
- Julian Shatkin as Reggie
- Sammy Pignalosa as Raj
- Georgia Ximenes Lifsher as Sylvia
- James McCaffrey as Dale
- Olivia Luccardi as Shelly
- Luiza Valdetaro as Corrina
- Tamara Torres as Bolia
- Mary Costa as Mrs. Tydings (uncredited)

== Production ==
Like Sunday, Like Rain is Frank Whaley's fourth feature film. Whaley was inspired to tell a good story, and interested in the subject of "childhood, and the loneliness and feelings of isolation and hopelessness that can sometimes accompany it". His main source of inspiration was New York City, saying

I lived in New York City for over 30 years and was always fascinated by the lives of people there, how they drift in and out of each other's paths, sometimes for only a short time. But these sorts of encounters can have a lasting impression. 'Like Sunday, Like Rain' is a story about two people from opposite ends of the universe who just happen to meet one day."

Whaley says the biggest challenge with this film was to stay true to the story through the entire process and not change it based on investors' perspectives.

The film was shot in New York City, New York in 20 days, including September 2013. Filming took place in all five boroughs of the city, Yonkers, and Long Island.

English singer-songwriter, Ed Harcourt was the composer of the film's orchestral score.

== Release ==
The film had its world premiere at the Raindance Film Festival in the United Kingdom on September 24, 2014. Its US premiere was held on October 6, 2014 at Mill Valley Film Festival. The film also screened at Hamptons International Film Festival, CBGB Music and Film Festival, Washington West Film Festival, Orlando Film Festival, Williamstown Film Festival, Naples Film Festival, Napa Valley Film Festival, Williamsburg Film Festival and the STARZ Denver Film Festival.

Monterey Media acquired the distribution rights in the United States in October 2014. The film's U.S. theatrical release began in March 2015 in select cities. Like Sunday Like Rain grossed $28,208 in the United States during its theatrical run. A VOD release followed on April 21, 2015.

== Reception ==
On review aggregator website Rotten Tomatoes, the film holds a 50% approval rating based on 18 reviews, with an average rating of 5.70/10. On Metacritic, which uses a weighted average, it has a score of 43 out of 100, based on six critics, indicating "mixed or average" reviews.

Neil Genzingler of The New York Times praised Meester and Shatkin, identifying the characters' relationship as a "well-played character study", while calling Messing's role "a grating caricature" and writing that the plot "thins out toward the end as it turns too obviously sentimental". Gary Goldstein of the Los Angeles Times also praised Meester and Shatkin for "deftly navigating roles that could have become phony or clichéd", and concluded: "A touching ending caps a quite wonderful journey, one that's greatly enhanced by Jimi Jones' fine camera work and a lovely score by Ed Harcourt".

Jess Hassenger for The A.V. Club gave the film a C+ rating, writing that the film "morph[s] into a quieter, more reflective version of the Brittany Murphy/Dakota Fanning comedy Uptown Girls." John Hartl of The Seattle Times gave the film 2.5/4 stars, writing of the ending, "The pace slows, the music swells and Whaley's script threatens to turn sentimental and evasive. Whaley has made a provocative, well-acted movie about infatuations that turn awkward, but he struggles".

Justin Lowe of The Hollywood Reporter thought the film "shows an initial glimmer of promise", but ultimately its "playful tone and passable performances can't overcome an unremarkable premise and predictable plotting". Writing for The Village Voice, Nick Schager said the film "boasts what may be the most insufferably precocious protagonist in cinema history". Wes Greene of Slant gave the film 1 out of 4 stars, writing "Despite all the supposed goodwill Whaley wrings out of Eleanor and Reggie's mutually spirit-enriching friendship, the film evinces a perpetual streak of cynicism".

The film won six awards at the 2014 Williamsburg Independent Film Festival, including Best Film, Best Director and Best Actress and Featured Actors - Leighton Meester, Billie Joe Armstrong and Debra Messing.
