= List of Os Caras de Pau episodes =

Below is a List of Os Caras de Pau episodes.

== Series overview ==
Season	Episodes	Originally released	
Season	Episodes	First released	Last released
1	37	April 4, 2010	December 26, 2010
2	23	April 3, 2011	September 18, 2011

== Episodes ==
=== Season 1 (2010) ===
No. overall	No. in season	Title	Original release date	Prod. code	São Paulo viewers (millions)
1	1	"Ovos do ofício" "Egg of office"	April 4, 2010	227	0.580
2	2	"Na busca pela saúde" "In the quest for health"	April 11, 2010	228	2,2
3	3	"Aula de etiqueta para Jorginho" "Class of etiquette for Jorginho"	April 18, 2010	230	2,4
4	4	"Como enfrentar o medo?" "How to if cope with fear?"	April 25, 2010	223	2,2
5	5	"Mãos à Obra" "Get to work"	May 2, 2010	229	1,7
6	6	"Dia Das Mães" "Mother's Day"	May 9, 2010	236	2,2
7	7	"Tecnologia" "Technology"	May 16, 2010	241	2,1
8	8	"Jorginho e Pedrão tentam arranjar namoradas" "Jorginho and Pedrão try to get Girlfriends"	May 23, 2010	233-234	2,4
9	9	"De boas ações a Bolsa de Valores está cheia" "The Stock Exchange is Full of Good Actions"	May 30, 2010	232	2,0
10	10	"Se Essa Moda Pega?" "If This Fashion Picks?"	June 6, 2010	237	2,2
11	11	"Copa do Mundo" "World Cup"	June 20, 2010	235	2,0
12	12	"Vivendo e Aprendendo" "Living and Learning"	July 4, 2010	239	2,4
13	13	"Comunicação" "Communication"	July 11, 2010	231	2,6
14	14	"É domingo" "It's Sunday"	July 18, 2010	245	2,6
15	15	"Amizade" "Friendship"	July 25, 2010	240	2,6
16	16	"Queimando o filme" "Burning the Movie"	August 1, 2010	301	2,6
17	17	"Dia dos Pais" "Father's Day"	August 8, 2010	305	2,4
18	18	"Juntando a fome com a vontade de comer" "Joining hunger with the desire to eat"	August 15, 2010	304	2,2
19	19	"Caindo na real" "Falling on reality"	August 22, 2010	303	2,6
20	20	"Mentira dessa" "That Lie"	August 29, 2010	302	2,4
21	21	"Façam suas apostas!" "Do your bets!"	September 5, 2010	307-308	2,4
22	22	"Esportistas Armadores" "Assembler Athletes"	September 12, 2010	309	2,4
23	23	"É como diz o ditado" "It's like the saying goes"	September 19, 2010	306	2,6
24	24	"E o tempo levou!" "Gone with the time!"	September 26, 2010	311-313	2,2
25	25	"Peque e pague" "Sin and pay"	October 3, 2010	301	2,4
26	26	"Pra tudo tem um jeitinho" "For everything there's a way"	October 10, 2010	305	2,6
27	27	"A primeira vez a gente Nunca esquece!" "The first time we never forgets!"	October 17, 2010	304	2,3
28	28	"As Aparências Enganam!" "The appearances are deceiving!"	October 24, 2010	303	1,9
29	29	"Correndo Contra o Tempo" "Running Against Time"	October 31, 2010	302	2,2
30	30	"Uma Dupla Pior que a Encomenda" "A double worse than the order"	November 7, 2010	307	2,8
31	31	"Viagem a dois" "Travel to two"	November 14, 2010	309	2,0
32	32	"Dando Conta do Recado" "Taking care of the errand"	November 21, 2010	303	2,2
33	33	"A Regra é clara" "The rule is clear"	November 28, 2010	304	2,4
34	34	"Ilha de Valkikar" "Valkikar Island"	December 5, 2010	305	2,2
35	35	"Entrando numa Fria" "Entering in a trouble"	December 12, 2010	306	2,1
36	36	"Um Problemetion em Massachusetts Ohio" "A "problem" in Massachusetts Ohio"	December 19, 2010	310	2,4
37	37	"Um Natal sem Lembranças" "A Christmas without memories"	December 26, 2010	311	3,1

=== Season 2 (2011) ===
No. overall	No. in season	Title	Original release date	Prod. code	São Paulo viewers (millions)
38	1	"O pecado mora em frente" "The sin lives ahead"	April 3, 2011	401	2,5
39	2	"Promessa é dúvida!" "Promise is a doubt!"	April 10, 2011	402	2,1
40	3	"Insegurança máxima" "Maximum Insecurity"	April 17, 2011	403	2,2
41	4	"O clima não compensa" "Climate does not pay"	April 24, 2011	404	2,6
42	5	"Arrumar Emprego dá Trabalho" "Get a work takes work"	May 1, 2011	405	2,4
43	6	"Cara de Pau é a Mãe" "The mother is poker facer"	May 8, 2011	406	1,9
44	7	"Templo é Dinheiro" "Temple is Money"	May 15, 2011	407	2,7
45	8	"Causa e Defeito" "Cause and Defect"	May 15, 2011	408	2,4
46	9	"Cidadão Quem?" "Citizen Who?"	May 29, 2011	409	2,2
47	10	"Hoje é Dia de Manias" "Today is Day of Manias"	June 5, 2011	410	2,2
48	11	"Namoro:que seja de Terno enquanto dure" "Dating: what is suit while it lasts"	June 12, 2011	411	2,2
49	12	"Desencontro Marcado" "Os Caras de Pau: mismatch marked"	June 19, 2011	412	2,2
50	13	"Os 5 sentidos" "The 5 senses"	July 3, 2011	413	2,2
51	14	"Ataque e defesa do Consumidor" "Attack and defense of the Consumer"	July 10, 2011	414	1,7
52	15	"Gafes Indomaveis" "Gafes Indomaveis"	July 17, 2011	415	2,1
53	16	"A pressa é inimiga da refeição" "Haste is the enemy of the meal"	July 24, 2011	416	2,4
54	17	"Inteligência ou Morte" "Intelligence or Death"	July 31, 2011	417	2,6
55	18	"Musica que da DÓ" "Music to the DOH"	August 7, 2011	418	2,1
56	19	"Ó o Pai aí Ó" "Look dad in there, look"	August 14, 2011	419	2,4
57	20	"O Negócio é o Seguinte" "The thing is..."	August 21, 2011	420	3,4
58	20	"Ciumeira nem Beira" "Jealousy or Edge"	September 04, 2011	420	4,4
60	22	"Tem Hora para Tudo" "Have Time for Everything"	September 18, 2011	420	4,8
