= Experimenter (film) =

2015 biographical drama film

Experimenter: The Stanley Milgram Story
- The theatrical release poster
- Directed by: Michael Almereyda
- Written by: Michael Almereyda
- Produced by: Uri Singer; Fabio Golombek; Aimee Schoof; Isen Robbins; Danny A. Abeckaser; Per Melita; Joseph White; Michael Almereyda
- Starring: Peter Sarsgaard; Winona Ryder; Jim Gaffigan; Edoardo Ballerini; John Palladino; Kellan Lutz; Dennis Haysbert; Danny A. Abeckaser; Taryn Manning; Anton Yelchin; John Leguizamo
- Cinematography: Ryan Samul
- Edited by: Kathryn J. Schubert
- Music by: Bryan Senti
- Production companies: BB Film Productions; FJ Productions; Intrinsic Value Films; Jeff Rice Films; 2B Productions
- Distributed by: Magnolia Pictures; Bleiberg Entertainment (present, Non-US)
- Release dates: January 25, 2015 (2015 Sundance Film Festival); October 16, 2015 (U.S.)
- Running time: 98 minutes
- Country: United States
- Language: English
- Box office: $224,145

Experimenter: The Stanley Milgram Story also known as the Experimenter, is a 2015 American biographical drama film written, directed and co-produced by Michael Almereyda. It depicts the Milgram experiment in 1961 by social psychologist Stanley Milgram. The film, co-produced by and starring Danny A. Abeckaser, also stars Peter Sarsgaard, Winona Ryder, Jim Gaffigan, Kellan Lutz, Dennis Haysbert, Anthony Edwards, Lori Singer, Josh Hamilton, Anton Yelchin, John Leguizamo.

== Plot ==
The film is based on the true story of famed social psychologist Stanley Milgram, who in 1961 conducted a series of radical behavior experiments at Yale University that tested the willingness of ordinary humans to obey an authority figure while administering electric shocks to strangers. In the first half of the film, it is shown how the experiments are conducted, with nearly every test subject succumbing to the pressure of the circumstances and administering shocks to a stranger, despite the stranger begging him to stop. Between the experiments, it is shown how Milgram meets Alexandra (or Sasha), who will become his wife and mother of two children.

The second half of the film shows how Milgram struggles with the public outcry about the ethics of the experiments and how his career advances as he becomes a professor in New York City and continues to study social interactions and social pressure in more benign experimental settings, including the small-world experiment, the lost-letter experiment, the street-corner (or gawking) experiment, the familiar stranger experiment, and various experiments that he makes his students carry out.

Archive footage occurs frequently, either as recordings that Milgram watches or as a backdrop for entire scenes. Milgram's work continues until he dies from a heart attack at the age of 51. In the final scene, the street-corner experiment is repeated in the present day, with a cameo of the real-life Sasha Milgram. In a mid-credits scene, more archival footage is shown.

== Cast ==
- Peter Sarsgaard as Stanley Milgram
- Winona Ryder as Alexandra "Sasha" Milgram
- Jim Gaffigan as James McDonough
- Edoardo Ballerini as Paul Hollander
- John Palladino as John Williams
- Kellan Lutz as William Shatner
- Dennis Haysbert as Ossie Davis
- Danny A. Abeckaser as Braverman
- Taryn Manning as Mrs. Lowe
- Anthony Edwards as Miller
- Lori Singer as Florence Asch
- Josh Hamilton as Tom Shannon
- Anton Yelchin as Rensaleer
- Adriana Randall as Mrs. Stein
- Donnie Keshawarz as Bruno
- Michael Siberry as George Bellak
- Ned Eisenberg as Solomon Asch
- John Leguizamo as Taylor
- Tom Farrell as Whittaker
- Frank Harts as Washington
- Pascal Yen-Pfister as Serge Moscovici
- Lucy Fava as Michele Milgram
- Emily Tremaine as Sheila Jarcho
- Harold Takooshian as Familiar Stranger

== Production ==
Although director Michael Almereyda was aware of Milgram's work, it wasn't until his girlfriend began taking a class on him that Almereyda became interested. Subsequently, he found himself reading Milgram's Obedience to Authority: An Experimental View. According to Almereyda once he started reading "[he] instantly saw how filmable it was" becoming increasingly interested in making it into a film the more he went on. In filming, Almereyda wanted it to be "playful" in nature as he felt that's how Stanley Milgram himself would have made it.

Almereyda decided to have Milgram break the fourth wall based on viewing films of his in which Milgram would talk to the camera, reminding him of Rod Serling or Alfred Hitchcock. From this Almereyda figured having the character talk to the camera "seemed natural and in fact essential to include that in the movie." On May 13, 2014, Peter Sarsgaard and Winona Ryder joined the cast. On June 30, Kellan Lutz, Taryn Manning, Anton Yelchin, Anthony Edwards, and Edoardo Ballerini joined the cast. Principal photography began on June 5, 2014, in New York City.

== Release ==
The film premiered at the Sundance Film Festival on January 25, 2015. On March 26, 2015, Magnolia Pictures acquired distribution rights to the film. The film was released on October 16, 2015, in a limited release and through video on demand.

== Reception ==
On the review aggregator website Rotten Tomatoes, 85% of 82 critics' reviews are positive. The website's consensus reads: "Led by a gripping performance from Peter Sarsgaard, Experimenter uses a fact-based story to pose thought-provoking questions about human nature." Metacritic, which uses a weighted average, assigned the film a score of 81 out of 100, based on 20 critics, indicating "universal acclaim".

== See also ==
- The Tenth Level
