= Xuxa Gêmeas =

2006 film directed by Jorge Fernando

- Theatrical release poster
- Directed by: Jorge Fernando
- Written by: Jorge Fernando; Patricia Travasso; Flávio de Souza
- Produced by: Diler Trindade
- Starring: Xuxa Meneghel; Ivete Sangalo; Murilo Rosa; Maria Clara Gueiros; Maria Mariana Azevedo; Eike Duarte; Ary Fontoura
- Cinematography: Edgar Moura
- Music by: Ary Sperling
- Production companies: Xuxa Produções; Diler & Associados; Globo Filmes; Warner Bros. Pictures; 20th Century Fox
- Distributed by: Fox Film do Brasil
- Release date: December 15, 2006
- Running time: 90 minutes
- Country: Brazil
- Language: Portuguese
- Budget: R$ 5 million
- Box office: R$ 5.8 million

Xuxa Gêmeas (English: Xuxa Twins) is a 2006 Brazilian romantic comedy children's film written by Flávio de Souza, Jorge Fernando and Patricia Travasso, directed by Fernando, produced by Globo Filmes, Diler & Associados, Warner Bros. Pictures and Xuxa Produçoes and distributed by 20th Century Fox and Warner Bros. Pictures. This is the last Xuxa film to be produced by Diler Trindade. Starring the Xuxa Meneghel with the participation of Ivete Sangalo, Murilo Rosa, Maria Clara Gueiros, Maria Mariana Azevedo, Eike Duarte, Ary Fontoura, Fabiana Karla, Thiago Martins.

In the film, Xuxa serves as the twin identical sisters who were separated when they were still babies. Thirty years later, Elizabeth (Xuxa) is now president of the father's graphic arts empire, while her twin sister, Mel (Xuxa) runs a performing art school involved with a Favela. Of course, their lives intersect when the wicked Elizabeth suspends the company's sponsorship of the school of Mel, who nevertheless does not give up fighting. To complicate the plot there is a diamond that by mistake, falls into the hands of Mel.

Still in 1989, Xuxa Meneghel Started working on a screenplay for a movie that would tell the story of two twin sisters and would be released in Mexico. The feature film would be signed by George Lucas, a budgeted co-production of $1.2 million that did not occur due to international commitments of Xuxa at the time. In 2006 Xuxa returned with a film project with similar script.

Gemeas showed a good performance at the box office, compared to the previous, with more than 1,007,490 box office, being the last film of Xuxa with more than 1 million viewers. He obtained a gross excess of 5,801,734 reais.

== Plot ==
A family receives two gifts on the same day: twin children. One of them, smart, crawls out of the parental car and stops inside a trailer. Created by circus artists and far from the biological family, Mel (Xuxa Meneghel) is a girl who does everything for the good and the children. But her sister Elizabeth is the opposite.

Elizabeth (Xuxa Meneghel) inherited a graphic empire from her parents. Rich and evil, she knows her sister by accident. It all starts when the company she runs cuts off the sponsorship of the school where Mel works. On top of that, a precious gem falls into Mel's hands, creating a quarrel between her and the twin. There is still time for passions among so many confusions.

== Cast ==
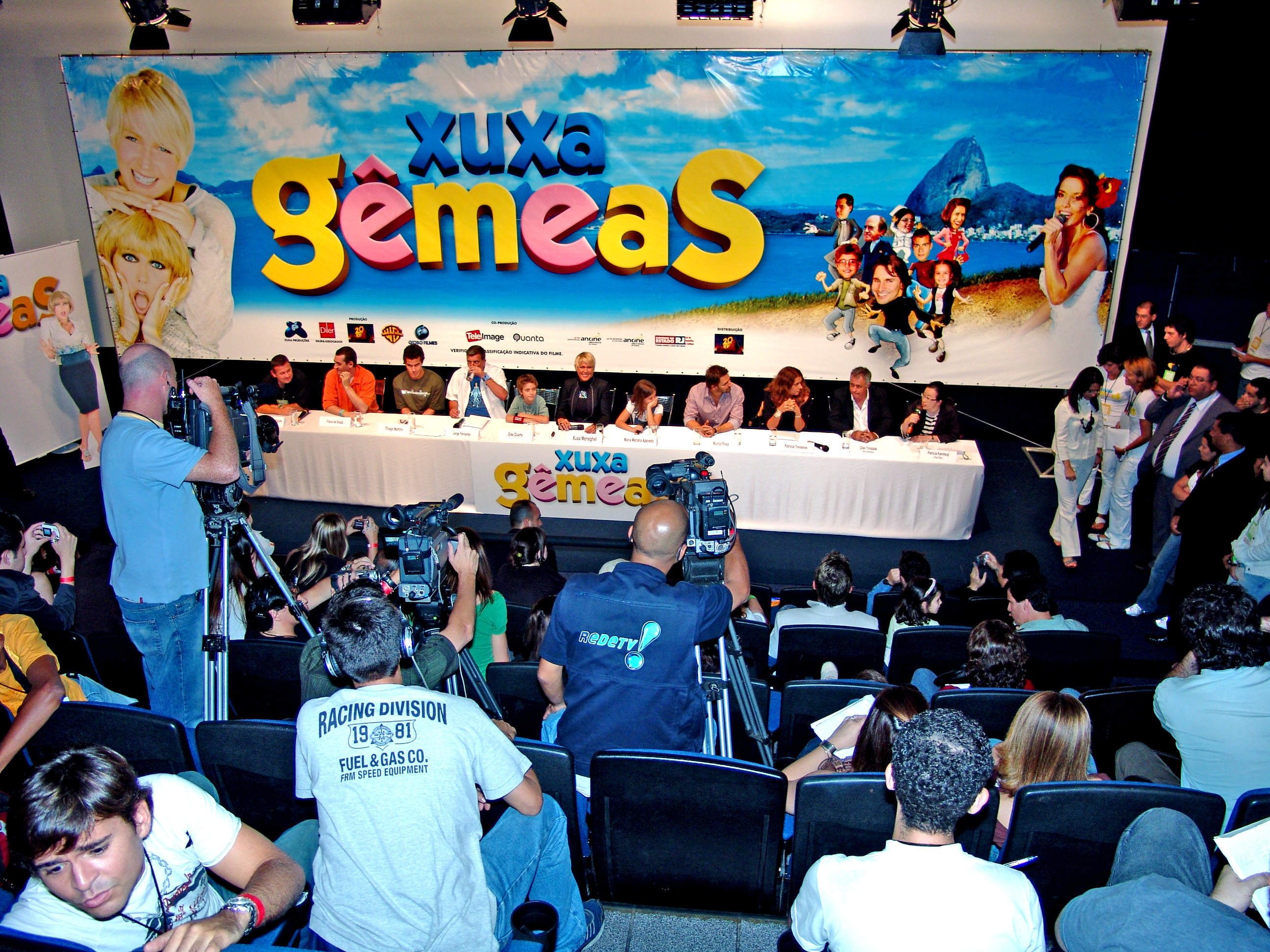
Press conference of the film Xuxa Gêmeas.

- Xuxa Meneghel as Elizabeth Dourado / Mel Monthiel (Margareth Dourado)
- Murilo Rosa as Ivan
- Ivete Sangalo as Alice / herself
- Maria Clara Gueiros as Jennifer Smith McCartney da Silva
- Maria Mariana Azevedo as Poodle
- Eike Duarte as Byte
- Luís Salém as butler
- Fabiana Karla as nurse practitioner
- Thiago Martins as Tigre
- Ary Fontoura as dr. Julio César Dourado
- Leandro Hassum as Zé Mané
- John Klarner as Juquinha1
- Marcius Melhem as Manézinho
- Márcia Cabrita as Diana
- Emiliano Queiroz as Mr. Constantino
- Patricia Travassos as receptionist
- Beto Carrero as himself
- Jorge Fernando as master of ceremonies
- Jorge de Sá as clown-mór
- Elizângela as aunt

== Production ==
=== Background ===
In December 1990, Xuxa reached its peak. In Brazil, Xuxa had, in the history of the Brazilian cinema, with the successful commercial performance of Lua de Cristal (1989), a double success: musical and cinematographic. Internationally, after the success of his first Spanish-language album Xuxa 1 (1989), Xuxa was about to take another bold step: the launch of his TV Show, in the same vein as Xou da Xuxa, in Spanish. With so many good moments, it was time to also dare in the movies. Xuxa, was planning a vacation for her TV show in early 1991, during which time she was planning to release a film outside Brazil. With script that would tell the story of two Twin sisters. Diler Trindade's expectation was that the film would be seen by an audience similar to that of Lua de Cristal in Brazil and 8 million people in Mexico. The feature film would be signed by George Lucas, who would use a technology created by his company at the time, Industrial Light & Magic, to make the twins interact. In June 1991 she would be participating in the filming of the movie that would be titled "Twins," a co-production of Xuxa Productions/Dreamvision and Columbia Pictures, budgeted at $ 1.2 million (about Cr $ million, by parallel exchange). In the cast, the Mexican singer Emmanuel and another Brazilian actor, who has not yet been chosen. Brazilian singer Fábio Júnior was invited but refused because he could not reconcile filming with the preparation of his album at the time. Another name considered was the Brazilian actor Maurício Mattar. However, because Xuxa is devoting himself to his television series El Show de Xuxa and Xuxa Park (in Argentina and Spain respectively), the project has been postponed.

=== Development ===
2006 was a year of celebration in Xuxa's career. Completing 20 years on Globo TV, For this, the project to make a film with "two Xuxas" was resumed, but this time, without the international character. On May 4, 2006, Xuxa went to TV show Domingão do Faustão to relanse several projects: the DVD "Xuxa, o Show ao Vivo" and the project of the movie Gêmeas. The TV hosts reported that there would be a contest, designed by Jayme Praça, director of Domingão, and by the production of Xuxa, to choose a lookalike of the artist. The candidates needed to be between 18 and 35 years old and the winner would have the intention of assisting the filming, especially in the scenes in which the twin sisters counter. Subsequently, while the inscriptions were open, the contest was publicized daily by TV Xuxa and Xuxa's Sunday column in the newspaper EXTRA. The contest was held on August 27, 2006, and the winner was the tourist Isabele Fintelman. With a budget of R$5.2 million reais, Gêmeas came from a questioning of the director Jorge Fernando "What I would propose different Xuxa?, What she never did? A villain. How to reconcile Xuxa image with the a villain? The twins have appeared" he explains. Xuxa's advisory adds - Jorge is making the star represent and this is unheard of for her. Xuxa commented on the challenge of interpreting an antagonist:

In all the characters I did, I was told, 'I lend you something for her', it was easier [to act], but [in 'Twins'] I had nothing to lend to Elisabeth. She's a turkey, hut. How was he going to get something for someone who wants to kill a family member because of money? I wanted to leave on the first day of recording.

In order to play the character Elizabeth, Xuxa had to do a laboratory, to better compose the character, something she had never done for any of her previous films "I panicked. The first time I went to Elizabeth, I did not know how to act. Where to put your hand, how to speak. Making Mel, who is the good sister, was easy. I did not have to change anything. I lent my things to Mel and assumed things that were hers in a natural exchange. Already the costumes of Elizabeth ... Nothing, from there, was enough for me. I had to do the stump, wear fake nails, speak in a voice that was not mine. I suffered a lot." The director says he was satisfied with the playfulness of the protagonist on the big screen, but she does not keep good memories of the work. "I, who did not even know how to play a right role, made two. It was difficult." Patrícia Travassos, who co-wrote the film with Flávio de Souza, says that The Devil Wears Prada (2006) was a reference to creating Elizabeth. Patricia had not seen the film until that date, She had actually read the book and thought there were elements common among the Elizabeth character, as owner of the graphic empire El Dourado, and the character Miranda of The Devil Wears Prada. Xuxa commented that the intention of the film is to convey positive messages to the public "It is a comedy for all kinds of people, age and social class. A movie that speaks of love and tries to convey that money is not responsible for bringing happiness." Another subject covered in the plot is the community of Morro Tavares Bastos, in Rio, where the project Stars of Tomorrow is developed - young people who use music to express their ideas. "The interesting thing is that the film shows the favela on its positive side, not the stereotype that society is accustomed to seeing on TV: the dirty and marginal boy, "adds the actor Thiago Martins, who plays Tigre. Murilo Rosa, lives the magician Ivan, love interest of Xuxa in the film: "She is incredible! We understood each other very well, I think the chemistry worked. It was 28 days of lots of fun and learning. I am very happy to be part of this film dedicated to children." The production also includes comedians such as Leandro Hassum (Zé Mané), Marcius Melhem (Manézinho), Fabiana Karla (nurse practitioner) and Maria Clara Gueiros (Jennifer) - veteran actors Ary Fontoura, Emiliano Queiroz and the young actors Eike Duarte (Byte) and Maria Mariana Azevedo (Poodle). The singer Ivete Sangalo - who makes her debut in the movies - joins the cast as Alice, Mel's great friend.

=== Filming ===
Filming took place in September 2006. The first scenes of Xuxa were filmed on September 10, 2006, in the graphic park of the newspaper O Globo, which simulates the headquarters of the fictional newspaper "O Dourado". Another location was a favela in Rio de Janeiro called Tavares Bastos. All scenes involving the favela, from different moments of the film, were filmed throughout September 19, 2006. Due to the intense work, both Xuxa and Ivete Sangalo did not speak to the press on the day. Many favela residents crowded around to see the artists. Also scenes were filmed in the circus of Beto Carrero World and in the Museu do Primeiro Reinado (some locations of the museum were used to serve as mansion of the Dourado family).

=== Music ===
The soundtrack only contains two songs: Solidão, sung by Xuxa interpreting its two characters of the film, and Coisas Maravilhosas, sung by Ivete Sangalo at the end of the movie. The instrumental tracks were composed by Ary Sperling.

== Release ==
Xuxa Gêmeas had two pre-releases. One in São Paulo, on December 9 at Shopping Jardim Sul; and another in Rio de Janeiro, on December 13, at the UCI cinema in Barra. The film debuted on December 15, 2006, in 300 theaters in Brazil.

=== Home media ===
Xuxa Gêmeas took almost a year to be released on DVD. Only from November 21, 2007, the DVD was put on sale for retail. For the rental companies the wait was a little lower, about 4 months before. The DVD brought as a gift an adult passport to the Xuxa World Park, which operated in São Paulo.

== Reception ==
=== Critical response ===
The screened audience of Filmow gave the film a rating of 1.6, based on more than 1,522 votes. The screened audience of Filmow gave the film a rating of 1.6, based on more than 1,522 votes. The website's audience from AdoroCinema, gave three stars of five, with a note of 3.1 points to the film. The IMDb audience general gave the film a rating of 1.5 points and a star.

One critic of the Cineclick site gave the film a star and a half-five, criticizing the film's script for the film writing that it "brings nothing new. It is predictable, shameful most of the time and of course educational messages." In addition, the production bets on singer Ivete Sangalo as actress. Which, believe me, is not the worst." However he praised the performance of actress Maria Clara Gueiros, writing that "she is the funniest (or rather the only one who can make her laugh) character as Elizabeth's secretary, Jennifer." He also praised Xuxa's performance by writing that "it is the production that most demands of Xuxa in the sense of interpretation, which does not fail to disappoint." and praised TV Hots for abandoning the production of fanciful films, "There are no Viking goddesses or Duendes, which makes production more tolerable." Destiny is in charge of all the magic in Xuxa Gêmeas and, among so many evils, it is necessary to see something positive in this production". Andy Malafaya writing for CINEMAPLAYERS, also criticized the film, writing that "Watching a Xuxa is already displeasing the big ones, imagine two!", He also criticized the way that the Favelas of Rio de Janeiro are portrayed in the film "Hunger, misery, traffickers? This does not exist in the fantasy world of Xuxa. After all, even Ivete Sangalo (oops, Alice) lives there. Does the blonde want Brazilian children to believe that the favela is the best place in the world to live? After all, they all live singing, dancing, stuffing themselves with honey-filled breads! Too bad that no company was smart enough to do merchandising, as is usual. It is sad to see the distortion of reality, more so from someone who should be educating." The performances were also hard criticized by the critic writing "The performances are below the acceptable level - after all, what to expect from singers, models and comedians of the fifth category ?." However, he praised the performance Xuxa, writing that she "plays the role of the good-hearted young lady - herself, obviously - and when the shrew enters the scene, the only word that comes to mind is embarrassment." Giving the film a zero rating. Writing for Cinema com Rapadura, Amanda Pontes gave 3 to the film, not recommending it to her voters, writing "If you've ever watched any of the classic "Xuxa films" you will not be surprised by this new production, which follows all the molds of the previous ones. "Xuxa Gêmeas" comes with all the expected faults, which ends up classifying it as an authentic copy of the trash". Writing to the same site, Diego Benevides, he was also critical of Xuxa's new cinematographic production, writing that Gemeas sounds "pathetic, totally badly finished and disposable as ever. It might even bring some fun to the kids, we just have to wonder if they can be fooled with so little. Giving one note to the movie.

Filmog, considered the film one of the worst of Xuxa, defining the direction of Jorge Fernando "crazy and fussy." He wrote that the movie is "an old plot, with weak characters and even stupid." She is double in that movie, one moment you see the sound and sweet Mel, in the other, the caricature and evil Elisabeth." A reviewer at Cineweb wrote that "Xuxa Meneghel's fans who were disappointed that she appeared little in last year's animation, Xuxinha e Guto contra os Monstros do Espaço (2005), can celebrate. In her new film, the former model returns in double dose." and that Xuxa "tries to reward the absence in the previous long and to call again part of the public that left her. Like the twins of the soap opera Mulheres de Areia, Xuxa is a bad sister and another good one." Marcelo Forlani writing Omelette, wrote that "that worse than a Xuxa, only: TWO XUXAS!. Noting one to the film. Laura Mattos of Folha, considered Gemeas a breakthrough in Xuxa's film career, writing that she finally abandoned the garbage fables ("Elves", "Abracadabra") that wanted to glue the actress to the fairy image.

=== Box office ===
According to data from the National Film Agency, Xuxa Gêmeas had a final box office of 1,007,490 viewers, which at the time was the lowest among the films that starred Xuxa - not considering Xuxinha e Guto contra os Monstros do Espaço (2005), which had 596,218 spectators. Despite the lower-than-expected box office, Xuxa defeated its national competitor, The Knight Didi and Princess Lili released at the same time as Gemeas, Renato Aragão's movie had 742,340 box office. Still, Xuxa Gêmeas is the second highest grossing national film in 2007, losing to A Grande Família - The Movie, seen by 2 million Brazilians. The film grossed 5,801,734 reais.

== See also ==
- List of Brazilian films of 2006
