= The Tenth Level =

- Genre: Drama
- Written by: George Bellak
- Directed by: Charles S. Dubin
- Starring: William Shatner; Ossie Davis; Lynn Carlin; Estelle Parsons; Stephen Macht; Lindsay Crouse; John Travolta
- Music by: Charles Gross
- Country of origin: United States
- Original language: English

Production
- Executive producer: Bob Markell
- Producer: Tony Masucci
- Production locations: CBS Broadcast Center, Manhattan, New York City, New York
- Editors: George Hartman; Henry Weiland
- Running time: 94 min
- Production company: CBS
- Budget: $300,000

Original release
- Network: CBS
- Release: August 26, 1976

The Tenth Level is a 1976 American made-for-television drama film movie, inspired by the Milgram experiment and starring William Shatner. It presents a social psychology professor's study to determine why people, such as the Nazis, were willing to "just follow orders" and do horrible things to others. Professor Stephen Turner (based on Stanley Milgram and played by Shatner) leads students to believe that they are applying increasingly painful electric shocks to other subjects when they fail to perform a task correctly, and is alarmed to see how much pain the students can be convinced to inflict "in the name of science".

The movie's title derives from its fictionalized representation of the Milgram experiment, which is shown as having 25 levels of voltage and pain. The tenth level is shown as the point at which the actual test subject first hears the false test subject cry out in pain.

The movie was the TV debut of Stephen Macht and Lindsay Crouse, and features an uncredited appearance by John Travolta as a student.

== Plot ==
The movie fictionalized Milgram as academic psychologist Stephen Turner, a somewhat quiet man consumed with Nazi concentration camp imagery. He was portrayed by William Shatner. Because the fictional Turner was not Jewish (as Milgram was) but a “WASP", this obsession was pathological, a reflection of guilt and a need for martyrdom, according to Turner's friend Ben, a black psychologist played by Ossie Davis.

With horror-movie music in the background, the movie showed Turner's experiments going forward, particularly emphasizing the intense nervous reactions of subjects, but did not let viewers themselves know that the "learner" was not being shocked until the play was more than half over, thus emphasizing the film's portrait of the psychologist as crazy.

Turner was subjected to an ethical inquiry after one subject, Barry, a student who had served in the army during Vietnam, had a breakdown during the experiment and destroyed the equipment. Many of the subjects that viewers had seen breaking down earlier during the trials testified to the value of the experiment, including Barry. “Had I been over there in My Lai, I would have shot dogs, cats, women, children, old men, babies. I would have wasted them all," he told the ethics board. "I’m grateful to Dr. Turner, ‘cause you see I know what is inside of me."

The last scene of the movie focused on a confrontation between Turner and his former lover, another psychologist on faculty, who demanded that he see the comparison between himself and his subjects: “You’ve been tested like your subjects. You had a choice, you could have stopped. Your ends, which were knowledge, for that you knowingly inflicted pain." The film ended with Turner sobbing on her shoulder.

== Production ==
According to writer George Bellack, when he first presented the idea of The Tenth Level to a group of TV executives, many were outraged by the idea. The president of ABC called it "godless" but it was ultimately shown in prime time on Playhouse 90. Although scheduled for showing in the Christmas season of 1975, the drama did not air until August 26, 1976, because it took that long to assemble a critical mass of sponsors. Major sponsors like IBM, Xerox. AT&T and General Motors refused to sponsor it.

Shatner gave up his divorce rights to see his children on Christmas Day to film the program.

Milgram was paid $5,000 as a consultant on the film. He had very little input in the film. He felt the movie was dull, with the "genuine drama underlying the obedience problem getting lost in the welter of video cliches".

The Tenth Level was shot directly on videotape at the CBS Broadcast Center in New York City and on location at Yale University where the original Milgram experiments had taken place, and presented as a teleplay reminiscent of the "Golden Age of Television".

The film has never been released on video or DVD.

== Awards ==
- The movie received honorable mention at American Psychological Association's National Media Awards in 1977.

== See also ==
- Dannie Abse's play, The Dogs of Pavlov
- Experimenter (film)
