= Juliana Paes =

Brazilian actress and model (born 1979)

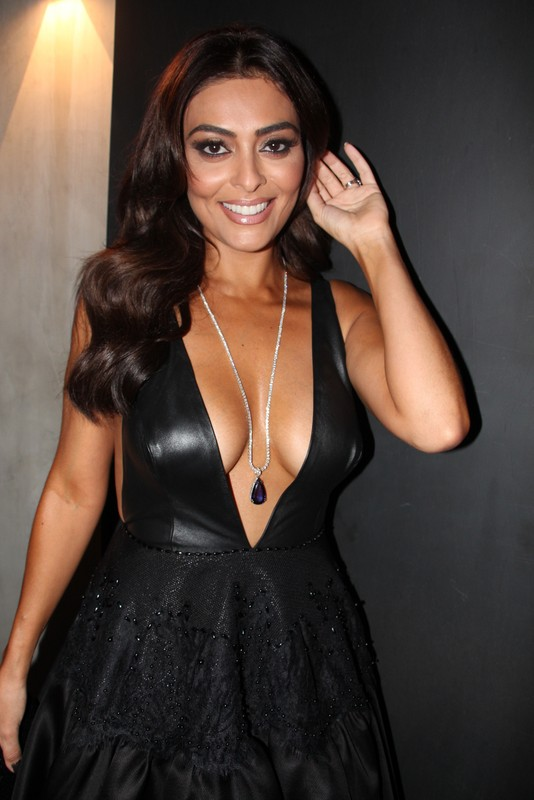
- Paes in 2015
- Born: Juliana Couto Paes; 26 March 1979 (age 47); Rio Bonito, Rio de Janeiro, Brazil
- Education: Higher School of Advertising and Marketing
- Occupation: Actress
- Years active: 2000–present
- Height: 1.70 m (5 ft 7 in)
- Spouse: Carlos Eduardo Baptista (m. 2008)
- Children: 2
- Website: julianapaes.com.br

Juliana Couto Paes (born 26 March 1979) is a Brazilian actress and former model. She became nationally known in telenovelas and modelling. She also starred in a local version of the musical The Producers, as Ulla.

== Career ==
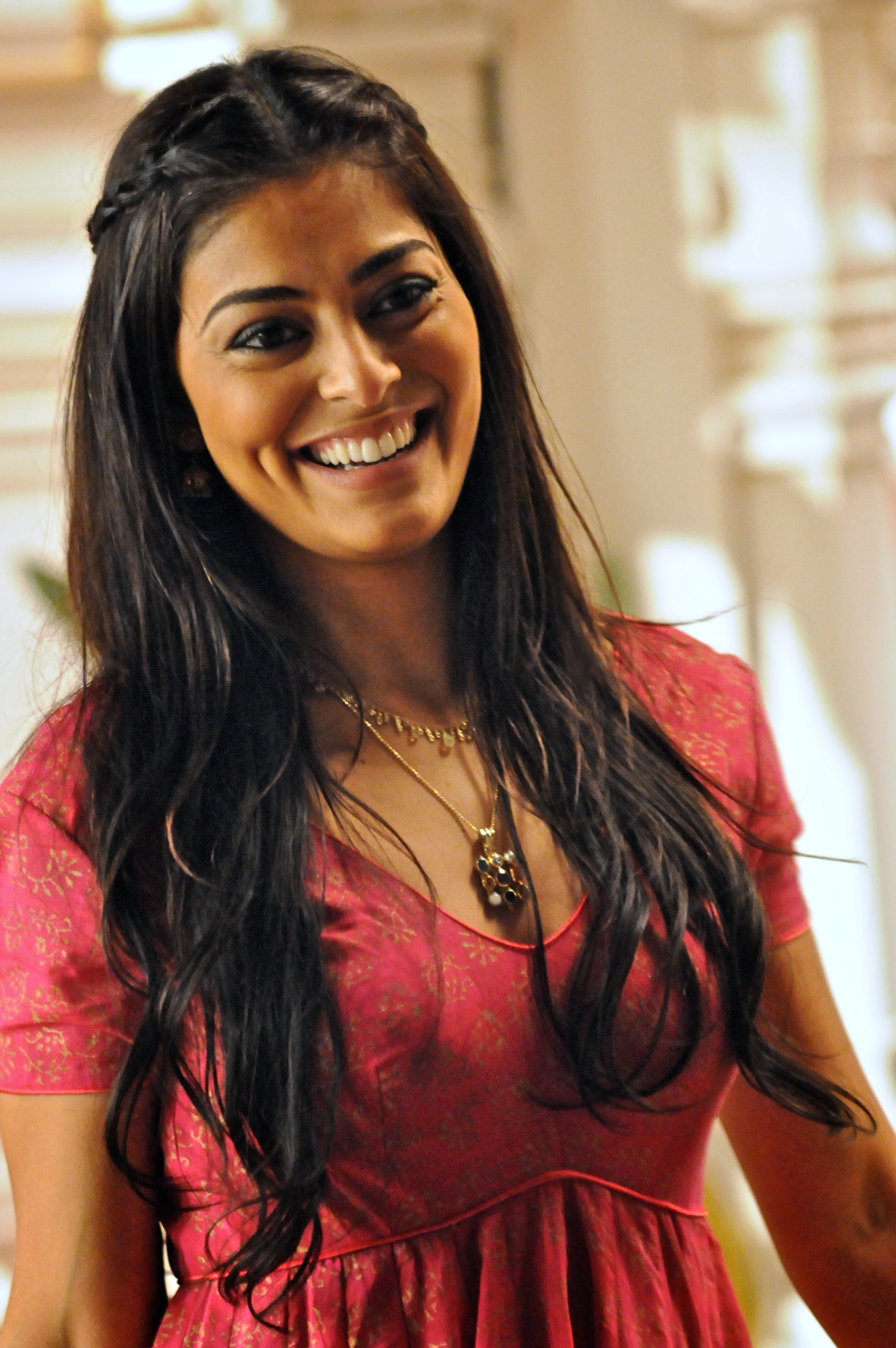
Juliana as Maya Meetha, the protagonist of Caminho das Índias.

An actress, model and with a university degree, Paes became nationally known for her performances in "soap operas" of Rede Globo and for her looks. She was on the cover of Playboy magazine in May 2004.

She has Arab, Indigenous, African, Spanish, and Portuguese ancestry.

In 2006, Paes was voted one of the sexiest one hundred people in the world by People Magazine. After that international projection, she hired an agent, showing interest in starting an acting career in the US.

Paes starred in many commercial campaigns, such as Colorama's and Hope's. Currently, she is the face of Arezzo for the second time and replaces the top model Gisele Bündchen as the star of the campaign for the jewelry brand Vivara.

Her debut as protagonist was the character Maya Meetha in the Brazilian telenovela Caminho das Índias

In 2009, she entered the select group of protagonists of the novel of the eight of Rede Globo when interpreting Maya, in Caminho das Índias, novel of Glória Perez winner of Emmy 2009. The actress starred in several advertising campaigns including Colorama and Hope. It was the advertising girl of the brand Arezzo and the jewelry brand Vivara. It was considered by Revista Época one of the 100 most influential Brazilians of the year 2009. On September 24, 2010, Juliana Paes debuted the program Por un fio at GNT. After the birth of her first child, Juliana returned to television in September 2011 in a guest appearance on the remake of the novel O Astro (2011 TV series).

In 2012, she starred in the episode "The Justice of Olinda" in the series As Brasileiras by Daniel Filho, playing Janaína, as well as the protagonist of the remake of Gabriela (2012 TV series), written by Walcyr Carrasco winner of Emmy 2016, under Roberto Talma and Mauro Mendonça Filho winner of Emmy 2011. In 2014, before even ending maternity leave, he accepted the invitation of director Luiz Fernando Carvalho Emmy nominated (2005,2014,2016), to star in the reboot of Meu Pedacinho de Chão, by author Benedito Ruy Barbosa Emmy nominated (2006,2017). Still in 2014, presents next to Márcio Garcia new version of the Golden Globe on Canal Viva. In 2016 she played the Carolina villain, in the telenovela Totalmente Demais Emmy nominated 2017, where she lived a loving square, alongside Marina Ruy Barbosa, Fábio Assunção Emmy nominated 2011 and Felipe Simas. In the year of 2017 it resumes its partnership with Glória Perez when living Fabiana Escobar known as Bibi Perigosa, in the telenovela A Força do Querer of Rede Globo. The plot has reached high ratings, and its character has become very popular, winning many awards from the critics.

== Personal life ==
Paes was born in Rio Bonito, Rio de Janeiro. She is the oldest child of Regina Couto and Carlos Henrique Paes. She has three siblings.

On September 9, 2008, she married in total communion of assets with businessman Carlos Eduardo Baptista, at Itanhangá Golf Club, being considered the "bride of the year."

On December 16, 2010, her first son was born in the city of Rio de Janeiro. At the end of 2012, Paes announced her second pregnancy. On July 21, 2013, the couple's second child was born in the maternity ward of Barra da Tijuca.

Paes is a big football fan, and in 2011 she publicly stated that she was a Vasco da Gama fan.

== Filmography ==
=== Television ===
Year	Title	Role	Notes
1998	Malhação		Featured
2000	Laços de Família	Ritinha	
2001	Brava Gente	Rosinha	
2001	O Clone	Karla	
2002	Sítio do Picapau Amarelo	Jurema	
2003	A Casa das Sete Mulheres	Princess Teiniaguá	TV miniseries
2003	Celebridade	Jacqueline Joy	
2003	Os Normais	Marialva	
2005	América	Creusa	
2005	Levando a Vida	Grace	
2006	Pé na Jaca	Gui (Guinevere Ataliba dos Santos)	
2007	Toma Lá, Dá Cá	Suellen	
2007	Dicas de um Sedutor	Vera Lúcia	
2008	Duas Caras	Herself	1 episode
2008	A Favorita	Maíra Carvalho	
2009	Caminho das Índias	Maya Meetha	Lead role
2011	O Astro	Nina	
2012	Gabriela	Gabriela	Lead role
2012	As Brasileiras	Janaína	Episode: "A Justiceira de Olinda"
2014	Meu Pedacinho de Chão	Catarina	Lead role
2015	Totalmente Demais	Carolina	Lead role
2017	Dois Irmãos	Zana	2 episodes
2017	A Força do Querer	Fabiana Duarte Feitosa (Bibi)	Lead role
2019	A Dona do Pedaço	Maria da Paz Sobral Ramirez	Lead role
2022	Pantanal	Maria Marruá	Guest star
2024	Renascer	Jacutinga de Arrabal	Guest star
2024	Pedaço de Mim	Liana	Lead role

=== Cinema ===
- 2021 – Amor Sem Medida - Ivana
- 2013 – Casa da Mãe Joana 2 – Dolores Sol
- 2010 – Bed & Breakfast – Ana
- 2008 – Kung Fu Panda – Master Tigress (Brazilian dubbing)
- 2007 – Casa da Mãe Joana – Dolores Sol
- 2006 – Seus problemas acabaram – special guest
- 2005 – Mais uma vez amor – Lia

== Awards and nominations ==
=== Los Angeles Brazilian Film Festival ===
Year	Category	Nominated	Result	Ref.
2015	Best Actress	The Farewell	Won	

=== Gramado Film Festival ===
Year	Category	Nominated	Result	Ref.
2014	Best Actress	The Farewell	Won	

=== Paulista Association of Art Critics ===
Year	Category	Nominated	Result	Ref.
2017	Best Actress	A Força do Querer	Won	

=== Prêmio Contigo! de TV ===
Year	Category	Nominated	Result	Ref.
2006	Best Supporting Actress	América (Brazilian TV series)	Nominated	
2010	Best Actress	Caminho das Índias	Nominated	
2017	Best Actress	A Força do Querer	Won	

=== Prêmio Extra de Televisão ===
Year	Category	Nominated	Result	Ref.
2009	Best Actress	Caminho das Índias	Nominated	
2014	Best Actress	Meu Pedacinho de Chão	Nominated	
2017	Best Actress	A Força do Querer	Won	

=== Prêmio Quem de Televisão ===
Year	Category	Nominated	Result	Ref.
2012	Best Actress	Gabriela (2012 TV series)	Nominated	
2014	Best Actress	Meu Pedacinho de Chão	Nominated	

=== Internet Trophy ===
Year	Category	Nominated	Result	Ref.
2010	Best Actress	Caminho das Índias	Won	
2018	Best Actress	A Força do Querer	Won	

=== Troféu Imprensa ===
Year	Category	Nominated	Result	Ref.
2010	Best Actress	Caminho das Índias	Nominated	
2018	Best Actress	A Força do Querer	Won	

=== Melhores do Ano ===
Year	Category	Nominated	Result	Ref.
2009	Best Actress	Caminho das Índias	Nominated	
2017	Best Actress	A Força do Querer	Nominated	
2019	Best Actress	A Dona do Pedaço	Won	

=== Nickelodeon Kids' Choice Awards ===
Year	Category	Nominated	Result	Ref.
2007	Cat of the Year	Caminho das Índias	Won	

=== Quality Award Brazil ===
Year	Category	Nominated	Result	Ref.
2007	Best Actress in Theater - Musical	The Producers	Nominated	
2009	Best Actress	Caminho das Índias	Won	

=== ISTOÉ Trophy - Brazilians of the Year ===
Year	Category	Nominated	Result	Ref.
2009	Best Actress	Caminho das Índias	Won	
2017	Best Actress	A Força do Querer	Won	

=== Brazilian Society of Aesthetic Dentistry ===
Year	Category	Nominated	Result	Ref.
2016	Smile of the Year	HERSELF	Won	
