= Caminho das Índias =

Brazilian telenovela by Glória Perez

- Also known as: India: A Love Story
- Genre: Telenovela
- Created by: Glória Perez
- Written by: Glória Perez; Carlos Lombardi; Elizabeth Jhin; Leila Míccolis
- Directed by: Marcos Schechtman
- Starring: Juliana Paes; Rodrigo Lombardi; Tony Ramos; Márcio Garcia; Tania Khalill; Letícia Sabatella; Alexandre Borges; Débora Bloch; Christiane Torloni; Humberto Martins; Lima Duarte; Bruno Gagliasso; Marjorie Estiano; Cléo Pires
- Theme music composer: Vishal Bhardwaj
- Opening theme: "Beedi Jalaile" by Sunidhi Chauhan
- Countries of origin: Brazil; India
- Original languages: Portuguese; Hindi
- No. of seasons: 1
- No. of episodes: 203 (original run); 160 (international version)

Production
- Production locations: Rio de Janeiro, Brazil; New Delhi, India
- Camera setup: Multiple-camera setup
- Running time: 50–80 Minutes
- Production company: Central Globo de Produção

Original release
- Network: Rede Globo
- Release: 19 January – 11 September 2009

Caminho das Índias (lit: Path to the Indies; English title: India: A Love Story) is a Brazilian primetime telenovela produced and broadcast by TV Globo from 19 January to 11 September 2009, with 203 episodes.

Written by Glória Perez, directed by Marcos Schechtman. Starring Juliana Paes, Rodrigo Lombardi, Letícia Sabatella, Tânia Khallil, Débora Bloch, Alexandre Borges and Bruno Gagliasso.

The plot examines the differences in beliefs and values of the Eastern and Western world. Shot on locations in Brazil and India, it was Globo's first winning telenovela at the International Emmy Awards.

== Overview ==
The title can be interpreted in two ways: it is Portuguese for "Route to the Indies" (literally) or "India's Way" (figuratively). The story is set during India's transition into a modern democracy, mostly in the period of the 1990s to 2000s, with many prominent flashbacks to the 1950s and 1970s. The story is equally divided between continents, from Rio de Janeiro, Brazil, to Rajasthan, India, with some scenes in Dubai. Themes include love, reason, sanity, insanity, and tradition versus modernity. The story highlights the contrasts of values and belief systems in the West and the East, told through families, their friends, and the complex mesh of relationships which connect them.

== Plot ==
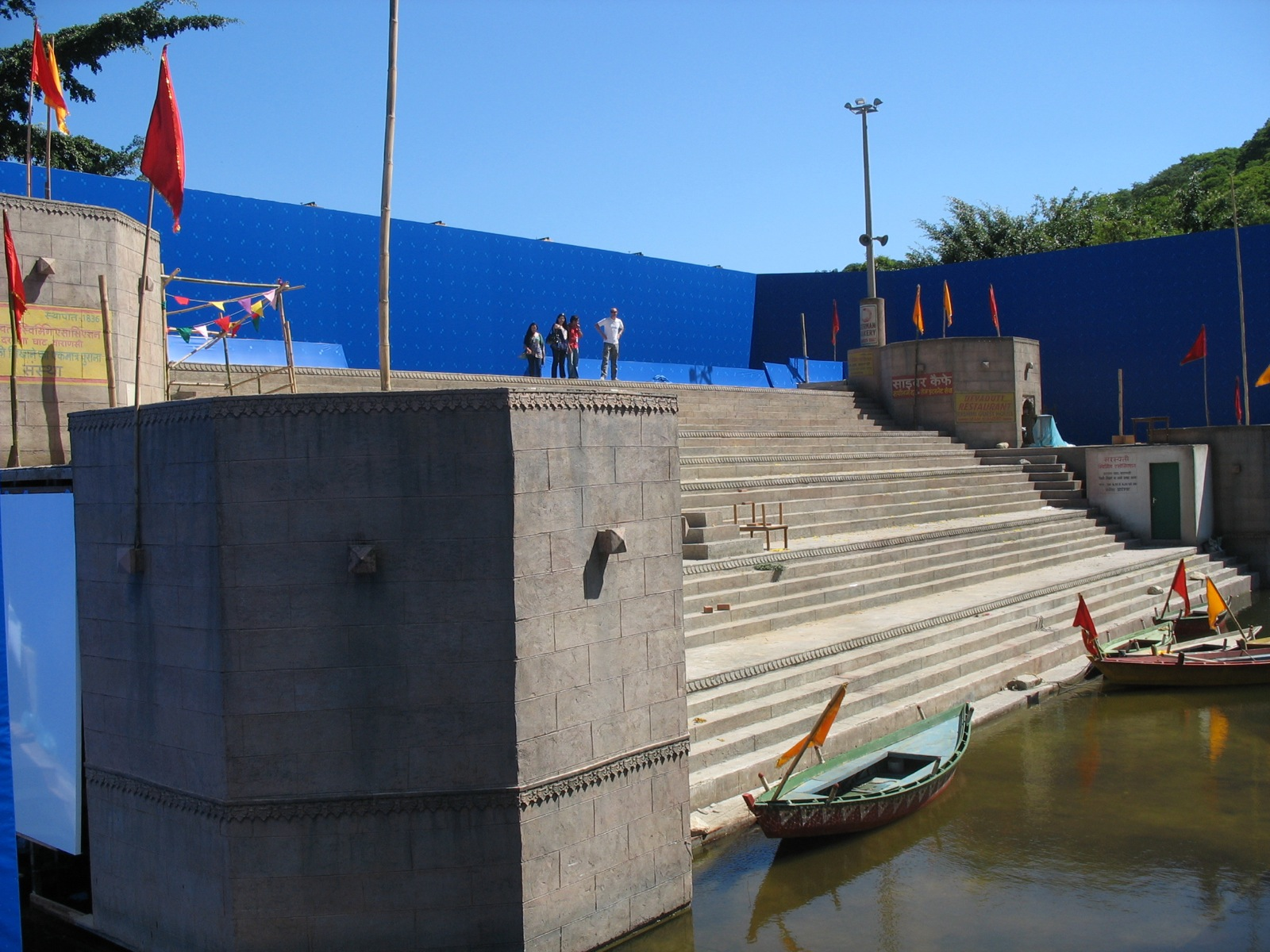
Reproduction of Ganges River to the telenovela India – A Love Story in scenographic city of Projac.

One of the main plot points is a forbidden love between castes. Maya, a charming call-centre employee in Rajasthan, comes from the Vaishya trader caste. While her parents try to arrange a marriage for her, she falls in love with Bahuan, which she declares to her parents. She does not understand Bahuan's misgivings until learning that he is the orphaned son of Dalit (untouchable) servants who were burned at the stake for accidentally touching their master's shadow. They plan a future together while her parents arrange a marriage to Raj Ananda, and Bahuan works toward his career, eventually becoming a partner in a Brazilian company.

Meanwhile, Raj falls in love with Brazilian Duda, who initially fights for Raj's affections but the cultural conflicts exhaust and disillusion her, and she turns away from Raj for a new love. Ravi then falls in love with a Brazilian woman, Camilla. As she tries to adapt to Hindu culture, she provokes conflict in the Ananda family of tradespeople, as Raj's younger sister Shanti aspires to become educated and eschews the traditional roles for women favoured by her mother. Ravi and Camilla eventually marry.

== Production ==
=== Locations ===
Artistic and general director Marcos Schechtman and director Fred Mayrink traveled to India to write the telenovela's first scenes, which began filming on 1 October 2008 in the cities of Jaipur and Agra. In addition to 40 people from the Brazilian team, the telenovela had partnered with a local producer. The modern architecture of Dubai, in the United Arab Emirates, also served as filming locations for the show at the end of October.

=== Sets and art direction ===
In order to recreate the environment for the story, three-city sets were constructed at Projac in Rio de Janeiro, totalling 11,500 square metres (123,785 sq ft). One of these sets imitates the typical architecture of the Lapa neighborhood in Rio de Janeiro, Brazil, while the other two attempt to recreate features of the Indian state of Rajasthan.

Indian culture and architecture are represented in the telenovela (top). Cléo Pires wearing a sari (bottom).

Using the cities of Jaipur, Jodhpur and Mumbai as references, the art director built 42 shops and a temple of Shiva, in addition to the street façade for a movie theater, and terracota-colored households of the four main Indian families of the story. One of the margins of the Ganges was also reproduced, through an artificial lake built near the entrance of the studio complex.

The art production team, led by Mario Monteiro, attempted to reproduce an Indian universe on camera. The Indian core of the telenovela received a very colorful ambiance, with Hindi inscriptions, in comparison to the clean aesthetics of the Brazilian scenarios. The sets were dressed with Indian items which were purchased or reproduced, and vehicles used in India were built by the team to fill the street of the artificial city.

The wardrobe was also carefully studied by Emilia Duncan. Women's traditional clothes, such as the sari were recreated, although with a bit of poetic license, thus bringing some clothing usually used in rituals for the everyday wearing.

== Cast ==
Actor	Character
Juliana Paes	Maya Meetha
Rodrigo Lombardi	Raj Ananda
Letícia Sabatella	Yvone Oliveira Magalhães
Tony Ramos	Opash Ananda
Alexandre Borges	Raul Cadore
Débora Bloch	Sílvia Cadore
Tânia Khallil	Maria Eduarda de Moraes (a.k.a. Duda)
Márcio Garcia	Bahuan Sundrani
Bruno Gagliasso	Tarso Cadore
Marjorie Estiano	Tônia Cavinato
Humberto Martins	Ramiro Cadore
Christiane Torloni	Melissa Cadore
Caco Ciocler	Murilo Cavinato
Dira Paes	Norma Cristina Almeida (a.k.a. Norminha)
Anderson Müller	Abel Almeida
Isis Valverde	Camila Motta Goulart Ananda
Caio Blat	Ravi Ananda
Cléo Pires	Surya Ananda
Thaila Ayala	Shivani Mugdaliar Sundrani
Odilon Wagner	Michael Brown Johnson (a.k.a. Maike, Eric Brown)
Totia Meireles	Dr. Aída Motta
Antônio Calloni	César Gallo Goulart
Ana Beatriz Nogueira	Ilana Gallo Goulart
André Gonçalves	Mutineja Gopal (a.k.a. Gopal)
Betty Gofman	Dayse
Neusa Borges	Iracema (a.k.a. Cema)
Danton Mello	Amithab Ananda
Juliana Alves	Suellen
André Arteche	Indra
Maria Maya	Inês Cadore
Júlia Almeida	Léa Motta Goulart (a.k.a. Leinha)
Ricardo Tozzi	Komal Meetha
Paula Pereira	Durga
Rosane Gofman	Walkíria (a.k.a. Wal)
Victor Fasano	Dario
Cissa Guimarães	Ruth
Sílvia Buarque	Berenice (a.k.a. Berê)
Duda Nagle	José Carlos Gallo Goulart (a.k.a. Zeca)
Carolina Oliveira	Chanti Ananda
Ana Furtado	Dr. Gabriela (a.k.a. Gabi)
Blota Filho	Haroldo Estevanato
Luci Pereira	Ondina
Marcelo Brou	Guto
Mara Manzan	Dona Ashima
Thais Garayp	Ana
Mussunzinho	Maico
Priscila Marinho	Sheila
Marcius Melhem	Radesh
Cacau Mello	Deva
Ana Lima	Dr. Cecília (a.k.a. Ciça)
Darlan Cunha	Eliseu
Cláudia Lira	Nayana
Clarice Derzie Luz	Harima
Adilson Magha	Siro
Janaina Prado	Sonya
Luiz Baccelli	Barat Mugdaliar
Jacqueline Dalabona	Rhada Mugdaliar
Allan Souza Lima	Hadit
Alexandre Liuzzi	Pedro

Children
Actor	Character
Karina Ferrari	Anusha Ananda
Cadu Paschoal	Hari Hitid
Laura Barreto	Lalit
Nahuana Costa	Malika

Introducing
Actor	Character
Sidney Santiago	Ademir
Brendha Haddad	Rani Meetha
Vitória Frate	Júlia Cadore
Márcio Vito	Ramu Hitid

Special guest stars
Actor	Character
Vera Fischer	Chiara
Eva Todor	Cidinha
Elias Gleizer	Senhor Cadore
Murilo Rosa	Lucas Garrido
Maitê Proença	Fernanda Estevanato (a.k.a. Nanda)
Guilherme Zaiden	as himself (cameo)

Invited Actresses

Actor	Character
Laura Cardoso	Laksmi Ananda
Jandira Martini	Puja Hitid
Eliane Giardini	Indira Ananda
Nívea Maria	Kochi Meetha

Invited actors
Actor	Character
Osmar Prado	Manu Meetha
José de Abreu	Sacerdote Pandit
Flávio Migliaccio	Karan Ananda

And
Lima Duarte as "Shankar Sundrani"
Stênio Garcia as "Dr. Castanho"
Tony Ramos as "Opash Ananda"

== Soundtrack ==
=== Caminho das Índias vol. 1, National ===
Cover: Juliana Paes

1. Beedi – Sukhwinder Singh & Sunidhi Chauhan (opening theme)
2. Eu Nasci Há Dez Mil Anos Atrás – Nando Reis (India's location theme)
3. Pára-Raio – Skank (Murilo's theme)
4. Uma Prova De Amor – Zeca Pagodinho (Castanho and Suellen's theme)
5. Vamos Fugir (Gimme Your Love) – Gilberto Gil (Tarso and Tônia's theme)
6. Ela Disse – Marcelo D2 (Júlia's theme)
7. Memórias – Pitty (Inês theme)
8. Martelo Bigorna – Lenine (Yvone's theme)
9. Nada Por Mim – Paula Toller (Camila's theme)
10. Alma – Zélia Duncan (Melissa and Ramiro's theme)
11. Sob Medida – Isabella Taviani
12. Lembra De Mim – Emílio Santiago (Sílvia's theme)
13. Amor, Meu Grande Amor – Ângela Rô Rô (Chiara and Murilo's theme)
14. Não Se Esqueça De Mim – Nana Caymmi & Erasmo Carlos (Maya and Bahuan's theme)
15. Feliz – Gonzaguinha (Raj and Duda's theme)
16. O Vento Vai Responder (Blowin' in the Wind) – Zé Ramalho (Dayse's theme)
17. Dois pra lá, dois pra cá – Elis Regina (Rio de Janeiro's location theme)
18. Até Quem Sabe – Nara Leão (Raul's theme)
19. Sufoco da Vida – Harmonia Enlouquece
20. Você Não Vale Nada – Calcinha Preta (Norminha's theme)

=== Caminho das Índias vol. 2, Indian ===
1. Beedi Jalaile – Sunidhi Chauhan, Sukhwinder Singh, Nachiketa Chakraborty and Clinton Cerejo (opening theme)
2. Kajra Re – Alisha Chinai, Shankar Mahadevan and Javed Ali
3. Nagada Nagada – Sonu Nigam and Javed Ali
4. Sajna Ve Sajna – Sunidhi Chauhan
5. Main Vari Vari – Kavita Krishnamurti and Reena Bhardwaj (theme of Maya and Bahuan)
6. Mast Kalandar – Sunidhi Chauhan
7. Chori Chori Hum Gori Se – Abhijeet and Udit Narayan
8. Salaam-E-Ishq – Sonu Nigam and Shreya Ghoshal
9. Salaam – Alka Yagnik
10. Azeem-O-Shaan Shahenshah – Mohammed Aslam, Javed Akhtar and Bonnie Chakraborty
11. Bangra Jaya – Alexandre de Faria

=== Caminho das Índias vol. 3, Lapa ===
Cover: Juliana Alves

1. Eu vou pra Lapa – Alcione
2. Malandro é malandro, mané é mané – Diogo Nogueira (theme of César and Ilana)
3. Só faltou você Lado a Lado B – Leandro Sapucahy
4. Vaso Ruim – Casuarina (theme of Radesh)
5. Tristeza Pé no Chão – Teresa Cristina & Grupo Semente
6. Amor de verdade – Beth Carvalho
7. Errei – Sururu na Roda (live)
8. Pretinha Jóia Rara – Moyseis Marques
9. Em Desfile Chatos – Jota Canalha
10. Sal e Pimenta – Gabriel o Pensador
11. Puro êxtase – Barão Vermelho
12. Anjo da madrugada – Babi Xavier (theme of Duda and Lucas)
13. Lourinha Bombril (Parate y mira) – Bangalafumenga
14. Legal, Vou ficar – Quatro Fatos
15. Põe aê uma música – DJ Alex Guedes
16. Uma flor uma raiz – Fino
17. Coletivo Mezcla – Riosalsa (theme of Suellen and Ademi)

=== Caminho das Índias vol. 4, International ===
1. "Halo" – Beyoncé (theme of Yvone)
2. "Thinking of You" – Katy Perry (theme of Bahuan and Shivani)
3. Orishas – Público
4. "Never Gonna Be Alone" – Nickelback (theme of Tônia and Tarso)
5. Tip of My Tongue – Something Sally feat. Joss Stone (theme of Aída and Darío)
6. Small Talk – Ovi
7. To Love you All Over Again – Madeleine Peyroux (theme of Chiara)
8. "Sober" – Pink
9. "Use Somebody" – Kings of Leon
10. Lies – McFly (theme of Zeca)
11. Madly – Tristan Prettyman (theme of Duda and Lucas)
12. Quando e se – Ari Hest (theme of Silvia and Murilo)
13. Lay Lady Lay – Dan (theme of Dr. Castanho and Suellen)
14. I'm in the Mood for Love – Daniel Boaventura (theme of Maya and Raj)
15. All the Way – Ronaldo Canto e Mello (theme of Camila and Ravi)
16. Smoke Gets in Your Eyes – Oséas (theme of Shankar y Laksm)

=== Caminho das Índias vol. 5, Instrumental ===
1. Os portais do Taj Mahal – Alexandre de Faria (General theme)
2. Tema de Maya e Bahuan – Alexandre de Faria (theme of Maya and Bahuan)
3. Quase um Intocável – Alexandre de Faria (Untouchable's theme)
4. Caminho das Índias – Alexandre de Faria (theme of general dance)
5. Nos passos de Shankar – Alexandre de Faria (theme of Shankar)
6. Meu Salaam – Alexandre de Faria (romantic theme)
7. Meditação e Karma – Alexandre de Faria (incidental theme)
8. Re Tchori – Alexandre de Faria (theme of general dance)
9. Habanera para Tarso – Alexandre de Faria (theme of Tarso)
10. Maxixe Chorado – Alexandre de Faria (theme of Lapa neighborhood)
11. Uma Canção sem Palavras – Alexandre de Faria (tema triste)
12. Tango da Ausência – Alexandre de Faria (theme of Lapa neighborhood)
13. Berceuse pour un Nuit – Alexandre de Faria (incidental theme)
14. Toda Levada – Alexandre de Faria

== Awards ==
In November 2009, Caminho das Índias was recognized as Best Telenovela in the 2009 International Emmy Awards. In Brazil, it won four awards for Best Telenovela.

The cast won several awards. Bruno Gagliasso won five awards for Best Supporting Actor. Dira Paes won four awards for Best Supporting Actress. Rodrigo Lombardi won two awards for Best Actor. Juliana Paes won one award for Best Actress.

== See also ==
- Brazil–India relations
- Caste system in India
- Culture of India
- Indian soap opera
- Masala chai
- TV Globo

Preceded by A Favorita (2008–2009)	Caminho das Índias; 19 January 2009 – 11 September 2009	Succeeded by Viver a Vida (2009–2010)
