= Marcius Melhem =

Brazilian actor, comedian and writer (born 1972)

- Born: Marcius Vinícius de Assis Melhem; February 8, 1972 (age 54); Nilópolis, RJ, Brazil
- Occupations: Actor, comedian, contributing editor, humorist, playwright
- Years active: 1993 – present
- Notable work: Os Caras de Pau

Marcius Melhem (Brazilian Portuguese: [ˈmaʁsjuz ˈmɛʎẽ]; born February 8, 1972) is a Brazilian actor, playwright, humorist, contributing editor, comedian and voice actor.

He is mostly known for his work at Rede Globo, the largest television network in Brazil. He also has worked as a writer of television programs and author of plays. In 2018, he became the head of the comedy department of Rede Globo, and was the one who wrote the most for that area.

== Biography ==
=== Education and Career ===
Melhem has a degree in journalism from the Pontifical Catholic University of Rio de Janeiro. He was a director of journalism at Agência Leia de Notícias, which produced content in real time for the domestic financial market.

One of his works on television was the comedy show Os Caras de Pau, which aired from 2010 to 2013.

In late 2019, Melhem retired from his career for "personal reasons". One of his daughters needed severe health care.

On August 14, 2020, his seventeen-year old contract with Rede Globo ended by mutual agreement. Globo thanked Melhem for the seventeen-year success.

=== Controversy ===
He has been accused of sexual assault by multiple women in an ongoing investigation. By February 2022, eight more women came forward.

== Work ==
=== Television ===
Year	Name	Role	Notes
2014	Tá no Ar: a TV na TV	Various	Actor / Writer / Producer
2013	A Grande Família	Zinho	Actor; Season 13 Episode 22
2013	Tapas & Beijos	Regino	Actor; Guest appearance
2012	As Brasileiras	-	Writer; Season 1 Episode 3
2010	Os Caras de Pau	Pedrão	Actor / Writer / Producer
2010	S.O.S. Emergência	-	Writer; Season 1 Episodes 1-13; Season 2 Episode 2
2010	A Princesa e o Vagabundo	-	Writer
2009	Caminho das Índias	Radesh	Actor; Several episodes
2008	Estação Globo	Glauber	Actor
2008	Casos e Acasos	-	Writer; Season 1 Episodes 0, 1, 3, 6-9, 12-14 and 19
2007	Casos e Acasos	-	Writer; Season 1 Episodes 0, 1, 3, 6-9, 12-14 and 19
2004	Da Cor do Pecado	Verinha's northeastern suitor	Actor; Guest appearance
2003	Sob Nova Direção	-	Actor; Season 1 Episode 0
2003	Mulheres Apaixonadas	Otávio	Actor; Guest appearance
1999	Zorra Total	Pedrão / Glauber	Actor

=== Films ===
Year	Name	Role	Notes
2014	Os Caras de Pau em: O Misterioso Roubo do Anel	Pedrão	Actor / Writer
2013	Até que a Sorte nos Separe 2	-	Actor
2013	Free Birds	-	Voice in Brazilian Portuguese version
2013	Osmar, a Primeira Fatia do Pão de Forma	Osmar	Voice
2010	Despicable Me	Vector	Voice in Brazilian Portuguese version
2006	Xuxa Gêmeas	Manezinho	Actor

=== Theater ===
Year	Name	Role	Notes
2010	Nós no Tempo	-	-
2006	Nós na Fita	-	Protagonist
2006	Enfim nós	-	-

== Awards and nominations ==
Year	Nominee / work	Award	Result
2020	-	ABRA de Roteiro	Won
2017	-	Emmy Internacional	Nominated
2016	-	Emmy Internacional	Nominated
2012	-	Melhores do Ano	Nominated
2010	-	Meus Prêmios Nick	Won
2010	-	Arte e Qualidade Brasil	Nominated
2009	-	Melhores do Ano	Nominated
2008	-	Contigo de Televisão	Nominated
2006	-	Zilka Salaberry	Won
1992	-	Mérito de Ator Revelação	Won
