= Charles Gross =

American film and television composer (1934–2026)

Charles Gross (May 13, 1934 – March 24, 2026) was an American film and television composer who lived in New York City.

== Life and career ==
Gross was born in Boston, Massachusetts on May 13, 1934. He was educated at Harvard University (BA), the New England Conservatory and Mills College (teaching fellowship), and a student of Darius Milhaud. He arranged for the West Point Band for three years, and served in the US Army. Later, he became a writer for industrial films and cartoons.

He wrote original music for the 1976 Broadway production of The Eccentricities of a Nightingale.

His film and television scores included Valdez Is Coming (1971), The Tenth Level (1976), Blue Sunshine (1977), The Dain Curse (1978), Heartland (1979), My Body, My Child (1982), Terrible Joe Moran (1984), Country (1984), The Burning Bed (1984), The Night They Saved Christmas (1984), Arthur the King (1985), Sweet Dreams (1985), Between Two Women (1986), Punchline (1988), Turner & Hooch (1989), Air America (1990), Another You (1991), A Family Thing (1996), and Fakin' Da Funk (1997).

Gross died on March 24, 2026, at the age of 91.
