= Luiza Valdetaro =

Brazilian actress and businesswoman (born 1985)

- Born: 7 September 1985 (age 40); Rio de Janeiro, Brazil
- Occupation: Actress
- Years active: 2002–2015

Luiza dos Santos Valdetaro (born September 7, 1985) is a Brazilian retired actress and businesswoman. She has lived in London since 2015, where she became a partner of the multinational producer BlueMoon and began to dedicate her career to entrepreneurship.

== Career ==
In 2002 she appeared in the first chapters of the 2002 season of Malhação as a student attending the club, until making debut in a fixed novel, with the personage Gabi, in Celebridade. After this, she participated in the novel América, interpreting Manu. In 2006, she lived her first protagonist of the teen soap opera Malhação. Also interpreted Gloria, in Viver a Vida of Manoel Carlos. In 2011 she was in the telenovela Cordel Encantado as Antônia, one of the protagonists of the plot.

In 2012 she played Gerusa Bastos, one of the protagonists of the remake of Gabriela, work of Jorge Amado adapted by Walcyr Carrasco and direction of Mauro Mendonça Filho.

Between 2013 and 2014 she joined the cast of the novel Joia Rara, as Hilda, an aspiring singer.

In 2014, she began dating oil businessman Mariano Ferraz, whom she married on October 3, 2015 at the Copacabana Palace hotel. Soon after, she announced that she was pregnant with her second child, Sophia Valdetaro Ferraz, who was born on July 2, 2016. On October 26, 2016, her husband was arrested by Operation Car Wash, accused of corruption and money laundering. After the businessman was officially sentenced to 10 years in prison in 2018, the couple decided to separate so as not to interfere in Luiza's life.

== Filmography ==
=== Television ===
Year	Title	Role	Notes
2002	Malhação	Nanda's friend	Season 9 Episode: "12 September"
2003	Celebridade	Gabriela Santino (Gabi)	
2005	América	Manuela Valente (Manu)	
2006	Malhação	Manuela Prado (Manu)	Season 13
2007	Pé na Jaca	Tânia	Episodes: "6–7 March"
2008	Ciranda de Pedra	Mirna Valentim	
2009	Deu a Louca no Tempo	Nina / Ruth	
2009	Viver a Vida	Glória Silveira	
2011	Cordel Encantado	Antônia Cabral	
2012	Gabriela	Gerusa Bastos Falcão	
2013	Joia Rara	Hilda Hauser	

=== Film ===
Year	Title	Role
2010	Bed & Breakfast	Babita
2014	O Candidato Honesto	Amanda
2014	Like Sunday, Like Rain	Corina
2016	King of Oil	Denise Eisenberg
2018	Se a Vida Começasse Agora	Bia
