= Os Caras de Pau =

- Also known as: The Barefaceds
- Genre: television comedy Sitcom
- Created by: Chico Soares
- Directed by: Márcio Trigo
- Creative director: Marcius Melhem
- Starring: Leandro Hassum; Marcius Melhem
- Opening theme: "Os Caras de Pau theme"
- Ending theme: "Os Caras de Pau"
- Country of origin: Brazil
- Original language: Portuguese
- No. of seasons: 3
- No. of episodes: 115 (list of episodes)

Production
- Producers: Cláudio Lisboa; Cláudio Torres Gonzaga; Marcius Melhem; Paulo Cursino; Suzana Pires
- Production locations: Rio de Janeiro, Brazil; Fortaleza, Brazil; Switzerland
- Camera setup: Multi-camera
- Running time: 45 minutes

Original release
- Network: Globo
- Release: 4 April 2010 – 3 February 2013

Related
- Zorra Total

Os Caras de Pau (in English, The Barefaceds) is a Brazilian comedy program aired by Rede Globo on Sunday. Created by Chico Soares and directed by Márcio Trigo and starring Leandro Hassum, Marcius Melhem.

== Production ==
=== Conception ===
The program began in a special made by TV Globo in 2006 but came to prominence in 2010 when he won a fixed time in the grid on Sunday. The program began with sketches, such that the best were chosen by the public for the creation of the first DVD of the duo. Result, there was the creation of a program of light and good taste, because it was not something forced, but a program with a script and with people who know what does. In 2010, the recognition came as the humorous Extra TV won the award for the best comedy shows, and the interpreters Leandro Hassum and Marcius Melhem also won awards for best comedians of the year, by Meus Prêmios Nick and the Melhores do Ano. In 2011, the program reached the pinnacle of success, winning the International Prize "Montreux Comedy Awards" in Switzerland.

== Cast ==
=== Principal ===
JS	Actor	Character
1	Leandro Hassum	Jorginho
2	Marcius Melhem	Pedrão
3	Alexandra Richter	Babi

=== Secondary ===
Actor
Cândido Damm
Paulo Carvalho
Augusto Madeira
Marcos Holanda
Josie Antello
Miguel Nader
Patrícia Pinho
Mayara Lepre
Márcio Lima
Alexandre Regis
Cláudio Cinti
Ana Baird
Larissa Machado
Magda Gomes
Cláudio Mendes
Pedro Henrique
Marcello Caridade

=== Special participation ===
Actor	Character
Matheus da Silva	Joanzim

== Ratings ==
It is estimated that in August 2012, the series was viewed by 7.96 million viewers,^{[n1]} and received an IBOPE rating of 14/40.
[n1]: Each point equals 569,259 viewers.
