= Debra Messing =

American actress (born 1968)

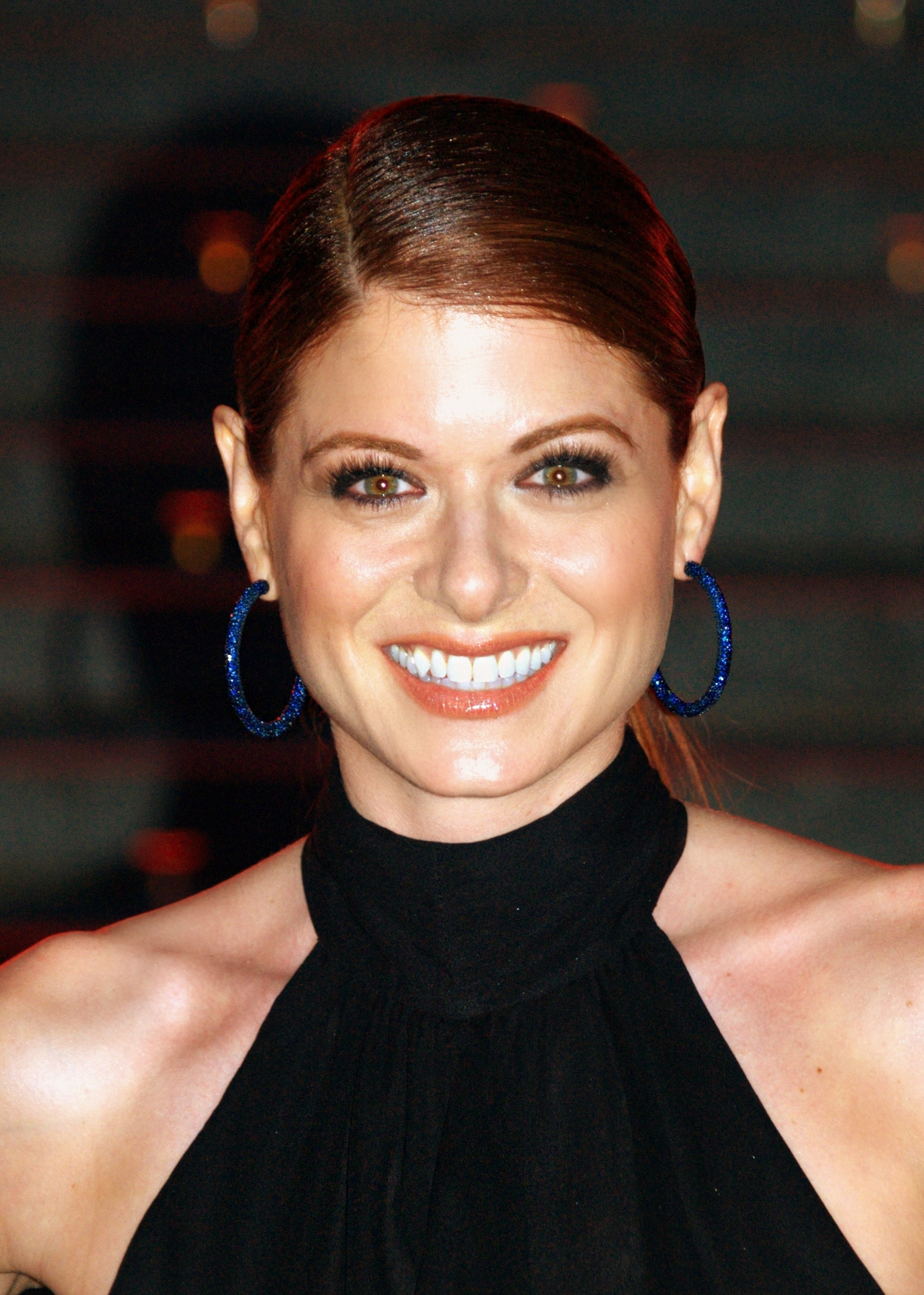
- Messing in 2009
- Born: Debra Lynn Messing; August 15, 1968 (age 58); New York City, U.S.
- Education: Brandeis University (BA); New York University (MFA)
- Occupation: Actress
- Years active: 1993–present
- Spouse: Daniel Zelman (m. 2000; div. 2016)
- Children: 1

Debra Lynn Messing (born August 15, 1968) is an American actress. After graduating from New York University's Tisch School of the Arts, Messing starred in the television series Ned and Stacey on Fox (1995–1997) and Prey on ABC (1998). She achieved her breakthrough role as Grace Adler, an interior designer, on the NBC sitcom Will & Grace (1998–2006, 2017–2020), for which she received seven Golden Globe Award nominations and five Primetime Emmy Award nominations for Outstanding Lead Actress in a Comedy Series, winning once, in 2003.

From 2007 to 2008, Messing starred as Molly Kagan, the ex-wife of a Hollywood film mogul, on the television miniseries The Starter Wife and the TV series of the same name, for which she received two Golden Globe nominations, a Primetime Emmy Award nomination, and a Screen Actors Guild Award nomination. Thereafter, she appeared as Broadway playwright Julia Houston on the NBC musical drama Smash (2012–2013) and as homicide detective Laura Diamond on the NBC police-procedural comedy The Mysteries of Laura (2014–2016). From 2017 to 2020, Messing reprised her role as Grace Adler on NBC's three season revival of Will & Grace, garnering a ninth Golden Globe nomination for her performance.

Messing's film work includes A Walk in the Clouds (1995), Jesus (1999), The Mothman Prophecies (2002), Hollywood Ending (2002), Along Came Polly (2004), The Wedding Date (2005), Lucky You (2007), The Women (2008), Nothing Like the Holidays (2008), Searching (2018), 13: The Musical (2022), and The Alto Knights (2025). She has also lent her voice to animated films such as Garfield (2004) and Open Season (2006).

== Early life and education ==
Messing was born in Brooklyn, New York, the daughter of Sandra Ellen (née Simons), who worked as a professional singer, banker, and travel and real estate agent, and Brian Messing, a sales executive for a costume jewellery packaging manufacturer. Her family is Jewish, and her ancestors emigrated to the U.S. from Russia; Przecław, Poland; and London, England. Messing had a Bat Mitzvah ceremony. When Messing was three, she moved with her parents and her older brother, Brett, to East Greenwich, Rhode Island.

While Messing's parents encouraged her dream of becoming an actress, they also urged her to complete a liberal arts education before deciding on acting as a career. Following their advice, she attended Brandeis University, where, at her parents' request, three-quarters of her courses were not theater-related.

In 1990, after graduating summa cum laude from Brandeis with a Bachelor of Arts in Theater Arts, Messing gained admission to the elite Grad Acting Program at New York University's Tisch School of the Arts, which accepts 16 new students annually. She earned a Master of Fine Arts after three years.

== Career ==
In 1993, Messing won acclaim for her performance as Harper in the pre-Broadway workshop production of Tony Kushner's play Angels in America: Perestroika. Subsequently, she appeared in several episodes of the television series NYPD Blue during 1994 and 1995.

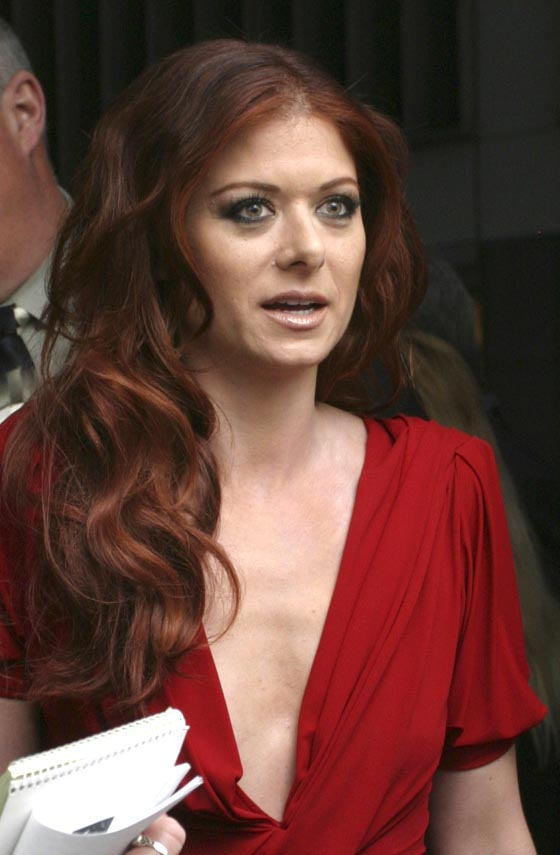
Messing at the Tribeca Film Festival 2009 premiere of Whatever Works

In 1995, Messing made her film debut in Alfonso Arau's A Walk in the Clouds playing the unfaithful wife of main character Paul Sutton (Keanu Reeves). This exposure led Fox to make her the co-star of the television sitcom Ned & Stacey. The series lasted for two seasons, from 1995 to 1997. Messing appeared as Jerry Seinfeld's romantic interest in two episodes of the series Seinfeld: "The Wait Out" in 1996 and "The Yada Yada" in 1997. Messing turned down a starring role in another television sitcom to appear in Donald Margulies's two-character play Collected Stories, which opened at the off-Broadway Manhattan Theatre Club. She also co-starred in the Tom Arnold vehicle McHale's Navy in 1997.

In 1998, Messing played a lead role as the bioanthropologist Sloan Parker on ABC's dramatic science-fiction television series Prey. During this time, her agent approached her with the pilot script for the television show Will & Grace. Messing was inclined to take some time off, but the script intrigued her, and she auditioned for the role of Grace Adler, beating Nicollette Sheridan, who later guest-starred on the show as Grace's romantic rival. Will & Grace became a ratings success, and Messing received critical acclaim for her performance.

Director Woody Allen cast Messing in a supporting role in his film Hollywood Ending (2002). Her film roles since include Richard Gere's ill-fated wife in the supernatural thriller The Mothman Prophecies (2002) and a supporting role as an unfaithful bride in Along Came Polly (2004). The Wedding Date (2005) was Messing's first leading role in a high-profile film. It received mixed reviews but performed fairly well at the box office.

Messing was featured as a judge on the season finale of the second season of Bravo's reality show Project Runway. Also in 2005, along with Megan Mullally, she was awarded the Women in Film Lucy Award in recognition of her excellence and innovation in her creative works that have enhanced the perception of women through the medium of television.

She also starred in the television miniseries The Starter Wife (2007), which was nominated for ten Emmy Awards, including one for Messing for Outstanding Lead Actress in a Miniseries or Movie. In 2008, Messing reprised her role as Molly Kagan in the television series The Starter Wife, consisting of 10 episodes. In early 2010, Messing starred in the ABC comedy pilot Wright vs. Wrong for the 2010–2011 primetime season, but ABC did not pick-up the pilot.

In July 2011, Messing was ranked no. 22 on the TV Guide Network special, Funniest Women on TV. In February 2011, producers announced that Messing would star in a new NBC musical pilot called Smash for the 2011–2012 primetime season. In May 2011, it was reported that NBC picked up the show as a series for the 2011–2012 season. The show premiered on February 6, 2012. The show was later renewed for a second season after which it was cancelled.

Messing appeared with Green Day singer Billie Joe Armstrong and Leighton Meester in Frank Whaley's drama film Like Sunday, Like Rain in 2014. For her performance, Messing won the 2014 Best Actress Award at The Williamsburg Independent Film Festival.

She made her Broadway debut in John Patrick Shanley's play Outside Mullingar alongside Tony Award winner Brían F. O'Byrne, which began previews at the Samuel J. Friedman Theatre on January 3, 2014. Outside Mullingar was nominated for Best Play for the 68th Annual Tony Awards.

Messing starred in The Mysteries of Laura, a police procedural television show that premiered in September 2014. The series lasted for two seasons and ended in 2016. Messing portrayed Marjorie Houseman in the television remake of the film Dirty Dancing (1987). It aired on ABC in May 2017. She starred again as Grace Adler in the revival of Will & Grace on NBC. The revival aired for three seasons, from September 2017 to April 2020.

In 2022 she come back to Broadway acting in the leading role on Birthday Candles at the American Airlines Theatre being nominated at the Outer Critics Circle Awards for Best Actress in a Play. In 2024 she starred as on Off-Broadway play Shit. Meet. Fan at MCC Theater.

== Activism ==
In 2004, Messing started working on political campaigns by knocking on doors and making phone calls. She has frequently criticized Donald Trump since his presidential run in 2016. She was a part of "the Resistance" during the first Trump administration, and has championed liberal causes such as LGBTQ rights.

In 2018, Messing and Mandana Dayani founded a nonpartisan organization called "I am a voter" to educate and mobilize voters. As of July 2022, Messing supported the Democratic Party, but has since said that she feels she no longer has a political home and considers herself "party-less".

=== Gaza war ===
Messing has been a vocal supporter of Israel since the October 7 attacks. In November 2023, she gave a speech at the March for Israel in Washington, D.C. During a video call between 30 Jewish celebrities and TikTok executives that included Messing, she questioned why the anti-Zionist slogan "from the river to the sea" was not blocked by TikTok. On a December 2023 trip to Israel organized by the Creative Community for Peace, Messing met with members of the Israeli military and families of the hostages.

Some social media users have expressed gratitude to Messing for sharing stories about the hostages and their families, while others have criticized her posts about the Gaza war as disregarding the Gaza humanitarian crisis and the Palestinian death toll. In January 2024, Messing was criticized for mocking Palestinian journalist Motaz Azaiza over his decision to leave the Gaza Strip amid Israel's killing of journalists.

Messing has signed open letters related to the Gaza war, including letters criticizing Jonathan Glazer's Oscars acceptance speech for The Zone of Interest, Bisan Owda's Emmy nomination, and the Film Workers for Palestine boycott of Israeli film institutions.

Messing appeared in and served as executive producer for October 8, a 2025 documentary about antisemitism during the Gaza war.

== Personal life ==
Messing met Daniel Zelman, an actor and screenwriter, on their first day as graduate students at New York University in 1990. They were married on September 3, 2000, and lived in Manhattan. They have a son. In 2011, she and Zelman separated, and were officially divorced in 2016. Messing dated her Smash co-star Will Chase from the end of 2011 to October 2014.

== Filmography ==
=== Film ===
Year	Title	Role	Notes
1995	A Walk in the Clouds	Betty Sutton	
1997	McHale's Navy	Lt. Penelope Carpenter	
1998	Celebrity	TV reporter	
2002	The Mothman Prophecies	Mary Klein	
2002	Hollywood Ending	Lori	
2003	Marion's Triumph	Narrator	
2004	Along Came Polly	Lisa Kramer	
2004	Garfield	Arlene (voice)	
2005	The Wedding Date	Kat Ellis	
2006	Open Season	Beth (voice)	
2007	Purple Violets	Kate Scott	
2007	Lucky You	Suzanne Offer	
2008	The Women	Edie Cohen	
2008	Nothing like the Holidays	Sarah Rodriguez	
2014	Like Sunday, Like Rain	Barbara	
2016	Albion: The Enchanted Stallion	The Queen	
2018	Searching	Detective Sergeant Rosemary Vick	
2020	Irresistible	Babs Garnett	
2020	The Dark Divide	Thea Linnea Pyle	
2022	13: The Musical	Jessica Goldman	
2022	Bros	Herself	
2025	October 8	Herself	Documentary; also executive producer
2025	The Alto Knights	Bobbie Costello	

=== Television ===
Year	Title	Role	Notes
1994–95	NYPD Blue	Dana Abandando	3 episodes
1995	Partners	Stacey	Episode: "City Hall"
1995–97	Ned and Stacey	Stacey Colbert	Main role
1996, 1997	Seinfeld	Beth Lookner	Episodes: "The Wait Out" & "The Yada Yada"
1998	Prey	Dr. Sloan Parker	Main role
1998–2006, 2017–20	Will & Grace	Grace Adler	Main role
1999	Jesus	Mary Magdalene	Television film
2002	King of the Hill	Mrs. Hilgren-Bronson (voice)	Episode: "Get Your Freak Off"
2006, 2012	Project Runway	Herself / Guest judge	Season 2, Episode: "Finale – Part 2"; Season 10, Episode: "I Get a Kick Out of Fashion"
2007	The Starter Wife	Molly Kagan	Miniseries (6 episodes)
2008	The Starter Wife	Molly Kagan	Main role
2009	Sesame Street	Herself	Episode: "4190"
2011	Law & Order: Special Victims Unit	Alicia Harding	Episode: "Pursuit"
2012–13	Smash	Julia Houston	Main role
2014–19	Project Runway All Stars	Herself / Guest judge	3 episodes
2014–16	The Mysteries of Laura	Detective Laura Diamond	Lead role
2015	Jeopardy!	Herself	4 episodes
2016	Match Game	Herself	Episode #1.1
2016–17	Nightcap	Herself	2 episodes
2017	Dirty Dancing	Marjorie Houseman	Television film

== Awards and nominations ==
Messing's most honored role is as Grace Adler on Will & Grace, which earned her seven Golden Globe Award nominations for Best Lead Actress in a Television Series – Comedy or Musical; five Primetime Emmy Award nominations for Outstanding Lead Actress in a Comedy Series, one of which she won in 2003; and seven Screen Actors Guild Award nominations: two for Outstanding Performance by a Female Actor in a Comedy Series and five for Outstanding Performance by an Ensemble in a Comedy Series – winning one in 2001.

=== Honors ===
- 2017: Inducted into the Hollywood Walk of Fame and received a star for her contribution to Television – located at 6201 Hollywood Blvd.
- 2024: Was named one of 18 “American Zionist Women You Should Know” by Hadassah Foundation, The Women’s Zionist Organization of America.
- 2024: Received the Hadassah Foundation’s Honor of Esther: Women of Courage, Inspiration, and Commitment Award, for her public advocacy and leadership on issues affecting Jewish people and Israel, as well as supporting the fight against antisemitism.
- 2025: Honored with the Israeli Film Festival Achievement In Film And Television Award.

=== Accolades ===
Organizations	Year	Category	Work	Result
American Comedy Awards	2000	Funniest Female Performer in a Television Series	Will & Grace	Nominated
American Comedy Awards	2001	Funniest Female Performer in a Television Series	Will & Grace	Nominated
Audie Awards	2010	Audiobook of the Year	Nelson Mandela's Favorite African Folktales	Won
Audie Awards	2010	Multi-Voiced Performance	Nelson Mandela's Favorite African Folktales	Won
Critics' Choice Movie Awards	2019	Best Actress in a Comedy Television Series	Will & Grace	Nominated
Emmy Awards (Primetime)	2000	Outstanding Lead Actress in a Comedy Series	Will & Grace	Nominated
Emmy Awards (Primetime)	2001	Outstanding Lead Actress in a Comedy Series	Will & Grace	Nominated
Emmy Awards (Primetime)	2002	Outstanding Lead Actress in a Comedy Series	Will & Grace	Nominated
Emmy Awards (Primetime)	2003	Outstanding Lead Actress in a Comedy Series	Will & Grace	Won
Emmy Awards (Primetime)	2006	Outstanding Lead Actress in a Comedy Series	Will & Grace	Nominated
Emmy Awards (Primetime)	2007	Outstanding Lead Actress in a Limited Series or Television Movie	The Starter Wife	Nominated
Golden Globe Awards	2000	Best Actress – Television Series Musical or Comedy	Will & Grace	Nominated
Golden Globe Awards	2001	Best Actress – Television Series Musical or Comedy	Will & Grace	Nominated
Golden Globe Awards	2002	Best Actress – Television Series Musical or Comedy	Will & Grace	Nominated
Golden Globe Awards	2003	Best Actress – Television Series Musical or Comedy	Will & Grace	Nominated
Golden Globe Awards	2004	Best Actress – Television Series Musical or Comedy	Will & Grace	Nominated
Golden Globe Awards	2005	Best Actress – Television Series Musical or Comedy	Will & Grace	Nominated
Golden Globe Awards	2008	Best Actress – Miniseries or Television Film	The Starter Wife	Nominated
Golden Globe Awards	2009	Best Actress – Television Series Musical or Comedy	The Starter Wife	Nominated
Golden Globe Awards	2019	Best Actress – Television Series Musical or Comedy	Will & Grace	Nominated
Gracie Awards	2008	Outstanding Female Lead – Miniseries	The Starter Wife	Won
Online Film & Television Association Awards	1999	Best Actress in a New Comedy Series	Will & Grace	Nominated
Online Film & Television Association Awards	1999	Best Ensemble in a New Comedy Series	Will & Grace	Nominated
Online Film & Television Association Awards	1999	Best Actress in a Comedy Series	Will & Grace	Nominated
Online Film & Television Association Awards	2000	Best Actress in a Comedy Series	Will & Grace	Nominated
Online Film & Television Association Awards	2000	Best Ensemble in a Comedy Series	Will & Grace	Won
Online Film & Television Association Awards	2001	Best Actress in a Comedy Series	Will & Grace	Nominated
Online Film & Television Association Awards	2001	Best Ensemble in a Comedy Series	Will & Grace	Won
Online Film & Television Association Awards	2002	Best Actress in a Comedy Series	Will & Grace	Nominated
Online Film & Television Association Awards	2002	Best Ensemble in a Comedy Series	Will & Grace	Nominated
Online Film & Television Association Awards	2003	Best Actress in a Comedy Series	Will & Grace	Nominated
Online Film & Television Association Awards	2006	Best Actress in a Comedy Series	Will & Grace	Won
Online Film & Television Association Awards	2007	Best Actress in a Miniseries or Motion Picture Made for Television	The Starter Wife	Nominated
Outer Critics Circle Awards	2022	Outstanding Actress in a Play	Birthday Candles	Nominated
People's Choice Awards	2005	Favorite Female Television Star	Will & Grace	Nominated
People's Choice Awards	2015	Favorite Actress in a New Television Series	The Mysteries of Laura	Nominated
Satellite Awards	2002	Best Actress in a TV Series Comedy or Musical	Will & Grace	Won
Satellite Awards	2003	Best Actress in a TV Series Comedy or Musical	Will & Grace	Won
Satellite Awards	2004	Best Actress in a TV Series Comedy or Musical	Will & Grace	Nominated
Satellite Awards	2007	Best Actress in a Miniseries or TV Film	The Starter Wife	Nominated
Satellite Awards	2008	Best Actress in a Motion Picture Comedy or Musical	Nothing like the Holidays	Nominated
Screen Actors Guild Awards	2001	Outstanding Performance by a Female Actor in a Comedy Series	Will & Grace	Nominated
Screen Actors Guild Awards	2001	Outstanding Performance by an Ensemble in a Comedy Series	Will & Grace	Won
Screen Actors Guild Awards	2002	Outstanding Performance by an Ensemble in a Comedy Series	Will & Grace	Nominated
Screen Actors Guild Awards	2003	Outstanding Performance by an Ensemble in a Comedy Series	Will & Grace	Nominated
Screen Actors Guild Awards	2004	Outstanding Performance by a Female Actor in a Comedy Series	Will & Grace	Nominated
Screen Actors Guild Awards	2004	Outstanding Performance by an Ensemble in a Comedy Series	Will & Grace	Nominated
Screen Actors Guild Awards	2005	Outstanding Performance by an Ensemble in a Comedy Series	Will & Grace	Nominated
Screen Actors Guild Awards	2008	Outstanding Performance by a Female Actor in a Television Movie or Miniseries	The Starter Wife	Nominated
Teen Choice Awards	2001	Choice TV Actress	Will & Grace	Nominated
Teen Choice Awards	2002	Choice TV Actress – Comedy	Will & Grace	Nominated
Teen Choice Awards	2006	Choice TV Actress – Comedy	Will & Grace	Nominated
TV Guide Awards	2001	Best Actress of the Year in a Comedy Series	Will & Grace	Won
TV Guide Awards	2006	Editor's Choice Award	Will & Grace	Won
TV Guide Awards	2012	Favorite Comeback	Smash	Nominated
Viewers for Quality Television Awards	1999	Best Actress in a Quality Comedy Series	Will & Grace	Nominated
Viewers for Quality Television Awards	2000	Best Actress in a Quality Comedy Series	Will & Grace	Nominated
Williamsburg Independent Film Festival	2014	Best Featured Actress	Like Sunday, Like Rain	Won
