= Murilo Rosa =

Brazilian actor (born 1970)

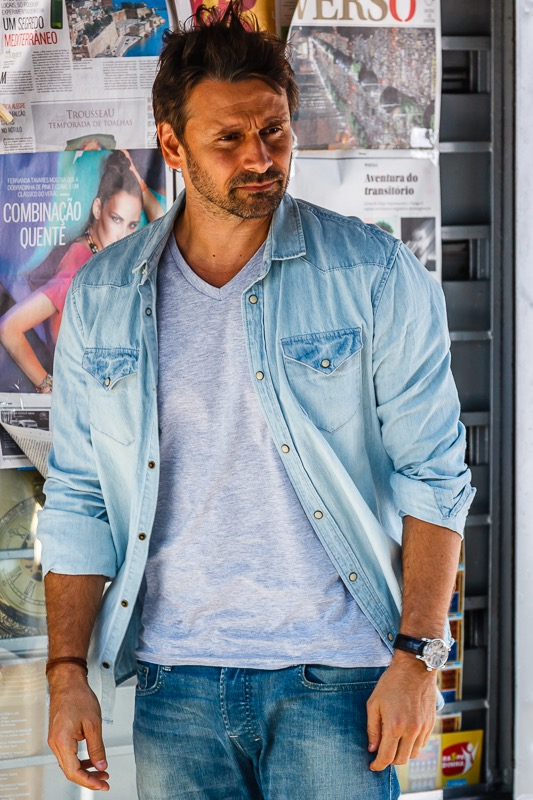
- Rosa in 2015
- Born: Murilo Araújo Rosa; 21 August 1970 (age 56); Brasília, DF, Brazil
- Occupation: Actor
- Years active: 1993–present
- Spouse: Fernanda Tavares (m. 2007)
- Children: 2
- Parent(s): Odair Rosa (father); Maria Luiza Araújo (mother)

Murilo Araújo Rosa (born 21 August 1970) is a Brazilian actor.

== Personal life ==
Married to Brazilian supermodel Fernanda Tavares on July 28, 2007, at Our Lady of the Rosary Church, in Goiás, the same church that his grandparents and his parents, the lawyer Odair Domingos Rosa and professor Maria Luíza Araújo Rosa, married. With her two children, Lucas, born in 2007 and Artur born in 2012.

He is a black belt in Taekwondo and before becoming an actor, when he was still an athlete, he won two world championships in his category. He currently serves as the ambassador of taekwondo in Brazil, and even played a Taekwondo master in one of Brazil's most prolific soap operas, Malhação.

== Filmography ==
=== Television ===
Year	Title	Role
1994	74.5 - Uma Onda no Ar	Carlos Daniel
1994	Confissões de Adolescente, Histórias de Amor	Marcelo Kinderé
1995	Malhação	Jurandir
1995	Você Decide, Perigo Ambulante	
1996	Antônio Alves, Taxista	Henrique
1996	Xica da Silva	Martim Caldeira Brant
1997	Mandacaru	Tenente Aquiles
1999	Chiquinha Gonzaga	Amadeu
1999	Força de um Desejo	Eugênio Cardoso
2000	Terra Nostra	Vitório
2000	Você Decide, A Poderosa	
2000	Você Decide, O Poderoso	
2000	O Cravo e a Rosa	Celso de Lucca
2001	Sítio do Picapau Amarelo, A Festa da Cuca	
2001	A Padroeira	Diogo Soares Cabral
2002	Brava Gente, Ariosvaldo e o Lobisomem	Lobisomem
2003	A Casa das Sete Mulheres	Afonso Côrte Real
2003	Retrato Falado	
2004	Um Só Coração	Frederico Schmdit da Silva
2005	América	Dinho
2006	Bang Bang	Josh Lucas
2007	A Diarista, Aquele do Casal 20	Cláudio Celso
2007	Desejo Proibido	Miguel
2008	Casos e Acasos, As Testemunhas, o Hóspede e os Amantes	Cássio
2008	Casos e Acasos, Ele é Ela, Ela é Ele e Ela ou Eu	Rubens
2009	Caminho das Índias	Lucas Garrido
2009	Exagerados	
2010	Araguaia	Solano Rangel
2011	Macho Man	Oswaldo
2012	Salve Jorge	Élcio Spinelli Flores Galvão
2018	Orgulho e Paixão	Jorge
2018	Rio Heroes	Jorge Pereira
2020	Salve-se Quem Puder	Mário Furtado
2025	Beleza Fatal	Dr. Tomás Monteiro

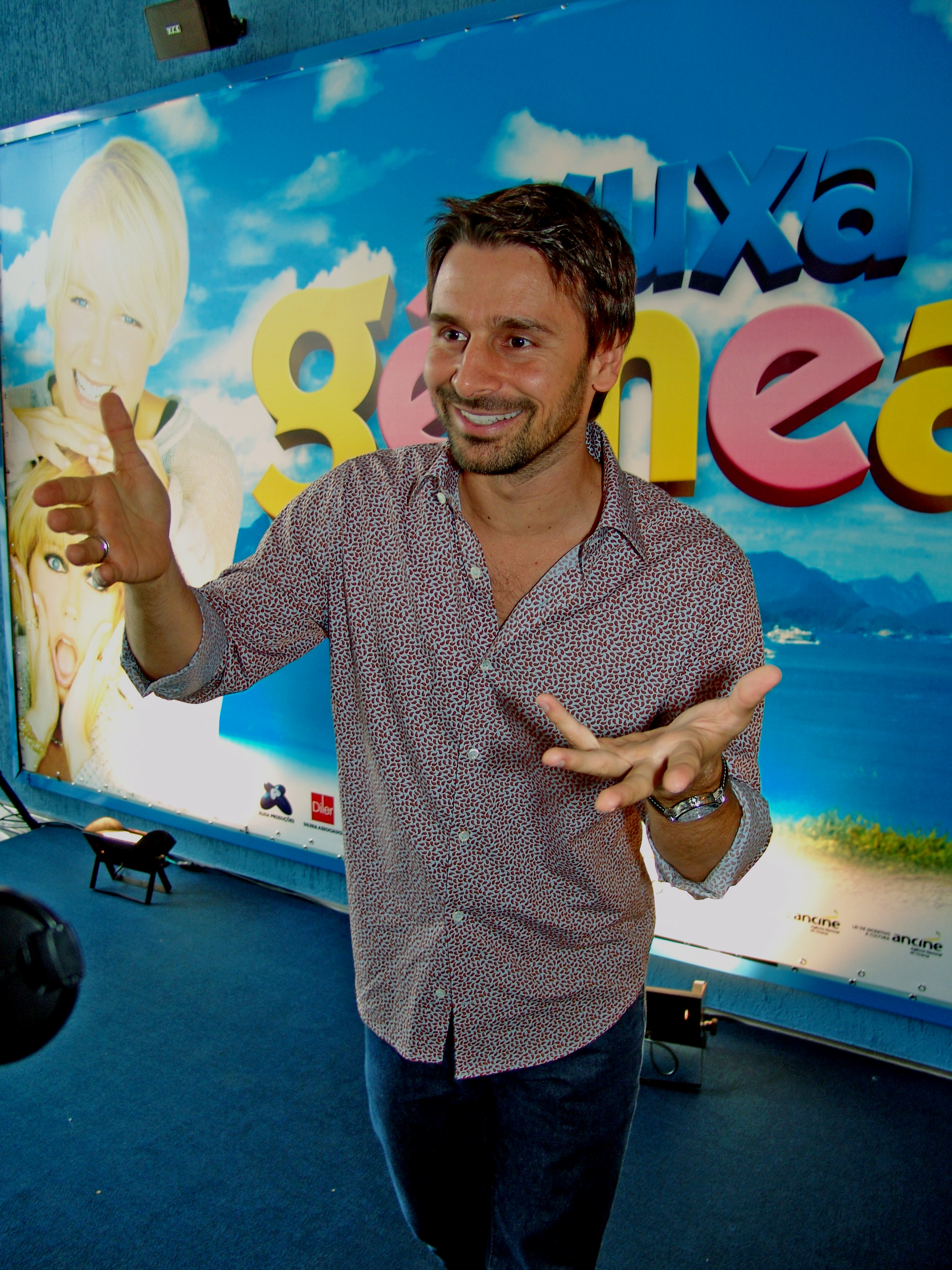
Murilo at the premiere of the movie Xuxa Gêmeas.

== Film ==
Year	Title	Role	Ref
1995	Uma Vida Dividida	Joaquim	
1997	Promessas	Felipe	
1998	Você Sabe Quem	Paulo	
1998	Ismael e Adalgisa	Ismael	
2004	Olga	Estevan	
2005	O Segredo	Dudu	
2006	Xuxa Gêmeas	Ivan	
2008	Orquestra dos Meninos	Mozart	
2009	No Olho da Rua	Otoniel	
2010	Como Esquecer	Hugo	
2010	Aparecida - O Milagre	Marcos Resende	
2011	Area Q	João Batista	
2011	Vazio Coração	Hugo Kari	
2012	Brave	Lorde Macintosh (Brazilian voice dubbing)	
