= Márcio Garcia =

Brazilian actor

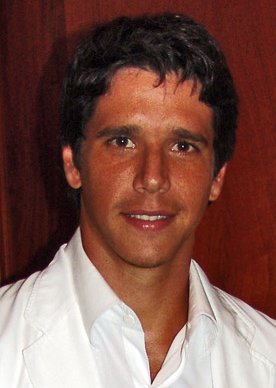
- Born: Márcio Garcia Machado; 17 April 1970 (age 56); Rio de Janeiro, Brazil
- Years active: 1994–present

Márcio Garcia Machado (born 17 April 1970) is a Brazilian actor, television host, writer, producer and film director.

== Biography ==
Márcio started his career at MTV, but in 1994 he moved to Rede Globo. He was a host of a children's show called "Gente Inocente" (Innocent People). From 1997 to 1999 he represented "Video Show", a show about television, artists and ecc. After 10 years at Globo TV, he went to Rede Record where he was a host of "O Melhor do Brasil" (The Best of Brasil).

His contract expired in 2008 and he decided not to renew it. Glória Perez invited him in her new telenovela named "Caminho das Indias", in which Marcio played his first part as a protagonist.

Márcio is married to Andrea Santa Rosa and they have four children: Pedro, Nina, Felipe and João.

== Filmography ==
=== Novelas ===
- 2013 – Amor à Vida .... Guto
- 2009 – Caminho das Índias .... Bahuan Sundrani
- 2006 – Vidas Opostas .... Jorge Alencar
- 2005 – Prova de Amor .... Paulo Barão
- 2003 – Celebridade .... Marcos Rangel
- 1999 – Andando nas Nuvens .... Arnaldo San Marino
- 1998 – Era Uma Vez .... motorista de táxi
- 1997 – Anjo Mau .... Luís Carlos Machado
- 1996 – Anjo de Mim .... Nando Monterrey
- 1995 – Cara & Coroa .... Guiga
- 1994 – Tropicaliente .... Cassiano

=== Television ===
- 2005–2008 – O Melhor do Brasil .... host
- 2006 – Avassaladoras - A Série .... Caíque
- 2005 – Mandrake – Ronaldo
- 2003 – Sem Saida - TV Record
- 2003 – Os Normais .... Nuno
- 2002 – Os Normais .... Caio
- 2002 - Sítio do Picapau Amarelo .... Príncipe Rajá Codadade
- 1999 – Você Decide
- 1999 – Gente Inocente .... host
- 1998 – Malhação .... Adriano
- 1996 – Ponto a Ponto
- 1995 – Você Decide

== Film ==
- 2016 - A Era do Gelo: O Big Bang .... Diego (Brazilian Dub)
- 2012 - 31 Minutos, O Filme .... Túlio Triviño (Brazilian Dub)
- 2012 - A Era do Gelo 4 .... Diego (Brazilian Dub)
- 2012 – Open Road ....Director
- 2010 – Bed & Breakfast ....Director
- 2009 – A Era do Gelo 3 .... Diego (Brazilian dub)
- 2008 – Carmo .... Diamantino dos Anjos
- 2007 – The Ugly Duckling and Me! .... Feio – adult (Brazilian dub)
- 2006 – A Era do Gelo 2 .... Diego (Brazilian dub)
- 2006 – Back to Gaya .... Zino (Brazilian dub)
- 2006 – Journey to the End of the Night .... owner of the club
- 2005 – DragonBlade .... Lang (Brazilian dub)
- 2003 – Xuxa Abracadabra .... Mateus
- 2002 – A Era do Gelo .... Diego (Brazilian dub)
- 1999 – Zoando na TV .... Ulisses
- 1996 – O Guarani .... Peri
- 1999 - Ice
