= List of Brazilian films of 1970 =

A list of films produced in Brazil in 1970:

| Title | Director | Cast | Genre | Notes |
|---|---|---|---|---|
| A Arte de Amar Bem | Fernando de Barros | Eva Wilma, Raul Cortez, Luíza de Franco | | |
| A Chegada de Lampião no Inferno | Sergio Moniz | | | |
| A Dança das Bruxas | Francisco Dreux | Lúcia Marina Accioli, Acyr Castro, Angela Maria Cunha | Fantasy | |
| A Família do Barulho | Júlio Bressane | Maria Gladys, Wilson Grey, Helena Ignez | Comedy | |
| A Guerra dos Pelados | Sylvio Back | Irineu Adami, Otávio Augusto, João Miguel Barbizan | War drama | |
| A Herança | Ozualdo Ribeiro Candeias | David Cardoso, Bárbara Fazio, Rosalvo Caçador | Drama | |
| A Máquina Invisível | Zelito Viana | | | |
| A Vingança Dos Doze | Marcos Farias | Maurício do Valle, Jorge Gomes, Rejane Medeiros | | |
| A Ilha dos Paqueras | Fauzi Mansur | | Comedy | |
| A Moreninha | Glauco Mirko Laurelli | Sonia Braga, David Cardoso, Nilson Condé | Romantic musical | |
| A Possuída dos Mil Demônios | Carlos Frederico Rodrigues | Amaury Alves, Dita Corte Real, Antero de Oliveira | Horror | |
| Amor em Quatro Tempos | Vander Sílvio | Adriana, Big Boy, Sandra Camarão | Musical | |
| Angels and Demons | Carlos Hugo Christensen | Eva Christian, Geraldo Del Rey, Luiz Fernando Ianelli | Drama | |
| Ascensão e Queda de um Paquera | Victor di Mello | Cláudio Cavalcanti, Mário Benvenutti, Dilma Lóes | Comedy | |
| As Escandalosas | Miguel Borges | Olívia Pineschi, Ivan Cândido, Edson Silva | | |
| As Gatinhas | Astolfo Araujo | Sérgio Hingst, Adriana Prieto, Joana Fomm | Drama | |
| Awakening of the Beast | José Mojica Marins | José Mojica Marins, Ângelo Assunção, Ronaldo Beibe | Horror drama | |
| Audácia | Antônio Lima, Carlos Reichenbach | Jorge Bodanzky, Letácio Camargo, Maurice Capovila | | |
| Azyllo Muito Louco | Nelson Pereira dos Santos | Nildo Parente, Isabel Ribeiro, Arduíno Colassanti | Comedy drama | |
| Balada Dos Infiéis | Geraldo Santos Pereira | Nadir Fernandes, Egídio Eccio, Francisco Di Franco | Drama | |
| Barão Olavo, o Horrível | Júlio Bressane | Rodolfo Arena, Helena Ignez, Isabella | Comedy | |
| Betão Ronca Ferro | Geraldo Affonso Miranda, Pio Zamuner | Amácio Mazzaropi, Geny Prado, Roberto Pirillo | Comedy | |
| Beto Rockfeller | Olivier Perroy | Luis Gustavo, Plínio Marcos, Lélia Abramo | Comedy | |
| Brasileiros em Hollywood | Raul Roulien | | | |
| Caveira, My Friend | Alvaro Guimarães | Caveirinha, Baby Consuelo, Manoel Costa | Drama | |
| Cleo e Danie | Roberto Freire | John Herbert, Irene Stefânia, Chico Aragão | Drama | |
| Como Cansa Ser Romano nos Trópicos | Roberto Kahane | | | |
| Copacabana Mon Amour | Rogério Sganzerla | Joãozinho da Gomeia, Laura Galano, Helena Ignez | Comedy | |
| Cuidado, Madame | Júlio Bressane | Maria Gladys, Helena Ignez, Suzana de Moraes | | |
| Cutting Heads | Glauber Rocha | Francisco Rabal, Marta May, Rosa Maria Penna | Drama | |
| Der Leone Have Sept Cabeças | Glauber Rocha | Rada Rassimov, Giulio Brogi, Gabriele Tinti | Drama | |
| Elas | Jose Roberto Noronha | Maria Aparecida, José Luís Araújo, Otávio Augusto | Comedy | |
| Em Busca do Su$exo | Roberto Pires | Cláudio Marzo, Eulina Rosa, Berta Loran | Drama | |
| Em Cada Coração um Punhal | João Batista de Andrade | Etty Fraser, John Herbert, Liana Duval | Comedy | |
| Estranho triângulo | Pedro Camargo | André José Adler, Lúcia Alves, José Ary | Drama | |
| Éxtasis tropical | Armando Bo | Armando Bo, Miguel A. Olmos, Isabel Sarli | Drama | |
| Fantastikon, Os Deuses do Sexo | J. Marreco, Tereza Trautman | Denise Correa, Filomena, Garabade | | |
| Gamal, O Delírio do Sexo | João Batista de Andrade | Joana Fomm, Paulo César Peréio, Lorival Pariz | | |
| Inocentes Porém Ingênuos | José Vedovato | | Comedy | |
| Janjão Não Dispara... Foge! | Pereira Dias | Edison Acri, Ronaldo Bres, Eunice Conceição | Comedy | |
| Jardim de Guerra | Neville de Almeida | Joel Barcellos, Zózimo Bulbul, Hugo Carvana | Drama | |
| Jesus Cristo, Eu Estou Aqui | Mozael Silveira | Zé Trindade, Costinha, Colé Santana | Comedy | |
| João de Barro | Raffaele Rossi | Renata Candu, Ivan Carlos, Zé do Paiol | Comedy | |
| Le maître du temps | Jean-Daniel Pollet | Duda Cavalcanti, Renato Coutinho, Uracy D'Oliveira | Drama | |
| Lost Love Juliana | Sérgio Ricardo | Maria Do Rosario, Francisco Di Franco, Macedo Neto | Drama | |
| Mágoas de Caboclo | Ary Fernandes | Chico Fumaça, Luciano Gregory, Peter Thomas | Comedy | |
| Marcado Para o Perigo | Ary Fernandes | Jane Batista, Xandó Batista, Luciano Gregory | Thriller | |
| Marcelo Zona Sul | Xavier de Oliveira | Stepan Nercessian, Françoise Forton, Lula | Drama | |
| Memoirs of a Gigolo | Alberto Pieralisi | Cláudio Cavalcanti, Rossana Ghessa, Jece Valadão | Comedy | |
| Meu Pé de Laranja-Lima | Aurélio Teixeira | Júlio César Cruz, Aurélio Teixeira, Henrique José Leal | Family | |
| Minha Namorada | Armando Costa, Zelito Viana | Laura Maria, Pedro Aguinaga, Fernanda Montenegro | Comedy | |
| Mortal Sin | Miguel Faria Jr. | Fernanda Montenegro, José Lewgoy, Renato Machado | Drama | |
| Motorista Sem Limites | Milton Barragan | Teixeirinha, Walter D'Ávila, Oswaldo D'ávila | Musical comedy | |
| Não Aperta, Aparício | Pereira Dias | José Mendes, Grande Otelo, José Lewgoy | Adventure | |
| O Anunciador - O Homem das Tormentas | Paulo Bastos Martins | Carlos Moura, Klelma Soares, Paulo Bastos Martins | Mystery | |
| O Bolão | Wilson Silva | Taiguara, Tânia Scher, Suzy Arruda | Comedy | |
| O Enterro da Cafetina | Alberto Pieralisi | Jotta Barroso, Henriqueta Brieba, Jorge Chaia | Comedy | |
| O Pornógrafo | João Callegaro | Stênio Garcia, Edgar Gurgel, Liana Duval | | |
| Orgia ou O Homem Que Deu Cria | João Silvério Trevisan | Fernando Benini, Jean-Claude Bernardet, Marcelino Buru | Comedy | |
| OSS 117 prend des vacances | Pierre Kalfon | Luc Merenda, Edwige Feuillère, Elsa Martinelli | Action adventure | |
| Os deuses E Os Mortos | Ruy Guerra | Norma Bengell, Othon Bastos, Ítala Nandi | Drama | |
| Os Herdeiros | Carlos Diegues | Sérgio Cardoso, Odete Lara, Mário Lago | | |
| Os maridos Traem... E as Mulheres Subtraem | Victor di Mello | José Vasconcelos, Elizabeth Gasper, Mário Benvenutti | Comedy | |
| Os Senhores da Terra | Paulo Thiago | Rodolfo Arena, Milton Moraes, Paulo Villaça | Drama | |
| Pais Quadrados... Filhos Avançados | J. B. Tanko | Antônio Marcos, Lúcia Alves, Ivan Bittencourt | Comedy | |
| The Palace of Angels | Walter Hugo Khouri | Geneviève Grad, Luc Merenda, Rossana Ghessa | Drama | |
| Parafernália o Dia de Caça | Francis Palmeira | Armando Bógus, Irina Greco, Marisa Urban | | |
| Perdidos e Malditos | Geraldo Veloso | Selma Caronezzi, Billy Davis, Maria Esmeralda | Drama | |
| Pindorama | Arnaldo Jabor | Maurício do Valle, Ítala Nandi, Jesus Pingo | | |
| The Prophet of Hunger | Maurice Capovila | José Mojica Marins, Maurício do Valle, Julia Miranda | | |
| Quatro Contra o Mundo | Fernando Amaral, Silvio Autuori | Dóris Carvalho, Gigi da Mangueira, Germana de Lamare | Comedy | |
| República da Traição | Carlos Ebert | Vera Barreto Leite, Antônio Pedro, Zózimo Bulbul | Adventure | |
| Sagrada Família | Sylvio Lanna | Wanda Maria Franqueira, Milton Gontijo, Maria Olívia | Drama | |
| Salário Mínimo | Adhemar Gonzaga | Renata Fronzi, Geraldo Hauers Alves, Paulo Gracindo | | |
| Sangue Quente em Tarde Fria | Fernando Campos, Renato Neumann | Milton Rodríguez, Talula Campos, Francisco Santos | Crime drama | |
| Se Meu Dólar Falasse | Carlos Coimbra | Dercy Gonçalves, Grande Otelo, Borges de Barros | Comedy | |
| Sem Essa, Aranha | Rogério Sganzerla | Helena Ignez, Jorge Loredo, Maria Gladys | | |
| Sertão em Festa | Oswaldo de Oliveira | Aninha, Nhá Barbina, Letácio Camargo | Musical comedy | |
| Simeão, O Boêmio | João Bennio | João Bennio, Sandy Celeste, José De Freitas | Comedy | |
| Som e Forma | Joaquim Assis | | | |
| Sou Louca por Você | Isnard Fernandes, Rui Gomes | Bicky Berger, Jean Lafront, Kleber Macedo | | |
| Ternos Caçadores | Ruy Guerra | Sterling Hayden, Maureen McNally, Susan Strasberg | Drama | |
| This Is Simonal | Domingos de Oliveira | Wilson Simonal, Irene Stefânia, Irma Álvarez | Musical comedy | |
| Um é Pouco, Dois é Bom | Odilon Lopez | Araci Esteves, Odilon Lopez, Francisco Silva | Comedy | |
| Um Uísque Antes, Um Cigarro Depois | Flávio Tambellini | Mário Benvenutti, Ary Fontoura, Samanta | Comedy | |
| Uma Garota em Maus Lençóis | Wilson Silva | Neide Aparecida, Arduíno Colassanti, Emiliano Queiroz | Comedy | |
| Uma Mulher Para Sábado | Mauricio Rittner | Adriana Prieto, Flávio Porto, Miguel di Pietro | Drama | |
| Vida e Glória de um Canalha | Alberto Salvá | Milton Rodríguez, Dilma Lóes, Dita Corte Real | Crime | |
| Vinte passos para a morte | C. Adolpho Chadler | C. Adolpho Chadler, Milton Vilar, Marina Montini | Crime | |

== See also ==
- 1970 in Brazil
- 1970 in Brazilian television
