= Abraccine Top 100 Brazilian films =

List of the best 100 Brizilian films

Cover of the book The 100 Best Brazilian Films, released by Abraccine in 2016

In 2015, the Brazilian Film Critics Association (Abraccine) published a list with the 100 best Brazilian films ever according to the votes of its members. This poll was the basis for a book named The 100 Best Brazilian Films, published in 2016. The idea of the ranking and the book was suggested by publisher Letramento, with whom Abraccine and television network Canal Brasil co-released the book. The ranking was done based on individual lists done by Abraccine's 100 critics, who initially mentioned 379 films. The full list was first made available to the public on 26 November 2015, and the book was released on 1 September 2016.

The list covers almost all decades between the 1930s and the 2010s, the only exception being the 1940s. A 1931 film, Mário Peixoto's Limite, is the oldest one and also the first ranked, while the most recent work is from 2015, Anna Muylaert's The Second Mother. The chanchada (1930–50s musical comedies) is represented by Carlos Manga's O Homem do Sputnik (1959), while there is a plethora of 1960–1970s films, including Cinema Novo and Cinema marginal works. Almost one third of the films were from the Retomada period (1995–onward), and the list included not only feature films but also documentaries and short films. Cinema Novo director Glauber Rocha is the filmmaker with the most films in the list: five; followed by Rogério Sganzerla, Nelson Pereira dos Santos, Héctor Babenco and Carlos Reichenbach, each with four works.

== Release ==
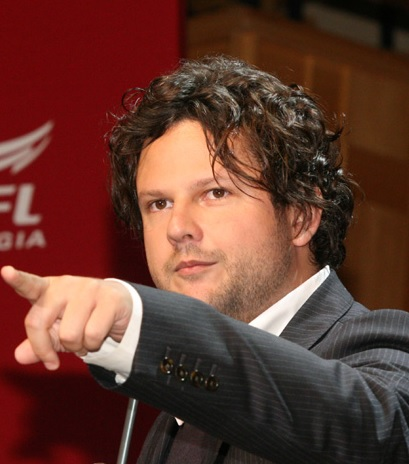
When the first list was released, Joaquim Pedro de Andrade had four films on it. After a recount, his Conjugal Warfare and Hugo Carvana's Bar Esperanza (1983), tied in the last position, were replaced by The Clown (2011), directed by Selton Mello (pictured).

The Brazilian Film Critics Association was founded in 2011, and since then it has been considered one of the best institutions of cinema criticism. As such, there was a long-time demand for Abraccine to release such a list. The list was done after a suggestion of the publisher Letramento. In September 2015, Abraccine and Letramento started to work on a book about the world best films that eventually became about the best Brazilian films only. At first, 379 works were mentioned when all Abraccine's associated critics—more than 100—were asked to send a ranked list of their 25 best films. There was no specific criteria or guideline for these individual lists, each critic freely deciding their list. The final result of the poll was first made available to the public on 26 November 2015. The first list included Joaquim Pedro de Andrade's Conjugal Warfare (1975) and Hugo Carvana's Bar Esperanza (1983) tied in the last position; after a recount of the votes, Selton Mello's The Clown (2011) replaced them. When the book was released, during the Gramado Film Festival on 1 September 2016, some other changes in the ranking order were done.

The book, titled The 100 Best Brazilian Films (Portuguese: Os 100 Melhores Filmes Brasileiros), was the first publication of Abraccine, and was done in a joint venture with Letramento and television network Canal Brasil. Edited by Abraccine's then president Paulo Henrique Silva, the 440-page work contained essays on each film selected. Prior to its release, the association did a research and concluded that only 5% of the Brazilian population watched Brazilian films regularly and most of them did not read film criticism. So, the book was published to draw attention to the importance of the Brazilian cinema and film criticism in a moment Brazilian media "depleted" such discussion, according to Silva. To promote the release of the book, twelve of the selected films were broadcast, in no particular order, on a special timeslot of Canal Brasil between 12 September 2016 and 15 November 2016. Two films aired each week, the first one being Anselmo Duarte's O Pagador de Promessas (1962) and the last being Cláudio Assis' Mango Yellow (2002).

== Content ==
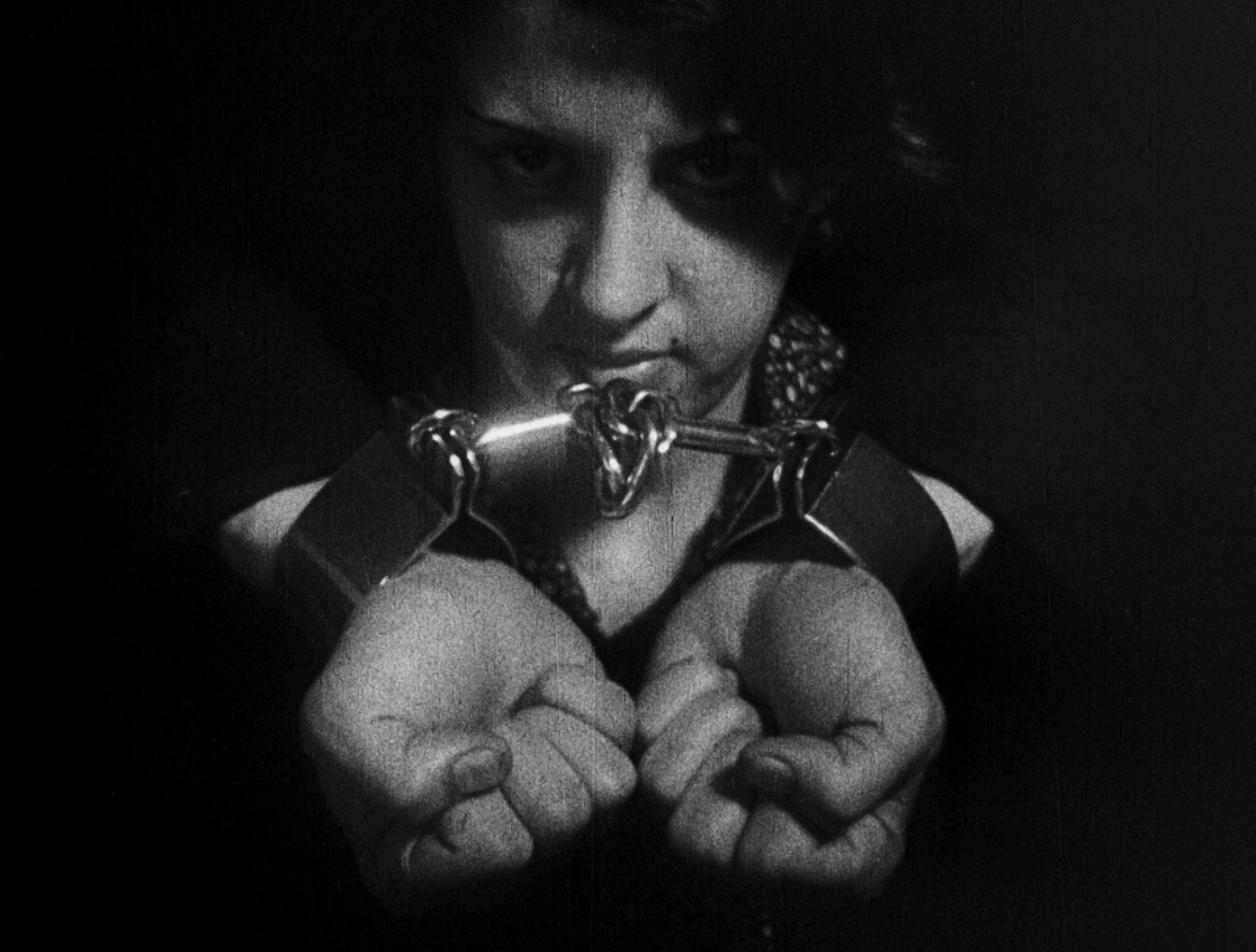
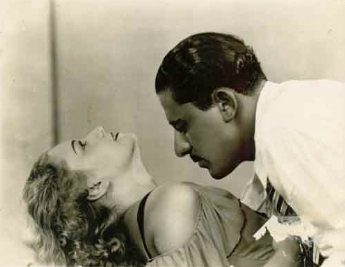
Scenes of the films Limite (1931; left) and Ganga Bruta (1933; right), the oldest films to feature in the list

The list features films of almost all decades from the 1930s to the 2010s, except for the 1940s. The oldest films in the list were Mário Peixoto's Limite (1931), Humberto Mauro's Ganga Bruta (1933), and Lima Barreto's O Cangaceiro (1953), the first being also the first placed; the newest films were Anna Muylaert's The Second Mother (2015), Fernando Coimbra's A Wolf at the Door (2013), and Hilton Lacerda's Tattoo (2013). The 1960s films placed high and seven were in the top 10. From the 1960s, there was a constant presence of Cinema Novo films, which were three—Glauber Rocha's Black God, White Devil (1964) and Entranced Earth (1967), and Nelson Pereira dos Santos' Barren Lives (1963)—of the top 5. Glauber Rocha's 2 films ranked the 2nd and 5th, while Nelson Pereira dos Santos' came the 3rd. Cinema marginal (1960–70s underground films) was also frequent on the list; its representants, Rogério Sganzerla, Júlio Bressane and Ozualdo Candeias had more than one film in the list. 30 films of the Retomada (1995–onward) period feature in the list; however, Fernando Meirelles' Oscar-nominated City of God (2002) is the only to be among the top 10. On the other hand, only one chanchada (1930–50s musical comedies), Carlos Manga's O Homem do Sputnik (1959), appeared on the list, and no pornochanchada (1960–70s sex comedies) was mentioned.

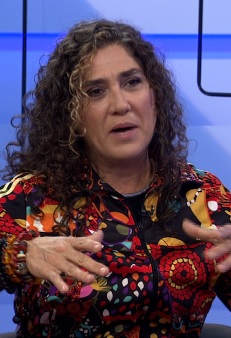
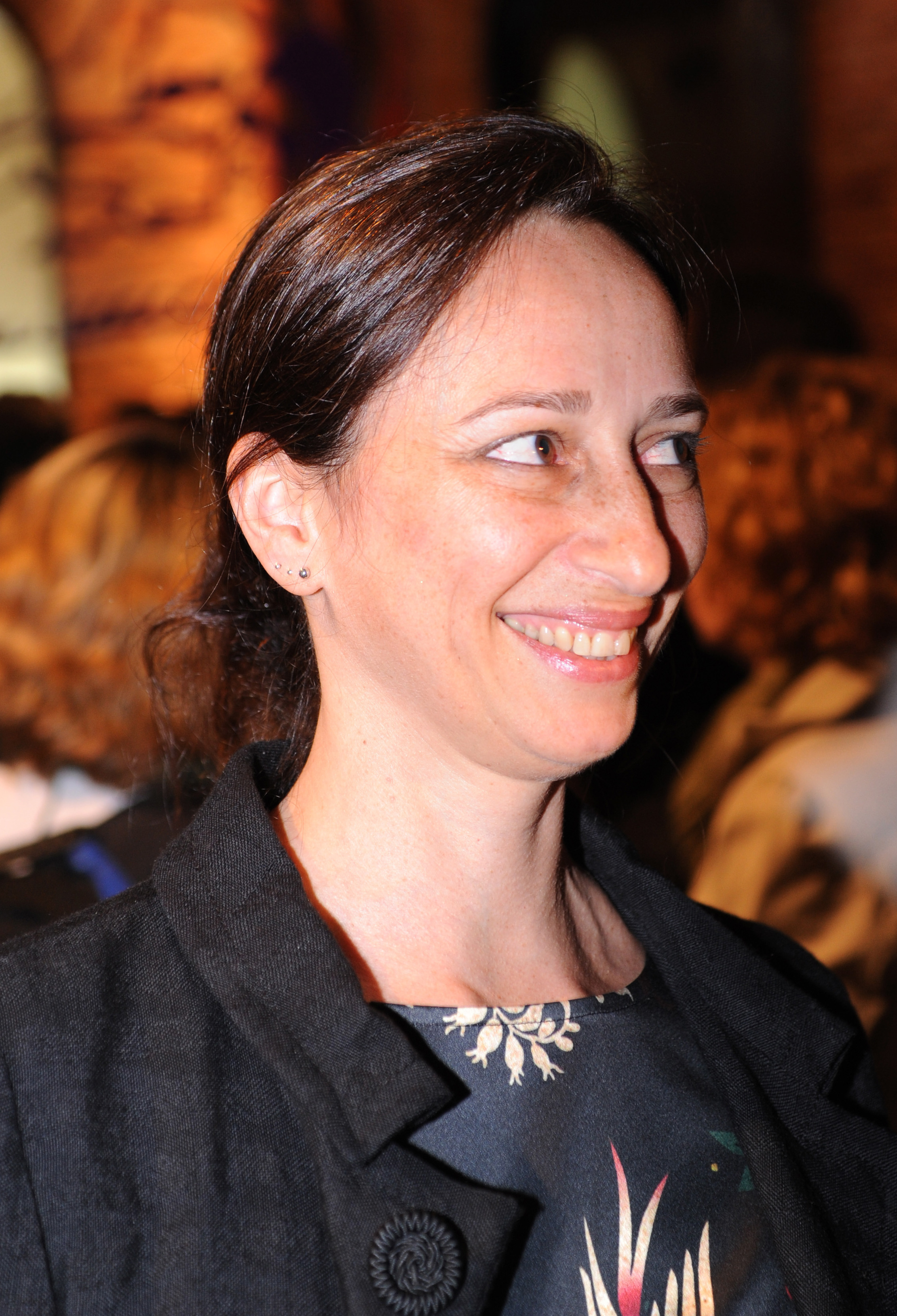
Anna Muylaert (left) and Laís Bodanzky (right) were two out of the four women film directors featured in the list

The most cited director was Rocha, whose works appeared five times in the list. At first, Sganzerla, dos Santos, Héctor Babenco, Carlos Reichenbach, and Pedro de Andrade appeared with four films each. However, the latter was demoted to three films when Conjugal Warfare was removed from the list after a recount. There were only four films directed solely by a woman in the list: Suzana Amaral's Hour of the Star (1985), Muylaert's The Second Mother; Laís Bodanzky's Brainstorm (2001), and Ana Carolina's Sea of Roses (1977).

In addition to feature films, the list also included documentary films—among them, Eduardo Coutinho's Twenty Years Later (1984), which ranked 4th in the list—and short films, such as Jorge Furtado's Isle of Flowers (1989), Rocha's Di (1977), and Linduarte Noronha's Aruanda (1960).

== Superlatives ==
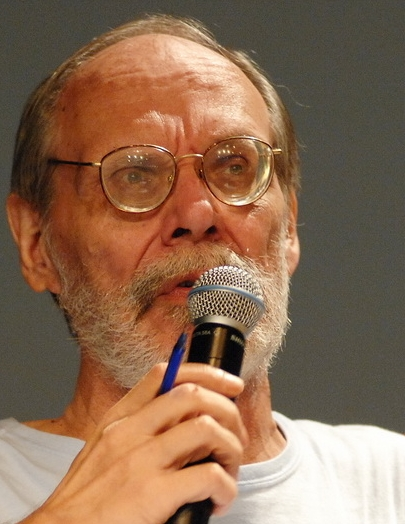
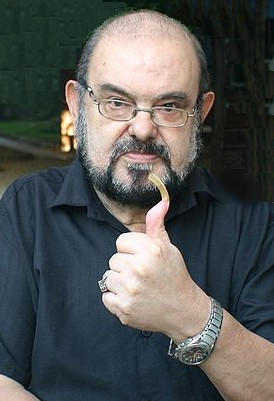
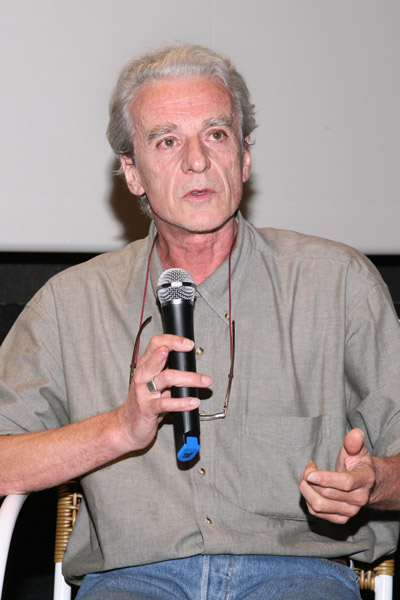
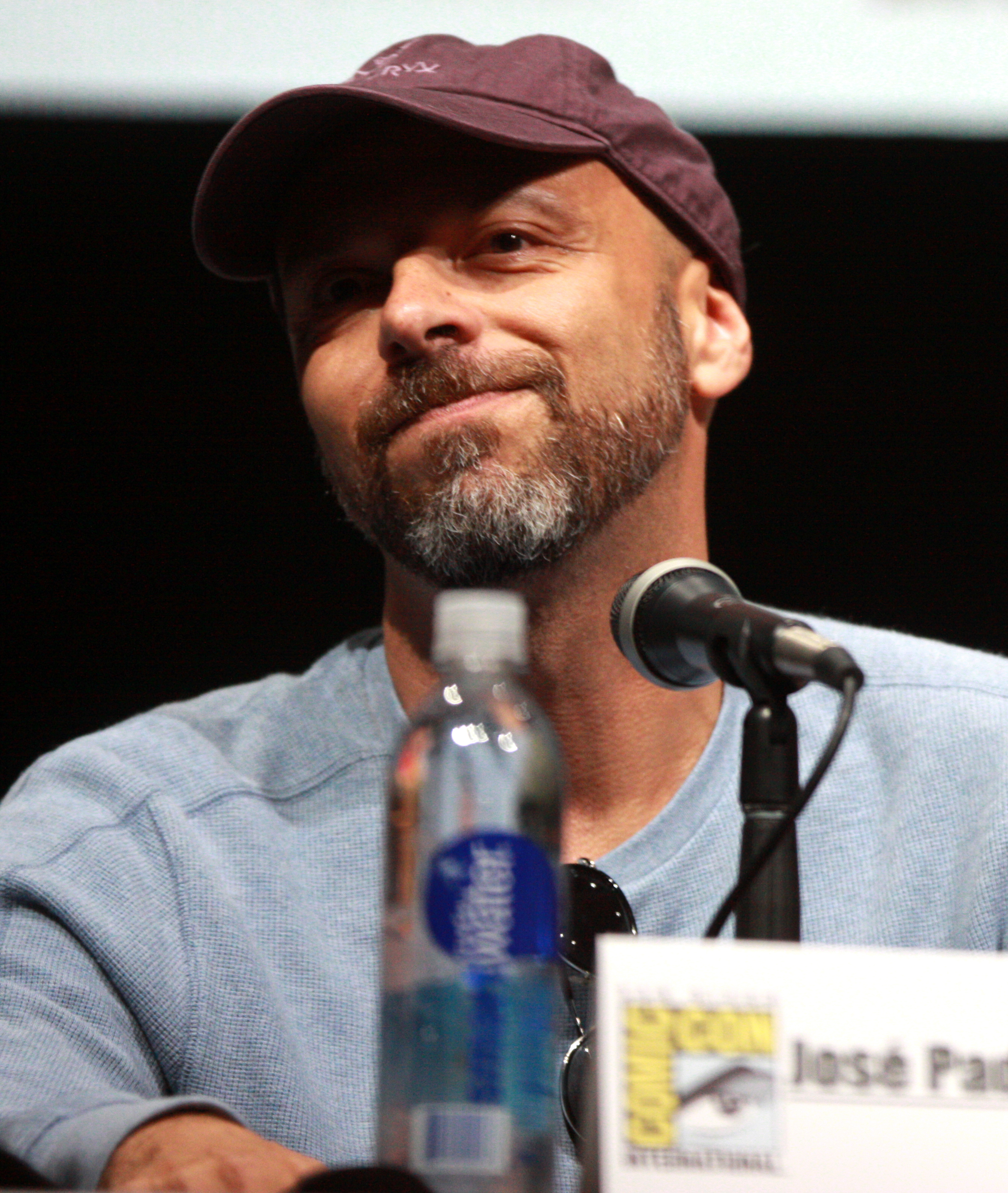
Clockwise from the top left: Carlos Reichenbach, José Mojica Marins, José Padilha, and Andrea Tonacci. Four Reichenbach's films ranked in the list, while all other three directors have three films in the list
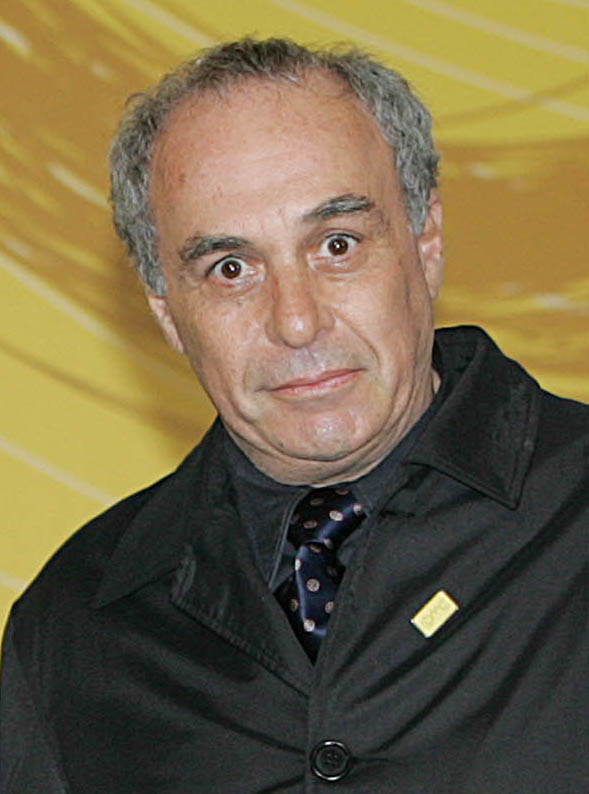
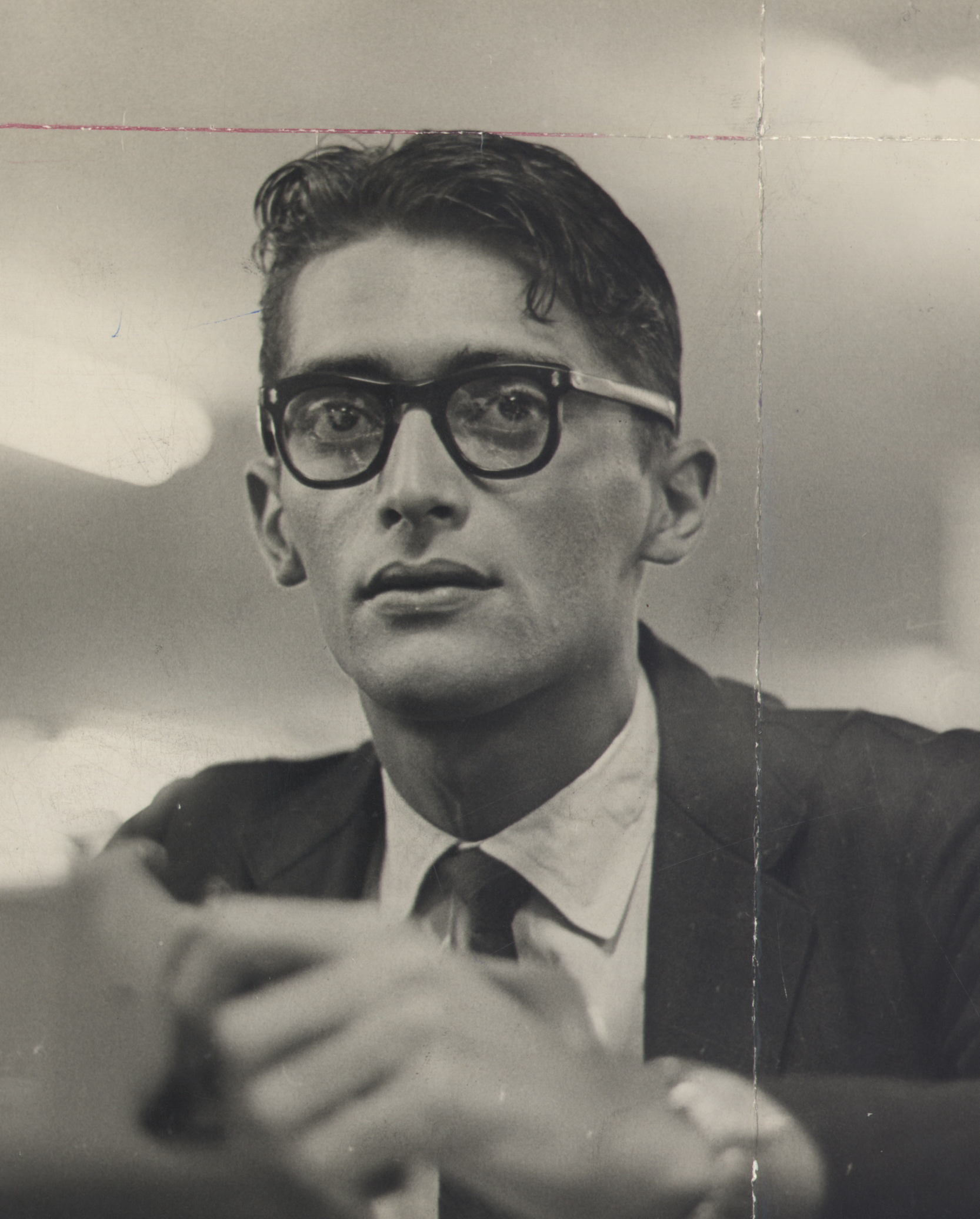
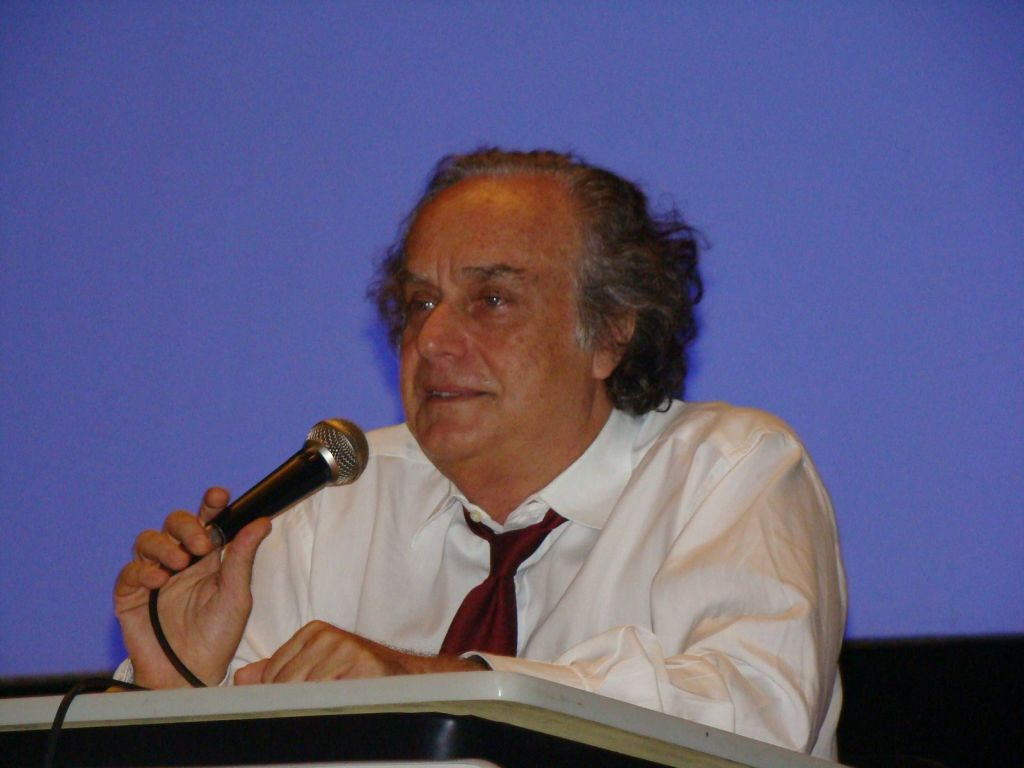
Clockwise from the top left: Ruy Guerra, Júlio Bressane, Arnaldo Jabor, and Walter Lima Jr. All appear twice in the list and their featured works were released between the 1960s and the 1980s
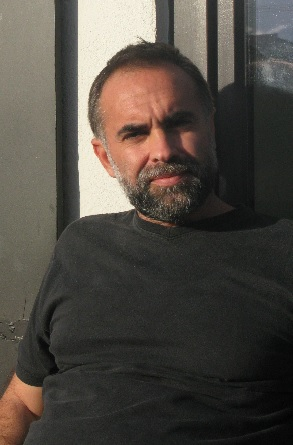
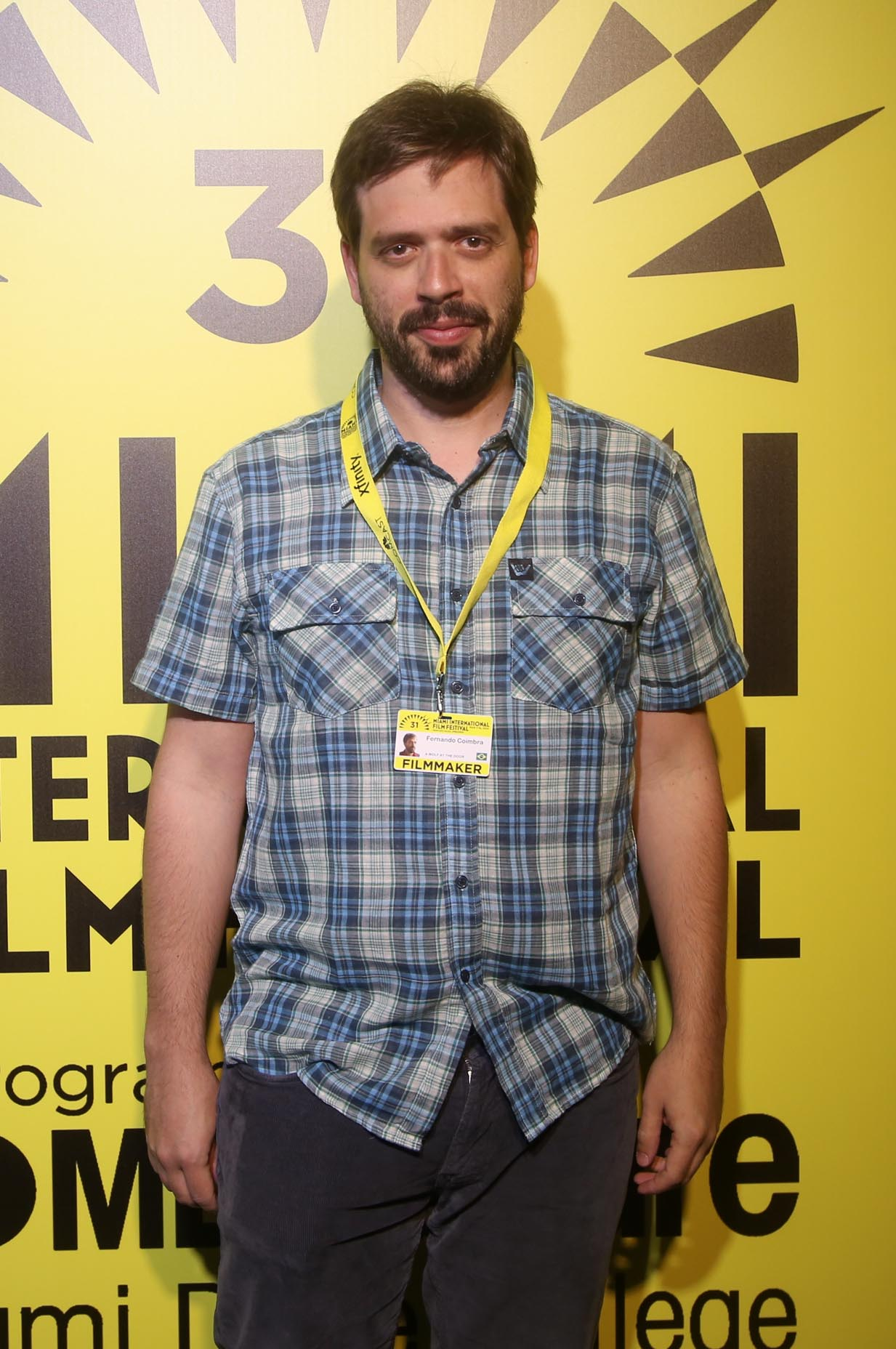
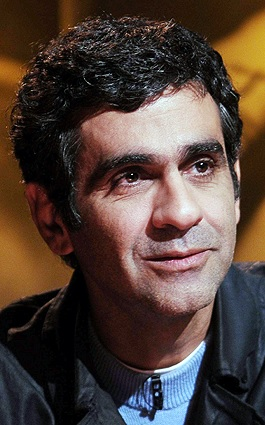
Karim Aïnouz (left) was one of the few 2000s directors to appear twice in the list, while Fernando Coimbra (centre) and Hilton Lacerda (right) were the directors of the most recent films featured in the list along with Muylaert

=== By director ===
5 films

- Glauber Rocha

4 films

- Héctor Babenco
- Carlos Reichenbach
- Nelson Pereira dos Santos
- Rogério Sganzerla

3 films

- Joaquim Pedro de Andrade
- Leon Hirszman
- José Mojica Marins
- José Padilha
- Walter Salles
- Andrea Tonacci
- Eduardo Coutinho

2 films

- Karim Aïnouz
- Júlio Bressane
- Ozualdo Candeias
- Carlos Diegues
- Roberto Farias
- Ruy Guerra
- Arnaldo Jabor
- Walter Lima Jr.
- Luís Sérgio Person
- Roberto Santos

=== By period ===
28 films

- 1960s

18 films

- 1980s, 2000s

15 films

- 1970s

8 films

- 1969

7 films

- 1990s, 2010s

5 films

- 1950s, 2002

4 films

- 1964, 1967

3 films

- 1962, 1968, 1976, 1977, 1980, 1981, 1985, 1999, 2001, 2006, 2007

2 films

- 1930s, 1971, 1978, 1983, 1984, 1989, 2003, 2010, 2013

== Reception ==
While noting that this kind of list always creates some controversy, O Fluminense's Gabriel Oliveira praised the list for its plurality. Ernesto Barros of Recife's Jornal do Commercio opined the list could be wider if outsiders and scholars were invited, but nevertheless considered it to be a good sample of the best of the Brazilian cinema. Writing for Correio da Paraíba, Renato Félix thought the selection method was the "most democratic" one but also said it made impossible to conscious avoid overrepresentation of directors and movements; ultimately, Félix considered it an important publication because it was a good way to determine how Brazilian critics perceived its eras. Enock Cavalcanti did not give an opinion about the list content but commented in Diário de Cuiabá that the list itself should be praised as an effort to overcome the cultural prejudice Brazilian people have toward their country's cinema.

== See also ==
- Time Out 100 best British films
- Films considered the greatest ever
