= Antonio das Mortes =

1969 film directed by Glauber Rocha

- Directed by: Glauber Rocha
- Written by: Glauber Rocha
- Produced by: Glauber Rocha; Zelito Viana; Claude Antoine; Luiz Carlos Barreto
- Starring: Maurício do Valle; Odete Lara; Othon Bastos; Hugo Carvana
- Cinematography: Affonso Beato
- Edited by: Eduardo Escorel
- Music by: Sérgio Ricardo
- Production company: Mapa Filmes
- Distributed by: Mapa Filmes
- Release dates: May 1969 (Cannes); September 6, 1969 (Brazil)
- Running time: 95 minutes
- Country: Brazil
- Language: Portuguese

Antonio das Mortes (Portuguese: O Dragão da Maldade contra o Santo Guerreiro, pronounced [u dɾaˈɡɐ̃w da mawˈdadʒi ˈkõtɾɐ u ˈsɐ̃tu ɡeˈʁe(j)ɾu]; lit. "The Dragon of Wickedness Against the Holy Warrior") is a 1969 Brazilian revisionist western film directed by Glauber Rocha. It features return of the character Antonio das Mortes, now as the protagonist, with Maurício do Valle reprising the role from Black God, White Devil. The original title is a reference to the tale of Saint George and the Dragon.

The film had its world premiere at the main competition of the 1969 Cannes Film Festival, where it was awarded the Best Director prize. It was selected as the Brazilian entry for the Best Foreign Language Film at the 42nd Academy Awards, but it was not nominated.

It is often cited as the last installment of Rocha's film trilogy, preceded by Black God, White Devil and Entranced Earth.

== Plot ==
After the World War II, in the Brazilian sertão. A group of impoverished peasant mystics (beatos) gathered around Dona Santa (Rosa Maria Penna), a female spiritual figure, join in veneration of Saint George with an obscure figure named Coirana (Lorival Pariz). Coirana claims to have restarted the cangaço and seeks to take the revenge of Lampião and other cangaceiro martyrs, presenting the tale of Saint George and the Dragon in a contemporary class conflict context. They threaten the town of Jardim de Piranhas governed by Coronel Horácio (Joffre Soares) a blind and old cattle owner married to younger and attractive Laura (Odete Lara). Dr. Mattos (Hugo Carvana), the corrupt police chief of the town, hires Antônio das Mortes as a jagunço against Coirana and Antônio fatally wounds Coirana in a duel. However, Antônio is changed by his experiences with the poor, and so he then demands that the coronel distribute the food stored in a warehouse to the remaining cangaceiros. The colonel raged and sent Mata Vaca (Vinícius Salvatori) to kill Antônio das Mortes. But Antônio das Mortes with the help of his friend "Professor" (Othon Bastos) kills Mata Vaca and his jagunços. The coronel is killed by Antão (Mário Gusmão), the helper and possibly lover of Dona Santa in a scene reminiscent of Saint George slaying the Dragon iconography. The movie ends with Antônio das Mortes walking by the roadside, carrying on the struggle - in some ways hopeless or unending - which extends beyond the killing of the colonel and the expropriation of his land.

== Cast ==
- Maurício do Valle - Antônio das Mortes
- Odete Lara - Laura
- Othon Bastos - Professor
- Hugo Carvana - Dr. Mattos
- Joffre Soares - Coronel Horácio
- Lorival Pariz - Coirana
- Rosa Maria Penna - Dona Santa
- Vinícius Salvatori - Mata Vaca
- Mário Gusmão - Antão
- Emmanuel Cavalcanti - Priest
- Santi Scaldaferri - Batista
- Conceição Senna - Waitress
- Paulo Lima

== Reception ==
Rocha won the award for Best Director at the 1969 Cannes Film Festival. It was chosen by the Ministry of Culture to represent Brazil in the 42nd Academy Awards, but was not nominated for Best Foreign Language Film.

== Soundtrack ==
- Antonio das Mortes, written & performed by Sérgio Ricardo
- Carinhoso, written by Pixinguinha & João de Barro, performed by Odete Lara & Hugo Carvana
- Coirana, written by Walter Queiroz, performed by Lorival Pariz
- Volta por Cima, written by Paulo Vanzolini
- Ukrinmakrinkrin, for soprano, wind instruments, and piano, composed by Marlos Nobre

== See also ==
- List of submissions to the 42nd Academy Awards for Best Foreign Language Film
- List of Brazilian submissions for the Academy Award for Best Foreign Language Film
