= Wander Piroli =

- Born: 1931; Belo Horizonte
- Died: 3 June 2006 (aged 74–75); Belo Horizonte
- Occupation: Writer, journalist

Wander Piroli (1931 — 3 June 2006) was a Brazilian writer and journalist, author of short stories, crônicas and children's books.

== Biography ==
Pirolli was born and raised in the Lagoinha neighborhood, a frequent location in his work.He studied law at the Federal University of Minas Gerais and worked as a lawyer, abandoning that profession for journalism. He worked as a reporter for publications such as Binômio, Estado de Minas, Suplemento Literário, Última Hora, and O Sol. He was one of the founders of the newspaper Hoje em Dia.

He participated in literary competitions in Belo Horizonte, gaining fame by winning one in 1951 with the short story "O Troco" . He published his first book, A Mãe e o Filho da Mãe, in 1966. In his stories, Pirolli deals with ordinary, marginalized people in Belo Horizonte, such as workers, prostitutes, and scoundrels; a theme for which he was compared to João Antônio. He also became known for his children's books, such as O menino e o pinto do menino, from 1975, and Os rios morrerm de sede, from 1976.

In 1977, he won the Jabuti Prize in the 'Children's Literature' category for his work Os rios morrem de sede.

He published seven books during his lifetime, leaving eighteen unpublished books after his death in 2006.

== Works ==
- 1975 — O menino e o pinto do menino;
- 1976 — Os rios morrem de sede;
- 1977 — Macacos me mordam;
- 1980 — A máquina de fazer amor;
- 1984 — Minha bela putana;
- 1998 — Nem filho educa pai;
- 2004 — Lagoinha (Coleção BH — A cidade de cada um);
- 2006 — É proibido comer a grama;
- 2006 — Eles estão aí fora;
- 2007 — Para pegar bagre de dia é preciso sujar a água;
- 2008 — O Matador;
- 2009 — Os dois irmãos;
- 2014 — Três menos um é igual a sete.
