= Affonso Beato =

Brazilian cinematographer

- Born: Affonso Henrique Beato; July 13, 1941 (age 85); Rio de Janeiro, Brazil
- Occupation: Cinematographer
- Years active: 1965–2021
- Organization: American Society of Cinematographers
- Awards: Lifetime Achievement Award (2013)

Affonso Henrique Beato (born July 13, 1941) is a Brazilian cinematographer.

== Career ==
He started his cinematic career during the 1960s, gaining international recognition with his work on Glauber Rocha's Antonio das Mortes (1969).

He has served as the President of the Brazilian Society of Cinematographers, receiving a Lifetime Achievement Award in 2013.

In 2017, he became a member of The Academy of Motion Picture Arts and Sciences.

== Filmography ==
=== Film ===
Year	Title	Director	Notes
1967	Cara a Cara	Júlio Bressane	
1968	The Brave Warrior	Gustavo Dahl	
1968	Copacabana Me Engana	Antonio Carlos da Fontoura	
1969	Antonio das Mortes	Glauber Rocha	
1969	Máscara da Traição	Roberto Pires	With Pompilho Tostes
1970	Pindorama	Arnaldo Jabor	
1971	Le Maître du temps	Jean-Daniel Pollet	With Jean Collomb
1971	O Capitão Bandeira contra o Dr. Moura Brasil	Antônio Calmon	
1973	The Promised Land	Miguel Littin	
1974	Hot Times	Jim McBride	
1978	The Boss' Son	Bobby Roth	
1981	Circle of Power	Bobby Roth	
1981	Documenteur	Agnès Varda	With Ace Armanaki, Nurith Aviv, Bob Carr, Mosh Levin and Tom Taplin
1983	Los dos Mundos de Angelita	Jane Morrison	
1984	Para Viver um Grande Amor	Miguel Faria Jr.	
1985	Happily Ever After	Bruno Barreto	
1985	Tropclip	Luiz Fernando Goulart	
1986	The Big Easy	Jim McBride	
1989	Great Balls of Fire!	Jim McBride	
1990	Enid Is Sleeping	Maurice Phillips	
1993	The Wrong Man	Jim McBride	
1994	Uncovered	Jim McBride	
1994	Mil e Uma	Suzana de Moraes	
1995	The Flower of My Secret	Pedro Almodóvar	With Alfredo Mayo
1996	Five Days, Five Nights	José Fonseca e Costa	
1997	The Informant	Jim McBride	
1997	Live Flesh	Pedro Almodóvar	
1998	Traição	José Henrique Fonseca; Arthur Fontes; Cláudio Torres	With Breno Silveira
1999	All About My Mother	Pedro Almodóvar	
1999	Orfeu	Carlos Diegues	
2000	Price of Glory	Carlos Ávila	
2001	Ghost World	Terry Zwigoff	
2003	Dot the I	Matthew Parkhill	
2003	God Is Brazilian	Carlos Diegues	
2003	View from the Top	Bruno Barreto	
2003	The Fighting Temptations	Jonathan Lynn	
2005	Dark Water	Walter Salles	
2006	The Queen	Stephen Frears	
2007	Love in the Time of Cholera	Mike Newell	
2008	Nights in Rodanthe	George C. Wolfe	
2013	Time and the Wind	Jayme Monjardim	

=== Television ===
Year	Title	Director	Notes
1992	Minuto da Bossa	Walter Salles	TV special
2009	Maysa: Quando Fala o Coração	Jayme Monjardim	Miniseries
2011	Roberto Carlos Especial	Jayme Monjardim	Episode "Emoções em Jerusalém"

TV movies

Year	Title	Director
1971	Supergirl – Das Mädchen von den Sternen	Rudolf Thome
1991	Blood Ties	Jim McBride
1997	Pronto	Jim McBride
1997	Dead by Midnight	Jim McBride
2004	Plainsong	Richard Pearce
2011	Cinema Verite	Shari Springer Berman; Robert Pulcini

=== Other credits ===
Actor

Year	Title	Role	Notes
1971	Supergirl – Das Mädchen von den Sternen	Man from another planet	TV movie
1993	The Wrong Man	Smuggler	

Director

- Colours (TBA)

== Awards and nominations ==
Year	Award	Category	Title	Result
1967	Brazilia Festival of Brazilian Cinema	Best Cinematography	Cara a Cara	Won
1997	Brazilia Festival of Brazilian Cinema	Best Cinematography	Mil e Uma	Won
1999	Camerimage	Golden Frog	All About My Mother	Nominated
2006	Camerimage	Golden Frog	The Queen	Nominated
2007	Camerimage	Golden Frog	Love in the Time of Cholera	Nominated
1999	Goya Awards	Best Cinematography	All About My Mother	Nominated
1999	Grande Prêmio do Cinema Brasileiro	Best Cinematography	Orfeu	Won
2003	Grande Prêmio do Cinema Brasileiro	Best Cinematography	God Is Brazilian	Nominated
2013	Grande Prêmio do Cinema Brasileiro	Best Cinematography	Time and the Wind	Nominated
