= João Callegaro =

Brazilian filmmaker

João Callegaro is a Brazilian filmmaker born on September 21, 1945, in Joaçaba (Santa Catarina). He is part of the generation of directors of Cinema Marginal (films produced with few financial resources during the military dictatorship), which also includes Carlos Reichenbach, Rogério Sganzerla, Ozualdo Candeias, Glauber Rocha, Julio Bressane, Neville D'Almeida, Walter Lima Jr., Maurice Capovilla, Sylvio Back and others.
