= O Jogo da Vida =

- Directed by: Maurice Capovila
- Written by: Maurice Capovilla; Gianfrancesco Guarnieri; João Antonio (argument)
- Starring: Lima Duarte; Gianfrancesco Guarnieri; Maurício do Valle
- Music by: Aldir Blanc; João Bosco; Chico Buarque de Hollanda; Radamés Gnatalli; Edu Lobo
- Release date: 1977
- Running time: 90 minutes
- Country: Brazil
- Language: Português

O Jogo da Vida is a 1977 Brazilian drama film directed by Maurice Capovila. It is an adaptation of the short story Malagueta, Perus e Bacanaço, by João Antônio.

The film has as special guests the professional sinuca (Brazilian snooker game) players Carne Frita, Joaquinzinho (former Brazilian champion) and João Gaúcho. It features soundtrack by João Bosco and Aldir Blanc and musical direction by Radamés Gnatalli in his last work for cinema.

== Cast ==
- Lima Duarte ... Malagueta
- Gianfrancesco Guarnieri ... Perus
- Maurício do Valle ... Bacanaço
- Joffre Soares ... Lima (special participation)
- Myrian Muniz ... Tonica (special participation)
- Martha Overbeck ... Adélia (special participation)
- Maria Alves ... Bacanaço's wife
- Antônio Petrin...Silveirinha
- Emmanuel Cavalcanti
- Fernando Bezerra
- Thaia Perez
- Oswaldo Campozana
- Maria Vasco
- Cavagnoli Neto
- Wanda Marchetti
- Edson Santos

== Synopsis ==
A trio of misfit friends, Malagueta, Perus and Bacanaço, wander through the São Paulo night planning to win money with scams and betting on cue games. On intervals, flashbacks show scenes of each one's recent past: Malagueta became homeless after his house was torn down after an eviction, Perus (named after the homonymous district), frequently quarrels with his wife for being unsatisfied with his job at a cement factory and his neighborhood, and Bacanaço is seen exploiting women, escaping a shootout and being arrested by acting on Jogo do Bicho.

== Awards and nominations ==
- Festival de Gramado – 1978

Winner – Kikito de Ouro for Best Supporting Actress: Myrian Muniz
Nominated – Best film.
