= Avanti Popolo =

Avanti Popolo can refer to:

- Bandiera Rossa, often also called Avanti Popolo
- Avanti Popolo (1986 film), a 1986 Israeli film
- Avanti Popolo (2012 film), a 2012 Brazilian film
