= Sob o Céu da Bahia =

1956 film

- Theatrical release poster
- Directed by: Ernesto Remani
- Written by: H.B. Correll; Ernesto Remani
- Produced by: Franco Cenni
- Starring: Sérgio Hingst; María Morena
- Narrated by: Murillo Neri
- Cinematography: H.B. Correll
- Edited by: Lúcio Braun
- Music by: Francisco Mignone
- Production company: Corona Filme
- Distributed by: Fama Filmes
- Release dates: 1956 (Cannes); 27 May 1959
- Running time: 90 minutes
- Country: Brazil
- Language: Portuguese

Sob o Céu da Bahia is a 1956 Brazilian adventure film directed by Ernesto Remani. It was entered into the 1956 Cannes Film Festival.

== Cast ==
- Sérgio Hingst as Ramiro
- María Morena as Maria
- Pedro Nemi
- Terry Viana
- Enoque Torres
- Carlos Torres
- Francisco Santos
