= Manuel Carvalheiro =

- Born: Manuel Duarte Ferreira Dias Carvalheiro; 30 December 1950; Lisbon, Portugal
- Died: 21 April 2019 (aged 68); Lisbon, Portugal
- Education: Ecole Pratique des Hautes Etudes; École des Hautes Etudes en Sciences Sociales (Doctorate)
- Occupations: Film director; film theorist; screenwriter; film critic; columnist
- Spouse: Ondina Silva (m. 1974–1985)
- Awards: CICAE award Ficts Fest

Manuel Carvalheiro (Lisbon, 30 December 1950 – Lisbon, 21 April 2019) was a Portuguese filmmaker, documentary filmmaker, screenwriter, independent film producer, essayist, columnist and film critic. He was the first Portuguese film theorist.

== Early life and education ==
Carvalheiro was born in Lisbon on 30 December 1950, during the Portuguese dictatorship. He was the only child of Maria de Lourdes da Silva Ferreira, a paediatrician, and Manuel Teixeira Dias Carvalheiro, an economics graduate, mathematician, and a member of the Portuguese Communist Party, at a time when Communism was perceived as the best political system available, and the only defence against fascism. The family was originally from Figueira da Foz and republican. His paternal grandfather, a bookshop owner, and his paternal aunt and uncle, both lawyers in Coimbra, were all political prisoners.

His parents married on 1 January 1949 and were part of the Communist-led resistance against the fascist regime in Portugal. Their home in Lisbon was used as a safe house for the secret meetings of prominent Communist party leaders, but following a string of political arrests, the family moved to colonial Angola initially settling in Silva Porto before moving to Luanda. His father was the headmaster of Luanda's Industrial and Commercial School, the co-founder of the Cine-club de Luanda, an important film society, and a member of the executive board of the "Angola Cultural Society". Carvalheiro's parents, although prominent members of Portuguese colonial society, moved in Luanda's cultural and literary circle encouraging the work of native writers and poets and supporting Angolan cultural identity and independence movements at the highest level. Consequently, Carvalheiro grew up in a politically charged and cultural environment where he enjoyed more freedom than in mainland Portugal.

Carvalheiro, who held a lifelong passion for photography, was first given a camera aged eight during a trip with his father to Belgian Congo and French Congo, taking both aerial and Congo River crossing photographs. As a teen, he spent a school year in Figueira da Foz, Portugal, and grew closer to his paternal uncle, an amateur photographer and cinephile who would later co-found the Figueira da Foz International Film Festival. Carvalheiro travelled to most European capitals with his parents and went to the 1967 Venice Film Festival.

== Career ==
While at university in Angola he became a film critic for the Luanda University Cinema Circle and for a major colonial newspaper. Aged nineteen and at the peak of the Portuguese Colonial War, he dropped out of the second year of a chemical engineering degree to study cinema in Paris, France, with Jean Rouch, at the Laboratoire Audio-visuel of the Ecole Pratique des Hautes Etudes from which he graduated.

At 22 he was in charge of the Cinema Semiology Seminar at the Sorbonne Nouvelle University and the co-founder of the Bento Caraça Cineclub, a film society, headquartered in the Maison du Portugal, at the Paris Cité Internationale Universitaire. That same year, he became a correspondent for the international film festivals in Berlin, Grenoble, Venice, Karlovy Vary and Cannes where he met some of the major Portuguese Novo Cinema actors and filmmakers.

Carvalheiro and Brazilian filmmaker Glauber Rocha met in 1972 at the Berlin Film Festival, becoming lifelong friends. Glauber Rocha became his mentor and they worked together in France, Portugal and Germany. With news of the Carnation Revolution, Carvalheiro left Paris and drove to Lisbon and arrived four days later to welcome his close friend Glauber Rocha and his girlfriend Juliet Berto into his Lisbon apartment, at Rua dos Lusíadas. Carvalheiro took part in the historic 1 May parade immortalised in the collective film The People in Arms, co-directed by Glauber Rocha. They worked on Free Lisbon, their unfinished film, shot in the days that followed the Carnation Revolution.

In 1976 Carvalheiro defended his thesis Reflections on Eisensteinian Theory in Cinema at the École des Hautes Etudes en Sciences Sociales (EHESS) under the guidance of film theorist Christian Metz. The same year, the Portuguese Consulate in Paris hired him to teach Portuguese to the children of Portuguese emigrants living in Champigny-sur-Marne, a well-known slum on the outskirts of Paris. In 1979, he was one of the signatories of the Manifesto of the Newest Filmmakers, at the 8th edition of the Figueira Film Art.

In 1981 Carvalheiro directed his short film ABC, in Paris, Glauber Rocha's only interview of the kind. Later, he helped Rocha settle in Sintra with his wife and children, working together on Napoleon's Empire, a script that never materialised, as Glauber Rocha died shortly after. The following year, ABC was officially selected by the Huelva International Film Festival, and the CICAE Award winner at the Hyères International Festival du jeune cinéma. In 1982, his short film Salazar's Loves was officially selected by the Berlin International Film Festival.

In 1985 his doctoral thesis on Le cinéma intellectuel: Mutations de la théorie Eisensteinienne, guided by Christian Metz, was granted a Mention Très Bien from the École des Hautes Etudes en Sciences Sociales (EHESS) and gave rise to a book published in Portugal, in 1989.

Carvalheiro was an essayist, a columnist, a film critic, a member of the Portuguese Writers Association and the first Portuguese film theorist. His articles were published in the Cahiers du Cinéma, in Positif, and several prominent Portuguese literary magazines and newspapers (Seara Nova, Vértice, Jornal de Letras, Diário de Notícias, Público, A Capital, Diário de Lisboa, Diário Popular, O Primeiro de Janeiro, O Século and República). He represented Portugal with his short films and documentaries at international film festivals and was a permanent feature at the Festroia International Film Festival (1985–2014). Both controversial and irreverent, he was subsequently marginalised by the Portuguese Film Institute, and although he submitted many films projects and applied for subsidies none were ever approved or granted. He founded his own film production company Filmes Século XXI to make his own independent films and went through many hardships due to a lack of subsidies. This, in turn, led to a negative impact on Carvalheiro's health and on his family and social relations.

At the end of the 1990s he competed in international film festivals with several documentaries, including Recollections of the Equestrian Competitions at the Olympics (1998), which won the Ficts Fest Choice of the Public Award, in 1998.

His friend, Italian author Marco Ferrari based his book Alla rivoluzione sulla due cavalli on Carvalheiro's road trip to Lisbon in the aftermath of the Carnation Revolution. It was later turned into a film, Off to the Revolution by a 2CV, that won the Golden Leopard at the Locarno International Film Festival, in 2001.

He died of sepsis and was buried on 25 April 2019, at the Prazeres Cemetery in Lisbon, a resting place for many famous Portuguese personalities.

== Filmography ==
- 1972 — Glauber Rocha (co-directed with Manuel Madeira)
- 1974 – Free Lisbon (co-directed with Glauber Rocha, unfinished)
- 1976 – The Diary of a Contaminated (short film)
- 1979 – Experiences (short film)
- 1980 – Feminine Monologues (short film)
- 1981 – ABC (short film)
- 1981 – English without Master (short film)
- 1982 – Salazar's Loves (short film)
- 1982 – Around Washington Square (short film)
- 1982 – The Illiterate (short film)
- 1984 – Terrestrial Paradise – Karl Marx (short film)
- 1984 – Yoknapatawpha (short film)
- 1985 – Enquiry (short film)

== Slideshow ==
- 1987 — Dominguez Alvarez's Aspects of Galicia

== Videos ==
- 1989 – Campestral Fusion
- 1994 – Voyage to the Tore Triangle
- 1996 – Centenary Day of Portuguese Oceanography
- 1997 – UNESCO and Expo 98 in the International Year of the Oceans
- 1997 – 11 April: Delivery of an Oceanographic Vessel
- 1998 — Recollections of the Equestrian Competitions at the Olympics
- no date — A certain Collection: The José-Augusto França Exhibition

== Bibliography ==
As Mutações do Cinema / No Tempo do Vídeo, published in Portugal in 1989.

== Awards and nominations ==
CICAE Award, 1982

Ficts Fest, Choice of the Public Award, 1998
