= 1970 in Brazilian television =

This is a list of Brazilian television related events from 1970.

== Events ==
- 21 June - Brazil beat Italy 4-1 to win the 1970 World Cup at Mexico City, Mexico.
- When the World Watched celebrates moments in the 1970 Brazil World Cup where Brazil won all six of games. Boasting superstars Pelé, Jairzinho, Tostao, Rivelino and Carlos Alberto.
- 30 September: TV Excelsior shuts down its activities on its two stations.
- 1 December: Globo em Dois Minutos, a five-minute weekly newscast of TV Globo, begins airing from Monday to Friday, at 9:55 pm and 5:30 pm until 31 December 1971. The concept is later revived by Plantão Globo, which maintains its status as a news program serving the city.

== Networks and services ==
=== Launches ===
Network	Type	Launch date	Notes	Source
TV Gazeta	Terrestrial	25 January		
TV Verdes Mares	Terrestrial	31 January		
RCE TV Cultura	Terrestrial	31 May		
TV Morena Corumbá	Terrestrial	4 October		

=== Closures ===
Network	Type	Closure date	Notes	Source
TV Excelsior	Terrestrial	30 September		

== Births ==
- 19 May - Daniel Boaventura, actor and singer

== See also ==
- 1970 in Brazil
- List of Brazilian films of 1970
