= Aruanda (film) =

1960 film

- Directed by: Linduarte Noronha
- Written by: Linduarte Noronha
- Produced by: Linduarte Noronha; Rucker Vieira
- Cinematography: Rucker Vieira
- Edited by: Rucker Vieira
- Release date: 1960
- Running time: 21 minutes
- Country: Brazil
- Language: Portuguese

Aruanda is a 1960 Brazilian documentary short film by Linduarte Noronha, about the remnants from a former quilombo in the backlands of Paraíba State.

In the 2010s it was voted number 95 on the Abraccine Top 100 Brazilian films list and also number 10 in the documentary list.

== Plot ==
The film shows the daily miserable life of the inhabitants descendants of slavery from a former quilombo located in a semi-arid region of Paraíba State. Using some elements of fiction, the documentary approaches the local reality in an unusual way in the Brazilian cinema until then.

== Production ==
The project was inspired by a report by Linduarte Noronha, a Pernambucano State born journalist based in Paraíba. He assembled a small film crew, composed of Vladimir Carvalho, João Ramiro Mello and Rucker Vieira. The production was also supported by the then National Institute of Educational Cinema, led by filmmaker Humberto Mauro. Subsequent disagreements over the script credits led to the breakup between Linduarte Nogueria with Vladimir Carvalho and João Ramiro Mello, the two presumably short film screenwriters (they were credited only as assistant directors).

== Reception ==
Considered the masterpiece of Linduarte Noronha, the film is also one of the precursors of the Cinema Novo movement.

== Accolades ==
List of awards and nominations
Award	Date of ceremony	Category	Recipient(s) and nominee(s)	Result	Ref.
Bahia Film Festival	1962	Best Short Documentary	Aruanda	Won	
