= Black God, White Devil =

1964 Brazilian film directed by Glauber Rocha

- Theatrical release poster
- Directed by: Glauber Rocha
- Written by: Glauber Rocha
- Produced by: Luiz Augusto Mendes
- Starring: Yoná Magalhães; Geraldo Del Rey; Othon Bastos; Maurício do Valle
- Cinematography: Waldemar Lima
- Edited by: Glauber Rocha; Rafael Justo Valverde
- Music by: Sérgio Ricardo
- Production company: Copacabana Filmes
- Distributed by: Herbert Richers; Copacabana Filmes
- Release date: June 1, 1964
- Running time: 120 minutes
- Country: Brazil
- Language: Portuguese
- Box office: $7,826

Black God, White Devil (Portuguese: Deus e o Diabo na Terra do Sol, "God and the Devil in the Land of the Sun") is a 1964 Brazilian Revisionist Western film directed and written by Glauber Rocha, and starring Othon Bastos, Maurício do Valle, Yoná Magalhães, and Geraldo Del Rey.

Shot in Monte Santo, Bahia, it belongs to the Cinema Novo movement, addressing the sociopolitical setting of the 1960s Brazil. The film was selected as the Brazilian entry for the Best Foreign Language Film at the 37th Academy Awards, but was not accepted as a nominee.

In 2015, the Brazilian Film Critics Association aka Abraccine voted Black God, White Devil the 2nd greatest Brazilian film of all time, in its list of the 100 best Brazilian films.

== Plot ==
In the 1940s, during another drought in the sertão, ranch hand Manoel is fed up with his situation and hopes to buy his own plot of land. His boss tries to cheat him of his earnings and Manoel kills him, fleeing with his wife, Rosa.

Now an outlaw, Manoel travels to the holy site of Monte Santo to join up with a religious cult headed by the self-proclaimed saint Sebastião who condones violence and preaches disturbing doctrines against the wealthy landowners. Meanwhile, the church and local elites hire a bounty hunter by the name of Antônio das Mortes to take out the group. Before Antônio is able to assassinate Sebastião, Rosa stabs him after he kills a baby who is being held by Manoel, leaving him dead, and the two are on the move once again. At this point, the couple end up with a band of cangaceiros also working to take down the government and bosses of the sertão. Antônio is now tasked with assassinating these bandits. He finds head cangaceiros Corisco and Dadá and murders them.

Manoel and Rosa once again by themselves, running from one allegiance to another, in search of their place in a ruthless land.

== Cast ==
- Geraldo Del Rey as Manoel
- Yoná Magalhães as Rosa
- Othon Bastos as Corisco
- Maurício do Valle as Antonio das Mortes
- Lidio Silva as Sebastião
- Sonia Dos Humildes as Dadá
- João Gama as Priest
- Antônio Pinto as Colonel
- Milton Rosa as Moraes
- Roque Santos as Roque

== Production ==
Glauber Rocha was 25 years old when he wrote and began to direct the film. Its filming took place on Monte Santo and Canudos, Bahia lasting from June 18, 1963, to September 2, 1963.

In the scene where we see "Manoel" (Geraldo Del Rey) carrying a huge stone over his head while climbing Monte Santo on his knees, Del Rey insisted on carrying a real stone that weighted over 20 kilos - something that worried Rocha. After the shooting, Del Rey had to take 2 days off, due to fatigue.

During the dubbing of the sound, Othon Bastos performed three voices. Besides dubbing himself as "Corisco", he performed the voice for "Lampião" (whom "Corisco" had "incorporated") and also dubbed "Sebastião", the black God, even though Lídio Silva played the character on screen.

== Release ==
The film was released on DVD in North America for the first time by Koch-Lorber Films.

A 4K restoration had its world premiere at the 2022 Cannes Film Festival, at the Cannes Classics section.

== Reception ==
=== Critical reception ===
Film review aggregator Rotten Tomatoes reported an approval rating of 100%, based on 15 reviews, with a rating average of 8.3/10. Metacritic, which uses a weighted average, assigned the film a score of 74 out of 100, based on 6 critics, indicating "generally favorable" reviews.

A. H. Weiler from The New York Times praised the film, calling it "Simple, black-and-white, more arresting as a shocking polemic than as memorable drama." Ted Shen from The Chicago Reader wrote, "The fusion of European and Afro-Brazilian elements--dialogue, exquisite black-and-white images, and music by Villa-Lobos--is startlingly original and poetical in conveying the hope and despair of the oppressed." Time Out Magazine praised the film's style as being "somewhere between folk ballad and contemporary myth, since the references to Brazilian history and culture are pervasive and fairly opaque to the uninitiated".

=== Awards and nominations ===
The film was nominated for the Palme d'Or at the main competition of the 1964 Cannes Film Festival. It was also selected as the Brazilian entry for the Best Foreign Language Film at the 37th Academy Awards, but was not accepted as a nominee.

In 2015 it was voted number 2 on the Abraccine Top 100 Brazilian films list.

== See also ==
- List of submissions to the 37th Academy Awards for Best Foreign Language Film
- List of Brazilian submissions for the Academy Award for Best Foreign Language Film
