= Bacalhau (film) =

1976 Brazilian comedy film

- Theatrical release poster
- Directed by: Adriano Stuart
- Written by: Adriano Stuart
- Starring: Hélio Souto; Dionísio Azevedo; Maurício do Valle
- Music by: Beto Strada
- Production company: Omega Filmes
- Release date: 1976
- Country: Brazil
- Language: Portuguese

Bacalhau (lit. 'Codfish' or 'Cod') is a 1976 Brazilian comedy film written and directed by Adriano Stuart. It is a pornochanchada—or Brazilian sex comedy film—and a parody of the 1975 American thriller film Jaws. Whereas the plot of Jaws concerns a man-eating great white shark, Bacalhau centers around a killer codfish, known as bacalhau in Portuguese.

Bacalhau stars Hélio Souto, Dionísio Azevedo and Maurício do Valle.
