= The Wrong Man (1993 film) =

1993 film by Jim McBride

- Film poster
- Directed by: Jim McBride
- Written by: Roy Carlson; Michael Thoma
- Produced by: Alan Beattie; Chris Chesser
- Starring: Rosanna Arquette; Kevin Anderson; John Lithgow
- Cinematography: Affonso Beato
- Edited by: Lisa Zeno Churgin
- Music by: Los Lobos
- Distributed by: Republic Pictures
- Release date: September 5, 1993
- Running time: 104 minutes
- Country: United States
- Language: English

The Wrong Man is a 1993 American thriller film directed by Jim McBride and starring Rosanna Arquette, Kevin Anderson, and John Lithgow. It was screened in the Un Certain Regard section at the 1993 Cannes Film Festival.

== Cast ==
- Rosanna Arquette - Missy Mills
- Kevin Anderson - Alex Walker
- John Lithgow - Phillip Mills
- Jorge Cervera Jr. - Captain Diaz
- Ernesto Laguardia - Detective Ortega
- Robert Harper - Felix Crawley
- Dolores Heredia - Rosita
- José Escandón - Balneario Clerk
- Álvaro Carcaño - Bus Driver
- Ted Swanson - First Mate
- Paco Morayta - Bartender
- Gerardo Zepeda - Night Clerk
- Pedro Altamirano - Motorcycle Cop
- Anilú Pardo - Woman Mourner
- Alejandro Bracho - Lieutenant
