= Pierre Kalfon =

French film producer and director

- Occupation: Film director
- Years active: Since 1963

Pierre Kalfon is a French film producer and director.

== Selected filmography ==
Director

- OSS 117 prend des vacances (1970)
- La Cravache – The Whip (1972)

Producer

- A Taste for Women (1964)
- Cinq gars pour Singapour (1967)
- Adelaide (1968)
- The Boldest Job in the West (1969)
- The Palace of Angels (1970)
