= 1970 in Brazil =

Events in the year 1970 in Brazil.

== Incumbents ==
=== Federal government ===
- President: General Emílio Garrastazu Médici
- Vice President: General Augusto Rademaker

=== Governors ===
- Acre: Vacant
- Alagoas: Antônio Simeão de Lamenha Filho
- Amazonas: Danilo Duarte de Matos Areosa
- Bahia: Luís Viana Filho
- Ceará: Plácido Castelo
- Espírito Santo: Cristiano Dias Lopes Filho
- Goiás: Otávio Lage
- Guanabara:
  - Francisco Negrão de Lima (until 15 March)
  - Antonio de Pádua Chagas Freitas (starting 15 March)
- Maranhão:
  - José Sarney (until 14 May)
  - Antônio Jorge Dino (from 14 May)
- Mato Grosso: Pedro Pedrossian
- Minas Gerais: Israel Pinheiro da Silva
- Pará: Alacid Nunes
- Paraíba: João Agripino Maia
- Paraná: Pablo Cruz Pimentel
- Pernambuco: Nilo Coelho
- Piauí:
  - Helvídio Nunes (until 14 May)
  - João Turíbio Monteiro de Santana (14 May-15 May)
  - João Clímaco d'Almeida (from 15 May)
- Rio de Janeiro: Geremias de Mattos Fontes
- Rio Grande do Norte: Walfredo Gurgel Dantas
- Rio Grande do Sul: Walter Peracchi Barcelos
- Santa Catarina: Ivo Silveira
- São Paulo: Roberto Costa de Abreu Sodré
- Sergipe:
  - Lourival Baptista (until 14 May)
  - Wolney Leal de Melo (14 May-4 June)
  - João de Andrade Garcez (from 4 June)

=== Vice governors ===
- Alagoas: Manoel Sampaio Luz
- Amazonas: Deoclides de Carvalho Leal
- Bahia: Jutahy Magalhães
- Ceará: Humberto Ellery
- Espírito Santo: Isaac Lopes Rubim
- Goiás: Osires Teixeira
- Maranhão:
  - Antonio Jorge Dino (until 14 May)
  - Vacant thereafter (from 14 May)
- Mato Grosso: Lenine de Campos Póvoas
- Minas Gerais: Pio Soares Canedo
- Pará: João Renato Franco
- Paraíba: Antônio Juarez Farias (from 12 September)
- Paraná: Plínio Franco Ferreira da Costa
- Pernambuco: Salviano Machado Filho
- Piauí:
  - João Clímaco d'Almeida (until 14 May)
  - Vacant thereafter (from 14 May)
- Rio de Janeiro: Heli Ribeiro Gomes
- Rio Grande do Norte: Clóvis Motta
- Santa Catarina: Jorge Bornhausen
- São Paulo: Hilário Torloni
- Sergipe:
  - Manoel Paulo Vasconcelos (until 14 May)
  - Vacant thereafter (from 14 May)

== Events ==
=== January ===
- January 26: After Leila Diniz's controversial interview to O Pasquim, the government signs Decree-Law Nº 1.077/1970, which censors material "subversive of morals and good customs"

=== March ===
- March 11: Japanese consul-general in São Paulo, Nobuo Okuchi is kidnapped by the leftist guerrilla group Vanguarda Popular Revolucionária.
- March 14: Five political prisoners are released in exchange for the release of Japanese consul Nobuo Okuchi.
- March 15: Japanese consul Nobuo Okuchi is released in the early evening, 97 hours and 45 minutes after being kidnapped by members of the VPR.
- March 25: President Emílio Garrastazu Médici signs a decree-law, providing for the expansion of the Brazilian territorial sea from 12 to 200 nautical miles.

=== June ===
- June 11: West German ambassador Ehrenfried von Holleben is kidnapped in Rio de Janeiro, by the Vanguarda Popular Revolucionária and Ação Libertadora Nacional.
- June 21: Brazil defeats Italy 4–1 to win the 1970 FIFA World Cup in Mexico. It is the third time Brazil wins the FIFA World Cup.

=== July ===
- July 1: Four Vanguarda Popular Revolucionária (VPR) members unsuccessfully attempt to hijack a Cruzeiro do Sul plane with 34 passengers and 7 crew on board. The aircraft was stormed and the hijackers arrested.
- July 31: Brazilian consul Aloísio Mares Dias Gomide is kidnapped in Montevideo, Uruguay, by the Tupamaros; an Uruguayan urban guerrilla group.

=== November ===
- November 15: General elections for senators, federal and state deputies, mayors, and councilors are held.

=== December ===
- December 7: Giovanni Enrico Bucher, the Swiss ambassador to Brazil, is kidnapped by the Ação Libertadora Nacional in Rio de Janeiro; kidnappers demand the release of 70 political prisoners.

== Births ==
=== January ===
- January 1 – João Miguel, actor
- January 20 – Andrucha Waddington, director and producer

=== April ===
- April 18 – Patrícia Bastos, singer
- April 20 – Adriano Moraes, rodeo performer

=== May ===
- May 22 – Pedro Diniz, racing driver

=== June ===
- June 7 –
  - Ronaldo da Costa, long-distance runner
  - Cafu, footballer
- June 8 – Seu Jorge, Musical artist

=== August ===
- August 11 – Daniella Perez, actress (died 1992)
- August 27 – Edinho, footballer and manager

=== September ===
- September 4 – Igor Cavalera, drummer
- September 19 – Sonny Anderson, footballer

== Deaths ==
=== February ===
- February 20 – João Café Filho, 18th President of Brazil (b. 1899)

== See also ==
- 1970 in Brazilian football
- 1970 in Brazilian television
- List of Brazilian films of 1970
