= The Night of the Scarecrow =

1974 film

- Film poster
- Directed by: Sérgio Ricardo
- Written by: Maurice Capovila; Sérgio Ricardo
- Produced by: Otto Engel
- Starring: Geraldo Azevedo
- Cinematography: Dib Lutfi
- Release date: 1974
- Running time: 92 minutes
- Country: Brazil
- Language: Portuguese

The Night of the Scarecrow (Portuguese: A Noite do Espantalho) is a 1974 Brazilian drama film directed by Sérgio Ricardo. It was selected as the Brazilian entry for the Best Foreign Language Film at the 47th Academy Awards, but was not accepted as a nominee.

== Cast ==
- Geraldo Azevedo
- Fátima Batista
- Ana Lúcia Castro
- Emmanuel Cavalcanti as Colonel
- Luiz Gomes Correia
- Mário de Jacó
- Cláudia Furiati
- Geórgia Maria
- Rejane Medeiros
- Jorge Mello
- Tereza Mello

== See also ==
- List of submissions to the 47th Academy Awards for Best Foreign Language Film
- List of Brazilian submissions for the Academy Award for Best Foreign Language Film
