= Ana Terra =

1971 film directed by Durval Gomes Garcia

- Directed by: Durval Garcia
- Written by: Pereira Dias; Durval Garcia; Erico Verissimo (novel O Tempo e o Vento)
- Produced by: Durval Garcia
- Starring: Rossana Ghessa; Geraldo Del Rey; Pereira Dias; Naide Ribas
- Cinematography: Hélio Silva
- Edited by: Carlos Coimbra
- Music by: Carlos Castilho
- Release date: 1971
- Running time: 100 minutes
- Country: Brazil
- Language: Portuguese

Ana Terra is a Brazilian film, produced in 1971 and directed for Durval Garcia.

== Cast ==
- Rossana Ghessa - Ana Terra
- Geraldo Del Rey - Pedro Missioneiro
- Pereira Dias - Manuel Terra
- Vânia Elisabeth - Henriqueta
- Naide Ribas - Antonio
- Antonio Augusto Fernandes - Horácio
- Rejane Schumann - Eulália
- Carlos Castilhos - Major Bandeira
- Pedro Machado - chefe dos bandoleiros
- Antonio Augusto Fagundes Filho - Pedrinho
- Gilberto Nascimento
- Alexandre Ostrovski
- Augusta Jaeger
- Maximiliano Bogo
