= OSS 117 Takes a Vacation =

1970 film directed by Pierre Kalfon

- Original film poster
- Directed by: Pierre Kalfon
- Screenplay by: Josette Bruce; Pierre Kalfon; Pierre Phillipe (dialogue)
- Produced by: Georges Chappedelaine; Pierre Kalfon; Walter Hugo Khouri; William Khouri
- Starring: Luc Merenda
- Cinematography: Étienne Becker
- Music by: André Borly; Rogerio Duprat
- Distributed by: Metro-Goldwyn-Mayer
- Release date: 4 February 1970
- Running time: 92 minutes
- Country: France
- Language: French

OSS 117 takes a vacation/Hot Holidays for OSS 117/OSS 117 prend des vacances is a French/Brazilian international co-production 1970 spy film directed by Pierre Kalfon who also co-wrote and co-produced the film. It starred Luc Merenda, Edwige Feuillère and Elsa Martinelli. The film is one of the OSS 117 series of films, and was based on the 1968 novel Vacances Pour OSS 117 by Josette Bruce the widow of Jean Bruce who also co-wrote the film. The film was shot in Guarujá.

== Plot ==
OSS 117 goes on vacation to Brazil, but is called into action when he finds himself being stalked by a double.

== Production ==
The film was the result of an agreement between Pierre Kalfon and Walter Hugo Khouri. Kalfon directed and Khouri produced the OSS 117 film whilst Khouri directed and Kalfron produced Khouri's The Palace of Angels that also featured Luc Merenda, Norma Bengell and Geneviève Grad.

Male model Luc Merenda made his debut in the film, at which time he was originally signed for five films, but he never returned to the role.

== Cast ==
- Luc Merenda ... Hubert Bonisseur de La Bath, alias OSS 117
- Edwige Feuillère ... Comtesse de Labarthe
- Elsa Martinelli ... Elsa
- Geneviève Grad ... Paulette Balestri
- Norma Bengell ... Anne
- Ivan Roberto
- Rossana Ghessa ... Anna
- Sérgio Hingst ... Santovski
- Tarcísio Meira ... Killer
- Jess Morgane ... Balestri
- Yann Arthus-Bertrand ... Yann
- Jorge Luis Costa ... Flavio
- Almir de Freitas ... Joao
- Vittorio Rubello ... Marcello
