= The Hour and Turn of Augusto Matraga =

1965 film

- Theatrical release poster
- Directed by: Roberto Santos
- Written by: Roberto Santos
- Based on: "A Hora e Vez de Augusto Matraga" by João Guimarães Rosa
- Produced by: Luis Carlos Barreto
- Starring: Leonardo Villar; Joffre Soares; Maria Ribeiro; Maurício do Valle
- Cinematography: Hélio Silva
- Edited by: Silvio Renoldi
- Music by: Geraldo Vandré
- Production company: Luis Carlos Barreto Produções
- Distributed by: Difilm; Embrafilme; Polifilmes
- Release dates: 1965 (Festival de Brasília); 9 March 1966
- Running time: 109 minutes
- Country: Brazil
- Language: Portuguese

The Hour and Turn of Augusto Matraga (Portuguese: A Hora e Vez de Augusto Matraga) is a 1965 Brazilian crime drama film directed by Roberto Santos, based on the short story of the same name by João Guimarães Rosa.

== Cast ==
- Leonardo Villar as Augusto Matraga
- Joffre Soares as Joaozinho Bem Bem
- Maria Ribeiro as Dionorá
- Maurício do Valle as Priest
- Flávio Migliaccio as Quim Recadeiro
- Solano Trindade
- Antonio Carnera as Major Consilvo
- Ivan De Souza as Jurumim
- Emmanuel Cavalcanti as João Lomba

== Reception ==
The film won the Best Film Award and Leonardo Villar won the Best Actor Award at the 1st Festival de Brasília. It was entered into the 1966 Cannes Film Festival.
