= João Antônio (journalist) =

Brazilian journalist and short story writer

João Antônio Ferreira Filho (January 27, 1937 – October 31, 1996) was a Brazilian journalist and short story writer, who became known for portraying the lives of marginalized people inhabiting the outskirts of large cities, such as bandits, workers, vagrants and malandros.

== Biography ==
Born into a family of small shopkeepers in Osasco (then a suburb of São Paulo), João Antônio worked in low-paid jobs before releasing his first collection of short stories, Malagueta, Perus e Bacanaço, in 1963, for which he won several awards: two Jabuti Prizes (best new author and best book of short stories), the Prêmio Fabio Prado and the Prêmio Municipal da Cidade de São Paulo. The double Jabuti award was an unprecedented feat for a rookie writer. Malagueta was originally written in 1960, but the manuscript was destroyed in a fire. Antonio then spent the following two years rewriting it.

This literary success led him into a career in journalism, his first job being with the Jornal do Brasil. He was a member of the founding team of Realidade magazine (1966), which published the first short story of Brazilian journalism, Um Dia No Cais (1968). He subsequently worked for Manchete magazine, the newspaper O Pasquim and various alternative press outlets, opposing the military regime in Brazil. During this period, João Antonio alternated residence between Rio de Janeiro and São Paulo.

In 1967, he married Marilia Mendonça Andrade; his only son, Daniel Pedro, was born in the same year. In the late 1960s he decided to radically change his life. He quit his job, sold his car, left his wife and began to devote himself entirely to literature.

Antônio wrote fifteen books in total, but he always refused to participate in ceremonies and to join groups and literary academies, only accepting invitations to speak at schools and universities. He traveled throughout Brazil in 1978 and Europe in 1985. In 1987 he was awarded a scholarship and settled in Germany, where he remained until 1989. During this period, he also visited the Netherlands and Poland, holding numerous conferences.

Antônio died alone in 1996, in Rio de Janeiro, his body only being discovered fifteen days after his death. His collected archives were donated by his family and are housed in the CEDAP (Centro de Documentação e Pesquisa-Center of Documentation and Research) at the São Paulo State University campus in Assis.

== Works ==
- 1963: Malagueta, Perus e Bacanaço
- 1975: Leão-de-chácara
- 1975: Malhação do Judas carioca
- 1976: Casa de Loucos
- 1977: Lambões de Caçarola (Trabalhadores do Brasil!)
- 1977: Calvário e Porres do Pingente Afonso Henriques de Lima Barreto
- 1978: Ô Copacabana!
- 1982: Dedo-duro
- 1984: Meninão do caixote (coletânea)
- 1986: Abraçado ao meu rancor
- 1991: Zicartola e que tudo mais vá pro inferno! (Editora Scipione)
- 1992: Guardador
- 1993: Um herói sem paradeiro
- 1996: Patuléia
- 1996: Sete vezes rua (Editora Scipione)
- 1996: Dama do Encantado

== Adaptations to other media ==
In 1977, the title story of Malagueta, Perus e Bacanaço, about three pool players from the underground of São Paulo, was turned into a film called O Jogo da Vida, directed by Maurice Capovila and starring Lima Duarte.
