= Supergirl – Das Mädchen von den Sternen =

- Written by: Max Zihlmann
- Directed by: Rudolf Thome
- Starring: Iris Berben, Charly Seibert, Elsa Morandi
- Music by: Patrick Moraz
- Country of origin: Germany
- Original language: German

Production
- Editor: Jane Sperr

Original release
- Release: 1971

Supergirl – Das Mädchen von den Sternen is (translation: "The Girl from the Stars") 1971 German television film directed by Rudolf Thome and written by Max Zihlmann. It has no connection with the comic book character Supergirl. The music was written and played by Patrick Moraz.

== Cast ==
- Iris Berben - Supergirl/Francesca Farnese
- Marquard Bohm - Evers
- Nikolaus Dutsch - Charly Seibert
- Karin Thome - Elsa Morandi
- Jess Hahn - Polonsky
- Rainer Werner Fassbinder - Cameo appearance
- Affonso Beato - Mann vom anderen Stern
- Hans Weth - Barmann
- Monique Marshall - Mädchen an der Bar
- Carlos Bustamante - Polonsky's assistant
- Isolde Jovine - Jackie
- Klaus Lemke - American director
- Peter Moland - Detective Phil
- Billy Kearns - Himself
- Eddie Constantine - Party guest
