= Solidão, Uma Linda História de Amor =

1989 film directed by Victor di Mello

Solidão, uma linda história de amor is a Brazilian movie from 1989, directed by Victor Di Mello, with production executive, Carlo Mossy, and script by Victor Di Mello and Avelino Dias dos Santos.

== Cast ==
- José Wilker
- Roberto Bonfim
- Stênio Garcia
- Tarcísio Meira
- David Cardoso
- Maitê Proença
- Simone Carvalho
- Magda Cotrofe
- Luma de Oliveira
- Ibanez Filho
- Vera Gimenez
- Paulo Goulart
- Lutero Luiz
- Nuno Leal Maia
- Carlo Mossy
- Pelé
- Rogério Samora
- Cléa Simões
- Luciana Vendramini
- Humberto Catalano
- Marcella Prado

== See also ==
- Brazilian films of the 1980s
