= A Ilha dos Prazeres Proibidos =

- Directed by: Carlos Reichenbach
- Written by: Carlos Reichenbach
- Starring: Neide Ribeiro; Roberto Miranda; Meiry Vieira; Fernando Benini
- Music by: Roberto Polo Galante
- Production companies: Produções Cinematográficas Galante; Ouro Nacional Distribuidora de Filmes
- Distributed by: Ouro Importadora e Distribuidora de Filmes; Seleção Ouro; Art Films
- Release date: 15 January 1979
- Running time: 95 minutes
- Country: Brazil
- Language: Portuguese

A Ilha dos Prazeres Proibidos is a 1979 Brazilian erotic thriller drama film directed by Carlos Reichenbach. The film tells the story of Ana Medeiros, an agent of a far-right organization who is tasked with killing two fugitive revolutionaries living on an erotic island, posing as a journalist. However, a web of complex relationships and peculiar characters ends up jeopardizing Ana's mission. It was Carlos Reichenbach's biggest box office success, attracting 4 million viewers to theaters.

== Plot ==
Ana Medeiros is a false journalist, hired by a far-right organization. Under the pretext of conducting a report on individuals with a price on their heads, she travels to a paradisiacal island, which serves as a kind of haven for sexual liberation. Her mission is to eliminate two intellectuals deemed subversive who are staying there: the Reichian theoretician William, who shares his wife, Lucia with Sérgio and the anarchist Nilo who lives with two sisters, Brigite and Monique in a tent at the seaside. On the island, she receives assistance from the unsuspecting Sérgio, who genuinely believes Ana is a journalist. However, a web of complex relationships and peculiar characters ultimately jeopardizes her task.

== Cast ==
- Neide Ribeiro as Ana Medeiros
- Roberto Miranda as Sérgio Lacerda
- Carlos Casan as William Solanas
- Meiry Vieira as Lucia Solanas
- Fernando Benini as Nilo Baleeiro
- Zilda Mayo as Monique
- Fátima Porto as Brigite
- Teca as Lua
- Olindo Dias as Luc Mollet
- Alfio as border guard
- João Maia Neto as gangster
- Ligia Reichenbach as doctor

== Reception ==
According to Marcelo Müller, from the website Papo de Cinema, A Ilha dos Prazeres Proibidos is "an allegory in which repression is contrasted with libertarian ideals", filmed under the military dictatorship. In the plot, the assassin Ana is sent to eliminate two intellectuals "deemed subversive" on an island marked by "sexual permissiveness", a setting where "sex and violence alternate as the main driving force of the narrative". In this context, nudity is "offered as symbolic potency", and the island serves as a space of contestation, where "the freedom advocated by its inhabitants […] begins to contaminate the assassin, gradually softening her once rigid conviction". For Müller, Reichenbach transforms production limitations into "narrative value" and makes the film a "political and social manifesto" in which "erotic energy is always high" and libido is treated as a "categorical manifestation of subjectivity", reinforcing a critique of the authoritarianism and repressive morality of the time.

According to critic Giulia Dela Pace, from the website Vertentes do Cinema, A Ilha dos Prazeres Proibidos is a politically subversive film that uses eroticism and metaphor to critique fascism and capitalism. She argues that Reichenbach disguises anti-fascist messages "as love and pornographic stories," using desire and sexual liberation to reconfigure social rules and expose repression. The protagonist Ana, a far-right assassin, ultimately succumbs to the island’s atmosphere of freedom, illustrating how authoritarian systems discard individuals "like any pawn of a large capitalist system." Dela Pace interprets the film as a “powerful political and social manifesto” that, despite production constraints, creatively champions political, ideological, and sexual freedom.
