= Geraldo Del Rey =

Brazilian actor (1930–1993)

- Born: Geraldo Del Rey Silva; 29 October 1930; Ilhéus, Bahia, Brazil
- Died: 25 April 1993 (aged 62); São Paulo, Brazil
- Occupation: Actor
- Years active: 1950 – 1992

Geraldo Del Rey (Brazilian Portuguese: [ʒeˈɾawdu dew ˈʁej]; 29 October 1930 – 25 April 1993) was a Brazilian actor. He appeared in 65 films and television shows between 1950 and 1992.

== Filmography ==
Year 1990	Title Lua Cheia de Amor	Role Túlio	Notes "Mágico"/Namorado/Noivo/Amor da protagonista "Genuina"
1950	Somos Dois		
1959	Redenção	Newton	
1960	Bahia de Todos os Santos		
1961	A Grande Feira	Ronny	
1962	O Pagador de Promessas	Bonitão / Handsome	
1962	Tocaia no Asfalto	Deputy Ciro	
1963	Sol Sobre a Lama		
1964	Lampião, O Rei do Cangaço		
1964	Black God, White Devil	Manuel	
1965	Menino de Engenho	Juca	
1965	Entre Amor e O Cangaço		
1966	Mudar de Vida	Adelino	
1966	Cristo de Lama	Aleijadinho	
1967	O Santo Milagroso	Dito	
1967	O Vigilante em Missão Secreta		
1968	Bebel, Garota Propaganda	Marcelo	
1970	Um Uísque Antes, Um Cigarro Depois	João	(segment "......")
1970	Anjos e Demônios	Henrique	
1971	Ana Terra	Pedro	
1973	Um Homem Tem Que Ser Morto		
1975	A Carne		
1975	Núpcias Vermelhas	Carlos	
1980	The Age of the Earth	Revolutionary Christ	
1980	Asa Branca: Um Sonho Brasileiro		
1984	Garota Dourada	Águia	
1988	Os Heróis Trapalhões: Uma Aventura na Selva	Rei	
1988	Dedé Mamata	Carlos Marighella	
