= The Prophet of Hunger =

1970 film

- Film poster
- Directed by: Maurice Capovila
- Written by: Maurice Capovila; Fernando Peixoto
- Produced by: Odécio Lopes dos Santos
- Starring: José Mojica Marins
- Cinematography: Jorge Bodanzky
- Edited by: Silvio Renoldi
- Music by: Rinaldo Rossi
- Production company: Fotograma Filmes
- Distributed by: Cinedistri
- Release date: 13 June 1970
- Running time: 93 minutes
- Country: Brazil
- Language: Portuguese

The Prophet of Hunger (Portuguese: O Profeta da Fome) is a 1970 Brazilian drama film directed by Maurice Capovila. It was entered into the 20th Berlin International Film Festival.

== Cast ==
- José Mojica Marins - Fakir Ali Khan
- Maurício do Valle - Lion Tamer
- Julia Miranda - Maria
- Sérgio Hingst - Dom José (circus owner)
- Joffre Soares - Priest
- Adauto Santos
- Eládio Brito
- Flávio Império
- Lenoir Bittencourt
- Mário Lima
- Angelo Mataran
- Luiz Abreu
- Jean-Claude Bernardet
- Hamilton de Almeida
