= A Arte de Amar Bem =

1970 film

- Directed by: Fernando de Barros
- Written by: Fernando de Barros; Roberto Freire
- Produced by: Fernando de Barros
- Starring: Eva Wilma; Raul Cortez; Otelo Zeloni
- Cinematography: Rudolf Icsey
- Edited by: Maximo Barro
- Music by: Rogerio Duprat
- Release date: 1970
- Running time: 90 minutes
- Country: Brazil
- Language: Portuguese

A Arte de Amar Bem (also known as A Arte de Amar... Bem) it is a Brazilian comedy film released in 1970, in three episodes, directed by Fernando de Barros.

== Plot theme ==
A sophisticated comedy movie Paulista, divided into three episodes taken from two pieces by Silveira Sampaio.

== Cast ==
- Eva Wilma
- Raul Cortez
- Otelo Zeloni
- Consuelo Leandro
- John Herbert
- Íris Bruzzi
- Newton Prado
- Luíza Di Franco
- Plínio Marcos
- Sérgio Hingst
- Wálter Forster
- Karin Rodrigues
- Durval de Souza
- Diná Lisboa
- Vera Lúcia
- Luely Figueiró
- Gilda Medeiros
