= Sérgio Hingst =

Brazilian actor

- Born: 27 November 1924; Sorocaba, São Paulo, Brazil
- Died: 7 November 2004 (aged 79); São Paulo, São Paulo, Brazil
- Occupation: Actor
- Years active: 1951–1984

Sérgio Hingst (1924 – 8 November 2004) was a Brazilian film actor. He appeared in more than 150 films during his career.

== Selected filmography ==
- Lights Out (1953)
- Sob o Céu da Bahia (1956)
- São Paulo, Sociedade Anônima (1965)
- Case of the Naves Brothers (1967)
- The Red Light Bandit (1968)
- A Arte de Amar Bem (1970)
- OSS 117 Takes a Vacation (1970)
- The Palace of Angels (1970)
- The Prophet of Hunger (1970)
- Independência ou Morte (1972)
- Histórias Que Nossas Babás não Contavam (1979)
- Os Trombadinhas (1980)
- Onda Nova (1983)
