= Rossana Ghessa =

Italian actress

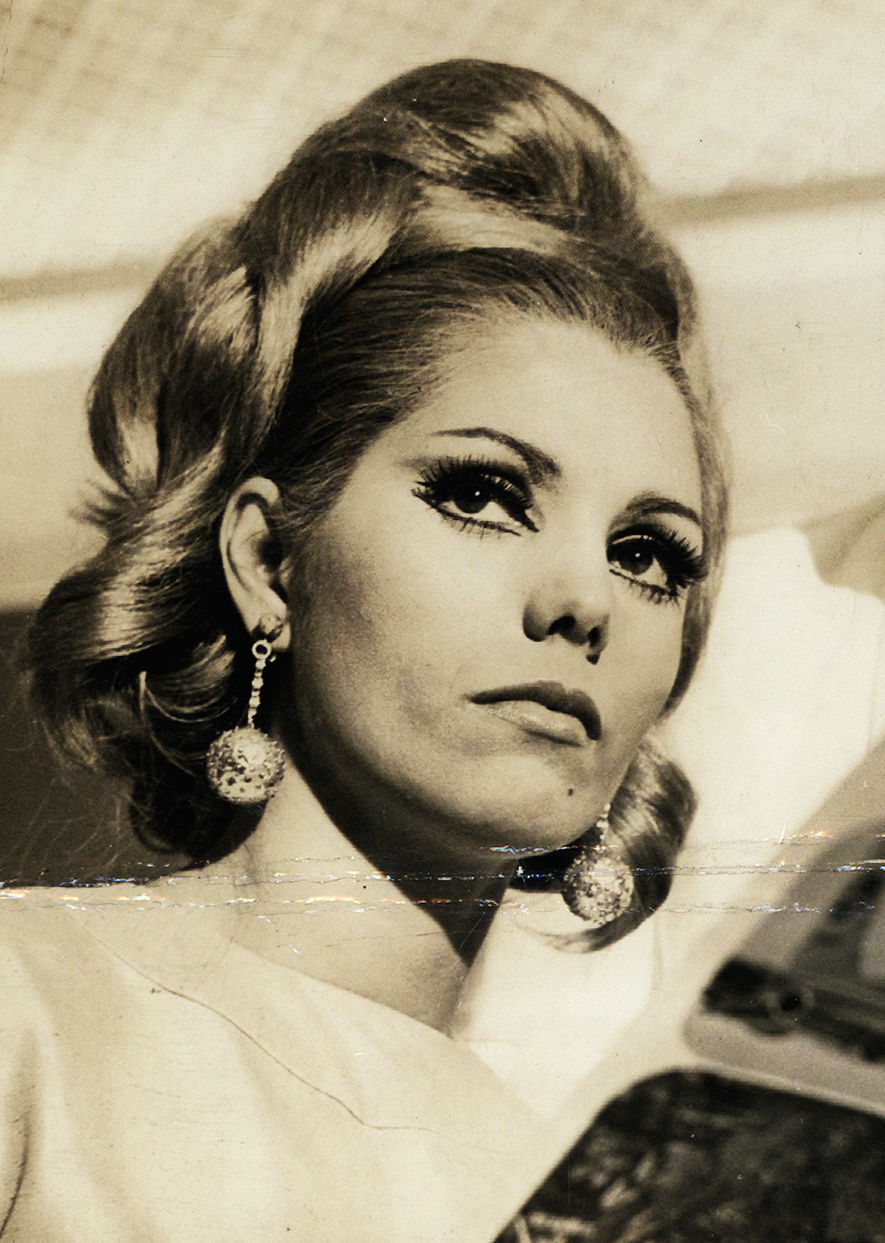
- Born: 24 January 1943 (age 83); Carbonia, Italy
- Occupation: Actor
- Years active: 1966–1996

Rossana Ghessa (born 24 January 1943) is an Italian actress, from Sardinia, and a naturalized Brazilian. She appeared in 43 films between 1966 and 1996.

== Selected filmography ==
- OSS 117 Takes a Vacation (1970)
- The Palace of Angels (1970)
- Ana Terra (1971)
