= Victor di Mello =

Brazilian actor, film director and screenwriter (1940–2011)

Victor di Mello (July 18, 1940 – April 27, 2011) was a Brazilian actor, film director and screenwriter born in Rio de Janeiro, Brazil.

== Filmography ==
=== As director ===
- 1989 - Solidão, Uma Linda História de Amor
- 1981 - O Sequestro
- 1980 - Giselle
- 1979 - Copa 78 - O Poder do Futebol
- 1978 - Assim Era a Pornochanchada
- 1978 - Os Melhores Momentos da Pornochanchada
- 1977 - A Mulata Que Queria Pecar
- 1976 - As Desquitadas em Lua de Mel
- 1974 - Essa Gostosa Brincadeira a Dois
- 1974 - Um Varão entre as Mulheres
- 1973 - Como É Boa a Nossa Empregada
- 1972 - O Grande Gozador
- 1971 - Quando as Mulheres Paqueram
- 1970 - Ascensão e Queda de um Paquera
- 1970 - Os Maridos Traem... as Mulheres Subtraem

=== As actor ===
==== In cinema ====
- 1975 - Os Maniacos Eróticos (from Alberto Salvá)
- 1975 - O Padre Que Queria Pecar (from Lenine Otoni)
- 1972 - Revólveres Não Cospem Flores (from Alberto Salvá)
- 1968 - A Noite do Meu Bem (from Jece Valadão)
- 1968 - A Doce Mulher Amada (from Ruy Santos)
- 1968 - Engraçadinha Depois dos Trinta (from J. B. Tanko)

==== In tv ====
- 2007 - O Profeta .... Genaro
- 2006 - Belíssima .... Humberto Moraes
