= Roberto Santos =

Brazilian film director

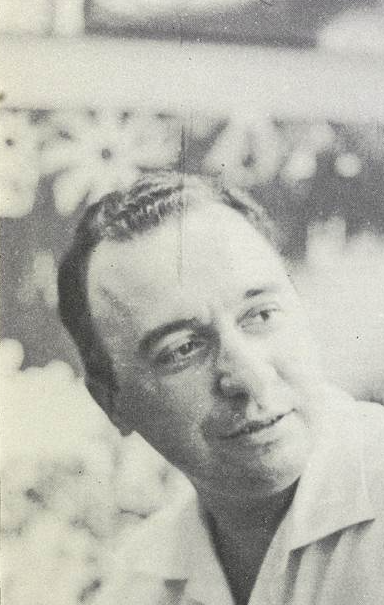
- Born: 1928; São Paulo, Brazil
- Died: 1987 (aged 58–59); São Paulo, Brazil
- Occupation: Film director
- Known for: Matraga

Roberto Santos Pinhanez (1928–1987) was a Brazilian film director, known for films like Matraga (A Hora e Vez de Augusto Matraga) and The Great Moment (O Grande Momento).

== Biography ==
Santos was born in a working-class suburb of São Paulo in 1928. He started his cinema activities around 1952, in the first big studio built in Brazil, the Vera Cruz Studio. In 1956, Santos made his first movie, O Grande Momento (The Great Moment), the first neo-realistic movie made in Brazil. In 1965, Roberto Santos adapted a short novel by Guimaraes Rosa, A Hora e Vez de Augusto Matraga (Matraga), the only successful adaptation to cinema of a work by Guimaraes Rosa, the most important name in Brazilian literature in this century. The film was shown at the 1966 Cannes Film Festival.

During the late 1960s and 1970s, his career was marked by problems with censorship. Nevertheless, he directed six more movies, among them, two experimental movies; Vozes do Medo (Voices of Fear) — a movie with the structure of a magazine — and As Tres Mortes de Solano (The Three Deaths of Solano), an experiment where the same plot is told three times, first in the fantastic realm, then as a realistic plot, and finally as a circus pantomime. Meanwhile, he worked in television and directed commercials. The success of an adaptation for TV of another Guimaraes Rosa's story prompted him to write a screenplay for the short novel Campo Geral, about a kid growing in the back-country of Brazil. After months of trouble to obtain the rights, the project was abandoned, and he decided to tackle another myth of Brazilian literature, Machado de Assis.

His last movie, Quincas Borba, recreated Machado de Assis's fin-de-siecle universe in the troubled 1980s. Roberto Santos died of a heart attack at the São Paulo airport in 1987, just after returning from the Festival of Gramado, where Quincas Borba was shown and heavily criticized by a clique of critics.

== Filmography ==
- O Grande Momento (1958)
  - a.k.a. The Grand Moment (International: English title)
- A Hora e a Vez de Augusto Matraga (1965)
  - a.k.a. Matraga
  - a.k.a. The Hour and Turn of Augusto Matraga (USA)
- As Cariocas (1966)
- O Homem Nu (1968)
  - a.k.a. The Naked Man
- Um Anjo Mau (1971)
  - a.k.a. The Evil Angel
- Vozes do Medo (1972)
- Contos Eróticos (1977) (segment "Arroz com Feijão")
  - a.k.a. Erotic Stories (International: English title)
- As Três Mortes de Solano (1978)
- Os Amantes da Chuva (1979)
- Nasce Uma Mulher (1983)
- Quincas Borba (1987)
