= Maria Morena (actress) =

Brazilian actress

- Born: Lea Castello; 20 February 1929; Rio de Janeiro, Brazil
- Died: 22 February 2003 (aged 74)
- Occupation: Actress

Maria Morena (20 February 1929 – 22 February 2003) was active in theater and film from 1950 to 1962. Among her accomplishments as an actress, she starred in the Brazilian adventure film Sob o Céu da Bahia, directed by Ernesto Remani, which was selected for entry into the 9th Cannes Film Festival in 1956. Casting photos of her can be accessed through the website of Brazil’s Banco de Conteúdos Culturais.

Maria Morena was born Lea Castello in Rio de Janeiro. She married Willison Norman Barnett in Baltimore, MD in 1952. Lea Castello Barnett was also a famed sculptor; her artist name was "Lotiz". Presently some of her work is presented at the Museu Afro Brasil in Parque Ibirapuera, São Paulo, Brazil.
