= Carlos Reichenbach =

Brazilian filmmaker

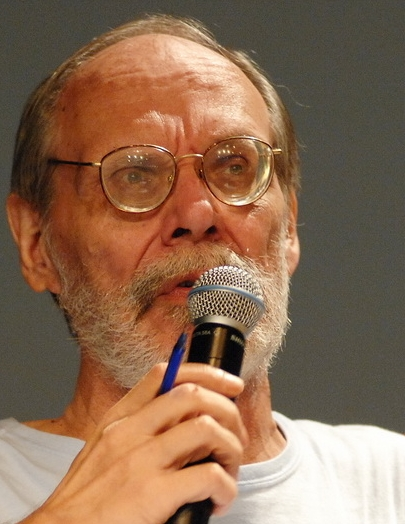
- Reichenbach in March 2009 at a press conference in Rio de Janeiro
- Born: 14 June 1945; Porto Alegre, Rio Grande do Sul, Brazil
- Died: 14 June 2012 (aged 67); São Paulo, Brazil
- Resting place: Cemiterio de Redemptor, São Paulo, Brazil
- Education: The School of Cinema São Luiz
- Occupation: Filmmaker
- Years active: 1965 – 2012

Carlos Oscar Reichenbach Filho (14 June 1945 – 14 June 2012) was a Brazilian filmmaker.

== Early life and career ==
Reichenbach was born in Porto Alegre to Luise Reichenbach (née Tinger) and Carlos Reichenbach. Reichenbach was one year of age when he came to live in São Paulo. He studied in the School of Cinema São Luiz, where he was a student of Luis Sérgio Person. With João Callegaro and Antonio Lima he made his first feature-length films – the film episodes of As Libertinas (1968) and Audácia, a fúria dos desejos (1969).

== Death ==
Reichenbach died on his 67th birthday from heart failure while being taken to a São Paulo hospital. Reichenbach is buried at Cemiterio de Redemptor in São Paulo.

== Selected filmography ==
=== Writer ===
- So This Augusta Street (1967)
- The Voluptuous (1968)
- As Libertinas (1968)
- Audácia, a fúria dos desejos (1969)
- Audácia (1970)
- Race in Search of Love (1972)
- The Guru and Gurls (1973)
- Lillian M: Confidential Report (1974)
- Sede de Amar (1977)
- A Ilha dos Prazeres Proibidos (1978)
- Love, Word Prostitute (1980)
- Dream of Life (1980)
- Blood Corsair (1980)
- The Empire of Desire (1981)
- Forbidden Paradise (1981)
- The Safadas (1982)
- Extreme Pleasure (1984)
- Movie Dementia (1985)
- Anjos do Arrabalde (1986)
- City Life (1990)
- Soul Corsair (1993)
- Look and Feel (1994)
- Two Streams (1999)
- Balance & Grace (2003)
- Girls ABC (2004)
- Confiscated Goods (2005)
- Fake Blonde (2007)
- Start a History (2010)

=== Actor ===
- The Red Light Bandit (1968) - Gangster
- Sertão em Festa (1970)
- Ritual dos Sádicos (1970)
- O Pornógrafo (1970)
- The End of Man (1971)
- Os Amores de Um Cafona (1971)
- No Rancho Fundo (1971)
- O Jeca e o Bode (1972)
- Gringo, o Último Matador (1972)
- Corrida em Busca do Amor (1972) - Ivan
- Ainda Agarro Esse Machão (1975)
- A Casa das Tentações (1975)
- O Vampiro da Cinemateca (1977)
- Noite em Chamas (1977)
- Belas e Corrompidas (1977)
- A Mulher Que Inventou o Amor (1979)
- Extremos do Prazer (1984)
- Filme Demência (1986) - Man In The Public Piss House
- O Corpo (1991)
- Girls ABC (2004)
- Avanti Popolo (2012) - The Father (final film orle)
