= Vera Valdez =

Brazilian model (1936–2026)

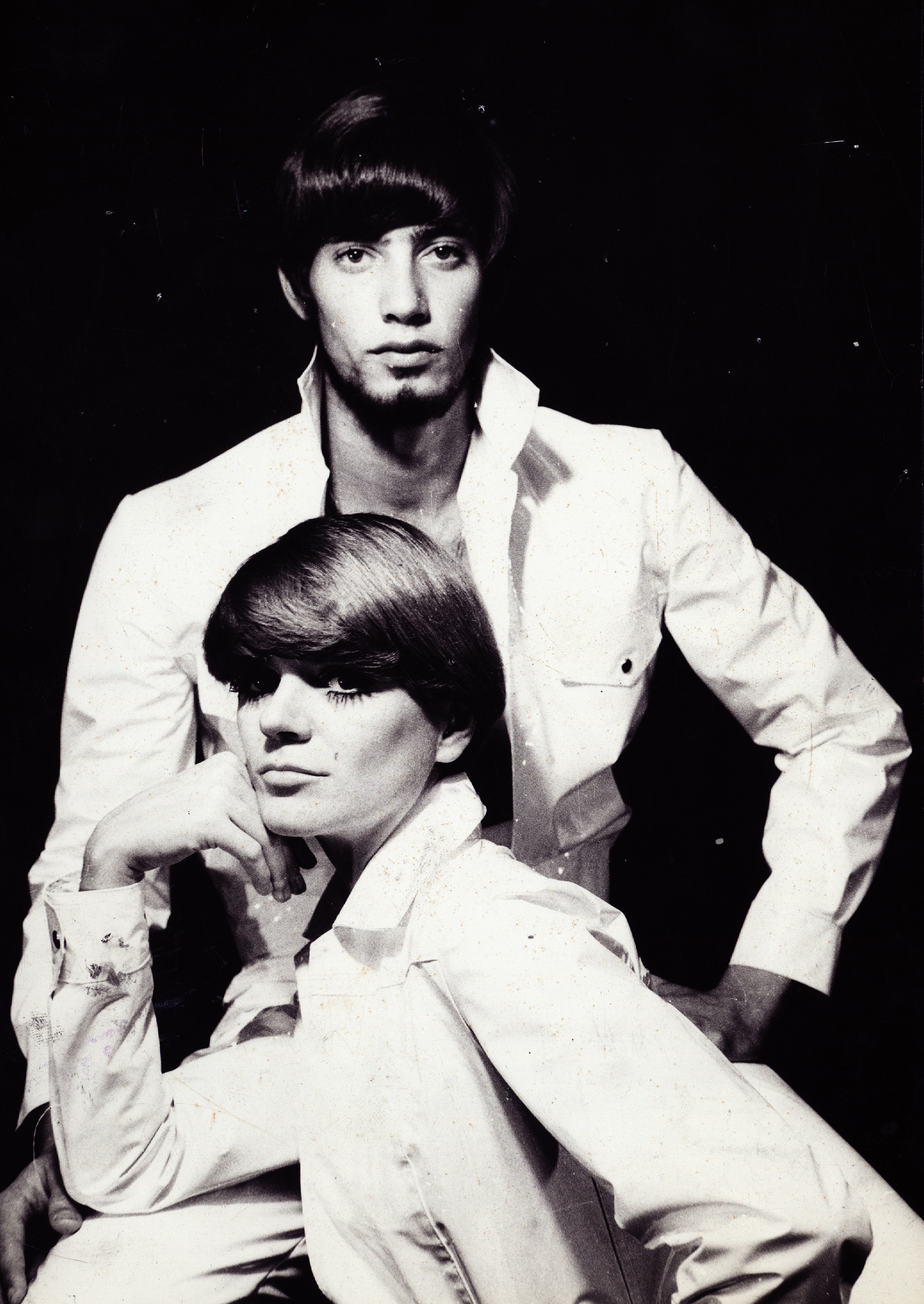
- Born: Vera Barreto Leite; 27 May 1936; Rio de Janeiro, Brazil
- Died: 14 January 2026 (aged 89); São Paulo, Brazil
- Occupations: Model, actress

Vera Barreto Leite (27 May 1936 – 14 January 2026), better known as Vera Valdez, was a Brazilian model and actress.

Valdez spent much of her career in France, modelling for Dior and Chanel. In 2008, she attracted attention due to her striptease for the Brazilian magazine Trip.

Vera Valdez died on 14 January 2026, at the age of 89.
