= Entranced Earth =

1967 film

- DVD cover
- Directed by: Glauber Rocha
- Written by: Glauber Rocha
- Produced by: Zelito Viana
- Starring: Jardel Filho; Paulo Autran; José Lewgoy; Glauce Rocha; Paulo Gracindo
- Cinematography: Luiz Carlos Barreto
- Edited by: Eduardo Escorel
- Music by: Sérgio Ricardo
- Production company: Mapa Filmes
- Distributed by: Difilm
- Release dates: 3 May 1967 (Cannes); 29 May 1967 (Brazil)
- Running time: 106 minutes
- Country: Brazil
- Language: Brazilian Portuguese

Entranced Earth (Portuguese: Terra em Transe [ˈtɛʁɐ ẽj ˈtɾɐ̃zi], "World in a Trance", also called Land in Anguish or Earth Entranced) is a 1967 Brazilian Cinema Novo drama film directed by Glauber Rocha. It was shot in Parque Lage and at the Municipal Theatre of Rio de Janeiro. The film is an allegory for the history of Brazil in the period 1960–1966.

== Plot ==
The story is told in flashback by a writer who explains how he got into his present situation. He had been supporting a conservative party leader, but then decided to support the liberal candidate. The liberal wins the election, but soon reneges upon his campaign promises. The disillusioned writer decides to stay out of politics and resume his writing. Unfortunately, his girlfriend convinces him to try to talk the country's leader into pursuing a particular direction. The writer is soon shot.

In the Republic of Eldorado, Paulo Martins is an idealist journalist and poet linked to the rising conservative politician and technocrat Porfírio Diaz and his mistress, Sílvia, with whom they form a love triangle. When Diaz is elected senator, Paulo moves away and goes to the province of Alecrim, where he associates with the activist Sara. Together they resolve to support the populist alderman Felipe Vieira for governor in an attempt to launch a new, supposedly progressive political leader who will guide the change of the situation of misery and injustice that plagues the country. After winning the election, Vieira appears weak and controlled by the local economic forces that financed him and does little to change the social situation, which leads Paulo, disillusioned, to leave Sara and return to the capital and meet Sílvia again. He approaches Júlio Fuentes, the country's biggest businessman, and tells him that President Fernandez has the economic support of a powerful multinational, EXPLINT (Company of International Exploitation), that wants to take control of the capital. When Diaz goes to the presidential race with the support of Fernandez, Fuentes' television channel supports Paulo, who uses it in order to attack Diaz. Vieira and Paulo join the presidential campaign again until Fuentes betrays them both and makes an agreement with Diaz. Paulo wants to start the armed struggle, but Vieira gives up.

== Cast ==
- Jardel Filho as Paulo Martins
- Paulo Autran as Porfirio Díaz
- José Lewgoy as Felipe Vieira
- Glauce Rocha as Sara
- Paulo Gracindo as Don Julio Fuentes
- Hugo Carvana as Alvaro
- Danuza Leão as Silvia
- Joffre Soares as Father Gil
- Modesto De Souza as Senator
- Mário Lago as Captain
- Flávio Migliaccio as Common people man
- Thelma Reston as Felício's wife
- José Marinho as Jerônimo
- Francisco Milani as Aldo
- Paulo César Peréio as Student

== Release and reception ==
Its exhibition was forbidden in Brazil in April 1967 for "tarnishing the image of Brazil" but after protests by both Brazilian and French filmmakers, it was authorized by the Brazilian government to be screened at Cannes and in Brazil. It debuted in the 1967 Cannes Film Festival where it won the FIPRESCI Award. It also won the Golden Leopard award at the Locarno International Film Festival in 1968.
