= Ascensão e Queda de um Paquera =

1970 film

Ascensão E Queda de um Paquera
- Directed by: Victor di Mello
- Written by: Alexandre Pires, Paulo Silvino (play)
- Produced by: João Bennio, Altamir Braga, Mauro V. Meira
- Starring: Cláudio Cavalcanti
- Cinematography: Afonso Viana
- Edited by: Raimundo Higino
- Music by: Antônio Adolfo, Tibério Gaspar
- Distributed by: Bennio Produções Cinematográficas, Ipanema Filmes, Condor Filmes
- Release date: 1970
- Running time: 85 minutes
- Country: Brazil
- Language: Portuguese

Ascensão e Queda de um Paquera is a 1970 Brazilian comedy film directed by Victor di Mello and starring Cláudio Cavalcanti.

== Cast ==
- Cláudio Cavalcanti
- Mário Benvenutti
- Dilma Lóes as Claudia
- Valentina Godoy
- Henriqueta Brieba
- Urbano Lóes
- Kleber Santos
- Monique Lafond
