= The Palace of Angels =

1970 film

- Theatrical release poster
- Directed by: Walter Hugo Khouri
- Written by: Walter Hugo Khouri
- Produced by: Walter Hugo Khouri; William Khouri
- Starring: Geneviève Grad
- Cinematography: Peter Overbeck
- Edited by: Mauro Alice
- Music by: Rogério Duprat; Lanny Gordini; Renato Mazola
- Production companies: Vera Cruz; Metro Goldwyn Mayer; Les Films Number One
- Distributed by: Metro Goldwyn Mayer
- Release date: 25 May 1970
- Running time: 96 minutes
- Countries: Brazil; France
- Language: Portuguese

The Palace of Angels (Portuguese: O Palácio dos Anjos; French: Le palais des anges) is a 1970 Brazilian-French drama film directed by Walter Hugo Khouri. It was selected to compete for the Palme d'Or at the 1970 Cannes Film Festival.

== Plot ==
Bárbara is a French woman who lives in São Paulo and, with two other friends, decides to transform her apartment into a luxurious brothel (title of the film), which brings her money and prestige, but also many emotional problems.

== Cast ==
- Geneviève Grad as Bárbara
- Adriana Prieto as Ana Lúcia
- Rossana Ghessa as Mariazinha
- Luc Merenda as Ricardo
- Norma Bengell as Dorothy
- Joana Fomm as Rose
- John Herbert as Carlos Eduardo
- Alberto Ruschel as José Roberto
- Sérgio Hingst as Mr. Strauss
- Pedro Paulo Hatheyer as Dr. Luiz
- Zózimo Bulbul as Senegal's ambassador
