= Maurício do Valle =

Brazilian actor (1928–1994)

- Born: 1 March 1928; Rio de Janeiro, Brazil
- Died: 7 October 1994 (aged 66); Rio de Janeiro, Brazil
- Occupation: Actor
- Years active: 1952–1994

Maurício do Valle (Brazilian Portuguese: [mawˈɾisi.u du ˈvali]; 1 March 1928 – 7 October 1994) was a Brazilian film actor. He appeared in 70 films between 1952 and 1994. He is also known for his roles in several Brazilian TV series, such as Rede Globo's Roque Santeiro (1985), and even for his role of secondary actor in the series Os Trapalhões, as well as in some films of this group.

== Selected filmography ==
- Tudo Azul (1952) – (uncredited)
- Na Senda do Crime (1954) – (uncredited)
- Além do Rios das Mortes (1958)
- Briga, Mulher e Samba (1960) – Zé
- O Homem Que Roubou a Copa do Mundo (1961)
- Terra Sem Deus (1963)
- Boca de Ouro (1963)
- Black God, White Devil (1964) – Antônio das Mortes
- Selva Trágica (1964) – Isaac
- História de um Crápula (1965)
- Grande Sertão (1965) – Riobaldo
- The Hour and Turn of Augusto Matraga (1965) – Priest
- Riacho do Sangue (1966) – Floro Pereira
- Terra em Transe (1967) – Security guard
- Cangaceiros de Lampião (1967) – Carcara
- O Jeca e a Freira (1968) – Seu Pedro
- Bebel, Garota Propaganda (1968) – Renatão
- O Dragão da Maldade Contra o Santo Guerreiro (1969) – Antonio das Mortes, the Jagunço / Killer
- Sete Homens Vivos ou Mortos (1969)
- O Cangaceiro Sem Deus (1969)
- O Cangaceiro Sanguinário (1969) – Capitão / Captain Jagunço
- Corisco, O Diabo Loiro (1969) – Corisco
- The Prophet of Hunger (1970) – Lion Tamer
- Pindorama (1970) – D. Sebastião de Souza
- A Vingança Dos Doze (1970) – Carlão
- Audácia (1970)
- As Gatinhas (1970) – Man with Beard
- O Marginal (1974) – Sapo
- A Cartomante (1974)
- Pecado na Sacristia (1975) – Ferrolho Feitosa
- O Roubo das Calcinhas (1975) – Manuel – Segment 2 – Filó s husband
- O Dia em Que o Santo Pecou (1975) – João Baleia
- Kung Fu Contra as Bonecas (1975)
- Bacalhau (1976) – Quico
- Crueldade Mortal (1976) – Tranca Rua
- Soledade, a Bagaceira (1976)
- Chão Bruto (1976) – Paulo
- As Meninas Querem... Os Coroas Podem (1976)
- O Jogo da Vida (1977)
- Anchieta, José do Brasil (1977)
- Os Cangaceiros do Vale da Morte (1978)
- O Cortiço (1978)
- Sábado Alucinante (1979) – Ivan
- O Coronel e o Lobisomem (1979)
- O Cinderelo Trapalhão (1979)
- O Caçador de Esmeraldas (1979) – Matias Cardoso
- Nos Tempos da Vaselina (1979)
- Mulheres do Cais (1979)
- Os Sete Gatinhos (1980) – Congressman
- Parceiros da Aventura (1980) – Soares
- A Idade da Terra (1980) – Brahms
- As Intimidades de Analu e Fernanda (1980)
- Rio Babilônia (1982)
- Curral de Mulheres (1982) – Edgar
- Profissão Mulher (1983) – Sérgio
- Gabriela, Cravo e Canela (1983) – Cel. Amâncio Leal
- Águia na Cabeça (1984)
- Quilombo (1984) – Dominingos Jorge Velho
- Os Trapalhões e o Mágico de Oróz (1984) – Colonel Fereira
- Os Trapalhões no Reino da Fantasia (1985)
- Chico Rei (1985) – Merchant
- Os Trapalhões e o Rei do futebol (1986) – Edésio
- Rastros na Areia (1988)
- Natal da Portela (1988)
- Better Days Ahead (1989) – Dono da Buchada
- O Grande Mentecapto (1989)
- Assim na Tela Como no Céu (1989)
