= Avanti Popolo (2012 film) =

2012 film directed by Michael Wahrmann

- Directed by: Michael Wahrmann
- Starring: André Gatti; Carlos Reichenbach; Eduardo Valente
- Cinematography: Rodrigo Pastoriza
- Edited by: Ricardo Alves Jr. Fellipe Barbosa
- Production companies: Dezenove Som e Imagem; FiGa Films; Sancho Filmes
- Distributed by: Vitrine Filmes
- Release dates: November 17, 2012 (Italy); January 27, 2013 (IFFR)
- Running time: 72 minutes
- Country: Brazil
- Language: Portuguese

Avanti Popolo is a 2012 Brazilian drama film directed by Michael Wahrmann. It was selected for the Rotterdam and Rome festivals in 2013, awarded for best film at the CinemaXXI competition.

The film mixes fiction and documentary, following the story of André Gatti, a researcher who rescues some Super 8 footage shot by his brother in 1970, while in the resistance against the dictatorship, trying to revive the memory of their father, who has been waiting for his missing son for the last 30 years.

== Cast ==
- André Gatti as André, the son
- Carlos Reichenbach as The Father
- Eduardo Valente as Taxi driver
- Marcos Bertoni as Super 8mm technician
- Paulo Rigazzi as Neighbour
- Mariah da Penha as Lady in bus station
- Júlio Martí as Missing son
- Michael Wahrmann as Radio presentation
- Estopinha as Baleia, the dog
