= Adriana Prieto =

Brazilian actress

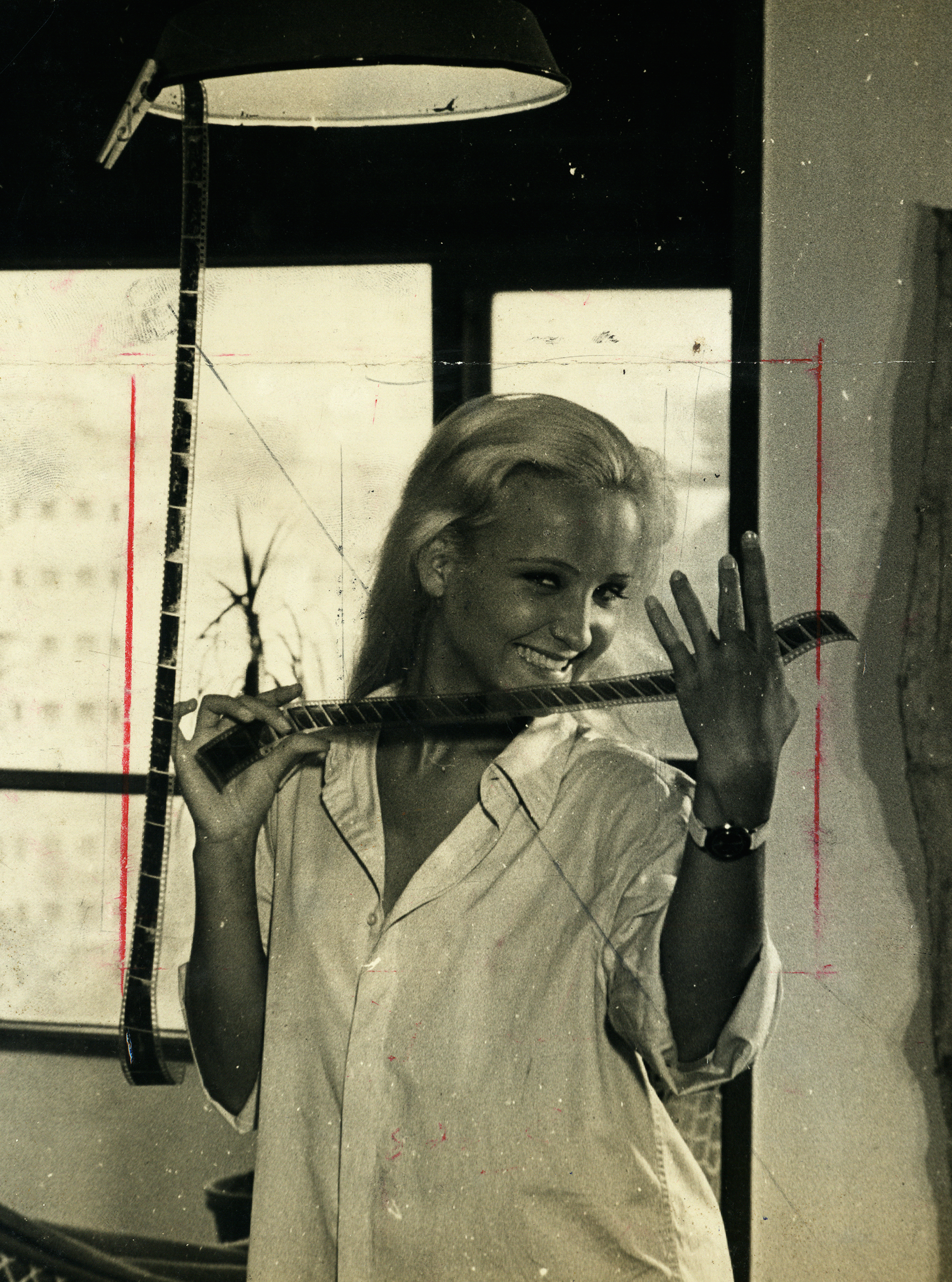
- Born: Adriana Inés Prieto Amarante; October 19, 1949; Buenos Aires, Argentina
- Died: December 24, 1974 (aged 25); Rio de Janeiro, Brazil
- Occupation: Actress
- Years active: 1966–1974

Adriana Inés Prieto Amarante (October 19, 1949 – December 24, 1974) was an Argentine-born Brazilian actress.

== Early life ==
Prieto was born in Buenos Aires, Argentina. Her mother was Brazilian and her father was a Chilean diplomat. In 1954, the family settled in Rio de Janeiro.

== Career ==
the film that brought Prieto fame was El Justicero (1966) by Nelson Pereira dos Santos, a satire of hypocritical morals of carioca bourgeoisie, which earned her the "Best Supporting Actress" award by the Governorship of Rio de Janeiro. On TV, her first appearance to a broader public was with A Rainha Louca, a telenovela of Rede Globo in 1967. The series was an adaptation of Mémoires d'un médecin: Joseph Balsamo by Alexandre Dumas. She also appeared in plays by notable playwrights such as Henrik Ibsen, Nélson Rodrigues, and Augusto Boal but she finally decided to pursue her career in cinema. Her 1969 film, A Penúltima Donzela, by Fernando Amaral and her 1971 film, Lúcia McCartney, Uma Garota de Programa, by David Neves were of particular success.

The turning point in her career was A Viúva Virgem (1972) by Pedro Carlos Rovai, which was conceived as a social satire but inevitably seen as a precursor of pornochanchada conventions. In this film, Prieto played the role of Cristina, a young girl who marries a powerful coronel from Minas Gerais but left as a "virgin widow" when her older husband dies on the wedding night. Her last film, O Casamento (1975), by Arnaldo Jabor was about the decadent bourgeoisie, a common theme in many other works of Nélson Rodrigues, accompanied by a story of incestuous love.

== Personal life ==
She died in a road accident when her Volkswagen Beetle was struck by a police car.
