= Maurice Capovilla =

Brazilian film director (1936–2021)

Maurice Capovila
- Born: 16 January 1936; Valinhos, Brazil
- Died: 29 May 2021 (aged 85); Rio de Janeiro, Brazil
- Occupations: Film director Screenwriter
- Years active: 1968–2003

Maurice Capovila (16 January 1936 – 29 May 2021) was a Brazilian film director and screenwriter. He directed eight films between 1968 and 2003. His 1970 film The Prophet of Hunger was entered into the 20th Berlin International Film Festival.

== Filmography ==
=== Director ===
- Brasil Verdade (1968)
- Bebel, Garota Propaganda (1968)
- The Prophet of Hunger (1970)
- Noites de Iemanjá (1971)
- Vozes do Medo (1972)
- The Night of the Scarecrow (1974)
- O Jogo da Vida (1977)
- O Boi Misterioso e o Vaqueiro Menino (1980)
- Harmada (2003)

=== Actor ===
- The Red Light Bandit (1968) - Gangster
- O Ritual dos Sádicos (1970)
- Audácia (1970) - (final film role)
