= Sérgio Ricardo (director) =

Brazilian film director

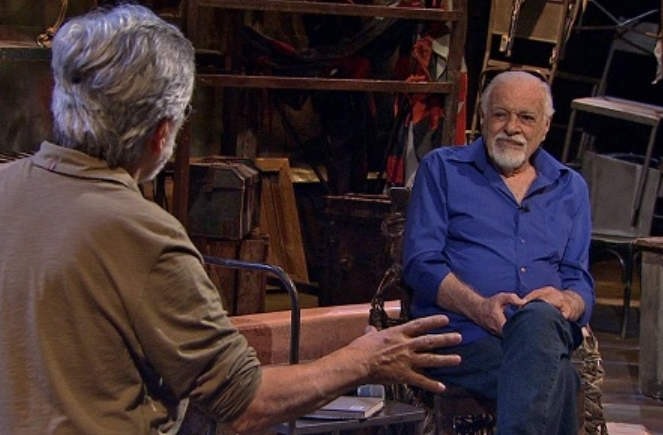
- Ricardo interviewed by TV Brasil in 2015
- Born: João Lutfi; June 18, 1932; Marília, São Paulo, Brazil
- Died: July 23, 2020 (aged 88); Rio de Janeiro, Rio de Janeiro, Brazil
- Occupations: Film director, composer
- Years active: 1964-2020

João Lutfi (18 June 1932 – 23 July 2020), known professionally as Sérgio Ricardo, was a Brazilian film director and composer. He directed five films between 1964 and 1974.

Born in the city of Marília, São Paulo, his father, Abdalla Lutfi, and mother, Maria Mansur, were both of Syrian descent. In 1967 he gained attention when taking part in the third Festival de Música Popular Brasileira, in which he performed a rearranged version of "Beto bom de bola". The audience disliked the fact that he would not perform the original version and booed him during the whole performance. At a certain moment, he gave up playing, shouted "You won!" at the audience, broke his acoustic guitar and threw it at the crowd. He was then immediately disqualified.

He was infected with COVID-19, and became COVID-negative in May 2020. However, he died without being discharged on 23 July 2020, a month after his 88th birthday, of heart failure.

== Selected filmography ==
- Boy of White Trousers (short, director, 1962)
- This World is Mine (director, 1964)
- Black God, White Devil (composer, 1964)
- Lost Love Juliana (director, 1970)
- The Night of the Scarecrow (director, 1974)
