= Glauber Rocha =

Brazilian film director, actor and writer (1939–1981)

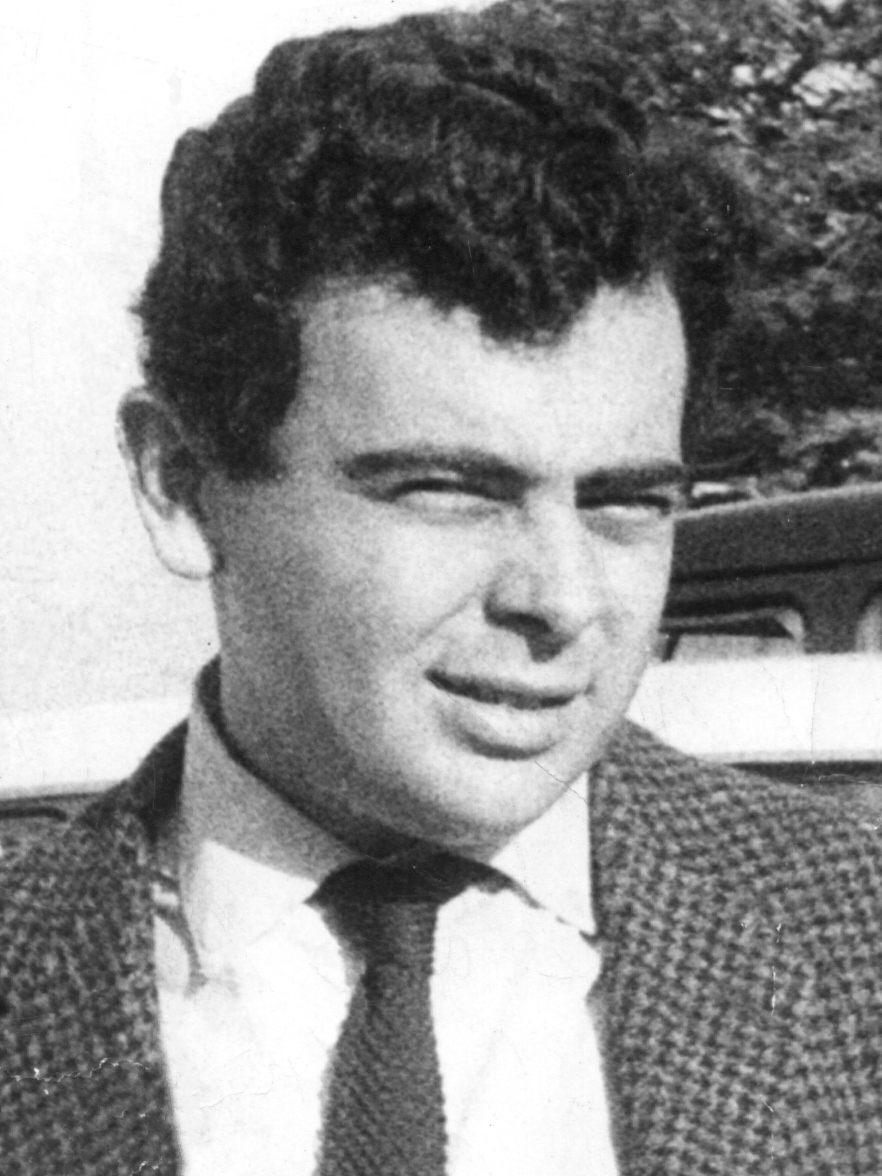
- Born: Glauber de Andrade Rocha; 14 March 1939; Vitória da Conquista, Bahia, Brazil
- Died: 22 August 1981 (aged 42); Rio de Janeiro, Brazil
- Occupation: Film director
- Years active: 1959–1981
- Spouse: Helena Ignez (m. 1959–1961)
- Children: 5
- Relatives: Anecy Rocha (sister)
- Awards: FIPRESCI: 1967 Entranced Earth; Prix de la mise en scène: 1969 Antonio das Mortes; Special Jury Prize for Best Short Film: 1977 Di

Glauber de Andrade Rocha (Brazilian Portuguese: [ˈɡlawbeʁ dʒi ɐ̃ˈdɾadʒi ˈʁɔʃɐ]; 14 March 1939 – 22 August 1981) was a Brazilian film director, actor and screenwriter. He was one of the most influential filmmaker of Brazilian cinema and a key figure of Cinema Novo. His films Black God, White Devil and Entranced Earth are often considered to be two of the greatest achievements in Brazilian cinematic history, being selected by Abraccine as, respectively, the second and fifth best Brazilian films of all time. Rocha also the distinction of having the most films on Abraccine's list: 5 films.

Rocha's films possess a staunch avant-garde and experimental nature, making of him a seminal figure of the new wave. His works are noted for their many political overtones, often addressing the passive-aggressive situation of the Third World, which Rocha referred to both metaphorically and objectively as "hunger" in his essay Estética da Fome (The Aesthetics of Hunger). Rocha won the Prix de la mise en scène at the 1969 Cannes Film Festival for Antonio das Mortes and the 1977 Special Jury Prize for Best Short Film for Di. Three of Rocha's films were nominated for the Palme d'Or, including Entranced Earth, which was awarded the FIPRESCI at the 1967 Cannes Film Festival and the Grand Prix of the Locarno Film Festival of the same year.

== Biography ==
Rocha was born in Vitória da Conquista, Bahia, Brazil, and moved with his family to Salvador when he was only nine years old, there studying in a well-known Presbyterian school.

During his adolescence, he developed great interest in arts, especially theatre and cinema, and even joined a drama group. He was also very active in politics, a trait that would be strongly influential in his works. A member of the Brazilian radical left, he helped start a political party in the late 1950s that called for an anti-capitalist people's revolution and, among other things, advocated the abolition of money.

By the age of 16, he started freelancing for a local newspaper and debuted as a movie reviewer. Later, he attended Law School for about two years and in 1959, after taking part in some projects as assistant, he finally directed his first Short film, Pátio. After gaining some recognition in Bahia for his critical and artistic work, Rocha decided to quit college and pursue a journalistic career, as well as being a film-maker.

He is famous for his film trilogy, made up of Black God, White Devil (1964) – perhaps his most acclaimed movie, nominated for the Golden Palm - Entranced Earth (1967) and Antonio das Mortes (1969), award-winning for Best Director at Cannes. His films were renowned for their strongly-expressed political themes, often combined with mysticism and folklore, but also for their particular style and photography. Rocha is regarded as one of the best Brazilian directors of all time and leader of the Cinema Novo movement, as well as a full-time polemicist. He once said, "I am the Cinema Novo," paraphrasing Louis XIV's famous quote. In an interview with Le Monde, Rocha said: "My Brazilian films belong to a whole period when my generation was full of wild dreams and hopes. They are full of enthusiasm, faith and militancy and were inspired by my great love of Brazil."

In 1969, he was a member of the jury at the 6th Moscow International Film Festival. In the following year, Rocha made a brief appearance in the Dziga Vertov Group film Wind from the East. After refusing an invitation by Jean-Luc Godard to shoot a segment of the film, Rocha appeared as a man in a crossway pointing the direction of the political cinema, namely, the Cinema Novo.

In 1971, during the Brazilian military dictatorship, he left the country to a voluntary exile, dwelling in many places, such as Spain, Chile, and France. He was in Lisbon with his life-partner Juliet Berto directing part of the collective Portuguese film As Armas e o Povo, between April 24th and May 1st 1974. Between 1974 and 1975, they were inseparable and travelled all over Europe with a Super 8. In 1975, he directed "Claro" in Rome, featuring his muse Juliet Berto. In 1981, his Portuguese filmmaker friend Manuel Carvalheiro helped him relocate to the Portuguese Riviera with Paula Gaitan, whom he had married, and their two small children. He never completely returned home until his last days, when he was transferred from Lisbon, where he had been receiving medical treatment for a lung infection, to Rio de Janeiro. Rocha resisted in hospital for few days, but ultimately died on August 22, 1981, at the age of 42. He had been married three times and had five children. His daughter Ava is a singer-songwriter.

== Filmography ==
Key
†	Indicates a documentary	‡	Indicates a short film

List of films directed by Glauber Rocha
Year	Original title	English release title(s)	Language(s)	Notes
1958	Cruz na Praça ^{‡}			Unfinished silent short film. Lost.
1959	Pátio ^{‡}	Terrace	Silent	
1962	Barravento	Barravento / The Turning Wind	Portuguese	
1964	Deus e o Diabo na Terra do Sol	Black God, White Devil	Portuguese	
1965	Amazonas, Amazonas ^{†}		Portuguese	Short documentary on the Amazonas state in Brazil.
1966	Maranhão 66 ^{†}		Portuguese	Short documentary on José Sarney's inaugural address as governor of Maranhão state in Brazil and its poor people's harsh life conditions.
1967	Terra em Transe	Anguished Land / Land Entranced / Land in Anguish / Entranced Earth	Portuguese	
1968	1968 ^{†}		Portuguese	Short documentary on the March of the One Hundred Thousand.
1969	O Dragão da Maldade Contra o Santo Guerreiro	Antonio das Mortes	Portuguese	French-Brazilian-German-American co-production
1970	Der Leone Have Sept Cabeças	Der Leone Have Sept Cabeças, The Lion Has Seven Heads	Portuguese, French, German, English	Brazilian-Italian-French-Congolese co-production.
1970	Cabezas Cortadas	Cutting Heads	Spanish	Spanish-Brazilian co-production.
1972	Câncer	Cancer	Portuguese	Filmed between 1968 and 1972.
1972	Paloma, Paloma ^{†}		Portuguese	A diary of a trip filmed by Glauber in Punta del Este that documents the reunion of the Rocha family.
1973	História do Brasil ^{†}	History of Brazil	Portuguese	Co-directed with Marcos Medeiros. Cuban-Italian co-production. Documentary on the history of Brazil.
1975	Claro		Italian, French, English	Italian production.
1975	As Armas e o Povo ^{†}		Portuguese	Collective film. Directed with Alberto Seixas Santos, António da Cunha Telles, Eduardo Geada, José de Sá Caetano and José Fonseca e Costa. Portuguese production. Documentary on the 1974 Carnation Revolution.
1977	Di ^{†}		Portuguese	Also known as Di Cavalcanti and Di-Glauber. Short documentary on Di Cavalcanti during his wake and burial.
1977	Jorge Amado no Cinema ^{†}		Portuguese	Also known as Jorjamado and Jorjamado no Cinema. Short documentary on Jorge Amado.
1980	A Idade da Terra	The Age of the Earth	Portuguese	
2015	A Vida É Estranha ^{†}		Portuguese	Co-directed with Mossa Bildner. Filmed in 1973. Short documentary on Rocha and Bildner's trip to Essaouira city in Morocco.

== See also ==
- Cinema of Brazil
- List of Brazilian films
- List of Brazilians
