= José Mojica Marins filmography =

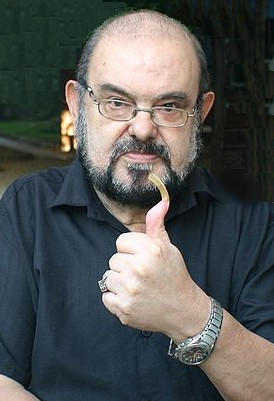
José Mojica Marins

José Mojica Marins (March 13, 1936 – February 19, 2020) was a Brazilian filmmaker, director, screenwriter, film and television actor and media personality. Marins is also known by his alter ego Zé do Caixão (in English, Coffin Joe).

Marins is noted for his trademark low-budget film style, and was known to primarily use friends and amateur actors to portray characters and function as crew. Although primarily known for films of the horror genre, Marins also produced trash cinema, exploitation, drugsploitation, sexploitation (often in the form of pseudo-documentaries), and westerns.

== Filmography ==
Year	Film	Credited as			
Year	Film	Director	Writer	Actor	Role
1958	God's Sentence (Sentença de Deus)	Yes		Yes	Not listed
1958	Adventurer's Fate (A Sina do Aventureiro)	Yes	Yes	Yes	Gregorio
1960	We Were Brothers (Éramos Irmãos)			Yes	Not listed
1963	My Destiny In Your Hands (Meu Destino em Tuas Mãos)	Yes	Yes	Yes	Not listed
1963	At Midnight I'll Take Your Soul (A Meia Noite eu Levarei sua Alma)	Yes	Yes	Yes	Coffin Joe
1965	Nightmare (Pesadelo)	Yes	Yes		
1966	The Devil of Old Town (O Diabo de Vila Velha)		Yes	Yes	Not listed
1967	This Night I'll Possess Your Corpse (Esta Noite Encarnarei no Teu Cadáver)	Yes	Yes	Yes	Coffin Joe
1968	The Strange World of Coffin Joe (O Estranho Mundo do Zé do Caixão)	Yes	Yes		
1968	Trilogy of Terror (Trilogia do Terror)	Segment "Pesadelo Macabro" (Macabre Nightmare)	Yes		
1970	Awakening of the Beast (O Despertar da Besta) (O Ritual dos Sadicos)	Yes	Yes	Yes	Coffin Joe; Himself
1970	The End of Man (Finis Hominis)	Yes	Yes	Yes	Finis Hominis
1972	Sex and Blood in the Trail of the Treasure (Sexo E Sangue na Trilha do Tesouro)	Yes			Not listed
1972	The Prophet of Hunger (O Profeta da Fome)			Yes	Ali Fakir
1972	D'Gajão Kills to Avenge (D'Gajão Mata para Vingar)	Yes	Yes		
1972	When the Gods Fall Asleep (Quando os Deuses Adormecem)	Yes	Yes	Yes	Finis Hominis
1974	The Virgin and the Macho Man (A Virgem e o Machão)	Yes			
1974	The Bloody Exorcism of Coffin Joe (O Exorcismo Negro)	Yes	Yes	Yes	Coffin Joe; Himself
1975	Failure of a Man in the Two Nights of Nuptials (Fracasso de Um Homem nas Duas Noites de Núpcias)	Yes		Yes	Not listed
1976	Women of the Violent Sex (Mulheres do Sexo Violento)			Yes	Juarez
1976	The Strange Hostel of Naked Pleasures (Hospedaria de Prazeres)	Yes	Yes	Yes	Hostel Proprietor
1976	How to Console Widows (Como Consolar Viúvas)	Yes			
1977	Hellish Flesh (Inferno Carnal)	Yes	Yes	Yes	Not listed
1978	The Woman Who Made Doves Fly (A Mulher Que Põe a Pomba no Ar)	Yes			
1978	The Marble Goddess (A Deusa de Mármore)			Yes	Seu Sete Encruzilhada
1978	Hallucinations of a Deranged Mind (Delírios de um Anormal)	Yes	Yes	Yes	Coffin Joe
1979	Perversion (Estupro!) (Perversão)	Yes	Yes	Yes	Vittorio Palestrina
1979	World Market of Sex (Mundo-mercado do Sexo)	Yes	Yes	Yes	Not listed
1980	A Praga (The Plague)	Yes	Yes		
1984	Fifth Dimension of Sex (A Quinta Dimensão do Sexo)	Yes		Yes	Not listed
1985	24 Hours of Explicit Sex (24 Horas de Sexo Explícito)	Yes			
1986	The Hour of Fear (A Hora do Medo)	Yes		Yes	Not listed
1986	The Two Faces of a Psychopath (As Duas Faces de um Psicopata)	(as J. Avelar)			
1987	48 Hours of Hallucinatory Sex (48 Horas de Sexo Alucinante)	Yes			Himself
1987	Dr. Frank in the Clinic of the Taras (Dr. Frank na Clínica das Taras)	Yes	Yes		
1987	Demons and Wonders (Demônios e Maravilhas)	Yes	Yes	Yes	Himself (Documentary)
2008	Embodiment of Evil (Encarnação do Demônio)	Yes	Yes	Yes	Coffin Joe (Josafel Zanatas)

== Films about José Mojica Marins ==
Year	Film		
Year	Film	Director	Writer
1976	The Universe of Mojica Marins (O Universo de José Mojica Marins)	Ivan Cardoso	Not listed
2001	Damned - The Strange World of José Mojica Marins (Maldito - O Estranho Mundo de José Mojica Marins)	André Barcinski; Ivan Finotti	André Barcinski; Ivan Finotti
