= List of Brazilian films of the 1970s =

An incomplete list of films produced in Brazil in the 1970s. For an alphabetical list of films currently on Wikipedia see Category:Brazilian films

== 1970 ==
Title	Director	Cast	Genre	Notes
1970
Awakening of the Beast (O Ritual dos Sádicos) (O Despertar da Besta)	José Mojica Marins	José Mojica Marins, Ângelo Assunção, Ronaldo Beibe, Andreia Bryan, João Callegaro	Horror	
Audácia	Antônio Lima, Carlos Reichenbach	Jorge Bodanzky, Letácio Camargo, Maurice Capovila, José Carlos Cardoso, Francis Cavalcanti, Zilda Cheneme	Segments	
A Arte de Amar Bem				
O Anunciador - O Homem das Tormentas				
Amor em Quatro Tempos				
Anjos e Demônios				
Ascensão e Queda de um Paquera	Victor di Mello		Comedy	
Beto Rockfeller				
Betão Ronca Ferro				
Bahia Por Exemplo				
Balada Dos Infiéis				
Barão Olavo, o Horrível				
Brasil Bom de Bola				
Finis Hominis	José Mojica Marins	José Mojica Marins	Drama	
O Bolão				
Azyllo Muito Louco	Nelson Pereira dos Santos			Entered into the 1970 Cannes Film Festival
O Palácio dos Anjos	Walter Hugo Khouri			Entered into the 1970 Cannes Film Festival
Pindorama	Arnaldo Jabor			Entered into the 1971 Cannes Film Festival
The Prophet of Hunger	Maurice Capovila			Entered into the 20th Berlin International Film Festival
Of Gods and the Undead	Ruy Guerra			Entered into the 20th Berlin International Film Festival
Mortal Sin	Miguel Faria, Jr.			

== 1971 ==
Title	Director	Cast	Genre	Notes
1971
Amor Louco				
Os Amores de Um Cafona				
Ana Terra				
André, a Cara e a Coragem				
Assalto à Brasileira				
Até o Último Mercenário				
Aventuras com Tio Maneco				
Bang Bang				
Bonga, O Vagabundo				
Como Era Gostoso o Meu Francês	Nelson Pereira dos Santos	Arduíno Colassanti, Ana Maria Magalhães, Eduardo Imbassahy Filho, Manfredo Colassanti, José Kléber, Gabriel Archanjo	Black comedy	Entered into the 21st Berlin International Film Festival
O Barão Otelo no Barato dos Bilhões				
Pra Quem Fica, Tchau	Reginaldo Faria			
In the Family	Paulo Porto			Entered into the 7th Moscow International Film Festival

== 1972 ==
Title	Director	Cast	Genre	Notes
1972
Ali Babá e os Quarenta Ladrões				
Amazônia				
Amor, Carnaval e Sonhos				
O Anjo Negro				
O Azarento				
Joao	George Sluizer			Entered into the 22nd Berlin International Film Festival
O Profeto da Fome (The Prophet of Hunger)	Mario Lima	José Mojica Marins	Drama	
Quando os Deuses Adormecem (When the Gods Fall Asleep)	José Mojica Marins	José Mojica Marins	Black comedy	
Sexo E Sangue na Trilha do Tesouro (Sex and Blood in the Trail of the Treasure)	José Mojica Marins	José Mojica Marins	Horror	

== 1973 ==
Title	Director	Cast	Genre	Notes
1973
Amante Muito Louca				
Aladim e a Lâmpada Maravilhosa				
All Nudity Shall Be Punished	Arnaldo Jabor			Won the Silver Bear at Berlin
The Awakening of Annie				
Anjo Loiro				
Aquelhas Mulheres				
Boi de Prata				
Sagarana: The Duel	Paulo Thiago			Entered into the 24th Berlin International Film Festival
Tati	Bruno Barreto			Entered into the 8th Moscow International Film Festival
O Picapau Amarelo	Geraldo Sarno			

== 1974 ==
Title	Director	Cast	Genre	Notes
1974
Ainda Agarro Esta Vizinha...				
Adultério, as Regras do Jogo				
As Alegres Vigaristas				
Amor e Medo				
O Amuleto de Ogum	Nelson Pereira dos Santos			Entered into the 1975 Cannes Film Festival
O Anjo da Noite				
Zézero				
Banana Mecânica				
Biblioteca Nacional				
The Night of the Scarecrow	Sérgio Ricardo			
O Exorcismo Negro (The Bloody Exorcism of Coffin Joe)	José Mojica Marins	José Mojica Marins	Black comedy	

== 1975 ==
Title	Director	Cast	Genre	Notes
1975
Ainda Agarro Esse Machão				
Amadas e Violentadas				
Amantes, Amanhã Se Houver Sol				
Ana, a Libertina				
Assim Era a Atlântida				
As Audaciosas				
As Aventuras Amorosas de Um Padeiro				
As Aventuras de Um Detetive Português				
Bacalhau				
Blablablá				
Bonecas Diabólicas				
Joanna Francesa	Carlos Diegues	Jeanne Moreau, Eliezer Gomes	Drama	Franco-Brazilian co-production

== 1976 ==
Title	Director	Cast	Genre	Notes
1976
A Queda	Ruy Guerra, Nelson Xavier			Won the Silver Bear - Special Jury Prize at Berlin
Dona Flor and Her Two Husbands	Bruno Barreto		Comedy	
Aleluia Gretchen				
Aruã na Terra dos Homens Maus				
Assuntina das Amérikas				
Bandalheira Infernal				
Como Consular Vuívas	José Mojica Marins		Comedy	
The Last Plantation	Marcos Farias			Entered into the 26th Berlin International Film Festival
Zeca E Juca				

== 1977 ==
Title	Director	Cast	Genre	Notes
1977
O Abismo				
Ajuricaba, o Rebelde da Amazônia				
As Amantes de Um Canalha				
Os Amores da Pantera				
Anchieta, José do Brasil				
Antônio Conselheiro E a Guerra dos Pelados				
Barra Pesada				
Belas e Corrompidas				
Lucio Flavio	Héctor Babenco	Reginaldo Faria	Crime drama	
Tenda dos Milagres	Nelson Pereira dos Santos	Hugo Carvana	Drama	Entered into the 27th Berlin International Film Festival

== 1978 ==
Title	Director	Cast	Genre	Notes
1978
Agonia				
Amada Amante				
O Aleijadinho				
As Amantes de Um Homem Proibido				
As Amantes Latinas				
O Amante de Minha Mulher				
O Artesão de Mulheres				
O Atleta Sexual				
Augustin Urban, Um Pintor				
As Aventuras de Robinson Crusoé				
A Batalha dos Guararapes				
O Bandido Antonio Do				
O Bom Marido				
Bonitas e Gostosas				
Brasil Bom de Bola 78				
Colonel Delmiro Gouveia	Geraldo Sarno	Rubens de Falco	Drama	Screened in the Un Certain Regard section at the 1978 Cannes Film Festival
Lady on the Bus	Neville de Almeida	Sônia Braga, Nuno Leal Maia	Erotic drama	
A Summer Rain	Carlos Diegues	Joffre Soares, Miriam Pires	Drama	

== 1979 ==
Title	Director	Cast	Genre	Notes
1979
Alucinada Pelo Desejo				
Bye Bye Brasil	Carlos Diegues			Palme d'Or nominated film at the 1980 Cannes Film Festival
Histórias Que Nossas Babás Não Contavam				Softcore porn
A Intrusa	Carlos Hugo Christensen		Drama	
Amante Latino				
Os Amantes da Chuva				
As Amiguinhas				
Amor e Traição				
Amerika				
Amor bandido				
A Ilha dos Prazeres Proibidos	Carlos Reichenbach		Erotic thriller	
A Banda das Velhas Virgens				
Bandido, Fúria do Sexo				
O Bom Burguês				
As Borboletas Também Amam				
