= The Fifth Dimension of Sex =

1984 film directed by José Mojica Marins

- A 5ª Dimensão do Sexo
- Directed by: José Mojica Marins
- Written by: Mário Lima
- Produced by: Mário Lima
- Starring: José Mojica Marins; Mário Lima; Débora Muniz
- Cinematography: Virgílio Roveda
- Edited by: Nilcemar Leyart
- Music by: Nobile; Pedro Luiz
- Release date: 1984
- Running time: 81 minutes
- Country: Brazil
- Language: Portuguese

The Fifth Dimension of Sex (original title: A 5ª Dimensão do Sexo, A Quinta Dimensão Do Sexo) is a 1984 Brazilian exploitation film directed by Brazilian filmmaker José Mojica Marins. The film is one of several exploitation sex films that Marins made throughout the 1980s.

== Plot ==
Two chemistry students, Paulo and Norberto are ridiculed by their classmates, as it is rumored that they are impotent. They work together to develop a formula that turns them into crazed sex maniacs, and begin kidnapping women on the streets and raping them. The series of sex crimes soon leads to a police chase, and the two men discover that they are in love with each other.

== Cast ==
- José Mojica Marins
- Mário Lima
- Débora Muniz
- Marcio Prado
- João Francisco
- Mayo, Zilda
- Moreno, Maristela
- Berthon, Michelle
- Palácio, Roque
- Moraes, Tony
- Mathias, Marthus
- Catozzi, Albano

== Background ==
The film may be considered as an example of pornochanchada that includes elements of political subversion.
