= Ivan Cardoso =

Ivan Cardoso may refer to:

- Ivan Cardoso (director) (born 1952), Brazilian filmmaker
- Ivan Cardoso (footballer) (born 2003), Portuguese footballer
