= Damned – The Strange World of José Mojica Marins =

2001 film

Damned - The Strange World of José Mojica Marins
- Film screenshot: José Mojica Marins
- Directed by: André Barcinski; Ivan Finotti
- Written by: André Barcinski; Ivan Finotti
- Produced by: André Barcinski; Ivan Finotti
- Starring: José Mojica Marins; Mario Lima; Rubens Lucetti
- Cinematography: André Barcinski; Ivan Finotti
- Edited by: Ivan Finotti
- Release date: 2001
- Running time: 65 minutes
- Country: Brazil
- Language: Portuguese

Damned – The Strange World of José Mojica Marins (original title: Maldito - O Estranho Mundo de José Mojica Marins) is a 2001 Brazilian documentary film directed by André Barcinski and Ivan Finotti.

== Overview ==
The film tells the story of the Brazilian filmmaker, director, screenwriter, film and television actor and media personality José Mojica Marins. The film features Marins (as himself) and his associates and family members recounting episodes of his life and career from childhood to international recognition in later years.

== Accolades ==
The film received the Special Jury Award in Latin American Cinema at the 2001 Sundance Film Festival.

== Cast ==
- José Mojica Marins (as himself)
- Mário Lima
- Rubens Lucchetti
- Conceição Marins
- Nilcemar Leyart

== See also ==
- Demons and Wonders
- Coffin Joe
