= 24 Hours of Explicit Sex =

1985 film by José Mojica Marins

- Video tape cover for 24 Horas de Sexo Ardente
- Directed by: José Mojica Marins
- Written by: Mário Lima
- Produced by: Mário Lima
- Starring: Vânia Bonier; Albano Catozzi; Bené de Oliveira; Sílvio Júnior
- Cinematography: Virgílio Roveda
- Edited by: Valmir Dias
- Release date: 13 May 1985
- Running time: 77 minutes
- Country: Brazil
- Language: Portuguese

24 Hours of Explicit Sex (original title: 24 Horas de Sexo Explícito) is a 1985 sexploitation B-film by Brazilian director José Mojica Marins. Marins is also known by his alter ego Zé do Caixão (Eng: Coffin Joe).

Marins shot the film for the production company Fotocenas Filmes which agreed to finance his project of a new Zé do Caixão film. After the release of the film, producers failed to finance Marins for his project. 24 Horas de Sexo Explícito was Marins' biggest box-office success and two years later, he directed a sequel named 48 Hours of Hallucinatory Sex.

== Plot ==
Three men make a wager on which one will have sex with more women in a period of 24 hours. They hire an obese and flamboyant gay man to be the judge and keep tally. They get seven "ugly" women for the challenge. One man comments to another that "these women look like something from a Coffin Joe movie". The men gather them at a beach house and the competition begins. One man decides to quit the competition and return home to his wife (veteran Brazilian porn actress Vânia Bournier), whom he finds having sexual intercourse with "Jack", their German Shepherd dog, in Brazil's first scene of cinematic zoophilia. (The sex was simulated.) Her husband takes revenge by leaving her to romance a talking male horse, whom the man persuades to penetrate her in the rear-end. Most sexual events are narrated and critiqued by a caged parrot.

When the 24 hour period expires, the judge counts the scores of the remaining two men and the score is tied. They are encouraged until the judge announces the tie-breaker would involve the men performing acts on the judge. The duo flees the beach house pursued by the eager judge as the end screen appears.
