= When the Gods Fall Asleep =

1972 Brazilian film

- Original film poster
- Directed by: José Mojica Marins
- Written by: Jose Mojica Marins; Rubens Francisco Luchetti
- Produced by: Nelson Teixeira Mendes
- Starring: José Mojica Marins
- Cinematography: Edward Freund
- Edited by: Jovita Pereira Dias
- Music by: Kelpson Correa; Leonardo Maluf
- Production company: N.T.M. Filmes
- Distributed by: Multifilmes
- Release date: 27 November 1972
- Running time: 82 minutes
- Country: Brazil
- Language: Portuguese

When the Gods Fall Asleep (Portuguese: Quando os Deuses Adormecem) is a 1972 Brazilian film directed by José Mojica Marins. Marins is best known for the Zé do Caixão (Coffin Joe) film series. The film is a sequel to Marins' 1971 film The End of Man (Finis Hominis), in which the character of Finis Hominis, an influential, messianic culture figure turns out to be an escaped mental patient. Rather than the horror themes which Marins was noted for, the film, like its predecessor, is low budget black humored social satire.

In this film, Finis Hominis (after returning to the asylum) again feels the need to escape the asylum in order to put right the world's increasing social unrest that he sees in the news.

== Plot ==
Finis Hominis is a mental patient who is kept in an insane asylum, and is known for his occasional escapes from the institution, including the most recent episode during which Finis Hominis became a powerful world figure during the few days of his escape.

Again hospitalized, he sees in the news increasing social, religious, and political unrest in the world, and again feels the need to escape the institution to put order in the streets. He wanders through society, influencing and interfering in isolated incidents, correcting wrongs and exposing corruption primarily in a strictly accidental or coincidental manner.

There is also a parallel sub-plot regarding the impending closure of the asylum due to the cessation of funding from an anonymous benefactor.

== Cast ==
- José Mojica Marins
- Andréa Bryan
- Rosalvo Caçador
- Maria Cristina
- Nivaldo de Lima
- Sabrina Marquezine
- Palito
- Amires Paranhos
- Walter C. Portella
- Araken Saldanha (as the voice of José Mojica Marins)
- Roney Wanderney
