= 48 Hours of Hallucinatory Sex =

1987 film directed by José Mojica Marins

- Original Brazilian theatrical release poster
- Directed by: José Mojica Marins
- Written by: Mario Lima
- Produced by: Mário Lima; Nelson Carlos Magalhães
- Starring: Jose Mojica Marins; Mario Lima; Magna Miller
- Cinematography: Virgílio Roveda
- Edited by: Valmir Dias (as Mack Brown)
- Release date: 27 April 1987
- Running time: 99 min
- Country: Brazil
- Language: Portuguese

48 Hours of Hallucinatory Sex (original title: 48 Horas de Sexo Alucinante) is a 1987 Brazilian trash/sexploitation film by Brazilian film director José Mojica Marins. Marins is also known by his alter ego Zé do Caixão (in English, Coffin Joe). The film is the third of several sexploitation films Marins released in the 1980s. It was preceded by World Market of Sex (1979) and 24 Hours of Explicit Sex (1985).

== Plot ==
In the film (as well as its two predecessors), Marins exploited Brazil's then loosening restrictions on nudity in film in order to produce an alternate sort of pornography which presents physical sexuality with bizarre and often repulsive imagery, generally depicting characters which are carrying out some type of test, contest, or experiment.

The plot of the film centers on a female sexologist who wishes to finance and produce a pornographic film. As the film progresses it is revealed that the doctor may have an ulterior goal in coaxing her actors into their drugged and sexually frenzied states. Ultimately the doctor persuades a man to dress in an ox costume and penetrate her vaginally while she is naked inside a wooden cow.

== Cast ==
- Oswaldo Cirilo
- Walter Gabarron
- Zé da Ilha
- Sílvio Junior
- Mário Lima
- Nelson Carlos Magalhães
- José Mojica Marins
- Benê de Oliveira
- Andrea Pucci
- Nádia Tell
