= The Strange World of Coffin Joe (TV series) =

The Strange World of Coffin Joe (O Estranho Mundo de Zé do Caixão) is a monthly interview program on the Brazilian television station Canal Brasil, hosted by José Mojica Marins portraying his character Coffin Joe. Marins discusses Brazilian media and culture with other contemporary figures such as actors and musicians. His guests have included Zé Ramalho, NX Zero, and Supla. The programs are viewable on the show's website. Not to be confused with his film of the same name.

== Episode guide ==
- Odair José:

Marins visits the Star Wars Brazil Festival, interviews Odair José, a Brazilian singer. Odair José discusses his early career, the encounter with the Young Guard and sings "Stop taking the pill."

- NX Zero:

Marins visits the RPG Brazil Festival and talks about Coffin Joe Dramatical Arts School, interviews NX Zero, a Brazilian emo/pop punk band.
