= Perversion (disambiguation) =

Perversion is a behavior that is a serious deviation from what is orthodox or normal.

Perversion may also refer to:

== Math and science ==
- Tendril perversion, a reversal of handedness in helical curves
- Pathological (mathematics), a particularly "badly-behaved" mathematical object
- Perverse incentives
- Perverse voting rules, where increasing a candidate's support can cause them to lose

== Arts ==
- Perversion (album), a 1998 industrial album by Gravity Kills
- Perversion (film), a 1979 Brazilian exploitation film
- Perverse (album), a 1993 album by the British rock band Jesus Jones
- Perverts (album), a 2025 studio recording by Ethel Cain
- Pervert!, a 2005 film
- "Perversion", a song by Rob Zombie from Hellbilly Deluxe
- "Pervert", a song by the Descendents from I Don't Want to Grow Up
