= Sex and Blood in the Trail of the Treasure =

1972 film directed by José Mojica Marins

- Original Brazilian film poster
- Directed by: José Mojica Marins
- Written by: José Mojica Marins; Rubens Francisco Luchetti
- Produced by: Nélson Teixeira Mendes
- Starring: José Mojica Marins
- Cinematography: Synésio Silva
- Edited by: Roberto Leme
- Music by: Giuseppe Mastroianni
- Production company: N.T.M. Filmes
- Distributed by: Difibra Filmes; Multifilmes
- Release date: March 20, 1972
- Running time: 85 minutes
- Country: Brazil
- Language: Portuguese

Sex and Blood in the Trail of the Treasure (Portuguese: Sexo e Sangue na Trilha do Tesouro) is a 1972 Brazilian exploitation/adventure film directed by José Mojica Marins. Marins is also known by his alter ego Zé do Caixão (in English, Coffin Joe).

Producer Nélson Teixeira Mendes recruited Marins to make a low budget adventure film with a likely high financial return. The director used surplus segments of Glauco Mirko Laurelli's 1966 film Bloody Inheritance.

== Plot ==
A gang of criminals organizes an expedition to the Amazonian forests in search of a lost treasure from a downed airplane. The members of the expedition enter into conflict because of gold and women, some committing suicide and others murdering the others.

== Cast ==
In alphabetical order

- Alfredo Almeida
- Antônio Andrade
- Big Boy
- Andreia Bryan
- Marlene Caminhoto
- Eurípedes da Silva (as Eurípides Silva)
- José Galã
- Djalma Leite
- Faria Magalhães
- Rosângela Maldonado
- José Mojica Marins
- Índio Paraguaio
- Roque Rodrigues
- Frederico Scarlatti
- Ailton Vaz
