= Trilogy of Terror (1968 film) =

1968 film by José Mojica Marins

- Original film poster
- Directed by: José Mojica Marins; Luís Sérgio Person; Ozualdo Candeias
- Written by: Ozualdo Candeias; José Mojica Marins; Rubens Francisco Luchetti; Luís Sérgio Person
- Produced by: Renato Grechi; Antonio Polo Galante
- Cinematography: Giorgio Attili; Oswaldo de Oliveira; Peter Overbeck
- Edited by: Sylvio Reinoldi
- Music by: Damiano Cozzella; Rogério Duprat
- Production companies: P.N.F; Produções Galasy; Companhia Cinematográfica Franco-Brasileira
- Distributed by: Produções Cinematográficas Zé do Caixão
- Release date: 22 April 1968
- Running time: 115 minutes
- Country: Brazil
- Language: Portuguese

Trilogy of Terror (Portuguese: Trilogia de Terror) is a 1968 Brazilian anthology horror film directed by José Mojica Marins, Luís Sérgio Person and Ozualdo Candeias. The film consists of three stories adapted from the TV series Além, Muito Além do Além (Beyond, Much Beyond the Beyond): O Acordo (The Agreement), A Procissão dos Mortos (Procession of Dead), and Pesadelo Macabro (Macabre Nightmare).

== Plot ==
The Agreement (O Acordo)

A mother becomes involved with black magic and offers a virgin woman to the devil in exchange for curing the illness of her only son. (40 minutes)

Cast: Lucy Rangel, Regina Célia, Durvalino de Souza, Luis Humberto, Alex Ronay, Henrique Borgens, Ugarte, Nádia Tell, Éddio Smani, Eucaris de Morais.

Procession of Dead (A Procissão dos Mortos)

A poor laborer is the only man in one village with courage to face a group of guerrilheiros ("guerrilla ghosts") that haunt the minds of the local villagers. (28 minutes)

Cast: Lima Duarte, Cassilda Lanuza, Waldir Guedes, Carlos Alberto Romano, Roberto Ferreira (Zé Coió), Lenoir Bittencourt, Pontes Santos, Wilson Júnior, Francisco Ribeiro.

Macabre Nightmare (Pesadelo Macabro)

A young man named Claudio (Mário Lima) is afflicted by fear of reptiles and spiders and the fear of being buried alive. When he undergoes a shocking event, he becomes unresponsive and is mistakenly buried, only to revive in the coffin after burial. His screams of terror from underground go unheard by the villagers (31 minutes)

Cast: Mário Lima, Vany Miller, Nelson Gasparini, Ingrid Holt, Walter C. Portella, Kátia Dumont, Francis Mary, Milene Drumont, Sebastião Grandin, Paula Ramos.
