= God's Sentence =

Unfinished film directed by José Mojica Marins

- Theatrical release poster
- Directed by: Jose Mojica Marins
- Written by: José Mojica Marins
- Produced by: Augusto Pereira
- Starring: José Mojica Marins; Aldenoura de Sá Porto; Conchita Espanhol
- Cinematography: Honorio Marin
- Edited by: Luiz Elias
- Music by: João da Silva
- Production company: Apolo Filmes
- Country: Brazil
- Language: Portuguese

God's Sentence (Portuguese: Sentença de Deus) is an unfinished Brazilian film project developed between 1954 and 1956, directed by José Mojica Marins. Marins is also known by his alter ego Zé do Caixão (in English, Coffin Joe). The film was restored into a complete format in 2007 by Portal Heco de Cinema de Brasil.

== Synopsis ==
Antonio, desperate man who cannot maintain a job to support his mother, Dona Lídia, and his sister Marta, after his father, a banker and patriarchal head of the family, is killed. Later, he boards a group of criminals who plan a robbery and they want him to be the driver.

The production of the film was interrupted after some problems, including the death of actress Conchita Espanhol.

== Cast ==
- Aldenoura de Sá Porto
- Conchita Espanhol
- José Mojica Marins
- Nancy Montez
- Rosita Soler
