= The Virgin and the Macho Man =

1974 film by José Mojica Marins

- A Virgem e o Machão
- Directed by: José Mojica Marins (as J. Avelar)
- Written by: Georgina Duarte
- Produced by: Augusto de Cervantes; Georgina Duarte
- Starring: Aurélio Tomassini; Walter C. Portella; Augusto de Cervantes
- Cinematography: Eliseo Fernandes
- Edited by: Nilcemar Leyart
- Production company: MASP Filmes
- Distributed by: Brasecran
- Release date: August 10, 1974
- Running time: 90 minutes
- Country: Brazil
- Language: Portuguese

The Virgin and the Macho Man (Portuguese: A Virgem e o Machão) is a 1974 Brazilian sex comedy film directed by José Mojica Marins under the pseudonym J. Avelar. It is also Marins' first film in the pornochanchada genre.

== Plot ==
Two doctors are called to work at a city hospital, and soon attract the attention of all the local women. When their wives discover a sexual bet has been made between their husbands and a stranger, they decide to retaliate and call the macho man for a holiday in a country house.

== Cast ==
Aurélio Tomassini, Esperança Villanueva, Walter C. Portella, Vosmarline Siqueira, Alex Delamotte, Lisa Negri, Augusto de Cervantes, Gracinda Fernandes, Eddio Smani, Chaguinha
