= André Barcinski =

American-born Brazilian journalist

- Born: 1968 (age 57–58); New York
- Education: Universidade Federal Fluminense
- Occupations: Journalist, screenwriter, director, writer
- Years active: 1970–present
- Website: www.andrebarcinski.com.br

André Barcinski (New York City, 1968) is an American-born Brazilian journalist, screenwriter, and TV director.

He is currently a film and music critic for newspaper Folha de S.Paulo.

He's worked for foreign magazines such as Creem, Spin, Fangoria and Cult Movies, and published a chapter on José Mojica Marins in the book Fear Without Frontiers – Weird and Wonderful Cinema Across the Globe (FAB Press, 2003). He has also collaborated with British magazine Granta.

== Career ==
Raised by a family of Polish origin, he graduated in journalism at Universidade Federal Fluminense (UFF).

He was editor of the Varieties section of newspaper Notícias Populares and had a column on Trip magazine.

In 2007, he founded the Clash Club with Gabriel Gaiarsa and Sérgio Godoy in the Barra Funda district of São Paulo.

Between November 2013 and March 2016, he had a column on the R7 portal of Grupo Record. Between October 2016 and December 2020, he also had a column on UOL.

Since May 2020, he presents the podcast ABFP – Álvaro & Barcinski & Forasta & Paulão, with Álvaro Pereira Júnior, André Forastieri and Paulo César Martin. Since September of that year, he also presents the podcast B3 com with Benjamin Back, music producer João Marcello Bôscoli and Ice Blue (Racionais MC's).

=== TV and cinema ===
He directed the documentary Damned – The Strange World of José Mojica Marins (2001), about filmmaker José Mojica Marins, which won the Jury's Award at Sundance Film Festival (US) and the Audience Award at It's All True Festival (São Paulo).

In 2002, he co-directed with Heitor D’Alincourt the documentary Saudações Tricolores, about the centenary of Fluminense FC, his favorite team.

From 2008 to 2014, he was director of the program O Estranho Mundo de Zé do Caixão on Canal Brasil. He also screenwrote the TV series Zé do Caixão (2015), on Space.

He also directed the programs Eletrogordo (3 seasons) and Nasi Noite Adentro (6 seasons), also on Canal Brasil.

On June 17, 2019, the documental miniseries História Secreta do Pop Brasileiro premiered at the In-Edit, festival in São Paulo. Later, it was made available on Prime Video.

In 2021, his series Hit Parade, about music in the 1980s, premiered on Canal Brasil.

=== Books ===
Barcinski authored seven books, including Barulho (1992), which won the Jabuti award of best news story.

In 2012, he released the Guia da Culinária Ogra – 195 lugares para comer até cair, which covers 195 restaurants and snack houses to eat a lot for a cheap price in São Paulo.

In 2016, he released the biography of musician João Gordo, his friend, called João Gordo: Viva La Vida Tosca. One year later, he released another biography: Marcelo Nova, frontman of Camisa de Vênus.

In the end of 2023, he released the book Tudo Passará – A Vida de Nelson Ned, o Pequeno Gigante da Canção via Companhia das Letras.

== Partial bibliography ==
- Barulho – Uma viagem pelo underground do rock americano (Editora Pauliceia – 1992)
- Maldito – A vida e o cinema de José Mojica Marins, o Zé do Caixão – with Ivan Finotti (Editora 34 – 1998)
- Sepultura – Toda a história – com Silvio Gomes (Editora 34 – 1999)
- Guia da Culinária Ogra – 195 lugares para comer até cair (Editora Planeta – 2012)
- Pavões Misteriosos 1974–1983: A explosão da música pop no Brasil (Editora Três Estrelas – 2014)
- Zé do Caixão: Maldito – A biografia – with Ivan Finotti (reviewed and expanded edition of Maldito – A vida e o cinema de José Mojica Marins, o Zé do Caixão) (Editora Darkside Books – 2015)
- João Gordo: Viva La Vida Tosca (Editora Darkside Books – 2016)
- Marcelo Nova: O Galope do Tempo (Editora Benvirá – 2017)
- Barulho – 30 anos (reviewed and expanded edition of Barulho – Uma viagem pelo underground do rock americano) (2023)
- Tudo passará: A vida de Nelson Ned, o Pequeno Gigante da Canção (Companhia das Letras – 2023)
