= Nico Rosso =

Italian-Brazilian comics artist

- Born: 19 July 1910; Turin
- Died: 1 October 1981 (aged 71); São Paulo
- Occupation: Comics artist, illustrator, art educator
- Spouse(s): Tina Billi
- Children: 2
- Awards: Troféu Angelo Agostini for Master of National Comics (1986)
- Website: www.rosso.com.br/nico/index1.htm

Nicolas Rosso (Turin, July 19, 1910 - São Paulo, October 1st, 1981) was an Italian-Brazilian comic artist. Born in Italy, he studied with the masters Giacomo Grosso and Giovanni Reduzzi. He also taught Illustration and Costume History at the Bernard Semeriz School of Graphic Arts. He married Tina Billi in 1937 and had two children: Gianluigi Rosso and Valeria Rosso. He lost almost all of his possessions during World War II, moving to Brazil in 1947 (his family arrived the following year). In São Paulo, he started working in the Arts Department of Editora Brasilgráfica. After that, he became a freelance illustrator, drawing covers and comics for several publishers. Rosso has worked with all comic book genres, but his main works were in the horror genre, including the Coffin Joe comics. He was also a professor at the Escola Panamericana de Artes, which he co-founded. He retired in 1976 for health reasons and died in 1981 after suffering three heart attacks. In 1986, he was awarded posthumously with the Prêmio Angelo Agostini for Master of National Comics, an award that aims to honor artists who have dedicated themselves to Brazilian comics for at least 25 years.
