= How to Console Widows =

1976 film directed by José Mojica Marins

- Theatrical release poster
- Directed by: José Mojica Marins (as J. Avelar)
- Written by: Georgina Duarte
- Produced by: Augusto de Cervantes; Georgina Duarte
- Starring: Vic Barone; Zélia Diniz; Vosmarline Siqueira; Lourênia Machado
- Cinematography: Georgio Attili
- Edited by: Roberto Leme
- Music by: Solon Curvelo
- Production company: MASP Filmes
- Distributed by: Program Filmes
- Release date: 29 November 1976
- Running time: 93 minutes
- Country: Brazil
- Language: Portuguese

How to Console Widows (Portuguese: Como Consolar Viúvas) is a 1976 Brazilian film directed by José Mojica Marins. Marins is best known for the Zé do Caixão (Coffin Joe) film series. In this film Marins is credited as J. Avelar.

== Premise ==
A bankrupt playboy makes a plan to obtain money. He reads in the news about the death of three wealthy married rich men who die in a plane crash. Disguised as a ghost, that night he visits the three widows. Scared, they not only give him money, but also consent to having sex with him.

When the three women become pregnant, the father hires a priest to exorcise the little ghosts from them.

== Cast ==
- Vic Barone
- Zélia Diniz
- Vosmarline Siqueira
- Lourênia Machado
- Walter Portela
- Vick Militello
- Chaguinha
- João Paulo Ramalho
- Helena Samara
- René Mauro
- José Carvalho
- David Húngaro
