= Demons and Wonders =

1987 film directed by José Mojica Marins

- Original Brazilian film poster
- Directed by: José Mojica Marins
- Written by: José Mojica Marins; Regina Andrion; Crounel Marins
- Produced by: José Mojica Marins
- Starring: José Mojica Marins
- Cinematography: Giorgio Attili
- Edited by: Nilcemar Leyart
- Release date: 1987
- Running time: 49 minutes
- Country: Brazil
- Language: Portuguese

Demons and Wonders (original title: Demônios e Maravilhas) is a 1987 Brazilian autobiographical documentary film by and about Brazilian filmmaker, director, screenwriter, film and television actor and media personality José Mojica Marins. Marins is also known by his alter ego Zé do Caixão (in English, Coffin Joe). In the film Marins focuses on himself in scenes recounting life and experiences in filmmaking, with much focus on Marins' many battles with Brazilian film censors.

Marins began filming a second installment of the film called Alucinação Macabra (Macabre Hallucination), which consisted of scenes from his films mixed with video segments. Although all filming was completed, the film was never edited or released due to finances.

== Cast ==
- Carmem Marins
- Elza Leonetti do Amaral
- Francisco Cavalcanti
- Joffre Soares
- José Mojica Marins (as himself)
- Lírio Bertelli
- Nilcemar Leyart
- Pelé
- Satã
- Sílvio Santos

== See also ==
- Damned – The Strange World of José Mojica Marins
