= R. F. Lucchetti =

Brazilian writer, screenwriter and editor (1930–2024)

- Born: Rubens Francisco Lucchetti; 29 January 1930; Santa Rita do Passa Quatro, Brazil
- Died: 4 April 2024 (aged 94); Ribeirão Preto, Brazil
- Occupations: Writer, screenwriter, editor, comics writer, novelist
- Awards: Prêmio Angelo Agostini for Master of National Comics (1989)
- Website: http://www.rflucchetti.com.br

Rubens Francisco Lucchetti (29 January 1930 – 4 April 2024) was a Brazilian fiction writer, illustrator, writer and scripts for films, comic books and photo comics. Luchetti wrote more than 30 books under his name and over 1500 crime and horror fiction works under several pen names. He also wrote screenplays for films directed by José Mojica Marins and Ivan Cardoso. Lucchetti died from respiratory failure on 4 April 2024, at the age of 94.

== Screenplays ==
=== Film ===
- O Estranho Mundo de Zé do Caixão (1968, José Mojica Marins)
- Trilogia de Terror (1968, José Mojica Marins), episode Pesadelo Macabro
- O Despertar da Besta (1969, José Mojica Marins)
- A Marca da Ferradura (1971, Nelson Teixeira Mendes)
- Finis Hominis (1971, José Mojica Marins)
- Sexo e Sangue na Trilha do Tesouro (1971, José Mojica Marins)
- A Herdeira Rebelde (1972, Nelson Teixeira Mendes)
- Quando os Deuses Adormecem (1972, directed by José Mojica Marins)
- Exorcismo Negro (1974, José Mojica Marins)
- A Estranha Hospedaria dos Prazeres (1976, José Mojica Marins)
- Inferno Carnal (1976, José Mojica Marins)
- Delírios de um Anormal (1978, José Mojica Marins)
- Mundo – Mercado do Sexo (1978, José Mojica Marins)
- A Praga (1979, José Mojica Marins)
- O Segredo da Múmia (1982, Ivan Cardoso)
- Meu Homem, Meu Amante (1984, Jean Garrett)
- No Mundo da Carochinha Volume I – Chapeuzinho Vermelho (1986, Wilson Rodrigues)
- No Mundo da Carochinha Volume II – Joãozinho e Maria (1986, Wilson Rodrigues)
- As Sete Vampiras (1986, Ivan Cardoso)
- O Gato de Botas Extraterrestre (1989, Wilson Rodrigues)
- O Escorpião Escarlate (1989, Ivan Cardoso), based on the radio serial As Aventuras do Anjo
- Um Lobisomem na Amazônia (2005, Ivan Cardoso), based on the novel A Amazônia Misteriosa by Gastão Cruls,

=== Radio ===
- Grande Teatro de Aventuras (1956–1958, PRA-7 Rádio Clube de Ribeirão Preto)
- Grande Teatro A-7 (1956–1958, PRA-7 Rádio Clube de Ribeirão Preto)

=== Television ===
- Quem Foi? (1961, TV Tupi, Canal 3, de Ribeirão Preto, 25 episodes)
- Além, Muito Além do Além (1967–1968, TV Bandeirantes, 34 episodes; directed by Antonino Seabra e Mário Pomponet)
- O Estranho Mundo de Zé do Caixão (1968, TV Tupi, twelve episodes; directed by Antônio Abujamra)

== Pulp magazines ==
- Policial em Revista
- X-9
- Meia Noite
- Agentes da Lei
- Suspense
- Garras da Lei
- Emoção
- Contos de Mistério
- Mistério Jacques Douglas
- Ação policial
- Série Negra (1969, Saber, two issues)
- Aventura e Mistério (1969, Saber one issue)
- Mistérios (1969–1970, Editora Prelúdio, three issues)

== Comics ==
- A Cripta (1968–1969, Editora Taika, five issues, artwork by Nico Rosso)
- O Estranho Mundo de Zé do Caixão (1969, Editora Prelúdio, four issues; artwork by Nico Rosso)
- Special Sexta-Feira 13 (1969, Editora Sublime, one issue; artwork by Nico Rosso)
- O Homem do Sapato Branco (1969, Editora Prelúdio, three issues; artwork by Eugênio Colonnese). He signed the stories with the pen name R. Bava
- Edição Gigante de Impacto (1969, Editora Prelúdio, one issue; artwork by Eugênio Colonnese)
- A Vida de Sílvio Santos (1969, Editora Prelúdio, one issue; artwork by Sérgio M. Lima)
- Histórias Que o Povo Conta (1970, Editora Prelúdio, three issues; artwork by Sérgio M. Lima)
- O Homem Que Matou o Homem Mau (1970, Editora Prelúdio, one issue; artwork by Sérgio M. Lima)
- Zé do Caixão no Reino do Terror (1970, Editora Prelúdio, two issues; artwork by Nico Rosso)
- O Filho de Satã (1970, Editora Taika, one issue; artwork by Nico Rosso). A graphic novel
- Carne Fresca para a Mesa! (1970, Editora Taika, one issue; artwork by Nico Rosso). A graphic novel
- Os Vampiros Não Praticam o Sexo! (1970, Editora Taika, one issue; artwork by Nico Rosso). A graphic novel
- Fantastykon Panorama do Irreal (1972, Edrel, two issues; artwork by Nico Rosso)
- Juvêncio, O Justiceiro(1968–1969, Editora Prelúdio, eight issues; artwork by Eugênio Colonnese e Rodolfo Zalla)
- O Gato (1967, Jotaesse Editora; artwork by Eugênio Colonnese)
- Spektro (Editora Vecchi)
- A Múmia (1977–1978, Bloch Editores, six issues artwork by Julio Shimamoto)
- Elvis Presley em Quadrinhos (1977, Bloch Editores, one issue; artwork by e José Menezes e Mário Lima)
- Frankenstein (1977, Bloch Editores, two issues; artwork by José Menezes)
- No Reino do Terror de R.F. Lucchetti (2001, Opera Graphica Editora, ne issue; artwork by Nico Rosso, Julio Shimamoto, Eugênio Colonnese, Rodolfo Zalla e Flávio Colin)
- 45 Anos de Velta (2017, artwork by Emir Ribeiro)
- A Vida e os Amores de Edgar Allan Poe (2018, Sebo Clepsidra; úone issue; artwork by Eduardo Schloesser)

== Books ==
- Música Secreta (1952, Edição do Autor)
- Noite Diabólica – Contos Macabros (1963, Editora Outubro), horror anthology
- O Dôbre Sinistro (1963, Editora Outubro), horror
- O Ouro dos Mortos (1963, Editora Outubro), adventure
- Fim-de-Semana com a Morte (1972, Cedibra), crime
- Confissões de uma Morta (1972, Cedibra), crime
- Cerimônia Macabra (1972, Cedibra), horror anthology
- Sombras do Mal (1973, Cedibra), crime with the pen name Sheila MacCarthy
- Os Amantes da Sra. Powers (1973, Cedibra), crime
- O Fantasma do Tio William (1974, Cedibra), romance
- O Caso do Manequim (1974, Cedibra), crime with the pen name Mark Donahue
- O Homem Que Criou o Mito (1974, Cedibra)
- Feiticeiras do Amor (1974, Cedibra), romance with the pen name Ricardo Veronese
- A Última Noite de Amor (1974, Cedibra), romance with the pen name Frank Luke
- Sete Ventres para o Demônio (1974, Cedibra), horror
- A Maldição do Sangue de Lobo (1974, Cedibra), horror
- As Máscaras do Pavor (1974, Cedibra), horror
- Museu dos Horrores (1974, Cedibra), horror
- Os Vampiros Não Fazem Sexo (1974, Cedibra), horror with the pen name Brian Stockler
- A Lua do Lobisomem (1974, Cedibra), horror with the pen name Terence Gray
- Os Olhos do Vampiro (1974, Cedibra), horror with the pen name Theodore Field
- A Escrava de Satanás (1974, Cedibra), horror
- A Herdeira Rebelde (1974, Cedibra) - romance
- No Domínio do Mistério (1975, Cedibra), horror with the pen name Terence Gray
- A Volta de Frankenstein (1975, Cedibra), horror with the pen name Mary Shelby
- O Emissário de Satã (1975, Cedibra), horror
- Nos Domínios de Drácula (1975, Cedibra), horror
- O Demônio Exorcista (1975, Cedibra), horror with the pen name Peter L. Brady
- Sexo de Encomenda (1975, Cedibra), crime
- A Princesa das Sombras (1975, Cedibra), horror with the pen name Isadora Highsmith
- Trágica Obsessão (1975, Cedibra), horror with the pen name Isadora Highsmith
- O Castelo da Dama de Azul (1975, Cedibra), horror with the pen name Isadora Highsmith
- Crepúsculo Sobre a Neve (1975, Cedibra), horror with the pen name Isadora Highsmith
- Fogo Sagrado (1975, Cedibra), horror with the pen name Isadora Highsmith
- O Fantasma de Greenstock (1975, Cedibra), horror with the pen name Isadora Highsmith
- A Filha da Noite (1975, Cedibra), horror with the pen name Isadora Highsmith
- Em Nome do Amor (1975, Cedibra), romance with the pen name Christine Gray
- O Solar dos Gansfields (1975, Cedibra), horror with the pen name Christine Gray
- Noites Brancas em Dravko (1976, Cedibra), horror publicado sob pseudônimo de Isadora Highsmith
- Um Álibi de Amor (1976, Cedibra), crime with the pen name Helen Barton
- A Justiça pelo Colt (1977, Cedibra), western with the pen name William Sharp
- A Cidade dos Corruptos (1977, Cedibra), crime with the pen name Ricardo Veronese
- Convite para a Morte (1977, Cedibra), crime with the pen name J. Luther Brown
- A Ronda da Morte (1977, Cedibra) – crime with the pen name J. Luther Brown
- Rota Sangrenta para Phoenix (1978, Cedibra), western with the pen name Lee Sheridan
- Os Amantes de Sabrina (1978, Cedibra) – romance with the pen name Marcelo Francis
- O Crime da Gaiola Dourada (1979, Difel), crime
- Sedução à Italiana (1980, ZIP Editora), crime with the pen name Janete Chantal
- As Virgens do Drácula (1980, Cedibra), horror with the pen name Erich Von Zagreb
- Gargantas Dilaceradas (1980, Cedibra), horror with the pen name Erich Von Zagreb
- A Noite do Vampiro (1980, Cedibra), horror with the pen name Erich Von Zagreb
- Orgia de Sangue (1980, Cedibra), horror with the pen name Erich Von Zagreb
- Sepulcro Maldito (1980, Cedibra), horror with the pen name Erich Von Zagreb
- Flor de Sangue (1980, Cedibra), horror with the pen name Erich Von Zagreb
- Cemitério sem Cruzes (1980, Cedibra), horror with the pen name Erich Von Zagreb
- Batismo das Feiticeiras (1980, Cedibra), horror with the pen name Erich Von Zagreb
- A Boneca dos Olhos Vazados (1980, Cedibra), horror with the pen name Erich Von Zagreb
- A Mansão do Fogo Eterno (1980, Cedibra), horror with the pen name Erich Von Zagreb
- Drácula (1987, Editora Cunha), horror/clássico de Bram Stocker recontado por Lucchetti
- Ivampirismo o Cinema em Pânico (1990, EBAL/Fundação do Cinema Brasileiro), with the screenplays of O Segredo da Múmia and As Sete Vampiras
- O Cavaleiro Solitário (1993, Editora Fittipaldi), western
- Ouro Maldito (1993, Editora Fittipaldi), western
- A Teia nas Sombras (1993, Editora Fittipaldi), crime
- O Segredo da Mansão (1994, Editora Fittipaldi), with the pen name Barbara Bialley
- Uma Sombra do Passado (1995, Editora Fittipaldi), mystery and suspense
- A Noite Tudo Encobre (1995, Editora Fittipaldi), crime with the pen name Frank King
- A Morte no Varieté (1995, Editora Fittipaldi), crime with the pen name Frank King
- Quem Quer Brincar Comigo? (1995, Editora Fittipaldi), crime with the pen name Frank King
- Os Eleitos da Morte (1995, Editora Fittipaldi), with the pen name Barbara Bialley
- Depois do Beijo, a Morte (1995, Editora Fittipaldi), crime with the pen name Barbara Bialley
- O Mestre da Vingança (1995, Editora Fittipaldi), with the pen name Constance Gray
- Um Morto em Minha Cama (1996, Editora Fittipaldi), crime with the pen name Constance Gray
- O Homem que Caiu do Céu (1996, Editora Fittipaldi), with the pen name Constance Gray
- Os Extraordinários (2003, Opera Graphica Editora), action and adventure anthology
- Emir Ribeiro Ilustra Fantasmagorias de R. F. Lucchetti (2013, Editora Devaneio), horror anthology
- O Escorpião Escarlate, novelização do roteiro original (2015, Editora Laços), crime /original screenplay for the movie
- As Sete Vampiras (2016, Editora Laços), horror/original screenplay for the movie
- Onde Está Blondie? (2016, Editorial Corvo), satire/original unpublished film screenplay
- A Filha de Drácula (2017, Editorial Corvo), horror/original unpublished film screenplay
- 5 Bonecas de Olhos Vazados (2017, Editorial Corvo), crime and mystery
- Poemas de Vampiros (2018, Clepsidra), poetry
- Arthur, o Nascimento de uma Lenda (2018, Editorial Corvo)
- Procure a Mulher! (2018, Editorial Corvo), short story anthology
- A Mansão de Sorona (2019, Editorial Corvo), short story anthology (some new, some reeditions)
- O Último Manuscrito do Dr. Watson (2019, Editorial Corvo), crime
- Mulheres-feras da Amazônia (2019, Editorial Corvo), horror (based on the original screenplay for the film Um Lobisomem na Amazônia (2005)
