= The Strange World of Coffin Joe =

1968 film directed by José Mojica Marins

- Original film poster
- Directed by: Jose Mojica Marins
- Written by: Jose Mojica Marins; Rubens Francisco Luchetti
- Produced by: Jose Mojica Marins
- Cinematography: Giorgio Attili
- Edited by: Eduardo Llorente
- Music by: Beto Strada
- Production company: Iberia Filmes
- Distributed by: Iberia Filmes
- Release date: 25 November 1968
- Running time: 80 minutes
- Country: Brazil
- Language: Portuguese

The Strange World of Coffin Joe (Portuguese: O Estranho Mundo de Zé do Caixão) is a 1968 Brazilian anthology horror film directed by José Mojica Marins, who also plays his alter ego Zé do Caixão (in English, Coffin Joe). The film is a collection of three short films titled O Fabricante de Bonecas (The Dollmaker), Tara (Obsession), and Ideologia (Theory). Joe only appears briefly in the role of a horror host, introducing the segments, and the film is not a part of the Coffin Joe trilogy (At Midnight I'll Take Your Soul, This Night I Will Possess Your Corpse, and Embodiment of Evil). The hymn-like title song was written by Marins, and performed by Edson Lopes and Brazilian samba band Titulares do Ritmo.

== The segments and cast ==
=== The Dollmaker (O Fabricante de Bonecas) ===
A story about a local doll maker who is very popular for realistic dolls, which are made by his four beautiful daughters. A group of robbers, overhearing that the doll maker does not keep his money in a bank, proceed to attack the old man in his shop. The doll maker seemingly faints during the attack and the attackers try to rape his seductive daughters. Resistive at first, each of the women begins to notice the "beautiful eyes" of the attackers and become accepting and even encouraging of their advances. When the recovered dollmaker appears in the room, each daughter quickly and silently takes leave of their attackers, leaving them to be shot and killed by their father. The following scenes reveal that this is the technique by which the doll maker obtains the realistic eyes for his dolls. (18 minutes)

Cast: Vany Miller, Veronica Krimann, Paula Ramos, Esmeralda Ruchel, Luís Sérgio Person, Mário Lima, Rosalvo Caçador, Toni Cardi, Messias de Mello, Leila de Oliveira.

=== Obsession (Tara) ===
A poor and unattractive balloon seller with a foot fetish becomes obsessed with a beautiful woman who he sees passing daily. He begins to follow her and observe her activities, when, watching her wedding, he sees her murdered. After being turned away from her funeral, he later returns and breaks into the mausoleum where her coffin is placed. Opening the coffin, he removes her burial wedding dress, has sex with the body and performs foot fetishism. After redressing her, he places a pair of beautiful new shoes on her feet, shoes that the balloon seller retained after she dropped them while shopping, hoping one day to return them to her.

Cast: George Michel Serkeis, Iris Bruzzi, Arnaldo Brasil, Ana Maria, Pontes Santos, Antonia Siqueira, Guilermina Martins, Wilson dos Santos, Bettyr Dorffer, Luis Carlos Vianna.

=== Theory (Ideologia) ===
Psychotic professor Oãxiac Odéz (José Mojica Marins) invites a rival professor and his wife to his home, then imprisons them and subjects them to a series of sadistic ordeals, starvation, and displays of shocking rituals involving sadism and cannibalism, in an attempt to prove that the instinct overcomes reason and love. (34 minutes)

Cast: José Mojica Marins, Osvaldo de Souza, Nidi Reis, Nivaldo de Lima, Salvador do Amaral, Kátia Dumont, Dario Santos, Carla Sotis, Jean Silva (Garret), Palito, Laércio Laurelli (doubling as the voice of José Mojica Marins).
