= The Bloody Exorcism of Coffin Joe =

1974 film directed by José Mojica Marins

- Theatrical release poster
- Directed by: José Mojica Marins
- Written by: José Mojica Marins; Adriano Stuart; Rubens Francisco Luchetti
- Produced by: Anibal Massaini Neto
- Starring: José Mojica Marins
- Cinematography: Antonio Meliande
- Edited by: Carlos Coimbra
- Music by: Geraldo José
- Production company: Cinedistri
- Distributed by: Cinedistri
- Release date: December 23, 1974
- Running time: 100 minutes
- Country: Brazil
- Language: Portuguese

The Bloody Exorcism of Coffin Joe (Portuguese: Exorcismo Negro, lit. 'Black Exorcism') is a 1974 Brazilian horror film directed by José Mojica Marins. Marins is also known by his alter ego Zé do Caixão (in English, Coffin Joe). It is one of several Marins' films that feature Joe as a major character, although it is not considered part of the "Coffin Joe trilogy" (At Midnight I'll Take Your Soul, This Night I Will Possess Your Corpse, and Embodiment of Evil).

The movie is filmed in Marins' trademark b movie style, including the use of inconsistent visual and sound editing, a bizarre audio track, and extremely low budget effects.

== Plot ==
Playing himself, and having filmed the final scene of his most recent movie, Jose Mojica Marins gives an interview discussing his plans for his next film. After an interviewer asks Marins about the true existence of Coffin Joe, Marins replies "Coffin Joe does not exist". A camera light then explodes. He states he will leave for vacation at the country home of his friend Alvaro to write the script for his next film, which he plans on calling "The Demon Exorcist".

He arrives at Alvaro's. He is met there by Mr. Julio, father of Alvaro, tending his flowers. Marins is taken to the house and greeted by Alvaro, his wife Lucia, and their three daughters: Betinha, Luciana, and Vilma. Vilma is soon to be married to her fiancee Carlos.

Soon odd things occur around the house and property such as winds blowing and horses being frightened, and that night Mr. Júlio frightens everyone when he begins tearing off his shirt and declaring in a frenzied voice that has come to collect a debt. Marins investigates the house that night and finds a locked hallway, but is attacked by flying books and the lights turn off. Betinha sees tarantulas and a snake in the Christmas tree. During these events the scene cuts to a strange woman who carries a white cat and is surrounded by occult figurines and symbols, and has a framed portrait of Coffin Joe behind her on the wall.

Lucia admits to Marins that Vilma is promised to a local witch in the marriage to Eugenio, who is the son of Satan. Vilma is actually the daughter of the witch, but Lucia obtained her as a newborn due to her husband's infertility and faked the pregnancy with the promise to raise Vilma and return her as an adult for the marriage to Eugenio. The recent occurrences in the house are the result of the witch's anger at Vilma's engagement to Carlos.

Carlos is injured in a mysterious car accident and Lucia faints fearing it to be the action of the witch. The scene then shows the witch biting the head off a rooster as a sacrifice. Marins then returns to his room and hears Vilma moaning in the next room. He finds Vilma wandering naked and she strikes him on the head.

Marins wakens in a room with a black mass in progress. He sees the red-gowned hooded figures of Luciana, Mr. Julio and the witch, as well as Vilma and Eugenio side by side. The constant sounds of tortured screams fills the room. After the dancers raise their arms, some sparks fly and Coffin Joe appears. Marins is shocked to see his creation in flesh and blood, shouting rants and pronouncements typical of Coffin Joe, such as "may the blood of those who don't deserve to live burst out of their bodies!", and "may lightning burn the scum!".

Coffin Joe walks up a staircase of human bodies to witness the festivities, mainly topless women dancing exotically to the constant screams of torture and terror that fill the background. When the wedding starts, Coffin Joe places the rings on Carlos' and Vilma's fingers, announcing "may pain and blood spread among us!". The scenes that follow are a series of vivid depictions of torture, mutilation, dismemberment, and live cannibalism. After forcing Marins from the room, the ceremony takes place, Marins hearing it from the next room. When Marins hears the screams of the youngest daughter Betinha being taken to the ceremony in order to be sacrificed, he returns with a crucifix he found fallen from the wall, and brandishes it saying “I believe in God!”, preventing Betinha's murder. He then uses the crucifix to quickly exorcise the family members of their influence from Coffin Joe.

Marins and Coffin Joe struggle. After Marins is knocked to the ground, a transparent image of Coffin Joe is seen leaving Marins' body. The witch and Eugenio both die as results of Marins' impromptu Christian pronouncements.

Marins wakes in his room clutching the crucifix. He goes to check on the family members and sees Mr. Julio setting the table for Christmas dinner, Vilma and Carlos in a loving embrace, and Betinha and Luciana opening presents. Marins silently takes his leave as they sing Christmas carols.

The film ends with a shot of Betinha's face with a serious expression. The camera zooms in to the reflection in her eye which shows Coffin Joe who is laughing amid the sounds of tortured screams.

== Cast ==
- Agenor Alves
- Alcione Mazzeo as Luciana
- Ariane Arantes as Wilma
- Geórgia Gomide as Lúcia
- Joffre Soares as Júlio
- José Mojica Marins as himself/Coffin Joe
- Luiz Karlo
- Marcelo Picchi as Carlos
- Marisol Marins as Betinha
- Rubens Francisco
- Walter Stuart as Álvaro
- Wanda Kosmo as Malvina

== Release ==
The Bloody Exorcism of Coffin Joe was released on December 23, 1974. At the time, there were people hired to fake illness and pretend to pass out during its exhibitions.

== Reception ==
In a contemporary review, Jornal Do Brasil gave the film 2/5 stars, calling it "A naive visual game of scaring people with optical illusions".
