= Mário Lima =

Mário Lima is a Brazilian actor and film and television producer. He produced and acted in many films by Brazilian filmmaker José Mojica Marins.

== Filmography ==
- My Destiny in Your Hands as Actor
- Adventurer's Fate as Actor
- At Midnight I'll Take Your Soul (also: producer)
- This Night I'll Possess Your Corpse (also: producer)
- Awakening of the Beast as Volunteer (also: producer)
- The Strange World of Coffin Joe, segment The Dollmaker as burglar/rapist
- Trilogy of Terror (1968 film) (actor, production assistant) Macabre Nightmare
- The Prophet of Hunger as Actor (also: continuity)
- End of Man as The lover
- Embodiment of Evil as Funeral attendee
