= Ivan Cardoso (footballer) =

Portuguese footballer

Personal information
- Full name: Ivan Magalhães Miguel Cardoso
- Date of birth: 13 November 2003 (age 22)
- Place of birth: Porto, Portugal
- Height: 1.80 m (5 ft 11 in)
- Position: Goalkeeper

Team information
- Current team: Porto B
- Number: 61

Youth career
- 2011–2013: Bairro do Falcão
- 2013–2014: Torrão
- 2014–2020: Porto

Senior career*
| Years | Team | Apps | (Gls) |
| 2020– | Porto B | 2 | (0) |

International career^{‡}
| 2018 | Portugal U15 | 3 | (0) |
| 2019 | Portugal U16 | 2 | (0) |
| 2019 | Portugal U17 | 1 | (0) |
- * Club domestic league appearances and goals as of 26 June 2023 ‡ National team caps and goals as of 25 January 2021

Ivan Magalhães Miguel Cardoso (born 13 November 2003) is a Portuguese professional football player who plays as a goalkeeper for F.C. Porto B.

== Professional career ==
Cardoso made his professional debut with F.C. Porto B in a 1-1 Liga Portugal 2 tie with Benfica B on 25 January 2021.
