= The Universe of Mojica Marins =

1978 film directed by Ivan Cardoso

- Title screen
- Directed by: Ivan Cardoso
- Starring: José Mojica Marins; Satã Leyart
- Release date: 1978
- Running time: 26 minutes
- Country: Brazil
- Language: Portuguese

The Universe of Mojica Marins (original title: O Universo de Mojica Marins) is a 1978 Brazilian short documentary film by Ivan Cardoso. The film features Brazilian filmmaker, director, screenwriter, film and television actor and media personality José Mojica Marins. The film follows Marins (as himself) in public appearances and includes commentary by Marins, as well as his mother and film associates and includes scenes from his films.

== Cast ==
- José Mojica Marins (as himself)
- Madame Satã
- Nilcemar Leyart
