= Adventurer's Fate =

1958 film directed by José Mojica Marins

- Theatrical release poster
- Directed by: Jose Mojica Marins
- Written by: Jose Mojica Marins
- Produced by: Jose Mojica Marins; Augusto Pereira
- Starring: Jose Mojica Marins; Mário Lima
- Cinematography: Honorio Marin
- Edited by: Luiz Elias
- Music by: João da Silva
- Production company: Indústria Cinematográfica Apolo
- Distributed by: Polifilmes; Satélite Filmes
- Release date: December 19, 1958
- Running time: 88 minutes
- Country: Brazil
- Language: Portuguese

Adventurer's Fate (Portuguese: A Sina do Aventureiro) is a 1958 Brazilian western film written, directed by, and starring José Mojica Marins. Marins is also known by his alter ego Zé do Caixão (in English, Coffin Joe).

== Plot ==
After running away from a shoot out, the outlaw Jaime falls to the edge of a river, where he is helped by two beautiful young women. He becomes involved romantically with Dorinha, daughter of a farmer and, because of his love for her, kills her father. When escaping the arrest, Jaime has to face Xavier, a bloodthirsty outlaw who plans to avenge the father of Dorinha. Marins appears as Gregorio, a gunman of the flock of Xavier. Marins also wrote the lyrics of the ten songs of the soundtrack. In 1964, the film was relaunched with an extra dose of sex, having included a new scenes with about ten minutes in the brothel.

== Cast ==
- Acácio de Lima
- Alaert Leão
- Amids Martinez
- Augusto de Cervantes
- Enibalú
- Graveto
- José Mojica Marins as Gregorio
- Mário Lima
- Ruth Ferreira
- Shirley Alves
- Tônia Eletra
