= My Destiny In Your Hands =

1963 film directed by José Mojica Marins

- Theatrical release poster
- Directed by: Jose Mojica Marins
- Written by: Jose Mojica Marins; Acácio de Lima
- Produced by: Augusto Pereira; Leonardo Russo
- Starring: Jose Mojica Marins; Mario Lima
- Cinematography: Ruy Santos
- Edited by: Maximo Barro
- Music by: Herminio Giménez
- Production company: Apolo Indústria Cinematográfica
- Release date: July 8, 1963
- Running time: 80 minutes
- Country: Brazil
- Language: Portuguese

My Destiny In Your Hands (Portuguese: Meu Destino em Tuas Mãos) is a 1963 Brazilian drama film written, directed by, and starring José Mojica Marins. Marins is also known by his alter ego Zé do Caixão (in English, Coffin Joe).

== Synopsis ==
A husband comes home drunk and beats his wife. His son Carlito tries to defend his mother with a broomstick. The father turns to the boy menacingly and threatens "I'll kill you!". Terrified, the boy flees with four other young children, all poor and suffering abuse and exploitation at home by their families. The children try to live and survive life on the streets on the outskirts of São Paulo.

Carlito (Franquito), the eldest of them, plays guitar and sings to make money. Marins composed three of the ten songs composed for Carlito in the film.

== Cast ==
- Alvino Cassiano
- Augusto de Cervantes
- Carmem Marins
- Delmo Demarcos
- Franquito as Carlito
- José Mojica Marins as the Father
- Mário Lima
- Nivaldo de Lima
- Nilton Batista
- Nivaldo Guimarães
