= Perversion (film) =

1979 film directed by José Mojica Marins

- Theatrical release poster
- Directed by: Jose Mojica Marins
- Written by: Jose Mojica Marins; Crounel Martins
- Produced by: José Mojica Marins; Melquíades
- Starring: Jose Mojica Marins; Arlete Moreira
- Cinematography: Giorgio Attili
- Edited by: Nilcemar Leyart
- Music by: Oscar Marcil
- Production company: Produções Cinematográficas Zé do Caixão
- Distributed by: Central de Distribuição de Filmes Cinematográficos
- Release date: 1979
- Running time: 100 minutes
- Country: Brazil
- Language: Portuguese

Perversion (also released as Perversão and Estupro!) is a 1979 Brazilian exploitation film directed by José Mojica Marins. Marins is also known by his alter ego Zé do Caixão (in English, Coffin Joe).

== Plot ==
Vitório Palestrina is a playboy millionaire who passes his days having sex with, abusing, and discarding women in a small village. After seducing a young woman named Silvia, he brutally rapes her, biting off one of her nipples in the process. He keeps the nipple in a glass case as a trophy. When his actions become public knowledge, he is actually admired for what he has done, while his victim is ostracized and tormented by the townspeople.

Palestrina is acquitted of rape on the grounds of insufficient evidence and laughs at the victim when the judge gives the verdict. He commemorates his triumph with a party at which he proudly displays the severed nipple to his guests. Palestrina continues to seduce other young women until he develops a passion for Veronica, a beautiful young medical student who is not as susceptible to his charm.

To obtain Veronica's love and loyalty, Palestrina must endure a more traditional courtship: Veronica requires him to proclaim love and propose marriage before she relents. When he finally does, Veronica allows Palestrina to consummate their affair with a long, passionate episode of sex. As he settles into a peaceful post coital state, Veronica calmly reaches into her purse and removes a surgical knife with which she castrates him. She then has flashbacks which reveal that Veronica is Silvia's sister.

Naked and covered in blood, Veronica slowly bandages Palestrina's wounds and says, "You promised me everything. I accepted." All the while, she envisions future times of bliss with her beloved sister.

== Cast ==
- José Mojica Marins as Vittorio Palestrina
- Arlete Moreira as Veronica
- Ricardo Petráglia
- Nadia Destro
- Elza Leonetti
- Diva Medrek
- Jaime Cortez
- Mara Prado
