= Ivan Cardoso (director) =

Brazilian filmmaker

- Born: 1952 (age 73–74); Rio de Janeiro, Brazil
- Occupation: Film director
- Known for: Creator of the "terrir" (comedy horror) style

Ivan Cardoso (born 1952 in Rio de Janeiro) is a Brazilian filmmaker.

His peculiar style is called terrir (a portmanteau in Portuguese of terror + rir= to laugh), which is a synonym for comedy horror in Portuguese. It blends classic horror fiction tropes with elements of popular Brazilian pornochanchada comedy, and parodies of the most widespread Brazilian stereotypes.

He also produced a documentary film about his friend and inspirator, José "Coffin Joe" Mojica Marins.

== Selected filmography ==
- 1970 - Nosferato no Brasil (Nosferatu in Brazil)
- 1977 - O Universo de Mojica Marins
- 1982 - O Segredo da Múmia
- 1986 - As Sete Vampiras
- 1990 - O Escorpião Escarlate (The Scarlet Scorpion)
- 2005 - Um Lobisomem na Amazônia (A werewolf in Amazon)
- 2005 - A Marca do Terrir
