= Embodiment of Evil =

2008 film directed by José Mojica Marins

- Theatrical release poster
- Directed by: José Mojica Marins
- Written by: Jose Mojica Marins; Dennison Ramalho
- Produced by: Paulo Sacramento; Caio Gullane; Fabiano Gullane; Debora Ivanov; Gabriel Lacerda
- Starring: Jose Mojica Marins; Milhem Cortaz; Rui Rizende; Jece Valadão; Adriano Stuart; José Celso Martinez Corrêa; Helena Ignez
- Cinematography: José Roberto Eliezer
- Edited by: Paulo Sacramento
- Music by: André Abujamra; Márcio Nigro
- Production companies: Olhos de Cão; Gullane Filmes
- Distributed by: 20th Century Fox
- Release date: August 8, 2008; Brazil theater premiere
- Running time: 94 minutes
- Country: Brazil
- Language: Portuguese
- Budget: R$1,800,000
- Box office: R$184,403 ($78,462)

Embodiment of Evil (Portuguese: Encarnação do Demônio, lit. 'Incarnation of the Demon') is a 2008 Brazilian horror film directed by and starring José Mojica Marins. The film was co-written with Dennison Ramalho. It is the third installment in his Coffin Joe trilogy, featuring Mojica Marins reprising his role as Zé do Caixão (in English, Coffin Joe). The film is preceded by At Midnight I'll Take Your Soul (1964) and This Night I'll Possess Your Corpse (1967).

A flashback scene in the film reveals that the young Coffin Joe (portrayed in the scene by Raymond Castile) survived after submerging in a swamp at the end of the previous film. After serving 40 years in a prison mental ward, Coffin Joe (José Mojica Marins) is released to the streets of modern-day São Paulo. Immediately after his release, Coffin Joe renews his lifelong obsession to sire a male child with a woman whom he perceives to be of exceptional qualities capable of continuing his bloodline, which he feels to be "superior" above all others.

Embodiment of Evil was filmed over roughly forty days at various locations in São Paulo. Like Mojica Marins' previous films, the effects are largely performed by hand rather than provided through computer generation. The film premiered in Brazilian theaters on August 8, 2008 and screened in twenty festivals worldwide despite its poor box office performance. It won awards at five festivals, and was nominated for awards at two others.

== Plot ==
After being released from the prison mental ward, Coffin Joe is greeted at the gate by his old and loyal servant Bruno (Rui Rezende), who takes him to a secluded basement below a favela in São Paulo. As well as Bruno, the hideout is populated by four fanatics who are obsessed with Coffin Joe's history and ideas, and have been waiting and preparing for his arrival in order that they may faithfully serve him. After questioning their motives and testing their loyalty, Coffin Joe immediately orders the followers to begin kidnapping women so he can renew his murderous quest for "the continuation of the blood", his lifelong obsession to find who he determines to be a perfect woman who will bear him a son. His first victim is Dr. Hilda (Cléo De Páris), a controversial eugenicist who Bruno kidnaps. Coffin Joe tests her will by injecting her with drugs and she has hallucinations of Coffin Joe cutting off her buttock and presenting it to her after which she willingly eats it. Meanwhile, Coronel Claudiomiro Pontes (Jece Valadão), a fervently Roman Catholic police captain who holds an old grudge against Coffin Joe for blinding his eye, and Father Eugênio (Milhem Cortaz), a mentally unstable priest (the son of one of Coffin Joe's past victims, Dr. Rudolfo in At Midnight I'll Take Your Soul) learn about Coffin Joe's release, and decide to join forces to seek Coffin Joe and kill him once and for all.

On his first night, Coffin Joe starts to be haunted by ghostly visions of his previous victims, including Terezinha and Lenita from At Midnight I'll Take Your Soul, and Laura from This Night I'll Possess Your Corpse. However, he convinces himself that they are just his imagination although they continue to haunt him throughout the film. He later singles out a young gypsy woman named Elena (Nara Sakarê), who has also been intrigued with him since his appearance at the favela. Elena's aunts, Cabíria (Helena Ignez) and Lucrécia (Débora Muniz), knowing of his evil history, perform a ritual to protect Elena from Coffin Joe and place a curse on him. After Joe kills the two aunts, Elena offers herself to him, although while having sex with her he has a vision where he finds himself in another dimension which is a bloody, intestine-like maze. There he is met by a figure called the Mystifier (José Celso Martinez Corrêa), who takes him to an arid, surreal landscape called Purgatory. The Mystifier shows Coffin Joe horrific visions of human depravity, suffering, and perversion, as well as a female figure of Coffin Joe's death. Greatly disturbed, Joe sends his followers to quickly kidnap several more women and proceeds to torture them through sadistic ordeals to test their endurance and willingness to succumb to his perceived superiority.

When the police find Coffin Joe's hideout that night they find it deserted, except for the gruesome remains of his victims. Joe escapes through the dark woods with Colonel Pontes and Father Eugênio after him. Joe arrives at the closed amusement park, Playcenter, where Joe kills the policemen, but is wounded by Father Eugênio, who impales Coffin Joe through the heart with a large crucifix. Although relieved thinking he has killed Coffin Joe, Father Eugênio is immediately pursued by shadows and the voice of Coffin Joe as he leaves the amusement park. As Father Eugênio leaves, Elena appears. She pulls the crucifix out of Coffin Joe, removes her clothes and has sexual intercourse with him. The final scene takes place at Coffin Joe's funeral, where it is revealed that Coffin Joe achieved his goal in the end, as the women who survived his ordeals, including Hilda and Elena, gathered at his funeral, are all pregnant.

== Cast ==
- José Mojica Marins as Zé do Caixão (Coffin Joe)
- Raymond Castile as Young Coffin Joe
- Jece Valadão as Colonel Claudiomiro Pontes
- Adriano Stuart as Captain Oswaldo Pontes
- Milhem Cortaz as Father Eugênio
- Rui Rezende as Bruno
- José Celso Martinez Corrêa as Mystifier
- Cristina Aché as Lucy Pontes
- Helena Ignez as Cabíria
- Débora Muniz as Lucrécia
- Thais Simi as Maíra
- Cléo de Páris as Dr. Hilda
- Nara Sakarê as Elena
- Giulio Lopes as Mário
- Eduardo Chagras as Emiliano
- Luís Melo as Seu Américo
- Karina Battis as Suzy
- Guta Ruiz as Terezinha
- Geanine Marques as Death

== Production ==
Production on Embodiment of Evil spanned six years, including Dennison Ramalho re-writing the script with Mojica Marins. Despite Mojica Marins stating that Romalho would be a "worthy successor", Romalho convinced the director that Coffin Joe should be the center of Embodiment of Evil.

Mojica Marins' son, Crounel Marins, served as assistant director.

The actual filming took place over roughly 40 days, during which actor Jece Valadão died of kidney and breathing problems. All but two of the scenes involving his character, Colonel Pontes, had been filmed prior to his death, though a new character had to be written into the film to maintain continuity. Filming began on November 4, 2006, and concluded on December 20, 2006.

Embodiment of Evil was shot on location in São Paulo, with the sequence which includes Coffin Joe's death being filmed at the Playcenter amusement park. A sewer in Santana had been chosen as the location for the scene involving the naked Iemanjá, but was ultimately abandoned due to not being able to control the lighting. The Purgatory scenes had to be filmed in one day on location in a sand quarry in Itaquaquecetuba due to budget constraints.

Leny Dark filmed the scene involving 3000 cockroaches, during which she had to be transported to the hospital as one had entered her ear canal. In addition to the cockroaches, the film utilized 30 to 40 slugs, 20 spiders, 10 rats, 6 snakes, 3 lizards, and 2 bats. There were 650 extras employed, 180 of which were involved in a single scene.

Crew members on the film were sometimes unable to stay throughout the filming of an entire scene. The pig from which Jannete Tomiita steps in the movie had been killed the day of filming that scene, which had to be shot multiple times because she slipped in the blood exiting the cadaver. An actress using the pseudonym Milze From Hell had her lips sewn shut on set without anesthesia; the scene was filmed as a continuous shot with no cuts. Manoel Garcia Salvado Neto, whose nickname is Freak Garcia, said enduring the four hours of makeup to cover his tattoos was worse than the scene he was filmed in - which also took four hours - where he was suspended from the ceiling by multiple hooks puncturing his back.

Chubb Limited's Brazil branch, along with Brüder Consultoria, designed the insurance policy that covered the film in the event of extra expenses or other material loss, including any expenses caused by illness, injury, or death.

Nara Sakarê, whose scene in the film involves corpses dripping blood onto her and Mojica Marins while the pair are engaged in intercourse, was confirmed to be pregnant several months after the filming ended.

Costumes for Embodiment of Evil were designed by David Parizotti and Alexandre Herchcovitch. Parizotti used recycled materials in making the costumes of Coffin Joe's servants, using tire rubber and heavy canvas. Herchcovitch considered the construction of Zé do Caixão's outfit to simply be refining, having a specialist make the top hat, and making the suit from cashmere wool and the shirts from fine cotton. José Celso Martinez Corrêa taught a fashion design workshop during which the 40 students made the pieces of his costumes. The costume budget was R$15,000.

Embodiment of Evil marked the first horror film for André Aburamjra, who created the music alongside Márcio Nigro. The soundtrack consisted of 19 songs, which were made available through MySpace.

=== Time gap between films ===
In April 1967, announcements regarding the coming production of Embodiment of Evil through Mojica Marins' production company Produções Cinematográficas Ibéria run out of an abandoned synagogue in Brás resulted in approximately 100 "poor young women" arriving to audition. Initial rounds of tests administered by Mojica Marins included participating in a simulated wake and being subjected to spiders, rats, frogs, and owls, but eventually evolved to kissing a real human skull, walking through a cemetery after midnight, eating a live cockroach, and hitting Mojica Marins in the face with an armadillo tail whip. Afterward, the Public Entertainment Division (DPP) claimed that Mojica Marins didn't have a permit for the auditions, claiming that they were instead rehearsed performances. In response to a second notice regarding the need for a license, Mojica Marins announced a second round of auditions for August 11, 1967. More than 150 people turned out, including John Herbert, who left the debacle, furious, when a dentist was expected to extract one person's teeth using pliers without administering anesthesia. The DPP inspectors arrived shortly afterward to shut everything down. On August 14, Mojica Marins and his attorneys were informed that he could not continue testing nor begin filming until he obtained additional permits. Nine days later, Mojica Marins recorded a television interview in which he stated he was then filming Embodiment of Evil.

A. P. Galante, in October 1967, went to Mojica Marins to discuss another film for the franchise, but the project owner, Augusto Pereira, refused, leaving Mojica Marins and Galante to work together on Trilogy of Terror and shelving Embodiment of Evil. In 1979, Mojica Marins stated that he intended to run advertisements in São Paulo once again to start casting for Embodiment of Evil.

When asked about the length of time between films, Mojica Marins stated that he had been able to return to making movies as a result of receiving R$500,000 from Governor Geraldo Alckmin in 2003. This was not, however, sufficient to fund the film, and Mojica Marins secured another R$1,000,000 from President Lula. More specifically, the Brazilian dictatorship had imprisoned Mojica Marins. When he was eventually released, the original producer died. The next producer to sign on to the project died of throat cancer before investing any funds. A budget of R$1,500,000 procured through Ivan Novais, producer of Occult City, fell through when he died on the first day of filming in 1998.

In addition to financial considerations, Mojica Marins faced the censorship of the dictatorship which had required changes to the ending of This Night I'll Possess Your Corpse. Mojica Marins' work in pornography over the interim decades resulted in critics expressing scorn for his work, and the censors' continued to disapprove of his films as a result of his focus on pushing social taboos.

To canonically explain the more than four decade gap between films two and three of the trilogy, Conrad Editora published a graphic novel titled Prontuário 666 by Samuel Casal and Adriana Brunstein, and boasting eight illustrators. Released in September 2008, it revealed Coffin Joe's real name as well as providing details on the experiments conducted on other inmates while he was imprisoned.

=== Previous incarnations ===
Mojica Marins had already partially conceived the script in 1965, which he intended to end with an announcement of a fourth installment, The Lament of the Wandering Spirits (Portuguese: O Lamento dos Espíritos Errantes). A 1988 incomplete script already had a producer on board (Augusto de Cervantes), as well as an additional screenwriter (Aldenoura de Sá Porto), under the working title Lucifer's Incarnations (Portuguese: Encarnaçãoes de Lúcifer). The project went unproduced after de Cervantes' death, and the plot with minor name changes became Demonic Trinity (Portuguese: Trindade Demoníaca) in 1991, which was also unreleased.

In a 1994 interview, Mojica Marins revealed that the original intention had been to have five parts, where the last three had him traversing Purgatory (Embodiment of Evil), Limbo (The Lament of the Wandering Spirits), and Paradise (The Devil's Tomb), the last of which would have Coffin Joe's permanent death.

== Release ==
20th Century Fox picked up the distribution rights for Embodiment of Evil for all of Latin America and Portugal in 2007, during Cannes.

The trailer for the film leaked online in August 2007, days after Mojica Marins had predicted it would happen while sitting for an interview with Alexandra Farah.

Originally, Embodiment of Evil had been scheduled to premier on March 13, 2008, Mojica Marins' 72nd birthday. In July 2008, the film screened at the Paulínia Film Festival. The film premiered in Brazil theaters on August 8, 2008, a date chosen by Mojica Marins for its cabalistic meaning.

On August 29, 2008, Embodiment of Evil played at the Venice Film Festival in a non-competing slot. It screened in Portugal in September 2008 at the Lisbon International Horror Film Festival where Mojica Marins was one of the special guests. Between November 6–16, 2008, Embodiment of Evil was one of the films screened at the Mar del Plata International Film Festival. Mojica Marins once again appeared in person, at the 49th Thessaloniki International Film Festival to present the film for screening, between November 14–23, 2008. Between November 20–30, 2008, it screened as an official selection at the Stockholm International Film Festival.

Programa Cinema do Brasil included the film in the screenings at Berlinale between February 5–15, 2009. It was one of 417 films screened at the 11th BAFICI festival between March 25 and April 5, 2009 in Buenos Aires, playing at the MALBA at midnight. It screened in the spring "Back to Basics" session of the twice yearly Night Visions festival in Finland between April 3–5, 2009. It screened at the 27th Brussels International Film Festival between April 9–21, 2009. As part of the Programa Cinema do Brasil, it was screened at Cannes between May 13–24, 2009. It played at the Majestic Crest Theater as part of the Los Angeles Film Festival between June 18–28, 2009. The film was also screened at the 2009 Fantasia International Film Festival, presented by Mojica Marins and Dennison Romalho.

It opened in theaters in London on July 4, 2009. Embodiment of Evil was one of the films screened at the inaugural New Zealand International Film Festival between July 17 and August 2, 2009. It screened at Toronto After Dark on August 15, 2009. Between August 19–30, 2009, it screened at the Macabro International Horror Film Festival of Mexico City [es]. Embodiment of Evil screened at the Strange Festival in Paris between September 4–13, 2009.

It released in Germany in September 2009, though it was missing eight minutes of the original release. Embodiment of Evil screened at the International Horror and Sci-Fi Film Festival on October 16 and 18, 2009. The film was screened at Sainte-Maxime International Horror Film Festival between October 24–31, 2009. The film was screened at Festival otrlého diváka in the Czech Republic on February 10, 2010.

Synapse Films released Embodiment of Evil on DVD and Blu-ray in 2011. They had acquired U.S. distribution rights in 2009. Arrow Films distributed a restored version of the film on January 15, 2024 in the U.S. and the U.K. The agreement reached with Mojica Marins' heirs provided them distribution rights worldwide, save for the U.S. and the U.K., where the rights will revert to the heirs in 2031.

The Synapse Blu-ray includes an almost 32-minute "Making of" featurette and footage from the 2009 Fantasia International Film Festival showing the presentation as well as Mojica Marins' speech afterward, as well as the theatrical trailer.

The film was re-released in 4K in Brazil in October 2024 in a free screening at the Palácio das Artes in Belo Horizante. The restored versions aired in the city of São Paulo in December 2024, screened at the Moreira Salles Institute.

== Box office ==
Embodiment of Evil only brought in R$184,403 through 2012. Eugênio Puppo, the curator of the Banco do Brasil Cultural Center exhibition on horror cinema and head of Heco Productions, attributed this to the divorcing of Coffin Joe's characterization in the film from his earlier incarnations in the series.

== Critical reception ==
When Embodiment of Evil premiered at the Paulínia Film Festival, several members of the audience were unable to watch the entire film, literally becoming ill while viewing it. However, this comprised only 74 of the attendees, who almost filled the 1,350-seat theater. Reviewing the film after seeing it at Paulínia, O Estado de S. Paulo 's Luiz Zanin Oricchio praised the editing, cinematography, and music. Zanin Oricchio made special mention of Mojica Marins' lack of CGI use; the critters in the film are very real (including the rat). Zanin Oricchio also notes that the film is unusual, and would appeal to "a particular taste".

=== Brazil theater premier ===
Kiki Black of the Jornal do Brasil expressed regret for having seen the film, stating that it could be summarized as a hundred-fold replication of the scene in Elite Squad where blood splatters on the screen. Black also stated that the fact R$1,000,000 had been spent "to see a woman emerging naked from a pig" was incomprehensible. Nelson Gobbi, also of the Jornal, however, gave the film 3/3 stars in a brief blurb, stating that the violence may be difficult for viewers to watch while also describing it as a masterclass in creating popular theater.

Mario Abbade of the Tribuna da Imprensa rated it 4/4 stars. Abbade was impressed with the technical aspects of the film, noting specifically that Eliezar's cinematography and Amarante's art direction created an impression of 1970s cinema and managed to transform modern-day São Paulo into a parallel fantasy world. Regarding the violence in the film, Abbade stated that every instance fit Coffin Joe's "psychology and obsession". To this end, Abbade praised Kapel's special effects, stating they enhanced the "terror and eroticism" of the film. Abbade also praised the use of tension-breaking humor employed throughout.

Globo 's Débora Miranda noted that the audience must shed some expectations if they intend to enjoy Embodiment of Evil. Miranda commented about the lack of modern special effects, but this adds to the experience as the viewer knows the terror on screen is real. Miranda stated that the script has plot holes and isn't always coherent, but this "humanizes" Coffin Joe. Miranda added that audiences shouldn't expect every actor to deliver an excellent performance yet noted there are several well-known Brazilian actors in the film who deliver.

Robledo Milani of Papo de Cinema gave the film an 8/10. Milani noted that the Coffin Joe character in the film is decidedly different from the one depicted to the majority of the Brazilian public through television, whom Milani described as "cartoonish". Milani admitted that the ilm has scenes which are difficult to watch but claimed that this had been intended, as it effectively brought Coffin Joe into the 21st century without "abandoning the charm that made him famous". Milani praised the technical aspects of the film, especially the special effects, and stated that it isn't something all audiences could enjoy, but dedicated fans would. The average rating from the site's critics was 7.1/10.

=== Other festivals and releases ===
After the screening at the Venice International Film Festival, Embodiment of Evil was reportedly well-received by the audience. Derek Elley from Variety disagreed, however, stating that it was a questionable entry even for a non-competition slot, and that the "[g]rungy-looking, distasteful gorefest" would only appeal to diehard fans of horror films. The technical aspects of the film also failed to impress Variety 's reviewer, who found the entire plot to simply be an excuse for "torture, mutilation and cannibalism scenes".

Dread Central 's Debi Moore gave the film a 5/5 justifying the rating by saying that the usual critique standards don't apply to Coffin Joe films. Moore praised the visuals, calling them "mind-blowing", but admitted that Coffin Joe's dialogue isn't always coherent. About the acting overall, Moore acknowledged that it is "uneven and over-the-top" while claiming that this is what givs the film its "charm".

Sakari Määttä of Elitisti rated the film 3.5 out of 5, commenting that it seemed more "politically correct" than the previous two films, with Coffin Joe showing opposition to corruption. Määttä also noted that the use of some elements in the film seem to be overdone in modern torture films, such as the use of hooks, insects, and arachnids. Määttä stated the film had too many characters and that scenes involving law enforcement as well as those with Father Eugênio created "boring" stretches. Elitisti 's overall weighted rating from six of their reviewers was a 3.0.

When the film released in London theaters in July 2009, critics were, overall, unimpressed. Robert Hanks of The Independent called it "peculiar" and lamented Mojica Marins in the lead as physically unthreatening due to his age. Nigel Andrews of the Financial Times afforded the film only one sentence, calling it "torture porn" that should be forgotten. Matt Glasby of Total Film called it "bonkers", saying it fluctuated between sadism and the ridiculous. Elliott Noble of Sky Entertainment gave it a 1/5, calling the script "pure gibberish" and stating the film "might be construed as an excuse for a dirty old filmmaker to indulge his misogynistic fantasies while getting his hands on as much nubile young flesh as possible".

Peter Bradshaw of The Guardian gave it a 3/5, calling it imaginative and noting "the surreal scenes of damnation have real chutzpah". Kevin Maher of The Times found it exploitative and unable to adequately convey the subtext it tried to portray at times, concluding his review by calling it "hateful misogyny". David Jenkins of Time Out called it in turns schlock, grotesque, rancid and sadistic, stating that a "hardened horror connoisseur" might enjoy it but it would leave most feeling unclean for having watched it. Like Nigel Andrews, Derek Malcolm of The Standard afforded it a single sentence, calling it "outré horror". (Note: The date on the online article is April 10, 2012, but Rotten Tomatoes records the review date as July 3, 2009.)

Following the 2009 Fantasia International Film Festival, Offscreen 's Randolph Jordan praised the pacing, lighting and photography, commending the filmmakers for their use of reconstructed scenes from the first two films in expressing Coffin Joe's inner torment. Jordan noted how this results in modern scenes "answering" the memories and stated that this technique enables viewers to clearly see the evolution of the character as well as demonstrating the monetary difference backing this film as compared to the earlier two.

Bill Gibron of PopMatters expressed satisfaction in seeing that Coffin Joe had not changed much ideoloically in the years since This Night I'll Possess Your Corpse. Gibron was impressed by the philosophical message in the film, though still called the brutality scenes "shocking", noting that Embodiment of Evil "relishes the repulsive nature of post-modern gore". Gibron rated it an 8/10.

=== DVD/Blu-ray release ===
Rue Morgue 's Dave Alexander found the technique of showing Coffin Joe's prior victims in black and white an effective method of tying the reconstructed scenes for flashbacks into the story. Alexander noted that Ramalho's impact on the story can be seen in the plethora of "surreal, blasphemous imagery". Regarding the film overall, Alexander called it "stylish" while also labeling it "mysoginistic" and "cruel".

Sean Axmaker of Parallax View noted that Embodiment of Evil didn't have the same energy or "crazed style" as Awakening of the Beast. Axmaker stated that Mojica Marins age worked against him as he no longer had the same magnetism of his youth, that he wasn't "a force of pure id in carny clothes". Axmaker said that the use of black and white to depict the phantoms haunting Coffin Joe was the "most creative idea" in the film and noted that it created deeper implications about the character's psyche. Axmaker was pleased with the clear picture on Blu-ray.

Reviewing the Blu-ray release, Adam Tyner of DVD Talk stated that despite being unfamiliar with the trilogy, Rumalho and Mojica Marins made it easy to follow the story. Tyner noted that it takes over 33 minutes before the audience is directly shown Coffin Joe's brutality, but that once that begins, the film continually attempts to outdo itself with a new "demented" horror. Tyner praised the classic elements of the film, contrasting the long shots used with the quick cuts utilized in more modern film editing as well as the practical effects used for the blood splatter rather than employing CGI. Tyner acknowledged that Coffin Joe seems to be "neutered" for a portion of the film so that character can change directions from earlier works. Noting that the film would be better appreciated by those familiar with the series, Tyner nonetheless recommended it, stating that viewers would have "an intense reaction" regardless of whether they personally enjoyed the film. With respect to the color used, Tyner noted that though the palette is "subdued" for the most part, it makes the color when it appears far more vibrant. Tyner enjoyed the 5.1 Dolby that provides a sense of atmosphere in viewing the film.

By contrast, InsidePulse 's Branden Chowen, also reviewing the Blu-ray, found the story incoherent and deplored the visual effects used in rendering the images of the previous victims who haunt Coffin Joe, stating that they were rendered with "mostly terrible CGI". Chowen also stated there was no acting worth accolades and noted that several sex scenes were difficult to sit through because of the age difference between Mojica Marins and the actresses involved. Chowen did praise Eliezer's cinematography, but ultimately stated that watching Rob Zombie would be a better use of time for fans of torture porn.

=== Later reviews ===
Marcelo Milici of the Portuguese horror critique site Boca do Inferno (site) rated the film 5/5, adding that it is "the best national production of the last 20 to 30 years." With praise for the cinematography, editing, special effects and the script, Milici expressed appreciation for the fact that Mojica Marins did not allow a larger budget and crew to compromise the tenor of his films, adding that this is the most sadistic in the trilogy.

Bloody Disgusting 's Luiz H.C. called Embodiment of Evil a "triumph", noting that Coffin Joe's bloodthirstiness comes across as secondary to the portrayal of the Brazilian police force as "authoritarian". Plume Noire 's Fred Thom also mentioned the more gruesome scenes and acknowledged that Embodiment of Evil is certainly no masterpiece. Thom added that the film is representative of "Brazilian cinema's subgenre" and recommended it overall.

== Awards ==
During the first Paulínia Film Festival, held July 5–12, 2008 in Paulínia, São Paulo, Brazil, Embodiment of Evil won 7 of 15 categories for fictional films. Mojica Marins was presented the Critics Choice award for best film. Other awards were best photography (José Roberto Eliezer), best film editing (Paulo Sacramento), best sound editing (Ricardo Reis), best soundtrack (André Abujamra and Márcio Nigro), best art direction (Cássio Amarante). At the Sitges Film Festival in October 2008, the film won Best Film for the Carnet Jove award.

Following the premiere of the film in Brazil, the final line, "Images don't die" (Portuguese: "Imagens não morrem"), was immortalized on the Roxy Cinema Walk of Fame next to Mojica Marins' newly minted star.

At the fifth annual FIESP/SESI-SP Paulista Cinema Awards March 2–18, 2009, Embodiment of Evil was nominated for Best Direction (José Mojica Marins), Best Script (Dennison Ramalho and José Mojica Marins), Best Actor (José Mojica Marins), Best Actress (Cléo de Páris), Best Supporting Actress (Helena Ignez), Best Supporting Actor (Jece Valadão), Best Art Direction (Cássio Amarante), and Best Soundtrack (André Abujamra and Márcio Nigro). It won for Best Actor and Best Art Direction.

At the March 2009 Brazilian Academy Film Awards, Cássio Amarante was nominated for Best Art Direction, with Kapel Furman nominated for Best Visual Effects, though neither was the ultimate winner in those categories. The film received four nominations at the 2009 Prêmio ABC de Cinematografia: José Roberto Eliezer for Best Cinematoraphy for a feature film; Cássio Amarante for Best Art Direction for a feature film; Louis Robin, Ricardo Reis, Miriam Biderman, and Armando Torres Jr for Best Sound for a feature film; and Paula Sacramento for Best Editing for a feature film, though other films ultimately won in those categories.

At the fourth annual Festival de Cinema de Países de Língua Portuguesa in May 2009, Cássio Amarante was awarded the prize for Best Art Direction.

Embodiment of Evil tied with Andreas Schaap's Must Love Death for the Silver Audience Award for Best International Film at the 2009 Fantasia International Film Festival. Mojica Marins was also presented with a Lifetime Achievement Award at Fantasia. At the 2009 Festival Sesc Melhores Filmes, Embodiment of Evil won the Best Film Audience Award, with Mojica Marins winning the Best Director Audience Award.

Year	Award	Event	Recipients	Result	Ref.
2008	Best Fiction Film	Paulínia Film Festival	Encarnação do Demônio	Won	
2008	Best Photography	Paulínia Film Festival	José Roberto Eliezer	Won	
2008	Best Film Editing	Paulínia Film Festival	Paulo Sacramento	Won	
2008	Best Sound Editing	Paulínia Film Festival	Ricardo Reis	Won	
2008	Best Soundtrack	Paulínia Film Festival	André Abujamra; Márcio Nigro	Won	
2008	Best Art Direction	Paulínia Film Festival	Cássio Amarante	Won	
2008	Critic's Choice Award	Paulínia Film Festival	José Mojica Marins	Received	
2008	Best Film, Carnet Jove	Sitges Film Festival	Encarnação do Demônio	Won	
2009	Best Direction	FIESP/SESI-SP Paulista Cinema Awards	José Mojica Marins	Nominated	
2009	Best Screenplay	FIESP/SESI-SP Paulista Cinema Awards	José Mojica Marins; Dennison Ramalho	Nominated	
2009	Best Actress	FIESP/SESI-SP Paulista Cinema Awards	Cléo de Páris	Nominated	
2009	Best Actor	FIESP/SESI-SP Paulista Cinema Awards	José Mojica Marins	Won	
2009	Best Supporting Actress	FIESP/SESI-SP Paulista Cinema Awards	Helena Ignez	Nominated	
2009	Best Supporting Actor	FIESP/SESI-SP Paulista Cinema Awards	Jece Valadão	Nominated	
2009	Best Art Direction	FIESP/SESI-SP Paulista Cinema Awards	Cássio Amarante	Won	
2009	Best Soundtrack	FIESP/SESI-SP Paulista Cinema Awards	André Abujamra; Márcio Nigro	Nominated	
2009	Best Art Direction	Brazilian Academy Film Awards	Cássio Amarante	Nominated	
2009	Best Visual Effects	Brazilian Academy Film Awards	Kapel Furman	Nominated	
2009	Best Art Direction	Festival de Cinema de Países de Língua Portuguesa	Cássio Amarante	Won	
2009	Lifetime Achievement Award	Fantasia International Film Festival	José Mojica Marins	Received	
2009	Best Film, Audience Award	Festival Sesc Melhores Filmes	Encarnação do Demônio	Won	
2009	Best Director, Audience Award	Festival Sesc Melhores Filmes	José Mojica Marins	Won	
2009	Best Cinematography, Feature Film	Prêmio ABC de Cinematografia	José Roberto Eliezer	Nominated	
2009	Best Art Direction, Feature Film	Prêmio ABC de Cinematografia	Cássio Amarante	Nominated	
2009	Best Sound, Feature Film	Prêmio ABC de Cinematografia	Louis Robin; Ricardo Reis; Miriam Biderman; Armando Torres Jr	Nominated	
2009	Best Editing, Feature Film	Prêmio ABC de Cinematografia	Paulo Sacramento	Nominated	
