= The End of Man =

1971 film directed by José Mojica Marins

- Theatrical release poster
- Directed by: José Mojica Marins
- Written by: Jose Mojica Marins; Rubens Francisco Luchetti
- Produced by: Marciano Bley Bittencourt
- Starring: José Mojica Marins
- Cinematography: Giorgio Attili
- Edited by: Roberto Leme
- Music by: Herminio Giménez
- Production company: Multifilmes
- Distributed by: Multifilmes
- Release date: 18 December 1971
- Running time: 79 minutes
- Country: Brazil
- Language: Portuguese

The End of Man (Latin: Finis Hominis) is a 1971 Brazilian film directed by José Mojica Marins. The unusual and surreal film was made on a low budget, and rather than the often disturbing gothic horror of his previous films, The End of Man conveys a sense of social black humor and tongue in cheek style seen in other Brazilian Mouth of Garbage Cinema (Boca do Lixo) of the late 1960s and early 1970s.

In the film, a mysterious man emerges from the ocean and wanders aimlessly through a town. After apparently resurrecting someone, the man is mistaken for a messiah with supernatural powers. After giving a farewell speech from a mountaintop, the would-be messiah voluntarily returns to his former residence, an insane asylum.

A sequel to the film was produced in 1972 titled When the Gods Fall Asleep (Quando os Deuses Adormecem).

== Plot ==
A mysterious man (Marins) emerges naked from the ocean and proceeds to affect the lives of townspeople, the country, then the world.

As he wanders through the town unclothed, he helps a woman in a wheelchair to walk by frightening her into running, then rescues a woman and her child from attackers when he startles them with his appearance.

He enters the well-decorated home of a woman with fashionable clothing. Seeing him, she goes to her wardrobe and chooses several pieces of her costumery which he puts on. The outfit includes an ornate turban, a sash, and a pointed baton. He walks through the streets of Santos dressed in this fashion, attracting increasingly more followers and admirers.

He shows no surprise at people's reaction to him; he regards it all with a deadpan acceptance.

When he later stops in a church and approaches the altar to fill the chalice with holy water and drinks it, he is observed by a priest who utters "Finis hominis". The strange man replies, "What"? The priest again states "Finis hominis, the end of man".

When the protagonist is later asked his name by the police after he assaults a photographer, he pauses, then replies: "Finis Hominis".

He saves the life of an adulteress and that of a young girl while gaining more followers all over the country as huge crowds follow him through the streets. He soon gains a messiah status after appearing to resurrect a dead man who actually was suffering a temporary nervous catalepsy. Nuns announce that Finis Hominis has come to save the world. Leaders of other countries warn of his dangerous "supernatural powers".

He announces that the time has come for him to leave and eventually gives a farewell speech from a mountaintop that is watched and listened to from all over the world.

In the final scene, two men in white uniforms see Finis Hominis approaching in the distance, and they seem pleased, saying, "Here he comes. I told you. He always returns." As the camera pulls back, it is revealed that the place Finis Hominis has returned to is an insane asylum.

== Cast ==
- José Mojica Marins as Finis Hominis
- Teresa Sodré as Madalena
- Roque Rodrigues as Cavalcanti
- Rosângela Maldonado as The schemer
- Mario Lima as The lover
- Andreia Bryanas as Soninha
