= Coffin Joe =

Brazilian fictional character

Zé do Caixão
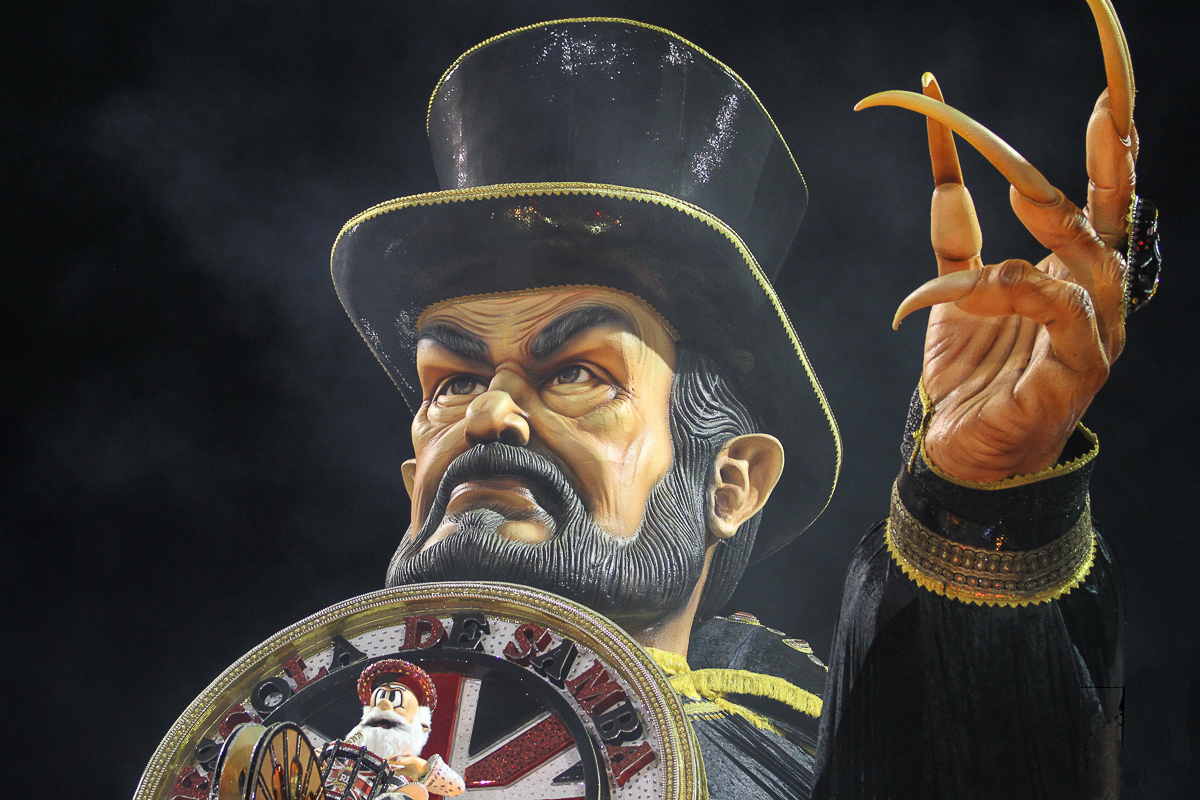
- Coffin Joe's float in the 2018 Carnival of São Paulo
- First appearance: At Midnight I'll Take Your Soul; 1964
- Last appearance: Embodiment of Evil; 2008
- Created by: José Mojica Marins
- Portrayed by: José Mojica Marins

In-universe information
- Alias: Josefel Zanatas
- Species: Human
- Gender: Male
- Occupation: Undertaker
- Home: Vila Velha (ES)
- Nationality: Brazilian

Zé do Caixão [ˈzɛ du kajˈʃɐ̃w], known in English-speaking countries as Coffin Joe, is a character created and mostly portrayed by Brazilian writer, director, and actor José Mojica Marins. An amoral undertaker with Nietzschian beliefs, he is driven by his desire to have a son by "the perfect woman", believing that immortality is achieved through procreation, a concept he refers to as "the continuation of blood". He often resorts to murder, kidnapping, and rape to achieve his means, with his violent nature, atheism, and antagonism towards Christianity placing him into conflict with his largely Catholic neighbors. Despite his own disbelief in the supernatural, he often finds himself experiencing paranormal phenomena, including encounters with ghosts, Death, and visions of Hell.

Initially conceived of by Marins to serve as the antagonist in At Midnight I'll Take Your Soul, Brazil's first horror film, Coffin Joe has gone on to appear in nine more films, three television series, songs, music videos, and comic books. The character has been called "Brazil's National Boogeyman", and is considered a horror icon and a cultural icon of Brazil, with his popularity resulting in descriptions of him as being the Brazilian equivalent of the United States' Freddy Krueger.

== Description ==
Coffin Joe is an undertaker by trade and runs his own funeral home, from which he also sells caskets, flowers, and wreaths. Unlike his neighbors, who dress largely in peasant or farming clothes, he wears a black top hat, black suit, and black cape; his most distinctive features are his thick beard and grotesquely long, curled fingernails. He is an amoral character who considers himself superior to others and exploits them to suit his purposes. He believes in reason and materialism, eschewing all religion and superstition, believing them to be impediments to human evolution; he looks down on anyone who does not hold his beliefs as inferior and exploitable, especially his Catholic neighbors. Conversely, he accepts others who share his beliefs as "superior", particularly women. The only individuals Joe considers to be pure are children, whom he believes have yet to be corrupted by the false moral codes of the adult world and towards whom he shows uncharacteristic displays of kindness.

While Joe himself disbelieves in the paranormal, he oftentimes finds himself experiencing supernatural phenomena, including encounters with ghosts (At Midnight I'll Take Your Soul), visions of Hell (This Night I'll Possess Your Corpse), and meeting otherworldly beings, including Death itself (Embodiment of Evil). The character rarely comments on these experiences, and they appear to have no lasting effect on his cosmology or personal beliefs.

Although none of the films in which he appears explore the character's backstory, Marins has outlined in interviews that Joe became jaded when he fought with the Brazilian Expeditionary Force in World War II, and developed his attitudes towards women when he returned home to learn that his beloved had begun an affair in his absence. The dual experiences both forged Joe's beliefs about mankind, as well as his desire to find the "perfect" woman.

== Background and conception ==
At the time of the first film's production, Brazil had produced no horror films of its own. Marins was a lifelong fan of horror films, having grown up watching them in the theater that his family owned, operated and lived above in an apartment.

Marins states that the idea for the character came in a dream:

"In a dream saw a figure dragging me to a cemetery. Soon he left me in front of a headstone, there were two dates of my birth and my death. People at home were very frightened, called a priest because they thought I was possessed. I woke up screaming, and at that time decided to do a movie unlike anything I had done. He was born at that moment the character would become a legend: Coffin Joe. The character began to take shape in my mind and in my life. The cemetery gave me the name, completed the costume of Joe the cover of voodoo and black hat, which was the symbol of a classic brand of cigarettes. He would be a mortician."

— José Mojica Marins, Portal Brasileiro de Cinema

Although rarely mentioned in the films, Coffin Joe's true name is Josefel Zanatas. Marins gives an explanation for the name in an interview for Portal Brasileiro de Cinema:

"I was thinking a name: Josefel: "fel" ("gall") for being bitter — and also Zanatas as a last name, because backward it reads "Satanás" ("Satan")".

— José Mojica Marins, Portal Brasileiro de Cinema

== Appearances ==
=== The Coffin Joe Trilogy ===
Coffin Joe first appears in At Midnight I'll Take Your Soul as the sole undertaker of a small, rural town somewhere in the vicinity of São Paulo. Although the rest of the townspeople hold him in contempt for his anti-Catholic sentiments and violent nature, they live in fear of him for his physical prowess and ability to best any man in a fight. The only people with whom Joe shares even a cordial relationship are his wife, Lenita, best friend Anthony, and Anthony's fiancée, Terezinha, whom Joe lusts for. Believing himself to be of intellectual superiority to those around him, Joe's primary drive is "the continuity of blood" in the form of a son born from "the perfect woman". After learning that Lenita cannot conceive, Joe kills her with a venomous tarantula, then murders Anthony by drowning him in a bathtub. Both deaths are ruled accidental and Joe makes advances on Terezinha, who turns him down. An enraged Joe rapes her, but Terezinha commits suicide rather than report him, though she promises vengeance from beyond the grave. On Dia de Finados, Joe witnesses a procession of ghosts who chase him to Anthony and Terezinha's tomb, where he witnesses their bodies coming to life. Later, the townspeople find Joe on the tomb steps, apparently dead, with his eyes bulging from their sockets.

Joe returns in This Night I'll Possess Your Corpse, in which it is revealed that he survived his encounter with Terezinha and Anthony's ghosts, though he was temporarily blinded. After recovering and going to trial, he is found not guilty for his crimes and returns to his mortuary business. Still desiring a son, he orders his henchman, Bruno, to begin kidnapping women from the town that he has dubbed superior, subjecting them to a series of tortures to see who endures. A woman named Marcia seems impervious to fear or pain, prompting Joe to declare her his "perfect woman", though she rebuffs him when he tries to make love to her while listening to the rest of the women being fatally bitten by venomous snakes. Joe permits her to leave alive, then sets his sights on Laura, the atheist daughter of a prominent colonel. Sharing Coffin Joe's beliefs, the pair become lovers, and Joe conspires to blame his crimes on the Colonel's protege. Although Laura becomes pregnant, both she and their son die in childbirth. Meanwhile, Marcia, wracked with guilt, confesses her experiences, and a lynch mob forms to pursue Joe. They chase him to a swamp, where he is shot. As Joe sinks into the water, a priest offers him salvation, and Joe agrees to die as a Christian before apparently drowning.

Joe returns again in Embodiment of Evil, with a flashback revealing that Joe only momentarily faked his death, surfacing seconds later to deny God and mock the priest before blinding him with his fingernails. Captured and tried for murder, Joe is sentenced to 40 years in prison before being released onto the streets of 2008 São Paulo. Reuniting with Bruno, Joe discovers that a cult has formed around his teachings and beliefs. Joe begins dispatching his followers to bring him women, whom he subjects to mental and physical torture; several women voluntarily fall under his sway, including a eugenicist. Throughout the ordeal, Joe is haunted by visions of his past victims, as well as disturbing hallucinations foretelling his own death. Meanwhile, Joe is pursued by a fervently Catholic police captain and a mentally unhinged priest named Father Eugenio, the son of one of his victims. The pair ultimately pursue Joe to an abandoned amusement park, where he succeeds in killing the captain before himself being stabbed to death with a crucifix by Father Eugenio. In an epilogue, Joe's followers congregate at his graveside, where it is revealed that several of the women are pregnant.

=== Appearance in other films ===
Joe appears as the host of the 1968 anthology film The Strange World of Coffin Joe, introducing the film's segments.

Joe appears as a fictional character in the 1970 film Awakening of the Beast, in which test subjects dosed with LSD have hallucinations of him after viewing a movie poster for The Strange World of Coffin Joe.

The Bloody Exorcism of Coffin Joe is a metafilm about José Mojica Marins being haunted by the character, who has come to life as an avatar of Satan.

The Strange Hostel of Naked Pleasures features a character strongly implied to be Coffin Joe, here operating as the proprietor of an ambiguously haunted hostel.

He again returns as a fictional character in Hallucinations of a Deranged Mind, in which a scientist seeks out the help of Marins after being haunted by dreams in which Coffin Joe abducts his wife. The film is partially composed of deleted scenes from previous Coffin Joe movies.

=== As a horror host ===
Marins has often appeared in character as Coffin Joe in the role of a horror host.

From 1967 to 1988, Marins hosted the program Além, Muito Além do Além (Beyond, Much Beyond the Beyond) Fridays on TV Bandeirantes, in character as Coffin Joe, presenting short horror tales written by author and screenwriter Rubens Luchetti. Some scripts were later adapted as Coffin Joe comic books. The show's tapes were reused and currently there are no known intact recordings of this program.

Marins directed and hosted The Show from the Other World (Um Show do Outro Mundo) on Rede Record de Televisão, again appearing as Coffin Joe. The half-hour program featured short horror films, with many of the stories sent in by the viewers themselves and adapted by members of Marins' production team. As with his earlier show, the original tapes were reused and there is no known record of this material.

In 1996 Marins hosted the daily television program Cine Trash on TV Bandeirantes, which featured full-length horror films.

=== Portrayals by other actors ===
Across all his appearances, Coffin Joe has been portrayed by Marins with the exception of the flashback sequences in Embodiment of Evil, in which he was played by actor, writer, and director Raymond Castille. Castille came to Marins' attention for his comedic short film The Blind Date of Coffin Joe, a parody of the first two films in the trilogy in which Joe—played by Castille and living in modern-day United States—attempts to find the perfect woman through internet dating.

In October 2021, two studios announced intentions of launching new versions of Coffin Joe. Lex Ortega and Adrián García Bogliano were reported to be in the process of writing a script for a feature-length film that would provide a Mexican history for the character which was to be produced through One Eyed Films. One Eyed also signed an option allowing SpectreVision to create an English-Language version.
