= Awakening of the Beast =

1970 film directed by José Mojica Marins

- Brazilian theatrical poster
- Directed by: José Mojica Marins
- Written by: Rubens F. Lucchetti
- Produced by: Giorgio Attili; José Mojica Marins; George Michel Serkeis
- Starring: José Mojica Marins; Mário Lima
- Cinematography: Giorgio Attili
- Edited by: Luiz Elias
- Production companies: Fotocena Filmes; M.M. Multifilmes; OVNI
- Release date: October 1970 (Brazil)
- Running time: 93 minutes
- Country: Brazil
- Language: Portuguese

Awakening of the Beast (Portuguese: O Despertar da Besta, also released as Portuguese: O Ritual dos Sádicos) is a 1970 Brazilian horror/exploitation film directed by José Mojica Marins. Marins is also known by his alter ego Coffin Joe (Zé do Caixão). Marins appears as himself and as the Coffin Joe character in the fictional film which is in the form of a pseudodocumentary.

== Plot ==
In the film's first portion, filmed in black and white, Dr. Sergio, a psychiatrist, appears on a television program on a panel with three other contemporary psychiatrists after he claims to have conducted experiments on four volunteer drug addicts with LSD in order to investigate his claim that sexual perversion is caused by use of illegal drugs. As evidence, he presents a series of documented accounts of drug use which led to lewd and bizarre sexual acts. Marins appears (as himself) on the panel with the psychiatrists as some type of expert on the subject of depravity. During the program, Dr. Sergio recounts the experiment to his colleagues on the panel, who reject his claims.

Dr. Sergio gathers the four volunteers, and after receiving an injection, the volunteers (four drug users seen in the previous segments) are instructed to stare at a movie poster of Marins' The Strange World of Coffin Joe. The film changes to color and each patient's experience is vividly portrayed in a series of surreal scenes.

The film switches back to black and white, and Dr. Sergio reveals that he did not in fact give the patients LSD, but rather a placebo, and their experiences were caused purely by their reactions to the Coffin Joe movie poster.

== Cast ==
- Andréa Bryan
- Annik Malvil
- Graveto
- Ítala Nandi
- José Mojica Marins as Coffin Joe
- Lurdes Vanucchi Ribas
- Mário Lima as Volunteer
- Ozualdo Candeias as Volunteer
- Roney Wanderney

=== The television panel ===
- Carlos Reichenbach
- Jairo Ferreira
- João Callegaro
- José Mojica Marins as himself
- Maurice Capovilla
- Sérgio Hingst as Dr Sérgio
- Walter C. Portella

== Release ==
=== Home media ===
The film was released on DVD by Fantoma on April 3, 2001. Fantoma would re-release the film on October 8, following year as a part of its 3-disk, Limited Edition Boxed Set of The Coffin Joe Trilogy. On September 2, that same year it was released by Boum Productions. On July 29, 2003 it was released by Ryko Distribution and re-released by Fantoma.

== Reception ==
Jason Buchanan from Allmovie called the film 'a slight improvement in quality in comparison to the director's previous efforts', also stating that the "color trip out" scenes "remarkably vivid and effective". Although Buchanan stated that the film "leaves much to be desired". Ryan McDonald from HorrorAsylum.com rated the film 2/5 stars, writing, "The title is certainly pretty clever, but overall, this isn’t especially well-done and seems to be a private joke by Marins himself. I’m not sure if it’s anything more than a curio at best." On his website Ozus' World Movie Reviews, Dennis Schwartz gave the film a grade of C−. In his review, Schwartz called the film "amateurish" and "crudely made". Schwartz concluded his review by writing, "How much of this crapola you can take, depends on your intestinal fortitude and how much you appreciate the "auteur's" hidden subversions about society. My tolerance point for such schlock art is very low and I found myself turned off very early on and nothing that transpired later on brought me back into the Marins' fold."

== See also ==
- List of films featuring hallucinogens
