= At Midnight I'll Take Your Soul =

1964 film directed by José Mojica Marins

- Theatrical release poster
- Portuguese: À Meia-Noite Levarei Sua Alma
- Directed by: José Mojica Marins
- Written by: Waldomiro França; José Mojica Marins; Magda Mei
- Produced by: Arildo Iruam; Geraldo Martins Simões; Ilídio Martins Simões
- Starring: José Mojica Marins
- Cinematography: Giorgio Attili
- Edited by: Luiz Elias
- Music by: Salatiel Coelho; Hermínio Gimenez
- Production company: Indústria Cinematográfica Apolo
- Distributed by: N.T.M.
- Release date: 9 November 1964
- Running time: 84 minutes
- Country: Brazil
- Language: Portuguese

At Midnight I'll Take Your Soul (Portuguese: À Meia-Noite Levarei Sua Alma) is a 1964 Brazilian horror film directed and co-written by José Mojica Marins. Marins stars as Zé do Caixão (known in English-speaking countries as Coffin Joe), an undertaker who believes that he can achieve immortality by having a son, a concept he refers to as "the continuation of blood". The film marks the first appearance of the Coffin Joe character in media.

At Midnight I'll Take Your Soul is the first Brazilian-produced horror film, and the first installment of the "Coffin Joe trilogy". It is followed by This Night I'll Possess Your Corpse (1967) and Embodiment of Evil (2008).

== Plot ==
The film is set in an unnamed Brazilian small town. Zé do Caixão, the local undertaker who disdains religion and emotion and who believes the only thing that matters is the "continuity of the blood" (specifically his own), is looking for the "perfect woman" to bear him a son, ensuring his immortality. Since his wife Lenita has been found to be unable to bear children, Zé begins to make advances with Terezinha, the fiancée of Zé's friend Antonio. Terezinha scolds him by telling him that Antonio is the only man in her life. During a Catholic holiday, Zé, discontent with her infertility, kills his wife Lenita by tying her up and having a venomous spider bite her. The local authorities cannot find a clue to arrest him and he remains free to do whatever he wants.

Some days later, Zé is invited by Antonio to visit a local gypsy who will tell the fortune of Antonio's marriage with Terezinha. The gypsy reveals, however, that there is going to be a tragic disaster, and the two will never get married. Zé, in response, calls her a fraud and states that the supernatural is a hoax. She warns him not to mock the supernatural forces, lest they make him pay. That night, Zé and Antonio go to Antonio's house, where Antonio tells Zé that he really did not believe the witch's words, and that he expects to marry Terezinha and have a happy life together. Fulfilling the witch's prophecy, Zé bludgeons and then strangles and drowns Antonio in a bathtub.

Once again, the police can find no evidence to directly implicate Zé in the crime. He proceeds with his plan to seduce Terezinha by purchasing a canary for her, which she accepts. Suddenly he starts to touch her against her will. Terezinha tries to resist, and Zé savagely beats her into a helpless state and rapes her. Finally able to speak, Terezinha curses him for his brutality, saying she will kill herself, then return to take his soul to hell. Zé laughs at her, but the next day she is found hanging in her home. To his surprise, she does not blame him in her suicide note. Meanwhile, the village doctor, Rodolfo, begins to suspect Zé's involvement in the recent violent deaths. When Zé becomes aware of the doctor's suspicions, Zé appears at Dr. Rodolfo's home, gouges his eyes with his long fingernails and sets him on fire.

Time passes, and Zé remains unpunished for his crimes. On the Day of the Dead he meets Marta, a young woman who is visiting her relatives, and decides to choose her as his perfect woman. Zé escorts Marta home late at night, only to be confronted by the gypsy who predicted the doom of Antonio and Terezinha. She tells Zé that his soul shall be claimed by the ghosts of those he murdered and by Satan at midnight. Zé threatens the gypsy, but after leaving Marta at her destination, he is visited by ghostly apparitions. Zé runs away, and arrives at the mausoleum where Antonio and Terezinha are buried. At the edge of his sanity, Zé opens the coffins to prove to himself his victims are really dead, but instead sees that their eyes are open, and their faces crawling with spiders and maggots. Sometime later, the villagers arrive at the mausoleum after hearing Zé's screams and find him lying on his back, horribly disfigured, his eyes bulging open. At that same time, the bells of the local church ring, announcing the stroke of midnight.

== Cast ==
- José Mojica Marins as Zé do Caixão
- Laércio Laurelli as Zé do Caixão (voice, uncredited)
- Magda Mei as (Terezinha)
- Nivaldo Lima as Antônio
- Valéria Vasquez as Lenita
- Ilídio Martins Simões as Dr. Rodolfo
- Eucaris Moraes as the old witch (gypsy)

== Production ==
Marins was inspired to make the film based on a nightmare where he was lowered into a grave by a black-clad version of himself. To fund the project, Marins sold possessions such as his family car, having his wife live with her parents. He charged money to his acting students in exchange for participation in the film and paid only a few members of production. To recoup costs, Marins sold the rights to the film to Ilídio Martins Simões (who also plays Dr. Rodolfo) before its premiere.

== Reception ==
On the review aggregator website Rotten Tomatoes, the film has an approval rating of 67% based on six reviews, with an average rating of 6.25/10.

Critics such as Salvyano Cavalcanti de Paiva believed the film to a response to Brazil's then-current military dictatorship, with Zé do Caixão standing in for the government's cruelty. However, shooting for the film had concluded 5 months prior to the military coup, making it unlikely Marins based the film on this specifically.
