= This Night I'll Possess Your Corpse =

1967 film directed by José Mojica Marins

- Original film poster
- Directed by: José Mojica Marins
- Written by: Aldenora De Sa Porto; José Mojica Marins
- Produced by: José Mojica Marins; Augusto Pereira
- Starring: José Mojica Marins
- Cinematography: Giorgio Attili
- Edited by: Luiz Elias
- Music by: Herminio Giménez
- Production company: Cinematográfica Ibéria
- Distributed by: Paranaguá Cinematográfica
- Release date: 13 March 1967
- Running time: 108 minutes
- Country: Brazil
- Language: Portuguese

This Night I'll Possess Your Corpse (Portuguese: Esta Noite Encarnarei no Teu Cadáver) is a 1967 Brazilian horror film directed by José Mojica Marins. Marins is also known by his alter ego Coffin Joe (Zé do Caixão). It is the second installment of Marins' "Coffin Joe trilogy", being preceded by At Midnight I'll Take Your Soul (1963), and followed by Embodiment of Evil (2008).

== Plot ==
Coffin Joe returns to his village after recovering in a hospital from shock and blindness from the events in the previous film. Having been absolved of his previous crimes and murders, this time he is even more determined to find the "perfect" woman with whom to sire a son of superior lineage, for his singular, obsessive desire for the "continuity of blood". Assisted by his gaunt, hunchbacked, facially disfigured servant Bruno, he kidnaps six beautiful women the first night he returns to town. He puts them through a series of sadistic trials to determine if one of them exhibits no fear, indicating superiority to bear his son. When the woman named Marcia remains proudly unaffected while the others scream and beg to the terrors they are submitted into, Coffin Joe retains her as his chosen and imprisons the other five in a pit below his bedroom, where he releases venomous snakes to kill them. Too shocked with what Coffin Joe had done, however, Marcia refuses to make love with him, and Coffin Joe lets her go. He claims to know that she won't report him to the authorities.

After this incident, the village receives the visit of the local colonel's daughter Laura, who soon catches the attention of Coffin Joe. Coffin Joe invites Laura to meet with him at midnight, and she quickly falls in love with him. The colonel and his other son try to stop Laura from meeting with Coffin Joe, but it is in vain. Determined to be rid of Coffin Joe, Laura's brother tries to bribe Coffin Joe by offering a large amount of money if he drops Laura and leaves the village. However, Coffin Joe and Bruno capture him and brutally kill him. They later frame the colonel's thug Truncador for the murder.

Later, to his shock and horror, Coffin Joe learns that one of the women that he kidnapped and killed using the snakes was pregnant. Feeling guilty for have killed an unborn child, he eventually has a horrible nightmare where is he dragged to a graveyard and pulled into Hell. There he witnesses its inhabitants being endlessly tortured and persecuted. He sees the Devil, and Coffin Joe is shocked when he sees that the Devil appears to be himself. After the nightmare is over, he remarks his beliefs strongly, claiming what he is doing is not wrong.

Meanwhile, Truncador escapes from the jail and meets with the colonel, who wishes to kill Coffin Joe for seducing his daughter. He sends Truncador to find other hit men, and that same night they attack Coffin Joe, but Coffin Joe manages to kill them all. At the same time, Marcia can't free her mind of the kidnapping victims’ deaths and drinks arsenic. Before she succumbs to death, she reveals to the doctor and to the present people about Joe's crimes. The villagers, under the command of the colonel, prepare a lynch mob and go after Coffin Joe.

Meanwhile, Laura is ready to give birth to a baby, but the doctor tells Coffin Joe that her situation is too critical, and only one (Laura or the baby) will survive. Coffin Joe and Laura agree the baby is the one who must live, but the operation ends unsuccessfully with both Laura and the baby dying. Devastated, Coffin Joe takes Laura's body to a mausoleum in the cemetery, where he is finally surrounded by the villagers. Coffin Joe tries to escape but is shot and ends up falling in the pond in which he dumped his previous victims. In the movie's final scene, the local priest approaches Coffin Joe and begs him to accept God so his soul will be saved, and Joe concedes, accepting God as his savior. He drowns in the pond and sinks as skeletons rise to the surface.

== Cast ==
- Antonio Fracari as Truncador
- Nadia Freitas as Marcia
- Nivaldo Lima as Bruno
- José Mojica Marins as Zé do Caixão
- Roque Rodrigues as The Coronel
- Tina Wohlers as Laura

== Production ==
Brazilian censors forced director and star José Mojica Marins to recut the ending of This Night I'll Possess Your Corpse so that Coffin Joe comes to believe in the existence and authority of God, and repents. Marins was opposed to the demand, which he went on to feel had placed a "curse" on him and his career.

== Reception ==
Dennis Schwartz of Ozus' World Movie Reviews gave the film a grade of "C−", calling it a "Tedious and overly preachy supernatural horror film." Dave Sindelar from Fantastic Movie Musings and Ramblings wrote, "The movie itself has a real sense of surreal and jarring horror, but its main problem may be its lack of subtlety; the themes come across as blatantly obvious and a little too self-consciously articulated. Furthermore, since Coffin Joe's philosophy isn't really that complex, you can really only listen to his talk for so long before it starts to get tiresome."
