= José Mojica Marins =

Brazilian filmmaker (1936–2020)

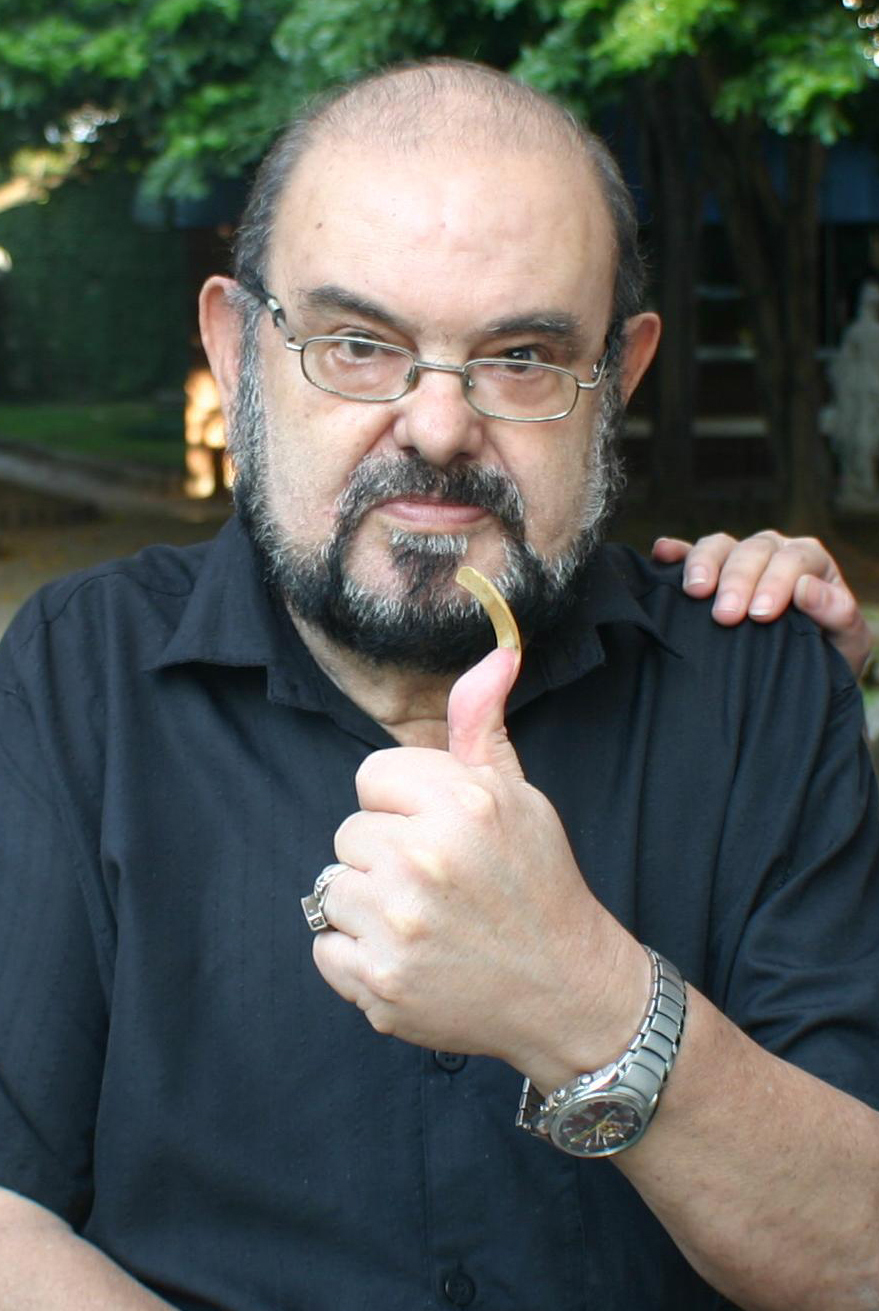
- Marins c. 2009
- Born: 13 March 1936; São Paulo, Brazil
- Died: 19 February 2020 (aged 83); São Paulo, Brazil
- Other names: Zé do Caixão; Coffin Joe; Mojica; J. Avelar
- Occupation(s): Filmmaker; Film actor Television actor Media personality Horror host

José Mojica Marins (13 March 1936 – 19 February 2020) was a Brazilian filmmaker, actor, composer, screenwriter, and television horror host. Marins is also known for creating and playing the character Coffin Joe (loosely translated from Zé do Caixão) in a series of horror films; the character has since gone on to become his alter ego as well as a pop culture icon, a horror icon, and a cult figure. The popularity of Coffin Joe in Brazil has led to the character being referred to as "Brazil's National Boogeyman" and "Brazil's Freddy Krueger".

Born in São Paulo, Marins made his feature film directorial debut in the 1950s with the film Adventurer's Fate. He went on to direct the 1964 film At Midnight I'll Take Your Soul, which is considered Brazil's first horror film. At Midnight I'll Take Your Soul marks the first appearance of the Coffin Joe character, a role that Marins would reprise in This Night I'll Possess Your Corpse (1967) and Embodiment of Evil (2008), along with a number of other films and television series. He is considered to have been a pioneer of Brazilian horror cinema and of graphically violent horror films in general.

== Early life ==
Marins was born on Friday, 13 March 1936 in São Paulo, Brazil at a farm in the Vila Mariana, to Antonio André Marins and Carmen Mogica Imperial, both descended from Spanish immigrants. His interest in filmmaking began at an early age. When Marins was three, his father ran a local cinema, and the family lived in a flat above it. During his childhood, Marins made short films with a camera that his parents had given to him as a present. These shorts starred himself and his neighbours, and were exhibited at churches and amusement parks.

In 1953, at the age of 18, Marins founded Cia. Cinematográfica Atlas (the Atlas Film Company). He acquired an abandoned synagogue which he transformed into a film studio and academy, where he gave acting lessons and trained technicians in order to finance his films.

== Career ==
=== Coffin Joe ===
Marins is best known for creating and portraying Coffin Joe, a character who is considered a horror icon, a Brazilian cultural icon, and a cult figure. An amoral undertaker with Nietzschian philosophies and a hatred for organized religion, the character appeared as the primary character in a trilogy (known as the "Coffin Joe Trilogy") revolving around his homicidal quest to find "the perfect woman" so he can achieve metaphorical immortality by having a son. Following the success of the first film in the series, Marins reprised his role as the character in This Night I'll Possess Your Corpse (1967) and Embodiment of Evil (2008), along with a number of other films and television series. The character has also appeared in comic books and music videos. The popularity of Coffin Joe has resulted in the character being referred to as the Brazilian equivalent of Freddy Krueger.

=== Other film work ===
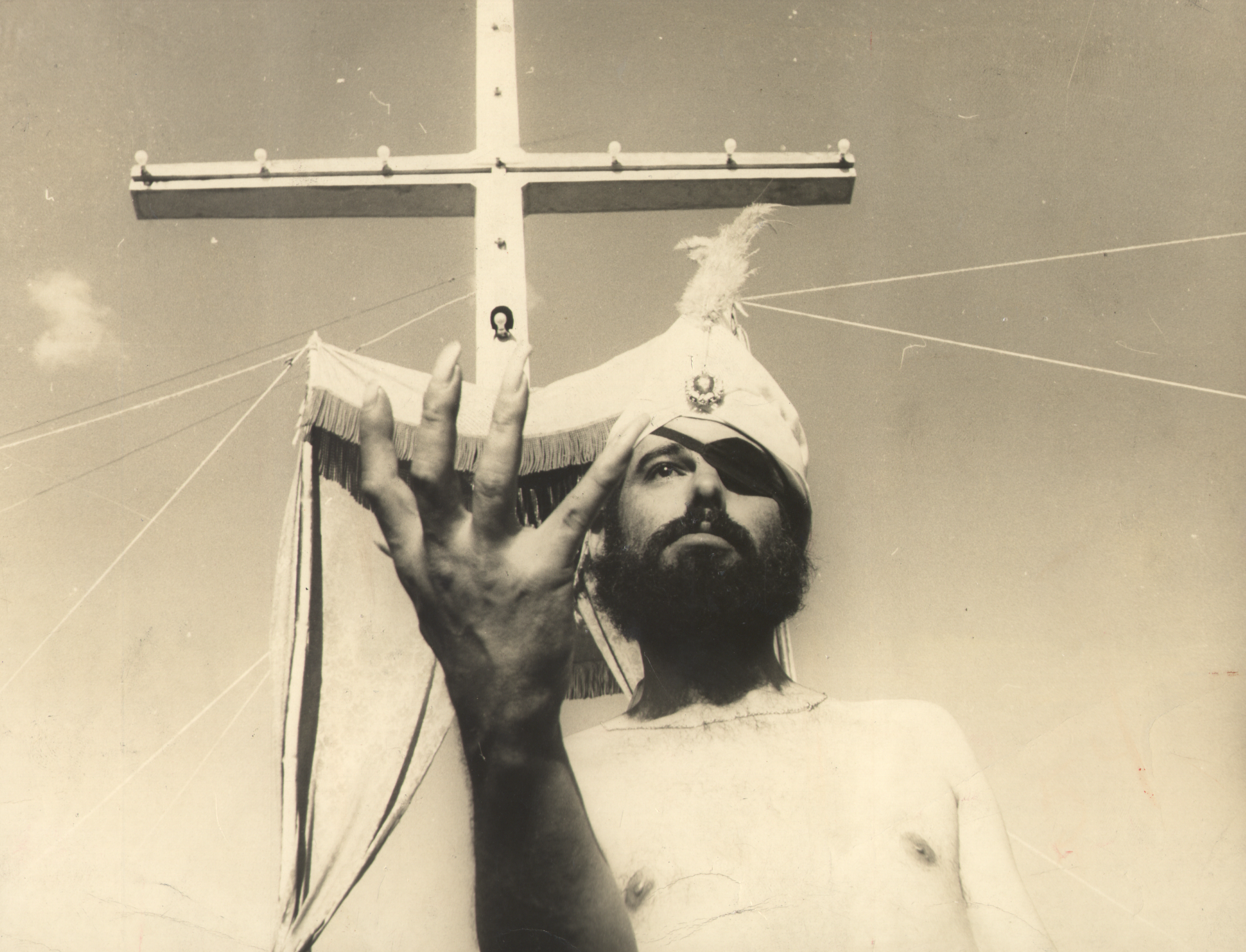
José Mojica Marins in O Profeta da Fome (1971).

Although most known for films in the horror genre, Marins also created exploitation, drugsploitation, sexploitation (often in the form of pseudo-documentaries), and Westerns. Marins is noted for his low-budget film style, often using friends and amateur actors as cast and crew. His films are usually set in São Paulo, Brazil.

Marins became interested in cinema at a young age. He recounted that he made his first film, O Juízo Final (Judgement Day), shot in 8 mm, in 1948 at the age of 12. He followed with Encruzilhada da Perdição (Crossroads to Perdition, 1952). Mojica was one of several directors of the 2013 anthology horror film The Profane Exhibit, directing the segment "Viral". In 2014 he again collaborated with other directors on the anthology film The Black Fables.

=== Television work ===
Marins hosted a monthly interview program The Strange World of Coffin Joe on the Brazilian television station Canal Brasil, in which he discussed Brazilian media and culture with other contemporary figures, such as actors and musicians. His guests included Zé Ramalho, Rogério Skylab, and Supla.

From 1967 to 1988, Marins hosted the program Além, Muito Além do Além (Beyond, Far Beyond the Beyond) on TV Bandeirantes, in character as Coffin Joe, presenting short horror tales written by author and screenwriter Rubens Luchetti. Some scripts were later adapted as Coffin Joe comic books. The show's tapes were reused and currently there are no known intact recordings of this program.

Marins directed and hosted The Show from the Other World (Um Show do Outro Mundo) on Rede Record de Televisão, again appearing as Coffin Joe. The half-hour program featured short horror films, with many of the stories sent in by the viewers themselves and adapted by members of Marins' production team. As with his earlier show, the original tapes were reused and there is no known record of this material.

In 1996 Marins hosted the daily television program Cine Trash on TV Bandeirantes, which featured full-length horror films.

=== Documentaries ===
Marins appears in The Universe of Mojica Marins (O Universo de Jose Mojica Marins, 1978), a 26-minute documentary film directed by Ivan Cardoso. Marins portrays himself in the film, which also features interviews with Marins' mother Carmen Marins, film editor Nilcemar Leyart, and Satã (Marins' assistant and bodyguard). In 1987 Marins released the semi-autobiographical documentary film Demons and Wonders (Demônios e Maravilhas), in which he appears as himself re-enacting moments from his life, with his family and associates playing themselves as well.

A 2001 documentary film, Damned – The Strange World of José Mojica Marins (Maldito - O Estranho Mundo de José Mojica Marins), directed by biographers André Barcinski and Ivan Finotti, examines Marins's life and works. It won the Special Jury Prize at the 2001 Sundance Film Festival.

== Death ==
Marins died of complications caused by bronchopneumonia on 19 February 2020, aged 83, in São Paulo. Prior to his death, Marins had been hospitalized for about 20 days.

== Selected filmography ==
- Adventurer's Fate (1958)
- My Destiny In Your Hands (1963)
- At Midnight I'll Take Your Soul (1964)
- This Night I'll Possess Your Corpse (1967)
- The Strange World of Coffin Joe (1968)
- Awakening of the Beast (1970)
- The End of Man (1970)
- The Bloody Exorcism of Coffin Joe (1974)
- The Strange Hostel of Naked Pleasures (1976)
- Hellish Flesh (1977)
- Hallucinations of a Deranged Mind (1978)
- Perversion (1979)
- Embodiment of Evil (2008)
- The Profane Exhibit (segment: "Viral", 2013)
