= List of Brazilian films of the 1960s =

An incomplete list of films produced in Brazil in the 1960s. For an A-Z list of films currently on Wikipedia see Category:Brazilian films

Title	Director	Cast	Genre	Notes
1960
Arraial do Cabo	Mário Carneiro, Paulo Cesar Saraceni		Documentary	
Aruanda				
As Aventuras de Pedro Malazartes				
Aí Vem a Alegria				
Cidade Ameaçada	Roberto Farias	Jardel Filho, Eva Wilma, Reginaldo Faria	Crime	Entered into the 1960 Cannes Film Festival
Dona Violante Miranda				
Macumba Love				Brazilian-U.S. co-production
Zé do Periquito				
1961
Amor na Selva				
America di notte				
The First Mass	Lima Barreto	Roberto Alrean, Dionísio Azevedo	Drama	Entered into the 1961 Cannes Film Festival
A Morte Comanda o Cangaço	Carlos Coimbra	Alberto Ruschel, Aurora Ribeiro, Milton Ribeiro	Action	Entered into the 11th Berlin International Film Festival
Por Um Céu de Liberdade				
Tristeza do Jeca				
1962
O Pagador de Promessas	Anselmo Duarte	Leonardo Villar, Glória Menezes, Dionísio Azevedo, Geraldo Del Rey, Norma Bengell	Drama	
Al ladro				
Os Apavorados				
Assassinato em Copacabana				
O Assalto ao Trem Pagador				
The Unscrupulous Ones	Ruy Guerra	Jece Valadão, Norma Bengell, Daniel Filho	Crime	Entered into the 12th Berlin International Film Festival
Garrincha: Hero of the Jungle	Joaquim Pedro de Andrade	Garrincha	Documentary	Entered into the 13th Berlin International Film Festival
O Vendedor de Lingüiças				
Vagabundos no Society				
The Beggars	Flávio Migliaccio	Vanja Orico	Drama	Entered into the 3rd Moscow International Film Festival
1963
Américas Unidas				
Apelo				
My Destiny In Your Hands	José Mojica Marins	José Mojica Marins, Mário Lima	Western	
Sonhando com Milhões				
Vidas Secas	Nelson Pereira dos Santos	Átila Iório, Maria Ribeiro	Drama	Entered into the 1964 Cannes Film Festival
1964
Asfalto Selvagem				
At Midnight I'll Take Your Soul	José Mojica Marins	José Mojica Marins	Horror	
Black God, White Devil	Glauber Rocha	Geraldo Del Rey, Yoná Magalhães, Othon Bastos		Entered into the 1964 Cannes Film Festival
The Guns	Ruy Guerra	Átila Iório, Nelson Xavier, Maria Gladys	Drama	Entered into the 14th Berlin International Film Festival
Men and Women	Walter Hugo Khouri	Norma Bengell, Odete Lara, Mário Benvenutti, Gabriele Tinti		Entered into the 1965 Cannes Film Festival
As Moradas				
The Obsessed of Catule	Anselmo Duarte	Raul Cortez, José Parisi, Esther Mellinger, Lélia Abramo, Maria Cardoso	Drama	Entered into the 15th Berlin International Film Festival
1965
Os Abas Largas				
Amazonas, Amazonas				
The Hour and Turn of Augusto Matraga	Roberto Santos	Leonardo Villar, Joffre Soares, Maria Ribeiro, Maurício do Valle	Crime drama	Entered into the 1966 Cannes Film Festival
The Priest and the Girl	Joaquim Pedro de Andrade	Helena Ignez, Paulo José	Drama	Entered into the 16th Berlin International Film Festival
São Paulo, Sociedade Anônima	Luis Sérgio Person	Walmor Chagas, Darlene Glória	Drama	Brazilian submission for the Best Foreign Language Film at the 38th Academy Awards
1966
Amor e Desamor				
Arrastão				
O Diabo de Vila Velha				
1967
The ABC of Love	Eduardo Coutinho		Drama	Entered into the 17th Berlin International Film Festival
O Anjo Assassino				
Case of the Naves Brothers	Luis Sérgio Person	Raul Cortez, Juca de Oliveira		Entered into the 5th Moscow International Film Festival
Coração de Luto				
Entranced Earth	Glauber Rocha	Jardel Filho, Paulo Autran, José Lewgoy, Glauber Rocha, Paulo Gracindo	Drama	Entered into the 1967 Cannes Film Festival
This Night I'll Possess Your Corpse	José Mojica Marins	José Mojica Marins	Horror	
1968
The Amorous Ones	Walter Hugo Khouri	Paulo José, Jacqueline Myrna, Lilian Lemmertz, Anecy Rocha	Drama	
Antes, o Verão				
Anuska, Manequim e Mulher				
Até Que o Casamento Nos Separe				
As Aventuras de Chico Valente				
The Red Light Bandit	Rogério Sganzerla	Paulo Villaça, Helena Ignez, Luiz Linhares, Pagano Sobrinho	Crime film	
Bebel, Garota Propaganda				
The Brave Warrior	Gustavo Dahl	Paulo César Pereio, Mário Lago, Ítalo Rossi, Maria Lúcia Dahl, Milton Gonçalves	Drama	
Hunger for Love	Nelson Pereira dos Santos			Entered into the 18th Berlin International Film Festival
The Strange World of Coffin Joe	José Mojica Marins	José Mojica Marins	Horror	
Trilogy of Terror	José Mojica Marins, Luis Sérgio Person, Ozualdo Candeias		Horror	
1969
Adultério à Brasileira				
O Agente da Lei				
Agnaldo, Perigo à Vista				
América do Sexo				
Antonio das Mortes	Glauber Rocha	Maurício do Valle, Odete Lara, Othon Bastos, Hugo Carvana	Western	Best Director at the 1969 Cannes Film Festival
O Anjo Nasceu				
As Armas				
Brazil Year 2000	Walter Lima, Jr.	Anecy Rocha, Ênio Gonçalves		Won a Silver Bear at Berlin
Macunaíma	Joaquim Pedro de Andrade	Paulo José, Grande Otelo, Dina Sfat	Comedy	
A Mulher de Todos				
A Penúltima Donzela				
