= Rita Cléos =

Brazilian actress

Rita Cleós
- Born: September 29, 1931; Blumenau
- Died: April 25, 1988 (aged 56); Rio de Janeiro
- Other names: Rita Schadrack
- Occupation: Actress
- Known for: First actress in a bathing scene on Brazilian television

Rita Cleós (née Rita Schadrack; sometimes credited as Rita Cleoci; Blumenau, September 29, 1931 – Curitiba, April 25, 1988) was a Brazilian film, stage, and voice actress. She appeared in films such as Esquina da Ilusão (1953), É Proibido Beijar (1954), Macumba na Alta (1958) and A Noite das Depravadas (1981). She was the first actress to make a bathing scene on Brazilian television.

== Life and career ==
Rita Cléos was the daughter of Ernesto (1900–1966) and Elsa Schadrack (1905–1977). In 1935, she emigrated with her family to Germany, where she spent her childhood. In 1946, she returned to her hometown.

Rita began her artistic career making films, having worked between 1953 and 1958 in the productions Esquina da Ilusão, A Família Lero-Lero, É Proibido Beijar and Macumba da Alta. In 1962, Rita began working for TV Tupi and, from 1962 to 1969, appeared in a series of telenovelas such as A Intrusa, Prelúdio, A Vida de Chopin, Klauss, O Loiro, Moulin Rouge, A Vida de Toulouse Lautrec, A Gata, Quem Casa com Maria, Teresa, O Cara Suja, O Pecado de Cada Um, Sangue do Meu Sangue and Dez Vidas.

During her career, Rita worked alongside many television actors and actresses including Vera Campos, Débora Duarte, Irenita Duarte, Lisa Negri, and Ana Rosa. She became popularly known when she interpreted Iara, alongside Sergio Cardoso, in the soap opera O Cara Suja, in 1965. She returned to film-making and made the movies Diário de Uma Prostituta and A Noite das Depravadas.

Rita also worked as voice actress in the Brazilian dubbing, taking the role of several characters from the cartoon Woody Woodpecker, and the character Yumi of Spectreman, but her voice is mostly recognized by the character Samantha Stephens on the television show Bewitched. In 1982, she starred in the miniseries Maria Stuart, produced by TV Cultura. She died of a heart attack in Curitiba in 1988.

== Filmography ==
=== Telenovelas ===
- A Intrusa (1962)
- Prelúdio (1962)
- Klauss, o Loiro (1963)
- Moulin Rouge, A Vida de Toulouse Lautrec (1963)
- A Gata (1964)
- Quem Casa com Maria? (1964)
- Teresa (1965)
- O Cara Suja (1965)
- O Pecado de Cada Um (1965-1966)
- Redenção (1966-1968)
- Legião dos Esquecidos (1968-1969)
- Sangue do Meu Sangue (1969-1970)
- Dez Vidas (1969-1970)
- Mais Forte que o Ódio (1970)
- Maria Stuart (1982)

=== Voice actress ===
- Samantha Stephens (Elizabeth Montgomery) in the series Bewitched
- Libby, in the series Naked City
- Jan, in the animation Space Ghost
- Dubbed actresses in the series, Lost in Space, I Dream of Jeannie and Spectreman
- Characters in the animation Woody Woodpecker
