= List of Brazilian films of 1964 =

This is a list of films produced in Brazil in 1964.

Title	Director	Cast	Genre	Notes
A Morte em Três Tempos	Fernando Campos	Nelson Camargo, Paulo Emílio Sales Gomes, Joseph Guerreiro	Crime	
As Moradas	Sylvio Back			
Asfalto Selvagem	J. B. Tanko	Vera Vianna, Jece Valadão, Maria Helena Dias	Drama	
At Midnight I Will Take Your Soul	José Mojica Marins	José Mojica Marins, Magda Mei, Nivaldo Lima	Horror	
Black God, White Devil	Glauber Rocha	Geraldo Del Rey, Yoná Magalhães, Othon Bastos	Crime drama	
Crônica da Cidade Amada	Carlos Hugo Christensen	Procópio Ferreira, Magalhães Graça, Jardel Filho	Comedy	
Der Satan mit den roten Haaren	Alfons Stummer	Paulo Afonso, Paulo Afonso, Luis Alb	Drama	
Golden Goddess of Rio Beni	Franz Eichhorn, Eugenio Martín	Pierre Brice, Gillian Hills, René Deltgen	Adventure	
The Guns	Ruy Guerra	Maria Adélia, Joel Barcellos, Leonidas Bayer	Drama	
Integração Racial	Paulo Cesar Saraceni			
La Leona	Armando Bo	Isabel Sarli, Armando Bo, Mónica Grey		
Lana, Queen of the Amazons	Cyl Farney, Géza von Cziffra	Anton Diffring, Catherine Schell, Christian Wolff	Adventure	
Men and Women	Walter Hugo Khouri	Norma Bengell, Odete Lara, Mário Benvenutti	Drama	
O Caipora	Oscar Santana	Maria Adélia, Iva de Carla, João Di Sordi	Drama	
O Grito da Terra	Olney São Paulo	Roque Araújo, Lucy de Carvalho, João Di Sordi	Drama	
O Lamparina	Glauco Mirko Laurelli	Amácio Mazzaropi, Geny Prado, Manoel Vieira	Comedy	
O Monumento	Jurandyr Passos Noronha			
O Santo Módico	Robert Mazoyer	Irene Borinski, Edgard Carvalho, Heitor Dias	Comedy	
O Tropeiro	Aécio F. Andrade	Carlos Aquino, Marina Batista, Rodolfo Berkiner	Adventure	
O Vigilante Contra o Crime	Ary Fernandes	Amândio, Lola Brah, Márcia Cardeal	Adventure	
O Vigilante e os Cinco Valentes	Ary Fernandes	Maria Anita, Jairo Arco e Flexa, Tony Campello	Adventure	
Obrigado a matar	Eduardo Llorente	Roberto Barreto, Lima Batista, José Carvalho	Drama	
Pão de Açúcar	Paul Sylbert	Rossano Brazzi, Rhonda Fleming, Odete Lara		
Procura-se uma Rosa	Jece Valadão	Rodolfo Arena, Raul da Mata, Jorge Dória	Crime	
Sangue na Madrugada	Jacy Campos	Delly Azevedo, Célia Bandeira, Riva Blanche	Crime	
Seara Vermelha	Alberto D'Aversa	Maria Adélia, Ivanilde Alves, Marilda Alves	Drama	
Terra dos Amores	Afonso Viana	Maria Aparecida, Blecaute, Nelson Ferraz	Comedy	
That World and Mine	Sérgio Ricardo	Antonio Pitanga, Léa Bulcão, Sérgio Ricardo		
Um Morto ao Telefone	Watson Macedo	Eliana, Oswaldo Loureiro, Joana Fomm	Crime	
Un sueño y nada más	Diego Santillán	Leonidas Bayer, Sadi Cabral, Paulo Copacabana	Crime	
Viagem aos Seios de Duília	Carlos Hugo Christensen	Rodolfo Mayer, Nathália Timberg, Oswaldo Louzada	Drama	

== See also ==
- 1964 in Brazil
