= 1903 in Brazil =

Events in the year 1903 in Brazil.

== Incumbents ==
=== Federal government ===
- President: Rodrigues Alves
- Vice President: Silviano Brandão

=== Governors ===
- Alagoas: Euclides Vieira Malta (till 12 June), Joaquim Paulo Vieira Malta (from 12 June)
- Amazonas: Silvério José Néri
- Bahia: Severino Vieira
- Ceará: Pedro Augusto Borges
- Goiás: José Xavier de Almeida
- Maranhão: Manuel Lopes da Cunha
- Mato Grosso: Antônio Pedro Alves de Barros, then Antônio Pais de Barros
- Minas Gerais: Francisco Salles
- Pará: Augusto Montenegro
- Paraíba: José Peregrino de Araújo
- Paraná: Francisco Xavier da Silva
- Pernambuco: Antônio Gonçalves Ferreira
- Piauí: Arlindo Francisco Nogueira
- Rio Grande do Norte: Alberto Maranhão
- Rio Grande do Sul: Antônio Augusto Borges de Medeiros
- Santa Catarina:
- São Paulo:
- Sergipe:

=== Vice governors ===
- Rio Grande do Norte:
- São Paulo:

== Events ==
- 29 June - A meteorite fall, classification H5, is observed in Uberaba, Minas Gerais.
- 11 November - The Treaty of Petrópolis ends tension between Brazil and Bolivia over the then-Bolivian territory of Acre (today the Acre state).

== Births ==
- 3 August - Aimée de Heeren, socialite (died 2006)
- 7 November - Ary Barroso, composer, pianist, songwriter, soccer commentator, and talent-show host (died 1964)
- 22 December - Joanídia Sodré, music educator, pianist, conductor and composer (died 1975)
- 30 December - Cândido Portinari, painter (died 1962)

== Deaths ==
- 22 February - Victor Meirelles, painter (born 1832)

== See also ==
- 1903 in Brazilian football
