= João Acácio Pereira da Costa =

Notorious Brazilian criminal of the 1960s

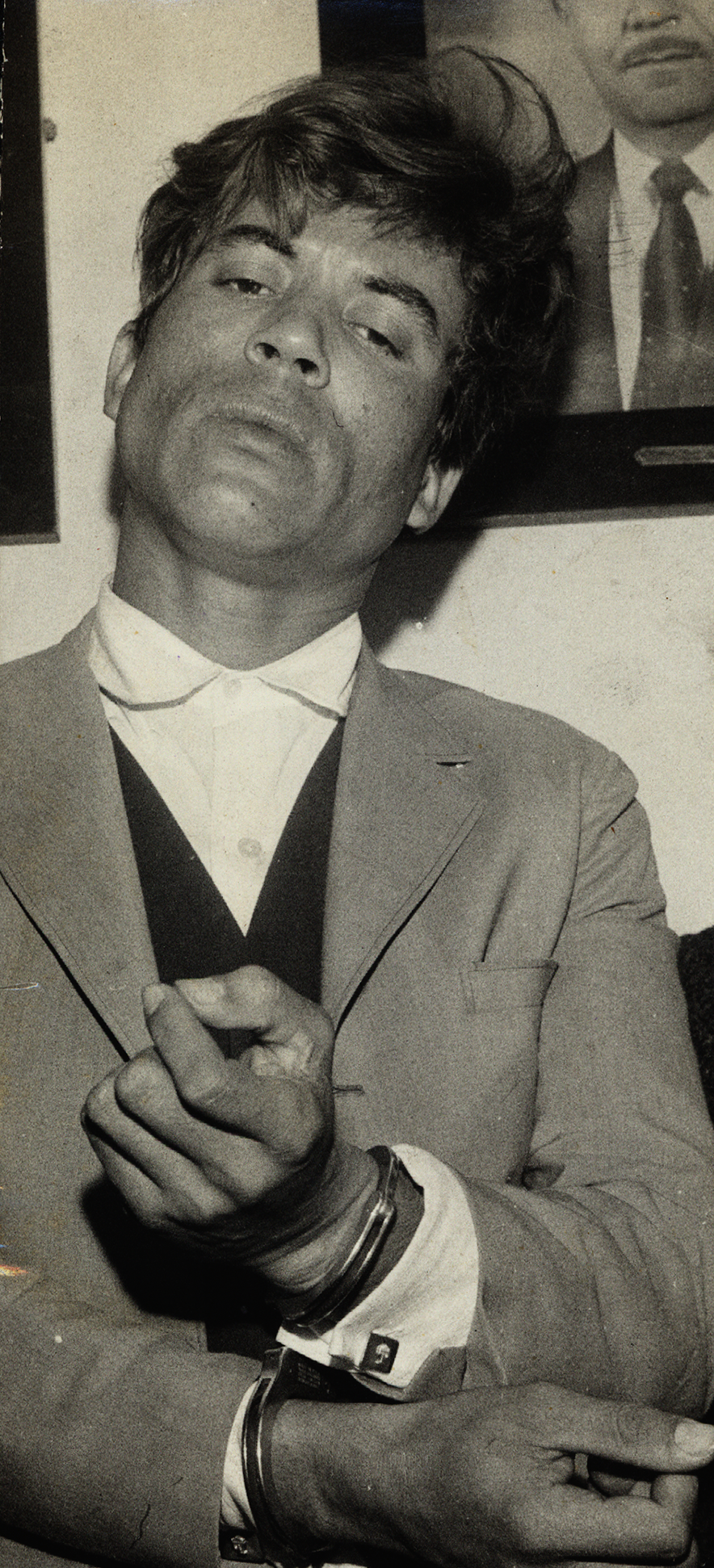
- João Acácio Pereira da Costa in 1967
- Born: João Acácio Pereira da Costa; June 24, 1942; Joinville, Santa Catarina, Brazil.
- Died: January 5, 1998 (aged 55); Joinville, Santa Catarina, Brazil.
- Cause of death: Murdered
- Other name: The Red Light Bandit
- Status: Deceased
- Convictions: Murder (4 counts) Attempted murder (7 counts) Robbery (77 counts)
- Penalty: 351 years, 9 months, and three days.

Details
- Victims: 4+ killed 77+ burglarized 100+ raped
- Span of crimes: c.1962–1967
- Country: Brazil
- State: São Paulo
- Date apprehended: August 8, 1967

João Acácio Pereira da Costa (Jun 24, 1942 – Jan 5, 1998), known as "O Bandido da Luz Vermelha" (translated to English as "The Red Light Bandit"), was a notorious Brazilian serial killer of the 1960s. He gained notoriety due to a series of crimes in the São Paulo region, Brazil.

== Early years ==
João Acácio became an orphan at the young age of four. He and his older brother, Joaquim Tavares Pereira, were then raised by an uncle. In 1967, the year he was arrested in Curitiba, Paraná, the Red Light Bandit recounted that he and his brother were subjected to forced labor by their uncle in exchange for food. The criminal further claimed that both of them were subjected to physical and psychological torture by their relative, who denied the accusations.

As a pre-adolescent, he was sexually assaulted by older boys who were his rivals. These traumas he experienced seem to have triggered his worst instincts.

In his adolescence, he moved to the state of São Paulo to escape the thefts he committed in his home state, settling in the city of Santos), where he portrayed himself as the son of farmers and a good young man, leading a quiet life in the place he chose to reside. However, contrary to the "good guy" image, he committed his crimes in São Paulo and returned unscathed to Santos.

He also engaged in car thefts and dismantling in Rio de Janeiro. "He would go to Rio by bus and return by car. He once stole 50 vehicles," says journalist and writer Gonçalo Junior, author of the book "Famigerado! — A História de Luz Vermelha, o bandido que aterrorizou São Paulo."

He deceived the police by posing as four different assailants: the incendiary bandit who set fire to the corridors of houses to cause panic and wake up the residents, the masked bandit who stole jewelry, the monkey bandit, for using a car jack to open windows, and the Red Light Bandit, a nickname he acquired for using a flashlight with a reddish rim that he bought from an old department store called Mappin.

He used to commit robberies four days a week, always between 2 and 4 in the early morning. This went on for over five years, with dozens of robberies, rapes, and homicides attributed to him by the police. He had a preference for mansions and had his own style of committing crimes, such as striking during the last hours of the night, cutting off the house's power supply, covering his face with a handkerchief, and his signature move: carrying a flashlight with a red lens. All of this drew the attention of the press, earning him the moniker "Bandido da Luz Vermelha," in reference to the notorious American criminal Caryl Chessman, who had the same nickname.

The Red Light Bandit was vain, dressing in a way that attracted attention, with bright colors, extravagant hats, and cowboy scarves covering his face. He liked to wear wigs and would often pose as a musician, carrying a stolen guitar slung over his shoulder.

He spent the money he obtained from his robberies on women and nightclubs, and it took the police five years to identify him, finally achieving this after he left his fingerprints on a mansion's window.

== Crimes and conviction ==
João Acácio was arrested on August 8, 1967, in the city of Curitiba, after the police discovered that he was living under the false identity of Roberto da Silva.

During the interrogation, he confessed to four crimes:

- The first incident occurred on October 3, 1966, when 19-year-old student Walter Bedran, while attempting to surprise the intruder who had just entered his backyard in Sumaré, São Paulo, was shot in the head.
- Ten days later, the victim was 23-year-old laborer José Enéas da Costa, who was killed during a fight with the criminal in a bar in the Bela Vista neighborhood.
- On June 7, 1967, in Jardim América, industrialist Jean von Christian de Száraspatak was shot and killed during an exchange of gunfire as he resisted a robbery attempt.
- On July 6, 1967, João Acácio also killed the security guard José Fortunato, who tried to prevent his entry into the mansion where he was stationed in the Ipiranga neighborhood.

As a result, he was convicted of four murders, seven attempted homicides, and 77 robberies, receiving a sentence of 351 years, 9 months, and three days in prison.

After serving the 30 years prescribed by law, he was released on the night of August 26, 1997, and returned to the city of Joinville. He maintained a certain level of popularity because he had an obsession with wearing red clothes, and when someone asked for his autograph, he simply wrote the word "Autógrafo" (Autograph).

== Death ==
After four months and twenty days of freedom, João Acácio was shot and killed on January 5, 1998, during a bar brawl. According to the newspaper Notícias Populares at the time, the assailant, who was the host of João, claimed to have fired to save his brother's life. João had allegedly grabbed and threatened him with a knife after a dispute over a supposed incident of sexual harassment involving Red Light, the assailant's mother, and wife.

In November 2004, the assailant was acquitted by the Joinville Court, confirming that the act was in self-defense.

== In popular culture ==
His life of crime inspired the 1968 film O Bandido da Luz Vermelha directed by filmmaker Rogério Sganzerla, in which he was portrayed by actor Paulo Villaça. Although the film is based on real events, the ending was altered to have his character commit suicide.

"Luz nas trevas - A volta do bandido da luz vermelha" is the sequel to Rogério Sganzerla's original film and was one of the selections for the international competition at the 63rd Locarno Festival in Switzerland. The film is directed by Ícaro Martins and Helena Ignez, Rogério Sganzerla's widow, and stars the singer Ney Matogrosso. It was filmed in 2009 and premiered in 2010.

In 2019, his story was told in the book "Famigerado! — A História de Luz Vermelha, o bandido que aterrorizou São Paulo," written by journalist and writer Gonçalo Junior.

His story was turned into a song by the rock band Ira! in "Rubro Zorro," which opens their third album, "Psicoacústica" (1988). The track also includes some lines from the 1968 film "O Bandido da Luz Vermelha" directed by Rogério Sganzerla.

The horrorcore singer Patrick Horla also made a reference to his personality as the basis for the song "O bandido da lupa vermelha."

== See also ==
- List of serial killers in Brazil
