= 1964 in Brazil =

== Incumbents ==
=== Federal government ===
- President:
  - João Goulart (until 1 April)
  - Ranieri Mazzilli (from 1 April to 15 April)
  - Marshal Castelo Branco (from 15 April)
- Minister of War:
  - Dantas Ribeiro (until 4 April)
  - Artur da Costa e Silva (from 4 April)
- Minister of Mines and Energy:
  - Oliveira Brito (until April 4)
  - Artur da Costa e Silva (from 4 April until 17 April)
  - Mauro Thibau (from 17 April)

=== Governors ===
- Acre: Vacant
- Alagoas: Luis Cavalcante
- Amazonas:
  - Plínio Ramos Coelho (until 27 June)
  - Artur César Ferreira Reis (from 27 June)
- Bahia: Lomanto Júnior
- Ceará: Virgilio Távora
- Espírito Santo: Francisco Lacerda de Aguiar
- Goiás:
  - Mauro Borges (until 26 November)
  - Carlos de Meira Mattos (from 26 November)
- Guanabara: Carlos Lacerda
- Maranhão: Newton de Barros Belo
- Mato Grosso: Fernando Corrêa da Costa
- Minas Gerais: José de Magalhães Pinto
- Pará:
  - Aurélio do Carmo (until 15 June)
  - Jarbas Passarinho (from 15 June)
- Paraíba: Pedro Gondim
- Paraná: Nei Braga
- Pernambuco:
  - Miguel Arraes (until 2 April)
  - Paulo Pessoa Guerra (from 2 April)
- Piauí: Petrônio Portella
- Rio de Janeiro:
  - Badger da Silveira (until 1 May)
  - Cordolino Ambrósio (1 May-4 May)
  - Pablo Torres (from 4 May)
- Rio Grande do Norte: Aluízio Alves
- Rio Grande do Sul: Ildo Meneghetti
- Santa Catarina: Celso Ramos
- São Paulo: Ademar de Barros
- Sergipe:
  - João de Seixas Dória (until 2 April)
  - Sebastião Celso de Carvalho (from 2 April)

=== Vice governors ===
- Alagoas: Teotônio Brandão Vilela
- Bahia: Orlando Moscoso
- Ceará: Joaquim de Figueiredo Correia
- Espírito Santo: Rubens Rangel
- Goiás: Vacant
- Maranhão: Alfredo Salim Duailibe
- Mato Grosso: Jose Garcia Neto
- Minas Gerais: Clóvis Salgado da Gama
- Pará:
  - Newton Burlamaqui de Miranda (until 9 June)
  - Agostinho de Meneses de Monteiro (from 15 June)
- Paraíba: André Avelino de Paiva Gadelha
- Paraná: Afonso Alves de Camargo Neto (from 20 March)
- Pernambuco:
  - Paulo Pessoa Guerra (until 2 April)
  - Vacant thereafter (from 2 April)
- Piauí: João Clímaco d'Almeida
- Rio de Janeiro:
  - João Batista da Costa (until 1 May)
  - Vacant thereafter (1 May-4 May)
  - Teotônio Araújo (from 4 May)
- Rio Grande do Norte: Teodorico Bezerra
- Santa Catarina: Armindo Marcílio Doutel de Andrade
- São Paulo: Laudo Natel
- Sergipe:
  - Celso Carvalho (until 1 April)
  - Vacant thereafter (from 1 April)

== Events ==
=== January ===
- 7 January: French actress Brigitte Bardot arrives in Rio de Janeiro and spends her summer in the resort of Búzios, drawing the attention of the national and international press to the place. Thanks to Bardot's visit, Búzios has now become one of the hottest spots in the Brazilian summer.

=== February ===
- 28 February: Nova Independência is established in São Paulo.

=== March ===
- 13 March: President João Goulart makes a speech at a rally in Central do Brasil, where he defends democracy and announces significant political reforms, such as nationalisation and social justice programs.
- 19 March: The first March of the Family with God for Liberty takes place in São Paulo, with the participation of 500,000 people. Protestors ask for military intervention, in response to Goulart's political reforms speech.
- 25 March: Corporal Anselmo leads sailors of the lower ranks in a revolt against their poor conditions of life and superiors, as well as supporting President Goulart's "basic reforms".
- 27 March: The Sailors' Revolt ends, after Goulart gives amnesty to the sailors and appoints Paulo Mário da Cunha Rodrigues as Minister of the Navy.
- 31 March-1 April: President João Goulart is overthrown in a military coup, after a sequence of events; among the movement of military troops from Minas Gerais to Rio de Janeiro and the positioning of the US navy on the Brazilian coast.

=== April ===
- 2 April: The National Congress, in an extraordinary session, declares that the President of the Chamber of Deputies, Ranieri Mazzilli, assumes the interim Presidency of the Republic.
- 11 April: The country holds its first indirect elections after the coup. Castelo Branco is elected the next president by the National Congress.
- 13 April: Ranieri Mazzilli revokes the SUPRA (Superintendence of Agrarian Policy) decree, that was signed by João Goulart at the Central Rally in Rio de Janeiro.
- 15 April: Humberto de Alencar Castelo Branco is sworn in as the 26th President of Brazil, and the first of the Military Regime.

=== May ===
- 13 May: Brazil terminates its diplomatic relations with Cuba.

=== June ===
- 10 June: The GTEPE (Special Project Study and Study Group), a precursor to GETEPE (Space Project Study and Executive Group), is created.

=== August ===
- 22 August: President Castelo Branco creates the National Housing Bank, to build homes for the middle class and to generate jobs.

=== November ===
- 30 November: President Humberto de Alencar Castelo Branco promulgates the Land Statute, a law that regulates rights and obligations related to rural real estate.

=== December ===
- 1 December: Energy rationing ends in São Paulo.
- 31 December: The Central Bank of Brazil and the National Monetary Council are established.

== Births ==
=== January ===
- January 11: Patrícia Pillar, actress
- January 18: Gustavo Bebianno, lawyer and politician (d. 2020)
- January 20: Márcia Cabrita, actress (died 2017)

=== February ===
- February 16: Bebeto, retired footballer and politician

=== April ===
- April 18: Lourenço Mutarelli, underground comic book writer
- April 21: Anna Muylaert, television and film director

=== May ===
- May 23: Beto Brant, filmmaker

=== July ===
- July 10: Dalton Vigh, actor

=== August ===
- August 17: Jorginho, coach and retired footballer

=== September ===
- September 11:
  - Alexandre Lippiani, actor and voice actor (d. 1997)
  - Damares Alves, Minister of Human Rights, Family and Women

=== October ===
- October 26: Irving São Paulo, actor (d. 2006)

=== November ===
- November 20: Leonardo Medeiros, actor

=== December ===
- December 7: Roberta Close, transgender model

== Deaths ==
=== January ===
- January 20: Aníbal Machado (born 1894)

=== February ===
- February 9: Ary Barroso, composer, pianist, soccer commentator, and talent-show host (born 1903)

=== November ===
- November 6: Anita Malfatti, artist (born 1889)

== See also ==
- 1964 in Brazilian football
- List of Brazilian films of 1964
