= All Nudity Shall Be Punished =

1972 film

- Theatrical release poster
- Directed by: Arnaldo Jabor
- Written by: Arnaldo Jabor
- Based on: Toda Nudez Será Castigada by Nelson Rodrigues
- Produced by: Arnaldo Jabor
- Starring: Paulo Porto; Darlene Glória
- Cinematography: Lauro Escorel
- Edited by: Rafael Justo Valverde
- Music by: Astor Piazzolla
- Production companies: Ventania Filmes; R.F. Farias
- Distributed by: Ipanema Filmes; Embrafilme
- Release date: 8 March 1973
- Running time: 102 minutes
- Country: Brazil
- Language: Portuguese

All Nudity Shall Be Punished (Portuguese: Toda Nudez Será Castigada) is a 1973 Brazilian drama film based on Nelson Rodrigues' play by the same name and directed by Arnaldo Jabor. It was entered into the 23rd Berlin International Film Festival where it won the Silver Bear.

== Cast ==
- Paulo Porto as Herculano
- Darlene Glória as Geni
- Elza Gomes as aunt who bathes Serginho
- Paulo César Peréio as Patrício
- Isabel Ribeiro as young aunt
- Henriqueta Brieba as bespectacled aunt
- Sérgio Mamberti as gay man at bordello
- Orazir Pereira as Bolivian thief
- Abel Pera as old poet, Geni's client
- Waldir Onofre as drunkard who fights Serginho
- Teresa Mitota (as Mitota)
- Paulo Sacks as Serginho
- Hugo Carvana as Commissioner
