= Eliezer Gomes =

Brazilian actor

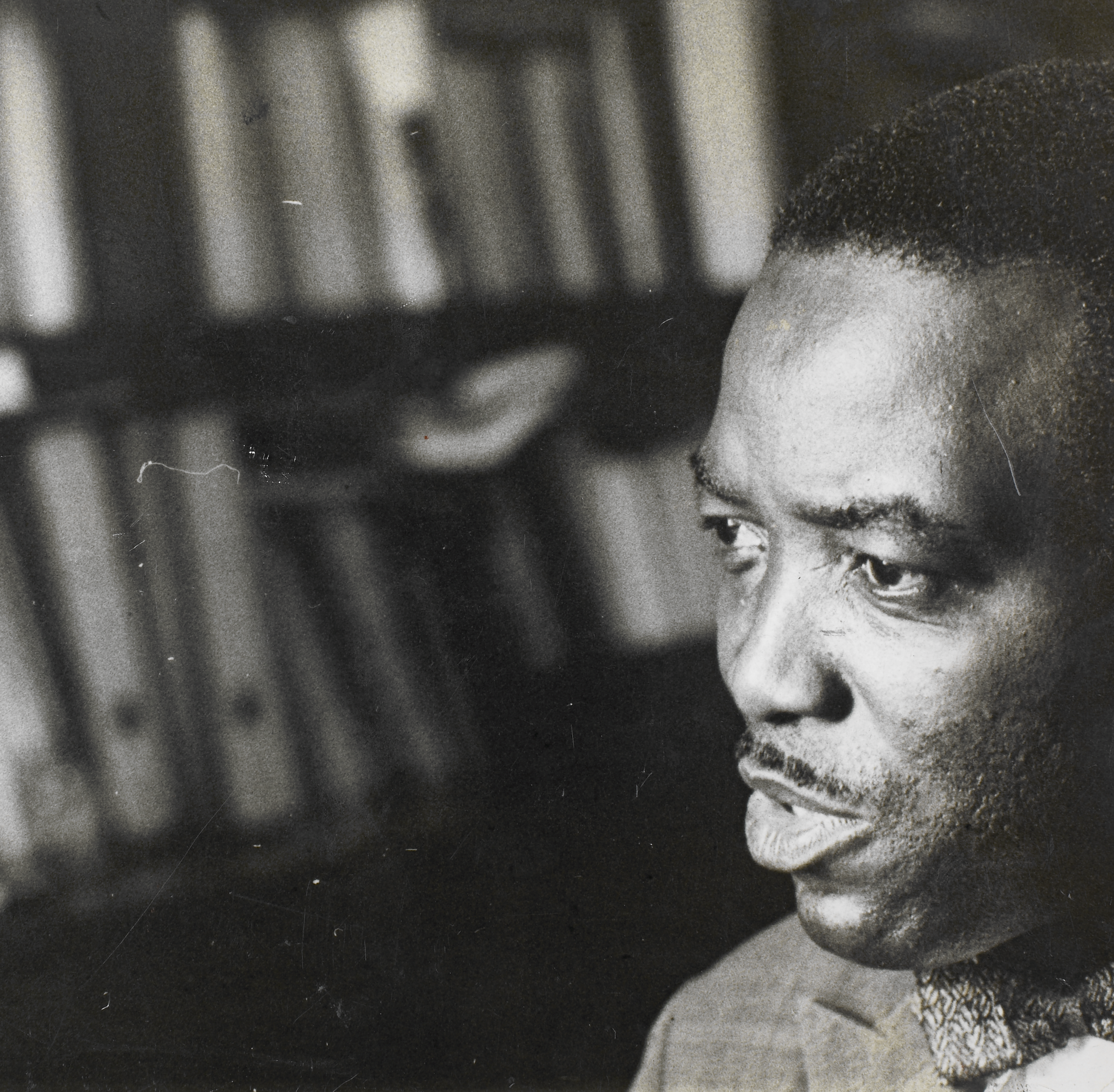
- Born: 2 April 1920; Brazil
- Died: 12 February 1979 (aged 58); Rio de Janeiro, Brazil
- Years active: 1962–1975

Eliezer Gomes (2 April, 1920–12 February, 1979) was a Brazilian actor. Born in Santo Antônio de Pádua or Conceição de Macabu, he debuted on Roberto Farias' 1962 film O Assalto ao Trem Pagador. In 1975, he won the Gramado Film Festival Best Actor Award for his performance on Walter Hugo Khouri's O Anjo da Noite.

== Selected filmography ==
- O Assalto ao Trem Pagador (1962)
- Choque de Sentimentos (1965)
- Faustão (1971)
- O Anjo da Noite (1974)
- Joanna Francesa (1975)
