= Sinhá Moça (2006 TV series) =

- Also known as: Little Missy
- Genre: Telenovela
- Created by: Benedito Ruy Barbosa
- Based on: Sinhá Moça by Maria Dezonne Pacheco Fernandes
- Directed by: Ricardo Waddington; Rogério Gomes
- Starring: Débora Falabella; Danton Mello; Osmar Prado; Patrícia Pillar; Cris Vianna; Celso Frateschi; Milton Gonçalves; Zezé Motta
- Opening theme: "Sinhá Moça" by Leonardo
- Country of origin: Brazil
- Original language: Portuguese
- No. of episodes: 185

Production
- Running time: 50 minutes
- Production company: TV Globo

Original release
- Network: TV Globo
- Release: March 13 – October 13, 2006

Related
- Alma Gêmea; O Profeta

Sinhá Moça (English title: Little Missy) is a Brazilian telenovela produced and broadcast by TV Globo. It premiered on March 13, 2006, replacing Alma Gêmea, and ended on October 13, 2006, replaced by O Profeta. It is written by Benedito Ruy Barbosa, inspired by the eponymous book by Maria Dezonne Pacheco Fernandes, it is a readaptation for television, and counted on the collaboration of authors Edmara Barbosa and Edilene Barbosa.

It stars Débora Falabella, Danton Mello, Osmar Prado, Patrícia Pillar, Cris Vianna, Celso Frateschi, Milton Gonçalves and Zezé Motta.

== Plot ==
Pro-slavery Monarchists and anti-slavery Republicans confront each other in Araruna, a small fictional town in the interior of the state of São Paulo, in 1886, two years before the promulgation of the Lei Áurea ("Golden Law"), that abolished slavery nationwide in Brazil. The novel depicts the love story of the beautiful and rich Sinhá Moça - the daughter of the ruthless slaveholder, Baron Ferreira de Araruna, and the submissive mother Candida - with the young abolitionist lawyer Dr. Rodolfo Fontes - son of Dr. Fontes and Inêz. Together, they face the difficulties in the campaign for the abolition of slaves. The novel begins with Sinhá Moça at the age of ten. She is with Rafael, a half-breed slave with green eyes and her great childhood friend. They witness the death of an elderly slave called Dad Joseph, Rafael's great-grandfather, and his mother's great-grandfather, Maria das Dores. Dad Jose is whipped on the trunk by the coward Bruno, commanded by the Baron of Araruna. Even as a child, Sinhá Moça already confronts her father and, with Rafael's help, at the age of twelve, they untied Dad José, who dies in their arms. Before, Dad José reveals to Rafael that he is the son of Barão Ferreira de Araruna. This revelation leaves the boy shaken, for he already likes Sinhá Moça as a man. Luckily, the girl does not listen to this conversation, she does not even suspect that he is her half-brother. Rafael is going to talk to his mother, the slave Maria das Dores, who asks her son to keep a secret; nor is the Baron aware of his paternity. Barão Ferreira de Araruna believes that Rafael is the son of his cousin Aristides, mistress of Maria das Dores. The maid had lain with the Baron once and by force. Even though she was pregnant, she continued to lie down with Aristides, but she soon revealed to him what had happened. Aristides, aware of everything, wanted to buy Maria das Dores, but his cousin, Mr. Ferreira, did not let the woman be sold. For some years Mrs. Dores and Rafael continue to pick up and suffer at the hands of Mr. Ferreira. Rafael, then, swear revenge against the Baron. Years later, however, Maria das Dores and her son are sold to a good man, who takes them to the capital of São Paulo. Some time later, with the death of Aristides, Maria das Dores will inherit a house and good money, enough to buy her freedom and that of her son Rafael. Sinhá Moça cries a lot with Rafael's farewell and will console herself with Bá, a slave who nursed her since she was baby, and who had her son stolen by Mr. Ferreira as soon as the child was born, out of sheer evil. Bá has transferred her love for the stolen son to Sinhá, and treats her very well, and forgives him for stolen, and hopes one day to find her son again. Nine years pass and the year 1886 arrives. Sinhá Moça is now a beautiful and educated lady, who studies in secondary education in order to graduate in the normal course, to teach in the middle school of Araruna. She lived in a boarding school with her friends four years ago, against her father's wishes, who thought she should get married early and have many sons to run the farm. His mother, however, was able to impose herself, believing in the worth of study for a woman's life. As soon as her studies are over, Sinhá Moça returns to Araruna. On the train trip, she meets Rodolfo, an interesting young man who also annoys her, especially when they talk about Abolitionism. Rodolfo disguises his advanced ideas, believing that the girl, the Baron's daughter, must certainly be a enslaved. It was a misunderstanding. Sinhá Moça is also an abolitionist and criticizes the attitudes of her father, the Baron de Araruna. Even while lying, Rodolfo manages to make a big impression on Sinhá Moça. In time, she will fall in love with him and live a great love, always hidden from her father. Especially when the Baron discovers that Rodolfo is an abolitionist, and he lied all the time just to get close to his daughter. Sinhá Moça and Rodolfo, along with other defenders of freedom, invade slave quarters at night and let the blacks free, giving them to the abolitionist associations, which guide them towards the new life. This causes commentaries in the city of Araruna, before the austere farmers, led by the cruel Baron. On the other side of the story is Dimas (who is actually the boy Rafael, ex-freed slave), who returns to Araruna, very powerful, wanting revenge, with his obstinate fight to destroy the Baron. Before being sold by the Baron, Dimas / Rafael was Sinhá Moça's great childhood friend. After being emancipated, he assumed the name of Dimas, and became the right-hand man of Augustus, a committed journalist and abolitionist, who struggles to spread his ideals through the weekly newspaper A Voz de Araruna, with Barão Ferreira de Araruna. In love with Dimas is Juliana, the journalist's granddaughter. Juliana and he will live a great love, and both, together with Sinhá Moça and Rodolfo, will move heaven and earth to destroy the Baron and arrest all the slave owners. They founded an abolitionist society, and help fugitive slaves.

== Cast ==
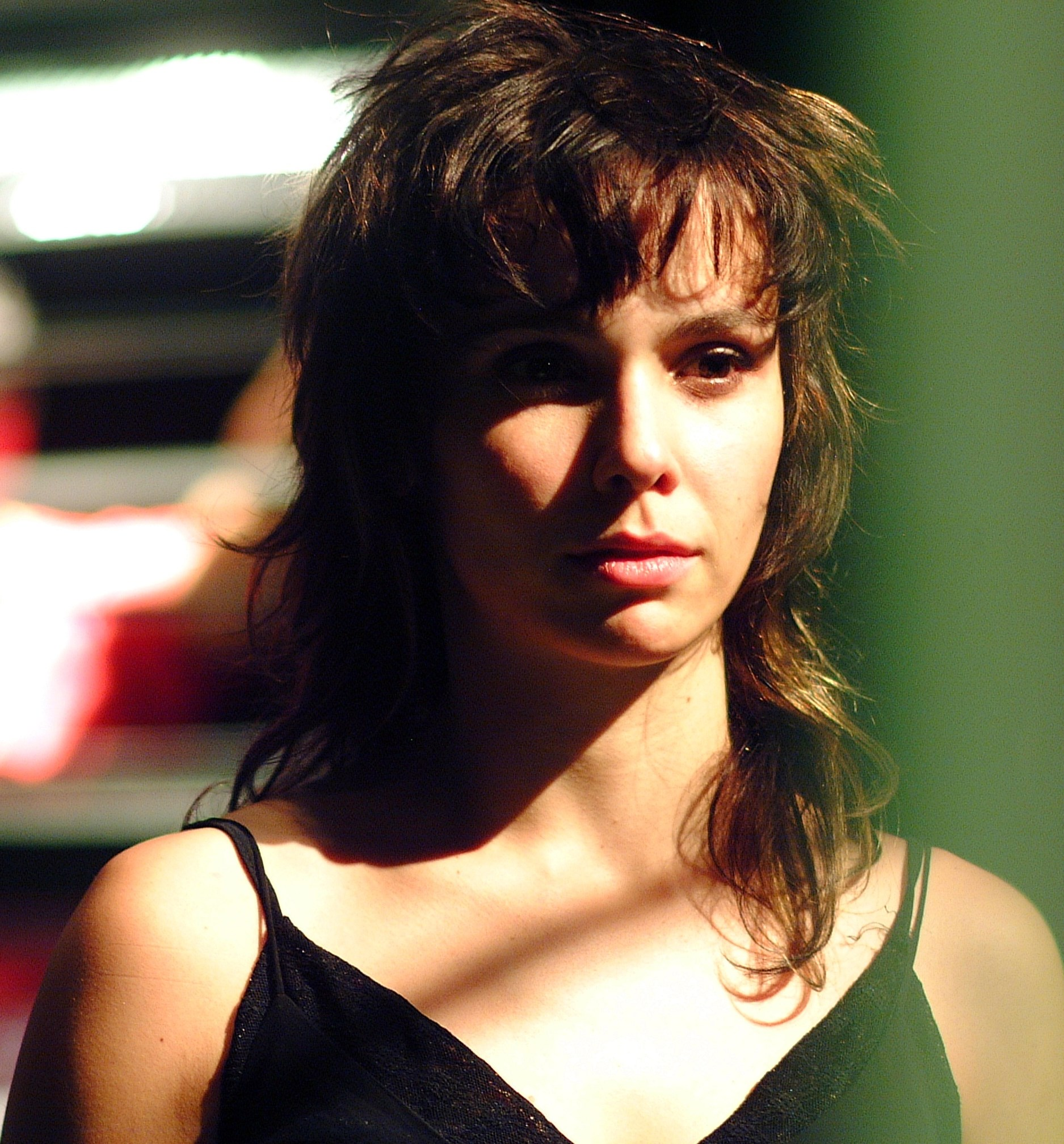
Débora Falabella as Sinhá Moça, Maria das Graças Ferreira

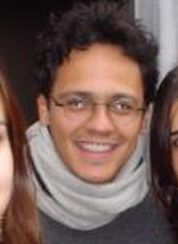
Danton Mello as Rodolfo Fontes

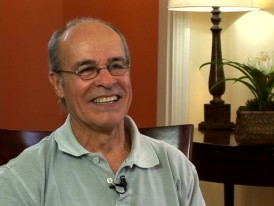
Osmar Prado as Coronel Ferreira, Barão of Araruna

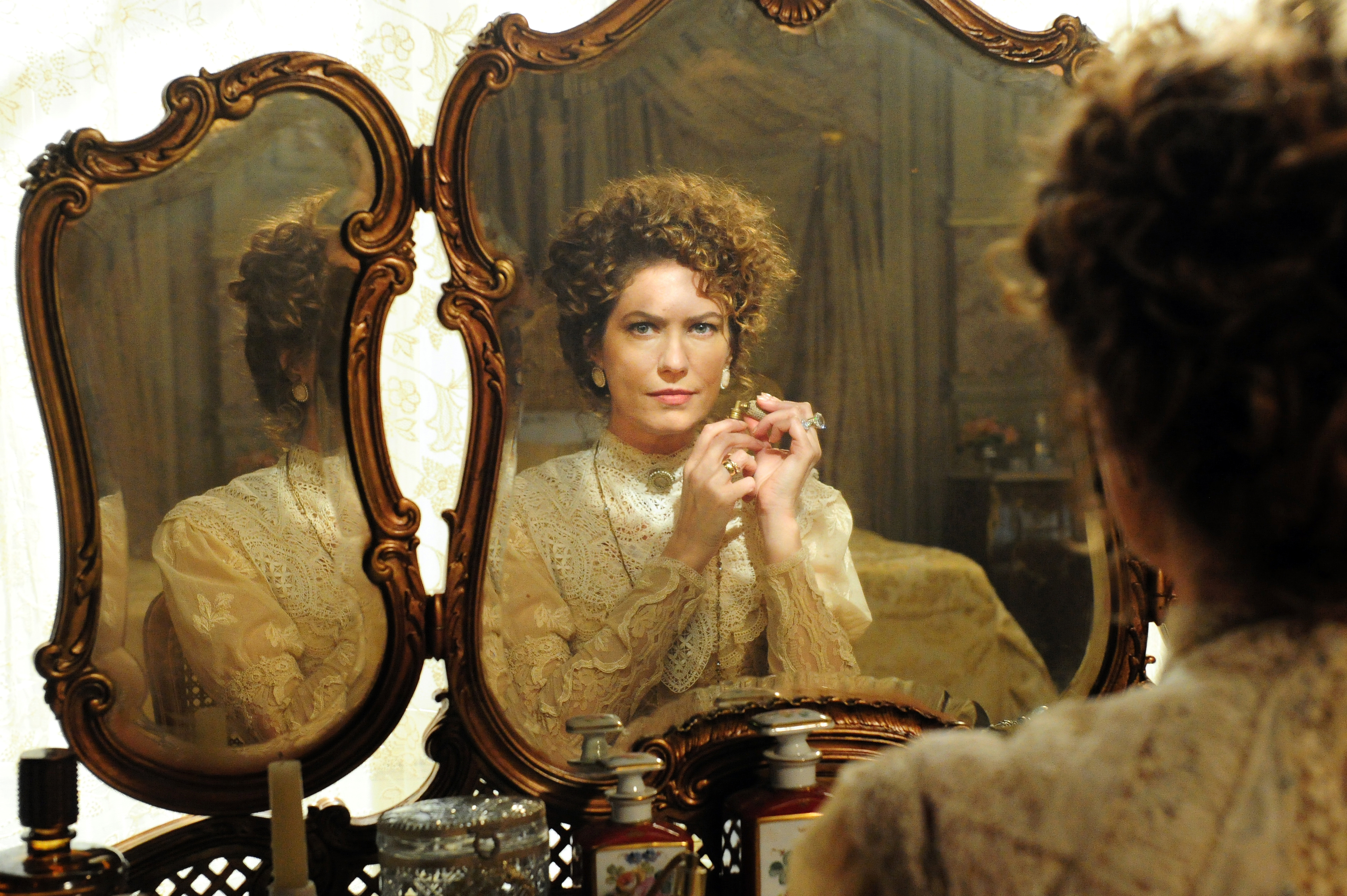
Patrícia Pillar as Candida Ferreira, Baronesa de Araruna

Actor / Actress	Character
Débora Falabella	(Sinhá Moça) Maria das Graças Ferreira
Danton Mello	Rodolfo Garcia Fontes
Osmar Prado	Coronel José Ferreira, Barão de Araruna
Patrícia Pillar	Candida Ferreira, Baronesa de Araruna
Humberto Martins	Feitor Bruno
Zezé Motta	Virgínia (Bá)
Ísis Valverde	Ana Luísa Maria Teixeira (Ana do Véu)
Bruno Gagliasso	Ricardo Garcia Fontes
Eriberto Leão	Rafael/Dimas
Vanessa Giácomo	Juliana
Reginaldo Faria	Dr. Geraldo Fontes
Lu Grimaldi	Inêz Garcia Fontes
Milton Gonçalves	Dad José
Lucy Ramos	Adelaide de Jesus Coutinho
Carlos Vereza	Augusto
Caio Blat	Mário
Chico Anysio	Everaldo Mathias
Ruth de Souza	Mother Maria
Clementino Kelé	Dad Tobias
Oscar Magrini	Manoel Teixeira
José Augusto Branco	Aristides Amorim
Alexandre Moreno	Justino
Maurício Gonçalves	Jungle's Captain (Justo Filho)
Alexandre Rodrigues	Bentinho
Sérgio Menezes	Fulgêncio
Othon Bastos	Coutinho
Elias Gleiser	Frei José
John Herbert	Viriato
Edwin Luisi	Antônio Pereira Martinho
Jackson Antunes	Delegado Antero
Gésio Amadeu	Justo
Gisele Fróes	Nina Teixeira
Cláudio Galvan	Bobó
Guida Vianna	Elvira
Celso Frateschi	Inácio
Flávio Bauraqui	André
Cris Vianna	Maria das Dores (das Dores)
Osvaldo Baraúna	Honório
Edyr Duque	Ruth
Fernando Petelinkar	Tibúrcio
Rogério Falabella	Nogueira
Rosa Marya Colin	Balbina
Eduardo Pires	José Coutinho
Bruno Costa	Renato
Paulo de Almeida	Soldier Antão
Bruno Udovic	Vila
Fabrício Boliveira	Bastião (Sebastião)
Joaquim de Castro	Pedro
Alexandre Akerman	Soldier Pedro
Harley Vas	Soldier Alcebíades
Créo Kellab	Tonho
Guilherme Berenguer	Eduardo Tavares
Alexander Sil	Thomaz

== Production ==
The plot is a remake of one of the greatest television hits of Benedito Ruy Barbosa, the novel Sinhá Moça, which was shown in 1986. The author received endorsement to make a new version of the novel in 2005 after the great success of Cabocla, shown in 2004.

The novel was recorded with an image, which looked like cinema or high definition TV, was edited with computer graphics in post-production, to gain a cinematic effect. Also it was the first Globo's that used the equipment of High Definition Edition, software able to leave the images closer to those of cinema. This fact, in the beginning caused a certain strangeness on the viewers. Also was used base light, a Dutch software, that gave to the novel ares of miniseries.

The recordings of the novel began in 2006 of January, in the cities of Três Rios, in Campinas and Bananal, in the inner of São Paulo. In addition to the colonial farms in São Paulo and Rio de Janeiro, a scenic city with 8,868m2 was also made at the Projac - Globo's main Base, in Jacarepaguá.

Carolina Dieckmann was announced as the protagonist of the novel, Sinhá Moça. However the direction of Globo moved the actress to the novel Cobras & Lagartos and decided to keep Débora Falabella as the main character.

The inverse happened with Bruno Gagliasso. At first he had been chosen to live the protagonist of Cobras & Lagartos, but the author Benedito Ruy Barbosa made a point of the presence of Bruno in his novel. For that reason the actor was redirected to the novel of the 6 pm.

The actress Juliana Baroni played until the end of the role as Ana of The Veil. However the character was with the debutant Isis Valverde. The direction of the novel preferred an unknown name, to create mystery, since the face of the character would only be revealed with the unfolding of the estory. The actress was also banned from appearing in public, as that would end the mystery of the novel. The director kept hidden the face of Isis Valverde, so that it was revealed only during the novel, when his character would take out the veil that covered her face. This would make the curiosity of the "gossip magazines" and viewers. The character took off the veil and the face of the actress was finally known in the chapter aired on April 18, 2006.

Guilherme Berenguer entered the plot to cause some twists. He played Eduardo, an engineer who is enchanted by Ana do Véu (Isis Valverde, originally played by Patrícia Pillar in the 1986 version). Later, she would fall in love with the boy. The first appearance of the actor in the plot was on the Chapter 129, which aired on August 9, 2006.

The telenovela was criticized by scholars and representatives of the black movement in Brazil. According to them, the plot tackled racism abruptly and through scenes of violence and ill-treatment against blacks, it conveyed "an idea of racial inferiority".

== Awards ==
The second version of Sinhá Moça was the first Novel to be nominated in the category "drama series" on the International Emmy Award. In addition, Dad José (Milton Gonçalves) had even presented the award in the category "best children / teenager program" along with the American actress Susan Sarandon, being so the first Brazilian to present it.
