= Joanna Francesa =

1973 film directed by Carlos Diegues

- Theatrical release poster
- Directed by: Carlos Diegues
- Written by: Carlos Diegues
- Produced by: Carlos Alberto Prates Correia
- Starring: Jeanne Moreau; Eliezer Gomes; Carlos Kroeber; Ney Santanna
- Cinematography: Dib Lutfi
- Edited by: Eduardo Escorel
- Music by: Chico Buarque; Roberto Menescal
- Production company: Zoom Cinematográfica
- Distributed by: Ipanema Filmes
- Release dates: 1973 (Brazil); March 12, 1975 (France)
- Running time: 110 minutes
- Countries: France; Brazil
- Language: Portuguese

Joanna Francesa is a 1973 French-Brazilian romantic drama film directed by Carlos Diegues and starring Jeanne Moreau, Eliezer Gomes and Carlos Kroeber.

== Plot ==
In the 1930s, Joanna, the owner of a brothel in São Paulo, goes to Alagoas and falls in love with a customer.

== Cast ==
- Jeanne Moreau - Joanna
- Eliezer Gomes - Gismundo
- Carlos Kroeber - Aureliano
- Ney Santanna - Honório
- Tetê Maciel - Dorinha
- Helber Rangel - Lianinho
- Beto Leão - Ricardo
- Lélia Abramo - Olímpia
- Leina Krespi - Das Dores
- Pierre Cardin - Pierre
