= O Anjo da Noite =

1974 film by Walter Hugo Khouri

- Directed by: Walter Hugo Khouri
- Written by: Hugo Conrado; Fernando César Ferreira
- Screenplay by: Walter Hugo Khouri
- Produced by: Luiz de Miranda Corrêa
- Starring: Selma Egrei; Eliezer Gomes; Lilian Lemmertz
- Cinematography: Antonio Meliande
- Edited by: Mauro Alice
- Release date: September 30, 1974 (Brazil)
- Running time: 84 minutes
- Country: Brazil
- Language: Portuguese

O Anjo da Noite (English: The Angel of the Night) is a 1974 Brazilian film directed and co-written by Walter Hugo Khouri and starring Selma Egrei and Eliezer Gomes.

== Cast ==
- Selma Egrei as Ana
- Eliezer Gomes as Augusto
- Lilian Lemmertz as Raquel
- Pedro Coelho as Marcelo
- Rejane Saliamis as Carolina
- Isabel Montes as Beatriz
- Fernando Amaral as Rodrigo
- Waldomiro Reis

== Awards ==
Gramado Film Festival

1. Best Director (won)
2. Best Actor (won)
3. Best Cinematography (won)
4. Best Film (nominee)

São Paulo Association of Art Critics Awards

1. Best Film (won)
2. Best Music (won)
