= Helber Rangel =

Brazilian movie actor

Helber Rengel
- Born: Helber Silva Rangel; 1944; Rio de Janeiro, Brazil
- Died: 2002 (aged 58)
- Years active: 1973–1987

Helber Rangel (1944–2002) was a Brazilian film actor. He debuted in Carlos Diegues' 1973 film Joanna Francesa. In 1979, he won the Gramado Film Festival Best Actor Award for his performance on Ipojuca Pontes's A Volta do Filho Pródigo.

== Selected filmography ==
- Joanna Francesa (1973)
- Os Condenados (1973)
- Perdida (1976)
- Embalos Alucinantes (1978)
- Memórias do Medo (1979)
- Cabaret Mineiro (1980)
- Lampião e Maria Bonita (1982)
- Luz del Fuego (1982)
- Quincas Borba (1987)
