= Eduardo Escorel =

Brazilian film editor and director

- Born: Eduardo Escorel de Morais; 1945 (age 80–81); São Paulo, Brazil
- Occupations: Editor, director
- Years active: 1965–present
- Relatives: Lauro Escorel (brother)

Eduardo Escorel de Morais (born 1945), most known as Eduardo Escorel, is a Brazilian film editor and director. He debuted as an editor on the Joaquim Pedro de Andrade's The Priest and the Girl (1965). With his first feature film, Lição de Amor, he won the Best Director Award at the 1976 Gramado Film Festival. He was also awarded Best Director for his second film, Ato de Violência, this time at the 1980 Brasília Film Festival. He won Best Editing Award for Guerra Conjugal and O Chamado de Deus at the 1974, and 2000 Brasília Film Festival respectively, and for Dois Perdidos numa Noite Suja at the 2002 Gramado Film Festival.

== Selected filmography ==
- The Priest and the Girl (1965; editor, second unit director)
- My Home Is Copacabana (1965; actor)
- Entranced Earth (1967; editor)
- The Brave Warrior (1968; editor)
- Antonio das Mortes (1969; editor)
- Macunaíma (1969; editor)
- The Heirs (1969; editor)
- Cabezas cortadas (1970; editor)
- The Seven Headed Lion (1970; editor)
- Joanna Francesa (1973; editor)
- They Don't Wear Black-tie (1981; editor)
- Twenty Years Later (1984; editor)
- Villa-Lobos: A Life of Passion (2000; editor)
- Dois Perdidos numa Noite Suja (2002; editor)
- Paulo Moura - Alma Brasileira (2013; director)
