= Two Lost in a Dirty Night =

2002 film directed by José Joffily

- Theatrical release poster
- Directed by: José Joffily
- Written by: Paulo Halm
- Based on: Dois Perdidos numa Noite Suja by Plínio Marcos
- Produced by: José Joffily; Renato Falcão
- Starring: Roberto Bomtempo; Débora Falabella
- Cinematography: Nonato Estrela
- Edited by: Eduardo Escorel
- Music by: David Tygel
- Production company: Coevos Filmes
- Distributed by: Pandora Filmes; Riofilme
- Release date: 2002
- Running time: 100 minutes
- Country: Brazil
- Language: Portuguese
- Budget: R$1.1 million ($497,174)
- Box office: R$176.541 ($79,792)

Two Lost in a Dirty Night (Portuguese: Dois Perdidos numa Noite Suja) is a 2002 Brazilian film directed by José Joffily. Based on the play of the same name by Plínio Marcos, it tells the story of Tonho (Roberto Bomtempo) and Paco (Débora Falabella).

== Plot ==
Two Lost in a Dirty Night follows two Brazilian illegal immigrants living in New York City, United States. Paco, a tomboy whose real name is Rita, is very aggressive, strange and mysterious. Antônio, nicknamed Tonho, wants to return to Brazil, because he had no success living in America. They live in a kind of loft. They met each other while Paco was acting as a male prostitute, doing a blowjob on a man (Guy Camilleri). Then, he discovers that Paco is a girl and became furious, trying later to rape her. Tonho saves her and invites her to live with him.

== Cast ==
- Roberto Bomtempo as Tonho
- Débora Falabella as Paco
- David Herman as Moe
- Guy Camilleri
- Richard Velazquez
- Theodoris Castellanos
- John Gilleece
- Daniel Porto

== Production ==
Talking about the scene in which she appears completely naked with a gun pointed in her direction, Débora Falabella said, "What made it easier in that scene was the fact that I had to feel afraid and fragile. So being naked helped me in that composition. But of course the scene is uncomfortable, I'm not as comfortable naked as if I were dressed."

== Awards and nominations ==
Festival de Brasília

- Candango Trophy of Best Actress to Débora Falabella
- Candango Trophy of Best Director to José Joffily
- Candango Trophy of Best Screenplay to Paulo Halm

Grande Prêmio de Cinema Brasileiro

- Best Actress to Débora Falabella
- Nomination of Best Editing to Eduardo Escorel
- Nomination of Best Adapted Screenplay to Paulo Halm

Gramado Film Festival

- Golden Kikito of Best Editing to Eduardo Escorel
- Golden Kikito of Best Music to David Tygel
- Nomination of Golden Kikito for Best Film

Prêmio ACIE de Cinema

- Best Actress to Débora Falabella

Recife Cine PE Audiovisual Festival

- Calunga Trophy of Best Cinematography to Nonato Esterla
