= Here the Whole Time =

2025 film by Daniel Lieff

- Theatrical release poster
- Italian: Quinze Dias
- Directed by: Daniel Lieff
- Screenplay by: Ray Tavares; Vitor Brandt
- Based on: Quinze Dias by Vitor Martins
- Produced by: Juliana Capelini; Renata Brandão
- Starring: Miguel Lallo; Diego Lira; Débora Falabella; Mika Soeiro; Bel Moreira; Mariana Santos; Olívia Araújo; Márcio Vito; João Pedro Chaseliov
- Cinematography: Daniel Primo
- Edited by: Eduardo Hartung
- Music by: Érico Theobaldo; Remi Chatain
- Production company: Conspiração Filmes
- Distributed by: Manequim Filmes
- Release dates: 7 December 2025 (CCXP); 18 June 2026 (Brazil)
- Running time: 100 minutes
- Country: Brazil
- Language: Portuguese

Here the Whole Time (Portuguese: Quinze Dias, lit. 'Fifteen Days') is a 2025 Brazilian coming-of-age romantic comedy-drama film directed by Daniel Lieff, based on the 2017 novel of the same name by Vitor Martins. The film stars Miguel Lallo, Diego Lira, Débora Falabella, Mika Soeiro, Bel Moreira, Mariana Santos, Olívia Araújo, Márcio Vito, and João Pedro Chaseliov.

The film premiered at CCXP on 7 December 2025. It was released theatrically in Brazil on 18 June 2026 by Manequim Filmes.

== Plot ==
Felipe is a gay teenager dealing with body image issues and bullying at school. For him, the July break cannot come soon enough. However, his mother informs him that their neighbour Caio, who happens to be Felipe's longtime secret crush, will be staying at their place for fifteen days while his parents are away.

When the bullying intensified in their childhood, Felipe retreated from the swimming pool and he and Caio have been distant since. He is adherently opposed to Caio staying over, privately convinced that he is straight, but his efforts to convince his mother, Rita, to not let him stay is futile. Sensing the tension, Caio decides to sleep on the couch.

In the first few days, Felipe and Caio constantly butt heads, which escalates when Felipe tried to get his towel back, sending them tumbling into the pool along with the paint Felipe picked up for his mother, forcing the pool to temporarily close. As punishment, Rita tasks them both to go the supermarket to get groceries for her. While there, Felipe encounters a duo of bullies, who despite standing up to them, he is unable to shake them until Caio intervenes to scare them off. On the way home, Felipe explains how he has gotten used to bullying, to which Caio sympathizes with.

That evening as his mother goes out on a date, Felipe and Caio watch television and he introduces Caio to fortune cookie messages which he and Rita use to determine what his grandmother would have said, watching over them. Rita later returns from an unsuccessful date, sitting down with them to continue watching television. As they head to bed for the night, Felipe opens up for Caio to stand with him brushing their teeth, their arms slightly touching each other.

Rita takes them to dance class the next day. Felipe helps Caio with the right steps, but stops short in his tracks. He later fends off bullies who pick on Dudu, an obese kid. Caio arrives as Felipe gives Dudu advice, which he finds terrible, and instead takes them both to play a handball match against the bullies, which they easily win.

== Cast ==
- Miguel Lallo as Felipe
- Diego Lira as Caio
- Débora Falabella as Rita, Felipe's mother
- Mika Soeiro as Beca, a friend of Caio
- Bel Moreira as Melissa, Beka's girlfriend
- Mariana Santos as Olívia Miranda Tavares, Felipe's therapist
- Olívia Araújo as Sandra, Caio's mother
- Márcio Vito as Mauro, Caio's father
- João Pedro Chaseliov as Francisco, the residence security guard
- Fernando Caruso
- Augusto Madeira
- Silvio Guindane
- João Gabriel Marinho as Bruno, one of Felipe's bullies
- Victor Galisteu as Jorge, one of Felipe's bullies

== Production ==
In November 2020, it was announced that Conspiração Filmes had acquired the rights to a film adaptation of Brazilian author Vitor Martins's debut novel Here the Whole Time (2017). In April 2024, Conspiração Filmes announced an open casting call for actors aged 15 to 21 for the lead roles.

The film was directed by Daniel Lieff from a screenplay by Ray Tavares and Vitor Brandt. The cast—including Miguel Lallo, Diego Lira, and Débora Falabella—was confirmed in May 2025. That same month, filming began in Rio de Janeiro and Cataguases, Minas Gerais.

== Release ==
Quinze Dias premiered as part of Vitrine Filmes' lineup at CCXP in São Paulo on 7 December 2025. The film was released theatrically in Brazil on 18 June 2026 by Manequim Filmes. It was released globally on Netflix on 19 August 2026.
