= Paulo Moura - Alma Brasileira =

2013 film directed by Eduardo Escorel

- Directed by: Eduardo Escorel
- Starring: Paulo Moura
- Distributed by: Espaço Filmes
- Release dates: April 4, 2013 (É Tudo Verdade Festival); May 3, 2013 (Brazil)
- Running time: 86 minutes
- Country: Brazil
- Language: Portuguese

Paulo Moura - Alma Brasileira is a 2013 Brazilian documentary film directed by Eduardo Escorel about the clarinetist and saxophonist Paulo Moura.

The documentary is based on over 40 years of videos and written records. It features 25 songs from the artist repertoire, while Paulo Moura himself gives more details about his musical life and the Brazilian music scene.
