= Débora Falabella =

Brazilian actress (born 1979)

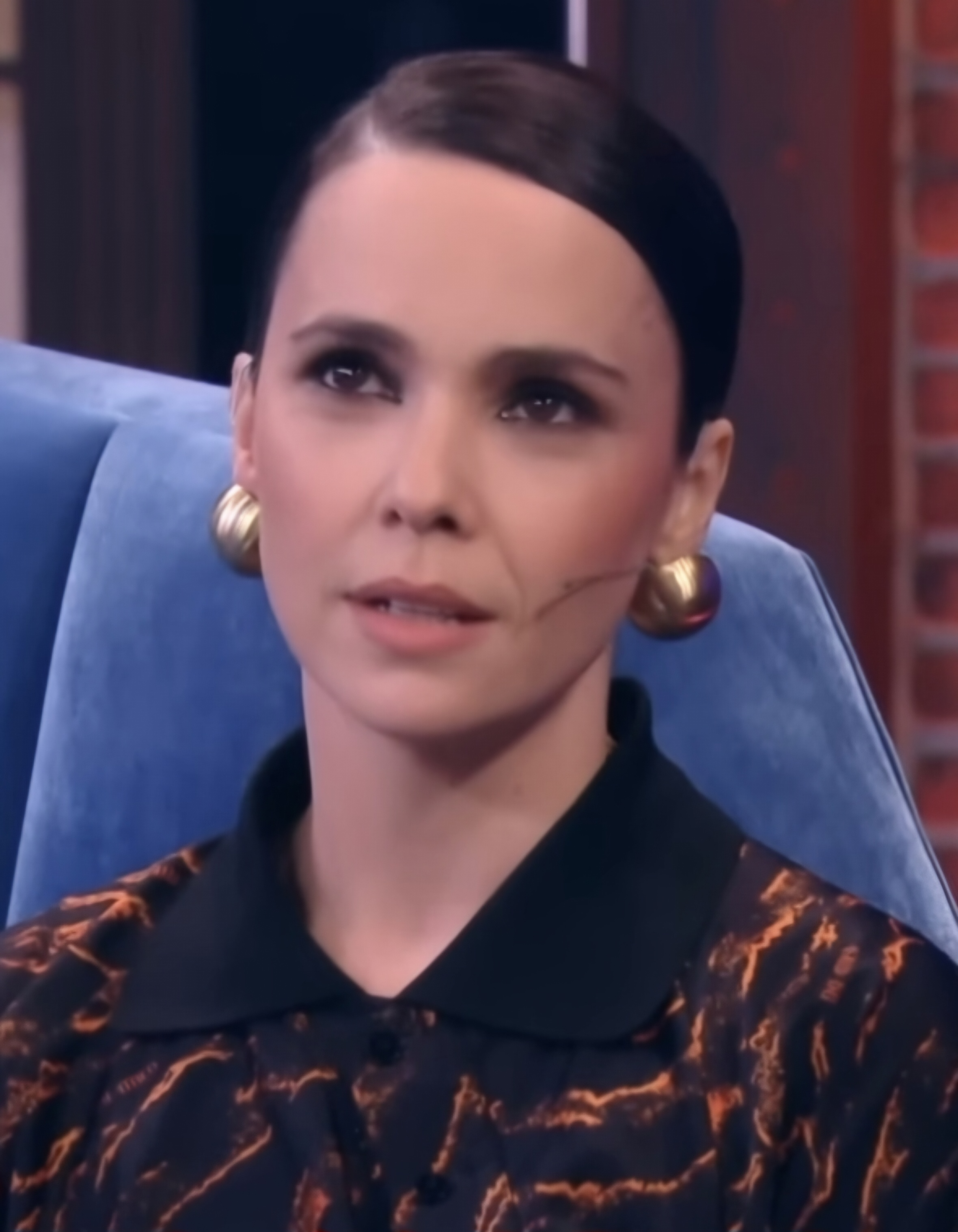
- Falabella in 2024
- Born: 22 February 1979 (age 47); Belo Horizonte, Minas Gerais, Brazil
- Occupation: Actress
- Years active: 1995–present
- Spouse: Fernando Fraiha (m. 2022)
- Children: 1
- Relatives: Cynthia Falabella (sister)

Débora Lima Falabella (Brazilian Portuguese: [ˈdɛbuɾɐ ˈlimɐ falaˈbɛlɐ]; born 22 February 1979) is a Brazilian actress.

== Early years ==
Falabella was born in Belo Horizonte, the daughter of actor Rogério Falabella and the lyrical singer Maria Olympia.

During her childhood she became interested in acting and began to participate in plays. At fifteen she starred in her first professional play, Flicts, written by Ziraldo.

Falabella continued acting in dramas. In her teens, she was one of the protagonists of the young adult telenovela Chiquititas. She lived for a time in Argentina, where the series was filmed.

== Career ==
Falabella studied advertising in college but abandoned her studies after receiving acting offers. In a casting for actors, she got her entrance into the Brazilian television network, Rede Globo, in one of the seasons of the young adult series Malhação in 1998.

After that she returned to her hometown to continue her work in theater, and eventually made a small role in the 1999 miniseries Mulher.

In 2001, Falabella made her telenovela debut on Rede Globo in Um Anjo Caiu do Céu. Her performance led her to join the main cast of O Clone, which earned her the award for Best Actress in Domingão do Faustão.

Falabella also appeared in films such as Françoise, for which she was awarded Best Actress at the Festivals of Gramado and Brasilia, and received an honorable mention at the BR River Festival 2001. She later starred in Dois Perdidos numa Noite Suja, a 2002 film directed by José Joffily, for which she won awards for best actress in Brazil and a cinema Candango Trophy. Her subsequent film roles included Lisbela e o Prisioneiro (2003), Cazuza (2004) with Daniel de Oliveira, and the romantic comedy A Dona da História (2004) alongside Rodrigo Santoro, directed by Daniel Filho.

In the miniseries JK she played the role of Sarah Kubitschek, wife of Brazilian president Juscelino Kubitschek. In 2006, she was cast in the lead role of the Emmy-nominated telenovela Sinhá Moça. In 2007, director Daniel Filho cast her in the film Primo Basílio.

In 2011, she played Clarisse, one of the main characters in the Emmy-winning series, The Invisible Woman, and starred again with actor Rodrigo Santoro, in the films My Country and Homens do Bem.

In 2012, Falabella returned to telenovelas, starring in the successful television production, Avenida Brasil receiving several nominations for Best Lead Actress. In 2014, she portrayed Ray, the girlfriend of a serial killer, in the series Dupla Identidade, created by Glória Perez.

== Personal life ==
Falabella has a sister, the actress Cynthia Falabella. In 2005, she married Eduardo Hipolitho (better known as Chuck), the vocalist of the band Forgotten Boys. They have a daughter, Nina. They separated in 2010.

== Filmography ==
=== Television ===
Television
Year	Title	Role	Notes
1998	Malhação	Antônia	
1999	Mulher	Aninha	Cameo
2000	Chiquititas Brasil	Estrela	
2001	Um Anjo Caiu do Céu	Cuca de Montaltino Medeiros	
2001	O Clone	Mel Ferraz	
2003	Agora É que São Elas	Léo (Leonarda Mendes Galvão)	
2003	Casseta & Planeta, Urgente!	Herself	Cameo
2004	Um Só Coração	Rachel Rosenberg	
2004	Senhora do Destino	Duda (Maria Eduarda de Andrade e Couto Ferreira da Silva)	
2006	JK	Sarah Lemos Kubitschek	
2006	Sinhá Moça	Sinhá Moça (Maria das Graças Ferreira)	
2006	Sitcom.br		Cameo
2007	Duas Caras	Julia de Queiroz Barreto	
2009	Som & Fúria	Sarah	
2010	Escrito nas Estrelas	Beatriz Cristina Tavares de Miranda	
2011	Ti Ti Ti	Isabel Campos Dimery	Cameo
2011	A Mulher Invisível	Clarisse	
2011	Homens de Bem	Mary	
2012	Avenida Brasil	Nina García Hernández (Rita Fonseca de Souza)	
2014	Dupla Identidade	Ray	
2015	As Canalhas	Julieta	Episode: "Julieta"
2016	Nada Será Como Antes	Verônica Maia	
2017	A Força do Querer	Irene Steiner / Solange Lima	
2018	Se Eu Fechar os Olhos Agora	Isabel Marques Torres	
2019	Vítimas Digitais	Renata Guimarães	
2019-2021	Aruanas	Natalie Lima Melo	
2023	Terra e Paixão	Lucinda do Carmo Amorim	
2023	Fim	Irene	

=== Feature films ===
Film
Year	Title	Role	Notes
2001	Françoise	Françoise	Short film
2002	Dois Perdidos numa Noite Suja	Paco / Rita	
2003	Lisbela e o Prisioneiro	Lisbela	
2003	Looney Tunes: Back in Action	Kate	Brazilian voice dubbing
2004	Cazuza - O Tempo Não Pára	Denise Dumont "Dani"	
2004	A Dona da História	Young Carolina	
2006	5 Mentiras	Chucky	Short film
2007	Primo Basílio	Luísa	
2008	La Dolorosa	Miranda	Short film
2008	Quarto 38	Simone	Short film
2009	Doce Amargo	Moira / Moema	
2011	Meu País	Manuela	
2011	Homens de Bem	Mary	
2013	Dois Macacos Mais Um	Débora	
2016	O Filho Eterno	Cláudia	
2018	O Beijo no Asfalto	Selminha	
2018	Todo o Clichê de Amor	Hellen	
2021	Depois a Louca Sou Eu	Dani Teixeira	
2022	Bem-Vinda, Violeta	Ana	
2025	Chico Bento e a Goiabeira Maraviósa	Teacher Marocas	
2026	Quinze Dias	Rita	

=== Theater ===
Theater
Year	Work	Written and directed
1995	Flicts	Ziraldo
2004	Noites Brancas	de Yara de Novaes
2006	A Serpente	de Yara de Novaes
2007	O Continente Negro	de Aderbal Freire Filho
2010	O Amor e Outros Estranhos Rumores	de Yara de Novaes
2013	Contrações	de Grace Passô (Emma)
2015	Mantenha Fora do Alcance do Bebê	de Eric Lenate
2017	Love, Love, Love	de Eric Lanete

== Awards and nominations ==
- Best Actress, Premiere Brazil Festival, for Françoise (2001)
- Best Actress in Short Film, Golden Kikito, for Françoise (2001)
- Best Actress in a Short Film, Candango Trophy, for Françoise (2001)
- Newcomer of the Year, Domingão do Faustão, for The Clone (2001)
- Best Actress, Candango Trophy, for Dois Perdidos numa Noite Suja (2002)
- Best Actress, Grande Prêmio do Cinema Brasileiro, for Dois Perdidos numa Noite Suja (2002)
- Best Actress, Prêmio ACIE de Cinema, for Dois Perdidos numa Noite Suja (2004)
- Nominated for Best Romantic Couple, for Agora São Elas (2003)
- Nominated for Best Actress, Contigo! Award, for Senhora do Destino (2004)
- Nominated for Best Actress, Contigo! Award, for Duas Caras (2007)
- Nominated for Best Romantic Couple, Contigo! Award, for Duas Caras (2007)
- Nominated for Favorite Actress, Meus Prêmios Nick, for Avenida Brasil (2012)
- Nominated for Best Actress in a Telenovela, Melhores do Ano (TV Globo), for Avenida Brasil (2013)
- Nominated for Outstanding Lead Actress, TV Contigo Award, for Avenida Brasil (2013)
