= Marina Person =

Brazilian actress (born 1969)

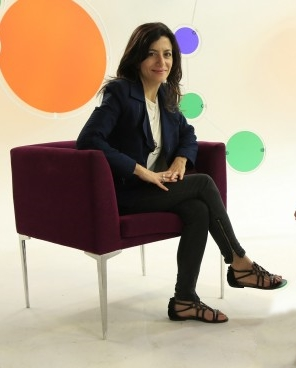
- Marina Person
- Born: Marina Izaura Gerard Person; 15 February 1969 (age 57); São Paulo, SP, Brazil
- Known for: Actress, VJ for MTV Brasil

Marina Person (born 15 February 1969) is a Brazilian actress, filmmaker and former MTV VJ. She hosts the TV shows Top Top MTV, with Leo Madeira, and MTV+.

In 2007, Marina Person released the documentary Person about the life of her father, the also filmmaker Luis Sérgio Person.
