= Irenita Duarte =

Brazilian actress

Irenita Duarte is a Brazilian actress. Her acting roles on Brazilian television include the soap operas Quem Casa com Maria (1964), Simplesmente Maria (1970-1971), and Um Sol Maior (1977).
