= 1903 in Brazilian football =

Football in Brazil
- Season: 1903

The 1903 season was the second season of competitive football in Brazil.

== Campeonato Paulista ==
First Stage

Teams advanced to the final

Position	Team	Points	Played	Won	Drawn	Lost	For	Against	Difference
1	São Paulo Athletic	13	8	6	1	1	21	5	16
2	Paulistano	13	8	6	1	1	14	4	10
3	Mackenzie	7	8	3	1	4	10	8	2
4	SC Internacional de São Paulo	4	8	2	0	6	8	27	−19
5	Germânia	3	8	1	1	6	8	17	−9

Final

October 25, 1903

São Paulo Athletic	2–1	Paulistano

São Paulo Athletic declared as the Campeonato Paulista champions.
