= Men and Women (1964 film) =

1964 film by Walter Hugo Khouri

- Theatrical release poster
- Portuguese: Noite Vazia
- Directed by: Walter Hugo Khouri
- Written by: Walter Hugo Khouri
- Produced by: Nelson Gaspari; Walter Hugo Khouri
- Starring: Norma Bengell; Odete Lara; Mário Benvenutti; Gabriele Tinti
- Cinematography: Rudolf Icsey
- Edited by: Mauro Alice
- Music by: Rogério Duprat
- Production companies: Kamera Filmes; Vera Cruz Filmes
- Distributed by: Cinedistri; Embrafilme
- Release date: 28 September 1964 (Brazil)
- Running time: 93 minutes
- Country: Brazil
- Language: Portuguese

Men and Women (Portuguese: Noite Vazia, lit. 'Empty Night') is a 1964 Brazilian drama film written and directed by Walter Hugo Khouri, with a soundtrack by Rogério Duprat executed by Zimbo Trio.

In November 2015 the film entered the list made by the Brazilian Association of Film Critics (Abraccine) of the 100 best Brazilian films of all time. It was entered into the 1965 Cannes Film Festival.

== Plot ==
In São Paulo, two friends (one married and from a wealthy family) take two prostitutes for a night of different pleasures. The experience turns out to be frustrating for all concerned, with the four spending the time talking about themselves and the bitterness and emptiness of their lives.

== Cast ==
- Norma Bengell as Mara
- Odete Lara as Regina
- Mário Benvenutti as Luisinho
- Gabriele Tinti as Nelson
- Lisa Negri as Nelson's lover
- Marisa Woodward
- Anita Kennedy
- Ricardo Rivas
- Célia Watanabe as Japanese waitress
- Wilfred Khouri as Luis's son
