= Joanídia Sodré =

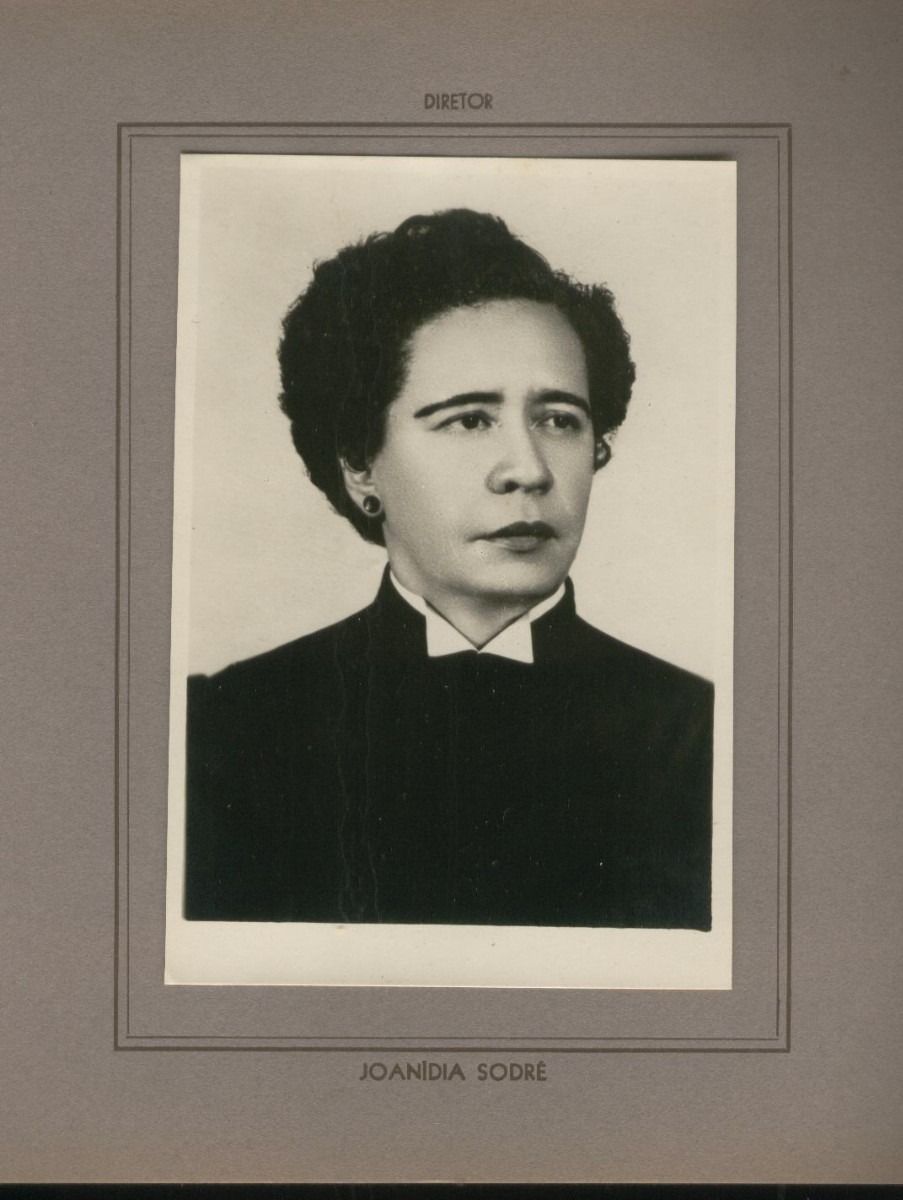
Joanídia Núñez Sodré

Joanídia Núñez Sodré (22 December 1903 – 1975) was a Brazilian music educator, pianist, conductor and composer.

== Biography ==
Joanídia Sodré was born in Porto Alegre. When she was four years old, her family moved to Rio de Janeiro where she studied piano with Alberto Nepomuceno. Later she graduated from the National Institute of Music, where she studied music with Henrique Oswald, Agnello França and Francisco Braga.

After completing her studies at age 22, she became professor of harmony of the National Institute of Music. In 1927 she received a grant to study at the National Conservatory in Berlin. On returning to Brazil, she founded the Youth Orchestra and became one of the first conductors to lead the Brazilian Orquestra da Sociedade de Concertos Sinfônicos. She became the first woman director of the National School of Music (Music School of the Federal University) in 1946 where she served until 1967. She was also vice-chancellor of the University of Brazil and dean for almost a year. She died in Rio de Janeiro. She served as director of the School of Music of the Federal University of Rio de Janeiro.

== Works ==
Selected works include:

- Casa Forte, opera
- Trio
- String Quartet
- String Quartet
