= Roberta Close =

Brazilian fashion model

- Born: Roberta Gambine Moreira; December 7, 1964 (age 61); Rio de Janeiro, Brazil
- Occupations: Model; actress

Roberta Gambine Moreira (born 7 December 1964) is a Brazilian fashion model, actress and television personality. She is constantly mentioned in the media as one of the greatest Brazilian icons and one of the main sex symbols in the country between the 1980s and 1990s, in addition to being a pioneer of transfeminism in her native country.

== Biography ==
After debuting as a star at Carnaval in 1980, Close gained notoriety as the main character of the clip for the song Dá Um Close Nela, by Erasmo Carlos, in 1984. In the video, which achieved great commercial success after the release on Fantástico, she plays a transvestite who attracts male gazes as she walks through the streets of Rio de Janeiro. The same year, she became the first transgender model to appear in Playboy magazine, in a record-selling issue upon launch. Later, Roberta Close has appeared on the catwalk for numerous fashion houses, including Thierry Mugler, Guy Laroche, Jean Paul Gaultier. She also been featured in editorials for Vogue and wrote a memoir called Muito Prazer, Roberta Close (1997).

== Filmography ==
- 1984: Big Close - TV Series; talk-show host
- 1987: Uma Vez por Semana - stage play; actress
- 1987: No Rio Vale Tudo - movie; actress
- 1990: O Escorpião Escarlate - movie; actress
- 1997: Mandacaru - TV Series; actress
- 1999: O Lobo da Madrugada - stage play; actress
- 1999: Performance - stage play; actress
- 2000: Zorra Total - TV Series; actress
- 2000: De Noite na Cama - TV Series; talk-show host
- 2002: Kinky Gerlinky - movie; documentary character

== Personal life ==
In 1993, Close married Roland Granacher. The wedding to her Swiss husband took place in Europe, as it would not have been legal in Brazil. She lives with Granacher in Zurich and Paris. In May 2015, Close told Brazilian television host Gugu Liberato that she recently underwent genetic testing that revealed she is intersex. She was issued a new birth certificate by the Office of Public Records of the 4th district of Rio de Janeiro, which states that on December 7, 1964, a child of the female sex was born and was given the name "Roberta Gambine Moreira".
