= The Amorous Ones =

1968 film

- Theatrical release poster
- Directed by: Walter Hugo Khouri
- Written by: Walter Hugo Khouri
- Produced by: Walter Hugo Khouri
- Starring: Paulo José; Jacqueline Myrna; Lilian Lemmertz; Anecy Rocha
- Cinematography: Pio Zamuner
- Edited by: Maria Guadalupe Landini
- Music by: Rogério Duprat
- Production companies: Kamera Filmes; Columbia Pictures
- Distributed by: Columbia Pictures
- Release date: 23 September 1968
- Running time: 100 minutes
- Country: Brazil
- Language: Portuguese

The Amorous Ones (Portuguese: As Amorosas) is a 1968 Brazilian drama film written and directed by Walter Hugo Khouri. The film was selected as the Brazilian entry for the Best Foreign Language Film at the 41st Academy Awards, but was not accepted as a nominee. The film was also entered into the 1969 Melbourne International Film Festival.

== Plot ==
A young university student lives in a permanent state of perplexity and emotional indecision, which is reflected in all his attitudes and positions taken on life. Of bourgeois fomentation, he lives almost in poverty, living at his friends' house and arranging money for small services and loans obtained from his sister.

== Cast ==
- Paulo José as Marcelo
- Jacqueline Myrna as Marta
- Lilian Lemmertz as Lena
- Anecy Rocha as Ana
- Stênio Garcia
- Newton Prado
- Inês Knaut
- Ana Maria Scavazza
- Flávio Porto
- Abrahão Farc

== See also ==
- List of submissions to the 41st Academy Awards for Best Foreign Language Film
- List of Brazilian submissions for the Academy Award for Best Foreign Language Film
