= Aruanda =

Utopian location in Brazilian religions

Aruanda or Aluanda is a concept present in Afro-Brazilian religions, especially in Umbanda, as well as in Brazilian Spiritism. It describes a place in the spirit world, which varies greatly according to the religious current, but which could generally be equated with a kind of spiritual colony.

It is often understood as a spiritual citadel that would orbit the ionosphere of planet Earth.

== Meanings ==
Despite the abundant literature, Umbanda is not considered a codified religion. For this reason, the term Aruanda may have several meanings, depending on the terreiro, or spiritualist center in which it is mentioned. It is even used by other spiritualistic religions such as Quimbanda and Candomblé, in generic reference to "spiritual plane", the place where the higher "guides" would live.

For the traditional Umbanda, founded in 1908 by the Caboclo das Sete Encruzilhadas, the inhabitants of Aruanda are working spirits of goodness and charity, newly disembodied in learning, and light spirits who have not been returning to the physical realm for a long time. These spiritual guides, despite their spiritual evolution, remain in the vibrating dimension of Aruanda to continue assisting the incarnate and discarnate, manifesting on Earth under the fluidic clothing (in spiritual typology) of old blacks, caboclos and children. Its true forms, however, transcend race, creed, or ethnicity, and their manifestation is possible in any congregation that practices the love-charity binomial and admits spiritual communication.

For Spiritism (codified by Allan Kardec), Aruanda would be the denomination of a spiritual colony, similar to the Nosso Lar colony, described in the book Nosso Lar (Our Home), by André Luiz (spirit), psychographed by the Brazilian medium Chico Xavier. In Aruanda, however, magical elements of African culture would be present, in syncretism with symbolisms of Judeo-Christian culture.
