= Rogério Sganzerla =

Filmmaker

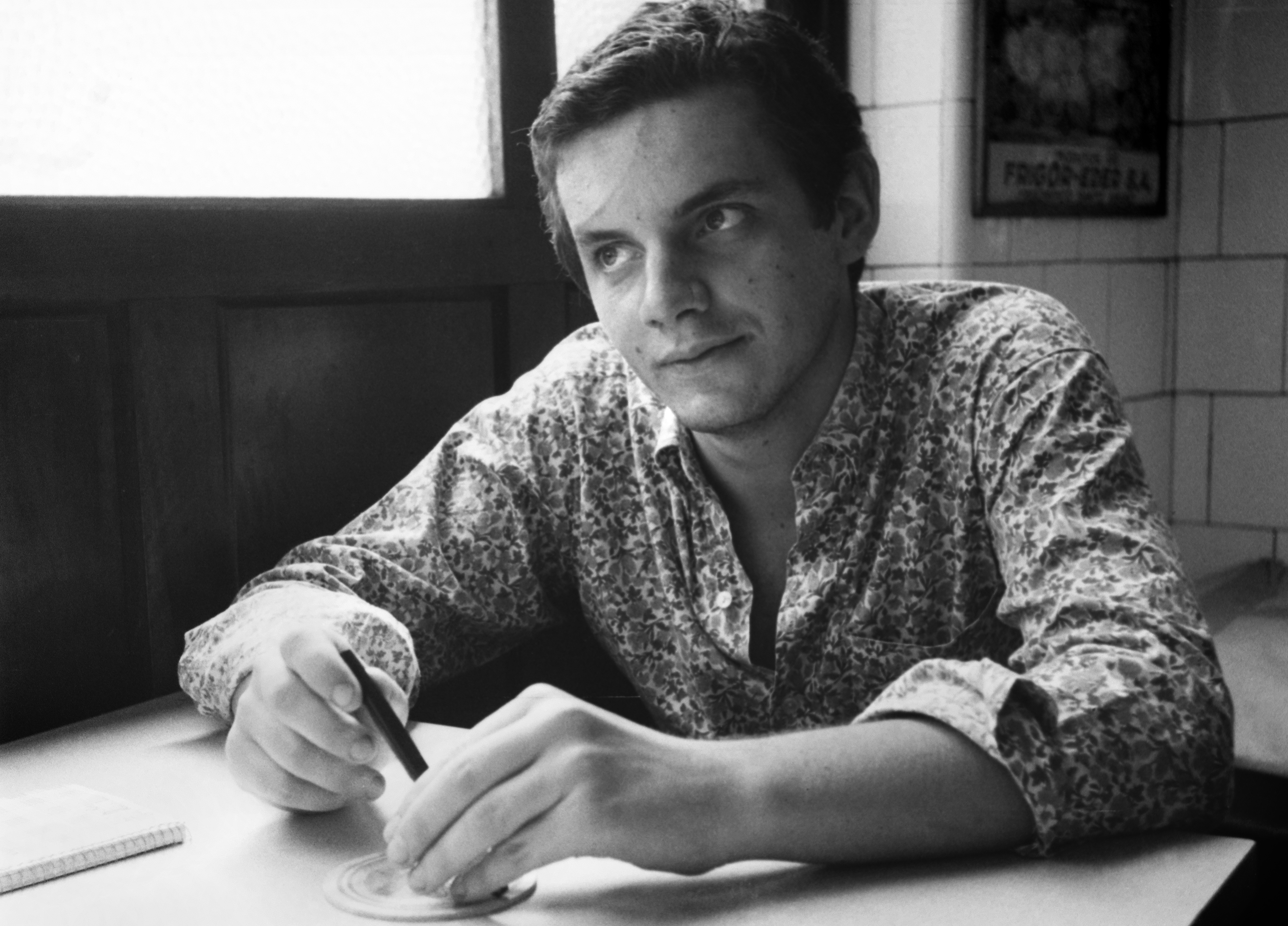
- Born: May 4, 1946; Joaçaba, Santa Catarina, Brazil
- Died: January 9, 2004 (aged 57); São Paulo, Brazil
- Occupation: filmmaker
- Years active: 1966-2003
- Notable work: The Red Light Bandit
- Style: Cinema marginal
- Spouse: Helena Ignez

Rogério Sganzerla (4 May 1946 — 9 January 2004) was a Brazilian filmmaker. One of the main names of the cinema marginal underground movement, his most known work is The Red Light Bandit (1968). Sganzerla was influenced by Orson Welles, Jean-Luc Godard, and José Mojica Marins, and often used clichés from film noir and pornochanchadas. Irony, narrative subversion and collage were trademarks of his film aesthetics.

== Biography ==
Sganzerla was born in Joaçaba, in the state of Santa Catarina. During the 1960 decade, he wrote for the newspaper O Estado de S. Paulo as film reporter. In 1967, Sganzerla directed his first short film, Documentário. In 1968 he directed his first feature film, O Bandido da Luz Vermelha (The Red Light Bandit)

In 1970, he founded the Bel-Air film company, together with Júlio Bressane. Headed by Sganzerla, the company produced the films Copacabana Mon Amour and Sem essa, aranha (1970). In 1985, Sganzerla directed the docufiction Nem Tudo É Verdade (It's Not All True) about Orson Welles' arrival to Brazil to film his unfinished documentary It's All True.

Sganzerla died in 2004, of a brain tumor, shortly after finishing his last film O signo do caos.

== Filmography ==
Key
†	Indicates a documentary	‡	Indicates a short film

List of films directed by Rogério Sganzerla
Year	Original title	English release title	Language(s)	Notes
1966	Documentário ^{‡}		Portuguese	
1968	O Bandido da Luz Vermelha	The Red Light Bandit	Portuguese	
1969	A Mulher de Todos	The Woman of Everyone	Portuguese	
1969	HQ ^{†}		Portuguese	Co-directed with Álvaro de Moya. Short documentary on the evolution of comic books since The Yellow Kid until Spirit.
1969	Quadrinhos no Brasil ^{†}		Portuguese	Short documentary on comic books in Brazil.
1970	Carnaval na Lama		Portuguese	
1970	Sem Essa, Aranha		Portuguese	
1970	Copacabana Mon Amour		Portuguese	
1971	Fora do Baralho ^{†}		Portuguese	
1977	Viagem e Descrição do Rio Guanabara por Ocasião da França Antártica ^{‡}		Portuguese	
1978	Mudança de Hendrix ^{†}		Portuguese	Short documentary on Jimi Hendrix. Filming began in 1971.
1980	Abismu	The Abyss	Portuguese	Also known as O Abismo. Produced in 1977.
1981	Noel por Noel ^{‡}		Portuguese	Short homage to Noel Rosa.
1981	Brasil ^{†}		Portuguese	Short documentation of Gilberto Gil, Caetano Veloso, Maria Bethânia and João Gilberto during the recording of the collaborative album Brasil.
1981	A Cidade do Salvador (Petróleo Jorrou na Bahia) ^{†}		Portuguese	Short documentary on the economy growth after petroleum exploration in Salvador, Bahia.
1983	Irani ^{†}		Portuguese	Short documentary on parades commemorating the anniversary of the Guerra do Contestado in Irani, Santa Catarina.
1986	Nem Tudo É Verdade		Portuguese	
1986	Ritos Populares: Umbanda no Brasil ^{†}		Portuguese	Short documentary on Umbanda in Brazil.
1990	Isto é Noel Rosa ^{†}		Portuguese	Medium-length documentary on Noel Rosa.
1990	A Linguagem de Orson Welles ^{†}	Welles' Language	Portuguese	Short documentary on Orson Welles' stay in Brazil during production of It's All True.
1990	Anônimo e Incomum ^{†}		Portuguese	Short documentary on plastic artist Antônio Manuel.
1992	Perigo Negro ^{‡}		Portuguese	Based on Marco Zero by Oswald de Andrade. Segment of Oswaldianas (1992).
1992	América: O Grande Acerto de Vespúcio ^{‡}		Portuguese	Theatrical monologue based on Amerigo Vespucci's "novus mundus" letter.
1997	Tudo É Brasil ^{†}	All Is Brazil	Portuguese	A film essay about Brazil discovered through Orson Welles eyes during the shooting of It's All True.
2001	B2 ^{†}		Portuguese	Co-directed with Sylvio Renoldi. Short documentary made up of unused footage from The Red Light Bandit and Carnaval na Lama.
2003	Informação: H. J. Koellreutter ^{†}		Portuguese	Short documentary on Hans-Joachim Koellreutter.
2005	O Signo do Caos	The Sign of Chaos	Portuguese	Also known as "O Anti Filme". Produced in 2003.
