= The Red Light Bandit =

- Original Brazilian release poster
- Directed by: Rogério Sganzerla
- Written by: Rogério Sganzerla
- Produced by: José da Costa Cordeiro; José Alberto Reis; Rogério Sganzerla
- Starring: Paulo Villaça; Helena Ignez; Luiz Linhares
- Narrated by: Hélio Aguiar
- Cinematography: Peter Overbeck
- Edited by: Silvio Renoldi
- Music by: Rogério Sganzerla
- Production company: Urano Filmes
- Distributed by: Sagres Filmes (VHS release)
- Release date: 2 December 1968 (São Paulo)
- Running time: 92 minutes
- Country: Brazil
- Language: Portuguese

The Red Light Bandit (Portuguese: O Bandido da Luz Vermelha) is a 1968 Brazilian crime film directed by Rogério Sganzerla, inspired by the crimes of the famous real-life robber João Acácio Pereira da Costa, nicknamed the "Red Light Bandit" (Bandido da Luz Vermelha). The film is regarded as a classic work of Cinema Marginal, the Brazilian underground filmmaking movement of the 1960s. Sganzerla was about 22 years old when he directed it.

Sganzerla called the film a Third World western.

== Plot ==
Born and raised in the Brazilian slums, Jorge is a burglar of luxury houses in São Paulo. He baffles the police with his unusual modus operandi, and is nicknamed is "The Red Light Bandit" by the sensationalist press. Wearing a red flashlight he breaks into houses at night, rapes his female victims and has long irreverent conversations with them, makes daring escapes, and then spends the profits of his crimes extravagantly in the decadent Boca do Lixo district. His criminal exploits are shown in a fragmented manner, voiced over by two narrators in the style of a sensationalistic radio program.

He has an affair with Janete Jane, he meets with other burglars and a corrupt politician, and gets betrayed. Pursued and cornered, he has only one way out of his career of crime: suicide.

== Cast ==
- Paulo Villaça as Jorge, the Red Light Bandit
- Helena Ignez as Janete Jane
- Luiz Linhares as police officer Cabeção
- Pagano Sobrinho as J.B. da Silva
- Roberto Luna as Lucho Gatica
- José Marinho as Tarzan
- Ezequiel Neves as Reporter
- Sérgio Mamberti as Homosexual
- Renato Consorte as TV host
- Sérgio Hingst as Millionaire
- Lola Brah as Rich Woman
- Antonio Lima as Gangster
- Ozualdo Candeias as Criminal
- Maurice Capovilla as Gangster
- Carlos Reichenbach as Gangster
- Sônia Braga as Victim

== Reception ==
Film critic Ismail Xavier stated that the film treats the criminal's social milieu with irony, making use of collage, intertextuality and pastiche, in contrast with Cinema Novo's naturalistic filmmaking.

In 2015, The Red Light Bandit was chosen by Abraccine, the Brazilian Association of Film Critics, as the sixth best Brazilian film of all time. It was listed by Jeanne O Santos, from Cinema em Cena (Cinema Scene), as a "national classic".

=== Awards and nominations ===
1968 Festival de Brasília (Brazil)

- Best Costume
- Best Director
- Best Editing
- Best Film

== Sequel ==
A sequel directed by Ícaro Martins and Helena Ignez, widow of Sganzerla, was released in 2010: Luz nas Trevas - A Volta do Bandido da Luz Vermelha.
