= Vera Campos =

Brazilian actress

Vera Campos is a Brazilian actress. Among her acting roles on Brazilian television are the soap operas Quem Casa com Maria? (1964), O Direito de Nascer (1964) and Viúvas Eróticas (1982).
