= São Paulo, Incorporated =

1965 film

- Theatrical release poster
- Portuguese: São Paulo, Sociedade Anônima
- Directed by: Luis Sérgio Person
- Written by: Luis Sérgio Person
- Produced by: Renato Magalhães Gouveia
- Starring: Walmor Chagas; Darlene Glória; Ana Esmeralda; Eva Wilma
- Cinematography: Ricardo Aronovich
- Edited by: Glauco Mirko Laurelli
- Music by: Cláudio Petraglia; Francisco Alves; David Nasser
- Production company: Socine
- Distributed by: Columbia Pictures
- Release date: 1965
- Running time: 107 minutes
- Country: Brazil
- Language: Portuguese

São Paulo, Incorporated (Portuguese: São Paulo, Sociedade Anônima) is a 1965 Brazilian drama film written and directed by Luis Sérgio Person. It follows Carlos (Walmor Chagas), a young middle-class São Paulo resident in an existential crisis.

The film was released shortly after the 1964 Brazilian coup d'état, and reflects on the Brazilian white middle-class struggles in the years leading into it. It is considered one of the greatest classics of Brazilian cinema.

It was selected as the Brazilian entry for the Best Foreign Language Film at the 38th Academy Awards, but was not nominated.

== Plot ==
The plot is set against the backdrop of development of the automotive industry in the late 1950s and early 1960s. Carlos, a young man from a middle-income background in São Paulo, has an existential crisis amidst the industrialization process.

== Cast ==
- Walmor Chagas as Carlos
- Darlene Glória as Ana
- Ana Esmeralda as Hilda
- Eva Wilma as Luciana
- Otelo Zeloni as Arturo

== Reception ==
Writing for the newspaper Jornal do Brasil, the critic Ely Azeredo said São Paulo Sociedade Anônima "for its author – ‘is above all an inquiry, an attempt to research the characteristics of a city whose contrasts and complexity of elements incline us towards a lack of definition, a permanent lack of choice. (...)Person even says that he intended "a diatribe against some of the mechanisms that make man, instead of a free being capable of choices, a cog in a machine whose promises and values he often doesn't even come to know."

In 2015 it was selected by Abraccine (Brazilian Association of Movie Critics) as the seventh-best Brazilian film of all time.

== Restoration ==
In 2025, a 4K restoration produced by the World Cinema Project was completed, being re-released in Brazilian theaters in 2026, commemorating the film's 60th anniversary.

== See also ==
- List of submissions to the 38th Academy Awards for Best Foreign Language Film
- List of Brazilian submissions for the Academy Award for Best Foreign Language Film
