= Isabel Ribeiro =

Portuguese robotics engineer (born 1955)

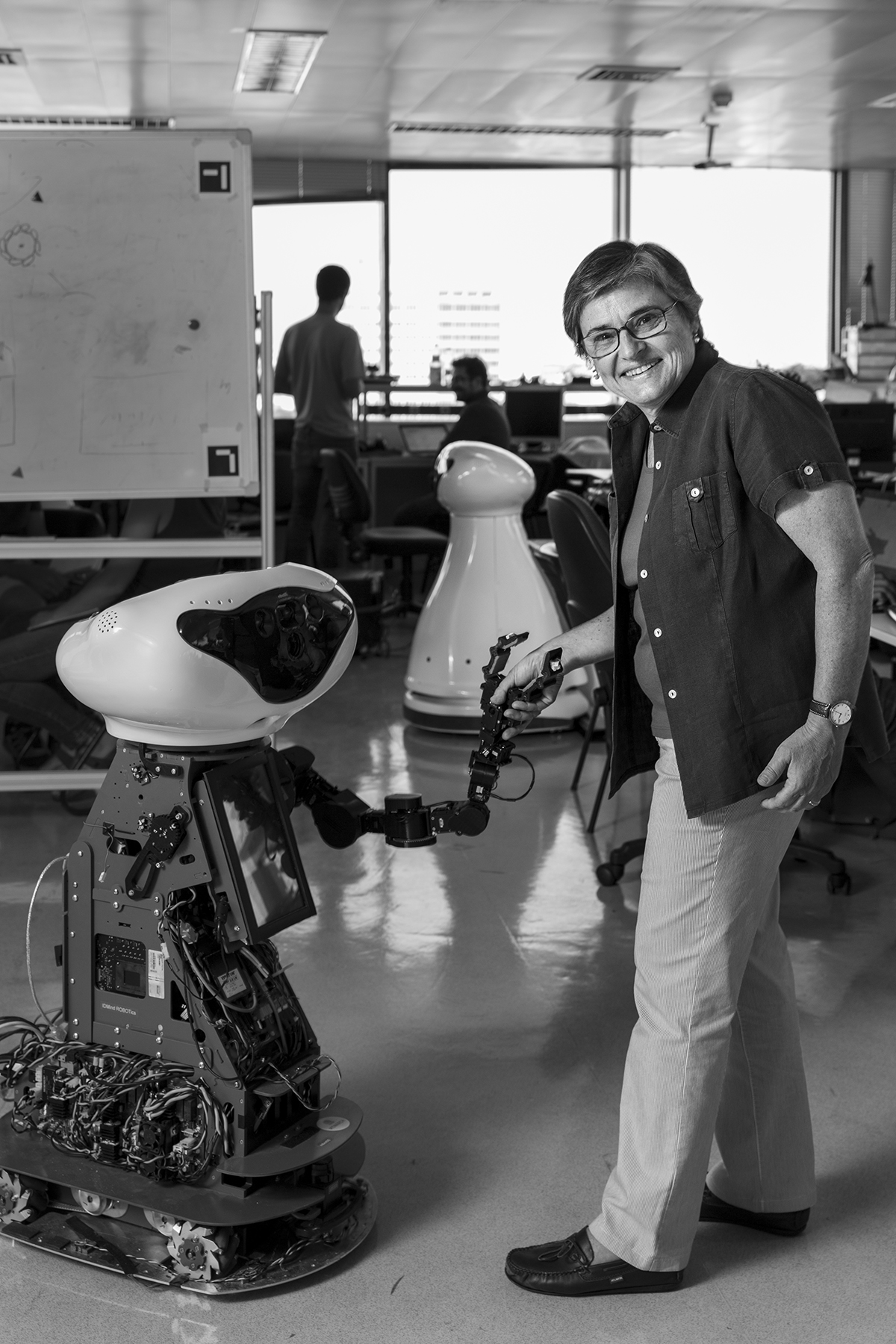
- Ribeiro in the robotics laboratory
- Born: 28 September 1955 (age 70)
- Other name: Maria Isabel Lobato de Faria Ribeiro
- Education: University of Lisbon; Technical University of Lisbon
- Occupations: Robotics engineer, professor
- Known for: Mobile robotics

Maria Isabel Lobato de Faria Ribeiro, widely known as Isabel Ribeiro, (born 1955), is a Portuguese robotics engineer. She retired from academia in December 2021 but remains a Full Professor and Distinguished Professor at the Instituto Superior Técnico in Lisbon. She is considered an expert in mobile robotics, which is "a scientific field that she pioneered in Portugal."

== Biography ==
In 1972, Ribeiro enrolled at the Instituto Superior Técnico (IST) at the University of Lisbon, where she earned her bachelor's degree with honors.

She remained at IST to work and study with Professor Fonseca de Moura. In December 1983, she became one of the first two women to complete a Master’s degree in electrical and computer engineering in Portugal. When her professor relocated to Carnegie Mellon University in Pittsburgh, Pennsylvania, Ribeiro followed him to continue her doctoral research. She graduated from the University of Lisbon with her doctorate in Electrical and Computer Engineering in 1988. She completed her habilitation (Agregação) in 2000, from the Technical University of Lisbon in Control and Robotics.

=== Career ===
Ribeiro's scientific interests have generally been directed to indoor and outdoor mobile robotics and the coordination of multiple robots, with concentrations on navigation, localization, mapping, trajectory planning and probabilistic methodologies.

She has worked on national and international research and development projects concerning robotics, such as remote handling for ITER (the European Fusion Program integrated in the work of the International Thermonuclear Experimental Reactor), mobile navigation, environment reconstruction and mobile robotics cooperation.

She is the author or coauthor of more than 150 published scientific articles and has written one book. She has also made many presentations at conferences and schools where she introduces audience members of all ages to the science of robotics.

=== Leadership roles ===
- Responsible for the Mobile Robotics Laboratory at the University of Lisbon from 1994 to 2009
- Chair of the IFAC Technical Committee on Intelligent Autonomous Vehicles (2005–2008) and a member of the EURON Education key area
- Adviser to the Board of Directors of the Portuguese Foundation for Science and Technology (FCT) for R&D projects, 2008 to 2011
- Vice-President of IST for Administrative and Financial Affairs in (2012 and 2013) and for Administrative Modernization (from 2020 to 2021)
- Vice-President of the IST School Council, June 2014 to January 2016
- Member of the FCT Board of Directors, February 2016 to August 2017

=== Selected honors and distinctions ===
- Elected one of Portugal's "Women in Science" by Ciência Viva in 2016
- Named a Distinguished Professor of IST in 2018
- Elected a Corresponding Member of the Portuguese Academy of Sciences in 2023
