= The Priest and the Girl =

1966 film

- Theatrical release poster
- Directed by: Joaquim Pedro de Andrade
- Written by: Joaquim Pedro de Andrade
- Based on: O Padre e a Moça by Carlos Drummond de Andrade
- Produced by: Luiz Carlos Barreto; Joaquim Pedro de Andrade
- Starring: Helena Ignez; Paulo José
- Cinematography: Mário Carneiro
- Edited by: Joaquim Pedro de Andrade; Eduardo Escorel
- Music by: César Guerra-Peixe; Carlos Lyra
- Production companies: Difilm; Filmes do Triângulo; Filmes do Serro
- Distributed by: Difilm; Embrafilme
- Release date: 28 March 1966
- Running time: 90 minutes
- Country: Brazil
- Language: Portuguese

The Priest and the Girl (Portuguese: O Padre e a Moça) is a 1966 Brazilian drama film directed by Joaquim Pedro de Andrade, based on Carlos Drummond de Andrade's poem of the same name. The directorial debut of Andrade, it was shot on São Gonçalo dos Rios das Pedras, Gruta de Maquiné, and Espinhaço Mountains, all locations of Minas Gerais.

== Plot ==
It is set in 1965 in São Gonçalo dos Rios das Pedras, a district of Serro, Minas Gerais. A newly ordained priest arrives at the town and meets Fortunato, an influential merchant, and his concubine, Mariana. The girl's father, a prospector, died when she was ten and she was raised by Fortunato. When she becomes older, Fortunato wants to marry Mariana, but she and the priest run away together.

== Cast ==
- Helena Ignez as Mariana
- Paulo José as Priest
- Mário Lago as Fortunato
- Fauzi Arap as Vitorino
- Rosa Sandrini as Devotee

== Reception ==
It won the Prêmio Governador do Estado da Guanabara (lit. "State of Guanabara Governor Award") from the Comissão de Auxílio à Indústria Cinematográfica do Rio de Janeiro (lit. "Commission for Assistance to the Film Industry of Rio de Janeiro") in 1965. It was entered into the 16th Berlin International Film Festival.
