= Case of the Naves Brothers =

1967 film

- Theatrical release poster
- Directed by: Luis Sérgio Person
- Written by: Jean-Claude Bernadet; Luis Sérgio Person
- Based on: O Caso dos Irmãos Naves by João Alamy Filho
- Produced by: Glauco Mirko Laurelli; Luis Sérgio Person
- Starring: Raul Cortez; Juca de Oliveira
- Cinematography: Oswaldo de Oliveira
- Edited by: Glauco Mirko Laurelli
- Production companies: MC Filmes; Lauper Filmes
- Distributed by: MC Filmes
- Release date: 5 June 1967
- Running time: 92 minutes
- Country: Brazil
- Language: Portuguese

Case of the Naves Brothers (Portuguese: O Caso dos Irmãos Naves) is a 1967 Brazilian drama film directed by Luis Sérgio Person. Based on the João Alamy Filho novel of the same name, it follows the story of Joaquim and Sebastião Naves, who were arrested during the Estado Novo dictatorship in the 1930's and tortured until confessing to a crime they had not committed. Produced during the early years of the Military Dictatorship in Brazil, the film draws parallels with the ongoing human and legal violations perpetrated by the regime.

The film was entered into the 5th Moscow International Film Festival. It was also selected as the Brazilian entry for the Best Foreign Language Film at the 40th Academy Awards, but was not nominated.

== Cast ==
- Raul Cortez as Joaquim Naves
- Juca de Oliveira as Sebastião Naves
- Anselmo Duarte as Deputy commissioner
- John Herbert as Dr. Alamy
- Sérgio Hingst as judge
- Lélia Abramo as Donana
- Júlia Miranda as Joaquim's wife
- Cacilda Lanuza as Sebastião's wife
- Hiltrud Holz

== See also ==
- List of submissions to the 40th Academy Awards for Best Foreign Language Film
- List of Brazilian submissions for the Academy Award for Best Foreign Language Film
