= Luis Sérgio Person =

- Born: 12 February 1936; São Paulo, Brazil
- Died: 7 January 1976 (aged 39)
- Occupations: Actor, film director
- Years active: 1962–1974

Luis Sérgio Person (12 February 1936 – 7 January 1976) was a Brazilian actor, director, screenwriter and producer.

Person was born in São Paulo and is best known for his 1967 film, Case of the Naves Brothers, which was entered into the 5th Moscow International Film Festival.

In 2007, his daughter Marina Person released the documentary Person about his life.

== Filmography ==
- 1974 - Vicente do Rego Monteiro
- 1972 - Cassy Jones, o Magnífico Sedutor
- 1968 - Panca de Valente
- 1968 - Trilogia do Terror (Episódio: A Procissão dos Mortos)
- 1967 - O Caso dos Irmãos Naves
- 1967 - Um Marido Barra Limpa
- 1965 - São Paulo, Sociedade Anônima
- 1963 - II palazzo Doria Pamphili
- 1963 - L'ottimista sorridente (curta-metragem)
- 1962 - Al ladro (curta-metragem)
