= Darlene Glória =

Brazilian actress (born 1943)

- Born: Helena Maria Glória Vianna; March 20, 1943 (age 83); São José do Calçado, Brazil
- Occupation: Actress
- Years active: 1965-present

Darlene Glória (born March 20, 1943) is a Brazilian actress.

== Career ==
=== Films ===
Films
Year	Title	Character
1965	Um Ramo para Luísa	Jane
1965	São Paulo, Sociedade Anônima	Ana
1965	Choque de Sentimentos	—N/a
1966	Paraíba, Vida e Morte de um Bandido	Dona Clara
1966	Nudista à Força	—N/a
1967	Terra em Transe	Mulher da Orgia
1968	Os Viciados	Eugênia
1969	Papai Trapalhão	—N/a
1969	Os Raptores	Mulher de Sena
1969	Os Paqueras	Suzy
1969	O Matador Profissional	—N/a
1969	Golias contra o Homem das Bolinhas	Irene
1971	Os Devassos	Rosenda
1971	Lua de Mel e Amendoim	Amiga da mãe de Serginho
1972	Eu Transo, Ela Transa	Gilda
1972	A Viúva Virgem	Tamara
1973	Toda Nudez Será Castigada	Geni
1973	Os Homens Que Eu Tive	Pity
1974	Um Homem Célebre	Marcela
1974	O Marginal	Leina
1999	Até que a Vida nos Separe	João's mother
2004	Ninguém Suporta a Glória	Ela Mesma
2006	Anjos do Sol	Vera
2008	Feliz Natal	Mércia
2011	Três Vezes por Semana	Senhora
2013	Corpo Presente	—N/a

=== Television ===
Telenovelas, Series and Minisseries
Ano	Título	Papel
1969	Véu de Noiva	Leda Dary Reis
1972	O Bofe	Darlene
1987	Carmen	Verônica/Ester
1990	Araponga	Daisy Sheldon
1991	O Guarani	Freira Ritta
1998	Pecado Capital	Aurora
2004	A Diarista	Madame Gigi
2009	Mutantes - Promessas de Amor	Arlete
2009	Força-Tarefa	Lara
