= Helena Ignez =

Brazilian actress and filmmaker (born 1942)

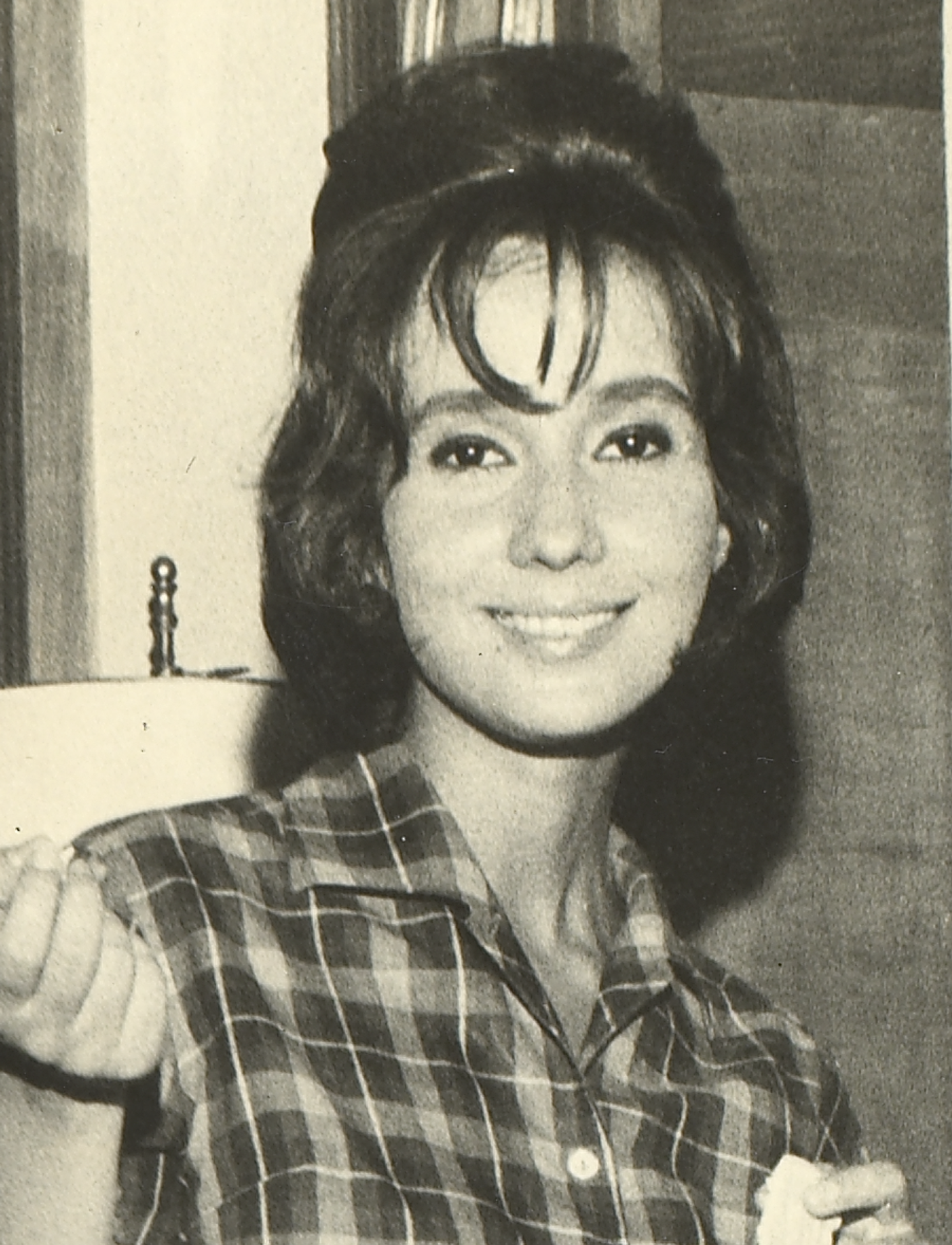
- Ignez in 1963
- Born: May 23, 1942 (age 83); Salvador, Bahia, Brazil
- Occupation: Actress

Helena Ignez (born May 23, 1942) is a Brazilian actress and filmmaker who participated in the Cinema Marginal movement during the 1960s and 70s alongside Rogério Sganzerla and Glauber Rocha.

== Biography ==
Helena was born in Salvador, Bahia and was attending her second year of law school when she fell in love with theater and decided to study the Dramatic Arts at the Federal University of Bahia. At the time, the Bahian theater scene was breaking with traditional Brazilian theater and experiencing strong influence from the young vanguard. She first appeared on the screen in Glauber Rocha's film Pátio.

== Cinema Marginal ==
Helena acted in a few more films, such as A Grande Feira (1961), Assalto ao Trem Pagador (1962), and O Padre e a Moça (1966) before playing Janete Jane in O Bandido da Luz Vermelha by Rogério Sganzerla. After this film, she would perform in some most significant films in the Cinema Marginal movement, the most noted being her role as Ângela Carne e Osso in A Mulher de Todos (1969). She also was a financial partner in Rogério Sganzerla and Júlio Bressane Belair production company. Between 1968 and 1970, Sganzerla and Ignez made almost a dozen films together and were also married and had two children. In 1972 she took a turn in her career and decided to film in Europe, the United States and Africa, making an untitled super-8 film.

== Filmography ==
=== Film ===
==== Acting ====
Year	Title	Role	Notes
1959	O Pátio	Jovem no Pátio	Short
1961	A Grande Feira	Ely	
1962	O Assalto ao Trem Pagador	Marta	
1964	O Grito da Terra		
1965	O Padre e a Moça	Mariana	
1967	Cara a Cara	Luciana	
1968	O Bandido da Luz Vermelha	Janete Jane	
1968	Os Marginais		(segment "Guilherme")
1968	O Engano	Esposa do Doutor	
1969	A Mulher de Todos	Ângela Carne e Osso	
1969	Um Homem e Sua Jaula	Aeromoça	
1970	Sem Essa, Aranha	Mulher	
1970	Os Monstros de Babaloo	Daughter	
1970	Cuidado Madame	Empregada	
1970	Copacabana Mon Amour	Sônia Silk	
1970	Barão Olavo, o Horrível	Isabel	
1970	A Família do Barulho		
1973	Um Intruso no Paraíso		
1975	Carnaval na Lama	Betty	
1986	Nem Tudo É Verdade		
1992	Perfume de Gardênia	Burglar	
1992	Oswaldianas		(segment "Perigo Negro")
1993	Perigo Negro		
1999	São Jerônimo	Marcela	
2005	O Signo do Caos	Guida	
2007	Jurando que Viu a Periquita	Rainha da Amazônia	Short
2007	Meu Mundo em Perigo	Mãe de Ísis	
2008	A Bela P...	Narradora	Video short
2008	Encarnação do Demônio	Cabíria	
2009	Hotel Atlântico	Dona da Pousada	
2012	Jetlag	Mãe	Short
2012	A Balada do Provisório		
2013	Desculpa, Dona Madama		Short
2014	Paixão e Virtude	Gustave Flaubert	
2016	Xavier	Professora	Short, Voice
2016	Ralé	Sonia Silk	
2017	Antes do Fim	Helena	
2018	A Moça do Calendário	Narrator	
2019	Tragam-me a Cabeça de Carmen M.	Diretora	

==== Directing ====
Key
†	Indicates a documentary	‡	Indicates a short film

List of films directed by Helena Ignez
Year	Original title	English release title	Language(s)	Notes
2005	A Miss e o Dinossauro ^{†}		Portuguese	Short documentary on the Bel-Air film production company.
2007	Canção de Baal	Canção de Baal	Portuguese	Co-directed with Michele Matalon. Based on Baal, by Bertolt Brecht.
2010	Luz nas Trevas: A Volta do Bandido da Luz Vermelha	Light in Darkness: The Return of the Red Light Bandit	Portuguese	Co-directed with Ícaro Martins.
2013	Poder dos Afetos ^{‡}	Power of Affections	Portuguese	
2013	Feio, Eu? ^{†}		Portuguese	Brazilian-indian-french co-production.
2016	Ralé	Ralé	Portuguese	
2018	A Moça do Calendário	My Calendar Girl	Portuguese	

== Television ==
Year	Title	Role	Notes
1997	Você Decide	—	
1992	Tereza Batista	Maricota	
1991	Meu Marido	Promotora	
1968	A Última Testemunha	Mina	

== On stage ==
- 1969 – Hair
