= Lisa Negri =

Brazilian actress

Lisa Negri (born Elisa Biondi, São Paulo, July 11, 1941 – died December 19, 2014) was a Brazilian actress. Among her main acting roles on Brazilian television are the soap operas Quem Casa com Maria? (1964), Teresa (1965), Os Ossos do Barão (1973) and As Pupilas do Senhor Reitor (1995) on television, and A Virgem e o Machão (1974), Dezenove Mulheres e Um Homem (1977), Pintando o Sexo (1977) and Os Boiadeiros (1979) in the movies.
