= Odete Lara =

Brazilian actress (1929–2015)

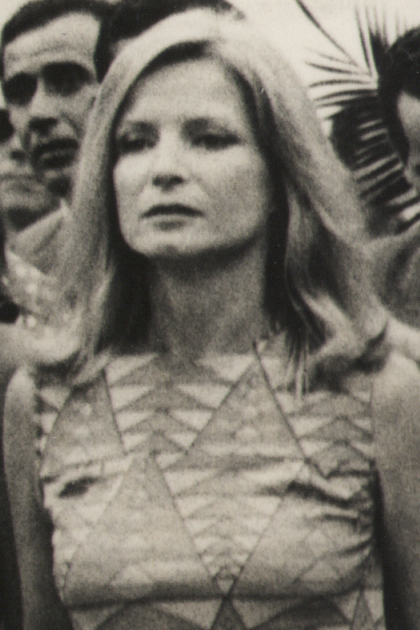
- Odete Lara in 1968
- Born: Odete Righi Bertoluzzi; 17 April 1929; São Paulo, Brazil
- Died: 4 February 2015 (aged 85); Rio de Janeiro, Brazil
- Occupation: Actress
- Years active: 1954–1994

Odete Lara (born Odete Righi Bertoluzzi; 17 April 1929 – 4 February 2015) was a Brazilian film actress. She appeared in 37 films between 1954 and 1994, including two films shown at the Cannes Film Festival. In 1957 she was awarded with Prêmio Saci.

== Biography ==
She was the only daughter of Giuseppe Bertoluzzi and Virgínia Righi, immigrants from Belluno, northern Italy. Her mother committed suicide when Odete was six years old, which led to her being placed in a convent orphanage. Years later, she went to live at her godmother’s house. She was deeply attached to her father, her only emotional reference, but he, stricken with tuberculosis, was forced to remain apart from his daughter. Giuseppe died when Odete was 18, also by suicide.

Her first job was as a secretary and typist. Encouraged by a friend, she took a modeling course at the Museu de Arte Moderna de São Paulo and participated in the first fashion show in Brazilian history, held at MASP. Her beauty impressed Otomar dos Santos, who recommended her to the then newly inaugurated TV Tupi, owned by Assis Chateaubriand.

She began her work in television as a commercial spokesperson. She then appeared in the television version of Luz de Gás, alongside Tônia Carrero and Paulo Autran, followed by Branca Neve e os sete anões, in which she played the Evil Queen.

Odete Lara became a star of TV de Vanguarda, one of TV Tupi’s biggest attractions. Some of the telenovelas in which she acted on that network were: As Bruxas, A Volta de Beto Rockfeller, and Em Busca da Felicidade. She was hired by the theatrical group of the Teatro Brasileiro de Comédia (TBC) and made her stage debut in the play Santa Marta Fabril S/A, directed by Adolfo Celi.

Her first film was O Gato de Madame (1956), alongside Mazzaropi, at the invitation of writer Abílio Pereira de Almeida. Her final film appearance was in the feature film O Princípio do Prazer (1979).

She was also a singer in stage productions such as Skindô, alongside Vinícius de Moraes (which was also recorded as an album); Eles e Ela, with Sérgio Mendes; Meu Refrão, with Chico Buarque; and Quem Samba Fica, with Sidnei Miller. She also participated in the LP Contrastes.

She published three autobiographical books: Eu Nua, Minha Jornada Interior, and Meus Passos na Busca da Paz. Following her conversion, she translated several works on Buddhism.

She was married to playwright Oduvaldo Vianna Filho and film director Antonio Carlos Fontoura. Open about her romantic life, she also had an affair with novelist Euclydes Marinho.

Due to serious health problems, she returned to Rio de Janeiro, living in the traditional neighborhood of Flamengo with a companion. Odete Lara died on 4 February 2015, at the age of 85, after suffering a heart attack in her sleep. Her body was cremated in Nova Friburgo.

The film Lara (2002) was based on the story of her life.

== Filmography ==
=== Films ===
- 1956 – O Gato de Madame
- 1957 – Absolutamente Certo
- 1957 – Arara Vermelha
- 1958 – Uma Certa Lucrécia
- 1959 – Dona Xepa
- 1959 – Moral em concordata
- 1960 – Sábado a la noche, cine
- 1960 – Dona Violante Miranda
- 1960 – Duas Histórias
- 1960 – Na Garganta do Diabo
- 1961 – Esse Rio que Eu Amo
- 1961 – Mulheres e Milhões
- 1962 – Boca de Ouro
- 1962 – Sete Evas
- 1963 – Bonitinha, mas Ordinária
- 1963 – Sonhando com Milhões
- 1964 – Noite Vazia
- 1964 – Pão de Açúcar
- 1965 – Mar Corrente
- 1967 – As Sete Faces de Um Cafajeste
- 1968 – Câncer em Família
- 1969 – Copacabana Me Engana
- 1969 – O Dragão da Maldade contra o Santo Guerreiro
- 1969 – The Heirs
- 1970 – Em Família
- 1970 – Vida e Glória de Um Canalha
- 1971 – Aventuras com Tio Maneco
- 1971 – Lúcia McCartney, uma Garota de Programa
- 1971 – O Jogo da Vida e da Morte
- 1971 – Viver de Morrer
- 1972 – Quando o Carnaval Chegar
- 1973 – Primeiros Momentos
- 1973 – Vai Trabalhar Vagabundo
- 1974 – A Estrela Sobe
- 1974 – A Rainha Diaba
- 1975 – Assim Era a Atlântida
- 1978 – O Princípio do Prazer
- 1986 – Um Filme 100% Brasileiro
- 2001 – Barra 68 – Sem Perder a Ternura

=== Television ===
- 1965 – Em Busca da Felicidade
- 1970 – As Bruxas
- 1973 – A Volta de Beto Rockfeller
- 1991 – O Dono do Mundo
- 1994 – Pátria Minha
