= Walter Hugo Khouri =

Brazilian film director, screenwriter, and producer

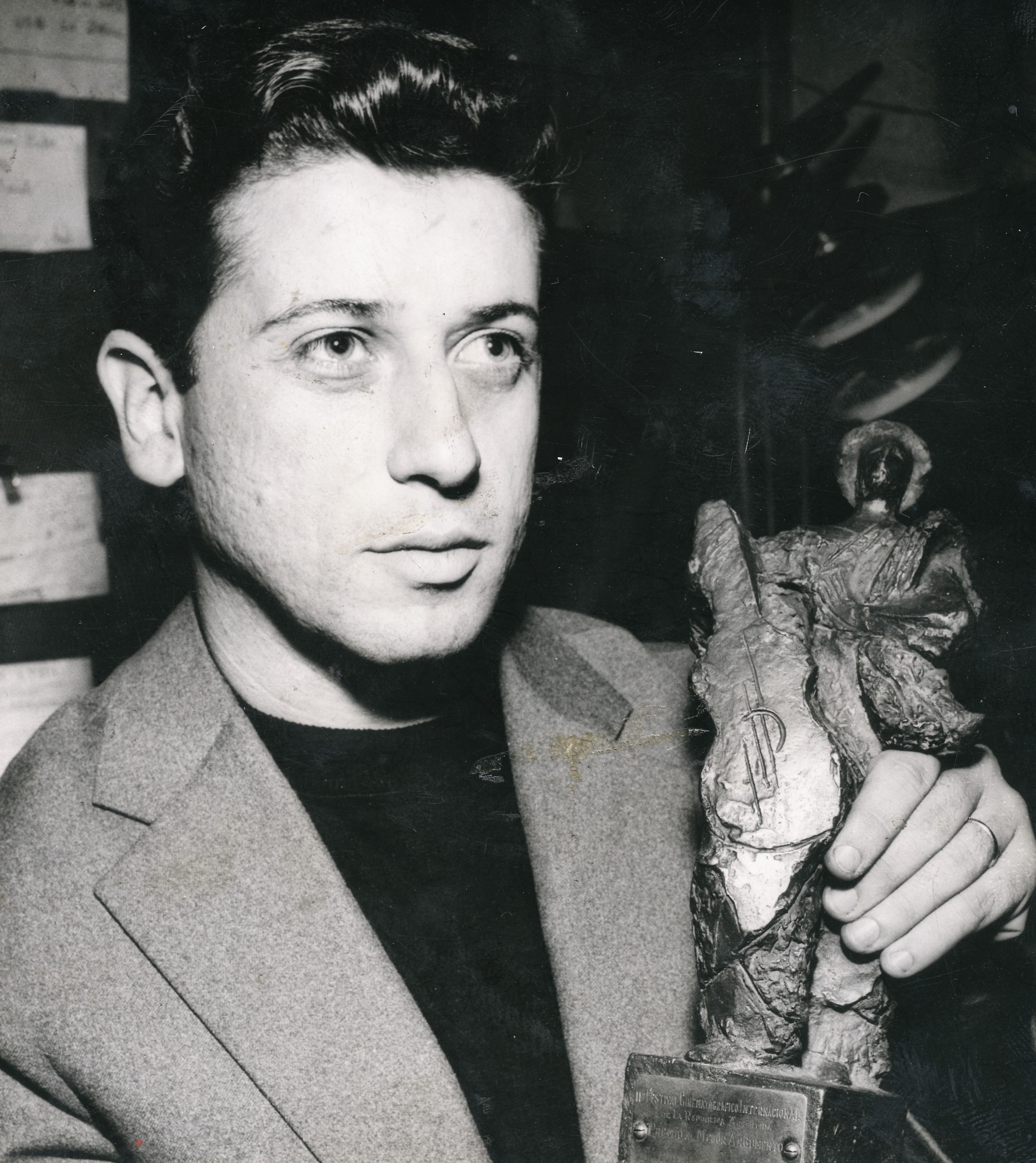
- Born: 21 October 1929; São Paulo, Brazil
- Died: 27 June 2003 (aged 73); São Paulo, Brazil
- Education: University of São Paulo
- Occupations: Film director, screenwriter, producer
- Years active: 1953–1998
- Notable work: Empty Night (1964)

Walter Hugo Khouri (São Paulo, 21 October 1929 – São Paulo, 27 June 2003) was a Brazilian film director, screenwriter, and producer of Lebanese and Italian descent.

Khouri made 25 feature films and won several national and international awards. His 1964 film Empty Night is considered one of the best Brazilian films of all time and was entered for the Palm d'Or in the 1965 Cannes Film Festival.

His films show characters, mostly male, who seek meaning for a distressing existence. He was also known for welcoming and introducing young professionals, being the first director to cast the presenter Xuxa Meneghel in the controversial 1982 film Love Strange Love.

== Filmography ==
- 2001 – The Beasts (filmed in 1998)
- 1999 – Lost Passion
- 1991 – Forever
- 1987 – Monica and the Mermaid of Rio
- 1986 – I
- 1984 – Voracious Love
- 1982 – Love Strange Love
- 1981 – Eros, the God of Love
- 1980 – Invitation to Pleasure
- 1979 – The Sex Prisoner
- 1978 – The Daughters of Fire
- 1977 – Passion and Shadows
- 1975 – The Desire
- 1974 – The Angel of the Night
- 1973 – The Last Rapture
- 1972 – The Goddesses
- 1970 – The Palace of Angels
- 1970 – Pindorama (produced)
- 1968 – The Amorous Ones
- 1967 – Burning Body
- 1966 – The Cariocas
- 1964 – Men and Women
- 1962 – The Island
- 1959 – In the Throat of the Devil
- 1959 – Borders of Hell
- 1958 – Strange Encounter
- 1953 – The Stone Giant
