= Liberato (disambiguation) =

Liberato (died 269 AD) was a Christian martyr from Italy.

Liberato may also refer to:

- Liberato (name), a personal name and surname
- Liberato (singer), Italian singer
  - Liberato (album), debut studio album by Liberato
  - Liberato II, second studio album by Liberato
  - Liberato III, third studio album by Liberato

== Places ==
- Tenuta di San Liberato, Bracciano, Italy
- Liberato Salzano, in Rio Grande do Sul, Brazil

== Other ==
- BRP Liberato Picar (PC-377), a Philippine ship
