= Liberati (surname) =

Liberati is a surname. Notable people with the surname include:

- Alessandro Liberati (1954–2012), Italian healthcare researcher
- Allessandro Liberati (1847–1927), cornet player and virtuoso
- Antimo Liberati (1617–1692), Italian music theorist
- Edoardo Liberati (born 1992), Italian professional racing driver
- Ernest Liberati (1908–1983), French footballer
- Franciscus Liberati (1615–1703), Roman Catholic prelate
- Frank Liberati (born 1964), American politician
- Giulio Liberati (1913–?), Italian professional football player
- Libero Liberati (1926–1962), Italian motorcycle racer
- Simon Liberati (born 1960), French writer and journalist
- Tullio Liberati (born 1968), American politician

== See also ==
- Liberato (disambiguation)
- Liberatore, surname
- Stadio Libero Liberati, stadium in Terni, Umbria
