= Liberator =

Liberator, Liberators, The Liberator or The Liberators may refer to:

== Arts and entertainment ==
=== Film and television ===
- The Liberator (film), a 2013 film
- The Liberators, a 1987 television film first aired on The Disney Sunday Movie
- The Liberators: Fighting on Two Fronts in World War II, a 1992 documentary
- The Liberator (miniseries), a 2020 Netflix miniseries
- "The Liberator", Fireside Theatre season 8, episode 20 (1956)
- "The Liberator", Hallmark Hall of Fame season 3, episode 29 (1954)
- "The Liberator", Planet of the Apes season 13 (1974)
- "The Liberators", Court Martial episode 5 (1966)
- "The Liberators", Espionage episode 21 (1964)
- "The Liberators", The Rebel season 2, episode 16 (1961)
- Liberator, a spacecraft in the British science fiction television series Blake's 7

=== Literature ===
- The Liberators (Suvorov book), a 1981 non-fiction book by Victor Suvorov about the Soviet Army
- The Liberators (comic), a British comic book
- Liberators, a 2009 novel by James Wesley Rawles, from the Patriots series

=== Music ===
- Liberators (American band)
- Liberator (band), a Swedish ska band formed in 1994
- Liberator (album), a 1993 album by Orchestral Manoeuvres in the Dark
- "Liberator", a song by Spear of Destiny from the 1984 album One Eyed Jacks

=== Other arts and entertainment ===
- Liberator (Nedor Comics), a superhero from the Golden Age of Comics
- The Liberators (Ultimate Marvel), the Ultimate Marvel incarnation of the Masters of Evil
- Liberator (video game), a 1982 arcade game by Atari Games
- Liberators (video game), a World War II strategy game by Mutantbox

== Military ==
- Consolidated B-24 Liberator, an American World War II heavy bomber
- USS Liberator, several United States Navy ships
- FP-45 Liberator, a World War II pistol used by resistance forces in occupied territories
- Liberator (mine), a naval mine developed by the US Navy
- 14th Armored Division (United States), nicknamed "The Liberators"
- 5th Infantry Division (Philippines), nicknamed "Liberator"
- "Liberator", nickname of the Harley-Davidson WLA, a motorcycle used by the US Army in World War II

== Publications ==
- The Liberator (newspaper) (1831–1865), an American abolitionist newspaper
- The Liberator (1900–1913), an African-American newspaper published in Los Angeles, California by Jefferson Lewis Edmonds
- The Liberator (magazine) (1918–24), an American monthly communist periodical
- Liberator (magazine), a British magazine of radical liberalism founded in 1970
- The Liberator Magazine, an American magazine first published in 2002
- The Liberator, a Paris-based journal that published an article about King George V that led to the 1911 libel conviction of Edward Mylius
- The Liberator, the school newspaper of Liberal Arts and Sciences Academy in Austin, Texas

== People ==
- Alexander II of Russia (1818–1881), Emperor of Russia, also known as Alexander the Liberator
- Daniel O'Connell (1775–1847), Irish statesman known as "the Liberator"
- Pedro I of Brazil (1798–1834), founder and first ruler of the Empire of Brazil, nicknamed "the Liberator"
- Liberator (died 4th century), Christian martyr

== Other uses ==
- Liberator (gun), the world's first fully 3D printable gun
- Winchester Liberator, a derringer shotgun
- Thorn EMI Liberator, a laptop-type portable word processor produced in the mid-1980s
- Liberator, software or its associated marketing campaign for the 1960s-era Honeywell 200 computer

== See also ==
- Saint Liberator (disambiguation)
- Liberatore (disambiguation)
- Liberatores, the assassins of Julius Caesar
- Libertadores, the principal leaders of the Latin American wars of independence from Spain and Portugal
- Simón Bolívar (1783–1830), known as "El Libertador" in Spanish
- José de San Martín (1778–1850), known as "El Libertador" in Spanish
- "La Liberatora", Fantasy Island season 5, episode 5b (1981)
