= O Papa É Pop =

O Papa é Pop

Studio album by Engenheiros do Hawaii
- Released: 1990
- Recorded: Winter of 1990; BMG Studios, Rio de Janeiro, Brazil
- Genre: Rock, Alternative rock
- Length: 47:23
- Label: BMG Brasil
- Producer: Engenheiros do Hawaii

Engenheiros do Hawaii chronology
Alívio Imediato (1989)	O Papa é Pop (1990)	Varias Variáveis (1991)

Singles from O Papa é Pop
- 1. "Era um Garoto, que como Eu, Amava os Beatles e os Rolling Stones"; 2. "O Papa é Pop"; 3. "O Exército de um Homem Só I"; 4. "Pra Ser Sincero"

O Papa É Pop (English: The Pope is Pop) is an album by Brazilian rock band Engenheiros do Hawaii, released in 1990. It is considered the best-selling album of the band, with more than 250,000 copies (Platinum) in its first year.

== Track list ==
All songs written by Humberto Gessinger, except where indicated.

=== Side A / Pope ("Lado Papa") ===
1. "O Exército de um Homem Só I (One Man Army I)" (Augusto Licks; Humberto Gessinger) – 4:51
2. "Era um Garoto que, como Eu, Amava os Beatles e os Rolling Stones (There Was A Young Man Who, Just Like Me, loved the Beatles and the Rolling Stones')" (Franco Migliacci; Mauro Lusini; ver. Brancato Júnior) – 4:25
3. "O Exército de um Homem Só II (One Man Army II)" (Augusto Licks; Humberto Gessinger) – 1:23
4. "Nunca Mais Poder (To Never Be Able)" (Augusto Licks; Humberto Gessinger) – 4:36
5. "Pra Ser Sincero (To Be Honest)" (Augusto Licks; Humberto Gessinger) – 3:11
6. "Olhos Iguais aos Seus (Eyes Like Yours)" – 3:45

=== Side B / Pop ("Lado Pop") ===
1. "O Papa é Pop (The Pope Is Pop)" – 3:48
2. "A Violência Travestida Faz Seu Trottoir (The Disguised Violence Makes Its Trottoir)" – 6:53
3. "Anoiteceu em Porto Alegre (Night Fell In Porto Alegre)" – 8:06
4. "Ilusão de Ótica (Optical Illusion)" – 2:47
5. "Perfeita Simetria (Perfect Symmetry)" (bonus-track exclusiva do CD) – 3:34
