= Liberato (name) =

Origin
- Origin: Latin
- Region of origin: Italy

Other names
- Variant form: Librelato

Liberato is a personal name and surname, being a Portuguese, Spanish and Italian variant of the Latin name Liberatus, that means free man, referring to a slave who was freed, described as “the one who gets freedom”.

== Surname ==
- Gugu Liberato (1959–2019), Brazilian television presenter, entrepreneur, actor and singer
- Jorge Liberato Urosa Savino (1942–2021), Venezuelan cardinal
- Ingra Lyberato (1966), Brazilian actress
- Liana Liberato (1995), American actress
- Luciano de Liberato (1947), Italian painter
- Luis Liberato (1995), Dominican baseball player
- Roberto Liberato (1965), Swiss sprinter canoer

== Name ==
- Liberato (d. 269 AD), Christian martyr from Italy
- Liberato Cacace (2000), New Zealand professional footballer
- Liberato Marcial Rojas (1870—1922), Paraguayan president
- Liberato Pinto (1880—1949), Portuguese Lieutenant Colonel
