= Parthenope =

Parthenope (/pɑːrˈθɛnəpi/ parth-EN-ə-pee; Ancient Greek: Παρθενόπη) may refer to:

- Parthenope (siren), one of the sirens in Greek mythology

== People ==
- Parthenope, in Greek mythology, the daughter of Ancaeus
- Frances Parthenope Verney, Parthenope Nightingale, the elder sister of Florence Nightingale and wife of Sir Harry Verney, named after her place of birth in Naples
- Parthenope Wald-Harding, musician

== Geography ==
- Parthenope (Naples), an ancient Greek settlement now part of Naples, Italy
- Parthenopaean Republic, a short-lived republic established in Naples during the French Revolution, named for the ancient Greek settlement

== Music ==
- Parthenope, band from New York featuring Jennifer Charles and Doveman

== Other uses ==
- Parthenope (film), a 2024 film by Paolo Sorrentino
- Parthenope (crab), a genus of crabs in the family Parthenopidae
- Parthenope (fungus), a genus of fungi in the order Helotiales
- 11 Parthenope, an asteroid
- Partenopei, nickname of Italian football club S.S.C. Napoli

== See also ==
- Partenope (disambiguation)
