= Crisafulli =

Crisafulli is an Italian surname. Notable people with the surname include:

- Chuck Crisafulli (born 1961), American author, culture writer and musician
- David Crisafulli (born 1979), Australian politician
- Fabrizio Crisafulli, Italian theatre director and visual artist
- Henri Crisafulli (1827–1900), French playwright
- Steve Crisafulli (born 1971), American politician
