= Miss Brazil World 1996 =

- Date: October 11, 1996
- Presenters: Nuno Leal Maia
- Venue: Ginásio Humberto Nesi, Natal, Rio Grande do Norte, Brazil
- Broadcaster: Central Nacional de Televisão
- Entrants: 26
- Placements: 12
- Winner: Anuska Prado; Espírito Santo
- Congeniality: Pherla Aline Fischer; Minas Gerais

The Miss Brazil World 1996 pageant took place on October 11, 1996. Each state and the Federal District (with the exception of Amapá) competed for the title of the Brazilian Crown for Miss World. The winner entered Miss World 1996. Anuska Prado of Espírito Santo ended being the winner at the end of the contest.

== Results ==
Final results	Contestant
Miss Brazil World 1996	Espírito Santo - Anuska Prado
1st Runner-up	Minas Gerais - Pherla Aline Fischer
2nd Runner-up	Paraná - Karina Luiza Bomm
3rd Runner-up	Rio Grande do Norte - Louisianne Alves
4th Runner-up	Rio de Janeiro - Maria Gabriela Gomes
Top 10	Maranhão - Shanna Botelho; Mato Grosso do Sul - Iara Soares; Pernambuco - Tatiana Queiroga; Rio Grande do Sul - Patrícia Ferigolo; Santa Catarina - Patricia Stahnke; São Paulo - Juliana Sarri; Tocantins - Dhênia Gerhardt

=== Special awards ===
- Miss Congeniality - Pherla Aline Fischer (Minas Gerais)
- Best Casual Wear - Pherla Aline Fischer (Minas Gerais)
- Miss Evening Wear - Pherla Aline Fischer (Minas Gerais)

== Delegates ==
The delegates for Miss Brazil World 1996 were:

- Acre - Lalsemi Luiza Silva
- Alagoas - Patrícia Barreto Cavalcanti
- Amazonas - Jaci Leni Cardozo Nunes
- Bahia - Isolda Carla Vasconcelos de Almeida
- Ceará - Fátima Cristina Mendonça
- Distrito Federal - Lucimara Fernandes
- Espírito Santo - Anuska Prado
- Goiás - Joyce Emilita de Oliveira Queiroz
- Maranhão - Shanna Cristina Botelho Barros
- Mato Grosso - Velma Nelmane de Sousa Campos
- Mato Grosso do Sul - Iara Soares
- Minas Gerais - Pherla Aline Fischer
- Pará - Cirlene Cristina Amorim Galvão
- Paraíba - Ana Carla Vieira
- Paraná - Karina Luiza Bomm
- Pernambuco - Tatiana Galvão de Queiroga Lopes
- Piauí - Maria José Melo Meneses de Santana
- Rio de Janeiro - Maria Gabriela Dias Gomes
- Rio Grande do Norte - Louisianne Soraya Drummond Alves
- Rio Grande do Sul - Patrícia Ferigolo
- Rondônia - Fabrine Félix Fosse
- Roraima - Tatiana Reis Barbosa
- Santa Catarina - Patrícia Stahnke Santos
- São Paulo - Juliana Sarri Borges
- Sergipe - Keila Viviane Santos Melo
- Tocantins - Dhênia Gerhardt

== Did not compete ==
- Amapá
