= Partenope (disambiguation) =

Partenope is a 1730 opera by George Frideric Handel.

Partenope may also refer to:

- Partenope (Vinci), a 1725 opera by Leonardo Vinci
- Partenope (Zumaya), a 1711 opera by Manuel de Zumaya
- Partenope, a 1995 opera by Ennio Morricone
- Partenope Napoli Basket, an Italian amateur basketball team from Naples, Campania
- Partenope-class cruiser, a group of eight torpedo cruisers built for the Italian Regia Marina
- Italian cruiser Partenope, torpedo cruiser built for the Italian Regia Marina
- Partenope (song), the opening piece of Liberato's second album (Liberato II)

== See also ==
- Parthenope (disambiguation)
