= Tenuta =

Tenuta is an Italian word meaning estate. It may refer to:

- Jon Tenuta (born 1957), American football coach
- Juan Manuel Tenuta (1924–2013), Argentinian-Uruguayan actor (es)
- Judy Tenuta (1956–2022), American entertainer
- Luke Tenuta (born 1999), American football player
- Saverio Tenuta (1969–2023), Italian comics artist (it)

== See also ==
- Tenuta dell'Ornellaia, Italian wine producer
- Tenuta di San Liberato, Bracciano, estate in Italy
- Tenuta San Guido, Italian wine producer
