= Longe Demais das Capitais =

Studio album by Engenheiros do Hawaii
- Released: 1986
- Recorded: 1986 in São Paulo
- Genre: Rock, post-punk
- Label: BMG/RCA
- Producer: Reinaldo B. Brito

Engenheiros do Hawaii chronology
Longe Demais das Capitais (1986)	A Revolta dos Dândis (1987)

Longe Demais das Capitais (transl. Too Far From the Capitals) is the debut studio album by the Brazilian rock band Engenheiros do Hawaii, released in 1986.

== Tracks ==
No.	Title	Length
1.	"Toda Forma de Poder" (All Forms of Power)	3:16
2.	"Segurança" (Safety)	3:19
3.	"Eu Ligo pra Você" (I Care About You)	3:37
4.	"Nossas Vidas" (Our Lives)	3:07
5.	"Fé Nenhuma" (No Faith)	2:46
6.	"Beijos pra Torcida" (Kisses For The Crowd)	1:46
7.	"Todo Mundo É uma Ilha" (Everyone's An Island)	2:46
8.	"Longe Demais das Capitais" (Too Far From The Capitals)	4:10
9.	"Sweet Begonia"	2:32
10.	"Nada a Ver" (Nothing to Do With)	3:20
11.	"Crônica" (Chronicle)	2:47
12.	"Sopa de Letrinhas" (Alphabet Soup)	3:08
Total length:		36:41

== Personnel ==
- Humberto Gessinger: Vocals and Electric Guitar
- Marcelo Pitz: Bass guitar and Vocals (Backing)
- Carlos Maltz: Drums and Vocals (Backing), Creative consultant
- Walter Lima: Recording Technician
- Miguel Plopschi: Art Direction
- Tadeu Valério: Graphic Coordinator
- Reinaldo B. Brito: Producer
