= Russell Page =

British gardener, garden designer and landscape architect

Russel Page, c.1956

Montague Russell Page OBE (1 November 1906 – 4 January 1985) was a British gardener, garden designer and landscape architect. He worked in the UK, western Europe and the United States of America.

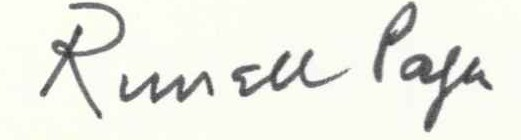

== Biography ==
Montague Russell Page was born in Lincolnshire, the second son of the three children of Ida Flora, née Martin (1875–1963) and her husband, Harold Ethelbert Page (1876-1966), a solicitor in Lincoln. He was educated at Charterhouse School in Surrey (1918–24), going on to study in London at the Slade School of Fine Art in London University (1924–26), under Professor Henry Tonks. From 1927 to 1932 he studied art in Paris, and took some small gardening jobs in France.

He began his professional career with projects in Rutland (1928), and chateaux in France at Melun (1930) and Boussy-Saint-Antoine (1932). On his return to the UK, Page was employed by the landscape architect Richard Sudell, and he began remodelling the gardens at Longleat – a work which would continue for many years. Between 1934 and 1938, he contributed articles to the periodical Landscape and Gardening. From 1935 to 1939 he worked in partnership with Geoffrey Jellicoe. Page and Jellicoe designed the landscape and building for the 'Caveman Restaurant' at Cheddar Gorge on the Longleat estate in Somerset, and worked at the Royal Lodge, Windsor; Ditchley Park, Oxfordshire; Holme House, Regent's Park, London; Broadway in the Cotswolds; and Charterhouse school. During this period, Page also worked at Leeds Castle, Kent (1936 and later); château Le Vert-Bois in France (1937); château de la Hulpe, Belgium (1937) and château de Mivoisin, France (1937 – 1950s).

During World War II, Page served in the UK's Political Warfare Department in France, the United States, Egypt and Sri Lanka.

After the war, Page went on to design gardens in Europe and the United States. His clients included:

- Prince Edward, Duke of Windsor and the Duchess of Windsor
- Count Sanminiatelli San Liberato
- King Leopold III of Belgium
- Susana Walton, wife of Sir William Walton
- Babe Paley and William S. Paley
- Oscar de la Renta
- Marcel Boussac
- Olive, Lady Baillie
- PepsiCo
- Baron and Baroness Thierry Van Zuylen van Nievelt
- Frick Museum

His works include the National Capitol Columns in Washington's United States National Arboretum and the Tenuta di San Liberato, Bracciano near Rome.

In 1947, Page married Lida Gurdjieff, a niece of the spiritual teacher G. I. Gurdjieff, and together they had one son, David. They divorced in 1954. In 1954, Page married Mme Vera Milanova Daumal, widow of the poet René Daumal and former wife of the poet Hendrick Kramer. She died in 1962.

Page's autobiography, The Education of a Gardener, was published in 1962.

Page died on 4 January 1985 in London and was buried in an unmarked grave in Badminton, Gloucestershire.

== Spiritual interests ==
Page was an aficionado of the mystics George Gurdjieff and P. D. Ouspensky, whose views inspired part of his approach to gardening.

In an interview by Christopher Woodward in The Telegraph, Page's niece, Vanessa showed Woodward some of the "treasured fragments" of her uncle's life, including a pamphlet on medicinal herbs by the writer and thinker, Idries Shah who, she explained, was a teacher in the Sufi mystical tradition, and who became "Page's spiritual mentor in Sixties London."
