= USS Liberator =

USS Liberator may refer to:

- USS Liberator (1826) was a 44-gun frigate built in 1826 and later renamed Hudson
- USS Liberator (1918) was an animal transport, launched 24 March 1918 and sold in 1933
- USS Liberator (AMc-87) was a coastal minesweeper launched 6 September 1941 and placed out of service 3 May 1945

== See also ==
- Liberator (disambiguation)
