= Luciano de Liberato =

Italian painter (born 1947)

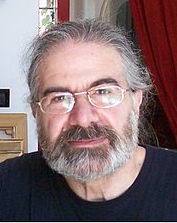
- Liberato in 2010
- Born: 6 September 1947 (age 78); Chieti, Italy
- Known for: Painting
- Notable work: Red 2003 Acrylic on Canvas, Lincoln Center Festival, New York City
- Movement: Abstract
- Awards: Mantua, Lubiam Prize

Luciano de Liberato (born 6 September 1947) is an Italian painter.

== Career ==
Liberato was born on 6 September 1947. began working in art in 1975, immediately attracting a lot of interest among the most important Italian art critics and historians (Filiberto Menna, Maurizio Fagiolo dell'Arco, Enrico Crispolti, Marcello Venturoli, Lorenza Trucchi, Gabriele Simongini). He was considered a young master and one of the great Italian colourist painting.

Protagonist in the 1980s in European painting, De Liberato has had more than fifty solo exhibitions, including two in the prestigious "Art Basel", in 1983 and 1984. Since 1990, he has worked in his studio in the Italian province. All his work is created through research cycles.

In 2011, he was invited to the Italian Pavilion (Abruzzo) of the Venice Biennale. In 2012, one of his works, RED, was chosen as an image of the Lincoln Center Festival in New York City, which gave to his work global renown.

In 2011, he decided to end all links with Italian galleries and has worked exclusively for international outlets.

== Solo exhibitions selection ==
- 1978, Rome, Gallery Artivisive, curators Maurizio Fagiolo dell'Arco and Filiberto Menna
- 1983, Basel, International Art Fair Art Basel (solo show Artivisive Gallery, Rome)
- 1983, Bologna, Art Fair, (solo show Artivisive Gallery, Rome)
- 1984, Basel, International Art Fair (solo show Artivisive Gallery, Rome) Art Basel
- 1984, Rennes, Maison de la Culture, Galerie Andrè Malraux
- 1983/1988, Rome, Gallery Artivisive of Sylvia Franchi (solo show Artivisive Gallery, Rome)
- 1994, Bologna, Art Fair, (solo show Artivisive Gallery, Rome)
- 1994, Rome, Gallery La Borgognona, retrospective exhibition
- 1999, Milan, Bocconi University
- 2000, Pescara, Theater Gabriele D'Annunzio
- 2001, Cortina d'Ampezzo, Spazio Cultura "Nuovi itinerari" curator Milena Milani
- 2003/2002/2001/2000/1999, Rome, Andrè Gallery, Via Giulia
- 2011, Cesena, Ridotto Palace, Modern Art Gallery, Anthology
- 2012, New York City, Lincoln Center

== Institutional group exhibitions ==
- 1975, Francavilla al Mare, XXIX Michetti Prize
- 1976, Francavilla al Mare, XXX Michetti Prize
- 1977, Francavilla al Mare, XXXI Michetti Prize
- 1980, National Bolaffi Catalog, volume II, Segnalati per la pittura
- 1983, Francavilla al Mare, XXXVI Michetti Prize
- 1987, Comune di Pescara
- 1987, L'Aquila Alternative Attuali, edition by Enrico Crispolti
- 1998, Artivisive in progress, Rome, Art History, curators Domenico Amoroso, Mirella Bentivoglio, Fabrizio Crisafulli, Ed. Christengraf
- 1999, Giuseppe Rosato, Quei giovani amici pittori edition by Nocciano museum, essays
- 2002, Termoli Prize
- 2011, Sassoferrato, 61^ International Art Exhibition G. B. Salvi, Mostra
- 2011, Pescara, Aurum Museum, Italy Pavilion, Venice Biennale
- 2013, XLVI Prize Vasto
- 2015, L'Aquila, Fibbioni Palace, The Making of, artists at work in tv

== Gallery ==
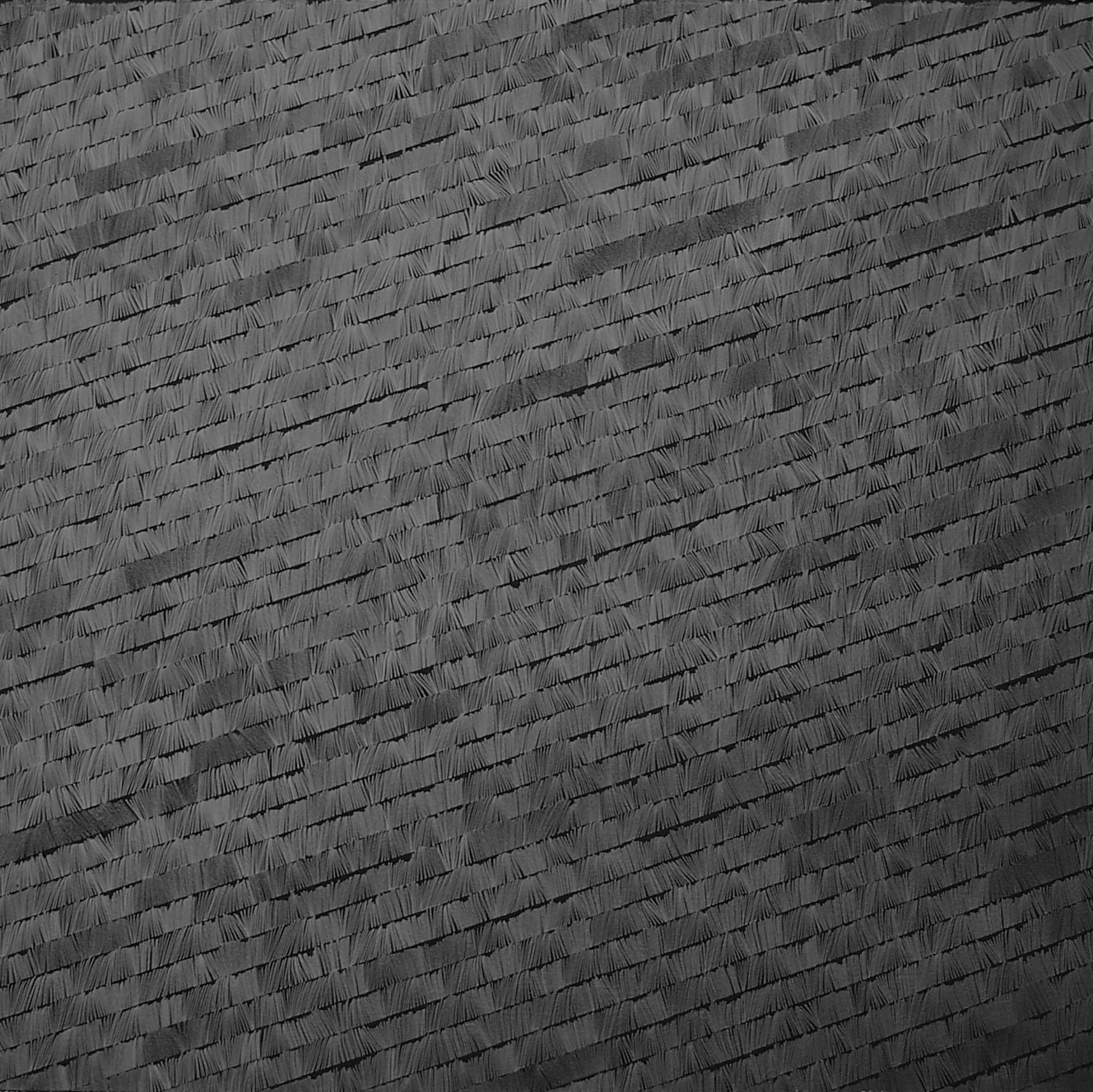
1977 – Page 3

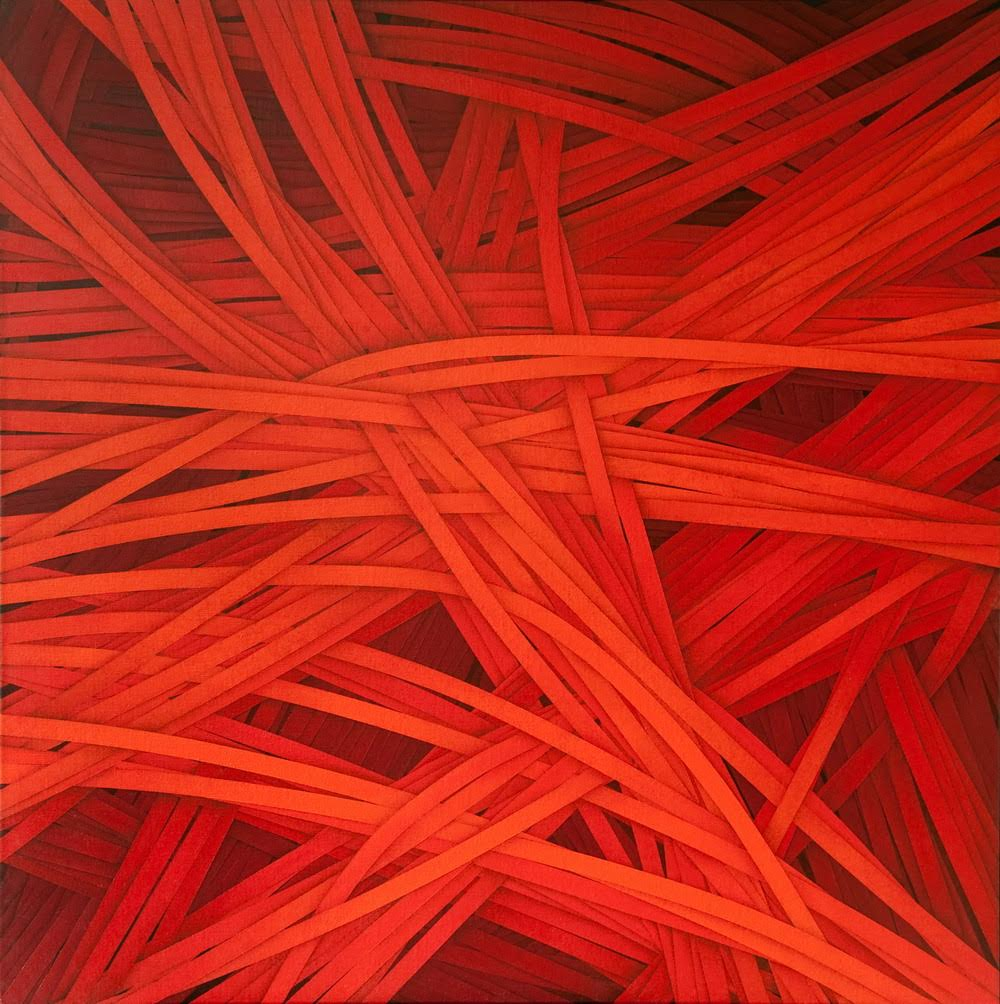
2003 – Red

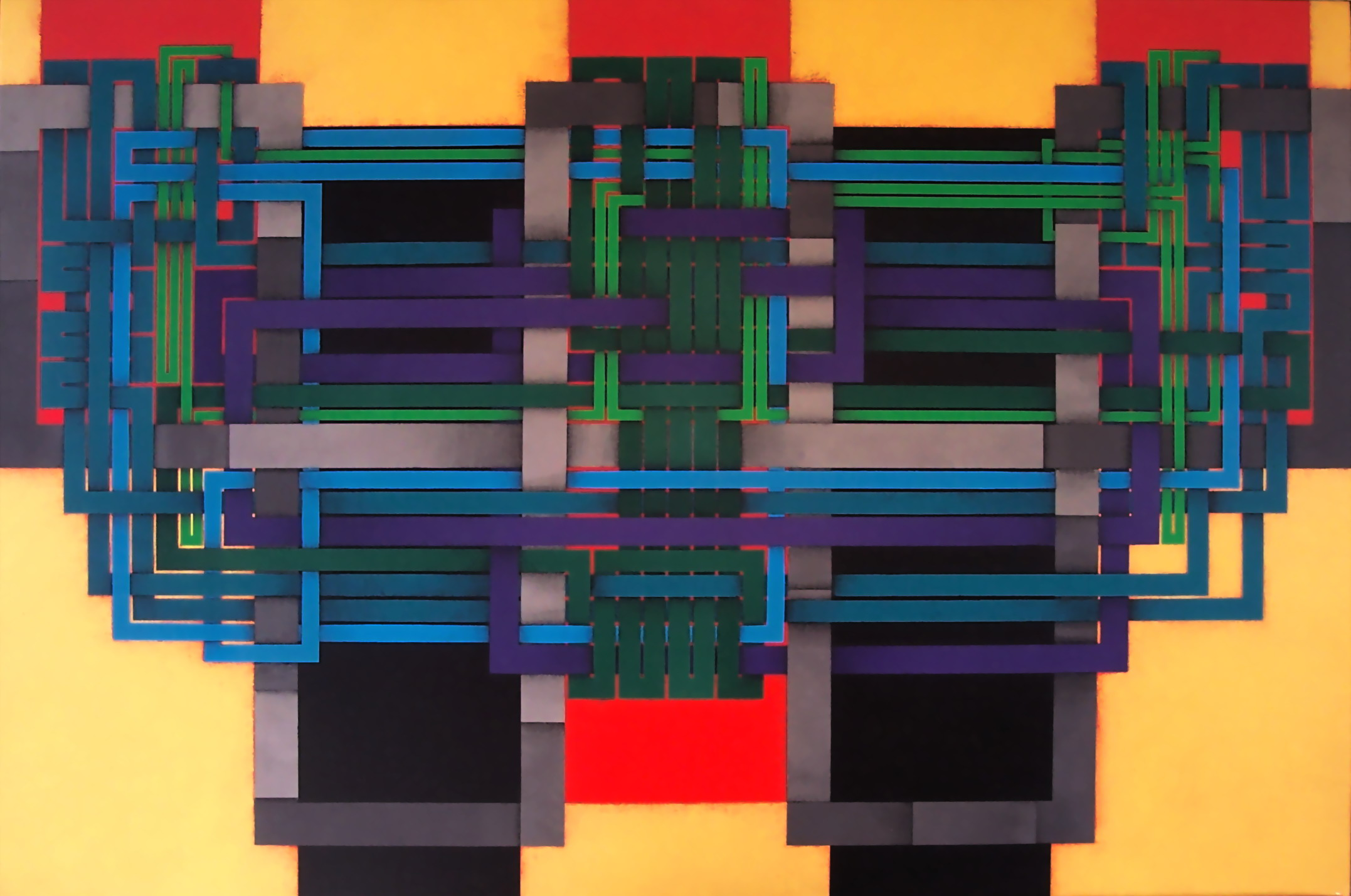
2008 – Robot

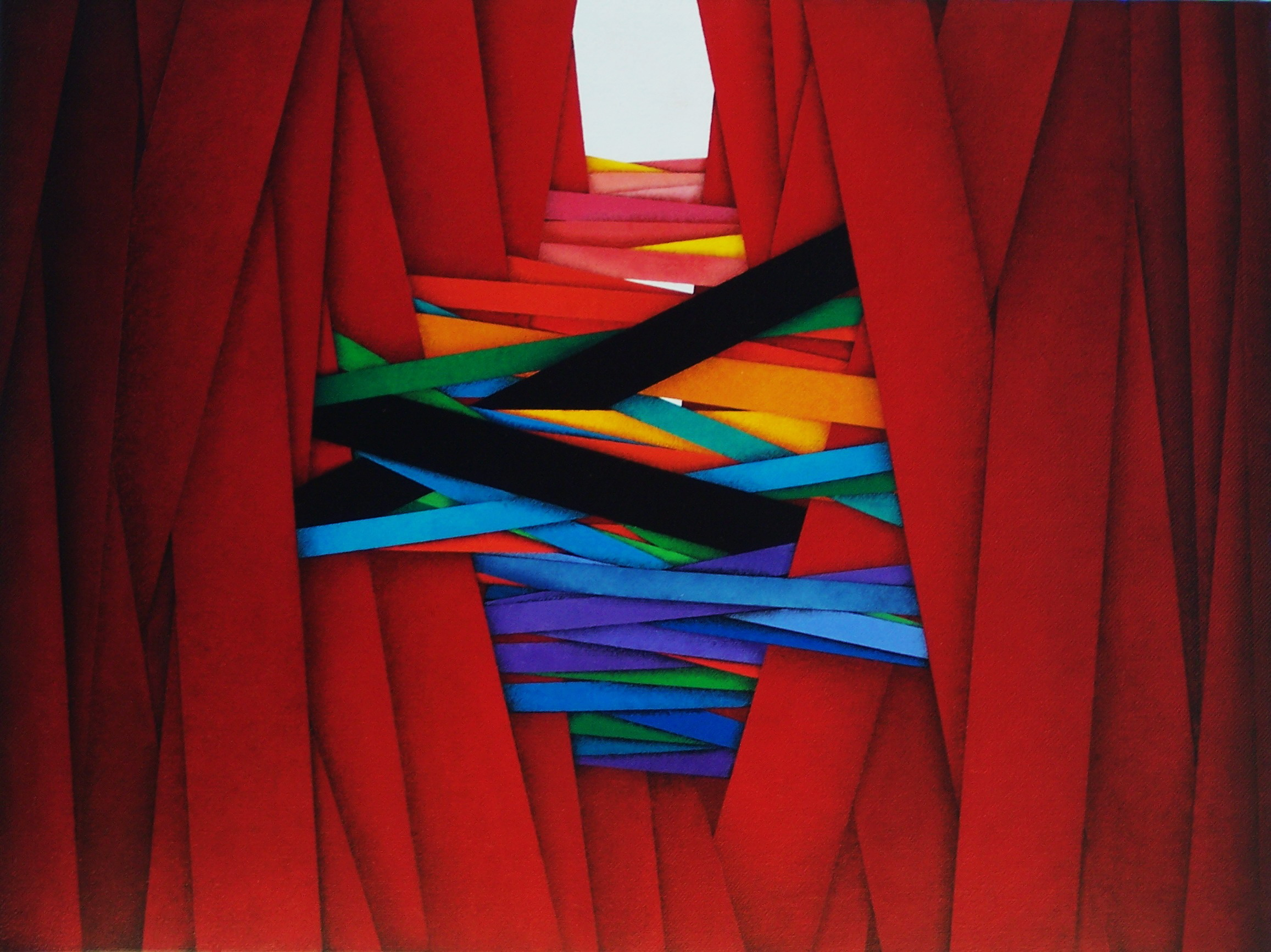
2014 – Theater

== See also ==
- Contemporary art

== Bibliography ==
- 1983, L'immagine diversa. edition by Fondazione Michetti, Marcello Venturoli
- 1987, L'Aquila, alternative attuali", edition by Enrico Crispolti
- 1999, Quei giovani amici pittori, edition by Arts Museum Nocciano, Giuseppe Rosato, "De Liberato il solitario"
- 2000, Artisti abruzzesi dal Medioevo ai giorni nostri, edition by Regione Abruzzo, Università degli Studi "Gabriele d'Annunzio", Maria Agnifili
- 2008, Gabriele Simongini, Se il pennello dialoga con il mouse, Terzocchio, n°5, edition by Ulisse Editore
- 2011, 61^ Rassegna Premio Salvi, La vertigine della visione, Comune di Sassoferrato
