= Alívio Imediato =

Live album by Engenheiros do Hawaii
- Released: 1989
- Genre: Rock
- Length: 55:45
- Label: BMG/RCA

Alívio Imediato (English: "Immediate Relief") is the first live album by Brazilian Rock band Engenheiros do Hawaii, released in 1989. Recorded live at Canecão, at Rio de Janeiro, in July 1989, the album brings great hits like A Revolta dos Dândis ( the two parts), Infinite Highway , Infinita Highway, Toda Forma de Poder e Somos Quem Podemos Ser.

== Track listing ==
1. "Nau à Deriva" 3:30
2. "Alívio Imediato" 3:44
3. "A Revolta dos Dândis (Parte 1)" 6:38
4. "A Revolta dos Dândis (Parte 2)" 4:00
5. "Infinite Highway" 7:23
6. "A Verdade a Ver Navios" 1:06
7. "Toda Forma de Poder" 4:28
8. "Terra de Gigantes" 5:47
9. "Somos Quem Podemos Ser" 3:05
10. "Ouça o que Eu Digo: Não Ouça Ninguém" 4:19
11. "Longe Demais das Capitais" 6:31

== Singles ==
- Alívio Imediato
- Nau à Deriva

== Personnel ==
- Humberto Gessinger: Voice, bass and electric guitar
- Augusto Licks: Electric guitar, guitar, keyboards and vocals
- Carlos Maltz: Drums
