= Gabriele Simongini =

Italian art historian and art critic (born 1963)

Gabriele Simongini (born 1963 in Rome) is an Italian art historian and art critic. Simongini is a professor at the Accademia di Belle Arti di Roma. Art critic of the newspaper Il Tempo and essayist. In particular deals with research in Italian abstract art.

== Curator of art exhibitions ==
- "Arché Show, Bendini, Boille, Mariani, Turcato"L'Aquila Basilica di Santa Maria di Collemaggio 2011
- Salvi G.B Prize Edition 61 Sassoferrato 2011
- Vertical Thinking Roma, 2012
- Matteo Montani show "Andarsene" Andersen Museum, Roma 2014
- Il Tempo del Futurismo, Galleria Nazionale di Arte Moderna GNAM, Roma 2 dicembre 2024 – 27 aprile 2025

== Books and essays ==
- Afro, artista mediterraneo. Le tecniche e i progetti (1948–1975).
- Catalogo della mostra (Chieti, 5 luglio-15 ottobre 2008)
- Luciano de Liberato, Se il pennello dialoga con il mouse, Terzocchio, n°5, 2008
- Marcello Mariani 1957–2007. La via pittorica al sacro.
- Guelfo, 2007
- Le visioni purificatorie nella pittura di Gaetano Memmo 2006
- Martín Riwnyj, Ombre di luce, carne fatta d'anima.(Temi d'arte contemporanea) 2005
- Astrattismo italiano. Incontri con quindici artisti (I quaderni della quadriennale. Nuova serie), 2005
- Confronti da museo. Kiki Fleming, Angela Pellicanò. Tra atmosfere e morfologie del colore, Bargellini museum 2005
- Quadriennale Anteprima Torino, 2004
- Art Club. 1945–1964. La linea astratta, 1998
- Bruno Chersicla. Sculture, 1995
- Piero Dorazio. La fantasia dell'arte nella vita moderna. Opere recenti, 1992
- Bruno Gorgone (Arte e artisti liguri), 1992
- Paolo Consorti. Primordiale

== Honors ==
- Margutta Prize, Roma 2002
