= Ingra Lyberato =

Brazilian actress (born 1966)

Ingra Liberato
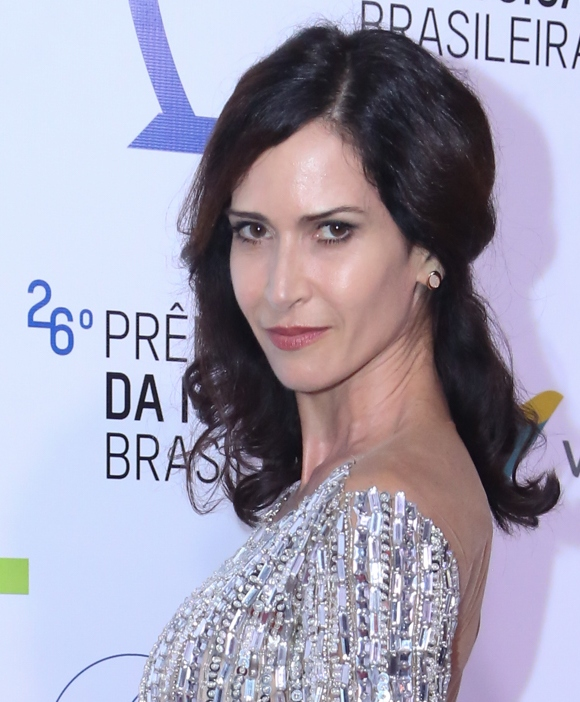
- In 2015, at the ceremony of delivery of the 26th Prêmio da Música Brasileira
- Born: Ingra de Souza Liberato; September 21, 1966 (age 59); Salvador, Bahia, Brazil
- Other names: Ingra Liberato
- Occupation: Actress
- Spouse: Jayme Monjardim (m. 1990; div. 1995) Duca Leindecker (m. 2001; div. 2012)
- Children: 1
- Family: Alba de Souza Liberato (mother); Francisco Liberato de Mattos (father); Candida Luz Liberato da Trindade (younger sister); Flor Violeta Liberato Bartilotti (younger sister); João Riso Souza Liberato de Mattos (younger brother); Timoteo Souza Liberato de Mattos (younger brother)

Ingra de Souza Liberato (born September 21, 1966) is a Brazilian actress. From 2016 she began to sing as Ingra Lyberato.

== Career ==
Ingra de Souza Liberato was born in Salvador, Bahia, the daughter of filmmakers. She had her debut in cinema at the age of 7, playing the role of a mermaid in the short film Ementário (1973), directed by her father Chico Liberato and scripted by her mother Alba Liberato.

She worked in telenovelas and was highly successful in the former Rede Manchete, as Pantanal, and A História de Ana Raio e Zé Trovão, then moved to Rede Globo.

In 2002, she moved to Porto Alegre. She was married for five years to director Jayme Monjardim and for eleven years to musician Duca Leindecker, of the band Cidadão Quem and Pouca Vogal, with whom she has a son, Guilherme (2003).

In 2007, she received the Kikito award in the category best actress for her performance in the film Valsa para Bruno Stein Festival de Gramado.

In 2016, she began to create and script documentary series and write her first book, O Medo do Sucesso, edited by L&PM, where she relates the successes and mistakes of her artistic career.

== Filmography ==
=== Television ===
Year	Title	Role	Notes
1989	Pacto de Sangue		Support cast
1989	Tieta	Tonha (young)	Episode: "August 14, 1989"
1989	Top Model	Model at Covery's parades	Support cast
1990	Pantanal	Madeleine (young)	Episodes: March 28–April 2, 1990
1990	O Canto das Sereias	Teoxíope	
1990	A História de Ana Raio e Zé Trovão	Ana Raio	
1994	Quatro por Quatro	Rosa	Episodes: "October 24–29, 1994"
1995	Decadência	Rafaela Couto Neves	
1996	Você Decide		Episode: "Véu de Noiva"
1997	A Indomada	Paraguaia	
1999	Louca Paixão	Soninha 38	
2002	O Clone	Amina	
2004	Segredo	Isabel	
2005	Essas Mulheres	Marli Lemos	
2008	Os Mutantes - Caminhos do Coração	Queen Sibila	Special participation
2009	Parada 90	Teca	
2011	Fora do Ar	Leila Dias	
2012	A Vida da Gente	Producer	Episode: "February 22, 2012"
2012	Balacobaco	Celina Fortunato Corrêa	
2014	Oxigênio	Marta	
2015	Kalanga: Cidade das Bicicletas	Helena / Lúcia	
2017	Perrengue	Paloma Prado	
2018	Segundo Sol	Fatima Garcia	
2019	Chuteira Preta	Carmen	
2021	Gênesis	Zilpa	

=== Film ===
Year	Title	Role	Notes
1973	Ementário	Mermaid	
1997	O Cangaceiro	Olívia	
1999	Dois Córregos	Teresa	
2000	Eu Não Conhecia Tururu	Isabel	
2000	Você Sabe Quem		Short film
2001	3 Histórias da Bahia	Posted Devil	
2001	Sonhos Tropicais	Emília	
2001	Cine Paixão		Short film
2003	O General	Ballerina	
2005	As Vidas de Maria	Maria	
2007	Valsa para Bruno Stein	Valéria	
2007	Chá de Frutas Vermelhas		Short film
2008	Sonho Lúcido	Various characters	Short film
2010	A Casa Verde	Secretary	
2011	O Carteiro	Natalina	
2011	Contos Gauchescos		
2013	Ensaio	Ana	
2014	Ritos de Passagem	Maria Bonita (voice)	
2014	Catarse	Lúcia	Short film
2015	#garotas: O Filme	Suzana	
2015	Happily Married	Ceremonialist	Cameo
2016	Going to Brazil	Brigitte	
2018	A Espera de Liz	Diana	
