= Duca Leindecker =

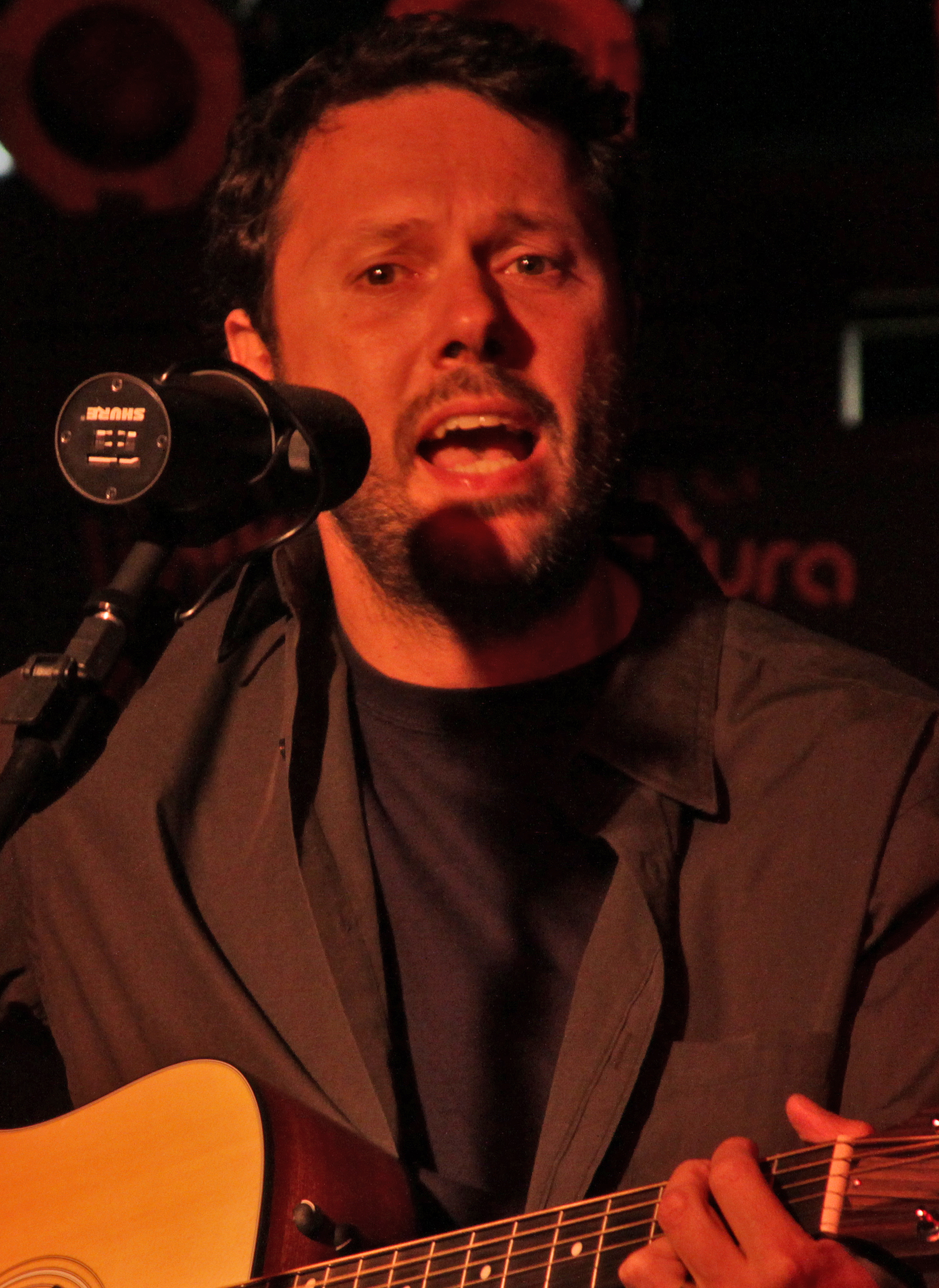

Background information
- Born: Eduardo Tavares Leindecker; April 5, 1970 (age 56); Porto Alegre, Rio Grande do Sul, Brazil
- Genre: Rock
- Occupations: Musician, composer, writer
- Instruments: Vocals, guitar, bass, accordion
- Years active: 1987–present
- Labels: Som Livre; Polygram; Zoom Records; Warner Music; Orbeat Music; OpenArt Play
- Spouse: Manuela d'Ávila (m. 2012)
- Website: Official website

Duca Leindecker (born April 5, 1970) is a Brazilian singer, composer, multi-instrumentalist and writer, leader of the band Cidadão Quem. From 2008 to 2012 he formed Pouca Vogal, with Humberto Gessinger.

== Personal life ==
Born in Porto Alegre in 1970, he began playing various instruments, and when he was seventeen years old he recorded his first solo album and, in the early 1990s, was invited by Bob Dylan to open his shows in Brazil. He recorded seven CDs with the Cidadão Quem group and participated to Rock in Rio III. He is the author of themes for telenovelas.

From 2008 to 2012 Duca dedicated himself to the duo Pouca Vogal, with Humberto Gessinger, leading to the release of two albums. In 2015 he released his first solo DVD, Plano Aberto, and in 2018 he launched Download Armas.

=== Private life ===
From 2001 to 2012 he was married to actress Ingra Liberato, with whom he had his first child, Guilherme, born on July 11, 2003, in Rio de Janeiro. In the same year of their separation, he married the journalist and politician Manuela d'Ávila. The couple's daughter, Laura, was born on August 28, 2015, in Porto Alegre.

== Discography ==
=== Bandaliera ===
- Nosso Lado Animal (1987)
- Ao Vivo (1991)

=== Solo ===
- Duca Leindecker (1988)
- Voz, Violão e Batucada (2013)
- Plano Aberto (2015)
- Baixar Armas (2018)

=== Cidadão Quem ===
- Outras Caras (1993)
- A lente azul (1996)
- Spermatozoon (1999)
- Soma (2000)
- Girassóis da Rússia (2002)
- Acústico no Theatro São Pedro (2004)
- 7 (2007)

=== Pouca Vogal ===
- Pouca Vogal: Gessinger + Leindecker (2008)
- Ao Vivo Em Porto Alegre (2009)

== Books ==
Duca Leindecker wrote:

- A casa da esquina (1999)
- A favor do vento (2002)
- O menino que pintava sonhos (2013)
