= Chuteira Preta =

Brazilian crime drama web television series

- Genre: Drama
- Directed by: Paulo Nascimento
- Starring: Márcio Kieling; Nuno Leal Maia; Jussara Brozoza; Allan Souza Lima; Karin Roepke; Nicola Siri
- Country of origin: Brazil
- Original language: Portuguese
- No. of seasons: 1
- No. of episodes: 13

Production
- Executive producers: Marilaine Costa; Paulo Nascimento
- Cinematography: Renato Falcão
- Editor: Marcio Papel
- Production company: Accorde Filmes

Original release
- Network: Prime Box Brazil
- Release: July 13, 2019 – present

Chuteira Preta is a Brazilian drama television series written and directed by Paulo Nascimento. The first season consists of 13 episodes and premiered on Prime Box Brazil on July 13, 2019.

== Premise ==
Exposing the association football underworld that causes career decline and financial losses. The series follows the story of the soccer player Kadu (Márcio Kieling). After a successful career in teams from Portugal and Spain, the athlete has a disastrous return to Brazilian football. He decides to return to his roots in periphery soccer, when he was not a professional and used to play soccer barefoot.

== Cast ==
- Márcio Kieling as Kadu
- Nuno Leal Maia as Jair
- Jussara Brozoza as Nice
- Allan Souza Lima as Carniça
- Karin Roepke as Flávia
- Nicola Siri as Genaro
- José Victor Castiel as Dr. Sangaletti
- Gabrielle Fleck as Carol
- Edna Lima as Patty
- Kadu Moliterno as Cedenir
- Vaneza Oliveira as Gisa
- Maria Zilda Bethlem as Dolores Castanho
- Ingra Lyberato as Carmen

== Production ==
=== Filming ===
The series was filmed for seven weeks, between March and April 2018, around the Metropolitan area of Porto Alegre. In total, there were 130 sets and 50 different locations, including the Estádio Beira-Rio, periphery soccer fields, villages and the Port of Porto Alegre.
