= Pouca Vogal =

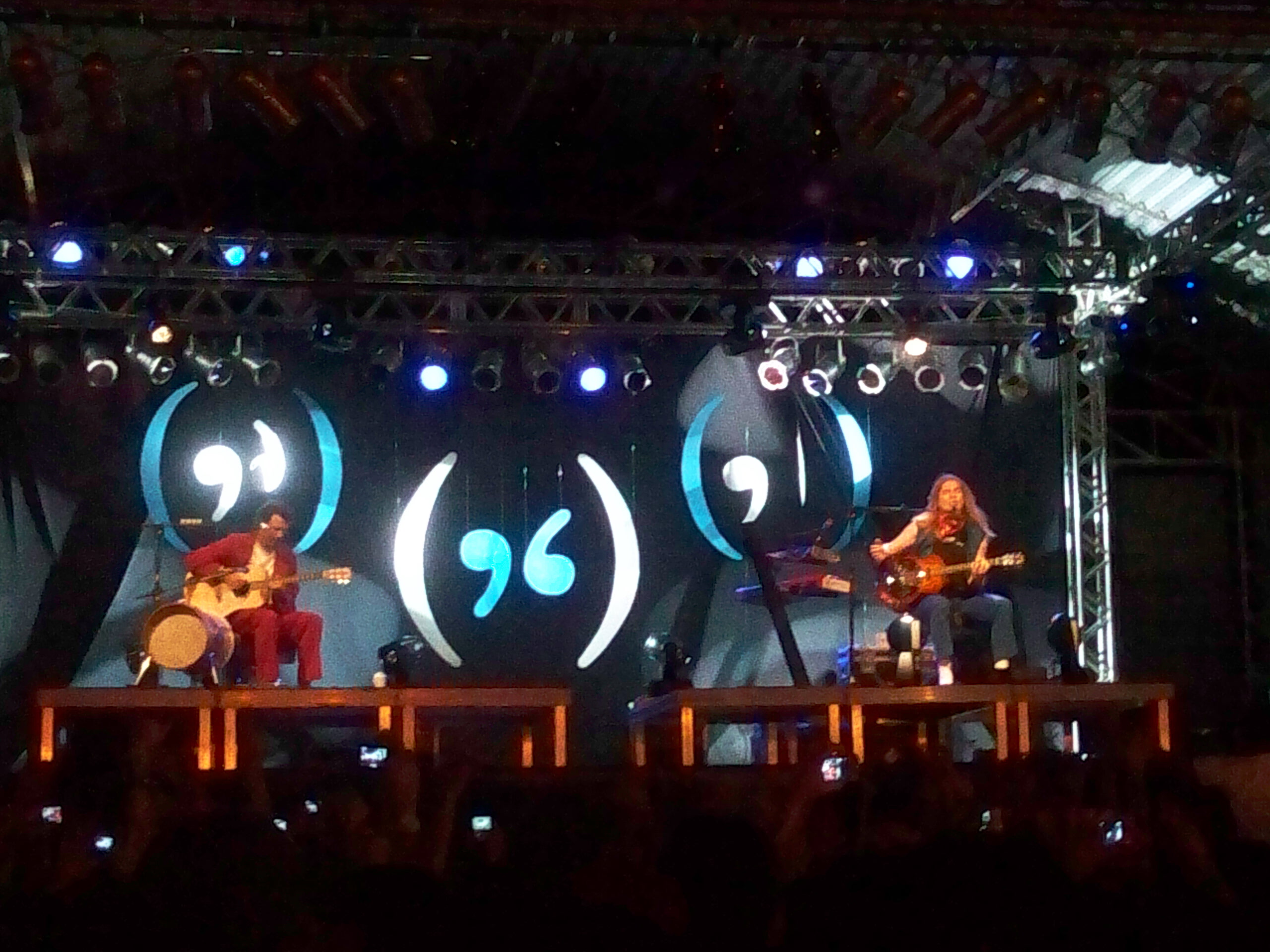
- Leindecker & Gessinger(live concert in 2011)

Background information
- Origin: Porto Alegre, Rio Grande do Sul, Brazil
- Genres: Brazilian rock, folk, MPB
- Years active: 2008–2012
- Labels: Independent, Som Livre
- Members: Humberto Gessinger; Duca Leindecker
- Website: www.poucavogal.com.br

Pouca Vogal ("Few Vowels" in English) is a side project created by Brazilian rock singers Duca Leindecker (Leader and guitarist of the band Cidadão Quem and Humberto Gessinger (Leader and bassist of the group Engenheiros do Hawaii).

== History ==
=== Early years ===
Friends since the late '80s, and Humberto Gessinger and Duca Leindecker are band-leaders of two of the biggest bands in the style known as Rock gaúcho, namely, Engenheiros do Hawaii and Cidadão Quem.

In 2008, both bands ended their tours of albums (Novos Horizontes, acoustic album released by the Engenheiros do Hawaii in 2007, and 7, studio album Cidadão Quem, released in 2006), interrupting the activities of the bands and making possible the realization of the project, has long envisioned by the singers.

=== Pouca Vogal - Gessinger + Leindecker (2008–09) ===
The duo has recorded eight songs in electro-acoustic arrangements, which were released on the official website of the group and gave rise to album Pouca Vogal - Gessinger + Leindecker. After the recording of them, the duo has been touring several cities in Brazil.

=== Ao Vivo em Porto Alegre (2009–present) ===
In March 2009, the duo recorded the CD, DVD and Blu-ray Ao Vivo em Porto Alegre in the theater of CIEE, the capital of Porto Alegre. The show brings together music of Engenheiros do Hawaii and the Cidadão Quem, besides the songs that the pair wrote in 2008. Besides the songs, the DVD has the shares in Rio Grande do Sul PoA Pops orchestra, under the baton of Maestro Fernando Cordella, with arrangements by James Kreutzer, and bassist Luciano Leindecker (brother of Duca and bassist Cidadão Quem) playing the bass and an instrument created by him, called quince.

Recorded independently, there was an interval of nine months between its recording and its release through the label Som Livre (connected to the Globo).

== Band members ==
=== Current members ===
- Humberto Gessinger - lead vocals, classical guitar, viola caipira, harmonic, piano, percussion instrument, midi pedalboard, dobro
- Duca Leindecker - lead vocals, electric guitar, classical guitar, pandeirola, bass drum

=== Guest musicians ===
- Carlos Maltz - percussion instrument, lead vocals
- Luciano Leindecker - bass
- Borguetinho - sanfona

== Discography ==
Studio albums

- Pouca Vogal - Gessinger + Leindecker (2008)

Live albums

- Ao Vivo Em Porto Alegre (2009)
