= Giulio Liberati =

Italian footballer

Personal information
- Date of birth: 27 May 1913
- Place of birth: Rome, Italy
- Position: Midfielder

Senior career*
Years	Team	Apps	(Gls)
1933–1934	Roma	1	(0)
- * Club domestic league appearances and goals

Giulio Liberati (born May 27, 1913, in Rome) was an Italian professional football player.

He played one game in the 1933/34 Serie A season for A.S. Roma. He also played for Serie C sides G.S.F. Giovanni Grion Pola and M.A.T.E.R.

== See also ==
- Football in Italy
- List of football clubs in Italy
