= Liberato (singer) =

Italian singer and songwriter

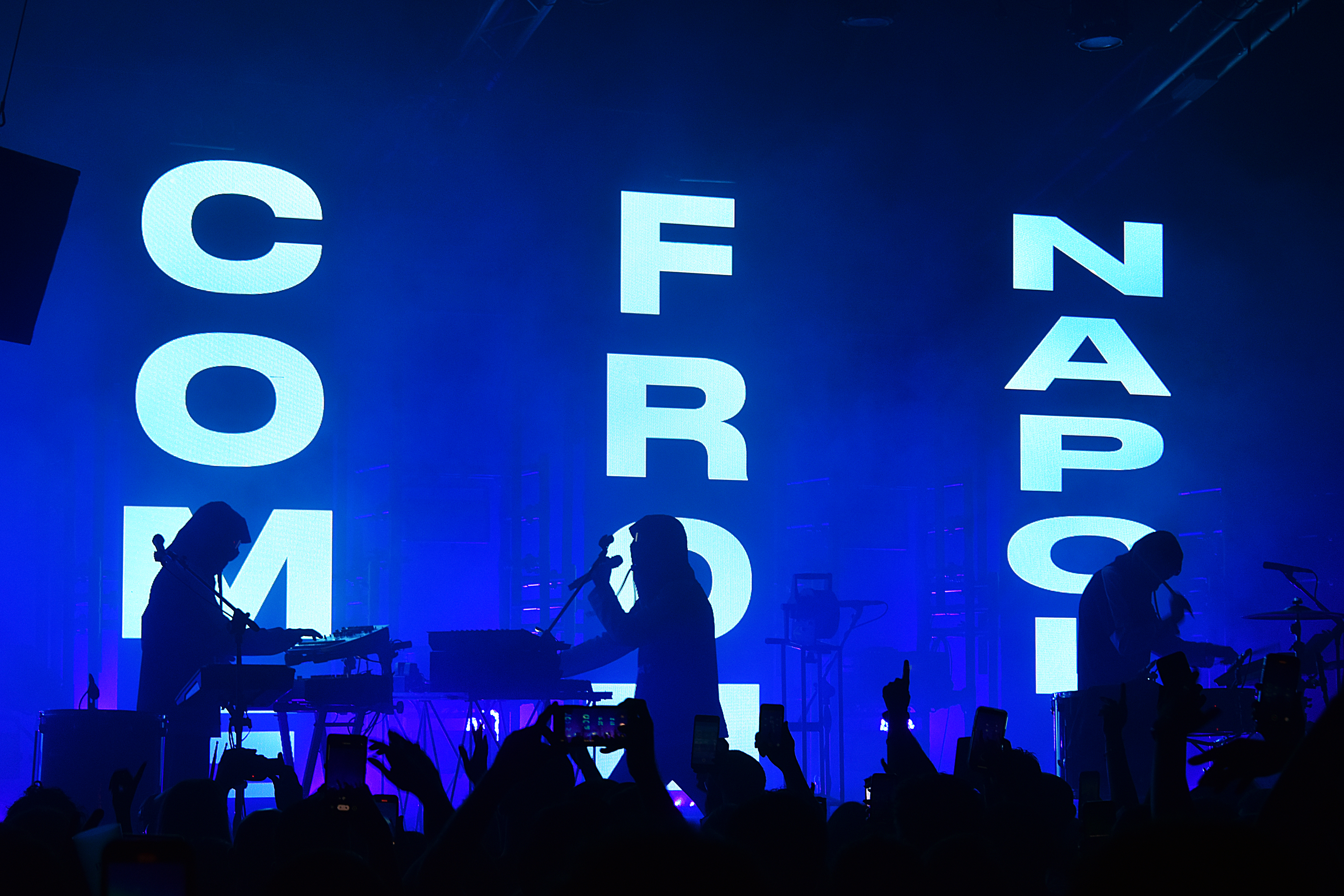
- LIBERATO in concert at the Fiore Verde Festival at the Cabaret Sauvage in Paris in 2023
- Occupations: Singer; songwriter
- Years active: 2017–present
- Musical career
- Genres: Alternative R&B; Canzone Napoletana
- Instruments: Vocals
- Website: liberato.bigcartel.com

Liberato (Neapolitan: [libeˈrɑːtə], Italian: [libeˈraːto]) is an Italian singer and songwriter whose identity is unknown. The main language of his lyrics is Neapolitan, although he tends to include words or entire sentences in Italian, English, French and Spanish.

== Career ==
Liberato's career began on February 14, 2017 with the release of his first single, "Nove maggio" on his YouTube channel. The next day the song was released in digital form on streaming platforms, enjoying some success amongst the specialised critic and the general public. On May 9, the singer's second single, "Tu t'e scurdat' and me", was released. It was released on digital platforms on May 17. With this music video for the first time the figure of Liberato himself appears. 2017 ends with the release, on 19 September on YouTube and three days later on music streaming services, of "Gaiola portafortuna".

The date of release of the video has a double symbolism, corresponding both to the holiday of San Gennaro, patron saint of Naples, and to the anniversary of the Castel Volturno massacre, when the Camorra killed six Italian-African immigrants.

On January 20, the video of "Me staje appennenn' amò" was released on YouTube, instead the release on digital streaming platforms occurred on June 12. Within the music video, particular emphasis is placed on the LGBTQ theme.

After months of absence from social networks, a few minutes after the end of May 9, 2019 Liberato published his first album, homonymously called Liberato, composed of eleven tracks including five unreleased plus "Gaiola", reworking in voice and piano version of the song "Gaiola portafortuna".

In addition to the unreleased songs of the album there is a series of videos in five episodes called CRV (Capri Rendez-Vous).

In 2020 he wrote and sang the soundtrack of the film Ultras, released on Netflix and in selected cinemas. On 23 March he released the album Ultras on streaming platforms, in which the songs that form the background to the homonymous film are collected. 3D (pseudonym of Robert Del Naja, member of the British collective Massive Attack) and Gaika also collaborate in the creation of the songs.

Subsequently Liberato announced a concert at the Mediolanum Forum in Milan on April 25, 2020, later adding another show on April 26 after the sold out tickets. However, due to the COVID-19 pandemic, both concerts were initially postponed and later moved to a single date scheduled for September 9, 2022 at San Siro.

On May 9, 2021, the single "E te veng 'a piglià" was released, followed on June 22 by "Chiagne ancora", a Ghali song on which Liberato collaborated vocally with J Lord.

On May 9, 2022 Liberato releases his second album Liberato II, consisting of six unreleased tracks plus a cover. For each track, as many music videos have been published on the artist's YouTube channel. A particular track to have a MV with actors is Partenope with the dancer Tonia Laterza and the actor Giacomo Rizzo, while the other 6 songs are accompanied with visuals.

On 20 July 2022 he held a free concert in Procida called "Miez 'o mare" (lit. 'in the middle of the sea').

== Identity ==
Precisely because of the artist's choice to remain anonymous, his personal life remains a mystery. In an exclusive e-mail interview, granted to the music magazine Rolling Stone, he only declared that he was born in Naples and that his name was Liberato, even if none of this news has ever been confirmed by authoritative third-party sources or official documentation.

The mystery surrounding his real identity is a distinctive trait of the figure of Liberato, appearing in public exclusively hooded, accompanied by an impersonator or concealed by a screen.

== Discography ==
=== Studio albums ===
List of albums, with selected chart positions and certifications
Title	Album details	Peak chart positions	Certifications
Title	Album details	ITA	Certifications
Liberato	Released: 9 May 2019; Label: Self-released; Formats: CD, digital download	5	FIMI: Platinum
Liberato II	Released: 9 May 2022; Label: Self-released; Formats: CD, digital download	10	FIMI: Gold
Liberato III	Released: 1 January 2025; Label: Self-released; Formats: CD, digital download	23	
Radio Liberato	Released: 9 May 2026; Label: Self-released; Formats: CD, digital download	29	

=== Soundtracks ===
- Ultras (2020)

=== Singles ===
==== As lead artist ====
List of singles as lead artist, with selected chart positions, showing year released and album name
Title	Year	Peak chart positions	Certifications	Album
Title	Year	ITA	Certifications	Album
"Nove maggio"	2017	85	FIMI: Platinum	Liberato
"Tu t'e scurdat' 'e me"	2017	71	FIMI: 2× Platinum	Liberato
"Gaiola portaforutna"	2017	—		Non-album single
"Me staje appennenn' amò"	2018	32	FIMI: 2× Platinum	Liberato
"Intostreet"	2018	67	FIMI: Gold	Liberato
"Je te voglio bene assaje"	2018	68	FIMI: Gold	Liberato
"We Come from Napoli"	2020	92		Ultras
"'O core nun tene padrone"	2020	65		Ultras
"E te veng' a piglià"	2021	47		Non-album singles
"'O DJ (Don't Give Up)"	2023	—		Non-album singles
"'O core nun tene padrone" (1926 mix)	2023	—		Non-album singles
"Lucia (Stay with Me)"	2024	40		Liberato III
"Viennarì"	2025	97		Non-album single
"—" denotes a single that did not chart or was not released.

==== As featured artist ====
- 2021 – "Chiagne ancora" (feat. Ghali & J Lord)
- 2021 – "Je 'o tteng e t'o ddòng'" (feat. Bawrut)
- 2024 – "Sbagli e te ne vai" (feat. Co'Sang)
- 2027 - ? (feat. Geolier)
- 2027 - ? (feat. Rosalía)
