= Engenheiros do Hawaii =

Brazilian rock band

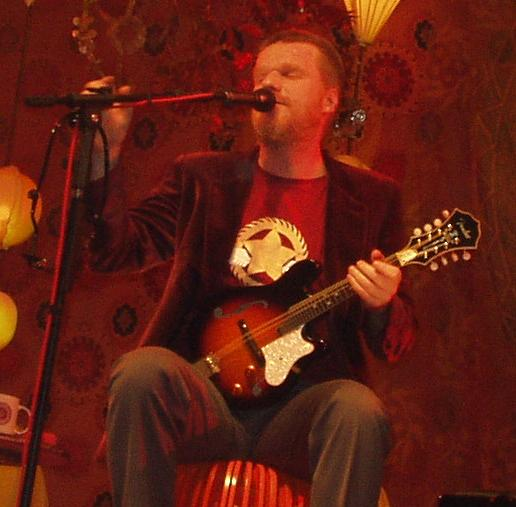

Background information
- Origin: Porto Alegre, Brazil
- Genres: Alternative rock; post-punk; new wave; progressive rock
- Years active: 1985–2008
- Labels: Universal Music, BMG
- Members: Humberto Gessinger; Gláucio Ayala; Fernando Aranha; Pedro Augusto
- Past members: Adal Fonseca; Augusto Licks; Bernardo Fonseca; Paulinho Galvão; Fernando Deluqui; Carlos Maltz; Marcelo Pitz; Ricardo Horn; Carlos Stein; Rodrigo Molina; Paolo Casarin; Luciano Granja; Lucio Dorfman

Engenheiros do Hawaii (English: "Engineers from Hawaii") was a Brazilian rock band formed in Porto Alegre in 1983 that achieved great popularity with their ironic, critically charged songs with heavily semantic lyrics often relying on wordplays. The vocalist and bassist Humberto Gessinger was the only member present since the original lineup.

== History ==
=== First years in the south ===
Three architecture college students from UFRGS, Humberto Gessinger (vocal and guitar), Carlos Maltz (drums) and Marcelo Pitz (bass) decided to form a band for a show in a college festival. That performance brought invitations to do new shows and after some gigs in alternative venues in Porto Alegre and a series along Rio Grande do Sul's country region, the Engenheiros do Hawaii recorded their first solo album: Longe Demais das Capitais in 1986. The record's musical direction pointed towards a more New Wave sound, very close to the sound of bands like The Police and Os Paralamas do Sucesso. It includes the songs "Toda Forma de Poder" and "Sopa de Letrinhas".

Before they got around to recording the second album, Marcelo Pitz left the band. In his place was recruited the guitarist Augusto Licks, who had worked with Nei Lisboa, a known local musician. With Gessinger assuming the bass the Engenheiros released the album A Revolta dos Dândis in 1987. The band changed their sound, turning to a more Bob Dylan-ish, folk mood, with critical lyrics with literature quotes from philosophers such as Albert Camus and Jean-Paul Sartre. It brought the hits "Infinita Highway", "Terra de Gigantes", "Refrão de Bolero" and the title track, divided in two parts. By this time they had begun to play gigs to greater audiences in the center of the country, like the Alternativa Nativa festival, between 14 and 17 June 1987.

From this date, the Engenheiros filled halls and stadia all over Brazil. The following album, Ouça o Que Eu Digo, Não Ouça Ninguém of 1988 can be seen as a natural succession from the previous one, due both to the album coverwork and the theme and style of its songs. Well-known songs from this album include "Somos Quem Podemos Ser", "Nunca Se Sabe", "Tribos & Tribunais" and "Variações Sobre o Mesmo Tema", the last one being a tribute to Pink Floyd, with its progressive mood and being split in three parts. This album also marked the time that the Engenheiros relocated from the city of Porto Alegre to Rio de Janeiro. With the new formation settled, the Engenheiros released Alívio Imediato, of 1989, their first live album. It showcased a retrospective of their main songs and the new ideas leading to a more electronic sound, present in the title track and in the song "Nau à Deriva".

=== Gessinger, Licks & Maltz ===
The following album, O Papa É Pop, from 1990 consolidated the band's change of sound. Fuelled by the success of "Era Um Garoto Que Como Eu Amava os Beatles e os Rolling Stones", a new recording of an old song from 1960s group Os Incríveis, this album tried out a progressive sound, with Licks's guitar solos and a more electronic base of keyboards and drums. He is the author of the songs "O Exército de um Homem Só", "Pra Ser Sincero", "Perfeita Simetria" and the title track. Acclaimed by the people and bashed by the critics, the Engenheiros do Hawaii left their mark in Rock in Rio II, earning praises from even The New York Times. The following year would see the band's next release, Várias Variáveis, that failed to repeat its predecessor's success, even with songs well-known to fans like "Piano Bar", "Muros & Grades" and "Herdeiro da Pampa Pobre", cover version from a Gaúcho da Fronteira song.

In 1992, a brand-new album, Gessinger, Licks & Maltz. Their sound kept on mixing MPB, milonga and progressive elements, most noticeably in the tracks "Pampa no Walkman", "Ninguém = Ninguém" and "Parabólica", a song composed by Gessinger in homage to his daughter, Clara. Their follow-up release is a semi-acoustic album: Filmes de Guerra, Canções de Amor, from 1993, recorded live in Sala Cecília Meirelles, Rio de Janeiro. With acoustic guitars, percussion, piano and guesting the Brazilian Symphony Orchestra, scored by Wagner Tiso, old songs like "Muros & Grades" and "Crônica" and new works like "Mapas do Acaso" and "Realidade Virtual" sounded cooler and highlighted the quality of Gessinger's songwriting.

=== Difficult times ===
The year 1993 also marked the first tours to Japan and the United States. Unfortunately, towards the end of this year, an internal rift resulted in Augusto Licks leaving the band. There began a long legal dispute over the ownership of the name “Engenheiros do Hawaii," with Gessinger and Maltz finally winning control of the name. The next step was to rebuild the Engenheiros, with the addition of a guitarist, Ricardo Horn. Afterwards two new members joined the band - Paolo Casarin (accordion and keyboards) and another guitarist Fernando Deluqui (ex-RPM). After two years without recording, Engenheiros released Simples de Coração, towards the end of 1995. The sound was heavier, with a regional flavour given to it by the accordion of Casarin. Standout tracks were "A Promessa", "Lance de Dados" and "Simples de Coração". Towards the end of this period, Maltz decided to leave the band, resulting in a new crisis in the band.

=== Gessinger Trio ===
Gessinger returned to Porto Alegre, and with two friends, Luciano Granja (guitar) and Adal Fonseca (drums), formed the band Gessinger Trio. Later, they produced the album Humberto Gessinger Trio in 1996. The key points of the disc cover Gessinger's early works, such as the songs "Vida Real", "O Preço" and "A Ferro e Fogo". In reality it is "an album by Engenheiros without the name Engenheiros do Hawaii", in Gessinger's words. They proved themselves the next year when Granja, Adal, and Gessinger re-assumed the name Engenheiros do Hawaii.

=== Return ===
For their 1997 album Minuano, which marked the return of Engenheiros, a new keyboardist, Lucio Dorfman, joined the band. The disc, which mixed regional influences and critical lyrics by Gessinger, combining the success of "A Montanha", as well as other songs such as "Nuvem" and "Alucinação", a cover of an old tune by MPB singer Belchior. The follow-up, Tchau Radar!, from 1999, showed a more mature Engenheiros, with tunes considered beautiful by fans, like "Eu Que Não Amo Você" and "3 x 4", and two covers: "Negro Amor", a version of Bob Dylan's It's All Over Now, Baby Blue, and "A Cruzada". Afterwards, they released their third live recording, and the twelfth album of their career: 10.000 Destinos ao Vivo.

Then, Gessinger went back of the back catalogue of the band and wrote new songs, amongst them covers of "Rádio Pirata" and "Quando o Carnaval Chegar". Renato Borghetti was prominent in new versions of two hits: "Toda Forma de Poder" and "Refrão de Bolero". Some months after their performance in Rock in Rio III, Lucio, Adal and Luciano left the band to form Massa Crítica, changing once again the formation of Engenheiros.

=== Surfando Karmas & DNA and Dançando no Campo Minado ===
After this parting, Lucio, Adal and Luciano were replaced by Paulinho Galvão (rhythm guitar), Bernardo Fonseca (bass) and Gláucio Ayala (drums). The sound is cleaner, but also a bit heavier. In 2002, a more nostalgic phase of the band was started, with the release of Surfando Karmas & DNA, with the participation of ex-band members, especially Carlos Maltz on "E-stória". Standout tracks for this album include "Esportes Radicais" and "Terceira do Plural". The following album, Dançando no Campo Minado, from 2003, continued the theme: short tracks, heavy guitar and critical lyrics of Gessinger denouncing the perils of globalization, war and showing disillusionment with politics and ideology, the last one featuring contributions from Carlos Maltz. However, the most successful track of this album was catchy pop-rock theme "Até o Fim".

To commemorate the twentieth anniversary of the band in 2004, Engenheiros do Hawaii released a disc from an MTV Unplugged session. Special guests on this session were Fernando Aranha (acoustic guitar), Humberto Barros (Hammond organ) and Carlos Maltz, Gessinger presented new versions of classics like "Infinita Highway" and "O Papa é Pop". Other tracks are "Pose", with contributions from Clara, Gessinger's daughter, and songs from the Gessinger Trio era, which had already been incorporated to the EngHaw official material.

=== Unplugged tour ===
After the success of the unplugged DVD, the band, reformed by Humberto Gessinger, with the loss of the guitarist Paulinho Galvão who went on to other projects, carried on with new additions Fernando Aranha on strings, and the young musician Pedro Augusto on keyboards. Moving forward from 2006, the band has promised a new album sometime in the first quarter of 2007.

== Discography ==
=== Studio albums ===
- (1986) Longe Demais das Capitais
- (1987) A Revolta dos Dândis
- (1988) Ouça o Que Eu Digo, Não Ouça Ninguém
- (1990) O Papa É Pop
- (1991) Várias Variáveis
- (1992) Gessinger, Licks & Maltz
- (1995) Simples de Coração
- (1996) Humberto Gessinger Trio
- (1997) Minuano
- (1999) Tchau Radar!
- (2002) Surfando Karmas & DNA
- (2003) Dançando no Campo Minado

=== Live albums ===
- (1989) Alívio Imediato
- (1993) Filmes de Guerra, Canções de Amor
- (2000) 10 Mil Destinos
- (2004) Acústico MTV
- (2007) Novos Horizontes
