= Jefferson Lewis Edmonds =

American newspaper editor, political activist(1858 - 1914)

- Edmonds c. 1912
- Born: 1852; Virginia, U.S.
- Died: January 4, 1914 (aged 61–62); Los Angeles, California, U.S.
- Occupations: Editor, Real Estate
- Writing career
- Notable works: The Pasadena Searchlight, The Liberator (Los Angeles, CA)
- Website: www.jledmondsproject.com

Jefferson Lewis Edmonds (1852 – January 4, 1914) was an American farmer, real estate entrepreneur, newspaper editor, and political activist who is most well known as the owner and editor of the Liberator, an early-twentieth-century Los Angeles news-magazine for the African American community.

== Early life ==
=== Birth ===
Jefferson Lewis Edmonds was born enslaved on the Edmunds family's plantation in Virginia. After emancipation he moved to Columbus, Mississippi, where he pursued an education in a series “freedmen’s schools.” In 1875, at the age of 23, Edmonds began teaching in the black schools of Mississippi and continued this work until the late 1880s. He also bought a small farm in Northern Mississippi about thirty five miles south of Memphis, Tennessee and was active in local politics.

=== Testimony for the United States Senate Select Committee ===
Even during Reconstruction participation in the political system was dangerous for African Americans. Undeterred, Edmonds continued to vote though he was attacked and threatened by white mobs during the Election of 1875, and was witness to violence, intimidation, and murder. In June 1876, Edmonds testified before the United States Senate Select Committee to Inquire into the Mississippi Election of 1875 about his being beaten and intimidated by a mob:

I went around a great deal in the county in the Republican canvass, and I spoke, I think, a time or two in the last campaign. I continued to go to them until I was attacked in the streets of West Point one day by a man by the name of McCeachin. He attacked me on the street. There was four or five with him, and asked why was I going around speaking, and what did I have to do with it. I told him just because I belonged to the party. He told me, “I want you to stop and have no more to do with it, or they would kill me”—just that way. I promised that I would not have anything more to do with it. They had pistols in their hands, and were armed, and I had to make the promise to save my life; and then they let me loose. I went to the clerk employed by a man by the name of Vincent Petty. I went there and they came in there and attacked me again, and told me, in the presence of Petty and his clerk, if I ever went around making speeches anywhere in that county to put on my burying-clothes, as I would never come back to West Point any more.

Edmonds also told the Committee of a murder he’d witnessed:

They had a parade at West Point. I was standing on the corner talking and some of the colored men came up, and a colored man says, “I do not care how many are riding around, I am a Republican and expect to vote the ticket.” Just then a man walked up with a pistol and shot him. Pretty soon another colored man made some expression and he was shot at."

=== Move to California ===
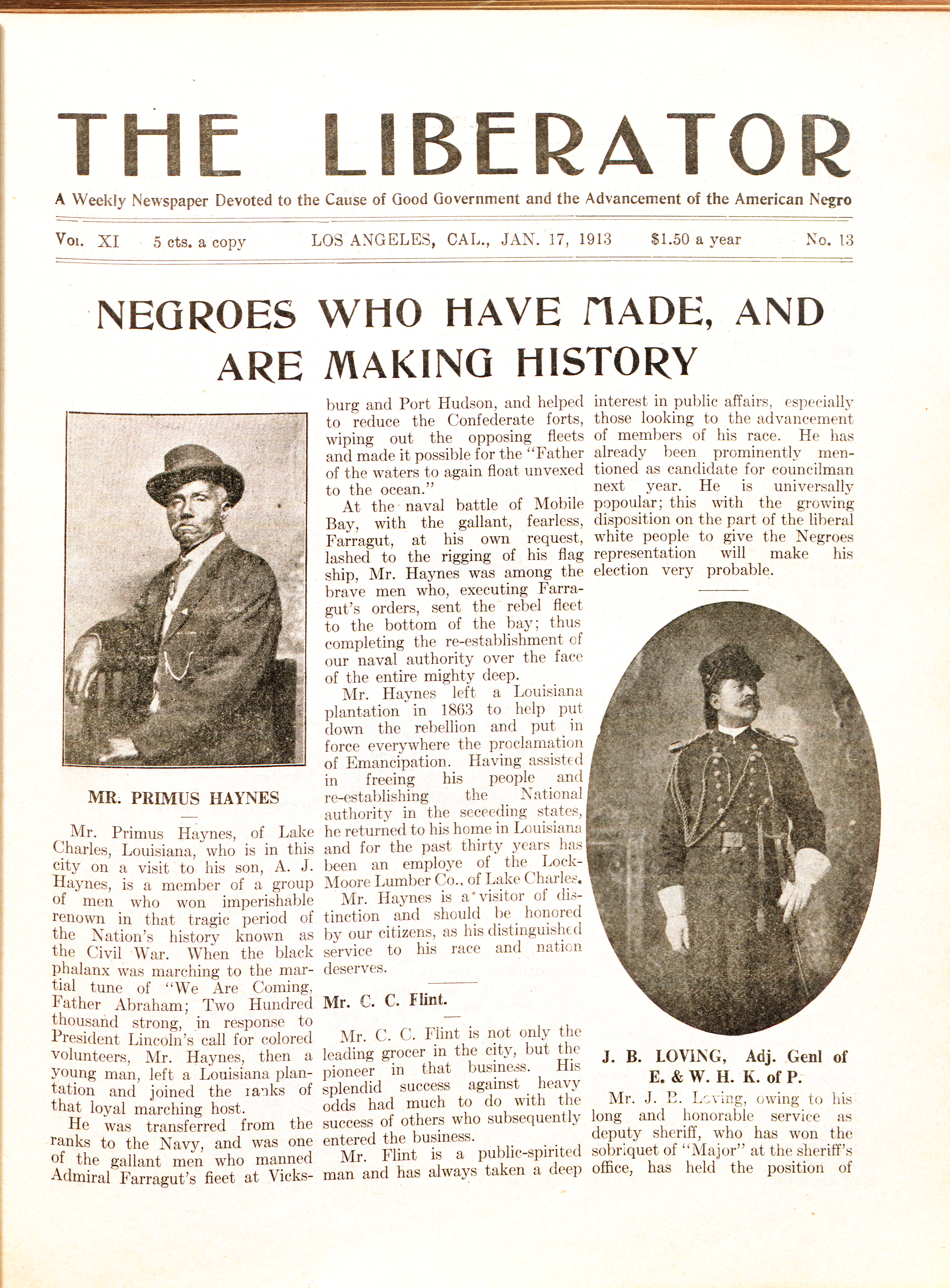
A preliminary scan of The Liberator Volume 11, Issue 13, 1913-01-17, p. 02 made by the Los Angeles Public Library from the Edmonds Family Collection for the 2018 Los Angeles City Hall African American Heritage Month Exhibit "Write In America," presented in part by the office of Los Angeles City Council President, Herb Wesson.

In response to death threats against his family, Edmonds left post-Reconstruction Mississippi for Los Angeles around 1890. In 1896 he published his first newspaper, the Pasadena Searchlight. He was a political supporter of the candidacy of William Jennings Bryan, a Democrat, when the vast majority of Southern California's African Americans were Republicans. This political difference of opinion with the majority of the Searchlight's readers led his partners to relieve Edmonds of his editorial duties.

=== Participation in political parties ===
In spite of the violence and intimidation Edmonds experienced in the South, he remained politically active after moving to California. At a time when most African Americans were expected to vote for the Republican “Party of Lincoln” as a matter of course, Jefferson Edmonds advocated political support of candidates who promised to do the most good for the African American community, regardless of party. At the turn of the twentieth century, free silver—removing the United States from the gold standard—was popular with farmers for its promise of easing agricultural debt. Edmonds supported free silver through participation in both the Silver Republican and the Democratic Parties, endorsing James G. Maguire in the 1898 California gubernatorial election.

== The Liberator ==
In approximately 1900 Edmonds started a second paper in Los Angeles. He named it the Liberator in honor of both William Lloyd Garrison's famed abolitionist newspaper of the mid-nineteenth-century and, the late John Brown (abolitionist). Edmonds' Liberator, which operated over a span of about fourteen years from approximately 1900-1906 and 1910-1913, was known for its support of working-class black Angelenos. Edmonds used the Liberator to champion civil rights, and support candidates of any party whom Edmonds believed would support African American community objectives.

Edmonds was also a California "booster" who believed Southern blacks should migrate to Los Angeles both for economic opportunity and political freedom. He wrote that Southern California was “ripe for advancing the race” and cited specifically the ability of blacks to own businesses and homes. He viewed home ownership as especially important in the black quest for full citizenship.

In 2017, the Edmonds Family partnered with the Los Angeles Public Library, and the California State Library's California Revealed grant to digitize all known issues of The Liberator. They are available through California Revealed on Archive.org.

=== The Shenk Rule ===
A preliminary scan of the Liberator Volume 12, Issue 3 (1913-04-18) made by the Los Angeles Public Library from the Edmonds Family Collection for the 2018 Los Angeles City Hall African American Heritage Month Exhibit "Write In America," presented in part by the office of Los Angeles City Council President, Herb Wesson.

In 1912, the Los Angeles City Attorney, Shenk, issued a ruling stating that "...it was neither extortion or a violation of the Civil Rights Act to charge a negro more for an article than a white man..." At the time, the decision was known as the Shenk Rule, and many white business owners used it as a means of enforcing de facto segregation. Edmonds attacked the decision in print and used the pages of the Liberator to chronicle discrimination and hardship caused by the Shenk Rule.

When John Shenk ran for mayor in 1913, Jefferson L. Edmonds “urged all African Americans to vote against him. When Shenk was defeated by a small margin, Edmonds claimed 'another great victory for the Liberator.’”

== Los Angeles Times Special Edition ==
Jefferson L. Edmonds was a featured writer in several citywide newspapers, often tasked with writing about the state of black politics in Los Angeles. In 1909 he was commissioned by the Los Angeles Times to write an eight-page spread on the state of the Black Los Angeles community. The special edition was an effort to commemorate President Abraham Lincoln’s centennial birthday. At the time, Edmonds had been in the publishing business for over a decade. He focused the special edition around his personal slave narrative. He details his account of hearing the news of the Civil War ending and the promise of freedom.

Edmonds opened the special edition with an article by Booker T. Washington and cited highlights about African American homeownership, thriving businesses, and community activist groups in the Los Angeles area at the turn of the century.

== Defending Civil Rights ==
=== The Los Angeles Forum ===
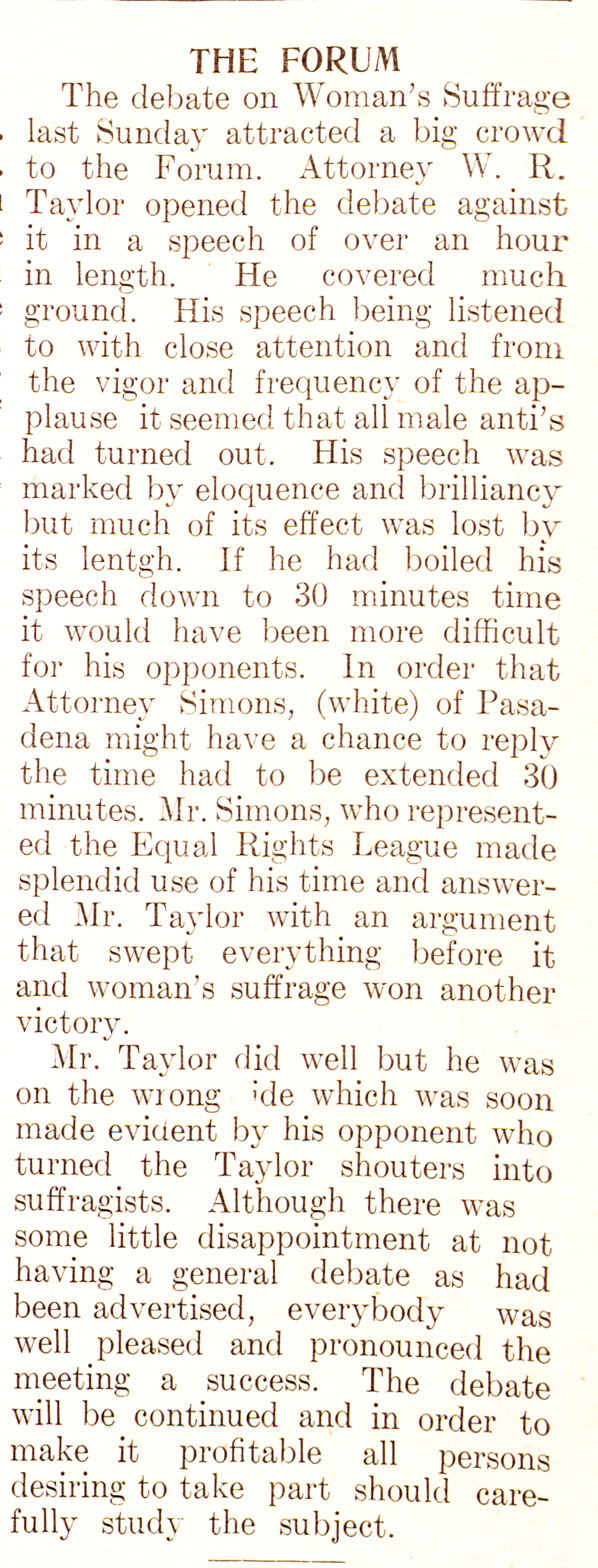
A preliminary scan of The Liberator Volume 9, Issue 18, 1911-06-16, p. 02 made by the Los Angeles Public Library from the Edmonds Family Collection for the 2018 Los Angeles City Hall African American Heritage Month Exhibit "Write In America" presented in part by the office of Los Angeles City Council President, Herb Wesson.

In 1903, Edmonds worked with Frederick Roberts and Reverend J.E. Edwards found an organization called the Los Angeles Forum whose primary purpose was to challenge racial discrimination and consolidate black political power in Los Angeles. The Los Angeles Forum (known as “The Forum”) was a series of Sunday town hall-style meetings to discuss issues in the black community that was established in 1903 by Jefferson Edmonds, the Rev. Jarrett E. Edwards, pastor of the First AME Church, and John Wesley Coleman, a businessman, among others. Meeting weekly, first at the First AME Church and then at the Odd Fellows’ Hall at 7th and Wall Streets to discuss current events, philanthropic causes, and political issues, the Forum was part of the Los Angeles African American community until 1942.

In the early 1900s, the group raised money for causes as diverse as the San Francisco earthquake, the 28th Street YMCA, black agricultural homesteading experiments, and sending Ruth Temple (the first black female doctor on the west coast) to medical school. The Forum became more politically active during the 1910s when the Shenk Rule of 1912 caused concern that Southern-style Jim Crow practices were creeping into Los Angeles. By publicizing the hardship caused by the Shenk Rule and urging voters to the polls, the Liberator and the Forum contributed to the defeat of John Shenk in the 1913 race for mayor of Los Angeles.

=== The Liberator Supported Black Business Owners ===
Edmonds used The Liberator to highlight black business owners and stressed the importance of supporting black-owned establishments. He profiled black business owners such as Mary Owens and J.B. Loving, independent realtors; A.J. Jones, hotel owner, V.W. Morris, a restaurant owner, and many more.

=== J.L. Edmonds Real Estate ===
When Edmonds brought his family to Los Angeles in 1892, African Americans could freely purchase and inhabit property in many parts of the city. But as more African Americans migrated to Los Angeles, that freedom was eroded by the rise of racially restrictive covenants, contracts which white property owners attached to the deed of a house that barred people of color from purchasing the properties. Though the practice became ubiquitous in Southern California after World War I, the first restrictive covenant that used “the all-inclusive term of ‘non-Caucasians’ to define all who could not purchase property,” was drafted in 1902, and the practice grew quickly thereafter.

As racially restrictive covenants became more popular in new housing tracts and subdivisions, Edmonds partnered with Noah Thompson in a 1913 joint real estate venture to sell homes to African Americans in and around Los Angeles, the Noah D. Thompson Realty Company.

Noah Thompson worked with Booker T. Washington at the Tuskegee Institute from 1909 to 1911 before moving to Los Angeles. He later served as the president of the Los Angeles branch of Marcus Garvey's Universal Negro Improvement Association. He was also a journalist who wrote for the Los Angeles Times, Evening Press, and the Morning Tribune, and worked as an associate editor of the Liberator.

=== The Crisis ===
Edmonds covered W.E.B. Du Bois’ historic trips to Los Angeles in 1913 in the pages of the Liberator. Dr. Du Bois was impressed with his visit, proclaiming that “Nowhere in the United States is the Negro so well and beautifully housed, nor the average of efficiency and intelligence in the colored population so high.”

== Legacy ==
=== Death ===
Jefferson Lewis Edmonds died on January 4, 1914. One of his eulogies was read by former Los Angeles Mayor Meredith P. Snyder. While the Liberator did not survive Edmonds’ death, the Forum continued for an additional 28 years, and Edmonds’ legacy of service to Los Angeles survives to this day.

In 2001, Lonnie Bunch, now the founding director of the National Museum of African American History and Culture, wrote:

As a leader and a visionary in the struggle against racism in Southern California, Edmonds deserves the scholarly attention and reputation garnered by his contemporaries William Monroe Trotter, editor of the Boston Guardian, and Robert Abbott, publisher of the Chicago Defender.

=== Family ===
In 2018, Edmonds and his descendants were among those honored at a Los Angeles City Hall ceremony opening the 2018 Los Angeles City Hall African American Heritage Month Exhibit "Write In America". The ceremony and exhibit were presented by the offices of City Council President, Herb Wesson, Councilmember Marqueece Harris-Dawson, and Councilmember Curren Price.
