= Saint Liberator =

Saint Liberator (or St. Liberator) may refer to:

- Saint Liberator, a Christian martyr
- Saint Liberator, an abbey in Italy
- Saint Liberator, a monastery in Italy
- Saint Liberator, a sanctuary in Italy
