= A Revolta dos Dândis =

Studio album by Engenheiros do Hawaii
- Released: 1987
- Genres: Rock, post-punk, new wave
- Length: 44:03
- Label: BMG/RCA

Engenheiros do Hawaii chronology
Longe Demais das Capitais (1986)	A Revolta dos Dândis (1987)	Ouça o que Eu Digo, Não Ouça Ninguém (1988)

A Revolta dos Dândis (English: "The Revolt of the Dandies") is the second album by Brazilian rock band Engenheiros do Hawaii, released in 1987. It contains the hits "Infinita Highway" (Endless Highway), "Terra de Gigantes" (Land of Giants) and "A Revolta dos Dândis I" (The Revolt of the Dandies I).

== Released ==
The album was released as LP and Compact Cassette on 15 October 1987, the album became a big success, selling more than 50 thousand copies in the first year of released. It was released three singles (for the songs "A Revolta dos Dândis I", "Terra de Gigantes" and "Infinita Highway"): the first on 28 September 1987 and the other two released later in the same year.

A Revolta dos Dândis ratings
Review scores
Source	Rating
Bizz (1987)	Positive
Folha de S.Paulo (1987)	Positive
Jornal do Brasil (1987)	Positive
Zero Hora (1987)	Positive

== Track listing ==
list of tracks taker from spotify and the cited book.

1. "A Revolta Dos Dândis I (The Revolt Of The Dândis I)" – 4:10
2. "Terra De Gigantes (Land of Giants)" – 3:59
3. "Infinita Highway (Endless Highway)" – 6:11
4. "Refrão De Bolero (Bolero's Chorus)" – 4:34
5. "Filmes De Guerra, Canções De Amor (War Movies, Love Songs)" – 4:02
6. "A Revolta Dos Dândis II (The Revolt Of The Dândis II)" – 3:13
7. "Além Dos Outdoors (Beyond the Outdoors)" – 3:33
8. "Vozes (Voices)" – 3:35
9. "Quem Tem Pressa Não Se Interessa (Who's In A Rush, Doesn't Care)" (Humberto Gessinger; Carlos Maltz) – 2:27
10. "Desde Aquele Dia (Since That Day)" – 3:30
11. "Guardas Da Fronteira (Border Guards)" – 4:31

== Personnel ==
According to the following books.

=== Musicians ===
The Band

- Humberto Gessinger — vocals, bass; electric guitar on "Terra de Gigantes", 12-string guitar on "Vozes"
- Augusto Licks — electric and acoustic guitars; harmonica on "A Revolta dos Dândis I" and "A Revolta dos Dândis II"; Hammond organ on "Vozes"
- Carlos Maltz — drums, percussion, gourd; vocals on "Filmes de Guerra, Canções de Amor"

Guests

- Julio Reny — vocals on "Guardas da Fronteira"
- Reinaldo Barriga — bass on "Terra de Gigantes"
- Jaguar, Picolé, Tuca — percussion on "Filmes de Guerra, Canções de Amor"

=== Technical data ===
- Walter Lima: Mixing, Recording technician.
- Stelio Carlini: Recording technician.
- José Oswaldo Martins: Cut.
- Miguel Plopschi: Art direction.
- Tadeu Valério: Project coordinator, Graphic coordinator.
