= Liberatore =

Liberatore is a surname. Notable people with the surname include:

- Adam Liberatore, American baseball player
- Lou Liberatore, American actor
- Matteo Liberatore, Italian Jesuit philosopher and theologian
- Matthew Liberatore, American baseball player
- Niccolò di Liberatore, Italian painter
- Tanino Liberatore, Italian comics author and illustrator
- Tom Liberatore, Australian rules footballer, son of Tony
- Tony Liberatore, former Australian rules footballer

== See also ==
- 17960 Liberatore, asteroid
- Liberator (disambiguation)
- Liberatores, the self-selected name of the assassins of Julius Caesar
