= Liberato (album) =

Studio album by Liberato
- Released: 9 May 2019
- Genre: Alternative R&B; canzone napoletana; electronic dance music
- Length: 45:44
- Language: Neapolitan
- Label: self-published

Liberato chronology
| Liberato (2019) | Ultras (2020) |

Singles from Poké melodrama
- 1. "Nove maggio" Released: 14 February 2017; 2. "Tu t'e scurdat' 'e me" Released: 9 May 2024; 3. "Me staje appennenn' amò" Released: 20 January 2018; 4. "Intostreet" Released: 2 May 2018; 5. "Je te voglio bene assaje" Released: 3 May 2018

Liberato is the debut studio album by Italian singer Liberato. It was released on 9 May 2019. It contains five previously released singles, five new tracks and an acoustic cover of the single "Gaiola portafortuna".

== Background ==
The unreleased tracks which make up the album are accompanied by a series of clips written and directed by Francesco Lettieri, together forming a mini-story titled Capri Rendez-Vous. They tell the star-crossed love story between Marie, a French actress who's in Capri to shoot a film, and Carmine, a young Neapolitan boy who's working for the troupe. The story begins in 1966 and unfolds over the course of 5 decades to the present day.

== Track listing ==
All tracks are written by Liberato.

| No. | Title | Length |
|---|---|---|
| 1. | "Nove maggio" | 3:41 |
| 2. | "Intostreet" | 4:15 |
| 3. | "Je te voglio bene assaje" | 4:03 |
| 4. | "Oi Marì" | 4:16 |
| 5. | "Gaiola" (acoustic cover of "Gaiola portafortuna") | 2:12 |
| 6. | "Tu me faje ascì pazz'" | 3:42 |
| 7. | "Guagliò" | 3:19 |
| 8. | "Me staje appennenn' amò" | 5:06 |
| 9. | "Nunn'a voglio 'ncuntrà" | 7:06 |
| 10. | "Niente" | 4:02 |
| 11. | "Tu t'e scurdat' 'e me" | 4:02 |
| Total length: | | 45:44 |

== Charts ==
Weekly chart performance for Liberato
| Chart (2022) | Peak position |
|---|---|
| Italian Albums (FIMI) | 5 |

== Certifications ==
Certifications for Liberato
| Region | Certification | Certified units/sales |
|---|---|---|
| Italy (FIMI) | Platinum | 50,000^{‡} |
^{‡} Sales+streaming figures based on certification alone.
