= Parthenope (fungus) =

Scientific classification
- Kingdom: Fungi
- Division: Ascomycota
- Class: Leotiomycetes
- Order: Helotiales
- Family: incertae sedis
- Genus: Parthenope; Velen. (1934)

Type species
- Parthenope parasitica Velen. (1934)

Species
- P. parasitica P. pilatii

Genus of fungi

Parthenope is a genus of fungi in the Helotiales order. The relationship of this taxon to other taxa within the order is unknown (incertae sedis), and it has not yet been placed with certainty into any family.
