= Liberators (video game) =

2016 video game

Liberators is a freemium World War II strategy game created from Hong Kong game developing company Mutantbox. The game was released on the Mutantbox website and on Facebook in January 2016, and now has over 300 servers across Europe and the US West and US East.

== Gameplay ==
Liberators is played by recruiting different commanders and deploying their squads in formations against enemies. These formations are automatically controlled, so the player's role is to make sure that they've deployed the best Commanders in their army. Based on World War II, Liberators features key historical commanders such as Eisenhower, Churchill, and Patton who can be recruited into your army, along with dozens more. Through gaining EXP and getting the best equipment, players level up their commanders and stay competitive in both the game's main storyline and various different PVP style matches.

== Recognition ==
In 2016, Facebook listed Liberators as one of Facebook's 2016 Best Web Games.
