= Nuno Leal Maia =

Brazilian actor (born 1947)

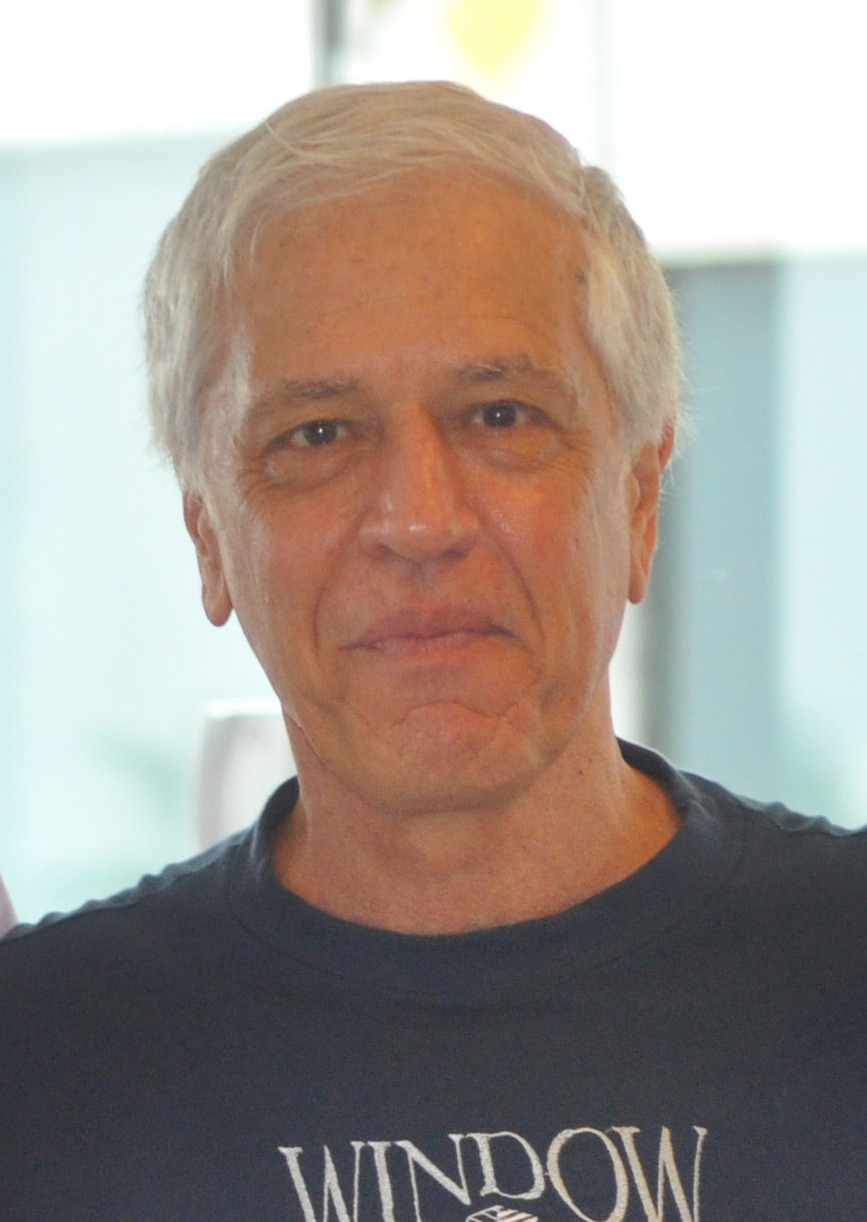
- Born: October 17, 1947 (age 78); Santos, São Paulo
- Occupation: Actor
- Years active: 1970–2020

Nuno Leal Maia (born 17 October 1947) is a Brazilian actor and former football manager. Born in Santos, São Paulo, Maia started his career as a stage actor in the 1970s, and then debuting on cinema in the 1973 film Anjo Loiro starred by Vera Fischer. Maia became notorious for his role on the 1979 pornochanchada film Bem Dotado – O Homem de Itu, having appeared in more than 30 films since then as well as in television series and telenovelas.

== Selected filmography ==
- A Virgem (1973) as Mário
- Anjo Loiro (1973)
- Cada um Dá o que Tem (1975) (segment "Despejo, O")
- Estúpido Cupido (1976, TV Series) as Acioly
- Paranóia (1976) as Pimenta
- O Quarto da Viúva (1976)
- Guerra é Guerra (1976) (segment "Núpcias com Futebol")
- Chão Bruto (1976)
- Gente Fina É Outra Coisa (1977)
- Elas São do Baralho (1977)
- Lady on the Bus (1978) as Carlinhos
- O Bem Dotado - O Homem de Itu (1978) as Lírio
- O Escolhido de Iemanjá (1978)
- O Bom Marido (1978) as Borba Gato
- Embalos Alucinantes: A Troca de Casais (1978) as Ramon
- As Amantes de Um Homem Proibido (1978) as Leandro
- O Caso Cláudia (1979)
- O Princípio do Prazer (1979) as Jangadeiro
- Inquietações de Uma Mulher Casada (1979)
- Perdoa-me Por Me Traíres (1980) as Gilberto
- Ato de Violência (1981) as Antonio Nunes Correia
- Mulher Objeto (1981) as Hélio
- Índia, a filha do Sol (1982) as Sivério
- Alguém (1982)
- Ao Sul do Meu Corpo (1982) as Policarpo
- Gabriela (1983) as Eng. Rômulo
- Águia na Cabeça (1984) as César
- Kiss of the Spider Woman (1985) as Gabriel
- Rei do Rio (1985) as Tucão
- A Gata Comeu (1985, TV Series) as Fábio Coutinho
- As Sete Vampiras (1986) as Detective Raimundo Marlou
- Solidão, Uma Linda História de Amor (1989)
- Top Model (1989-1990, TV Series) as Gaspar Kundera
- O Escorpião Escarlate (1990) as Guido Falcone
- Vamp (1991-1992, TV Series) as Jurandir (Padre Garotão)
- Pedra sobre Pedra (1992, TV Series) as Laíre
- Samba Syndrom (1992)
- Oceano Atlantis (1993)
- Louco Por Cinema (1994) as Lula
- História de Amor (1995, TV Series) as Edgar Assunção
- As Feras (1995) as Paulo Cintra
- Malhação (1995-2013, TV Series) as Prof. Paulo Pasqualette / Augusto Massafera / Fábio
- Meu Bem Querer (1998, TV Series) as Inácio Alves Serrão
- O Quinto dos Infernos (2002, TV Mini-Series) as Castro
- Um Lobisomem na Amazônia (2005) as Prof. Scott Corman
- O Profeta (2006-2007, TV Series) as Alceu
- Duas Caras (2007-2008, TV Series) as Bernardo
- Onde Andará Dulce Veiga? (2008) as Rafic
- Faça Sua História (2008, TV Series) as Passageiro
- Tainá 3: The Origin (2011) as Vô Teodoro
- Amor Eterno Amor (2012, TV Series) as Ribamar
- Chuteira Preta (2019, TV Series) as Jair
- Estação Rock (2020)
