= Fabrizio Crisafulli =

Fabrizio Crisafulli is a theatre director and visual artist. He runs the theatre company Il Pudore Bene in Vista based in Rome, which he established in 1991. Fabrizio’s production work includes space and lighting design, and he also creates installations in addition to the company’s activities. He works in Italy and various European and non-European countries. The defining aspects of his work are his use of light as an independent subject of poetic construction, and what he defines as the 'Theatre of Places' (treating the place as ’text’ and a matrix for performances), involving research along with stage production. He teaches at the Accademia di Belle Arti in Rome and at RomaTre University and is also (sept. 2015) doctor honoris causa at Roskilde University in Denmark. He holds workshops at universities, academies, festivals and theatrical organisations in Italy and abroad. He is the author of the book Active Light. Issues of Light in Contemporary Theatre (Dublin: Artdigiland, 2013).

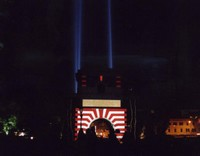
Light installation at Ponte Milvio, Rome 2003

== English Bibliography ==
- Nika Tomasevic (edited by), Place, Body, Light. The Theatre of / Il teatro di Fabrizio Crisafulli, Artdigiland, 2013;
- Fabrizio Crisafulli, Active Light. Issues of Light in Contemporary Theatre, Artdigiland, 2013;
