= Liberato II =

Studio album by Liberato
- Released: 9 May 2022
- Length: 27:18
- Language: Neapolitan
- Label: self-published

Liberato chronology
Ultras (2020)	Liberato II (2022)	Liberato III (2024)

Liberato II is the second studio album by Neapolitan singer Liberato. It was released digitally on 9 May 2022. A physical version, available in both CD and vinyl formats, was made available by the artist on December 9 of the same year.

The album features six tracks written by the artist himself, along with a techno reinterpretation of the traditional tarantella "Cicerenella".

== Track listing ==
All tracks are written by Liberato.

No.	Title	Length
1.	"Partenope"	3:37
2.	"Nun ce penzà"	4:32
3.	"Nunneover"	3:27
4.	"Anna"	3:28
5.	"Guagliuncella napulitana"	3:12
6.	"Cicerenella"	5:22
7.	"'Na storia e 'na sera"	3:40
Total length:		27:18

== Charts ==
Weekly chart performance for Liberato II
Chart (2022)	Peak position
Italian Albums (FIMI)	10

== Certifications ==
Certifications for Liberato II
Region	Certification	Certified units/sales
Italy (FIMI)	Gold	25,000^{‡}
^{‡} Sales+streaming figures based on certification alone.
