= Liberato =

3rd-century Italian Christian martyr

San Liberato or San Liberale (died 269) was a Christian martyr from Italy whose annual feast day is the 20 December.

Saint Liberato was buried in the Septem Palumbas cemetery on the Salaria Vecchia road, and his hagiography states that he was from a consular noble family but decided not to follow a political career. He was arrested and sentenced to death in Rome under Claudius Gothicus, and some believe, according to tradition, that his body lies under the basilica dedicated to the martyr John.
