= Tenuta di San Liberato, Bracciano =

Coordinates: 42°7′16.12″N 12°13′55.01″E

The Estate of San Liberato is an area of woodland and hills near Lake Bracciano in Italy, near Rome. The land was once the city of Forum Clodii, and is designated as an area of outstanding natural beauty. It is named after the Romanesque church founded on this site by the Augustinian Monks.

== History ==
The region was important for the Etruscans, with Tarquinia, Cerveteri, Tuscania and Blera are all within a few miles of the San Liberato estate. Later, this southern part of Etruria was taken over by the expanding Romans, who founded Sabate in cc. 273 BC, giving the name Lacus Sabatinus to what is now Lake Bracciano. The Romanesque church of San Liberato, surrounded by the botanic gardens of the rural estate by the same name, was erected in the 9th century. After the 'Dark Ages', the area enjoyed new vitality, as evidenced by the Castello Orsini Odescalchi, founded in the 12th century.

== The park ==
The surrounding park was designed in the 1960s by the landscape gardener Russell Page. It is home to rare plant specimens from around the world: sugar maples (acer saccharum), Japanese cherry trees (Prunus serrulata), camellias, rhododendrons (Rhododendron) and Choisya ternate, as well as ancient rose gardens. The grounds are modelled on a traditional English country garden, interspersed with evergreen hedges, with a number of themed cultivated areas, such as the herb garden opposite the mediaeval church, inspired by the Orto dei Semplici motifs.
