= Humberto Gessinger =

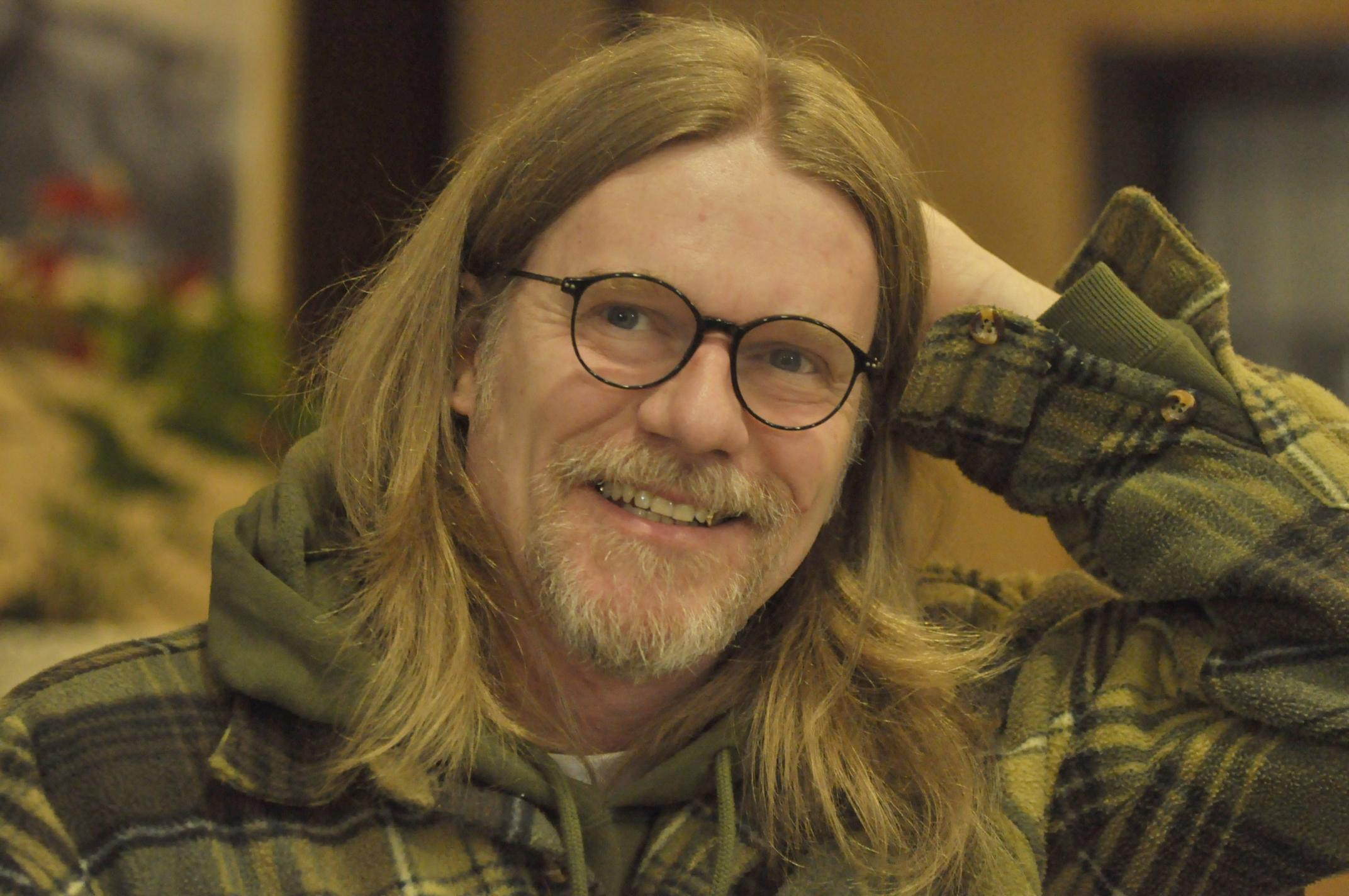

Background information
- Born: 24 December 1963 (age 62); Porto Alegre, Rio Grande do Sul, Brazil
- Genres: Rock
- Occupations: Musician, composer, writer
- Instruments: Vocals, guitar, bass, accordion, keyboards, harmonica, foot controller
- Years active: 1984–present
- Label: Stereophonica
- Website: Official website

Humberto Gessinger (born December 24, 1963) is best known as the musician, guitarist, and bassist from the Brazilian band Engenheiros do Hawaii.

== Musical career ==
=== Engenheiros do Hawaii ===
In late 1984, Gessinger formed a rock band besides two friends from architecture college at UFRGS, Carlos Maltz and Marcelo Pitz, to play in a parade made by students. The band decided to call themselves Engenheiros do Hawaii [Engineers from Hawaii, in English], as a joke with the surf wear that most engineering students sported at the university campus - far away from the nearest beaches.

The band released their first album in 1986, although they had already appeared in a "promising bands" collection of BMG Music in 1985. With the departure of Marcelo Pitz in May 1987, Gessinger started playing bass and the band recruited Augusto Licks as lead guitarist, becoming one of the most successful bands at the time. After the departure of both Licks (1993) and Maltz (1996), it entered a brief hiatus while Gessinger played along his newly formed band, Humberto Gessinger Trio. Engenheiros do Hawaii reunited in 1997 with the trio's formation (Humberto playing bass, Luciano Granja on guitar and Adal Fonseca on drums). In 2001, with yet another new formation of the band (Paulinho Galvão on guitar, Bernardo Fonseca on bass and Gláucio Ayala on drums), Gessinger returned to lead guitar.

=== Pouca Vogal ===
After Engenheiros stopped its activities, Gessinger joined his friend and musician Duca Leindecker, former leader of the band Cidadão Quem, and created the duo Pouca Vogal, in which they played both music from Engenheiros, Cidadão Quem and new compositions from both. The duo lasted four years, until both singers decided to go on with their solo careers.

=== Solo career ===
In 2013, Humberto Gessinger released Insular, his first solo album, and first album composed solely of new songs in ten years. He recorded music alongside musician friends from Rio Grande do Sul and former Engenheiros do Hawaii members. The album's tour was played in a "power trio" format: Gessinger back on bass (also playing keys and accordion), Rodrigo "Esteban" Tavares on guitar and Rafael Bisogno on drums. The tour's recording became a DVD, Insular Ao Vivo, released in 2014. With the latter, Gessinger was nominated in 2015 for the 16th Latin Grammy Awards in the Best Brazilian Rock Album category.

Since then, he has released two LP's, Pra Ficar Legal(2016), and Desde Aquela Noite(2017), both serving as celebration for his 30 years of his first two albums, respectively, and as basis for the following tours. His current tour, Desde Aquele Dia, is in the way of becoming a DVD recording.

== Personal life ==
Gessinger was born and raised in Porto Alegre, Brazil, along with his sisters and brother. When he was 14, his father died from leukemia.

Since the beginning of the 1990s, Gessinger has been married to architect Adriana Sesti, whom he had liked since high school, and had dated since they were both in architecture college. They had their daughter in 1992. Clara Gessinger appeared, as a baby, in several videos promoting the band's then-latest release Gessinger, Licks & Maltz. She later duetted with her father in the band's MTV Unplugged and Novos Horizontes albums.

Years after Carlos Maltz left Engenheiros, they started chatting again, eventually becoming friends. This resulted in musical partnerships: Gessinger recorded a song along Maltz in the latter's solo album (Farinha do Mesmo Saco, 2001) and the Folia de Reis EP in 2017; and Maltz made a cameo on Engenheiros do Hawaii's MTV Unplugged (2004), Novos Horizontes (2007) and the to-be released Desde Aquele Dia DVD tour (2018).

Gessinger is also a book writer and a self-taught musician.

== Discography ==
=== Engenheiros do Hawaii ===
- 1986 - Longe Demais das Capitais (BMG)
- 1987 - A Revolta dos Dândis (BMG)
- 1988 - Ouça o que Eu Digo, Não Ouça Ninguém (BMG)
- 1989 - Alívio Imediato (BMG)
- 1990 - O Papa é Pop (BMG)
- 1991 - Várias Variáveis (BMG)
- 1992 - Gessinger, Licks & Maltz (BMG)
- 1993 - Filmes de Guerra, Canções de Amor (BMG)
- 1995 - Simples de Coração (BMG)
- 1997 - Minuano (BMG)
- 1999 - ¡Tchau Radar! (Universal Music)
- 2000 - 10.000 Destinos (Universal Music)
- 2001 - 10.001 Destinos (Universal Music)
- 2002 - Surfando Karmas & Dna (Universal Music)
- 2003 - Dançando no Campo Minado (Universal Music)
- 2004 - Acústico MTV (Universal Music)
- 2007 - Novos Horizontes (Universal Music)

=== Solo ===
- 2013 - Insular (STR Música)
- 2014 - Insular ao vivo (STR Música/Coqueiro Verde Records)
- 2016 - Louco Pra Ficar Legal (Deckdisc)
- 2017 - Desde Aquela Noite (Deckdisc)
- 2018 - Ao Vivo Pra Caramba - A Revolta dos Dândis: 30 Anos (Deckdisc)
- 2018 - Canções de Amor, Filmes de Guerra (Independente)
- 2019 - Não Vejo A Hora (Deckdisc)
- 2023 - Quatro Cantos de Um Mundo Redondo (Independente)

== Books ==
Humberto Gessinger writes for newspapers and magazines he has already written five books.

- 2008 - Meu Pequeno Gremista (Editora Belas Letras)
- 2009 - Pra Ser Sincero - 123 Variações Sobre Um Mesmo Tema (Editora Belas Letras)
- 2011 - Mapas do Acaso - 45 Variações Sobre Um Mesmo Tema (Editora Belas Letras)
- 2012 - Nas Entrelinhas do Horizonte (Editora Belas Letras)
- 2013 - 6 Segundos de Atenção (Editora Belas Letras)
