= Antônio Prado =

Municipality of Rio Grande do Sul, Brazil

- Municipality
- Municipality of Antônio Prado
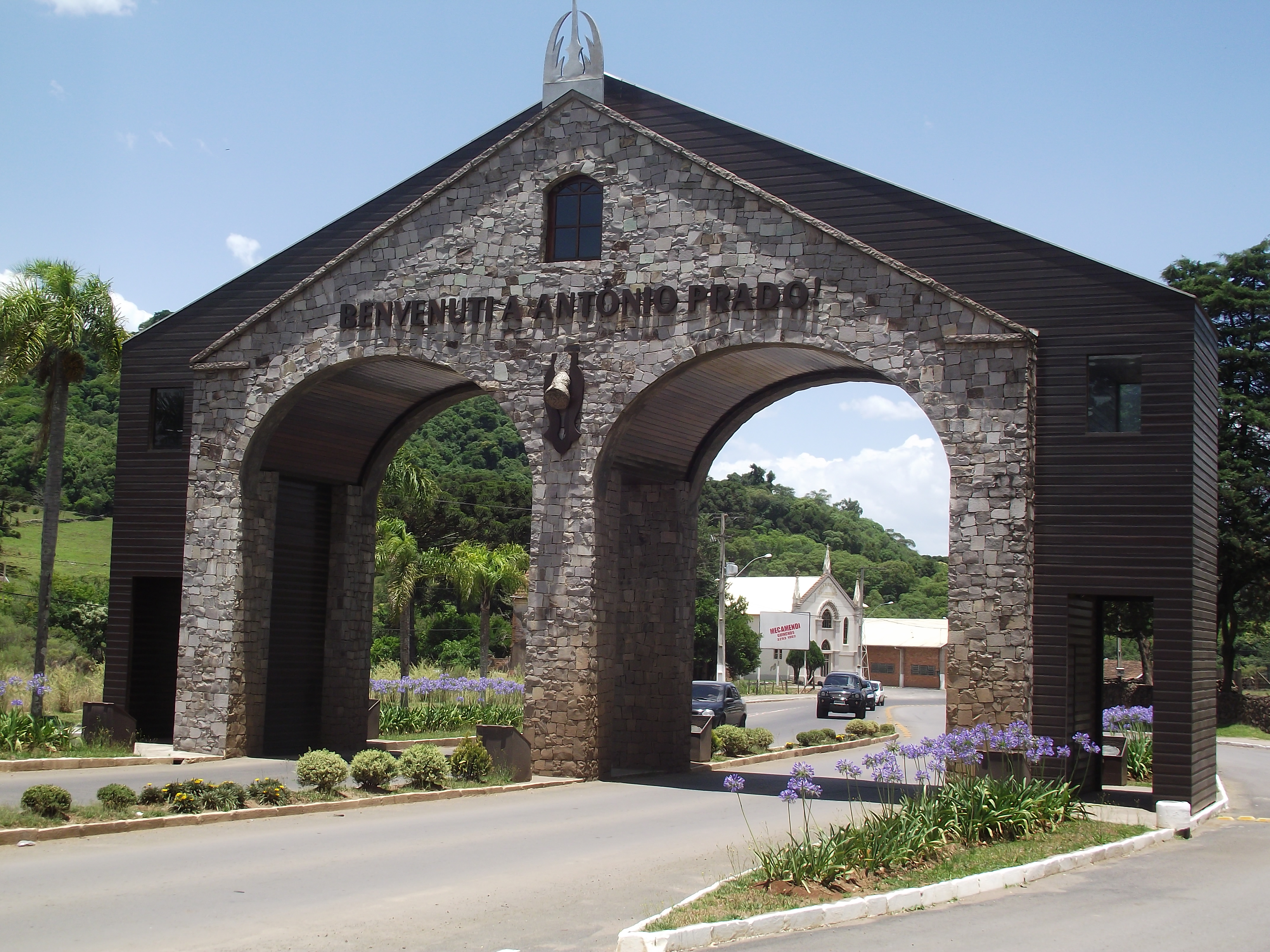
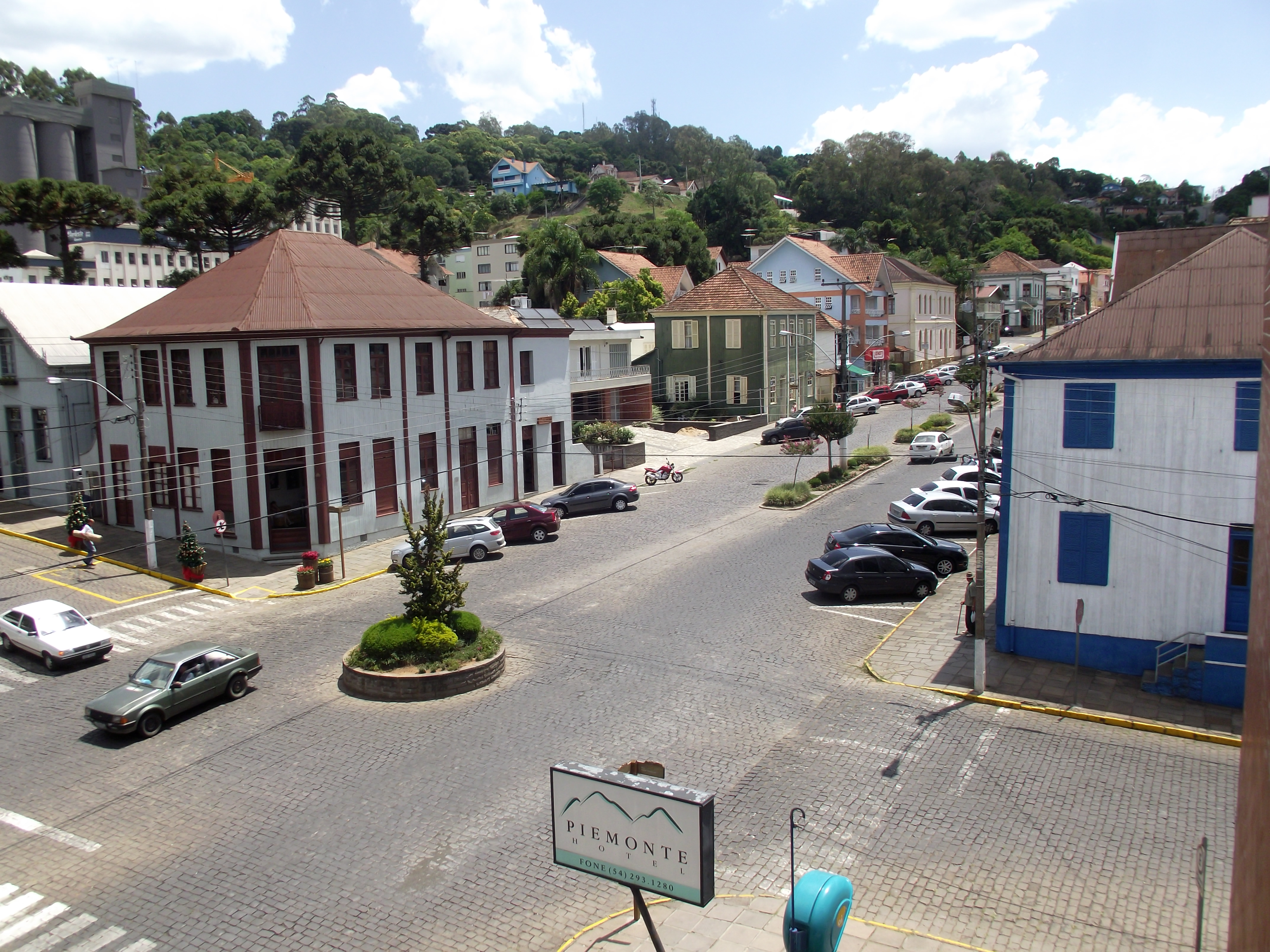
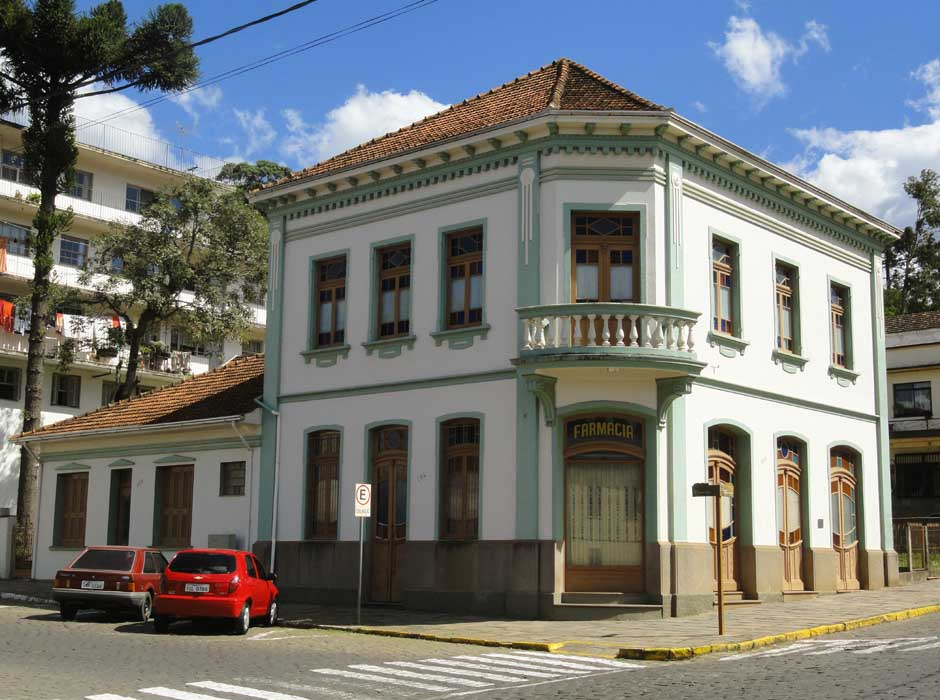
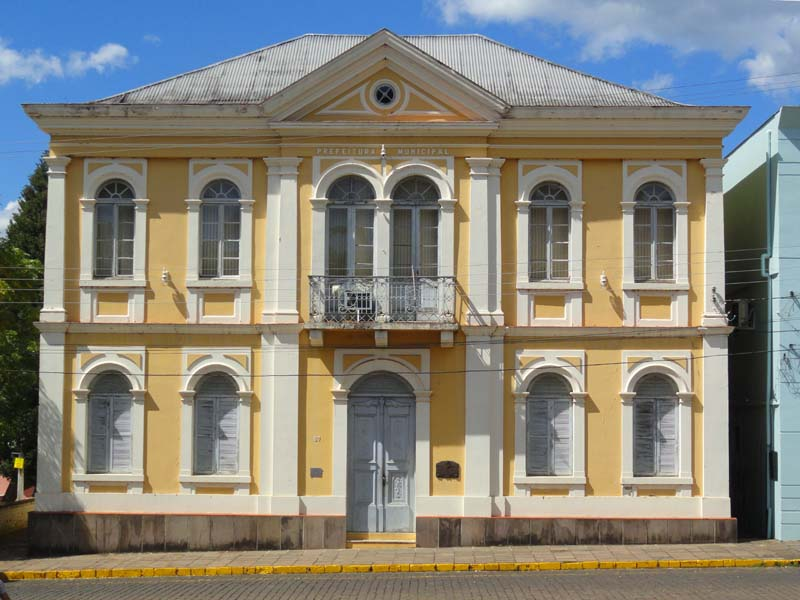
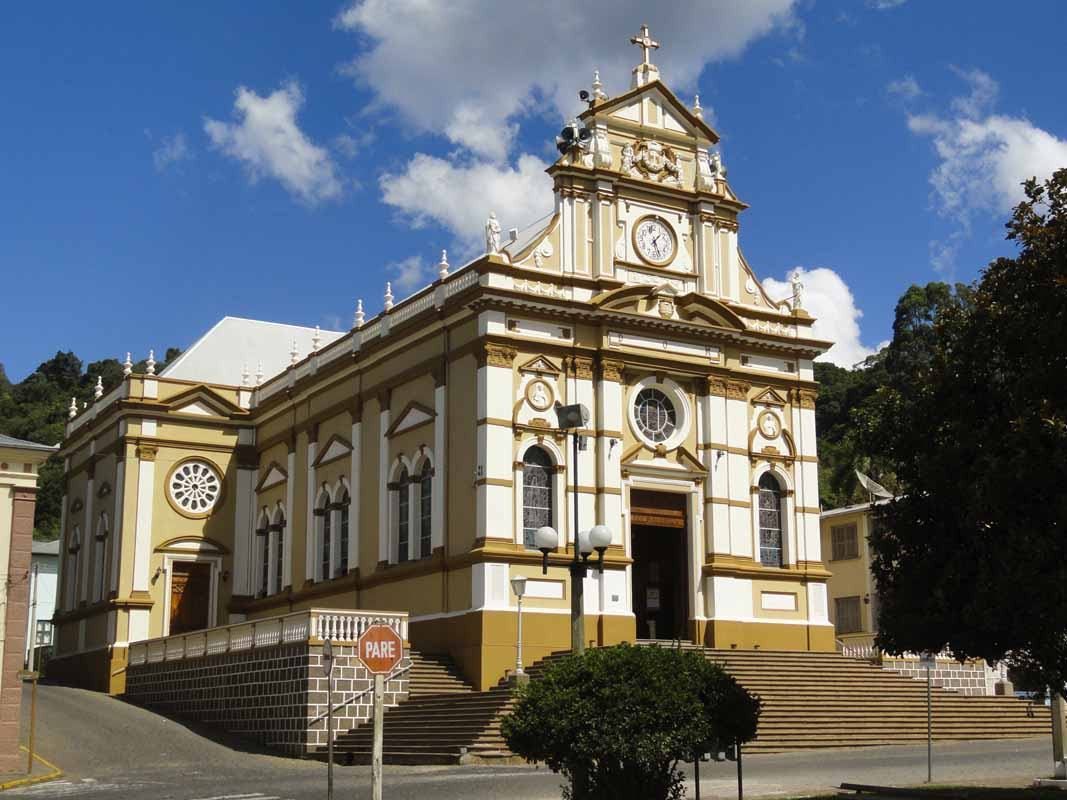
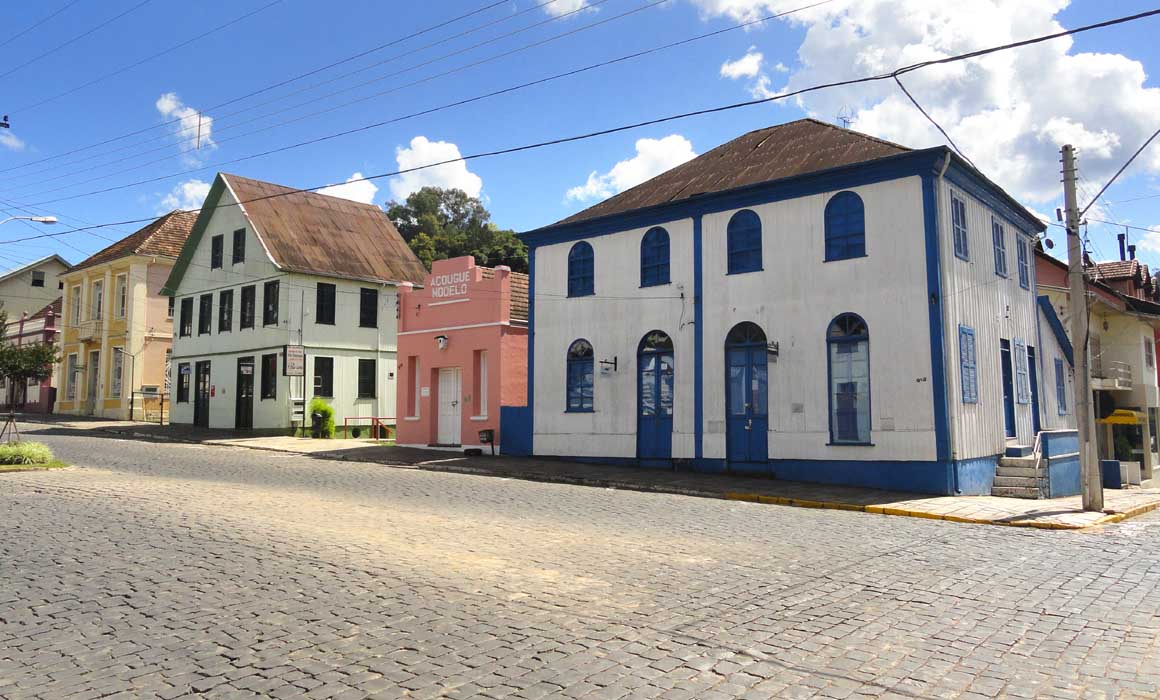
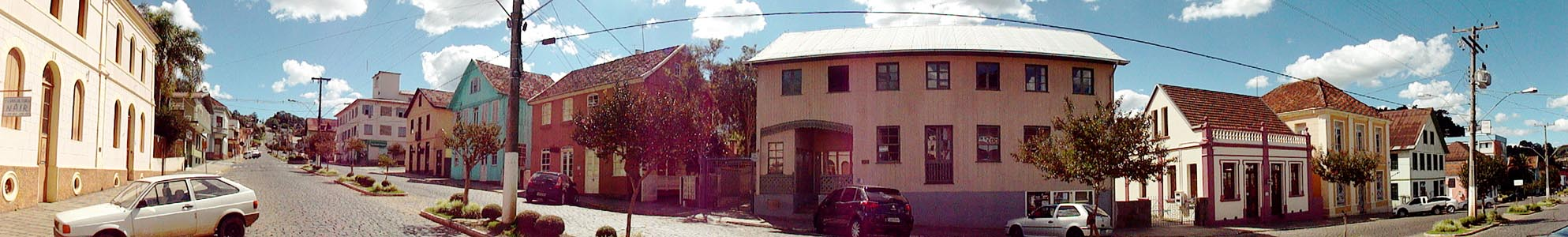

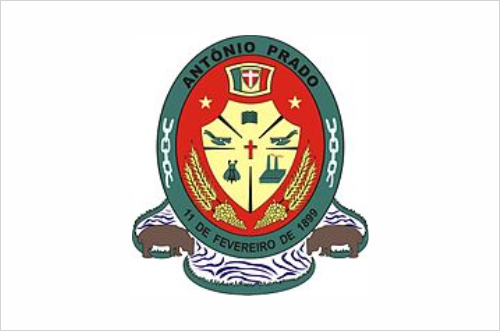
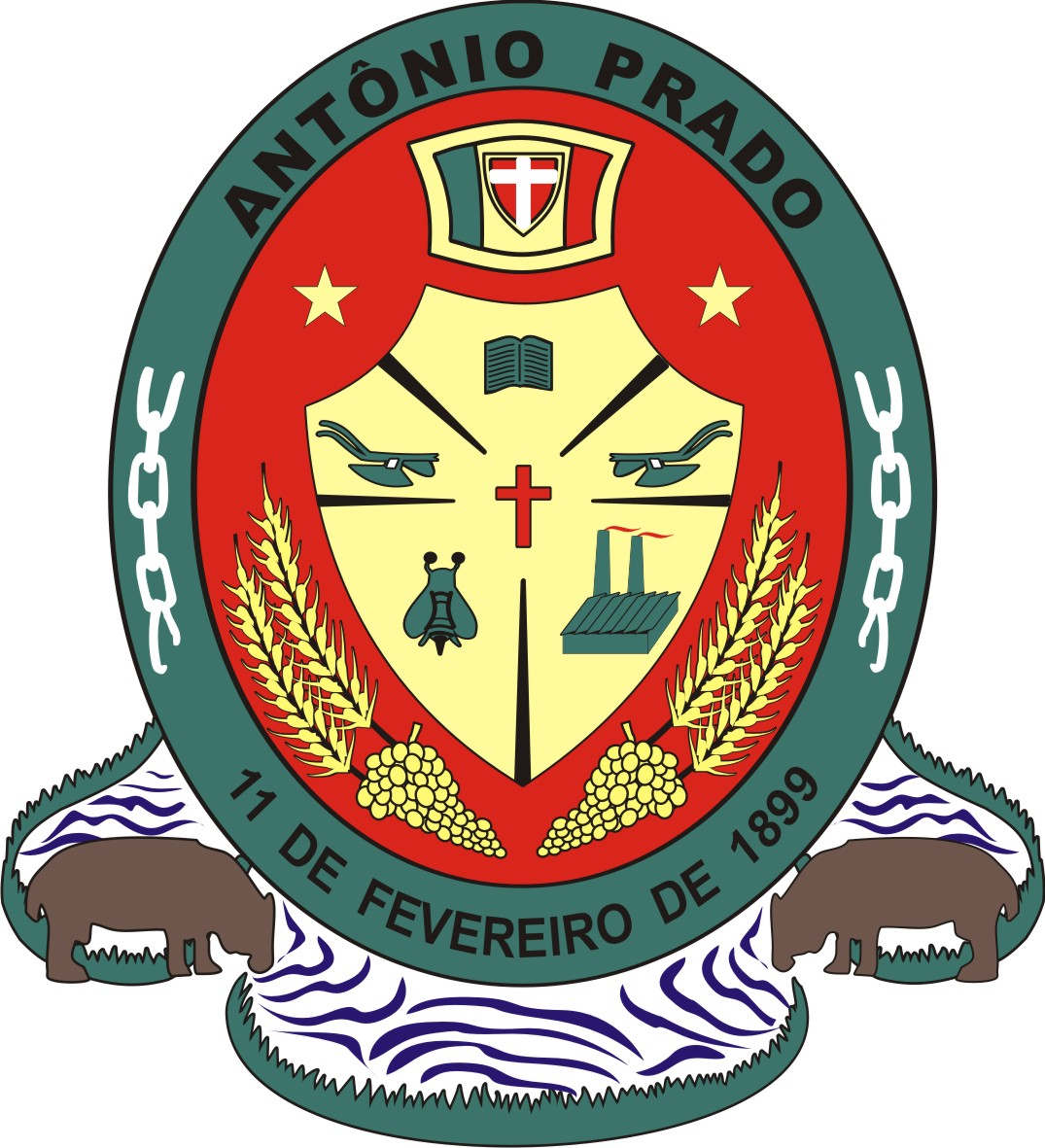
- Flag Coat of arms

- Location in Rio Grande do Sul
- Coordinates: 28°51′28″S 51°16′58″W
- Country: Brazil
- Region: South
- State: Rio Grande do Sul
- Founded: 11 February 1899

Government
  - Mayor: Roberto Dalle Molle (PP)

Area
  - Total: 347.616 km^{2} (134.215 sq mi)
- Elevation: 658 m (2,159 ft)

Population (2022)
  - Total: 13,045
  - Density: 37.527/km^{2} (97.195/sq mi)
- Time zone: UTC−3 (BRT)
- HDI (2010): 0.758 – high
- Website: antonioprado.rs.gov.br

Antônio Prado (pt-BR pronunciation) is a municipality located in the Serra Gaúcha region in the state of Rio Grande do Sul, Brazil. It boasts the largest collection of architectural heritage designated by IPHAN (the National Institute of Historic and Artistic Heritage) related to Italian colonization in Brazil. Its population is estimated at 13,045 people.

== History ==
The Serra Gaúcha was inhabited by Kaingang indigenous people since time immemorial, but they were forcefully displaced by the so-called "bugreiros" as part of an official policy by the Brazilian government to "whiten" the Brazilian population. This created an opportunity, in the late 19th century, for the Empire of Brazil to colonize the region with a European population.

Until 1880 the ancient forest that covered the entire present-day municipality of Antônio Prado was inhabited only by the Tape and Coroados indigenous peoples (Kaingang), who subsisted on the fruits of the vast pine forests. Neither the Jesuit missionaries, who founded Vacaria dos Pinhais, nor Father Francisco Ximenes, who surveyed the region in 1633, nor Raposo Tavares' expedition in 1863, reached the area. The farmers from Campos da Vacaria, who penetrated the surrounding forest in the 19th century to occupy land for farming and cattle ranching, did not venture beyond the present-day municipal boundary.

Around 1880 Simão David de Oliveira settled on the right bank of the Rio das Antas. He had traveled on foot from São Paulo, entering the Rio Grande do Sul territory through Vacaria. He followed the Vieira River, descending to the Rio das Antas, in search of a place to build his hut. On the only flat stretch of land he found, near the mouth of the Rio Leão and the Tigre Stream, Simão established himself. The trail known as "Passo do Simão" would provide access to the new colony in early 1886.

It was established in 1885 by Emperor Dom Pedro II and other authorities that during the period of 1886 and 1887, a colonization nucleus would be created on the right bank of the Rio das Antas. This nucleus had no name, so the lawyer Manoel Barata Góes, the chief engineer of the Lot Measurement Commission, suggested and requested that the new colony be named Antônio Prado, in honor of Antônio da Silva Prado, a São Paulo farmer who, as Minister of Agriculture at the time, promoted the arrival of Italian immigrants to Brazil and established colonial nuclei in Rio Grande do Sul.

Antônio Prado was the last Italian colony created by the imperial government. In 1886, the first Italians settled in the region, dedicating themselves to small-scale agriculture. Currently, it is considered the city with the greatest Italian influence in Brazil.

The district was created with the name Antônio Prado by Municipal Act No. 66 of 26 September 1894, subordinated to the municipality of Vacaria. Separated from Vacaria, Antônio Prado was elevated to the status of a town by State Decree No. 220 on 11 February 1899.

In a territorial division as of 2015 the municipality consists of three districts: Antônio Prado, Linha 21 de Abril, and Santana.

On 28 September 2016, the Italian language, Talian, was officially recognized in the municipality.

=== Name origin ===
The city's name is a tribute to the São Paulo farmer Antônio da Silva Prado, who established colonial settlements in Rio Grande do Sul and promoted the immigration of Italians to the country when he was the Minister of Agriculture.

== Geography ==
It is surrounded by the municipalities Ipê, Flores da Cunha, Vila Flores, Nova Roma do Sul, São Marcos, Nova Pádua, and Protásio Alves. It is 184 km from Porto Alegre.

Antônio Prado is located at a latitude of 28°51'30" south and a longitude of 51°16'58" west, with an elevation of 658 meters. It has an area of 343.28 square kilometers, and its estimated population in 2018 was 13,055 inhabitants. The actual population density is 37 people per square kilometer.

=== Ethnicities ===
Antônio Prado is a city primarily populated by Brazilians of European descent, with one of the highest percentages of Italian-Brazilians in the country. Other European ethnicities make up a small minority, while people of African, mixed-race, and indigenous origins constitute the remainder.

Ethnicity	Percentage (IBGE 2000)
White	91.8%
Brunette	2.3%
Brown	5.2%
Indigenous	0.6%

The municipality is also an eco-tourism destination, featuring waterfalls within the araucaria forest. Common outdoor activities in the surrounding area include rappelling and whitewater rafting.

== Culture ==
The city boasts the largest and most comprehensive architectural ensemble of Italian colonization in Brazil, with 48 properties in the urban center designated as historical landmarks by the National Institute of Historic and Artistic Heritage (IPHAN) since the 1980s. Other properties in the rural areas of Antônio Prado have similarly withstood the test of time and hold significant historical and architectural value as symbols of Italian colonization in southern Brazil.

In 1995, the city hosted the film crew of "O Quatrilho," the second Brazilian film to be nominated for an Oscar. Some streets in the central area had their cobblestones covered with soil, and the streetlights were removed to recreate the streets of Caxias do Sul in the early 20th century.

== Sister cities ==
- Italy Cavaion Veronese, Verona, Italy
- Italy Rotzo, Vicenza, Italy

== See also ==
- List of municipalities in Rio Grande do Sul
- Fenamassa
- Talian
- Antônio Prado historic center
