= Luiz Carlos Barreto =

Brazilian film producer (1928–2026)

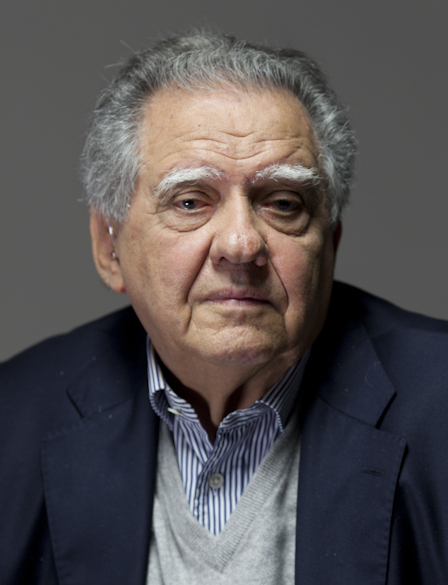
- Barreto in 2010
- Born: 20 May 1928; Sobral, Ceará, Brazil
- Died: 22 July 2026 (aged 98); Rio de Janeiro, Brazil
- Occupations: Film producer, screenwriter, cinematographer
- Spouse: Lucy Vilella (m. 1952)
- Children: 3, including Bruno and Fábio
- Relatives: Felipe Adão (grandson)

Luiz Carlos Barreto (20 May 1928 – 22 July 2026), also known as Barretão, was a Brazilian film producer, director, screenwriter and cinematographer, as well as the father of Brazilian directors Bruno Barreto and Fábio Barreto. A leading figure in Brazil's Cinema Novo movement of the 1960s, he started in film after being invited to work on the production and writing of the 1962 O Assalto ao Trem Pagador and the cinematography of the 1963 Vidas Secas. Also in 1963, he and his wife, Lucy Barreto, founded the production company L. C. Barreto Produções Cinematográficas. They were involved in the creation of over 60 films together.

During the 1970s and 80s, at the height of Brazil's military dictatorship, Barreto and his family, unlike other members of the Cinema Novo movement, continued to find commercial success; the film Dona Flor and Her Two Husbands, produced by Barreto and Lucy and directed by his son, Bruno, became one of the most popular films in Brazil. Barreto continued to be a leading figure in the 1990s Resumption Cinema and remained active in the twenty-first century.

== Early life and career beginnings ==
Luiz Carlos Barreto was born on 20 May 1928, in Sobral, Ceará, the northeastern part of Brazil, and grew up in Fortaleza. His first job was for an illegal communist newspaper. In 1947, when he was 19, he was employed by Companhia Siderúrgica Nacional (CSN) and moved to Rio de Janeiro. In the city, he joined the football club Flamengo as a youth player.

== Career ==
=== Career in journalism ===
By 1950, he had left CSN and begun to work as a reporter for the Diários Associados-owned magazine A Cigarra, then after that, as a reporter for O Cruzeiro. Two years later, he began to work as a photographer for the paper because he wanted to "earn more and travel more", eventually discovering that he enjoyed "telling stories with the lens more than writing". He worked both in Brazil and as a European correspondent for O Cruzeiro, covering the 1954 Cannes Film Festival and taking photographs of celebrities including Frank Sinatra, Marilyn Monroe, Marlene Dietrich, and world leaders including various Latin American presidents, Fidel Castro, Che Guevara, and Nikita Khrushchev. Interested in film, he enrolled in the French Institut des hautes études cinématographiques in the 1950s, following his future wife, Lucy Vilella, who had moved to the country to study piano, but he became bored of taking classes after a few months and instead visited studios to observe the production process.

=== Debut in cinema and involvement in the Cinema Novo movement ===
Working as a reporter covering films gave Barreto the opportunity to meet various Brazilian directors; when reporting on the film Barravento, in 1961, Barreto was convinced by its director, Glauber Rocha, to co-produce and co-write a film. Released as O Assalto ao Trem Pagador (transl. Assault on the Pay Train) in 1962, this marked Barreto's debut in cinema. Rocha further persuaded Barreto to take up cinematography; Barreto was initially reluctant, believing that his skills as a photographer would not transfer to the medium of film, but he agreed to do the cinematography on the 1963 Vidas Secas (Barren Lives). Responsible for the "dry, harsh" lighting created by removing the filters from the cameras, Barreto also worked on the film as a co-producer. It was screened at Cannes the following year.

In 1963, Barreto and his wife founded the production company L. C. Barreto Produções Cinematográficas. Throughout the 1960s, he was a significant figure in Brazil's Cinema Novo movement and helped create the distribution cooperative Difilme. He worked on the cinematography of films such as Entranced Earth (1967) and the production of films including Garrincha: Hero of the Jungle (1962), The Hour and Turn of Augusto Matraga (1965), The Priest and the Girl (1966),, A Grande Cidade (1966), and Antonio das Mortes (1969). While he also worked as a director, he found he preferred to produce films.

=== Mainstream success during the dictatorship, activity in Resumption Cinema ===
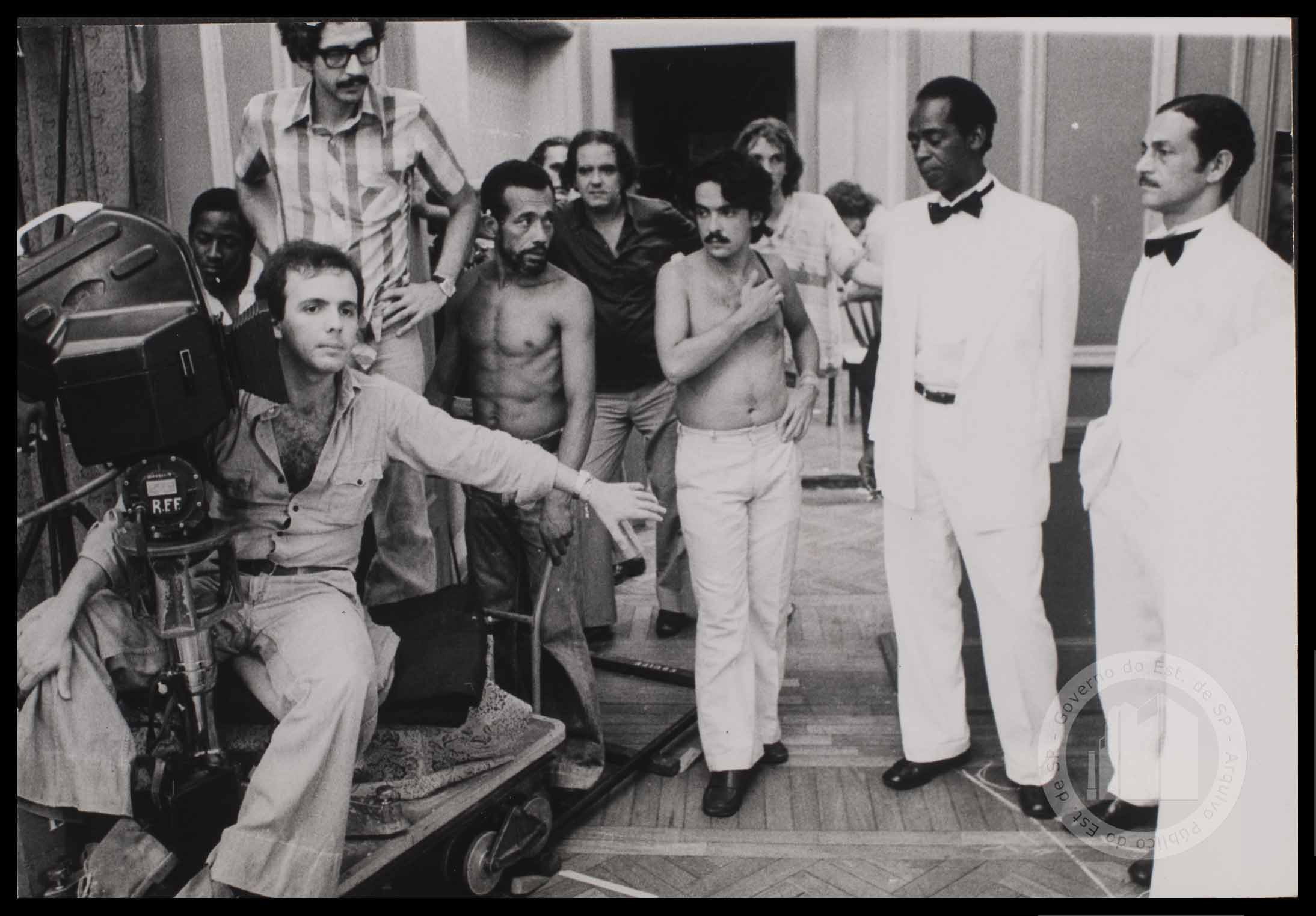
Barreto (centre, dark shirt) and son Bruno (left, behind camera) on the set of the 1976 Dona Flor and Her Two Husbands

As Brazil entered the height of its military dictatorship during the 1970s and 80s, many figures in the Cinema Novo no longer found mainstream success with their work. Barreto and his family, however, continued to make popular films with commercial appeal during the two decades. This included the comedy Dona Flor and Her Two Husbands, produced with Lucy, and directed by his son, Bruno Barreto, which became one of Brazil's most popular films. It was still subject to censorship, however: according to his daughter, before its release Barreto "spent a week in Brasilia, and convinced... [President Ernesto] Geisel's wife and daughter to watch the film and defend it" to the censors. In the 1990s, he became a leading figure in Brazil's Resumption Cinema. The film O Quatrilho (1995), which he produced with his wife, was nominated for an Oscar, and he and Lucy were awarded the Oscarito Trophy by the Gramado Film Festival. In 1997, he was awarded an Ordem do Mérito Cultural by the Brazilian Ministry of Culture.

=== 21st century ===
Barreto remained active in the 21st century; he advocated against Jair Bolsonaro's rearrangement of the Conselho Superior do Cinema and subsequent dissolution of the Ministry of Culture. He was the subject of the documentary Barretão (2019) and his work as a photographer during the 1940s and 50s was released in the book Passagem: A Memória Visual de Luiz Carlos Barreto (transl. Passage: The Visual Memory of Luiz Carlos Barreto). His photographs were also displayed in the collections of the Museum of Modern Art, Rio de Janeiro, and the São Paulo Museum of Art.

== Personal life and death ==
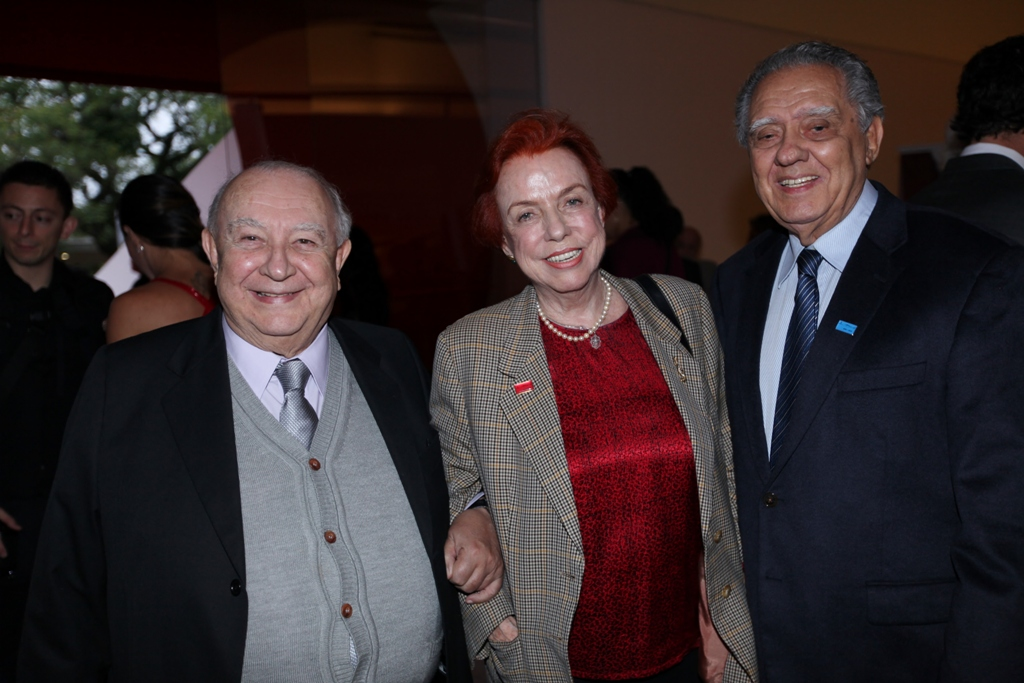
Sérgio Mamberti, Lucy Barreto and Luiz Carlos Barreto at the 2013 Ordem do Mérito Cultural awards

Barreto met his future wife, then a beauty queen and pianist, Lucy Vilella, in 1952, while photographing her for an interview. The two married in Paris in 1954 and had three children, including the directors Bruno Barreto and Fábio Barreto. Their daughter, who also works in the film industry, married footballer Cláudio Adão; Felipe Adão, also a footballer, is his grandson.

He was a fan of the Rio de Janeiro-based football club Flamengo, whose youth section he had played for. In the 1970s, he was a founding member of the Frente Ampla pelo Flamengo.

Barreto received the nickname Barretão from his friend, playwright Nelson Rodrigues.

=== Health issues and death ===
Barreto was injured in a fall in March 2024. He was hospitalized in Rio de Janeiro on 21 July 2026, where he died the next day of pneumonia. He was 98. In response, Brazilian president Luiz Inácio Lula da Silva declared three days of national mourning.

== Filmography ==
With his wife, Lucy, Barreto was involved in the creation of over 60 films and their production company, L. C. Barreto Produções Cinematográficas, was involved in the creation of over 150 during his lifetime.

- O Assalto ao Trem Pagador (transl. Assault on the Pay Train, 1962, screenwriter and producer)
- Garrincha: Hero of the Jungle (1962, producer)
- Vidas Secas (1963)
- The Hour and Turn of Augusto Matraga (1965)
- A Grande Cidade (1966)
- The Priest and the Girl (1966, producer)
- Entranced Earth (1967, cinematographer)
- Antonio das Mortes (1969, producer)
- Brazil Year 2000 (1969)
- The Alienist (1970)
- How Tasty Was My Little Frenchman (1971)
- A Estrela Sobe (1974, producer)
- Isto É Pelé (1974, co-directed with Eduardo Escorel)
- Guerra Conjugal (1975)
- O Casal (1975)
- Dona Flor and Her Two Husbands (1976, producer)
- Amor Bandido (1979, producer)
- Bye Bye Brazil (1979)
- Índia, a Filha do Sol (1982)
- Menino do Rio
- Inocência (1983)
- Memoirs of Prison (1984)
- Nunca Fomos tão Felizes (1984)
- Ele, o Boto (1987)
- The Story of Fausta (1988)
- O Quatrilho (1995, producer)
- Four Days in September (1997)
- Bela Donna (1998)
- Bossa Nova (2000, producer)
- 2000 Nordestes (2000)
- The Middle of the World (2003)
- The House of Sand (2005, story)
- Lula, Son of Brazil (2009, producer)
- João, O Maestro (2017)

== Books ==
- Barreto, Luiz Carlos; Nogueira, Armando (2001). Passagem: A memória visual de Luiz Carlos Barreto [Passage: The Visual Memory of Luiz Carlos Barreto] (in Brazilian Portuguese). Rio de Janeiro: Objetiva. ISBN 9788573023626. OCLC 48682997.
