= Bruno Campos =

Brazilian actor and lawyer (born 1973)

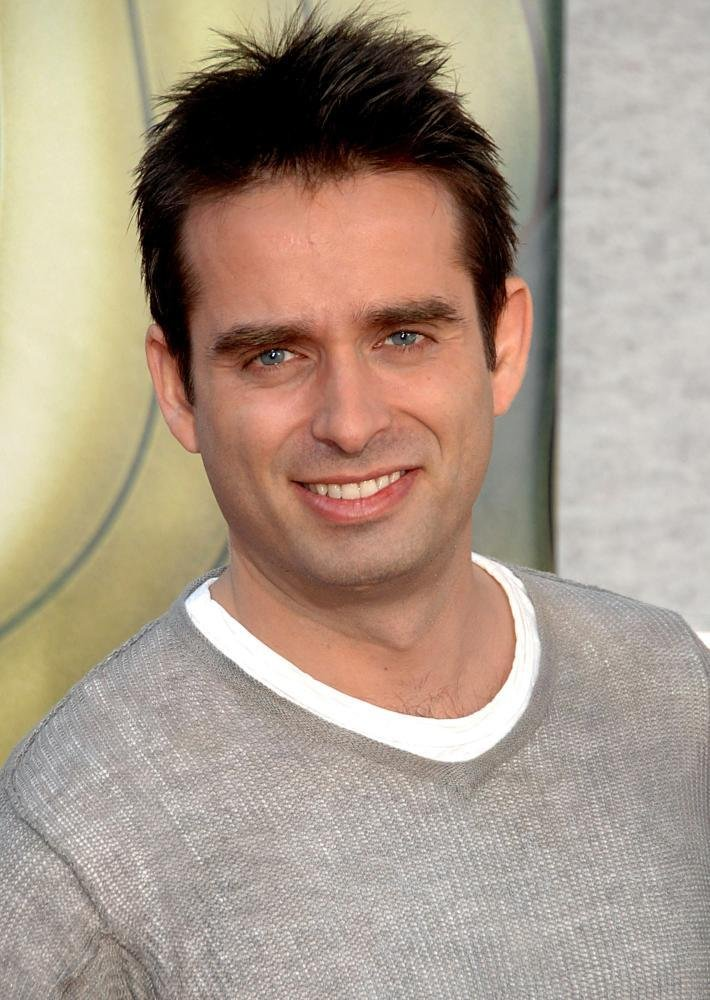
- Campos in 2009
- Born: 3 December 1973 (age 52); Rio de Janeiro, Brazil
- Education: Interlochen Arts Academy
- Alma mater: Northwestern University (BS); University of Michigan (JD)
- Occupations: Actor; lawyer
- Years active: 1995–2011, 2024 (actor); 2013–present (lawyer)
- Spouse: Karina (m. 2000)
- Children: 2

Bruno Campos (Portuguese: [ˈbɾunu ˈkɐ̃pus]) (born 3 December 1973) is a Brazilian lawyer and former actor.

He made his film debut in the Academy Award-nominated Brazilian drama O Quatrilho (1995), and is known for his roles in American television, including Diego Vasquez on the sitcom Jesse (1998–2000), Joe Rivera on the drama Leap Years (2001–2002), Dr. Eddie Dorset on ER (2003), and Dr. Quentin Costa / The Carver on Nip/Tuck (2004–2005). He also voiced Prince Naveen in the animated feature The Princess and the Frog (2009).

In 2010, Campos enrolled in law school, earning a J.D. degree in 2013. He currently works at the law firm Harris Beach Murtha.

== Early life ==
Campos was born on 3 December 1973 in Rio de Janeiro, Brazil. His father, Paulo Campos, was an international manager of Banco do Brasil (lit. 'Bank of Brazil') and real estate lawyer, and his mother, Thania Campos, was an actress. He is the third of four children. At the age of five, Campos left Brazil with his family. He spent parts of his childhood in Canada, Bahrain, and the United States due to his father's career. His family returned to Brazil when Campos was fourteen, but he decided to stay in the United States to finish his studies, since he could barely speak Portuguese and did not know much about Brazilian culture at the time. His parents later divorced.

At the age of nine, he started acting at a private arts school in Toronto. At the age of thirteen, he played Prince Charming in a school production of Cinderella.

At the age of seventeen, he attended Michigan's Interlochen Arts Academy. He then studied drama at Northwestern University (north of Chicago in Evanston, Illinois), graduating with a bachelor's degree in 1995.

== Acting career ==
In 1995, Campos made his film debut in the Brazilian film O Quatrilho, directed by Fábio Barreto, which was nominated for Best Foreign Language Film at the 1996 Academy Awards. That same year, he played the male lead in William Shakespeare's All's Well That Ends Well, directed by Tony Award winner Mary Zimmerman at the Goodman Theatre in Chicago. In 1997, he played Jimmy Santadio on the CBS miniseries The Last Don, based on the novel of the same name by Mario Puzo.

From there, he became better known to American audiences for his roles as Diego on the NBC sitcom Jesse, starring Christina Applegate; as attorney Joe Rivera in the Showtime series Leap Years; and for a recurring guest role as Dr. Eddie Dorset on ER.

In 2004, he joined the cast of FX's medical drama Nip/Tuck playing plastic surgeon Quentin Costa, who is later revealed to be The Carver, one of the two main antagonists of the show's third season. In 2006, he guest starred in Cold Case.

In 2009, he guest starred in the television series Numb3rs and Castle. That same year, he voiced the character of Prince Naveen in the Disney animated film The Princess and the Frog, which went on to be nominated for three Academy Awards. He reprised his role in the 2011 video game Kinect: Disneyland Adventures. In 2024, he reprised the role in the attraction Tiana's Bayou Adventure at Magic Kingdom and Disneyland.

In 2010, he made guest appearances such as on the supernatural television series Ghost Whisperer; on the medical drama Private Practice, on season 3 episode 15, playing the brief boyfriend of Charlotte King who is accused of abusing OxyContin; and also had a recurring role during the first season of the comedy-drama series Royal Pains as Charlie Casey, the ex-husband of one of the lead characters, Jill Casey. He last appeared on the police procedural series The Closer as Dr. Luis Navarro in the episode "Heart Attack" from season 6.

== Legal career ==
In the early 2010s, Campos stopped doing television and film work and enrolled in law school at the University of Michigan, receiving his J. D. in 2013. While in law school, he held an internship with Judge Avern Cohn of the United States District Court for the Eastern District of Michigan.

After graduating, he passed the bar in New York and worked as an associate with the law firm Morgan, Lewis & Bockius. According to his profile, his work has involved "complex insurance recovery matters", as well as "claims presentation and mediation through disputes in courts and arbitrations." In 2024, he was with the firm Covington & Burling as an associate. In 2026, he was listed as senior counsel for the firm Harris Beach Murtha.

== Personal life ==
From 1997 to 1999, Campos was in a relationship with actress Paula Marshall, whom he met on the set of the NBC sitcom Chicago Sons. Campos married a psychologist named Karina in 2000, with whom he has two children.

== Filmography ==
Film
Year	Title	Role	Notes
1995	O Quatrilho	Massimo	
2001	Mimic 2	Det. Klaski	
2003	Dopamine	Winston	
2005	Blue Moon	Fiorio	Short film
2005	Cold Feet	Joe	
2005	Crazylove	Michael	
2009	Wake	Varrnez	
2009	The Princess and the Frog	Prince Naveen	Voice

Television
Year	Title	Role	Notes
1996	Você Decide	Basílio	Episode: "Marcas do Passado"
1997	Chicago Sons	Raoul	Episode: "Infrequent Flyers"
1997	Suddenly Susan	Carlos Rivera	Episode: "A Boy Like That"
1997	The Last Don	Jimmy Santadio	TV mini-series
1997	Total Security	Unknown	Episode: "Pilot"
1998	Cybill	Gianni	Episode: "Don Gianni"
1998–2000	Jesse	Diego Vasquez	42 episodes
2001	Resurrection Blvd.	Joseph Marquez	3 episodes
2001–2002	Leap Years	Joe Rivera	Main role; 20 episodes
2002	Miss Miami	Unknown	TV movie – Alt. title: "Miami Jonez" USA
2003	Will & Grace	Anton	Episode: "Fagmalion Part 4: The Guy Who Loved Me"
2003	ER	Dr. Eddie Dorset	5 episodes
2004	The D.A.	Dep. Dist. Atty. Mark Camacho	4 episodes
2004	Boston Legal	A.D.A. Mark Wills	Episode: "Questionable Characters"
2004–2005	Nip/Tuck	Dr. Quentin Costa	16 episodes
2006	The Wedding Album	Tony Zutto	Main role
2006	Cold Case	Ramon Delgado	Episode: "Lonely Hearts"
2008	Night Life	Dr. Steve Larouche	TV movie
2008	CSI: Crime Scene Investigation	Randy Hopper	Episode: "The Happy Place"
2009	Numb3rs	Randall Nespola	Episode: "Sneakerhead"
2009	Castle	Calvin Creason	Episode: "Hell Hath No Fury"
2009	Royal Pains	Charlie Casey	4 episodes
2010	Ghost Whisperer	Vernon Dokes	Episode: "Living Nightmare"
2010	Private Practice	Dr. Scott	Episode: "'Til Death Do Us Part"
2010	The Closer	Dr. Luis Navarro	Episode: "Heart Attack"

Video games
Year	Title	Role	Notes
2011	Kinect: Disneyland Adventures	Prince Naveen	voice

Theme parks
Year	Title	Role	Notes
2024	Tiana's Bayou Adventure	Prince Naveen	voice (preshow)

== Theatre ==
Year	Title	Author	Director	Notes
1995	All's Well That Ends Well	William Shakespeare	Mary Zimmerman	Goodman Theatre

== Awards and nominations ==
Year	Award	Category	Work	Result	Ref.
1999	ALMA Awards	Outstanding Actor in a Comedy Series	Jesse	Won	
2000	ALMA Awards	Outstanding Actor in a Drama Series	Jesse	Nominated	
2010	Black Reel Awards	Best Ensemble	The Princess and the Frog	Nominated	
