= Antônio Prado historic center =

Coordinates: 28.8577°S 51.2834°W

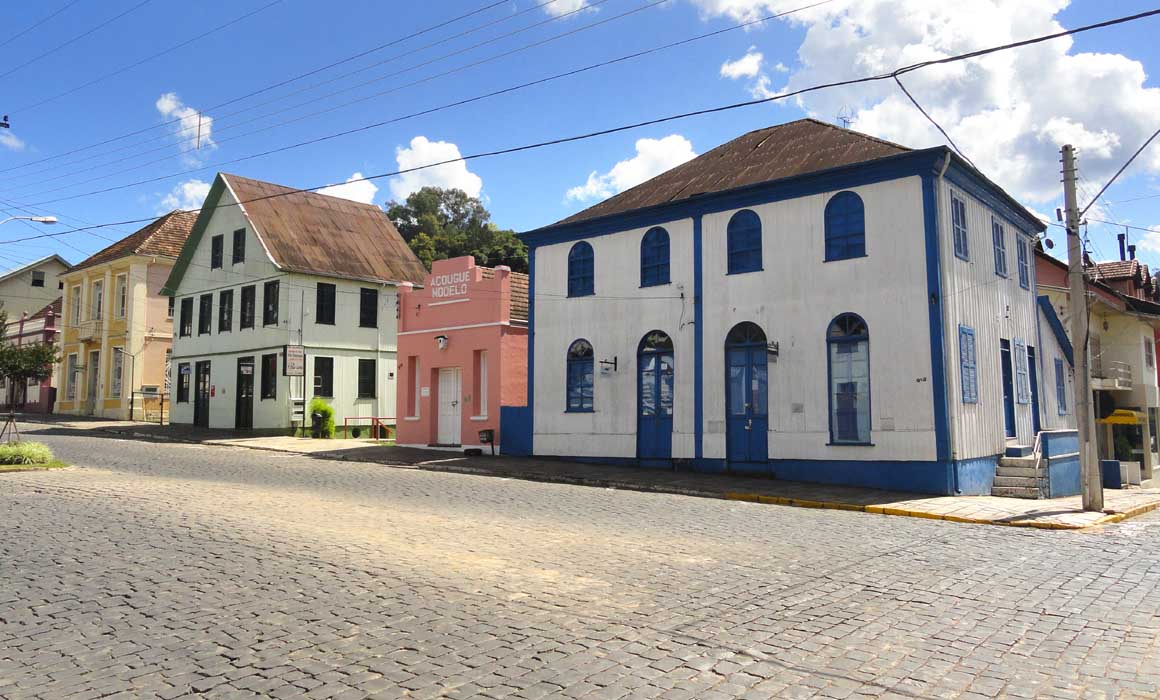
Historic Center of Antônio Prado, stretch of Avenida Valdomiro Bocchese.

The Historic Center of Antônio Prado, a Brazilian city in the state of Rio Grande do Sul, preserves a rich historical heritage dating back to its origins. Antônio Prado was founded in 1886, primarily by Italian immigrants, and soon became a bustling commercial hub. However, in the 20th century, it underwent a decline, which was, nevertheless, instrumental in preserving the largest and most significant urban architectural ensemble of Italian colonization in Brazil, designated as a historical and artistic landmark by the National Institute of Historic and Artistic Heritage.

== History ==
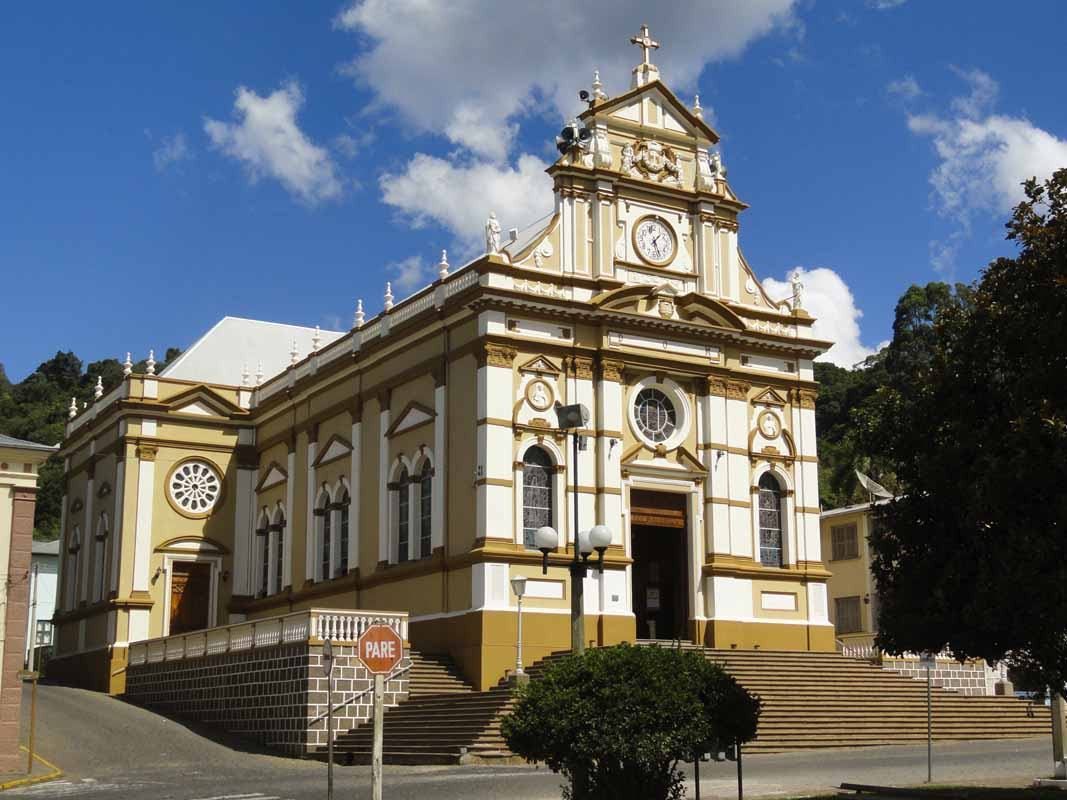
Main Church Sacred Heart of Jesus. Built from 1891 to 1897, it was renovated in 1899 and between 1925 and 1928.

The first records of Antônio Prado date back to the late 19th century when the northeastern region of the state was being colonized by European immigrants, encouraged by the federal government. The first white men to leave their mark in the area were Polish, Russian, and Swedish immigrants who, in 1880, opened a road there as they moved towards the Upper Uruguay region. In the same year, a São Paulo native named Simão David de Oliveira settled at the mouth of the Leão River and Tigre Stream, which became known as Passo do Simão. Shortly after, he built a large wooden shed. The idea of creating a colonial nucleus in Antônio Prado is confirmed by a document from April 29, 1885, and the following year, land demarcations began. The project, dated May 14, 1886, is considered the official founding of the city, which would receive around two thousand Italian immigrants.

These immigrants were generally poor and faced significant challenges in their settlement. The government provided little assistance, the region was still covered in virgin forest, and its terrain was very rugged. Nevertheless, the settlement soon became an important regional trade center. Em 1890 a colônia foi anexada a Vacaria, mas seu rápido crescimento justificou a emancipação em 12 de fevereiro de 1899, por ordem do Presidente do Estado Borges de Medeiros. In 1890, the colony was annexed to Vacaria, but its rapid growth justified its emancipation on February 12, 1899, by order of the State President Borges de Medeiros.

Over the years, the city became relatively isolated, a situation accentuated by the construction of the BR 116 highway in the 1930s, which bypassed the area and became one of the most important connections between the state and the rest of Brazil. This isolation led to a process of decline and stagnation for the city but preserved many of its original characteristics.

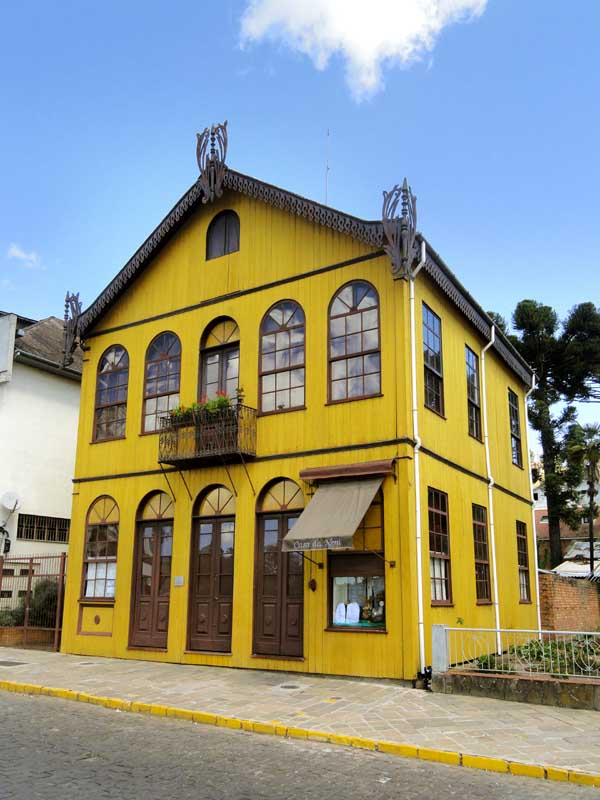
Antonio Bocchese's house, known as Neni's House, built in 1910.

=== Listing ===
The importance of colonial architectural heritage in Rio Grande do Sul was recognized in the 1970s by the National Institute of Historic and Artistic Heritage (IPHAN), which requested action from the state government to safeguard it. A project was created, joined by other researchers and cultural centers in the state, and in 1983, a working group led by researcher Ana Meira was established.

The group identified about 30 German and Italian immigration nuclei in the state, conducting characterization studies. The Italian nucleus of Antônio Prado was considered the largest and best-preserved, receiving priority treatment. At the time, colonial heritage was not yet valued by the general population, and there was an imminent risk of degradation and destruction. Much had already been lost. There was also a rich collection of intangible culture to be studied and preserved in the city, especially the linguistic aspect, as one of the largest national centers for the Talian dialect, still spoken by about 90% of residents over 30 years old.

Shortly thereafter, the owner of one of the most emblematic residences in the city, Neni's House, requested its listing. This had a positive impact, encouraging those interested in the city's heritage to take more effective action to protect the entire surviving group of historical buildings. These actions ultimately resulted in the listing by IPHAN, in 1987, of a group of 48 buildings in the city's central area, not without resistance from the population. Many directly affected individuals believed that their interests would be harmed by the listing, requiring intensive heritage education efforts for the residents. The listing included a green area for permanent preservation in the surroundings. IPHAN also organized an exhibition at the Paço Imperial in Rio de Janeiro, which included a model of the historic center, to enhance and promote that collection. Other activities to rescue memory and documentation consolidated the historic center and its traditions, and today the population, in general, takes pride in its heritage and contributes to its conservation. The historic center was one of the settings for the acclaimed Brazilian film "O Quatrilho," directed by Fábio Barreto and based on the eponymous book by José Clemente Pozenato. In the words of Ana Meira,

"Young adults today, who have gone through the experience of heritage education, see Antônio Prado differently. Children too. A good example was given in a master's thesis on art education, developed by a teacher who worked with Prado's children for two years. As a final exercise, she asked the children to draw and describe an ideal city. In all the drawings, what appears is Antônio Prado. And one of the children said he wanted to live in a city with a shopping center, intercoms, and... listed houses!"

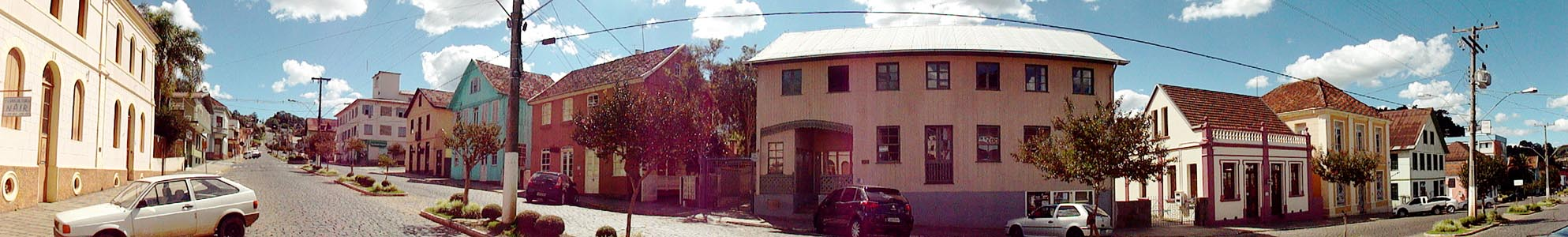
Section of Avenida Valdomiro Bocchese in the Historic Center.

== Architecture ==
The historic center is defined by a rectangular square and surrounding streets, with buildings dating from 1890 to 1940. Among them, there are modern buildings that have replaced older ones. The most intact areas are the quadrangle surrounding the square, which maintains its original configuration almost entirely intact and is home to the church and the City Hall. The Valdomiro Bocchese Avenue also contains several original continuous stretches and isolated examples. Many of these buildings have two or more stories, serving as residences on the upper levels and housing businesses and other activities on the ground floor. Most of them were constructed from wood, representing exemplary instances of Italian colonial architecture in the state and illustrating the economic cycle of the Araucaria tree, a native pine in southern Brazil known for its high-quality wood. However, a few were built with masonry, notably the Sacred Heart of Jesus Church, Palombini Pharmacy, and the City Hall, which also display distinct stylistic features from the rest.

The architecture produced by the immigrants stands out in the Brazilian context and differs in various plastic and technical aspects from the architecture of Italian rural villages. Antônio Prado's architectural heritage falls into the third phase of Italian colonial architecture, characterized as the peak phase, according to the analysis of historian Júlio Posenato. This phase is defined by the permanent nature of the buildings, moving beyond the initial phases when buildings were generally provisional and much more rustic, stripped of almost all ornamentation. It is also characterized by greater knowledge and mastery of the properties of Araucaria wood and the significance that these buildings acquired for the community as symbols of work, cultural identity, and self-sufficiency.

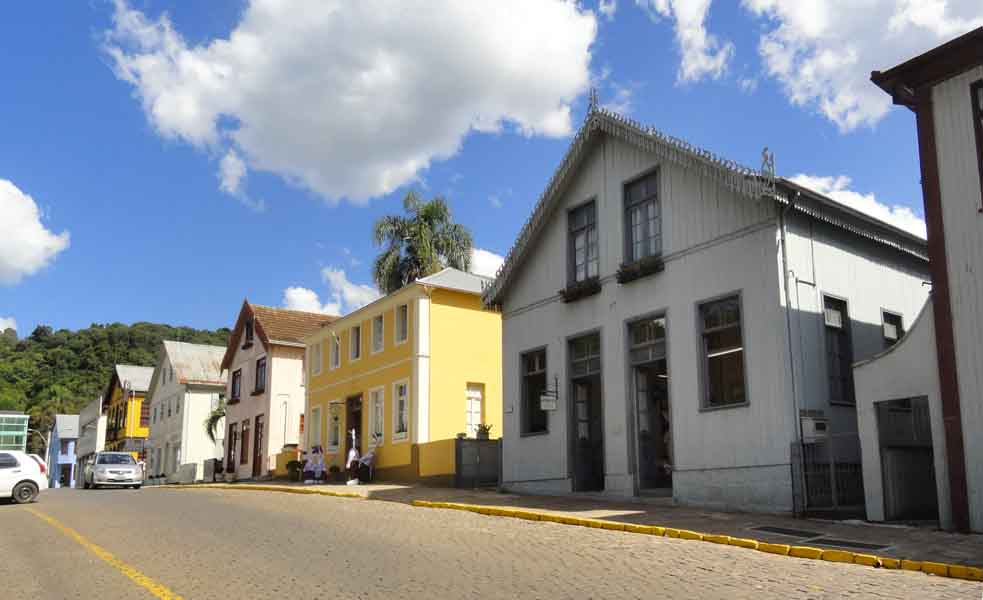
Section of Luíza Bocchese Street.

Its originality lies mainly in the use of regional materials in creative structural and plastic solutions. Most wooden buildings have a structure supported by a framework of beams and pillars that do not require diagonal elements for bracing, taking advantage of the popularization of industrialized nails, which were becoming a widely consumed commodity at that historical moment. Thus, floor and wall planks served simultaneously as enclosures and bracing. The improvement of carpentry and joinery techniques allowed for the construction of spacious multi-story houses adorned with a rich repertoire of decorative elements such as eaves, balustrades, window frames, walkways, balconies, and fretwork, giving them significant aesthetic value, even though the overall appearance is quite austere.

The physical conditions of this ensemble are unequal. Many buildings have suffered some degradation from weathering, termite activity, and changes in their use and have been altered to some extent over time, replacing original and artisanal elements with more modern and industrialized ones. Nevertheless, the ensemble overall preserves remarkable integrity and is in good preservation condition. Today, IPHAN maintains an office in one of the houses in the historic center, monitors restoration work when necessary, and conducts ongoing heritage education and promotion activities.

== Some buildings ==
Sacred Heart of Jesus Mother Church

Built between 1891 and 1897, it replaced a wooden chapel dedicated to Our Lady of the Rosary. By the initiative of Antônio Prado's first priest, Alexandre Pellegrini, the new church was dedicated to the Sacred Heart of Jesus. His successor, Father Carmine Fasulo, ordered the decoration of the building in 1899. The adjacent wooden bell tower dates back to 1912 and supports three bells. The building was renovated between 1925 and 1928, receiving new stained glass windows and a wide access staircase. In the 1950s, its interior was decorated with paintings by the Italian artist Emilio Benvenutto Zanon. The interior features grand altars, important statues, and a wooden pulpit carved by Antonio Busetto.

Neni's House

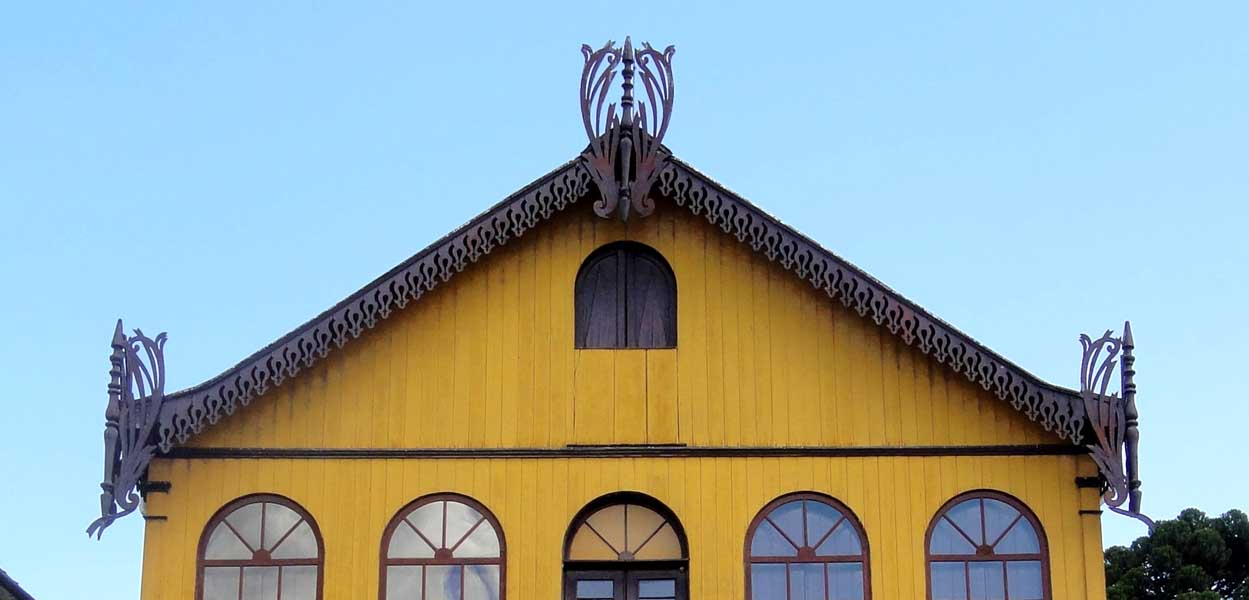
Detail of the lambrequins at Casa da Neni.

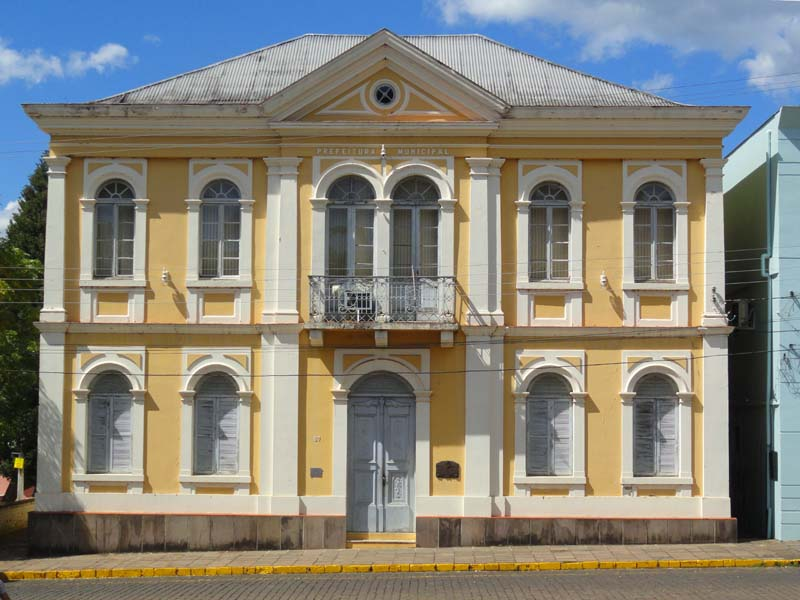
City Hall

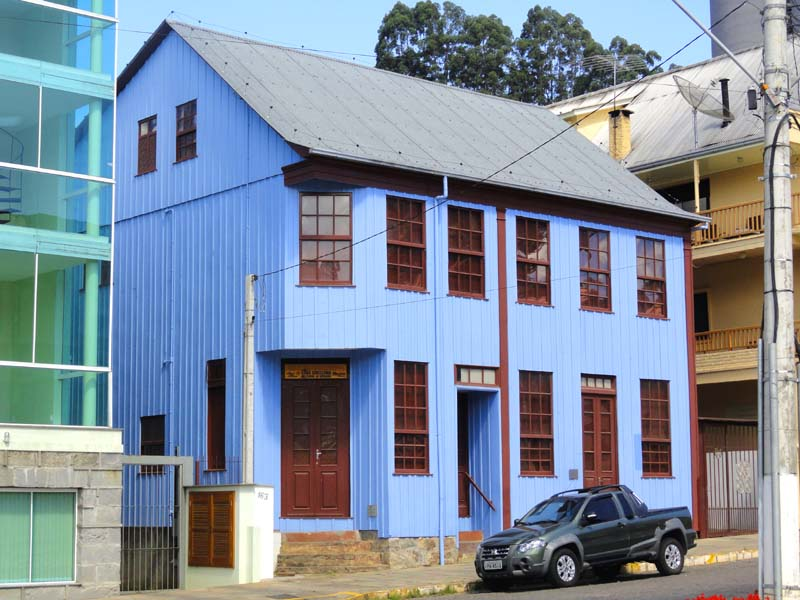
Casa Grezzana.

One of the city's most well-known houses and the first to be listed for protection, Neni's House was built in 1910, over a previous structure, by the goldsmith Antônio Bocchese. He set up his workshop on the ground floor and his residence on the upper floor. His daughter, Joana Magdalena, nicknamed Neni, inherited the house and opened a small retail store selling religious items in her father's former workshop. The store operated for years, known as Neni's House. After Neni died in 1981, the property was acquired by Valdomiro Bocchese, and in 1983, the house was restored. Valdomiro had various businesses and continued to operate a shop on the ground floor. He was also the majority shareholder of Moinho do Nordeste, the largest company in Antônio Prado, and the house's image, with its distinctive fretwork, began to illustrate the products of the mill. In 1986, it was chosen as a symbol for the centenary celebrations of Italian colonization in the city.

City Hall

Constructed with masonry between 1896 and 1900 to be the residence of Vittorio Faccioli, a successful merchant. Vittorio also intended to set up his business on the ground floor. However, it was never used for this purpose and, since 1899, when the city gained autonomy, it was rented to the Municipal Executive to establish its headquarters and a public jail. The first election in Antônio Prado was held there. In 1921, the municipality acquired the property for 40 thousand réis. In 1986, the building underwent significant renovations and expansion at the rear, also housing the City Council, which remained there until 2008.

Grezzana House

The house was built between 1906 and 1915 by Giacomo Grezzana to live with his family. The house had many rooms and also served as a boarding house. One of his sons inherited it and continued to live there, while the ground floor began to house the Municipal Tax Office, where he worked. The house underwent renovations in 1948 and 1952, losing its original cracked wooden roof. Today, it functions as a cultural center.

Paim House

The current building is the result of a major renovation and expansion carried out in 1920 by the Nodari brothers on a modest dwelling dating back to 1918, at the request of its owner, Avelino Paim de Souza. Avelino was a wealthy farmer, a National Guard colonel, and a Municipal Councilor on two occasions. The renovation replaced the original rustic boards with planed planks, added a profusion of fretwork on the façade, a ground floor garage, and an upper floor bathroom, a rare convenience at the time. The house was inherited by his son Laurindo, and over the years, the surrounding land was landscaped.

Pradense Mutual Aid Society

The mansion was built with masonry between 1911 and 1912 as the headquarters of the Società del Mutuo Soccorso Vittorio Emanuelle III, an association for mutual aid among immigrants in medical and social assistance services, as well as offering recreational activities for members and playing a prominent role in the community. It housed Vincenzo Palombini's pharmacy for several years and a Marist school. During World War II, a period of great persecution of Italian descendants in Brazil, the headquarters was invaded by the police, who seized all of its documentation and forced a name change to the current one, Pradense Mutual Aid Society. During the filming of the movie "O Quatrilho," it represented the headquarters of the Intendency.

== Gallery ==
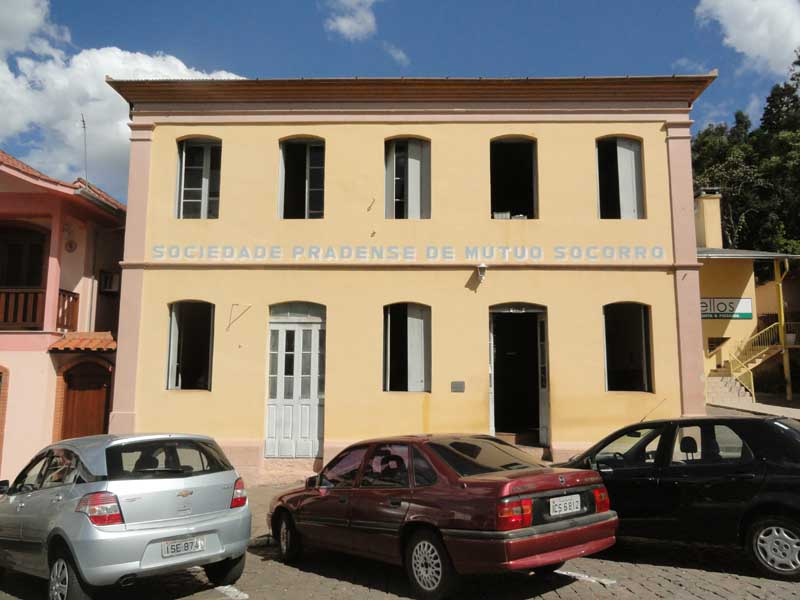
Pradense Mutual Aid Society.

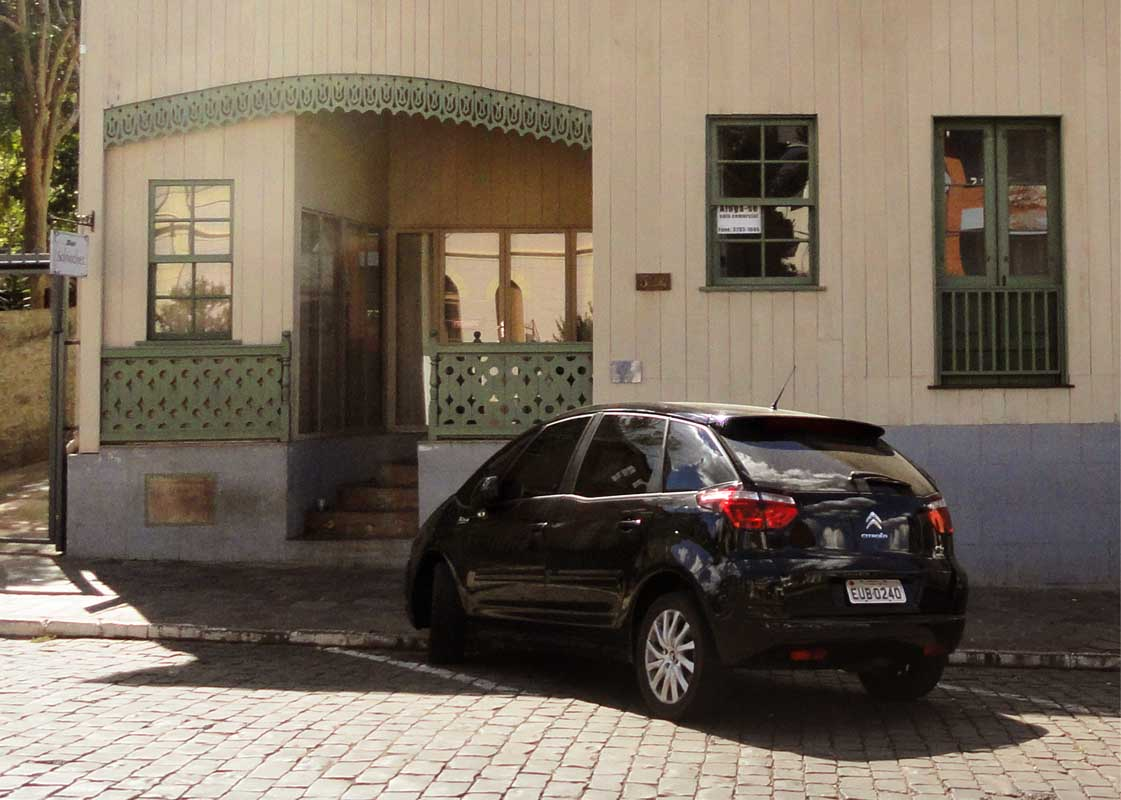
Detail of the entrance to the former Hotel dos Viajantes.

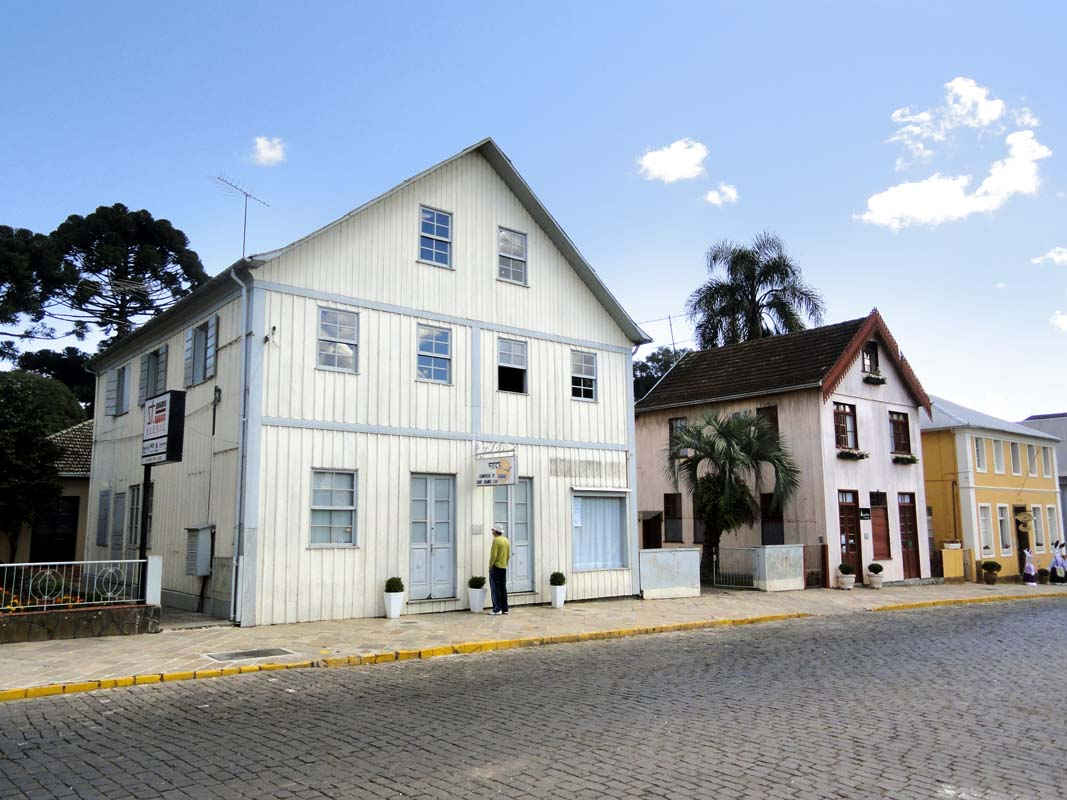
Section of Luíza Bocchese Street.

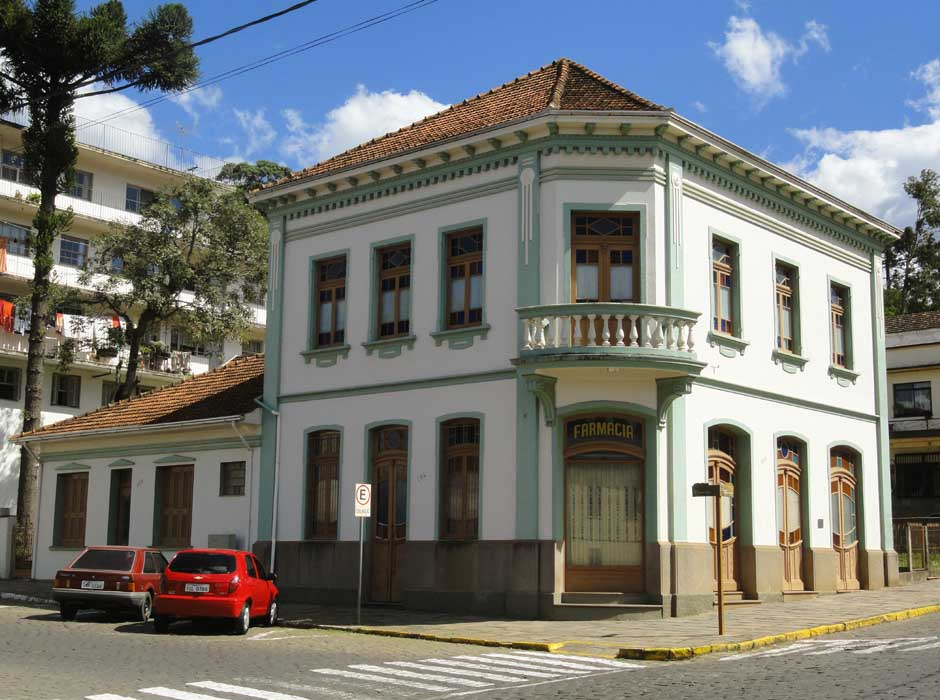
Palombini House and Pharmacy.

== See also ==
- Imigração italiana no Brasil
