= Santa Maria do Suaçuí =

Coordinates: 18°12′S 42°25′W

- Municipality
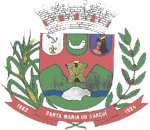
- Flag Coat of arms
- Interactive map of Santa Maria do Suaçuí
- Country: Brazil
- Region: Southeast
- State: Minas Gerais
- Mesoregion: Vale do Rio Doce

Population (2022 Census)
  - Total: 12,788
  - Estimate (2025): 12,817
- Time zone: UTC−3 (BRT)

Santa Maria do Suaçuí is a municipality in the state of Minas Gerais in the Southeast region of Brazil.

== People ==
Santa Maria do Suaçuí is the hometown of Rui Ricardo Dias, which plays Luiz Inácio Lula da Silva in the film Lula, o filho do Brasil.

== See also ==
- List of municipalities in Minas Gerais
