= Memórias do Cárcere =

Memórias do Cárcere may refer to:

- Memórias do Cárcere (Camilo), a 1862 book by Camilo Castelo Branco
- Memórias do Cárcere (Graciliano), a 1953 book by Graciliano Ramos
- Memórias do Cárcere (film), a 1984 film by Nelson Pereira dos Santos
