= Rui Ricardo Diaz =

Brazilian actor (born 1978)

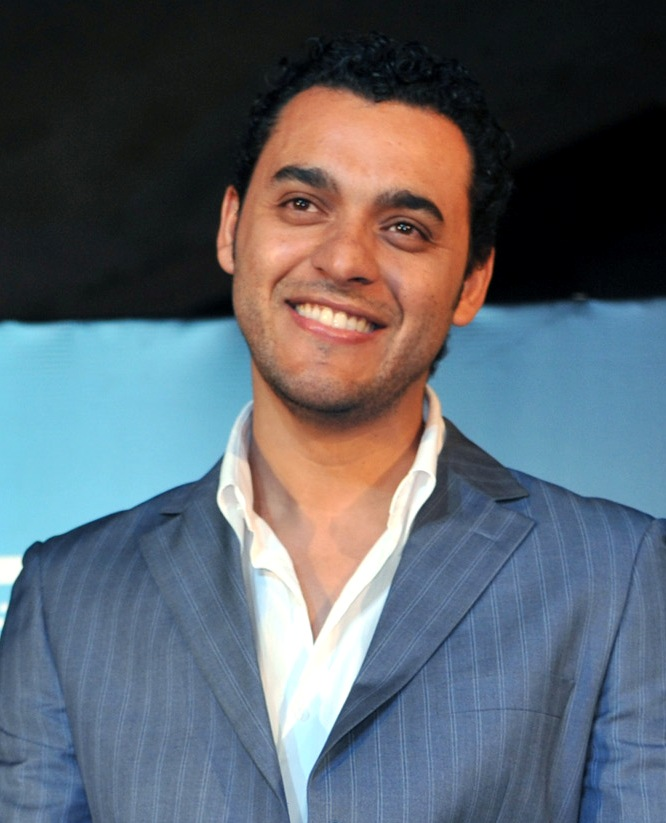
- Rui Ricardo Diaz at the premiere of Lula, o filho do Brasil during the 42nd Festival de Brasília on November 17, 2009.
- Born: December 9, 1978 (age 47); Santa Maria do Suaçuí, Minas Gerais
- Occupation: Actor
- Years active: 1993–present

Rui Ricardo Diaz (born December 9, 1978) is a Brazilian actor. He is best known for his role as President Luiz Inácio Lula da Silva from ages 18 to 35 in Fábio Barreto's Lula, o filho do Brasil.

== Career ==
Diaz was born in Santa Maria do Suaçuí, Minas Gerais. He acted in small roles in São Paulo theatrical productions since he was 16 years old, and graduated in theater from the Pontifical Catholic University of São Paulo. Before he landed the lead role in Lula, o filho do Brasil, Diaz performed to an average audience of 20 people.

For Lula, o filho do Brasil Diaz auditioned for small parts such as a nurse and a unionized worker. Then, Tay Lopez, who was cast as Lula, announced that he was leaving for medical reasons. Diaz was then invited to do a screen test for the lead role. According to him, it was the scene of one of Lula's first speeches that landed him the lead role. He had to gain 22 pounds (10 kilograms) and grow a beard for the role.

== Filmography ==
- 2010 – Lula, o filho do Brasil
- 2025 – Anaconda
