= Resumption Cinema =

Period of Brazilian film production 1995–2002

The term Resumption Cinema (in Portuguese: Cinema da Retomada) refers to the period of revitalization of Brazilian film production between 1995 and 2002, marked by the restructuring of development policies after the serious crisis caused by the closure of Embrafilme, in 1990, by the government of Fernando Collor de Mello. The extinction of the state-owned company, the main source of financing and distribution for national cinema, resulted in a near paralysis of film production in Brazil. In 1992, only one Brazilian feature film was released on the commercial circuit, highlighting the seriousness of the situation.

Subsequently, from the middle of that decade onwards, Brazilian cinema once again became relevant on the international scene, with successful productions such as O Quatrilho (1995), Four Days in September (1997), Central Station (1998) and City of God (2002), all of them nominated for various international awards, such as the Academy Awards.
