= Fenamassa =

National Pasta Festival held in the municipality of Antônio Prado

FenaMassa

FenaMassa or National Pasta Festival is a Brazilian fair and community celebration held every two years in Antônio Prado, commemorating the culture, history, and agro-industrial production of the city and the region.

The event takes place in Garibaldi Square, where local industries participate, showcasing a wide variety of regional products with Italian heritage. The event includes a guided tour of Antônio Prado's Historic Center, which features 48 preserved buildings, as well as key points related to Italian immigration, such as the Colonial Mill Francescatto.

== Edições da FenaMassa ==
Edições da FenaMassa
| Nº | years | Observation |
|---|---|---|
| 1ª | 2012 | |
| 2ª | 2013 | |
| 3ª | 2014 | |
| 4ª | 2015 | |
| 5ª | 2017 | |
| 6ª | 2019 | |
| 7ª | *2022 | "Out of date" |
| 8ª | 2023 | |

=== Notas: ===
a: Postponed due to COVID-19 pandemic

=== FenaMassa 2012 (1st Edition) ===
Twenty organizations in Antônio Prado came together to create an event that emphasized the Italian heritage present in the municipality, aiming to boost tourism in the city. Qualification courses were invested in to prepare local residents to participate in the event as waiters and guides.

=== FenaMassa 2019 ===
Taking place between November 8 and 24, the 6th edition of the event was the second largest, with 30,000 people attending. They were mainly attracted by the addition of games to the event's catalog, such as the competition for the Largest Tortéi Eater and the Wheelbarrow Race.

=== FenaMassa 2022 ===
The festival attracted an impressive crowd of 35,000 people over the course of 11 days, a number that surpassed the previous 2019 edition. After a pause due to the pandemic, the cultural event brought an abundance of culinary options to the heart of Antônio Prado's Historic Center. A total of 80 varieties of pasta dishes from five different establishments were presented, serving approximately 12,000 meals to eager visitors looking to savor Italian cuisine.

=== FenaMassa 2023 ===
The event takes place from November 3 to 19 with a schedule of activities, including shows, cooking workshops, contests, presentations, Colonial games, and more.
