= Nova Roma do Sul =

Municipality in Rio Grande do Sul, Brazil

Coordinates: 28.99°S 51.407778°W

- Municipality
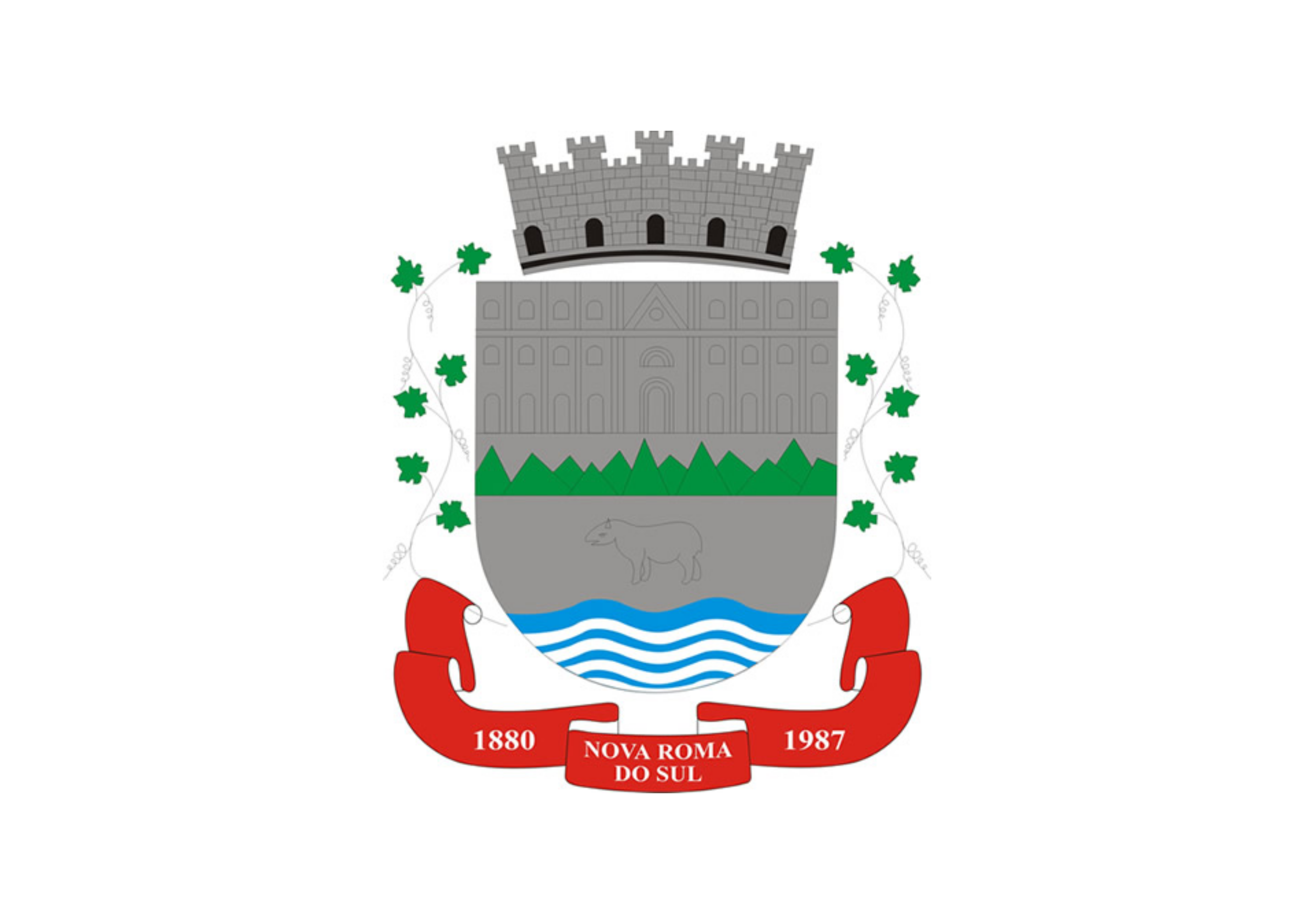
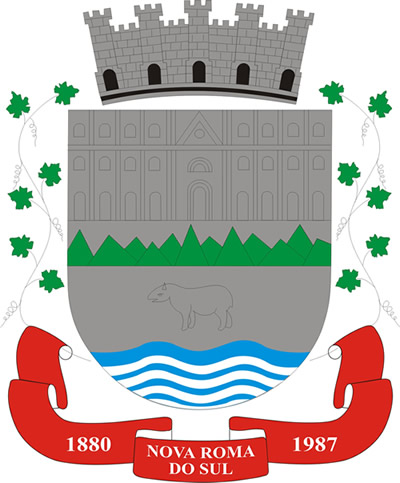
- Flag Coat of arms
- Interactive map of Nova Roma do Sul
- Country: Brazil
- Time zone: UTC−3 (BRT)

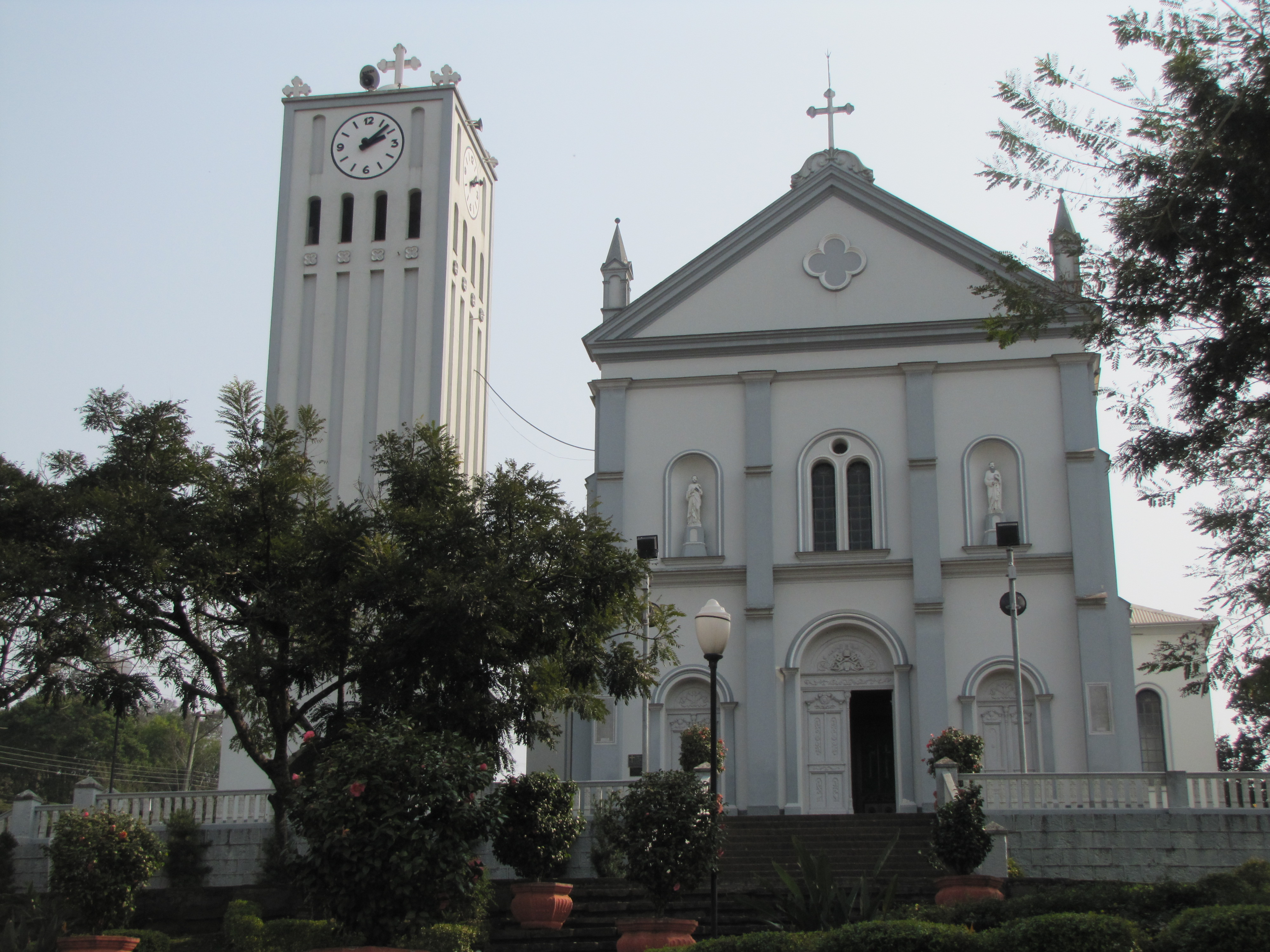
Mother Church of Nova Roma do Sul.

Nova Roma do Sul (a Portuguese name meaning New Rome of the South) is a municipality in the state of Rio Grande do Sul, Brazil. It had a population of 3,717 persons, as of 2020. It was first settled in 1880 by immigrant families of Polish, Russian and Swedish origins. In 1885, Italian immigrants arrived, mostly from Belluno, Treviso and Vicenza, in Veneto. The Italians named it Nova Roma do Sul in honor to the capital of Italy. During World War II, the town's name was changed to Guararapes, because Brazil broke off diplomatic relations with Italy, and it was prohibited to use names with references to the Axis powers. Later, the original name of the town returned.

According to the Brazilian Census of 2000, Nova Roma do Sul is the town with the highest percentage of self-reported Roman Catholics in the country. In the Census, the entire population reported to follow Catholicism.

== See also ==
- List of municipalities in Rio Grande do Sul
