= Felipe Adão =

Brazilian footballer (born 1985)

Personal information
- Full name: Felipe Barreto Adão
- Date of birth: 26 November 1985 (age 40)
- Place of birth: Rio de Janeiro, Brazil
- Height: 1.88 m (6 ft 2 in)
- Position: Forward

Team information
- Current team: Bangu

Youth career
- 1994–1996: CFZ
- 1997–1998: Flamengo
- 1999–2005: Vasco da Gama

Senior career*
Years	Team	Apps	(Gls)
2004	Figueirense	10	(7)
2005–2006	Botafogo	30	(16)
2007	Atlético Goianiense	20	(12)
2007–2008	Luzern	16	(10)
2008	Boavista	23	(8)
2009	Marília	25	(15)
2011	America-RJ	20	(9)
2011	Vitória da Conquista	8	(6)
2011	Guarani	10	(5)
2012	Serrano-BA	8	(5)
2013	Independiente del Valle	12	(6)
2014	XV de Piracicaba	3	(0)
2014	Anyang	23	(3)
2015	Dibba Al-Fujairah		
2015	Dubai CSC		
2016	Tigres do Brasil	0	(0)
2016	Al-Wehda		
2019	Bangu	0	(0)
- * Club domestic league appearances and goals

Felipe Barreto Adão (born 26 November 1985) is a Brazilian footballer who currently plays as forward.

He made his Brazilian Série A debut in 2006 and earned a contract from Switzerland. However, he then returned to Brazil for lower divisions.

== Football career ==
Son of Cláudio Adão, he started his professional career at Figueirense, where he signed a three-month deal on 9 May 2005. He then left for Botafogo on 1 September 2005. He was signed by Atlético Goianiense in March 2007 until the end of 2007 Campeonato Goiano.

On 19 June 2007, he was signed by Luzern of the Swiss Super League, but was released in the winter transfer window. In August 2008 he was signed by Boavista. He left the club as the team was eliminated from the second stage of 2008 Campeonato Brasileiro Série C. In September, he joined Marília until the end of the 2008 Campeonato Brasileiro Série B season.

In January 2009, he was re-signed by Boavista for 2009. However, he was released in April.

In January 2011 he was signed by America-RJ for 2011. In March, he left for Vitória da Conquista until the end of 2011.

On 25 May 2011 he signed a deal with Guarani on free transfer after his contract with Vitória da Conquista had expired.

In February 2014 Adao joined K League Challenge side FC Anyang.
