= Domingos Olímpio =

Brazilian novelist, journalist and playwright

- A photograph depicting Olímpio
- Born: Domingos Olímpio Braga Cavalcanti; 18 September 1851; Sobral, Ceará, Brazil
- Died: 7 October 1906 (aged 55); Rio de Janeiro City, Rio de Janeiro, Brazil
- Education: Faculdade de Direito do Recife
- Occupations: diplomat, novelist, playwright, journalist, lawyer
- Writing career
- Pen name: Pojucã
- Notable work: Luzia-Homem
- Movement: Naturalism

Domingos Olímpio Braga Cavalcanti (September 18, 1851 – October 7, 1906) was a Brazilian novelist, journalist and playwright, famous for his Naturalist novel Luzia-Homem.

== Life ==
Olímpio was born in the city of Sobral, in the State of Ceará, in 1857. Graduated in Law at the Faculdade de Direito do Recife, he exercised journalistic career in Recife, Belém and Rio de Janeiro, working for newspapers such as O Comércio, Jornal do Commercio, Correio do Povo, José do Patrocínio's A Cidade do Rio, Gazeta de Notícias and O País. Writing under the pen name Pojucã, he was the director of the periodic Os Anais, where he published many books under feuilleton form, such as O Almirante and the unfinished O Uirapuru.

He also lived with his family in the United States, working at the Brazilian embassy in Washington during the Grover Cleveland government, when the Brazilian borders with Argentina were fixed. Two of his seven children were born during this mission.

Olímpio would try to join the Brazilian Academy of Letters, but Mário de Alencar was accepted in his place instead. Only Olavo Bilac would support Olímpio in his attempt.

== Works ==
=== Novels ===
- Luzia-Homem (1903)
- O Almirante
- O Uirapuru (unfinished)

=== Theatre plays ===
- A Perdição (1874)
- Rochedos que Choram
- Túnica Nessus
- Tântalo
- Um Par de Galhetas
- Os Maçons e o Bispo
- Domitila

=== Miscellaneous ===
- História da Missão Especial de Washington
- A Questão do Acre
- A Loucura na Política
