= Vila Flores =

Municipality in Rio Grande do Sul, Brazil

Coordinates: 28°54′S 51°34′W

- Flowers Ville
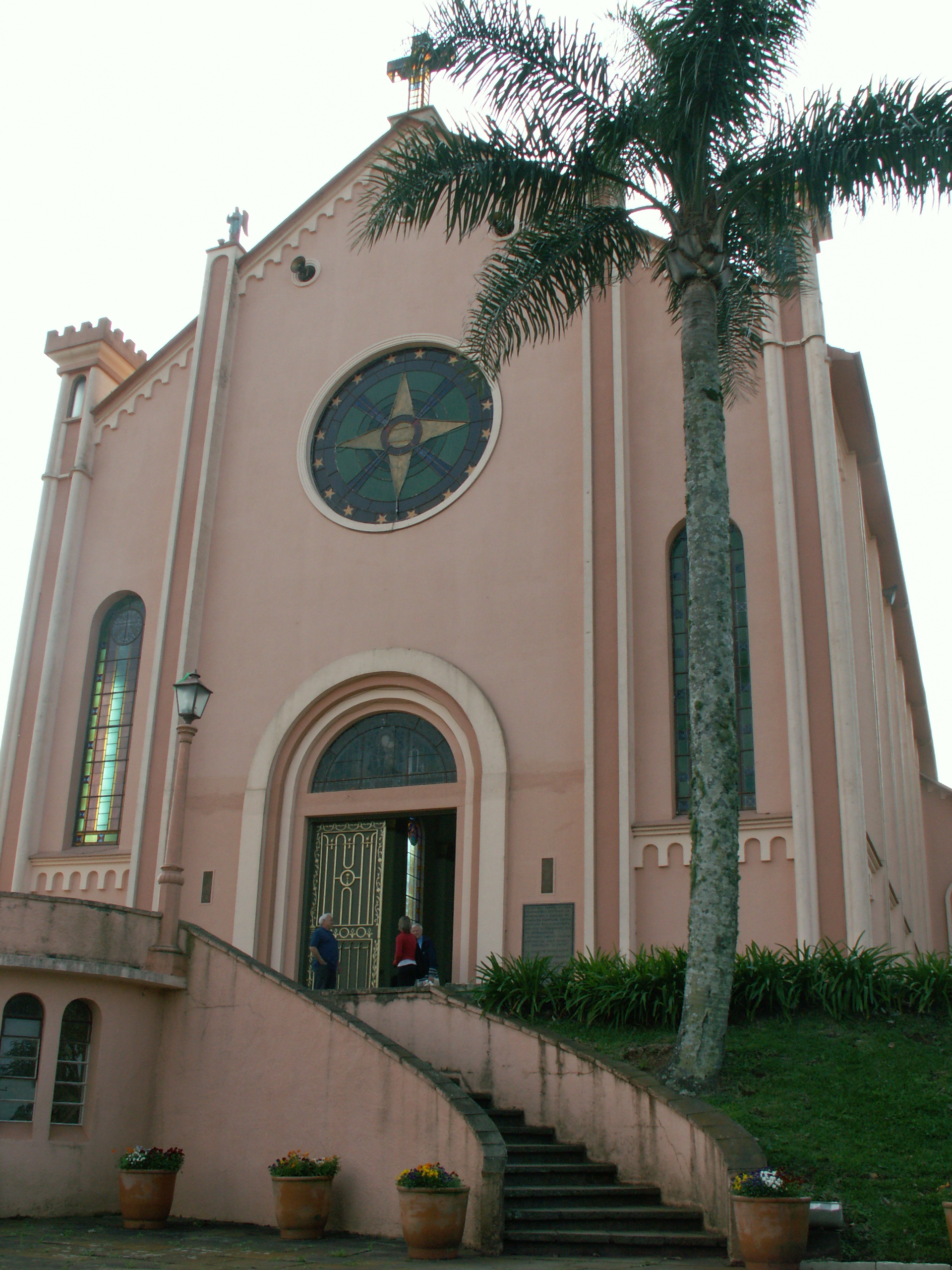

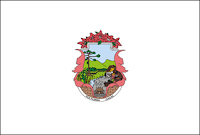
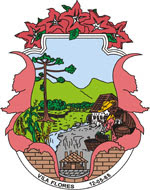
- Flag Coat of arms
- Anthem: s:Hino do município de Vila Flores
- Founded: 1988-05-12

Government
  - Mayor: Evandro Antônio Brandalise (MDB)

Area
  - Total: 107.652 km^{2} (41.565 sq mi)

Population
  - Total: 3,407
- Demonym: vilaflorense
- Postal code: 95334-000
- Area code: +55 54

Vila Flores is a municipality in the state of Rio Grande do Sul, Brazil. As of 2020, the estimated population was 3,396.

== History ==
Vila Flores was located along the path of the tropeiros who transported their cattle to Lagoa Vermelha, using an old pine tree that caught fire in a controlled burn as a reference point. The area was known as Pinheiro Seco.

Around 1884, the chapel of Santo Antônio de Pádua emerged, along with the construction of some houses. Its intermediate position between Alfredo Chaves (now Veranópolis) and Capoeiras (now Nova Prata) allowed it to become a resting place for carters who passed through for rest and meals.

On 15 January 1898, the Alfredo Chaves Colony separated from Lagoa Vermelha and was elevated to the status of a municipality, also encompassing Monte Vêneto (Cotiporã), Bela Vista (Fagundes Varela), Vista Alegre do Prata, Pinheiro Seco (Vila Flores), Nova Bassano, and Capoeiras (Nova Prata).

In 1920, Pinheiro Seco was renamed Vila Flores, in honor of the Fiori family, one of the first families to settle there, initiating various businesses.

The district was created with the name Vila Flores, by Municipal Law No. 240, of 30 Sep 1955, with territory separated from the district of Fagundes Varela, subordinate to the municipality of Veranópolis. Elevated to the status of a municipality with the name Vila Flores, by State Law No. 8,627, of 5 December 1988.

== Geography ==
It is located at a latitude of 28°51'46" south and a longitude of 51°32'00" west, at an altitude of 743 meters. Its population according to the 2010 census was 3,207 inhabitants.

The relief is typical of the Upper Northeastern Slope Region, formed by a large number of hills and crossed by the Prata rivers in a north-south direction; by the Retiro stream in a northwest direction; and by the Jabuticaba stream in a north-south direction. The soil is a source of basalt, which serves as a means of economic production.

== Sister cities ==
- Italy Arsiè, Belluno, Italy

== See also ==
- List of municipalities in Rio Grande do Sul
- Grape and Wine region
