= Fábio Barreto =

Brazilian film director

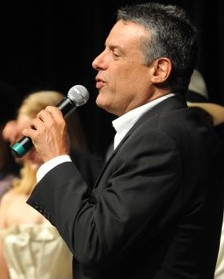
- Barreto during the premiere of Lula, Son of Brazil at the 2009 Brasília Film Festival
- Born: Fábio Villela Barreto Borges; June 6, 1957; Rio de Janeiro, Rio de Janeiro, Brazil
- Died: November 20, 2019 (aged 62); Rio de Janeiro, Rio de Janeiro, Brazil
- Occupations: Film director, film producer, screenwriter, actor
- Years active: 1977–2009
- Spouse: Déborah Kalume (m. 2003)
- Children: 3
- Relatives: Bruno Barreto (brother)

Fábio Villela Barreto Borges (June 6, 1957 – November 20, 2019) was a Brazilian filmmaker, actor, screenwriter, and film producer. He was best known for directing O Quatrilho (which was the first Brazilian film nominated for the Academy Award for Best Foreign Language Film in more than 30 years) and Lula, Son of Brazil, a biography based on President Luiz Inácio Lula da Silva's early life, which had been the most expensive film in the history of Brazilian cinema upon its release. Barreto slipped into a coma in 2009 after being involved in a car accident in Rio de Janeiro and, in August 2014, was reported to be in a minimally conscious state. He died on November 20, 2019, after almost 10 years in a coma.

== Biography ==
Barreto was born on 1957 in Rio de Janeiro. He was the youngest son of well-known movie producers Luís Carlos and Lucy Barreto. His brother is the fellow filmmaker Bruno Barreto, responsible for the 1976 international box office hit Dona Flor and Her Two Husbands, starring Sônia Braga.

=== Career ===
He started his career in 1977, at age 20, directing the short subject A estória de José e Maria. Since then, he acted in two films — Nelson Pereira dos Santos' Memoirs of Prison (1984), and his father's For All: Springboard to Victory (1997) — and directed nine feature films, the Brazilian version of Desperate Housewives, an episode of TV series Você Decide and two other short films.

His first feature was India, Daughter of the Sun, starring Glória Pires as a Native Brazilian who tries to survive the brutality of diamond mining in Central-Western Brazil and ends up falling in love with a white soldier. The film score was composed by Caetano Veloso, whom Barreto would later criticize for calling Lula "illiterate". In 1986 he directed O Rei do Rio, based on a play by Dias Gomes, which tells the story of two friends who enrich through illegal gambling game jogo do bicho and became rivals in the struggle for political power. Both films featured Nuno Leal Maia as the leading male star.

His next film was Luzia-Homem, based on the novel of the same name by 19th-century writer Domingos Olímpio. It featured Claudia Ohana as a masculinized woman seeking revenge for the murder of her parents, which ends up finding love. In 1991, following the Lambada dance craze, he directed a film about it. After a four-year hiatus, he directed O Quatrilho, the first Brazilian film to be nominated for the Academy Award for Best Foreign Language Film since O Pagador de Promessas, released in 1962. In 1997 he directed his first English language film, Bela Donna (released in the United States as White Dunes), starring Natasha Henstridge and Andrew McCarthy.

In 2002 he directed his seventh film, the critically acclaimed A Paixão de Jacobina. He would only return to directing a few years later, releasing Nossa Senhora de Caravaggio and the Brazilian version of Desperate Housewives (filmed in Argentina) in 2007. In 2009 he shot Lula, Son of Brazil. The film, which premiered on January 1, 2010, is his fourth collaboration with Glória Pires. Considered a highly controversial movie at the time of its release, the film was unanimously chosen by a Ministry of Culture commission as Brazil's submission to the 83rd Academy Award for Best Foreign Language Film. The choice was heavy criticized in Brazil and the film failed to get the nomination for that year's Academy Award for Best International Feature Film.

=== Personal life ===
He was married to actress Dora Pellegrino, with whom he had a daughter, Mariana. He was married to actress Déborah Kalume since 2003, with whom he had João (b. 2006). He was also the father of Lucas (with Amanda Martins) and Júlia Barreto Borges (with his first wife, actress Marcia Barreto) who starred in his films Luzia Homem (1987), O Quatrilho (1995), and Nossa Senhora de Caravaggio (2006).

=== Political views ===
In an interview with Cult magazine, Barreto said his film Lula, Son of Brazil did not have any political connotations, and gave his opinion about the president: "Lula represents a revolution within Brazilian society, because he is deeply disturbed over a serious thing that has always existed in Brazil, called inferiority complex [...] So, he is responsible for [...] leaving [the elite] actionless, for showing how the 'enlightened' elite is intellectually colonized. Caetano Veloso, when he calls Lula illiterate, is proving to be a deeply colonized, elitist person. At the same time, you have Obama saying that Lula is 'the man'."

=== Car accident ===
On December 19, 2009, at around 10 p.m. (UTC-3) Barreto was involved in a car accident in Botafogo, a southern neighborhood of Rio de Janeiro. According to firefighter Wagner Generoso, a car came too near to the filmmaker's vehicle, which hit a stone wall, flew to another lane and overturned. He was sent to Hospital Miguel Couto in Leblon, where he faced a three-hour surgery that same night, and later transferred to the Hospital Copa D'Or. On the following day, he was submitted to an operation to reduce the brain swelling. He underwent a tracheostomy to help him breathe. According to the neurosurgeon Paulo Niemeyer Filho, the director had an acute subdural hematoma and a contusion in the temporal lobe on both sides. "The skull's left side was removed and placed in the patient's rib. It will be stored there until it is put back in its place", he said. On March 22, 2010, Barreto was transferred to his house, where his treatment continued.

Several friends of Barreto visited his family in the hospital, such as fellow filmmakers Guel Arraes and Sérgio Rezende, Nossa Senhora de Caravaggio star Cristiana Oliveira, Frei Betto, Glória Pires' husband, singer Orlando Morais, O Quatrilho star Patrícia Pillar, and her husband, former presidential candidate Ciro Gomes. President Lula called the Barreto family to provide solidarity and wish Fábio a quick recovery. On February 3, 2010, Barreto left the intensive care unit of the Hospital Copa D'Or, although he remained unconscious. In August 2014 he was reported to be "minimally conscious" and had responded to some stimuli but had yet to fully emerge from his coma.

=== Death ===
On November 20, 2019, after 10 years in coma, Barreto died in his house in Rio de Janeiro.

== Filmography ==
As director:

- 2009 - Lula, Son of Brazil
- 2007 - Donas de Casa Desesperadas (Brazilian version of Desperate Housewives)
- 2007 - Nossa Senhora de Caravaggio
- 2002 - A Paixão de Jacobina
- 2000 - De Conversa em Conversa (short)
- 1997 - Bela Donna
- 1995 - O Quatrilho
- 1992 - Você Decide (TV series)
- 1988 - Luzia Homem
- 1986 - O Rei do Rio
- 1984 - India, Daughter of the Sun
- 1978 - Mané Garrincha (short)
- 1977 - A Estória de José e Maria (short)

As actor:

- 2006 - Noel: The Samba Poet as Saturno
- 1997 - For All: Springboard to Victory
- 1984 - Memoirs of Prison as Siqueira Campos
