= Memoirs of Prison =

1984 film

- Theatrical release poster
- Directed by: Nelson Pereira dos Santos
- Written by: Nelson Pereira dos Santos
- Based on: Memórias do Cárcere by Graciliano Ramos
- Produced by: Lucy Barreto; Luiz Carlos Barreto; Nelson Pereira dos Santos
- Starring: Carlos Vereza
- Cinematography: José Medeiros; Antonio Luiz Soares
- Edited by: Carlos Alberto Camuyrano
- Production companies: L.C. Barreto Filmes; Regina Filmes
- Distributed by: Embrafilme
- Release dates: May 1984 (Cannes); 18 June 1986
- Running time: 185 minutes
- Country: Brazil
- Language: Portuguese

Memoirs of Prison (Portuguese: Memórias do Cárcere) is a 1984 Brazilian drama film directed by Nelson Pereira dos Santos. It is based on Memórias do Cárcere, an autobiographical novel by Graciliano Ramos, about the period he was a political prisoner during the Estado Novo dictatorship in Brazil.

The film had its world premiere at the Directors Fortnight section of the 1984 Cannes Film Festival, where it won the FIPRESCI Prize. It was selected as the Brazilian entry for the Best Foreign Language Film at the 57th Academy Awards, but was not nominated.

== Cast ==
- Carlos Vereza as Graciliano Ramos
- Glória Pires as Heloísa (Graciliano's wife)
- Nildo Parente as Emanuel
- José Dumont as Mario Pinto
- Wilson Grey as Gaúcho
- Joffre Soares as Soares
- Fábio Barreto as Siqueira Campos
- Jorge Cherques as Dr. Goldberg
- Tonico Pereira as Desidério
- Ada Chaseliov
- Arduíno Colassanti
- Nelson Dantas as prison warden
- Silvio de Abreu
- Cássia Kis
- Marcos Palmeira
- Paulo Porto
- Ney Sant'Anna

== See also ==
- List of submissions to the 57th Academy Awards for Best Foreign Language Film
- List of Brazilian submissions for the Academy Award for Best Foreign Language Film
