= Harris Beach Murtha =

Law Firm in New York State

Harris Beach Murtha Cullina PLLC
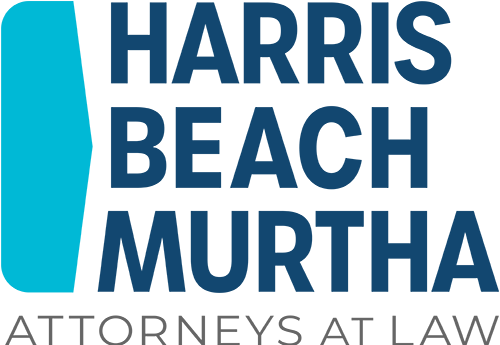
- Headquarters: Rochester, NY
- No. of offices: 17
- No. of attorneys: 250+
- No. of employees: 500+ (including attorneys)
- Key people: Christopher D. Jagel, CEO & Partner
- Date founded: 1856
- Company type: Professional limited liability company
- Website: www.harrisbeachmurtha.com

Harris Beach Murtha is a law firm in the U.S. state of New York, initially founded in 1856, and originally named Ives & Harris. The firm has over 250 lawyers and has offices throughout New York, as well as in Newark, New Jersey and throughout New England. In 2004, it was reported as being "one of the largest law firms in upstate New York, and among the top 250 nationally".

== Origins ==
Around 1851, English immigrant Edward Harris began working for Rochester, New York, attorney Henry Ives. By 1856, Harris had become an attorney, and the two formed the partnership of Ives & Harris. Ives died in 1871, but Harris continued operating under the name until 1884, when his son, Albert Harris, joined the firm, at which point it was renamed, Harris & Harris. Daniel Beach was hired as an attorney in 1905, and by 1907 the firm became known as Harris, Havens, Beach & Harris. The firm went through various other iterations before becoming "Harris, Beach & Wilcox" for an extended period after Charles S. Wilcox left his position in county government to join the firm in 1929. The firm later shortened its name to "Harris Beach".

== Later developments and controversies ==
In 2000, Harris Beach moved its New York City office to the 85th floor of the South Tower at the World Trade Center. At the time of the September 11 attacks, it was the highest floor in the impact zone where United Airlines Flight 175 had struck the tower. Most employees were evacuated but six employees—five lawyers and a construction manager supervising renovations—died. The loss of paper files in the event caused the company to change its IT practices and explore the possibility of entering into a mutual aid agreement with another firm, with each to provide data storage to the other in case of an emergency.

Earlier in 2001, the firm had moved its main headquarters to Perinton, New York. Following the attack, the New York City office was relocated to Fifth Avenue, and in 2007 was again relocated to 100 Wall Street.

In 2004, an investigation by the Rochester Democrat and Chronicle noted that state senator Michael F. Nozzolio, a partner in the firm, was connected to state funding of public projects for which Harris Beach performed lucrative legal work. In 2010, a potential conflict of interest was identified where Harris Beach was chosen as bond counsel for a public project financed in part by the New York Power Authority, which was chaired by another Harris Beach partner.

On January 1, 2025, Harris Beach PLLC and Murtha Cullina LLP combined to form Harris Beach Murtha Cullina PLLC.
