= Lula, Son of Brazil =

2009 film directed by Fábio Barreto

Lula: Son of Brazil
- Brazilian theatrical release poster
- Directed by: Fábio Barreto
- Written by: Denise Paraná; Fábio Barreto; Daniel Tendler; Fernando Bonassi
- Produced by: Luiz Carlos Barreto; Paula Barreto
- Starring: Rui Ricardo Dias; Glória Pires; Cléo Pires; Juliana Baroni; Milhem Cortaz
- Cinematography: Gustavo Hadba
- Edited by: Leticia Giffoni
- Music by: Antonio Pinto
- Production company: Luiz Carlos Barreto Produções Cinematográficas
- Distributed by: Downtown Filmes
- Release dates: November 17, 2009 (Brasília Film Festival); January 1, 2010 (Brazil)
- Running time: 128 minutes
- Country: Brazil
- Language: Portuguese
- Budget: R$17 million
- Box office: $3,785,593

Lula: Son of Brazil (Portuguese: Lula: O Filho do Brasil, pronounced [ˈlulɐ u ˈfiʎu du bɾaˈziw]) is a 2009 biographical Brazilian film based on the early life of Brazilian president Luiz Inácio Lula da Silva. Directed by Fábio Barreto, the film was released on January 1, 2010. Upon its release, Lula, Son of Brazil was the most expensive Brazilian film ever, with a budget of over 17 million reais, being later surpassed by Nosso Lar. The film was unanimously chosen by a Ministry of Culture commission as Brazil's submission to the 83rd Academy Award for Best Foreign Language Film, despite not having been chosen to compete.

The film was a commercial and critical failure. Critics charged that it was election propaganda, fostering a cult of personality.

== Plot ==
The film begins in October 1945 in Garanhuns, a municipality in the countryside of Pernambuco, when Luiz Inácio da Silva, nicknamed Lula, is born as the seventh child of Dona Lindu and Aristides. Two weeks after his birth, Aristides moves to Santos, a coastal city in São Paulo, with Dona Mocinha, a cousin of Dona Lindu. Lindu raises Lula's siblings alone until December 1952, when the family moves to Santos to meet the patriarch. Upon their arrival, Dona Lindu discovers that Aristides had formed a second family with Dona Mocinha.

Aristides' two families live in the same house and, as time goes on, they struggle to survive. Lula and his siblings attend elementary school and work as street vendors. Later, Lindu leaves the alcoholic and abusive Aristides and moves with her children to São Paulo. Lula receives certification as a lathe operator and gets a formal job in the automobile industry, where he loses a finger in a press. This and his brother Ziza's arrest lead him into trade union activism, which made him nationally known in a period when such activities were forbidden. Lula is incarcerated for his activities, just as his mother dies.

== Production ==
Based on the book of the same name by journalist Denise Paraná, the film narrates the story of Lula from his birth until his mother's death, when he was a 35-year-old union leader detained by the political police of the military dictatorship. The screenplay was written by Paraná, Fábio Barreto and Daniel Tendler. Writer Fernando Bonassi was hired to supervise it.

João Miguel, better known for his role in Cinema, Aspirinas e Urubus, was initially cast as Lula, but declined due to scheduling problems. Tay Lopez was then cast, but declined for medical reasons, since the role required him to gain and lose weight quickly and he suffers from hypertension. Little known 30-year-old stage actor Rui Ricardo Dias was then cast as Lula. Other cast members includes Glória Pires as Lula's mother Dona Lindu, Cléo Pires as Lula's first wife Lourdes and Juliana Baroni as Marisa Letícia Lula da Silva. Lucélia Santos, a close friend of Lula, played a small role as his teacher. Milhem Cortaz, known for playing a corrupt police officer in the Golden Bear-winning film Tropa de Elite, was cast as Lula's father Aristides.

The film was produced by Luiz Carlos Barreto and Paula Barreto, father and sister of the director, respectively. The budget of the film was relatively high for Brazilian cinema standards: over 17 million reais (more than 9.5 million U.S. dollars). The Barretos, who supported Lula in both 2002 and 2006 presidential elections, claimed to have obtained financing without government funds in order to repel criticism from their work. According to Agência Estado, however, the film was sponsored by several construction firms, something extremely unusual for the Brazilian film market. Three of these companies maintain direct business with the federal government.

The shooting of the film began in late January 2009 in the Pernambuco municipality of Garanhuns, Lula's hometown. In February, the second phase of the production began in Santos and Guarujá, cities on the coast of São Paulo where Lula spent most of his childhood. The shooting was predicted to end on March 21, 2009. The film was then edited in time to premiere in some film festivals prior to its wide release in Brazilian cinemas on January 1, 2010.

== Cast ==
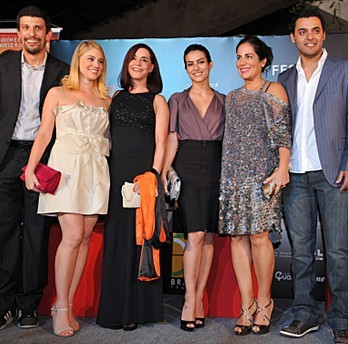
Cast of Lula, Son of Brasil, during the film's premiere at the Brasília Film Festival. From right to left: Rui Ricardo Dias, Glória Pires, Cléo Pires, Lucélia Santos, Juliana Baroni and Milhem Cortaz.

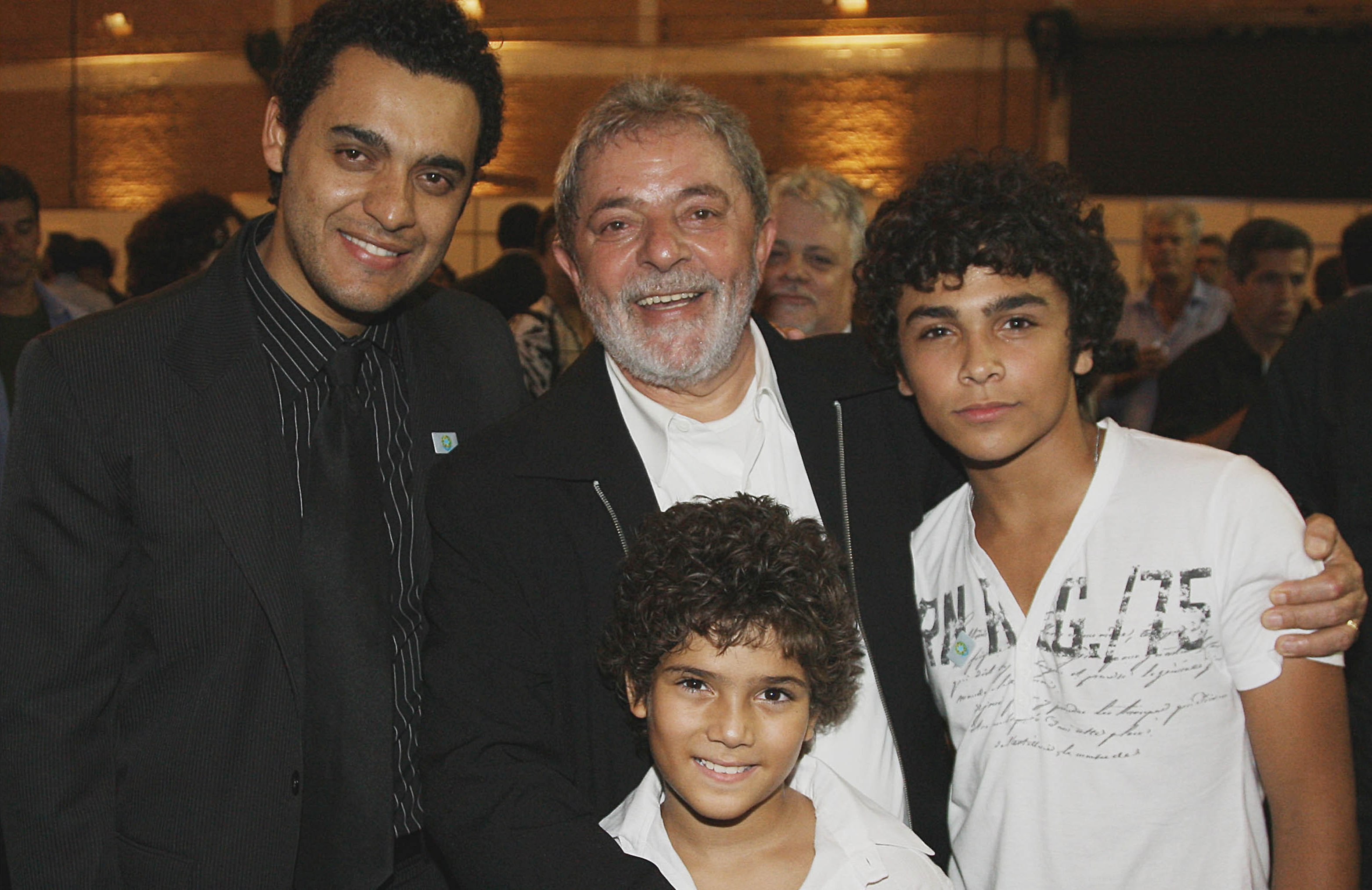
President Luiz Inácio Lula da Silva, with actors Rui Ricardo Dias, Felipe Falanga and Guilherme Tortólio during the film's premiere in the city of São Bernardo do Campo.

Main cast:

- Rui Ricardo Dias as Luiz Inácio Lula da Silva
- Glória Pires as Dona Lindu
- Juliana Baroni as Marisa Letícia
- Cléo Pires as Lourdes da Silva
- Milhem Cortaz as Aristides
- Sóstenes Vidal as Ziza

Supporting cast:

- Guilherme Tortólio as adolescent Lula
- Felipe Falanga as young Lula
- Rayana Cavalho as Dona Mocinha
- Lucélia Santos as Lula's teacher
- Antonio Pitanga as Mr. Cristóvão
- Celso Frateschi as Mr. Álvaro
- Marcos Cesana as Cláudio Feitosa
- Clayton Mariano as Lambari
- Mariah Teixeira as Marinete
- Suzana Costa as midwife
- Jones Melo as salesman
- José Ramos as Pau de Arara driver
- Antonio Saboia as Vavá
- Eduardo Acaiabe as Geraldão
- Marat Descartes as Arnaldo
- Nei Piacentini as Dr. Miguel
- Luccas Papp as Lambari (age 15)
- Vanessa Bizarro as Lourdes (age 13)
- Maicon Gouveia as Jaime
- Jonas Mello as Tosinho
- Fernando Alves Pinto as journalist
- Fernanda Laranjeira as Tiana

== Historical background ==
Some facts of Lula's early life coincides with several aspects of the Brazilian history, and this is a reason why Paraná decided to write her book, which was also her Ph.D. dissertation at the University of São Paulo History School. During her research for the book, Paraná interviewed Lula himself and several people connected to him. According to her, while listening to Lula's statements, she thought that it was "a poorly written movie script, because everything fits".

Among the facts of Lula's life and the history of Brazil that "fits" together, according to the author, are the death of his first wife by malpractice during labour at the same time that Brazil had one of the highest rates in the world of death in childbirth, the migration of his family to São Paulo at the same time which Brazil was struggling with its largest internal migration wave and Lula's father developing alcoholism at the same time there was an epidemic incidence of this disease in the Northeast region of Brazil.

== Soundtrack ==
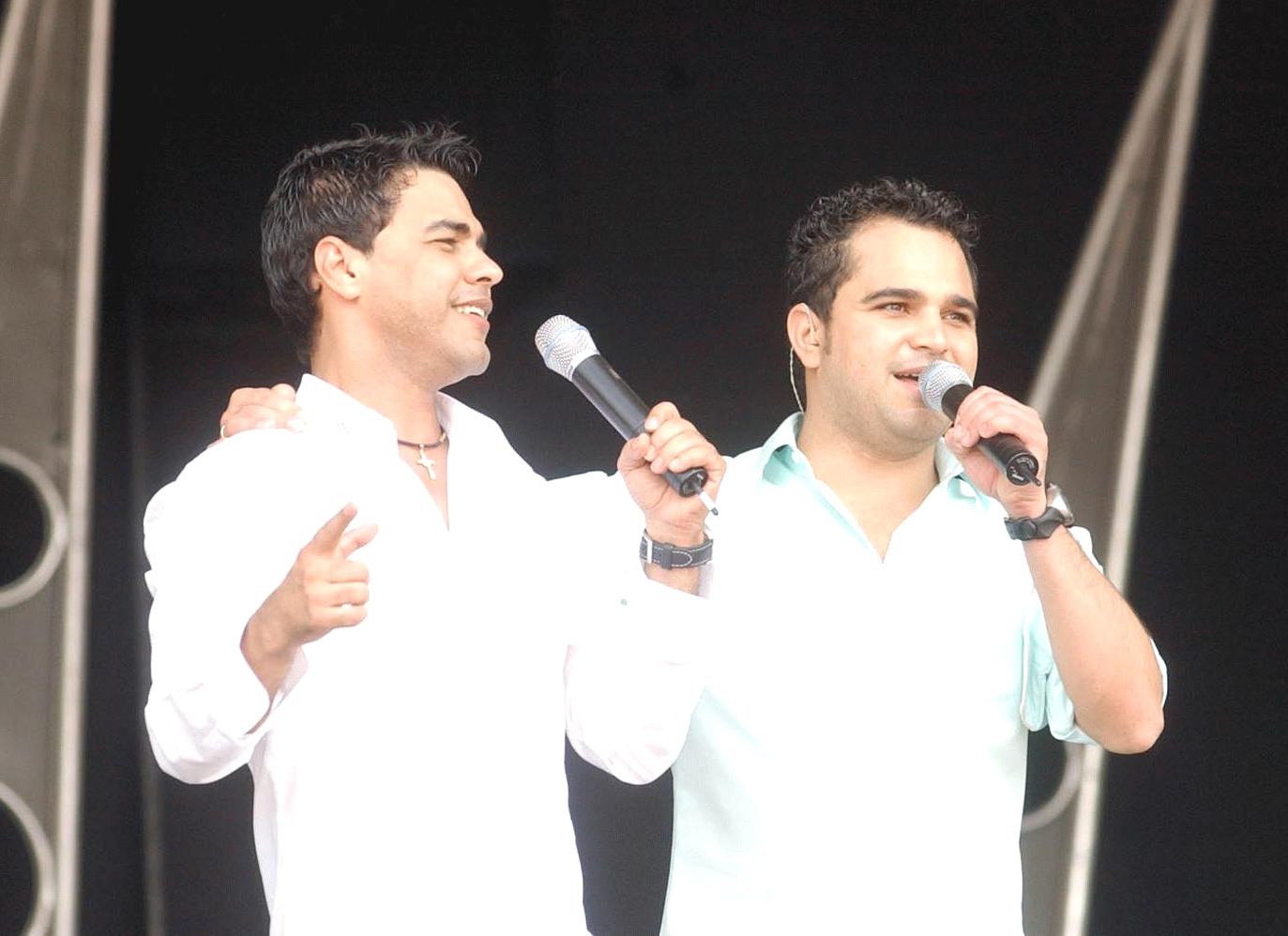
Zezé Di Camargo & Luciano recorded "Meu Primeiro Amor" at the request of Lula.

The soundtrack was composed by Antonio Pinto. The musical taste of Lula was faithfully followed in the preparation of the soundtrack. He requested the sertanejo duo Zezé Di Camargo & Luciano to record "Meu Primeiro Amor", a version of "Lejanía" by Paraguayan composer Herminio Giménez adapted into Portuguese by José Fortuna. The former president also requested the inclusion of two remarkable songs in his life and emotional memories: "Nossa Canção", a romantic samba by Luiz Ayrão, recorded by Nana Caymmi especially for the soundtrack, and "Desesperar Jamais" by Ivan Lins and Vitor Martins, recorded by Ivan and samba player Roberto Ribeiro. The soundtrack is complemented with songs contemporary to the years represented in the film, such as "Sentimental Demais" by Altemar Dutra, "Estúpido Cupido" by Celly Campelo, "Saudosa Maloca" by Demônios da Garoa, and even "Pra Frente Brasil", an anthem for the Brazil national football team during the 1970 FIFA World Cup. The film's soundtrack album was released a month before the film, marking the first time this had ever happened in Brazil.

== Release ==
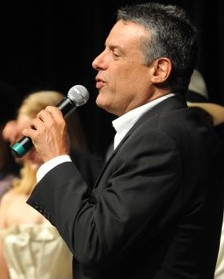
Director and screenwriter Fábio Barreto during the premiere of Lula, Son of Brasil at the 2009 Brasília Film Festival.

Although it had not been chosen by the competitive selection of the 42nd Brasilia Film Festival, the film premiered at the event's opening in the Brazilian federal capital on November 18, 2009. At least 300 employees of the presidential palace Palácio do Planalto attended. In Lula's home state of Pernambuco, the film premiered in Recife on November 19, being attended by several politicians and the president's relatives. On November 28, Lula himself attended the film's premiere in São Bernardo do Campo, the city where he began his political activities. The film also premiered in João Pessoa and Rio de Janeiro later in 2009. According to Regina Rito's gossip column on newspaper O Dia, the film's international premiere was held in Washington, D.C. at the request of American president Barack Obama. On January 1, 2010, the film received its wide release, debuting at over 500 cinemas all over Brazil.

Unionized workers were able to purchase the film's tickets for 5 reals (about 2,5 U.S. dollars) between November 20 and December 31, 2009, after a deal made between labour unions Central Única dos Trabalhadores and Força Sindical and the producers. Since its wide release on January 1, 2010, unionized workers were able to buy tickets with a 50% discount.

The film's DVD release took place in May 2009. It has affordable prices, from 10 to 12 reais (around 5 to 7 U.S. dollars), in order to counteract piracy. The DVD has more than 10 extra features, including an exclusive interview with Lula about the film. Upon the DVD release, Tadeu Damiani, president of the Union of Video Rentals of the State of São Paulo and member of opposition party PPS, had sent an open letter to 2,800 video rental stores in the state recommending that they should not buy or rent the film. He spread his plea throughout video rental associations and trade unions in the country. The reason he gave for starting the campaign was that Lula had watched 2 Filhos de Francisco before being released, encouraging piracy. But, there is no evidence that proves that President Lula had watched by illegal means.

On September 23, 2010, Lula, Son of Brazil premiered in Argentina. It was screened on 20 cinemas in Buenos Aires, La Plata and Mar del Plata. The release in Argentina had been delayed for four months in order to enjoy the atmosphere of the presidential election in Brazil. Initially, the producers had planned to release the film simultaneously in all South American countries, but logistical issues and the reduced time prevented the plan from taking place. In the United States, the premiere is scheduled for February or March 2011. The distribution will be done by New Yorker Films, which had dropped the film after the Brazil–Turkey–Iran agreement in fear of a boycott led by the Jewish community. The film's ending clip has been modified for foreign audiences. According to producer Luiz Carlos Barreto, the international distributors wanted to highlight Lula's consecration as a global leader. "Instead of pictures in the Northeast, with his family, they want pictures with Obama and the Queen of the United Kingdom. We had this available, but avoided putting it in the original version in order not to get very jingoistic", he said.

The film has two scheduled dates for television premiere. It will be featured on Canal Brasil's programming in February if the Academy of Motion Picture Arts and Sciences announces that the film will compete for the Academy Award for Best Foreign Language Film. Otherwise, it will be aired in March, in accordance with the rules of the academy.

== Reception ==
=== Public ===
Lula, Son of Brazil was a commercial flop, grossing only two million reals (around one million U.S. dollars) in its first week of release, being watched by no more than 200,000 people. In spite of the controversy surrounding the film, it was still the second in box office receipts that week, behind Avatar. As of January 8, the film had been watched by almost 320,000 people. At the end of its theatrical run, the film had sold 852,212 tickets, making it only the 7th highest-grossing national production of 2010 in Brazil.

After watching the film in London, British Indian actor Ben Kingsley said that "this film is important for the whole world", adding that "[Lula's] history is bigger than Gandhi's". Kingsley won the Academy Award for Best Actor in 1982 for his performance as Mahatma Gandhi in the eponymous film.

=== Critical response ===
Lula, Son of Brazil has an approval rating of 26% on review aggregator website Rotten Tomatoes, based on 19 reviews, and an average rating of 5.1/10. Metacritic assigned the film a weighted average score of 44 out of 100, based on 9 critics, indicating "mixed or average reviews".

Alexei Barrionuevo, correspondent for The New York Times in Brazil, criticized the film for "failing to mention that Lula abandoned his girlfriend, Miriam Cordeiro, when she was six months pregnant". Lurian Cordeiro, Lula's daughter with Miriam, sent a letter to the editor saying that her mother was not "abandoned". Cordeiro said that Lula not only paid for all of her mother's medical costs, but also legally recognized her as his daughter on the very day after her birth. She also noted the fact that none of Lula's children are mentioned in the film, questioning that "If the movie is about my father's path from impoverished immigrant to trade union leader, where do my brothers and I fit in?". She finished the letter by saying that she "loved the film" and that she agrees "with President Obama: Lula is the man!".

On March 15, 2010, Brazilian magazine Veja made a list of the top 10 worst Brazilian films of all time, and Lula, Son of Brazil was featured in ninth place. The list's author, Pollyane Lima e Silva, stated: "The director, Fábio Barreto, went on to say that his intention was not to be faithful to reality, but was, instead, 'to do a melodrama'. And he was successful, since many scenes shown in the film never happened, and others were exaggerated so that Lula could seem like a hero".

=== Political criticism ===
The film has been criticized by the Brazilian press for being released in an electoral year, while Lula was trying to elect his successor Dilma Rousseff. The release date would represent a deliberate attempt to influence the outcome of the election, in order to help Lula's candidate. Rousseff admitted in an interview that the film could influence the outcome of the election. But she added that "there is no possible way to measure the effect of this". The DVD release date, scheduled for May 2010, has also been criticized, as the electoral debate would be warming up. In November 2009, it was revealed that Rede Globo bought the exclusive television rights for the film, but decided to broadcast it only after the elections.

The biggest criticism, however, is that the film ignores less flattering aspects of Lula's career. According to O Globo's Ricardo Noblat, the film represents an attempt to eliminate all of Lula' failures, making him look like the almost perfect protagonist, showing him in an overly romanticized and heroic role. This would also have electoral purposes, according to him. The film was also criticized by opposition politicians, the press and by many Brazilians because many of the companies that invested in the film (such as the heavy construction firms Odebrecht and Camargo Correa, as well as electric utilities) depend on government concessions and have major contracts with the federal government.

The New York Times' Barrionuevo also said that the film may have an impact in the presidential election. He noted that while Lula can not run for re-election, "he hopes to transfer his popularity to his chief of staff and chosen successor, Dilma Rousseff". "Political analysts sees the movie as part of the renovation of the myth of Lula, which could help him return to power in 2014", he added.

Glória Pires, who played Lula's mother in the film, said that Lula, Son of Brazil was a victim of political prejudice. According to her, "people saw another movie (...); the film I was in was based on a beautiful story of overcoming adversities, which was about a man that would become president, and not only a movie about the president itself". Main actor Rui Ricardo Dias said that "those in power today do not depend on this film for absolutely anything. Nor is this production going to change anything in the course of the elections".

=== Academy Award submission ===
On September 23, 2010, Lula, Son of Brazil was unanimously chosen by government Ministry of Culture commission as Brazil's submission to the 83rd Academy Award for Best Foreign Language Film. The commission was formed by nine government officials, including members of the Ministry, the Brazilian Film Academy, the Audiovisual Secretariat, and the National Agency for Cinema. According to Roberto Farias, president of the Brazilian Film Academy and representative for the commission, "we voted in the film that seemed most well done, which honors the Brazilian film industry and has as an actress like Glória Pires, who becomes an excellent candidate for the Best Actress award".

Director Daniel Filho, whose film Chico Xavier was also in the competition to represent Brazil at the Oscars, criticized the Ministry's choice, labelling it as political, and saying that the film's title should have been Lula, the Owner of Brazil. Arnaldo Jabor, whose film A Suprema Felicidade was also in the competition for the submission, chose not to comment on the Ministry's choice, saying that the commission "must have had reasons" to choose the film.

According to producer Paula Barreto, the film may not be the best among the 23 competitors for the submission, but is the most adequate for the Academy Awards. She believes that the film was "analyzed by reputable people, who know the film industry and also how the Oscar dispute works". Farias responded the criticism for his commission's choice by saying that "our position has nothing to do with politics". The film didn't make the shortlist published in January 2011.
