= O Quatrilho =

1995 film directed by Fábio Barreto

- DVD release poster
- Directed by: Fábio Barreto
- Screenplay by: Leopoldo Serran
- Adaptation by: Antônio Calmon
- Based on: O Quatrilho by José Clemente Pozenato
- Produced by: Lucy Barreto; Luiz Carlos Barreto
- Starring: Glória Pires; Patrícia Pillar; Alexandre Paternost; Bruno Campos
- Cinematography: Félix Monti
- Edited by: Mair Tavares; Karen Harley
- Music by: Jaques Morelenbaum
- Production companies: Filmes do Equador; L. C. Barreto
- Distributed by: Consórcio Severiano Ribeiro & Marcondes
- Release date: 20 October 1995
- Running time: 92 minutes
- Country: Brazil
- Languages: Portuguese; Italian

O Quatrilho (Portuguese pronunciation: [u kwaˈtɾiʎu]) is a 1995 Brazilian drama film directed by Fábio Barreto. It is based on the 1985 novel of the same name by José Clemente Pozenato. It stars Glória Pires, Patrícia Pillar, Alexandre Paternost and Bruno Campos. The original soundtrack was composed by Jaques Morelenbaum and the theme song by Caetano Veloso.

It was the first Brazilian film nominated for the Academy Award for Best Foreign Language Film since 1962's Keeper of Promises.

== Plot ==
The film follows the story of two Italian immigrant couples living in the state of Rio Grande do Sul in the early 20th century; Teresa (Patrícia Pillar) and Angelo (Alexandre Paternost) and Pierina (Glória Pires) and Massimo (Bruno Campos). While the couples struggle for survival in their new country, an unexpected love between Massimo and Teresa emerges. They fight against family and cultural traditions and head to a new destiny, leaving their partners behind. Quatrilho is the name of a card game in which the player has to betray his partner to win. It is also a reference to the Portuguese language word quatro, which means four. The film was also advertised as O Qu4trilho.

== Cast ==
- Patrícia Pillar as Teresa
- Glória Pires as Pierina
- Bruno Campos as Massimo
- Alexandre Paternost as Angelo
- Cecil Thiré as Father Gentile
- José Lewgoy as Rocco
- Fábio Barreto as Gaudério
- José Clemente Pozenato as the photographer

== Awards and nominations ==
Beside its Academy Award nomination, the film won three awards at the Havana Film Festival: Best Actress for Glória Pires, Best Art Direction and Best Music. Pires also won the São Paulo Association of Art Critics trophy for Best Actress for her performance in the film.

== See also ==
- List of submissions to the 68th Academy Awards for Best Foreign Language Film
- List of Brazilian submissions for the Academy Award for Best Foreign Language Film
