= Maria Sílvia =

Brazilian actress

Maria Sílvia Correa Moreira Menezes Aguiar (February 16, 1944 – July 26, 2009) was a Brazilian film, stage and television actress.

Sílvia was already a well established film and theater actress by the time she made her television acting debut in the late 1970s. Her role in a telenovela came in 1977 on O Astro (Star) on Rede Globo. One of her most well known telenovela roles was on the Rede Globo show, Alma gêmea (Soulmate), in 2005 in which she played a traditional, elderly Brazilian indigenous woman. Silvia's other telenovela credits included Torre de Babel in 1998, Chocolate com pimenta in 2003, and Páginas da Vida in 2006.

Sílvia appeared in a number of films throughout her career, some of which were directed by Walter Lima Jr, Ruy Guerra, Arnaldo Jabor and Paulo César Saraceni.

Maria Sílvia died of lung cancer on July 26, 2009, in Rio de Janeiro at the age of 65. She was buried on July 27 at the Cemitério São João Batista in Botafogo, neighborhood in the southern zone of Rio de Janeiro.

== Filmography ==
=== Telenovelas ===
- 1977 - O Astro - Tânia
- 1988 - Olho por Olho - Maria
- 1989 - Kananga do Japão - Brígida
- 1990 - A História de Ana Raio e Zé Trovão - Fifi
- 1993 - Você Decide - Marilu
- 1994 - Memorial de Maria Moura - Jove
- 1998 - Torre de Babel - Dirce
- 2000 - Brava Gente - Ivone
- 2003 - Chocolate com Pimenta - Vizinha
- 2005 - Alma Gêmea - Índia Velha
- 2006 - Páginas da Vida - Marlene
- 2006 - Vidas Opostas - Mercedes
- 2007 - Caminhos do Coração - Magda
- 2008 - Chamas da Vida - Miriam
- 2009 - Os Mutantes - Caminhos do Coração - Magda

=== Films ===
- 1975 - Joanna Francesa
- 1976 - Gordos e Magros
- 1976 - Marília e Marina
- 1976 - A Queda
- 1976 - Assuntina das Amérikas
- 1976 - Perdida
- 1977 - Ajuricaba, o Rebelde da Amazônia
- 1977 - Esse Rio Muito Louco
- 1977 - Anchieta, José do Brasil
- 1977 - Mar de Rosas
- 1978 - O Bandido Antonio Do
- 1978 - Tudo Bem
- 1979 - Amor e Traição
- 1980 - Cabaret Mineiro
- 1981 - Eu Te Amo
- 1982 - Luz del Fuego
- 1983 - Janete
- 1983 - O Mágico e o Delegado
- 1984 - Patriamada
- 1984 - Noites do Sertão
- 1984 - Dois Homens Para Matar
- 1984 - Águia na Cabeça
- 1986 - Ópera do Malandro
- 1987 - Ele, o Boto
- 1988 - Romance
- 1989 - Minas-Texas
- 1995 - Sombras de Julho
- 1995 - Yemanján tyttäret
- 1996 - Como Nascem os Anjos
- 1998 - Amor & Cia
- 2001 - Uma Vida em Segredo
- 2004 - O Diabo a Quatro
- 2005 - Desejo
