= The Amulet of Ogum =

1974 film

- Film poster
- Directed by: Nelson Pereira dos Santos
- Written by: Nelson Pereira dos Santos; Francisco Santos
- Produced by: Nelson Pereira dos Santos
- Starring: Ney Santanna
- Cinematography: Nelson Pereira dos Santos
- Edited by: Severino Dadá
- Release date: 1974
- Running time: 112 minutes
- Country: Brazil
- Language: Portuguese

The Amulet of Ogum (Portuguese: O Amuleto de Ogum) is a 1974 Brazilian drama film directed and co-written by Nelson Pereira dos Santos. The film, which depicts the life of a young man protected by the rites of umbanda, was shown at international film festivals following its release. It was selected as the Brazilian entry for the Best Foreign Language Film at the 48th Academy Awards, but was not nominated.

== Synopsis ==
In the frame story, Firmino, a blind guitar player, is accosted by three hoodlums who demand that he tell them a story. Firmino begins to tell a true story about the amulet of Ogum.

Gabriel is a boy whose father and brother have been killed; his mother, Maria, takes him to a pai-de-santo. Gabriel receives the amulet of Ogum as a protective charm. Ten years later, Gabriel is sent to live with the gangster Severiano, bearing with him a letter from family friend Clóvis which claims that Gabriel has a "closed body" and is physically invulnerable. This is confirmed when Gabriel is accidentally shot by one of Severiano's henchmen and is unharmed. Gabriel subsequently joins Severiano in criminal activity but tensions grow as Gabriel becomes attracted to Eneida, Severiano's lover, and Gabriel soon forms his own gang. Severiano's men attempt to assassinate Gabriel but fail. Severiano is unable to get Eneida to betray Gabriel and tries to assassinate Gabriel's mother, Maria. That attempt fails when the assassins kill a cleaning lady instead but Severiano successfully lures Gabriel into a gunfight by promulgating news of Maria's supposed death. Gabriel is shot in the back, but miraculously emerges from the ocean alive again.

Meanwhile, the hoodlums are unhappy with Firmino's story and attempt to shoot him but discover that Firmino also has a "closed body," just like Gabriel. Firmino proceeds to kill the three hoodlums with a knife and walks away singing.

== Cast ==
- Ney Santanna as Gabriel
- Anecy Rocha as Eneida
- Joffre Soares as Severiano
- Maria Ribeiro as Maria
- Emmanuel Cavalcanti
- Jards Macalé as Firmino
- Erley José
- Francisco Santos
- José Marinho
- Antônio Carlos de Souza Pereira
- Ilya São Paulo

== Production ==
After Nelson Pereira dos Santos's return to Brazil in 1973 and the ascendancy of Ernesto Geisel as dictator in 1974, gradual political liberalization led Santos to pursue projects like The Amulet of Ogum. The film was co-produced with the Brazilian state enterprise Embrafilme, based on an earlier script titled O amuleto da morte by Francisco Santos which was heavily rewritten by dos Santos to blend religious elements with the criminal storyline. Several actors who appeared in dos Santos's earlier film Vidas secas, including Maria Ribeiro and Joffre Soares, returned to play roles in The Amulet of Ogum.

The character of Gabriel is deliberately personified as an aspect of Ogum, warrior god of metalworking. Local umbanda pai-de-santo José de Carvalho was consulted on the film's religious aspects, and filming was delayed for a week while appropriate permissions were acquired to film the ritual closing of Gabriel's body. Dos Santos acknowledged the influence of his first wife Laurita, an anthropologist, on the film's treatment of popular religion.

At the time of the film's production, the public practice of umbanda, candomblé, and macumba were legally regulated by the military dictatorship in Brazil. However, government censors only required one of the more graphic torture scenes to be cut before allowing the film's release in 1975.

== Release ==
The Amulet of Ogum was marketed as an art film and primarily shown in small theaters; a special showing in Duque de Caxias, Rio de Janeiro was well-received. This was in part due to the character Gabriel being partially based on the life of local mobster-politician Tenório Cavalcanti (pt:Tenório Cavalcanti).

The Amulet of Ogum was distributed in the United States in February 1987 with a 117-minute running time.

== Reception ==
The Amulet of Ogum was entered into the 1975 Cannes Film Festival. The film took home the prize for Best Picture at the Festival de Gramado. It was selected by Brazil as its entry for the 48th Academy Awards but was not nominated.

Vincent Canby, film critic at The New York Times, called it "the sort of folkloric though sophisticated film that was so beloved by members of Brazil's 'new cinema'" and called it "as much a musical as a religious journey." He described the acting as "performed in an appropriately florid style by just about everyone except young Ney Sant'Anna, who keeps a heroic cool about him, which is fitting for a figure of such import."

Dave Kehr, writing for the Chicago Reader, said that the film "sounds like a highly typical work," while Ted Shen, writing for the same publication, opined that "the long sequences of Afro-Brazilian cleansing rituals offer some relief from all the barely coherent, over-the-top action." Kevin Thomas, film critic at the Los Angeles Times, thought that the film was "not one of the father of Cinema Novo's best films" and that, while "tending to ramble even more than most Brazilian pictures," the film was a "volatile mixture of violence and voodoo."

== See also ==
- List of submissions to the 48th Academy Awards for Best Foreign Language Film
- List of Brazilian submissions for the Academy Award for Best Foreign Language Film
