= Sagarana: The Duel =

1973 Brazilian film

- Theatrical release poster
- Directed by: Paulo Thiago
- Written by: Paulo Thiago
- Based on: "O Duelo" by João Guimarães Rosa
- Produced by: Paulo Thiago
- Starring: Joel Barcellos; Milton Moraes; Ítala Nandi
- Cinematography: Mário Carneiro
- Edited by: Mário Carneiro
- Music by: Antônio Carlos Jobim; Dorival Caymmi
- Production companies: Paulo Thiago Produções; Encontro Produções
- Distributed by: Embrafilme
- Release date: 30 December 1973
- Running time: 110 minutes
- Country: Brazil
- Language: Portuguese

Sagarana: The Duel (Portuguese: Sagarana, o Duelo) is a 1973 Brazilian adventure drama film directed by Paulo Thiago, based on the short story "O Duelo" by João Guimarães Rosa. It was entered into the 24th Berlin International Film Festival.

== Cast ==
- Joel Barcellos as Turíbio
- Milton Moraes as Cassiano
- Ítala Nandi as Mariana
- Rodolfo Arena as Exaltino
- Ana Maria Magalhães
- Paulo César Peréio
- Zózimo Bulbul
- Sadi Cabral as Habrão
- Paulo Villaça as Elias Ruivo
- Wilson Grey
- Átila Iório as Titão Passos
- Luiz Linhares
- Vinícius Salvatori
- Joffre Soares as Cara de Bronze
