= The Guns (film) =

1964 film directed by Ruy Guerra

- Theatrical release poster
- Directed by: Ruy Guerra
- Written by: Ruy Guerra; Pierre Pelegri; Miguel Torres
- Produced by: Jarbas Barbosa; Gilberto Perrone
- Starring: Átila Iório; Nelson Xavier; Maria Gladys
- Cinematography: Ricardo Aronovich
- Edited by: Raimundo Higino
- Music by: Moacir Santos
- Production company: Copacabana Filmes
- Distributed by: Herbert Richers; Embrafilme
- Release date: 1964
- Running time: 103 minutes (Director's cut); 80 minutes (Theatrical cut)
- Countries: Brazil; Argentina
- Language: Portuguese

The Guns (Portuguese: Os Fuzis) is a 1964 Brazilian-Argentine drama film directed by Ruy Guerra.

== Synopsis ==
The film's plot alternates between two stories, both set in the drought-stricken sertão of Northeastern Brazil in 1963. In one storyline a holy man urges a group of peasant pilgrims to follow an ox deemed as sacred in hopes that their devotion to it will bring an end to the drought. The other storyline follows a group of soldiers who are sent to the region to thwart the attempts of impoverished civilians to plunder a storehouse for food owned by the wealthy mayor of the small town of Milagres, Bahia.

Guerra filmed The Guns in a triptych of styles. The pilgrims appear as an anonymous mass in their devotion to their project, while the hungry peasants are given a more documentarian treatment. By contrast, the soldiers are more individuated, with long swaths of time devoted to showing their boredom in their task at hand. One soldier, Mario, becomes smitten with a young woman named Luisa who is reluctant to return his affection because she does not trust the soldiers. Meanwhile, a hotheaded soldier named Pedro shoots and kills a local peasant while he was out walking with his goat, after which he and his fellow soldiers cover up the incident to avoid persecution. Tensions come to a head when the charismatic truck driver and former soldier named Gaucho becomes frustrated by the peasants' inability to change their situation. After he sees a father reacted apathetically to death of his child from hunger, Gaucho takes up arms and engages in a firefight with the occupying soldiers who eventually kill him. In the end, the peasants assuage their hunger by defying the holy man and slaughtering and eating the sacred ox.

== Production ==
Director Ruy Guerra originally conceived on the story in 1958 and planned to film it in Greece with a plot revolving around a band of soldiers trying to defend a village from a pack of hungry wolves because a government ordinance prohibits the villagers from carrying firearms for fear of popular revolt. In Guerra's original story, tensions between the villagers and the visiting soldiers escalate into conflict, and a soldier kills one of the locals. In the end, the villagers drive the soldiers out, leaving themselves vulnerable to attack from the wolves in the surrounding forest. This version of "The Guns" was never made because Greek officials denied Guerra permits to shoot it. Guerra enlisted the help of his friend Miguel Torres to reconfigure the story, and in 1964 Guerra produced The Guns, filming it in the northeastern state of Bahia and adapting its screenplay to incorporate elements of Brazilian culture. Both story lines were generated out of an incident that occurred in 1924 when a group of soldiers shot and killed a sacred ox. Though Guerra had a firmly defined structure for the film's plot, he used a good deal of improvisation on set depending on what and who was on hand.

== Reception ==
The Guns was entered into the 14th Berlin International Film Festival where it won the Silver Bear Extraordinary Jury Prize. The New York Times called it "exceptionally good".

== Legacy ==
Along with Nélson Pereira dos Santos' 1963 drama, Vidas Secas ("Barren Lives"), and Glauber Rocha's 1964 film Deus e o Diabo na Terra do Sol (known in English as "Black God, White Devil"), The Guns is part of Brazil's "Golden Trilogy" of Cinema Novo and regarded as one of the key films that brought worldwide attention to Brazilian cinema.

Dialogue from the film is sampled on the 2002 album 1º Comunique by Brazilian post-rock band Retórica.

== Cast ==
- Átila Iório as Gaúcho
- Nelson Xavier as Mário
- Maria Gladys as Luísa
- Ivan Cândido as soldier
- Leonides Bayer as sergeant
- Hugo Carvana as José
- Paulo César Pereio as Pedro
- Mauricio Loyola
- Joel Barcellos
- Ruy Polanah
- Antonio Pitanga (credited as Antonio Sampaio)
