= Tenda dos Milagres =

Tenda dos Milagres can refer to:

- Tenda dos Milagres (novel), a 1969 novel
- Tenda dos Milagres (film), a 1977 film based on the novel
