= The Lyre of Delight =

1978 film

- Film poster
- Directed by: Walter Lima Jr.
- Written by: Walter Lima Jr.
- Produced by: Walter Lima Jr.
- Starring: Anecy Rocha
- Cinematography: Dib Lutfi
- Release date: 1978
- Running time: 105 minutes
- Country: Brazil
- Language: Portuguese

The Lyre of Delight (Portuguese: A Lira do Delírio) is a 1978 Brazilian drama film directed by Walter Lima Jr. The film was selected as the Brazilian entry for the Best Foreign Language Film at the 51st Academy Awards, but was not accepted as a nominee.

== Cast ==
- Anecy Rocha as Ness Elliott
- Cláudio Marzo
- Paulo César Peréio
- Antonio Pedro

== See also ==
- List of submissions to the 51st Academy Awards for Best Foreign Language Film
- List of Brazilian submissions for the Academy Award for Best Foreign Language Film
