= 19th Berlin International Film Festival =

1969 film festival in West Berlin, Germany

- Location: West Berlin, Germany
- Founded: 1951
- Awards: Golden Bear: Early Works
- Festival date: 25 June – 6 July 1969
- Website: Website

Berlin International Film Festival chronology
- 20th 18th

The 19th annual Berlin International Film Festival was held from 25 June to 6 July 1969.

The Golden Bear was awarded to Early Works directed by Želimir Žilnik.

== Jury ==
The following jury members were announced for the festival:

- Johannes Schaaf, West-German actor and filmmaker- Jury President
- Agnesa Kalinova, Czech-Slovak journalist and film critic
- José P. Dominiani, Argentinian screenwriter and film critic
- François Chalais, Belgian journalist and film historian
- John Russell Taylor, British writer and film critic
- Giovanni Grazzini, Italian film critic
- Masaki Kobayashi, Japanese filmmaker
- Archer Winsten, American film critic
- Ulrich Gregor, West-German film historian

== Official Sections ==
=== Main Competition ===
The following films were in competition for the Golden Bear award:

English title	Original title	Director(s)	Production Country
Aido: Slave of Love	愛奴	Susumu Hani	Japan
A Quiet Place in the Country	Un tranquillo posto di campagna	Elio Petri	Italy
A Touch of Love		Waris Hussein	United Kingdom
Ballad of Carl-Henning	Balladen om Carl-Henning	Sven and Lene Grønlykke	Denmark
The Bed Sitting Room		Richard Lester	United Kingdom
Brazil Year 2000	Brasil Ano 2000	Walter Lima, Jr.	Brazil
Coup de Grâce	Tiro de gracia	Ricardo Becher	Argentina
Early Works	Rani radovi	Želimir Žilnik	Yugoslavia
Erotissimo		Gérard Pirès	France, Italy
Goopy Gyne Bagha Byne	গুপী গাইন বাঘা বাইন	Satyajit Ray	India
Gravitation	Gravitacija ili fantastična mladost činovnika Borisa Horvata	Branko Ivanda	Yugoslavia
Greetings		Brian De Palma	United States
I'm an Elephant, Madame	Ich bin ein Elefant, Madame	Peter Zadek	West Germany
His Day of Glory	La sua giornata di gloria	Edoardo Bruno	Italy
Honeycomb	La madriguera	Carlos Saura	Spain
Joy of Learning	Le gai savoir	Jean-Luc Godard	France
Love and Anger	Amore e rabbia	Carlo Lizzani, Pier Paolo Pasolini, Bernardo Bertolucci, Jean-Luc Godard and Marco Bellocchio	Italy, France
Love Is Colder Than Death	Liebe ist kälter als der Tod	Rainer Werner Fassbinder	West Germany
Made in Sweden		Johan Bergenstråhle	Sweden
Midnight Cowboy		John Schlesinger	United States
Presadjivanje Osecanja		Dejan Djurković	Yugoslavia
Three into Two Won't Go		Peter Hall	United Kingdom
To See Or Not To See		Břetislav Pojar	Canada
We Are All Demons	Klabautermannen	Henning Carlsen	Denmark, Sweden, Norway

== Official Awards ==
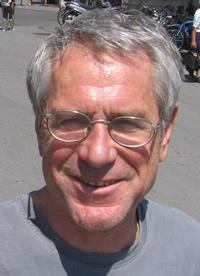
Želimir Žilnik, winner of the Golden Bear at the event

The following prizes were awarded by the Jury:

- Golden Bear: Early Works by Želimir Žilnik
- Silver Bear:
  - A Quiet Place in the Country by Elio Petri
  - Greetings by Brian De Palma
  - II'm an Elephant, Madame by Peter Zadek
  - Made in Sweden by Johan Bergenstråhle
  - Brazil Year 2000 by Walter Lima, Jr.

== Independent Awards ==
=== Youth Film Award ===
- Best Feature Film Suitable for Young People: Rani radovi by Želimir Žilnik

=== OCIC Award ===
- Midnight Cowboy by John Schlesinger

=== C.I.D.A.L.C. Gandhi Award ===
- The Bed Sitting Room by Richard Lester

=== UNICRIT Award ===
- Erotissimo by Gérard Pirès
