= Sônia Dias =

Brazilian actress

- Born: 19 February 1947 (age 78); Salvador, Bahia, Brazil
- Occupation(s): Actress, producer
- Years active: 1969–present
- Children: 1 (Manuela)

Sônia Dias (born 19 February 1947) is a Brazilian actress and producer, having been active since the 1960s.

Dias was born in 1947 in Salvador. She has been in films directed by well-known names in Brazilian cinema such as Júlio Bressane, Orlando Senna, Joaquim Pedro de Andrade, Hugo Carvana, Miguel Faria Jr., Neville d'Almeida and Nelson Pereira dos Santos. Her performance in Tenda dos Milagres went on to win the Trófeu Candango for Best Supporting Actress at the Festival de Brasília in 1977.

Dias is the mother of former actress, author, and screenwriter Manuela Dias. Sônia in part inspired her daughter to write Amor de Mãe.

== Filmography ==
=== Film ===
| Year | Title | Role | Note |
|---|---|---|---|
| 1969 | Meteorango Kid: Herói Intergalático | | |
| 1970 | Caveira, My Friend | | |
| 1973 | Vai Trabalhar, Vagabundo! | | |
| 1977 | Tenda dos Milagres | Ana Mercedes | |
| 1979 | Cidade pagã | | |
| 1980 | O Gigante da América | | |
| 1980 | Os 7 Gatinhos | Débora | |
| 1982 | Tabu | | |
| 1982 | O Homem do Pau-Brasil | | |
| 1983 | O Mágico e o Delegado | | |
| 1983 | O Cangaceiro Trapalhão | First lady of Águas Lindas | |
| 1984 | Para Viver um Grande Amor | | |
| 1985 | Brás Cubas | | Director of production |
| 1989 | Marina, a Desejada | | |
| 2012 | Matadouro | | Producer |
| 2020 | Longe do Paraíso | Madame | |

== Theatre ==
- As Desgraças de uma Criança (1968)
- Uma Obra do Governo (1968)
- Tem Piriri no Pororó (1971)
- Tô com Fogo na Mironga (1971)
- Pega no Ganzê, Bota pra Ganzá (1971–1972)

== Awards and nominations ==
| Year | Event | Category | Nomination | Result | Ref. |
|---|---|---|---|---|---|
| 1977 | Festival de Brasília | Best Supporting Actress | Tenda dos Milagres | Won | |
