= Rio, 100 Degrees F. =

1955 film directed by Nelson Pereira dos Santos

Rio, 100 Degrees F
- Rio, 40 Graus
- Directed by: Nelson Pereira dos Santos
- Written by: Arnaldo de Farias; Nelson Pereira dos Santos
- Produced by: Mário Barroso; Ciro Freire Cúri; Louis-Henri Guitton; Pedro Kosinski; Nelson Pereira dos Santos
- Starring: Roberto Batalin; Glauce Rocha; Jece Valadão
- Music by: Radamés Gnatalli; Alexandre Gnatalli; Cláudio Santoro
- Release date: 1955
- Running time: 100 minutes
- Country: Brazil
- Language: Portuguese

Rio, 100 Degrees F. (Portuguese: Rio, 40 Graus) is a 1955 Brazilian film written and directed by Nelson Pereira dos Santos. It is dos Santos' first feature work, inspired by the Italian Neo-Realism, and is considered a precursor of the Cinema Novo movement.

== Synopsis ==
One Sunday, five boys from the favela go to different parts of the city to sell peanuts. Zeca, Sujinho, Jorge, Paulinho and Xerife interconnect the focused stories, covering five touristic points: Copacabana, Sugar Loaf Mountain, Corcovado, Quinta da Boa Vista and Maracanã Stadium. In addition to trying to make a living, they decide to accumulate money to buy a soccer ball. Jorge also needs to sell enough to buy medicine for his sick mother. He goes to Copacabana, is bumped into and his can of peanuts falls into the sea. Without the goods to sell, Jorge starts begging and gets money, but other boys try to rob him, and when he gets rid of them, he is run over. Paulinho goes to Quinta da Boa Vista and his lizard, Catarina, escapes to the zoo. He retrieves it, but the guard of the place chases him away and throws his pet into a serpentarium. Resigned, Paulinho leaves for Maracanã, where he meets the rogue Miro [Jece Valadão(1930-2006)] and his partner Zé [Zé Kéti (1921-1999)] who, eager to enter the stadium and watch the game, take all of the boy's money and sell the remaining peanuts. Zeca, in turn, decides to go to Corcovado, but he is noticed by an exploiter of minors who works there, an unscrupulous old man who chases him, forcing him to make a risky escape. Sujinho, on the other hand, with no money and no peanuts, is escorted to his house by a policeman. Xerife does well in sales and manages to enter Maracanã, after circumventing security. He and Zeca end the day happy to have gotten the money.

Minor characters and other stories are told in parallel. One highlights the contrast in the careers of two players, Foguinho's revelation for football and Daniel's decadence. There is also the pregnancy of a migrant from the Northeast, whose boyfriend hesitates to make a commitment, and the arrival of a colonel from the interior to visit Corcovado.

== Cast ==
- Roberto Batalin .... Pedro
- Glauce Rocha .... Rosa
- Jece Valadão .... Miro
- Ana Beatriz .... Maria Helena
- Modesto de Souza .... landowner
- Cláudia Morena .... Alice
- Ivone Miranda
- Antônio Novais
- Jackson de Souza
- Sady Cabral
- Mauro Mendonça .... Italian tourist at the Sugarloaf Mountain
