= Tent of Miracles (novel) =

Novel by the Brazilian writer Jorge Amado

- First edition
- Author: Jorge Amado
- Original title: Tenda dos Milagres
- Language: Portuguese
- Publisher: Martins, Sao Paulo, Brazil
- Publication date: 1969
- Publication place: Brazil
- English publication date: 1971

Tent of Miracles (Portuguese: Tenda dos Milagres) is a Brazilian Modernist novel. It was written by Jorge Amado in 1967 and published the following year. It was later adapted to a 1977 Cinema Novo (Nouvelle Vague) film by director/screenplay writer Nelson Pereira dos Santos.

Tent of Miracles was written three years after the military overthrew Brazilian democracy, and it is part of a series Amado called "The Bahia Novels", works exploring the region's past. The novel chronicles the chaos that results when a prominent Columbia University professor arrives in Brazil, with nothing but praise on his lips for a long-forgotten local Bahian writer and self-taught social scientist named Pedro Archanjo. The year is 1968, which Levinson announces is the centennial of Archanjo's birth, setting off a media stampede to figure out who Archanjo was so that they can profit from a celebration of his life. When a few people finally uncover who Arcanjo was and what he espoused, media barons and advertisers are horrified to discover that he was an Afro-Brazilian social critic, womanizer and heavy drinker who died penniless in the gutter. So, they invent their own Pedro Archanjo, which they hype in various advertising-driven events, enlisting some Brazilian academics who are as superficial and self-promoting as Levinson.

The novel moves back and forth between events in the life of the historical hero, Pedro Archanjo, and the present. Most of the characters are types that lend themselves to the author's relentless satire. The historical setting is the colorful old Pelourinho neighborhood of Salvador, Bahia, that flows down the hill from the main plaza, where Archanjo works as a lowly runner at the School of Medicine adjacent to the cathedral. The place of the title is the home of the hero and his best friend, Lidio Corro, which also serves as barber shop, cultural center, print shop and artist's studio. The historical sections explore Afro-Brazilian culture and racial discrimination. Author Jorge Amado once declared that "Brazil is a racial democracy", and the novel is consistent with that belief, because he situates all racism in the past.

The hero's male children are all over the city, but he is father to none. They call him "godfather," and he takes one of his "godchildren," Tadeu, under his wing to help him pursue an engineering degree. The womanizing of the hero serves to highlight the belief of both Pedro Archanjo and the novel's author that uninhibited sexual passion between people of different races and colors (and the resulting mixed children) is Brazil's unique solution to racism. The theory behind this view was disseminated by Brazilian sociologist and historian Gilberto Freyre in his treatise Casa-Grande & Senzala (1933), translated into English as The Masters and the Slaves. A number of the female characters in the novel are highly sexualized in ways that, according to critics, represent racial stereotypes.

In the face of criticism of his portrayals of women and Afro-Brazilian culture, Jorge Amado declared: "It is not a question of literary pride. It is only the certainty that no one until today had dared to look face-to-face with so much love at Bahian humanity and its problems. No one knows better than I, who wrote them, what the weaknesses and defects of my novels are. But, by the same token, no one can measure the sacrifice they cost me, the honesty that went into their making, the disinterest and pure love that made the novelist return to his people."

Beyond Amado's treatment of women and Afro-Brazilian culture, Tent of Miracles is a satire of modern Brazilian institutions, especially the mass media and parts of academia. Spared from the author's knife is the Brazilian military, which in 1967 was detaining, torturing and exiling some of Amado's political friends. A few scholars have suggested that the novel hides in its story a parable critical of the military dictatorship, particularly through the portrayal of a repressive but ineffectual assistant police commissioner, Pedrito Gordo.
