= A Árvore dos Sexos =

1977 film by Silvio de Abreu

- Directed by: Silvio de Abreu
- Starring: Nádia Lippi; Ney Santanna; Felipe Carone
- Release date: 1977
- Running time: 90 minutes
- Country: Brazil
- Language: Portuguese

A Árvore dos Sexos is a 1977 Brazilian pornochanchada film directed by Silvio de Abreu.

== Cast ==
- Nádia Lippi
- Ney Santanna
- Felipe Carone
- Yolanda Cardoso
- Maria Lúcia Dahl
- Sonia Mamede
- Antônio Petrin
- Virginia Lane
