= Ney Sant'Anna =

Brazilian actor

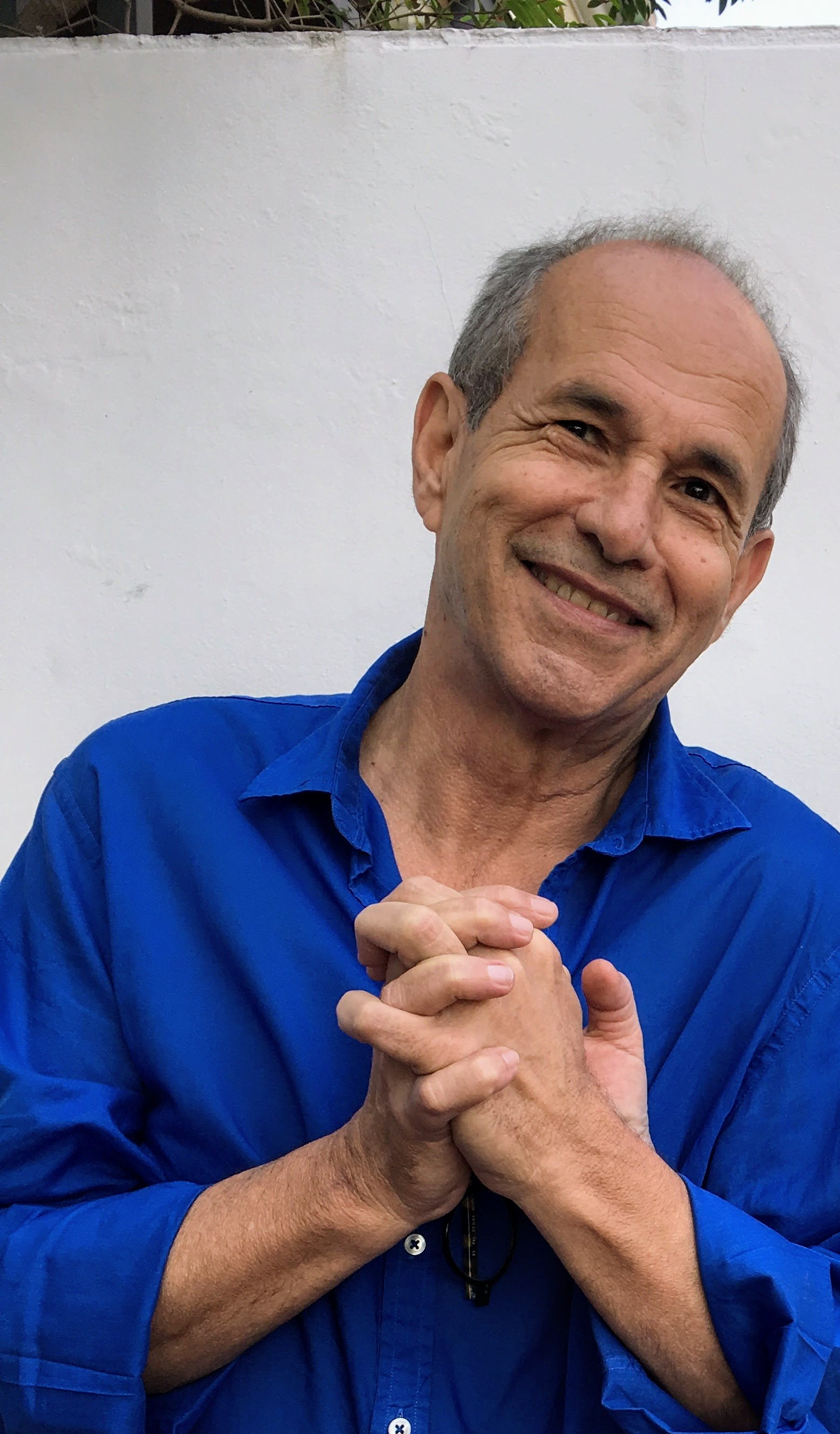
- Ney Sant'Anna in 2017
- Born: Ney Sant'Anna Pereira dos Santos; 16 January 1954 (age 72); São Paulo, Brazil
- Years active: 1970–present

Ney Sant'Anna Pereira dos Santos (born January 16, 1954) is a Brazilian film and television actor. He was born in São Paulo and is the son of Nelson Pereira dos Santos.

== Partial filmography ==
- The Alienist (1970)
- The Amulet of Ogum (1974)
- Joanna Francesa (1975)
- A Árvore dos Sexos (1977)
- Lady on the Bus (1978)
- The Third Bank of the River (1994; producer)
