= Cinema Novo =

Brazilian film movement

- Years active: 1950s to early 1970s
- Location: Brazil
- Major figures: Glauber Rocha, Nelson Pereira dos Santos, Paulo César Saraceni, Joaquim Pedro de Andrade, Leon Hirszman, Carlos Diegues, Ruy Guerra, Arnaldo Jabor
- Influences: Italian Neorealism, French New Wave, Soviet cinema

Cinema Novo (Portuguese pronunciation: [siˈnemɐ ˈnovu]; 'New Cinema'), is a genre and movement of film noted for its emphasis on social equality and intellectualism that rose to prominence in Brazil during the 1960s and 1970s. Cinema Novo formed in response to class and racial unrest both in Brazil and the United States. Influenced by Italian neorealism and French New Wave, films produced under the ideology of Cinema Novo opposed traditional Brazilian cinema, which consisted primarily of musicals, comedies and Hollywood-style epics. Glauber Rocha is widely regarded as Cinema Novo's most influential filmmaker. Today, the movement is often divided into three sequential phases that differ in tone, style and content.

== Origins ==
=== Background ===
In the 1950s, Brazilian cinema was dominated by chanchada (musicals, often comedic and "cheap"), big-budget epics that imitated the style of Hollywood, and "'serious' cinema" that Cinema Novo filmmaker Carlos Diegues characterizes as "sometimes cerebral and often ridiculously pretentious." This traditional cinema was supported by foreign producers, distributors and exhibitors. As the decade ended, young Brazilian filmmakers protested films they perceived as made in "bad taste and ... sordid commercialism, ... a form of cultural prostitution" that relied on the patronage of "an illiterate and impoverished Brazil."

Cinema Novo became increasingly political. In the 1960s, Brazil was producing the most political cinema in South America. Brazil therefore became the natural “home of the Cinema Novo (New Cinema) movement”. Cinema Novo rose to prominence at the same time that progressive Brazilian Presidents Juscelino Kubitschek and later João Goulart took office and began to influence Brazilian popular culture. But it was not until 1959 or 1960 that 'Cinema Novo' emerged as a label for the movement. According to Randal Johnson and Robert Stam, Cinema Novo officially began in 1960, with the start of its first phase.

In 1961, the Popular Center of Culture, a subsidiary of the National Students' Union, released Cinco Vezes Favela, a film serialized in five episodes that Johnson and Stam claim to be "one of the first" products of the Cinema Novo movement. The Popular Center of Culture (PCC) sought "to establish a cultural and political link with the Brazilian masses by putting on plays in factories and working-class neighborhoods, producing films and records, and by participating in literacy programs." Johnson and Stam hold that "many of the original members of Cinema Novo" were also active members in the PCC who participated in the production of Cinco Vezes Favela.

=== Influences ===
Brazilian filmmakers modeled Cinema Novo after genres known for subversiveness: Italian neorealism and French New Wave. Johnson and Stam further claim that Cinema Novo has something in common "with Soviet film of the twenties," which like Italian neorealism and French New Wave had "a penchant for theorizing its own cinematic practice." Italian neorealist cinema often shot on location with nonprofessional actors and depicted working class citizens during the hard economic times following World War II. French New Wave drew heavily from Italian neorealism, as New Wave directors rejected classical cinema and embraced iconoclasm.

Some proponents of Cinema Novo were "scornful of the politics of the [French] New Wave", viewing its tendency to stylistically copy Hollywood as elitist. But Cinema Novo filmmakers were largely attracted to French New Wave's use of auteur theory, which enabled directors to make low-budget films and develop personal fan bases.

== Ideology ==
Cinema Novo filmmaker Alex Viany describes the movement as having elements of participatory culture. According to Viany, while Cinema Novo was initially "as fluid and undefined" as its predecessor French New Wave, it required that filmmakers have a passion for cinema, a desire to use it to explain "social and human problems," and a willingness to individualize their work.

Auteur theory also greatly influenced Cinema Novo. Although its three phases were distinct, Cinema Novo encouraged directors to emphasize their personal politics and stylistic preferences. As Cinema Novo filmmaker Joaquim Pedro de Andrade explained to Viany in a 1966 interview:

In our films, the propositions, positions, and ideas are extremely varied, at times even contradictory or at least multiple. Above all they are increasingly free and unmasked. There exists a total freedom of expression. ... At first glance this would seem to indicate some internal incoherence within the Cinema Novo movement. But in reality I think it indicates a greater coherence: a more legitimate, truthful, and direct correspondence between the filmmaker--with his perplexities, doubts, and certainties--and the world in which he lives.

Class struggle also informed Cinema Novo, whose strongest theme is the "aesthetic of hunger" developed by premiere Cinema Novo filmmaker Glauber Rocha in the first phase. Rocha wished to expose how different the standard of living was for rich South Americans and poor South Americans. In his 1965 essay "The Esthetic of Hunger," Rocha stated that "the hunger of South America is not simply an alarming symptom: it is the essence of our society. ... [Cinema Novo's] originality is [South Americans'] hunger[,] and our greatest misery is that this hunger is felt but not intellectually understood." On this note, Wheeler Winston Dixon and Gwendolyn Audrey Foster hold that "[t]he Marxist implications of [Rocha's] cinema are hard to miss".

== Themes and style ==
Most film historians divide Cinema Novo into three sequential phases that differ in theme, style and subject matter. Stam and Johnson identify "a first phase going from 1960 to 1964," a second phase running "from 1964 to 1968," and a third phase running "from 1963 to 1972" (though they also claim the final phase concludes at "roughly" "the end of 1971"). There is little disagreement among film critics about this time frame.

Filmmaker Carlos Diegues claims that while lack of funds lowered the technical precision of Cinema Novo films, it also allowed directors, writers and producers to have an unusual amount of creative freedom. "Because Cinema Novo is not a school, it has no established style," states Diegues. "In Cinema Novo, expressive forms are necessarily personal and original without formal dogmas". This directorial freedom, along with the changing social and political climate in Brazil, caused Cinema Novo to experience shifts in form and content in a short amount of time.

=== First phase (1960–1964) ===
Films of the first phase represent the original motivation and goals of Cinema Novo. First-phase films were earnest in tone and rural in setting, dealing with social ills that affected the working class like starvation, violence, religious alienation and economic exploitation. They also addressed the "fatalism and stoicism" of the working class, which discouraged it from working to fix these problems. "The films share a certain political optimism," write Johnson and Stam, "a kind of faith that merely showing these problems would be a first step toward their solution."

Unlike traditional Brazilian cinema that depicted beautiful professional actors in tropical paradises, first-phase Cinema Novo "searched out the dark corners of Brazilian life--its favelas and its sertão--the places where Brazil's social contradictions appeared most dramatically." These topics were supported by aesthetics that "were visually characterized by a documentary quality, often achieved by the use of a hand-held camera" and were shot "in black and white, using simple, stark scenery that vividly emphasized the harshness of the landscape". Diegues contends that first-phase Cinema Novo did not focus on editing and shot-framing but rather on spreading a proletariat philosophy. "Brazilian filmmakers (principally in Rio, Bahia, and São Paulo) have taken their cameras and gone out into the streets, the country, and the beaches in search of the Brazilian people, the peasant, the worker, the fisherman, the slum dweller."

Most film historians agree that Glauber Rocha, "one of the most well-known and prolific filmmakers to emerge in the late 1950s in Brazil", was the most powerful advocate for Cinema Novo in its first phase. Dixon and Foster contend that Rocha helped initiate the movement because he wanted to make films that educated the public about social equality, art and intellectualism, which Brazilian cinema at the time did not do. Rocha summarized these goals by claiming his films used "aesthetics of hunger" to address class and racial unrest. In 1964, Rocha released Deus e o Diabo na Terra do Sol ("Black God, White Devil"), which he wrote and directed to “suggest that only violence will help those who are sorely oppressed".

With Rocha at the helm during its first phase, Cinema Novo was praised by critics around the world.

=== Second phase (1964–1968) ===
In 1964, popular Democratic President João Goulart was removed from office by military coup, turning Brazil into a military-run autocracy under new President Humberto de Alencar Castelo Branco. Brazilians consequently lost faith in the ideals of Cinema Novo, as the movement had promised to protect civilian rights yet had failed to uphold democracy. Cinema Novo filmmaker Joaquim Pedro de Andrade blamed fellow directors, who he claimed had lost touch with Brazilians while appealing to critics: "For a film to be a truly political instrument," de Andrade said, "it must first communicate with its public". Second-phase Cinema Novo thus sought to both deflect criticism and to address the "anguish" and "perplexity" that Brazilians felt after Goulart was ousted. It did this by producing films that were "analyses of failure--of populism, of developmentalism, and of leftist intellectuals" to protect Brazilian democracy.

At this time, filmmakers also started trying to make Cinema Novo more profitable. Stephanie Dennison and Lisa Shaw state that second-phase directors "recognized the irony in making so-called 'popular' films, to be viewed only by university students and art-house aficionados. As a result, some auteurs began to move away from the so-called 'aesthetics of hunger' toward a filmmaking style and themes designed to attract the interest of the cinema-going public at large." As a result, the first Cinema Novo film to be shot in color and to depict middle-class protagonists was released during this time: Leon Hirzshman's Garota de Ipanema ("Girl from Ipanema," 1968).

=== Third phase and Cinema Marginal (1968–1972) ===
Hans Proppe and Susan Tarr characterize Cinema Novo's third phase as "a mixed bag of social and political themes against a backdrop of characters, images and contexts not unlike the richness and floridness of the Brazilian jungle". Third-phase Cinema Novo has also been called "the cannibal-tropicalist phase" or simply the "tropicalist" phase.

Tropicalism was a movement that focused on kitsch, bad taste and gaudy colors. Film historians refer to cannibalism both literally and metaphorically. Both types of cannibalism are visible in Como Era Gostoso o Meu Francês ("How Tasty Was My Little Frenchman," 1971), in which the protagonist is abducted and eaten by literal cannibals at the same time it is "suggested that the Indians (i.e., Brazil) should metaphorically cannibalize their foreign enemies, appropriating their force without being dominated by them." Rocha believed cannibalism represented the violence that was necessary to enact social change and depict it onscreen: "From Cinema Novo it should be learned that an aesthetic of violence, before being primitive, is revolutionary. It is the initial moment when the colonizer becomes aware of the colonized. Only when confronted with violence does the colonizer understand, through horror, the strength of the culture he exploits."

With Brazil modernizing in the global economy, third-phase Cinema Novo also became more polished and professional, producing "films in which the rich cultural texture of Brazil has been pushed to the limit and exploited for its own aesthetic ends rather than for its appropriateness as political metaphor." Brazilian consumers and filmmakers began to feel that Cinema Novo was contradicting the ideals of its first phase. This perception led to the birth of Cinema Marginal, also called Udigrudi (Note: Brazilian pronunciation of "Underground.") cinema or Novo Cinema Novo, which used 'dirty screen' and 'garbage' aesthetics to return Cinema Novo to its original focus on marginalized characters and social problems, all while appropriating elements of b-movies and pornochanchadas to reach a wider, working-class audience.

But third-phase Cinema Novo also had supporters. Cinema Novo filmmaker Joaquim Pedro de Andrade, who was active during the first phase and produced one of the premiere films of the third phase, Macunaíma, was pleased Cinema Novo had made itself more relatable to Brazilian citizens, despite accusations it was selling out to do so. Referencing Leon Hirszman's Garota de Ipanema, de Andrade praised Hirszman for using "a popular stereotype to establish contact with the masses, while at the same time ... demystif[ying] that very stereotype".

== End of Cinema Novo ==
Burnes St. Patrick Hollyman, son of famed American photographer Thomas Hollyman, states that "by 1970, many of the cinema novo films had won numerous awards at international festivals". In 1970 Rocha published a manifesto on the progress of Cinema Novo, in which he said he was pleased that Cinema Novo "had gained critical acceptance as part of world cinema" and had become "a nationalist cinema that accurately reflected the artistic and ideological concerns of the Brazilian people" (Hollyman). But Rocha also warned filmmakers and consumers that being too complacent in the achievements of Cinema Novo would return Brazil to its pre-Cinema Novo state:

The movement is bigger than any one of us. But the young should know that they cannot be irresponsible about the present and the future because today's anarchy can be tomorrow's slavery. Before long, imperialism will start to exploit the newly created films. If the Brazilian cinema is the palm tree of Tropicalism, it is important that the people who have lived through the drought are on guard to make sure that Brazilian cinema doesn't become underdeveloped.

Rocha's fears were realized. In 1977, filmmaker Carlos Diegues said that "one can only talk about Cinema Novo in nostalgic or figurative terms because Cinema Novo as a group no longer exists, above all because it has been diluted into Brazilian cinema." Toward the end of Cinema Novo, the Brazilian government created film company Embrafilme to encourage production of Brazilian cinema; but Embrafilme mostly produced films that ignored the Cinema Novo ideology. Aristides Gazetas claims that Third Cinema now carries on the Cinema Novo tradition.

== Legacy ==
=== Embrafilme ===
In 1969, the Brazilian government instituted Embrafilme, a company designed to produce and distribute Brazilian cinema. Embrafilme produced movies of various genres, including fantasies and big-budget epics. At the time, Cinema Novo filmmaker Carlos Diegues said he supported Embrafilme because it was "the only enterprise with sufficient economic and political power to confront the devastating voracity of the multinational corporations in Brazil." Moreover, Diegues held that while Cinema Novo "is not identified with Embrafilme", "[Embrafilme's] existence ... is in reality a project of Cinema Novo."

When Embrafilme was dismantled in 1990 by President Fernando Collor de Mello, "the consequences" for the Brazilian film industry "were immediate and grim." Lacking investors, many Brazilian directors co-produced English films. This caused English cinema to overrun the Brazilian market, which went from producing 74 films in 1989 to producing nine films in 1993. Brazilian President Itamar Franco ended the crisis by implementing the Brazilian Cinema Rescue Award, which funded 90 projects between 1993 and 1994. The award "opened new doors to a young generation of new film-makers (and a few of the veterans) who were confident that, as the title of a film by Cinema Novo veteran director Carlos Diegues prophetically announced, better days would come (Melhores Dias Virao/Better Days Will Come, 1989)."

=== Third Cinema ===
According to Aristides Gazetas, Cinema Novo is the first example of an influential genre called Third Cinema. Like Cinema Novo, Third Cinema draws on Italian neorealism and French New Wave. Gazetas claims that Cinema Novo can be characterized as early Third Cinema because Glauber Rocha "adopted Third Cinema techniques to bring awareness of the social and political realities in his country through cinema". After fading with Cinema Novo, Third Cinema was revived in 1986 when English film companies looked to create a genre that "focused upon Anglo-American cinematic practices" and stayed away from "both the sentimental leftist cultural theory emanating from the UK and the cultural and educational practices in line with corporate cultures and market consumerism that related to variants of postmodernism."

In 1965, Glauber Rocha claimed that "Cinema Novo is a phenomenon of new peoples everywhere and not a privilege of Brazil." Appropriately, Third Cinema has affected film culture throughout the world. In Italy, Gillo Pontecorvo directed the Oscar-nominated The Battle of Algiers (1965), which depicted native African Muslims as brave militants fighting French colonists in Algeria. Cuban filmmaker Tomas Gutierrez Alea, co-founder of the ground-breaking Instituto Cubano del Arte e Industria Cinematográficos, used Third Cinema to "reconstitut[e] a historical past for Cubans." According to Stuart Hall, Third Cinema also impacted black peoples in the Caribbean by giving them two identities: one in which they are unified across a diaspora, and another that highlights "what black people have become as a result of white rule and colonization."

== List of key films ==
=== First phase ===
- Aruanda (1960)
- Arraial do Cabo (1960)
- Cinco Vezes Favela (1962)
- Barravento (1962)
- The Unscrupulous Ones (1962)
- Ganga Zumba (1963)
- Barren Lives (1963)
- Black God, White Devil (1964)
- The Guns (1964)

=== Second phase ===
- The Deceased (1965)
- The Challenge (1966)
- Entranced Earth (1967)
- The Brave Warrior (1968)
- Hunger for Love (1968)
- The Red Light Bandit (1968)

=== Third phase ===
- Macunaíma (1969)
- Antonio das Mortes (1969)
- Of Gods and the Undead (1970)
- The Heirs (1970)
- How Tasty Was My Little Frenchman (1971)
- Pindorama (1971)
- São Bernardo (1972)
- Iracema: Uma Transa Amazônica (1974)

== List of key directors ==
- Mário Carneiro
- Joaquim Pedro de Andrade
- Carlos Diegues
- Nelson Pereira dos Santos
- Ruy Guerra
- Leon Hirszman
- Gustavo Dahl
- Arnaldo Jabor
- David Neves
- Glauber Rocha
- Paulo César Saraceni
- Alex Viany
- Olney São Paulo
- Roberto Pires

== See also ==
- Nuevo Cine Mexicano
- List of Brazilian films
- Walter Salles-Acclaimed director of the 1998 Oscar-nominated Brazilian film Central do Brasil and 2004 Oscar-winning The Motorcycle Diaries

== Bibliography ==
- Dennison, Stephanie and Lisa Shaw (2004), Popular cinema in Brazil, 1930-2001, New York: Manchester.
- Dixon, Wheeler Winston and Gwendolyn Audrey Foster (2008), A Short History of Cinema, New Brunswick, NJ: Rutgers.
- Gazetas, Aristides (2008), An Introduction to World Cinema, Jefferson, NC: McFarland & Company.
- Hollyman, Burnes Saint Patrick (1983), Glauber Rocha and The Cinema Novo, New York & London: Garland.
- Johnson, Randal and Robert Stam (1995), Brazilian Cinema, New York: Columbia.
- King, John (2000), Magical Reels: A History of Cinema in South America, New York & London: Verso.
- Proppe, Hans and Susan Tarr (1976), "Pitfalls of cultural nationalism in cinema novo", Jump Cut: A Review of Contemporary Media, 10, 45-48.
- Rêgo, Cacilda (2011), "The Fall and Rise of Brazilian Cinema", in Rêgo, Calcida; Carolina, Rocha, New Trends in Argentine and Brazilian Cinema, Chicago: intellect.
- Rodríguez-Hernández, Rafael (2009), Splendors of South Cinema, Westport, CT: Praeger.
- Stam, Robert and Randal Johnson (November 1979), "Beyond Cinema Novo", Jump Cut: A Review of Contemporary Media, 21, 13-18.
- Viany, Alex (Winter, 1970), "The Old and the New in Brazilian Cinema", The Drama Review, 14 (2), 141-144.
- Xavier, Ismail (2000), "Cinema Novo", in Balderston, Daniel; Gonzalez, Mike; Lopez, Ana M., Encyclopedia of Contemporary South American and Caribbean Cultures, London: Routledge.
