= Brazil Year 2000 =

1969 film

- Theatrical release poster
- Directed by: Walter Lima Jr.
- Written by: Walter Lima Jr.
- Produced by: Luiz Carlos Barreto; Walter Lima Jr.
- Starring: Anecy Rocha; Ênio Gonçalves
- Cinematography: Guido Cosulich
- Edited by: Nello Melli
- Music by: Rogério Duprat; Gilberto Gil
- Production companies: Mapa Filmes; 2000 Film
- Distributed by: Difilm
- Release date: June 1969
- Running time: 95 minutes
- Country: Brazil
- Language: Portuguese

Brazil Year 2000 (Portuguese: Brasil Ano 2000) is a 1969 Brazilian drama film directed by Walter Lima Jr.

== Cast ==
- Anecy Rocha as Girl
- Ênio Gonçalves as Reporter
- Hélio Fernando as Son
- Iracema de Alencar as Mother
- Zbigniew Ziembinski as General (as Ziembinsky)
- Manfredo Colassanti as Man of the S.E.I.
- Arduíno Colassanti as Driver
- Rodolfo Arena as Priest
- Jackson De Souza as Politician
- Aizita Nascimento as Woman
- Raul Cortez as Man who protests

== Production ==
Filming took place in 1968. The staff stayed three months in Paraty before moving to Rio de Janeiro for additional shooting in places such as the National Museum of Brazil and the Brazilian National Archives.

== Reception ==
The film was entered into the 19th Berlin International Film Festival where it won a Silver Bear. It also won the Best Film Award at the 1970 Cartagena Film Festival and Best Director at the Manaus Film Festival.
