= Joel Barcellos =

Brazilian actor

Joel Dias Barcellos
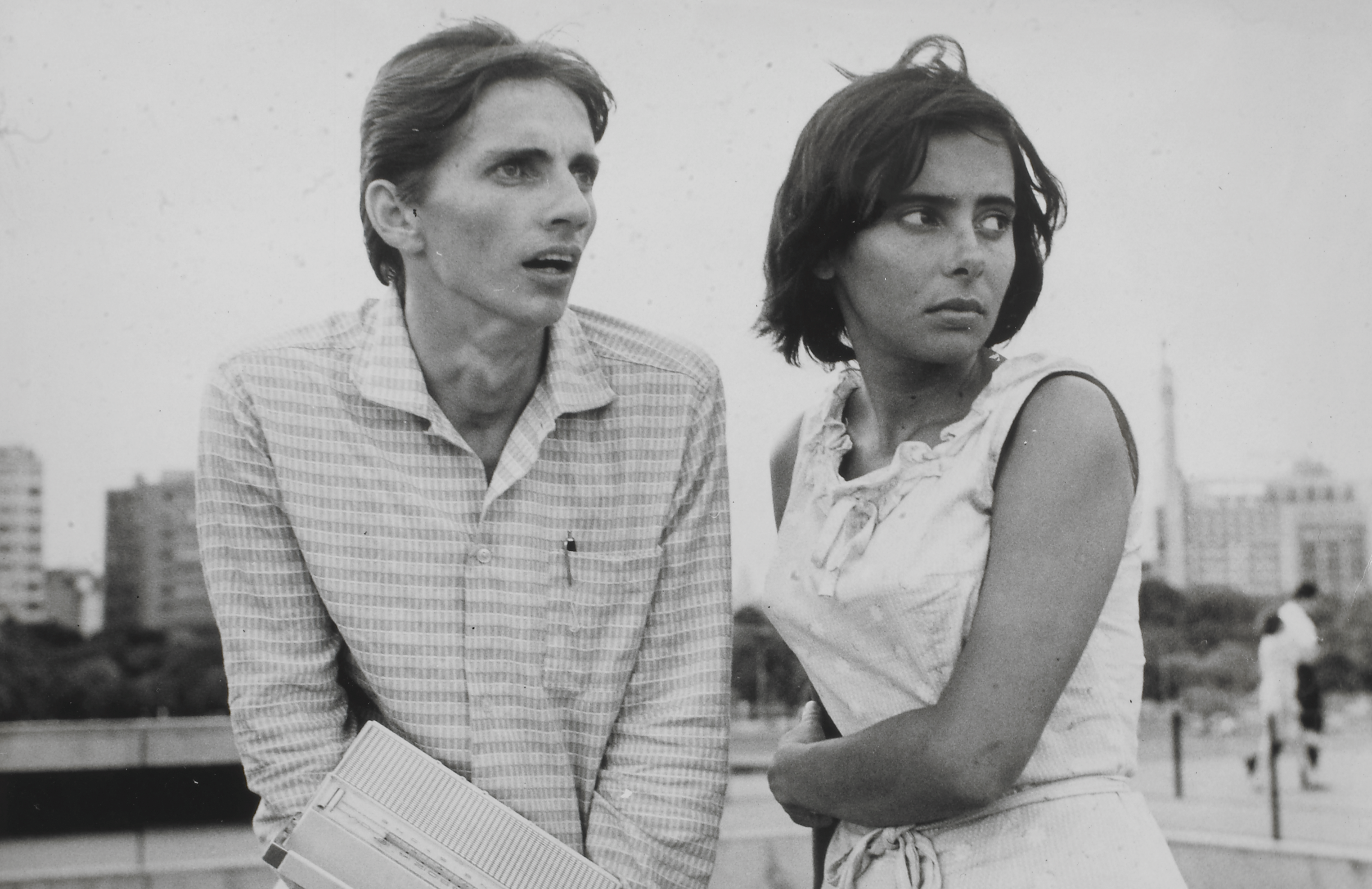
- Barcellos with Anecy Rocha in A Grande Cidade
- Born: 27 November 1936; Vitória, Espírito Santo, Brazil
- Died: 10 November 2018 (aged 81); Rio das Ostras, Rio de Janeiro, Brazil
- Occupation: Actor
- Years active: 1955-1997

Joel Dias Barcellos (27 November 1936 – 10 November 2018) was a Brazilian actor. He appeared in more than 50 films and television shows between 1955 and 1997. He starred in the 1974 film Sagarana: The Duel, which was entered into the 24th Berlin International Film Festival. In 2012 it was reported that he died while swimming, but this later turned out to be false. He later died of a stroke on 10 November 2018, aged 81.

== Selected filmography ==
- Os Fuzis (1964)
- My Home Is Copacabana (1965)
- Sagarana: The Duel (1974)
- Luz del Fuego (1982)
