= Todas as Mulheres do Mundo (film) =

- Directed by: Domingos de Oliveira
- Written by: Domingos de Oliveira
- Screenplay by: Joaquim Pedro de Andrade
- Based on: A Falseta and Memórias de Don Juan by Eduardo Prado
- Starring: Leila Diniz; Paulo José; Flávio Migliaccio; Joana Fomm; Ivan de Albuquerque
- Release date: 1966
- Running time: 86 minutes
- Country: Brazil
- Language: Portuguese

Todas as Mulheres do Mundo is a 1966 Brazilian comedy film directed by Domingos de Oliveira, based on the tales A Falseta and Memórias de Don Juan by Eduardo Prado.

== Cast ==
- Leila Diniz .... Maria Alice
- Paulo José .... Paulo
- Flávio Migliaccio .... Edu
- Joana Fomm ..... Barbara
- Ivan de Albuquerque .... Leopoldo
- Irma Álvarez .... Rita, garota Argentina
- Fauzi Arap .... Homem de São Paulo
- Isabel Ribeiro .... Dunia
- Anna Christina .... Ana Cristina
- Ana Maria Magalhães .... Ana Maria
- Frances Khan .... Frances
- Tânia Scher...Tânia

== Awards ==
1966: Brasília Film Festival

1. Best Film (won)
2. Best Director (Domingos de Oliveira) (won)
3. Best Actor (Paulo José) (won)
4. Best Story and Dialogue (Domingos de Oliveira) (won)
5. Special Mention (Leila Diniz) (won)
