= Tudo Bem =

1978 film

- Directed by: Arnaldo Jabor
- Screenplay by: Leopoldo Serran; Arnaldo Jabor
- Produced by: Arnaldo Jabor
- Starring: Fernanda Montenegro; Paulo Gracindo; Regina Casé; Zezé Motta
- Cinematography: Dib Lutfi
- Edited by: Gilberto Santeiro
- Production companies: Arnaldo Jabor Produções; Sagitário Produções Cinematográficas Ltda
- Distributed by: Embrafilme
- Release date: 29 July 1978 (Brazil)
- Running time: 111 minutes
- Country: Brazil
- Language: Portuguese

Tudo Bem (English: Everything's Alright) is a 1978 Brazilian drama film directed by Arnaldo Jabor. It stars Paulo Gracindo and Fernanda Montenegro.

== Cast ==
- Paulo Gracindo – Juarez Ramos Barata
- Fernanda Montenegro – Elvira Barata
- Regina Casé – Vera Lúcia
- Luiz Fernando Guimarães – Zé Roberto
- Zezé Motta – Zezé
- Paulo César Pereio – Bill Thompson
- Fernando Torres – Giacometti
- Luiz Linhares – Pedro Penteado
- Jorge Loredo – Juarez's friend
- Daniel Dantas – José Roberto's friend
- Maria Sílvia – Aparecida de Fátima
- José Dumont – Piauí
- Stênio Garcia – Zeca Maluco
- Anselmo Vasconcelos – Worker
- Guilherme Karan

== Accolades ==
1978: Festival de Brasília

1. Best Film (won)
2. Best Supporting Actor (Paulo César Peréio) (won)

1980: Taormina International Film Festival

1. Golden Charybdis (Nominee)
2. Best Actress (Fernanda Montenegro) (won)
