= Átila Iório =

Brazilian actor (1921–2002)

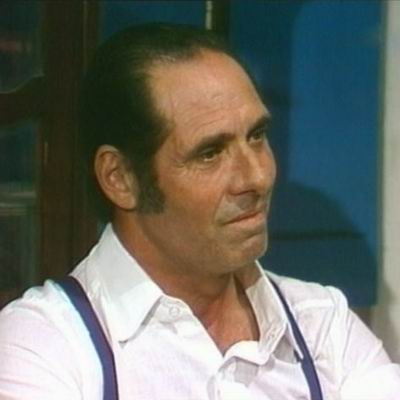
- Born: 1 April 1921; Rio de Janeiro, Brazil
- Died: 10 December 2002 (aged 81); Rio de Janeiro, Brazil
- Occupation: Actor
- Years active: 1946–1997

Átila Iório (1 April 1921 – 10 December 2002) was a Brazilian actor of Calabrese descent. He appeared in 48 films and television shows between 1946 and 1997. He starred in the 1964 film Os Fuzis, which won the Silver Bear Extraordinary Jury Prize at the 14th Berlin International Film Festival.

== Partial filmography ==
- Caídos do Céu (1946) – Roberto Boaventura
- Também Somos Irmãos (1949) – Delegado
- The Terrible Twosome (1953)
- A Baronesa Transviada (1957) – Lover in the movie
- Os Três Cangaceiros (1959)
- Virou Bagunça (1960) – Detective
- Os Dois Ladrões (1960) – Delegado
- Briga, Mulher e Samba (1960) – Valentino
- O Assalto ao Trem Pagador (1962) – Tonho
- Os Cosmonautas (1962) – Zeca
- Sonhando com Milhões (1963) – Arquimedes
- Barren Lives (1963) – Fabiano
- Quero Essa Mulher Assim Mesmo (1963)
- The Guns (1964) – Gaúcho
- Lana, Queen of the Amazons (1964) – Black guide / Casanova
- Um Morto ao Telefone (1964)
- 007 1/2 no Carnaval (1966)
- Panca de Valente (1968)
- As Aventuras de Chico Valente (1968)
- Os Carrascos Estão Entre Nós (1968) – Krueger
- No Paraíso das Solteironas (1969) – Delegado
- Deu a Louca no Cangaço (1969)
- 2000 Anos de Confusão (1969) – Ricardo Montebello
- A Guerra dos Pelados (1970)
- O Libertino (1973) – Dr. Mascarenhas
- Sagarana: The Duel (1974)
- Uma Tarde Outra Tarde (1974)
- O Filho do Chefão (1974)
- Ódio (1977) – Geraldão
- Ouro Sangrento (1977)
- Diário da Província (1978)
- O Sol dos Amantes (1979)
- The Emerald Forest (1985) – Trader
- Pedro Mico (1985)
- O Mistério de Robin Hood (1990)
- O Rei do Gado (1996, TV Series) – Caiçara
- Anjo Mau (1997, TV Series) – Josias
