= A Luz do Tom =

2013 film directed by Nelson Pereira dos Santos

- Directed by: Nelson Pereira dos Santos
- Written by: Miúcha; Nelson Pereira dos Santos
- Edited by: Alexandre Saggese; Luelane Correa
- Music by: Paulo Jobim
- Production company: Regina Filmes
- Distributed by: RioFilme; Bretz Filmes
- Release date: February 8, 2013 (Brazil)
- Running time: 88 minutes
- Country: Brazil
- Language: Portuguese

A Luz do Tom is a 2013 Brazilian documentary film directed by Nelson Pereira dos Santos.

Based on the book Antonio Carlos Jobim: um Homem Iluminado, written by Helena Jobim, the documentary follows the life and work of Antonio Carlos Jobim, better known as Tom Jobim. It discusses the relationship of the conductor and composer with women, including his sister, Helena Jobim, and his two wives, Teresa and Ana.
