= The Alienist (film) =

1970 film

- Film poster
- Directed by: Nelson Pereira dos Santos
- Written by: Nelson Pereira dos Santos
- Based on: O Alienista by Machado de Assis
- Produced by: Nelson Pereira dos Santos; Luiz Carlos Barreto; Roberto Farias; César Thedim
- Starring: Nildo Parente; Isabel Ribeiro
- Cinematography: Dib Lutfi
- Edited by: Rafael Justo Valverde
- Music by: Guilherme Magalhães Vaz
- Production company: Difilm
- Distributed by: Ipanema Filmes
- Release date: 29 November 1970
- Running time: 100 minutes
- Country: Brazil
- Language: Portuguese

The Alienist (Portuguese: Azyllo Muito Louco, also known as O Alienista) is a 1970 Brazilian comedy film directed by Nelson Pereira dos Santos. The film was entered into the 1970 Cannes Film Festival.

== Cast ==
- Nildo Parente as Father Simão Bacamarte
- Isabel Ribeiro as D. Evarista
- Arduíno Colassanti as Porfírio (as Arduino Colasanti)
- Irene Stefânia as Porfírio's lover (as Irene Stephania)
- Leila Diniz as Eudóxia
- Ana Maria Magalhães
- Nelson Dantas as The Accountant
- Ney Santanna as Imprisoned madman (uncredited)

== Production ==
It was shot in the city of Paraty in the state of Rio de Janeiro.
