= I Love You (1981 film) =

1981 film

- Film poster
- Directed by: Arnaldo Jabor
- Written by: Arnaldo Jabor; Leopoldo Serran
- Produced by: Walter Clark
- Starring: Sônia Braga; Paulo César Pereio
- Cinematography: Murilo Salles
- Edited by: Mair Tavares
- Music by: César Camargo Mariano
- Production company: Flávia Filmes
- Distributed by: Embrafilme
- Release date: 13 April 1981
- Running time: 110 minutes
- Country: Brazil
- Language: Portuguese

I Love You (Portuguese: Eu Te Amo) is a 1981 Brazilian drama film directed by Arnaldo Jabor. It was shot along the Rodrigo de Freitas Lagoon, Lagoa, Rio de Janeiro. It was screened in the Un Certain Regard section at the 1981 Cannes Film Festival.

== Plot ==
Maria (Braga) and Paulo (Pereio) are a couple who use each other to satisfy their sexual desires and to avoid their loneliness. However, they are not at all in love. Over time as their relationship continues, Maria and Paulo begin to realize that they are in fact falling for each other.

== Cast ==
- Sônia Braga as Maria
- Paulo César Pereio as Paulo
- Vera Fischer as Barbara Bergman
- Tarcísio Meira as Ulisses
- Regina Casé
- Maria Lúcia Dahl
- Maria Sílvia

== Awards and nominations ==
Festival de Gramado

- Won, "Best Actress" - Sônia Braga
- Won, "Best Cinematography" - Murilo Salles
- Won, "Best Production Design" - Marcos Weinstock
- Won, "Best Sound"
- Nominated, "Best Film" - Arnaldo Jabor

São Paulo Association of Art Critics Awards

- Won, "Best Cinematography" - Murilo Salles
- Won, "Best Director" - Arnaldo Jabor
