= Arduíno Colassanti =

Brazilian actor

- Born: Arduino Colasanti; 15 February 1936; Livorno, Italy
- Died: 22 February 2014 (aged 78)
- Occupation: Actor
- Years active: 1967–2010
- Spouse: Sônia Braga (m. 1970; sep. 1976)

Arduíno Colassanti (born Arduino Colasanti; 15 February 1936 – 22 February 2014) was an Italian-born Brazilian actor. He has appeared in 30 films since 1967. He starred in the 1968 film Hunger for Love, which was entered into the 18th Berlin International Film Festival. Three years later, he would star in the film How Tasty Was My Little Frenchman, which was entered into the 21st Berlin International Film Festival.

== Selected filmography ==
- Hunger for Love (1968)
- Brazil Year 2000 (1969)
- The Alienist (1970)
- How Tasty Was My Little Frenchman (1971)
- Quilombo (1984)
- Olho no Olho (1993)
