= Miguel Torres (actor) =

Brazilian writer and artist (1926–1962)

Miguel Torres de Andrade (November 1926 – December 31, 1962) was an internationally known Brazilian writer and actor.

Andrade was born in Curaçá, Bahia. Some of his movies were nominees for Oscars. He died, aged 36, in Cajazeiras, Paraíba.

== Filmography as writer ==
- Os Fuzis (1964)... aka The Guns
- Sol Sobre a Lama (1963)
- Vencidos, Os (1963) (story)
- Três Cabras de Lampião (1962)... aka Three Henchmen of Lampião
- Os Cafajestes (1962)... aka The Unscrupulous Ones
- Pupilas do Senhor Reitor, As (1961)
