= Ítala Nandi =

Brazilian actress

- Born: 4 June 1942 (age 83); Rio Grande do Sul, Brazil
- Occupation: Actress
- Years active: 1964–present

Ítala Nandi (born 4 June 1942) is a Brazilian actress. She has appeared in 33 films and television shows since 1964. She starred in the 1974 film Sagarana: The Duel, which was entered into the 24th Berlin International Film Festival.

== Selected filmography ==
- Pindorama (1970)
- Of Gods and the Undead (1970)
- Awakening of the Beast (1970)
- Sagarana: The Duel (1974)
- Luz del Fuego (1982)
- Direito de Amar (1987)
