= The Oyster and the Wind =

1997 film by Walter Lima, Jr.

- Directed by: Walter Lima Jr.
- Screenplay by: Walter Lima Jr. Flávio R. Tambellini
- Based on: A Ostra e o Vento by Moacir C. Lopes
- Produced by: Flávio R. Tambellini
- Starring: Lima Duarte; Fernando Torres; Leandra Leal
- Cinematography: Pedro Farkas
- Edited by: Johnny Jardim
- Distributed by: Ravina Produções
- Release date: September 26, 1997 (Brazil)
- Running time: 112 minutes
- Country: Brazil
- Language: Portuguese
- Budget: R$ 2 million

The Oyster and the Wind (Portuguese: A Ostra e o Vento) is a 1997 Brazilian drama film directed by Walter Lima Jr., based on the book by Moacir C. Lopes. It premiered at the 54th edition of the Venice Film Festival, where it competed in the main competition.

== Cast ==
- Lima Duarte as José
- Leandra Leal as Marcela
- Fernando Torres as Daniel
- Castrinho as Pepe
- Floriano Peixoto as Roberto
- Márcio Vito as Carrera
- Débora Bloch as Marcela's mother
- Hannah Brauer as Marcela child

== Awards ==
1997: Biarritz Film Festival

1. Best Actress (Leandra Leal) (won)

1997: Venice Film Festival

1. Golden Lion (Nominee)
2. CinemAvvenire Award (won)

1998: Fribourg International Film Festival

1. Don Quixote Award (won)

1998: São Paulo Association of Art Critics Awards

1. Best Film
2. Most Promising Actress (Leandra Leal) (won)
3. Best Cinematography (Pedro Farkas) (won)
