= The Third Bank of the River (film) =

1994 film

- Film poster
- Directed by: Nelson Pereira dos Santos
- Written by: Nelson Pereira dos Santos
- Based on: Primeiras Estórias by João Guimarães Rosa
- Produced by: Ney Santanna; Dora Sverner
- Starring: Ilya São Paulo
- Cinematography: Gilberto Azevedo; Fernando Duarte
- Edited by: Carlos Alberto Camuyrano; Luelane Corrêa
- Music by: Milton Nascimento
- Production company: Regina Filmes
- Distributed by: Riofilme
- Release date: 18 February 1994
- Running time: 98 minutes
- Country: Brazil
- Language: Portuguese

The Third Bank of the River (Portuguese: A Terceira Margem do Rio) is a 1994 Brazilian drama film directed by Nelson Pereira dos Santos. It is based on the short stories "A Menina de Lá", "Os Irmãos Dagobé", "Fatalidade", "Seqüência", and "A Terceira Margem do Rio" by João Guimarães Rosa compiled into the book Primeiras Estórias. It was entered into the 44th Berlin International Film Festival.

== Cast ==
- Ilya São Paulo as Liojorge
- Sonia Saurin as Alva
- Barbara Brandt as Nhinhinha
- Maria Ribeiro as mother
- Mariane Vicentini as Rosário
- Chico Díaz as Rogério
- Henrique Rovira as Herculinão
- Waldir Onofre as Dismundo
- Ana Maria Nascimento e Silva
- Vanja Orico
- Affonso Brazza
- Joffre Soares
