= Carolina Jabor =

- Born: 1 March 1975 (age 50); Rio de Janeiro, Brazil
- Occupation(s): Director, producer
- Spouse: Guel Arraes (2003–present)
- Parent: Arnaldo Jabor (father)

Carolina Jabor (born 1 March 1975) is a Brazilian director and producer.

== Biography ==
The daughter of screenwriter and journalist Arnaldo Jabor, Carolina has been a partner of Conspiração since 2000.

In 2008, as co-director with Lula Buarque de Hollanda, they released the documentary O Mistério do Samba about the Old Guard of Portela, was selected for Cannes Film Festival and was selected for the Grande Prêmio do Cinema Brasileiro for best documentary. She released her first feature film, Boa Sorte, in 2014, and starred Deborah Secco and João Pedro Zappa.

She released her second film, Aos Teus Olhos in 2018. Well received by critics, the film was screened at various national and international festivals, being chosen by the jury as the best fiction film at the 41st edition of the São Paulo International Film Festival and was awarded with four Troféus awards at the Rio de Janeiro International Film Festival. The movie was also screened at the 2018 Vancouver International Film Festival.

In regards to TV productions, Jabor has directed some episodes of Magnífica 70 (HBO), about the universe of the Boca do Lixo neighborhood during the Brazilian military dictatorship. She also produced and directed episodes of the series A Mulher Invisível (Globo), a winner of an International Emmy in the comedic series category. In 2018, Jabor was the artistic director of Desnude, the first series for TV on the platform Hysteria, whose management is made up of women that came from Conspiração.

Jabor has been married to fellow director and filmmaker Guel Arraes since 2003.

== Filmography ==
Year	Title	Credited as			Film type
Year	Title	Director	Screenwriter	Producer	Film type
2008	O Mistério do Samba	Yes	No	No	Documentary
2014	Boa Sorte	Yes	No	Yes	Feature film
2018	Aos Teus Olhos	Yes	No	Yes	Feature film
2021	L.O.C.A.	No	No	Yes	Feature film
2022	Transe	Yes	Yes	Yes	Feature film
