= The Age of the Earth =

1980 Brazilian film directed by Glauber Rocha

- Theatrical release poster
- Directed by: Glauber Rocha
- Written by: Glauber Rocha
- Based on: A Idade da Terra by Castro Alves
- Produced by: Glauber Rocha
- Starring: Ana Maria Magalhães; Antonio Pitanga; Danuza Leão; Geraldo Del Rey; Jece Valadão; Maurício do Valle; Norma Bengell; Tarcísio Meira
- Cinematography: Roberto Pires; Pedro de Moraes
- Edited by: Carlos Cox; Raul Soares; Ricardo Miranda
- Music by: Rogério Duarte
- Production companies: Glauber Rocha Produções; Embrafilme
- Distributed by: Embrafilme
- Release date: November 17, 1980
- Running time: 154 minutes
- Country: Brazil
- Language: Portuguese

The Age of the Earth (Portuguese: A Idade da Terra, pronounced [a iˈdadʒi da ˈtɛʁɐ]) is a 1980 Brazilian avant-garde film directed by Glauber Rocha. It was his final film.

The film had its world premiere at the Golden Lion competition of the 1980 Venice Film Festival.

== Cast ==
- Maurício do Valle as John Brahms
- Jece Valadão as Indian Christ (Cristo Índio)
- Antonio Pitanga as Black Christ (Cristo Negro)
- Tarcísio Meira as Military Christ (Cristo Militar)
- Geraldo Del Rey as Guerilla Christ (Cristo Guerrilheiro)
- Ana Maria Magalhães as Aurora Madalena
- Norma Bengell as Amazonas Queen (Rainha das Amazonas)
- Carlos Petrovich as the Devil (O Diabo)
- Mário Gusmão as Babalaô
- Danuza Leão as Brahms' wife
- Paloma Rocha

== Production ==
Rocha started the film in 1975 and planned to shoot it in Los Angeles, and subsequently proposed it in Paris, Rome, Mexico and Venezuela, but was unable to obtain financial support.

It was finally shot in Bahia, Brasilia, and Rio de Janeiro.

== Reception ==
It was Rocha's last film and the one that caused the most controversy.

It was produced by Embrafilme, a state-funded company, during the Brazilian military dictatorship, despite this, filmmakers had some level of creative freedom while shooting, the dictatorship used to impose its heavy censorship after productions had been completed. Rocha himself had been living in exile during the 70's, after numerous attempts of the censorship were made to Entranced Earth (1967) and Antonio das Mortes (1969).

Regardless, it was boycotted by international critics and "crucified" at the 1980 Venice Film Festival, especially after an argument between Rocha and Louis Malle at the presence of numerous journalists, shortly after the Golden Lion results were announced. Atlantic City, directed by Malle, had won the main prize and was deemed imperialist, by Rocha: "You won because your film was produced by Gaumont, an imperialist multinational"
