= Ana Maria Magalhães =

Brazilian film actress and director (born 1950)

- Born: Ana Maria Portinho Magalhães; January 21, 1950 (age 76); Rio de Janeiro, Brazil

Ana Maria Portinho Magalhães (born January 21, 1950) is a Brazilian film actress and director.

She is known for protesting against the arrest of Iranian filmmaker Jafar Panahi, detained on 1 March 2010 and held in ward 209 of the Evin prison.

== Filmography ==
=== As actor ===
- 1965 - Arrastão
- 1967 - Todas as Mulheres do Mundo
- 1967 - Garota de Ipanema
- 1967 - O Diabo Mora no Sangue
- 1970 - The Alienist
- 1971 - A Guerra dos Pelados
- 1971 - Mãos Vazias
- 1972 - How Tasty Was My Little Frenchman
- 1972 - Minha Namorada
- 1972 - O Doce Esporte do Sexo
- 1972 - Os Devassos
- 1972 - Quando o Carnaval Chegar
- 1973 - Joanna Francesa
- 1973 - Quem É Beta?
- 1973 - Uirá, um Índio em Busca de Deus
- 1973 - Sagarana: The Duel
- 1975 - As Deliciosas Traições do Amor
- 1975 - Amantes, Amanhã Se Houver Sol
- 1976 - Paranóia
- 1977 - Lucio Flavio
- 1977 - Se Segura, Malandro
- 1978 - Anchieta, José do Brasil
- 1981 - The Age of the Earth
- 1980 - Os Sete Gatinhos
- 1983 - Os Trapalhões na Serra Pelada
- 1984 - Tensão no Rio
- 1990 - Real Desejo
- 1992 - Oswaldianas
