= Tenda dos Milagres (film) =

1977 film

- Theatrical release poster
- Directed by: Nelson Pereira dos Santos
- Written by: Nelson Pereira dos Santos
- Based on: Tenda dos Milagres by Jorge Amado
- Produced by: Nelson Pereira dos Santos
- Starring: Hugo Carvana
- Cinematography: Hélio Silva
- Edited by: Raimundo Higino; Severino Dadá
- Music by: Gilberto Gil; Jards Macalé
- Production company: Regina Filmes
- Distributed by: Embrafilme
- Release date: 30 July 1977
- Running time: 132 minutes
- Country: Brazil
- Language: Portuguese

Tenda dos Milagres is a 1977 Brazilian drama film written and directed by Nelson Pereira dos Santos, based on the 1967 novel of the same name by Jorge Amado. Starring Hugo Carvana, Sonia Dias and Severino Dada, it exposes and satirizes racism in Brazilian society—the most notable example being a flashback scene where Brazilians are shown listening with approving interest to Nazi race theories in the late 1930s. Tenda dos Milagres was shot in Salvador, Bahia.

== Cast ==
- Hugo Carvana as Fausto Pena
- Sônia Dias as Anna Mercedes
- Anecy Rocha as Dr. Edelweiss
- Franca Teixeira
- Mae Mirinha do Portao
- Juárez Paraíso as Pedro Archanjo
- Jards Macalé as Young Pedro
- Jehova De Carvalho as Major Damiao
- Manoel do Bonfim as Lidia Corro
- Nildo Parente as Prof. Nilo Argolo

== Reception ==
=== Awards and nominations ===
It won the Best Film Award and Best Score Award, and dos Santos won the Best Director Award and Dias the Best Supporting Actress Award at the 10th Festival de Brasília. It was entered into the 27th Berlin International Film Festival. The film was also selected as the Brazilian entry for the Best Foreign Language Film at the 50th Academy Awards, but was not accepted as a nominee.

== See also ==
- List of submissions to the 50th Academy Awards for Best Foreign Language Film
- List of Brazilian submissions for the Academy Award for Best Foreign Language Film
