= Leila Diniz =

Brazilian actress

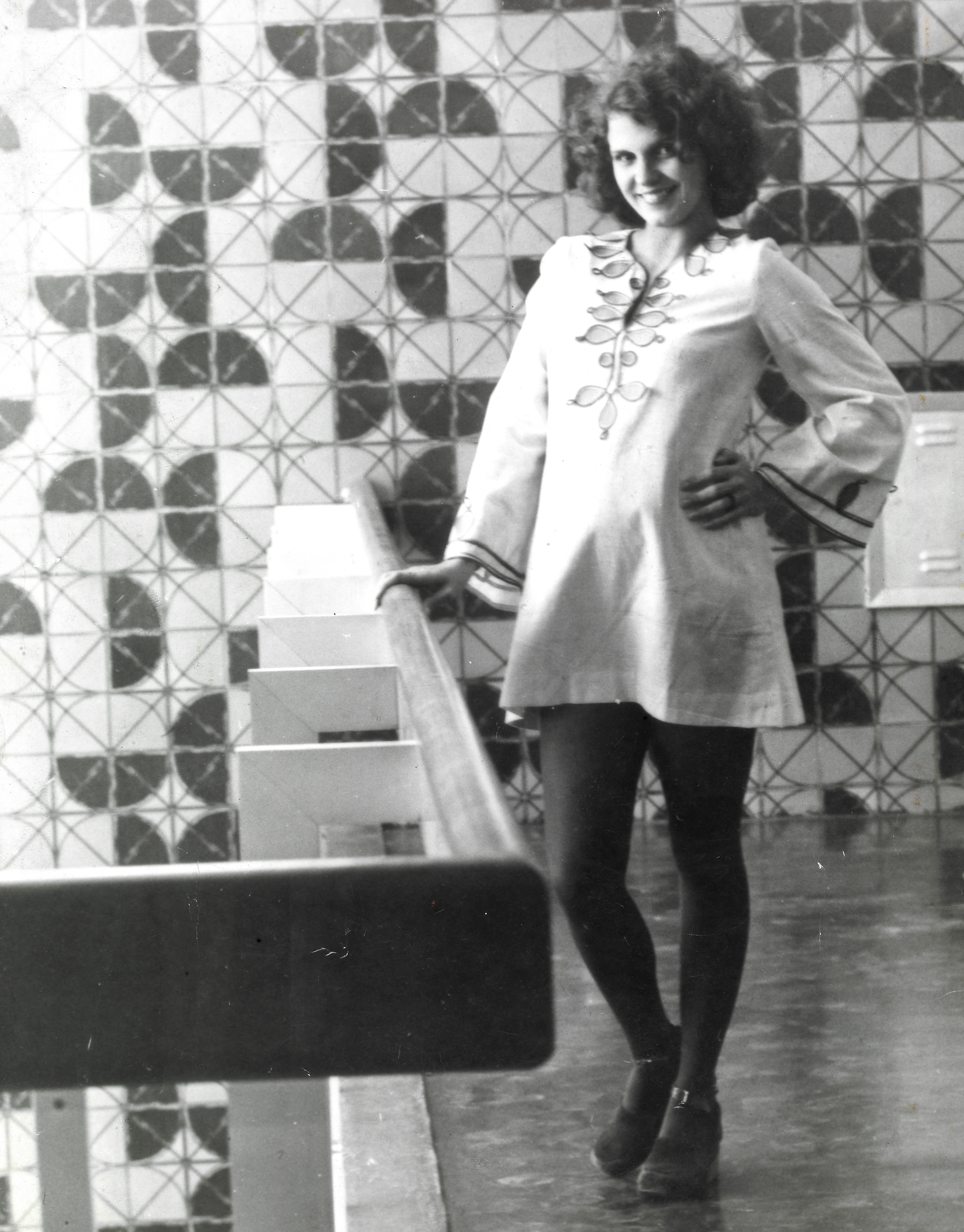
- Diniz in 1971
- Born: Leila Roque Diniz; 25 March 1945; Niterói, Rio de Janeiro, Brazil
- Died: 14 June 1972 (aged 27) near New Delhi, India
- Occupation: Actress
- Years active: 1962–1972
- Spouses: Domingos de Oliveira (m. 1962; sep. 1965) Ruy Guerra (m. 1971)
- Children: 1

Leila Roque Diniz (25 March 1945 – 14 June 1972) was a Brazilian television, film and stage actress, whose liberal ideas and attitudes about sex had raised the discontent of both the feminists and the Brazilian military government of the 1960s.

She died on 14 June 1972, aged 27, at the peak of fame, in an aircraft accident near New Delhi, India.

== Biography ==
Born in a middle-class family and the daughter of a communist activist, Leila worked as a kindergarten teacher at age 15. At age 17, she met movie director Domingos de Oliveira, with whom she lived until age 21. Between 1962 and 1964 she had minor roles on stage.

In 1965, Diniz started working in television, where she made several telenovelas and various commercials. In 1967, she also started to make movies.

In 1969, she gave an interview to the satirical newspaper O Pasquim during which she said: "It's possible to love one person and go to bed with another. It has happened to me." Due to statements like that and the many profanities (albeit replaced with asterisks) that she said during the interview, the article angered the military, and Alfredo Buzaid, Minister of Justice of President Emílio Garrastazu Médici's government, used it as a pretext to decree censorship to all newspapers and magazines in Brazil. The law was known as the "Leila Diniz decree" due to this incident. Diniz had her contract with TV Globo terminated under grounds of "moral problems," but in 1970 she was hired as a juror of TV host Flávio Cavalcanti's show on TV Tupi (Cavalcanti, curiously, had a reputation as a "right-wing" man, yet he not only hired Diniz, but protected her and hid her in his country house when she was persecuted by the military repressive forces).

In 1971, Leila had a short participation as a burlesque star. In the same year, she married movie director Ruy Guerra, father of her only daughter. She offended the conservative members of society by going to the beach in bikini when six months pregnant, but expressed surprise at the reaction, saying that the doctor just had recommended the sun as beneficial to her pregnancy and her unborn child.

In 1972, coming back from a movie festival in Australia, where she won a Best Actress award for the movie Mãos Vazias ("Empty Hands"), she died in the Japan Air Lines Flight 471 crash in India.

== Filmography ==
- 1966: Todas as Mulheres do Mundo - Maria Alice
- 1967: Juego Peligroso - Servant (segment "Divertimento")
- 1967: O Mundo Alegre de Helô - Luisinha
- 1967: Mineirinho, Vivo ou Morto - Maria
- 1968: Edu, Coração de Ouro - Tatiana
- 1968: Hunger for Love - Ulla
- 1968: O Homem Nu - Mariana
- 1968: A Madona de Cedro - Marta
- 1969: Os Paqueras - herself
- 1969: Corisco, o Diabo Loiro - Dadá
- 1970: O Donzelo - herself (cameo)
- 1970: The Alienist - Eudóxia
- 1971: Mãos Vazias - Ida
- 1972: Amor, Carnaval e Sonhos
- 1977: O Dia Marcado - (final film role)

=== About her ===
- 1987: Leila Diniz (with Louise Cardoso)
