= Paulo Thiago (director) =

Brazilian film director (1945–2021)

- Born: 8 October 1945; Minas Gerais, Brazil
- Died: 5 June 2021 (aged 75)
- Occupations: Film director, screenwriter, film producer
- Years active: 1970–2021

Paulo Thiago (8 October 1945 – 5 June 2021) was a Brazilian film director, screenwriter and producer. At the time of his death in 2021, he had directed 13 films since 1970. His 1974 film Sagarana: The Duel was entered into the 24th Berlin International Film Festival.

== Selected filmography ==
- Sagarana: The Duel (1974)
- The Long Haul (1988)
