= Jece Valadão =

Brazilian actor & producer (1930–2006)

Jece Valadão, pseudonym of Gecy Valadão (July 24, 1930 – November 27, 2006), was a Brazilian actor, director and producer. He became known by his cafajeste (a womanizing, roguish crook) roles in films such as Rio 40 graus (1955) and Os Cafajestes (1962).

== Career ==
Born in Campos dos Goytacazes in the interior of Rio de Janeiro, he was raised in Cachoeiro de Itapemirim in Espírito Santo, due to the transfer of his father, a railroader, to the city. He moved to Rio de Janeiro alone, where he began his theatrical studies, thus forming himself as an actor, acting in cinema, stage and television. In addition to acting in more than one hundred films, he also specialized as a director and producer. In the 1970s, he was an actor and, mainly, a producer of comedies and erotic police films. One of his last appearances on television was in the HBO Latin America series Filhos do Carnaval.

== Personal life ==
Valadão was married six times, the last one to actress Vera Gimenez from 1974 until his death in 2006. From this marriage he had a son: actor Marco Antônio Gimenez (b.1981) The artist was also the stepfather of television presenter Luciana Gimenez. Valadão had a total of nine children from previous relationships. In 1995, he was converted to Protestantism, even becoming pastor of an Assembly of God church.

On November 21, 2006, Jece Valadão felt ill and was admitted to the ICU of the Panamericano Hospital, in São Paulo, and at 5:20 pm on November 27, he died due to respiratory failure. He was buried in Jardim da Saudade Cemitério Parque, in the city of Cachoeiro de Itapemirim.

== Filmography ==
Film

- 2007 - Encarnação do Demônio
- 2006 - 5 Frações de uma Quase História
- 2003 - Garrincha, estrela solitária
- 1997 - O cangaceiro
- 1996 - Tieta do agreste
- 1984 - Águia na cabeça
- 1981 - O torturador
- 1981 - A Idade da Terra
- 1979 - Eu matei Lúcio Flávio
- 1978 - O Gigante da América
- 1977 - Quem matou Pacífico?
- 1976 - A nudez de Alexandra
- 1976 - Ninguém segura essas mulheres
- 1976 - A noite dos assassinos
- 1976 - O homem de papel
- 1975 - Nós, Os Canalhas
- 1974 - O mau caráter
- 1973 - Tercer Mundo
- 1973 - Um edifício chamado 200
- 1973 - A Filha de Madame Betina
- 1973 - Obsessão
- 1972 - Ali Babá e os Quarenta Ladrões
- 1972 - A difícil vida fácil
- 1971 - O enterro da cafetina
- 1970 - Memórias de um gigolô
- 1969 - O matador profissional
- 1969 - A navalha na carne
- 1969 - Quelé do Pajeú
- 1969 - Os raptores
- 1968 - As sete faces de um cafajeste
- 1967 - A espiã que entrou em fria
- 1967 - Mineirinho vivo ou morto
- 1967 - A lei do cão
- 1966 - Paraíba, vida e morte de um bandido
- 1965 - História de um crápula
- 1965 - 22-2000 Cidade Aberta
- 1964 - Asfalto selvagem
- 1963 - Boca de ouro
- 1963 - Bonitinha mas ordinária
- 1962 - Os cafajestes
- 1961 - Mulheres e milhões
- 1960 - Favela
- 1960 - Tudo Legal
- 1959 - Mulher de fogo
- 1957 - Garotas e Samba
- 1957 - Rio Zona Norte
- 1955 - Rio, 40 graus
- 1955 - Almas em conflito
- 1954 - Carnaval em Caxias
- 1952 - Barnabé tu és meu
- 1952 - Amei um bicheiro
- 1952 - Três vagabundos
- 1949 - Também somos irmãos
- 1949 - Carnaval no fogo

=== Television ===
- 1959 - Trágica Mentira - (TV Tupi)
- 1964 - O Desconhecido
- 1965 - 22-2000 Cidade Aberta
- 1970 - Pigmalião 70
- 1972 - Tempo de viver (1972)
- 1979 - Os Trapalhões
- 1984 - Transas e Caretas
- 1986 - Anos Dourados
- 1988 - Olho por Olho
- 1990 - Pantanal
- 1991 - O Fantasma da Ópera
- 1991 - O Dono do Mundo
- 1993 - Contos de Verão
- 1994 - Memorial de Maria Moura
- 1996 - A vida como ela é
- 2000, 1994, 1992 - Você decide
- 2005 - Bang Bang
- 2006 - Cidadão Brasileiro
- 2006 - Filhos do Carnaval
