= The Unscrupulous Ones =

1962 film directed by Ruy Guerra

- Theatrical release poster
- Directed by: Ruy Guerra
- Written by: Ruy Guerra; Miguel Torres
- Produced by: José Sanz; Gerson Tavares; Jece Valadão
- Starring: Jece Valadão; Norma Bengell; Daniel Filho
- Cinematography: Tony Rabatoni
- Edited by: Nelo Melli; Zélia Feijó Costa
- Music by: Luís Bonfá
- Production companies: Magnus Filmes; Herbert Richers
- Distributed by: Sinofilmes
- Release date: 24 March 1962
- Running time: 100 minutes
- Country: Brazil
- Language: Portuguese

The Unscrupulous Ones (Portuguese: Os Cafajestes) is a 1962 Brazilian crime film directed by Ruy Guerra. It was entered into the 12th Berlin International Film Festival.

== Cast ==
- Jece Valadão - Jandir
- Norma Bengell - Leda
- Daniel Filho - Vavá
- Hugo Carvana
- Lucy de Carvalho - Vilma
- Germana de Lamare
- Marina Ferraz
- Glauce Rocha
- Aline Silva
- Fátima Somer
