= Domingos de Oliveira =

Brazilian screenwriter and film director (1936–2019)

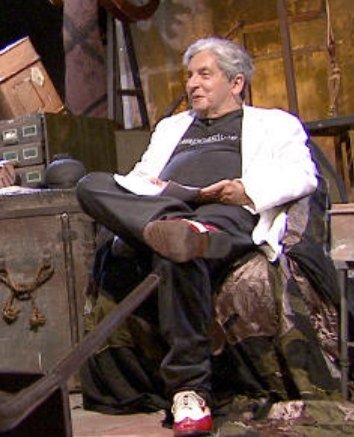
- Born: Domingos José Soares de Oliveira; 28 September 1936; Rio de Janeiro, Brazil
- Died: 23 March 2019 (aged 82); Rio de Janeiro, Brazil
- Occupation: Filmmaker

Domingos José Soares de Oliveira (28 September 1936 – 23 March 2019) was a Brazilian film, stage and television director, playwright, screenwriter and actor.

== Life and career ==
Born in Rio de Janeiro, de Oliveira graduated in electrical engineering. He made his debut as playwright in 1966 with the critically acclaimed drama Somos todos do jardim de infância, starring his wife of the time Leila Diniz.

After working on television, in 1966 de Oliveira made his film debut with an adaptation of one of his plays, Todas as mulheres do mundo, which won numerous awards including twelve prizes at the Festival de Brasília. His film Separações was awarded best film at the 2003 Mar del Plata International Film Festival. His 2008 film Juventude won four awards at the Festival de Gramado including best director. He won again the award for best director as well as the Kikiko for best film at the Festival de Gramado for his 2016 film Barata Ribeiro, 716.

Suffering from Parkinson's disease for about twenty years, de Oliveira died on 28 December 2019, at the age of 82. He was married for 38 years to actress Priscilla Rozembaum.
