= Arnaldo Jabor =

Brazilian film director (1940–2022)

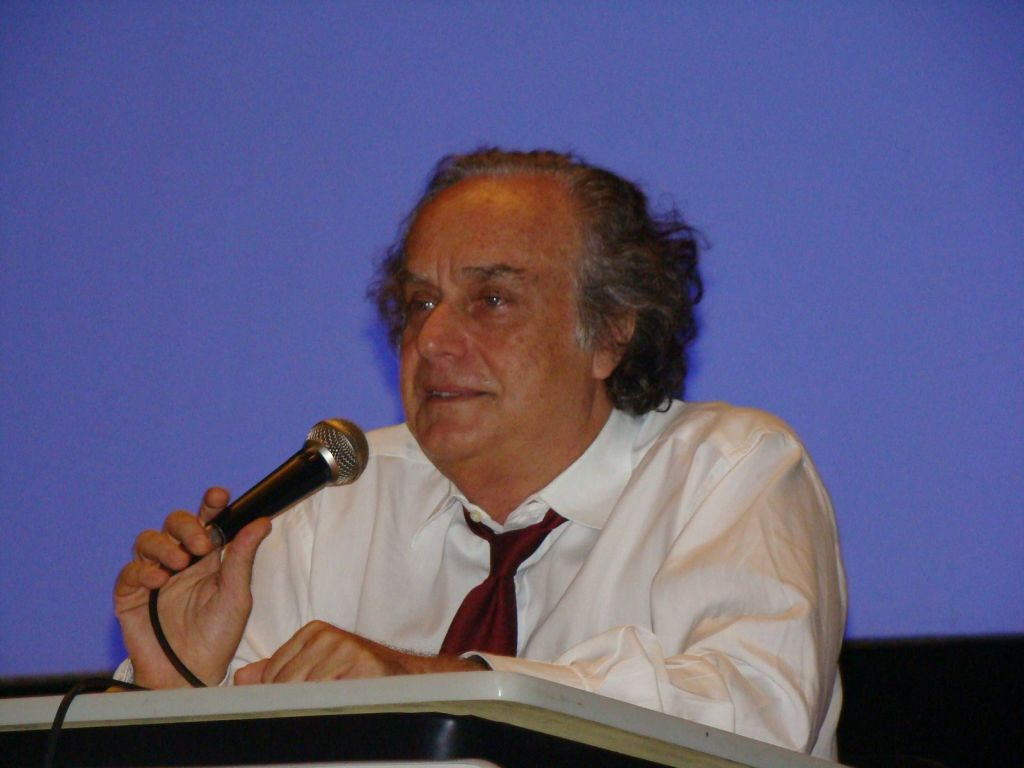
- Born: 12 December 1940; Rio de Janeiro, Brazil
- Died: 15 February 2022 (aged 81); São Paulo, Brazil
- Education: Pontifical Catholic University of Rio de Janeiro
- Occupations: Film director, screenwriter, journalist, writer
- Years active: 1965-2021
- Children: Carolina Jabor

Arnaldo Jabor (12 December 1940 – 15 February 2022) was a Brazilian film director and producer, screenwriter, writer, journalist and political pundit for Brazilian television network Rede Globo.

== Biography ==
He was of Jewish Lebanese descent and identified as an atheist.

Initially associated with the Cinema Novo movement with his first fiction feature Pindorama (1970), Jabor went on directing nine films between 1965 and 1990. His 1973 film All Nudity Shall Be Punished won the Silver Bear at the 23rd Berlin International Film Festival. In the 1980s, Jabor reached critical and commercial success with his erotically-charged psychological romantic dramas I Love You (1981) and Love Me Forever or Never (1986), with the latter gathering a Palm d'Or nomination at the 39th Cannes Film Festival.

At the end of his filmmaking career, he considered his satirical comedy Tudo Bem (1978) as his best film.

Jabor died as a result of a stroke in São Paulo on 15 February 2022, at the age of 81. He is survived by a daughter, Carolina Jabor.

== Filmography ==
- O Circo (1965)
- A Opinião Pública (1967)
- Pindorama (1970)
- All Nudity Shall Be Punished (1973)
- O Casamento (1976)
- Tudo Bem (1978)
- I Love You (1981)
- Love Me Forever or Never (1986)
- Carnaval (1990)
- A Suprema Felicidade (2010)
- Meu Último Desejo (TBA)

== Bibliography ==
- Os canibais estão na sala de jantar (Editora Siciliano, 1993)
- Sanduíches de Realidade (Editora Objetiva, 1997)
- A invasão das Salsichas Gigantes (Editora Objetiva, 2001)
- Amor É Prosa, Sexo É Poesia (Editora Objetiva, 2004)
- Pornopolítica, (Editora Objetiva, 2006)
- Eu Sei Que Vou Te Amar, (Editora Objetiva, 2007)
