= Archer Winsten =

American film critic (1904–1997)

Archer Winsten (September 18, 1904 – February 21, 1997) was an American film critic from the late 1930s through the early 1980s. He was a graduate of Princeton University and a judge for many years of the International Ski Film Festival when it was held annually in New York City. For many years, he regularly reviewed movies for the New York Post.
