= Nádia Lippi =

Brazilian actress

- Born: March 12, 1956 (age 69); São Paulo, Brazil
- Occupation: Actor

Nádia Lippi (born 12 March 1956 in São Paulo) is a Brazilian actress. She has appeared in the soap operas Um Dia, O Amor, Pai Herói and Brilhante. She played Lady Jane Grey in a 1972 Brazilian TV adaptation of The Prince and the Pauper.
