= Pindorama (film) =

1970 film

- Film poster
- Directed by: Arnaldo Jabor
- Written by: Antônio Calmon; Arnaldo Jabor
- Produced by: Arnaldo Jabor; Walter Hugo Khouri; William Khouri
- Starring: Maurício do Valle
- Cinematography: Affonso Beato
- Edited by: Arnaldo Jabor; João Ramiro Mello
- Release date: 1970
- Running time: 95 minutes
- Country: Brazil
- Language: Portuguese

Pindorama is a 1970 Brazilian drama film directed and co-written by Arnaldo Jabor. It was entered into the 1971 Cannes Film Festival.

== Cast ==
- Maurício do Valle
- Ítala Nandi
- Jesus Pingo
- Hugo Carvana
- José De Freitas
- Wilson Grey
- Vinícius Salvatori
- Tep Kahok
- Maria Regina
- Manoel De Gaveira
- Raimundo Arcanjo
- Jacena R. Costa
- Harildo Deda
- Mário Gusmão
