= João Guimarães Rosa =

Brazilian novelist, short story writer, and diplomat (1908–1967)

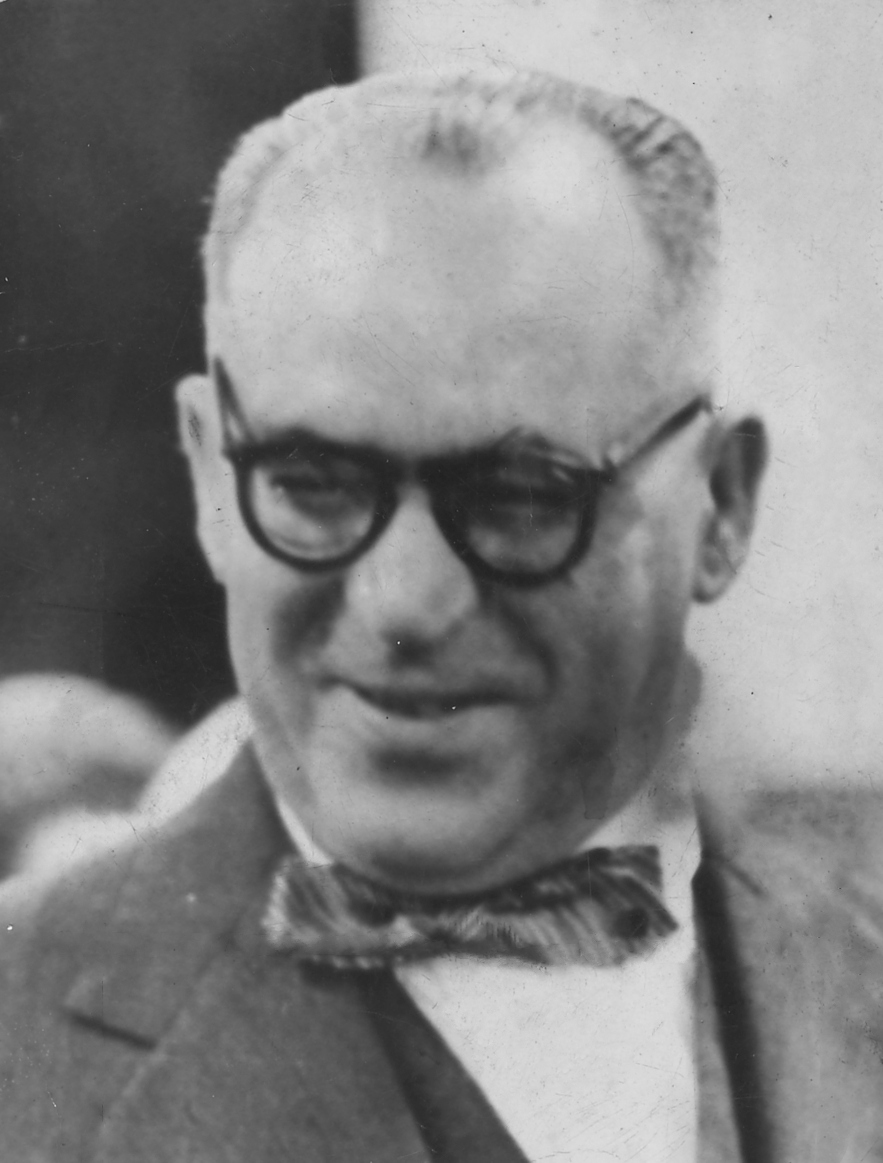
- Rosa, 1960s

3rd Academic of the 2nd chair of the Brazilian Academy of Letters
- In office 16 November 1963 – 19 November 1967
- Preceded by: João Neves da Fontoura
- Succeeded by: Mário Palmério

Personal details
- Born: 27 June 1908 Cordisburgo, Minas Gerais, Brazil
- Died: 19 November 1967 (aged 59) Rio de Janeiro, Guanabara, Brazil
- Education: Federal University of Minas Gerais
- Occupation: Author, novelist, short story writer
- Profession: Diplomat and medical doctor

João Guimarães Rosa (/ˈʒwaʊn ɡiːməˈraɪnz/ ZHWOWN ghee-mə-RYNEZ; Portuguese: [ʒuˈɐ̃w ɡimaˈɾɐ̃jz ˈʁɔzɐ, ˈʒwɐ̃w -]; 27 June 1908 – 19 November 1967) was a Brazilian novelist, short story writer, poet and diplomat.

Rosa wrote only one novel, Grande Sertão: Veredas (known in English as The Devil to Pay in the Backlands), a revolutionary text for its blend of archaic and colloquial prose and frequent use of neologisms, taking inspiration from the spoken language of the Brazilian backlands. For its profoundly philosophical themes, the critic Antonio Candido described the book as a "metaphysical novel". It is often considered to be the Brazilian equivalent of James Joyce's Ulysses.In a 2002, poll by the Bokklubben World Library, "Grande Sertão: Veredas" was named among the best 100 books of all time. Rosa also published four books of short stories in his lifetime, all of them revolving around the life in the sertão, but also addressing themes of universal literature and of existential nature. He died in 1967 — the year he was nominated for the Nobel Prize in Literature — due to a heart attack.

== Biography ==
Guimarães Rosa was born in Cordisburgo in the Brazilian state of Minas Gerais, the first of six children of Florduardo Pinto Rosa (nicknamed "seu Fulô") and Francisca Guimarães Rosa ("Chiquitinha"). He was self-taught in many areas and studied several languages from childhood, starting with French before he was seven years old. He later claimed,

"I speak: Portuguese, German, French, English, Spanish, Italian, Esperanto, some Russian; I read: Swedish, Dutch, Latin and Greek (but with the dictionary right next to me); I understand some German dialects; I studied the grammar of: Hungarian, Arabic, Sanskrit, Lithuanian, Polish, Tupi, Hebrew, Japanese, Czech, Finnish, Danish; I dabbled in others. But all at a very basic level. And I think that studying the spirit and the mechanism of other languages helps greatly to more deeply understand the national language [of Brazil]. In general, however, I studied for pleasure, desire, distraction".

Still a child, he moved to his grandparents' house in Belo Horizonte, where he finished primary school. He began his secondary schooling at the Santo Antônio School in São João del-Rei, but soon returned to Belo Horizonte, where he graduated. In 1925, at only 16, he enrolled in the College of Medicine of Federal University of Minas Gerais.

On June 27, 1930, he married Lígia Cabral Penna, a sixteen-year-old girl, with whom he was to have two daughters, Vilma and Agnes. In that same year, he graduated and began his medical practice in Itaguara, where he stayed for nearly two years. In this town, Rosa had his first contact with elements from the sertão. With the break of the Constitutionalist Revolution of 1932, Guimarães Rosa served as a volunteer doctor of the Public Force (Força Pública) heading to the so-called Tunel sector in Passa-Quatro, Minas Gerais, where he came into contact with the future president Juscelino Kubitschek, at that time the chief doctor of the Blood Hospital (Hospital de Sangue). Later on, he became a civil servant through examination. In 1933, he went to Barbacena in the position of Doctor of the 9th Infantry Battalion. Rosa later recalled that the experiences from his time as a doctor and a soldier were significant for his formation as a writer.

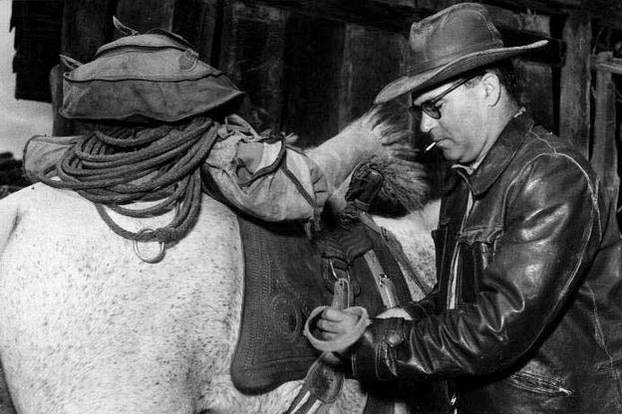
Guimarães Rosa during his 1952 travels through the sertão.

In the following year, Rosa began his diplomatic career. In 1938, he served as assistant consul in Hamburg, Germany, where he met his future second wife, Aracy de Carvalho Guimarães Rosa, the only Brazilian woman to be officially granted the title of Righteous among the nations for her assistance to Jews escaping the Third Reich.

In 1963, he was chosen by unanimous vote to enter the Brazilian Academy of Letters (Academia Brasileira de Letras) in his second candidacy. After postponing his acceptance for four years, he finally assumed his position in 1967, just three days before dying in the city of Rio de Janeiro, the victim of a heart attack, at the summit of his diplomatic and literary career.

== Work ==
=== Sagarana ===
Although Guimarães Rosa began to write with poetry, his only volume of verse, "Magma", was relinquished by the author and was only published posthumously. In turn, Rosa began pursuing a literary career by inscribing a collection of twelve short-novels in a contest, in 1938, whose jury was chaired by the then already prestigious Graciliano Ramos. The older writer denied him the first prize. Ramos himself later explained his devaluation of the first drafts of a work later known as Sagarana: in spite of the author's talent and the many beauties of the collection, he thought that the uneven quality of the stories and their often exaggeratedly long passages resulted in a work that was incoherent and immature. Guimarães Rosa extenuously reviewed his work, until finally considering it ready for publication only in 1946.

In its mature form, already noticeable in Sagarana, Rosa's style differs from that of Ramos. The latter's succinct, dry expression is in contrast with the former's detail and quality of language, rich in vocabulary and adventurous in its exploration of the grammar of the Portuguese language, qualities the Ramos himself would endow as his fellow writer's greatest virtues.

"Sagarana" is a portmanteau word crafted from the union of "saga" (homonym in Portuguese for saga) and "rana" (Tupi for "in the manner of"), thus translating as "(stories) in the manner of folk legends". The book is composed of nine short novels, three less than the original version submitted to the contest eight years earlier. All of these find their setting in the sertão and nearly all revolve around the figure of the jagunço, a mercenary-like figure that serves as a militia to farmers and secures the order in the Brazilian backlands. Rosa, however, would craft this outlaw manner of living to a type of existential condition according to which bravery and faith are the two driving forces of life. Antonio Candido related this treatment to a view of the jagunço that was inspired by the medieval knights and their values.

Rosa brings to his narratives the regional aspects of the sertão. His use of language closely follows the dialect of the sertanejos – inhabitants of the sertão–, employing regional terms and variations of words, as well as borrowing their traditions and customs. Furthermore, he takes advantage of the geography and the wildlife of the sertão to structure the stories. Vivid descriptions of landscapes (most notably in the short-novel São Marcos, "Saint Mark", where mystical lore of popular witchcraft and the vividness of nature are blended together) and animals, especially bird flocks and groups of cattle, populate the pages of the book, not only in an attempt to capture the backdrop of the geographic sertão, but also in close correspondence with the plot of the stories and as an extended metaphor for the solitude of man and his pursuit of transcendence. This is not, however, limited to the content of his stories. The noted narrative O Burrinho Pedrês ("The Brindled Donkey"), for example, contains anthological passages where Rosa intensely manipulates the sonority of the sentences, whether mimicking the metric of the traditional verse form of the popular songs of the sertão or employing onomatopoeia and alliteration and juxtaposing several words that relate to the field of cattle breeding to textually recreate the sounds of the passing herds. Rosa would sustain and develop these characteristics through his later work.

The most prestigious of these stories is the last, A Hora e Vez de Augusto Matraga ("The Time and Turn of Augusto Matraga"), referred to by Rosa as a sort of "key" to the collection The hagiography of a worldly man, recounts the redemption of a wealthy farm owner named Augusto Esteves, or Nhô Augusto, a vicious person likened to all sorts of debauchery, who is betrayed and beaten to nearly death, being finally left stranded in the deserted backlands and marked with a branding iron. Two old sertanejos rescue him and give him care in their house; during his convalescence, a priest administers blessings to him and promises the violated man that all persons are intended for a particular and decisive moment of salvation. Once cured, he proclaims his wish to go to heaven "nem que seja a porrete" ("even though by a cudgel"), and engages vigorously in farm work and good deeds and finds the companionship and friendliness of the jagunço leader Seu Joaõzinho Bem-Bem, who, reckoning the man's vocation to arms, invites him to his group, an offer which Nhô Augusto refuses in order to comply with his wish of ascending towards God.

Rosa later describes a scene where the splendour of nature is revealed to him through the bright colours of the flowers and the liberty of the birds. Affected by this revelation, Augusto departs to wander through the sertão in search of his "time and turn". His demand only finds completion through a fight to the death with the very leader of jagunços he once befriended. It is through a violent insurgence against what he sees as an unjust deed performed by the jagunços that Nhô Angusto ascends to a saint-like contention.

=== Corpo de Baile ===
Guimarães Rosa's next book was Corpo de Baile (roughly, "Corps de Ballet"), published ten years later, in 1956. For the second edition, the collection was divided into three parts, now usually published separately: Noites do Sertão ("Nights of the Sertão"); Manuelzão e Miguelim (a play on words with the names of two characters from the stories, using Portuguese augmentative and diminutive suffixes, translating reasonably as "Big Manuel and Little Miguel"); and, "No Urubuquaquá, no Pinhém" ("In the Urubuquaquá, in the Pinhém", the names being locations in the stories).

Such policy of publication, although authorized by the author himself, breaks the original structure of the book, whose complexity is often remarked on. The very name of the collection points to this fact: the "corps de ballet" it refers to is the conjunction of symbols and ideas that figure repeatedly across the seven short novels, reappearing here and there in this or that manner in order to gain yet another level of meaning. This "dancing" of motifs and metaphors takes place inside and outside of the stories. Among them, Rosa notably elects figures from astrology to compose and ordinate the plots and the relations between themselves, crafting a book-long sequence of a single meaning. Such progress is mimicked by the story Recado do Morro ("Message from the Hills"), which, accordingly, occupied the middle of the book, being the fourth story in the original publication.

Recado do Morro is also significant in its treatment of the idea of a language of the sertão itself. In the story, a group of five sertanejos is escorting a German naturalist on an expedition through the state of Minas Gerais. Parallel to their own discovery of the sertão, another journey is recounted, following step by step the march of the travellers: that of a message given by the very backlands that is spread unpretentiously, much in the manner of an anecdote, by the marginal members of the region's society. First heard from a hill by a madman who lives in the caves of the backlands, he recounts the message to his brother, an impoverished traveller, who, by his turns, tells the message to a child. /The child proceeds to tell the message to a travel guide, the guide to a prophetic hermit, who takes it to be a sign of the Revelation and lavishly repeats the message to a city's congregation; it is then heard by a neurotic man who, finally, recounts it to the poet and singer Laudelim. Each time the message is told, its conveyors slightly alter its contents, until the poet ultimately gives it the form of a mythical ballad, which he sings at a party attended by the expedition members. Only then it becomes clear that the message all along was a warning to their leader, Pedro Orósio.

Pedro, a handsome and virile man, is altogether hated for the relations he maintains with the wives of the other sertanejos. The men who he has fooled intend to have their revenge by letting him drunk and subsequently murdering him. Upon listening to the ballad, Pedro Orósio understands its hermetic symbolism to refer to himself and his pretentious men, which proves to be correct, and he is capable of saving his life after being warned by the "message of the hill".

One can see here an illustration by Guimarães Rosa of how he himself understood his writing. Rosa intervenes in the descriptions of the landscapes found by the German man's expedition with the successive versions of the story that the madmen, the child and finally the poet retell. Thus, he describes how a certain knowledge presented in nature is captured and mysteriously understood by those naïve or lunatic figures – something which is further established in Campo Geral – and becomes comprehensible through a poetic treatment, while accompanying a scientific discovery of the sertão, a discovery that is incapable of revealing the true secrecies it uncovers.

=== Grande Sertão: Veredas ===
Rosa published his masterpiece, Grande Sertão: Veredas (literally, "Great Backlands: Paths", but translated as The Devil to Pay in the Backlands, to Guimarães Rosa's disapproval) in the same year. His sole novel, the book began as yet another short novel that he continuously expanded and is written in the form of a monologue by the jagunço Riobaldo, who details his life to an educated listener, whose identity, while unknown, defines him as an urban man. Riobaldo mixes the wars of the jagunços, which form the most straightforward part of the novel's plot, with his musings on life, the existence of God and the Devil – his greatest concern –, the nature of human feelings and the passage of time and memory, as well as several short anecdotes, often allegories illustrating a point raised in his narrative.

The book can be seen, as it was by the author, as an adaptation of the faustian motif to the sertão. Riobaldo's account frequently returns to the central topic of his discourse, which he proclaims as the reason for his telling his life-story, as he expects, albeit ironically so, an answer from his listener: whether or not the Devil, and therefore evil, exists. Riobaldo is anguished by the idea he may have conducted a pact with the Devil, although he is uncertain, and he often dismisses the superstitions and beliefs of the "sertanejos" as stupidities. The interpretation of this supposed pact varies widely. Antonio Candido viewed it as an act of self-assurance, a symbolic deed by which Riobaldo can take hold of himself and of all his potential, something which allows him to become a powerful warrior who can extend vastly the power of his gang and avenge the betrayal of Joca Ramiro. In this, Candido insists, the pact is analogous to the initiation rites of the chivalric romances, through which the wan child becomes a worthy knight. Willi Bolle, on the other hand, in a materialistic view of the book, which he considers to demonstrate the formation of the social order in the sertão, sees the pact as an attempt by Riobaldo to socially ascend from his condition of a poor jagunço to the upper class of the rich farmers, an ascension which is the actual conclusion of the book.

All this is conducted by the motif of the star-crossed love affair. Riobaldo is torn between two contrasting loves: Diadorim, another jagunço, to whom he refers as a "demoniac love", and Otacília, an ordinary beauty from the backlands, a godly love for times of peace. He has the company of Diadorim for most of his life, though their love remains unconsummated, but unites with Otacília only once his days as a jagunço are over and behind.

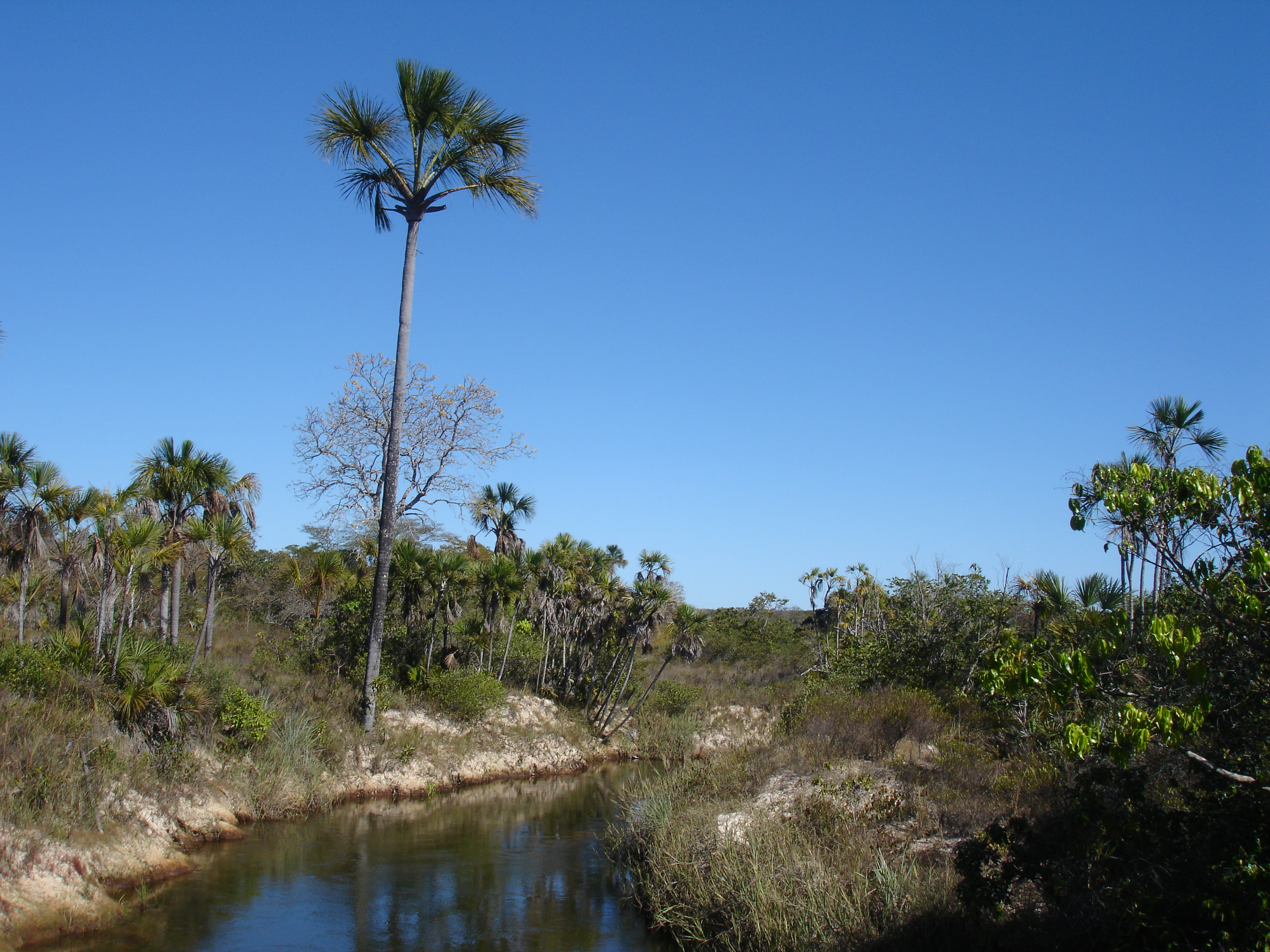
A vereda with a buriti tree at the Grande Sertão Veredas National Park in Brazil. The Park was created in 1989 in Formoso, Minas Gerais, in order to protect the environment

The matter of the Diadorim's identity is highly problematic. Though a woman, Diadorim passes off as a man, under the name of Reinaldo, to enter the male-exclusive world of the jagunços. Her true gender is only revealed to Riobaldo after her death. This points to a frequent theme of Riobaldo's musings: the inconstancy of things. According to Walnice Galvão, Riobaldo seems to reason that nothing ever is nor remains, but inside everything is its potential negation, which might easily suppress its anterior positive form. This fact is recounted several times by Riobaldo, often in sensorial metaphors, such as his description of poisonous rocks lying in the bottom of a clear river, or the stories he recounts of good men becoming vile and vile men becoming good. To her, the pact must be seen, in accordance with his perception, as an agreement with evil that results in great accomplishments and personal growth and a subsequent approximation towards God.

Furthermore, the novel might be seen as an attempt of memory, and therefore his speech, to retrieve that which has been irrevocably lost and attach personal meaning to it. Reality, therefore, becomes only a linguistic construction, made possible by the interaction of two persons. The novel closes with the sentence: "Travessia. O homem humano." ("Crossing. The human human-being.") followed by the symbol of infinity, a nod to the never-ending extension of life and its retelling.

=== Later works ===
Grande Sertão: Veredas was followed by Primeiras Estórias ("First Stories"), a collection of twenty-one short stories, published in 1962. Very famous among these is A Terceira Margem do Rio (lit., "The Third Bank of the River") made into a film of the same name and the inspiration behind a homonymous song by Caetano Veloso. The story, addressing the themes peculiar to Rosa's oeuvre and told in first person from the point of view of an observer, recounts the absurd event of a man who decides to live inside a boat in the middle of a water stream, giving no explanation for his actions nor achieving, apparently, anything with it.

His last collection published in life was Tutameia – Terceiras Estórias ("Tutameia – Third Stories"), "tuttameia" being a neologism that breaks up as "butterfly's skeleton", roughly meaning "ninharia", or "something of low value".

Two posthumous works followed: Estas Estórias ("These Stories"), another collection of short novels, and ‘’Ave, Palavra’’ (a pun on the double-meaning of the word "ave", which signifies both bird and an archaic salutation, being translated literally as "Bird, Word" or "Hail, Word"), a work of miscellany, compromising short stories, poems, journal entries and travel notations.

== Selected bibliography ==
- Caçador de camurças, Chronos Kai Anagke, O mistério de Highmore Hall e Makiné (1929)
- Magma (1936)
- Sagarana (1946)
- Com o Vaqueiro Mariano (With the cowboy Mariano, 1947)
- Corpo de Baile (1956)
- Grande Sertão: Veredas (The Devil to Pay in the Backlands) (1956)
- Primeiras Estórias (First Stories) (1962) (The story A Terceira Margem do Rio was later made into a movie of the same name)
- Tutaméia – Terceiras Estórias (1967)
- Em Memória de João Guimarães Rosa (1968, posthumous)
- Estas Estórias (1969, posthumous)
- Ave, Palavra (1970, posthumous)
- The Third Bank of the River and Other Stories (Translated to English by Barbara Shelby Merello, reprinted by Orbis Tertius Press, 2020)
