= Luz del Fuego (film) =

1982 film directed by David Neves

- Theatrical release poster
- Directed by: David Neves
- Written by: Joaquim Vaz de Carvalho
- Produced by: Carlos Moletta; Joaquim Vaz de Carvalho
- Starring: Lucélia Santos; Walmor Chagas
- Cinematography: Fernando Duarte
- Edited by: Martaluz
- Music by: Carlos Moletta
- Production companies: Riofilme; Morena Filmes; Sky Light Cinema
- Distributed by: Embrafilme
- Release date: April 5, 1982
- Running time: 102 minutes
- Country: Brazil
- Language: Portuguese

Luz del Fuego is a 1982 Brazilian drama film directed by David Neves and featuring Lucélia Santos in the lead role. The film is a liberal and romantic narrative of the controversial Brazilian vedette and activist Dora Vivacqua, better known by her stage name Luz del Fuego.

== Plot ==
Present day Guanabara Bay. Former senator João Gaspar (Walmor Chagas) is on his way to Ilha do Sol, the retreat of Luz del Fuego who was assassinated back in 1967. He tells his nurse about his days with Luz, how they met in the late 1940s and how she became his protégée in the following years.

== Cast ==
- Lucélia Santos: Dora Vivacqua
- Walmor Chagas: João Gaspar
- Joel Barcellos: Canário
- Ivan Cândido: Teodoro Dias
- Helber Rangel: Indalécio
- Marco Soares: Agildo
- Ítala Nandi: Isabel Gaspar

== Production ==
Co-produced by Riofilme, Morena Filmes, and Sky Light Cinema, Luz del Fuelgo was shot between May and July 1981 in Ilha dos Lobos, Torres, Rio Grande do Sul.

== Reception ==
Luz del Fuego was the winner of awards Best Actress, Best Actor, Best Photography, and Best Scenography at the 1982 Festival de Gramado.
