= Hunger for Love =

1968 film

- Directed by: Nelson Pereira dos Santos
- Written by: Nelson Pereira dos Santos; Guilherme Figueiredo; Luis Carlos Ripper
- Produced by: Antônio Cristiano; Paulo Porto
- Starring: Arduíno Colassanti
- Cinematography: Dib Lutfi
- Edited by: Lucia Erita
- Release date: June 1968
- Running time: 73 minutes
- Country: Brazil
- Language: Portuguese

Hunger for Love (Portuguese: Fome de Amor) is a 1968 Brazilian drama film directed by Nelson Pereira dos Santos. It was entered into the 18th Berlin International Film Festival.

== Cast ==
- Arduíno Colassanti - Felipe
- Leila Diniz - Ulla
- Paulo Porto - Alfredo
