= How Tasty Was My Little Frenchman =

1971 film directed by Nelson Pereira dos Santos

Como Era Gostoso o Meu Francês
- Directed by: Nelson Pereira dos Santos
- Written by: Humberto Mauro (Tupi dialogues) and Nelson Pereira dos Santos
- Produced by: Luiz Carlos Barreto, K.M. Eckstein, Nelson Pereira dos Santos, César Thedim
- Starring: Arduíno Colassanti; Ana Maria Magalhães; Eduardo Imbassahy Filho; Manfredo Colassanti; José Kléber; Gabriel Archanjo
- Cinematography: Dib Lutfi
- Edited by: Carlos Alberto Camuyrano
- Music by: Guilherme Magalhães Vaz and José Rodrix
- Distributed by: Condor Filmes
- Release date: 1971
- Running time: 84 minutes
- Country: Brazil
- Languages: Portuguese, Tupi, French

How Tasty Was My Little Frenchman (Portuguese: Como Era Gostoso o Meu Francês) is a Brazilian black comedy directed and co-written by Nelson Pereira dos Santos released in 1971.

Almost all of the dialogue in the film was written in the Tupi language. The actors and actresses who portrayed the Tupinambas wore historically correct attire, resulting in a considerable amount of historically correct nudity and semi-nudity in many scenes.

The location for the entire film was the Bay of Ilha Grande, which has 365 islands and whose shores comprise the Angra dos Reis and Parati municipalities in the state of Rio de Janeiro.

== Plot ==
In 16th century Brazil rival French and Portuguese settlers are utilizing the indigenous people as allies in their struggle to establish control. The Tupinambás, who live in the Guanabara Bay area, are allied with the French, while the Tupiniquins are allied with the Portuguese.

A Frenchman who has been captured by the Portuguese is then captured by the Tupinambás after they attack and kill a group of Portuguese. He tries to convince his captors by speaking in French (reciting the poem by Étienne Jodelle found in André Thévet's Singularities of France Antarctique) but the Tupinambás do not believe that the Frenchman was a prisoner of the Portuguese they have killed, and the chief thinks he is Portuguese because "No Frenchman would shoot at the Tupinambá." The tribe's shaman predicted they would find a strong Portuguese man to cannibalize as revenge for the chief's brother being killed by a Portuguese musket ball. Now they have one.

However, the Frenchman is allowed free run of the village area, is eventually provided with a "wife," and adopts traditional Tupinambá nudity in place of his Western clothes.

A French tradesman comes to the village and tells the Tupinambás that their prisoner is indeed Portuguese – he then promises the outraged Frenchman that he will tell the Tupinambás the truth if the Frenchman finds a hidden treasure that another European has hidden in the area. He also instructs him to collect wood, and pepper for him on his return.

The Frenchman gathers cannon powder from the abandoned Portuguese cannons, and brings it to the Tupinambás, who use it to defeat the rival Tupiniquins in battle.

The relationship between the Frenchman and his Tupinambá "wife" remains enigmatic. It is unclear for most of the movie if she intends to save him from the group that wants to eat him, or if she has been assigned to win his trust and prevent him from escaping. The Frenchman appears to become in love with her but eventually decides to try to leave. She keeps him from escaping by swamping his canoe and then shooting him in the leg with an arrow. He is then taken to meet his fate of being ritually killed and eaten.

In the last seconds of his life, the Frenchman refuses to play along with the ceremonial script that the Tupinambás expect him to follow and instead angrily (and loudly) tells the Tupinambás that his death will not revitalize them (as his death and the subsequent cannibal feast is intended to do) but rather will doom them all to extermination.

The movie ends with a postscript that reveals the rival Tupiniquim were later exterminated by their supposed allies, the Portuguese.

== Cast ==
- Arduíno Colassanti - The Frenchman
- Ana Maria Magalhães - Seboipepe
- Eduardo Imbassahy Filho - Cunhambebe
- Manfredo Colassanti - The tradesman
- José Kléber - Ipiraguaçu
- Gabriel Archanjo - Mbiratata

== Reception ==
=== Awards and nominations ===
The film was selected as the Brazilian entry for the Best Foreign Language Film at the 45th Academy Awards, but was not accepted as a nominee.

1971 Festival de Brasília

- Best Screenplay (Nelson Pereira dos Santos)
- Best Dialog (Nelson Pereira dos Santos and Humberto Mauro)
- Best Cenograph (Régis Monteiro)

Berlin Film Festival

- Golden Bear (nominated)

1973 São Paulo Association of Art Critics Awards

- Most Promising Actress (Ana Maria Magalhães)

== See also ==
- List of submissions to the 45th Academy Awards for Best Foreign Language Film
- List of Brazilian submissions for the Academy Award for Best Foreign Language Film
- Human cannibalism
