= Barren Lives (film) =

1963 film directed by Nelson Pereira dos Santos

- Theatrical release poster
- Portuguese: Vidas Secas
- Directed by: Nelson Pereira dos Santos
- Written by: Nelson Pereira dos Santos
- Produced by: Luiz Carlos Barreto; Herbert Richers; Danilo Trelles
- Starring: Átila Iório; Maria Ribeiro
- Cinematography: Luiz Carlos Barreto
- Edited by: Rafael Justo Valverde
- Music by: Leonardo Alencar
- Production company: Herbert Richers
- Distributed by: Herbert Richers; Sinofilmes
- Release date: 22 August 1963 (Brazil)
- Running time: 100 minutes
- Country: Brazil
- Language: Portuguese

Barren Lives (Vidas secas, (Portuguese pronunciation: [ˈvidɐs ˈsekɐs], meaning "Dry Lives"; Pre-Reform spelling: Vidas sêcas) is a 1963 Brazilian drama film directed by Nelson Pereira dos Santos, and based on the 1938 novel of the same name by Graciliano Ramos. It tells the story of a poverty-stricken family in the dry Brazilian northeast.

The film stars Átila Iório, Orlando Macedo, Maria Ribeiro and Joffre Soares. It is one of the key films in the Brazilian Cinema Novo movement. It was entered into the 1964 Cannes Film Festival.

== Synopsis ==
1940s. A poor peasant family from the Northeast flees drought and famine. The family is made up of a mother, father and two young sons. After a tiring walk through the sertão, they reach the dilapidated house of Tomas, a friend who has gone to try his luck in other regions. The walk to get to Tomas was very long. The dog ensures the children do not fall behind, and at one point, the father must carry the eldest son due to exhaustion. Fabiano, the head of the family, is hired as a cowherd by the fazenda owner who employs Tomas. Life is not easy and Fabiano is indebted to his boss. One Sunday, before a folklore festival, Fabiano is provoked to play cards by a police officer. Although he wins, he gets beaten and dragged to prison. Released, he goes back to work. The mother is angry that he spent all of their money on alcohol and gambling. She dreams of sleeping on a leather bed. With the drought raging once more, the family prepares to set out again, desperately looking for fertile land. The father goes out into a field to kill the dog before they leave. The end of the film is a long take of them walking into the barren desert.

The bright sun is a common theme throughout the film. On their journeys to look for a better future, the sun makes it very hard to continue walking. The sun also dries up all of the water and water represents life. Without it everything dies.

== Cast ==
- Átila Iório – Fabiano
- Maria Ribeiro – Sinhá Vitória (Mother)
- Orlando Macedo – Soldado Amarelo (Soldier)
- Joffre Soares – Fazendeiro (Farmer)
- Gilvan Lima – Boy (as Gilvan)
- Genivaldo Lima – Boy (as Genivaldo)
