= Walter Lima Jr. =

Brazilian film director

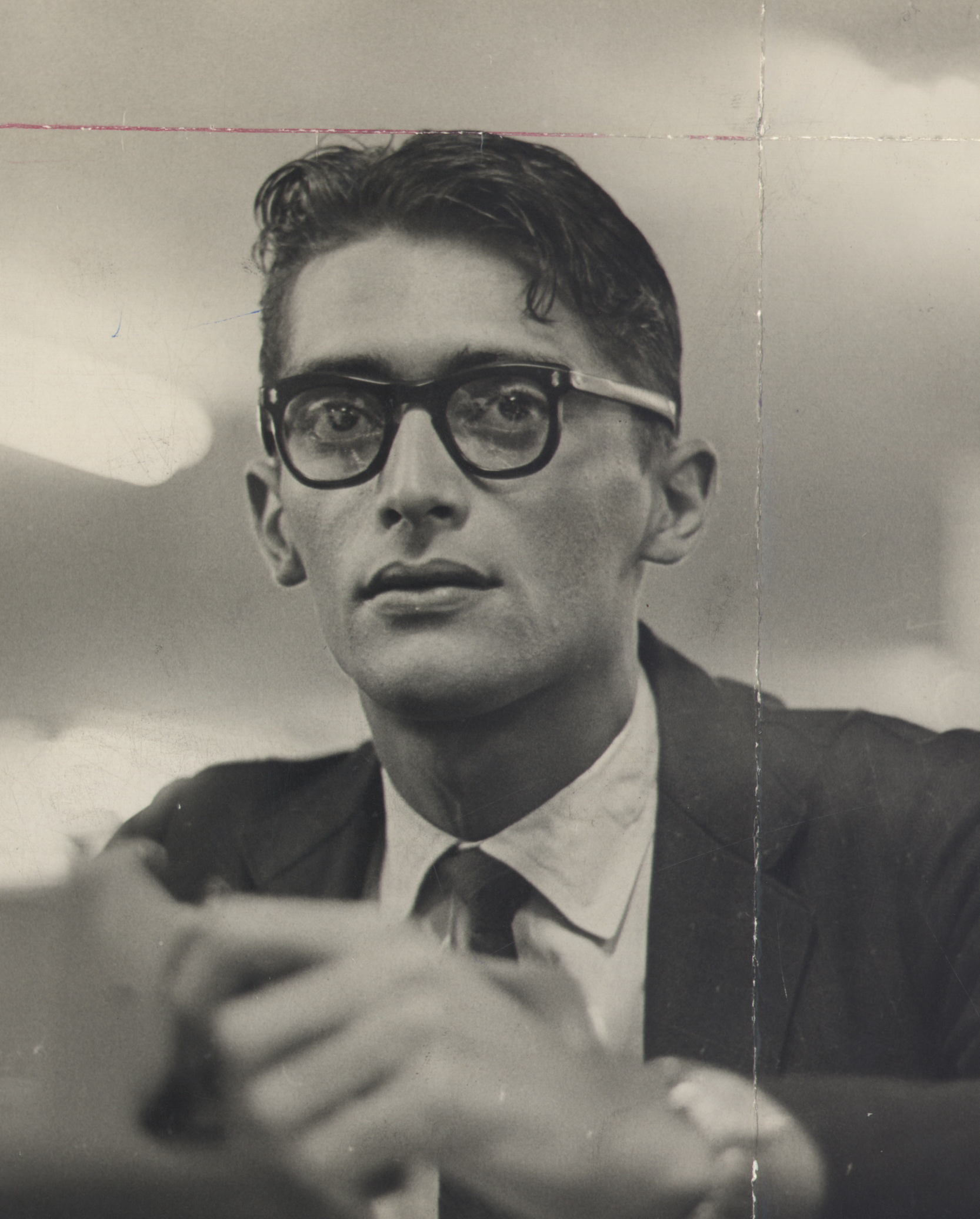
- Walter Lima Junior in 1972
- Born: 26 November 1938 (age 87); Rio de Janeiro, Brazil
- Occupations: Film director Screenwriter
- Years active: 1965–present

Walter Lima Jr. (born 26 November 1938) is a Brazilian film director and screenwriter. He has directed 17 films since 1965. His 1969 film Brazil Year 2000 was entered into the 19th Berlin International Film Festival, where it won a Silver Bear.

== Selected filmography ==
- Black God, White Devil (1964 – writer)
- Brazil Year 2000 (1969)
- The Lyre of Delight (1978)
- Inocencia (1983)
- The Oyster and the Wind (1997)
