= Paulo César Pereio =

Brazilian actor (1940–2024)

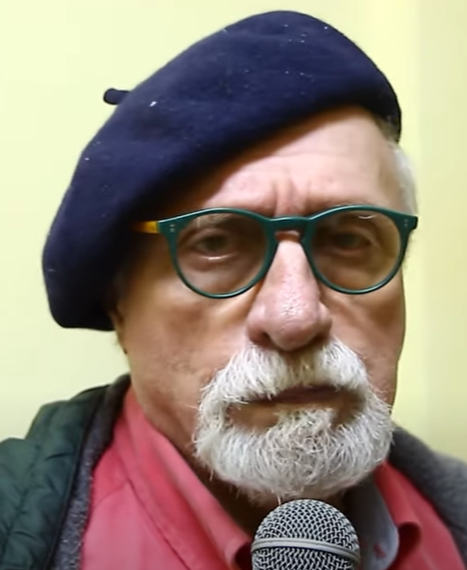
- Pereio in 2015
- Born: Paulo César de Campos Velho; 19 October 1940; Alegrete, Rio Grande do Sul, Brazil
- Died: 12 May 2024 (aged 83); Rio de Janeiro, Brazil
- Occupation: Actor
- Years active: 1956–2024

Paulo César de Campos Velho, better known as Paulo César Pereio (19 October 1940 – 12 May 2024), was a Brazilian actor.

== Activism ==
Pereio was known for being an ardent atheist and communist who was heavily opposed to the statue of Christ the Redeemer, stating that it violates Brazil's secular constitution and ruins the beauty of the mountain. From the late 20th century he gathered signatures for its removal.

== Death ==
Pereio died on 12 May 2024, at the age of 83.

== Selected filmography ==
- Os Fuzis (1964)
- The Brave Warrior (1968)
- Iracema: Uma Transa Amazônica (1974)
- A Queda (1976)
- Lucio Flavio (1977)
- Tudo Bem (1978)
- Eu Te Amo (1981)
- Better Days Ahead (1989)
- Magnifica 70 (2015–2016)
