= Anecy Rocha =

Brazilian actress (1942–1977)

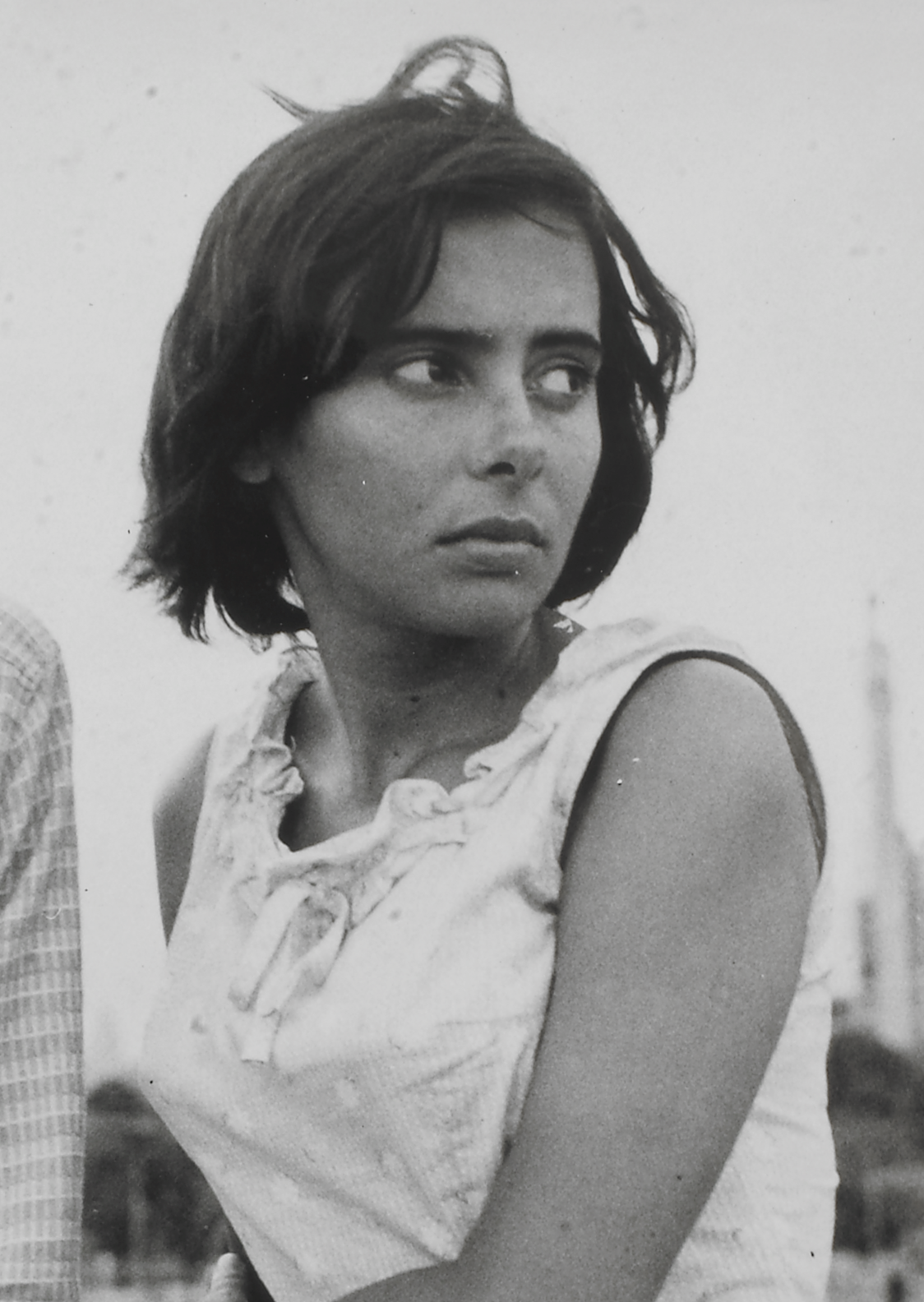
- Born: Anecyr de Andrade Rocha; 26 October 1942; Vitória da Conquista, Bahia, Brazil
- Died: 26 March 1977 (aged 34)
- Occupation: Actress
- Relatives: Glauber Rocha (brother)

Anecyr de Andrade Rocha (26 October 1942 – 26 March 1977) was a Brazilian actress.

On 26 October 1942, Anecy Rocha was born in Vitória da Conquista, Bahia, Brazil. Her brother, Glauber Rocha, was a film director. She died on 26 March 1977, following a fatal fall into an elevator ditch of her Rio de Janeiro apartment, which she shared with her husband, director Walter Lima Jr.

== Film credits ==
Year	Title	Role	Citation(s)
1966	The Big City	Luzia	
1970	Mortal Sin	Anecy	
1974	The Amulet of Ogum	Eneida	
1977	Tent of Miracles	Dr. Edelweiss	
