= Nelson Pereira dos Santos =

Brazilian film director (1928–2018)

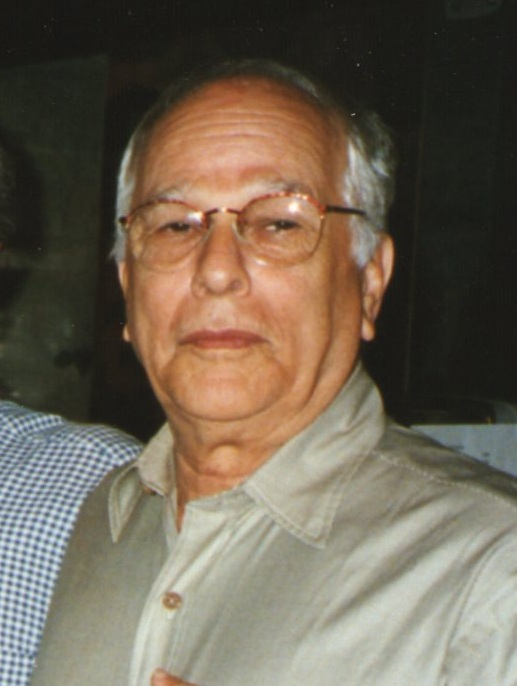
- Born: 22 October 1928; São Paulo, São Paulo, Brazil
- Died: 21 April 2018 (aged 89); Rio de Janeiro, Rio de Janeiro, Brazil
- Occupation: Film director
- Years active: 1955–2018
- Movement: Cinema Novo
- Spouse(s): Laurita Andrade Sant'Anna dos Santos (1949-1999); Ivelise Ferreira (2000-2018)

Nelson Pereira dos Santos (22 October 1928 – 21 April 2018) was a Brazilian film director. He directed films such as Vidas Secas (Barren Lives, 1963), based on the book with the same name by Brazilian writer Graciliano Ramos, Rio, 40º Graus, and his most well-known film outside of Brazil is the black comedy How Tasty Was My Little Frenchman (1971).

== Biography ==
Pereira dos Santos, named in honor of Horatio Nelson, was born in São Paulo, Brazil. Himself a frequenter of the cinema, Pereira dos Santos's father brought his very young son to the movie theater for the first time. By secondary school Pereira dos Santos was already fond of literature, and at 15 years old he joined the Brazilian Communist Party and became close to one of its other members, Astrogildo Pereira. At the time the party was considered illegal by the government of Getúlio Vargas.

The first feature film he directed was Rio 40 Graus, which was released in 1955. The film is a chronicle of life in the favelas of Rio de Janeiro, and it influenced several other directors, spurring the Cinema Novo movement. In 1963, Pereira dos Santos was a member of the jury at the 3rd Moscow International Film Festival. In 1981 he was a member of the jury at the 12th Moscow International Film Festival.

His most well-known film outside Brazil is Como Era Gostoso o Meu Francês (How Tasty Was My Little Frenchman, 1971). It was entered into the 21st Berlin International Film Festival. The film takes place in the sixteenth century and details the alleged cannibalistic practices of the (now extinct) indigenous Tupinamba warrior tribe against the French and Portuguese colonizers of the Brazilian littoral. The film is something of a black comedy about European colonialism—one that makes satirical use of the Brazilian modernist trope of Antropofagia ("cultural cannibalism"), then recently revived by the Tropicalismo movement of the 1960s—as well as a bitter commentary on the historical genocide of the indigenous tribes in Latin America and the gradual destruction of their civilization.

His 1994 film The Third Bank of the River was entered into the 44th Berlin International Film Festival.

Pereira dos Santos' 2006 film Brasília 18% explores some of the darker aspects of contemporary Brazilian politics such as political corruption, the murder of trial witnesses, and money laundering.

Pereira dos Santos was a member of the Brazilian Academy of Letters since 2006.

== Death ==
Pereira dos Santos died of multiple organ failure in Rio de Janeiro on 12 April 2018. He was 89.

== Selected filmography ==
- Juventude (1949; short film)
- Rio 40 Graus (1955)
- Rio Zona Norte (1957)
- Mandacaru Vermelho (1961)
- El justicero (1963)
- Barren Lives (1963)
- The Golden Mouth (1963)
- Hunger for Love (1968)
- The Alienist (1970)
- How Tasty Was My Little Frenchman (1971)
- Quem é Beta? (1972)
- The Amulet of Ogum (1974)
- Tenda dos Milagres (1977)
- A Missa do Galo (1980; short film)
- The Highway of Life (1983)
- Memórias do Cárcere (1984)
- Jubiabá (1986)
- The Third Bank of the River (1994)
- Cinema of Tears (Cinema de Lágrimas) (1995)
- Casa-Grande e Senzala (2000; TV film)
- Raízes do Brasil (2003)
- Meu Compadre, Zé Ketti (2003; short film)
- Brasília 18% (2006)
- The Music According to Antonio Carlos Jobim (2012)
- A Luz do Tom (2013)

== Bibliography ==
- Darlene J. Sadlier: Nelson Pereira dos Santos (Contemporary Film Directors), University of Illinois Press, 2003, ISBN 0-252-07112-3

Preceded by Sérgio Correia da Costa	Brazilian Academy of Letters - Occupant of the 7th chair 2006 — 2018	Succeeded by Cacá Diegues
