= Splash! =

Splash! may refer to:

- Splash! (academic outreach program)
- "Splash!" (song), a 2006 song by B'z
- Splash! (festival), a hip hop and reggae festival in Germany
- Reality television series based on the Celebrity Splash! franchise
  - Splash! (Chinese TV series), the official English title of a Chinese reality series
  - Splash (South Korean TV series), a short-lived South Korean reality series
  - Splash! (British TV series), a British reality TV series
  - Splash (American TV series), an American reality series

== See also ==
- Splash (disambiguation)
