= Splash =

Splash or Splash! or The Splash may refer to:

== Common meanings ==
- Splash (fluid mechanics), sudden disturbances on the surface of water

== Entertainment ==
- Splash (film), a 1984 fantasy film starring Tom Hanks and Daryl Hannah
- Reality television series based on the Celebrity Splash! franchise
  - Splash (American TV series), an American reality series
  - Splash! (Chinese TV series), the official English title of a Chinese reality series
  - Splash (South Korean TV series), a short-lived South Korean reality television series
  - Splash! (British TV series), a British reality television series
- Splash, the main character in the PBS Kids show Splash and Bubbles

== Music ==
=== Artists ===
- Splash (German band)
- Splash (Japanese band)
- Splash (South African band)
- Jack Splash, American record producer

=== Albums ===
- Splash (Flow album) (2003)
- Splash (Freddie Hubbard album) (1981)
- Splash (Jeremy Jay album) (2009)
- Splash (Satomi Fukunaga album) (1986)
- Splash (Sonia & Disappear Fear album) (2009)
- Splashes (album), by Archie Shepp's Quartet (1987)

=== Songs ===
- "Splash!" (B'z song), 2006
- "Splash" (Sub Focus song), 2010
- "Splash" (Yesung song), 2017
- "Splash" (Colapesce & Dimartino song), 2023
- "Splash", by Can, 1974
- "Splash", by Chon from Grow, 2015
- "Splash", by Doug Wimbish from the album Trippy Notes for Bass, 1999
- "Splash", by Gwen Stefani from the album This Is What the Truth Feels Like, 2016
- "Splash", by Ho99o9 from the album United States of Horror, 2017
- "Splash", by John Legend, Jhené Aiko and Ty Dolla Sign from the album Legend, 2022
- "Splash", by Keziah Jones from the album African Space Craft, 1995
- "Splash", by Miles Davis from the album Circle in the Round, 1979
- "Splash", by Modern Eon, B-side of Mechanic, 1981
- "Splash", by SiAngie Twins featuring DreamDoll, 2020

=== Other ===
- Splash! (festival), a hip hop and reggae festival in Germany
- Splash cymbal, a small cymbal used as part of a drum kit

== Businesses ==
- Splash (fashion), the Middle East's largest fashion retailer
- Splash 105.5 FM Ibadan, a Nigerian radio station
- Splash Corporation, a Filipino personal care and food company
- Splash Entertainment, an animation studio that produces children's TV series
- Splash FM, former name of More Radio Worthing, a UK radio station
- Splash News, an entertainment news and photography agency

== Transportation ==
- Suzuki Splash, an automobile
- Rinspeed Splash, a car that becomes a hydrofoil boat
- Splash (dinghy), a boat

== Sports teams ==
- Anaheim Splash, a short-lived U.S. soccer team
- Asheville Splash, a defunct minor league women's soccer franchise

== Other uses ==
- Splash (academic outreach program), an academic outreach program by MIT
- SPLASH (conference), a computer science conference held by the SIGPLAN special interest group of the ACM
- Splash (website), an event management website
- V8 (beverage) Splash, a blend of fruit and vegetable juices
- The Splash, a statue by Peter Hodgkinson
- Splash (c. 1986 – 2005) – see List of captive orcas
- Splash, a Portuguese water dog owned by Ted Kennedy
- Splash (otter), an otter trained in search and rescue
- Splash (wrestling), a professional wrestling technique
- SPLASH, a summer school activity club in Wiltshire run by Wiltshire Police
- The Splash, a 1966 painting by British artist David Hockney
- Splash, an alternative name for a depth charge

== See also ==
- Last Splash, by The Breeders (1993)
- Splash! (disambiguation)
