= Yanna Lavigne =

Brazilian television actress and model (born 1989)

- Born: Yanna Lavigne Inagaki; 29 November 1989 (age 36); Osasco, São Paulo, Brazil
- Occupations: Actress, model
- Years active: 2005–present (model); 2010–present (actress)
- Height: 1.65 m (5 ft 5 in)
- Spouse: Bruno Gissoni (m. 2018)
- Children: 2

Yanna Lavigne Inagaki Gissoni (born 29 November 1989) is a Brazilian television actress and model.

== Biography ==
Born in Osasco, she is the daughter of a Japanese man and a woman from Bahia state. Due to her exotic looks, her school colleagues in Nagoya suggested to her that she competes in the Aichi province's local beauty contest in 2006. After she was discovered by a Brazilian scout, she worked as a model in Tokyo. She returned to Brazil when she was 19 years old and studied at Rede Globo's actors school.

She is of Japanese, French and Spanish descent.

== Career ==
Her television debut was in the Fantástico's sketch named “O Cupido”, in 2010, and in 2011 she guest starred in several episodes of the telenovela Malhação. The actress played a promiscuous girl in the 2012 telenovela Avenida Brasil. Yanna Lavigne was part of the main cast of the 2013 telenovela Salve Jorge as a Turkish woman named Tamar. She played Ana Fátima, who was one of the protagonists, in the 2013 telenovela Além do Horizonte. Yanna Lavigne played a victim of a homicide in the 2014 police TV series Dupla Identidade, by Glória Perez. She guest starred in the 2015 telenovela Babilônia as Susana, who is the mistress of the dishonest mayor Aderbal, played by Marcos Palmeira.

=== Saltibum ===
Yanna Lavigne competed in the 2015 edition of the Rede Globo's Saltibum reality show, which is a segment of the Caldeirão do Huck program and it is the Brazilian version of the Dutch reality TV show Celebrity Splash!.

== Television ==
Telenovelas
Year	Title	Role	Notes	Ref.
2010	Fantástico	Mariana Matos	Sketch: O Cupido	
2011	Malhação	Laís	Recurring role	
2012	Avenida Brasil	Promiscuous girl	Special guest star	
2013	Salve Jorge	Tamar	Co-protagonist	
2013	Além do Horizonte	Ana Fátima Andrade Martins	Co-protagonist	
2014	Dupla Identidade	Mariana	Special guest star	
2015	Saltibum	Herself	Reality competition	
2015	Babilônia	Susana Mendonça	Guest star	
2016	Ligações Perigosas	Júlia	Recurring role	
2016	Liberdade, Liberdade	Mirtes Aparecida Anunciação (Mimi)	Recurring role	

== Awards and nominations ==
Awards and nominations
Year	Award	Category	Work	Result
2013	Prêmio Contigo!	Best TV Newcomer	Tamar in Salve Jorge	Nominated
