= Saltibum =

- Genre: Reality
- Presented by: Luciano Huck
- Judges: Eduardo Falcão (2014–present); Hugo Parisi (2014); Roberto Biagioni (2015–present)
- Country of origin: Brazil
- No. of seasons: 3
- No. of episodes: 31

Production
- Production locations: CEFAN, Rio de Janeiro
- Production company: Eyeworks

Original release
- Network: Rede Globo
- Release: April 5, 2014 – December 17, 2016

Related
- Celebrity Splash!

Saltibum is a Brazilian reality competition series broadcast on Rede Globo, based on the Celebrity Splash! format created by Dutch company Eyeworks.

The name Saltibum is a portmanteau of the words Salto (Jump in Portuguese) and Tibum (a Portuguese onomatopoeia for Splash).

The series premiered on April 5, 2014, airing as a one-hour segment during Caldeirão do Huck, hosted by Luciano Huck.

BASC supervisor and BOC member Eduardo Falcão and Olympic athlete Hugo Parisi were judges while Roberto Gonçalves, Andrea Boehme, Cassius Duran and Juliana Veloso mentored the competitors.

On May 22, 2014, Rede Globo renewed the show for a second season.

== Format ==
In the show, 12–14 celebrities compete against each other performing dives from extreme heights in order to impress a judging panel.

Filming began on February 13, 2014 at the Brazil's Navy Almirante Adalberto Nunes Physical Education Center (a.k.a. CEFAN), Rio de Janeiro.

=== Season chronology ===
Season	Winner(s)		Runner(s)-up		Judges	Ref.
1	Rômulo Neto		Camilla Camargo		Eduardo Falcão; Hugo Parisi	
2	Priscila Fantin	Rodrigo Simas	Thaeme	Jacaré	Eduardo Falcão; Roberto Biagioni	
3	Maíra Charken	Bruno Chateaubriand	Scheila Carvalho	Diogo Sales	Eduardo Falcão; Roberto Biagioni	
