= Saltibum season 3 =

Saltibum
- Season 3
- Winners: Maíra Charken & Bruno Chateaubriand
- No. of episodes: 11

Release
- Original network: Rede Globo
- Original release: October 8 – December 17, 2016

Season chronology
- ← Previous; Season 2

The third season of Saltibum premiered on October 8, 2016, at 5:30 p.m. (BRT/AMT) on Rede Globo. Luciano Huck returned to host, alongside resident judges Eduardo Falcão and Roberto Biagioni. This season will have two winners (one male and one female), as it was the previous season.

== Contestants ==
Celebrity	Known for	Status
Naldo Benny	Singer	Eliminated 1st on October 22, 2016
Carol Barcellos	Sportscaster	Eliminated 2nd on October 29, 2016
Raphael Sander (Returned on December 3)	Actor	Eliminated 3rd on November 5, 2016
Talytha Pugliesi	Model	Eliminated 4th on November 12, 2016
Kayky Brito (Returned on December 3)	Actor	Eliminated 5th on November 19, 2016
Bella Falconi (Returned on December 3)	Fitness blogger	Eliminated 6th on November 26, 2016
Mariano	Singer	Withdrew on December 3, 2016
Bella Falconi	Fitness blogger	Eliminated 7th on December 10, 2016
Lexa	Singer	Eliminated 8th on December 10, 2016
Raphael Sander	Actor	Eliminated 9th on December 10, 2016
Kayky Brito	Actor	Eliminated 10th on December 10, 2016
Pedro Scooby	Professional surfer	Third place on December 17, 2016
Marcela Fetter	Actress	Third place on December 17, 2016
Diogo Sales	Game of Thrones actor	Runner-up on December 17, 2016
Scheila Carvalho	Dancer	Runner-up on December 17, 2016
Bruno Chateaubriand	Businessman	Winner on December 17, 2016
Maíra Charken	Actress & TV host	Winner on December 17, 2016

== Scoring chart ==
Contestant	Place	Wk 1	Wk 2	Wk 3	Wk 4	Wk 5	Wk 6	Wk 7	Wk 8	Wk 9	Wk 10	Wk 11
Maíra Charken	1	28.5	—	—	28.6	—	29.1	—	29.4	—	28.8	117.4
Bruno Chateaubriand	1	—	29.2	30.0	—	30.0	—	29.9	—	—	30.0	117.3
Scheila Carvalho	2	26.3	—	—	29.5	—	30.0	—	29.2	—	29.3	111.7
Diogo Sales	2	26.2	—	29.2	—	28.9	—	29.2	—	—	28.3	112.1
Marcela Fetter	3	—	23.9	—	28.7	—	26.5	—	27.3	—	25.5	108.8
Pedro Scooby	3	28.4	—	29.2	—	30.0	—	29.3	—	—	28.9	111.8
Kayky Brito	7	25.2	—	28.8	—	28.5	—	28.7		28.5	28.2	
Raphael Sander	8	—	22.3	26.6	—	26.7				25.9	25.4	
Lexa	9	—	22.6	—	29.1	—	27.5	—	27.6	—	25.2	
Bella Falconi	10	22.8	—	—	28.5	—	27.1	—	23.6	26.3	22.7	
Mariano	11	—	28.0	28.7	—	29.1	—	29.9	—	WD		
Talytha Pugliesi	12	—	23.4	—	25.5	—	24.0			21.5		
Carol Barcellos	13	—	21.4	—	26.8					23.3		
Naldo Benny	14	22.7	—	22.2						21.9		

Key

Lowest score	Highest score	Eliminated	Bottom two	Dive-off
Lowest score	Highest score	Third place	Runner-up	Winners

== Show details ==
=== Week 1 ===
Round 1 – Men & Women (Day 1)

- Celebrity guest: Tadeu Schmidt

Running order

3 metre springboard
Episode 1 (October 8)	Contestant	Scores			Dive points	Result (Total points)
Episode 1 (October 8)	Contestant	Guest	Falcão	Biagioni	Dive points	Result (Total points)
Episode 1 (October 8)	Women					
Episode 1 (October 8)	Scheila Carvalho	9.0	8.7	8.6	26.3	2nd (26.3)
Episode 1 (October 8)	Bella Falconi	8.3	7.2	7.3	22.8	5th (22.8)
Episode 1 (October 8)	Maíra Charken	9.8	9.3	9.4	28.5	1st (28.5)
Episode 1 (October 8)	Men					
Episode 1 (October 8)	Kayky Brito	9.0	8.1	8.1	25.2	5th (25.2)
Episode 1 (October 8)	Diogo Sales	9.0	8.5	8.7	26.2	4th (26.2)
Episode 1 (October 8)	Naldo Benny	8.6	7.0	7.1	22.7	6th (22.7)
Episode 1 (October 8)	Pedro Scooby	9.8	9.3	9.3	28.4	2nd (28.4)

=== Week 2 ===
Round 1 – Men & Women (Day 2)

- Celebrity guest: Ísis Valverde

Running order

3 metre springboard
Episode 2 (October 15)	Contestant	Scores			Dive points	Result (Total points)
Episode 2 (October 15)	Contestant	Guest	Falcão	Biagioni	Dive points	Result (Total points)
Episode 2 (October 15)	Women					
Episode 2 (October 15)	Lexa	8.0	7.3	7.3	22.6	6th (22.6)
Episode 2 (October 15)	Talytha Pugliesi	8.4	7.5	7.5	23.4	4th (23.4)
Episode 2 (October 15)	Carol Barcellos	7.3	7.1	7.0	21.4	7th (21.4)
Episode 2 (October 15)	Marcela Fetter	8.5	7.6	7.8	23.9	3rd (23.9)
Episode 2 (October 15)	Men					
Episode 2 (October 15)	Mariano	9.7	9.2	9.1	28.0	2rd (28.0)
Episode 2 (October 15)	Raphael Sander	7.7	7.4	7.2	22.3	7th (22.3)
Episode 2 (October 15)	Bruno Chateaubriand	10	9.5	9.7	29.2	1st (29.2)

=== Week 3 ===
Round 2 – Men

- Celebrity guest: Felipe Titto

Running order

5 metre platform
Episode 3 (October 22)	Contestant	Scores			Dive points	Result (Total points)
Episode 3 (October 22)	Contestant	Guest	Falcão	Biagioni	Dive points	Result (Total points)
Episode 3 (October 22)	Mariano	9.5	9.7	9.5	28.7	3rd (56.7)
Episode 3 (October 22)	Raphael Sander	9.0	8.7	8.5	26.6	6th (48.5)
Episode 3 (October 22)	Naldo Benny	8.0	7.0	7.2	22.2	7th (44.9)
Episode 3 (October 22)	Kayky Brito	10	9.5	9.3	28.8	5th (54.0)
Episode 3 (October 22)	Diogo Sales	10	9.5	9.7	29.2	4th (55.4)
Episode 3 (October 22)	Pedro Scooby	10	9.5	9.7	29.2	2nd (57.6)
Episode 3 (October 22)	Bruno Chateaubriand	10	10	10	30.0	1st (59.2)

=== Week 4 ===
Round 2 – Women

- Celebrity guest: Priscila Fantin

Running order

5 metre platform
Episode 4 (October 29)	Contestant	Scores			Dive points	Result (Total points)
Episode 4 (October 29)	Contestant	Guest	Falcão	Biagioni	Dive points	Result (Total points)
Episode 4 (October 29)	Carol Barcellos	9.8	8.3	8.7	26.8	7th (48.2)
Episode 4 (October 29)	Lexa	10	9.5	9.6	29.1	4th (51.7)
Episode 4 (October 29)	Bella Falconi	10	9.3	9.2	28.5	5th (51.3)
Episode 4 (October 29)	Talytha Pugliesi	9.5	8.0	8.0	25.5	6th (48.9)
Episode 4 (October 29)	Marcela Fetter	10	9.2	9.5	28.7	3rd (52.6)
Episode 4 (October 29)	Scheila Carvalho	10	9.7	9.8	29.5	2nd (55.8)
Episode 4 (October 29)	Maíra Charken	10	9.2	9.4	28.6	1st (57.1)

=== Week 5 ===
Round 3 – Men

- Celebrity guest: Daniel Dias

Running order

5 metre platform synchronized
Episode 5 (November 5)	Contestant (Professional partner)	Scores			Dive points	Result
Episode 5 (November 5)	Contestant (Professional partner)	Guest	Falcão	Biagioni	Dive points	Result
Episode 5 (November 5)	Raphael Sander (Tammy Takagi)	9.5	8.6	8.5	26.7	6th Eliminated
Episode 5 (November 5)	Kayky Brito (Pedro Abreu)	9.7	9.4	9.4	28.5	5th Safe
Episode 5 (November 5)	Diogo Sales (Natali Cruz)	9.8	9.6	9.5	28.9	4th Safe
Episode 5 (November 5)	Mariano (Nicole Cruz)	9.8	9.7	9.6	29.1	3rd Safe
Episode 5 (November 5)	Pedro Scooby (Renato Antunes)	10	10	10	30.0	1st Safe
Episode 5 (November 5)	Bruno Chateaubriand (Juliana Veloso)	10	10	10	30.0	1st Safe

=== Week 6 ===
Round 3 – Women

- Celebrity guest: Rodrigo Simas

Running order

5 metre platform synchronized
Episode 6 (November 12)	Contestant (Professional partner)	Scores			Dive points	Result
Episode 6 (November 12)	Contestant (Professional partner)	Guest	Falcão	Biagioni	Dive points	Result
Episode 6 (November 12)	Marcela Fetter (Natali Cruz)	9.3	8.7	8.5	26.5	5th Safe
Episode 6 (November 12)	Bella Falconi (Juliana Veloso)	9.6	8.8	8.7	27.1	4th Safe
Episode 6 (November 12)	Talytha Pugliesi (Pedro Abreu)	9.0	7.5	7.5	24.0	6th Eliminated
Episode 6 (November 12)	Lexa (Natali Cruz)	9.7	8.9	8.9	27.5	3rd Safe
Episode 6 (November 12)	Maíra Charken (Renato Antunes)	10	9.5	9.6	29.1	2nd Safe
Episode 6 (November 12)	Scheila Carvalho (Nicole Cruz)	10	10	10	30.0	1st Safe

=== Week 7 ===
Round 4 – Men

- Celebrity guest: Viviane Araújo

Running order

7.5 metre platform
Episode 7 (November 19)	Contestant	Scores			Dive points	Result
Episode 7 (November 19)	Contestant	Guest	Falcão	Biagioni	Dive points	Result
Episode 7 (November 19)	Kayky Brito	9.8	9.5	9.4	28.9	5th Eliminated
Episode 7 (November 19)	Diogo Sales	9.9	9.6	9.7	29.2	4th Safe
Episode 7 (November 19)	Bruno Chateaubriand	10	10	9.9	29.9	1st Safe
Episode 7 (November 19)	Pedro Scooby	9.9	9.7	9.7	29.3	3rd Safe
Episode 7 (November 19)	Mariano	10	10	9.9	29.9	1st Safe

=== Week 8 ===
Round 4 – Women

- Celebrity guest: José Aldo

Running order

7.5 metre platform
Episode 8 (November 26)	Contestant	Scores			Dive points	Result
Episode 8 (November 26)	Contestant	Guest	Falcão	Biagioni	Dive points	Result
Episode 8 (November 26)	Maíra Charken	10	9.8	9.6	29.4	1st Safe
Episode 8 (November 26)	Lexa	10	8.8	8.8	27.6	3rd Safe
Episode 8 (November 26)	Bella Falconi	9.0	7.4	7.2	23.6	5th Eliminated
Episode 8 (November 26)	Marcela Fetter	10	8.7	8.6	27.3	4th Safe
Episode 8 (November 26)	Scheila Carvalho	10	9.7	9.5	29.3	2nd Safe

=== Week 9 ===
Dive-off

- Celebrity guest: Marco Luque

Running order

Episode 9 (December 3)	Contestant (Dive height)	Scores			Dive points	Result
Episode 9 (December 3)	Contestant (Dive height)	Guest	Falcão	Biagioni	Dive points	Result
Episode 9 (December 3)	Women					
Episode 9 (December 3)	Talytha Pugliesi (3 metre springboard)	7.7	7.0	6.8	21.5	3rd Eliminated
Episode 9 (December 3)	Carol Barcellos (10 metre platform)	8.5	7.7	7.3	23.3	2nd Eliminated
Episode 9 (December 3)	Bella Falconi (5 metre platform)	9.5	8.5	8.3	26.3	1st Advanced
Episode 9 (December 3)	Men					
Episode 9 (December 3)	Naldo Benny (3 metre springboard)	8.0	7.0	6.9	21.9	3rd Eliminated
Episode 9 (December 3)	Raphael Sander (5 metre platform)	9.0	8.5	8.4	25.9	2nd Advanced
Episode 9 (December 3)	Kayky Brito (10 metre platform)	9.8	9.5	9.3	28.6	1st Advanced

=== Week 10 ===
Semifinals

- Celebrity guest: Mauro Naves

Running order

Free choice
Episode 10 (December 10)	Contestant (Dive height)	Scores			Dive points	Result
Episode 10 (December 10)	Contestant (Dive height)	Guest	Falcão	Biagioni	Dive points	Result
Episode 10 (December 10)	Women					
Episode 10 (December 10)	Bella Falconi (10 metre platform)	8.0	7.4	7.3	22.7	5th Eliminated
Episode 10 (December 10)	Lexa (5 metre platform)	8.8	8.2	8.3	25.2	4th Eliminated
Episode 10 (December 10)	Marcela Fetter (7.5 metre platform)	8.8	8.3	8.4	25.5	3rd Safe
Episode 10 (December 10)	Maíra Charken (7.5 metre platform)	9.7	9.5	9.6	28.8	2nd Safe
Episode 10 (December 10)	Scheila Carvalho (5 metre platform)	9.7	9.7	9.9	29.3	1st Safe
Episode 10 (December 10)	Men					
Episode 10 (December 10)	Raphael Sander (5 metre platform)	8.7	8.4	8.3	25.4	5th Eliminated
Episode 10 (December 10)	Kayky Brito (10 metre platform)	9.6	9.4	9.2	28.2	4th Eliminated
Episode 10 (December 10)	Diogo Sales (7.5 metre platform)	9.6	9.3	9.4	28.3	3rd Safe
Episode 10 (December 10)	Pedro Scooby (5 metre platform)	9.7	9.5	9.7	28.9	2nd Safe
Episode 10 (December 10)	Bruno Chateaubriand (5 metre platform)	10	10	10	30.0	1st Safe

=== Week 11 ===
Finals

- Celebrity guests: Fernanda Gentil & Tino Marcos (artistic judges) and Hugo Parisi (technical judge)

Running order

Free choice & 10 metre platform
Episode 11 (December 17)	Contestant (Dive height)	Scores			Dive points	Result
Episode 11 (December 17)	Contestant (Dive height)	Audience	Fernanda	Tino	Dive points	Result
Episode 11 (December 17)	Contestant (Dive height)	Parisi	Falcão	Biagioni	Dive points	Result
Episode 11 (December 17)	Dive 1 (Men)					
Episode 11 (December 17)	Diogo Sales (7.5 metre platform)	8.6	9.7	9.7	55.8	3rd
Episode 11 (December 17)	Diogo Sales (7.5 metre platform)	9.5	9.3	9.0	55.8	3rd
Episode 11 (December 17)	Pedro Scooby (10 metre platform)	9.3	9.9	9.8	56.0	2nd
Episode 11 (December 17)	Pedro Scooby (10 metre platform)	8.8	9.0	9.2	56.0	2nd
Episode 11 (December 17)	Bruno Chateaubriand (5 metre platform)	9.5	10	9.8	58.7	1st
Episode 11 (December 17)	Bruno Chateaubriand (5 metre platform)	9.9	9.7	9.8	58.7	1st
Episode 11 (December 17)	Dive 1 (Women)					
Episode 11 (December 17)	Marcela Fetter (7.5 metre platform)	8.5	9.6	9.6	54.0	3rd
Episode 11 (December 17)	Marcela Fetter (7.5 metre platform)	8.9	8.8	8.6	54.0	3rd
Episode 11 (December 17)	Maíra Charken (7.5 metre platform)	9.3	9.8	9.9	57.7	1st
Episode 11 (December 17)	Maíra Charken (7.5 metre platform)	9.3	9.7	9.7	57.7	1st
Episode 11 (December 17)	Scheila Carvalho (5 metre platform)	9.0	9.5	9.6	57.0	2nd
Episode 11 (December 17)	Scheila Carvalho (5 metre platform)	9.7	9.6	9.6	57.0	2nd
Episode 11 (December 17)	Dive 2 (Women)					
Episode 11 (December 17)	Scheila Carvalho (10 metre platform)	9.1	10	9.5	54.7	Runner-up (111.7)
Episode 11 (December 17)	Scheila Carvalho (10 metre platform)	8.6	8.7	8.8	54.7	Runner-up (111.7)
Episode 11 (December 17)	Maíra Charken (10 metre platform)	9.8	10	9.9	59.7	Winner (117.4)
Episode 11 (December 17)	Maíra Charken (10 metre platform)	10	10	10	59.7	Winner (117.4)
Episode 11 (December 17)	Marcela Fetter (10 metre platform)	8.9	10	9.7	54.8	Third place (108.8)
Episode 11 (December 17)	Marcela Fetter (10 metre platform)	8.9	8.7	8.6	54.8	Third place (108.8)
Episode 11 (December 17)	Dive 2 (Men)					
Episode 11 (December 17)	Pedro Scooby (10 metre platform)	9.1	10	9.6	55.8	Third place (111.8)
Episode 11 (December 17)	Pedro Scooby (10 metre platform)	8.9	9.2	9.0	55.8	Third place (111.8)
Episode 11 (December 17)	Diogo Sales (10 metre platform)	8.5	10	9.6	56.3	Runner-up (112.1)
Episode 11 (December 17)	Diogo Sales (10 metre platform)	9.5	9.5	9.2	56.3	Runner-up (112.1)
Episode 11 (December 17)	Bruno Chateaubriand (10 metre platform)	9.7	10	9.8	58.6	Winner (117.3)
Episode 11 (December 17)	Bruno Chateaubriand (10 metre platform)	9.8	9.8	9.5	58.6	Winner (117.3)
