= Bushfield =

Bushfield is a surname. Notable people with the surname include:

- Harlan J. Bushfield (1882–1948), American politician
- Rory Bushfield (born 1983), Canadian professional skier, filmmaker, and reality show star
- Vera C. Bushfield (1889–1976), American politician

== See also ==
- Bushfield, Victoria
- Bushfield (Mount Holly, Virginia)
- Ormiston Bushfield Academy, formerly known as the Bushfield Community College
