= Splash page =

Splash page may refer to:

- Splash page (comics), a comic book page that is mostly or entirely taken up by a single image or panel
- A splash screen on a website or software

== See also ==
- Splash (disambiguation)
- Page (disambiguation)
