= Juliana Paiva =

Brazilian actress (born 1993)

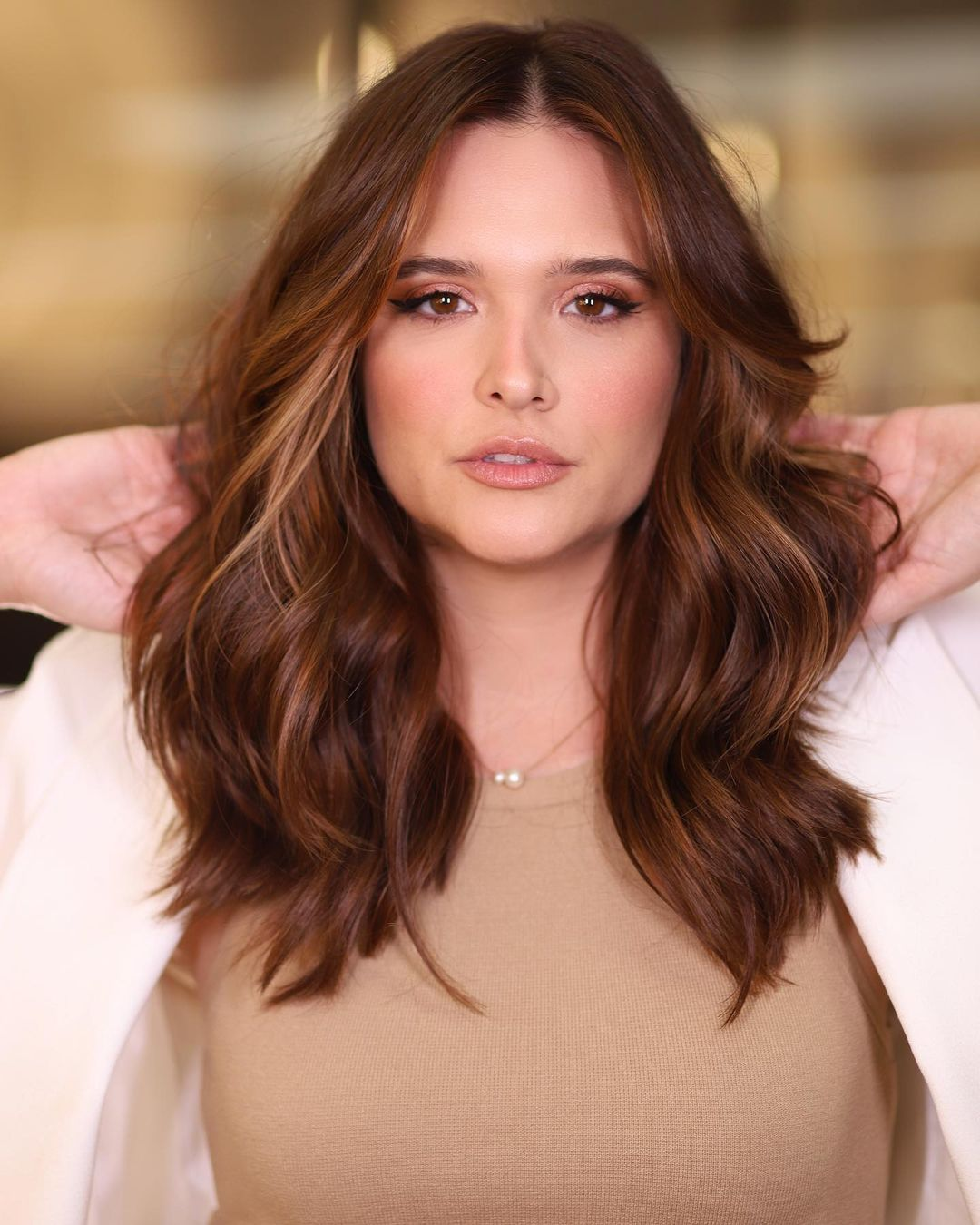
- Paiva in 2023
- Born: 28 March 1993 (age 33); Rio de Janeiro, Brazil
- Occupation: Actress
- Years active: 2009–present
- Height: 1.68 m (5 ft 6 in)

Juliana Paiva dos Santos (Portuguese: [ʒuliˈɐnɐ ˈpajvɐ]; born 28 March 1993) is a Brazilian actress.

== Biography ==
Paiva was born in Rio de Janeiro, the daughter of a former model. After her family moved with her to the state of Ceará, she studied acting and joined theater groups. After turning 14, she returned to Rio de Janeiro, convinced to work as an actress and, in 2009, she joined an acting agency. Paiva made her television debut in the Rede Globo telenovela Cama de Gato, followed by a guest appearance in Viver a Vida.

Paiva played Valquíria Spina in the 2010 remake of the telenovela Ti Ti Ti. She made her film debut that year in the teen film Desenrola, playing Tize.

She guest starred as Camila in Cheias de Charme in 2010. Paiva joined the cast of the twentieth season of Malhação as a promiscuous girl named Fatinha, a popular girl who seduced the school boys. Paiva became a teen icon because of the popularity of her character. She played the lead role of Lili in the 2013 Rede Globo telenovela Além do Horizonte.

== Filmography ==
=== Television ===
Year	Title	Role	Notes
2009	Viver a Vida	Diva	Episode: "28 September"
2009–2010	Cama de Gato	Beth	
2010–2011	Ti Ti Ti	Valquíria "Val" Spina	
2012	Cheias de Charme	Camila	Episodes: "12–13 May"
2012–2013	Malhação	Maria de Fátima "Fatinha" dos Prazeres	Season 20
2013–2014	Além do Horizonte	Alice "Lili" Barcelos Sampaio	
2014	Dança dos Famosos	Herself (Participant)	Season 11
2014	Malhação	Maria de Fátima "Fatinha" dos Prazeres	Episodes: "9–11 September"
2015–2016	Totalmente Demais	Sandra "Cassandra" Regina Matoso	
2017	A Força do Querer	Simone Garcia	
2018–2019	O Tempo Não Para	Maria Marcolina "Marocas" Sabino Machado	
2020–2021	Salve-se Quem Puder	Luna Furtado / Fiona Matteucci	
2024	Família é Tudo	Electra Mancini	
2024	Back To 15	Filipa Vieira	Season 3
2024	Sutura	Anna Romanelli	

=== Film ===
Year	Film	Role	Ref.
2010	Desenrola	Tize	
2017	Rúcula Com Tomate Seco	Suzana	
2018	O Homem Perfeito	Mel Teixeira	
2025	Elio	Olga Solis (Brazilian voice)	

=== Theater ===
Year	Play	Role	Ref.
2011	3 Ferramentas		
2011	Alice & Gabriel	Alice	
2013	Papo Calcinha	Jutinha	

=== Internet ===
Year	Title	Role	Ref.
2016	Totalmente Sem Noção Demais	Sandra "Cassandra" Regina Matoso	

== Videography ==
Year	Video clip	Singer	Album	Ref.
2014	Me Deixa Dançar	Johnny's		
2014	A vingança	Dilsinho	Dilsinho	
2014	Se Prepara	Dilsinho		
2014	Vai Vendo	Lucas Lucco	-	
2015	Gruda No Meu Coração	Vitor Ferraz		
2016	Dose Diária	Pedro Naves e Rafael		
2018	Não Desiste De Mim	Pedro Thomé		

== Awards and nominations ==
Year	Award	Category	Work	Result	Ref
2010	Capricho Awards	Best National Actress	Ti Ti Ti	Nominated	
2011	Prêmio Contigo! de TV	Best Television Newcomer	Ti Ti Ti	Nominated	
2013	Prêmio Extra de Televisão	Teen Idol	Malhação	Nominated	
2013	Capricho Awards	Best National Actress	Malhação	Nominated	
2013	Capricho Awards	Troféu Pegação (with Rodrigo Simas)	Malhação	Won	
2014	Troféu Internet	Best Newcomer of the Year	Além do Horizonte	Nominated	
2014	Melhores do Ano	Best Newcomer Actress	Além do Horizonte	Nominated	
2014	Prêmio Contigo! de TV	Best Telenovela Actress	Além do Horizonte	Nominated	
2015	Troféu Internet	Best Actress	Além do Horizonte	Nominated	
2015	Troféu Imprensa	Best Actress	Além do Horizonte	Nominated	
2016	Prêmio Extra de Televisão	Best Supporting Actress	Totalmente Demais	Nominated	
2016	Melhores do Ano	Best Supporting Actress	Totalmente Demais	Nominated	
2018	Troféu AIB de Imprensa	Best Actress	O Tempo Não Para	Nominated	
2018	Troféu UOL TV e Famosos	Best Actress (popular vote)	O Tempo Não Para	Won	
2018	Prêmio Extra de Televisão	Best Actress	O Tempo Não Para	Nominated	
2018	Prêmio Área VIP	Best Actress	O Tempo Não Para	Nominated	
2018	Prêmio Gshow	Shipp of the Year (with Nicolas Prattes)	O Tempo Não Para	Nominated	
2018	Prêmio The Brazilian Critic	Best Telenovela Actress	O Tempo Não Para	Nominated	
2018	Melhores do Ano Natelinha	Best Actress	O Tempo Não Para	Nominated	
2019	Prêmio Jovem Brasileiro	Best Actress	O Tempo Não Para	Won	
2019	Troféu Nelson Rodrigues	Arts	Homage	Won	
2020	Prêmio Jovem Brasileiro	Best Actress	Salve-se Quem Puder	Nominated	
2020	Prêmio BreakTudo	Best Brazilian Actress	Salve-se Quem Puder	Nominated	
2020	Capricho Awards	National Artist	Salve-se Quem Puder	Nominated	
2022	Troféu Imprensa	Best Actress	Salve-se Quem Puder	Nominated	
2022	Troféu Internet	Best Actress	Salve-se Quem Puder	Nominated	
2024	Prêmio Jovem Brasileiro	Best Actress	Família é Tudo	Nominated	
