= Celebrity Splash! =

Reality television franchise

- Created by: Reinout Oerlemans; Eyeworks
- Original work: Sterren Springen Op Zaterdag (Netherlands)
- Years: 2012–2014

Films and television
- Television series: Celebrity Splash! (independent international versions, see below)

Miscellaneous
- Genre: Reality television
- First aired: 25 August 2012; 14 years ago

Official website
- Production website

Celebrity Splash! (also known as Splash!) is a reality television franchise created by Dutch company Eyeworks, started from their Dutch reality show Sterren Springen Op Zaterdag which premièred in 2012. The franchise involves celebrities diving into the pool.

== Format ==
=== Origins and history ===
Splash has its origin and idea from German Olympic-themed variety TV show TV total Turmspringen (TV total Diving), it was first aired on 16 December 2004, in the TV total show, on ProSieben and was founded by Stefan Raab.

Both shows are similar in concept to the Netherlands-born Splash reality show format, which launched in August 2012 and is now produced in at least 10 other countries.

== International versions ==
: Currently airing franchise

Franchise with an upcoming season
Franchise no longer in production

Country	Local title	Channel	Winners	Judges	Main presenters
Argentina	Celebrity Splash!	Telefe	Series 1, 2013: Nazareno Móttola	Pampita Ardohain; Maximiliano Guerra; Miguel Ángel Rodríguez; Mariana Montes	Marley Wiebe
Australia	Celebrity Splash!	Seven Network	Series 1, 2013: Andrew Symonds	Alisa Camplin; Greg Louganis; Matthew Mitcham	Larry Emdur; Kylie Gillies
Belgium	De Grote Sprong	vtm	Series 1, 2013: Tanja Dexters	Frans Van De Konijnenburg; Anna Bader; Fréderic Deburghgraeve	Kürt Rogiers; Evi Hanssen
Brazil	Saltibum	Rede Globo	Series 1, 2014: Rômulo Neto; Series 2, 2015: Priscila Fantin and Rodrigo Simas; Series 3, 2016: Maíra Charken and Bruno Chateaubriand	Eduardo Falcão (1-2); Roberto Biagioni (2); Hugo Parisi (1)	Luciano Huck
Chile	Salta si puedes	Chilevisión	Series 1, 2013: Katherine Orellana; Series 2, 2013: Cristián Menares	Sebastián Keitel; Francisca García-Huidobro; Yoel Gutiérrez; Sergio Freire	Rafael Araneda; Carolina de Moras
China	Celebrity Splash!	Zhejiang TV	Series 1, 2013: Xian Zi	Zhou Jihong; Li Na; Li Xiaopeng; Zhang Tielin	Huang Jianxiang; Yi Yi ("伊一" in Chinese)
Finland	Splash!	Nelonen	Series 1, 2013: Martina Aitolehti	Joona Puhakka; Janne Kataja; Rosa Meriläinen	Ellen Jokikunnas; Sebastian Rejman
France	Splash: Le Grand Plongeon	TF1	Series 1, 2013: Clément Lefert	Laure Manaudou; Taïg Khris; Muriel Hermine; Grégory Couratier	Estelle Denis; Gérard Vives; Julie Taton
Germany	Die Pool Champions - Promis unter Wasser	RTL	Series 1, 2013: Magdalena Brzeska	Verona Pooth; Franziska van Almsick; Christian Keller; Gerd Völker	Marco Schreyl; Nazan Eckes
Lebanon	Splash	LBCI	Series 1, 2013: Silvio Chiha; Series 2, 2014: ?	Elie Saad; Sandrine Atallah; Todor Spasov	Rola Bahnam; Aiman Kaissouni
Lithuania	Šuolis!	TV3	Series 1, 2014: Eglė Straleckaitė	Series 1, 2014: Ignas Barkauskas; Kęstutis Autukas; Guest judge	Series 1, 2014: Monika Vaičiulytė; Mindaugas Stasiulis
Mexico	El gran chapuzón	Canal de las Estrellas	Series 1, 2014: Maya Karunna	Yahel Castillo; Paola Espinosa; Tatiana Ortiz	Alan Tacher
Netherlands (original format)	Sterren Springen Op Zaterdag	SBS 6	Series 1, 2012: Liza Sips; Series 2, 2014: Jeffrey Wammes	Frans van de Konijnenburg (1–2); Inge de Bruijn (2); Daphne Jongejans (1); Quintis Ristie (1)	Gerard Joling (1–2); Kim-Lian van der Meij (2); Tess Milne (1)
Norway	Skal vi stupe	TV 2	Series 1, 2013: Mini Jakobsen and Roar Strand	?	Freddy dos Santos; Sarah Natasha Melbye
Poland	Celebrity Splash!	Polsat	Series 1, 2015: Andrzej Szczęsny	Otylia Jędrzejczak; Tomasz Zimoch; Danuta Stenka	Krzysztof Jankowski; Łukasz Grass
Portugal	Splash! Celebridades	SIC	Series 1, 2013: Ricardo Guedes; Series 2, 2013: Pedro Azevedo	Marco Horácio; Sílvia Rita; Simão Morgado; Ricardo Guedes (2)	Júlia Pinheiro; Rui Unas
Romania	Splash! Vedete la apă	Antena 1	Series 1, 2013: Piticu` Series 2, 2014: Cosmin Soare; Series 3, 2015: Vladmir Drăghia; Series 4, 2021: Cristian Pulhac; Series 5, 2022: Edmond Zannidache; Series 6, 2024: Larisa Iordache	Current; Clara Gherase (4–6); Iulia Albu (4–6); Nea Marin (4–6); Cosmin Nantanticu (5–6) Former; Cătălin Preda (1–3); Anda Adam (1); Daniel Buzdugan (1); Ozana Barabancea (2–3); Cosmin Seleși (2–3); Jean de la Craiova (4); Bogdan Ioniță (4)	Current; Răzvan Fodor (4–6); Ramona Olaru (4–6); Anamaria Ionescu (6) Former; Pepe (1–3); Roxana Ionescu (1–2); Roxana Vancea (1); Bianca Drăgușanu (2); Alina Pușcaș (3); Diana Munteanu (3, 5); Anna Lesko (4); Monica Bârladeanu (5)
Russia	Вышка; Vyshka	Channel One Russia	Series 1, 2013: Maksim Sharafutdinov	Stanislav Sadal'skiy; Emmanuel Vitorgan; Tatyana Ustinova; Elena Waicehovskaya; Dmitriy Dibrov; Andrey Urgant	Viktor Vasiliev; Katerina Shpica
South Korea	Splash	MBC	Canceled		Shin Dong-yup; Jun Hyun-moo
Spain	Splash! Famosos al agua	Antena 3	Series 1, 2013: Gervasio Deferr	Guti; Emilio Ratia; Santiago Segura; Anna Tarrés	Arturo Valls; Ainhoa Arbizu
Sweden	Kändishoppet	TV3	Series 1, 2013: Tobbe Blom; Series 2, 2013: Frank Andersson	?	Adam Alsing; Carin da Silva
Turkey	Ben Burdan Atlarım	Show TV	?	?	Chloe Loughnan
Ukraine	Вишка; Vyshka	1+1	Series 1, 2013: Olha Kharlan	Volodymyr Zelenskyy; Tamara Tokmachova; Dmitry Sautin	Solomiya Vitvitska; Andriy Domanskyi
United Kingdom	Splash!	ITV	Series 1, 2013: Eddie "The Eagle" Edwards; Series 2, 2014: Perri Kiely	Andy Banks; Jo Brand; Leon Taylor	Gabby Logan; Vernon Kay
United States	Splash	ABC	Series 1, 2013: Rory Bushfield	David Boudia; Steve Foley	Joey Lawrence; Charissa Thompson

== Controversy ==
In 2012, French-based production group Banijay International requested an injunction against Dutch group Eyeworks, claiming the show is a copy of the older German format, TV total Turmspringen, created by Banijay subsidiary Brainpool TV.
