= Alexandra Rietz =

Police superintendent, presenter, and actress

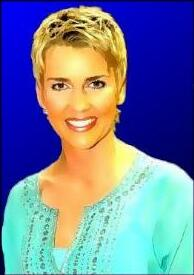
Image of Alexandra Rietz

Alexandra Rietz (born June 22, 1971, Bad Oeynhausen) is a former police superintendent, presenter and actor.

== Life ==
After vocational training as Steuerfachgehilfin, Rietz studied at the Fachhochschule of the police in Oldenburg from 1994 to 1997. She worked in the police service until 2003, including as a police superintendent at the Osnabrück Criminal Investigation Department Osnabrück (acquisitive crime, sexual offenses, robbery, homicide, state security), in the area of investigation and reconnaissance at Expo 2000 as well as in a SOKO in the State Criminal Police Office of Lower Saxony.

From 2003 to 2013 and from 2020 to 2021, she played the female lead in the television series K11 - Kommissare im Einsatz and K11 - Die neuen Fälle.

In 2009, Gerhard Hess Verlag published the novel KunstBlut. In this novel, she describes life as a police inspector and hopes to make a contribution to recruiting young talent.

In 2010, she took part in TV total Turmspringen and took first place in individual diving. On January 11, 2011, she appeared in the show Fort Boyard. She also took part in Promi Big Brother: The Experiment in August 2014.

Alexandra Rietz is involved in animal welfare and as an honorary ambassador for the Stiftung Kinderhospiz Mitteldeutschland Nordhausen e. V. in Tambach-Dietharz.

In January 2016, Rietz gave birth to her first child, a daughter.

From February 2024, she can be seen as a candidate in the big celebrity baking show.

== Filmography ==
- 2003–2013, 2020–2022: K11 - Kommissare im Einsatz (TV series, 2002 episodes)
- 2008: Clever! - Die Show, die Wissen schafft
- 2007–2010: TV total Turmspringen
- 2010: Frank Elstner – Menschen der Woche
- 2010: Anna und die Liebe (guest appearance)
- 2011: Fort Boyard
- 2011: Die Oliver Pocher Show
- 2013–2014: KRASS, RTL2
- 2014: Promi Big Brother: Das Experiment
- 2015: K11 – Special
- since 2020: Ungelöst und unvergessen
- 2020: Genial oder Daneben?
- since 2021: Wenn Menschen verschwinden
- 2024: Das große Promibacken

== Works ==
- Kunstblut, Gerhard Hess Verlag 2009, ISBN 387336929X
