= Saltibum season 1 =

Saltibum
- Season 1
- Presented by: Luciano Huck
- Judges: Eduardo Falcão; Hugo Parisi
- Winner: Rômulo Neto
- Runner-up: Camilla Camargo

Release
- Original network: Rede Globo
- Original release: April 5 – May 31, 2014

Season chronology
- Next → Season 2

Saltibum is the first season of the Brazilian version of Celebrity Splash!. The season premiered on April 5, 2014 and run for 9 weeks, ending on May 31, 2014 on Rede Globo.

Actor Rômulo Neto won the competition over actress Camilla Camargo by a difference of 1.0 point.

== Format ==
Twelve Brazilian celebrities were equally divided into two teams led by captains Caio Castro (Red team) and Felipe Titto (Blue team).

The captains are ineligible to win the main prize (a new Volkswagen Up) and are instead competing in weekly dive-offs to win their own car, which would be awarded to the captain who have the highest amount of scores combined over the course of 9 weeks.

=== Captains dive-off ===
	Caio Castro					Felipe Titto				
	Scores			Weekly Points	Overall Points	Scores			Weekly Points	Overall Points
	Guest	Hugo	Eduardo	Weekly Points	Overall Points	Guest	Hugo	Eduardo	Weekly Points	Overall Points
Wk 1	10	9.0	9.0	28.0	28.0	9.5	8.0	8.5	26.0	26.0
Wk 2	10	9.6	9.6	29.2	57.2	10	9.6	9.8	29.4	55.4
Wk 3	9.8	8.4	8.4	26.6	83.8	10	9.6	9.6	29.2	84.6
Wk 4	9.4	9.2	9.4	28.0	111.8	9.6	9.4	9.6	28.6	113.2
Wk 5	10	9.6	9.8	29.4	141.2	10	9.2	9.2	28.4	141.6
Wk 6	9.8	10	9.6	29.4	170.6	9.8	10	9.8	29.6	171.2
Wk 7	9.6	9.0	9.4	28.0	198.6	9.2	8.8	9.2	27.2	198.4
Wk 8	9.2	9.0	9.4	27.6	226.2	10	9.8	9.8	29.6	228.0
Final	10	9.2	9.4	28.6	254.8	9.8	8.8	9.0	27.6	255.6
Final	10	10	10	30.0	284.8	10	9.8	10	29.8	285.4

== Contestants ==
Contestant	Occupation	Status
Carlos Machado	Former World Champion in Brazilian Jiu-Jitsu	Eliminated 1st on April 19, 2014
Ildi Silva	Tropical Paradise and Bela, a Feia Actress	Eliminated 2nd on April 26, 2014
Eri Johnson	Popstar	Eliminated 3rd on May 3, 2014
Raquel Villar	Cat's Cradle and Two Faces Actress	Eliminated 4th on May 10, 2014
Kiko Pissolato	Actor, Author, & Entrepreneur	Eliminated 5th on May 17, 2014
Duda Nagle	TV Actor	Eliminated 6th on May 17, 2014
Fiorella Mattheis	Actress, Model, & Presenter	Eliminated 7th on May 24, 2014
Priscila Marinho	TV Actress	Eliminated 8th on May 24, 2014
Rhaisa Batista	Model & Actress	Eliminated 9th on May 24, 2014
Leonardo Miggiorin	TV Actor	Eliminated 10th on May 24, 2014
Camilla Camargo	Actress	Runner-up on May 31, 2014
Rômulo Neto	TV Actor	Winner on May 31, 2014

== Scoring chart ==
Contestant	Place	Wk 1	Wk 2	Wk 3	Wk 4	Wk 5	Wk 6	Wk 7	Wk 8	Final
Rômulo Neto	1	27.8	—	28.0	—	26.3	—	30.0	29.4	57.8
Camilla Camargo	2	—	28.4	—	28.2	—	27.0	—	30.0	56.8
Leonardo Miggiorin	3	22.1	—	26.6	—	29.8	—	30.0	27.8	
Rhaisa Batista	4	—	27.2	—	25.2	—	25.6	—	27.6	
Priscila Marinho	5	—	24.0	—	27.8	—	28.0	—	27.0	
Fiorella Mattheis	6	—	26.0	—	27.2	—	25.6	—	27.2	
Duda Nagle	7	22.6	—	27.6	—	25.4	—	27.0		
Kiko Pissolato	8	23.1	—	26.4	—	26.4	—	26.8		
Raquel Villar	9	—	27.0	—	27.0	—	21.5			
Eri Johnson	10	23.1	—	24.3	—	22.0				
Ildi Silva	11	—	24.5	—	25.8					
Carlos Machado	12	23.0	—	21.7						

=== Average chart ===
Rank by average	Place	Contestant	Total points	Number of dives	Average
1	1	Rômulo Neto	199.3	7	28.5
2	2	Camilla Camargo	170.4	6	28.4
3	3	Leonardo Miggiorin	136.3	5	27.3
4	5	Priscila Marinho	106.8	4	26.7
5	6	Fiorella Mattheis	106.0	4	26.5
6	4	Rhaisa Batista	105.6	4	26.4
7	8	Kiko Pissolato	102.7	4	25.7
8	7	Duda Nagle	102.6	4	25.6
9	9	Raquel Villar	75.5	3	25.2
10	11	Ildi Silva	50.3	2	25.1
11	10	Eri Johnson	69.4	3	23.1
12	12	Carlos Machado	44.7	2	22.3

== Show details ==
=== Week 1 ===
- Celebrity Guest Judge: Humberto Martins

Running order

3 metre
Contestant	Scores			Weekly Points	Weekly Rank	Overall Points	Overall Rank
Contestant	Guest	Hugo	Eduardo	Weekly Points	Weekly Rank	Overall Points	Overall Rank
Carlos Machado	8.0	7.5	7.5	23.0	4th	23.0	4th
Kiko Pissolato	8.6	7.5	7.0	23.1	2nd	23.1	2nd
Leonardo Miggiorin	8.6	7.0	6.5	22.1	6th	22.1	6th
Duda Nagle	8.6	7.0	7.0	22.6	5th	22.6	5th
Rômulo Neto	10	8.8	9.0	27.8	1st	27.8	1st
Eri Johnson	8.6	7.0	7.5	23.1	2nd	23.1	2nd

=== Week 2 ===
- Celebrity Guest Judge: Emanuelle Araújo

Running order

3 metre
Contestant	Scores			Weekly Points	Weekly Rank	Overall Points	Overall Rank
Contestant	Guest	Hugo	Eduardo	Weekly Points	Weekly Rank	Overall Points	Overall Rank
Ildi Silva	9.0	7.5	8.0	24.5	5th	24.5	5th
Fiorella Mattheis	9.4	8.2	8.4	26.0	4th	26.0	4th
Rhaisa Batista	9.6	8.8	8.8	27.2	2nd	27.2	2nd
Raquel Villar	9.6	8.8	8.6	27.0	3rd	27.0	3rd
Camilla Camargo	9.8	9.2	9.4	28.4	1st	28.4	1st
Priscila Marinho	9.0	7.5	7.5	24.0	6th	24.0	6th

=== Week 3 ===
- Celebrity Guest Judge: Nelson Freitas

Running order

5 metre
Contestant	Scores			Weekly Points	Weekly Rank	Overall Points	Overall Rank
Contestant	Guest	Hugo	Eduardo	Weekly Points	Weekly Rank	Overall Points	Overall Rank
Rômulo Neto	9.8	9.0	9.2	28.0	1st	55.8	1st
Eri Johnson	9.8	7.0	7.5	24.3	5th	47.4	5th
Kiko Pissolato	9.6	8.4	8.4	26.4	4th	49.5	3rd
Carlos Machado	9.2	6.5	6.0	21.7	6th	44.7	6th
Duda Nagle	10	8.6	9.0	27.6	2nd	50.2	2nd
Leonardo Miggiorin	9.8	8.4	8.6	26.6	3rd	48.7	4th

=== Week 4 ===
- Celebrity Guest Judge: Geovanna Tominaga

Running order

5 metre
Contestant	Scores			Weekly Points	Weekly Rank	Overall Points	Overall Rank
Contestant	Guest	Hugo	Eduardo	Weekly Points	Weekly Rank	Overall Points	Overall Rank
Camilla Camargo	9.2	9.6	9.4	28.2	1st	56.6	1st
Rhaisa Batista	9.0	8.2	8.0	25.2	6th	52.4	4th
Raquel Villar	9.0	9.0	9.0	27.0	4th	54.0	2nd
Fiorella Mattheis	9.4	8.6	9.2	27.2	3rd	53.2	3rd
Ildi Silva	9.0	8.0	8.8	25.8	5th	50.3	6th
Priscila Marinho	9.4	9.0	9.4	27.8	2nd	51.8	5th

=== Week 5 ===
- Celebrity Guest Judge: Ana Furtado

Running order

7.5 metre
Contestant	Scores			Weekly Points	Weekly Rank	Overall Points	Overall Rank
Contestant	Guest	Hugo	Eduardo	Weekly Points	Weekly Rank	Overall Points	Overall Rank
Rômulo Neto	9.8	8.0	8.5	26.3	3rd	82.1	1st
Duda Nagle	9.2	8.0	8.2	25.4	4th	75.6	4th
Kiko Pissolato	9.4	8.4	8.6	26.4	2nd	75.9	3rd
Leonardo Miggiorin	10	9.8	10	29.8	1st	78.5	2nd
Eri Johnson	9.0	7.0	6.0	22.0	5th	69.4	5th

=== Week 6 ===
- Celebrity Guest Judge: Paulo Vilhena

Running order

7.5 metre
Contestant	Scores			Weekly Points	Weekly Rank	Overall Points	Overall Rank
Contestant	Guest	Hugo	Eduardo	Weekly Points	Weekly Rank	Overall Points	Overall Rank
Camilla Camargo	10	8.4	8.6	27.0	2nd	83.6	1st
Raquel Villar	9.0	6.0	6.5	21.5	5th	75.5	5th
Fiorella Mattheis	9.6	8.0	8.0	25.6	3rd	78.8	3rd
Rhaisa Batista	9.6	8.0	8.0	25.6	3rd	78.0	4th
Priscila Marinho	9.8	8.8	9.4	28.0	1st	79.8	2nd

=== Week 7 ===
- Celebrity Guest Judge: Tande

Running order

Free choice
Contestant	Scores			Overall Points	Overall Rank	Dive Height	Final Result
Contestant	Guest	Hugo	Eduardo	Overall Points	Overall Rank	Dive Height	Final Result
Duda Nagle	9.2	8.8	9.0	27.0	3rd	7.5 m	Out
Kiko Pissolato	9.6	8.6	8.6	26.8	4th	10 m	Out
Leonardo Miggiorin	10	10	10	30.0	1st	10 m	Dive-Off
Rômulo Neto	10	10	10	30.0	1st	10 m	Dive-Off

=== Week 8 ===
- Celebrity Guest Judge: Glenda Kozlowski

Running order

Free choice
Contestant	Scores			Overall Points	Overall Rank	Dive Height	Final Result
Contestant	Guest	Hugo	Eduardo	Overall Points	Overall Rank	Dive Height	Final Result
Rhaisa Batista	9.2	9.2	9.2	27.6	2nd	5 m	Out
Fiorella Mattheis	9.2	9.0	9.0	27.2	3rd	5 m	Out
Priscila Marinho	9.0	8.8	9.2	27.0	4th	7.5 m	Out
Camilla Camargo	10	10	10	30.0	1st	7.5 m	Finalist
Dive-Off
Rômulo Neto	10	9.6	9.8	29.4	1st	10 m	Finalist
Leonardo Miggiorin	9.4	9.2	9.2	27.8	2nd	10 m	Out

=== Final ===
- Celebrity Guest Judge: Cláudia Raia

Running order

Free choice
Contestant	Scores			Overall Points	Overall Rank	Dive Height	Final Result
Contestant	Guest	Hugo	Eduardo	Overall Points	Overall Rank	Dive Height	Final Result
Camilla Camargo	9.8	9.6	9 6	29.0	2nd	7.5 m	Out
Rômulo Neto	10	9.6	9 8	29.2	1st	10 m	Winner

10 metre
Contestant	Scores			Round Points	Overall Points	Overall Rank	Final Result
Contestant	Guest	Hugo	Eduardo	Round Points	Overall Points	Overall Rank	Final Result
Rômulo Neto	10	9.0	9 4	28.4	57.8	1st	Winner
Camilla Camargo	10	8.8	9 0	27.8	56.9	2nd	Out
