= Sterren Springen Op Zaterdag =

Dutch reality television series

Sterren Springen Op Zaterdag is a Dutch reality television series produced by Eyeworks and broadcast on SBS6. It was the first show to use the Celebrity Splash! format created by the same company.
