= TV total Turmspringen =

Reality television franchise

- Created by: Stefan Raab
- Original work: TV total Turmspringen (Germany)
- Years: 2004–2015, 2024, 2026

Films and television
- Television series: Stars in Danger (independent international versions, see below)

Miscellaneous
- Genre: Reality television
- First aired: 16 December 2004; 21 years ago

TV total Turmspringen is a reality television franchise created by German presenter Stefan Raab. The franchise involves celebrities diving into the pool.

== Format ==
=== Origins and history ===
TV total Turmspringen (TV total Diving) is an Olympic-themed variety TV show that was first aired on 16 December 2004, in the TV total show, on ProSieben and was founded by Stefan Raab and hosted by Sonya Kraus.

The idea for the German show has been adopted by US network FOX and aired as a two-hour special, renamed Stars in Danger: The High Dive, on 9 January 2013.

A similar show has been made in the Netherlands with the title Celebrity Splash! and launched in August 2012.

== International versions ==
Currently airing franchise
Franchise with an upcoming season
Franchise no longer in production

Country	Local title	Channel	Winners	Judges	Main presenters
Germany (original format)	TV total Turmspringen	ProSieben	Series 1, 2004: Lucy Diakovska; Series 2, 2005: Lars Börgeling; Series 3, 2007: Joey Kelly; Series 4, 2008: Steffen Groth; Series 5, 2009: Fabian Hambüchen; Series 6, 2010: Alexandra Rietz; Series 7, 2011: Fabian Hambüchen; Series 8, 2012: Annabelle Mandeng; Series 9, 2013: Steffen Groth; Series 10, 2014: Miss Ronja; Series 11, 2015: Daniel Aminati; Series 12, 2024: Marcel Nguyen; Series 13, 2026: Fabian Hambüchen	Unknown	Ingolf Lück (1); Kai Pflaume (2); Oliver Welke (3–5); Matthias Opdenhövel (6); Steven Gätjen (7–13)
Italy	Jump! Stasera mi tuffo	Canale 5	Series 1, 2013: Stefano Bettarini	Giorgio Cagnotto; Alessia Filippi; Anna Paola Concia; Maurizio ″Mister OK″ Palmulli; Paolo Bonolis	Teo Mammucari
Spain	¡Mira quién salta!	Telecinco	Series 1, 2013: Verónica Hidalgo; Series 2, 2014: Sergi Capdevila	Bibiana Fernández (1); Boris Izaguirre (1-2); Carlos Pumares (1); Javier Illana (1); Lola Sáez (1-2); Gemma Mengual (2); José Corbacho (2)	Jesús Vázquez; Marta Simonet
United States	Stars in Danger: The High Dive	FOX	Series 1, 9 January 2013: Antonio Sabàto Jr.	Unknown	Kyle Martino; Becky Baeling

The format has also been sold to broadcasters in Norway, China and Canada.

== Controversy with Celebrity Splash! ==
In 2012, French-based production group Banijay International requested an injunction against Dutch group Eyeworks, claiming the show is a copy of the older German format, TV total Turmspringen, created by Banijay subsidiary Brainpool TV.
