= Bruno Gissoni =

Brazilian actor (born 1986)

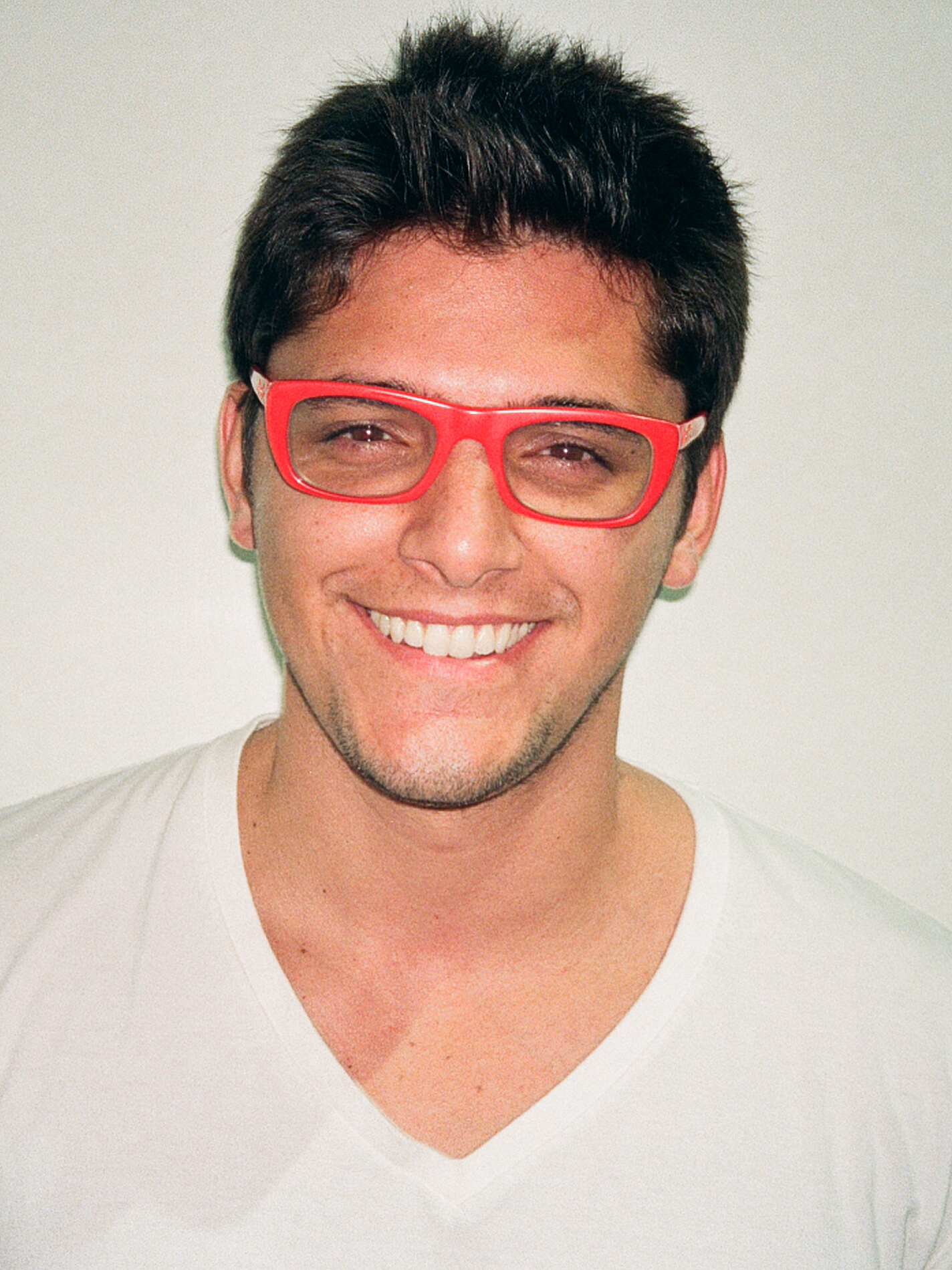
- Gissoni in 2011
- Born: Bruno Sang Gissoni; 9 December 1986 (age 39); Rio de Janeiro, Brazil
- Occupation: Actor
- Years active: 2006–present
- Spouse: Yanna Lavigne (m. 2018)
- Children: 2
- Parents: Ana Paula Sang (mother); Beto Simas (step-father)
- Relatives: Rodrigo Simas (half-brother); Felipe Simas (half-brother)

Bruno Sang Gissoni (born 9 December 1986) is a Brazilian actor.

== Biography ==
Born in Rio de Janeiro, Bruno lived for eight years in Los Angeles, United States. In Los Angeles he attended Venice High School. Back in Brazil, he played professional soccer for São Paulo FC and Nova Iguaçu Futebol Clube.

In 2007, he made a cameo in the novel Alta Estação, the Rede Record. He debuted in theater in 2009, with the number Capitães de Areia, based on literary works of Jorge Amado, and soon after, joined the Actors School Rede Record, given by actor Roberto Bomtempo.

The same year he also joined the cast of the play Os Melhores anos de nossas vidas. In 2010, he had his first role in television, when it pioneered the tenth to eighth season of Malhação. In 2011 works in the series Julie e os Fantasmas, exhibited by Rede Bandeirantes, in 2012, he joined the cast of the telenovela Avenida Brasil, Rede Globo.

In 2013, the telenovela was the Flor do Caribe, playing the fisherman Juliano.

== Personal life ==
Bruno is the son of Ana Paula Sang producer and stepson of capoeirista Beto Simas, and is also the brother of actor Rodrigo Simas, with whom he served in Capitães de Areia and Os Melhores anos de nossas vidas, and the football player Felipe Simas. He married actress Yanna Lavigne in 2018 after being in a relationship since 2013. In 2017, they welcomed a daughter, Madalena.

== Filmography ==
=== Television ===
| Year | Title | Role | Notes |
|---|---|---|---|
| 2007 | Alta Estação | Friend Drica | Cameo |
| 2010 | Malhação | Pedro López | |
| 2011 | Julie e os Fantasmas | Caco | Cameo |
| 2012 | Avenida Brasil | Iran Barbosa | |
| 2013 | Flor do Caribe | Juliano Pereira | |
| 2014 | Em Família | André Machado | |
| 2014 | Dança dos Famosos | Himself | Reality show of Domingão do Faustão |
| 2015 | Babilônia | Guto | |
| 2015 | Não se Apega Não | Himself | Cameo |
| 2016 | Malhação | João Antônio Miranda "Toninho" | |
| 2017 | Os Trapalhões | Dedeco/Various | |
| 2018 | Orgulho e Paixão | Diogo Uirapuru | |
| 2019 | A Dona do Pedaço | William/Bernardo | Cameo |
| 2023 | Rio Connection | Bruno Legere | |
| 2023 | Impuros | Santos | |

=== Theater ===
| Year | Title |
|---|---|
| 2009 | Capitães de Areia |
| 2009 | Os Melhores anos de nossas vidas |
| 2012 | Romeu na Roda |
| 2014 | A História dos Amantes |
| 2015 | Não Me Toc |
| 2015 | Dzi Croquettes em Bandália |
| 2022 | Ponto a Ponto – 4000 milhas |
