= Learning Unlimited =

Nonprofit organization dedicated to education outreach

- Abbreviation: LU
- Founded: 2007; 19 years ago
- Tax ID no.: 90-0513935
- Purpose: Education non-profit
- Location: Cambridge, Massachusetts
- Website: learningu.org

Learning Unlimited (also known as LU) is a US nonprofit organization founded in 2007 that supports college students and creates educational outreach activities for area middle and high school students.

LU's primary program, Splash, has spread from MIT (where it originated in 1988) to approximately thirty universities nationwide, including Cornell, Stanford, and Yale.

== About ==
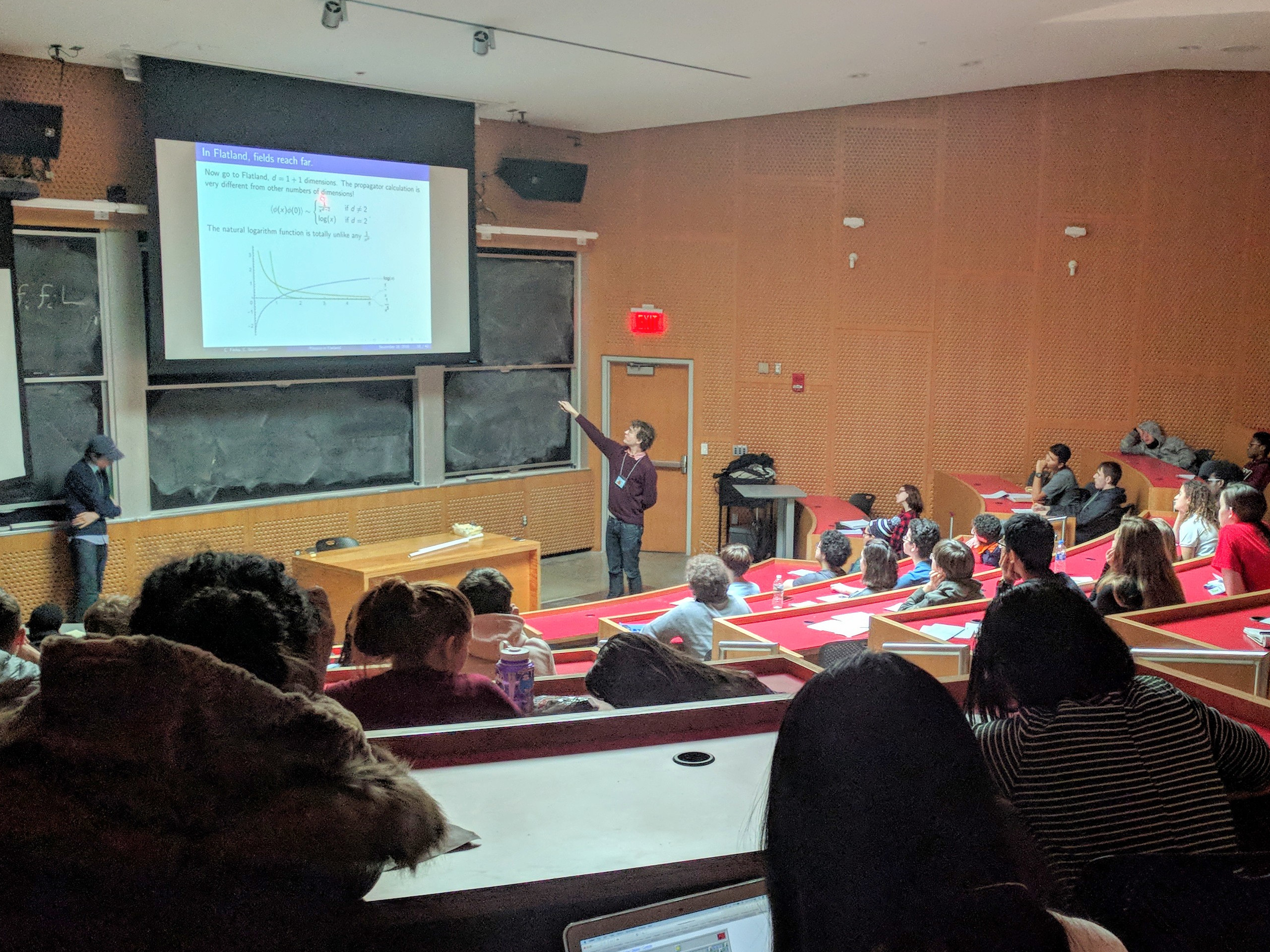
A class at MIT Splash, a LU-affiliated program

LU was founded in 2007 by alumni of the MIT Educational Studies Program and Stanford Splash.

LU's mission is to support the creation and operation of new Splash programs, educational outreach programs run by university students. The organization functions by providing assistance to new programs, including mentorship, software support, and leadership development. LU values independence and autonomy, both for their university partners and for the younger students who attend the outreach programs.

== Chapters ==
LU affiliates are known as chapters, and they operate with a high degree of autonomy. As of 2024, LU has 18 chapters at various American universities.

=== Northeastern United States ===
- Boston College
- Brandeis University
- Clark University
- Columbia University
- Cornell University
- Harvard University
- Marist College
- Massachusetts Institute of Technology
- Northeastern University
- University of Rochester
- Yale University

=== Midwestern United States ===
- University of Chicago
- Northwestern University
- University of Illinois at Urbana–Champaign

=== Mid-Atlantic United States ===
- Johns Hopkins University
- Princeton University

=== Southern United States ===
- Emory University

=== Western United States ===
- University of California, Berkeley
- Granite Hills High School (El Cajon, California)
- Stanford University
- University of California, Los Angeles
