= K11 – Kommissare im Einsatz =

German television show

- Created by: Constantin Entertainment GmbH
- Starring: Michael Naseband; Alexandra Rietz; Gerrit Grassl; Jonas Rohrmann; Sewarion Kirkitadse; Branco Vukovic
- Country of origin: Germany
- No. of seasons: 13
- No. of episodes: 2054

Original release
- Release: September 1, 2003

K11 – Kommissare im Einsatz is a German pseudo-documentary in the style of a real-life crime drama, which is broadcast on the private channels Sat.1 and Puls 4 and so far consists of 11 seasons. The show also inspired a very similar show in Poland called W11 - Wydział Śledczy.

== Action ==
The series depicts the everyday life of four commissioners in the fight against crime. Detective Inspector Michael Naseband and his colleague, Detective Chief Commissioner Alexandra Rietz conduct together the K11. In their work, they are supported by Kriminaloberkommissar Gerrit Grass and Detective Robert Ritter (Jonas Rohrmann). Starting point of a series is usually a murder that must be solved. K11 – Kommissare im Einsatz is based on the Whodunit principle (unknown offender) . Witnesses, relatives, offenders, victims and suspects are played by non-actors, many of which have appeared in several episodes.

== Team ==
Initial four Detective Chief Commissioners determined weekly alternately into two teams. A week Michael Naseband and Alexandra Rietz went on the chase, in the next determined Jens Loors and Nicole Drawer. On 11 July 2004, resulted in 180, less than a year after the start of the series, and left Drawer Loors the pseudo-documentary, and returned to the real police.

The following three months Alex Rietz and her colleague Michael Naseband found alone until they start off on the 11th season October 2004 were amplified by the Chief Inspector Branco Vukovic. In January 2006 he was transferred to Kosovo. That same day began Gerrit Grass from Narcotics service in K11.

At the time, the head of Rietz and Naseband the Detective Chief Commissioners and Gerrit Grass just a simple detective. This changed in the episode aired in July 2006 to the Prosecutor of fear, in which all three commissioners were transported. In early February 2008, the team was increased by Detective Robert Ritter. This came out of the spin-off of K11, CTI - people lie, not evidence.

Since the 8th Season Sewarion Kirkitadse is no longer occurred at K11, but there was neither an official exit a farewell episode.

== See also ==
- List of German television series
