= Saltibum season 2 =

Saltibum
- Season 2
- Winners: Priscila Fantin, Rodrigo Simas
- No. of episodes: 11

Release
- Original network: Rede Globo
- Original release: April 11 – June 27, 2015

Season chronology
- ← Previous; Season 1 Next → Season 3

The second season of Saltibum premiered on April 11, 2015 at 5:30 p.m. (BRT/AMT) on Rede Globo. Luciano Huck returned to present, alongside resident judge Eduardo Falcão. Hugo Parisi was replaced by Roberto Biagioni.

This season had two winners (one male and one female), as opposed to the single winner format used in previous season. Actress Priscila Fantin won the Women's final against singer Thaeme, while actor Rodrigo Simas beat dancer Jacaré in the Men's final.

== Contestants ==
Men
Celebrity	Known for	Status	Ref.
Alexandre Slaviero	Actor	Withdrew on April 11, 2015	
Jonatas Faro	Actor	Round 2 on April 25, 2015	
Tande	Former volleyball player	Round 3 on May 9, 2015	
Leandro Lima	Actor	Round 4 on May 23, 2015	
Jesus Luz	Model & DJ	Round 5 on June 20, 2015	
Jacaré	Dancer	Runner-up on June 27, 2015	
Rodrigo Simas	Actor	Winner on June 27, 2015	

Women
Celebrity	Known for	Eliminated	Ref.
Yanna Lavigne	Actress	Round 2 on May 2, 2015	
Carol Nakamura	Dancer	Round 3 on May 16, 2015	
Gracyanne Barbosa	Fitness model	Round 4 on May 30, 2015	
Érika Januza	Actress	Round 5 on June 13, 2015	
Ana Carolina Dias	Actress	Round 5 on June 13, 2015	
Thaeme	Singer	Runner-up on June 27, 2015	
Priscila Fantin	Actress	Winner on June 27, 2015	

== Scoring chart ==
Contestant	Place	Round 1	Round 2	Round 3	Round 4	Round 5	Round 6
Women
Priscila Fantin	1	27.0	30.0	29.3	30.0	56.9	60.0
Thaeme	2	23.0	27.0	27.9	27.6	53.8	54.2
Ana Carolina Dias	3	23.3	26.6	27.5	28.1	53.0	
Érika Januza	4	23.1	26.0	27.8	27.2	52.1	
Gracyanne Barbosa	5	21.7	26.6	27.9	26.9		
Carol Nakamura	6	24.0	26.8	27.2			
Yanna Lavigne	7	21.7	26.0				
Men
Rodrigo Simas	1	28.9	29.3	27.8	29.9	59.7	60.0
Jacaré	2	22.7	27.1	27.5	29.8	58.6	59.0
Jesus Luz	3	26.2	27.7	27.6	29.9	57.0	
Leandro Lima	4	22.5	26.0	26.6	29.8		
Tande	5	27.8	28.5	26.4			
Jonatas Faro	6	21.5	25.9				
Alexandre Slaviero	7	WD					

== Show details ==
=== Week 1 ===
Round 1 – Men & Women (Day 1)

Aired: April 11, 2015

- Celebrity guest judge: Felipe Titto

Running order

3 metre springboard
Contestant	Scores			Dive points	Result
Contestant	Guest	Roberto	Eduardo	Dive points	Result
Women
Carol Nakamura	9.0	7.5	7.5	24.0	2nd
Thaeme	9.0	7.0	7.0	23.0	4th
Ana Carolina Dias	8.8	7.5	7.0	23.3	3rd
Priscila Fantin	10	8.4	8.6	27.0	1st
Men
Leandro Lima	9.0	7.0	6.5	22.5	3rd
Tande	10	8.8	9.0	27.8	1st
Jesus Luz	10	8.0	8.2	26.2	2nd
Alexandre Slaviero	Withdrew				Out

=== Week 2 ===
Round 1 – Men & Women (Day 2)

Aired: April 18, 2015

- Celebrity guest judge: Rômulo Neto

Running order

3 metre springboard
Contestant	Scores			Dive points	Result
Contestant	Guest	Roberto	Eduardo	Dive points	Result
Women
Yanna Lavigne	8.2	7.0	6.5	21.7	2nd
Érika Januza	8.6	7.5	7.0	23.1	1st
Gracyanne Barbosa	8.2	7.0	6.5	21.7	2nd
Men
Jonatas Faro	8.0	7.0	6.5	21.5	3rd
Jacaré	8.2	7.5	7.0	22.7	2nd
Rodrigo Simas	10	9.4	9.5	28.9	1st

=== Week 3 ===
Round 2 – Men

Aired: April 25, 2015

- Celebrity guest judge: José Loreto

Running order

5 metre platform
Contestant	Scores			Dive points	Result (Total points)
Contestant	Guest	Roberto	Eduardo	Dive points	Result (Total points)
Jesus Luz	9.5	9.2	9.0	27.7	3rd (53.9)
Jacaré	9.5	8.8	8.8	27.1	4th (49.8)
Tande	9.8	9.5	9.2	28.5	2nd (56.3)
Rodrigo Simas	10	9.7	9.6	29.3	1st (58.2)
Leandro Lima	9.4	8.4	8.2	26.0	5th (48.5)
Jonatas Faro	9.5	8.4	8.0	25.9	Out (47.4)

=== Week 4 ===
Round 2 – Women

Aired: May 2, 2015

- Celebrity guest judge: Louro José

Running order

5 metre platform
Contestant	Scores			Dive points	Result (Total points)
Contestant	Guest	Roberto	Eduardo	Dive points	Result (Total points)
Ana Carolina Dias	10	8.2	8.4	26.6	4th (49.9)
Carol Nakamura	10	8.2	8.6	26.8	2nd (50.8)
Érika Januza	10	8.0	8.0	26.0	5th (49.1)
Priscila Fantin	10	10	10	30.0	1st (57.0)
Thaeme	10	8.4	8.6	27.0	3rd (50.0)
Yanna Lavigne	10	8.0	8.0	26.0	Out (47.7)
Gracyanne Barbosa	10	8.2	8.4	26.6	6th (48.3)

=== Week 5 ===
Round 3 – Men

Aired: May 9, 2015

- Celebrity guest judge: Fernanda Gentil

Running order

7.5 metre platform
Contestant	Scores			Total points	Result
Contestant	Guest	Roberto	Eduardo	Total points	Result
Leandro Lima	9.2	8.8	8.6	26.6	4th
Jesus Luz	9.6	9.0	9.0	27.6	2nd
Jacaré	9.7	9.0	8.8	27.5	3rd
Rodrigo Simas	9.6	9.0	9.2	27.8	1st
Tande	9.0	9.0	8.4	26.4	Out

=== Week 6 ===
Round 3 – Women

Aired: May 16, 2015

- Celebrity guest judge: Flávio Canto

Running order

7.5 metre platform
Contestant	Scores			Total points	Result
Contestant	Guest	Roberto	Eduardo	Total points	Result
Ana Carolina Dias	9.4	9.1	9.0	27.5	5th
Érika Januza	9.6	9.2	9.0	27.8	4th
Carol Nakamura	9.4	9.0	8.8	27.2	Out
Gracyanne Barbosa	9.7	9.2	9.0	27.9	2nd
Thaeme	9.4	9.3	9.2	27.9	2nd
Priscila Fantin	9.9	9.7	9.7	29.3	1st

=== Week 7 ===
Round 4 – Men

Aired: May 23, 2015

- Celebrity guest judge: Marcos Pasquim

Running order

5 metre platform synchronized
Contestant (Professional partner)	Scores			Total points	Result
Contestant (Professional partner)	Guest	Roberto	Eduardo	Total points	Result
Jacaré (Ian Matos)	10	9.9	9.9	29.8	Dive off
Jesus Luz (Renato Leite)	10	9.9	10	29.9	1st
Rodrigo Simas (Luiz Outerelo)	10	9.9	10	29.9	1st
Leandro Lima (Nicole Cruz)	10	9.9	9.9	29.8	Dive off

Dive-off

5 metre platform
Contestant	Scores			Total points	Result
Contestant	Guest	Roberto	Eduardo	Total points	Result
Jacaré	10	9.9	9.9	29.8	Win
Leandro Lima	9.9	9.8	9.8	29.5	Out

=== Week 8 ===
Round 4 – Women

Aired: May 30, 2015

- Celebrity guest judge: Felipe Andreoli

Running order

5 metre platform synchronized
Contestant (Professional partner)	Scores			Total points	Result
Contestant (Professional partner)	Guest	Roberto	Eduardo	Total points	Result
Thaeme (Tammy Takagi)	9.3	9.3	9.0	27.6	3rd
Ana Carolina Dias (Ingrid de Oliveira)	9.5	9.4	9.2	28.1	2nd
Érika Januza (Natali Cruz)	9.4	9.0	8.8	27.2	4th
Priscila Fantin (Juliana Veloso)	10	10	10	30.0	1st
Gracyanne Barbosa (Ana Paula Shalders)	9.3	8.8	8.8	26.9	Out

=== Week 9 ===
Round 5 – Women

Aired: June 13, 2015

- Celebrity guest judge: Thiago Martins

Running order

Free choice
Contestant (Dive height)	Scores			Dive points	Result (Total points)
Contestant (Dive height)	Guest	Roberto	Eduardo	Dive points	Result (Total points)
Dive 1
Ana Carolina Dias (5 metre platform)	9.9	9.3	9.0	28.2	1st
Érika Januza (5 metre platform)	9.5	9.0	8.8	27.3	3rd
Priscila Fantin (3 metre springboard)	9.3	8.8	8.8	26.9	4th
Thaeme (7.5 metre platform)	9.6	9.2	9.2	28.0	2nd
Dive 2
Ana Carolina Dias (3 metre springboard)	8.6	8.2	8.0	24.8	Out (53.0)
Thaeme (5 metre platform)	8.8	8.6	8.4	25.8	Finalist (53.8)
Érika Januza (3 metre springboard)	8.6	8.0	8.2	24.6	Out (52.1)
Priscila Fantin (5 metre platform)	10	10	10	30.0	Finalist (56.9)

=== Week 10 ===
Round 5 – Men

Aired: June 20, 2015

- Celebrity guest judge: Thiago Martins

Running order

Free choice
Contestant (Dive height)	Scores			Dive points	Result (Total points)
Contestant (Dive height)	Guest	Roberto	Eduardo	Dive points	Result (Total points)
Dive 1
Rodrigo Simas (3 metre springboard)	10	10	10	30.0	1st
Jacaré (7.5 metre platform)	10	9.9	9.8	29.7	2nd
Jesus Luz (7.5 metre platform)	9.9	9.3	9.5	28.7	3rd
Dive 2
Rodrigo Simas (7.5 metre platform)	10	9.8	9.9	29.7	Finalist (59.7)
Jacaré (5 metre platform)	9.8	9.5	9.6	28.9	Finalist (58.6)
Jesus Luz (5 metre platform)	10	9.1	9.2	28.3	Out (57.0)

=== Week 11: Final ===
Round 6 – Men & Women's final

Aired: June 27, 2015

- Celebrity guest judge: Luana Piovani

Running order

Free choice & 10 metre platform
Contestant (Dive height)	Scores			Dive points	Result (Total points)
Contestant (Dive height)	Guest	Roberto	Eduardo	Dive points	Result (Total points)
Dive 1 (Women)
Priscila Fantin (7.5 metre platform)	10	10	10	30.0	1st
Thaeme (5 metre platform)	8.0	9.0	8.6	25.6	2nd
Dive 1 (Men)
Rodrigo Simas (7.5 metre platform)	10	10	10	30.0	1st
Jacaré (10 metre platform)	9.5	9.7	9.8	29.0	2nd
Dive 2 (Women)
Thaeme (10 metre platform)	9.0	9.8	9.8	28.6	Runner-up (54.2)
Priscila Fantin (10 metre platform)	10	10	10	30.0	Winner (60.0)
Dive 2 (Men)
Rodrigo Simas (10 metre platform)	10	10	10	30.0	Winner (60.0)
Jacaré (10 metre platform)	10	10	10	30.0	Runner-up (59.0)
