= MIT Educational Studies Program =

The Educational Studies Program (ESP) is a student-run academic club in the Massachusetts Institute of Technology (MIT). It is known for operating many educational programs for the local high school and middle school community in the Boston area. The ESP office is in the fourth floor of the Stratton Student Center.

== History ==
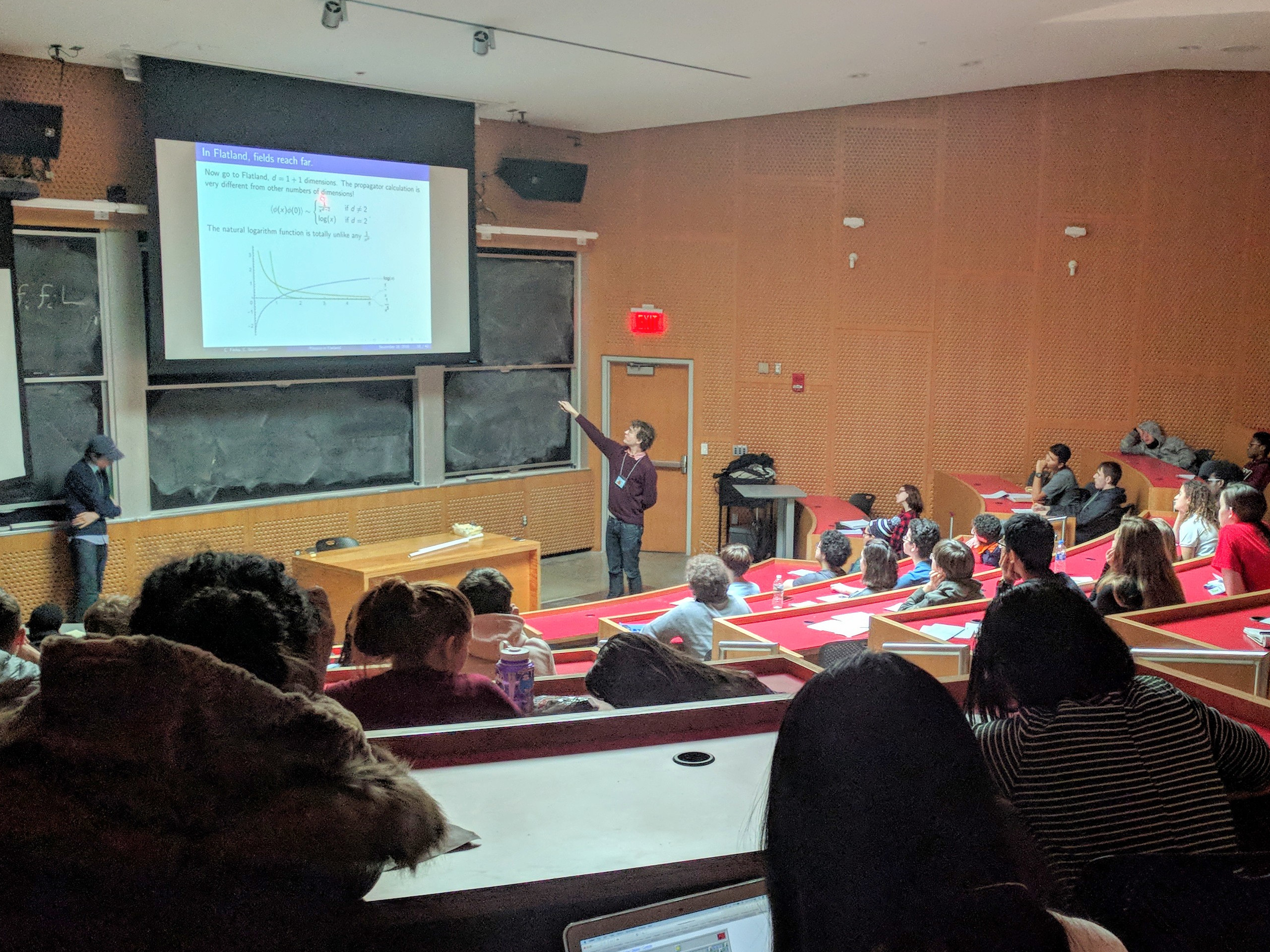
Splash 2018 Lecture on "Quantum Physics in Flatland"

The MIT Educational Studies Program was established in 1957; in that same year, it started running the Summer Studies Program (SSP), known as the High School Studies Program (HSSP) since 1967. SSP originally provided college freshman level classes in more traditionally academic subjects like math and science. By 1969, HSSP grew to attract over 1300 students and 130 instructors, with diverse topics like Iverson Language.

Their "largest annual teaching and learning extravaganza", Splash, first ran in 1988 with over 130 students, 22 teachers, and classes in topics like the biology of the AIDS virus and vector manipulation. By 2008, these numbers grew to over 2000 students, 300 teachers, and 400 classes.

In 2007, MIT ESP alumni founded Learning Unlimited, a nonprofit organization whose goal is to "make educational opportunities more readily available for all students." Since then, Learning Unlimited has supported the creation of Splash programs at other colleges like Yale, and Stanford.

Due to the COVID-19 pandemic, programs from Summer HSSP 2020 to Summer HSSP 2022 were moved to a virtual format, including Splash 2020. Their first program after Covid to return to in-person was Splash 2022, running from November 19 to November 20, 2022.

== Programs ==
=== Splash ===
Splash is an event where MIT students and staff conduct classes on various topics for high school students in the Boston area. It is completely run by student volunteers. Classes usually last between an hour and three hours long and are very diverse. Examples of past classes include

- Introduction to Zombie Defense
- Counting Infinity
- The Physics of Fairy Tales

Classes range from fun filled to academically challenging ones.

Splash usually runs over a weekend in the Fall. In Splash 2019, more than two thousand students were registered with more than five hundred classes.

Splash was first conducted in 1988. In order to help conduct Splash events in other schools throughout the country, ESP alumni who had been involved in Splash at MIT founded Learning Unlimited in 2007. Learning Unlimited has helped in the creation of more than twenty similar programs in various schools. Splash was conducted for both high school and middle school students until 2013, when the program was split. Spark now handled middle school students, and Splash was only for high school students. Due to disruption caused by the COVID-19 pandemic, Splash 2020 was conducted virtually. Around 500 students attended the program with over 200 classes being taught.

The program usually costs around 40 dollars but generous need based financial aid is available upon request. Students submit preferences for classes and a lottery system is used to allot classes to students. A student is allowed to attend as many classes as fits their schedule. Walk in activities and classes are organized. These classes can be attended without prior registration.

A famous personality who taught at Splash includes Randall Munroe, the creator of the webcomic xkcd. He wrote the book What If? after being inspired while taking a class at Splash.

=== Spark ===
Spark is an event where MIT students and staff conduct classes on various topics for middle school students in the Boston area. It is completely run by student volunteers. Classes usually last between an hour and three hours long and are very diverse.

Examples of past classes include:

- Intro to JavaScript
- How to Build a Solar Car
- Good and Evil in Superhero Comics

Classes range from fun filled to academically challenging ones. Spark usually runs over a weekend in the Spring. The program usually costs around 40 dollars but generous need-based financial aid is available upon request. Students submit preferences for classes and a lottery system is used to allot classes to students. A student is allowed to attend as many classes as fits their schedule. Walk in activities and classes are organized. These classes can be attended without prior registration.

Spark was first conducted in 2008, but only started to be targeted towards middle schoolers in the 2013–2014 academic year.

=== HSSP ===
The High School Studies Program (HSSP) is a multi-weekend program run by ESP for students in the Boston community. HSSP is run two times in the academic year, over the spring and the summer. HSSP is ESP's first program and has been running since 1957. It runs over 6–8 weeks. Both high schoolers and middle schoolers are invited to apply to this program.

The program usually costs around 40 dollars but financial aid is available upon request.

=== Firehose/Firestorm ===
Firehose and Firestorm are rapid-fire learning events held at MIT. There are many five minute classes on various things held by MIT students. Firehose and Firestorm are similar events but held at different times: Firehose runs during CPW (Campus Preview Weekend) for prospective MIT Students, while Firestorm runs during Orientation week.

=== Cascade ===
Cascade is a multi-weekend program run by ESP aimed towards high school students in the Boston area. It usually lasts about 5 to 6 weekends and students take a few classes every weekend. Students are also offered mentorship by ESP members through this program. Cascade is free for students. Students are selected from schools and communities in the Greater Boston area that ESP partners with. Cascade usually runs in the Fall.

== Retired programs ==
Throughout its years of operation, ESP has launched several programs that are no longer active like Junction and SATprep.

- Junction was an intense non-residential summer program, with students going to the MIT Campus every weekend. Students would submit a proposal for an independent study project and they would be assigned mentors to guide them. It was last run on Summer 2017.
- In 1994, ESP launched a new residential summer program, MESH, a summer program where high school students learned and taught a variety of AP-level courses. It was short-lived, only being run until 1998.
- Like its name suggests, SATPrep was an SAT preparation program. It was conceived in 1985 as an affordable alternative to professional vendors. It was discontinued in 2011, and it has since been picked up by the MIT Academic Teaching Initiative.
