= Além do Horizonte =

Brazilian telenovela

- Genre: Adventure
- Created by: Carlos Gregório; Marcos Bernstein
- Directed by: Gustavo Fernandez; Ricardo Waddington
- Starring: Juliana Paiva; Thiago Rodrigues; Alexandre Nero; Rodrigo Simas see more
- Opening theme: Além do Horizonte by Erasmo Carlos
- Country of origin: Brazil
- Original language: Portuguese
- No. of episodes: 155

Production
- Production location: Brazil
- Running time: 60 minutes

Original release
- Network: Globo
- Release: 4 November 2013 – 2 May 2014

Além do Horizonte (English: Beyond the Horizon) is a Brazilian telenovela created by Carlos Gregório and Marcos Bernstein. It was produced and broadcast by Globo.

The telenovela features an ensemble cast headed by Juliana Paiva, Thiago Rodrigues, Antônio Calloni, Rodrigo Simas, Mariana Rios, Sheron Menezzes, Flávia Alessandra, Alexandre Borges, Marcello Novaes, Cássio Gabus Mendes and special participation by Alexandre Nero.

== Plot ==
Lili (Juliana Paiva), Rafa (Vinicius Redd) and William (Thiago Rodrigues) are willing to explore a new world. In search of loved ones who have disappeared without explanation, these three young people get to know each other and, together, discover that one has to go far beyond the horizon to unravel the mysteries that surround their families. In this journey, they intend to find the father of Lili, Luis Carlos (Antonio Calloni); the aunt and brother of William, Tereza (Carolina Ferraz) and Marlon (Rodrigo Simas); and Rafa's girlfriend, Paulinha (Christiana Ubach). The clues they leave suggest that there is a place, far away, where life can be full and transforming.

Lili (Juliana Paiva) lives with her mother, Heloísa (Flávia Alessandra) since her father, Luís Carlos, the LC (Antonio Calloni), left the family, saying that she needed to go after full and concrete happiness. His disappearance was a mystery investigated by the delegate André (Caco Ciocler), but the case was terminated and LC given as dead. Ten years later, Lili discovers that her father left her a letter to her in the will, revealing she may be alive. He also advises her to go after happiness. From there, she decides to go after the truth and ends up discovering that he ran away with a lover, Tereza (Carolina Ferraz).

William (Thiago Rodrigues) lives with his brother Marlon (Rodrigo Simas) and Aunt Sandra (Karen Coelho). His parents died in a car accident, and he was raised by his aunt Tereza (Carolina Ferraz), but she disappeared and left her nephews in the care of her sister, Sandra, who had to take care of them even though she was very young. Since then, William has also begun to work hard and has devoted himself to studies. But he did not get a job and gets money by selling college jobs for college students. One day, Marlon disappears with family money and leaves a message stating that he was after happiness, just like Aunt Tereza. William gets desperate and decides to go look for his brother. [lack of sources] Rafa (Vinícius Redd) lives with his father Flavio (Guilherme Fontes) and Júlia (Marcella Valente), but he misses his deceased mother. She is a boyfriend of Paulinha (Christiana Ubach), but she realizes that he does not take risks, he prefers to live life without danger. So. Paulinha decides to go after the happiness and also disappears, leaving recorded in a pen drive a video, counting its reasons and it advises to go after her. From there, Rafa ends up meeting a secret entity, the Group, where he brings together people who are in search of full and concrete happiness.

Thomaz (Alexandre Borges) is a successful lawyer and married to Inês (Maria Luísa Mendonça) and father of Marcelo (Igor Angelkorte), Lili's fiancé. Thomas was LC's best friend before he disappeared, and he was always in love with Heloise.

The Group is led by Líder Jorge (Cássio Gabus Mendes), who gives several lectures and creates an illusion in people, saying that, beyond the horizon, there is a place where everyone is happy, the so-called Community, which lies in the middle of the Amazon Rainforest, isolated from the rest of the world. LC, Tereza, Marlon, Paulinha and several other people end up going to the community. The beginners, little by little, discover that not everyone is happy, and want to find out how all the equipment will stop at that end of the world. The so-called Luminous Master is the great head of the Community, and wants, at all costs, that nobody knows the existence of the place. What no one knows is that the master is Hermes (Alexandre Nero) who can become a completely violent person to hide his community.

The community is situated near the village of Tapiré, which is commanded by Kléber (Marcello Novaes) sends rain from the place married to Keila (Sheron Menezzes). The arrival of the teacher Celina (Mariana Rios) to the village takes away the sleep of Kléber, that of face it is disagreed with the teacher, and its secrets are by a thread to be discovered. Ana Fátima (Yanna Lavigne), Ana Selma (Luciana Paes) and Ana Rita (Mariana Xavier) after death are also living in Tapiré, also Vó Tita (Analu Prestes), a lady who knows how to use all the medicinal herbs in the forest. of his daughter Ana Rosa. The death of Rosa has always been a mystery to the residents of Tapiré. She spent a long time disappearing and appeared, dead, floating in the river and with scratches of sharp claws in the face. From there, several other bodies were beginning to appear in the village, and a legend took over Tapiré. A monster supposedly inhabits areas that are beyond the edge of the forest and attacks all who cross it, and always leaves its mark on the face of the victim. The monster is the Beast. From time to time, there are a few blackouts in Tapiré, and the Ghost Garimpeiro captures the people who walk through the city during the blackout and takes them to the Beast. Of face, Celina soon realizes that everything is only illusion of the tapirenses, and decides to investigate, when it finishes of face.

== Cast ==
Actor / Actress	Character(s)
Juliana Paiva	Alice Leite Barcelos (Lili)
Thiago Rodrigues	William Guimarães
Rodrigo Simas	Marlon Guimarães
Alexandre Nero	Hermes
Christiana Ubach	Paula Vargas (Paulinha)
Carolina Ferraz	Maria Tereza Guimarães
Caco Ciocler	André Teixeira
Mariana Rios	Celina Machado
Sheron Menezzes	Keila Machado de Lima
Maria Luísa Mendonça	Inês Mendonça Vilar
Igor Angelkorte	Marcelo Vilar
Yanna Lavigne	Ana Fátima
Laila Zaid	Priscila Leite
Guilherme Fontes	Flávio Andrade
Karen Coelho	Sandra de Sousa da Silva Araújo
Analu Prestes	Tita
Isaac Bardavid	Klaus
Marcella Valente	Júlia Andrade
Antônio Calloni	Luís Carlos Barcelos (L.C.)
Flávia Alessandra	Heloísa Leite Barcelos
Alexandre Borges	Thomáz Vilar
Marcello Novaes	Kléber Lima
Vinicius Tardio	Rafael Andrade (Rafa)
JP Rufino	Edmílson/Edilemilson (Nilson)
Cássio Gabus Mendes	Líder Jorge
Marina Palha	Joana
Letícia Colin	Vitória
Cláudia Jimenez	Zélia
Sabrina Greve	Dra. Angelique
Day Mesquita	Fernanda
Rômulo Estrela	Álvaro
Mariana Xavier	Ana Rita
Luciana Paes	Ana Selma
Diego Homci	João
Tiago Homci	José
Lucas Salles	Gustavo (Guto)
Jacqueline Sato	Jéssica (Jessie Tatoo)
Fernanda Vianna	Berenice
Cristine Peron	Olívia Sampaio Teixeira
João Camargo	Osvaldo
Otávio Martins	Cacá
Ravel Cabral	Assis
Begê Muniz	Matias
Daniel Ribeiro	Eduardo
Eliseu Paranhos	Romildo
Luma Ferreira	Belinha
Marcelo Mariano	Edinésio
Lucas Simões	Guilherme
Nathalia Alvim	Daniela
Simon Petracchi	Wolfgang
Celso Reeks	Dr. Breno
Narcival Rubens	Pedrosa

== Soundtrack ==
1. "Além do Horizonte" – Erasmo Carlos
2. "Na Linha do Tempo" – Victor & Leo
3. "Zen" – Anitta
4. "Se Tudo Fosse Fácil" – Paula Fernandes
5. "Perto de Mim" – Thaeme & Thiago
6. "O Que Eu Só Vejo em Você" – Nando Reis
7. "Seen It All" – Jake Bugg
8. "Dançando no Salão" – Gang do Eletro
9. "O Amor Verdadeiro Não Tem Vista Para O Mar" – Pullovers
10. "Magra" – Lenine
11. "Cada Qualidade De Homem" – Tanga da Sereia
12. "Somente Nela" – Paulinho Moska
13. "Meu Sol" – Vanguart
14. "Safe Rock" – Cambriana
15. "Take The Money And Run Away To Rio" – Brothers of Brasil
