= Splash (otter) =

Asian small-clawed otter (born 2023)

- Species: Aonyx cinereus
- Sex: Male
- Born: 2023 (age 2–3): Wildlife World Zoo; Litchfield Park, Arizona
- Known for: Search and rescue operations
- Owner: Michael Hadsell
- Residence: Englewood, Florida

Splash is an Asian small-clawed otter trained in search and rescue techniques. With an otter's ability to detect scents underwater, he has been used by the Martin County's Sheriff Office to dive and find unrecovered bodies in Florida waterways. According to several news sources, Splash was the first otter in the United States trained in search and rescue.

== Background ==
Michael Hadsell trains and prepares animals to perform search and rescue functions at the Peace River K9 Search and Rescue facility located in Englewood, Florida. Hadsell, who has been a forensic diver since 2016, had learned about otters' ability to be trained in fishing by detecting underwater odors. Otters detect scents underwater by blowing bubbles and quickly re-inhaling them; the inhaled bubbles absorb odors from the surrounding water. In 2019, he did preliminary tests with an otter at a local aquarium and then more training with two river otters purchased through a retailer of exotic pets.

== Training ==
Splash was born in Litchfield Park, Arizona at Wildlife World Zoo. At four months of age, he was donated to Hadsell for training.

Hadsell trained Splash in his home swimming pool. He would hide objects in the pool marked with the scent of human remains and place the same scent on a ball. When he said a code word, Splash was trained to sniff the ball, dive into the water and seek out the matching scent on the hidden object in the pool. He was rewarded for matching the scent with a piece of farmed salmon. Splash trained for four months before participating in his first recovery operation in Alabama, where he helped find a weapon used in a 25-year-old murder case.

== Recovery career ==
By October 2025, Splash had participated in 20 additional recovery missions and made four recoveries of human remains. Hadsell adapted his training to include sending messages through tugs on a string tied to Splash in addition to verbal cues.

According to Hadsell, Splash is expected to be able to work until age 10. Significant hazards for his work in recovery include alligators. Due to demand from investigative agencies in Florida, where up to two people go missing underwater each year in Martin County alone, Hadsell has begun training another otter in recovery techniques.

== Media coverage ==
Splash was featured by Tampa TV station WTSP in May 2025, a story that promoted search and rescue otters as a potential solution to cold cases and that was aggregated by news outlets worldwide.

== See also ==
- Search and rescue dog
