= Rory Bushfield =

Canadian extreme skier

Personal information
- Nickname: Bushywayne
- Born: May 30, 1983 (age 43) Balzac, Alberta, Canada
- Spouse: Sarah Burke (2010–2012; her death)

Sport
- Sport: Mogul skiing, Slopestyle, backcountry

Rory Bushfield (born May 30, 1983) is a Canadian professional skier, filmmaker, and reality show star.

Bushfield is a former member of Canada's World Cup team, skiing moguls. He has also competed in slopestyle skiing before focusing on backcountry skiing and filmmaking.

Bushfield was a contestant on the reality diving competition Splash beginning in March 2013. He won the competition, defeating Nicole Eggert, on May 7, 2013.

== Personal life ==
Bushfield and fellow freeskier Sarah Burke were married in Pemberton, British Columbia on September 25, 2010. Burke was a five-time gold medalist at the Winter X Games and won the world championship in halfpipe in 2005. She died after a training accident in Utah on January 19, 2012. He started the Sarah Burke Foundation in her memory.

Bushfield lives in Squamish, British Columbia with his dogs and girlfriend, Stacey Paradine. He was paralyzed in a car accident in 2024. He is also a single-engine pilot.

== Filmography ==
- Strike Three – Level 1 2002
- Forward – Level 1 2003
- Yearbook – Matchstick Productions 2004
- The Hit List – Matchstick Productions 2005
- Push – Matchstick Productions 2006
- Seven Sunny Days – Matchstick Productions 2007
- Claim – Matchstick Productions 2008
- In Deep – Matchstick Productions 2009
- The Way I See It – Matchstick Productions 2010
- One for the Road – Teton Gravity Research 2011
- Attack of La Niña – Matchstick Productions 2011
- All.I.Can. – Sherpa 2011
- Super Heroes of Stoke – Matchstick Productions 2012
- The Dream Factory – Teton Gravity Research 2012
- Into The Mind – Sherpas Cinema 2013
- The Crash Reel - Documentary by Julian Cautherley & Lucy Walker 2013
