= Jacaré (dancer) =

Brazilian dancer and actor

Edson Gomes Cardoso Santos, born on July 21, 1972 (age 53), in Salvador, Bahia, nicknamed Jacaré, is a Brazilian dancer and Actor.

Cardoso, a performer to musical genres of pagode and samba reggae, is foremost known for his membership in the popular É o Tchan!. In later years, he assorted his artistic life by acting in comedies shows A Turma do Didi and Aventuras do Didi of Rede Globo that star Renato Aragão. Currently Santos lives in Canada
