= Splash (South Korean TV series) =

South Korean reality television series

Splash (Korean: 스플래시; tag lined Star Diving Show (Korean: 스타 다이빙 쇼)) is a short-lived South Korean reality television series produced by SM C&C and broadcast in 2013 on MBC, based on the Celebrity Splash! format created by Dutch company Eyeworks. The show was pre-recorded. After four episodes, the show was cancelled after several celebrities were injured.
