= Splash (academic outreach program) =

Academic outreach program organized by university students

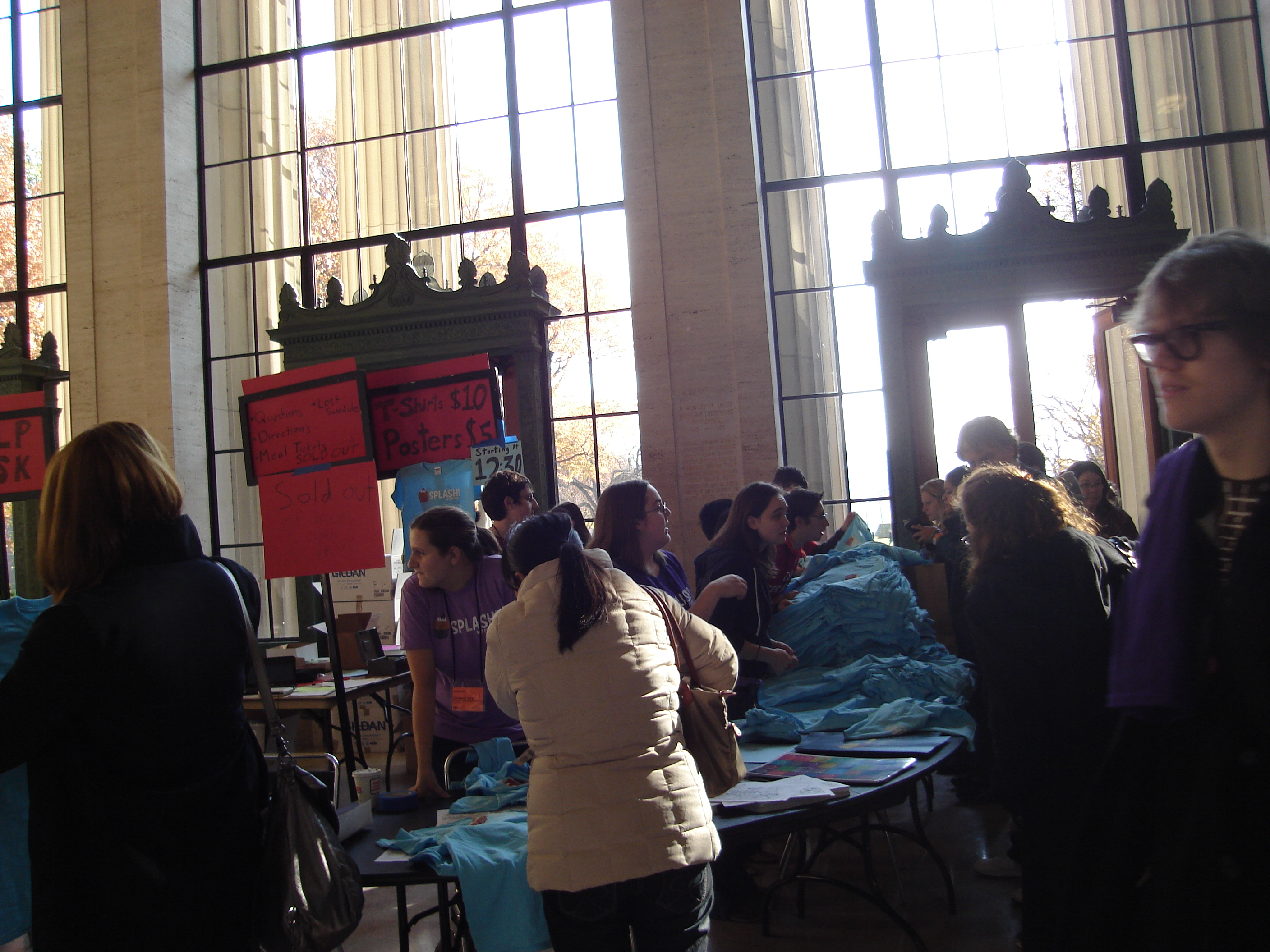
Help desk - Splash 2012 at MIT

Splash (sometimes stylized as Splash!) is a yearly academic outreach program by many universities that invites high school students to attend classes created and taught by students, alumni, and local community members. Splash was originated in 1988 by MIT's student-run Educational Studies Program (ESP). Today, most Splash programs are affiliated with and coordinated by Learning Unlimited.

== Format ==
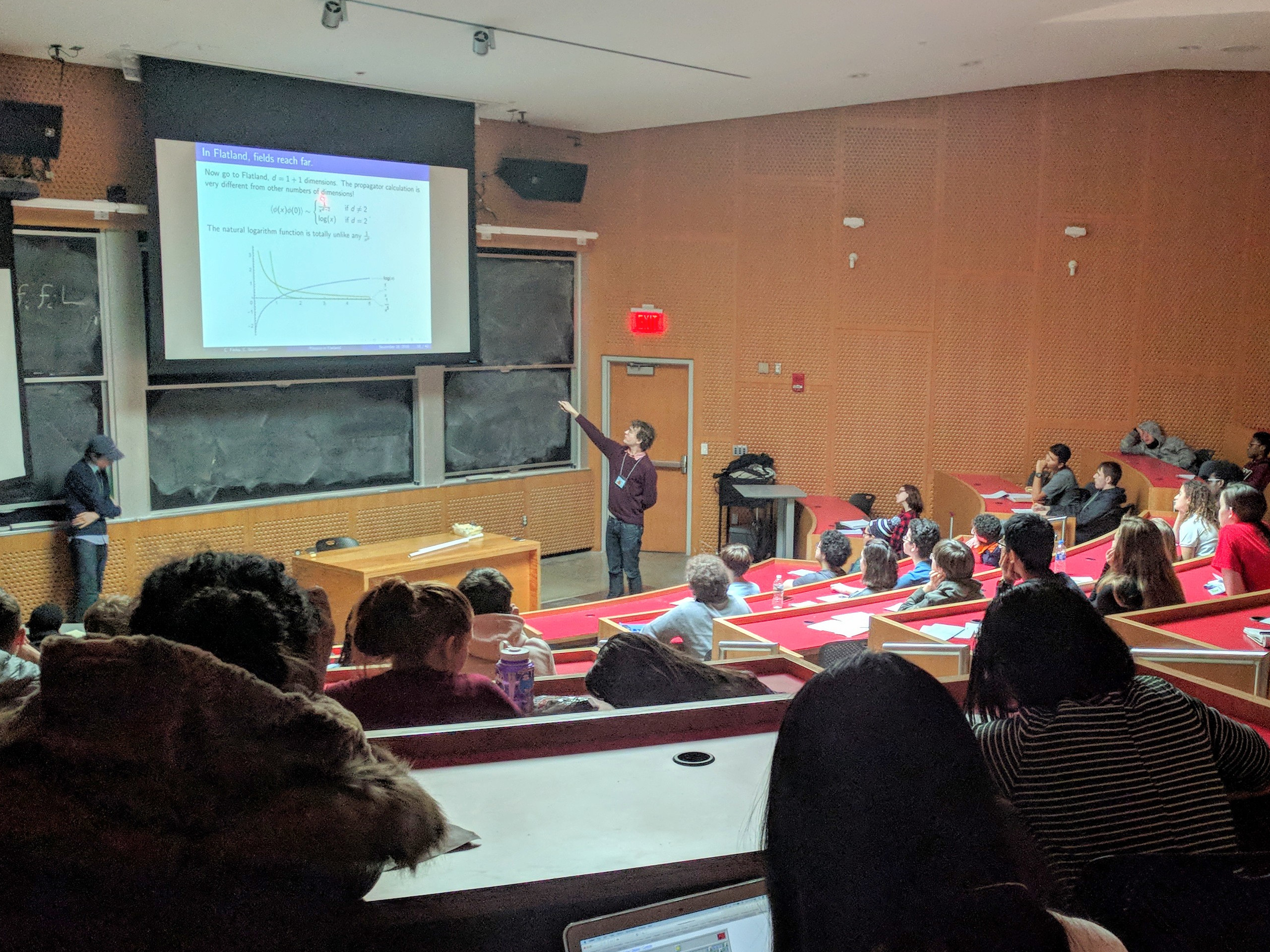
Christian Ferko and Colin Nancarrow teach a class called "Quantum Physics in Flatland" to high school students at MIT ESP Splash 2018.

Splash sessions typically span two days on a weekend, with individual classes generally one or two hours long. Class topics are chosen by the instructors and range from discussions and interactive projects to intense academic seminars. Splash emphasizes having a diverse range of class topics, covering a variety of academic fields as well as non-academic games and practical skills. Student attendees are encouraged to take as many classes as they would like.

Larger Splash programs, such as those organized by MIT ESP, involve over two thousand teachers and five hundred classes. Subsequently, MIT Splash has grown in popularity and attracted students from well beyond its local area. To support Splash at other universities and expand student access to educational opportunities, ESP alumni founded Learning Unlimited in 2007. The nonprofit organization provides assistance, including mentorship and software support, that helps new Splash programs start successfully.

== Locations ==
As of 2020, Splash programs are held at several universities in the US and elsewhere.

=== Northeastern United States ===
- Boston College
- Brandeis University
- Clark University
- Columbia University
- Cornell University
- Harvard University
- Massachusetts Institute of Technology
- Northeastern University
- University of Rochester
- Yale University

=== Midwestern United States ===
- University of Chicago
- Northwestern University
- University of Illinois at Urbana–Champaign

=== Mid-Atlantic United States ===
- Johns Hopkins University
- Princeton University

=== Southern United States ===
- Emory University

=== Western United States ===
- University of California, Berkeley
- Granite Hills High School (El Cajon, California)
- Stanford University
- University of California, Los Angeles
