= Splash (American TV series) =

2013 reality television series

- Genre: Reality
- Directed by: Rich DiPirro
- Presented by: Joey Lawrence; Charissa Thompson
- Starring: Greg Louganis
- Judges: Steve Foley; David Boudia
- Music by: Jingle Punks
- Country of origin: United States
- No. of seasons: 1
- No. of episodes: 8

Production
- Executive producers: Brant Pinvidic; J.D. Roth; Josh Greenberg; Todd A. Nelson
- Producers: Adam Bollinger; Dave West
- Production location: Riverside City College
- Editors: Jennifer Kim Nagakawa; Andrew Yuncken
- Running time: 42-44 minutes
- Production company: Eyeworks USA

Original release
- Network: ABC
- Release: March 19 – May 7, 2013

Related
- Celebrity Splash!

Splash is an American reality sports competition series, featuring celebrities training for and executing diving skills, broadcast on ABC, based on the Celebrity Splash! format created by Dutch company Eyeworks. It premiered on March 19, 2013. Steve Foley and David Boudia are judges while Greg Louganis mentored the competitors.

== Production history ==
The series was first mentioned on October 5, 2012, when it was announced that ABC ordered what was called Celebrity Splash straight to series. Based on the Dutch series of the same name, it has celebrities perform dives from extreme heights and each week the challenges increase in difficulty.

Eight out of ten of the cast were revealed on January 25, 2013, which is also when the series changed its name to its current title of Splash. The two unrevealed cast members were revealed on February 4, 2013. The final two to be revealed were Nicole Eggert and Rory Bushfield. The hosts for season one have been Joey Lawrence and Charissa Thompson.

Season 1 was filmed at the Riverside Aquatics Complex on the campus of Riverside City College.

In 2023, professional wrestler Chris Jericho said in an interview with “Inside the Ropes” that he was asked to take part in the show but ultimately declined.

== Cast ==
Celebrity	Occupation / known for	Status
Keshia Knight Pulliam	Actress; The Cosby Show	Eliminated 1st on March 19, 2013
Chuy Bravo	Sidekick of Chelsea Handler; Chelsea Lately	Withdrew on March 26, 2013
Ndamukong Suh	NFL defensive lineman Detroit Lions	Eliminated 2nd on March 26, 2013
Kendra Wilkinson	Reality TV star Former girlfriend of Hugh Hefner	Withdrew on April 2, 2013
Katherine Webb	Miss Alabama USA 2012; Girlfriend of A. J. McCarron	Withdrew on April 16, 2013
Louie Anderson	TV host and comedian Family Feud	Withdrew on April 16, 2013
Kareem Abdul-Jabbar	NBA champion NBA's 2nd all-time leading scorer	Eliminated 3rd on April 23, 2013
Brandi Chastain	FIFA Women's World Cup Champion; Replaced Chuy Bravo, Week 2	Eliminated 4th on April 30, 2013
Drake Bell	Actor/singer-songwriter; Nickelodeon's Drake & Josh	Third place on May 7, 2013
Nicole Eggert	Actress; Baywatch	Runner-up on May 7, 2013
Rory Bushfield	Extreme skier member of Nitro Circus Live	Winner on May 7, 2013

== Injuries ==
- On March 26, 2013 (week two), Chuy Bravo withdrew the competition with an injury to his heel. Brandi Chastain replaced Bravo after the injury.
- Rory Bushfield suffered a ruptured eardrum in practice in Week 3. He had to go to four doctors before one would clear him to continue.
- Katherine Webb suffered a back injury and withdrew from the show.
- Reportedly Nicole Eggert was injured in the third week of April during a taping of the show.
- During rehearsal for episode six of the show, Drake Bell attempted a dive he had not practiced and got a concussion and two black eyes.
- Nicole Eggert fell on her back during her final dive on May 7. She was okay, but ended up losing to Rory Bushfield.

== Scoring chart ==
Celebrity	Place	Wk 1	Wk 2	Wk 3	Wk 4	Wk 5	Wk 6	Wk 7	Wk 8
Rory Bushfield	1	8.00			7.25	8.75	8.00	8.75	9.25
Nicole Eggert	2		7.75	6.75	8.25	8.50	8.25	7.25	8.50
Drake Bell	3		7.75	9.25	6.25	7.75	7.00	5.75	7.00
Brandi Chastain	4		7.00	6.75	6.25	4.75	9.75	3.25	
Kareem Abdul-Jabbar	5	7.25		5.75	6.25	7.25	7.25		
Louie Anderson	6	7.25		5.75	5.75	7.25			
Katherine Webb	7	6.75		9.25	6.00	WD			
Kendra Wilkinson	8		7.75	WD					
Ndamukong Suh	9		6.75						
Chuy Bravo	10		WD						
Keisha Knight Pulliam	11	6.00							

Red numbers indicate the lowest score for each week
Green numbers indicate the highest score for each week
The diver won the competition.
The diver received second place in the competition.
The diver received third place in the competition.
The diver received first place that week, when audience scores were added in.
The diver was eliminated that week.
The diver was in the bottom two and competed in the dive-off.
The diver withdrew from the competition.
The diver did not dive that week.
The contestant was not on the show at this time.
The contestant was re-instated into the competition and withdrew in the same episode.

=== Averages ===
Rank by average	Place	Celebrity	Total points	Number of dives	Average
1	1	Rory Bushfield	50.00	6	8.33
2	2	Nicole Eggert	55.25	7	7.89
3	8	Kendra Wilkinson	7.75	1	7.75
4	7	Katherine Webb	22.00	3	7.33
5	3	Drake Bell	50.75	7	7.29
6	5	Kareem Abdul-Jabbar	33.75	5	6.85
7	9	Ndamukong Suh	6.75	1	6.75
8	6	Louie Anderson	26.00	4	6.50
9	4	Brandi Chastain	37.75	6	6.29
10	10	Keshia Knight Pulliam	6.00	1	6.00

== Live show details ==
=== Week 1 ===
Running order

Celebrity	Scores			Result
Celebrity	Boudia	Foley	Average	Result
Keisha Knight Pulliam	6.00	6.00	6.00	Eliminated
Louie Anderson	7.50	7.00	7.25	Safe
Katherine Webb	7.00	6.50	6.75	Bottom two
Rory Bushfield	8.50	7.50	8.00	Safe _{(First Place)}
Kareem Abdul-Jabbar	7.50	7.00	7.25	Safe

=== Week 2 ===
Running order

Celebrity	Scores			Result
Celebrity	Boudia	Foley	Average	Result
Brandi Chastain	8.00	6.00	7.00	Bottom two
Drake Bell	7.50	8.00	7.75	Safe
Nicole Eggert	7.50	8.00	7.75	Safe (First Place)
Ndamukong Suh	7.00	6.50	6.75	Eliminated
Kendra Wilkinson	8.50	7.00	7.75	Safe
Chuy Bravo	N/A	N/A	N/A	Withdrew, replaced by Brandi Chastain

=== Week 3 ===
Running order

The challenge this week was to do a dive with a partner. Kendra Wilkinson withdrew from the competition for personal reasons prior to Week 4's start. She was taped for Week 3 preparing for the dive, but she didn't dive in the live show, thus eliminating her directly.

Celebrity	Scores			Result
Celebrity	Boudia	Foley	Average	Result
Kareem & Louie	6.00	5.50	5.75	Bottom two
Nicole & Brandi	7.00	6.50	6.75	Safe
Drake & Katherine	10.00	8.50	9.25	Safe (First Place)
Kendra & Rory	N/A	N/A	N/A	Withdrew (Kendra)

=== Week 4 ===
Running order

The challenge this week was to do a flip.

Celebrity	Scores			Result
Celebrity	Boudia	Foley	Average	Result
Kareem Abdul-Jabbar	6.00	6.50	6.25	Safe
Katherine Webb	6.00	6.00	6.00	Bottom two
Nicole Eggert	8.50	8.00	8.25	Safe (First Place)
Rory Bushfield	7.00	7.50	7.25	Safe
Drake Bell	6.50	6.00	6.25	Safe
Brandi Chastain	6.00	6.50	6.25	Safe
Louie Anderson	5.50	6.00	5.75	Eliminated

=== Week 5 ===
Running order

The challenge this week was to jump off the 10 meter platform.

Celebrity	Scores			Result
Celebrity	Boudia	Foley	Average	Result
Louie Anderson	7.50	7.00	7.25	Withdrew (in Bottom two)
Drake Bell	8.00	7.50	7.75	Safe
Brandi Chastain	5.00	4.50	4.75	Bottom two
Kareem Abdul-Jabaar	7.50	7.00	7.25	Safe
Nicole Eggert	9.00	8.00	8.50	Safe
Rory Bushfield	9.00	8.50	8.75	Safe _{(First Place)}
Katherine Webb	N/A	N/A	N/A	Withdrew, replaced by Louie Anderson

=== Week 6 ===
Running order

The challenge this week was to jump in synchronization with a junior diving champ.

Celebrity	Scores			Junior Diver	Result
Celebrity	Boudia	Foley	Average	Junior Diver	Result
Brandi Chastain	10.00	9.50	9.75	Daria	Safe _{(First Place)}
Kareem Abdul-Jabaar	7.50	7.00	7.25	Michelle	Eliminated
Rory Bushfield	8.00	8.00	8.00	Jake	Safe
Drake Bell	7.00	7.00	7.00	Luca	Bottom two
Nicole Eggert	8.00	8.50	8.25	Sofie	Safe

=== Week 7 ===
Running order

The challenge this week was for each diver to choose which board to jump from and be given their dive by Greg.

Celebrity	Scores			Result
Celebrity	Boudia	Foley	Average	Result
Drake Bell	5.50	6.00	5.75	Dive-off
Nicole Eggert	7.00	7.50	7.25	Dive-off
Brandi Chastain	3.50	3.00	3.25	Dive-off
Rory Bushfield	9.00	8.50	8.75	Safe _{(First Place)}
The Dive-off
Drake Bell	Saved	X		Safe
Nicole Eggert	X	Saved		Safe
Brandi Chastain	X	X		Eliminated

=== Week 8 ===
Running order

Celebrity	Scores			Result
Celebrity	Boudia	Foley	Average	Result
Nicole Eggert	8.50	8.50	8.50	Runner-Up
Rory Bushfield	9.50	9.00	9.25	Winner
Drake Bell	7.00	7.00	7.00	Third Place
