= Maíra Charken =

Brazilian actress (born 1978)

- Born: Maíra Charken Carneiro; 22 July 1978 (age 48); Amsterdam, Netherlands
- Years active: 1999–present
- Notable work: Vera Morgado in Babilônia

Maíra Charken Carneiro (born July 22, 1978) is a Dutch Brazilian actress, dancer, singer, TV host and comedian.

== Biography ==
Maíra Charken was born in Amsterdam, Netherlands. She went to Brazil at the age of two, where she settled with her family in Campinas, in the state of São Paulo.

Formed in Journalism by PUC-Campinas and Dance by Unicamp. It is part of the comedy group Deznecessários and was part of the musical group Blitz. Participated in the reality show Popstars of SBT, being among the finalists. He joined the cast of the telenovela Babilônia, of Rede Globo, playing the delegated Vera Morgado. From March 14, 2016, assumes as new host of the program Video Show instead of Joaquim Lopes replacing Monica Iozzi. In January 26, 2017, Maíra was fired from the broadcaster; in May of the same year, she launched a YouTube channel.

Maíra has a degree in journalism from the Pontifical Catholic University of Campinas (PUC). Married to athlete Renato Antunes since September 2017, and mother of little Gael.

== Filmography ==
=== Television ===
Year	Title	Role
1999	Domingão do Faustão	Dancer
2002	Popstars	Participant / Finalist
2006	Cobras & Lagartos	Mariana Venturini
2007	Dance Dance Dance	Sheila de Almeida
2007	A Turma do Didi	Vanessa
2008	Chamas da Vida	Emília Bocardio Villaroeal
2009	Louca Família	Anete Perez
2010	Louca Família	Maria das Graças Silva (Gracinha)
2010	Os Caras de Pau	Letícia
2011	Malhação	Vera Lúcia Souto (Verinha)
2015	Babilônia	Vera Morgado (Delegate Vera)
2016	Vídeo Show	TV host

=== Movies ===
- 2003 - Retratos da Vida (short film)
- 2009 - Drinks Desejos Desvios (short film)

== Theater ==
- 2001 - O Abobalhado
- 2004 - Evita Perón como Evita
- 2004 - Gatas Manhosas
- 2005 - O Manipulador
- 2005 - Sabor a Mi
- 2005 - Gardel
- 2007 - O Homem Ideal
- 2007 - O Musical dos Musicais
- 2008 - Nós Amamos
- 2014 - Elis a Musical

== Others ==
- Interview on Hebe of Hebe Camargo
- Participation on Teleton, of SBT
- Fixed comedy group cast Deznecessários
- Stand-Up in People&Arts channel
- Interview on Radiofobia podcast
