= Rodrigo Simas =

Brazilian actor (born 1992)

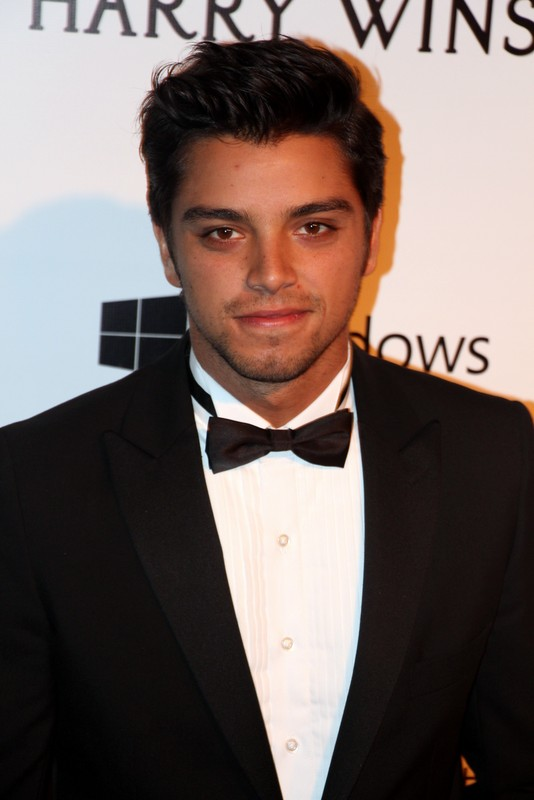
- Simas in 2015
- Born: Rodrigo Sang Simas; 6 January 1992 (age 34); Rio de Janeiro, Brazil
- Occupation: Actor
- Years active: 2007–present
- Father: Beto Simas
- Relatives: Felipe Simas (brother); Bruno Gissoni (half-brother)

Rodrigo Sang Simas (born 6 January 1992) is a Brazilian actor.

== Biography ==
Simas was born in Rio de Janeiro, the son of capoeirista Beto Simas and brother of the actors Bruno Gissoni and Felipe Simas.

Since 2018 he's been dating actress Agatha Moreira. On March 4, 2023 Simas came out as a bisexual man in an interview with the newspaper Extra: “I have never brought it up, but I am a bisexual man. It’s a label, but I feel mature and comfortable talking about it now.”

== Career ==
=== Filmography ===
Television
Year	Title	Role
2009	Poder Paralelo	Bruno Vilar Júnior
2010	Desenrola Aí	Gustavo Boomin
2011	Fina Estampa	Leandro dos Anjos
2012	Dança dos Famosos 9	Himself (contestant)
2012	Malhação	Bruno Menezes
2013	Além do Horizonte	Marlon Sampaio
2014	Boogie Oogie	Roberto Veiga Azevedo Fraga (Beto)
2015	Saltibum	Himself (contestant)
2015	Não se Apega Não	Cameo
2017	Novo Mundo	Piatã
2018	Orgulho e Paixão	Ernesto Pricelli
2019	Órfãos da Terra	Bruno Monte Castelli
2020	Salve-se Quem Puder	Alejandro
2021	Dança dos Famosos season 18	Himself (contestant)
2022	Cara e Coragem	Himself
2023	As Aventuras de José e Durval	José Lima Sobrinho "Chitãozinho"
2024	Renascer	José Venâncio Inocêncio
2024	Vidas Bandidas	Sérgio "Serginho"
2026	A Nobreza do Amor	Omar Soliman

Film
Year	Title	Role
2012	Quinta das Janelas	Bernardo
2015	Anjo de Cabelos Longos	Rafael
2021	Entre	Marcos
2024	Apaixonada	Pablo
2024	Viva a Vida	Gabriel

== Awards and nominations ==
Year	Award	Category	Work	Result	Ref
2012	Prêmio Contigo! de TV	Breakout TV Actor	Leandro on Fina Estampa	Nominated	
2012	Meus Prêmios Nick	Male Hottie	Himself	Nominated	
2012	Capricho Awards	Best BR Actor	Bruno on Malhação 2012	Nominated	
2012	Capricho Awards	BR Hottie	Himself	Nominated	

Awards and achievements
Preceded by Miguel Roncato & Ana Flávia Simões	Dança dos Famosos winner Season 9 (2012 with Raquel Guarini)	Succeeded by Carol Castro & Leandro Azevedo
