= Dança dos Famosos season 9 =

Dança dos Famosos
- Season 9
- Celebrity winner: Rodrigo Simas
- Professional winner: Raquel Guarini
- No. of episodes: 16

Release
- Original network: Globo
- Original release: May 13 – September 16, 2012

Season chronology
- ← Previous; Season 8 Next → Season 10

Dança dos Famosos 9, also taglined as Dança dos Famosos 2012 is the ninth season of the Brazilian reality television show Dança dos Famosos which premiered May 13, 2012, with the competitive live shows beginning on the following week on May 20, 2012, on the Globo television network.

On September 16, 2012, actor Rodrigo Simas & Raquel Guarini won the competition over actress Cláudia Ohana & Patrick Carvalho.

== Couples ==
Celebrity	Occupation	Professional	Status
Fernanda Motta	Fashion model and TV host	Fabio Cruz	Eliminated 1st on May 20, 2012
Victor Pecoraro	Actor	Leticia Weiss	Eliminated 2nd on May 27, 2012
Gaby Amarantos	Singer & tecno brega dancer	Bruno Galhardo	Eliminated 3rd on June 3, 2012
Minotauro	UFC Heavyweight Champion	Juliana Valcezia	Eliminated 4th on June 10, 2012
Sthefany Brito; Returned on July 1, 2012	Actress	Leandro Azevedo	Eliminated 5th on June 17, 2012
Kadu Moliterno; Returned on July 1, 2012	Actor	Daniele De Lova	Eliminated 6th on June 24, 2012
Júlio Rocha	Actor	Carol Vieira	Eliminated 7th on July 22, 2012
Péricles	Musician, Exaltasamba singer	Luiza Modulo	Eliminated 8th on July 29, 2012
Sthefany Brito	Actress	Leandro Azevedo	Eliminated 9th on August 5, 2012
Monique Alfradique	Actress	Jota Jr.	Eliminated 10th on August 12, 2012
Kadu Moliterno	Actor	Daniele De Lova	Eliminated 11th on August 19, 2012
Bárbara Paz	Actress	Marcelo Chocolate; Maurício Wetzel (Weeks 10–13)	Eliminated 12th on August 26, 2012
Cláudia Ohana	Actress	Patrick Carvalho	Runners-up on September 16, 2012
Rodrigo Simas	Actor	Raquel Guarini	Winners on September 16, 2012

== Scoring chart ==
Lowest Score	Highest Score	Eliminated	Bottom Two	Wild Card	Winners	Runners-up

Team	Place	1	2	3	4	5	6	7	8	9	10	11	12	13	14
Rodrigo & Raquel	1	—	0/6	—	0/6	—	0/6	—	—	50	49	45	50	50	285
Claudia & Patrick	2	0/6	—	0/6	—	0/6	—	—	49	—	50	50	50	49	293
Barbara & Chocolate	3	0/6	—	0/6	—	2/6	—	—	—	49	49	50	50	46	
Kadu & Daniele	4	—	0/6	—	0/6	—	3/6	3/6	48	—	49	45	50		
Monique & Jota Jr.	5	0/6	—	0/6	—	1/6	—	—	48	—	50	45			
Sthefany & Leandro	6	1/6	—	3/6	—	3/6		6/6	—	50	48				
Pericles & Luiza	7	—	0/6	—	0/6	—	2/6	—	—	48					
Julio & Carol	8	—	1/6	—	3/6	—	1/6	—	47						
Minotauro & Juliana	9	—	0/6	—	3/6			0/6							
Gaby & Bruno	10	0/6	—	3/6				0/6							
Victor & Leticia	11	—	5/6					0/6							
Fernanda & Fabio	12	5/6						3/6							

Week 3: Gaby & Bruno and Sthefany & Leandro received the most elimination votes with three. After a random draw, Judge No. 3 (Luiz Maluf) had the casting vote and chose Gaby & Bruno to be eliminated.
Week 4: Julio & Carol and Minotauro & Juliana received the most elimination votes with three. After a random draw, Judge No. 6 (Public Vote) had the casting vote and chose Minotauro & Juliana to be eliminated.
Week 7: On the wild card round, Fernanda & Fabio and Kadu & Daniele received the second most votes to return with three. After a random draw, Judge No. 4 (Fernanda Chamma) had the casting vote and chose Kadu & Daniele to return to the competition.

== Summaries ==
=== Week 1 ===
Presentation of the Celebrities

Aired: May 13, 2012

=== Week 2 ===
- Style: Disco

Aired: May 20, 2012

Judges in order from left to right: Artistic Jury – 1 – Deborah Secco (actress), 2 – Marcello Novaes (actor), 3 – Artur Xexeo (journalist); Technical Jury – 4 – Maria Pia Finocchio (artistic director), 5 – Renato Vieira (artistic airector); Last Jury – 6 – Audience.

Running Order

Couple	Judges' Vote						Total	Result
Couple	1	2	3	4	5	6	Total	Result
Cláudia & Patrick							0	Safe
Fernanda & Fabio							5	Eliminated
Bárbara & Chocolate							0	Safe
Sthefany & Leandro							1	Safe
Gaby & Bruno							0	Safe
Monique & Jota Jr.							0	Safe

=== Week 3 ===
- Style: Disco

Aired: May 27, 2012

Judges in order from left to right: Artistic Jury – 1 – Massimo Ferrari (chef), 2 – Nathalia Dill (actress), 3 – Raphael Viana (actor); Technical Jury – 4 – Fernanda Chamma (artistic director), 5 – Carlinhos de Jesus (choreographer); Last Jury – 6 – Audience.

Running Order

Couple	Judges' Vote						Total	Result
Couple	1	2	3	4	5	6	Total	Result
Rodrigo & Raquel							0	Safe
Victor & Leticia							5	Eliminated
Kadu & Daniele							0	Safe
Minotauro & Juliana							0	Safe
Péricles & Luiza							0	Safe
Júlio & Carol							1	Safe

=== Week 4 ===
- Style: Forró

Aired: June 3, 2012

Judges in order from left to right: Artistic Jury – 1 – Sergio Loroza (actor), 2 – Cléo Pires (actress), 3 – Luiz Maluf (Caras magazine editor); Technical Jury – 4 – Suely Machado (choreographer), 5 – J.C. Violla (dance teacher); Last Jury – 6 – Audience.

Running Order

Couple	Judges' Vote						Total	Result
Couple	1	2	3	4	5	6	Total	Result
Monique & Jota Jr.							0	Safe
Sthefany & Leandro							3	Safe
Gaby & Bruno							3	Eliminated
Bárbara & Chocolate							0	Safe
Cláudia & Patrick							0	Safe

=== Week 5 ===
- Style: Forró

Aired: June 10, 2012

Judges in order from left to right: Artistic Jury – 1 – Ana Beatriz Barros (model), 2 – Jonatas Faro (actor), 3 – Debora Nascimento (actress); Technical Jury – 4 – Paulo Goulart Filho (choreographer), 5 – Ana Botafogo (ballet dancer); Last Jury – 6 – Audience.

Running Order

Couple	Judges' Vote						Total	Result
Couple	1	2	3	4	5	6	Total	Result
Péricles & Luiza							0	Safe
Júlio & Carol							3	Safe
Kadu & Daniele							0	Safe
Minotauro & Juliana							3	Eliminated
Rodrigo & Raquel							0	Safe

=== Week 6 ===
- Style: Bolero

Aired: June 17, 2012

Judges in order from left to right: Artistic Jury – 1 – Carlos Miele (stylist), 2 – Mayana Neiva (actress), 3 – Humberto Martins (actor); Technical Jury – 4 – Carlota Portella (choreographer), 5 – Ivaldo Bertazzo (choreographer); Last Jury – 6 – Audience.

Running Order

Couple	Judges' Vote						Total	Result
Couple	1	2	3	4	5	6	Total	Result
Sthefany & Leandro							3	Eliminated
Monique & Jota Jr.							1	Safe
Cláudia & Patrick							0	Safe
Bárbara & Chocolate							2	Safe

=== Week 7 ===
- Style: Bolero

Aired: June 24, 2012

Judges in order from left to right: Artistic Jury – 1 – Bruno Astuto (Época magazine columnist, 2 – Renata Kuerten (model), 3 – Aílton Graça (actor); Technical Jury – 4 – Hulda Bittencourt (ballet dancer), 5 – Ciro Barcelos (choreographer); Last Jury – 6 – Audience.

Running Order

Couple	Judges' Vote						Total	Result
Couple	1	2	3	4	5	6	Total	Result
Júlio & Carol							1	Safe
Rodrigo & Raquel							0	Safe
Péricles & Luiza							2	Safe
Kadu & Daniele							3	Eliminated

=== Week 8 ===
- Style: Foxtrot

Aired: July 1, 2012

Judges in order from left to right: Artistic Jury – 1 – Ciro Batelli (circus main director), 2 – Fernanda Souza (actress), 3 – Carmo Dalla Vecchia (actor); Technical Jury – 4 – Fernanda Chamma (artistic director), 5 – Jarbas Homem de Mello (choreographer); Last Jury – 6 – Audience.

Running Order

Couple	Judges' Vote						Total	Result
Couple	1	2	3	4	5	6	Total	Result
Fernanda & Fabio							3	Eliminated
Victor & Leticia							0	Eliminated
Gaby & Bruno							0	Eliminated
Minotauro & Juliana							0	Eliminated
Sthefany & Leandro							6	Advanced
Kadu & Daniele							3	Advanced

=== Week 9 ===
- Style: Rock and Roll

Aired: July 22, 2012

Judges in order from left to right: Artistic Jury – 1 – Felix Fassone (Contigo! magazine columnist), 2 – Juliana Paes (actress), 3 – Nelson Freitas (comedian); Technical Jury – 4 – Lourdes Braga (dance teacher), 5 – J.C. Violla (choreographer).

Running Order

Couple	Judges' Score					Total	Average Scores				Total	Result
Couple	1	2	3	4	5	Total	A	T	P	V	Total	Result
Júlio & Carol	09	09	10	10	09	47	9.3	9.5	8.7	9.1	36.6	Eliminated
Monique & Jota Jr.	10	10	10	09	09	48	10	9.0	9.4	9.0	37.4	Safe
Kadu & Daniele	09	10	10	10	09	48	9.7	9.5	9.7	9.2	38.1	Safe
Cláudia & Patrick	10	10	10	10	09	49	10	9.5	9.0	8.8	37.3	Safe

=== Week 10 ===
- Style: Rock and Roll

Aired: July 29, 2012

Judges in order from left to right: Artistic Jury – 1 – Jayme Matarazzo (actor), 2 – Christiane Torloni (actress), 3 – Caçulinha (pianist); Technical Jury – 4 – Regina Calil (choreographer), 5 – Renato Vieira (artistic director).

Running Order

Couple	Judges' Score					Total	Average Scores				Total	Result
Couple	1	2	3	4	5	Total	A	T	P	V	Total	Result
Bárbara & Chocolate	10	10	10	10	09	49	10	9.5	8.9	8.9	37.3	Safe
Péricles & Luiza	10	10	10	10	08	48	10	9.0	9.0	8.9	36.9	Eliminated
Sthefany & Leandro	10	10	10	10	10	50	10	10	9.5	9.3	38.8	Safe
Rodrigo & Raquel	10	10	10	10	10	50	10	10	9.6	9.3	38.9	Safe

=== Week 11 ===
- Style: Funk

Aired: August 5, 2012

Judges in order from left to right: Artistic Jury – 1 – Ancelmo Gois (journalist), 2 – Paolla Oliveira (actress), 3 – Diogo Nogueira (singer); Technical Jury – 4 – Carlota Portella (choreographer), 5 – Fly (choreographer).

Running Order

Couple	Judges' Score					Total	Average Scores				Total	Result
Couple	1	2	3	4	5	Total	A	T	P	V	Total	Result
Cláudia & Patrick	10	10	10	10	10	50	10	10	8.7	8.1	36.8	4th
Bárbara & Maurício	10	10	10	10	09	49	10	9.5	8.8	8.4	36.7	5th
Kadu & Daniele	10	10	10	10	09	49	10	9.5	9.6	9.1	38.2	2nd
Monique & Jota Jr.	10	10	10	10	10	50	10	10	8.5	8.8	37.3	3rd
Rodrigo & Raquel	09	10	10	10	10	49	9.7	10	9.4	9.4	38.5	1st
Sthefany & Leandro	10	10	10	09	09	48	10	09	8.4	9.1	36.5	Eliminated

=== Week 12 ===
- Style: Salsa

Aired: August 12, 2012

Judges in order from left to right: Artistic Jury – 1 – Mariana Rios (actress), 2 – Gustavo Rosa (painter), 3 – Regina Duarte (actress); Technical Jury – 4 – Ivaldo Bertazzo (choreographer), 5 – Suely Machado (choreographer).

Running Order

Couple	Judges' Score					Total	Average Scores				Total	Result
Couple	1	2	3	4	5	Total	A	T	P	V	Total	Result
Monique & Jota Jr.	10	10	09	07	09	45	9.7	8.0	8.0	8.8	72.8	Eliminated
Kadu & Daniele	10	10	09	08	08	45	9.7	8.0	8.6	8.3	72.8	4th
Cláudia & Patrick	10	10	10	10	10	50	10	10	9.6	8.6	74.7	2nd
Rodrigo & Raquel	10	10	09	07	09	45	9.7	8.0	9.4	9.3	74.9	1st
Bárbara & Maurício	10	10	10	10	10	50	10	10	9.5	8.3	74.5	3rd

=== Week 13 ===
- Style: Waltz

Aired: August 19, 2012

Judges in order from left to right: Artistic Jury – 1 – Ana Maria Braga (television host), 2 – Wanderley Nunes (hair stylist), 3 – Danielle Winits (actress); Technical Jury – 4 – Anselmo Zolla (theatre director), 5 – Ana Botafogo (ballet dancer).

Running Order

Couple	Judges' Score					Total	Average Scores				Total	Result
Couple	1	2	3	4	5	Total	A	T	P	V	Total	Result
Kadu & Daniele	10	10	10	10	10	50	10	10	8.6	8.8	110.3	Eliminated
Bárbara & Maurício	10	10	10	10	10	50	10	10	9.1	8.2	111.8	2nd
Rodrigo & Raquel	10	10	10	10	10	50	10	10	8.7	8.8	112.4	1st
Cláudia & Patrick	10	10	10	10	10	50	10	10	8.9	8.2	111.8	2nd

=== Week 14 ===
- Style: Country

Aired: August 26, 2012

Judges in order from left to right: Artistic Jury – 1 – Regina Martelli (journalist), 2 – Mateus Solano (actor), 3 – Ana Cláudia Michels (model); Technical Jury – 4 – Ciro Barcellos (dance teacher), 5 – Fátima Bernardes (journalist).

Running Order

Couple	Judges' Score					Total	Average Scores				Total	Result
Couple	1	2	3	4	5	Total	A	T	P	V	Total	Result
Cláudia & Patrick	10	10	10	10	09	49	10	9.5	9.1	8.4	148.8	2nd
Rodrigo & Raquel	10	10	10	10	10	50	10	10	9.5	8.6	150.5	1st
Bárbara & Maurício	09	10	10	09	08	46	9.7	8.5	8.9	8.4	147.4	Eliminated

=== Week 15 ===
Round 1

- Style: Pasodoble

Aired: September 2, 2012

Judges in order from left to right: Artistic Jury – 1 – Fábio Assunção (actor), 2 – Preta Gil (singer), 3 – Rodrigo Hilbert (actor), 4 – Michella Cruz (model), 5 – Luciano Huck (television host); Technical Jury – 6 – Carlota Portela (choreographer), 7 – Carlinhos de Jesus (choreographer), 8 – Suely Machado (choreographer), 9 – Ivaldo Bertazzo (choreographer), 10 – Lourdes Braga (dance teacher).

Running Order

Couple	Judges' Score					Total	Average Scores				Total
Couple	1	2	3	4	5	Total	A	T	P	V	Total
Couple	6	7	8	9	10	Total	A	T	P	V	Total
Rodrigo & Raquel	10	09	10	10	10	93	9.8	8.8	9.1	9.4	37.1
Rodrigo & Raquel	09	09	09	08	09	93	9.8	8.8	9.1	9.4	37.1
Cláudia & Patrick	10	10	10	10	10	99	10	9.8	9.2	8.0	37.0
Cláudia & Patrick	10	10	10	09	10	99	10	9.8	9.2	8.0	37.0

=== Week 16 ===
Round 2

- Style: Tango & Samba

Aired: September 16, 2012

Judges in order from left to right: Artistic Jury – 1 – Romero Britto (painter), 2 – Sheron Menezzes (actress), 3 – Arthur Xexéo (journalist), 4 – Ivete Sangalo (singer), 5 – Miguel Roncato (actor); Technical Jury – 6 – Maria Pia Finocchio (artistic director), 7 – J.C. Violla (choreographer), 8 – Fernanda Chamma (artistic director), 9 – Renato Vieira (artistic director), 10 – Ana Botafogo (ballet dancer).

Running Order

Couple	Judges' Score					Total	Average Scores				Total
Couple	1	2	3	4	5	Total	A	T	P	V	Total
Couple	6	7	8	9	10	Total	A	T	P	V	Total
Rodrigo & Raquel	10	10	09	10	10	92	9.8	8.6	9.5	9.9	37.8
Rodrigo & Raquel	09	09	08	08	09	92	9.8	8.6	9.5	9.9	37.8
Rodrigo & Raquel	10	10	10	10	10	100	10	10	9.6	9.9	39.5
Rodrigo & Raquel	10	10	10	10	10	100	10	10	9.6	9.9	39.5
Cláudia & Patrick	10	10	09	10	10	95	9.8	9.2	9.4	9.9	38.3
Cláudia & Patrick	10	09	09	09	09	95	9.8	9.2	9.4	9.9	38.3
Cláudia & Patrick	10	10	10	10	10	99	10	9.8	9.3	9.8	38.9
Cláudia & Patrick	10	09	10	10	10	99	10	9.8	9.3	9.8	38.9

Final Results

Couple	Averages			Total	Result
Couple	Dance 1	Dance 2	Dance 3	Total	Result
Rodrigo & Raquel	37.1	37.8	39.5	114.4	Winner
Cláudia & Patrick	37.0	38.3	38.9	114.2	Runner-up
