= Dança dos Famosos season 10 =

Dança dos Famosos
- Season 10
- Promotional advertisement for season 10
- Celebrity winner: Carol Castro
- Professional winner: Leandro Azevedo
- No. of episodes: 15

Release
- Original network: Globo
- Original release: May 19 – September 15, 2013

Season chronology
- ← Previous; Season 9 Next → Season 11

Dança dos Famosos 2013 was the tenth season of the Brazilian reality show Dança dos Famosos which premiered on May 19, 2013, with the competitive live shows beginning on the following week on May 26, 2013, at 7:30 p.m./6:30 p.m. (BRT/AMT) on Rede Globo.

On September 15, 2013, actress Carol Castro & Leandro Azevedo won the competition over actress Bruna Marquezine & Átila Amaral and actor Tiago Abravanel & Ana Paula Guedes. Leandro is the first professional partner to win the show twice.

== Couples ==
Celebrity	Known for	Professional	Status
Gusttavo Lima	Sertanejo singer	Ana Flávia Simões	Eliminated 1st on May 26, 2013
Ana Beatriz Barros	Model	Rodrigo Ramalho	Eliminated 2nd on June 2, 2013
Edílson	Former football player	Lidiane Rodrigues	Eliminated 3rd on June 9, 2013
Bia Seidl	Actress	Edson Almeida	Withdrew on June 16, 2013
Daniel Boaventura; Returned on July 28	Actor	Juliana Valcézia	Eliminated 4th on June 23, 2013
Luana Piovani; Returned on July 21	Actress	Wagner Santos	Eliminated 5th on June 30, 2013
Daniel Boaventura	Actor	Juliana Valcézia	Eliminated 6th on August 4, 2013
Luana Piovani	Actress	Wagner Santos	Withdrew on August 11, 2013
Cacau Protásio	Actress	Deny Ronaldo; Rodrigo Picanço (Weeks 1–4)	Eliminated 7th on August 18, 2013
Adriano Garib	Actor	Aline Riscado	Eliminated 8th on August 25, 2013
Klebber Toledo	Actor	Ivi Pizzott	Eliminated 9th on September 1, 2013
Tiago Abravanel	Actor	Ana Paula Guedes	Third place on September 15, 2013
Bruna Marquezine	Actress	Átila Amaral	Runner-up on September 15, 2013
Carol Castro	Actress	Leandro Azevedo	Winner on September 15, 2013

== Elimination chart ==
Lowest score	Highest score	Eliminated	Bottom two	Withdrew	Dance-off
Lowest score	Highest score	Deadlock	Third place	Runner-up	Winners

Couple	Place	1	2	3	4	5	6	7	8	9	10	11	12	13	14
Carol & Leandro	1	—	0/6	—	0/6	—	0/6	—	—	50	—	50	50	49	195
Bruna & Átila	2	—	0/6	—	0/6	—	0/6	—	—	49	—	50	46	47	192
Tiago & Ana Paula	3	0/6	—	0/6	—	0/6	—	—	—	48	—	49	45	48	190
Klebber & Ivi	4	0/6	—	0/6	—	0/6	—	—	—	—	50	48	46	47	
Adriano & Aline	5	0/6	—	1/6	—	0/6	—	—	—	—	48	48	46		
Cacau & Deny	6	—	0/6	—	0/6	—	1/6	—	—	—	45	48			
Luana & Wagner	7	—	0/6	—	0/6	—	5/6	6/13	—	—	WD				
Daniel & Juliana	8	1/6	—	2/6	—	6/6		3/13	49	49					
Bia & Edson	9	—	1/6	—	WD			WD							
Edilson & Lidiane	10	0/6	—	3/6				3/13	47						
Ana Beatriz & Rodrigo	11	—	5/6					0/13							
Gusttavo & Ana Flavia	12	5/6						1/13							

== Weekly results ==
A – Artistic jury	T – Technical jury	S – Studio audience	V – Viewers at home
Bottom two		Eliminated	

=== Week 1 ===
Presentation of the Celebrities

Aired: May 19, 2013

=== Week 2 ===
Week 1 – Men

- Style: Disco

Aired: May 26, 2013

Judges

Artistic			Technical	
1	2	3	4	5
Fabiana Karla	Ancelmo Gois	Fernanda Souza	JC Violla	Maria Pia Finocchio

Running order

Couple	Judges' vote					Total votes	Public vote				Week total	Final total	Result
Couple	1	2	3	4	5	Total votes	A	T	S	V	Week total	Final total	Result
Daniel & Juliana						0	N/A		✗	N/A		1	Safe
Edilson & Lidiane						0	N/A			N/A		0	Safe
Adriano & Aline						0	N/A			N/A		0	Safe
Gusttavo & Ana Flavia	✗	✗	✗	✗	✗	5	N/A			N/A		5	Eliminated
Klebber & Ivi						0	N/A			N/A		0	Safe
Tiago & Ana Paula						0	N/A			N/A		0	Safe

=== Week 3 ===
Week 1 – Women

- Style: Disco

Aired: June 2, 2013

Judges

Artistic			Technical	
1	2	3	4	5
Fernanda Motta	Alex Escobar	Deborah Secco	Paulo Goulart F.	Carlota Portella

Running order

Couple	Judges' vote					Total votes	Public vote				Week total	Final total	Result
Couple	1	2	3	4	5	Total votes	A	T	S	V	Week total	Final total	Result
Carol & Leandro						0	N/A			N/A		0	Safe
Ana Beatriz & Rodrigo		✗	✗	✗	✗	4	N/A		✗	N/A		5	Eliminated
Bia & Edson	✗					1	N/A			N/A		1	Safe
Cacau & Rodrigo						0	N/A			N/A		0	Safe
Bruna & Átila						0	N/A			N/A		0	Safe
Luana & Wagner						0	N/A			N/A		0	Safe

=== Week 4 ===
Week 2 – Men

- Style: Forró

Aired: June 9, 2013

Judges

Artistic			Technical	
1	2	3	4	5
Letícia Birkheuer	Júlio Rocha	Sonia Racy	Ciro Barcellos	Regina Calil

Running order

Couple	Judges' vote					Total votes	Public vote				Week total	Final total	Result
Couple	1	2	3	4	5	Total votes	A	T	S	V	Week total	Final total	Result
Tiago & Ana Paula						0	N/A			N/A		0	Safe
Adriano & Aline			✗			1	N/A			N/A		1	Safe
Daniel & Juliana	✗					1	N/A		✗	N/A		2	Safe
Edilson & Lidiane		✗		✗	✗	3	N/A			N/A		3	Eliminated
Klebber & Ivi						0	N/A			N/A		0	Safe

=== Week 5 ===
Week 2 – Women

- Style: Forró

Aired: June 16, 2013

Judges

Artistic			Technical	
1	2	3	4	5
Glória Maria	Sidney Sampaio	Renata Kuerten	Renato Vieira	Ana Botafogo

Running order

Couple	Judges' vote					Total votes	Public vote				Week total	Final total	Result
Couple	1	2	3	4	5	Total votes	A	T	S	V	Week total	Final total	Result
Luana & Wagner						0	N/A			N/A		0	Safe
Carol & Leandro						0	N/A			N/A		0	Safe
Cacau & Rodrigo						0	N/A			N/A		0	Safe
Bruna & Átila						0	N/A			N/A		0	Safe
Bia & Edson						0	N/A			N/A		0	Withdrew

=== Week 6 ===
Week 3 – Men

- Style: Rock and Roll

Aired: June 23, 2013

Judges

Artistic			Technical	
1	2	3	4	5
Bárbara Paz	Arthur Xexéo	Wanessa	Carlinhos de Jesus	Suely Machado

Running order

Couple	Judges' vote					Total votes	Public vote				Week total	Final total	Result
Couple	1	2	3	4	5	Total votes	A	T	S	V	Week total	Final total	Result
Klebber & Ivi						0	N/A			N/A		0	Safe
Daniel & Juliana	✗	✗	✗	✗	✗	5	N/A		✗	N/A		6	Eliminated
Adriano & Aline						0	N/A			N/A		0	Safe
Tiago & Ana Paula						0	N/A			N/A		0	Safe

=== Week 7 ===
Week 3 – Women

- Style: Rock and Roll

Aired: June 30, 2013

Judges

Artistic			Technical	
1	2	3	4	5
Mayana Neiva	Luiz Maluf	Mariana Ferrão	Ivaldo Bertazzo	Fernanda Chamma

Running order

Couple	Judges' vote					Total votes	Public vote				Week total	Final total	Result
Couple	1	2	3	4	5	Total votes	A	T	S	V	Week total	Final total	Result
Cacau & Deny	✗					1	N/A			N/A		1	Safe
Luana & Wagner		✗	✗	✗	✗	4	N/A		✗	N/A		5	Eliminated
Bruna & Átila						0	N/A			N/A		0	Safe
Carol & Leandro						0	N/A			N/A		0	Safe

=== Week 8 ===
Dance-off

- Style: Foxtrot

Aired: July 21, 2013

Judges

Artistic			Technical	
1	2	3	4	5
Walcyr Carrasco	Fernanda Motta	Kadu Moliterno	Lourdes Braga	Renato Vieira

Running order

Couple	Judges' vote					Total votes	Public vote				Week total	Final total	Result
Couple	1	2	3	4	5	Total votes	A	T	S	V	Week total	Final total	Result
Bia & Edson						0	N/A				N/A	0	Withdrew
Edilson & Lidiane	✔	✔	✔			3	N/A				N/A	3	Deadlock
Ana Beatriz & Rodrigo						0	N/A				N/A	0	Eliminated
Gusttavo & Ana Flavia						0	N/A			✔	N/A	1	Eliminated
Daniel & Juliana				✔	✔	2	N/A		✔		N/A	3	Deadlock
Luana & Wagner	✔	✔	✔	✔	✔	5	N/A		✔		N/A	6	Advanced

=== Week 9 ===
Deadlock

- Style: Sertanejo

Aired: July 28, 2013

Judges

Artistic			Technical	
1	2	3	4	5
Massimo Ferrari	Cris Vianna	Raphael Viana	Hulda Bittencourt	Jayme Arôxa

Running order

Couple	Judges' score					Total score	Average score				Week total	Final total	Result
Couple	1	2	3	4	5	Total score	A	T	S	V	Week total	Final total	Result
Edilson & Lidiane	09	10	10	09	09	47	9.6	9.0	8.8	9.5	36.6	36.6	Eliminated
Daniel & Juliana	09	10	10	10	10	49	9.6	10	9.5	9.9	39.0	39.0	Advanced

=== Week 10 ===
Team A

- Style: Funk

Aired: August 4, 2013

Judges

Artistic			Technical	
1	2	3	4	5
Flávia Freire	Ricardo Pereira	Sophie Charlotte	Fly	Suely Machado

Running order

Couple	Judges' score					Total score	Average score				Week total	Final total	Result
Couple	1	2	3	4	5	Total score	A	T	S	V	Week total	Final total	Result
Bruna & Átila	10	10	10	10	10	50	10	10	9.6	9.9	39.5	39.5	1st
Daniel & Juliana	10	10	10	10	09	49	10	9.5	9.5	9.4	38.4	38.4	Eliminated
Carol & Leandro	10	10	10	10	10	50	10	10	9.3	9.4	38.7	38.7	2nd
Tiago & Ana Paula	10	10	10	09	09	48	10	9.0	9.8	9.7	38.5	38.5	3rd

=== Week 11 ===
Team B

- Style: Funk

Aired: August 11, 2013

Judges

Artistic			Technical	
1	2	3	4	5
Maitê Proença	Antonio Carlos	Débora Nascimento	Octávio Nassur	Carlota Portella

Running order

Couple	Judges' score					Total score	Average score				Week total	Final total	Result
Couple	1	2	3	4	5	Total score	A	T	S	V	Week total	Final total	Result
Adriano & Aline	10	10	10	09	09	48	10	9.0	8.4	9.2	36.6	36.6	2nd
Cacau & Deny	10	10	09	08	08	45	9.7	8.0	9.2	9.3	36.2	36.2	3rd
Klebber & Ivi	10	10	10	10	10	50	10	10	9.4	9.8	39.2	39.2	1st
Luana & Wagner													Withdrew

=== Week 12 ===
Top 6

- Style: Salsa

Aired: August 18, 2013

Judges

Artistic			Technical	
1	2	3	4	5
Ronnie Von	Carol Celico	Marcos Pasquim	Ana Botafogo	Jarbas H. de Mello

Running order

Couple	Judges' score					Total score	Average score				Week total	Final total	Result
Couple	1	2	3	4	5	Total score	A	T	S	V	Week total	Final total	Result
Klebber & Ivi	10	10	10	09	09	48	10	9.0	9.2	9.7	37.9	77.1	4th
Bruna & Átila	10	10	10	10	10	50	10	10	9.8	9.9	39.7	79.2	1st
Tiago & Ana Paula	10	10	10	10	09	49	10	9.5	9.6	9.8	38.9	77.4	3rd
Carol & Leandro	10	10	10	10	10	50	10	10	9.6	9.6	39.2	77.9	2nd
Adriano & Aline	10	10	10	09	09	48	10	09	9.4	9.4	37.8	74.4	5th
Cacau & Deny	10	10	10	09	09	48	10	9.0	9.5	9.6	38.1	74.3	Eliminated

=== Week 13 ===
Top 5

- Style: Waltz

Aired: August 25, 2013

Judges

Artistic			Technical	
1	2	3	4	5
Fábio Porchat	Fernanda Vasconcellos	José Simão	Fátima Bernardes	Anselmo Zolla

Running order

Couple	Judges' score					Total score	Average score				Week total	Final total	Result
Couple	1	2	3	4	5	Total score	A	T	S	V	Week total	Final total	Result
Adriano & Aline	09	10	09	09	09	46	9.3	9.0	8.8	9.2	36.3	110.7	Eliminated
Bruna & Átila	09	10	09	09	09	46	9.3	9.0	9.5	9.9	37.7	116.9	2nd
Klebber & Ivi	09	10	09	09	09	46	9.3	9.0	9.3	9.7	37.3	114.4	3rd
Carol & Leandro	10	10	10	10	10	50	10	10	9.8	9.7	39.5	117.4	1st
Tiago & Ana Paula	09	10	09	09	09	46	9.3	9.0	9.2	9.7	36.9	114.3	4th

=== Week 14 ===
Top 4

- Style: Pasodoble

Aired: September 1, 2013

Judges

Artistic			Technical	
1	2	3	4	5
Fafá de Belém	Bruno Astuto	Fernanda Machado	Caio Nunes	Hulda Bittencourt

Running order

Couple	Judges' score					Total score	Average score				Week total	Final total	Result
Couple	1	2	3	4	5	Total score	A	T	S	V	Week total	Final total	Result
Tiago & Ana Paula	10	10	10	09	09	48	10	9.0	9.5	9.7	38.2	152.5	3rd
Bruna & Átila	09	10	10	09	09	47	9.7	9.0	9.7	9.8	38.2	155.1	2nd
Klebber & Ivi	10	10	10	08	09	47	10	8.5	9.5	9.7	37.7	152.1	Eliminated
Carol & Leandro	10	10	10	09	10	49	10	9.5	9.8	9.6	38.9	156.3	1st

=== Week 15 ===
Top 3

- Style: Tango & Samba

Aired: September 15, 2013

Judges

Artistic			Technical	
1	2	3	7	8
Paula Fernandes	Arthur Xexéo	Paolla Oliveira	Fernanda Chamma	Carlinhos de Jesus
4	5	6	9	10
Rodrigo Simas	Christiane Torloni	Ricardo Waddington	Maria Pia Finocchio	Paulo Goulart F.

Running order

Tango
Couple	Judges' score					Total score	Average score				Dance total	Final total	Result
Couple	1	2	3	4	5	Total score	A	T	S	V	Dance total	Final total	Result
Couple	6	7	8	9	10	Total score	A	T	S	V	Dance total	Final total	Result
Tiago & Ana Paula	10	09	10	10	10	94	9.8	8.8	9.6	9.6	37.8	37.8	N/A
Tiago & Ana Paula	10	09	09	09	08	94	9.8	8.8	9.6	9.6	37.8	37.8	N/A
Bruna & Átila	10	10	10	10	10	96	9.8	9.2	9.7	9.9	38.6	38.6	N/A
Bruna & Átila	09	09	09	09	10	96	9.8	9.2	9.7	9.9	38.6	38.6	N/A
Carol & Leandro	10	10	10	10	10	96	9.8	9.2	9.4	9.7	38.1	38.1	N/A
Carol & Leandro	09	09	09	10	09	96	9.8	9.2	9.4	9.7	38.1	38.1	N/A

Samba
Couple	Judges' score					Total score	Average score				Dance total	Final total	Result
Couple	1	2	3	4	5	Total score	A	T	S	V	Dance total	Final total	Result
Couple	6	7	8	9	10	Total score	A	T	S	V	Dance total	Final total	Result
Tiago & Ana Paula	10	10	10	10	10	96	10	9.0	9.6	9.6	38.2	76.0	Third place
Tiago & Ana Paula	10	09	09	09	09	96	10	9.0	9.6	9.6	38.2	76.0	Third place
Bruna & Átila	10	10	10	09	10	96	9.8	9.2	9.7	9.8	38.5	77.1	Runner-up
Bruna & Átila	10	10	09	09	09	96	9.8	9.2	9.7	9.8	38.5	77.1	Runner-up
Carol & Leandro	10	10	10	10	10	99	10	9.8	9.7	9.7	39.2	77.3	Winner
Carol & Leandro	10	10	09	10	10	99	10	9.8	9.7	9.7	39.2	77.3	Winner
