= Henrique Viana =

Portuguese actor (1936–2007)

- Born: June 29, 1936; Lisbon, Portugal
- Died: July 4, 2007 (aged 71); Portugal

Henrique Viana (Lisbon, June 29, 1936 — Lisbon, July 4, 2007) was a Portuguese actor who worked in theatre, cinema and television. He died of cancer in Capuchos Hospital, aged 71.

== Filmography ==
- Aqui Há Fantasmas (1964) by Pedro Martins
- A Maluquinha de Arroios (1970) by Henrique Campos
- Malteses, Burgueses e às Vezes... (1974) by Artur Semedo
- A Fuga (1977) by Luís Filipe Rocha
- Amor de Perdição (1979) by Manoel de Oliveira
- A Santa Aliança (1980) by Eduardo Geada
- A Vida é Bela...!? (1982) by Luís Galvão Teles
- Antes a Sorte que Tal Morte (1983) by João Matos Silva
- Sem Sombra de Pecado (1983) by José Fonseca e Costa
- Um Adeus Português (1985) by João Botelho
- Balada da Praia dos Cães (1986) by José Fonseca e Costa
- Duma Vez por Todas (1986) by Joaquim Leitão
- Saudades Para Dona Genciana (1986) by Eduardo Geada
- Máscara de Aço Contra Abismo Azul (1988) by Paulo Rocha
- Tempos Difíceis (1988) by João Botelho
- O Querido Lilás (1989) by Artur Semedo
- Recordações da Casa Amarela (1989) by João César Monteiro
- Segno di fuoco (1990) by Nino Bizzarri
- Amor e Dedinhos de Pé (1991) by Luís Filipe Rocha
- Nuvem (1991) by Ana Luísa Guimarães
- O Sangue (1991) by Pedro Costa
- Um Crime de Luxo (1991) by Artur Semedo
- Vertigem (1991) by Leandro Ferreira
- Ladrão Que Rouba a Anão Tem Cem Anos de Prisão (1992) by Jorge Paixão da Costa
- No Dia dos Meus Anos (1992) by João Botelho
- Requiem para um Narciso (1992) by João Pedro Ruivo
- Rosa Negra (1992) by Margarida Gil
- Viuvez Secreta (1992) by Jorge Marecos Duarte
- Amok (1993) by Joël Farges
- Aqui Na Terra (1993) by João Botelho
- O Fim do Mundo (1993) by João Mário Grilo
- Adeus Princesa (1994) by Jorge Paixão da Costa
- Eternidade (1995) by Quirino Simões
- Sinais de Fogo (1995) by Luís Filipe Rocha
- Elas (1997) by Luís Galvão Teles
- Longe da Vista (1998) by João Mário Grilo
- O Anjo da Guarda (1999) by Margarida Gil
- O Lampião da Estrela (2000) by Diamantino Costa
- Capitães de Abril (2000) by Maria de Medeiros
- 451 Forte (2001) by João Mário Grilo
- A Bomba (2001) by Leonel Vieira
- A Falha (2002) by João Mário Grilo
- O Rapaz do Trapézio Voador (2002) by Fernando Matos Silva
- Portugal S.A. (2003) by Ruy Guerra

== TV series ==
- Chuva na Areia (1985)
- Sozinhos Em Casa (1993)
- Os Imparáveis (1996)
- Camilo na Prisão (1998)
- Esquadra de Polícia (1999)
- Alves dos Reis (2001)
- Processo dos Távoras (2001)
- Inspector Max (2005)
- Bocage (2006)
- Morangos com Açúcar (2006)
- Paixões Proibidas (2007)
