= Dança dos Famosos season 11 =

Dança dos Famosos
- Season 11
- Celebrity winner: Marcello Melo Jr.
- Professional winner: Raquel Guarini
- No. of episodes: 16

Release
- Original network: Globo
- Original release: July 27 – November 30, 2014

Season chronology
- ← Previous; Season 10 Next → Season 12

Dança dos Famosos 2014 is the eleventh season of the Brazilian reality television show Dança dos Famosos which premiered on July 27, 2014, with the competitive live shows beginning on the following week on August 3, 2014, at 7:30 / 6:30 p.m. (BRT/AMT) on Rede Globo.

On November 30, 2014, actor Marcello Melo Jr. & Raquel Guarini won the competition over actress Paloma Bernardi and Patrick Carvalho. Raquel is the first female professional partner to win the show twice.

== Couples ==
Celebrity	Notability (known for)	Professional	Status
Anderson Di Rizzi; Returned on September 14	Actor	Tainá Grando	Eliminated 1st on August 3, 2014
Vanessa Gerbelli	Actress	Deny Ronaldo	Eliminated 2nd on August 10, 2014
Luís Carlos Miele	TV producer	Aline Riscado	Eliminated 3rd on August 17, 2014
Lucélia Santos	Actress	Renato Zóia	Eliminated 4th on August 24, 2014
Bruno Gissoni; Returned on September 14	Actor	Gabrielle Cardoso	Eliminated 5th on August 31, 2014
Anitta	Funk singer	Magno Dutra	Eliminated 6th on September 7, 2014
Bruno Gissoni	Actor	Gabrielle Cardoso	Eliminated 7th on September 21, 2014
Anderson Di Rizzi	Actor	Tainá Grando	Eliminated 8th on September 28, 2014
Lucas Lucco	Sertanejo singer	Ana Paula Guedes	Eliminated 9th on October 19, 2014
Giovanna Ewbank	Actress	Rogerio Mendonça	Eliminated 10th on November 2, 2014
Giba	Former volleyball player	Camila Lobo	Eliminated 11th on November 9, 2014
Juliana Paiva	Actress	Átila Amaral; Saulo Rangel (week 1–4)	Eliminated 12th on November 16, 2014
Paloma Bernardi	Actress	Patrick Carvalho	Runner-up on November 30, 2014
Marcello Melo Jr.	Actor	Raquel Guarini	Winner on November 30, 2014

== Elimination chart ==
Couple	Place	1	2	3	4	5	6	7	8	9	10	11	12	13	14	15
Marcello & Raquel	1	0/6	—N/a	0/6	—N/a	0/6	—N/a	—N/a	—N/a	0/6	49.8	48.5	50.0	49.7	49.3	117.9
Paloma & Patrick	2	—N/a	0/6	—N/a	0/6	—N/a	0/6	—N/a	0/6	—N/a	47.0	49.4	49.0	49.7	50.0	118.0
Juliana & Átila	3	—N/a	2/6	—N/a	2/6	—N/a	2/6	—N/a	—N/a	2/6	47.4	48.6	49.5	49.1	49.0	
Giba & Camila	4	0/6	—N/a	0/6	—N/a	0/6	—N/a	—N/a	1/6	—N/a	49.3	48.0	49.2	48.5		
Giovanna & Rogerio	5	—N/a	0/6	—N/a	1/6	—N/a	1/6	—N/a	1/6	—	46.5	48.9	49.7			
Lucas & Ana Paula	6	1/6	—N/a	0/6	—N/a	0/6	—N/a	—N/a	—N/a	1/6	46.5	47.7				
Anderson & Tainá	7	4/6						5/12	—N/a	3/6						
Bruno & Gabrielle	8	0/6	—N/a	0/6	—N/a	6/6		4/12	4/6							
Anitta & Magno	9	—N/a	0/6	—N/a	0/6	—N/a	3/6	3/12								
Lucélia & Renato	10	—N/a	0/6	—N/a	3/6			0/12								
Miele & Aline	11	1/6	—N/a	6/6				WD								
Vanessa & Deny	12	—N/a	4/6					0/12								

Key
Lowest score
Highest score
Eliminated
Bottom two
Dance-off
Withdrew
Runner-up
Winner

== Weekly results ==
A – Artistic jury	T – Technical jury	S – Studio audience	V – Viewers at home
Bottom two		Eliminated	

=== Week 1 ===
Presentation of the Celebrities

Aired: July 27, 2014

=== Week 2 ===
Week 1 – Men

- Style: Disco

Aired: August 3, 2014

Judges

Artistic			Technical	
1	2	3	4	5
Deborah Secco	Arthur Xexéo	Luana Piovani	Paulo Goulart F.	Carlota Portella

Running order

Couple	Judges' vote					Total votes	Public vote				Week total	Final total	Result
Couple	1	2	3	4	5	Total votes	A	T	S	V	Week total	Final total	Result
Anderson & Tainá	✗	✗		✗	✗	4	N/A			N/A		4	Eliminated
Miele & Aline						0	N/A		✗	N/A		1	Safe
Bruno & Gabrielle						0	N/A			N/A		0	Safe
Giba & Camila						0	N/A			N/A		0	Safe
Lucas & Ana Paula			✗			1	N/A			N/A		1	Safe
Marcello & Raquel						0	N/A			N/A		0	Safe

=== Week 3 ===
Week 1 – Women

- Style: Disco

Aired: August 10, 2014

Judges

Artistic			Technical	
1	2	3	4	5
Bruno Astuto	Cris Vianna	Tiago Leifert	Fernanda Chamma	Renato Vieira

Running order

Couple	Judges' vote					Total votes	Public vote				Week total	Final total	Result
Couple	1	2	3	4	5	Total votes	A	T	S	V	Week total	Final total	Result
Juliana & Saulo				✗	✗	2	N/A			N/A		2	Safe
Vanessa & Deny	✗	✗	✗			3	N/A		✗	N/A		4	Eliminated
Giovanna & Rogerio						0	N/A			N/A		0	Safe
Lucélia & Renato						0	N/A			N/A		0	Safe
Anitta & Magno						0	N/A			N/A		0	Safe
Paloma & Patrick						0	N/A			N/A		0	Safe

=== Week 4 ===
Week 2 – Men

- Style: Forró

Aired: August 17, 2014

Judges

Artistic			Technical	
1	2	3	4	5
Daniela Mercury	Ancelmo Gois	Fernanda Souza	Ciro Barcelos	Cláudia Raia

Running order

Couple	Judges' vote					Total votes	Public vote				Week total	Final total	Result
Couple	1	2	3	4	5	Total votes	A	T	S	V	Week total	Final total	Result
Giba & Camila						0	N/A			N/A		0	Safe
Bruno & Gabrielle						0	N/A			N/A		0	Safe
Miele & Aline	✗	✗	✗	✗	✗	5	N/A		✗	N/A		6	Eliminated
Marcello & Raquel						0	N/A			N/A		0	Safe
Lucas & Ana Paula						0	N/A			N/A		0	Safe

=== Week 5 ===
Week 2 – Women

- Style: Forró

Aired: August 24, 2014

Judges

Artistic			Technical	
1	2	3	4	5
Michela Cruz	Kadu Moliterno	Débora Nascimento	Jarbas H. de Melo	Suely Machado

Running order

Couple	Judges' vote					Total votes	Public vote				Week total	Final total	Result
Couple	1	2	3	4	5	Total votes	A	T	S	V	Week total	Final total	Result
Paloma & Patrick						0	N/A			N/A		0	Safe
Giovanna & Rogerio						0	N/A		✗	N/A		1	Safe
Juliana & Saulo		✗	✗			2	N/A			N/A		2	Safe
Lucélia & Renato	✗			✗	✗	3	N/A			N/A		3	Eliminated
Anitta & Magno						0	N/A			N/A		0	Safe

=== Week 6 ===
Week 3 – Men

- Style: Rock and Roll

Aired: August 31, 2014

Judges

Artistic			Technical	
1	2	3	4	5
Glória Maria	Joaquim Lopes	Elaine Mickely	JC Violla	Lourdes Braga

Running order

Couple	Judges' vote					Total votes	Public vote				Week total	Final total	Result
Couple	1	2	3	4	5	Total votes	A	T	S	V	Week total	Final total	Result
Marcello & Raquel						0	N/A			N/A		0	Safe
Bruno & Gabrielle	✗	✗	✗	✗	✗	5	N/A		✗	N/A		6	Eliminated
Lucas & Ana Paula						0	N/A			N/A		0	Safe
Giba & Camila						0	N/A			N/A		0	Safe

=== Week 7 ===
Week 3 – Women

- Style: Rock and Roll

Aired: September 7, 2014

Judges

Artistic			Technical	
1	2	3	4	5
Klebber Toledo	Grazi Massafera	Luiz Maluf	Maria Pia Finocchio	Anselmo Zolla

Running order

Couple	Judges' vote					Total votes	Public vote				Week total	Final total	Result
Couple	1	2	3	4	5	Total votes	A	T	S	V	Week total	Final total	Result
Giovanna & Rogerio						0	N/A		✗	N/A		1	Safe
Paloma & Patrick						0	N/A			N/A		0	Safe
Anitta & Magno		✗	✗		✗	3	N/A			N/A		3	Eliminated
Juliana & Átila	✗			✗		2	N/A			N/A		2	Safe

=== Week 8 ===
Dance-off

- Style: Lambada

Aired: September 14, 2014

Judges

Artistic			Technical	
1	2	3	4	5
Arthur Xexéo	Lala Rudge	Daniel Boaventura	Hulda Bittencourt	Jayme Arôxa

Running order

Couple	Judges' vote					Total votes	Public vote				Week total	Final total	Result
Couple	1	2	3	4	5	Total votes	A	T	S	V	Week total	Final total	Result
Miele & Aline						0	N/A			N/A		0	Withdrew
Anderson & Tainá	✔	✔	✔	✔	✔	5	N/A			N/A		5	Advanced
Vanessa & Deny						0	N/A			N/A		0	Eliminated
Lucelia & Renato						0	N/A			N/A		0	Eliminated
Bruno & Gabrielle			✔	✔	✔	3	N/A		✔	N/A		4	Advanced
Anitta & Magno	✔	✔				2	N/A		✔	N/A		3	Eliminated

=== Week 9 ===
Team A

- Style: Funk

Aired: September 21, 2014

Judges

Artistic			Technical	
1	2	3	4	5
Mariana Ferrão	Nelson Freitas	Sonia Racy	Fly	Regina Calil

Running order

Couple	Judges' vote					Total votes	Public vote				Week total	Final total	Result
Couple	1	2	3	4	5	Total votes	A	T	S	V	Week total	Final total	Result
Paloma & Patrick						0	N/A			N/A		0	Safe
Bruno & Gabrielle			✗	✗	✗	3	N/A		✗	N/A		4	Eliminated
Giovanna & Rogerio	✗					1	N/A			N/A		1	Safe
Giba & Camila		✗				1	N/A			N/A		1	Safe

=== Week 10 ===
Team B

- Style: Funk

Aired: September 28, 2014

Judges

1	2	3	4	5
Letícia Birkheuer	Malvino Salvador	Carol Sampaio	Octavio Nassur	Carlota Portella

Running order

Couple	Judges' vote					Total votes	Public vote				Week total	Final total	Result
Couple	1	2	3	4	5	Total votes	A	T	S	V	Week total	Final total	Result
Juliana & Átila		✗			✗	2	N/A			N/A		2	Safe
Anderson & Tainá			✗	✗		2	N/A		✗	N/A		3	Eliminated
Lucas & Ana Paula	✗					1	N/A			N/A		1	Safe
Marcello & Raquel						0	N/A			N/A		0	Safe

=== Week 11 ===
Top 6

- Style: Mambo

Aired: October 12, 2014

Judges

Artistic			Technical	
1	2	3	4	5
Cristina Padiglione	Rodrigo Hilbert	Adriana Birolli	Marcelo Chocolate	Ana Botafogo

Running order

Couple	Judges' score					Total score	Average score				Week total	Final total	Result
Couple	1	2	3	4	5	Total score	A	T	S	V	Week total	Final total	Result
Giovanna & Rogerio	9.0	9.0	9.5	9.5	9.5	46.5	9.2	9.5	8.9	N/A	27.6	27.6	5th–6th
Lucas & Ana Paula	9.4	9.5	9.6	9.0	9.0	46.5	9.5	9.0	9.1	N/A	27.6	27.6	5th–6th
Juliana & Átila	9.5	9.5	9.5	9.5	9.4	47.4	9.5	9.5	9.0	N/A	28.0	28.0	3rd
Marcello & Raquel	9.8	10	10	10	10	49.8	9.9	10	9.7	N/A	29.6	29.6	1st
Paloma & Patrick	9.2	9.5	9.8	9.0	9.5	47.0	9.5	9.3	8.9	N/A	27.7	27.7	4th
Giba & Camila	9.5	10	10	9.8	10	49.3	9.8	9.9	9.4	N/A	29.1	29.1	2nd

=== Week 12 ===
Top 6 Redux

- Style: Foxtrot

Aired: October 19, 2014

Judges

Artistic			Technical	
1	2	3	4	5
Massimo Ferrari	Ellen Rocche	Leandro Hassum	Fernanda Chamma	Ivaldo Bertazzo

Running order

Couple	Judges' score					Total score	Average score				Week total	Final total	Result
Couple	1	2	3	4	5	Total score	A	T	S	V	Week total	Final total	Result
Giba & Camila	9.5	9.9	10	9.5	9.1	48.0	9.8	9.3	8.5	9.3	36.9	66.0	4th
Juliana & Átila	9.8	9.9	10	9.5	9.4	48.6	9.9	9.4	8.9	9.8	38.0	66.2	3rd
Lucas & Ana Paula	9.8	9.8	9.8	9.2	9.1	47.7	9.8	9.2	8.8	9.7	37.5	65.1	Deadlock
Giovanna & Rogerio	9.9	9.9	10	9.6	9.5	48.9	9.9	9.6	8.8	9.2	37.5	65.1	Deadlock
Marcello & Raquel	10	9.9	10	9.4	9.2	48.5	10	9.3	9.5	9.6	38.4	68.2	1st
Paloma & Patrick	9.9	9.9	10	10	9.6	49.4	9.9	9.8	9.5	9.6	38.8	66.5	2nd

Deadlock results

Couple	Audience vote
Lucas & Ana Paula	39% to save
Giovanna & Rogerio	61% to save

=== Week 13 ===
Top 5

- Style: Sertanejo

Aired: November 2, 2014

Judges

Artistic			Technical	
1	2	3	4	5
Camila Coutinho	Caio Ribeiro	Fernanda Motta	Caio Nunes	Tania Khalill

Running order

Couple	Judges' score					Total score	Average score				Week total	Final total	Result
Couple	1	2	3	4	5	Total score	A	T	S	V	Week total	Final total	Result
Paloma & Patrick	10	10	10	9.2	9.8	49.0	10	9.5	9.3	9.4	38.2	104.7	3rd
Marcello & Raquel	10	10	10	10	10	50.0	10	10	9.3	9.7	39.0	107.2	1st
Giovanna & Rogerio	10	10	10	9.7	10	49.7	10	10	8.8	9.4	38.2	103.2	5th
Giba & Camila	9.7	9.9	9.8	9.9	9.9	49.2	9.8	9.9	9.2	9.6	38.5	104.5	4th
Juliana & Átila	9.9	9.9	9.9	9.9	9.9	49.5	9.9	9.9	9.4	9.7	38.9	105.1	2nd

=== Week 14 ===
Top 4

- Style: Waltz

Aired: November 9, 2014

Judges

Artistic			Technical	
1	2	3	4	5
Nathalia Dill	Luiz Tripolli	Regina Casé	Marcelo Misailidis	Suely Machado

Running order

Couple	Judges' score					Total score	Average score				Week total	Final total	Result
Couple	1	2	3	4	5	Total score	A	T	S	V	Week total	Final total	Result
Juliana & Átila	9.9	9.9	9.8	9.8	9.7	49.1	9.9	9.8	9.0	9.8	38.5	143.6	2nd
Giba & Camila	9.8	9.8	9.8	9.7	9.6	48.5	9.8	9.7	8.8	9.6	37.9	142.4	Eliminated
Paloma & Patrick	10	9.9	9.9	10	9.9	49.7	9.9	10	9.2	9.5	38.6	143.3	3rd
Marcello & Raquel	10	9.9	10	9.9	9.9	49.7	10	9.9	9.2	9.8	38.9	146.1	1st

=== Week 15 ===
Top 3

- Style: Pasodoble

Aired: November 16, 2014

Judges

Artistic			Technical	
1	2	3	4	5
Astrid Fontenelle	Raphael Viana	Deborah Secco	Carlinhos de Jesus	Marcia Jaqueline

Running order

Couple	Judges' score					Total score	Average score				Week total	Final total	Result
Couple	1	2	3	4	5	Total score	A	T	S	V	Week total	Final total	Result
Marcello & Raquel	9.9	10	10	9.5	9.9	49.3	10	9.7	9.1	9.9	38.7	184.8	1st
Juliana & Átila	9.8	10	10	9.5	9.7	49.0	9.9	9.6	9.1	9.8	38.4	182.0	Eliminated
Paloma & Patrick	10	10	10	10	10	50.0	10	10	9.5	9.8	39.3	182.6	2nd

=== Week 16 ===
Top 2

- Style: Tango & Samba

Aired: November 30, 2014

Judges

Artistic			Technical	
1	2	3	5	6
Letícia Spiller	Artur Xexéo	Paolla Oliveira	Fernanda Chamma	Paulo Gourlart F.
4				
Christiane Torloni

Running order

Tango
Couple	Judges' score			Total score	Average score				Dance total	Final total	Result
Couple	1	2	3	Total score	A	T	S	V	Dance total	Final total	Result
Couple	4	5	6	Total score	A	T	S	V	Dance total	Final total	Result
Marcello & Raquel	9.9	9.9	9.9	58.0	9.9	9.2	9.1	9.9	38.1	38.1	N/A
Marcello & Raquel	10	9.8	8.5	58.0	9.9	9.2	9.1	9.9	38.1	38.1	N/A
Paloma & Patrick	9.9	10	10	59.1	10	9.6	9.1	9.6	38.3	38.3	N/A
Paloma & Patrick	10	9.2	10	59.1	10	9.6	9.1	9.6	38.3	38.3	N/A

Samba
Couple	Judges' score			Total score	Average score				Dance total	Final total	Result
Couple	1	2	3	Total score	A	T	S	V	Dance total	Final total	Result
Couple	4	5	6	Total score	A	T	S	V	Dance total	Final total	Result
Paloma & Patrick	10	10	9.9	58.9	10	9.6	8.8	9.6	38.0	76.3	Runner-up
Paloma & Patrick	9.9	9.4	9.7	58.9	10	9.6	8.8	9.6	38.0	76.3	Runner-up
Marcello & Raquel	10	10	10	59.9	10	10	9.3	9.9	39.2	77.3	Winner
Marcello & Raquel	10	9.9	10	59.9	10	10	9.3	9.9	39.2	77.3	Winner
