= Bertazzo =

Bertazzo is a surname. Notable people with this surname include:

- Ivaldo Bertazzo, Brazilian dancer and choreographer
- Liam Bertazzo (born 1992), Italian cyclist
- Omar Bertazzo (born 1989), Italian cyclist
- Simone Bertazzo (born 1982), Italian bobsledder
