= Eréndira (film) =

1983 film

- Theatrical release poster
- Directed by: Ruy Guerra
- Written by: Gabriel García Márquez
- Produced by: Alain Quefféléan; Regina Ziegler
- Starring: Irene Papas; Cláudia Ohana; Oliver Wehe; Michael Lonsdale
- Cinematography: Denys Clerval
- Edited by: Kenout Peltier
- Music by: Maurice Lecoeur
- Production companies: Les Films du Triangle; Films A2; Ciné Qua Non; Atlas Saskia Film; Austra
- Distributed by: Miramax
- Release date: 12 September 1983
- Running time: 103 minutes
- Countries: Mexico; France; West Germany
- Languages: Spanish; Portuguese

Eréndira is a 1983 drama film directed by Ruy Guerra. The film script was written by Gabriel García Márquez. The original script actually preceded his novella The Incredible and Sad Tale of Innocent Eréndira and Her Heartless Grandmother published in 1972. The characters of Eréndira and her grandmother had previously appeared in his book One Hundred Years of Solitude (1967). Garcia Marquez recreated the screenplay from memory (the original was lost) for the film. Guerra incorporated elements from another Garcia Marquez story ("Death Constant Beyond Love") to meet his narrative needs in the subplot of Senator Onésimo Sanchez.

The film was an international coproduction involving Mexico, France and West Germany. It was shot in Spanish on locations in San Luis Potosi, Veracruz, Zacatecas and in studios in Mexico. It was entered into the 1983 Cannes Film Festival and was selected as the Mexican entry for the Best Foreign Language Film at the 56th Academy Awards, but was not accepted as a nominee.

== Plot ==
Eréndira, a teenaged girl, lives with her eccentric, heartless grandmother in a vast, gloomy house in a windswept desert region. Exploited by her grandmother, Eréndira must work all day doing household chores, until she sleepwalks due to exhaustion. The grandmother lives in her own world, talking to herself, crying uncontrollably over sentimental French songs, and acting out wild dreams while she sleeps. One day Eréndira is so tired from constant work that she falls asleep without extinguishing the candles. A sudden night wind blows the curtains into the candle flames; the curtains catch fire, and the house burns down to the foundation walls. Miraculously, Eréndira and her grandmother survive.

Having calculated the debt Eréndira owes her for the destruction of her home and belongings, the grandmother decides the only way the girl will be able to repay such a vast amount is through prostitution. Eréndira submits to her fate without protest and the grandmother does not waste time trading Eréndira's virginity to a seedy local merchant for 250 pesos and three days' provisions. When Eréndira resists, the man slaps and rapes her.

Eréndira and her grandmother subsequently travel through the desert while the young girl sells her body to countless men – peasants, Indians, humble workers, soldiers and smugglers that populate the region. The grandmother collects the money, makes all the decisions, and pays the Indian servants. As the business prospers it achieves carnivalesque proportions: the two women are joined by hangers-on, vendors, musicians, and a mysterious photographer.

One day, having had sex with an army of soldiers, Eréndira falls sick and the line of men waiting outside her tent is dismissed. Then, Ulises, the young son of a smuggler traveling through the region, sneaks into the tent after the old woman has gone to sleep. Eréndira finds him charming; she charges him for her services and teaches him how to make love. By the next morning Ulises has fallen in love with her.

En route from one town to the next, a group of monks abduct Eréndira, in an attempt to save her from her grandmother's predations. The grandmother swears to the monks that she will get her granddaughter back. The monks send her to their mission in the desert, where Eréndira works alongside other young girls. Eventually, all the girls are commanded to marry, to purify their souls. Eréndira's grandmother hires a Mexican peasant boy to marry Eréndira and after she is freed, she returns to her grandmother and resumes her sexual servitude. To undermine any further attempts by the priests to confiscate her money-making resource, the grandmother schemes to obtain a letter from someone important testifying to her granddaughter's high moral character. The grandmother sends Eréndira to Senator Onésimo Sanchez, a man dying of some mysterious disease. The crafty woman locks a chastity belt on Eréndira, which the Senator discovers cannot be unlocked until he writes the letter.

The grandmother's business suffers a second setback when Ulises reappears and persuades Eréndira to run off with him. His plan is to live off a fortune from oranges which contain diamonds smuggled by his Dutch father. Before they flee, the photographer warns them about bad omens. The young couple head for the border in a truck stolen from the boy's father. They are chased by local police, the grandmother, and the father of Ulises. One of the officers shoots the photographer, who is accused by the grandmother of being an accomplice to the escape. When the couple are finally caught, Eréndira watches from the truck as her lover suffers a whipping from his father. To prevent further escape attempts, the grandmother chains Eréndira to the bed. However, the town's angry prostitutes, bereft of business because the local men want Eréndira, march to their competitor's tent and haul the young woman out of it over the old woman's curses.

By now the Grandmother is quite wealthy. She and Eréndira live by the sea in a large tent, furnished even more grandly than the lost desert home. The old woman plays her piano, bathes, and gives orders to her now hardened charge. Realizing that only her grandmother's death would free her, Eréndira pushes Ulises to kill the old woman. His first two attempts on her life by poisoning and an explosive are unsuccessful. Finally, goaded by Eréndira, he picks up a kitchen knife and stabs the old woman in the back. With his grandmother's death, Eréndira's palm suddenly acquires lines. She picks up her grandmother's vest of gold and runs off into the desert, leaving Ulises behind in tears. "No voice on earth could stop me," Eréndira tells us in a voiceover as she disappears into the desert. "And no trace of my misfortune was ever found."

== Cast ==
- Irene Papas as the grandmother
- Cláudia Ohana as Eréndira
- Michael Lonsdale as Senator Onésimo Sanchez
- Oliver Wehe as Ulysses
- Rufus as the photographer
- Blanca Guerra as Ulysses' mother
- Ernesto Gómez Cruz as the grocer
- Pierre Vaneck as Ulysses' father
- Carlos Cardán as Smuggler
- Humberto Elizondo as Blacaman
- Jorge Fegán as the commander
- Francisco Mauri as the postman
- Sergio Calderón as the truck driver
- Martín Palomares as escort
- Salvador Garcini as puppet-player

== See also ==
- List of submissions to the 56th Academy Awards for Best Foreign Language Film
- List of Mexican submissions for the Academy Award for Best Foreign Language Film
