= Portugal S.A. =

2004 film

- Directed by: Ruy Guerra
- Written by: Alberto Fernandes
- Produced by: Tino Navarro
- Starring: Diogo Infante
- Cinematography: Amílcar Carrajola
- Release date: 16 January 2004
- Running time: 95 minutes
- Country: Portugal
- Language: Portuguese

Portugal S.A. is a 2004 Portuguese drama film directed by Ruy Guerra. It was entered into the 26th Moscow International Film Festival.

== Cast ==
- Diogo Infante as Jacinto Pereira Lopes
- Cristina Câmara as Fátima Resende
- Henrique Viana as Alexandre Boaventura
- Ana Bustorff as Rosa Pereira Lopes
- Luís Madureira as Father Francisco
- Cristina Carvalhal as Maria Helena
- Cândido Ferreira as Fernando Oliveira
- Maria do Céu Guerra as Mother of Jacinto
- João Reis as João Nuno Menezes
- João Vaz as Pedro Castelo Branco
- F. Pedro Oliveira as Paulo Magalhães
