= Cláudia Ohana =

Brazilian actress and singer

Maria Cláudia Silva Carneiro
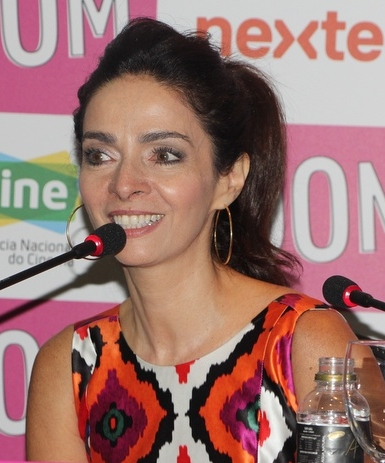
- Cláudia Ohana in 2016
- Born: Maria Cláudia Silva Carneiro; February 6, 1963 (age 63); Rio de Janeiro, Brazil
- Other name: Cláudia Ohana
- Occupations: Actress; singer
- Years active: 1978–present
- Spouse: Ruy Guerra (m. 1981; div. 1984)
- Children: 1

Maria Cláudia Silva Carneiro (born February 6, 1963), known professionally as Cláudia Ohana (after the maternal surname of her mother, Nazareth Ohana Silva), is a Brazilian actress and singer of Portuguese and Jewish origin. In Brazil, she is best known for portraying the vampire Natasha in the 1991's telenovela Vamp, and also the wicked villain Isabela Ferreto in the 1995's A Próxima Vítima, however worldwide she is famous for her portrayal of Eréndira in the eponymous 1983 film.

== Biography ==
She is the daughter of film maker Nazareth Ohana Silva, who died in 1978, and the painter Arthur José Carneiro. She has an older sister named Cristina and is half-sister of the writer João Emanuel Carneiro.

== Personal life ==
Despite being the daughter of the film maker Nazareth Ohana, Cláudia was raised by her maternal aunt, Denise Ohana.

She was married to filmmaker Ruy Guerra between 1981 and 1984, with whom she had a daughter, named Dandara Guerra, born on October 10, 1983, also an actress. Cláudia is Martim's grandmother, born on May 24, 2005, and Arto, born on August 19, 2012, son of Dandara with the actor Álamo Facó. Cláudia is also the aunt of singer Bárbara Ohana.

She posed naked for Playboy for the first time in February 1985 and again in November 2008. Her 1985 essay became historic for showing a hairy pubis, a first even for the time. Recently, in a participation in the Amor e Sexo program, Cláudia joked about the subject, stating that, "to the frustration of many, I shave".

In July, 2020, Cláudia received widespread criticism from animal lovers for having adopted two dogs from a dog-rescue organization, then returning them only a few months later because she no longer wanted to care for them.

She practices Transcendental Meditation and yoga.

== Career ==
=== Television ===
| Year | Title | Role | Notes |
|---|---|---|---|
| 1981 | Obrigado, Doutor | | Episode: "Uma Bela Adormecida" |
| 1981 | Amizade Colorida | Regina | Episode: "Gatinhas e Gatões" |
| 1984 | Amor com Amor Se Paga | Mariana Correia | |
| 1989 | Tieta | Tieta Esteves Cantarelli (young) | Episode: "August 14, 1989" |
| 1990 | Rainha da Sucata | Paula Ramos (Paulinha) | |
| 1990 | Les cavaliers aux yeux verts | Juana-Maria | TV movie |
| 1991 | Vamp | Natasha Rebelo / Eugênia Queiroz | |
| 1993 | Fera Ferida | Camila | |
| 1995 | A Próxima Vítima | Isabela Ferreto de Vasconcellos Rossi | |
| 1996 | Você Decide | Magda | Episode: "Marcas do Passado" |
| 1997 | Zazá | Maria Olímpia | |
| 1998 | Você Decide | | Episode: "A Volta Por Cima" |
| 1998 | Mulher | Cecília | Episode: "Compulsão" |
| 1999 | O Belo e as Feras | | Episode: "Antes Mal Acompanhado do Que Só" |
| 1999 | Você Decide | | Episode: "Assunto de Família" |
| 1999 | Mulher | Graça | Episode: "Dormindo com o Inimigo" |
| 2000 | A Muralha | Dona Antônia Brites | |
| 2000 | Você Decide | Carol | Episode: "Mania de Casar" |
| 2001 | Estrela-Guia | Glória (Glorinha) | Special participation |
| 2001 | As Filhas da Mãe | Orora Gutierrez (Aurora) | |
| 2003 | Canavial de Paixões | Débora Fabermann Santos | Episodes: "October 13–15, 2003" |
| 2004 | Da Cor do Pecado | Zuleide | Episodes: "July 5–August 27, 2004" |
| 2004 | Sob Nova Direção | Lucinda | Episode: "Aqueles Dias" |
| 2006 | Malhação | Raquel Valença | Seasons 13–14 |
| 2008 | A Favorita | Maria Aparecida Marelo Copola (Cida) | |
| 2011 | Morde & Assopra | Alzira Sampaio | Special participation |
| 2011 | Natália | Maria Isabel | |
| 2011 | Cordel Encantado | Siá Benvinda Aráujo | |
| 2012 | Malhação Conectados | Iara | Season 19; Special participation |
| 2012 | Dança dos Famosos 9 | Participant | Domingão do Faustão's reality show |
| 2012 | Guerra dos Sexos | Rihanna | Episodes: "October 27–30, 2012" |
| 2012 | Mandrake | Esther Levi | TV movie |
| 2012 | Mandrake | Esther Levi | Episode: "Robin Hood de Copacabana"; Episode: "A Investigação" |
| 2013 | Louco por Elas | Pâmela | Episode: "O Melhor Dia das Mães de Todos" |
| 2013 | Joia Rara | Laura Passos | |
| 2014 | Psi | Valentina | Seasons 1–2 |
| 2016 | Criança Esperança | Natasha (of Vamp) / Herself | Special participation |
| 2016 | Sol Nascente | Loretta Fragoso | |
| 2017 | Aldo: Mais Forte que o Mundo | Rocilene da Silva Oliveira | |
| 2017 | Super Chef Celebridades | Participant | Mais Você's reality show |
| 2018 | Desnude | Débora | Episode: "Tirando Onda" |
| 2019 | Verão 90 | Janice | |
| 2023 | Vai na Fé | Dora Lorenzo | |
| 2025 | The Masked Singer Brasil | Tieta (character from Tieta) | Season 5 |

=== Film ===
| Year | Title | Role | Notes |
|---|---|---|---|
| 1979 | Amor e Traição | | |
| 1981 | Bonitinha mas Ordinária ou Otto Lara Rezende | sister of Ritinha | |
| 1982 | Menino do Rio | Soninha | |
| 1982 | Beijo na Boca | Celeste | |
| 1982 | Aventuras de um Paraíba | Branca | |
| 1983 | Erêndira | Erêndira | |
| 1986 | Les Longs Manteaux | Julia Mendez | |
| 1986 | Ópera do Malandro | Ludmila Struedel | |
| 1988 | Luzia Homem | Luzia | |
| 1988 | Love Dream | Lisa | |
| 1988 | Fábula de la bella Palomera | Fulvia | |
| 1989 | Kuarup | Vanda | |
| 1989 | Desejo de Amar | | |
| 1994 | Erotique | | segment "Final Call" |
| 2005 | Dolores | Dolores | Short film |
| 2011 | Desenrola | Clara | |
| 2011 | Prime Time Soap | Dora Dias | |
| 2013 | O Bacanal do Diabo e Outras Fitas Proibidas de Ivan Cardoso | Simone | |
| 2013 | A História do Olho | Simone | Short film |
| 2014 | El Misterio de la Felicidad | Casandra | |
| 2015 | Zoom | Alice | |
| 2016 | The Hand of the Creator | Mysterious Woman | |
| 2016 | Stronger than the World | Rocilene da Silva Oliveira | |
