= Amélia (film) =

2001 film by Ana Carolina

- Theatrical release poster
- Directed by: Ana Carolina
- Screenplay by: Ana Carolina; José Antônio Pinheiro
- Produced by: Jaime A. Schwartz
- Starring: Marília Pêra; Béatrice Agenin; Camilla Amado; Pedro Bismark; Alice Borges; Marcélia Cartaxo
- Cinematography: Rodolfo Sánchez
- Edited by: Ademir Francisco
- Music by: Nelson Ayres; David Carbonara; Pedro Herculano
- Production companies: Crystal Cinematográfica; Tuinho Schwartz Productions
- Distributed by: Riofilme
- Release date: 2001 (Biarritz)
- Running time: 130 minutes
- Country: Brazil
- Language: Portuguese
- Box office: R$140,283

Amélia is a 2001 Brazilian comedy-drama film directed by Ana Carolina, inspired by the visit of French actress Sarah Bernhardt to Brazil, in 1905. In the film, the actress is under a professional and personal crisis, but is induced by her Brazilian housekeeper, Amélia, to start performing in Rio de Janeiro. However, the actress is forced to live with the exotic sisters of Amélia.

Ana Carolina had already written the screenplay for the film in 1989, but does not produced due to lack of money. It was shot in Pernambuco and Rio de Janeiro. It debuted at the Biarritz Film Festival where Béatrice Agenin won the best actress award. The film received three nominations at the Grande Prêmio do Cinema Brasileiro in the categories of best actress, for Miriam Muniz, best screenplay and best art direction.

== Cast ==
- Marília Pêra as Amélia
- Béatrice Agenin as Sarah Bernhardt
- Camilla Amado as Oswalda
- Pedro Bismark
- Alice Borges as Maria Luiza
- Marcélia Cartaxo
- Betty Gofman as Vicentine
- Xuxa Lopes
- Duda Mamberti
- Miriam Muniz as Francisca
- Otávio Terceiro as Otávio III
- Cristina Pereira
- Pedro Paulo Rangel
