= O Inventor de Sonhos =

2012 film directed by Ricardo Nauenberg

- Directed by: Ricardo Nauenberg
- Written by: Adriana Falcão; Ricardo Nauenberg
- Starring: Ícaro Silva; Miguel Thiré; Sheron Menezzes; Catarina Abdala; Edmilson Barros
- Release dates: 8 October 2012 (Rio de Janeiro); 11 October 2013
- Running time: 110 minutes
- Country: Brazil
- Language: Portuguese

O Inventor de Sonhos is a 2012 Brazilian drama film directed by Ricardo Nauenberg. The film was released in Brazil on October 11, 2013.

The film is set in Rio de Janeiro in 1808 and follows the vision of two boys: an Afro-Brazilian, son of a slave, and a young European adventurer in search for his real father.

== Cast ==
- Ícaro Silva as José Trazimundo
- Miguel Thiré as Luís Bernardo
- Sheron Menezzes as Iaínha
- Ricardo Blat as Vilaça
- Roberto Bonfim as Eustáquio
- Miguel de Oliveira as José Trazimundo
- Stênio Garcia as Aristides
- Guilhermina Guinle as Laura Leonor
- Sérgio Mamberti as Duke of Alva
