= Camilla Amado =

Brazilian actress and teacher (1938–2021)

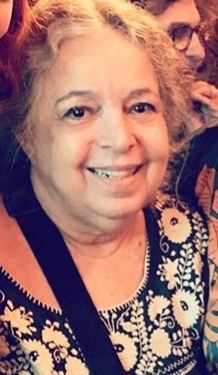
- Amado in 2020
- Born: Camilla de Hollanda Amado; 7 August 1938; Rio de Janeiro, Brazil
- Died: 6 June 2021 (aged 82)
- Spouse: Stepan Nercessian

Camilla de Hollanda Amado, whose stage name was Camilla Amado (7 August 1938 – 6 June 2021) was a Brazilian actress and teacher. She was the daughter of educator Henriette Amado and Gilson Amado, founder of the defunct television station Televisão Educativa, and a distant relative of writer Jorge Amado.

Amado debuted in film in the 1970s. For her performance in the movie The Wedding, directed by Arnaldo Jabor in 1975 and based on the eponymous work of Nelson Rodrigues, Amado won the Kikito Gold award for Best Supporting Actress and the Special Jury Prize at the Gramado Festival.

Amado was married to actor Stepan Nercessian for fourteen years.

== Television ==
- 1972 – Time to Live
- 1978 – The Leaping Cat – Sofia
- 1982 – Summer Sun – Noêmia
- 1982 – Chico Anysio Show – Jose Maria
- 2003 – The House of the Seven Women – Aunt Angela
- 2004 – Heavy Load – Joaquina
- 2006 – Yellow Woodpecker Ranch – Queen Linden
- 2007 – The Big Family – Dona Isaltina
- 2009 – Aline (first season) – Dona Rosa
- 2009 – Task Force – Leonor
- 2010 – Task Force – Leonor
- 2011 – Task Force – Leonor
- 2011 – Cordel Encantado – Zefa
- 2011 – Aline – Dona Rosa
- 2012 – Eternal Love Love – Dona Olga
- 2016 – Ligações Perigosas (TV mini-series) – Madre
- 2017 – The Big Catch (TV mini-series) – Dona Marieta
- 2019 – Topíssima – Zilá da Silva

== Film ==
- 1969 – A Taste of Bitter Feast
- 1975 – Who's Afraid of Werewolf? – Iracema
- 1975 – The Wedding
- 1980 – Partner Adventure
- 1995 – The Girls – Mother Alix
- 1998 – Abolition – Princess Isabel
- 2000 – Amélia – Oswalda
- 2001 – Condemned to Freedom
- 2001 – Copacabana – Miloca
- 2008 – The Desafinados – Landlady
- 2009 – Veronica – D. Rita
- 2010 – Me and My Umbrella – D. Nene
- 2012 – Prime Time Soap – Maria
- 2015 – Cinzento e Negro – Armanda
