= Kuarup (film) =

1989 film

- Theatrical release poster
- Directed by: Ruy Guerra
- Written by: Ruy Guerra; Rudy Langemann
- Based on: Quarup by Antônio Callado
- Produced by: Roberto Fonseca; Paulo Brito; Ruy Guerra
- Starring: Taumaturgo Ferreira; Fernanda Torres
- Cinematography: Edgar Moura
- Edited by: Mair Tavares
- Music by: Egberto Gismonti
- Production companies: Grapho Filmes; Guerra Filmes
- Distributed by: Grapho Filmes; Art Films
- Release date: 18 May 1989
- Running time: 119 minutes
- Country: Brazil
- Language: Portuguese

Kuarup is a 1989 Brazilian drama film directed by Ruy Guerra. It was filmed at the Xingu National Park, Mato Grosso, and in Recife, Pernambuco.

== Cast ==
- Taumaturgo Ferreira as Nando
- Fernanda Torres as Francisca
- Cláudio Mamberti as Ramiro
- Umberto Magnani as Fontoura
- Ewerton de Castro
- Roberto Bonfim
- Cláudia Raia as Sônia
- Rui Resende as Hosana
- Dionísio Azevedo as D. Anselmo
- Cláudia Ohana as Vanda
- Maitê Proença as Maureen
- Lucélia Santos as Lídia
- Ruy Polanah as Manoel Tropeiro
- Cláudio Ferrario as Vidigal
- Mauro Mendonça as Gouveia, minister
- Stênio Garcia as Colonel Ibiratinga
- Maurício Mattar as Levindo

== Reception ==
Kuarup received three special awards at the 15th Festival de Cine Iberoamericano de Huelva. It was entered into the 1989 Cannes Film Festival.
