= Hard Times (1988 film) =

- British theatrical poster
- Directed by: João Botelho
- Written by: João Botelho; Charles Dickens
- Produced by: João Botelho
- Starring: Henrique Viana
- Cinematography: Elso Roque
- Edited by: João Botelho
- Music by: António Pinho Vargas
- Distributed by: Instituto Português de Cinema (IPC); Artificial Eye
- Release dates: 29 August 1988 (Venice); 30 September 1988
- Running time: 90 minutes
- Country: Portugal
- Language: Portuguese

Hard Times (Portuguese: Tempos Difíceis) is a 1988 Portuguese film adaptation of the 1854 novel by Charles Dickens, directed by João Botelho. However, the story is set in modern times. The film was selected as the Portuguese entry for the Best Foreign Language Film at the 61st Academy Awards, but was not accepted as a nominee.

== Cast ==
- Henrique Viana as José Grandela
- Júlia Britton as Luisa Cremalheira
- Eunice Muñoz as Mrs. Vilaverde
- Ruy Furtado as Tomaz Cremalheira
- Isabel de Castro as Teresa Cremalheira
- Joaquim Mendes as Sebastião
- Isabel Ruth as Sebastião's Wife

== See also ==
- List of submissions to the 61st Academy Awards for Best Foreign Language Film
- List of Portuguese submissions for the Academy Award for Best Foreign Language Film
