= MMA - Meu Melhor Amigo =

- Theatrical release poster
- Directed by: José Alvarenga Júnior
- Screenplay by: Marcos Mion; Paulo Cursino
- Story by: Marcos Mion
- Produced by: Daniela Busoli; Leonardo Lessa Lopes
- Starring: Marcos Mion; Guilherme Tavares; Antônio Fagundes
- Cinematography: André Faccioli
- Edited by: Joana Collier
- Music by: Apollo Nove
- Production companies: Formata; Star Original Productions; Globo Filmes
- Distributed by: Star Distribution
- Release date: 16 January 2025
- Running time: 120 minutes
- Country: Brazil
- Language: Portuguese
- Box office: R$1,773,059.10

MMA - Meu Melhor Amigo is a 2025 Brazilian sports comedy-drama film directed by José Alvarenga Júnior and starring Marcos Mion, Antônio Fagundes, and Guilherme Tavares. The screenplay was written by Paulo Cursino and Marcos Mion himself, and it was produced by Formata Produções e Conteúdo in partnership with Star Original Productions and Globo Filmes.

The plot tells the story of a renowned MMA champion who finds himself at the end of his career after suffering an injury. He feels lost after his eight-year-old son is diagnosed with autism and must fight to understand his son while also attempting a triumphant return to his career. The movie also features performances by Andréia Horta, Augusto Madeira, Vanessa Giácomo, Welder Rodrigues, and Lúcio Mauro Filho in other supporting roles.

The film was released in Brazilian cinemas on January 16, 2025, and received a lukewarm reception from specialized critics. It was considered a "great tool for the social inclusion debate" and a didactic and thoughtful film that aims to raise awareness about autism. Despite the mixed critical reception, the film was commercially successful, grossing over R$1.7 million in total box office revenue.

== Plot ==
Max Machadada, a renowned MMA champion, faces the end of his career after a severe shoulder injury. He discovers he has an 8-year-old autistic son, a revelation that forces him to re-evaluate his life. Max must now navigate two challenges: understanding his son and preparing for one final, career-defining fight. The film explores his journey of redemption and self-discovery as he learns to be both a fighter in the ring and a father to his son.

== Cast ==
- Marcos Mion as Marcelo Fontana/Max Machadada
- Guilherme Tavares as Bruno Fontana
- Antônio Fagundes as Fred Fontana
- Andréia Horta as Laís Almeida
- Hoji Fortuna as Michel Gomes
- Laura Luz as Naomi Gomes
- Augusto Madeira as Fabiano
- Vanessa Giácomo as Mariana
- Lúcio Mauro Filho as Jorge Leite
- Welder Rodrigues as Everaldo Mascarenhas
- Thiago Voltolini as Felipe (Flip)
- Reeh Augusto as Railson
- Marjorie Geraldi as Sandra

== Production ==
=== Conception and development ===
The film is directly inspired by Marcos Mion's life and his relationship with his son, Romeo. The script incorporates personal elements from Mion's past, such as a scene where the character Max smells his son's head while he sleeps. This specific detail is based on a real-life experience and forms a key part of the on-screen relationship between Max and his son, Bruno.

In collaboration with director José Alvarenga, Mion aimed to develop a character distinct from his public persona. The team continuously refined scenes and dialogue to ensure Max's authenticity. Initially conceived as a current champion, the character was later changed to a former champion who had been out of the ring for five years, a decision that aligned with Mion's age and appearance. A shoulder injury, which limits Max's fighting ability, was also added to the script. This plot point was included to reflect Mion's own physical limitations, reinforcing the film's theme of personal and professional struggle.

== Release ==
Its premiere at the Festival do Rio took place on October 11, 2024, and it was released in cinemas in Brazil on January 16, 2025.

== Reception ==
=== Box office ===
MMA - Meu Melhor Amigo had a positive reception at the box office. According to Comscore, during its opening weekend from January 16–19, 2024, the film debuted in 10th place among the most-watched films in Brazilian cinemas. It drew an audience of approximately 45,740 people, generating over R$1 million in revenue. Over its 35-day commercial run, the film accumulated a total audience of 89,605 people, with a total box office revenue of R$1,773,059.10, as reported by the Brazilian National Cinema Agency (Ancine).

=== Critical response ===
In her review for CinePOP, Janda Montenegro rated the film 3.5 out of 5, calling it a "great tool for the debate on social inclusion." Camila Gomes of Rolling Stone Brasil described it as "didactic and affectionate," noting that it "raises awareness about autism." Conversely, Alessandro Lo-Bianco, writing for his blog on iG, described MMA - Meu Melhor Amigo as a "frustrating experience." He stated that the film "fails to build any emotional connection with the audience," largely due to Marcos Mion's "exaggerated and artificial" performance, which he found unengaging. Lo-Bianco argued that the film prioritizes showcasing the protagonist's physique over exploring the emotional challenges of fatherhood and the complexities of living with autism. He concluded by calling the film "not just bad, but terrible," and stated that it "wastes a relevant theme and delivers a result that is below expectations in all aspects."
