= Of Gods and the Undead =

1970 film

- Directed by: Ruy Guerra
- Written by: Ruy Guerra; Flávio Império; Paulo José
- Produced by: Paulo José; César Thedim
- Starring: Norma Bengell
- Cinematography: Dib Lutfi
- Edited by: Ruy Guerra
- Release date: June 1970
- Running time: 97 minutes
- Country: Brazil
- Language: Portuguese

Of Gods and the Undead (Portuguese: Os Deuses e os Mortos) is a 1970 Brazilian drama film directed by Ruy Guerra. It was entered into the 20th Berlin International Film Festival.

== Cast ==
- Norma Bengell - Soledad
- Othon Bastos - The Man
- Ítala Nandi - Sereno
- Nelson Xavier - Valu
- Ruy Polanah - Urbano
- Jorge Chaia - Colonel Santana
- Freddy Kleemann - Man in White
- Mara Rúbia - Prostitute
- Milton Nascimento - Dim Dum
