= Filhas de Eva =

- Genre: Comedy drama
- Created by: Adriana Falcão; Jô Abdu; Martha Mendonça; Nelito Fernandes
- Written by: Jô Abdu; Martha Mendonça; Nelito Fernandes; Maria Clara Mattos
- Directed by: Leonardo Nogueira; Felipe Louzada; Nathalia Ribas
- Starring: Renata Sorrah; Giovanna Antonelli; Vanessa Giácomo; Dan Stulbach; Marcos Veras; Débora Ozório; Cacá Amaral
- Opening theme: "Your Hands" by GRAE
- Composers: Nani Palmeira; Rafael Langoni
- Country of origin: Brazil
- Original language: Portuguese
- No. of seasons: 1
- No. of episodes: 12

Production
- Producer: Isabel Telles Ribeiro
- Production location: Rio de Janeiro
- Cinematography: André Horta
- Editor: Ghynn Paul
- Running time: 37–47 minutes
- Production company: Estúdios Globo

Original release
- Network: Globoplay
- Release: 8 March 2021

Filhas de Eva (English title: A Woman's Fate) is a Brazilian streaming television series created by Adriana Falcão, Jô Abdu, Martha Mendonça and Nelito Fernandes for Globoplay. Directed by Leonardo Nogueira, Felipe Louzada and Nathalia Ribas, and produced by TV Globo’s production division Estúdios Globo, it premiered on the streaming service on 8 March 2021. It stars Renata Sorrah, Giovanna Antonelli, Vanessa Giácomo, Dan Stulbach, Marcos Veras, Débora Ozório, and Cacá Amaral.

== Plot ==
The series tells the story of three women who are trapped in standards that do not make them happy. Stella (Renata Sorrah) realizes during her 50th wedding anniversary that she did not enjoy life as she should have and repeated the fate of her generation, she gave up dreams for marriage and motherhood. Lívia (Giovanna Antonelli), Stella's daughter, has her career, but suffers from not being in control of the emotional life she idealized. Cléo (Vanessa Giácomo) with her low self-esteem, needs to guarantee a roof and survival before thinking about any personal achievement. Meanwhile, Dora (Debora Ozório), Stella's granddaughter and Lívia's daughter, struggles between family role models and the feminism of today's young women. Stella makes an unexpected decision that changes the lives of everyone around her.

== Cast ==
=== Main ===
- Renata Sorrah as Stella Roman Fantini
- Giovanna Antonelli as Lívia Fantini Caldas
- Vanessa Giácomo as Cleópatra "Cléo" Ramos de Souza
- Dan Stulbach as Kléber Caldas
- Marcos Veras as Fábio Ferreira
- Débora Ozório as Dora Fantini Caldas
- Cacá Amaral as Ademar Lopes Fantini

=== Recurring ===
- Analu Prestes as Maria José "Zezé" Ramos de Souza
- Erom Cordeiro as Júlio César Ramos de Souza
- Cecília Homem de Mello as Catarina Weinermann
- Jean Pierre Noher as Joaquim Benitez
- Juliano Lobreiro as Gui
- Nina Tomsic as Mari
- Aldo Perrota as Luís Fernando
- Bia Guedes as Jurema

=== Guest ===
- Fátima Bernardes as herself
- Marcella Rica as young Stella
- Stênio Garcia as Jurandir Sampaio
- Sílvia Salgado as Eleonora Sampaio
- Antônio Pedro as Belardo
- Thaíssa Carvalho as Babi
- Lorena Comparato as Suzana
- Milton Gonçalves as Gasparian
- Malu Valle as Maria Lúcia Junqueira
