= Vanessa Giácomo =

Brazilian actress

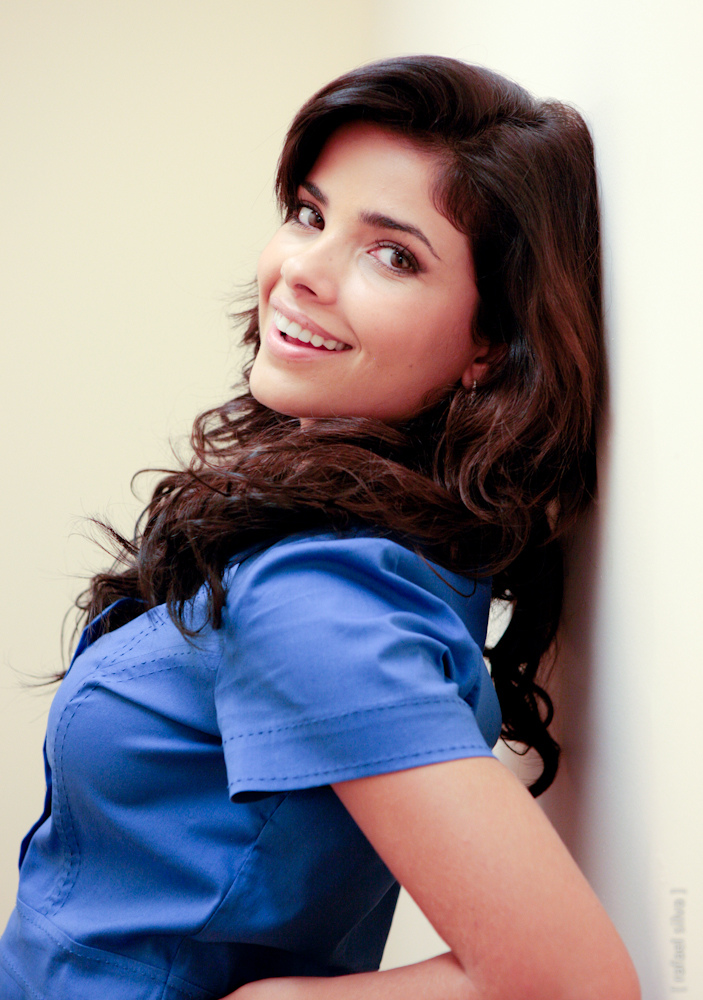
- Giácomo in 2011
- Born: 29 March 1983 (age 42); Volta Redonda, Rio de Janeiro, Brazil
- Occupation(s): Actress, screenwriter
- Years active: 2002–present
- Spouses: Daniel de Oliveira (m. 2009; div. 2012) Giuseppe Dioguardi (m. 2014)
- Children: 3

Vanessa Mendes da Silva Lima (born 29 March 1983), best known as Vanessa Giácomo, is a Brazilian actress and screenwriter.

== Career ==
Giácomo made her television debut in Cabocla in 2004 at the age of 20, where she met and fell in love with actor Daniel de Oliveira. She appeared with Eriberto Leão in Sinhá Moça in 2006. She and Oliveira married and she gave birth to their first son in January 2008. She resumed work after the birth, filming O Menino da Porteira with singer Daniel, and received an offer to take part in a film on Jean Charles de Menezes, a Brazilian national who was mistaken for a terrorist and shot dead by police in London in 2005. Filming took place in London during 2008.

== Filmography ==
=== Television ===
Year	Title	Role
2002	Malhação	Nanda's Friend
2003	Linha Direta	
2004	Cabocla	Zulmira de Oliveira Vieira Pires "Zuca"
2005	Clara e o Chuveiro do Tempo	Lia
2006	Sinhá Moça	Juliana Castroneves
2007	Amazônia, de Galvez a Chico Mendes	Ilzamar "Ilza" Mendes
2007–2008	Duas Caras	Luciana Alves Negroponte
2009	Paraíso	Rosa "Rosinha"
2009–2010	Caras & Bocas	Miriam Barros
2011	Autor por Autor	Moça Caetana
2011	Morde & Assopra	Celeste de Sousa Sampaio
2012	Gabriela	Malvina Tavares
2013–2014	Amor à Vida	Aline Noronha Khoury
2014	A Mulher da Sua Vida	Fernanda
2014	Império	Eliane Medeiros
2015–2016	A Regra do Jogo	Maria Vitória "Tóia" Noronha/Sofia Mendes de Albuquerque
2017–2018	Pega Pega	Antônia Almeida
2018	O Outro Lado do Paraíso	Taís Ribeiro
2018–2019	O Sétimo Guardião	Stella Aranha
2021	Filhas de Eva	Cleópatra "Cléo" Ramos de Souza
2022	Cara e Coragem	Herself
2022–2023	Travessia	Leonor "Leo" Sampaio
2023	Chuva Negra	Julie
2024	O Jogo que Mudou a História	Marta
2025	Beleza Fatal	Cléonice "Cléo" Fernandes
2025	Vitória	Isabel Nobre

=== Film ===
Year	Title	Role	Notes
2006	Canta Maria	Maria	
2007	Os 12 Trabalhos	Simone	
2008	A Ilha dos Escravos	Maria	
2009	Jean Charles	Vivian	
2009	O Menino da Porteira	Juliana	
2011	Prime Time Soap	Amanda Lima	
2011	Gnomeo & Juliet	Juliet	Voice role; brazilian dubbing
2013	Solidões	Mulher	
2015	Divã a 2	Eduarda	
2016	Rodízio - O Filme	—	Short-film; also screenwriter
2025	MMA - Meu Melhor Amigo	Mariana	
2025	Fé Para o Impossível	Renee Murdoch	

== Awards and nominations ==
Year	Awards	Category	Nominated work	Result
2004	Prêmio Qualidade Brasil	Best Revelation	Cabocla	Won
2004	Melhores do Ano	Melhor Atriz Revelação	Cabocla	Won
2004	Prêmio Extra de Televisão	Melhor Revelação	Cabocla	Won
2004	Prêmio Contigo! de TV	Best Revelation	Cabocla	Won
2004	Prêmio Contigo! de TV	Best Romantic Couple (with Daniel de Oliveira)	Cabocla	Nominated
2006	Prêmio Contigo! de Cinema	Best Actress	Canta Maria	Won
2009	Prêmio Contigo! de Cinema	Best Actress	Jean Charles	Won
2011	Prêmio Extra de Televisão	Best Supporting Actress	Morde & Assopra	Nominated
2011	Queer Lisboa	Best Actress	A Novela das 8	Won
2013	Melhores do Ano	Best Actress	Amor à Vida	Nominated
2013	Prêmio Extra de Televisão	Best Supporting Actress	Amor à Vida	Nominated
2014	Melhores do Ano Minha Novela	Best Actress	Amor à Vida	Won
2014	Troféu Imprensa	Melhor Atriz	Amor à Vida	Won
2014	Troféu Internet	Best Actress	Amor à Vida	Nominated
2014	Prêmio Contigo! de TV	Best Actress	Amor à Vida	Won
2015	Prêmio Extra de Televisão	Best Actress	A Regra do Jogo	Nominated
