= Stênio Garcia =

Brazilian actor (born 1932)

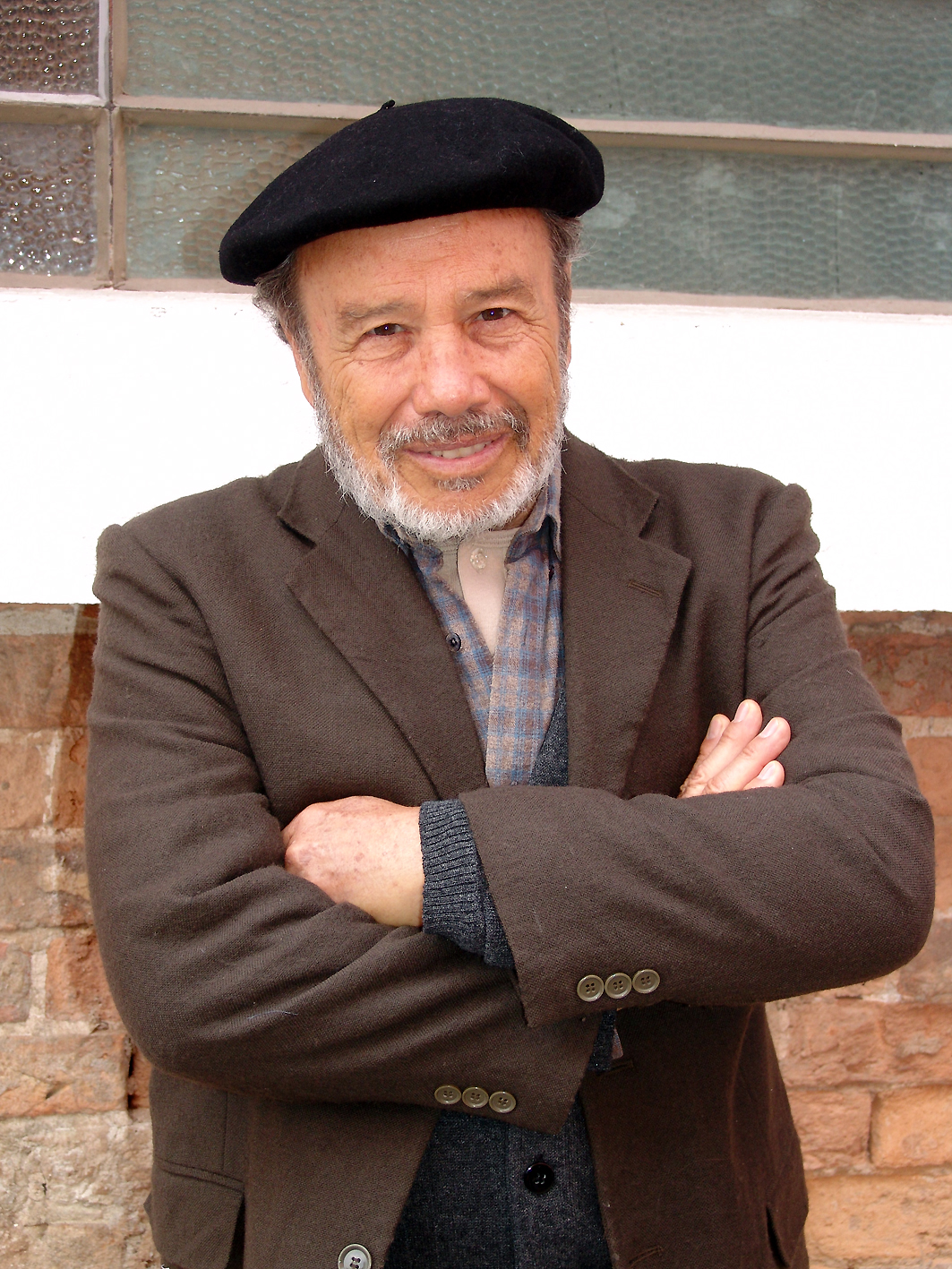
- Garcia in the telenovela O Profeta (2006)
- Born: 28 April 1932 (age 94); Mimoso do Sul, Espírito Santo, Brazil
- Occupation: Actor
- Years active: 1961–present
- Spouses: Cleyde Yáconis (m. 1958; sep. 1969) Clarice Piovesan (div. 1983) Marilene Saade (m. 1998)
- Children: 2

Stênio Garcia Faro (born 28 April 1932) is a Brazilian actor.

== Television ==
- 1966 - As Minas de Prata .... José
- 1967 - Os Fantoches .... Torquato
- 1968 - A Muralha .... Aimbé
- 1968 - O Terceiro Pecado .... Tomás
- 1969 - Dez Vidas .... Silvério dos Reis
- 1969 - Os estranhos .... Daniel
- 1971 - Hospital .... Maurício
- 1972 - Na Idade do Lobo .... Chico
- 1973 - Cavalo de Aço.... Brucutu
- 1973 - O Semideus.... Lorde José
- 1975 - Gabriela.... Felismino
- 1976 - Saramandaia .... Geraldo
- 1979 - Carga Pesada (seriado) .... Bino
- 1981 - O Amor é Nosso .... Leonardo
- 1981 - Terras do Sem Fim .... Amarelo Joaquim
- 1982 - Final Feliz .... Mestre Antônio
- 1983 - Bandidos da Falange (minissérie) .... Lucena
- 1984 - Corpo a Corpo .... Amauri Pelegrini
- 1984 - Padre Cícero .... Padre Cícero
- 1986 - Hipertensão .... Chico
- 1986 - Selva de Pedra .... Pedro
- 1988 - O Pagador de Promessas .... Dedé
- 1989 - O Sexo dos Anjos .... padre Aurélio
- 1989 - Que Rei Sou Eu? .... Corcoran
- 1990 - Rainha da Sucata .... Sérgio
- 1990 - Boca do Lixo .... Ciro
- 1990 - Meu Bem, Meu Mal .... Argemiro
- 1991 - O Dono do Mundo.... Herculano Maciel
- 1992 - De Corpo e Alma .... Domingos Bianchi
- 1993 - O Mapa da Mina .... Pedro Cunha
- 1993 - Agosto .... Ramos
- 1993 - Olho no Olho .... Armando
- 1994 - A Madona de Cedro .... padre Estêvão
- 1994 - Tropicaliente .... Samuel
- 1995 - Engraçadinha... seus amores e seus pecados .... Carlinhos
- 1995 - Decadência .... Tavares Branco Filho
- 1995 - Explode Coração .... Pepe
- 1996 - O Rei do Gado .... Zé do Araguaia
- 1998 - Hilda Furacão (minissérie) .... Tonico Mendes
- 1998 - Labirinto .... Jonas
- 1998 - Torre de Babel .... Bruno Maia
- 2000 - A Muralha .... Caraíba
- 2001 - A Padroeira .... Antônio Cabral
- 2001 - O Clone .... Tio Ali
- 2001 - Os Maias .... Manuel Monforte
- 2002 - Pastores da Noite .... Chalub
- 2003 - Kubanacan .... Rubio Montenegro
- 2003/2007 - Carga Pesada (seriado) .... Bino
- 2005 - Hoje é dia de Maria (microssérie) .... Asmodeu
- 2005 - Hoje é dia de Maria - Segunda Jornada .... Asmodeu
- 2006 - O Profeta .... Jacó de Oliveira
- 2007 - Duas Caras.... Barreto (Paulo de Queirós Barreto)
- 2008 - Ó Paí, Ó .... Seu Jerônimo
- 2009 - Caminho das Índias .... Dr. Castanho
- 2010 - Malhação .... Prof. Ramon (participação especial)
- 2011 - Batendo Ponto .... Nestor
- 2011 - A Vida da Gente .... Laudelino
- 2012 - Salve Jorge .... Artur
- 2021 - Filhas de Eva .... Jurandir Sampaio

== Cinema ==
- 1964 - O vigilante contra o crime
- 1964 - Vereda de salvação
- 1967 - Vigilante em missão secreta
- 1968 - As amorosas
- 1969 - A mulher de todos
- 1970 - A guerra dos pelados
- 1970 - O pornógrafo
- 1973 - Em compasso de espera
- 1975 - Ana, a libertina
- 1976 - O esquadrão da morte
- 1977 - As três mortes de Solano
- 1977 - Morte e vida severina
- 1977 - O crime do Zé Bigorna
- 1978 - Tudo bem
- 1987 - Leila Diniz
- 1989 - Kuarup
- 1989 - Solidão, Uma Linda História de Amor
- 1990 - Mais que a terra
- 1991 - Brincando nos campos do Senhor
- 1997 - Os matadores
- 1998 - Hans Staden
- 1998 - Menino maluquinho 2 - A aventura
- 2000 - Eu, tu, eles
- 2000 - O circo das qualidades humanas
- 2004 - Redentor
- 2005 - Casa de areia
- 2005 - O beijo no asfalto
- 2007 - Ó Paí, Ó
- 2012 - O Inventor de Sonhos
- 2022 - Perlimps
