= Mueda, Memória e Massacre =

Mozambican film 1979

- Release poster
- Directed by: Ruy Guerra
- Produced by: Jacques Schwarztein; Camilo de Sousa
- Starring: Filipe Gumoguacala; Romao Comapoquele; Baltazar Nchulema; Mauricio Machimbuco; Alfredo Mtapumsunji; Cassiamo Camilio; Antonio Jumba
- Cinematography: Ruy Guerra; Fernando Silva; Isac Soclas
- Edited by: Ruy Guerra
- Production company: Instituto Nacional de Cinema de Moçambique
- Distributed by: Hors Champ
- Release date: 1979
- Running time: 80 minutes
- Country: Mozambique
- Languages: Portuguese; Swahili

Mueda, Memória e Massacre (Mueda, Memory and Massacre) is a 1979 Mozambican film directed by Ruy Guerra and considered the country's first feature fiction film. The film captures the annual theatrical re-enactment of the Mueda Massacre of 1960 that left over 600 peaceful protesters dead.

== Synopsis ==
The film depicts a re-enactment of the 1960 Mueda Massacre played by amateur Makonde actors from Mueda that has been re-enacted publicly since independence in 1975. The massacre was a key catalyst for the start of the Mozambican War of Independence and for the formation of FRELIMO.

== Plot ==
A delegation of Mozambican exiles from Tanganyika cross the border and ask the Portuguese administrator for independence. After three delegations arrive and each demand independence the administrator agrees to address their grievances at the public square in the presence of the Provincial Governor. A large crowd gathers and the Governor rejects the request for independence while arresting two of the exiles, Faustino Vamomba and Mateus Waduvani, and sending them away in jeeps. The crowd protests and attempt to stop the jeep from leaving before the soldiers open fire on the crowd.

== Cast ==
- Filipe Gumoguacala as Cometeiro Cassimuca
- Romao Comapoquele as Faustino Vamomba
- Baltazar Nchulema as Tac Tac Mandusse
- Mauricio Machimbuco as Imterprete
- Alfredo Mtapumsunji as Administrador
- Cassiamo Camilio as Aspirante
- Antonio Jumba as Cabo dos Cipauos

== Credits ==
- Director: Ruy Guerra
- Executive Producers: Jacques Schwarztein, Camilo de Sousa
- Cinematography: Ruy Guerra, Fernando Silva
- Camera Assistants: Fernando Silva, Isac Sodas
- Editing: Ruy Guerra
- Editing Assistants: Mario Felix, Moina Forjay, Fernando Silva, Jax, Jose Cabral, Emoque Mate
- Sound Direction: Valente Dimande, Gabriel Mondlande
- Mixing: Ron Hallis
- Drama Director: Calisto dos Lagos
- Documentation: Licínio de Azevedo, Roxo Leao
- Translations: Joao Jonas, Victor Simba
- Scene Photography: Jose Cabral
- Disclosures: Pedro Pimenta
- Placards: Carlos Silva
- Photo Retouching: Edgar Mousa, Antonio Tembe
- Negative Cut: J. Bai Bai
- Poster: D.N.P.P
- Testimonials: Faustimo Vanomba, Mutchamu Tumula, Saide Namuolo, Cristimo Maumda, Baltazar Nchulema, Ernesto TchipaKalia

== Awards ==
The film won awards at various international film festivals including:

- Tashkent Film Festival, 1980
- Berlin International Film Festival, 1981
- Locarno International Film Festival, 1980
