= Sheron Menezzes =

Brazilian actress

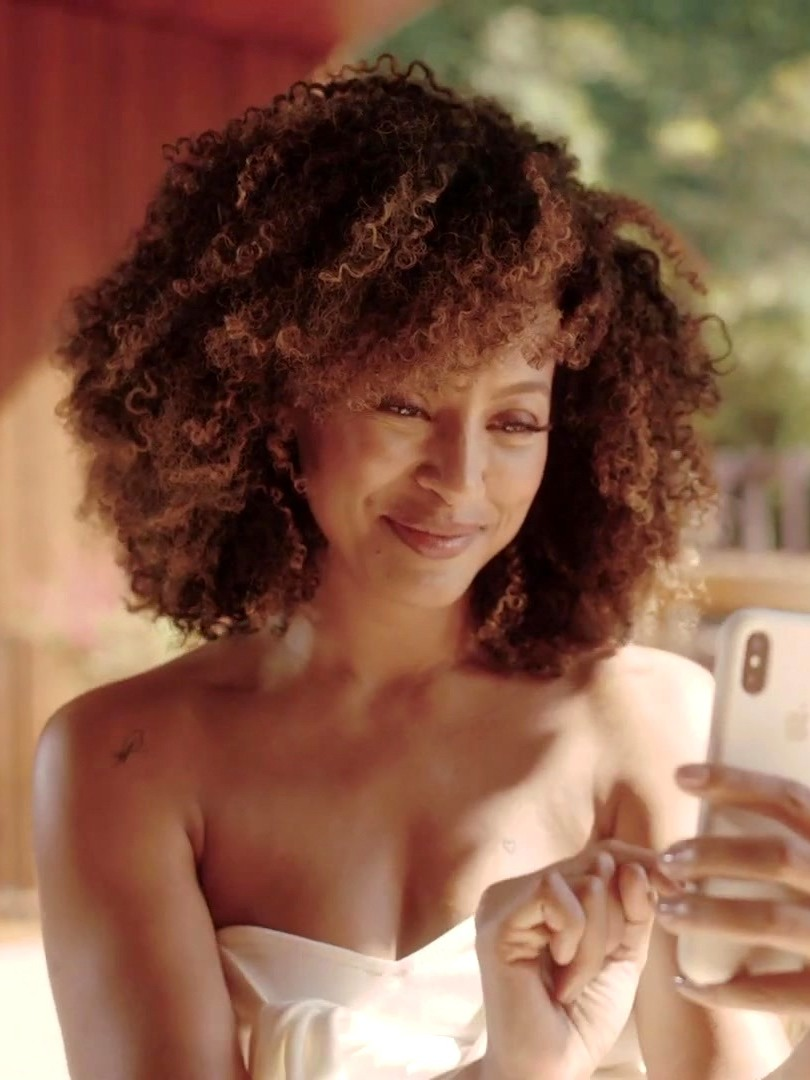
- Menezzes in 2018
- Born: Sheron Mancilha Menezes; 26 November 1983 (age 42); Porto Alegre, Rio Grande do Sul, Brazil
- Occupation: Actress
- Years active: 2002–present
- Spouse: Saulo Camelo (m. 2022)
- Children: 1
- Website: www.sheronmenezes.com.br

Signature
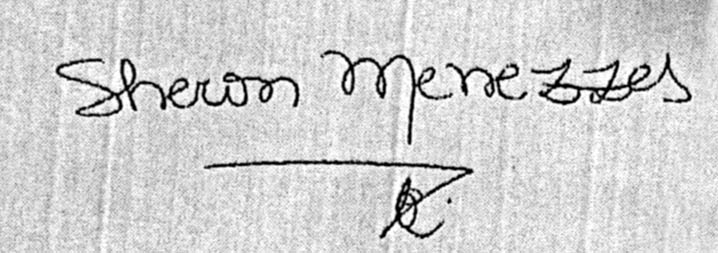

Sheron Mancilha Menezes (Brazilian Portuguese: [ˈʃɛɾõ mɐ̃ˈsiʎɐ meˈnezes]; born 26 November 1983) is a Brazilian actress.

== Career ==
Menezzes starred in the TV Globo soap opera Esperança in April 2002 with the approval of the director Luiz Fernando Carvalho who was impressed with her test and suggested to the author, Benedito Ruy Barbosa, the changing age of the character, Julia, oldest first, so it could be played by newcomer Sheron Menezes. Sheron then won the role of the sweet and stately Julia, illegitimate daughter of Baron coffee, late husband of Frances iron hand, the character of Lúcia Veríssimo, who lived on the farm family as a maid. Julia ends up marrying a stranger, Hornet, played by Ali Jackson. Julia was well received by audiences and ended up yielding to Sheron three awards for his work and an invitation from director Luiz Antonio Pilar to act in the theater.

Between 2007 and 2008, Sheron lived in the novel Duas Caras, the fox Solange Couto Ferreira dos Santos Maciel, daughter of community leader Juvenal Antena (played by Antônio Fagundes). At first, father and daughter maintained a complicated relationship, due to the fact that Juvenal had discovered the existence of daughter only after 20 years. However, the initial differences gave way to joy and mutual affection between the two.

The actress played the character Milena in the telenovela Caras & Bocas (2009-2010), in the range of 19h.

In October 2010, was crowned Queen Sheron battery Portela. In November, announced the addition of a letter "z" in its name, going to sign Sheron Menezzes. In 2011, playing Sarita, will be on the soap opera Aquele Beijo, Miguel Falabella.

In 2012, interprets the envious Berenice in Lado a Lado, first villain of his career. Also in 2012, the actress starred in the movie O Inventor de Sonhos, the first film in the career of the actress.

=== Television ===
Year	Title	Role	Notes
2002	Esperança	Júlia de Silve	
2003	Celebridade	Iara	
2004	Como uma Onda	Rosário	
2005	Belíssima	Dagmar de Sousa	
2007	Amazônia, de Galvez a Chico Mendes	Verônica	
2007	A Diarista	Lucilene	episode: "O Tëu Cabelo Não Nega"
2007	Duas Caras	Solange Couto Ferreira dos Santos Maciel	
2008	Episódio Especial	Herself	Cameo
2008	Casos e Acasos	Júlia	episode: "O Celular"
2008	Casos e Acasos	Rafaela Mendes	episode: "A Câmera Escondida"
2009	Caras & Bocas	Milena Nunes Conti	
2010	Dança dos Famosos 7	Herself	Reality show of Domingão do Faustão
2010	Ti Ti Ti	Herself	Cameo
2011	Aquele Beijo	Sarita de Souza	
2012	Lado a Lado	Berenice	
2013	Além do Horizonte	Keila Machado Martins	
2019	Bom Sucesso	Gisele	
2023	Vai na Fé	Solange "Sol" da Silva Carvalho	

=== Film ===
Year	Title	Role
2012	O Inventor de Sonhos	Iaínha
