= Ruy Guerra =

Portuguese-Brazilian film director and actor (born 1931)

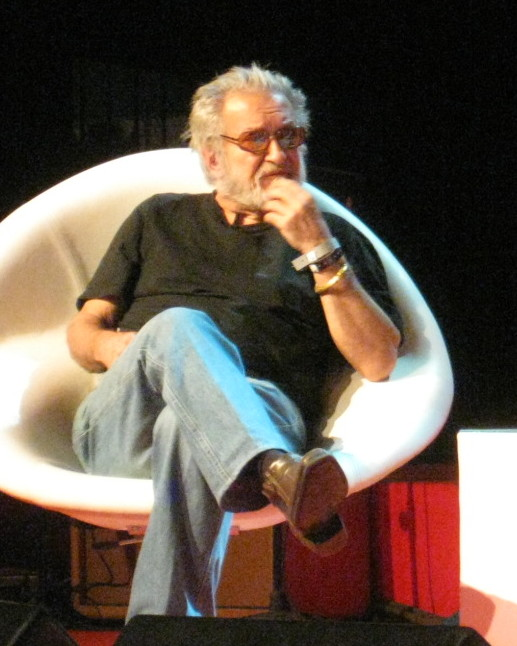
- Guerra in 2010
- Born: Ruy Alexandre Guerra Coelho Pereira; August 22, 1931 (age 94); Lourenço Marques, Portuguese Mozambique (present-day Maputo, Mozambique)
- Citizenship: Portugal; Brazil
- Occupations: Film director; screenwriter
- Years active: 1954–present
- Movement: Cinema Novo
- Spouses: Nara Leão (m. 1962; sep. 1965) Leila Diniz (m. 1971; died 1972) Cláudia Ohana (m. 1981; div. 1984)
- Children: 2

Ruy Alexandre Guerra Coelho Pereira (born August 22, 1931) is a Portuguese-Brazilian film director and screenwriter. Guerra was born a Portuguese citizen in Lourenço Marques (today Maputo) in Mozambique, when it was still a Portuguese colony.

== Biography ==
Guerra studied at IDHEC film school in Paris from 1952. In 1958 he started his career as an assistant director in several French films. He subsequently immigrated to Brazil, where he directed his first feature film, Os Cafajestes (1962). It was entered into the 12th Berlin International Film Festival.

In 1964, Guerra directed Os Fuzis, which placed him in the forefront of the emerging Cinema Novo movement. The film was entered into the 14th Berlin International Film Festival where it won the Silver Bear Extraordinary Jury Prize.

After that he directed the international production Tendres Chasseurs (1969) starring Sterling Hayden, and Os Deuses e os Mortos (1970). The tumultuous political landscape in 1970s Brazil forced Guerra to stop filming until 1976, when he directed A Queda. The film was entered into the 28th Berlin International Film Festival, where it won the Silver Bear – Special Jury Prize.

In 1980 he returned to Mozambique where he shot Mueda, Memória e Massacre, that country's first feature film. While in Mozambique, Guerra shot many short films and helped the creation of the National Institute for Cinema.

In 1982 Guerra shot Eréndira in Mexico, based on the work by Gabriel García Márquez. He also directed the musical comedy A Ópera do Malandro (1985), based on Chico Buarque's free theatrical adaptation of Bertold Brecht's Threepenny Opera; the TV film Os Amores Difíceis, another adaptation of García Márquez; and Kuarup (1989). In 2000 Guerra's Estorvo was nominated for the Golden Palm at the 2000 Cannes Film Festival. It was Guerra's third nomination in the festival, after Erêndira and Kuarup. His 2004 film Portugal S.A. was the only film he did in Portugal and entered into the 26th Moscow International Film Festival.

Guerra has appeared in many films as an actor; he is perhaps best known to international audiences for his performance as the doomed Pedro de Ursúa in Werner Herzog's Aguirre, the Wrath of God (1972).

== Personal life ==
In 1971, Guerra married Brazilian actress Leila Diniz. Diniz was killed the following year in the crash of Japan Airlines Flight 471 in India.

== Filmography ==
Key
†	Indicates a work made for TV	‡	Indicates a short film

List of films directed by Ruy Guerra
Year	Original title	English release title	Language(s)	Notes
1954	Quand Le Soleil Dort ^{‡}		French	French production
1962	Os Cafajestes	The Unscrupulous Ones / The Miscreants / The Hustlers	Portuguese	Guerra's first Brazilian production
1964	Os Fuzis	The Guns	Portuguese	Brazilian–Argentinian co-production
1969	Ternos Caçadores	Sweet Hunters / Jailbird	Portuguese, English	Brazilian–French–Panamanian co-production
1970	Os Deuses e os Mortos	Of Gods and the Undead / Gods and the Dead	Portuguese	
1978	A Queda	The Fall	Portuguese	Co-directed with Nelson Xavier.
1979	Mueda, Memória e Massacre	Mueda, Memory and Massacre	Portuguese	Mozambican production
1981	Histoires extraordinaires ^{‡}		French	French TV series. Director of La lettre volée episode
1981	A Carta Roubada ^{‡}		Portuguese	Portuguese production
1983	Eréndira	Eréndira	Portuguese, Spanish	West German–French–Mexican co-production
1986	Ópera do Malandro	Malandro	Portuguese	Brazilian–French co-production.
1987	Fábula de la Bella Palomera / A Bela Palomera	Fable of the Beautiful Pigeon Fancier	Portuguese	Brazilian–Spanish co-production
1989	Kuarup	Kuarup	Portuguese	
1992	Me Alquilo Para Soñar		Spanish	Cuban–Spanish co-production. TV miniseries, 6 episodes
2000	Monsanto	Monsanto	Portuguese	Portuguese production. TV movie.
2000	Estorvo	Turbulence	Portuguese	Brazilian–Cuban–Portuguese co-production
2004	Portugal S.A.	Portugal S.A.	Portuguese	Portuguese production.
2006	O Veneno da Madrugada	In Evil Hour	Portuguese, Spanish	Brazilian–Argentinian–Portuguese co-production
2018	Quase Memória	Oblivious Memory	Portuguese	

== See also ==
- S.O.S. Noronha (1957)
