= Alex Escobar (presenter) =

Brazilian journalist and presenter

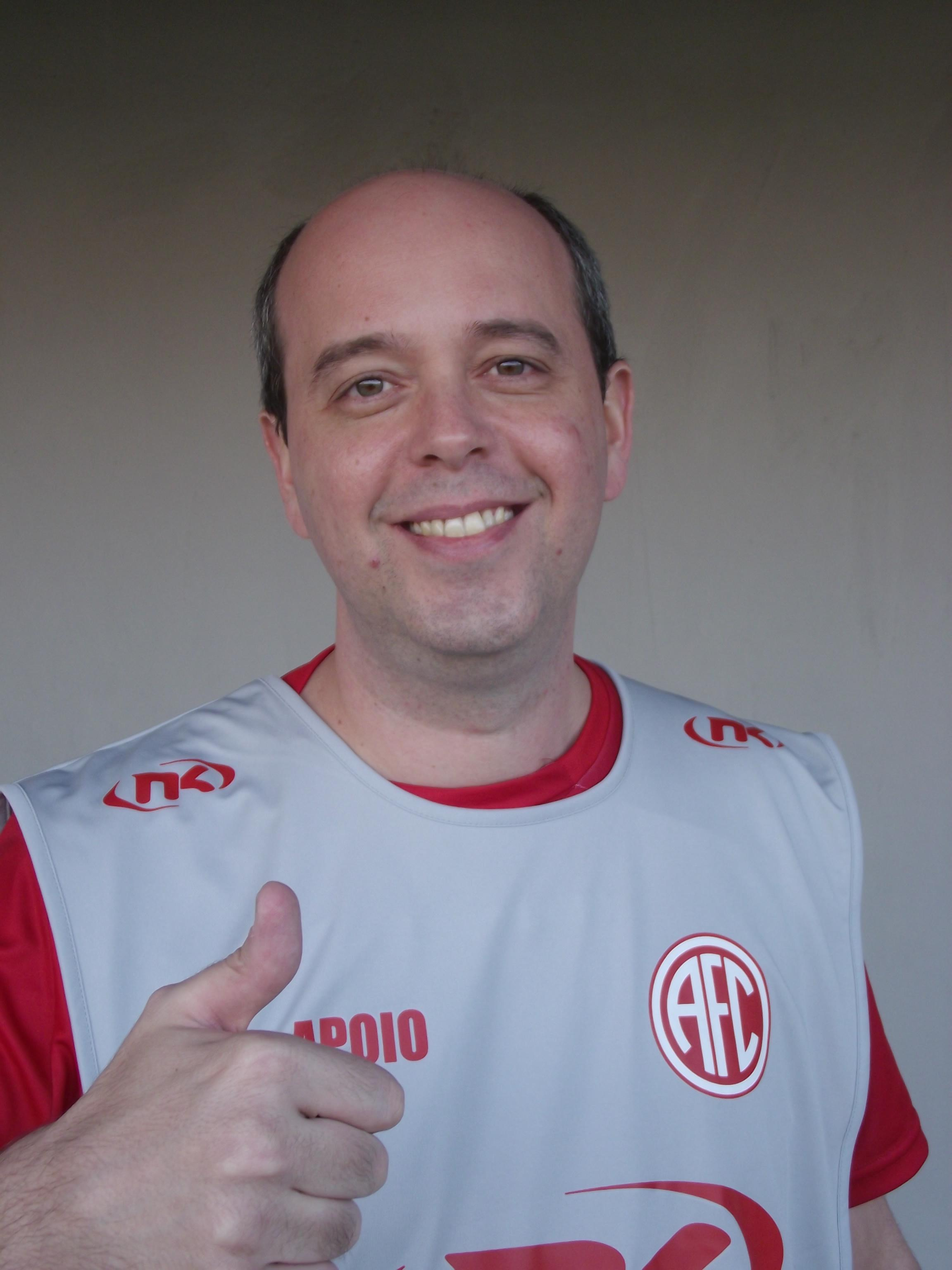
- Born: Alex Escobar da Silva; October 15, 1974 (age 51); Rio de Janeiro, Brazil
- Occupations: Journalist and Presenter
- Spouse: Thamine Leta

Alex Escobar da Silva from Alex Escobar (15 October 1974 in Rio de Janeiro) is a Brazilian journalist and presenter.

His career in radio as a speaker. where was first presenter of radio program Rock Bola, of the defunct Radio Cidade. after this acted on How sad, as commentator and participating in programs of the broadcaster.

Since 2008, it operates in Globo Network initially as a presenter of the framework of sports of Bom Dia Rio and Brasil. and then the editing carioca in Globo Esporte, where he was in the period of 2011 to 2015, coinciding with the function of speaker sports.

Still acts as narrator of the parades of the Serie A carnival in Rio and since 2015, and the presenter of the Esporte Espetacular. after a year and two months, Escobar left to return the editing carioca in Globo Esporte.

In 2017, Alex Escobar will cease the transmission of Série A and is forward the parade of Grupo Especial. in October 2021, he was announced as the new presenter of Fantástico sports block. replacing Tadeu Schmidt, who went to Big Brother Brasil and debuted on 21 November.
