= Ivaldo Bertazzo =

Brazilian dancer, choreographer and movement therapist

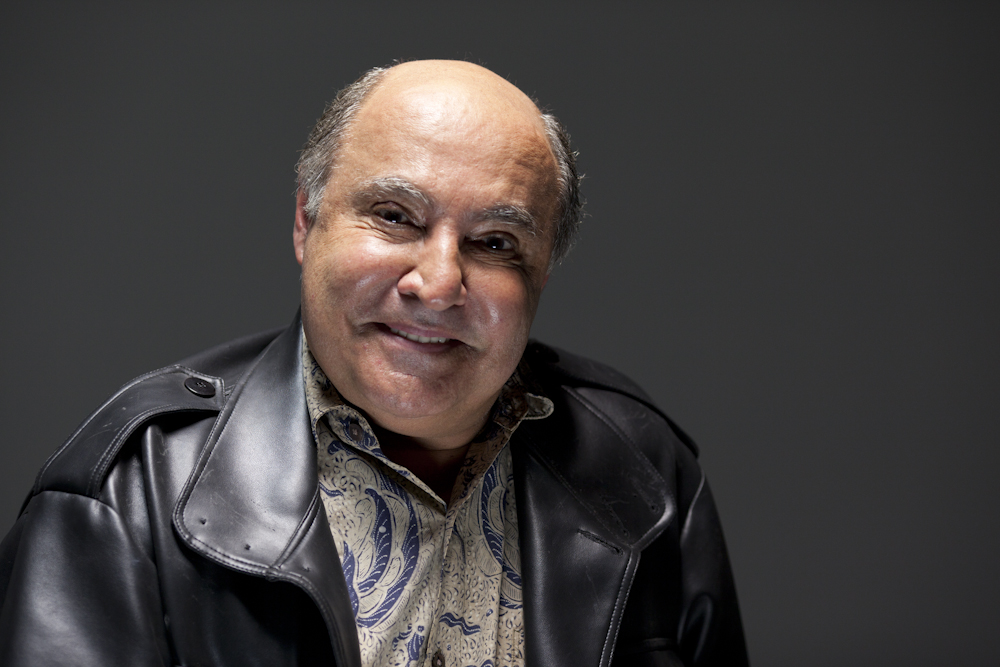
- Website: http://ivaldobertazzo.com

Ivaldo Bertazzo is a Brazilian dancer, choreographer and movement therapist.

Bertazzo was born in São Paulo in 1949, as a son of an Italian father and Lebanese mother. He began his professional career as a dancer when he was sixteen years old. He performed in Latin America as well as in other parts of the world, like in Europe, Africa and Asia.

Since 1975 he continued his career as a youth worker, dancing teacher and choreographer. This particular year he founded the Escola de Movimento (Movement School) in São Paulo. Here he develops new training schemes for youngsters from the favelas and other underprivileged backgrounds. He offers them perspectives by giving dancing and movement classes and cultural education. Furthermore they have lessons in origami - to train spatial insight -, singing, percussion, history of dance, communication, speech-language pathology and health care.

In his choreographies he combines varying dancing styles, from hip hop, capoeira until even Indian dance. With his pupils he makes worldwide appearances.

In 2004, Bertazzo was honored with a Prince Claus Award from the Netherlands for "establishing these innovative programmes that put young people in touch with their potential, and for stimulating cultural creativity that provides opportunities for individuals and communities."
